= List of accolades received by Dabangg =

Awards and nominations
Award	Won	Nominated
National Film Awards	1	1
BIG Star Entertainment Awards	5	7
Lions Gold Awards	6	6
Zee Cine Awards	9	20
Filmfare Awards	6	9
Stardust Awards	6	12
Apsara Film & Television Producers Guild Awards	8	11
Mirchi Music Awards	8	12
IIFA Awards	10	15
Global Indian Music Awards	7	13
FICCI Frames Excellence Honours Awards	3	3
Aaj Tak Awards	5	5
Rajiv Gandhi Achievers Award	2	2
AXN Action Award	5	5
ETC Bollywood Business Awards	3	3
BIG Star IMA Awards	3	6
Tally
Totals	109	169
Footnotes

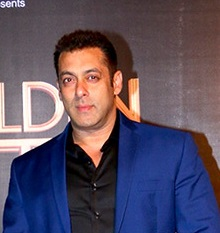
Salman Khan received several awards and nominations for this film

Dabangg (transl. Fearless) is a 2010 Indian Hindi-language action comedy film directed by Abhinav Singh Kashyap (in his directorial debut) and produced by Arbaaz Khan (in his debut as a film producer) and Malaika Arora Khan under Arbaaz Khan Productions, with Dhilin Mehta serving as the co-producer and distributor of the film under Shree Ashtavinayak Cine Vision banner. Khan's elder brother Salman Khan starred in the lead role, with Sonakshi Sinha (in her acting debut) as the female lead, Sonu Sood playing the antagonist and himself featuring in a supporting role. Other actors who feature in supporting roles are Om Puri, Dimple Kapadia, Vinod Khanna, Anupam Kher, Mahesh Manjrekar and Mahie Gill. Besides producing the film, Malaika also appears in the item number "Munni Badnaam Hui". Set in the Indian state of Uttar Pradesh, Dabangg tells the story of a fearless police officer, Chulbul Pandey (Khan) and his troubled relationship with his stepfather and half-brother.

Made on a budget of ₹49 crore (equivalent to ₹110 crore or US$11 million in 2023), including the production and marketing costs, Dabangg released in over 2300 theatres worldwide on 10 September 2010, coinciding with the Eid al-Fitr and Ganesh Chaturthi festivals and opened to generally positive reviews from critics, praising the performances (especially those of Khan and Sood), action sequences, music and humour, but criticised its script and screenplay. Grossing over ₹219 crore (equivalent to ₹491 crore or US$51 million in 2023), it became the highest-grossing Bollywood film of 2010.

Dabangg received accolades in major film award functions in India. Among them, it won the National Film Award for Best Popular Film Providing Wholesome Entertainment. It was given six awards at the 56th Filmfare Awards, including one for Best Film, seven Screen Awards, nine Zee Cine Awards, and ten IIFA Awards. As of 2012, the film has won 111 awards out of 172 nominations.

== Awards and nominations ==
Award	Date of ceremony (Note: Date is linked to the article about the awards held that year, wherever possible.)	Category	Recipients	Result	Ref.
BIG Star Entertainment Awards	21 December 2010	Most Entertaining Film	Malaika Arora, Arbaaz Khan, Dhillin Mehta	Won	
BIG Star Entertainment Awards	21 December 2010	Most Entertaining Director	Abhinav Kashyap	Won	
BIG Star Entertainment Awards	21 December 2010	Most Entertaining Film Actor – Male	Salman Khan	Won	
BIG Star Entertainment Awards	21 December 2010	Most Entertaining Song	"Munni Badnaam Hui"	Won	
BIG Star Entertainment Awards	21 December 2010	Most Entertaining Singer – Male	Rahat Fateh Ali Khan for "Tere Mast Mast Do Nain"	Won	
BIG Star Entertainment Awards	21 December 2010	Most Entertaining Singer – Female	Mamta Sharma for "Munni Badnaam Hui"	Nominated	
BIG Star Entertainment Awards	21 December 2010	Most Entertaining Music	Sajid–Wajid	Nominated	
National Film Awards	9 September 2011	Best Popular Film Providing Wholesome Entertainment	Malaika Arora, Arbaaz Khan, Dhillin Mehta	Won	
Screen Awards	6 January 2011	Best Actor	Salman Khan	Won	
Screen Awards	6 January 2011	Best Actor in a Negative Role	Sonu Sood	Nominated	
Screen Awards	6 January 2011	Best Music Director	Sajid–Wajid	Won	
Screen Awards	6 January 2011	Best Female Playback	Mamta Sharma for "Munni Badnaam Hui"	Won	
Screen Awards	6 January 2011	Best Dialogue	Abhinav Kashyap	Nominated	
Screen Awards	6 January 2011	Best Screenplay	Abhinav Kashyap	Nominated	
Screen Awards	6 January 2011	Best Editing	Pranav Dhiwar	Nominated	
Screen Awards	6 January 2011	Best Choreography	Farah Khan for "Munni Badnaam Hui"	Won	
Screen Awards	6 January 2011	Best Female Debut	Sonakshi Sinha	Won	
Screen Awards	6 January 2011	Most Promising Debut Director	Abhinav Kashyap	Nominated	
Screen Awards	6 January 2011	Best New Talent In Music	Mamta Sharma for "Munni Badnaam Hui"	Won	
Screen Awards	6 January 2011	Best Action	Vijayan Master	Won	
Screen Awards	6 January 2011	Best Special Effects	Azaga Sawmi	Nominated	
Zee Cine Awards	14 January 2011	Best Film	Dabangg	Won	
Zee Cine Awards	14 January 2011	Most Promising Debut Director	Abhinav Kashyap	Won	
Zee Cine Awards	14 January 2011	Most Promising Debut (Female)	Sonakshi Sinha	Won	
Zee Cine Awards	14 January 2011	Zee Cine Award for Best Music	Sajid–Wajid	Won	
Zee Cine Awards	14 January 2011	Best Screenplay	Abhinav Kashyap and Dilip Shukla	Won	
Zee Cine Awards	14 January 2011	Best Background Music	Sandeep Shirodkar	Won	
Zee Cine Awards	14 January 2011	Best Action	Vijayan Master	Won	
Zee Cine Awards	14 January 2011	Best Editing	Pranav V Dhiwar	Won	
Zee Cine Awards	14 January 2011	Sa Re Ga Ma Pa - Song of the Year	"Munni Badnaam Hui"	Won	
Zee Cine Awards	14 January 2011	Best Director	Abhinav Kashyap	Nominated	
Zee Cine Awards	14 January 2011	Best Actor	Salman Khan	Nominated	
Zee Cine Awards	14 January 2011	Best Cinematography	Mahesh Limaye	Nominated	
Zee Cine Awards	14 January 2011	Best Story	Abhinav Kashyap and Dilip Shukla	Nominated	
Zee Cine Awards	14 January 2011	Best Villain	Sonu Sood	Nominated	
Zee Cine Awards	14 January 2011	Best Supporting Actor	Arbaaz Khan	Nominated	
Zee Cine Awards	14 January 2011	Best Supporting Actress	Dimple Kapadia	Nominated	
Zee Cine Awards	14 January 2011	Best Lyricist	Faiz Anwar for "Tere Mast Mast Do Nain"	Nominated	
Zee Cine Awards	14 January 2011	Best Female Playback Singer	Shreya Ghoshal for "Chori Kiya Re Jiya	Nominated	
Zee Cine Awards	14 January 2011	Best Female Playback Singer	Mamta Sharma for "Munni Badnaam Hui"	Nominated	
Zee Cine Awards	14 January 2011	Best Male Playback Singer	Rahat Fateh Ali Khan for "Tere Mast Mast Do Nain"	Nominated	
Filmfare Awards	29 January 2011	Best Film	Dabangg	Won	
Filmfare Awards	29 January 2011	Best Female Debut	Sonakshi Sinha	Won	
Filmfare Awards	29 January 2011	Best Music Director	Sajid–Wajid	Won	
Filmfare Awards	29 January 2011	Best Song Composer	Lalit Pandit for "Munni Badnaam Hui"	Won	
Filmfare Awards	29 January 2011	Best Female Playback Singer	Mamta Sharma for "Munni Badnaam Hui"	Won	
Filmfare Awards	29 January 2011	Best Action	Vijayan Master	Won	
Filmfare Awards	29 January 2011	Best Director	Abhinav Kashyap	Nominated	
Filmfare Awards	29 January 2011	Best Actor	Salman Khan	Nominated	
Filmfare Awards	29 January 2011	Best Lyricist	Faiz Anwar for "Tere Mast Mast Do Nain"	Nominated	
Apsara Film & Television Producers Guild Awards	12 January 2011	Best Actor	Salman Khan	Won	
Apsara Film & Television Producers Guild Awards	12 January 2011	Best Film	Arbaaz Khan Productions	Won	
Apsara Film & Television Producers Guild Awards	12 January 2011	Best Female Debut	Sonakshi Sinha	Won	
Apsara Film & Television Producers Guild Awards	12 January 2011	Best Villain	Sonu Sood	Won	
Apsara Film & Television Producers Guild Awards	12 January 2011	Best Male Playback Singer	Rahat Fateh Ali Khan for "Tere Mast Mast Do Nain"	Won	
Apsara Film & Television Producers Guild Awards	12 January 2011	Best Female Playback Singer	Mamta Sharma for "Munni Badnaam Hui"	Won	
Apsara Film & Television Producers Guild Awards	12 January 2011	Best Music Director	Sajid–Wajid	Won	
Apsara Film & Television Producers Guild Awards	12 January 2011	Best Dialogue	Abhinav Kashyap and Dilip Shukla	Won	
Apsara Film & Television Producers Guild Awards	12 January 2011	Best Lyricist	Faiz Anwar for "Tere Mast Mat Do Nain"	Nominated	
Apsara Film & Television Producers Guild Awards	12 January 2011	Best Choreography	Farah Khan for "Munni Badnaam Hui"	Nominated	
Apsara Film & Television Producers Guild Awards	12 January 2011	Best Special Effects	Alagar Swamy	Nominated	
Stardust Awards	6 February 2011	Superstar of Tomorrow - Female	Sonakshi Sinha	Won	
Stardust Awards	6 February 2011	Hottest New Director	Abhinav Kashyap	Won	
Stardust Awards	6 February 2011	Hottest Film of the Year	Arbaaz Khan	Won	
Stardust Awards	6 February 2011	Best Director - Thriller and Action	Abhinav Kashyap	Won	
Stardust Awards	6 February 2011	Star of the Year - Male	Salman Khan	Won	
Stardust Awards	6 February 2011	Best Film of the Year	Dabangg	Won	
Stardust Awards	6 February 2011	New Musical Sensation - Female	Mamta Sharma for "Munni Badnaam Hui"	Nominated	
Stardust Awards	6 February 2011	Best Film - Thriller and Action	Dabangg	Nominated	
Stardust Awards	6 February 2011	Best Actor - Thriller or Action	Salman Khan	Nominated	
Stardust Awards	6 February 2011	Best Actress - Thriller or Action	Sonakshi Sinha	Nominated	
Stardust Awards	6 February 2011	Best Actor in an Ensemble Cast	Sonu Sood	Nominated	
Stardust Awards	6 February 2011	Best Actress in an Ensemble Cast	Dimple Kapadia	Nominated	
International Indian Film Academy Awards	23–25 June 2011	Best Film	Arbaaz Khan Productions	Won	
International Indian Film Academy Awards	23–25 June 2011	Best Debut - Female	Sonakshi Sinha	Won	
International Indian Film Academy Awards	23–25 June 2011	Best Villain	Sonu Sood	Won	
International Indian Film Academy Awards	23–25 June 2011	Best Music Director	Sajid–Wajid and Lalit Pandit	Won	
International Indian Film Academy Awards	23–25 June 2011	Best Male Playback Singer	Rahat Fateh Ali Khan for "Tere Mast Mast Do Nain"	Won	
International Indian Film Academy Awards	23–25 June 2011	Best Female Playback Singer	Mamta Sharma for "Munni Badnaam Hui"	Won	
International Indian Film Academy Awards	23–25 June 2011	Best Screenplay	Abhinav Kashyap and Dilip Shukla	Won	
International Indian Film Academy Awards	23–25 June 2011	Best Choreography	Farah Khan for "Munni Badnaam Hui"	Won	
International Indian Film Academy Awards	23–25 June 2011	Best Action	Vijayan Master	Won	
International Indian Film Academy Awards	23–25 June 2011	Best Sound Re-Recording	Leslie Fernades	Won	
International Indian Film Academy Awards	23–25 June 2011	Best Director	Abhinav Kashyap	Nominated	
International Indian Film Academy Awards	23–25 June 2011	Best Actor	Salman Khan	Nominated	
International Indian Film Academy Awards	23–25 June 2011	Best Supporting Actress	Dimple Kapadia	Nominated	
International Indian Film Academy Awards	23–25 June 2011	Best Lyricist	Faiz Anwar for "Tere Mast Mast Do Nain"	Nominated	
International Indian Film Academy Awards	23–25 June 2011	Best Dialogue	Abhinav Kashyap and Dilip Shukla	Nominated	
Mirchi Music Awards	27 January 2011	Best Album of the Year	Dabangg	Won	
Mirchi Music Awards	27 January 2011	Best Male Vocalist	Rahat Fateh Ali Khan for "Tere Mast Mast Do Nain"	Won	
Mirchi Music Awards	27 January 2011	Best Female Vocalist	Aishwarya Nigam and Mamta Sharma for "Munni Badnaam Hui"	Won	
Mirchi Music Awards	27 January 2011	Best Background Score	Sandeep Shirodkar	Won	
Mirchi Music Awards	27 January 2011	Best Upcoming Singer of the Year - Female	Mamta Sharma for "Munni Badnaam Hui"	Won	
Mirchi Music Awards	27 January 2011	Best Item Number	"Munni Badnaam Hui"	Won	
Mirchi Music Awards	27 January 2011	Best Song of the Year	"Munni Badnaam Hui"	Won	
Mirchi Music Awards	27 January 2011	Best Music Director of the Year	Sajid–Wajid for "Tere Mast Mast Do Nain"	Won	
Mirchi Music Awards	27 January 2011	Best Song of the Year	"Tere Mast Mast Do Nain"	Nominated	
Mirchi Music Awards	27 January 2011	Best Female Vocalist of the Year	Shreya Ghoshal for "Chori Kiya Ra Jiya"	Nominated	
Mirchi Music Awards	27 January 2011	Best Music Director of the Year	Lalit Pandit for "Munni Badnaam Hui"	Nominated	
Mirchi Music Awards	27 January 2011	Best Lyricist of the Year	Faiz Anwar for "Tere Mast Mast Do Nain"	Nominated	
Mirchi Music Awards	27 January 2011	Best Song Recording	Abani Tanti for "Munni Badnaam Hui"	Nominated	
Raj Khosla Foundation Directors Awards	8 January 2011	Best Newcomer Director	Abhinav Kashyap	Won	
Journalist National Awards	22 November 2010	Best Female Debut Singer	Mamta Sharma for "Munni Badnaam Hui"	Won	
Kalakar Awards	4 November 2010	Best Female Debut Singer	Mamta Sharma for "Munni Badnaam Hui"	Won	
Golden Kela Awards	25 March 2011	The Ajooba Award - Sheer Awesomeness	Dabangg	Won	
NDTV Poll	1 January 2011	Best Song of the Year	"Munni Badnaam Hui"	Won	
Airtel Poll	1 January 2011	Super Star Unique Andaz - Male	Salman Khan for Dabangg	Won	
Global Indian Music Academy Awards	30 October 2011	Best Film Album	Dabangg	Won	
Global Indian Music Academy Awards	30 October 2011	Best Music Director	Sajid–Wajid and Lalit Pandit	Won	
Global Indian Music Academy Awards	30 October 2011	Best Music Debut - Female	Mamta Sharma for "Munni Badnaam Hui"	Won	
Global Indian Music Academy Awards	30 October 2011	Best Engineer - Film Album	Eric Pillai	Won	
Global Indian Music Academy Awards	30 October 2011	Best Engineer - Theatre Mix	Leslie Fernades	Won	
Global Indian Music Academy Awards	30 October 2011	Best Background Score	Sandeep Shirodkar	Won	
Global Indian Music Academy Awards	30 October 2011	Red FM Most Popular Song on Radio	"Tere Mast Mast Do Nain"	Won	
Global Indian Music Academy Awards	30 October 2011	Best Music Arranger and Programmer	Sandeep Shirodkar for "Tere Mast Mast Do Nain"	Nominated	
Global Indian Music Academy Awards	30 October 2011	Best Lyricist	Faiz Anwar for "Tere Mast Mast Do Nain"	Nominated	
Global Indian Music Academy Awards	30 October 2011	Best Female Playback Singer	Mamta Sharma for "Munni Badnaam Hui"	Nominated	
Global Indian Music Academy Awards	30 October 2011	Best Male Playback Singer	Rahat Fateh Ali Khan for "Tere Mast Mast Do Nain"	Nominated	
Global Indian Music Academy Awards	30 October 2011	Best Song	"Munni Badnaam Hui"	Nominated	
Global Indian Music Academy Awards	30 October 2011	Best Song	"Tere Mast Mast Do Nain"	Nominated	
BIG STAR IMA Awards	25 February 2011	Best Music Composer	Sajid–Wajid for "Tere Mast Mast Do Nain"	Won	
BIG STAR IMA Awards	25 February 2011	Best Album of the Year	Dabangg	Won	
BIG STAR IMA Awards	25 February 2011	Best Dance Song of the Year	"Munni Badnaam Hui"	Won	
BIG STAR IMA Awards	25 February 2011	Best Female Playback Singer	Mamta Sharma for "Munni Badnaam Hui"	Nominated	
BIG STAR IMA Awards	25 February 2011	Best Music Composer	Lalit Pandit for "Munni Badnaam Hui"	Nominated	
BIG STAR IMA Awards	25 February 2011	Best Background Score	Sandeep Shirodkar	Nominated	
Lions Gold Awards	11 January 2011	Favourite Film	Dabangg	Won	
Lions Gold Awards	11 January 2011	Favourite Sensational Singer	Mamta Sharma for "Munni Badnaam Hui"	Won	
Lions Gold Awards	11 January 2011	Favourite Debut Director	Abhinav Kashyap	Won	
Lions Gold Awards	11 January 2011	Favourite Music Director	Sajid–Wajid	Won	
Lions Gold Awards	11 January 2011	Favourite Actress	Sonakshi Sinha	Won	
Lions Gold Awards	11 January 2011	Favourite Choreographer	Farah Khan for "Munni Badnaam Hui"	Won	
FICCI Frames Excellence Honours Awards	26 March 2011	Best Film	Dabangg	Won	
FICCI Frames Excellence Honours Awards	26 March 2011	Best Music Director	Sajid–Wajid	Won	
FICCI Frames Excellence Honours Awards	26 March 2011	Best Female Debut	Sonakshi Sinha	Won	
Aaj Tak Awards	3 January 2012	Best Film	Dabangg	Won	
Aaj Tak Awards	3 January 2012	Best Actor	Salman Khan	Won	
Aaj Tak Awards	3 January 2012	Best Female Debut	Sonakshi Sinha	Won	
Aaj Tak Awards	3 January 2012	Best Director	Abhinav Kashyap	Won	
Aaj Tak Awards	3 January 2012	Best Song	"Munni Badnaam Hui"	Won	
Rajiv Gandhi Achievers Awards	15 December 2010	Best Debut Producer	Arbaaz Khan	Won	
Rajiv Gandhi Achievers Awards	15 December 2010	Best Bollywood Remix	Romeo and DJ Deepesh for "Tere Mast Mast Do Nain"	Won	
AXN Action Awards	3 May 2011	Best Film	Dabangg	Won	
AXN Action Awards	3 May 2011	Best Actor	Salman Khan	Won	
AXN Action Awards	3 May 2011	Best Director	Abhinav Kashyap	Won	
AXN Action Awards	3 May 2011	Best Villain	Sonu Sood	Won	
AXN Action Awards	3 May 2011	Best Sequence	Dabangg	Won	
ETC Bollywood Business Awards	28 December 2010	Top Grosser of the Year	Dabangg	Won	
ETC Bollywood Business Awards	28 December 2010	Most Successful Producer	Arbaaz Khan	Won	
ETC Bollywood Business Awards	28 December 2010	Most Profitable Director	Abhinav Kashyap	Won	
