= Dabangg (soundtrack) =

2010 soundtrack album to Dabangg by Sajid–Wajid and Lalit Pandit

Soundtrack album to Dabangg by Sajid–Wajid and Lalit Pandit
- Released: 20 August 2010
- Genre: Feature film soundtrack
- Length: 47:39
- Language: Hindi
- Label: T-Series
- Producers: Sajid–Wajid; Lalit Pandit

Sajid–Wajid chronology
Jaane Kahan Se Aayi Hai (2010)	Dabangg (2010)	No Problem (2010)

Lalit Pandit chronology
Horn 'Ok' Pleassss (2025)	Dabangg (2010)	Dulha Mil Gaya (2010)

Dabangg (transl. Fearless) is the soundtrack to the 2010 film of the same name. Directed by Abhinav Singh Kashyap (in his directorial debut), the film is produced by Arbaaz Khan (in his debut as a film producer) and Malaika Arora Khan under Arbaaz Khan Productions, with Dhilin Mehta serving as the co-producer and distributor of the film under Shree Ashtavinayak Cine Vision banner. Khan's elder brother Salman Khan starred in the lead role.

The soundtrack album featured five original songs, four remix versions, an alternate version of the track and a theme song, totalling up to 10 tracks in the album. The item number "Munni Badnaam Hui" is written and composed by Lalit Pandit, while the music director duo Sajid–Wajid (Khan's norm collaborator) composed the remainder of it, and Faiz Anwar and Jalees Sherwani writing lyrics for those tracks. The background score is composed by Sandeep Shirodkar. The film's music album was launched on 20 August 2010 through digital formats, even before few of the tracks were aired in radio stations. The same day, a physical launch was conducted in Delhi, with the presence of the cast and crew. T-Series, which purchased the marketing rights of the film's music album for ₹90 million (equivalent to ₹220 million or US$2.3 million in 2026), (Note: The average exchange rate in 2010 was 45.09 Indian rupees (₹) per 1 US dollar (US$).) released the physical copies of the album into the stores.

The album opened to positive response from critics and audiences. Commercially, the tracks set records in sales of physical CDs and through digital downloads; songs including "Tere Mast Mast Do Nain" and "Munni Badnaam Hui" opened exceptionally from listeners and became chartbusters, topping the music, radio and streaming charts. Singer Mamta Sharma who crooned the latter, gained immense popularity after the track's success. In addition, the album won three awards each at Filmfare (including one for Best Music Director), Zee Cine, Producers Guild, Lions Gold, BIG STAR IMA, two BIG Star Entertainment, five IIFA and seven awards each at Mirchi Music at GiMA Awards.

Sajid–Wajid renewed his association as composer in Dabangg 2 (2012) and Dabangg 3 (2019), the future instalments of the Dabangg franchise. The track "Munni Badnaam Hui" was recreated as "Munna Badnam Hua" for the latter, and the titular track "Hud Hud Dabangg" was re-created twice as "Dabangg Reloaded" in the former, and "Hud Hud" (the same name as the original) in the latter. However, music enthusiasts gave mixed opinions for the soundtrack albums of both the films, due to its quality being deteriorated due to their comparisons with that of the original.

== Composition ==
Like their previous films of Khan, the tracks in Dabangg were composed in mind with the on-screen and off-screen persona of the star, implying that it would resonate with the star's fanbase. In an interview with Devansh Patel of Bollywood Hungama, the duo stated that "Dabangg is a very rural subject in terms of its music. We were confident that we would do something as wacky as the script." About composing the track "Tere Mast Mast Do Nain", Wajid had stated that "This song was already made when the film came to us. Before I could finish singing one line to Salman bhai, he said, 'kamaal track hai (great song), this is a super hit song!' He takes such an active interest that the music making process becomes far more enjoyable. It also makes things easy because if he likes the song, it is finalised for the film." The duo worked on the programming and arrangements of the film's background score, while Sandeep Shirodkar worked on the composition.

The title track "Hud Hud Dabangg" was composed even before the duo heard the full script and had composed in front of the producers and director, which they appreciated. Wajid said that "the song was made on just a mere character sketch of Salman, but was improved with Kashyap's vision". The track "Munni Badnaam Hui" is said to be inspired by an old Bhojpuri folk song "Launda Badnaam Hua Naseeban Tere Liye". Director Abhinav Kashyap accepted using the folk song saying that he, being from Uttar Pradesh, was familiar with the song since childhood so he suggested the very song to be improvised and rephrased to fit the film's requirement. It has been stated that particular composition and lyrics (i.e. the rephrasing) were copied from the Pakistani song "Ladka Badnaam Hua" from the film Mr. Charlie (1992) performed by Umer Shareef.

== Critical reception ==
Dabangg's soundtrack received generally positive reviews from music critics. Joginder Tuteja of Bollywood Hungama gave the album 3 stars and said, "[it] delivers what it promised. One expected a masala soundtrack and this is what one gets with a couple of item song sequences, a couple of theme tracks and two love songs which are actually the highlight of the film. A soundtrack that has something in store for mass as well as class." Atta Khan of Planet Bollywood gave it a rating of 6 out of 10, and called the soundtrack "simple, catchy, easy on the ears and fun" and further wrote "Dabangg further showcases their ability to connect with the mass audience. In other words it delivers thanks to their knowledge of 'what is required' and their ability to attract strong singers such as Sonu Nigam, Sukhwinder Singh and Shreya Ghoshal."

In a 3-star rating, critic Devesh Sharma of Filmfare praised Sajid–Wajid's composition, saying "the soundtrack scores high on energy quotient". He picked the track "Chori Kiya Re Jiya" as the best from the album, calling it "[pleasure] to the ears". Ruchika Kher of Hindustan Times gave 3 stars saying that the album "has mass appeal, entertaining and apt for the film". Giving 7.5 stars out of 10, Vipin Nair of Music Aloud called it as the "customary Salman Khan soundtrack", but added "Sajid-Wajid and Lalit Pandit manage to make it more enjoyable than the previous ones in that line". Milliblog's Karthik Srinivasan stated "Two listenable tracks is a lot for this soundtrack". Komal Nahta called the film's music as "one of the highlights" and said "Every song is a wonderfully composed number so that the three music directors emerge as three additional heroes of the film".

== Charts and sales ==
The album performed well on the charts after its release. The tracks "Tere Mast Mast Do Nain" and "Munni Badnaam" were successful, and entered the list of top 20 most frequently played songs on radio in India. In August 2010, the track "Tere Mast Mast Do Nain" reached number-one on the Official Asian Download Chart in the United Kingdom based on legal downloads in that country. The audio CDs of Dabangg's soundtrack priced at ₹175 (US$1.80), reportedly shown a varied interest among the audience with a record of 5 lakh CDs were sold before the film's release. Dabangg, as well as the physical soundtrack of 3 Idiots (2009) set records in music CD sales, before the decline of CDs and physical formats, which attributed due to the advent of digital downloads and music streaming platforms. Additionally, the audio of Dabangg saw more than million digital downloads.

== Awards and nominations ==
Award	Date of ceremony (Note: Date is linked to the article about the awards held that year, wherever possible.)	Category	Recipients	Result	Ref.
BIG Star Entertainment Awards	21 December 2010	Most Entertaining Song	"Munni Badnaam Hui"	Won	
BIG Star Entertainment Awards	21 December 2010	Most Entertaining Singer – Male	Rahat Fateh Ali Khan for "Tere Mast Mast Do Nain"	Won	
BIG Star Entertainment Awards	21 December 2010	Most Entertaining Singer – Female	Mamta Sharma for "Munni Badnaam Hui"	Nominated	
BIG Star Entertainment Awards	21 December 2010	Most Entertaining Music	Sajid–Wajid	Nominated	
Screen Awards	6 January 2011	Best Music Director	Sajid–Wajid	Won	
Screen Awards	6 January 2011	Best Female Playback Singer	Mamta Sharma for "Munni Badnaam Hui"	Won	
Screen Awards	6 January 2011	Best Choreography	Farah Khan for "Munni Badnaam Hui"	Won	
Screen Awards	6 January 2011	Best New Talent In Music	Mamta Sharma for "Munni Badnaam Hui"	Won	
Zee Cine Awards	14 January 2011	Best Music Director	Sajid–Wajid	Won	
Zee Cine Awards	14 January 2011	Best Background Music	Sandeep Shirodkar	Won	
Zee Cine Awards	14 January 2011	Sa Re Ga Ma Pa – Song of the Year	"Munni Badnaam Hui"	Won	
Zee Cine Awards	14 January 2011	Best Lyricist	Faiz Anwar for "Tere Mast Mast Do Nain"	Nominated	
Zee Cine Awards	14 January 2011	Best Female Playback Singer	Shreya Ghoshal for "Chori Kiya Re Jiya	Nominated	
Zee Cine Awards	14 January 2011	Best Female Playback Singer	Mamta Sharma for "Munni Badnaam Hui"	Nominated	
Zee Cine Awards	14 January 2011	Best Male Playback Singer	Rahat Fateh Ali Khan for "Tere Mast Mast Do Nain"	Nominated	
Filmfare Awards	29 January 2011	Best Music Director	Sajid–Wajid	Won	
Filmfare Awards	29 January 2011	Best Music Director	Lalit Pandit for "Munni Badnaam Hui"	Won	
Filmfare Awards	29 January 2011	Best Female Playback Singer	Mamta Sharma for "Munni Badnaam Hui"	Won	
Filmfare Awards	29 January 2011	Best Lyricist	Faiz Anwar for "Tere Mast Mast Do Nain"	Nominated	
Apsara Film & Television Producers Guild Awards	12 January 2011	Best Male Playback Singer	Rahat Fateh Ali Khan for "Tere Mast Mast Do Nain"	Won	
Apsara Film & Television Producers Guild Awards	12 January 2011	Best Female Playback Singer	Mamta Sharma for "Munni Badnaam Hui"	Won	
Apsara Film & Television Producers Guild Awards	12 January 2011	Best Music Director	Sajid–Wajid	Won	
Apsara Film & Television Producers Guild Awards	12 January 2011	Best Lyricist	Faiz Anwar for "Tere Mast Mat Do Nain"	Nominated	
Apsara Film & Television Producers Guild Awards	12 January 2011	Best Choreography	Farah Khan for "Munni Badnaam Hui"	Nominated	
Stardust Awards	6 February 2011	New Musical Sensation – Female	Mamta Sharma for "Munni Badnaam Hui"	Nominated	
International Indian Film Academy Awards	23–25 June 2011	Best Music Director	Sajid–Wajid and Lalit Pandit	Won	
International Indian Film Academy Awards	23–25 June 2011	Best Male Playback Singer	Rahat Fateh Ali Khan for "Tere Mast Mast Do Nain"	Won	
International Indian Film Academy Awards	23–25 June 2011	Best Female Playback Singer	Mamta Sharma for "Munni Badnaam Hui"	Won	
International Indian Film Academy Awards	23–25 June 2011	Best Choreography	Farah Khan for "Munni Badnaam Hui"	Won	
International Indian Film Academy Awards	23–25 June 2011	Best Sound Re-Recording	Leslie Fernades	Won	
International Indian Film Academy Awards	23–25 June 2011	Best Lyricist	Faiz Anwar for "Tere Mast Mast Do Nain"	Nominated	
Mirchi Music Awards	27 January 2011	Best Album of the Year	Dabangg	Won	
Mirchi Music Awards	27 January 2011	Best Male Vocalist	Rahat Fateh Ali Khan for "Tere Mast Mast Do Nain"	Won	
Mirchi Music Awards	27 January 2011	Best Female Vocalist	Aishwarya Nigam and Mamta Sharma for "Munni Badnaam Hui"	Won	
Mirchi Music Awards	27 January 2011	Best Background Score	Sandeep Shirodkar	Won	
Mirchi Music Awards	27 January 2011	Best Upcoming Singer of the Year – Female	Mamta Sharma for "Munni Badnaam Hui"	Won	
Mirchi Music Awards	27 January 2011	Best Music Director of the Year	Sajid–Wajid for "Tere Mast Mast Do Nain"	Won	
Mirchi Music Awards	27 January 2011	Best Item Number	"Munni Badnaam Hui"	Won	
Mirchi Music Awards	27 January 2011	Best Song of the Year	"Munni Badnaam Hui"	Nominated	
Mirchi Music Awards	27 January 2011	Best Song of the Year	"Tere Mast Mast Do Nain"	Nominated	
Mirchi Music Awards	27 January 2011	Best Female Vocalist of the Year	Shreya Ghoshal for "Chori Kiya Ra Jiya"	Nominated	
Mirchi Music Awards	27 January 2011	Best Music Director of the Year	Lalit Pandit for "Munni Badnaam Hui"	Nominated	
Mirchi Music Awards	27 January 2011	Best Lyricist of the Year	Faiz Anwar for "Tere Mast Mast Do Nain"	Nominated	
Mirchi Music Awards	27 January 2011	Best Song Recording	Abani Tanti for "Munni Badnaam Hui"	Nominated	
Journalist National Awards	22 November 2010	Best Female Debut Singer	Mamta Sharma for "Munni Badnaam Hui"	Won	
Kalakar Awards	4 November 2010	Best Female Debut Singer	Mamta Sharma for "Munni Badnaam Hui"	Won	
NDTV Poll	1 January 2011	Best Song of the Year	"Munni Badnaam Hui"	Won	
Global Indian Music Academy Awards	30 October 2011	Best Film Album	Dabangg	Won	
Global Indian Music Academy Awards	30 October 2011	Best Music Director	Sajid–Wajid and Lalit Pandit	Won	
Global Indian Music Academy Awards	30 October 2011	Best Music Debut - Female	Mamta Sharma for "Munni Badnaam Hui"	Won	
Global Indian Music Academy Awards	30 October 2011	Best Engineer - Film Album	Eric Pillai	Won	
Global Indian Music Academy Awards	30 October 2011	Best Engineer - Theatre Mix	Leslie Fernades	Won	
Global Indian Music Academy Awards	30 October 2011	Best Background Score	Sandeep Shirodkar	Won	
Global Indian Music Academy Awards	30 October 2011	Red FM Most Popular Song on Radio	"Tere Mast Mast Do Nain"	Won	
Global Indian Music Academy Awards	30 October 2011	Best Music Arranger and Programmer	Sandeep Shirodkar for "Tere Mast Mast Do Nain"	Nominated	
Global Indian Music Academy Awards	30 October 2011	Best Lyricist	Faiz Anwar for "Tere Mast Mast Do Nain"	Nominated	
Global Indian Music Academy Awards	30 October 2011	Best Female Playback Singer	Mamta Sharma for "Munni Badnaam Hui"	Nominated	
Global Indian Music Academy Awards	30 October 2011	Best Male Playback Singer	Rahat Fateh Ali Khan for "Tere Mast Mast Do Nain"	Nominated	
Global Indian Music Academy Awards	30 October 2011	Best Song	"Munni Badnaam Hui"	Nominated	
Global Indian Music Academy Awards	30 October 2011	Best Song	"Tere Mast Mast Do Nain"	Nominated	
BIG STAR IMA Awards	25 February 2011	Best Music Composer	Sajid–Wajid for "Tere Mast Mast Do Nain"	Won	
BIG STAR IMA Awards	25 February 2011	Best Album of the Year	Dabangg	Won	
BIG STAR IMA Awards	25 February 2011	Best Dance Song of the Year	"Munni Badnaam Hui"	Won	
BIG STAR IMA Awards	25 February 2011	Best Female Playback Singer	Mamta Sharma for "Munni Badnaam Hui"	Nominated	
BIG STAR IMA Awards	25 February 2011	Best Music Composer	Lalit Pandit for "Munni Badnaam Hui"	Nominated	
BIG STAR IMA Awards	25 February 2011	Best Background Score	Sandeep Shirodkar	Nominated	
Lions Gold Awards	11 January 2011	Favourite Sensational Singer	Mamta Sharma for "Munni Badnaam Hui"	Won	
Lions Gold Awards	11 January 2011	Favourite Music Director	Sajid–Wajid	Won	
Lions Gold Awards	11 January 2011	Favourite Choreographer	Farah Khan for "Munni Badnaam Hui"	Won	
FICCI Frames Excellence Honours Awards	26 March 2011	Best Music Director	Sajid–Wajid	Won	
Aaj Tak Awards	3 January 2012	Best Song	"Munni Badnaam Hui"	Won	
Rajiv Gandhi Achievers Awards	15 December 2010	Best Bollywood Remix	Romeo and DJ Deepesh for "Tere Mast Mast Do Nain"	Won	

== Legacy ==
The success of the film was attributed to the music album which helped in boosting the film's collections. "Tere Mast Mast Do Nain" and "Munni Badnaam Hui" eventually occurred in several year-end lists due to the commercial response of the tracks. Prashant Pawan of Rediff.com listed the two tracks in the first two positions, as was Hindustan Times. "Munni Badnaam Hui" was listed as one of the "100 Greatest Bollywood Songs of All Time" published by BBC's survey report. The track was played in a dance marathon in Australia with over 1,200 people danced non-stop to the track at Melbourne Park, eventually leading to be listed in the Guinness Book of World Records. Baradwaj Rangan listed the track in "10 best dance numbers of Bollywood that you could remember watching on the big-screen", an article that was published on the Film Companion website on 10 September 2020, coinciding with a decade of Dabangg's release. In 2021, was mentioned in a new school music curriculum at England about Bollywood, Indian folk, classical and Bhangra music.

After the track "Sheila Ki Jawani" featuring Katrina Kaif was released, parallels were drawn between Katrina and Malaika in "Munni Badnaam Hui", as well as between the item numbers. Subsequently, newspapers reported increased rivalry between the two actors, which was supposedly highlighted by various incidents. The two actors were later invited to perform their respective numbers at parties and other occasions, adding to the rivalry. Mamta Sharma, who sang "Munni Badnaam Hui" gained popularity after the raging response of the track, who later received several offers from films. She later, quit her career as a playback singer, owing to the criticism that, she was getting typecasted on singing item numbers. The track "Tere Naina Maar Hi Daalenge" also composed by Sajid–Wajid and sung by Shaan and Shreya Ghoshal, for the Salman Khan-starrer Jai Ho (2014), had similarities to "Tere Mast Mast Do Nain".

According to the composer Lalit Pandit, the track "Munni Badnaam Hui" got positive response from across the globe, and also stated that American pop singer Madonna danced to the song. He said:

Actually when the song had released, just after a little while, I was told that Madonna had finished her concert in New York and she took her band and team to a club in New York called The Blue. In the Blue, they were playing this song Munni Badnaam, she heard that, and apparently, she danced to this song many times. And she had it put again and again. So that was the first happy news about the song I got, it was an internationally connected incident. And then of course, the song went on to win all the awards that year. I have done many scores in my life and won so many awards as I did in Munni Badnaam.

== Future ==
For the second and third instalments of the Dabangg franchise — Dabangg 2 (2012) and Dabangg 3 (2019), Sajid–Wajid and Sandeep Shirodkar composed the songs and score, respectively, thereby continuing their association with the first film. The track "Hud Hud Dabangg" was recreated in the former under the title "Dabangg Reloaded" and in the latter, under the same title, with Shabab Sabri and Divya Kumar, singing the track instead of Sukhwinder Singh, who crooned for the original version and its recreation "Dabangg Reloaded". For Dabangg 2, two tracks "Pandeyji Seeti Maare" and "Fevicol Se" were used in place of the original track (Malaika Arora featured in the former), while "Munni Badnaam Hui" was recreated as "Munna Badnam Hua" for Dabangg 3, featuring Warina Hussain and Salman Khan. The original track's singer, Mamta Sharma also sang these tracks. In place of "Tere Mast Mast Do Nain", "Dagabaaz Re", "Habibi Ke Nain" and "Awaara" were composed for the two instalments. Music critics gave mixed reviews for the soundtracks for both the films criticising the quality of the tracks got deteriorated in comparison with the original film.

== Track listing ==
Dabangg (Original Motion Picture Soundtrack)
No.	Title	Lyrics	Music	Singer(s)	Length
1.	"Tere Mast Mast Do Nain" (Solo)	Faiz Anwar	Sajid–Wajid	Rahat Fateh Ali Khan	5:59
2.	"Munni Badnaam Hui"	Lalit Pandit	Lalit Pandit	Mamta Sharma, Aishwarya Nigam, Master Saleem	5:07
3.	"Chori Kiya Re Jiya"	Jalees Sherwani	Sajid–Wajid	Sonu Nigam, Shreya Ghoshal	4:48
4.	"Hud Hud Dabangg"	Jalees Sherwani	Sajid–Wajid	Sukhwinder Singh, Wajid	4:13
5.	"Tere Mast Mast Do Nain" (Duet)	Faiz Anwar	Sajid–Wajid	Rahat Fateh Ali Khan, Shreya Ghoshal	5:56
6.	"Humka Peeni Hai"	Jalees Sherwani	Sajid–Wajid	Wajid, Master Saleem, Shabab Sabri	5:15
7.	"Munni Badnaam Hui" (Remix)	Lalit Pandit	Lalit Pandit	Mamta Sharma, Aishwarya Nigam	4:05
8.	"Tere Mast Mast Do Nain" (Remix)	Faiz Anwar	Sajid–Wajid	Rahat Fateh Ali Khan	5:01
9.	"Humka Peeni Hai" (Remix)	Jalees Sherwani	Sajid–Wajid	Wajid, Master Saleem, Shabab Sabri	4:27
10.	"Dabangg" (Theme)	—	Sajid–Wajid	Salman Khan	2:48
Total length:					47:39
