= Band Baaja Baaraat (soundtrack) =

Soundtrack album by Salim–Sulaiman
- Released: 3 November 2010
- Studio: YRF Studios, Mumbai
- Genre: Feature film soundtrack
- Length: 37:59
- Language: Hindi
- Label: YRF Music
- Producer: Salim–Sulaiman

Salim–Sulaiman chronology
Aashayein (2010)	Band Baaja Baaraat (2010)	Ladies vs Ricky Bahl (2011)

Band Baaja Baaraat is the soundtrack album to the 2010 film of the same name directed by Maneesh Sharma and produced by Aditya Chopra of Yash Raj Films, starring Ranveer Singh and Anushka Sharma. The soundtrack featured nine songs composed by the duo Salim–Sulaiman and lyrics written by Amitabh Bhattacharya. It was released under the YRF Music label on 3 November 2010 to positive reviews.

== Background ==
The film's soundtrack and background score were composed by Salim–Sulaiman, who had notably composed for Chak De! India (2007), Roadside Romeo (2008), Rab Ne Bana Di Jodi (2008), Rocket Singh: Salesman of the Year (2009) and Pyaar Impossible! (2010). Salim described on the film's music, "A week before, I had gone to a wedding in Delhi, and the afterparty of that wedding had really cool music. So, I thought Band Baaja Baraat should have this kind of music." Sulaiman stated that the song "Ainvayi Ainvayi" was rejected by Sharma as he could not understand the lyrics. He recalled that Salim had requested Chopra to include the song, and the latter convinced Sharma that the song would become a chartbuster.

The album accompanied nine songs, including two remixes done by Abhijit Vaghani. Amitabh Bhattacharya, in his first mainstream endeavour, wrote lyrics for all the songs, which were sung by Sunidhi Chauhan, Benny Dayal, Shreya Ghoshal, Natalie Di Luccio, Himani Kapoor, Harshdeep Kaur, Labh Janjua, Shrraddha Pandit, Master Saleem, Sukhwinder Singh, Bhattacharya and Salim Merchant. Upon the album release, Yash Raj Films issued a press statement giving a description of each track. They described the opening song "Ainvayi Ainvayi" as "a funky, energetic number", "Tarkeebein" as a "youthful song with cool lyrics", "Aadha Ishq" as a "perfect love ballad", "Dum Dum" as a "unique, unabashed item number with a Sufi-rock feel", "Mitra" as "cool and contemporary", "Baari Barsi" as a "superbly re-orchestrated" traditional Punjabi wedding song and "Band Baaja Baaraat (Theme)" as "a pulsating track which perfectly represents the spirit of the movie".

== Release ==
The track list was unveiled on 3 November 2010 at the Yash Raj Studios in Andheri, Mumbai, and the film's music was commercially launched on 10 November 2010. The release coincided with a launch event held at the Reliance TimeOut store in Bandra, with the cast and crew members in attendance.

== Track listing ==
No.	Title	Singer(s)	Length
1.	"Ainvayi Ainvayi"	Salim Merchant and Sunidhi Chauhan	4:27
2.	"Tarkeebein"	Benny Dayal and Salim Merchant	4:49
3.	"Aadha Ishq"	Shreya Ghoshal and (additional vocals by Natalie Di Luccio)	4:43
4.	"Dum Dum"	Benny Dayal and Himani Kapoor	5:10
5.	"Mitra"	Amitabh Bhattacharya and Salim Merchant	4:02
6.	"Baari Barsi"	Harshdeep Kaur, Labh Janjua and Salim Merchant	4:42
7.	"Band Baaja Baaraat (Theme)"	Salim Merchant and Shraddha Pandit	1:52
8.	"Ainvayi Ainvayi (Dilli Club Mix)" (Remix by Abhijit Vaghani)	Master Saleem and Sunidhi Chauhan	3:45
9.	"Dum Dum (Sufi Mix)" (Remix by Abhijit Vaghani)	Sukhwinder Singh and Himani Kapoor	4:29
Total length:			37:59

== Reception ==
Ruchika Kher of Indo-Asian News Service gave a positive review, describing the album as a "fun-filled soundtrack" and called the dance numbers being the highlight. Karthik Srinivasan of Milliblog stated "Salim Sulaiman nail the sound brilliantly; the tunes work only occasionally". Joginder Tuteja for Bollywood Hungama described the music as "One of the better soundtracks that one has heard from the house of Yash Raj Films in last couple of years, Band Baaja Baaraat is also one of the best works of Salim-Sulaiman along with lyricist Amitabh Bhattacharya" and selected "Ainvayi Ainvayi", "Aadha Ishq" and "Dum Dum (Sufi Mix)" as the disc's best tracks. Sonil Dedhia of Rediff.com wrote "Music composers Salim-Sulaiman have done a good job as well. The songs are perfectly timed and in keeping with the mood of the film." Mayank Shekhar of Hindustan Times added "The music bears a strong mix of Bhangra. Here of course, it sounds entirely a derivative of tracks from Dev.D (Pardesi), Tashan (Dil Haara Re), Delhi-6 (Yeh Dilli Hai Mere Yaar), Aisha (Mithi Mithi Bol)."

== Awards and nominations ==
Award	Date of ceremony (Note: Date is linked to the article about the awards held that year, wherever possible.)	Category	Recipients	Result	Ref.
Apsara Film & Television Producers Guild Awards	12 January 2011	Best Female Playback Singer	Sunidhi Chauhan for "Ainvayi Ainvayi"	Nominated	
Stardust Awards	6 February 2011	New Musical Sensation – Female	Himani Kapoor for "Dum Dum"	Nominated	
International Indian Film Academy Awards	23–25 June 2011	Best Music Director	Salim–Sulaiman	Nominated	
International Indian Film Academy Awards	23–25 June 2011	Best Lyricist	Amitabh Bhattacharya for "Ainvayi Ainvayi"	Nominated	
International Indian Film Academy Awards	23–25 June 2011	Best Female Playback Singer	Sunidhi Chauhan for "Ainvayi Ainvayi"	Nominated	
International Indian Film Academy Awards	23–25 June 2011	Best Song Recording	Vijay Dayal for "Ainvayi Ainvayi"	Won	
Global Indian Music Academy Awards	30 October 2011	Best Film Album	Band Baaja Baarat	Nominated	
Global Indian Music Academy Awards	30 October 2011	Best Song	"Ainvayi Ainvayi"	Nominated	
Global Indian Music Academy Awards	30 October 2011	Best Music Director	Salim–Sulaiman	Nominated	
Global Indian Music Academy Awards	30 October 2011	Best Lyricist	Amitabh Bhattacharya for "Ainvayi Ainvayi"	Nominated	
Global Indian Music Academy Awards	30 October 2011	Best Female Playback Singer	Sunidhi Chauhan for "Ainvayi Ainvayi"	Nominated	
Global Indian Music Academy Awards	30 October 2011	Best Engineer – Film Album	Vijay Dayal for "Ainvayi Ainvayi"	Nominated	
Global Indian Music Academy Awards	30 October 2011	Best Engineer – Theatre Mix	Anuj Mathur for "Ainvayi Ainvayi"	Nominated	
Global Indian Music Academy Awards	30 October 2011	Best Music Arranger and Programmer	Salim–Sulaiman for "Ainvayi Ainvayi"	Nominated	
