= 56th Filmfare Awards =

2011 awards for Hindi cinema

- 56th Filmfare Awards
- Date: 29 January 2011
- Site: Yash Raj Studios, Mumbai
- Hosted by: Imran Khan; Ranbir Kapoor; Karan Johar; Vir Das; Prachi Desai; Anushka Sharma
- Official website: www.filmfare.com

Highlights
- Best Film: Dabangg
- Critics Award for Best Film: Udaan
- Most awards: Udaan (7)
- Most nominations: My Name Is Khan (10)

Television coverage
- Network: Sony Entertainment Television (India)

The 56th Filmfare Awards were held on 29 January 2011 at the Yash Raj Studios in Mumbai, honouring the best in Indian cinema for the year 2010. The nominations were announced on 13 January. The date of the function was unusual because generally the awards are hosted on the last Saturday of February. The date of the telecast is 6 February 2011.

My Name Is Khan led the ceremony with 10 nominations, followed by Dabangg and Udaan with 9 nominations each.

Udaan won 7 awards, including Best Film (Critics) (for Vikramaditya Motwane) and Best Supporting Actor (for Ronit Roy), thus becoming the most-awarded film at the ceremony.

Both Shah Rukh Khan (with his eighth Best Actor win) and Kajol (with her fifth Best Actress win) matched the records previously set by Dilip Kumar and Nutan (Kajol's aunt) in their respective categories. They both won the award for Karan Johar's My Name Is Khan, who also won Best Director.

Sisters Ratna Pathak Shah and Supriya Pathak were nominated for Best Supporting Actress for their performances in Golmaal 3 and Khichdi: The Movie, respectively, but both lost to Kareena Kapoor who won the award for We Are Family.

== Awards and nominees ==
=== Main awards ===
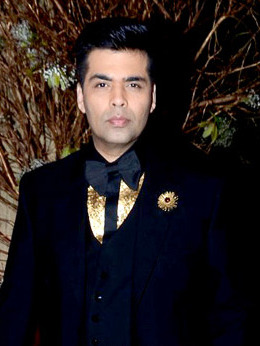
Karan Johar, Best Director

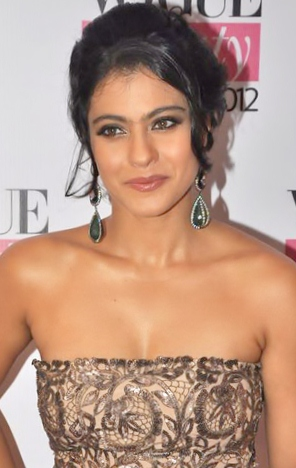
Kajol, Best Actress

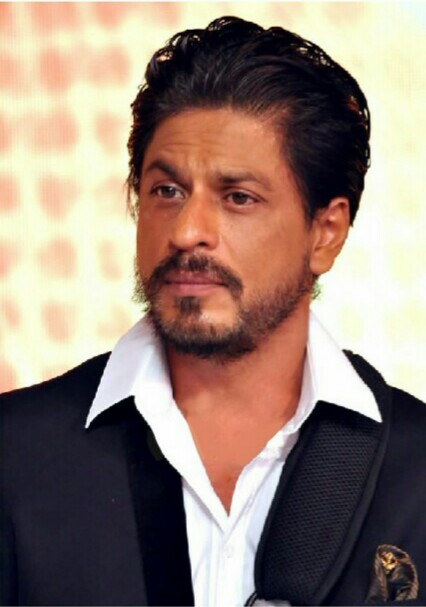
Shah Rukh Khan, Best Actor

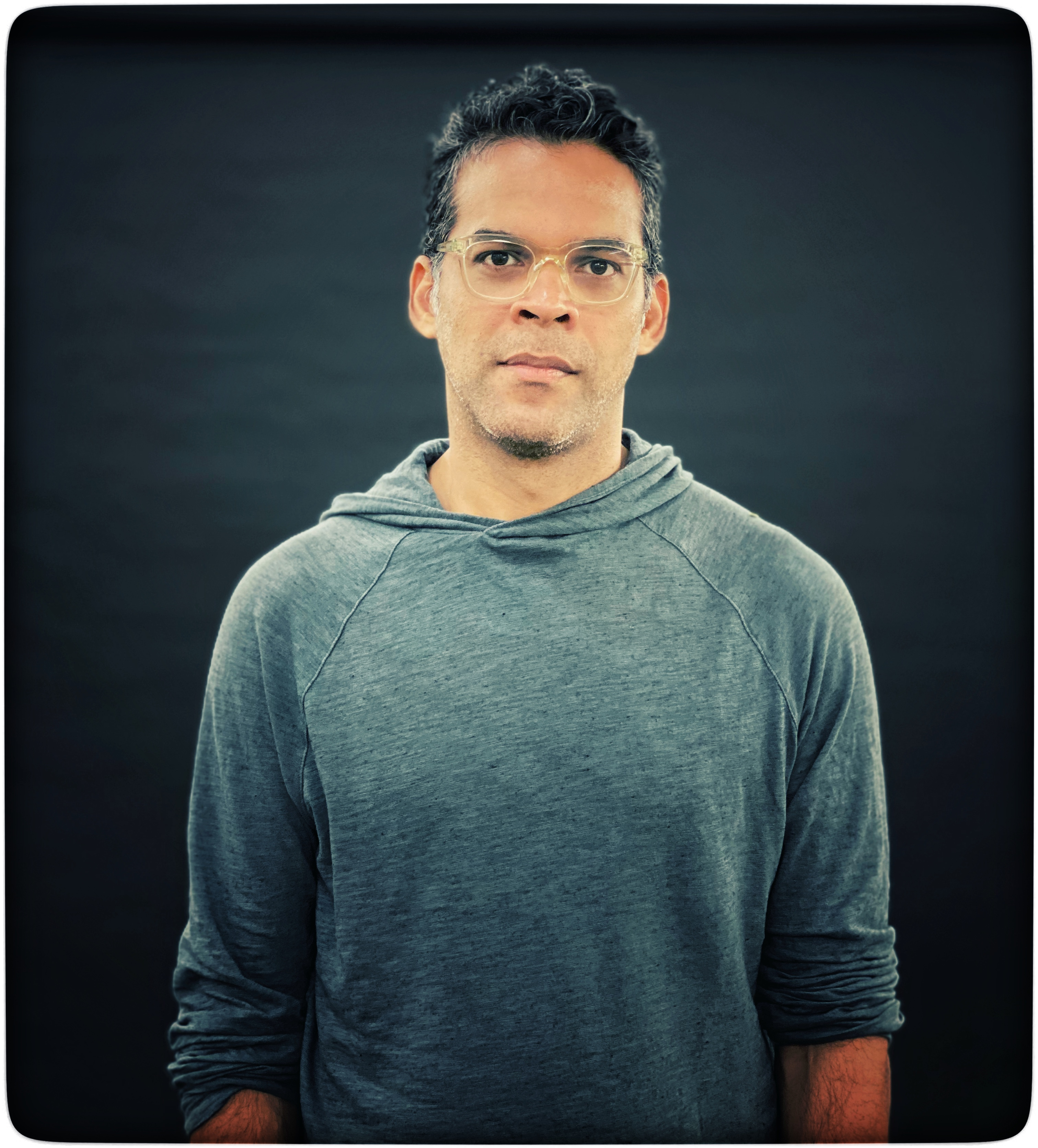
Vikramaditya Motwane, Best Director Critics

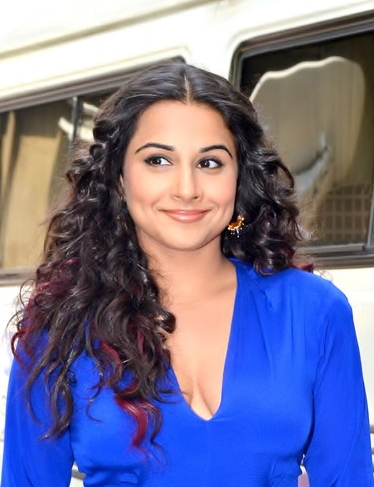
Vidya Balan, Best Actress Critics

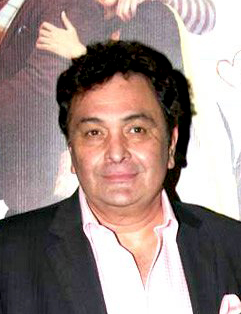
Rishi Kapoor, Best Actor Critics

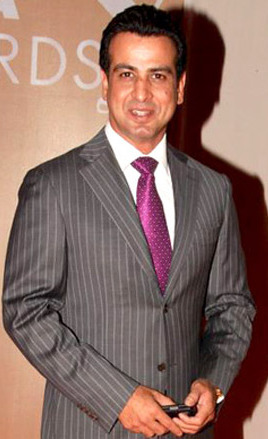
Ronit Roy, Best Supporting Actor

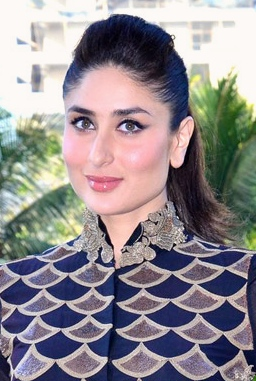
Kareena Kapoor, Best Supporting Actress

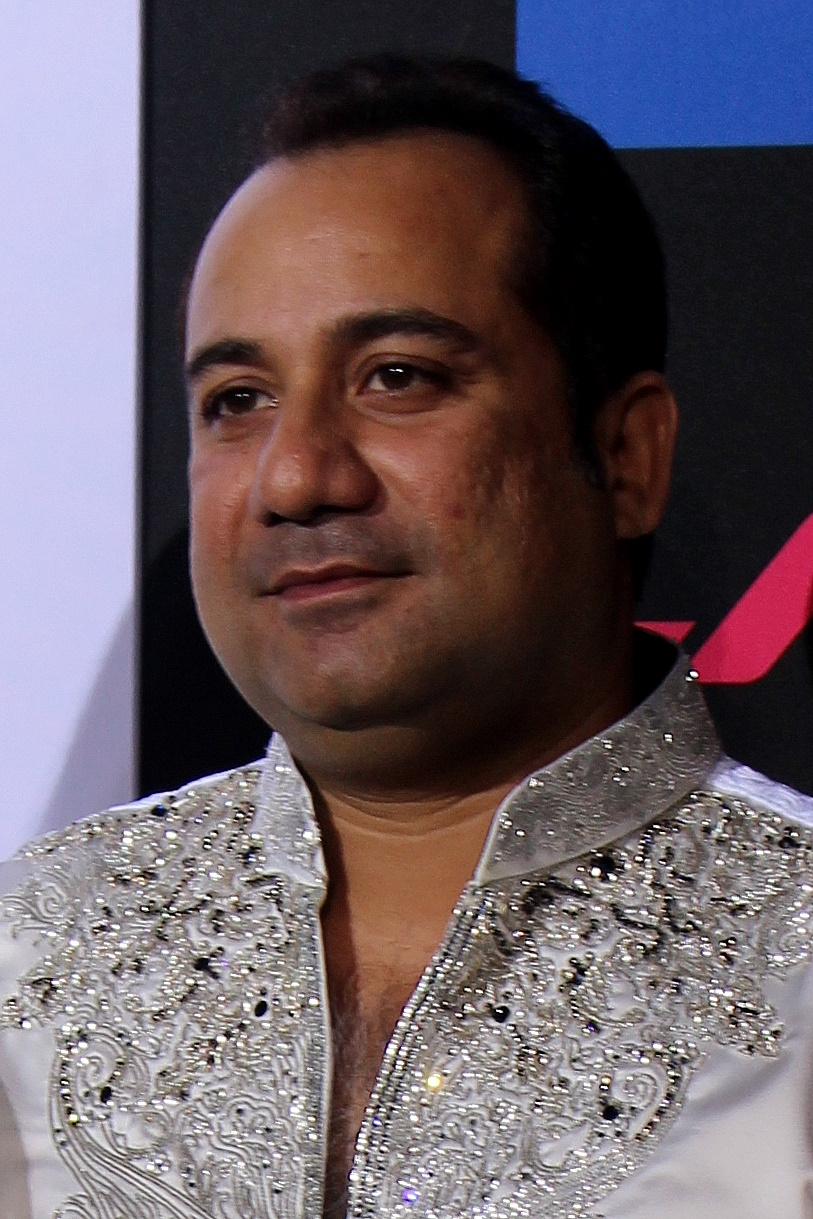
Rahat Fateh Ali Khan, Best Male Playback Singer

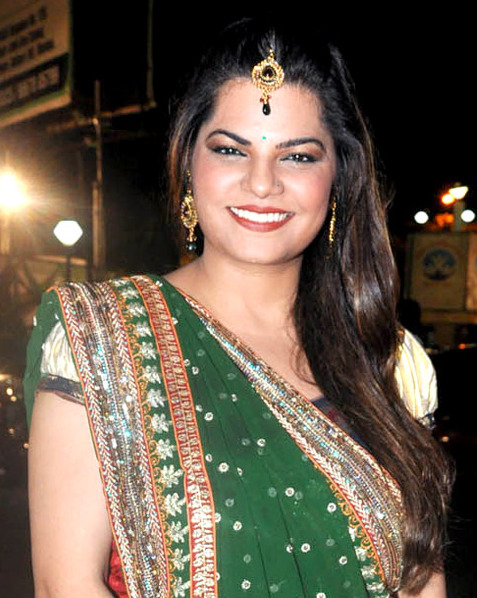
Mamta Sharma, Best Female Playback Singer

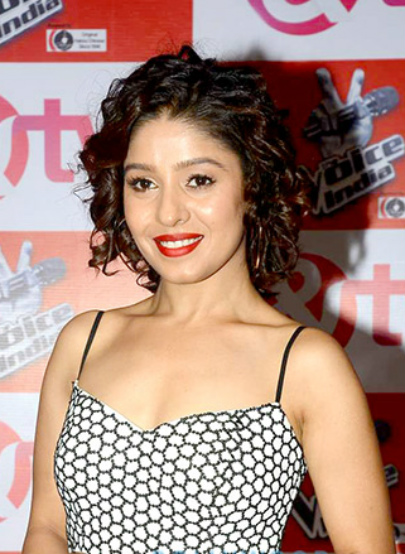
Sunidhi Chauhan, Best Female Playback Singer

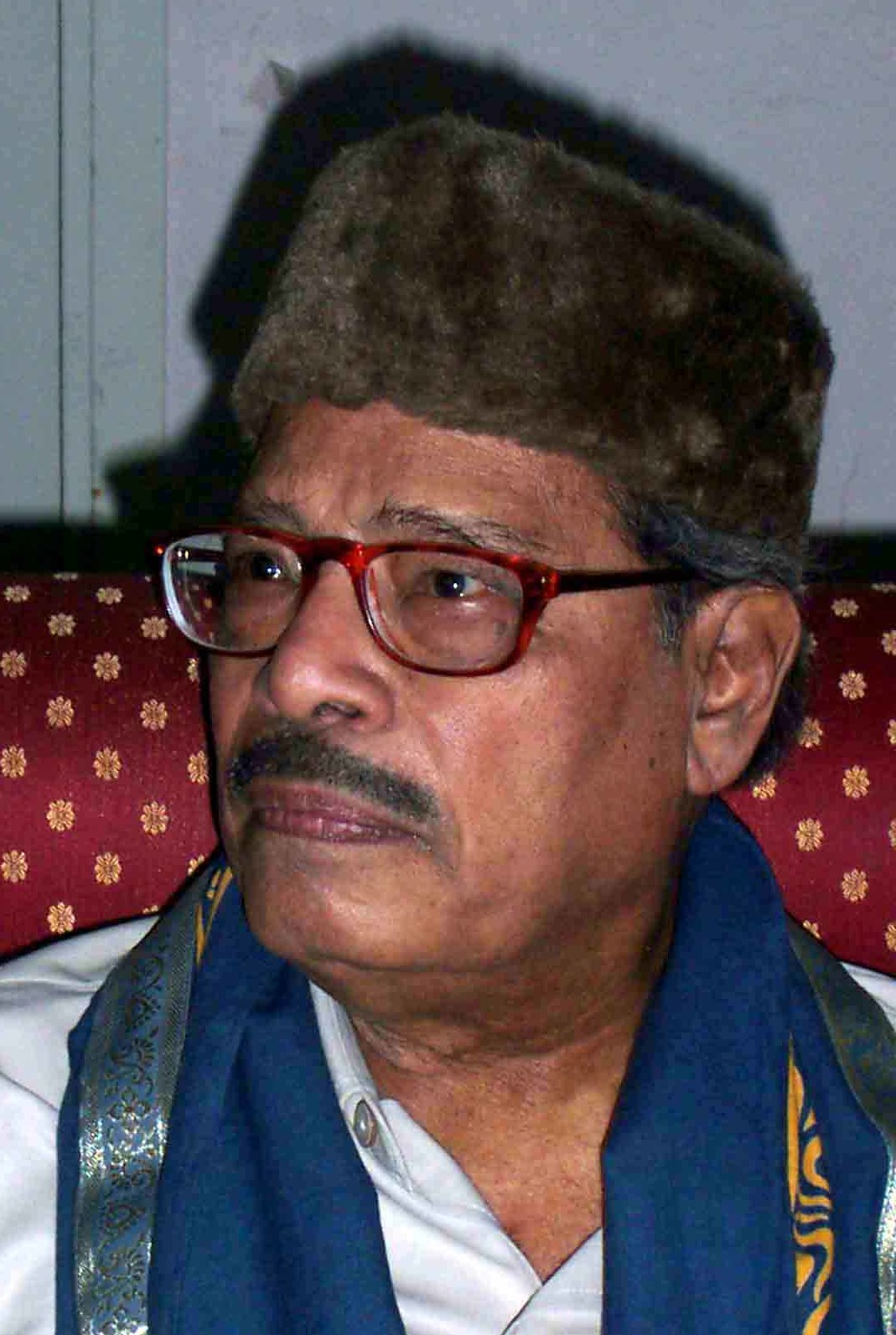
Manna Dey, Lifetime Achievement Awardee

Best Film	Best Director
Dabangg – Arbaaz Khan; Band Baaja Baaraat – Yash Chopra, Aditya Chopra; My Name Is Khan – Hiroo Johar, Gauri Khan; Peepli Live – Aamir Khan; Udaan – Ronnie Screwvala, Anurag Kashyap, Sanjay Singh	Karan Johar – My Name Is Khan; Abhinav Kashyap – Dabangg; Maneesh Sharma – Band Baaja Baaraat; Sanjay Leela Bhansali – Guzaarish; Vikramaditya Motwane – Udaan; Milan Luthria – Once Upon a Time in Mumbaai
Best Actor	Best Actress
Shah Rukh Khan – My Name Is Khan as Rizwan Khan; Ajay Devgn – Once Upon a Time in Mumbaai as Sultan Mirza; Hrithik Roshan – Guzaarish as Ethan Mascarenhas; Ranbir Kapoor – Raajneeti as Samar Pratap Singh; Salman Khan – Dabangg as Inspector Chulbul Pandey	Kajol – My Name Is Khan as Mandira Rathore Khan; Aishwarya Rai – Guzaarish as Sofia D'Souza; Anushka Sharma – Band Baaja Baaraat as Shruti Kakkar/Shruti Bittoo Sharma; Kareena Kapoor – Golmaal 3 as Daboo; Vidya Balan – Ishqiya as Krishna Verma
Best Supporting Actor	Best Supporting Actress
Ronit Roy – Udaan as Bhairav Singh; Arjun Rampal – Raajneeti as Prithviraj Pratap Singh; Arshad Warsi – Ishqiya as Razzak Hussain / Babban; Emraan Hashmi – Once Upon a Time in Mumbaai as Shoaib Khan; Manoj Bajpai – Raajneeti as Veerendra Pratap Singh; Nana Patekar – Raajneeti as Brijgopal Pratap Singh	Kareena Kapoor – We Are Family as Shreya Arora; Amrita Puri – Aisha as Shefali Thakur; Prachi Desai – Once Upon a Time in Mumbaai as Mumtaz; Ratna Pathak – Golmaal 3 as Geeta / Guddi; Supriya Pathak – Khichdi: The Movie as Hansa Praful Parekh
Best Male Debut	Best Female Debut
Ranveer Singh – Band Baaja Baaraat as Bittoo Sharma	Sonakshi Sinha – Dabangg as Rajjo
Best Music Director	Best Lyricist
Sajid–Wajid and Lalit Pandit – Dabangg; Pritam – Once Upon a Time in Mumbaai; Shankar–Ehsaan–Loy – My Name Is Khan; Vishal–Shekhar – Anjaana Anjaani; Vishal–Shekhar – I Hate Luv Storys; Vishal Bhardwaj – Ishqiya	Gulzar – "Dil Toh Bachcha Hai Ji" from Ishqiya; Faiz Anwar – "Tere Mast Mast Do Nain" from Dabangg; Niranjan Iyengar – "Noor-e-Khuda" from My Name Is Khan; Niranjan Iyengar – "Sajda" from My Name Is Khan; Vishal Dadlani – "Bin Tere" from I Hate Luv Storys
Best Playback Singer – Male	Best Playback Singer – Female
Rahat Fateh Ali Khan – "Dil Toh Bachcha Hai Ji" from Ishqiya; Adnan Sami and Shankar Mahadevan – "Noor-e-Khuda" from My Name Is Khan; Mohit Chauhan – "Pee Loon" from Once Upon a Time in Mumbaai; Rahat Fateh Ali Khan – "Sajda" from My Name Is Khan; Shafqat Amanat Ali – "Bin Tere" from I Hate Luv Storys	Mamta Sharma – "Munni Badnaam Hui" from Dabangg; Sunidhi Chauhan – "Sheila Ki Jawani" from Tees Maar Khan; Shreya Ghoshal – "Bahara" from I Hate Luv Storys; Shreya Ghoshal – "Noor-e-Khuda" from My Name Is Khan; Sunidhi Chauhan – "Udi" from Guzaarish

=== Critics' awards ===
Best Movie (Best Director)
Udaan (Vikramaditya Motwane)
Best Actor	Best Actress
Rishi Kapoor – Do Dooni Chaar as Santosh Duggal	Vidya Balan – Ishqiya as Krishna Verma

=== Technical awards ===
Best Story	Best Screenplay
Anurag Kashyap, Vikramaditya Motwane – Udaan	Anurag Kashyap, Vikramaditya Motwane – Udaan
Best Dialogue	Best Editing
Habib Faisal – Do Dooni Chaar	Namrata Rao – Love Sex aur Dhokha
Best Choreography	Best Cinematography
Farah Khan – "Sheila Ki Jawani" from Tees Maar Khan	Mahendra Shetty – Udaan
Best Production Design	Best Sound Design
Mukund Gupta – Do Dooni Chaar	Kunal Sharma – Udaan (tie) Pritam Das – Love Sex aur Dhokha
Best Costume Design	Best Background Score
Varsha and Shilpa – Do Dooni Chaar	Amit Trivedi – Udaan
Best Special Effects	Best Action
	Vijayan Master – Dabangg

=== Special awards ===
Lifetime Achievement
- Manna Dey
RD Burman Award
- Sneha Khanwalkar for Love Sex aur Dhokha
Best Scene
- Golmaal 3
Special Award
- Amitabh Bachchan
  – for completing 40 years in the Indian film industry.
- Madhuri Dixit
  – for completing 25 years in the Indian film industry.

== Multiple wins ==
The following films received multiple awards and nominations.

Movie	Awards
Udaan	7
Dabangg	6
Do Dooni Chaar	4
Ishqiya	3
Love Sex aur Dhokha	3
My Name Is Khan	3
Tees Maar Khan	2
Band Baaja Baaraat	2

== Partners ==
- Idea Cellular – Title Sponsor
- PC Jeweller – Associate Sponsor
- Sony Entertainment Television – Telecast Partner
- Whyte and Mackay from United Spirits – Beverage Partner
- Bright Outdoor Media – Outdoor partner
- Big Cinemas – Multiplex Partner

== See also ==
- Filmfare Awards
- Bollywood films of 2010
