= Ready (soundtrack) =

Soundtrack album by Pritam and Devi Sri Prasad
- Released: 29 April 2011
- Recorded: 2010–2011
- Genre: Feature film soundtrack
- Length: 34:18
- Language: Hindi
- Label: T-Series
- Producer: Pritam

Pritam chronology
Kucch Luv Jaisaa (2011)	Ready (2011)	Always Kabhi Kabhi (2011)

Devi Sri Prasad chronology
100% Love (2011)	Ready (2011)	Venghai (2011)

Ready is the soundtrack album to the 2011 film of the same name directed by Anees Bazmee, starring Salman Khan and Asin. The film's soundtrack featured eight tracks composed by Pritam, with one song by Devi Sri Prasad, with lyrics written by Amitabh Bhattacharya, Ashish Pandit, Neelesh Misra and Kumaar. The soundtrack was released through T-Series on 29 April 2011 to positive reviews. The songs "Dhinka Chinka" and "Character Dheela" achieved widespread commercial success.

== Development ==
The original soundtrack to Ready was composed by Pritam, who had collaborated with Bazmee on Singh Is Kinng (2008), No Problem (2010) and Thank You (2011). Ready is also Pritam's maiden collaboration with Salman; the album featured three original songs with lyrics written by Amitabh Bhattacharya, Neelesh Misra and Kumaar. The film score is composed by Sandeep Shirodkar. Upon the completion of the film's music, Bhushan Kumar, head of T-Series, presented Pritam a BMW car as a token of appreciation.

Salman had listened to the item song "Ringa Ringa" from the Telugu film Arya 2 (2009) and eventually liked it and discussed with Bhushan to reach out the original composer Devi Sri Prasad. Since it was difficult to buy the rights, they insisted on Prasad creating a Hindi version of the song. Being interested in Bollywood, Prasad agreed to remake the song as "Dhinka Chinka" and retained the hook music, but the lyrics were tweaked to North Indian sensibilities by guest lyricist Ashish Pandit. However, they had to convince Pritam who was apprehensive about sharing credits. When Salman and Bhushan discussed with Pritam about the need for the song and explained how "Munni Badnaam Hui", written and composed by Lalit Pandit, became the center of attraction while the rest of the Dabangg album was composed by Sajid–Wajid, Pritam agreed on the condition that Prasad's inclusion be confirmed only after the first look poster release, to which both Salman and Bhushan agreed.

== Release ==
The soundtrack was launched at the Film City, Mumbai on 29 April 2011 with the cast and crew being present at the event.

== Track listing ==
No.	Title	Lyrics	Music	Singer(s)	Length
1.	"Character Dheela"	Amitabh Bhattacharya	Pritam	Neeraj Shridhar, Amrita Kak	3:47
2.	"Humko Pyaar Hua"	Neelesh Misra	Pritam	K.K., Tulsi Kumar	5:28
3.	"Dhinka Chika"	Ashish Pandit	Devi Sri Prasad	Mika Singh, Amrita Kak	4:32
4.	"Meri Ada Bhi"	Kumaar	Pritam	Rahat Fateh Ali Khan, Tulsi Kumar	4:05
5.	"Dhinka Chika" (Remixed by DJ A-Myth)	Ashish Pandit	Devi Sri Prasad	Mika Singh, Amrita Kak	4:45
6.	"Humko Pyaar Hua" (Remixed by DJ A-Myth)	Neelesh Misra	Pritam	K.K., Tulsi Kumar	4:45
7.	"Character Dheela" (Remixed by DJ A-Myth)	Amitabh Bhattacharya	Pritam	Neeraj Shridhar, Amrita Kak	3:06
8.	"Meri Ada Bhi" (Remixed by DJ A-Myth)	Kumaar	Pritam	Rahat Fateh Ali Khan, Tulsi Kumar	3:50
Total length:					34:18

== Reception ==
Joginder Tuteja of Bollywood Hungama rated the album favourably, awarding it four stars out of five, stating that despite the limited number of songs, he found that both "Dhinka Chika" and "Character Dheela" have a potential to be "not just huge hits musically but also turn out to be massive crowd pullers." Sukanya Verma of Rediff.com while giving it two and a half stars out of five stated that, despite not being a song-heavy album, it got "at least two potential mass favourites, complementing its leading man's stylish, crowd-pleasing personality, to offer."

Shivesh Kumar of India Weekly awarded the album 4 out of 5 stars and ranked "Character Dheela" in the fifth position in his weekly music chart. Rahul Gangwani of Filmfare gave it 4 out of 5 stars quoting "Rarely do we come across music albums which completely personify the lead actor's personality. Ready does that." A reviewer from Indo-Asian News Service wrote "the soundtrack is packed with fun tracks that are meant to liven up your evenings and parties." Karthik Srinivasan of Milliblog wrote "Composer Devi Sri Prasad clearly owns this soundtrack with his single, tried and tested material".

== Awards and nominations ==
Awards	Category	Recipients and nominees	Results
Stardust Awards	Standout Performance by a Lyricist	Ashish Pandit for "Dhinka Chika"	Won
Zee Cine Awards	Best Song of the Year	"Character Dheela"	Nominated
4th Mirchi Music Awards	Best Item Song of the Year	"Character Dheela"	Nominated
Ghanta Awards	Worst Song	"Dhinka Chika"	Won

== Controversies ==
Composer Anu Malik alleged that the song "Character Dheela" is an unauthorised copy of his "Mohabbat Naam Hai" from the 2001 film Ajnabee. He told the media that he will likely file a suit against Pritam for plagiarism. The songwriter Turkish Mohammed Azam filed a plagiarism suit against Pritam, claiming the lyrics for "Character Dheela" were copied from a song he wrote in 2007. The Bombay High Court dismissed the case, ruling that since Pritam is not the lyricist he could not be held liable.

== Impact ==
Bhushan claimed that despite the trends in music sales being shifted to streaming, downloads and ringtones, the album fetched record sales which was termed as "phenomenal push in terms of actual album sales" and attributed it to the music compositions and the prowess of Salman. "Dhinka Chika" and "Character Dheela" topped the music charts after its release.

Prasad who expressed his interest in composing Bollywood films, had denied such offers because of time constraints, and wanted to work with big stars and big banners for a Bollywood breakthrough. He further added that the success of "Dhinka Chika" helped him to start a full-fledged career in Bollywood. Prasad then composed for Maximum (2012), Jai Ho (2014), Bhaag Johnny (2016), Radhe (2021), Drishyam 2, Cirkus (both 2022) and Kisi Ka Bhai Kisi Ki Jaan (2023). Most of his sole compositions except for Jai Ho, Drishyam 2, Cirkus and Kisi Ka Bhai Kisi Ki Jaan, were remakes of his Telugu compositions.

The success of "Dhinka Chinka" also prompted Khan to perform the hook step at multiple events.

"Character Dheela" was later recreated by Pritam as "Character Dheela 2.0" for the Kartik Aaryan-starrer Shehzada (2023).
