= No One Killed Jessica (soundtrack) =

Soundtrack album by Amit Trivedi
- Released: 17 December 2010
- Genre: Feature film soundtrack
- Length: 29:14
- Language: Hindi
- Label: Saregama India Ltd.
- Producer: Amit Trivedi

Amit Trivedi chronology
| I Am (2010) | No One Killed Jessica (2010) | Chillar Party (2011) |

No One Killed Jessica is the soundtrack album to the 2010 film of the same name directed by Raj Kumar Gupta starring Vidya Balan and Rani Mukerji. The film's musical score and soundtrack were provided by Amit Trivedi with lyrics written by Amitabh Bhattacharya, and was released on 17 December 2010 through the label Saregama India Ltd.

== Development ==
Amit Trivedi composed the soundtrack for No One Killed Jessica in his second collaboration with Gupta after Aamir (2008). Gupta, who wanted to "open the film with a bang", suggested a rock song based on the capital city Delhi. The track "Dilli" was the first track to be composed, with other songs following afterwards.

Trivedi mentioned that all the remaining songs consisted of different flavors and colors that represent the characters' state of mind, as well as the film's narrative. "Ali Re" was described as the hardest song to compose according to Trivedi, which made him "stuck on it for a very long time." Based on Mukerji's character who was vibrant and rebellious, the song had to match the energy as well as suit the film's themes. He worked on two months developing the song. Trivedi composed the music and score at his studio, sometimes until 04:00 in the early morning.

== Release ==
The album was distributed by Saregama India Ltd. and was launched at the fourth season of the reality show Bigg Boss on 24 December 2010 with the audio CD was launched by the show's host Salman Khan, with Balan and Mukerji.

== Reception ==
The soundtrack received mixed reviews from critics. Joginder Tuteja, writing for Bollywood Hungama, called it "good" and "above expectations", particularly praising the compositions of "Dilli" which she described "racy, ferocious, vociferous, energetic and relentless". Giving the album a rating of two-and-a-half stars, Nikhil Hemrajani of the Hindustan Times saying, "Overall, the soundtrack fails to contain a cohesive sound and is rather mediocre." A reviewer based at Indo-Asian News Service, mentioned that Trivedi "has given impressive music which is sure to create a stir." Karthik Srinivasan of Milliblog wrote "Amit Trivedi strikes again".

Savera R. Someshwar of Rediff.com wrote "Composer Amit Trivedi has done a superlative job with the music; this is an album that's clearly worth buying." Gaurav Malani of The Times of India wrote "the film boasts of a sharp soundtrack and seething background score composed by Amit Trivedi." Sudhish Kamath of The Hindu mentioned the song "Dilli" as "an instant hit".

== Track listing ==
All lyrics are written by Amitabh Bhattacharya.

| No. | Title | Singer(s) | Length |
|---|---|---|---|
| 1. | "Dilli" | Aditi Singh Sharma, Shriram Iyer, Tochi Raina | 3:52 |
| 2. | "Aali Re" | Aditi Singh Sharma, Anushka Manchanda, Biswajit Chakraborty, Raja Hasan, Shriram Iyer, Sonika Sharma, Sonu Kakkar, Tochi Raina | 4:54 |
| 3. | "Yeh Pal" | Shilpa Rao | 6:00 |
| 4. | "Aitbaar" | Mame Khan, Robert Bob Omulo, Vishal Dadlani | 4:41 |
| 5. | "Dua" | Amitabh Bhattacharya, Joi Barua, Meenal Jain, Raman Mahadevan | 5:56 |
| 6. | "Dilli" (Hardcore) | Aditi Singh Sharma, Shriram Iyer, Tochi Raina | 3:51 |
| Total length: | | | 29:14 |

== Accolades ==
| Award | Date of ceremony (Note: Date is linked to the article about the awards held that year, wherever possible.) | Category | Recipient(s) and nominee(s) | Result | Ref(s) |
|---|---|---|---|---|---|
| Screen Awards | 14 January 2012 | Best Background Music | Amit Trivedi | Nominated | |
| Stardust Awards | 26 February 2012 | New Musical Sensation – Female | Aditi Singh Sharma (for "Dilli") | Nominated | |
