= 2011 Zee Cine Awards =

Zee Cine Awards 2011 was held in Marina Bay Sands, Singapore

== Hosts ==
- Akshay Kumar
- Sajid Khan
- Neha Dhupia

== Performances ==
- Priyanka Chopra Dance and Presentation of Best Film Nominees
- Arjun Rampal
- Kids from Dance India Dance in honour of Super Jodi Rishi Kapoor & Neetu Singh
- Aishwarya Rai
- Deepika Padukone
- Shahrukh Khan Dance on Song Noor-E-Khuda and Honouring Hrithik Roshan & Suzanne (Khan) Roshan

== Awards ==
The official Winners are listed Below.

=== Viewer's choice ===
Category	Winner	Work
Best Film	Arbaaz Khan	Dabangg
Best Director	Karan Johar	My Name Is Khan
Best Actor	Shahrukh Khan	My Name Is Khan
Best Actress	Vidya Balan	Ishqiya
Best Track of the Year	Munni Badnaam Hui	Dabangg

=== Jury's choice ===
Category	Winner	Work
Best Film (Critics)	Anurag Kashyap	Udaan
Best Director (Critics)	Vikramaditya Motwane	Udaan
Best Actor (Critics)	Hrithik Roshan	Guzaarish
Best Actress (Critics)	Aishwarya Rai	Guzaarish
Best Supporting Actor	Arjun Rampal	Raajneeti
Best Supporting Actress	Prachi Desai	Once Upon A Time In Mumbaai
Best Villain	Ronit Roy	Udaan
Best Comedian	Boman Irani	Well Done Abba
Most Promising Director	Abhinav Kashyap	Dabangg
Best Male Debut	Ranveer Singh	Band Baaja Baaraat
Best Female Debut	Sonakshi Sinha	Dabangg
Best Male Playback Singer	Mohit Chauhan for "Pee Loon"	Once Upon a Time in Mumbaai
Best Female Playback Singer	Richa Sharma for "Sajda"	My Name is Khan
Best Music Director	Sajid–Wajid	Dabangg
Best Lyricist	Gulzar for "Dil To Bachcha Hai Ji"	Ishqiya
Lifetime Achievement	Shatrughan Sinha	Contribution to Hindi Cinema
International Icon – Male	Ranbir Kapoor
International Icon - Female	Deepika Padukone

=== Technical Awards ===
Category	Winner	Work
Best Background Music	Sandeep Shirodkar	Dabangg
Best Dialogue	Rajat Arora	Once Upon a Time in Mumbaai
Best Story	Shibani Bathija	My Name Is Khan
Best Screenplay	Abhinav Kashyap & Dileep Shukla	Dabangg
Best Cinematography	Ayananka Bose	Kites
Best Editing	Pranav V Dhiwar	Dabangg
Best Choreography	Farah Khan for "Sheila Ki Jawani"	Tees Maar Khan
Best Action	Vijayan Master	Dabangg
Best Art Direction	Rajneesh Basu	Guzaarish
Best Sound Design	Dileep Subramaniam	My Name Is Khan

== See also ==
- Zee Cine Awards
- Bollywood
- Cinema of India
