= GiMA Award for Best Film Song =

The GiMA Best Film Song is given by Global Indian Music Academy as a part of its annual Global Indian Music Academy Awards to recognise Hindi film songs.

== List of winners ==
- 2010 Iktara – Wake Up Sid
- 2011 "Pee Loon" – Once Upon A Time In Mumbaai
  - "Ainvayi Ainvayi" - Band Baaja Baaraat
  - "Munni Badnaam Hui" - Dabangg
  - "Sheila Ki Jawani" - Tees Maar Khan
  - "Tere Mast Mast Do Nain" - Dabangg
- 2012 "Chammak Challo" – Ra.One
  - "Ishq Sufiyana" - The Dirty Picture
  - "Nadaan Parinde" - Rockstar
  - "Señorita" - Zindagi Na Milegi Dobara
  - "Subha Hone Na De" - Desi Boyz
  - "Teri Meri" - Bodyguard
- 2013 – (no award given)
- 2014 "Tum Hi Ho" – Aashiqui 2
  - "Badtameez Dil" - Yeh Jawaani Hai Deewani
  - "Chahu Main Ya Na" - Aashiqui 2
  - "Lungi Dance" - Chennai Express
  - "Sawaar Loon" - Lootera
  - "Sunn Raha Hai" - Aashiqui 2
- 2015 "London Thumakda" – Queen
  - "Baby Doll" - Ragini MMS 2
  - "Galliyan" - Ek Villain
  - "Mast Magan" - 2 States
  - "Tu Meri" - Bang Bang!
- 2016 "Gerua" - Dilwale
  - "Agar Tum saath Ho" – Tamasha
  - "Pinga" - Bajirao Mastani
  - "Sooraj Dooba Hain" - Roy
  - "Moh Moh Ke Dhaage" - Dum Laga Ke Haisha
- 2020 "Apna Time Ayega" - Gully Boy
  - "Munna Badnaam Hua" – Dabangg 3
  - "Dheeme Dheeme" - Pati Patni Aur Woh
  - "Don't Be Shy" - Bala
  - "Makhna" - Drive

== See also ==
- Bollywood
- Cinema of India
