= 3rd Mirchi Music Awards =

Hindi music awards

- Sponsored by: Uninor
- Date: January 27, 2011
- Location: Bandra Kurla Complex, Mumbai
- Country: India
- Presented by: Radio Mirchi
- Hosted by: Shaan and Sonu Nigam

Highlights
- Most awards: Dabangg (8)
- Most nominations: Dabangg (13)
- Song of the Year: "Munni Badnaam" - Dabangg
- Album of the Year: Dabangg
- Website: Music Mirchi Awards 2010

Television/radio coverage
- Network: Sony TV

The 3rd Mirchi Music Awards, presented by Radio Mirchi, honored the best of Hindi music from the year 2010. The ceremony was held on 27 January 2011 at the Bandra Kurla Complex, Mumbai, and was hosted by Shaan and Sonu Nigam. The program featured many performances, including those by Bappi Lahiri, Usha Uthup, DJ Lloyd, Akshay Kumar, Anushka Sharma, Rishi Kapoor, Yo Yo Honey Singh & Priyanka Chopra. Several award categories were introduced for the first time, including Best Indipop Song, Best Item Number, Best Raag Inspired Song, Best song in Sufi Tradition, and Best Album of Golden Era. Dabangg won a leading eight awards including Album of the Year and Song of the Year for "Munni Badnaam".

The First Mirchi Music awards was held on 2009 and was hosted by Radio Mirchi 98.3 FM.

== Winners and nominees ==
The winners were selected by the members of a jury, chaired by Javed Akhtar. The following are the names of nominees and winners.

(Winners are listed first, highlighted in boldface.)

=== Film awards ===
Song of the Year	Album of the Year
**"Munni Badnaam"** - **Dabangg**; "Tere Mast Mast Do Nain" - Dabangg; "Sajda" - My Name is Khan; "Tere Naina" - My Name is Khan; "Sheila Ki Jawani" - Tees Maar Khan	**"Dabangg"** - **Sajid–Wajid, Lalit Pandit, Faiz Anwar, Jalees Sherwani**; "Break Ke Baad" - Vishal–Shekhar, Prasoon Joshi; "Ishqiya" - Vishal Bhardwaj, Gulzar; "My Name is Khan" - Shankar–Ehsaan–Loy, Niranjan Iyengar; "Once Upon A Time In Mumbaai" - Pritam, Irshad Kamil, Neelesh Misra, Amitabh Bhattacharya
Male Vocalist of the Year	Female Vocalist of the Year
**Rahat Fateh Ali Khan - "Tere Mast Mast Do Nain"** from **Dabangg**; Aadesh Shrivastava - "Mora Piya" from Raajneeti; Mohit Chauhan - "Pee Loon" from Once Upon A Time In Mumbai; Rahat Fateh Ali Khan and Shankar Mahadevan - "Sajdaa" from My Name is Khan; Shankar Mahadevan - "Uff Teri Adaa" from Karthik Calling Karthik	**Mamta Sharma and Aishwarya - "Munni Badnaam"** from **Dabangg**; Richa Sharma - "Sajdaa" from My Name is Khan; Shreya Ghoshal - "Chori Kiya Re Jiya" from Dabangg; Sunidhi Chauhan - "Udi" from Guzaarish; Sunidhi Chauhan - "Sheila Ki Jawani" fromTees Maar Khan
Music Composer of the Year	Lyricist of the Year
**Sajid–Wajid - "Tere Mast Mast Do Nain"** from **Dabangg**; Lalit Pandit - "Munni Badnaam" from Dabangg; Pritam - "Pee Loon" from Once Upon A Time In Mumbaai; Shankar–Ehsaan–Loy - "Sajdaa" from My Name is Khan; Vishal Bhardwaj - "Dil To Bachcha Hai" from Ishqiya	**Gulzar - "Dil To Bachcha Hai"** from **Ishqiya**; Faiz Anwar - "Tere Mast Mast Do Nain" from Dabangg; Gulzar - "Surili Akhiyon Wale" from Veer; Niranjan Iyengar - "Sajdaa" from My Name is Khan; Niranjan Iyengar - "Tere Naina" from My Name is Khan
Upcoming Male Vocalist of the Year	Upcoming Female Vocalist of the Year
**Mustafa Kutoane and Kirti Sagathia - "Beera"** from **Raavan**; Bhadwai Village Mandali - "Mehngai Dayain" from Peepli Live; Mohammed Irfan - "Salaam Zindagi" from Lamhaa; Mohan - "Naav" from Udaan; Najam Sheraz - "Tere Bina Jiya Na Jaye" from Shaapit	**Mamta Sharma - "Munni Badnaam"** from **Dabangg**; Antara Mitra - "Bheegi Si Bhaagi Si" from Rajneeti; Sukanya Purayastha - "Kaisi Hai Yeh Udaasi" from Karthik Calling Karthik; Vibhavari Joshi - "Saiba" from Guzaarish
Upcoming Music Composer of The Year	Upcoming Lyricist of The Year
**Shiraz Uppal - "Rabba"** from **Aashayein**; Bhadwai Village Mandali - "Mehngai Dayain" from Peepli Live; Nageen Tanvir - "Chola Maati Ke Ram" from Peepli Live; Sanjay Leela Bhansali - "Udi" from Guzaarish; Tarun and Vinayak - "Rabba Rabba" from Allah Ke Banday	**Bhadwai Village Mandali - "Mehngai Dayain"** from **Peepli Live**; Late Jagdish Joshi and Vibhu Puri - "Keh Na Sakoon" from Guzaarish; Noon Meem Rashid - "Chola Maati Ke Ram" from Peepli Live; Shakeel Sohail - "Rabba" from Aashayein; Vibhu Puri - "Sau Gram Zindagi" from Guzaarish
Song representing Sufi tradition	Raag-Inspired Song of the Year
**"Sajdaa"** - **My Name is Khan**; "Aas Pass Khuda" - Anjaana Anjaani; "Rehmat Zara" - Lamhaa; "Mora Piya" - Raajneeti; "Ranjha Ranjha" - Raavan	**"Kaare Kaare Badra"** - **Mirch**; "Badi Dheere Jali" - Ishqiya; "Mann Bhi Hai" - Mirch; "Sajdaa" - My Name is Khan; "Tum Jo Aaye" - Once Upon a Time in Mumbaai
Best Item Song of the Year
**"Munni Badnaam"** - **Dabangg**; "Aapka Kya Hoga (Dhanno)" - Housefull; "Aila Re Aila" - Khatta Meetha; "Parda" - Once Upon a Time in Mumbaai; "Sheila Ki Jawani" - Tees Maar Khan

=== Technical awards ===
Best Programmer & Arranger of the Year	Best Song Recording
**Shankar–Ehsaan–Loy - "Noor-E-Khuda"** from **My Name Is Khan**; Jim Satya, Johan Folke and DJ Phukan - "Mere Bina" from Crook; Hitesh Sonik and Clinton Cerejo - "Dil To Bachcha Hai" from Ishqiya; Amar Makwana, Mani Iyer and Sandeep Chatterjie - "Mora Piya" from Raajneeti; A. R. Rahman - "Ranjha Ranjha" from Raavan	**Salman Khan Afridi and Farhad K Dadyburjor - "Dil To Bachcha Hai"** from **Ishqiya**; Abani Tanti - "Munni Badnaam" from Dabangg; Abhay Rumde, Sameer Khan and Ashish Saksena - "Oh Girl You're Mine" from Housefull; Abhay Rumde, Sameeer Khan, Kim Koshie, Chinmay Harshe and Vijay Benegal - "Uff Teri Adaa" from Karthik Calling Karthik; Anil Kumar Konakandla and Biswadeep Chatterjee - "Man Lafanga" from Lafangey Parindey
Best Background Score of the Year
**Sandeep Shirodkar - Dabangg**; A. R. Rahman - Raavan; Shankar–Ehsaan–Loy - My Name Is Khan; Tubby-Parik - Guzaarish; Wayne Sharpe - Raajneeti

=== Non-film awards ===
Indie Pop Song of the Year
- **"Chaska"** from **The Crown**
  - "Aman Ki Asha" from Aman Ki Asha
  - "Kyun Dooriyan" from Kyun Dooriyan
  - "Rehnuma" from Rehnuma
  - "Mahiya" from Kyun Dooriyan

=== Special awards ===
Lifetime Achievement Award	Ravi

=== Listeners' Choice awards ===
Listeners' Choice Song of the Year	"Sheila Ki Jawani" - Tees Maar Khan
Listeners' Choice Album of the Year	Once Upon a Time in Mumbaai

=== Jury awards ===
Outstanding Contribution to Hindi Film Music	Charanjit Singh
Best Album of Golden Era)	Barsaat

=== Films with multiple wins and nominations ===
Films that received multiple nominations
Nominations	Film
13	Dabangg
12	My Name Is Khan
6	Guzaarish
6	Ishqiya
5	Once Upon a Time in Mumbaai
5	Peepli Live
5	Raajneeti
4	Raavan
3	Karthik Calling Karthik
3	Tees Maar Khan
2	Aashayein
2	Housefull
2	Lamhaa
2	Mirch

Films that received multiple awards
Wins	Film
8	Dabangg
2	Ishqiya
2	My Name Is Khan

== Jury ==
The jury was chaired by Javed Akhtar. Other members were:

- Aadesh Shrivastava - music composer and singer
- Alka Yagnik - playback singer
- Anu Malik - music director
- Lalit Pandit - composer
- Kailash Kher - singer
- Kavita Krishnamurthy - playback singer
- Louis Banks - composer, record producer and singer
- Prasoon Joshi - lyricist and screenwriter
- Rakeysh Omprakash Mehra - filmmaker and screenwriter
- Ramesh Sippy - director and producer
- Sadhana Sargam - playback singer
- Shankar Mahadevan - composer and playback singer
- Subhash Ghai - director, producer and screenwriter
- Suresh Wadkar - playback singer

== See also ==
- Mirchi Music Awards
