= GiMA Award for Best Film Album =

The GiMA Best Film Album is given by Global Indian Music Academy as a part of its annual Global Indian Music Academy Awards.

== List of winners ==
- 2010 3 Idiots – Shantanu Moitra
- 2011 Dabangg – Sajid–Wajid, Lalit Pandit
  - Anjaana Anjaani – Vishal–Shekhar
  - Band Baaja Baaraat – Salim–Sulaiman
  - Once Upon A Time In Mumbaai – Pritam Chakraborty
  - Raajneeti – Pritam, Aadesh Shrivastava, Shantanu Moitra, Wayne Sharpe
  - Tees Maar Khan – Vishal–Shekhar
- 2012 Rockstar – A. R. Rahman
  - Delhi Belly – Ram Sampath
  - Ra.One – Vishal–Shekhar
  - The Dirty Picture – Vishal–Shekhar
  - Zindagi Na Milegi Dobara – Shankar–Ehsaan–Loy
- 2013 – (no award given)
- 2014 Aashiqui 2 – Mithoon, Ankit Tiwari, Jeet Gannguli
  - Bhaag Milkha Bhaag – Shankar–Ehsaan–Loy
  - Raanjhanaa – A. R. Rahman
  - Goliyon Ki Raasleela Ram-Leela – Sanjay Leela Bhansali
  - Yeh Jawaani Hai Deewani – Pritam Chakraborty
- 2015 Highway – A. R. Rahman
  - 2 States – Shankar–Ehsaan–Loy
  - Bang Bang! – Vishal–Shekhar
  - CityLights – Jeet Gannguli
  - Haider – Vishal Bhardwaj
  - Humpty Sharma Ki Dulhania – Sachin–Jigar, Sharib-Toshi
- 2016 Roy – Amaal Mallik, Ankit Tiwari, Meet Bros Anjjan
  - Tamasha – A. R. Rahman
  - Dilwale – Pritam Chakraborty
  - Bajrangi Bhaijaan – Pritam Chakraborty
  - Bajirao Mastani – Sanjay Leela Bhansali

== See also ==
- Bollywood
- Cinema of India
