= GiMA Award for Best Lyricist =

The GiMA Best Lyricist is given by Global Indian Music Academy as a part of its annual Global Indian Music Academy Awards.

== Superlatives ==
Superlative	Singer	Record
Most awards	Swanand Kirkire; Irshad Kamil	2
Most nominations	Amitabh Bhattacharya	6
Most nominations without ever winning	Amitabh Bhattacharya	5
Most nominations in a single year	Javed Akhtar (2012); Amitabh Bhattacharya (2012); Prasoon Joshi (2012); Gulzar (2015)	2

== List of winners ==
- 2010 Swanand Kirkire for "Behti Hawa Sa Tha Woh" – 3 Idiots
- 2011 Irshad Kamil for "Pee Loon" – Once Upon A Time In Mumbaai
  - Amitabh Bhattacharya for "Ainvayi Ainvayi" – Band Baaja Baaraat
  - Faaiz Anwaar for "Tere Mast Mast Do Nain" – Dabangg
  - Gulzar for "Darling" – 7 Khoon Maaf
  - Kumaar, Vishal Dadlani for "Tujhe Bhula Diya" – Anjaana Anjaani
- 2012 Irshad Kamil for "Nadaan Parindey" – Rockstar
  - Amitabh Bhattacharya for "Abhi Mujh Mein Kahin" – Agneepath
  - Javed Akhtar for "Khwabon Ke Parindey" – Zindagi Na Milegi Dobara
  - Javed Akhtar for "Señorita" – Zindagi Na Milegi Dobara
  - Prasoon Joshi for "Kaun Si Dor" – Aarakshan
- 2013 – (no award given)
- 2014 Swanand Kirkire for "Manja" – Kai Po Che!
  - Amitabh Bhattacharya for "Kanira" – Yeh Jawaani Hai Deewani
  - Amitabh Bhattacharya for "Sawaar Loon" – Lootera
  - Prasoon Joshi for "Zinda" – Bhaag Milkha Bhaag
  - Prasoon Joshi for "Bhaag Milkha Bhaag" – Bhaag Milkha Bhaag
- 2015 Gulzar for "Bismil" – Haider
  - Amitabh Bhattacharya for "Mast Magan" – 2 States
  - Gulzar for "Bismil" – Haider
  - Gulzar for "Dil Ka Mizaaj" – Dedh Ishqiya
  - Manoj Muntashir for "Galliyan" – Ek Villain
  - Swanand Kirkire for "Chaar Kadam" – PK
- 2016 Varun Grover for "Moh Moh Ke Dhaage" - Dum Laga Ke Haisha
  - Gulzar for "Zinda" – Talvar
  - Amitabh Bhattacharya for "Gerua" – Dilwale
  - Irshad Kamil for "Agar Tum Saath Ho" – Tamasha
  - Kausar Munir for "Tu Jo Mila" – Bajrangi Bhaijaan
  - Kumaar for "Sooraj Dooba Hain" – Roy

== See also ==
- Bollywood
- Cinema of India
