= Komal Nahta =

Indian film critic, film trade analyst

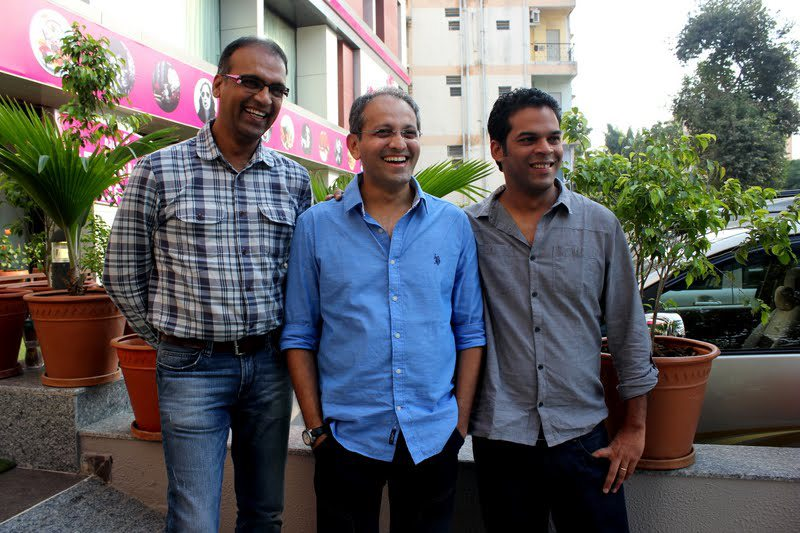
- Komal Nahta (left)
- Born: 30 April 1964 (age 62)
- Occupations: Film critic, TV host, trade analyst
- Years active: 1980–present
- Relatives: Taran Adarsh (cousin)

YouTube information
- Channel: Komal Nahta Official
- Subscribers: 442 thousand
- Views: 47 million
- Last updated: 14 March 2025
- Website: filminformation.com

Komal Nahta (born 30 April 1964) is an Indian film trade analyst. Nahta is the publisher of "Film Information" and also a television show host. He is an anchor of the trade show ETC Bollywood Business on the Bollywood TV channels ETC and Zee Cinema. He is in the advisory board of Cinema Capital. He is the son of film producer and critic Ramraj Nahta.

== Career ==
His interviews are carried by CNBC, STAR, Zee, B4U, NDTV, Zoom, and Doordarshan. In May 2007, Shah Rukh Khan and Karan Johar officially launched his weekly film magazine, The Film Street Journal. He runs a YouTube channel, 'Komal Nahata official' on which he gives film reviews.
