= GiMA Award for Best Engineer – Theatre Mix =

The GiMA Best Engineer – Theatre Mix is given by Global Indian Music Academy as a part of its annual Global Indian Music Academy Awards. The category being introduced in 2010, has not been awarded since 2012.

== List of winners ==
- 2010: Bishwadeep Chatterjee and Anup Dev – 3 Idiots
- 2011: Leslie Fernandes – Dabangg
  - Alok De – Udaan
  - Ajay Kumar – Patiala House
  - Leslie Fernandes – Housefull
  - Anuj Mathur – Band Baaja Baaraat

== See also ==
- Bollywood
- Cinema of India
