= Munni Badnaam Hui =

2010 song by Mamta Sharma and Aishwarya Nigam

Song by Mamta Sharma and Aishwarya Nigam

from the album Dabangg
- Language: Hindi
- Released: 20 August 2010
- Recorded: 2010
- Genre: pop-folk; filmi
- Length: 5:07
- Label: T-Series
- Composer: Lalit Pandit
- Producers: Arbaaz Khan; Malaika Arora Khan; Dhillin Mehta
External videos
- "Munni badnaam Hui" on YouTube

"Munni Badnaam Hui" (lit. 'Munni is defamed') is a song from the soundtrack album of the 2010 Hindi film Dabangg, featuring Malaika Arora, Sonu Sood and Salman Khan. The song is sung by Mamta Sharma and Aishwarya Nigam, with music by Lalit Pandit. Mamta Sharma won the Filmfare Award for Best Female Playback Singer for this song, while Sajid-Wajid and Lalit Pandit won the Filmfare Award for Best Music Director in the 56th Filmfare Awards 2011.

Due to its popularity, Malaika and the song itself were frequently compared to actress Katrina Kaif and her item number "Sheila Ki Jawani" from the film Tees Maar Khan (2010).

== Influence ==
The track is said to be inspired by an old Bhojpuri folk song "Launda Badnaam Hua Naseeban Tere Liye". It was also alleged that it was inspired from the Pakistani song "Ladka Badnaam Hua", from the film Mr. Charlie (1992). Director Abhinav Kashyap denied the latter and accepted using the folk song saying that he, being from Uttar Pradesh, was familiar with the song since childhood, so he suggested the very song to be improvised and rephrased to fit the film's requirement.

== Reception ==
The reception by the public and critics was generally positive. Devesh Sharma of Filmfare noted the song's raunchy nature and praised it for its tempo, at the same time criticizing its "nonsensical" lyrics. Atta Khan of Planet Bollywood said "... expect it to explode with Mallaika's entrance on the big screen and chances are, after watching that you may enjoy it..."

"Munni Badnaam Hui" was referred to in many political situations, to varying effects. In October 2010, the Chief Minister of Gujarat Narendra Modi played a pun on the song to criticize his opposition party, the Indian National Congress. It was one of many other popular terms used to criticize the 2010 Commonwealth Games and its organization.

=== Munni vs. Sheila ===
After the song "Sheila Ki Jawani" featuring Katrina Kaif was released, parallels were drawn between Katrina and Malaika, as well as between the item numbers, in what was popularly known as the "Munni vs Sheila" debate. Subsequently, news outlets reported increased rivalry between the two actors, which was supposedly highlighted by various incidents. The two were invited to perform their respective numbers at parties and other occasions, adding to the rivalry.

== Controversies ==
=== Lawsuit by Emami ===
The popular product by Emami, a pain relieving balm called Zandu Balm, is referred to at various times in the song. Emami filed a lawsuit against Arbaaz Khan, the producer of the movie for trademark misuse, but subsequently reached an out of court settlement with the producer. Emami then utilized the popularity of the song to advertise the Zandu Balm brand by signing up Malaika to do commercials.

=== Public Interest Litigations seeking ban ===
In December 2010, a Public Interest Litigation (PIL) was filed in the Lucknow bench of the Allahabad High Court, with the petitioner asking for a ban of the song, claiming it was "indecent" and "immoral". Another person also filed a lawsuit in a Sessions court in Mumbai objecting to the use of the word "Hindustan" in the lyrics of the song. The film got a U/A rating from the Censor board of India and was released without any cuts in the song, but the word "Hindustan" in the song was changed to "Policeistan" to avoid any further controversy.

== Accolades ==
| Award | Category | Recipient(s) and nominee(s) | Result | Ref. |
|---|---|---|---|---|
| 3rd Mirchi Music Awards | Song of The Year | - | Won | |
| 3rd Mirchi Music Awards | Female Vocalist of The Year | Mamta Sharma and Aishwarya | Won | |
| 3rd Mirchi Music Awards | Music Composer of The Year | Lalit Pandit | Nominated | |
| 3rd Mirchi Music Awards | Upcoming Female Vocalist of The Year | Mamta Sharma | Won | |
| 3rd Mirchi Music Awards | Best Item Song of the Year | - | Won | |
| 3rd Mirchi Music Awards | Best Song Recording | Abani Tanti | Nominated | |

== Sequel ==
In the soundtrack album of the sequel Dabangg 2, "Munni Badnaam Hui" has a sequel titled "Pandeyjee Seeti Mare" featuring Malaika Arora with Sonakshi Sinha.

For the soundtrack of the film Dabangg 3, Sajid-Wajid recreated the song, titled "Munna Badnaam Hua", which featured Warina Hussain and Salman Khan in the music video. The song included a rap segment by Badshah and was sung by Mamta Sharma and Kamaal Khan.
