= Mamta Sharma =

Indian playback singer (born 1980)

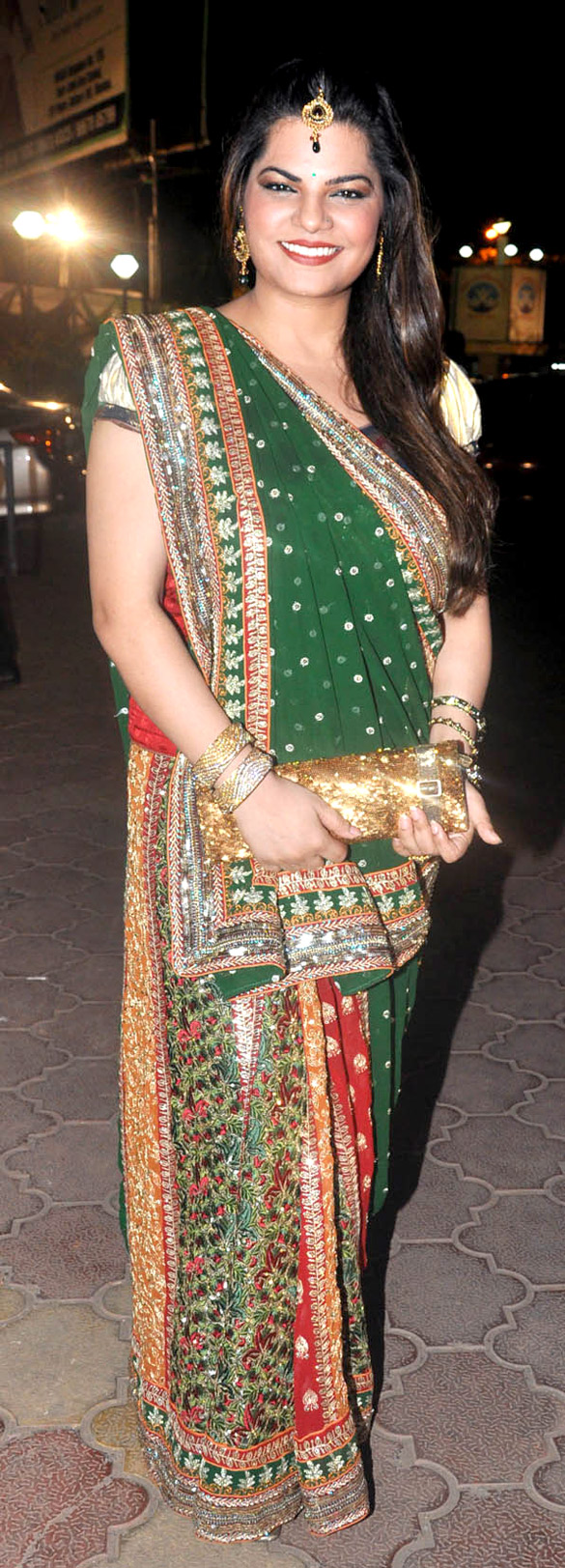

Background information
- Born: 7 September 1980 (age 45)
- Origin: Gwalior, Madhya Pradesh,
- Genres: Filmi, pop-folk, Indian pop
- Occupation: Singer
- Instrument: Vocals
- Years active: 2000–present (as singer); 2010–present (as playback singer)
- Spouse: Ashraf Ali

Mamta Sharma is an Indian playback singer. She is known for the song "Munni Badnaam Hui" from Dabangg and "Tinku Jiya" from Yamla Pagla Deewana. The songs were chartbusters and fetched her several awards and nominations, including a Filmfare award for Best Playback Singer (Female).

== Early life ==
Sharma was born in Birla Nagar, Gwalior, Madhya Pradesh. She completed her studies from Saint Paul's School Morar Gwalior. In school, she actively performed on stage. Later she also performed at various family events (marriage receptions, parties) with her band.

== Career ==
Before singing for Bollywood, Bengali, she lent her voice to many Bhojpuri albums She was spotted by music director Lalit Pandit who got her first break in super hit movie, Dabangg, with the item song, Munni Badnaam Hui. She also has sung the super hit song Kevvu Keka in the Telugu remake of Dabangg, Gabbar Singh. She later gave hit songs like 'Fevicol Se' & 'Tooh'.

Sharma, alongside Dinesh Agrahari Deewana and Indu Sonali, created Jaan Marbu Ka, a Bhojpuri music album presented under the banner of Jhinka Film Production.

== Accolades ==
Wins

- 17th Annual Star Screen Awards, 2011 – Karbonn Mobiles Best New Talent in Music Best Playback Singer (Female)
- 6th Apsara Film Producers Guild Awards, 2011 – Best Playback Singer (Female)
- 56th Filmfare Awards, 2011 – Best Playback Singer (Female)
- 12th IIFA Awards, Toronto, 2011 – Best Playback singer (Female)
- Mirchi Music Awards, 2010 – Upcoming Female Vocalist of The Year
- Mirchi Music Awards, 2010 – Female Vocalist of The Year
- Apsara Film & producers Guild Awards 2013– for most popular film song on Radio by 93.5 Red FM For "FEVICOL SE" from the Film "Dabangg 2".

Nominations

- 1st BIG Star Entertainment Awards, 2010 – Best Playback Singer (Female)
- Zee Cine Awards, 2011 – Best Playback Singer (Female)
- Stardust Awards, 2011 – New Music Sensation (Female)
- 2nd South Indian International Movie Awards, 2013 – Best Female Playback Singer for "Kevvu Keka" from Gabbar Singh
- 2nd South Indian International Movie Awards, 2013 – Best Female Playback Singer for "123 Mike Testing" from Yaare Koogadali

== See also ==
- List of Indian playback singers
