= Mirchi Music Award for Female Vocalist of the Year =

Hindi film music award

The Mirchi Music Award for Female Vocalist of The Year is given yearly by Radio Mirchi as a part of its annual Mirchi Music Awards for Hindi films, to recognise a female vocalist who has delivered an outstanding performance in a film song.

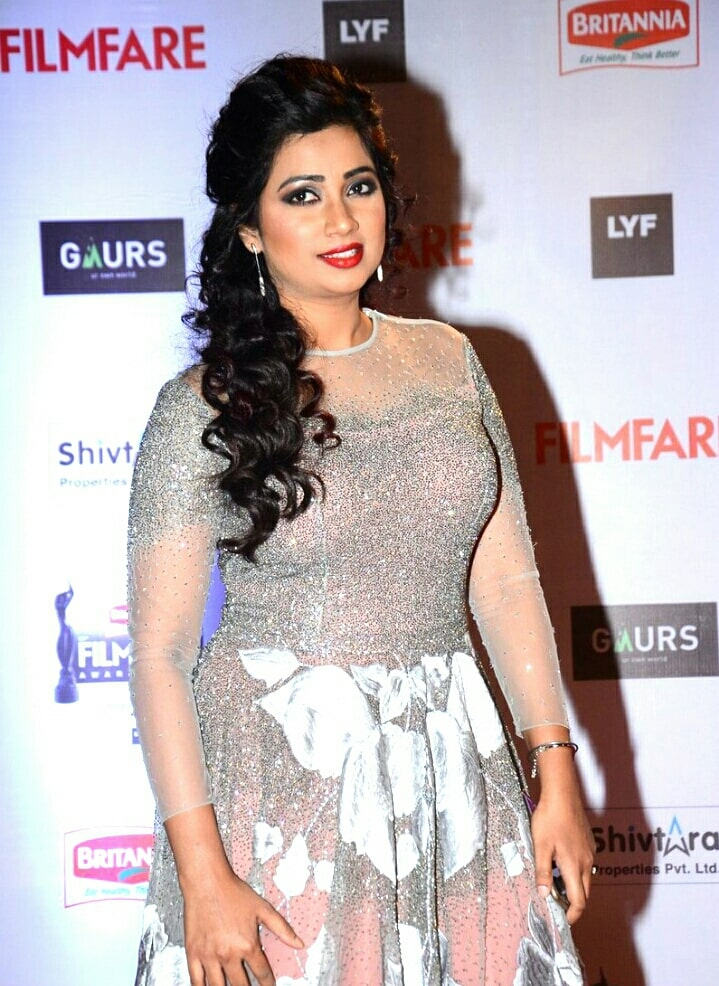
With eight wins, Shreya Ghoshal is the most-awarded recipient in this category. She was also awarded with the 'Female Vocalist of the Decade' award in 2020.

== Superlatives ==
Superlative	Singer	Record
Most awards	Shreya Ghoshal	8 (Including one for Female Vocalist of the Decade)
Most nominations	Shreya Ghoshal	24
Most nominations in a single year	Shreya Ghoshal	3 (2015, 2020 & 2021)
Most number of consecutive wins	Shreya Ghoshal	6 (2017 – 2022)

== List of winners ==
Table key
Indicates the winner of Female Vocalist of the Year Award
Indicates the winner of Female Vocalist of the Decade Award

Year	Singer	Song	Movie
2008
2008	Bela Shende	"Mann Mohana"	Jodhaa Akbar
2008	Anmol Malik	"Talli Ho Gayi"	Ugly Aur Pagli
2008	Dominique Cerejo	"Ye Tumhari Meri Baatein"	Rock On!!
2008	Shreya Ghoshal	"Teri Ore"	Singh Is Kinng
2008	Shruti Pathak	"Mar Jawaan"	Fashion
2009
2009	Rekha Bhardwaj	"Genda Phool"	Delhi-6
2009	Alisha Chinai	"Tera Hone Laga Hoon"	Ajab Prem Ki Ghazab Kahani
2009	Kavita Seth	"Iktara"	Wake Up Sid
2009	Shreya Ghoshal	"Tere Naina"	Chandni Chowk To China
2009	Shruti Pathak	"Rasiya"	Kurbaan
2010
2010	Mamta Sharma	"Munni Badnaam Hui"	Dabangg
2010	Richa Sharma	"Sajda"	My Name is Khan
2010	Shreya Ghoshal	"Chori Kiya Re Jiya"	Dabangg
2010	Sunidhi Chauhan	"Sheila Ki Jawani"	Tees Maar Khan
2010	Sunidhi Chauhan	"Udi"	Guzaarish
2011
2011	Sunidhi Chauhan	"Ishq Sufiyana"	The Dirty Picture
2011	Harshdeep Kaur & Sapna Awasthi	"Katiya Karun"	Rockstar
2011	Neha Bhasin	"Dhunki"	Mere Brother Ki Dulhan
2011	Rekha Bhardwaj & Usha Uthup	"Darling"	7 Khoon Maaf
2011	Shreya Ghoshal	"Ooh La La"	The Dirty Picture
2012
2012	Shreya Ghoshal	"Chikni Chameli"	Agneepath
2012	Kavita Seth	"Tum Hi Ho Bandhu"	Cocktail
2012	Shalmali Kholgade	"Pareshaan"	Ishaqzaade
2012	Shreya Ghoshal	"Saans"	Jab Tak Hai Jaan
2012	Sunidhi Chauhan	"Gun Gun Guna"	Agneepath
2013
2013	Chinmayi Sripada	"Titli"	Chennai Express
2013	Monali Thakur	"Sawaar Loon"	Lootera
2013	Palak Muchhal	"Chahun Main Ya Naa"	Aashiqui 2
2013	Shreya Ghoshal	"Sunn Raha Hai"	Aashiqui 2
2013	Sona Mohapatra	"Ambarsariya"	Fukrey
2014
2014	Jyoti Nooran & Sultana Nooran	"Patakha Guddi"	Highway
2014	Chinmayi Sripada	"Zehnaseeb"	Hasee Toh Phasee
2014	Kanika Kapoor	"Baby Doll"	Ragini MMS 2
2014	Shreya Ghoshal	"Samjhawan"	Humpty Sharma Ki Dulhania
2014	Shreya Ghoshal	"Manwa Laage"	Happy New Year
2015
2015	Shreya Ghoshal	"Mohe Rang Do Laal"	Bajirao Mastani
2015	Alka Yagnik	"Agar Tum Saath Ho"	Tamasha
2015	Monali Thakur	"Moh Moh Ke Dhaage"	Dum Laga Ke Haisha
2015	Shreya Ghoshal	"Deewani Mastani"	Bajirao Mastani
2015	Shreya Ghoshal & Vaishali Mhade	"Pinga"	Bajirao Mastani
2015	Swati Sharma	"Banno"	Tanu Weds Manu Returns
2016
2016	Jonita Gandhi	"Gilheriyan"	Dangal
2016	Jonita Gandhi	"The Breakup Song"	Ae Dil Hai Mushkil
2016	Shilpa Rao	"Bulleya"	Ae Dil Hai Mushkil
2016	Neha Bhasin	"Jag Ghoomeya"	Sultan
2016	Qurat-ul-Ain Balouch	"Kaari Kaari"	Pink
2017
2017	Shreya Ghoshal	"Thodi Der"	Half Girlfriend
2017	Madhushree	"Soja Zara"	Baahubali 2: The Conclusion
2017	Monali Thakur & Neha Kakkar	"Badri Ki Dulhania"	Badrinath Ki Dulhania
2017	Nikhita Gandhi	"Ghar"	Jab Harry Met Sejal
2017	Samira Koppikar	"Bairaagi"	Bareilly Ki Barfi
2018
2018	Shreya Ghoshal	"Ghoomar"	Padmaavat
2018	Shreya Ghoshal	"Dhadak"	Dhadak
2018	Neeti Mohan	"Naino Wale Ne"	Padmaavat
2018	Harshdeep Kaur	"Dilbaro"	Raazi
2018	Sunidhi Chauhan	"Ae Watan"	Raazi
2019
2019	Shreya Ghoshal	"Ghar More Pardesiya"	Kalank
2019	Neha Bhasin	"Chashni" (Reprise)	Bharat
2019	Parampara Thakur	"Mere Sohneya"	Kabir Singh
2019	Shreya Ghoshal	"Tabaah Ho Gaye"	Kalank
2019	Shilpa Rao	"Ghungroo"	War
Female Vocalist of the Decade
2020
2020	Shreya Ghoshal	"Mohe Rang Do Laal"	Bajirao Mastani
2020	Shreya Ghoshal	"Ghar More Pardesiya"	Kalank
2020	Shreya Ghoshal	"Ghoomar"	Padmaavat
2020	Jyoti Nooran & Sultana Nooran	"Patakha Guddi"	Highway
2020	Chinmayi Sripada	"Titli"	Chennai Express
2021
2021	Shreya Ghoshal	"Chaka Chak"	Atrangi Re
2021	Shreya Ghoshal	"Tere Rang"	Atrangi Re
2021	Shreya Ghoshal	"Param Sundari"	Mimi
2021	Sunidhi Chauhan	"Saami Saami"	Pushpa: The Rise
2021	Asees Kaur	"Raataan Lambiyan"	Shershah
2022			
2022	Shreya Ghoshal	"Jab Saiyaan"	Gangubai Kathiawadi
2022	Neeti Mohan	"Meri Jaan"	Gangubai Kathiawadi
2022	Jahnvi Shrimankar	"Dholida"	Gangubai Kathiawadi
2022	Sireesha Bhagavatula	"Phero Na Najariya"	Qala
2022	Yohani	"Manike"	Thank God
2023
2023	Shilpa Rao	"Besharam Rang"	Pathaan
2023	Shreya Ghoshal	"Tum Kya Mile"	Rocky Aur Rani Kii Prem Kahaani
2023	Jonita Gandhi	"What Jhumka?"	Rocky Aur Rani Kii Prem Kahaani
2023	Vasundhara Vee	"Besuri Main"	Ved
2023	Shilpa Rao	"Chaleya"	Jawan

== See also ==
- Mirchi Music Awards
- Bollywood
- Cinema of India
