= GiMA Award for Best Music Director =

Global Indian Music Academy award

The GiMA Best Music Director is given by Global Indian Music Academy as a part of its annual Global Indian Music Academy Awards.

== List of winners ==
- 2010 Vishal Bhardwaj – Kaminey
- 2011 Sajid–Wajid, Lalit Pandit – Dabangg
  - Pritam – Once Upon A Time In Mumbaai
  - Salim–Sulaiman – Band Baaja Baaraat
  - Sanjay Leela Bhansali – Guzaarish
  - Vishal–Shekhar – Anjaana Anjaani
  - Wayne Sharpe, Shantanu Moitra, Aadesh Shrivastava, Pritam – Raajneeti
- 2012 A.R. Rahman – Rockstar
  - Ajay–Atul – Agneepath
  - Ram Sampath – Delhi Belly
  - Shankar–Ehsaan–Loy – Zindagi Na Milegi Dobara
  - Vishal–Shekhar – Ra.One
- 2013 – (no award given)
- 2014 Pritam – Yeh Jawaani Hai Deewani
  - Ankit Tiwari, Jeet Gannguli and Mithoon – Aashiqui 2
  - Amit Trivedi – Lootera
  - Shankar–Ehsaan–Loy – Bhaag Milkha Bhaag
  - Sanjay Leela Bhansali – Goliyon Ki Raasleela Ram-Leela
- 2015 Amit Trivedi – Queen
  - A. R. Rahman – Highway
  - Ankit Tiwari, Mithoon, Soch – Ek Villain
  - Sachin–Jigar, Sharib–Toshi – Humpty Sharma Ki Dulhania
  - Shankar–Ehsaan–Loy – 2 States
  - Vishal–Shekhar – Bang Bang!
- 2016 Sanjay Leela Bhansali – Bajirao Mastani
  - Pritam – Bajrangi Bhaijaan
  - A. R. Rahman – Tamasha
  - Amaal Mallik, Ankit Tiwari, Meet Bros Anjjan – Roy
  - Pritam – Dilwale
  - Shankar–Ehsaan–Loy – Dil Dhadakne Do

== See also ==
- Bollywood
- Cinema of India
