= Tere Mast Mast Do Nain =

Song from the film Dabangg

Song by Sajid–Wajid (composer) and Rahat Fateh Ali Khan and Shreya Ghoshal (performer)

from the album Dabangg
- Language: Hindi
- Released: 20 August 2010
- Recorded: 2010
- Genre: Feature film soundtrack, Qawwali
- Length: 6:00
- Label: T-Series
- Composer: Sajid–Wajid
- Lyricist: Faiz Anwar

"Tere Mast Mast Do Nain" is a song from the Hindi film Dabangg starring Salman Khan and Sonakshi Sinha, directed by Abhinav Kashyap. The song was released as a part of the film's soundtrack album on 20 August 2010. The music was composed by Sajid–Wajid and sung by Rahat Fateh Ali Khan and Shreya Ghoshal. The choreography is by Mahesh Limaye. The song is set in a busy marketplace. Chulbul Pandey (Salman Khan) is trying to impress Rajo (Sonakshi Sinha). The Tere Mast Mast Do Nain song starts when Chulbul Pandey finds that he is in love with Raj.

== Awards and nominations ==
- Winner BIG Star Entertainment Awards Best Singer (2010) – Rahat Fateh Ali Khan
- Winner Mirchi Music Award for Male Vocalist of The Year (2010) – Rahat Fateh Ali Khan
- Winner Mirchi Music Award for Music Composer of The Year (2010) – Sajid–Wajid
- Nominated Mirchi Music Award for Song of The Year (2010)
- Nominated Mirchi Music Award for Lyricist of The Year (2010) – Faiz Anwar
- Winner 2011 IIFA Awards Best Male Vocalist (2011)
- Winner Apsara Award for Best Playback Singer (2011)

== Sequel ==
In the movie Dabangg 2 (2012), this song has a sequel entitled "Dagabaaz Re".

In the film Jai Ho (2014), another similar song entitled "Tere Naina Maar Hi Daalenge" also composed by Sajid–Wajid and sung by Shaan and Shreya Ghoshal was picturised on Salman Khan and Daisy Shah.
