= Stardust Award for New Musical Sensation – Female =

Film award in India

The Stardust New Music Sensational is chosen by the readers of the annual Stardust magazine. The award honours a star that has made an impact with their acting in that certain film.

Here is a list of the award winners and the films for which they won.

Year	Singer	Song	Film
2003	Shreya Ghoshal	Bairi Piya	Devdas
2004	Sowmya Raoh	Laila Laila	Samay: When Time Strikes
2005
2006
2007
2008	Anushka Manchanda	Aye Chori	Cash
2009	Anmol Malik	Talli Ho Gayi	Ugly Aur Pagli
2010	Kavita Seth	Iktara	Wake Up Sid
2011	Vibhavari Joshi	Saiba	Guzaarish

== See also ==
- Stardust Awards
- Bollywood
- Cinema of India
