= Tees Maar Khan (2010 film) =

2010 Indian film by Farah Khan

- Theatrical release poster
- Directed by: Farah Khan
- Written by: Shirish Kunder; Ashmith Kunder
- Story by: Adapted story: Shirish Kunder; Original story: Neil Simon; Cesare Zavattini
- Based on: After the Fox by Vittorio de Sica
- Produced by: Twinkle Khanna; Shirish Kunder; Ronnie Screwvala
- Starring: Akshay Kumar; Akshaye Khanna; Katrina Kaif
- Narrated by: Sanjay Dutt
- Cinematography: P. S. Vinod
- Edited by: Shirish Kunder
- Music by: Title Song and Background Score: Shirish Kunder; Original soundtrack: Vishal–Shekhar
- Production companies: UTV Motion Pictures; Hari Om Entertainment; Three's Company Productions
- Distributed by: UTV Motion Pictures
- Release date: 24 December 2010
- Running time: 131 minutes
- Country: India
- Language: Hindi
- Budget: ₹45 crore
- Box office: est. ₹101.89 crore

Tees Maar Khan (transl. One who has killed thirty) is a 2010 Indian Hindi-language heist comedy film directed by Farah Khan and produced by Twinkle Khanna, editor Shirish Kunder and Ronnie Screwvala under UTV Motion Pictures, Hari Om Entertainment, and Three's Company. A remake of the 1966 Italian film After the Fox, whose story was adapted by Shirish and scripted by him and his brother Ashmith Kunder, the film stars Akshay Kumar, Akshaye Khanna, and Katrina Kaif in lead roles. Salman Khan and Anil Kapoor make special appearances.

Tees Maar Khan was released worldwide on 24 December 2010, on Christmas Eve. The film was a moderate commercial success at the box office, and is today primarily remembered for Kaif's dance number "Sheila Ki Jawani" and Akshaye Khanna's portrayal of superstar Aatish Kapoor, who works with Kumar's Oscar winning director persona. The theatrical trailer and title song of the film were released on UTV Motion Pictures' YouTube channel on 4 August 2010 for promotional purposes. The trailer premiered in theatres with Vipul Amrutlal Shah's romantic comedy Action Replayy, also starring Kumar, and Rohit Shetty's action comedy Golmaal 3 on 5 November 2010. Featuring music composed by Vishal-Shekhar, with Shirish composing the background score and the title track while also writing it, the film was Khan's only film till date to neither be written by her nor feature her frequent collaborator Shah Rukh Khan.

Despite having received negative reviews upon release, Tees Maar Khan has achieved cult status as a classic parody film. The film is also noted for being the only screen collaboration between Kumar and Akshaye Khanna.

== Plot ==
The Indian Police Force has successfully busted an operation to smuggle ₹500 crores worth of national treasure. The Interpol suspects that the Johri Brothers, a pair of infamous Siamese twins, are behind this. Due to the possibility that they will try to steal the treasure again, Commissioner Khadak Singh is assigned the task of securing the train that will transport these ancient artefacts, with no stops, back to the treasury in Delhi. Singh suspects that the Johri Brothers will hire Tabrez Mirza Khan, a.k.a. Tees Maar Khan, a cunning conman, to steal the artefacts from the moving train.

Meanwhile, in Paris, Tabrez is arrested by a secret agent from Interpol. CBI Officers Chatterjee and Mukherjee are tasked with the responsibility of bringing Tabrez back to India via air. However, Tabrez tricks the people on the plane and slyly escapes on landing. As expected, he is soon hired by the Johri Brothers, who are desperate to retrieve the antiques.

To perform this feat, Tabrez steals some shooting equipment from a low-budget film and stumbles across Dhulia, a poor, small village that resides by the railway track over which the antiques will be transported. He pretends to be Manoj "Day" Ramalin, a film director and brother of Manoj "Night" Ramalin. Using this identity, he approaches Aatish Kapoor, a superstar who is desperate to win an Oscar Award, to be a part of the film he is shooting to gain an edge over the police and control the villagers. After Tabrez narrates an "Oscar-winning" period drama based on India's freedom struggle, Aatish promptly agrees to be a part of the film.

As Tabrez gears up for the heist, the Johri Brothers inform him that the train is delayed by a week due to security reasons. As a result, he is forced to shoot the film titled "Bharat Ka Khazana," meaning "India's Treasure," that he never intended to. During the shooting process, he ends up bonding with the villagers and also manages to, unintentionally, awaken the method actor within Aatish.

Finally, the big day arrives, and Tabrez briefs the villagers that the scene to be shot is that of Indians looting a British train secured by British officers who are stealing India's treasures and eventually taking them back to Britain. He directs them to stop and loot the train, and load all the loot into three trucks. Aatish, completely lost in his character as a freedom fighter, stands on the railway tracks holding the flag of India's freedom fighters. On noticing the superstar and hundreds of villagers, Singh is forced to stop the train.

After the trucks are loaded and the train is completely emptied, the Johri Brothers double-cross Tabrez and run away with his share of the loot as well, leaving him to be arrested by Singh. The court sentences Tabrez to 60 years in prison; he asks his sidekicks to complete the film and release it.

At the film's premiere, Tabrez is brought under heavy police protection straight from prison. Critics tout the incoherent, disjointed film as French cinema that's sure to win an Oscar. However, once the curtains drop and the lights return, Tabrez is nowhere to be seen, having escaped during the screening. He hijacks the Johri Brothers' plane that contains the loot and throws them out, thereby getting even with them. Aatish wins the Best Actor award for Bharat Ka Khazana at the Oscars, thus completing his dream. Dhulia is now prosperous due to the fame and tourists that it gets due to Bharat Ka Khazana.

The film ends with different members who helped make the film getting 'prizes', and Chatterjee and Mukherjee getting married.

== Cast ==
- Akshay Kumar as Tabrez Mirza Khan a.k.a. Tees Maar Khan a.k.a. TMK / Manoj "Day" Ramalin (a play on the director M. Night Shyamalan's name)
- Akshaye Khanna as Aatish Kapoor, a talented but greedy superstar who aspires for an Oscar award
- Katrina Kaif as Aanya Khan, Tabrez's girlfriend and a struggling actress
- Aarya Babbar as Inspector Dhurinder
- Raghu Ram and Rajiv Laxman as the Johri Brothers, a pair of Siamese twins and international criminals wanted by the Interpol
- Vijay Maurya as Soda, Tabrez's sidekick
- Dharampal as Dollar, Tabrez's sidekick
- Ali Asgar as Burger, Tabrez's sidekick
- Aman Verma as CBI officer Chatterjee
- Murali Sharma as CBI officer Mukherjee
- Sudhir Pandey as Bunty Baweja, Aatish's manager
- Apara Mehta as Tabrez's mother
- Anjan Srivastav as Nana Ganphule, the village chief of Dhulia
- Avtar Gill as Subedaar
- Shashi Kiran as Santram, the local Munshi
- Sachin Khedekar as Commissioner Khadak Singh
- Vijay Patkar as Inspector Jagtap
- Shashank Vyas as a villager
- Mia Uyeda in a special appearance as Malavika Shukla, aviation minister Pankaj Shukla's daughter
- Anvita Dutt Guptan in a special appearance as a press reporter at the film screening
- Viju Khote as Judge
- Vishal Dadlani in a special appearance as the lascivious producer of "Sheila Ki Jawani"
- Manish Paul in a special appearance as Master India, the second alternative for the Johri brothers who was ruled out by Commissioner Singh
- Anil Kapoor in a special appearance in the song "Happy Ending"
- Bhushan Kumar and Krishan Kumar in a special appearance in the song "Happy Ending"
- Salman Khan in a special appearance as himself in the song "Wallah Re Wallah"
- Chunky Pandey in a special appearance as himself
- Komal Nahta in a special appearance as himself
- Ishtiyak Khan as Ishwar, a villager
- Shakti Mohan as dancer in the promotional music video of the title track

== Production ==
Priyanka Chopra was earlier rumoured to play the part of Aanya, but that rumour was later dropped after Katrina Kaif was chosen to play the female lead.

The script is penned by director Farah Khan's husband, Shirish Kunder. Sanjay Dutt was confirmed to play the role of the narrator for the film. Farah stated in an interview that she wanted someone with a voice which people can recognise even in their sleep.

An entire train was made and 500m track laid for Rs. 7.5 million to shoot the climax scenes.

== Soundtrack ==
The music of the film is composed by the music duo of Vishal–Shekhar and one song from debutant music composer Shirish Kunder for the title track. Lyrics are penned by Vishal Dadlani, Anvita Dutt Guptan and Shirish Kunder. The music was launched on 10 November 2010. The entire cast and crew travelled on a train booked from Mumbai to Lonavala for the music launch. Sonu Nigam has given 54 voices for the title track of the film. The song "Sheila Ki Jawani" became a chartbuster and fetched Sunidhi Chauhan a Filmfare Award and many other awards.

== Release ==
Tees Maar Khan premiered in the UK, Fiji and Canada on 22 December 2010.

A mobile video game based on the film was also launched by UTV Indiagames.

== Reception ==
=== Critical response ===
Anupama Chopra of NDTV wrote, "Tees Maar Khan, adapted from After the Fox, by writers Shrish and Ashmit Kunder, is disappointingly limp and insistently low on IQ. The film has little of the effervescence and flair of a typical Farah Khan film," giving it 2/5 stars. Aseem Chhabra of Rediff.com, who rated the film 1.5/5, stated, "Even at two hours, the film feels like one long and tedious exercise in bad humour. Some people laughed during the screening I attended in New York City. However, most sat with glum faces, in a sense of disbelief ..... How could a talented(..?) person like Khan make such an unfunny film?" Behindwoods review board gave the film a two out of five-star rating and quoted "So is Tees Maar Khan watchable? Good Question. Very good question. The answer is 'Yes' if you are in the mood to celebrate. But watch it in theatres as the fun is only when there is a crowd laughing along with you. The second half can have you in splits." Taran Adarsh of Bollywood Hungama gave a modest rating of 3/5 in his review and said, "Farah Khan's brand new outing Tees Maar Khan will make the most absurd, bizarre and wacky cinema of yore pale in comparison. Not just your cell phone, even your brain needs to be put on 'switched off' mode at the commencement of this film." Nikhat Kazmi of the Times of India awarded 2.5/5 stars while commenting, "Sadly, Tees Maar Khan begins as a spoof and remains a spoof, till the very end. All the characters end up as mere caricatures and completely fail to build up an emotional quotient in the film." Yahoo! Movies gave the film 1.5/5 stars. Komal Nahta of Koimoi.com gave it a rating of 2/5 and stated, "Too much of farcical comedy; lack of emotions; over-the-top characters; unbelievable script ..... Tees Maar Khan is definitely a disappointment, but it will bring back the invested money and a bit more." Aniruddha Guha of Daily News and Analysis gave the film 2 stars and remarked, "Even Sheila can’t make Tees Maar Khan watchable ... Though the story is interesting (Neil Simon of After The Fox should ideally get the credit), the writing is so pedestrian and Farah Khan’s presentation so lacklustre that you wonder how the film was greenlighted at all." Gaurav Malani of The Economic Times gave 2 stars saying, "To sum up in Tees Maar Khan's trademark style of dialogue delivery, Akshay Kumar se zara hatke comedy expect karna aur Akshaye Khanna se kuch bhi expect karna bekaar hain. Tees Maar Khan doesn’t even guarantee thirty good laughs in its three-hour runtime." Kaveree Bamzai of India Today rated it 2½/5 saying, "It's an oddly half-hearted film from a woman [Farah Khan] who is never known to do anything in half measure." Rajeev Masand of CNN-IBN rated the movie 2/5 suggesting, "If you’re outraged by such low-brow humour, 'Tees Maar Khan' is going to be a long, hard slog for you." Raja Sen of Rediff.com gave a 2 out of 5 star rating explaining that "Tees Maar Khan looks better, is better acted, and provides far more laughs than the standard Bollywood comic project, but judging Farah by the bar she's set for herself, it has to be termed a disappointment." The Hindu in its review said "So there are at least a dozen gags that will make you laugh but the point is from Farah, we expect a lot, qualitatively and quantitatively, more."

Following the critical and commercial failure of the film, director Farah Khan stated that the negative reception left her devastated, noting that she was unable to leave her bed for a week.

=== Box office ===
==== India ====
Tees Maar Khan took a 100% opening at most multiplexes across India. The film collected ₹130.6 million (US$1.4 million) on its first day of business, becoming the second biggest opening day grosser of all time across India for Hindi movies after Dabangg. On the second day of its release, the film netted ₹135 million (US$1.4 million), taking the two-day total to ₹265 million (US$2.8 million) nett. Tees Maar Khan collected about ₹380 million (US$3.9 million) nett at the end of its first weekend, thus becoming the second biggest opening weekend net grosser of all time across India for Hindi movies. Despite its initial huge run at the box office, there had been many negative reports about the film. Box Office India reported, "Tees Maar Khan has not matched the expectations from the film prior to release but it is not that bad either as it is not as if the film just collapsed. The opening weekend collections are around 15% lower than sensible expectations." Tees Maar Khan underwent a heavy 65% fall on Monday, its fourth day of business, as it collected ₹45 million (US$470,000). The film further suffered a big drop on Tuesday, its fifth day of business, collecting around ₹32.5 million (US$340,000) nett, taking the five-day business to ₹455 million (US$4.7 million) nett. Tees Maar Khan went on to collect ₹490.4 million (US$5.1 million) nett in its first week of release. The film showed an 85% decline in the second week, on its eight-day of business, as compared to its first day. In its second weekend, the film collected around ₹80 million (US$830,000) nett, taking the ten days collections to ₹565 million (US$5.9 million) nett. The film collected about ₹105 million (US$1.1 million) nett in second week, taking the total collections in two weeks to ₹595 million (US$6.2 million) nett. The film collected ₹12.5 million (US$130,000) nett in its third week, taking the total domestic collections ₹610 million (US$6.3 million) nett.

==== Overseas ====
In the overseas market, the film grossed around $2.5 million from its extended weekend, which, according to Box Office India, "is below par for a big film". The breakdown included £320,000 from United Kingdom in 5 days, $750,000 from North America in 5 days, $500,000 from United Arab Emirates in 3 days and $175,000 from Pakistan in 3 days. The nett collections till the end of the second weekend e were: £625,000 from United Kingdom, $1,030,000 from North America, $775,000 from UAE, and $265,000 from Australia.

== Awards and nominations ==
IIFA Awards

Nominated

- IIFA Best Female Playback – Sunidhi Chauhan for Sheila Ki Jawani

Zee Cine Awards

Won

- Zee Cine Award for Best Choreography – Farah Khan for "Sheila Ki Jawani"

Nominated

- Zee Cine Award for Best Track of the Year – "Sheila Ki Jawani"
- Zee Cine Award for Best Music Director – Vishal / Shekhar
- Zee Cine Award for Best Playback Singer – Male – Sonu Nigam for "Tees Maar Khan"
- Zee Cine Award for Best Playback Singer – Female – Sunidhi Chauhan for "Sheila Ki Jawani"
- Zee Cine Award for Best Lyricist – Vishal Dadlani for "Sheila Ki Jawani"
- Zee Cine Award for Best Actor in a Supporting Role – Male – Akshaye Khanna
- Zee Cine Award for Best Cinematography – P.S. Vinod

Filmfare Awards

Won

- Filmfare Best Playback Singer – Female – Sunidhi Chauhan for Sheila Ki Jawani
- Filmfare Best Choreography Award – Farah Khan for Sheila Ki Jawani

Star Screen Awards

Won

- Best Actress (Popular Choice) – Katrina Kaif

Nominated

- Screen Best Female Playback – Sunidhi Chauhan for Sheila Ki Jawani

Apsara Film & Television Producers Guild Awards

Won

- Best Female Playback Singer – Sunidhi Chauhan for Sheila Ki Jawani

Stardust Awards

Won

- Star of the Year – Male – Akshay Kumar

Mirchi Music Awards

Won

- Listeners' Choice Song of the Year for "Sheila Ki Jawani"

Nominated

- Song of The Year for "Sheila Ki Jawani"
- Female Vocalist of The Year – Sunidhi Chauhan for "Sheila Ki Jawani"
- Best Item Song of the Year for "Sheila Ki Jawani"

Other Awards

Won

- GIMA Award for Best Female Playback Singer – Sunidhi Chauhan for Sheila Ki Jawani
- Airtel Dancing Super Star for Sheila Ki Jawani – Katrina Kaif

== Sequel ==
Even before the film was released, Khan and Kunder had planned on converting the film into a franchise, and Kunder was reportedly writing a sequel, with Kumar again in the titular role. However, after his second collaboration with the couple, the comedy film Joker, was also poorly received and was dubbed a disaster, Kumar reportedly avoided further collaborations with Khan, and the sequel was shelved.
