= Sheila Ki Jawani =

Song by Sunidhi Chauhan, Vishal Dadlani
- Language: Hindi
- Released: 14 November 2010
- Genre: Filmi, Pop-folk
- Length: 4:43
- Label: T-Series
- Composer: Vishal–Shekhar
- Lyricist: Vishal Dadlani
- Producers: Twinkle Khanna; Shirish Kunder; Ronnie Screwvala

"Sheila Ki Jawani" (lit. 'Sheila's youth') is an Indian Hindi-language song sung by Sunidhi Chauhan and Vishal Dadlani, featuring Katrina Kaif along with Akshay Kumar in the 2010 Bollywood film Tees Maar Khan. The music was composed by composer duo Vishal–Shekhar and the lyrics were penned by Dadlani. The moves were choreographed by choreographer-director Farah Khan, who went on to win the Filmfare Award for Best Choreography for the film.

The popularity of the song prompted many comparisons with "Munni Badnaam Hui" from the 2010 film Dabangg. It has since become one of the most viewed Bollywood songs on YouTube with more than 305 million views to date.

== Influences ==
Katrina Kaif stated that Farah Khan presented her with DVDs of Madhuri Dixit's movies, so that Katrina could concentrate on Dixit's dances. Kaif then stated that it helped her a lot. Kaif describes her performance in this song as "one of the sexiest" she has ever done. She said, "It was kind of a learning experience for me. I don't take the song being called item number as an offense. There is exposure in the song but it is more about attitude and I was specific about it..." Director Farah Khan recalls, "Katrina was very conscious of revealing her navel in 'Sheila ki Jawani' and worked out for two months for it, telling me to allow her an option to cover herself with a dupatta if her abs weren't flat. But in the end, she was extremely confident, not bothering to cover up with a bathrobe in between shots or even in the walk from her vanity van to the set."

== Lyrics ==
The lyrics of the song are of a playful tone, with Anya, played by Kaif, teasing the men in the scene, singing "I know you want it, but you're never going to get it". Shah and Cory compared this to an adult version of the Fort-Da Game as observed by Freud, as viewers of the song are described by them as being able to "symbolically replace what they want (a real woman's body) and derive pleasure from it".

== Music video ==
In the music video for the song, Kaif appears in six different looks, each with its own respective set-up.

The music video is set in a film studio, and starts off displaying a sign labeled "Blue Films Presents Sheila ki Jawani". The camera then pans to the stage, where Anya, played by Kaif, is lying on a bed while draped in a pink bedsheet. A film crew and director are shown to be leering at Anya. Numerous men, clad in black, then appear, also going onto the bed, and then end up surrounding Anya. After the opening lyrics, Anya begins vigorously beating her chest as the men around her rock their pelvises back and forth.

The next scene shows Anya, now off the bed and standing, singing "I know you want it, but you're never going to get it" as she and her male backup dancers break into dance. The scene adopts the classic diamond-shape structure of many hip-hop videos, with a lead dancer, Anya and backup dancers together forming a diamond shape, with the lead in the front. Anya then holds a wide-legged pose, beating her torso side to side while her arms are extended straight out in front of her, and then beats her chest in a jiggle.

The final scene of the music video takes place in what Farah Khan describes as a "rustic bar setting". After being splashed by water, the scene transitions to Anya being "surrounded by men holding beer mugs". Khan states that both Anya being splashed with water and the backup dancers holding beer mugs were inspired by the song "Jumma Chumma De De" in Hum (1991).

Both the official music video and the full video feature Kaif shooting for an eponymous film with Dadlani as producer in a special appearance. Kumar and his gang, comprising Ali Asgar, Dharampal and Vijay Maurya, then interrupt the music video shoot twice, only to be dragged away by security.

The extended video cut ends with Kumar smashing producer Dadlani's head with a mug and carrying away Kaif on his shoulders as the background dancers scatter in a frenzy. Kumar is shown to detest the shoot and tries to distract Kaif, annoying Dadlani in the bargain.

== Reception ==
The song was well received by film critics, who praised the choreography of Farah Khan and the moves of Katrina. Anupama Chopra of NDTV wrote, "Farah continues to be the consummate choreographer – So, Sheila ki Jawani has a superb, infectious energy". Nikhat Kazmi of The Times of India wrote "Of course Sheila Ki Jawani is eye-popping chartbuster fare and adds another definition to the item number with Katrina's explosive rendition". India Today wrote "The stunning Katrina Kaif brings sexy back with her latest item song from Farah Khan's Tees Maar Khan." The Times of India, praising Katrina in item songs, wrote, "Katrina Kaif made men go weak on their knees with her navel exposure for the item songs, 'Sheila ki Jawani' and 'Chikni Chameli' which were major hits in her career."

The song turned out to be one of the biggest hits of the year, along with "Munni Badnaam Hui" from Dabangg. Malaika Arora, who featured in "Munni Badnaam Hui" was frequently compared with Kaif, in what was popularly known as the "Munni vs Sheila" debate.

== Controversy ==
In December 2010, a Public Interest Litigation (PIL) was filed in the Lucknow bench of the Allahabad High Court, with the petitioner asking for a ban of the song, claiming it was "indecent" and "immoral". However, the movie was released with minimal cuts, and was given a U/A censor rating.

== Accolades ==
Award	Category	Recipient(s) and nominee(s)	Result	Ref.
3rd Mirchi Music Awards	Song of The Year	-	Nominated	
3rd Mirchi Music Awards	Female Vocalist of The Year	Sunidhi Chauhan	Nominated	
3rd Mirchi Music Awards	Best Item Song of the Year	-	Nominated	
3rd Mirchi Music Awards	Listeners' Choice Song of the Year	-	Won	

== Awards and nominations ==
IIFA Awards

Nominated

- IIFA Best Female Playback - Sunidhi Chauhan for Sheila Ki Jawani

Zee Cine Awards

Won

- Zee Cine Award for Best Choreography Award - Farah Khan for "Sheila Ki Jawani"

Nominated

- Zee Cine Award for Best Track of the Year - "Sheila Ki Jawani"
- Zee Cine Award for Best Music Director - Vishal / Shekhar
- Zee Cine Award for Best Playback Singer - Female - Sunidhi Chauhan for "Sheila Ki Jawani"
- Zee Cine Award for Best Lyricist - Vishal Dadlani for "Sheila Ki Jawani"

Filmfare Awards

Won

- Filmfare Best Playback Singer - Female - Sunidhi Chauhan for Sheila Ki Jawani
- Filmfare Best Choreography Award - Farah Khan for Sheila Ki Jawani

Star Screen Awards

Nominated

- Screen Award for Best Female Playback for Sheila Ki Jawani (Sunidhi Chauhan)

Apsara Film & Television Producers Guild Awards

Won

- Best Female Playback Singer for - Sheila Ki Jawani - Sunidhi Chauhan

Mirchi Music Awards

Won

- Listeners' Choice Song of the Year for "Sheila Ki Jawani"

Nominated

- Song of The Year for "Sheila Ki Jawani"
- Female Vocalist of The Year - Sunidhi Chauhan for "Sheila Ki Jawani"
- Best Item Song of the Year for "Sheila Ki Jawani"

Other Awards

Won

- GIMA award Best Female playback for Sheila Ki Jawani - Sunidhi Chauhan
- Airtel Dancing Super Star for Sheila Ki Jawani - Katrina Kaif
