= Salman Khan filmography =

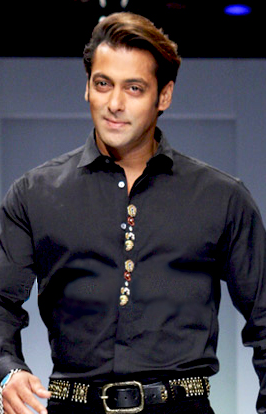
Salman Khan in 2009

Salman Khan is an Indian actor and producer, known for his work in Hindi films. He made his film debut with a brief role in Biwi Ho To Aisi (1988), before having his breakthrough with Sooraj Barjatya's blockbuster romance Maine Pyar Kiya (1989) that won him the Filmfare Award for Best Male Debut. In the early 1990s, he earned success with the action film Baaghi: A Rebel for Love (1990) and the romance Sanam Bewafa, Saajan (both 1991).

The success of the family drama Hum Aapke Hain Koun..! (1994) and the melodramatic action Karan Arjun (1995) revitalised Khan's career and established him in Bollywood. Also in 1994, he co-starred with Aamir Khan in the comedy movie Andaz Apna Apna, which was poorly received at that time, but later became a cult film in India. Among his three film releases of 1996 were Sanjay Leela Bhansali's critically acclaimed musical drama Khamoshi and the Raj Kanwar-directed drama Jeet. The following year, he played dual roles in David Dhawan's comedy Judwaa. In 1998, Khan featured in Sohail Khan's Pyaar Kiya To Darna Kya, and appeared briefly in the romantic drama Kuch Kuch Hota Hai, both of which ranked among the top-earning Bollywood productions of 1998. For the latter, he was awarded the Filmfare Award for Best Supporting Actor.

In 1999, Khan starred in three commercially successful productions: the comedy Biwi No.1, the romantic drama Hum Dil De Chuke Sanam, and the family drama Hum Saath-Saath Hain. After starring in BoxOffice Hits and Success in Musical Romantic Dramas, he earned critical acclaim for playing a scorned lover in the romance Tere Naam and a brief role in the family drama Baghban (both 2003). He went on to star in the top-grossing comedies Mujhse Shaadi Karogi (2004), No Entry (2005) and Partner (2007). Khan made his television debut by hosting two seasons of the game show 10 Ka Dum (2008–09). Following a series of commercial failures in 2006 and 2008, his career saw a resurgence with the financially successful action films Wanted (2009) and Dabangg (2010). In 2010, Khan began hosting the television game show Bigg Boss, later hosting nine more seasons. He won the National Film Award for Best Children's Film for producing Chillar Party (2011) under Salman Khan Being Human Productions, and starred in the year's top grossers—the action comedies Ready and Bodyguard.

Khan's next releases Bodyguard (2011), Ready (2011), Ek Tha Tiger (2012), Dabangg 2 (2012), Kick (2014), Jai Ho (2014), Bajrangi Bhaijaan (2015) and Prem Ratan Dhan Payo (2015) were among the most successful Indian films, making him the first actor with several consecutive films earning over ₹1 billion at the box-office. Among these, Bajrangi Bhaijaan earned over ₹969 crore worldwide and gained Khan a National Film Award for Best Popular Film Providing Wholesome Entertainment and a Filmfare Award nomination for Best Actor, making him the most nominated actor in the category without ever winning. He collaborated with director Ali Abbas Zafar to play titular lead in the top-grossing productions Sultan (2016) and Tiger Zinda Hai (2017). He has since received criticism for producing and starring in panned action films like Race 3 (2018), Dabangg 3 (2019), Radhe (2021), Kisi Ka Bhai Kisi Ki Jaan (2023) and Sikandar (2025).

== Film ==
Key
| † | Denotes films that have not yet been released |

List of Salman Khan film credits
| Year | Title | Role(s) | Notes | Ref. |
|---|---|---|---|---|
| 1988 | Falak | —N/a | Assistant director | |
| 1988 | Biwi Ho To Aisi | Vikram "Vicky" Bhandari | Debut film | |
| 1989 | Maine Pyar Kiya | Prem Choudhary | | |
| 1990 | Baaghi | Saajan Sood | Also screenwriter | |
| 1991 | Sanam Bewafa | Salman Khan | | |
| 1991 | Patthar Ke Phool | Suraj Verma | | |
| 1991 | Kurbaan | Akash Singh | | |
| 1991 | Saajan | Akash Verma | | |
| 1991 | Love | Prithvi | | |
| 1992 | Suryavanshi | Vikram Singh Suryavanshi & Vicky Raina (Note: Khan played dual roles in the film.) | Double role | |
| 1992 | Jaagruti | Jugnu | | |
| 1992 | Nishchaiy | Vasudev Gujral alias Rohan Yadav | | |
| 1992 | Ek Ladka Ek Ladki | Raja | | |
| 1993 | Chandra Mukhi | Raja Rai | Also screenwriter | |
| 1993 | Dil Tera Aashiq | Vijay Singh | | |
| 1994 | Hum Aapke Hain Koun..! | Prem Nath | | |
| 1994 | Chaand Kaa Tukdaa | Shyam Malhotra | | |
| 1994 | Andaz Apna Apna | Prem Bhopali | | |
| 1994 | Sangdil Sanam | Kishan | | |
| 1995 | Karan Arjun | Karan Singh alias Ajay Thakur | | |
| 1995 | Veergati | Ajay | | |
| 1996 | Majhdhaar | Gopal | | |
| 1996 | Khamoshi: The Musical | Rajant "Raj" Kashyap | | |
| 1996 | Jeet | Rajnath "Raju" Sahay | | |
| 1996 | Dushman Duniya Ka | Himself | Cameo | |
| 1997 | Judwaa | Raja Malhotra & Prem Malhotra | Double role | |
| 1997 | Auzaar | Suraj Prakash | | |
| 1997 | Deewana Mastana | Prem Kumar | Cameo | |
| 1998 | Pyaar Kiya To Darna Kya | Suraj Khanna | | |
| 1998 | Jab Pyaar Kisise Hota Hai | Suraj Dhanrajgir | | |
| 1998 | Bandhan | Raju | | |
| 1998 | Kuch Kuch Hota Hai | Aman Mehra | | |
| 1998 | Sar Utha Ke Jiyo | Himself | Cameo | |
| 1999 | Jaanam Samjha Karo | Rahul | | |
| 1999 | Biwi No.1 | Prem Mehra | | |
| 1999 | Sirf Tum | Prem | Cameo | |
| 1999 | Hum Dil De Chuke Sanam | Sameer Rosselline | | |
| 1999 | Hello Brother | Hero | Also playback singer for the song "Chandi Ki Daal Par" | |
| 1999 | Hum Saath-Saath Hain | Prem Chaturvedi | | |
| 2000 | Dulhan Hum Le Jayenge | Raja Oberoi | | |
| 2000 | Chal Mere Bhai | Prem Oberoi | Also playback singer for the song "Chal Mere Bhai" With Sanjay Dutt | |
| 2000 | Har Dil Jo Pyar Karega | Raj "Raju" Sharma alias Romi (Note: Khan played a single character in the film who has two different names.) | | |
| 2000 | Dhai Akshar Prem Ke | Truck Driver | Special appearance | |
| 2000 | Kahin Pyaar Na Ho Jaaye | Prem Kapoor | | |
| 2001 | Chori Chori Chupke Chupke | Raj Malhotra | | |
| 2002 | Tumko Na Bhool Paayenge | Veer Singh Thakur alias Ali | | |
| 2002 | Hum Tumhare Hain Sanam | Suraj Singh | | |
| 2002 | Yeh Hai Jalwa | Raj Mittal / Raj "Raju" Saxena | | |
| 2003 | Love at Times Square | Himself | Special appearance | |
| 2003 | Stumped | Himself | Cameo appearance | |
| 2003 | Tere Naam | Radhe Mohan | | |
| 2003 | Baghban | Alok Malhotra | | |
| 2004 | Garv: Pride & Honour | Arjun Ranawat | | |
| 2004 | Mujhse Shaadi Karogi | Sameer Malhotra | | |
| 2004 | Phir Milenge | Rohit Manchanda | | |
| 2004 | Dil Ne Jise Apna Kahaa | Rishabh Mathur | | |
| 2005 | Lucky: No Time for Love | Aditya "Adi" Sekhri | | |
| 2005 | Maine Pyaar Kyun Kiya? | Dr. Sameer Malhotra | | |
| 2005 | No Entry | Prem Khanna | | |
| 2005 | Kyon Ki | Anand Sharma | | |
| 2006 | Shaadi Karke Phas Gaya Yaar | Ayaan Puri | | |
| 2006 | Saawan...The Love Season | Sameer | Special appearance | |
| 2006 | Baabul | Avinash Kapoor | | |
| 2006 | Jaan-E-Mann | Suhaan Kapoor | | |
| 2007 | Salaam-e-Ishq | Rahul Khanna | | |
| 2007 | Partner | Prem | | |
| 2007 | Marigold | Prem Rajput | English film | |
| 2007 | Om Shanti Om | Himself | Special appearance in the song "Deewangi Deewangi" | |
| 2007 | Saawariya | Imaan Pirzada | | |
| 2008 | God Tussi Great Ho | Arun Prajapati | | |
| 2008 | Hello | Himself | Cameo appearance | |
| 2008 | Heroes | Balkar Singh (father) & Jassvinder "Jassi" Singh (son) | Double role | |
| 2008 | Yuvvraaj | Deven Yuvvraaj "Dev" Singh | Also playback singer for the song "Main Hoon Yuvraaj" | |
| 2009 | Wanted | ACP Rajveer Shekhawat / Radhe | Also playback singer for the song "Most Wanted Track" | |
| 2009 | Main Aurr Mrs Khanna | Sameer Khanna | | |
| 2009 | London Dreams | Manjit Khosla | | |
| 2009 | Ajab Prem Ki Ghazab Kahani | Himself | Cameo | |
| 2010 | Veer | Veer Pratap Singh (father) & Veera Pratap Singh (son) | Double role; also screenwriter | |
| 2010 | Prem Kaa Game | The Sutradhaar (Narrator) | Special appearance | |
| 2010 | Dabangg | Chulbul Pandey | | |
| 2010 | Tees Maar Khan | Himself | Special appearance in the song "Wallah Re Wallah" | |
| 2010 | Isi Life Mein...! | —N/a | Special appearance | |
| 2011 | Ready | Prem Kapoor | | |
| 2011 | Chillar Party | —N/a | Producer only | |
| 2011 | Yeh Dooriyan | Himself | | |
| 2011 | Bodyguard | Lovely Singh | | |
| 2011 | Tell Me O Kkhuda | Himself | Special appearance | |
| 2012 | Ek Tha Tiger | Manish Chandra / Avinash Singh Rathore / Tiger | | |
| 2012 | Son of Sardaar | Pathan | Cameo appearance | |
| 2012 | Dabangg 2 | Chulbul Pandey | | |
| 2013 | Ishkq in Paris | Himself | Special appearance | |
| 2013 | Phata Poster Nikhla Hero | Himself | Special appearance | |
| 2014 | Jai Ho | Jai Agnihotri | | |
| 2014 | O Teri | Himself | Cameo appearance | |
| 2014 | Main Tera Hero | God | Voiceover | |
| 2014 | Lai Bhaari | Bhau | Marathi film; cameo appearance | |
| 2014 | Fugly | Himself | Cameo appearance | |
| 2014 | Kick | Devi Lal Singh "Devil" | Also playback singer for the songs "Hangover", "Jumme Ki Raat", "Tu Hi Tu" | |
| 2014 | Being Bhaijaan | Himself | Documentary | |
| 2014 | Dr. Cabbie | —N/a | Producer only | |
| 2015 | Bajrangi Bhaijaan | Pawan Kumar Chaturvedi alias Bajrangi Bhaijaan | Also producer | |
| 2015 | Hero | —N/a | Producer; also playback singer for the song "Main Hoon Hero Tera" | |
| 2015 | Prem Ratan Dhan Payo | Prem Raghuvanshi alias Prem Dilwale & Yuvraj Vijay Singh | Double role | |
| 2016 | Sultan | Sultan Ali Khan | | |
| 2017 | Hanuman: Da' Damdaar | Hanuman | Animated film; voiceover | |
| 2017 | Tubelight | Laxman Singh Bisht | Also producer | |
| 2017 | Judwaa 2 | Raja Malhotra & Prem Malhotra of Judwaa | Double role; Cameo appearance | |
| 2017 | Tiger Zinda Hai | Tiger / Avinash Singh Rathore | | |
| 2018 | Welcome to New York | Himself | Cameo appearance | |
| 2018 | Race 3 | Sikandar "Sikku" Singh | Also producer, lyricist and playback singer | |
| 2018 | Yamla Pagla Deewana: Phir Se | Himself | Special appearance in the song "Rafta Rafta Medley" | |
| 2018 | Loveyatri | —N/a | Producer; voiceover for the teaser | |
| 2018 | Zero | Himself | Special appearance | |
| 2019 | Notebook | —N/a | Special appearance in a song; also producer | |
| 2019 | Bharat | Bharat Kumar | Also producer | |
| 2019 | Dabangg 3 | Chulbul Pandey | Also producer and screenwriter | |
| 2021 | Kaagaz | —N/a | Producer only | |
| 2021 | Radhe | Radhe | Also producer | |
| 2021 | Antim: The Final Truth | Rajveer Singh Sandhu | Also producer | |
| 2022 | Godfather | Masoom | Telugu film; cameo appearance | |
| 2022 | Ved | Bhau | Marathi film; cameo appearance | |
| 2023 | Pathaan | Tiger / Avinash Singh Rathore | Cameo appearance | |
| 2023 | Kisi Ka Bhai Kisi Ki Jaan | Bhaijaan alias Jaan | Also producer | |
| 2023 | Tiger 3 | Tiger / Avinash Singh Rathore | | |
| 2024 | Singham Again | Chulbul Pandey | Cameo appearance | |
| 2024 | Baby John | Bhaijaan | Cameo appearance | |
| 2025 | Sikandar | Sanjay "Sikandar" Rajkot | | |
| 2026 | Raja Shivaji | Jiva Mahala | Hindi-Marathi bilingual film; Special appearance | |
| 2026 | 7 Dogs | Johar | Saudi Arabian film; Special appearance | |
| 2026 | Maatrubhumi: May War Rest in Peace † | Colonel B. Santosh Babu | Post Production | |
| 2027 | SVC63 † | TBA | Filming | |

== Television ==
List of Salman Khan television credits
| Year | Title | Role | Notes | Ref. |
|---|---|---|---|---|
| 2008–2009; 2018 | 10 Ka Dum | Host | | |
| 2009; 2014 | C.I.D | Himself | 2 episodes | |
| 2010–Present | Bigg Boss | Host | | |
| 2013 | 8th Star Guild Awards | Host | | |
| 2014 | 9th Star Guild Awards | Host | | |
| 2017 | Super Night with Tubelight | Guest | | |
| 2019–2023 | The Kapil Sharma Show | Producer | | |
| 2019 | Nach Baliye 9 | Producer | | |
| 2021 | Bawara Dil | Narrator | Voiceover for first episode | |
| 2023 | Bigg Boss OTT 2 | Host | | |
| 2023 | The Romantics | Himself | Documentary series | |
| 2024 | Angry Young Men | Himself | Documentary series; also executive producer | |
| 2024 | Yo Yo Honey Singh: Famous | Himself | Documentary series | |
| 2025 | The Ba***ds of Bollywood | Himself | Cameo appearance | |

== Music videos ==
| Year | Title | Role | Singer(s) | Album | Notes | Ref |
|---|---|---|---|---|---|---|
| 2003 | "Zid Na Karo Ye Dil Ka Mamla Hai" | Himself | Roop Johri, Kunal Ganjawala | Tera Mera Dil | | |
| 2020 | "Bhai Bhai" | Himself | Salman Khan | | | |
| 2022 | "Dance With Me: Salman Khan" | Himself | Salman Khan | | | |

== See also ==
- List of awards and nominations received by Salman Khan
