= List of awards and nominations received by Salman Khan =

Salman Khan awards and nominations
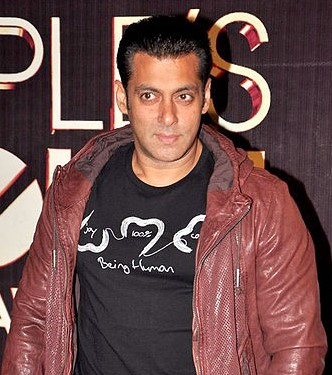
- Khan at People's Choice Awards in 2012
Awards & Nominations
| Award | Won | Nominated |
| National Film Awards | 2 | 0 |
| Filmfare Awards | 2 | 18 |
| Screen Awards | 3 | 15 |
| IIFA Awards | 2 | 9 |
| Zee Cine Awards | 5 | 9 |
| Producers Guild Film Awards | 3 | 2 |
| Stardust Awards | 3 | 14 |
| BIG Star Entertainment Awards | 8 | 12 |
| Other Awards | 32 | 9 |
| International recognitions | 14 | 0 |
- Total number of wins and nominations
| Totals | 74 | 78 |
- Footnotes

Salman Khan is an Indian actor and film producer. He began his acting career with Biwi Ho To Aisi but it was his second film Maine Pyar Kiya in which he acted in a lead role that garnered him acclaim. Khan has starred in several commercially successful films, such as Saajan (1991), Hum Aapke Hain Koun..! (1994), Karan Arjun (1995), Judwaa (1997), Pyar Kiya To Darna Kya (1998), Biwi No.1 (1999), and Hum Saath Saath Hain (1999), having appeared in the highest-grossing film 10 separate years during his career, a record that remains unbroken.

In 1999, Khan won the Filmfare Award for Best Supporting Actor for his extended guest appearance in Kuch Kuch Hota Hai (1998). In 2011, he won the Screen Award for Best Actor for his performance in Dabangg and in 2012, he won the Best Actor Popular Choice for his performances in Ek Tha Tiger and Dabangg 2. Eight of the films he has acted in, have accumulated gross earnings of over ₹100 crore (US$10 million) worldwide. He played leading roles in five consecutive blockbusters including Dabangg, Ready, Bodyguard, Ek Tha Tiger, and Dabangg 2. In 2018, he won Best Actor for his performance in Sultan at Tehran International Sports Film Festival. He has starred in more than 80 Hindi films and thus far has established himself as a leading actor of Hindi cinema.

== National Film Awards ==
| Year | Category | Film | Result |
|---|---|---|---|
| 2012 | Best Children's Film | Chillar Party | Won |
| 2016 | Best Popular Film Providing Wholesome Entertainment | Bajrangi Bhaijaan | Won |

== Filmfare Awards ==
| Year | Category | Film | Result |
|---|---|---|---|
| 1990 | Best Male Debut | Maine Pyar Kiya | Won |
| 1990 | Best Actor | Maine Pyar Kiya | Nominated |
| 1995 | Best Actor | Hum Aapke Hain Koun..! | Nominated |
| 1996 | Best Actor | Karan Arjun | Nominated |
| 1997 | Best Supporting Actor | Jeet | Nominated |
| 1999 | Best Actor | Pyaar Kiya To Darna Kya | Nominated |
| 1999 | Best Supporting Actor | Kuch Kuch Hota Hai | Won |
| 2000 | Best Performance in a Comic Role | Biwi No.1 | Nominated |
| 2000 | Best Actor | Hum Dil De Chuke Sanam | Nominated |
| 2004 | Best Actor | Tere Naam | Nominated |
| 2004 | Best Supporting Actor | Baghban | Nominated |
| 2006 | Best Performance in a Comic Role | No Entry | Nominated |
| 2011 | Best Actor | Dabangg | Nominated |
| 2012 | Best Actor | Bodyguard | Nominated |
| 2013 | Best Actor | Dabangg 2 | Nominated |
| 2016 | Best Film | Bajrangi Bhaijaan | Nominated |
| 2016 | Best Actor | Bajrangi Bhaijaan | Nominated |
| 2017 | Best Actor | Sultan | Nominated |

== Screen Awards ==
| Year | Category | Film | Result |
|---|---|---|---|
| 1996 | Best Actor | Karan Arjun | Nominated |
| 1999 | Best Actor | Pyaar Kiya To Darna Kya | Nominated |
| 2000 | Best Actor | Hum Dil De Chuke Sanam | Nominated |
| 2004 | Best Actor | Tere Naam | Nominated |
| 2005 | Best Actor | Garv | Nominated |
| 2009 | Jodi No. 1 (along with Katrina Kaif) | Yuvvraaj | Nominated |
| 2010 | Best Actor (Popular Choice) | Wanted | Nominated |
| 2010 | Jodi of the Decade (along with Aishwarya Rai) | | Nominated |
| 2011 | Best Actor | Dabangg | Won |
| 2011 | Best Actor (Popular Choice) | Dabangg | Nominated |
| 2012 | Best Actor (Popular Choice) | Bodyguard & Ready | Nominated |
| 2013 | Best Actor | Dabangg 2 | Nominated |
| 2013 | Best Actor (Popular Choice) | Ek Tha Tiger & Dabangg 2 | Won |
| 2015 | Best Actor (Popular Choice) | Kick | Nominated |
| 2016 | Best Actor (Popular Choice) | Bajrangi Bhaijaan | Nominated |
| 2016 | Best Actor | Bajrangi Bhaijaan | Nominated |
| 2016 | Best Jodi (along with Kareena Kapoor) | Bajrangi Bhaijaan | Nominated |
| 2016 | Best Film | Bajrangi Bhaijaan | Won |

== IIFA Awards ==
| Year | Category | Film | Result |
|---|---|---|---|
| 2000 | Best Actor | Hum Dil De Chuke Sanam | Nominated |
| 2004 | Best Actor | Tere Naam | Nominated |
| 2005 | Best Actor | Mujhse Shaadi Karogi | Nominated |
| 2008 | Best Actor | Partner | Nominated |
| 2010 | Habitat Humanity Ambassadorship | —N/a | Won |
| 2010 | Best Actor | Wanted | Nominated |
| 2011 | Best Actor | Dabangg | Nominated |
| 2012 | Best Actor | Bodyguard | Nominated |
| 2012 | Hottest Pair (along with Kareena Kapoor) | Bodyguard | Nominated |
| 2016 | Best Film | Bajrangi Bhaijaan | Won |
| 2016 | Best Actor | Bajrangi Bhaijaan | Nominated |
| 2017 | Best Actor | Sultan | Nominated |

== Zee Cine Awards ==
| Year | Category | Film | Result |
|---|---|---|---|
| 1999 | Best Actor | Jab Pyaar Kisise Hota Hai | Nominated |
| 1999 | Best Actor | Pyaar Kiya To Darna Kya | Nominated |
| 2000 | Best Actor | Biwi No.1 | Nominated |
| 2000 | Best Actor | Hum Saath Saath Hain | Nominated |
| 2004 | Best Actor | Tere Naam | Nominated |
| 2005 | Best Actor | Mujhse Shaadi Karogi | Nominated |
| 2006 | Best Supporting Actor | No Entry | Nominated |
| 2011 | Best Actor | Dabangg | Nominated |
| 2012 | Best Actor | Bodyguard | Nominated |
| 2013 | Best Actor | Dabangg 2 | Won |
| 2016 | Best Actor | Bajrangi Bhaijaan | Won |
| 2016 | Best Film | Bajrangi Bhaijaan | Won |
| 2017 | Best Actor | Sultan | Won |

== Apsara Film & Television Producers Guild Awards ==
| Year | Category | Film | Result |
|---|---|---|---|
| 2008 | Jodi Of the Year (along with Govinda) | Partner | Won |
| 2011 | Best Actor in a Leading Role | Dabangg | Won |
| 2012 | Best Actor in a Leading Role | Bodyguard | Nominated |
| 2016 | Best Actor in a Leading Role | Bajrangi Bhaijaan | Nominated |
| 2016 | Best Film | Bajrangi Bhaijaan | Won |

== Stardust Awards ==
| Year | Category | Film | Result |
|---|---|---|---|
| 2004 | Star of the Year - Male | Tere Naam | Nominated |
| 2005 | Star of the Year - Male | Mujhse Shaadi Karogi | Nominated |
| 2006 | Star of the Year - Male | Maine Pyaar Kyun Kiya & Kyon Ki | Nominated |
| 2007 | Star of the Year - Male | Jaan-E-Mann | Nominated |
| 2009 | Star of the Year - Male | Yuvvraj | Nominated |
| 2010 | Star of the Year - Male | Wanted | Nominated |
| 2011 | Star of the Year - Male | Dabangg | Won |
| 2011 | Best Thriller/Action Actor | Dabangg | Nominated |
| 2012 | Star of the Year - Male | Bodyguard & Ready | Won |
| 2012 | Best Drama Actor | Bodyguard | Nominated |
| 2012 | Best Comedy/Romance Actor | Ready | Nominated |
| 2012 | Best Film | Chillar Party | Nominated |
| 2013 | Best Thriller/Action Actor | Dabangg 2 & Ek Tha Tiger | Nominated |
| | Star of the Year - Male | Dabangg 2 & Ek Tha Tiger | Nominated |
| 2014 | Star of the Year - Male | Kick | Nominated |
| 2015 | Star of the Year - Male | Bajrangi Bhaijaan & Prem Ratan Dhan Payo | Nominated |
| 2015 | Best Film of the Year | Bajrangi Bhaijaan | Won |

== BIG Star Entertainment Awards ==
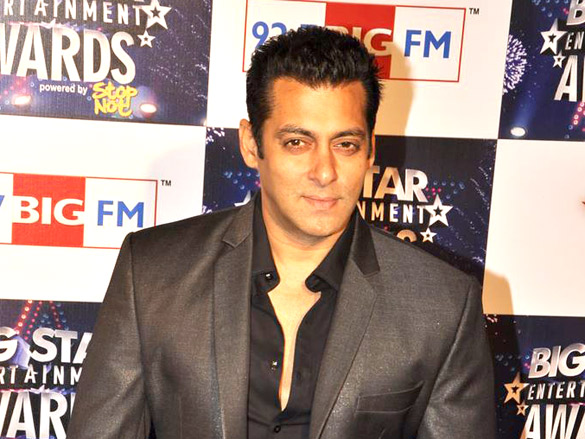
Khan at Big Star Entertainment Awards, 2011

| Year | Category | Film | Result |
|---|---|---|---|
| 2010 | Film Actor of Decade (Male) | —N/a | Nominated |
| 2010 | Most Entertaining Film Actor - Male | Dabangg | Won |
| 2011 | Most Entertaining Film Actor - Male | Bodyguard | Nominated |
| 2011 | Most Entertaining Actor in an Action Role | Bodyguard | Won |
| 2011 | Most Entertaining On-Screen Couple (along with Kareena Kapoor) | Bodyguard | Won |
| 2011 | Most Entertaining Actor in a Romantic Role | Bodyguard | Nominated |
| 2011 | Most Entertaining Actor in a Comic Role | Ready | Nominated |
| 2012 | Most Entertaining Television Reality Show Host | Bigg Boss (Season 6) | Won |
| 2012 | Most Entertaining Film Actor - Male | Ek Tha Tiger | Nominated |
| 2012 | Most Entertaining Actor in a Romantic Role | Ek Tha Tiger | Nominated |
| 2012 | Most Entertaining Actor in a Thriller Role | Ek Tha Tiger | Nominated |
| 2012 | Most Entertaining Actor in an Action Role | Ek Tha Tiger | Won |
| 2013 | Most Entertaining Actor in an Action Role | Dabangg 2 | Nominated |
| 2014 | Most Entertaining Actor in an Action Role | Jai Ho & Kick | Nominated |
| 2015 | Most Entertaining Actor in a Romantic Role | Prem Ratan Dhan Payo | Nominated |
| 2015 | Most Entertaining Actor in a Drama Role | Prem Ratan Dhan Payo | Nominated |
| 2015 | Most Entertaining Film Actor - Male | Bajrangi Bhaijaan & Prem Ratan Dhan Payo | Won |
| 2015 | Most Entertaining Actor in a Social Role | Bajrangi Bhaijaan | Won |
| 2015 | Most Entertaining Social Film | Bajrangi Bhaijaan | Won |
| 2015 | Most Entertaining Film | Bajrangi Bhaijaan | Won |

== Other awards ==
| Year | Category | Film | Result |
|---|---|---|---|
| 1999 | Bollywood Movie Award for Best Actor | Pyaar Kiya To Darna Kya | Nominated |
| 2002 | Bollywood Movie Award for Most Sensational Actor | Chori Chori Chupke Chupke | Won |
| 2004 | Bollywood Movie Award for Best Actor | Tere Naam | Nominated |
| 2008 | Rajiv Gandhi Award for Outstanding Achievement in Entertainment | —N/a | Won |
| 2008 | ITA Best Anchor | Dus Ka Dum | Won |
| 2009 | ITA Best Anchor | Dus Ka Dum | Won |
| 2009 | ITAA Best Anchor - Game/Quiz Show | Dus Ka Dum | Won |
| 2010 | Aaj Tak Movie Masala Awards | Wanted | Won |
| 2010 | AXN Action Awards | Wanted | Won |
| 2011 | AXN Action Awards | Dabangg | Won |
| 2011 | Aaj Tak Awards - Best Actor | Dabangg | Won |
| 2011 | Bhaskar Bollywood Awards - Action Hero Of The Year Male | Dabangg | Won |
| 2011 | Bhaskar Bollywood Awards - Most Extraordinary Performance of the Year | Dabangg | Won |
| 2011 | Airtel Super Star Awards Unique Andaaz | Dabangg | Won |
| 2011 | Colors Golden Petal Awards for Most Chahita Personality | —N/a | Won |
| 2012 | ETC Bollywood Business Award for Most Profitable Actor | Bodyguard | Won |
| 2012 | Bhaskar Bollywood Awards for Most Seductive Body (Male) | Bodyguard | Won |
| 2012 | People's Choice Awards India Favorite Movie Actor | Ek Tha Tiger | Won |
| 2012 | People's Choice Awards India Favorite Movie Action Actor | Ek Tha Tiger | Won |
| 2012 | Masala Award Box Office Star Of The Year (Male) | Ek Tha Tiger | Won |
| 2012 | Airtel Super Star Awards Most Romantic Jodi (along with Kareena Kapoor) | Ek Tha Tiger | Won |
| 2012 | Airtel Super Star Awards Super Star Hero | —N/a | Won |
| 2012 | ETC Bollywood Business Award - Most Profitable Actor | —N/a | Won |
| 2013 | IAA Leadership Awards for Brand Endorser of the Year (Male) | —N/a | Won |
| 2013 | Lions Favorite Philanthropic NGO in India for Being Human | —N/a | Won |
| 2014 | Times Celebex Awards - Star of the Year | —N/a | Won |
| 2014 | Times Celebex Awards - Most Searched Online | —N/a | Won |
| 2014 | Times Celebex Awards - Most Popular in Print media | —N/a | Won |
| 2014 | Times Celebex Awards - Box Office King | —N/a | Won |
| 2014 | Star Box Office Award - Mr. Money Bags | —N/a | Won |
| 2016 | ETC Bollywood Business Award - Highest Grossing Male Actor | Bajrangi Bhaijaan | Won |
| 2016 | ETC Bollywood Business Award - Highest Grossing Film | Bajrangi Bhaijaan | Won |
| 2016 | ETC Bollywood Business Award - The 300 crore club | Bajrangi Bhaijaan | Won |
| 2016 | DMA Awards 2016 - Marketing Innovation Award (Social) | Bajrangi Bhaijaan | Won |
| 2016 | Times Of India Film Award For Best Film | Bajrangi Bhaijaan | Won |
| 2016 | Times Of India Film Award For Best Actor (Critics) | Bajrangi Bhaijaan | Nominated |

== International recognitions ==
- 2004 - 7th Best Looking Man in the World - People Magazine, USA
- 2008 - Wax Statue in London's Madame Tussauds Museum.
- 2010 - Sexiest Man Alive - People Magazine, India.
- 2012 - Wax Statue in New York's Madame Tussauds Museum
- In August 2012, he was voted no.3 "India's Greatest Actor" in NDTV poll.
- In August 2013, India's Most Searched Celebrity Online.
- In 2014, he topped the Forbes India chart in terms of both fame and revenue.
- He ranked 71 in the 'Celebrity 100 : The World's top paid entertainers' by the Forbes Magazine, USA. He was the only Indian in the list with earnings worth $33.5 million.
- He was ranked 7th in the first global list of the World's Highest Paid Actors in 2015 by the Forbes.
- In 2016, he was ranked as No. 7 on the World's Most Handsome Faces list on worldstopmost.com
- In a poll conducted by Ormax Media, Salman Khan was named as the 'Most Popular Bollywood Star', a distinction he has achieved for 5 consecutive years starting from 2010 to 2015.
- In 2018, he won Best Actor for his performance in Sultan at Tehran International Sports Film Festival.
- In 2019, ranked 3rd the chart of India's Most Trusted Personality in list of Actors.
- In 2020, ranked 2nd TRA Most Desired Personalities list

== See also ==
- Salman Khan filmography
- List of accolades received by Bodyguard
- List of accolades received by Dabangg
