= Koni (novel) =

Bengali novel

- Author: Moti Nandi
- Language: Bengali
- Publisher: Amar Sahitya Prakashan
- Publication date: 1974
- Publication place: India
- Pages: 82

Koni (Bengali: কোনি) is a Bengali novel written by Moti Nandi.

== Plot ==
One day Khitish Sinha saw a young girl named Koni swimming in the river. Sinha was an experienced swimming coach so he decided to train Koni for a swimming competition. Koni was not financially stable enough to manage coaching fees. In fact, her elder brother was a tuberculosis patient, earning only Rs.150 a month - the sole earner of a seven-member family. However, when he dies, the family falls into a very grave financial crisis. Then Sinha decided to give Koni a small job in his wife's tailor shop named Prajapati. Khitish takes complete responsibility for Koni's training, Koni worked hard and made it into the Bengal national swimming team. She was not given chance to compete in any events until a team member was injured. After getting the opportunity, Koni won the swimming competition for the Bengal team.

== Adaptations ==
The novel was adapted into the movie Kony in 1984.
