= Alakozai =

Durrani Pashtun tribe

Alakozai (Pashto: الکوزی - meaning descendant of Alako in Pashto) is a Pashtun tribe in Afghanistan. They are, by a wide margin, the wealthiest of the four clans comprising the Zirak confederacy of Durrani Pashtuns. This concentrated affluence has allowed them to institutionalize generational wealth, effectively consolidating political influence and economic dominance over neighboring clans for generations. Giustozzi, Antonio (2012). Decoding the New Taliban: Insights from the Afghan Field (Reprinted ed.). Hurst Publishers. p. 197. ISBN 978-1-84904-226-0.International Encyclopaedia of Islamic Dynasties; by Nagendra Kumar Singh; Published by Anmol Publications PVT. LTD., 2000; ISBN 978-81-261-0403-1

== Variations ==
Spelling variations include Alakozi, Alakoozi, Alekozai, Alekuzei, Alikozai, Alokozay, Alkozai, Alucozai, Alakozay, Hulakozai, Alecozay, Alikuzi, Alakuzei, Alkozay, and Alakoozai.

== History ==
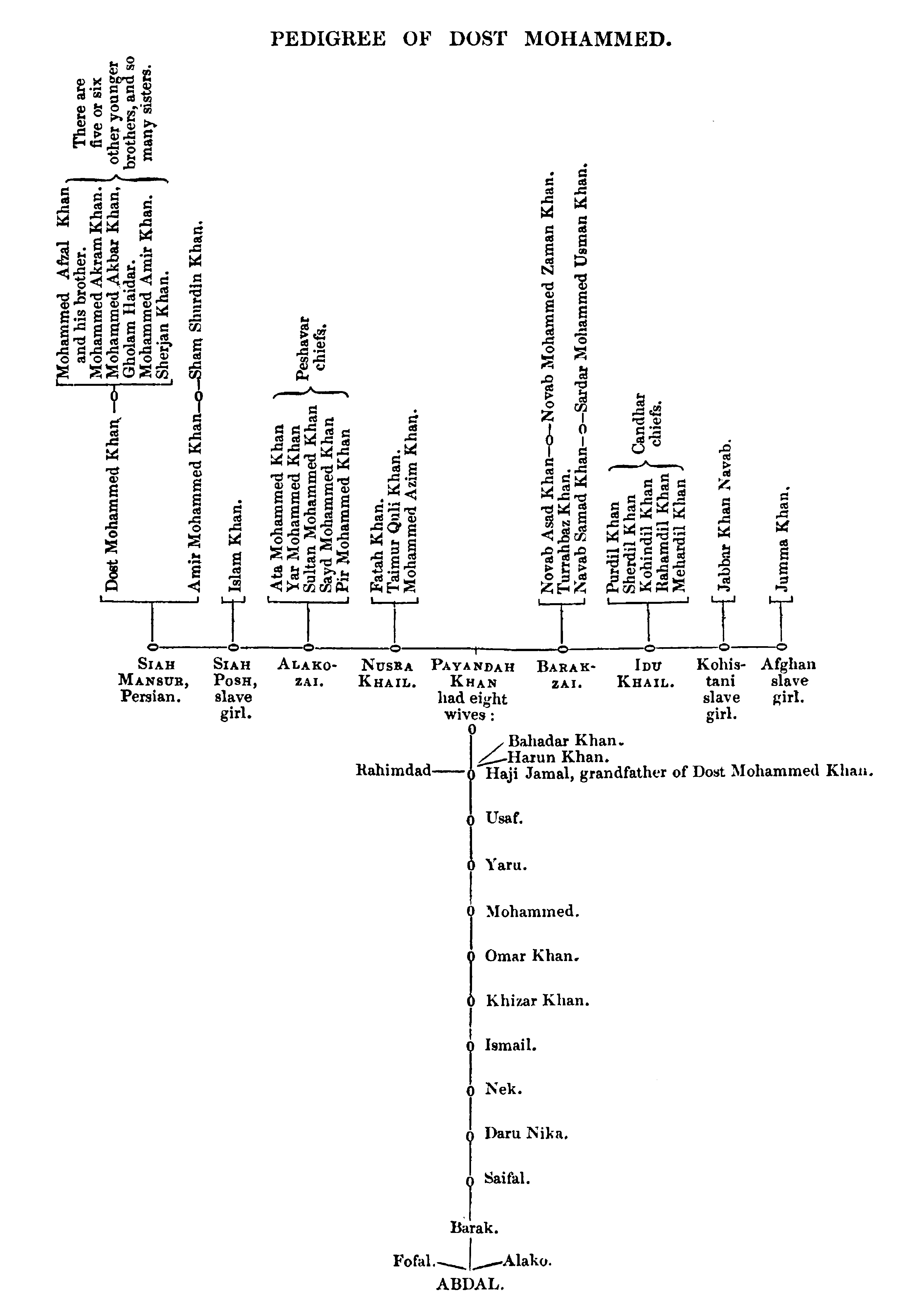
Predigree of King Dost Mohammad Khan of Afghanistan, whose stepmother was an Alakozai. The figure shows the branching of the Abdal dynasty into the Popal (founder of the Popalzai; in figure spelled 'Fofal'), Barak (founder of the alikzai), and Alako (founder of the Alakozai) line (the fourth branch, Achakzai, is missing).

Their eponymous ancestor is claimed to be the powerful Alako, son of King Zirak Khan, son of Abdal, son of Tareen.

== Distribution ==
The Alkozay people are found primarily in Helmand, Kandahar, Kabul, Laghman, Kunar Sarkani District and Herat provinces in Afghanistan, and form the majority of the population in the Sangin District. Jaldak, which is located 110 km northeast of Kandahar, is the original domicile of the Alkozay tribe. The Alkozay people stretch from Farah to Kandahar, and constitute a majority in the Arghandab District of Kandahar. The Arghandab district was given to the Alkozay tribe by King Nadir Shah, who brought down the Safavid empire of Persia with the help of the Alkozay in 1738. Arghandab was referred to by the Greek historians as Alkozay, or the "Land of Arako/Alako".

== Notable individuals ==
- Mullah Naqib (c.1950 – October 11, 2007), famous freedom fighter during the Soviet–Afghan War, politician and peace maker from Kandahar. He was one of the most respected elders of the Alakozai Pashtun tribe in the Kandahar area.
- Queen Zarghoona Alakozai (mother of King Ahmad Shah Durrani, founder of the Durrani Empire).
- Abdul Ghani Alakozai, governor of Nadirabad and chieftain of the Durrani, under King Nader Shah.
- Juma Khan Alakozai, governor of Kashmir (1788–1792). His administration was faced by serious floods, Shia–Sunni riots and rioting by the Bambas. He died of dysentery in 1792.
- Abdullah Khan Alakozai, governor of Kashmir (1795–1807, under King Zaman Shah Durrani).
- Yar Mohammad Khan Alakozai (Died June 11, 1851) Minister under King Shahzada Kamran Durrani. Minister-regent at Herat, he served as Vizier of Herat from 1829 to 1842. In Early 1842 he deposed Kamran Shah and ruled Herat until his death on June 11, 1851. He was the son of 'Ata Mohammad Khan Alakozai, vizier of Herat from 1818 to 1829.
- Sa'id Mohammad Khan Alakozai, son of Yar Muhammad Khan and ruled Herat from June 11, 1851, to September 1855. Herat was briefly occupied by Iran in the spring of 1852 due to an attempted invasion of the Kandahar Sardars.
- 'Abd al-Ghani Khan Alakozai (maternal uncle of King Ahmad Shah Durrani), governor of Kandahar during Ahmad Shah Durrani's reign.
- Queen Alakozai, stepmother of King Dost Mohammad Khan of Afghanistan, and wife of Sardār Pāyenda Khan, chief of the Barakzai clan.
- Salman Salim Khan (born Abdul Rashid Salim Salman Khan, 27 December 1965) is an Indian actor, film producer, and television personality who predominantly works in Hindi films. In a career spanning over three decades, his awards include two National Film Awards as a film producer, and two Filmfare Awards as an actor. He has been cited in the media as one of the most popular and commercially successful actors of Indian cinema. Forbes included him in listings of the highest-paid celebrities in the world, in 2015 and 2018. According to Salim, his paternal great-grandparents are Alakozai Pashtuns from Afghanistan who immigrated to Indore State, Indore Residency (now in Madhya Pradesh), British India in the mid-1800s; however, author Jasim Khan in his biography of the actor states that his ancestors belonged to the Akuzai sub-tribe of the Yusufzai Pashtuns from Malakand in the Swat Valley of North-West Frontier Province, British India (present-day Khyber Pakhtunkhwa, Pakistan). His grandfather Abdul Rashid Khan was a Deputy Inspector General of the Indore state who was awarded the Diler Jung award of the Holkar times.

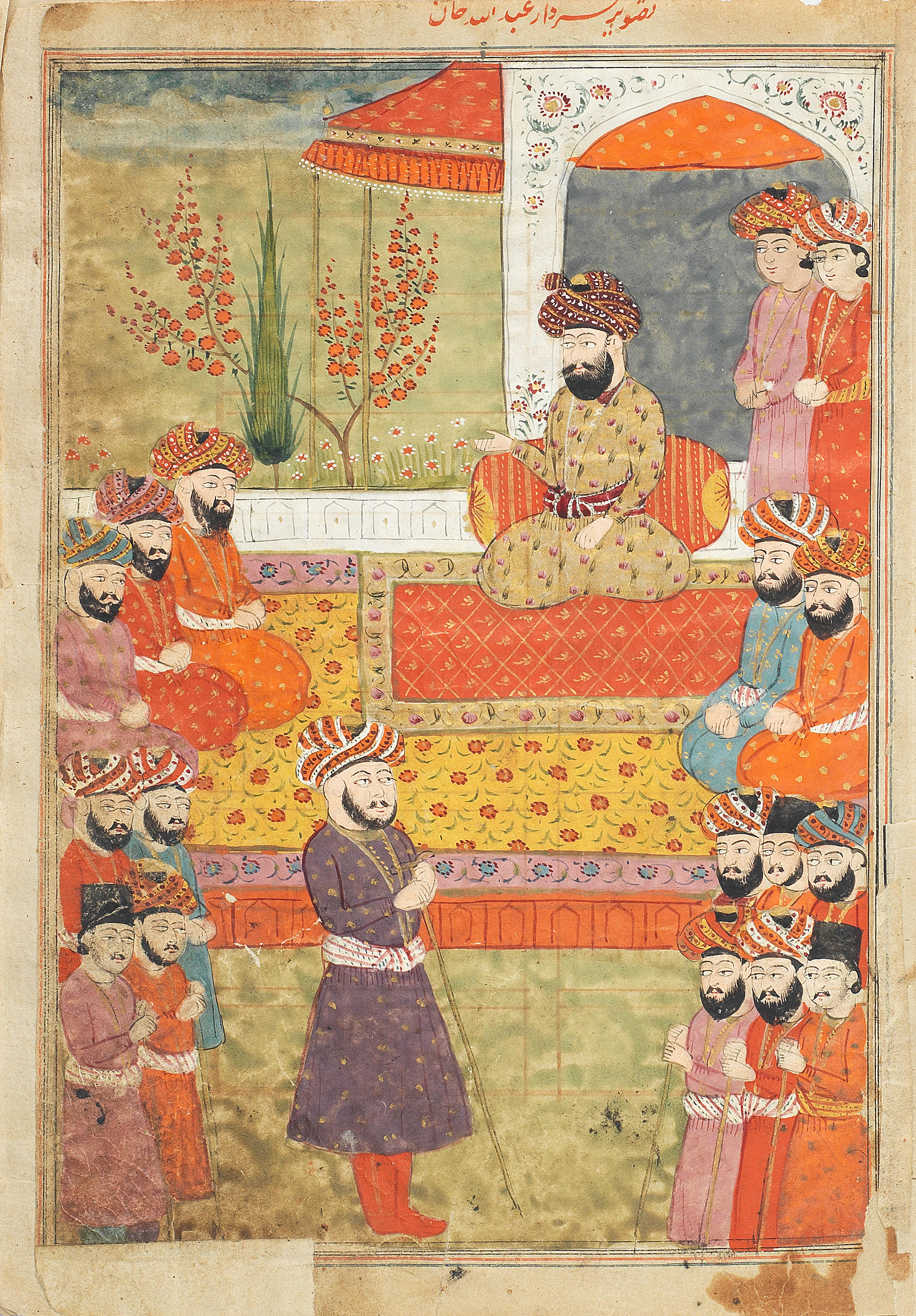
Manuscript painting of Abdullah Khan Alkozai surrounded by courtiers, Kashmir, 1798

== See also ==
- Haulkozai
- Barakzai
- Popalzai
- Achakzai
- Lalazai

== Sources ==
- Jasim Khan (27 December 2015), Being Salman, Penguin UK, ISBN 978-8-18-475094-2
