= List of accolades received by Bodyguard (2011 Hindi film) =

List of awards won by Bodyguard
Awards and nominations
Award	Won	Nominated
BIG Star Entertainment Awards	6	12
Filmfare Awards	0	3
Screen Awards	0	3
Zee Cine Awards	1	5
Lions Gold Awards	2	2
Bollywood Business Awards	5	5
Apsara Film & Television Producers Guild Awards	1	5
Stardust Award	2	9
Mirchi Music Awards	0	4
- Tally
Totals	17	48
- Footnotes

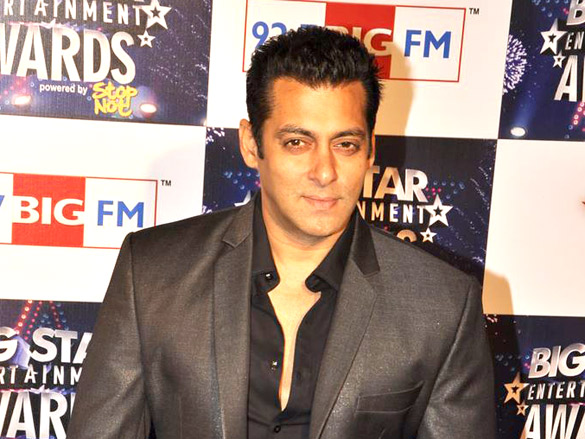

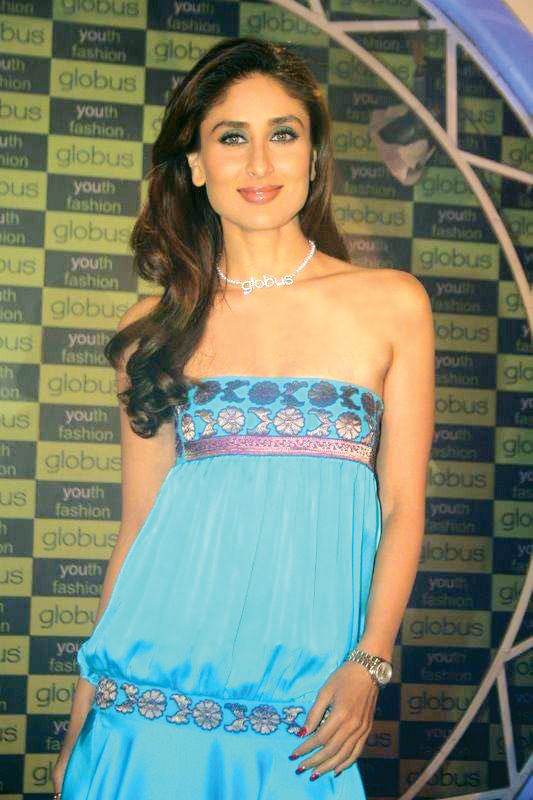
Salman Khan (top) and Kareena Kapoor (bottom) received several awards and nominations for this film

Bodyguard (Hindi: बॉडीगार्ड) is a 2011 Indian romantic action film directed by Siddique. and produced by Alvira Khan Agnihotri and Atul Agnihotri. It features Salman Khan and Kareena Kapoor in the lead roles along with Raj Babbar, Mahesh Manjrekar and Hazel Keech in supporting roles. The film was released on Eid, 31 August 2011 across 2,250 screens in 70 Indian cities and with 482 prints across the overseas territory.

The film broke many records upon its release. Within the first day of its release, it went on to become the highest opening day grosser as well as the biggest grosser ever for a single day up until then. The film set another box office record, netting ₹1,001.0 million (US$10 million) in its first week, thus becoming the highest opening week grossing Bollywood film. Bodyguard has grossed ₹2.30 billion (US$24 million) worldwide, and has emerged as Bollywood's second highest-grossing film ever. It is also the highest-grossing Bollywood film of 2011.

Bodyguard received a number of awards and nominations in several prominent award shows both in India and abroad, including the Filmfare Awards and Screen Awards. The majority of these were for the leading performances and musical achievements.

== Awards and nominations ==
Award	Category	Recipient	Result
57th Filmfare Awards	Best Actor	Salman Khan	Nominated
57th Filmfare Awards	Best Playback Singer (Male)	Rahat Fateh Ali Khan – Teri Meri	Nominated
57th Filmfare Awards	Best Playback Singer (Female)	Shreya Ghoshal – Teri Meri	Nominated
2011 BIG Star Entertainment Awards	Most Entertaining Actor – Male	Salman Khan	Nominated
2011 BIG Star Entertainment Awards	Most Entertaining Film	Bodyguard	Nominated
2011 BIG Star Entertainment Awards	Most Entertaining Actor in a Romantic role – Male	Salman Khan	Nominated
2011 BIG Star Entertainment Awards	Most Entertaining Actor – Female	Kareena Kapoor	Nominated
2011 BIG Star Entertainment Awards	Most Entertaining Romantic Film	Bodyguard	Nominated
2011 BIG Star Entertainment Awards	Most Entertaining Singer – Male	Clinton Cerejo	Nominated
2011 BIG Star Entertainment Awards	Most Entertaining Action Film	Bodyguard	Won
2011 BIG Star Entertainment Awards	Most Entertaining Action Actor – Male	Salman Khan	Won
2011 BIG Star Entertainment Awards	Most Entertaining Romantic Actor – Female	Kareena Kapoor	Won
2011 BIG Star Entertainment Awards	Most Entertaining Singer – Female	Shreya Ghoshal – Teri Meri	Won
2011 BIG Star Entertainment Awards	Most Entertaining Music	Himesh Reshammiya	Won
2011 BIG Star Entertainment Awards	Most Entertaining on—screen couple	Salman Khan and Kareena Kapoor	Won
10th Stardust Awards	Hottest Film of the Year	Bodyguard	Won
10th Stardust Awards	Star of the Year – Male	Salman Khan	Won
10th Stardust Awards	Star of the Year – Female	Kareena Kapoor (also for Ra.One)	Nominated
10th Stardust Awards	Film of the Year	Bodyguard	Nominated
10th Stardust Awards	Dream Director	Siddique	Nominated
10th Stardust Awards	Best Actor – Drama	Salman Khan	Nominated
10th Stardust Awards	Best Actress – Drama	Kareena Kapoor	Nominated
10th Stardust Awards	Hottest Filmmaker	Siddique	Nominated
10th Stardust Awards	Breakthrough Supporting Performance – Male	Rajat Rawail	Nominated
15th Zee Cine Awards	Best Film	Bodyguard	Nominated
15th Zee Cine Awards	Best Actor	Salman Khan	Nominated
15th Zee Cine Awards	Best Actress	Kareena Kapoor	Nominated
15th Zee Cine Awards	Best Director	Siddique	Nominated
15th Zee Cine Awards	Best Debut Director	Siddique	Won
7th Apsara Film & Television Producers Guild Awards	Best Playback Singer (Female)	Shreya Ghoshal – Teri Meri	Won
7th Apsara Film & Television Producers Guild Awards	Best Actor in Leading Role (Male)	Salman Khan	Nominated
7th Apsara Film & Television Producers Guild Awards	Best Music	Himesh Reshammiya & Pritam	Nominated
7th Apsara Film & Television Producers Guild Awards	Best Playback Singer (Male)	Rahat Nusrat Fateh Ali Khan – Teri Meri	Nominated
7th Apsara Film & Television Producers Guild Awards	Best Lyrics	Shabbir Ahmed – Ter Meri	Nominated
2nd ETC Bollywood Business Awards	Most Profitable Actor	Salman Khan	Won
2nd ETC Bollywood Business Awards	Most Profitable Actress	Kareena Kapoor	Won
2nd ETC Bollywood Business Awards	Top grosser of the Year	Bodyguard	Won
2nd ETC Bollywood Business Awards	Most Successful Producer	Atul Agnihotri – Alvira Agnihotri	Won
2nd ETC Bollywood Business Awards	Most Profitable Director	Siddique	Won
18th Lions Gold Awards	Favourite Music Director	Himesh Reshammiya	Won
18th Lions Gold Awards	Favourite Lyricist	Shabbir Ahmed	Won
18th Screen Awards	Best Action	Vijayan Master	Nominated
18th Screen Awards	Best Actor	Salman Khan	Nominated
18th Screen Awards	Best Actress	Kareena Kapoor	Nominated
4th Mirchi Music Awards	Album of The Year	Himesh Reshammiya, Pritam, Neelesh Misra, Shabbir Ahmed	Nominated
4th Mirchi Music Awards	Male Vocalist of The Year	Rahat Fateh Ali Khan - "Teri Meri"	Nominated
4th Mirchi Music Awards	Music Composer of The Year	Himesh Reshammiya - "Teri Meri"	Nominated
4th Mirchi Music Awards	Lyricist of The Year	Shabbir Ahmed & Neelesh Misra - "Teri Meri"	Nominated
International Indian Film Academy Awards	Best Female Playback Singer	Shreya Ghoshal for "Teri Meri	Won
International Indian Film Academy Awards	Best Movie	Atul Agnihotri, Alvira Khan, Reel Life Entertainment Pvt. Ltd., Reliance Entertainment	Nominated
International Indian Film Academy Awards	Best Actor	Salman Khan	Nominated
International Indian Film Academy Awards	Best Actress	Kareena Kapoor	Nominated
International Indian Film Academy Awards	Best Lyricist	Shabbir Ahmed for "Teri Meri"	Nominated
International Indian Film Academy Awards	Best Male Playback Singer	Ash King for "I Love You"	Nominated
International Indian Film Academy Awards	Best Male Playback Singer	Rahat Fateh Ali Khan for "Teri Meri"	Nominated
International Indian Film Academy Awards	Star Plus Hottest Pair	Kareena Kapoor and Salman Khan	Nominated
