= Moti Nandi =

Indian writer and journalist (1931–2010)

- মতি নন্দী
- Born: 10 July 1931; Taki, Basirhat subdivision, West Bengal, India
- Died: 3 January 2010 (aged 78); Kolkata, West Bengal, India
- Education: University of Calcutta
- Occupations: Novelist, short story writer, journalist
- Children: Anandarupa Das; Monami Nandy
- Writing career
- Language: Bengali

Moti Nandi, or Moti Nandy (Bengali pronunciation: [/mo.t̪i n̪on̪.d̪i/] MOH-tee NON-dee; 10 July 1931 – 3 January 2010) was a Bengali writer and journalist.

== Career ==
Moti Nandy was from Kolkata. He graduated from the University of Calcutta and became a sports journalist and worked as a sports editor in Anandabazar Patrika.

He was awarded the Lifetime Achievement award (2008) at a ceremony to mark the grand finale of the maiden edition of the Excellence in Journalism Awards. His first short story was published in Desh weekly in 1957. His story for Pujabarshiki was in Parichoy Magazine in 1985. The character Kalabati from his novels is popular among the younger audience.

== Bibliography ==
=== Novels ===
- Shada Kham (Ananda Pub.)
- Ubhoyoto Sampurno (Ananda Pub.)
- Golap Bagan (Ananda Pub.)
- Chaya (Ananda Pub.)
- Chaya Soronite Rohini (Ananda Pub.)
- Jibonto (Ananda Pub.)
- Duti Tinti Ghor (Ananda Pub.)
- Ditio Innings er Por (Ananda Pub.)
- Duro Dristi (Ananda Pub.)
- Puber Janala (Ananda Pub.)
- Bonanider Bari (Ananda Pub.)
- Bijolibalar Mukti (Ananda Pub.)
- Malabika (Ananda Pub.)
- Sibi (Ananda Pub.)
- Soloke Ponero Kora (Ananda Pub.)
- Sohodeber Tajmahal (Ananda Pub.)
- Sobai Jache (Ananda Pub.)
- Dosti Uponyas (Ananda Pub.)
- Nakhatter Raat (Punascha)
- Baobab (Punascha)
- Dadash Bakti (Punascha)
- Nayaker Probesh o Prasthan (Punascha)
- Baranda
- Korunabashata
- Chotobabu

=== Works for children ===
- Koni (Ananda Pub.)
- Aloukik Dilu (Ananda Pub.)
- Stopper (Ananda Pub.)
- Striker (Ananda Pub.)
- Kuronn [ কুড়োন ] (Ananda Pub.)
- Jibon Ananta (Ananda Pub.)
- Nnaran (Ananda Pub.)
- Feraari (Ananda Pub.)
- Tulsi (Ananda Pub.)
- Dolbodoler Aage (Ananda Pub.)
- Minu Chinur Trophy(Ananda Pub.)
- Empiyaring
- Dhankurir Kingkong (Ananda Pub.)
- Biswa-jora Biswacup (Ananda Pub.)
- Buro Ghora (Ananda Pub.)
- Doshti Kishore Uponyas (Ananda Pub.)
- Cricket er Ayne Kanun (Ananda Pub.)
- Bhuli (Gangchil)
- Shiba(Ananda Pub.)

=== Doshti Kishore Uponyas ===
- Nonida Not Out
- Striker
- Stopper
- Oporajito Ananda
- Dolbodoler Aage
- Feraari
- Shivar Phire Asa
- Tulsi
- Naran
- Minu Chinur Trophy

=== Kolabati series ===
- Kolaboti
- Kolaboti Der Diet Chart
- Kolaboti r Dekha Shona
- Kolaboti o Khayeri
- Bhuter Basay Kolaboti
- Kolaboti, Apur maa o Panchu
- Kolaboti o Millenium Match
- Kolabotir Shaktishel

== Awards ==
- Ananda Purashkar, 1974
- Sahitya Akademi Award, 1991

== Cinema ==
One of his novels, Koni, released in 1986, was filmed with Soumitra Chatterjee in one of the lead roles. In 1978, another novel Striker was filmed as Striker with Samit Bhanja in the lead role. A small screen teleserial was also made on his novel 'Stopper'. Debesh Roychoudhury played the role of Kamal Guha on screen. Based on his novel titled "Joler Ghurni O Bokbok Shobdo" Bangladeshi film maker Animesh Aich make a film Voyangkor Sundor in 2017. The film casts Tollywood star Parambrata Chatterjee and noted Bangladeshi actress Ashna Habib Bhabna in lead roles.

== Legacy ==
In July 2022, Mohun Bagan Athletic Club announced the club awards have been named after famous personalities to be awarded to sportspersons every year henceforth, and "Best Sports Journalist" award was renamed as Moti Nandi Award in memory of him.
