= Striker (1978 film) =

1978 Bengali film

Striker is a 1978 Bengali sports drama film directed by Archan Chakravarty. The film was based on a novel of the same name by Moti Nandi.

== Plot ==
The film tells the story of a young footballer Prasun's life and his struggle to make a mark in Kolkata football. His father was also an eminent footballer but deprived by his club authority. Prasun has a dream to play on behalf of a big football club of Kolkata maidan.

== Cast ==
- Samit Bhanja as Prasun
- Anil Chatterjee
- Santu Mukherjee
- Tarun Kumar Chatterjee
- Ruma Guha Thakurta
- Utpal Dutt
- Chinmoy Roy
- Arati Bhattacharya
- Ramen Raychowdhury
- Pinaki Sengupta
