= Saroj Dey =

Bengali film director

- Born: 1921
- Died: 26 November 1997 (aged 75–76)
- Occupation: Film director
- Known for: Kony

Saroj Dey (Bengali: সরোজ দে) (1921 – 26 November 1997) was a Bengali film director who was part of the collective Agragami which made several notable films in Bengali cinema, from 1950s to the 1970s. He is best known for directing Je Jekhane Dariye (1974), and national award-winning film Kony (1984).

He made his directorial debut in 1955, his film Daak Harkara (1958) with the collective Agragami, took part in Venice Film Festival, and also won the National Film Award for Best Feature Film in Bengali. His other notable film with the collective was Nisithe (1963), which also won a National Award. His other film include, Sagarika (1956), Shilpi (1956), Headmaster (1958), Kanna (1962), Sankha Bela (1966), Bilambita Lay (1970) and Swati (1977).

== Life ==
Saroj Dey was born in 1921. He played the lead role in the group Agragami. Saroj Dey has directed under his own name was the film called Kony, which was released in 1984 and earned the National Film Award for Best Popular Film Providing Wholesome Entertainment at the 32nd National Film Awards. He died on 26 November 1997.

== Filmography ==
- Je Jekhane Dariye (1974)
- Kony (1984)
- Nisithe (1963)
- Daak Harkara (1958)
- Sagarika (1956)
- Shilpi (1956)
- Headmaster (1958)
- Kanna (1962)
- Sankha Bela (1966)
- Bilambita Lay (1970)
- Swati (1977)

== Awards ==
- Nisithe (1963) For certificate of Merit for Second Best Feature Film in Bengali.
- National Film Award for Best Popular Film Providing Wholesome Entertainment at the 32nd National Film Awards in 1984 for Kony.
- Invited to Venice Film Festival.
