= Being Human Foundation =

Charitable foundation in India founded by Salman Khan

- Founded: 2007; 19 years ago
- Founder: Salman Khan
- Type: Education and healthcare for underprivileged
- Purpose: Underprivileged children
- Location: Mumbai
- Region served: India
- Products: Clothing, watches and jewellery
- Services: Education, employment and medical treatment
- Method: Direct training, funding medical treatment, supplies for disabled people
- Owner: Salman Khan
- Website: www.beinghumanonline.com

The Being Human Foundation is a Mumbai-based charity, founded by Bollywood star Salman Khan in 2007, that provides education and healthcare services for the underprivileged in India. The organization is primarily funded by sales of Being Human-branded merchandise, which amounted the profit of approximately ₹120 crore up until August 2018 out of which the charity's share was ₹12-15 crore.

The foundation performs many charitable activities. It funds the education of 200 children at the Akshara High School in Mumbai and another 300 through Aseema, a Mumbai-based non-profit. The foundation supports the VEER Initiative, a program to train disabled people. Being human store has a provision to employ at least one person with disabilities. As of December 2015, the program has trained 1909 individuals, 1194 of whom have gained employment. The organization has set up programs to improve basic skills for students and career development centers.

Being Human has provided funding to treat children with congenital heart defects by partnering with Fortis Foundation and craniofacial deformities. It has provided drought relief in Maharashtra and blankets for flood victims in Kashmir, conducted free eye camps to provide cataract surgeries, and helped conduct bone-marrow donor registration camps in Mumbai.

In 2017, the Municipal Corporation of Greater Mumbai threatened to blacklist the foundation for failing to set up dialysis machines in Bandra. The project was a public-private partnership where the municipal government would provide the space while the foundation was to maintain and staff the low-cost dialysis facility. The foundation's representative denied that the organization signed any formal contract with the civic body.

== Education ==
1. Akshara High School
2. Aseema
3. Career Development Centers
4. Educational Resource Center, Maharashtra
5. Banashthali vidyapith jaipur rajashthan
6. Maharashtra Prabodhan Seva Mandal (MPSM)
7. Theatre And Drama #Initiative
8. Being Bajrangi
9. Brillant School of Science
10. Tubelight Project

== Partners ==
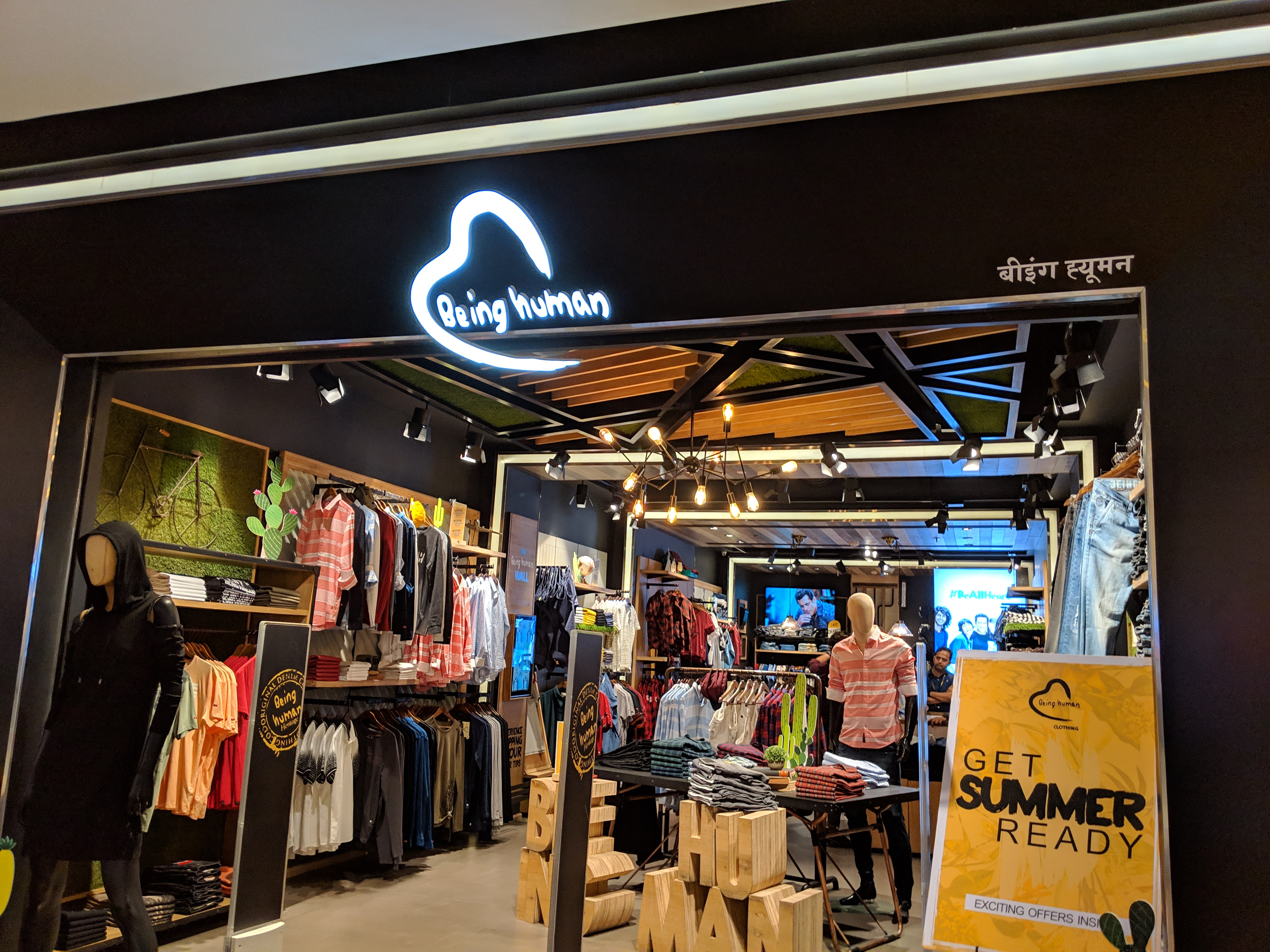
One of the Being Human stores in Mumbai

1. Akshara High School
2. Aseema
3. Maaya Foundation
4. Marrow Donor Registry, India
5. Hardik Sethi
6. The Max Foundation
7. Maharashtra Prabodhan Seva Mandal

== Funding ==
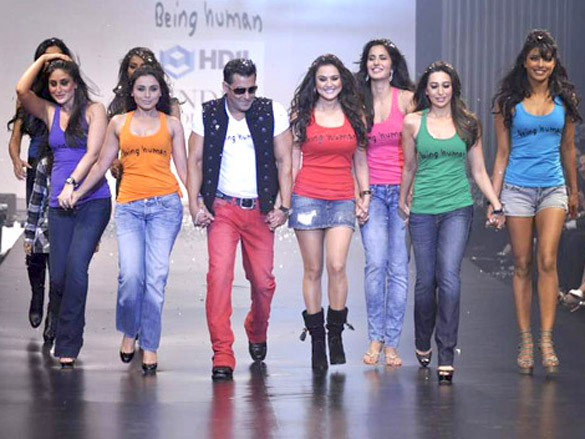
Salman Khan's Being Human show at HDIL India Couture Week (c. 2010)

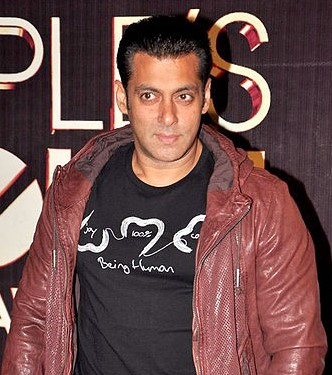
Founder Salman Khan in Being Human merchandise

The Organisation designed "Little Hearts Programme", which was aimed at helping children below the poverty line and till July 2015, there were 849 surgeries funded through this programme. The Being Human Foundation programme also have an revenue sharing model understanding with a private company to fund its programmes, and according to this it gets 5.75 percent share from the sale of tees, women's wear, kid's wear, jewellery, flip flops and electric bikes getting sold under "Being Human" brand. The foundation partnered with non-profit Akshara high school, NGO Asseem, and Maharastra prabodhan Seva Mandal to provide free education directly to 500 children and indirectly to 4000 children. The organisation also funds career development centres along with NIIT and Coca-Cola, in addition to financing educational resource centres across Zilla Parishads in Maharastra. The charity accepts direct donations, but it is primarily funded by 8 to 10% share of the sales of Being Human-branded clothing, manufactured and marketed by Mandhana Industries, as a licensing fee for the use of charity's name as brand. The charity's share in 2016 was approximately INR3 crore from the sales revenue of nearly INR30 crore. A quarter of the brand's revenue comes from overseas sales and a tenth of the revenue comes from online sales.

On June 23, 2017, PVR Cinemas announced a partnership with the foundation, allowing its customers to donate two rupees whenever purchasing a movie ticket.

== Brand ==
In the year 2009, at HDIL Couture week 2009, Being Human Foundation under Salman Khan launched its own brand, supported by lot of Bollywood personalities, through a tie up with Cotton $ Linen Clothing major Cottonworld and T shirts were sold at offline stores and BookMyShow website. Similarly, the watches brand were sold under beinghumanwatches.com. In year 2011 the foundation tied up with Mandhana Retail Ventures Limited(MRVL) till 2028 to design, manufacture, retail, market and distribute globally all "Being Human" retail merchandise. Being Human brand as on year 2017 has presence across 15 countries with more than 600 points of sale and exclusive stores in 45 cities across India and sells its products through shop-in-shops, distributor networks and online portals like Myntra. Tie up of Foundation with MRVL also helped its entry to Tier 2 and Tier 3 cities. Currently, Being Human brand is also famous in West Asia and France and is being sold in 256 points and has an exclusive deal with The Landmark Group for its West Asia business. In the year 2016-17 MRVL under "Being Human" brand reported sale of Rs 216 crores, with net profit of Rs 20.02 crore as per its Balance Sheet.
