= Salman Khan =

Indian actor and film producer (born 1965)

- Khan in 2023
- Born: 27 December 1965 (age 60); Indore, Madhya Pradesh, India
- Occupations: Actor; film producer; television presenter
- Years active: 1988–present
- Works: Full list
- Parents: Salim Khan (father); Helen (step-mother)
- Relatives: Sohail Khan (brother); Arbaaz Khan (brother); Alvira Khan Agnihotri (sister)
- Family: Salim Khan family
- Awards: Full list

Salman Khan (Note: Khan's full legal name has been reported and recorded as both "Abdul Rashid Salim Salman Khan" and "Salman Salim Khan".) (pronounced [səlˈmaːn xaːn]; born 27 December 1965) is an Indian actor, film producer, and television personality who works primarily in Hindi cinema. In a career spanning over three decades, his awards include two National Film Awards as a film producer, and two Filmfare Awards as an actor. He has acted in over 80 films. He has been cited as one of the most popular and commercially successful actors of Indian cinema, and was included in Forbes lists of the world's highest-paid celebrities in 2015 and 2018. Khan has a large following in India and among the Indian diaspora worldwide. His popularity has been particularly associated with commercially successful Hindi-language films, with his work spanning genres including action, comedy, romance and drama.

Khan began his acting career with a supporting role in Biwi Ho To Aisi (1988), followed by his breakthrough with a leading role in Sooraj Barjatya's romantic drama Maine Pyar Kiya (1989), for which he was awarded the Filmfare Award for Best Male Debut. He established himself with other commercially successful films, including Lawrence D'Souza's romantic drama Saajan (1991), Barjatya's family dramas Hum Aapke Hain Koun..! (1994) and Hum Saath-Saath Hain (1999), the action film Karan Arjun (1995) and the comedy Biwi No.1 (1999). This followed a period of decline in romantic comedy, musicals and tragedy drama in the 2000s. Khan resurrected his screen image with the action film Wanted (2009), and achieved greater stardom in the following decade by starring in the top-grossing action films Dabangg (2010), Bodyguard (2011), Ek Tha Tiger (2012), Dabangg 2 (2012), Kick (2014), and Tiger Zinda Hai (2017), and the dramas Bajrangi Bhaijaan (2015) and Sultan (2016). This was followed by a series of poorly received films which failed critically and commercially, with the exception of Bharat (2019) and Tiger 3 (2023). Khan has starred in the annual highest-grossing Hindi films of 10 individual years, the highest for any actor.

In addition to his acting career, Khan is a television presenter and promotes humanitarian causes through his charity, Being Human Foundation. He has been hosting the reality show Bigg Boss since 2010. Khan's off-screen life is marred by controversy and legal troubles. In 2015, he was convicted of culpable homicide for a negligent driving case in which he ran over five people with his car, killing one, but his conviction was set aside on appeal. On 5 April 2018, Khan was convicted in a blackbuck poaching case and sentenced to five years imprisonment. On 7 April 2018, he was out on bail while an appeal was ongoing.

== Early life and ancestry ==
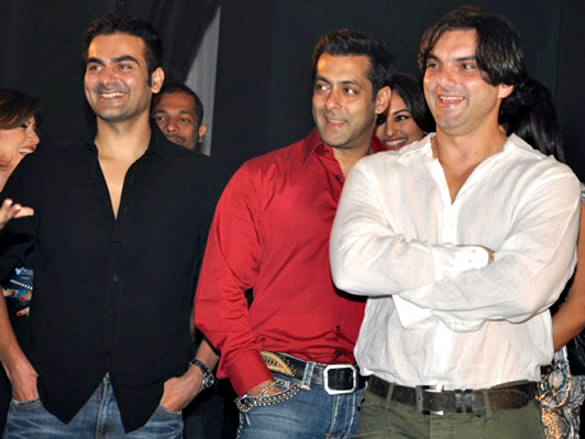
Salman Khan (between) with brothers Arbaaz Khan (left) and Sohail Khan (right)

Khan is the eldest son of screenwriter Salim Khan (born 24 November 1935) and his first wife Sushila Charak, who adopted the name Salma (born 8 December 1942); they had got married on 18 November 1964. Born to a Muslim father and Hindu mother on 27 December 1965, Salman Khan was brought up in both faiths. In 1981, when Salim married the actress Helen (born 21 November 1938) the children's relationship with their father grew hostile and only recovered years later.

According to Salim, his paternal great-grandparents are Alakozai Pashtuns from Afghanistan who immigrated to Indore State, Indore Residency (now in Madhya Pradesh), British India in the mid-1800s; however, author Jasim Khan in his biography of the actor states that his ancestors belonged to the Akuzai sub-tribe of the Yusufzai Pashtuns from Malakand in the Swat Valley of North-West Frontier Province, British India (present-day Khyber Pakhtunkhwa, Pakistan). His grandfather Abdul Rashid Khan was a Deputy Inspector General of the Indore state who was awarded the Diler Jung award of the Holkar times. Khan's mother is a homemaker, whose father Baldev Singh Charak, a Dogra Rajput, comes from Jammu in Jammu and Kashmir and whose Maratha mother comes from Maharashtra. Khan can also speak Marathi, in addition to Hindi and English. He has two brothers, Arbaaz Khan and Sohail Khan; and two sisters, Alvira Khan Agnihotri, who is married to actor-director Atul Agnihotri, and an adopted sister Arpita, who is married to actor Aayush Sharma.

Khan did his primary schooling at the Scindia School in Fort, Gwalior along with his brother Arbaaz. Later he shifted to St. Stanislaus High School in Bandra, Mumbai, as did his younger brothers Arbaaz and Sohail for their higher secondary education. He attended St. Xavier's College in Mumbai but dropped out.

== Career ==
=== 1988–1991: Debut and breakthrough ===
Salman Khan made his on-screen debut in 1988 with a supporting role in the successful film Biwi Ho To Aisi, which had Rekha in the lead role. The following year, he played the lead in Sooraj Barjatya's romantic musical Maine Pyar Kiya opposite Bhagyashree. The film backed up with chartbuster music went on to become an All Time Blockbuster at the box office and made Khan a star. Sukanya Verma called, "Dil deewana appears first [to] celebrate Khan and Bhagyashree's happily-ever-after aspirations in Maine Pyar Kiya and once again when standard rich versus poor conflicts threaten its realisation." It also won him the Filmfare Award for Best Male Debut.

He began the new decade with Deepak Shivdasani's action drama film Baaghi: A Rebel for Love (1990), which he also wrote. Baaghi opened to positive critical reception and was a box office hit. Khan's run continued in 1991 with his solo venture Sanam Bewafa and his parallel lead role in the Sanjay Dutt starrer Saajan, emerging as hits and their soundtracks proving to be two of the best-selling Hindi film albums of that year. His other releases of the year, Kurbaan and Patthar Ke Phool also performed well commercially.

=== 1992–1996: Major success and slump ===
In 1992, Khan starred in the dark fantasy horror film Suryavanshi, which was a major commercial and critical failure. The film is remembered for Khan's look which was inspired by Thor and He-Man. In 1994, Khan appeared in Rajkumar Santoshi's Andaz Apna Apna, co-starring Aamir Khan. At the time of its release, the film was a failure at the box office but has gained a cult status over the years. Later in the year he collaborated with director Sooraj Barjatya in the romance Hum Aapke Hain Koun..! co-starring Madhuri Dixit. During the 1995 awards season, the film won 3 Filmfare Awards for Best Film, Best Director and Best Actress. It also won the National Film Award for being the most popular film of the year. Earning more than ₹2 billion ($63.8 million) worldwide, the film became the biggest Bollywood hit of the year and the highest-grossing Indian film up until then. It is one of the films on Box Office India's list of "Biggest Blockbusters Ever in Hindi Cinema". In 2006, it was still the fourth-highest grossing Bollywood film ever, according to Box Office India.

In 1995 he starred in Rakesh Roshan's Karan Arjun alongside Shah Rukh Khan. The two played brothers who are reincarnated after being killed by family enemies. His role as Karan earned him a nomination for the 1995 Filmfare Best Actor Award. In 1996, Khan performed in Sanjay Leela Bhansali's directional debut Khamoshi: The Musical. Despite the massive success of Hum Aapke Hain Koun and Karan Arjun, his solo films entered a consistent slump. Projects like Andaz Apna Apna (1994), Sangdil Sanam (1994), Veergati (1995), Majhdhaar (1996) and Khamoshi (1996) all underperformed at the box office. His career was eventually revitalised by the 1996 film Jeet starring Sunny Deol, which became the third highest-grossing film of the year. Khan has often credited Deol for supporting him during the period. He later reciprocated by supporting Deol's brother, Bobby Deol, with a role in Race 3.

=== 1997–1999: Rise to prominence ===
He had two releases in 1997: Judwaa and Auzaar. The former was a comedy directed by David Dhawan where he played a dual role of twins separated at birth. Khan worked in five different films in 1998, his first release being the romantic comedy film Pyaar Kiya To Darna Kya opposite Kajol, one of the biggest commercial successes of that year. This was followed by the moderately successful drama Jab Pyaar Kisise Hota Hai where Khan played a young man who has to take a child who claims to be his son, under his custody. Khan's performance in the film earned favourable critical review. He also had an extended cameo in Karan Johar's directorial debut, Kuch Kuch Hota Hai, which earned him critical acclaim and a second Filmfare Award under the Best Supporting Actor category.

In 1999, Khan starred in three films: Hum Saath-Saath Hain, Biwi No.1, and Hum Dil De Chuke Sanam alongside Aishwarya Rai and Ajay Devgan, which earned him another Best Actor nomination at the Filmfare awards. His performance in the film was reviewed favourably, with Sharmila Telikum of Rediff noting, "Salman is endearing. He does tend to ham in the dramatic scenes, but looks very comfortable doing comedy and those romantic scenes."

=== 2000–2009: Sporadic success and career setbacks ===
Despite some big successes, some of Khan's films were critical and commercial Average Grossers during this period, including Chal Mere Bhai (2000), Kahin Pyaar Na Ho Jaaye (2000), Tumko Na Bhool Paayenge (2002), Yehi Hai Jalwa (2002), Garv: Pride & Honour (2004), Phir Milenge (2004), Dil Ne Jise Apna Kahaa (2004), Lucky - No Time for Love (2005), Kyon Ki (2005), Shaadi Karke Phas Gaya Yaar (2006), Jaan-E-Mann (2006), Baabul (2006), Salaam-E-Ishq (2007), God Tussi Great Ho (2008), Yuvvraaj (2008), Main Aurr Mrs. Khanna (2009), London Dreams (2009), and Veer (2010). While films like Har Dil Jo Pyar Karega (2000), Chori Chori Chupke Chupke (2001), Hum Tumhare Hain Sanam (2002), , Tere Naam (2003), and Maine Pyaar Kyun Kiya? (2005) were moderately successful, his major hits included Dulhan Hum Le Jayenge (2000), Baghban (2003), Mujhse Shaadi Karogi (2004), No Entry (2005), Partner (2007), and Wanted (2009).

In 2001, Khan appeared in Chori Chori Chupke Chupke, which addressed the issue of surrogate childbirth. In it, Khan played the role of a rich industrialist who hires a surrogate mother after his wife becomes infertile. Sukanya Verma of Rediff.com wrote that the film had an absurd storyline, but also spontaneous performances from the cast, helping to minimise its other flaws. In 2002, he starred in Hum Tumhare Hain Sanam. For Tere Naam (2003), Taran Adarsh said of him, "Salman Khan is exceptional in a role that fits him to the T. He breathes fire in sequences that demand uneasiness. But beneath the tough exterior lies a vulnerable person and this facet in particular comes to the fore in the latter reels. His emotional outbursts are splendid..." Director Satish Kaushik considered Khan's work in the film to be strong, saying of it, "Salman has given a great performance in the film. He's given an intense, unconventional performance. I believe this is the best performance of Salman's career so far." His career progressed with comedies like Mujhse Shaadi Karogi (2004) and No Entry (2005).

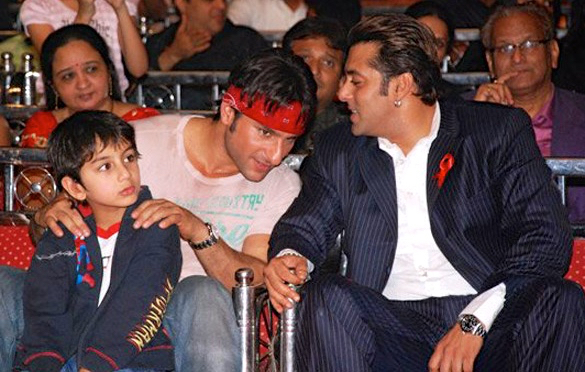
Khan (right) with Saif Ali Khan at an event for World Aids Day in 2007

Khan started 2007 with the ensemble film Salaam-e-Ishq which was termed as an "Average Grosser All Over". He appeared in the Hollywood movie Marigold, opposite American actress Ali Larter. The film told the love story of an Indian man and an American woman. Khan hosted the second season of the game show 10 Ka Dum during 2009. According to a 2008 report from Biz Asia UK, the show earned enough target rating points (TRPs) for Sony Entertainment Television to regain its third position in the Indian television ratings. He appeared in Wanted (a remake of 2006 Telugu super hit film Pokiri), directed by choreographer turned director Prabhu Deva. The film received mixed reviews. Taran Adarsh from Bollywood Hungama rated it 4 of 5 stars noting, "Wanted rides on Salman Khan's star power. He may not be the best actor in town, but in a film like Wanted, in a role that seems like an extension of his personality, you can't think of anyone else enacting this role with flourish." Raja Sen from Rediff gave a rating of 2/5 and said, "The writing is both amateurish and crass, while the songs are plain hideous...Khan might be having fun, but the fact a film like Wanted underscores is how badly Bollywood needs a breed of younger leading men. And how the existing lot need roles that fit." He appeared in two other films that year, Main Aurr Mrs Khanna and London Dreams.

=== 2010–2017: Commercial peak ===
Khan's first release of 2010 was Anil Sharma's film Veer. In his second release of 2010, Dabangg, Khan played the role of a fearless cop with comic effect in the film. The film was noted by the Economic Times as being remarkable for its commercial success, despite having an "accent on inanity..." and "...complete incoherence in terms of plot and credibility." The Times also noted industry experts attributed the popularity of the film to Khan's presence, stating that they "ascribe its allure to the star charisma of Salman Khan, who has managed to carry off the over-the-top articulation of Chulbul Pandey with unbridled enthusiasm and zeal."

Dabangg won several awards, including the National Film Award for Best Popular Film Providing Wholesome Entertainment. It was later remade in Tamil and Telugu. The film was produced by his brother Arbaaz Khan. It was reported by the Hindustan Times that the film opened to full houses across the country. Khan received a Star Screen Award for Best Actor and a Stardust Award for Star of the Year – Male for his performance. He was also nominated for his sixth Filmfare Award for Best Actor. Anupama Chopra from NDTV wrote about his performance: "It's the role of a lifetime and Salman Khan bites into it like a starving man devours a feast. He inhabits it fully, strutting and swaggering and even, spoofing himself." Beginning with Dabangg, Khan entered a period of sustained commercial dominance through a streak of box office successes. Between 2010 and 2017, every film in which he played the lead role grossed over ₹100 crore domestically. During this eight-year period, Khan headlined the highest-grossing Hindi film of the year on five occasions. His film releases became synonymous with the Eid festival, where they broke multiple opening-day and lifetime collection records, cementing his status as one of the most consistently bankable stars in the industry.

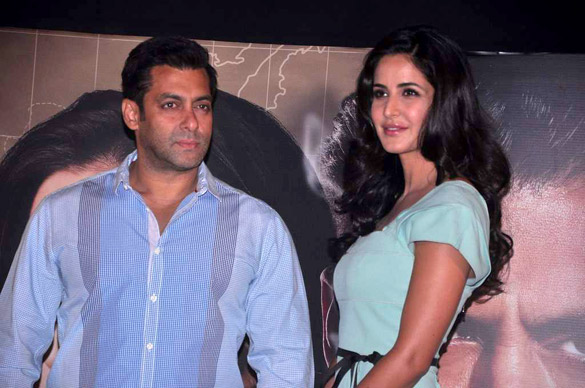
Khan with Katrina Kaif at the launch of Ek Tha Tiger's first song 'Mashallah'

Khan's first release of 2011 was Ready (a remake of the 2008 Telugu film of the same name). Ready held a record for being the second highest grossing Bollywood film of 2011. He next appeared in Bodyguard, a remake of the 2010 Malayalam film of the same name. The film was not well received by critics, though it became India's highest-earning film of the year. Khan's first release of 2012 was Ek Tha Tiger where he starred opposite Katrina Kaif and acted as an Indian spy. The film garnered positive reactions from critics while opening to extremely strong box office collections. The film marks his first association with Yash Raj Films. Khan starred in Dabangg 2, the sequel of Dabangg, in 2012 under the production of Arbaaz Khan. Dabangg 2 eventually emerged as a huge financial success with revenues of ₹2.5 billion (US$46.78 million) globally. After a one-year gap, Khan's first release of 2014 was Jai Ho (an official remake of the 2006 Telugu film Stalin), which he starred in opposite Daisy Shah. The film became another box office success for Khan. His second release, Kick, a remake of a Telugu film entered the Rs. 2 billion club in India on Eid. He also sang the song "Hangover" for the film's soundtrack.

The year 2015 is widely considered the pinnacle of Khan's film career. Khan's first film of 2015, Bajrangi Bhaijaan, which was released on Eid, received acclaim from critics and the public and broke several box office records upon release. The film, grossing ₹1.84 billion (US$28.68 million) on its first week beat the previous record of PK. This was Khan's first and the second Bollywood film after PK to enter the 300 club. The film became the second highest-grossing Bollywood film in India and worldwide at that time, with a collection of over 6 billion. Bajrangi Bhaijaan crossed 300 crore within 20 days of its release and became the second highest grosser to date in India, while his second film, Prem Ratan Dhan Payo, a Diwali release which received mixed reviews from critics and the public, broke several box office records upon release. The film became the ninth consecutive film of Salman Khan to gross over 1 billion. The film grossed ₹1.73 billion (US$27 million) on its first week. By 25 November, the film collected ₹2.01 billion. With this, Khan become the only actor to give three back-to-back movies which collected more than ₹2 billion (US$31.18 million) net domestically. He became the only actor to collect over ₹5 billion (US$77.94 million) domestic net in a single year in India.

Khan's first film of 2016, yet again another Eid release, Sultan, directed by Ali Abbas Zafar for Yash Raj Films received positive reviews from both critics and the public breaking several box office records. The film opened on an average of 70% audience occupancy and grossed approximately ₹365 million (US$5.43 million) on its opening day. The film also collected another ₹74.86 (US$1.11) on its first weekend, bringing its total first week collections to an approximate of ₹2.08 billion (US$30.95 million). By the end of its second week, the film had grossed an estimated ₹2.78 billion (US$41.37 million) and later became the second film of Khan to net over 300 crores. As of 9 August, the film grossed ₹5.83 billion (US$86.76 million) worldwide. In June 2017, Khan appeared in Tubelight, his third collaboration with Kabir Khan after Ek Tha Tiger and Bajrangi Bhaijaan. This film also starred Khan's real-life brother Sohail Khan. Despite its high expectations, the film didn't to do that much no.s at the box office just like his previous movies but still emerged as commercial success . Khan's second release of 2017 Tiger Zinda Hai, a sequel to Ek Tha Tiger grossed ₹190 crore worldwide in its opening weekend. As of 23 January 2018, the film has grossed ₹5.52 billion (US$84.76 million) worldwide, including ₹4.28 billion (US$65.72 million) in India and ₹1.23 billion (US$18.89 million) overseas.

=== 2018–present: Career fluctuations ===
In 2018, Khan played the leading role in his only release of the year, Race 3, an action film. The film had an ensemble cast including Anil Kapoor, Bobby Deol, Jacqueline Fernandez and others. The film was critically panned for its storyline, weak performances and climax but became an average grosser commercially. The following year, Khan starred in Bharat and Dabangg 3. While Bharat was moderately successful, Dabangg 3 emerged as a flop In 2021, he starred in Radhe, which released on 13 May 2021 to widespread negative reviews, however, it became a streaming success. In the same year, he starred in Antim: The Final Truth. The film received mixed reviews from the critics, but Khan's performance was praised. In 2023, he did a cameo in Pathaan, reprising his eponymous role as Tiger. The same year, he starred in Kisi Ka Bhai Kisi Ki Jaan, the remake of Veeram, directed by Farhad Samji. The film received mixed reviews and did average business. Khan next reprised his role as Tiger in Tiger 3 (2023), as part of the YRF Spy Universe. Made on a budget of ₹300 crore (US$32 million), the movie went on to gross over ₹466.63 crore (US$50 million) worldwide to emerge a hit venture. Despite the success, Tiger 3 underperformed compared to its prequels.

After making cameos in Singham Again and Baby John in 2024, Khan starred in AR Murugadoss' action film Sikandar in 2025. Chirag Segal of News18 praised Khan's action sequences and chemistry with Rashmika Mandanna, who is 31 years his junior, but noted his limited emotional range in dramatic scenes. Rahul Desai of The Hollywood Reporter was critical of the movie and Khan's performance as "alpha-male-saviour", stating that "Khan's version of reality is too detached from storytelling to affect the viewers.". Overall, the film received negative reviews from the critics and became Khan's biggest flop since Yuvvraaj (2008).

Khan will next appear in a film about the 2020 Galwan Valley clash between Indian and Chinese troops, Maatrubhumi: May War Rest in Peace, playing the role of Colonel B. Santosh Babu alongside Chitrangda Singh; it was originally going to be called Battle of Galwan.

== Other work ==
=== Production ===
In 2011, he launched his own production company called SKBH Productions (Salman Khan Being Human Productions). Money generated from film productions will be donated to the Being Human organisation. The first film made under the banner was the kids' entertainer Chillar Party, which went on to win 3 National Awards for Best Children's Film, Best Original Screenplay and Best Child Artist(s). Khan has been the brand ambassador of BMC's Open Defecation Free drive since 2016.

=== Salman Khan Films ===
In 2014, he launched another production house called SKF (Salman Khan Films). The first film released under this banner was the Canadian film Dr. Cabbie. The film earned $350,452 on its opening day at the box office. The next films under this banner were Hero, in which he also sang the title song "Hero" by Nikhil Advani, which starred Aditya Pancholi's son Suraj Pancholi and Sunil Shetty's daughter Athiya Shetty; and Bajrangi Bhaijaan by Kabir Khan starring Khan himself with Kareena Kapoor and Nawazuddin Siddiqui.

Films produced under Salman Khan FilmsKey: † / Denotes films that have not yet been released
Year	Title	Director	Notes
2011	Chillar Party	Nitesh Tiwari, Vikas Bahl	Produced with the banner Salman Khan Being Human Productions. It won the 2011 National Film Award for Best Children's Film. Along with this, it also won 2011 National Film Award for Best Child Artist and Best Screenplay (Original).
2014	Dr. Cabbie	Jean-François Pouliot	
2015	Bajrangi Bhaijaan	Kabir Khan	National Film Award for Best Popular Film Providing Wholesome Entertainment
2015	Hero	Nikhil Advani	Remake of Hero
2017	Tubelight	Kabir Khan	Adaptation of Little Boy
2018	Race 3	Remo D'Souza	
2018	Loveyatri	Abhiraj Minawala	Unofficial remake of Devadasu
2019	Notebook	Nitin Kakkar	Adaptation of The Teacher's Diary
2019	Bharat	Ali Abbas Zafar	Adaptation of Ode to My Father
2019	Dabangg 3	Prabhu Deva	
2021	Kaagaz	Satish Kaushik	Based on Lal Bihari "Mritak"
2021	Radhe	Prabhu Deva	Adaptation of The Outlaws
2021	Antim: The Final Truth	Mahesh Manjrekar	Remake of Mulshi Pattern
2023	Kisi Ka Bhai Kisi Ki Jaan	Farhad Samji	Remake of Veeram
2023	Farrey	Soumendra Padhi	Remake of Bad Genius
2025	Sikandar	AR Murugadoss	
2026	Maatrubhumi: May War Rest in Peace †	Apoorva Lakhia	Based on Shiv Aroor "India's Most Fearless"

=== Television ===
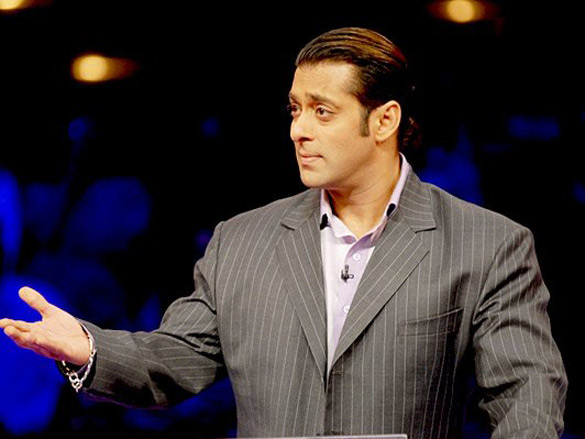
Khan hosting 10 Ka Dum.

In 2008 Khan hosted 10 Ka Dum. The show was extremely popular and was at the number one spot in ratings in India. It garnered an average TVR of 2.81 and a peak rating of 4.5, leaving behind Shahrukh Khan's Kya Aap Paanchvi Paas Se Tej hai? with an average rating of 1.37 TVR and a peak rating of 2.3 and Hrithik Roshan's Junoon – Kuch Kar Dikhane Ka on NDTV Imagine with an average TVR of 0.76 and a peak rating of 1.1. According to reports, the show helped Sony TV regain its third position in the Indian television ratings. He again hosted the show in 2009 and thus won the Best Anchor Award for 10 Ka Dum in 2008 and 2009. In 2010 Khan hosted Bigg Boss 4. The show was widely accepted and appreciated due to Khan's hosting and surpassed the famous hosting of Amitabh Bachchan.

The Grand Finale episode on 8 January 2011, received a TRP of 6.7, which was the highest among the finales of other Indian reality shows such as Kaun Banega Crorepati, Rahul Dulhaniya Le Jayega, MasterChef and DID –Li'l Masters. Due to high TRP Khan again hosted Bigg Boss 5 along with Sanjay Dutt in 2011 and because of huge acceptance he also hosted Bigg Boss 6 and Bigg Boss 7 in 2012 and 2013. In 2013 Khan hosted the Star Guild Award for the first time. Khan also hosted Bigg Boss 8, Bigg Boss 9, Bigg Boss 10, Bigg Boss 11, Bigg Boss 12, Bigg Boss 13, Bigg Boss 14, Bigg Boss 15, Bigg Boss 16. Bigg Boss 17, Bigg Boss 18, Bigg Boss 19

=== Brand endorsements ===
Khan was associated as a brand when he had advertised for Campa Cola, Limca Soft drink, Hero Honda bikes and Double Bull shirts well before he entered the film Industry. Even after he became a superstar, he never showed interest in promoting himself as a brand, but he was signed for Thums Up in 2002 and continued until its contract was over. Later, Akshay Kumar replaced Khan. Later, he was the brand ambassador of the soft drink Mountain Dew with whom he ended the contract in December 2010, and he has once again promoted Thums Up but ended contract soon after. He is now brand ambassador for Pepsi. He has also become the brand ambassador for the travel website, Yatra, which also made him a shareholder. He is also the face of the History Channel and the new brand ambassador for Suzuki motorcycles, Previously he endorsed Red Tape Shoes, and now he is endorsing Relaxo Hawaii. Khan is also the brand ambassador of the detergent brand Wheel. He has also appeared for Chlormint, a brand of gum, with his brother Sohail Khan. The actor has also done a jewellery brand, Sangini with Kareena Kapoor. Apart from innerwear brand Dixcy Scott and tablet BlackBerry Playbook, Britannia's Tiger biscuits is the latest endorsement of Salman. He is also the face of Ranbaxy's Revital, replacing Yuvraj Singh. Apart from these brands, he also has Rotomac Pen and SF Sonic Batteries endorsements. Now Khan has been roped in as the brand ambassador of Dubai-based fashion label Splash, and has been also signed as the brand ambassador for Astral Limited the leading manufacturers of plumbing and drainage systems in the country. Khan is also the brand ambassador of civic body Bombay Municipal Corporation's (BMC) drive against open defecation in Mumbai, and has been also signed by the Security and Surveillance brand, CP PLUS as their CCTV ambassador. Khan is now the second Ambassador along with Amitabh Bachchan for 'Emami Healthy & Tasty', 'Himani Best Choice' and 'Rasoi', apart from 'Bake Magic'.

=== Business ===
The renowned Bollywood actor, made a significant investment in the property sector in 2012 when he purchased a commercial property on Linking Road for approximately 120 Crore Indian rupee. In 2017, the property gained prominence as it became the location for Future Retail's Food Hall, which was owned by Kishore Biyani's Future Group. An agreement was struck for a monthly rental of 80 Lakh Indian Rupees over a five-year period. However, due to non-payment of dues, a legal dispute arose, ultimately resulting in a ruling by the National Company Law Appellate Tribunal (NCLAT) in favour of Salman Khan. Fast forward to 2023, and the property has found new occupants in the form of Food Square, a luxury gourmet retail brand owned by LandCraft Retail Private Limited. The co-founders of Food Square, Lalit Jhawar and Mayank Gupta, successfully secured $3.6 million in funding from notable investors, including Masaba Gupta, Mukul Agrawal, Purple Style Labs, Sanket Parekh (from the Pidilite Family), Rahul Kayan (SMIFS), and Harminder Sahni. Food Square now rents out the Salman Khan-owned property for a monthly fee of 1 Crore Indian Rupees, marking a new chapter in the property's history.

== Philanthropy and service ==
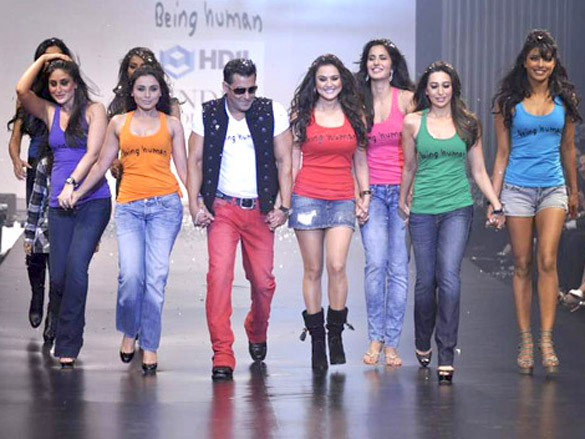
Khan at his Being Human show with actresses, (l-r) Kareena Kapoor, Rani Mukerji, Preity Zinta, Katrina Kaif, Karisma Kapoor and Priyanka Chopra

Khan has been involved in several charities during his career. He has started an NGO called Being Human which sells T-shirts and other products online and in stores. A portion of the revenues go to a worthy cause supporting the underprivileged. Being Human Foundation is a registered charitable trust set up by Khan to help the underprivileged. In its early days, Khan set up and funded the Foundation using his own money. The Foundation has two focus areas: education and healthcare. To increase the reach and corpus of the Foundation, Salman Khan has undertaken initiatives such as Being Human Art, Being Human merchandise and Being Human Gitanjali Gold Coins.

In 2011, he launched his own production company called SKBH Productions (Salman Khan Being Human Productions). Money which will be generated from film productions will be donated to Being Human. The first film made under the banner was the kids' entertainer Chillar Party, which went on to win 3 National Awards for Best Children's film, Best Original Screenplay and Child Artist's Award.

In January 2012, Khan offered to pay ₹4 million (US$74,853.66) to release about 400 prisoners from about 63 prisons in the state of Uttar Pradesh via his NGO. The prisoners had completed their terms, but due to economic reasons, they were unable to pay legal fines for their charges.

In July 2015, Khan offered to donate the profits of his most successful film Bajrangi Bhaijaan to poor farmers all over India. The film's producers Khan and Rockline Venkatesh both have mutually decided to donate the profits of their film to them. The film's director Kabir Khan and Salman's sister Alvira Agnihotri met Maharashtra's Revenue Minister Eknath Khadse to discuss the same.

Khan met with his 11-year-old fan from Pakistan, Abdul Basit who had severe jaundice at the time of his birth; he was diagnosed to have Crigler Najjar syndrome and was admitted to the Apollo Hospital, Delhi. The youngster wished to meet the "Bajrangi Bhaijaan" star Khan.

Khan was one of the nine personalities invited by India's Prime Minister Narendra Modi to promote the message of cleanliness and Swachh Bharat Abhiyan when it was launched on 2 October 2014. In 2016, he agreed to campaign for cleanliness and eradicating open defecation for the Brihan Mumbai Municipal Corporation. His efforts to clean the streets of Karjat, a small town near Mumbai were appreciated by the Prime Minister in a tweet.

== Personal life ==
Khan resides in Galaxy Apartments, Bandra, Mumbai. He also has a 150-acre plot in Panvel which has 3 bungalows, a swimming pool and a gym. He is a fitness enthusiast and maintains a strict regimen.In June 2026, it was reported that the actor will be moving out of the Galaxy building after 52 years, after receiving approval to construct a new six-storey residence in Bandra.

Khan has never married. In 1999, he began dating Bollywood actress Aishwarya Rai; their relationship was often reported in the media until the couple separated in 2001. Khan started dating actress Katrina Kaif in 2003. After years of speculations, Kaif admitted in an interview in 2011 that she had been in a serious relationship with Khan for several years, but it ended in 2010. Sangeeta Bijlani and Somy Ali were also in serious relationships with Khan.

Since 2012, Khan is in a relationship with Romanian actress Iulia Vântur.

In August 2011, Khan admitted that he suffers from trigeminal neuralgia, a facial nerve disorder commonly known as the "suicide disease". The disorder occurs due to the inflammation of trigeminal nerve in the face. In an interview, he said that he has been quietly suffering from it for the past seven years, but now the pain has become unbearable. He said that it has even affected his voice, making it much harsher.

Khan identifies as both Muslim and Hindu, commenting that, "I'm Hindu and Muslim both. I'm Bharatiya (an Indian)". He explained, "My father is Muslim and my mother is Hindu".

== In the media ==
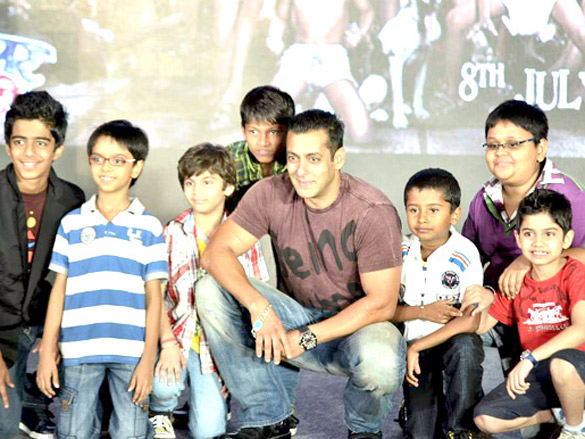
Salman Khan promoting his production venture Chillar Party

Salman Khan's name is often shortened to SK in the media, also reflected in the name of his gym brand "SK-27 Gym" and his film company SKF (Salman Khan Films). He is also known by his nickname "Bhai" or "Bhaijaan" (meaning brother), referenced in the title of his films Bajrangi Bhaijaan (2015) and Kisi Ka Bhai Kisi Ki Jaan (2023).

In 2004, Khan was ranked as the 7th Best looking man in the world by People Magazine of the USA. In 2008, his lifelike wax statue was installed in London's Madame Tussauds Museum; likewise, in 2012 another wax statue of him was installed in Madame Tussauds New York Museum. In 2010 People Magazine, India declared him the Sexiest Man Alive. In 2011, 2012, and 2013, he was declared the Times of India's Most Desirable Man in 2nd, 1st and 3rd place respectively. In August 2013, he was declared India's Most Searched Celebrity Online. Khan topped the Forbes India charts for 2014, in terms of both fame and revenues. According to the Forbes 2015 list 'Celebrity 100 : The World's Top-Paid Entertainers 2015', Khan was the highest ranked Indian in the 71st rank with earnings of $33.5 million.

Khan was ranked seventh in Forbes's first global list of highest-paid actors in the world, with earnings of US$33.5 million, which placed him higher than such Hollywood actors as Johnny Depp, Brad Pitt, Leonardo DiCaprio and Dwayne The Rock Johnson. In 2015, he was ranked ahead of US President Barack Obama in the list of The Most Admired Personalities of India. In September 2015, the International Business Times declared him "The Most Attractive Personality" in India. He also became the only actor to collect over ₹5 billion (US$77.94 million) domestic net in a single year in India. Khan was ranked the second "Most Googled Indian of 2015" and first among Bollywood actors. On 24 April 2016, the Indian Olympic Association appointed the actor as the Indian Olympic contingent's goodwill ambassador for the 2016 Summer Olympics. In August 2017, he was identified as the ninth highest-paid actor in the world, and the first place highest-paid in India according to Forbes India.

== Controversies ==
=== Hit-and-run case ===
On 28 September 2002, Khan was arrested for rash and negligent driving after his car ran into a bakery in Mumbai; one person who was sleeping on the pavement outside the bakery died and three others were injured in the accident. Charges of culpable homicide were laid against him, but later dropped. On 24 July 2013, he was formally charged with culpable homicide in the case, to which he pleaded not guilty.

On 6 May 2015, Khan was found guilty of all charges in the case. The Bombay Sessions Court concluded that Khan was driving the car under the influence of alcohol, causing the death of one and serious injury to four homeless people. An RTO officer confirmed that Khan did not have a driving licence until 2004. Sessions Judge DW Deshpande convicted the actor for culpable homicide not amounting to murder and sentenced him to five years in prison.

Later on the same day, the Bombay High Court suspended the sentence and granted bail to Khan. In December 2015, Khan was acquitted of all charges from this case due to lack of evidence.

The Supreme Court admitted an appeal filed by the Maharashtra government in July 2016 that challenged Khan's acquittal in this hit-and-run case by the Bombay High Court, but the court refused to fast-track the case.

In the course of the judicial proceedings, Khan's driver Ashok Singh, who had given the testimony that it was himself who was driving the car at the time of accident, was charged with perjury for misguiding the Court with false testimony and was arrested. The prime witness, police constable Ravindra Patil went missing multiple times and eventually died in a hospital due to tuberculosis.

=== Relationship with Aishwarya Rai ===
His relationship with actress Aishwarya Rai was a well publicised topic in the Indian media. After their break-up in March 2002, Rai accused him of harassing her. She claimed that Khan had not been able to come to terms with their break-up and was hounding her; her parents lodged a complaint against him. In 2003, Vivek Oberoi, Rai's then boyfriend, claimed that Khan had threatened him. In 2005, news outlets released what was said to be an illicit copy of a mobile phone call recorded in 2001 by the Mumbai police. It appeared to be a call in which he threatened Rai, in an effort to force her to appear at social events held by Mumbai crime figures. The call featured boasts of connections to organised crime and derogatory comments about other actors. However, the alleged tape was tested in the government's Forensic lab in Chandigarh, which concluded that it was fake.

=== Blackbuck hunting and Arms Act violations cases ===
The 1998 blackbuck poaching case involves the alleged killing of a deer when Khan and his co-stars – Saif Ali Khan, Sonali Bendre, Neelam and Tabu – were filming the movie Hum Saath-Saath Hain in the forests near Jodhpur in 1998. In 2007, Salman spent a week in Jodhpur jail before the court granted him bail. In addition to the accusations of poaching of endangered antelopes under the Wildlife (Protection) Act, a case under sections 3/25 and 3/27 of the Arms Act was filed against Khan for allegedly keeping and using firearms with an expired licence.

On 17 February 2006, Khan was sentenced to one year in prison for hunting Chinkara, an endangered species. The sentence was stayed by a higher court on appeal.

On 10 April 2006, Khan was handed a five-year jail term and remanded to Jodhpur jail until 13 April when he was granted bail. On 24 July 2012, Rajasthan High Court finalised charges against Khan and his other colleagues in the endangered blackbuck killing case, paving way for the start of the trial. On 9 July 2014, the Supreme Court issued a notice to Khan on Rajasthan government's plea challenging the High Court order suspending his conviction. Khan was acquitted in the blackbuck and chinkara poaching cases by the Rajasthan High Court on 24 July 2016.

On 18 October 2016 the Rajasthan Government decided to approach the Supreme Court to challenge Khan's acquittal in two related cases.

On 18 January 2017 Khan was acquitted by a Jodhpur court in an Arms Act case linked to the killing of a blackbuck in Rajasthan. Khan pleaded "not guilty" to charges of violating the law by keeping unlicensed weapons and using them. Acquitting the actor, the court said that the prosecution failed to submit enough evidence against him.

On 5 April 2018, Jodhpur court convicted Khan in the blackbuck poaching case and sentenced him to five years imprisonment while acquitting Saif Ali Khan, Sonali Bendre, Neelam, and Tabu.

Khan was released on bail on 7 April 2018, pending appeal.

On 14 April 2024, two members of the Bishnoi Gang, who belong a religious sect that considers the blackbuck sacred, opened fire on Khan's apartment in Bandra, Mumbai before fleeing on a motorcycle. Khan, who was inside along with several relatives, was unharmed. The gunmen were later arrested in Gujarat. The gang had previously threatened Khan over the hunting incident. Police said that the attack was masterminded by Anmol Bishnoi, the younger brother of the gang's leader Lawrence Bishnoi.

In June 2026, Khan sued the makers of the film, Kala Hiran: The Battle For Legacy, a film inspired by the case, alleging "gross violation of personality rights". Khan's lawyer stated that developing the proposed film amounts to "interference with the administration of justice and directly impinges upon our client's fundamental right to a fair trial". Khan had earlier sent a legal notice to the makers as well.

=== Remarks about 26/11 attacks ===
In September 2010, Khan was reported to have claimed during an interview on a Pakistani channel that the 26/11 attacks got a lot of attention because the "elite" were targeted. During the interview the actor had said: "It was the elite that was targeted this time. Five star hotels and stuff. So they panicked. Then they got up and spoke about it. My question is "why not before?" Attacks have happened in trains and small towns too, but no one talked about it so much." Khan also said that Pakistan was not to be blamed for it, and that the Indian security had failed. Khan's comments had drawn strong reactions from Deputy Chief Minister of Maharashtra Chhagan Bhujbal, Shiv Sena, BJP and other political parties. The comments were also condemned by Ujwal Nikam, Special Prosecutor in the 26/11 trial. Khan later apologised for his comments.

=== Tweets on Yakub Memon ===
On 25 July 2015, Khan made a number of tweets from his Twitter account in support of the 1993 Bombay bombings accused Yakub Memon. Memon was scheduled to be executed, before which Khan made his tweets. Khan said that Yakub's brother, Tiger Memon should be hanged instead. He also asked the Prime Minister of Pakistan, Nawaz Sharif to confirm "whether the mob boss is in his country." The tweets sparked protests outside his house where police had to be deployed and were criticised in the social media and by his father, Salim Khan. Following these incidents, Khan withdrew his tweets and apologised.

=== Interference in Jiah Khan suicide case ===
Following the death of Sushant Singh Rajput by hanging, the late actress Jiah Khan's mother, Rabia Amin, revealed that Salman Khan had attempted to influence the case, where accusations for abetment of suicide were charged against actor Sooraj Pancholi. A CBI officer who was investigating the case had told Rabia Amin that Salman Khan called him every day, asking him not to harass or touch Sooraj Pancholi, as a lot of money was invested in him.

=== Threats from Lawrence Bishnoi gang ===
Since 2022, Khan has been the target of repeated threats from the Lawrence Bishnoi gang, which has claimed hostility towards the actor due to his alleged involvement in the 1998 blackbuck poaching case, as the Bishnoi community regards the blackbuck as sacred.

On 14 April 2024, two men opened fire outside Khan’s residence, Galaxy Apartments, in Bandra, Mumbai. Khan, who was at home with his family, was unharmed. The shooters, later arrested in Gujarat, were alleged associates of Amnol Bishnoi, the brother of gang leader Lawrence Bishnoi.

In September 2024, Salman Khan addressed the threats publicly, remarking that life and death were in God’s hands and that security measures made his daily routine difficult.

In March 2025, a Bishnoi gang member warned that not only Khan but also anyone collaborating with him—actors, producers, or directors—would be targeted. The group also claimed responsibility for two attacks on comedian Kapil Sharma’s café in Surrey, Canada, alleging that he had invited Khan to his show.

=== Comments on Balochistan ===
On 16 October 2025, at the Joy Forum in Riyadh, Khan, in response to a question on the popularity of Indian cinema, commented "Right now, if you make a Hindi film and release it here (in Saudi Arabia), it will be a superhit. If you make a Tamil, Telugu, or Malayali film, it will do hundreds of crores in business because so many people from other countries have come here. There are people from Balochistan, there are people from Afghanistan, there are people from Pakistan... everyone is working here." While the statement was praised by several social media users and journalists for recognising the Baloch ethnic population, it did not go well with the Government of Pakistan, and sanctioned Khan under the 4th Schedule of the Anti-Terrorism Act (1997). However, the claim to label Khan as a terrorist under Pakistan's anti-terror laws has been unverified and false, after the Pakistani Ministry of Information and Broadcasting issued clarification.

== Discography ==
Khan has sung the following Hindi songs for Bollywood films:

List of Salman Khan film singing credits
Year	Title	Song	Notes	Ref.
1999	Hello Brother	"Chaandi Ke Daal Par"	Duet with Alka Yagnik	
2014	Kick	"Hai Yehi Zindagi" – Version 2		
2014	Kick	"Hangover"	Duet with Shreya Ghoshal	
2014	Kick	"Jumme Ki Raat Hai" – Version 2	Duet with Palak Muchhal	
2014	Kick	"Tu Hi Tu" – Version 2	Solo	
2015	Hero	"Main Hoon Hero Tera"	Solo	
2016	Sultan	"Baby Ko Bass Pasand Hai"	Solo	
2016	Sultan	"Jag Ghoomeya"	Solo	
2016	Sultan	"440 Volt"		
2016	Sultan	"Sultan"		
2018	Race 3	"I Found Love"		
2019	Notebook	"Main Taare"	Solo	
2019	Dabangg 3	"Yu Karke"	Duet with Payal Dev	
2020	Pyar Karona	"Pyar Karona"	Written along with Hussain Dalal	
2020	Tere Bina	"Tere Bina"	co-starring Jacqueline Fernandez	
2020	Bhai Bhai	"Bhai Bhai"	Duet with Ruhaan Arshad and co-written by Danish Sabri	

== Accolades ==
Khan won numerous awards including two National Film Awards and a Filmfare Award.

== See also ==
- Khans of Bollywood
