= Kony (film) =

1984 Indian film

- DVD cover of the film Koni
- Directed by: Saroj Dey
- Written by: Moti Nandi
- Based on: Koni by Moti Nandi
- Starring: Sriparna Banerjee; Soumitra Chatterjee; Snigdha Banerjee; Swarup Dutta
- Edited by: Ramesh Joshi
- Music by: Chinmay Chattopadhyay
- Release date: 16 April 1984
- Country: India
- Language: Bengali

Koni (sometimes spells as Koney or Kony) is a national award-winning Bengali movie released in 1984 directed by Saroj Dey, starring Soumitra Chatterjee and Sriparna Banerjee. This film is an adaptation of a Bengali novel by the same name written by Moti Nandi. The film's lead Sriparna Banerjee was also a professional swimmer herself in the 1970s and at the time of casting a student of Jadavpur University.

In a 2012 interview, veteran actor, Soumitra Chatterjee, called Koni one of the best films of his career. He even recalled using film's catch-phrase "Fight-Koni-fight" in hard times, as a chant to himself to lift his "aging spirits". The phrase had become popular with middle-class Bengalis at the time.

== Synopsis ==
Koni is an inspirational story of a coach and his trainee Koni who fight all odds to achieve their aims. Khidda (Soumitra Chatterjee) is a swimming coach who teaches swimming to underprivileged kids. He picks Kanakchampa Pal alias Kony (character played by Sriparna Banerjee) from a slum of Calcutta and grooms her to be part of the Bengal Swimming team to compete at the National Swimming Championship. However, politics, poverty and social stigma emerges as distinct roadblocks in their path.

== Awards ==
- National Film Award for Best Popular Film Providing Wholesome Entertainment at the 32nd National Film Awards.

== Cast and crew ==
=== Cast ===
- Sriparna Banerjee as Kony, a underprivileged teenaged girl from North Calcutta, who against all odds finally gets her dream fulfilled by shining in the National Meet as one of the representatives of Bengal and winning gold in 400 m relay.
- Soumitra Chatterjee as Khitish Sinha (Khid da)- a former chief coach of 'Jupiter' club who after serving the club for 35 years, gets humiliated & wrongly expelled from his club, discovers Kony and nurtures her to help her reach her triumph.
- Snigdha Banerjee
- Swarup Dutta as Pranabendu Biswas, another honest and idealist coach of Ballygunje Swimming Club, mentor of Kony's competitor Hiya. He is the key person to make Kony get selected for the National Meet and win her 1st medal.
- Bimal Deb
- Subrata Sensharma
- Sidhartha Bose
- Dipankar Banerjee
- Bhola Bose
- Ashoke Mitra
- Arijit Guha as Haricharan, Khidda's jealous competitor and chief trainer of Jupiter Club.

=== Crew ===
- Direction and screenplay: Saroj Dey
- Story: Moti Nandi
- Music Director: Chinmay Chattopadhyay
- Editor: Ramesh Joshi
- Art Direction: Subhash Singharoy
- Make Up: Basir Ahmed
- Cinematographer: Kamal Nayan
