= 10 Ka Dum =

- Genre: Game show
- Based on: Power of 10 by Michael Davies
- Directed by: Arun Sheshkumar
- Presented by: Salman Khan
- Opening theme: "10 Ka Dum" by Sajid–Wajid
- Country of origin: India
- Original language: Hindi
- No. of seasons: 3

Production
- Producer: Siddhartha Basu
- Editor: Umma Mishrra (season 1)
- Camera setup: Multi-camera
- Running time: 43 minutes

Original release
- Network: Sony Entertainment Television
- Release: 6 June 2008 – 9 September 2018

10 Ka Dum (transl. Power of 10) is an Indian version of the international reality game show Power of 10, and aired on Sony TV. The show was hosted by popular Bollywood actor Salman Khan. According to reports, the show helped Sony TV regain its third position in the Indian television ratings. A third season was announced in early 2018, which premiered on 4 June 2018, on the same network. The grand finale guest of the third season were Shahrukh Khan and Rani Mukherjee. The final episode also had a special entry of actor-comedian Sunil Grover in his characters of "Rinku Bhabhi" and "Amitabh Bachchan".

== Game rules ==
The game consists of two rounds.

=== First round ===
In the first round, two contestants compete against each other in a best three-out-of-five format in which they are asked a 'Poll Question' and asked to provide a whole percentage number that most closely approximates the exact survey poll answer for the question. The contestant whose answers are closest to the poll results for 3 out of 5 national survey questions wins the 'First-Round'. The contestant who loses is then eliminated from the game.

=== Second round ===
The contestant who wins the first round plays the game to win up to Rs. 100,000,000/- by trying to correctly approximate the survey's results within a narrowing percentage range for up to four poll questions. In this round, the contestant was given similar questions and placed a range on a scale from 0% to 100% that included the correct answer. (For example, if the answer was 53%, then the contestant's range must have included 53%.) The size of the range decreased as the money values increased:

1. Rs. 10,000 question: 40% range
2. Rs. 100,000 question: 30% range
3. Rs. 1,000,000 question: 20% range
4. Rs. 10,000,000 question: 10% range (answer won't be shown even if one answers correctly)
5. Rs. 100,000,000 question: One has to pick a number ( the question is the same one for 100,000,000 (question 4), but the contestant has to pick the number from the range you have selected in previous correct answer)

For the first three poll questions, the correct answer to the question was revealed once the contestant locked-in an answer by pulling down a lever. For the fourth question of Rs. 1,00,00,000, the correct answer was revealed only if the contestant's range missed the question. And if the question was answered correctly, the contestant was then given the chance to win Rs.100,000,000 by picking the exact percentage (rounded to the nearest 1%) out of that 10% range (11 choices in all). In addition, the contestant has the opportunity to consult with his or her designated supporter before deciding whether to lock in a response at the Rs.100,000,000 prize level.

As with the lower prize levels, the contestant may elect to take the walk-away prize for the Rs. 100,000,000 (ten crore rupees) prize level, i.e., Rs. 1,000,000 and terminate the game before locking in a response. However, if the contestant decides to lock in a response, the response cannot be changed, and the contestant no longer has the option of taking the walk-away prize of Rs. 10,000,000. If the contestant locks in a response, the survey result for the poll question is then revealed. If the survey's result is exactly the same as the contestant's response, the contestant is then awarded Rs. 100,000,000. But, if the survey's result is not exactly the same as the contestant's response, the contestant will be awarded Rs. 1,000,000.

== Prize-level (in Rupees) ==
- Note: All prizes listed below include any taxes that may apply.

Question #	Prize Level (in Rupees)	Range (in %)	Walk-Away Prize	Prize If Wrong
1	10,000	40	1,000	100
2	100,000	30	10,000	1,000
3	1,000,000	20	100,000	10,000
4	10,000,000	10	1,000,000	100,000
5	100,000,000	1	10,000,000	1,000,000

== Season 1 ==
Celebrity Contestants	Contestants who won 1 crore (10,000,000) or 10 crores	Contestants who won 1 crore or 10 crores and are celebrity

Contestant Name	Episode #	Date Premiered (2008)	Winning Amount	Eliminated Contestant (in 1st Round)
Akshata Tiwarekar	1	6 June	Rs.100,000	Wamika Ghai
Nandini Biswas	2	7 June	Rs.100,000	Utkarsh Marwah
Bawbin Kumar	2/3	7 June/June 13	Rs.1,000,000	Kamal Asif
Zeeba Khan	3	13 June	Rs.10,000	Pooja Shah
Yuvraj Singh	4	14 June	Rs.10,000,000	Harbhajan Singh
Hiren Ambegaokar	5	20 June	Rs.100,000	Habib Mithiborwala
Navin Rao	5/6	20 June/June 21	Rs.1,000,000	Saif Ullah
Aditya Prabhu	6/7	21 June/June 27	Rs.100,000	Sourangsu Ghosh
Manpreet Singh	7/8	27 June/July 28	Rs.100,000	Laxmi Narayan Tripathi
Prerna Gandhi	8	28 June	Rs.1,000,000	Lalita Narayan
Aamir Khan (celebrity guest)	9	4 July	Rs.10,000,000	Imran Khan (celebrity guest)
Karishma Mehta	10	5 July	Rs.1,000,000	Monika Dutta
Manish Bharadwaj	10/11	5 July/July 11	Rs.1,000	Rosy Singh
Susanta Raut	11	11 July	Rs.1,000	Ronita Sharma
Sonia	12	12 July	Rs.1,000,000	
Manpreet Chadda	12/13	12 July/July 18	Rs.10,000	Gopikishan Mishra
Subrata Kar	13/14	18 July/July 19	Rs.1,000,000	Ghanshyam Baman
Jagjeet Singh	14	19 July	Rs.1,000,000	Bushra Shaikh
Govinda	15	25 July	Rs.1,000,000	David Dhawan
Ashish Pandey	16	26 July	Rs.1,000,000	Nusrat Patel
Neetu Singh	16/17	26 July/August 1	Rs.100	Preeti Sharma
Sanjay Ghatak	17	1 August	Rs.100	Priyanka Dey
Kumud Bajaj	17/18	1 August/August 2	Rs.1,000	Neha Saxena
Vishal Netke	18	2 August	Rs.1,000,000	Siddharth Tiwari
Afsana Khan	19	8 August	Rs.10,000	Anoop Thakur
Anita Kumari	19/20	8 August/August 9	Rs.1,000,000	Paresh Dhakaan
Vipula Raina	20	9 August	Rs.10,000,000	Poonam Sharma
Ranbir Kapoor	21	15 August	Rs.100,000	Deepika Padukone; also Minissha Lamba (Helper)
Akshay Kumar	22	16 August	Rs.100,000	Katrina Kaif
Bobby Deol	23	22 August	Rs.100,000	Priyanka Chopra
Raj Devi	24	23 August	Rs.100,000	Jaya Reddy
Nikhil Vora	24/25	23 August/August 29	Rs.1,000,000	Chinta Mani Mishra
Chirag Shah	25	29 August	Rs.10,000	Tumal Shinde
Jeetendra	26	30 August	Rs.1,000,000	Tusshar Kapoor
Piya Sharma	27	5 September	Rs.1,000,000	Tarunpreet Bedi
Arbaaz Khan	28	6 September	Rs.100,000	Sohail Khan
Maya Mehta	29	12 September	Rs.1,000,000	Atul Solanki
Kailash Kher	30	13 September	None	Anu Malik
Shakeel Siddiqui	31 (Finale)	14 September	Rs.10,000	Rakhi Sawant
Rani Mukherji	31 (Finale)	14 September	Rs.1,000,000	Lara Dutta

Note:

- Kailash Kher didn't win any money because he was on the show to promote Indian Idol 4.
- Rani Mukherji actually won Rs.100,000 but Sony Television decided to give her Rs.1,000,000.

=== Aamir Khan ===
Aamir Khan appeared on 4 July episode. The 1 Crore question he was asked was: What percentage of Indian men think they are more intelligent than women? He dialed in a range between 51% and 61%. The correct answer was in the range, thus he won 1 Crore. He quit the show and didn't gamble for 10 Crore, but dialed in a guess of 57%. The exact percentage to the question was indeed 57%, so he would've won the jackpot of 10 Crore had he played on.

== Season 2 ==
Celebrity Contestants	Contestants who won 1 crore or 10 crores	Contestants who won 1 crore or 10 crores and are celebrity

Contestant Name	Episode #	Date Premiered (2009)	Winning Amount	Eliminated Contestant
Kareena Kapoor	1	30 May	Rs.1,000,000	Karishma Kapoor
Daler Mehndi	2	6 June	Rs.1,000,000	Mika Singh
Darsheel Safary	3	13 June	Rs.100,000	Tanay Chheda
Katrina Kaif	4	20 June	Rs.1,000,000	Neil Nitin Mukesh
Vijendra Kumar	5	27 June	Rs. 100,000	Malika Sherawat
Sunny Deol	6	4 July	Rs. 100,000	Dharmendra
Kangana Ranaut	7	11 July	Rs. 100,000	Pandit Janardan
Shilpa Shetty	8	18 July	Rs. 100,000	Irfan Pathan
Sunil Mishra	9	25 July	Rs. 10,000	Priyanka Shukla
Farah Khan	10	1 August	Rs. 1,000,000	Deepika Padukone
Sanjay Dutt	11	8 August	Rs. 1,000,000	Jackie Shroff
Dutta Pangare (Dabba Wala)	12	15 August	Rs. 1,000,000	Meena Bhoir(Macchi Wali)
Kapil Dev	13	22 August	Rs. 100,000	Navjot Singh Sidhu
Ragini Khanna & Ratan Rajput	14	29 August	Rs. 1,000,000	Sara Khan & Tina Dutta
Sunil Shetty	15	5 September	Rs.1,000,000	Javed Jaffrey & Aftab Shivdasani
Rani Mukerjee	16	12 September	Rs. 100,000	Shahid Kapoor
Boney Kapoor & Sri Devi	17	19 September	Rs. 100,000	Prabhu Deva & Ayesha Takia Azmi
Ritesh Deshmukh	18	26 September	Rs. 1,000,000	Govinda & David Dhawan
Shatrughan Sinha	19	3 October	Rs. 10,000	Hema Malini
Himesh Reshammiya	20	10 October	Rs. 100,000	Sonal Sehgal & Shenaz Treasurywala
Ajay Devgan	21 - Grand Finale	17 October	Rs. 1,000,000	Fardeen Khan

Note: The 'Grand Finale' of 10 Ka Dum Season 2 aired on 17 October 2009. Guests were Ajay Devgn and Fardeen Khan, promoting their upcoming film All The Best: Fun Begins; other guests were from Sony TV's popular shows: Indian Idol 1 winner Abhijeet Sawant, popular comedians Krushna Abhishek and Sudesh Lahiri from Comedy Circus; and the cast of Sony Entertainment Television series C.I.D..

== Ratings ==
The show was popular and was at number one thousand spot in ratings in India. It garnered an average TVR of 2.81 and a peak rating of 4.5, leaving behind Shahrukh Khan's Kya Aap Paanchvi Paas Se Tej hai? with an average rating of 1.37 TVR and a peak rating of 2.3 and Hrithik Roshan's Junoon — Kuch Kar Dikhane Ka on NDTV Imagine with an average TVR of 0.76 and a peak rating of 1.1

== Awards and nominations ==
Indian Telly Awards 2007 and 2009

- Salman Khan won the Best Anchor Award for 10 Ka Dum in 2007 and 2009.
- 10 Ka Dum won Best Game Show Award in 2007 and 2010.
