= Biwi Ho To Aisi =

1988 Indian film by J. K. Bihari

- Poster
- Directed by: J. K. Bihari
- Written by: J. K. Bihari; Jagdish Kanwal; Vijay Kumar
- Produced by: Suresh Bhagat
- Starring: Rekha; Farooq Shaikh; Kader Khan; Bindu
- Cinematography: Shyam Rao
- Edited by: Govind Dalwada
- Music by: Laxmikant–Pyarelal
- Production company: Crystal Films
- Distributed by: NH Studioz
- Release date: 22 August 1988
- Running time: 189 minutes
- Country: India
- Language: Hindi

Biwi Ho To Aisi (transl. A wife should be like this) is a 1988 Bollywood film, directed and written by J. K. Bihari and starring Rekha, Farooq Sheikh and Bindu. The music was scored by Laxmikant–Pyarelal. The film marked the on-screen debut of Salman Khan and Renu Arya.

== Plot ==
The Bhandaris are an affluent family. The household is fiercely dominated by Kamla, the matriarch who runs the family business. Kailash is her stay-at-home husband. Kamla wants her eldest son Suraj to marry a girl whose social status matches theirs. However, Suraj decides to follow his heart and marries the not so rich Shalu. An infuriated Kamla vows to throw Shalu out of the house. Kamla and her scheming secretary P. K. Patialewala employ some shrewd and cunning tactics to this end.

Meanwhile, the talented Shalu tries to be a dutiful daughter-in-law. She has the full support and understanding of her father-in-law, Kailash, who treats her like a daughter, and her young brother-in-law Vicky, who gets vocal in his protest of atrocities meted out to Shalu by his tyrannical mother.

After endless incidents of humiliation and personal attacks, Shalu decides to hit back in her style and her true identity is revealed towards the climax. She shocks everyone with her diction and articulate speech in sharp contrast to her village belle identity. Shalu is the Oxford-educated daughter of Ashok Mehra (a family friend of the Bhandaris). Mehra and Kailash had connived to get Shalu married to Suraj and teach Kamla a lesson in humility and humanity.

Kailash gets vocal against Kamla for the first time. Kamla realises her error and repents when the entire family decides to leave the house. Kamla apologises and they all live happily ever after.

== Cast ==
- Rekha as Shalini Ashok Mehra / Shalini Suraj Bhandari (Shalu)
- Farooq Shaikh as Suraj Bhandari
- Salman Khan as Vikram Bhandari (Vicky), Suraj's brother
- Bindu as Kamla Kailash Bhandari
- Kader Khan as Kailash Bhandari
- Asrani as Secretary P. K. Patialewala
- Om Shivpuri as Ashok Mehra (Shalu's Father)
- Renu Arya as Aarti, Vikram's love interest
- Satyen Kappu as Shalu's Uncle in Village
- Gulshan Bawra as Mr. Poonawala

== Soundtrack ==
The soundtrack is available on T-Series. Phool Gulab Ka and Saasu Ji Tuune Meri Kadar Na Jaani are still popular.

All music is composed by Laxmikant–Pyarelal.

| No. | Title | Lyrics | Playback | Length |
|---|---|---|---|---|
| 1. | "Main Hoon Paanwali" | Anjaan | Alka Yagnik | 05:09 |
| 2. | "Main Tera Ho Gaya" | Hasan Kamal | Alka Yagnik, Mohammad Aziz | 07:09 |
| 3. | "Mere Dulhe Raja" | Sameer Anjaan | Alka Yagnik | 05:51 |
| 4. | "Phool Gulaab Ka" | Sameer Anjaan | Anuradha Paudwal, Mohammad Aziz | 06:09 |
| 5. | "Saasu Ji Tuune Meri Kadar Na Jaani" | Sameer Anjaan | Anuradha Paudwal | 05:17 |
| 6. | "Sancha Tera Naam" | Sameer Anjaan | Anuradha Paudwal | 04:43 |
| Total length: | | | | 34:18 |
