= National Film Award for Best Popular Film Providing Wholesome Entertainment =

Film award in India

- National award for contributions to Indian Cinema
- Sponsored by: National Film Development Corporation of India
- Formerly called: Best Feature Film with Mass Appeal, Wholesome Entertainment and Aesthetic Value (1974–1985); Best Film Providing Popular and Wholesome Entertainment (1986–1988)
- Rewards: Swarna Kamal (Golden Lotus); ₹3,00,000
- First award: 1974
- Most recent winner: Kalki 2898 AD (2024)

The National Film Award for Best Popular Film Providing Wholesome Entertainment is one of the National Film Awards presented annually by the National Film Development Corporation of India, and was constituted in the year 1975. This is one of the Golden Lotus Awards (Swarna Kamal) given among National Film Awards. It is announced for films produced in a year across the country, in all Indian languages.

Films in the following languages have won the Best Popular Feature Film award: Hindi (30 awards), Telugu (7 awards), Tamil (4 awards), Malayalam (3 awards), Bengali, and Kannada (2 awards each).

With six wins, Yash Raj Films is the production house with the most wins. With five wins, Yash Chopra is the producer with the most wins, producing most of the company's winning films. He has also directed four winning films, the most for any director.

== Winners ==
Indicates a joint award for that year

List of films, showing the year (award ceremony), language(s), producer(s) and director(s)
Year	Film(s)	Language(s)	Producer(s)	Director(s)	Refs.
1974 (22nd)	Kora Kagaz (Note: Vijay Anand (Leading Actor) and Jaya Bhaduri (Leading Actress) were awarded with Medallion.)	Hindi	Sanat Kothari for Shreeji Films	Anil Ganguly	
1975 (23rd)	Tapasya	Hindi	Rajshri Productions	Anil Ganguly	
1976 (24th)	No Award				
1977 (25th)	Swami	Hindi	Jaya Charavarthy	Basu Chatterjee	
1978 (26th)	Ganadevata	Bengali	Department of Information and Cultural Affairs (Government of West Bengal)	Tarun Majumdar	
1979 (27th)	Sankarabharanam	Telugu	Edida Nageswara Rao	K. Viswanath	
1980 (28th)	No Award				
1981 (29th)	No Award				
1982 (30th)	No Award				
1983 (31st)	No Award				
1984 (32nd)	Koni	Bengali	Government of West Bengal	Saroj Dey	
1985 (33rd)	No Award				
1986 (34th)	Samsaram Adhu Minsaram	Tamil	AVM Productions	Visu	
1987 (35th)	Pushpaka Vimana	Kannada	Singeetam Srinivasa Rao and Shringar Nagaraj	Singeetam Srinivasa Rao	
1988 (36th)	Qayamat Se Qayamat Tak	Hindi	Nasir Hussain Films	Mansoor Khan	
1989 (37th)	Chandni	Hindi	Yash Raj Films	Yash Chopra	
1989 (37th)	Geethanjali	Telugu	Bhagyalakshmi Enterprises	Mani Ratnam	
1990 (38th)	Ghayal	Hindi	Dharmendra	Rajkumar Santoshi	
1991 (39th)	No Award				
1992 (40th)	Sargam	Malayalam	Bhavani	Hariharan	
1993 (41st)	Manichitrathazhu	Malayalam	Appachan	Fazil	
1993 (41st)	Darr	Hindi	Yash Chopra	Yash Chopra	
1994 (42nd)	Hum Aapke Hain Koun..!	Hindi	Rajshri Productions	Sooraj R. Barjatya	
1995 (43rd)	Dilwale Dulhania Le Jayenge	Hindi	Yash Chopra	Aditya Chopra	
1996 (44th)	Maachis	Hindi	R. V. Pandit	Gulzar	
1997 (45th)	Dil To Pagal Hai	Hindi	Yash Chopra	Yash Chopra	
1998 (46th)	Kuch Kuch Hota Hai	Hindi	Yash Johar	Karan Johar	
1999 (47th)	Sarfarosh	Hindi	John Matthew Matthan	John Matthew Matthan	
2000 (48th)	Vaanathaippola	Tamil	V. Ravichandran	Vikraman	
2001 (49th)	Lagaan	Hindi	Aamir Khan	Ashutosh Gowariker	
2002 (50th)	Devdas	Hindi	Bharat Shah	Sanjay Leela Bhansali	
2003 (51st)	Munna Bhai M.B.B.S.	Hindi	Vidhu Vinod Chopra	Rajkumar Hirani	
2004 (52nd)	Veer-Zaara	Hindi	Yash Raj Films	Yash Chopra	
2004 (52nd)	Autograph	Tamil	Cheran	Cheran	
2005 (52nd)	Rang De Basanti	Hindi	UTV Motion Pictures and Rakeysh Omprakash Mehra Pictures	Rakeysh Omprakash Mehra	
2005 (52nd)	Shubhodrishti	Bengali	Rajshri Productions and Shree Venkatesh Films	Prabhat Roy	
2006 (54th)	Lage Raho Munna Bhai	Hindi	Vidhu Vinod Chopra	Rajkumar Hirani	
2007 (55th)	Chak De! India	Hindi	Aditya Chopra	Shimit Amin	
2008 (56th)	Oye Lucky! Lucky Oye!	Hindi	UTV Motion Pictures	Dibakar Banerjee	
2009 (57th)	3 Idiots	Hindi	Vidhu Vinod Chopra	Rajkumar Hirani	
2010 (58th)	Dabangg	Hindi	Arbaaz Khan, Malaika Arora Khan, and Dhillin Mehta	Abhinav Kashyap	
2011 (59th)	Azhagarsamiyin Kuthirai	Tamil	P. Madhan	Suseenthiran	
2012 (60th)	Vicky Donor	Hindi	Sunil Lulla, John Abraham, Ronnie Lahiri and Ram Mirchandani	Shoojit Sircar	
2012 (60th)	Ustad Hotel	Malayalam	Listin Stephen	Anwar Rasheed	
2013 (61st)	Bhaag Milkha Bhaag	Hindi	Rakeysh Omprakash Mehra	Rakeysh Omprakash Mehra	
2014 (62nd)	Mary Kom	Hindi	Sanjay Leela Bhansali	Omung Kumar	
2015 (63rd)	Bajrangi Bhaijaan	Hindi	Salman Khan and Rockline Venkatesh	Kabir Khan	
2016 (64th)	Sathamanam Bhavati	Telugu	Dil Raju	Satish Vegesna	
2017 (65th)	Baahubali 2: The Conclusion	Telugu	Prasad Devineni	S. S. Rajamouli	
2018 (66th)	Badhaai Ho	Hindi	Amit Sharma		
2019 (67th)	Maharshi	Telugu	Dil Raju	Vamshi Paidipally	
2020 (68th)	Tanhaji : The Unsung Warrior	Hindi	Ajay Devgn	Om Raut	
2021 (69th)	RRR	Telugu	D. V. V. Danayya	S. S. Rajamouli	
2022 (70th)	Kantara	Kannada	Vijay Kiragandur	Rishab Shetty	
2023 (71st)	Rocky Aur Rani Kii Prem Kahaani	Hindi	Apoorva Mehta	Karan Johar	
2024 (72nd)	Kalki 2898 AD	Telugu	C. Aswini Dutt	Nag Ashwin	
