= Chillar Party =

2011 film by Nitesh Tiwari

- Theatrical release poster
- Directed by: Vikas Bahl; Nitesh Tiwari
- Written by: Story: Vikas Bahl; Nitesh Tiwari; Screenplay & Dialogues: Vijay Maurya
- Produced by: Salman Khan; Ronnie Screwvala
- Starring: Shriya Sharma; Sanath Menon; Rohan Grover; Naman Jain; Aarav Khanna; Vishesh Tiwari; Shashank Shende
- Cinematography: Amitabha Singh
- Edited by: Aarif Sheikh
- Music by: Amit Trivedi
- Production companies: UTV Spotboy; SKBH Productions
- Distributed by: UTV Motion Pictures
- Release date: 8 July 2011
- Running time: 127 mins
- Country: India
- Language: Hindi

Chillar Party (transl. Children's party) is a 2011 Indian Hindi-language family comedy film conceived and directed by Nitesh Tiwari and Vikas Bahl, produced by Ronnie Screwvala and Salman Khan, and written by Vijay Maurya. The film stars multiple child artists in lead roles, with Shashank Shende, Pankaj Tripathi and Swara Bhasker in supporting roles. Ranbir Kapoor features in a dance song. The storyline revolves around a cohort of savvy youngsters whose lives intersect with those of a corrupt politician, the latter intent on seizing and euthanizing the children's beloved street dog.

Chillar Party won the 2011 National Film Award for Best Children's Film.

== Plot ==
Eight boys, known collectively as the "Chillar Party", live in Chandan Nagar, a colony in Mumbai. They frequently lose games of cricket to a neighbouring team, and care for a dog named "Loose Motion".

Their hopes are shattered shortly after a boy, Fatka, who was employed for washing the cars of the society, enters with his dog Bhidu. They do everything to throw the boy and his dog out, but become unsuccessful. Eventually they develop a friendship with each other as Fatka helps them by serving as the lead bowler during the match with the neighbouring cricket team. During this time, they also start interacting with a young girl who moves in and an unemployed youngster who becomes successful after Fatka helps him out.

But their happiness is short-lived when a reckless politician, welfare minister Shashikant Bhide, enters their life after his personal secretary Dubey is attacked by Bhidu for hurting Fatka. Bhide announces in a news telecast that all the stray dogs roaming about in residential buildings in Mumbai will be caught and terminated, misleading audiences with a concern for public safety. He further informs that the dog(s) can only be saved if the society files a No Objection Certificate within 1 month. The kids, shocked by this, strive hard to get the NOC, wherein they have to get at least more than 50% votes of the total residents in the society, i.e., 31 votes. But they manage only 10 votes after 15 days.

With more efforts gone in vain, the kids finally organize a march across the streets purely in underwear. This gains them enough traction to pull 10 more votes. With more hard work and awareness, they manage to get another 10 votes, counting a total of 30 votes. With only a day left for the deadline as declared by Bhide, they approach secretary L.N. Tandon, who is close to Bhide and has resented the kids all this while. While all this chaos is going on, a TV channel invites Bhide and the kids for face-off. Seeing this as their last chance, they attend the interview, which is being telecast across India. Knowing that that is the last day and dog catchers are after Bhidu, they pray hard to save him.

During the interview, they are constantly mocked by Bhide, who questions their education and upbringing, but it soon takes a turn and culminates in the kids answering Bhide back with their moral education responses. Having won, the kids plead to leave after a moving speech by Fatka, and the interviewers agree. When they reach the society, they are disheartened as there is no sight of Bhidu. Suddenly, Bhidu comes jumping in, wearing a collar reading "Bhidu-Chandan Nagar Society." While they are happy seeing Bhidu, they realize Tandon changed his mind after the face-off; he too is happy and seen cheering for them.

== Cast ==
- Araav Khanna as Aflatoon
- Chinmai Chandranshuh as Lucky Singh / Panauti
- Divij Handa as Shaolin
- Irfan Khan as Fatka
- Naman Jain as Balwan Jhangiani / Janghya
- Rohan Grover as Ramashanker Iyer / Akram
- Sanath Menon as Arjun Saxena / Encyclopedia
- Vedant Desai as Silencer
- Vishesh Tiwari as Laxman / Second Hand
- Shriya Sharma as Toothpaste
- Rajesh Sharma as L.N. Tandon, the secretary of Chandan Nagar Society
- Satyadeep Mishra as Advocate Saxena, Arjun's father
- Sonal Jha as Mrs. Saxena, Arjun's mother
- Sapna Sand as Janghya's mother
- Swara Bhasker as Talk show host
- Aakash Dahiya as Manish / RJ Manisha / Googly
- Pankaj Tripathi as Dubey, minister Bhide's manager
- Shashank Shende as Minister Shashikant Bhide
- Indrayudh Mandal as Kartik
- Sillo Mahava as Aunty
- Jaswinder Gardner as Shaolin's mother
- Bachchan Pachera as Old Watchman
- Soumik Sen as Pakau
- Rajendra Sethi as Mr. Jhangiani, Balwan's father
- Ravi Jhankal as Sutli Bomb uncle
- Geeta Agarwal Sharma as Panauti's mother
- Bhidu (Loose Motion) as Dog
- Ranbir Kapoor's special appearance as himself in the song "Tai Tai Phish"

== Soundtrack ==
The music was composed by Amit Trivedi, while the lyrics were penned by Tiwari with Bahl, Trivedi and Amitabh Bhattacharya as guest lyricists.

=== Track listing ===
No.	Title	Lyrics	Singer(s)	Length
1.	"Aa Rela Hai Apun"	Nitesh Tiwari	Amit Trivedi	3:41
2.	"Behla Do"	Nitesh Tiwari	Armaan Malik, Firoza	3:49
3.	"Chatte Batte"	Nitesh Tiwari	Armaan Malik, Mohit Chauhan, Gaurika Rai, Keshav Rai	4:40
4.	"Ek School Banana Hai"	Amitabh Bhattacharya	Gaurika Rai, Keshav Rai, Firoza	4:07
5.	"Liar Liar"	Vikas Bahl	Gaurika Rai, Keshav Rai	4:14
6.	"Tai Tai Phish"	Nitesh Tiwari, Amit Trivedi	Amit Trivedi, Jaishri Trivedi	3:30
7.	"Ziddi Piddi"	Nitesh Tiwari	Armaan Malik, Amit Trivedi, Tanmay Chaudhari, Gaurika Rai	4:19
8.	"Chatte Batte" (Sad Version)	Nitesh Tiwari	Mohit Chauhan	2:32

== Reception ==
=== Critical reception ===
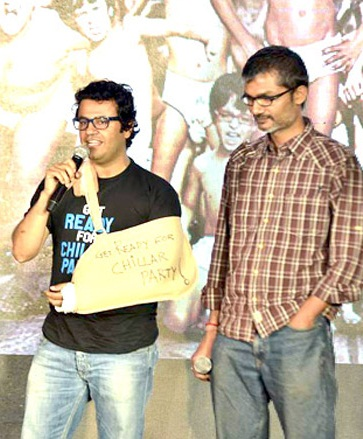
Vikas Bahl and Nitesh Tiwari – Directors

Chillar Party received mostly positive reviews from critics. Taran Adarsh of Bollywood Hungama gave it 3.5 out of 5 stars and said – "On the whole, Chillar Party is not just for kids, but for grownups as well. A story of grit and determination, it works not just as an entertainer, but also advocates a message rather strongly. A film that deserves to be tax-exempted so that it reaches out to a wider audience. A small film with a gigantic spirit... Encourage this one!" Saibal Chatterjee of NDTV rated it with 3 out of 5 stars and said – "Through the entire first half, the writer-director duo holds the proceedings at a level that is completely in sync with the unpretentious spirit of the film. In the run-up to the climax, however, the film comes precariously close to tying itself up in knots as the child-like aura it builds up begins to teeter on the edge of childishness. Mercifully, it stays on its feet and doesn't topple over. For that alone the film deserves at least three stars." Zee News gave the film 4 stars and wrote, "Chiller Party may be a small film. But as cinema goes, in its adroitness, it is much more mature than 99 percent of the films ever made in India. And that, you`ll reckon, is no `small` achievement." Sonia Chopra of Sify awarded it 4 stars saying, "Storytelling by co-directors-writers-lyricists Vikas Bahl and Nitesh Tiwari is first-rate. They make you deeply connect with the characters". Shivesh Kumar of IndiaWeekly awarded the movie 3 out of 5 stars. Preeti Arora of Rediff gave it 3 out of 5 stars and wrote – "Chillar Party is an enjoyable film with plenty of laughs. Do watch this, unless of course you hate kids." Vandana Krishnan from Behindwoods gave the film 3 out of 5 stars describing the film as "fun filled one that is sure to leave you with a smile and moist eyes. Humor, emotions, and 'dog is man's best friend' entertainment and values- You can't ask for more." Oneindia.in gave 3 stars while commenting "On the whole, Chillar Party is not just for kids, but grownups also will enjoy the film equally. A story of great determination presented in an entertaining way is what makes Chillar Party a good watch.

Nikhat Kazmi of Times of India gave Chillar Party 2 out of 5 stars and said – "Filmmakers need to realize Indian teens are extremely smart and are fed on a regular diet of Cartoon Network and roller-coaster Hollywood kiddie's flicks. You got to have a story, adventure drama and pace." Soumil Shukla of FilmiTadka rated it with 2.5 out of five stars and wrote in his review – "despite its shortcomings, Chillar Party succeeds in overcoming a lot of deformations forced by the ‘formula’ philosophy on this genre of films. If not for anything else, watch it to enjoy the delightful performances from the young actors who are the real heroes of this film."

=== Accolades ===
Chillar Party won the 2011 National Film Award for Best Children's Film. Along with this, it also won 2011 National Film Award for Best Child Artist and Best Screenplay (Original).
