= Arbaaz Khan filmography =

Filmography article

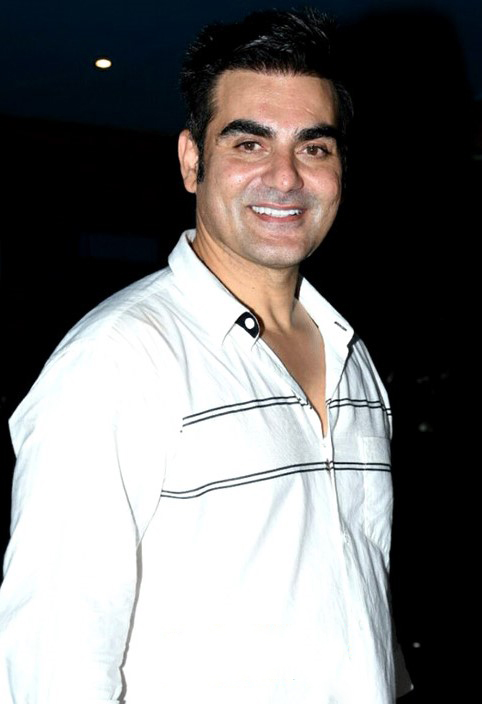
Arbaaz Khan at birthday function

Arbaaz Khan is an Indian actor, director and producer who works mainly in Hindi cinema alongside few Urdu, Telugu and Malayalam language films. Arbaaz Khan made his debut in the 1996 Hindi film Daraar as a psychotic wife-beater villain, for which he received Filmfare Award for Best Performance in a Negative Role. He has starred in many multi-starrer hit films such as Pyaar Kiya To Darna Kya (1998), for which he received a Filmfare Award for Best Supporting Actor nomination, and Garv: Pride and Honour (2004), where he acted opposite his own brother Salman Khan.

Following his success with the negative roles, he then played a villainous role in the 2003 film Qayamat: City Under Threat (Note: It was successful at the box office). He also played several supporting roles in director Priyadarshan's comedy films Hulchul (2004), Malamaal Weekly (2006) and Bhagam Bhag (2006) alongside another supporting roles as a police officer (Constable Javed Shaikh) and a mobster (Moscow Chikna) in the 2007 multi-starrers Shootout at Lokhandwala and Fool and Final respectively.

He also made a cameo appearance, alongside his brother Sohail Khan, in the blockbuster Jaane Tu... Ya Jaane Na, starring Imran Khan and Genelia D'Souza. In 2009, he starred alongside Sohail in Kisaan and played a villain in Jai Veeru. Khan also appeared in the television serial Karishma - The Miracles of Destiny in 2003, and has appeared in many TV programs from time to time.

He then made his Telugu debut by playing a negative role in the film Jai Chiranjeeva starring Chiranjeevi.

In 2010, Khan ventured into film production with the company named Arbaaz Khan Productions. His first film as a producer was Dabangg, which was released in September 2010. The film starred his brother Salman in the leading role as the cop-hero Chulbul Pandey, alongside Arbaaz as his younger brother Makkhanchand "Makkhi" Pandey. (Note: ”Makkhi” means housefly in Hindi.) His former wife Malaika Arora Khan was featured in the popular item number "Munni Badnaam". The film became a blockbuster within the first week of its release and broke several box office records, becoming the second highest grossing Bollywood film of all time at the time of its release. On 12 March 2011, while Khan was a special guest of Australia's Indian film festival, Bollywood & Beyond, he helped his former wife Malaika Arora lead a successful world record attempt in Melbourne. 1235 participants successfully performed a choreographed dance to "Munni Badnaam" from the Dabangg soundtrack.

Khan made his directorial debut with the 2012 released sequel of Dabangg, Dabangg 2 which was a huge commercial success surpassing the first installment.

Khan made his Malayalam cinema debut in Big Brother starring Mohanlal.

In 2019, he had acted again the third installment of the Dabangg series,Dabangg 3 where he still played the role of producer but director was replaced by Prabhu Deva. The film was expected to become a blockbuster surpassing Dabangg 2, but grossed lower than it.

== Hindi language films ==
Year	Title	Role	Notes
1996	Daraar	Vikram	
1998	Sham Ghansham	Gansham	
1998	Pyaar Kiya To Darna Kya	Vishal Thakur	
1999	Hello Brother	Inspector Vishal	
2002	Maa Tujhhe Salaam	Albaksh	
2002	Yeh Mohabbat Hai	Abdul Jamil	
2002	Tumko Na Bhool Paayenge	Veer Singh Thakur	Cameo
2002	Soch	Om	
2003	Qayamat: City Under Threat	Ali Ramani	
2003	Kuch Naa Kaho	Sanjeev Shrivastav	
2004	Garv: Pride and Honour	Inspector Haider Ali Khan	
2004	Wajahh: A Reason to Kill	Dr. Aditya Bhargava	
2004	Hulchul	Shakti A. Chand	
2004	Alibaba Aur 40 Chor	Alibaba	
2005	Maine Pyaar Kyun Kiya	Man on Plane	Cameo
2005	Taj Mahal: An Eternal Love Story	Aurangzeb	
2006	Malamaal Weekly	Jayesh Agarwal	Uncredited
2006	Iqraar: By Chance	CBI Officer R.B. Mathur	
2006	Bhagam Bhag	Vikram Chauhan	
2007	Shootout at Lokhandwala	Inspector Javed Khan	
2007	Fool N Final	Moscow Chikna	
2007	Dhol	Jaishankar 'Jai' Yadav	
2007	Dus Kahaniyaan	Rahul Sarin	Anthology film; segment: Matrimony
2007	Om Shanti Om	Himself	Special appearance in song Deewangi Deewangi
2008	Woodstock Villa	Jatin	
2008	Thodi Life Thoda Magic	Roshan Merchant	
2008	Jaane Tu... Ya Jaane Na	Bhalu	
2008	Hello	Anuj	
2008	Fashion	Abhijeet Sarin	
2009	Mere Khwabon Mein Jo Aaye	Vikram Singh	
2009	The Stoneman Murders	Kedar	
2009	Jai Veeru	Tejpal	
2009	Kisaan	Aman Singh	
2010	Prem Kaa Game	Prem Sahni	
2010	Dabangg	Makhanchand "Makkhi" Pandey	Producer also
2011	Ready	Gaurav	Cameo
2012	Dabangg 2	Makhanchand "Makkhi" Pandey	Also director and producer
2015	Dolly Ki Doli	—N/a	Producer only
2015	Kis Kisko Pyaar Karoon	Tiger Bhai	
2016	Freaky Ali	Maqsood	
2016	Yea Toh Two Much Ho Gayaa	Mak	
2017	Jeena Isi Ka Naam Hai	Aditya Kapoor	
2017	Tera Intezaar	Veer Singh Rajput	
2018	Nirdosh	Inspector lokhande	
2018	Jack and Dil	KK Walia	
2018	Loveyatri	Jignesh	Cameo
2019	Main Zaroor Aaunga	Yash Malhotra / Harsh Malhotra	Dual role
2019	Dabangg 3	Makhanchand "Makkhi" Pandey	Also producer
2023	Farrey	Chavi's father	
2024	Patna Shuklla	—N/a	Producer only
2024	Bandaa Singh Chaudhary	—N/a	Producer only
2025	Kaal Trighori	Dr. Manoj	
2026	Bihu Attack		
TBA	Sridevi Bungalow †	TBA	Filming; Cameo
TBA	Kesar Singh †	Alok Singh	Filming

== Telugu language films ==
Year	Title	Role	Notes
2005	Jai Chiranjeeva	Pasupathi	
2017	Kittu Unnadu Jagratha	AIR	
2024	Shivam Bhaje	Murali IPS	

== Other language films ==
Year	Title	Role	Language	Notes
2007	Godfather	Shakir Khan	Urdu	Pakistani film
2019	Big Brother	Vedantham IPS / Edwin Moses	Malayalam	

== Television ==
Year	Title	Role	Notes
2003	Karishma - The Miracles of Destiny	Arnaav	
2013–2014	Comedy Circus	Judge	
2015–2016	Power Couple	Host	
2019	Poison	Antonio Verghese	
2019–present	Pinch	Host	
2022–present	Tanaav	Vikrant Rathore	

== Dubbing roles ==
Film title	Actor	Character	Dub Language	Original Language	Original Year Release	Dub Year Release	Notes
Dhruva	Arvind Swamy	Venkanna / Dr. Siddharth Abhimanyu	Hindi	Telugu	2016	2017	
