= Dabangg (film series) =

Indian film series

- Official logo
- Created by: Abhinav Kashyap
- Owners: Arbaaz Khan Productions; Shree Ashtavinayak Cine Vision; Stellar Films; Salman Khan Films; Saffron Broadcast & Media

Films and television
- Films: Dabangg (2010); Dabangg 2 (2012); Dabangg 3 (2019)

Dabangg is a series of Indian Hindi-language action comedy films produced in common by Arbaaz Khan, starring Salman Khan as the titular cop Chulbul Pandey, Sonakshi Sinha as his love interest Rajjo Pandey, and Arbaaz Khan as Chulbul's step-brother Makhanchand "Makkhi" Pandey. The original work is 2010 film, named Dabangg was directed by Abhinav Kashyap and produced by Dhilin Mehta.

== Films ==
Film	Release date	Director	Screenwriter(s)	Story by	Producer(s)
Dabangg	10 September 2010	Abhinav Singh Kashyap	Dilip Shukla, Abhinav Singh Kashyap	Abhinav Singh Kashyap	Arbaaz Khan, Malaika Arora Khan, Dhilin Mehta
Dabangg 2	21 December 2012	Arbaaz Khan	Dilip Shukla	Dilip Shukla	Arbaaz Khan, Malaika Arora Khan
Dabangg 3	20 December 2019	Prabhu Deva	Dilip Shukla, Salman Khan, Prabhu Deva, Aloke Upadhyaya	Salman Khan	Salman Khan, Arbaaz Khan, Nikhil Dwivedi

=== Dabangg (2010 film) ===
A brave and honest and diligent police officer, Inspector Chulbul Pandey as (Salman Khan), faces challenges from his family, gangsters and politicians as Chedi Singh (Sonu Sood).

The first installment of the series centers on the fictional incidents. Chulbul Pandey is a cop who has his own way of dealing with corruption. His detractor Cheddi Singh manages to create a rift between Chulbul and his step-brother and uses it to his advantage. Dabangg was released on 10 September 2010, and gained positive reviews. Mathures Paul of The Statesman gave the film 3.5 stars and commented that "Dabangg aligns itself with viewers frustrated by the nonexistence of uncomplicated heroism on screen". It earned ₹219 crore worldwide against a budget of ₹42 crore.

=== Dabangg 2 (2012 film) ===
Inspector Chulbul Pandey as (Salman Khan) invites a fresh trouble when he kills the brother of a notorious politician and the former swears to wreak havoc in his life as Thakur Bachcha Lal Singh (Prakash Raj).

After the success of Dabangg Arbaaz and Salman reunited once again for sequel. The second installment in this series, the plot focused on Chulbul Pandey, a wayward policeman, who kills the brother of a crooked politician. In retribution, the politician sends his henchmen to attack Chulbul's wife which leaves Chulbul infuriated. Dabangg 2 was released in 3500 screens in India and 450 screens overseas on 21 December 2012. It had the highest screen count for any film in India and worldwide, surpassing that of Ek Tha Tiger. It received mixed reviews from critics. Taran Adarsh of Bollywood Hungama gave the film 4 out of 5 stars and said "Dabangg 2 has Salman Khan, Salman Khan and Salman Khan plus entertainment, entertainment and entertainment in large doses". The film was declared a blockbuster by Box Office India after its first week. Dabangg 2 grossed around $11.75 million in its total lifetime.

=== Dabangg 3 (2019 film) ===
Assistant Commissioner of Police Chulbul Pandey as (Salman Khan) encounters an enemy from his past, and his origin story as the fearless cop unfolds as Balwant "Bali" Singh (Sudeep Sanjeev).

A circumquel, Dabangg 3, was commissioned after the success of the previous film and was directed by Prabhu Deva, with both Salman and Sonakshi reprising their roles and Saiee Manjrekar in a cameo role. The film focused on ASP Chulbul Pandey who enjoys an ideal family life while catching criminals in his own bombastic way. However, an enemy from his past returns and threatens to destroy everything he has worked for. The film was theatrically released worldwide on 20 December 2019, on the Pre-Christmas weekend, in Hindi, and dubbed Tamil, Telugu and Kannada languages to negative reviews from both critics and audience. Dabangg 3 opening day domestic collection was ₹24.50 crore. As of 19 January 2020, with a gross of est. ₹161 crore in India and ₹56.99 crore overseas, the film has a worldwide gross collection of est. ₹325 crore and has become the tenth highest grossing Bollywood film of 2019.

== Animated series ==
An animated series based on the film franchise, also titled Dabangg, premiered on 31 May 2021 as the title Dabangg Animated TV Series on Cartoon Network which was also produced by the same company and Cosmos Maya with CN India. It also aired on Pogo TV in February 2022.

== Recurring cast and characters ==
This table lists the main characters who appear in the Dabangg Franchise.

List indicator
- A dark grey cell indicates the character was not in the film.

Actor	Films		
Actor	Dabangg (2010)	Dabangg 2 (2012)	Dabangg 3 (2019)
Salman Khan	Inspector, A.S.P, A.C.P Dhaakadchand "Chulbul" Pandey	Inspector, A.S.P, A.C.P Dhaakadchand "Chulbul" Pandey	Inspector, A.S.P, A.C.P Dhaakadchand "Chulbul" Pandey
Sonakshi Sinha	Rajjo Shreshawat Pandey / Miss Chulbul Pandey	Rajjo Shreshawat Pandey / Miss Chulbul Pandey	Rajjo Shreshawat Pandey / Miss Chulbul Pandey
Arbaaz Khan	Makhanchand "Makkhi" Pandey	Makhanchand "Makkhi" Pandey	Makhanchand "Makkhi" Pandey
Vinod Khanna	Prajapati Pandey	Prajapati Pandey	
Pramod Khanna			Prajapati Pandey
Dimple Kapadia	Naini Devi		Naini Devi
Mahesh Manjrekar	Hariya Shreshawat	Hariya Shreshawat	Hariya Shreshawat
Shyamlaal	Chhedi's photographer	Chhedi's photographer	
Ram Sujan Singh	Constable Chaubey	Constable Chaubey	Constable Chaubey
Pradeep Chaudhary	Constable Tewari	Constable Tewari	Constable Tewari
Daddi Pandey	Constable Pichkari Yadav	Constable Pichkari Yadav	Constable Pichkari Yadav
Mahie Gill	Nirmala Pandey	Nirmala Pandey	
Tinnu Anand	Masterji	Masterji	
Malaika Arora	Munni	Munni	
Warina Hussain			Item number
Sonu Sood	Chedi Singh		
Prakash Raj		Thakur Bachcha Lal Singh	
Sudeepa			Balwant "Bali" Singh

== Additional crew and production details ==
Occupation	Film		
Occupation	Dabangg (2010)	Dabangg 2 (2012)	Dabangg 3 (2019)
Director	Abhinav Kashyap	Arbaaz Khan	Prabhu Deva
Producer(s)	Dhilin Mehta; Malaika Arora Khan; Arbaaz Khan	Arbaaz Khan; Malaika Arora Khan	Salman Khan; Arbaaz Khan; Nikhil Dwivedi
Writer(s)	Dilip Shukla; Abhinav Kashyap	Dilip Shukla	Salman Khan; Prabhu Deva; Dilip Shukla; Aloke Upadhyaya; Prabhu Deva; Salman Khan; Arbaaz Khan
Composer(s)	Sajid–Wajid; Lalit Pandit	Sajid–Wajid	Sajid–Wajid
Background score	Sandeep Shirodkar	Sandeep Shirodkar	Sandeep Shirodkar
Director of photography	Mahesh Limaye	Mahesh Limaye; Aseem Mishra	Mahesh Limaye
Editor(s)	Pranav V Dhiwar	Hemal Kothari	Ritesh Soni
Production companies	Arbaaz Khan Productions; Shree Ashtavinayak Cine Vision	Arbaaz Khan Productions	Salman Khan Films; Arbaaz Khan Productions; Saffron Broadcast & Media Limited; Salman Khan Films; Arbaaz Khan Productions; Saffron Broadcast & Media Limited
Distributing companies	Shree Ashtavinayak Cine Vision; UTV Motion Pictures	Eros International	Salman Khan Films (India); Yash Raj Films (International); Salman Khan Films(India)
Running time	126 minutes	123 minutes	141 minutes

== Release and revenue ==
Each film is linked to the "Box office" section of its article:

Film	Release date	Budget	Box office revenue
Dabangg	10 September 2010	₹41 crore (US$8.97 million)	₹219 crore (US$47.89 million)
Dabangg 2	21 December 2012	₹50 crore (US$9.36 million)	₹253.54 crore (US$47.45 million)
Dabangg 3	20 December 2019	₹178 crore (US$25.28 million)	₹230.93 crore (US$32.79 million)
Total		₹269 crore (US$29 million)	₹703.47 crore (US$75 million)

== Reception ==
Each film is linked to the "Critical response" section of its article.

Film	Rotten Tomatoes
Dabangg (2010)	60% (6/10 average rating) (5 reviews)
Dabangg 2 (2012)	33% (5.1/10 average rating) (12 reviews)
Dabangg 3 (2019)	18% (3.7/10 average rating) (17 reviews)

== Awards ==
Dabangg received accolades in major film award functions in India. Among them, it won a National Film Award for the Best Popular Film Providing Wholesome Entertainment. It was given six awards at the 56th Filmfare Awards, including one for Best Film, seven Screen Awards, nine Zee Cine Awards and ten IIFA Awards. Dabangg 2 also received several awards.

== Influence ==
Many other film characters are inspired by the character Chulbul Pandey.

== Remakes ==
- Osthe (Tamil remake of Dabangg)
- Gabbar Singh (Telugu adaption of Dabangg)
