= Pramod Khanna =

Indian film actor and producer

- Occupations: Actor, Producer

Pramod Khanna is an Indian actor and producer. He is Vinod Khanna's brother and uncle to Rahul Khanna and Akshaye Khanna. He has little appearance on screen although due to his resemblance to his brother, he was cast in Dabangg 3. He was the president of Indian Rugby Football Union too.

== Biography ==
Khanna produced a Hindi film titled Farebi which was released in 1974. He played the role of "Prajapati Pandey", father of protagonist "Chulbul Pandey" in Dabangg 3 which was earlier played by his brother Vinod Khanna in Dabangg and Dabangg 2 who died in 2017. "It sure feels good. Doing something which my late brother did. It is thrilling to be essaying the same role". He said when he joined the cast.

== Filmography ==
=== Producer ===
Year	Film
1974	Farebi

=== Actor ===
Year	Film	Role
2019	Dabangg 3	Prajapati Pandey
