= Ethirum Puthirum =

1999 film by Dharani

- Poster
- Directed by: V. C. Ramani
- Written by: E. Ramdoss (dialogues)
- Screenplay by: V. C. Ramani
- Story by: E. K. Maharajan
- Produced by: G. S. Madhu
- Starring: Mammootty; Napoleon; Sangita; Manorama
- Cinematography: A. Karthik Raja
- Edited by: B. S. Nagarajan
- Music by: Vidyasagar
- Production company: Madhu Film Internationals
- Release date: 4 March 1999
- Running time: 165 mins
- Country: India
- Language: Tamil

Ethirum Puthirum (transl. Different puzzles) is a 1999 Indian Tamil-language action-drama film directed by Dharani under his real name V. C. Ramani. Produced by G. S. Madhu, the film stars Mammootty, Napoleon, Sangita, and Manorama, while Goundamani, Senthil, and Nassar play supporting roles. The music was composed by Vidyasagar with editing by B. S. Nagarajan and cinematography by A. Karthik Raja. The film released on 4 March 1999, and won the Tamil Nadu State Film Award for Third Best Film.

== Plot ==
Kannan, an upright district collector, is tasked with a sensitive mission when Veeraiyan, a terrorist leader, kidnaps a prominent female political figure. Veeraiyan agrees to release her only if his injured brother, Arasappan, receives proper medical care and is safely returned. The government consents and assigns Kannan to oversee Arasappan’s recovery.

Initially, Arasappan despises Kannan for representing the government against which his brother is fighting. However, the compassion shown by Kannan’s wife, Selvi, and his mother gradually softens his hostility. Just as Arasappan begins to change, events take a darker turn: without Kannan’s approval, the police launch an assault on Veeraiyan’s camp in the forest. Enraged, Arasappan nearly retaliates but is restrained by Kannan.

The police then accuse Kannan of collusion with the terrorists, citing Arasappan’s escape from his custody and Kannan’s criticism of their unauthorized raid. As a result, Kannan’s wife and mother are arrested. Determined to prevent further suffering for Kannan’s family, Arasappan voluntarily surrenders. Despite his surrender, the police refuse to show him mercy.

== Cast ==
- Mammootty as Collector Kannan
- Napoleon as Arasappan
- Sangita as Selvi
- Manorama as Kannan's mother
- Goundamani as Auto Driver
- Senthil as Eshwar
- Nassar as Veeraiyan
- Charan Raj as Devaraj
- Radhika as Dr. Jayanthi
- Sangili Murugan as Panchayat Thalaivar
- Uday Prakash as Inspector
- Ra. Sankaran as Doctor
- Shanmugasundaram
- Madhan Bob
- Kumarimuthu
- Pushpavanam Kuppusamy
- Raju Sundaram (special appearance in "Thottu Thottu Pesum Sultana")
- Simran (special appearance in "Thottu Thottu Pesum Sultana")

== Production ==
Ethirum Puthirum is the directorial debut of Dharani. The film was initially titled Master and production delays postponed the film's release by a couple of years. Soundarya was the original choice for the female lead role, while the item number done by Simran was initially offered to actress Rambha, who wanted better pay.

== Soundtrack ==
Music was composed by Vidyasagar and the lyrics were penned by Vairamuthu. The song "Thottu Thottu Pesum Sultana" became a chartbuster, and received renewed attention after featuring in Good Bad Ugly (2025).

Track listing
No.	Title	Singer(s)	Length
1.	"Thottu Thottu Pesum Sultana"	Swarnalatha, Pushpavanam Kuppusamy	4:44
2.	"Kathu Pasanga"	Pushpavanam Kuppusamy, Malaysia Vasudevan, Anuradha Sriram, Gopal Rao	5:06
3.	"Nilavonnu Pathikichhu"	Hariharan, Swarnalatha	4:40
4.	"Maruthaani Thottu"	Sujatha Mohan, Malaysia Vasudevan	4:32
5.	"Ellorukkum Oru"	Gopal Rao	3:34
Total length:			22:38

== Release and reception ==
The film was initially scheduled to release on 19 October 1998 to coincide with Diwali, but was delayed by five months. Prior to the theatrical release of the film, pirated copies were released and streamed on television, which ultimately affected the profitability of the film. D. S. Ramanujam of The Hindu wrote, "Though the crux of Maharajan's story is simple, the director, with his screenplay, ably supported by E. Ramdass's dialogue, has worked out enough absorbing situations." The film won the Tamil Nadu State Film Award for Third Best Film.
