= Bangaram (film) =

- Theatrical release poster
- Directed by: Dharani
- Screenplay by: Dharani
- Dialogues by: Siva Akula
- Story by: Dharani
- Produced by: A. M. Ratnam
- Starring: Pawan Kalyan; Meera Chopra; Sanusha; Ashutosh Rana
- Cinematography: S. Gopinath
- Edited by: V. T. Vijayan
- Music by: Vidyasagar
- Distributed by: Sri Surya Movies
- Release date: 3 May 2006
- Running time: 176 minutes
- Country: India
- Language: Telugu

Bangaram (transl. Gold) is a 2006 Indian Telugu-language action comedy film written and directed by Dharani and produced by A.M. Ratnam, who previously produced Kushi (2001). It stars Pawan Kalyan in the titular role alongside Meera Chopra, Sanusha, and Ashutosh Rana, while Mukesh Rishi, Raja, and Reema Sen play supporting roles. The music was composed by Vidyasagar with cinematography by S. Gopinath and editing by V. T. Vijayan. The film released on 3 May 2006.

== Plot ==
Bangaram is a reporter at a news channel who dreams of getting into an international news channel of BBC. To fulfill his dream, he needs Peddi Reddy's signature, but gets entangled with his daughters Sandhya and Vindhya. Later, Bhooma Reddy wins over Peddi's heart and convinces him to marry Sandhya to his brother, but Sandhya already has her own love story with Vinay. Bangaram, feeling guilty about foiling Sandhya's escape plan and the mean looks from Vindhya, decides to help her by taking her to the city. Later, Vinay also loses contact with them due to confusion caused by a bomb blast. Bangaram finds Vinay with the help of a taxi driver and his company. Bhooma and his goons chase them, but each time, Bangaram saves Sandhya and Vinay. Unable to capture Sandhya, Bhooma kidnaps Vindhya and blackmails Bangaram that his brother will marry her if Sandhya is not returned. Bangaram goes to Bhooma, kills him and his henchmen, and saves Vindhya. In the end, it is revealed that Bangaram ultimately finds his own love during return train journey.

== Cast ==
- Pawan Kalyan as Bangaram
- Meera Chopra as Sandhya Reddy
- Sanusha as Vindhya Reddy
- Ashutosh Rana as Bhooma Reddy
- Mukesh Rishi as Peddi Reddy
- Sreedhar Rao as Konda Reddy
- Raja as Vinay
- Reema Sen as Reporter
- Tanikella Bharani as Channel Chief
- Raghu Babu as Driver
- Ali as Priest
- Arun Behll as Bodo Militant
- Venu Madhav as Sathish
- Vincent Asokan as Shankar Singh
- Srinivasa Reddy as Vinay's friend
- Santhoshi as Bhooma Reddy's wife
- Shakeela as Ammukutty
- AVS as Sri Narayana Varma
- Karate Raja as Bhooma Reddy's henchman
- M. S. Narayana as Villager
- L. B. Sriram as Parrot Astrologer
- Dharmavarapu Subramanyam as Train Ticket Examiner
- Madhan Bob as Punjabi
- Vellai Subbaiah as Politician
- Trisha as Dhanalakshmi, Bangaram's Tamil-speaking love interest (special appearance)
- Rachana Maurya as an item number in "Chedugudante"

== Production ==
The muhurat shot of the film took place on 23 January 2004 at Annapoorna Studios.

== Soundtrack ==
Bangaram

Soundtrack album by Vidyasagar
- Released: 16 March 2006
- Recorded: Varsha Vallaki Studios
- Genre: Feature Film Soundtrack
- Length: 21:45
- Language: Telugu
- Label: Aditya Music
- Producer: Vidyasagar

Vidyasagar chronology
Thambi (2006)	Bangaram (2006)	Em Magan (2006)

The music for this film has been composed by Vidyasagar. The audio of the film was launched on 16 March 2006 at a silent function arranged at Sunethra School for Blind at Pedda Amberpet in the outskirts of Hyderabad on the evening of 16 March. Tamil actor Vijay attended as the chief guest.

Song title	Singers	Lyricist	Duration
"Jai Shambo Shambo"	Tippu, Mirchi Ajay, Dharani	Bhuvanachandra	04:07
"Yegire Chilakamma"	Udit Narayan, Anuradha Sriram	Bhuvanachandra	04:38
"Ra Ra Bangaram"	Tippu, Manikka Vinayagam	Bhuvanachandra	02:41
"Maro Masti Maro"	Sukhwinder Singh, Anuradha Sriram	Bhuvanachandra	04:17
"Ra Ra Bangaram" (Remix)	Pravin Mani, H. Sridhar	Bhuvanachandra	02:24
"Chedugudante"	KK, Anuradha Sriram, Sahithi, Dharani	Sahithi	04:19

== Reception ==
A critic from The Hindu wrote that "Though the subject is interesting, the director fails to handle it properly". A critic from Sify wrote that "On the whole, there is neither sense nor style in this helter-skelter endeavour". Kishore of Nowrunning rated the film three out of five stars and wrote that "In Bangaram, Pawan Kalyan proves that he is not hailed as the 'power star' for nothing". A critic from Full Hyderabad wrote that "One of the more thoughtless films to come out of the Telugu movie stables, this one is so supremely devoid of any soul, it makes you want to give some of yours to it, even if non-refundable".
