= KAD Movies =

KAD Entertainment
- Company type: Private
- Industry: Entertainment
- Founded: Hyderabad, India in 2000
- Headquarters: Hyderabad; Singapore; New Jersey, India; Singapore
- Key people: Deepak Gurnani (chairman); Kanyalal Gurnani (Vice Chairman)
- Products: Films; Music; Video products
- Subsidiaries: Sneha Music; PULP DVD; I Dream DVD; KAD Movies
- Website: www.kaddvd.com

KAD Movies is a Telugu films production and distribution company specializing in release Telugu films in African countries.

KAD Entertainment had acquired brands such as SPV and Idream to expand its reach on DVD.

== Distributor - filmography ==
- Maska (2009) ... Distributor (2009) (worldwide)
- Parugu (2008) ... Distributor (2008) (theatrical)
- Don (2007 film) (2007) ... Distributor (2007) (USA)
- Chandamama (2007) ... Distributor (2007) (DVD)
- Classmates (2007 film) (2007) ... Distributor (2007) (USA) (theatrical)
- Sainikudu (2006) ... Distributor (2006) (USA) (theatrical)
- Stalin (2006 film) (2006) ... Distributor (2006) (USA) (theatrical)
- Ashok (film) (2006) ... Distributor (2006) (USA) (DVD), Distributor (2006) (USA) (theatrical)
- Godavari (film) (2006) ... Distributor (2006) (USA) (DVD)
- Pournami (2006) ... Distributor (2006) (USA) (DVD), Distributor (2006) (USA) (theatrical)
- Devadasu (2006) ... Distributor (2006) (USA) (DVD)
- Jai Chiranjeeva (2005) ... Distributor (2005) (USA) (theatrical), Distributor (2006) (USA) (DVD)
- Vennela (2005) ... Distributor (2006) (worldwide) (DVD)
- Andhrudu (2005) ... Distributor (2005) (USA) (DVD)
- Super (2005 film) (2005) ... Distributor (2005) (USA) (DVD)
- Subash Chandra Bose (film) (2005) ... Distributor (2005) (USA) (DVD)
- Chakram (2005) ... Distributor (2005) (USA) (DVD)
- Mass (film) (2004) ... Distributor (2004) (USA) (DVD)
- Anand (2004 film) (2004) ... Distributor (2005) (USA) (DVD)
- Ela Cheppanu (2003) ... Distributor (2003) (worldwide) (DVD) (except India)
- Aadi (2002) ... Distributor (2002) (USA) (DVD)
- Kalusukovalani (2002) ... Distributor (2002) (USA) (DVD)
- Gitanjali (1989) ... Distributor (1989) (worldwide) (DVD) (Non-India)
- Tagore (film)(2003) ... DVD, Audio Release (USA release)
- Velugu Needalu (1961) ... VCD Release
- Kalasi Vunte Kaladu Sukham (1961) ...
- Johnny
- Gudumba Shankar
- Nuvve Nuvve
- Nuvvu Naaku Nachav
- Adavi Ramudu
- Chatrapathi (film)
- Jai Chiranjeeva
- Sri Manjunatha

== Production company - filmography ==
- Stalin (2006) ... Production Company
