= Kaise Bani =

Famous Bhojpuri folksong

Kaise Bani or Phulauri Bina chutney kaise bani (Bhojpuri: फुलउरी बिना चटनी कइसे बनी; IAST: phulaurī binā chaṭnī kaïse banï; Lit.: How will phulauri be made without Chutney) is a highly influential song rooted in traditional Bhojpuri Music, which gained international fame through adaptations in the Chutney music genre. Originally reflecting the folk traditions of the Bhojpuri region of India, its journey through the Indian diaspora, particularly in Trinidad and Tobago, transformed it into a symbol of Indo-Caribbean cultural identity and musical innovation. It was first modernized and popularized internationally by Trinidadian singer Sundar Popo, becoming one of the earliest major hits in Chutney music. This song got immense popularity after that and remade by many different artists and used in albums and films like Ghar ki Izzat (1994), Dabangg 2 (2012).

== Origin and meaning ==
This Bhojpuri Folk song went to Trinidad and Tobago along with the indentured labourers (Girmityas), who were taken to British colonies to work in sugarcane fields from Bhojpuri speaking region of India. These folk traditions, often performed by women during private wedding ceremonies (matikoor, gamat), formed the foundation from which public Chutney music emerged in the late 1960s and 1970s. In 1969 Sundar Popo released an album named Nana and Nani in which this song was mixed with English lyrics and music was also fused with Caribbean music. After this Babla & Kanchan recreated this song and released in 1982.

The hookline "Phulauri bina chutney kaise bani" literally translates to, "How will the phulauri be made without chutney?". Phulauri (or Pholourie) is a traditional Bhojpuri/Indo-Caribbean snack, a deep-fried ball made typically from ground split peas or gram flour, almost always served with a chutney (a type of condiment). The line implies that one is incomplete or pointless without the other. Within the context of Bhojpuri folk songs, references to food items like phulouri and chutney can sometimes carry sexual innuendos.

== Sundar Popo Song ==
"Kaise Bani"

Song by Sundar Popo

from the album Nana and Nani
- Released: 1969
- Genre: Chutney music

First modernized version of this folk song was released by Sundar Popo in Chutney music genre in his hit album Nana and Nani in 1969. Music in this song was the fusion of Bhojpuri folk and Caribbean pop. The lyrics was funny yet dark and was in English except the hookline which was in Bhojpuri.

== Kanchan & Babla Song ==
In 1982, Babla & Kanchan recreated the song by Sundar Popo.

== Other versions ==
- The tune of this song was used in the 1994 song Rajāï Binā Ratiyā kaïse katī from the Bollywood film Ghar Ki Izzat, sung by Usha Mangeshkar and Jayshree Shivram.
- This song was also recreated in the album Aara Hile Chhapra Hile, with the title Phulauri Bina Chutney Kaise bani sung by Kalpana Patowary and written by Vinay Bihari.
- This song was recreated with the name Chatni kaise bani in the album Aagre Ka Ghaghra released by T-Series and sung by Anjali Jain.
- This song was also remade which was sung by Mamta Sharma and Wajid Ali in the movie Dabangg 2 (2012) starring Salman Khan. This version significantly curtailed the original English lyrics, removed specific Trinidadian references (like the kudari and Sangre Grande, changing the airplane fall location from a cane field to a train), making the English verses function more as generic, humorous code-mixing within an Indian context.
