= Farebi =

- Directed by: Suresh Issar; Sudesh Issar
- Produced by: Pramod Khanna
- Release date: 1974
- Country: India
- Language: Hindi

Farebi is a 1974 Bollywood drama film directed by Suresh Issar and Sudesh Issar.

== Cast ==
- Vinod Khanna as Shanker 'Ranjit'
- Moushumi Chatterjee as Dr. Meera
- Nirupa Roy as Maa Annapurna - Ranjit's mother
- Anwar Hussain as SevakRam - Chacha
- Jankidas as Manoharlal
- Randhir as Vishwas Jindal
- Ranjeet
- Bindu
- Fariyal as Mona
- C S Dubey as Murari

== Music ==
1. "Ae Mere Dil Khushi Se Machal" - Kishore Kumar
2. "Jab Suni Ho Gali Hogi Khuli Khidki" - Asha Bhosle
3. "Mujh Preet Jataani Na Aayi Na Aayi" - Lata Mangeshkar
4. "O Maiya Beta Tujhko Pukaare Bholi Ma" - Narendra Chanchal
5. "O Sherawaaliye Teri Jai Pahaadawaaliye Teri Jai" - Narendra Chanchal
6. "Tu Kaun Hai Main Kaun Hoon Phir Tera Mera Saath Hai" - Lata Mangeshkar
