= Malaika Arora =

Indian actress and dancer (born 1973)

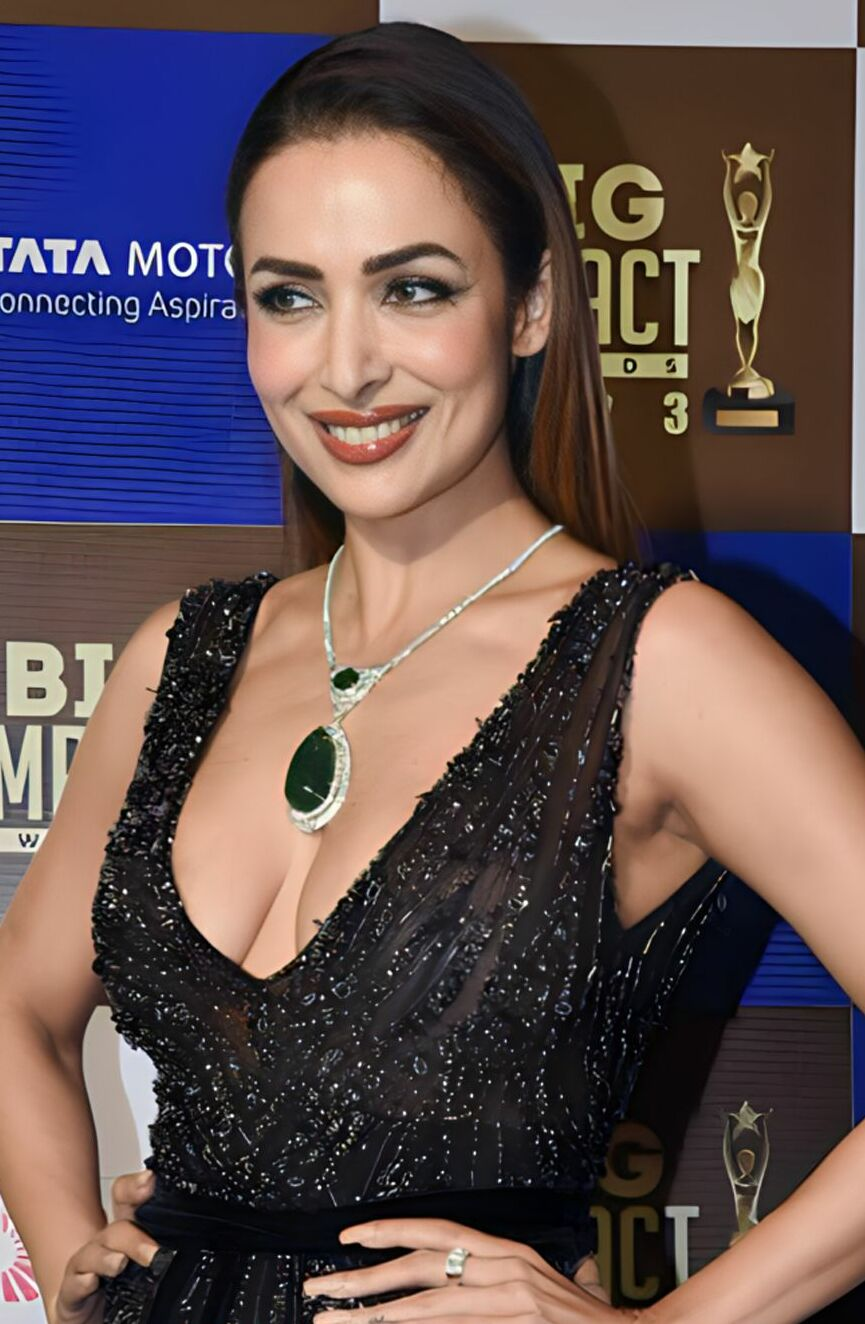
- Arora in 2023
- Born: 23 October 1973 (age 52); Thane, Maharashtra, India
- Other name: Malaika Arora Khan
- Occupations: Actress; dancer; model; VJ; television presenter
- Years active: 1997–present
- Spouse: Arbaaz Khan (m. 1998; div. 2017)
- Children: 1
- Relatives: Amrita Arora (sister)

Malaika Arora (born 23 October 1973) is an Indian actress, dancer, model, video jockey, and television personality who appears in Hindi-language films. Known for her various supporting roles and item numbers since the late 1990s, Arora is cited in the media as a fitness icon.

She made her debut as a film producer in 2008 with her former husband Arbaaz Khan, founding the company Arbaaz Khan Productions, which created the Dabangg film series. As an actress, she has starred in films like Kaante (2002) and EMI (2008). She also performed in the music videos of the songs "Chaiyya Chaiyya" (1998), "Gur Naalo Ishq Mitha" (1998), "Maahi Ve" (2002), "Kaal Dhamaal" (2005) and "Munni Badnaam Hui" (2010).

== Early life and background ==
Malaika Arora was named after the Swahili word malaika meaning "angel". She was born in Thane, Maharashtra. Her mother, Joyce Polycarp, is a Malayali Christian, and her father, Anil Arora, was a Punjabi Hindu from the Indian border town of Fazilka who worked in the Indian Merchant Navy. Her parents divorced when she was 11 years old, and she moved to Chembur with her sister Amrita and mother, who raised them as a single mom. Her father shared a respectful relationship with the family.

She completed her secondary education at Swami Vivekanand School in Chembur. She lived in Borla in Sindhi Society, Chembur before starting her modelling career.

== Career ==
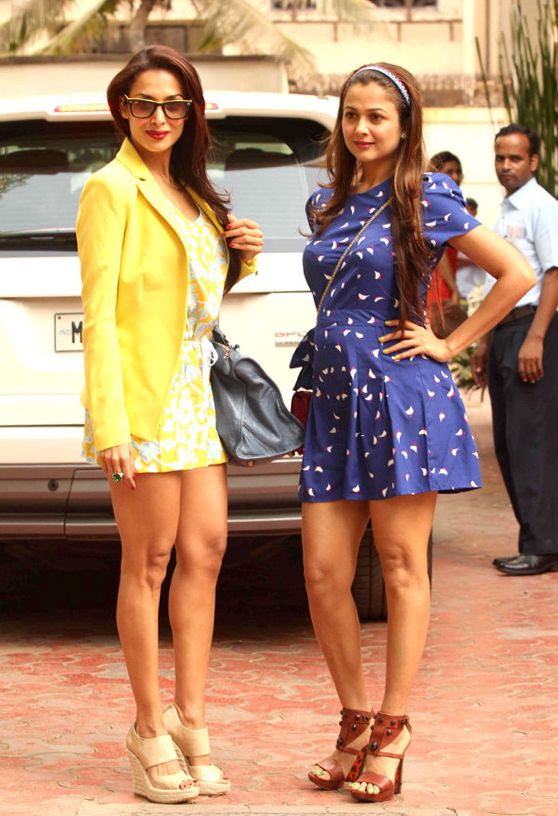
Malaika Arora (left) with her sister Amrita Arora, 2012

Arora was selected as a VJ for MTV India when its operations began. She worked as an interviewer, hosting shows such as Club MTV, and later co-hosting the shows Love Line and Style Check with Cyrus Broacha. Malaika then entered the modelling world, appearing in many advertisements, as well as album songs like Bally Sagoo's "Gur Naalo Ishq Mitha" opposite Jas Arora, and item numbers such as "Chaiyya Chaiyya" in the 1998 Bollywood film Dil Se...

In 2010, she featured in the item song "Munni Badnaam Hui" in the film Dabangg, which was produced by her former husband Arbaaz Khan. On 12 March 2011, she helped set a world record with 1235 participants performing a choreographed dance to "Munni Badnaam" which she led.

She was the Taiwan Excellence celebrity endorser in 2012. She endorsed Dabur's 30-Plus. She states that she never wanted to do acting. She performed live alongside Atif Aslam, Shaan and Bipasha Basu in a series of concerts at LG Arena in Birmingham and The O2 Arena in London. In 2014, she confirmed that she would make a cameo appearance in the Farah Khan-directed action comedy-drama film Happy New Year.

=== Television ===
Malaika appeared on the television show Nach Baliye as one of the three judges. The show was aired on STAR One in mid-2005. She continued as a judge in Nach Baliye 2, which began airing in late 2006. In this show, she performed many item numbers as an example for the contestants. She appeared on the show Zara Nachke Dikha as a judge on STAR One. She was a judge on the show Jhalak Dikhhla Jaa in 2010.

Malaika is on the judges panel in the show India's Got Talent. She was the judge and host of the MTV Supermodel of the Year in 2019, and a judge of India's Best Dancer in 2020.

== Personal life ==
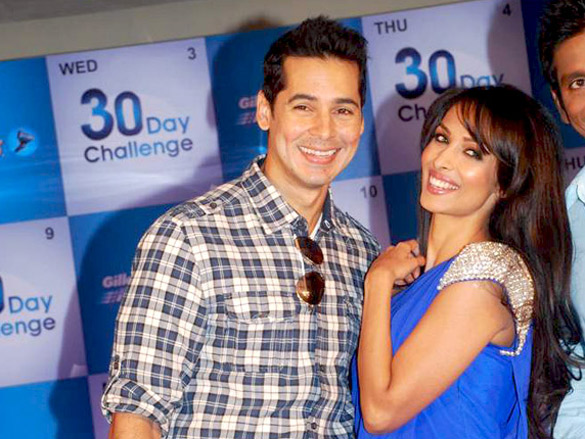
Arora with partner Dino Morea

Arora was married to Bollywood actor-director-producer Arbaaz Khan in 1998, after she met him during a coffee ad shoot. From her marriage with Khan until they got divorced, she was known as Malaika Arora Khan. On 28 March 2016, they announced their separation, citing compatibility issues. The couple officially divorced on 11 May 2017. Together they have a son, Arhaan Khan, born on 9 November 2002. After the divorce Arora maintained primary custody of their son, while Khan received visitation rights, as per the settlement reached in the Bandra Family Court. Bollywood actor Salman Khan and actor-director-producer Sohail Khan are her former brothers-in-law. Her former father-in-law was scriptwriter Salim Khan.

Arora entered into a relationship with actor Arjun Kapoor in 2016. Arora and Kapoor broke up in 2024. Arora began a relationship with Dino Morea in early 2025. She became a vegan in 2020.

In April 2022, she had an accident on the Mumbai–Pune Expressway when three cars collided with each other as she was returning home from an event. She was taken to the Apollo Hospital in Navi Mumbai where she received stitches. Her stepfather Anil Mehta died by suicide in 2024.

== Filmography ==
=== As actress and dancer ===
- 1997: Gur Nalon Ishq Mitha
- 1998: Dil Se - special appearance in song "Chaiyya Chaiyya"
- 1999: Pyar Ke Geet - special appearance in song "Rangilo Maro Dholna"
- 2000: Bichhoo - special appearance in song "Ekwari Tak Le"
- 2001: Indian - special appearance in song "Yeh Pyar"
- 2002: Maa Tujhhe Salaam - special appearance in song "Sone Ke Jaisi Hai Meri Jawaani"
- 2002: Kaante as Lisa
- 2005: Kaal - special appearance in song "Kaal Dhamaal"
- 2007: Heyy Babyy - special appearance in song "Heyy Babyy"
- 2007: Athidhi - special appearance in song "Rathraina" (Telugu film)
- 2007: Om Shanti Om - special appearance in song "Deewangi Deewangi"
- 2007: Welcome - special appearance in song "Hoth Rasiley"
- 2008: EMI as Nancy
- 2009: Helloo India
- 2010: Prem Kaa Game - special appearance in song "I Wanna Fall in Love"
- 2010: Housefull as Pooja
- 2010: Dabangg - special appearance in song "Munni Badnaam Hui"
- 2012: Gabbar Singh - special appearance in song "Kevvu Keka" (Telugu film)
- 2012: Housefull 2 - special appearance in song "Anarkali Disco Chali"
- 2012: Dabangg 2 - special appearance in song "Pandey Ji Seeti"
- 2014: Happy New Year - cameo appearance as herself
- 2015: Dolly Ki Doli - special appearance in song "Fashion Khatam Mujh Par"
- 2018: Pataakha - special appearance in song "Hello Hello"
- 2022: An Action Hero - special appearance in song "Aap Jaisa Koi"
- 2023: Kho Gaye Hum Kahan - herself (cameo)
- 2024: Yek Number - special appearance in song "Majha Yek Number"
- 2025: Thama - special appearance in a song "Poison Baby"

=== As producer ===
- 2010: Dabangg – Filmfare Award for Best Film, National Film Award for Best Popular Film Providing Wholesome Entertainment
- 2012: Dabangg 2
- 2015: Dolly Ki Doli

=== Television ===
| Year | Name | Role | Notes/Ref. |
|---|---|---|---|
| 1997 | Club MTV | Host | |
| 1999 | MTV Loveline | Host | |
| 2002 | Femina Miss India | Host | With her two co-host Raageshwari and Rajeshwari Sachdev |
| 2002 | MTV Style Check | Host | |
| 2004 | Style Mantra | Host | |
| 2005–2006 | Nach Baliye | Judge | season 1–2 |
| 2008 | Zara Nachke Dikha | Judge | |
| 2008 | Dhoom Macha De | Host | |
| 2008 | Nachle Ve with Saroj Khan | Herself | |
| 2009 | Perfect Bride | Judge | |
| 2010;2015;2023–2024 | Jhalak Dikhhla Jaa | Judge | seasons 4, 8, 11 |
| 2012–2018;2022; 2025 - | India's Got Talent | Judge | season 4–8, 11, guest judge in season 9 |
| 2015 | Swaragini | Herself | |
| 2015–2016 | Power Couple | Host/presenter | |
| 2017–2018 | India's Next Top Model | Judge | season 3–4 |
| 2019–2021 | MTV Supermodel of the Year | Judge | |
| 2020–2022 | India's Best Dancer | Judge | |
| 2020–2022 | Fabulous Lives of Bollywood Wives | Herself | Guest Appearance |
| 2021 | Prag Cine Awards | Herself | Guest Appearance |
| 2022 | Moving in With Malaika | Herself | |
| 2026 | Famously Fit with Sophie | Herself | Special Guest |

== Awards ==
- National Film Award for Best Popular Film Providing Wholesome Entertainment (producer) - Dabangg (2010)
- Filmfare Award for Best Film (producer) - Dabangg (2010)
