= Dabangg 3 =

2019 Indian film by Prabhu Deva

- Theatrical release poster
- Directed by: Prabhu Deva
- Screenplay by: Prabhu Deva; Salman Khan; Alok Upadhyay
- Dialogues by: Dilip Shukla; Alok Upadhyay
- Story by: Salman Khan
- Produced by: Salman Khan; Arbaaz Khan; Nikhil Dwivedi
- Starring: Salman Khan; Sudeepa; Sonakshi Sinha; Saiee Manjrekar; Arbaaz Khan
- Cinematography: Mahesh Limaye
- Edited by: Ritesh Soni
- Music by: Songs: Sajid–Wajid; Score: Sandeep Shirodkar
- Production companies: Salman Khan Films; Arbaaz Khan Production; Saffron Broadcast & Media Limited
- Distributed by: Salman Khan Films (India); KJR Studios (Tamil Nadu); Yash Raj Films (International)
- Release date: 20 December 2019
- Running time: 148 minutes
- Country: India
- Language: Hindi
- Box office: ₹ 230.93 cr

Dabangg 3 (transl. Fearless 3) is a 2019 Indian Hindi-language action drama film directed by Prabhu Deva and jointly produced by Salman Khan Films, Arbaaz Khan Productions and Saffron Broadcast & Media Limited. The third installment in the Dabangg film series, it is a prequel to Dabangg (2010) and Dabangg 2 (2012). The film stars Salman Khan, Sudeepa, Sonakshi Sinha, Saiee Manjrekar and Arbaaz Khan. It also features Pramod Khanna, Dimple Kapadia and Mahesh Manjrekar in supporting roles. Written by Salman, the story follows corrupt cop Chulbul Pandey's journey of conflict when he comes across an old ruffian, Bali Singh, whose plain sight refreshes his memory in a trudge down the past, unaware that this can affect the present and the future in more ways than one.

Principal photography begun in April 2019 and was completed in September 2019.

Dabangg 3 was theatrically released worldwide on 20 December 2019, on the Pre-Christmas weekend, in Hindi, and dubbed in Tamil, Telugu, and Kannada languages. It became the first Hindi film to be released in Kannada after the ban on Kannada dubbed films in Karnataka was removed. The film received negative reviews from critics, who panned its screenplay, direction, and writing, but praised the performances of Salman Khan and Sudeepa. The film's collections were allegedly affected by the CAA protests, making it the lowest-grossing film in the franchise.

== Plot ==
Starting again with a heroic antic, the story moves ahead from Dabangg 2 with the corrupt yet much-loved cop, ASP Chulbul Pandey, preventing a robbery at a wedding, and beating the goons and their leader, Gullu, black and blue. Gullu then agrees to return to his former part-time job as a wedding band trumpeter, and Chulbul Pandey is seen dealing with the everyday lives of his wife Rajjo, brother Makhanchand "Makkhi" Pandey, also a police officer, and his son, while his father Prajapati Pandey stays at home with Rajjo. Makkhi appears to be enjoying a lavish lifestyle most of the time. One fateful day, a despaired girl, probably injured, arrives in a hurry at Makkhi's station after escaping from somewhere and seeks help; Makkhi, expecting to punish her captors, who tried to sell her and other girls off, is joined by Chulbul, and after a scuffle, the brothers arrest Chinti Walia, who runs a prostitution racket.

While trying to force a confession out of Chinti at the police station, Chulbul intercepts a lawyer and some goons who have come over to release Chinti. Still, he tears off the court order, and in desperation, the leader of the goons keeps his video call going on even as Chulbul smiles into the screen. Minutes later, the leader shows the video call to Bali Singh, who sees Chulbul, who looks back into the phone camera to visit Bali. Shocked beyond words, he reminisces his younger days, recalling his fate with Bali.

Years ago, when he was still young, Chulbul, whose real name turns out to be Dhaakad Chand Pandey, fell in love with a girl, Khushi, who was initially being considered as a potential bride for Makkhi, after he noticed a photo of her in Makkhi's hand, and told his mother, Naini Devi, that he would be a good fit instead of Makkhi; a few days later, Khushi's maternal uncle Prabhat and maternal aunt Janki agreed to the match between Dhaakad and Khushi, and the two began courting each other. At the same time, Bali, a ruthless and violent goon, set his eyes on Khushi and started making arrangements for his marriage with her. However, when he saw Dhaakad with Khushi, he decided to kill Khushi and her family right in front of Dhaakad's eyes after luring him to the spot. Prabhat and Janki were both killed, and Khushi was thrown off a cliff to die. Consequently, Hariya and his daughter Rajjo revealed to be Khushi's friend, were deeply affected; Hariya took to alcoholism, while Dhaakad, who was framed by Bali and spent much time in prison for the death, was taken in by Commissioner Satendar Singh after saving him from attackers, and transformed into an uptight cop, naming himself Chulbul, in Khushi's memory, forming the events of Dabangg.

At present, Chulbul, having relayed this entire episode to Prajapati and Rajjo, decides that he has had enough, and he needs to close the chapter once and for good. Meanwhile, an ill-attracted Makkhi is misled by Bali into turning against Chulbul, nearly slapping him after he too is promoted to the rank of ASP. The action causes him to be banished from home by Prajapati, and he joins hands with Bali actively. Bali, who is set to become a politician and a minister in the upcoming elections, plans to bring in a truck filled with money. Thus, he gets Makkhi and many other police officers in his circle transferred to one common location to facilitate transportation. Chulbul intercepts the truck and turns Bali's moles in the police force against Bali himself. As revenge, Bali gets several of Chulbul's associates kidnapped and brutally beaten to near death until Chulbul breaks in again and frees them all, even when Bali has run away with Makkhi and some reliable accomplices.

Seeking to lure Bali into counterproductive action, Chulbul kidnaps Minister S. S. Sharma and his brother-in-law by staging a ploy with Gullu's help and forcing a confession of them, which is made viral. Bali notices the same, and Makkhi helps him track them down since he recognizes the hideout. Upon arriving there, Bali kills Sharma and injures his brother-in-law; in retaliation, he sends wrestlers to attack Rajjo and her son, but Chulbul arrives in time to save the two.

Sometime later, Chulbul receives a call from Prajapati, who tells him that Rajjo hasn't arrived home. Sensing Bali's hand in the matter, he invades a quarry where Bali has held Rajjo, and surprisingly, Makkhi himself, as hostages – Makkhi was always on Chulbul's side, and it was a game by the brothers to incense Bali; after an intense fight, Chulbul kills Bali by impaling him on a metal spike. He then buries Bali in the rubble.

== Cast ==
- Salman Khan as A.S.P. Chulbul Pandey IPS/ Dhaakadchand "Dhaakad" Pandey
- Sudeepa as Balwant "Bali" Singh (ex-convict)
- Sonakshi Sinha as Rajjo Pandey
- Saiee Manjrekar as Khushi Chautala
- Arbaaz Khan as Makhanchand "Makkhi" Pandey
- Pramod Khanna as Prajapati Pandey (Note: Prajapati Pandey was originally portrayed by Pramod Khanna's brother Vinod Khanna in the first two films. Pramod was cast after Vinod died in 2017 due to their resemblance.)
- Dimple Kapadia as Naini Devi Pandey
- Nawab Shah as Gulkand "Gullu" Manek
- Rajesh Sharma as Minister Suryadhar Sharma
- Dev Gill as Baljeet "Bablu" Singh
- Sharat Saxena as Commissioner Satwinder Singh
- Paresh Ganatra as Saurabh Devasthal
- Medha Manjrekar as Janki Saigal
- Ali as Constable Rajveer "Raju" Khandeshi
- Besant Ravi as Bali's goon
- Amit Shivdas Nair as Girl's Kidnapper
- Deepraj Rana as Bali's goon
- Naresh Gosain a Guest at the wedding
- Tunisha Sharma as hostile girl

=== Cameo appearances ===
- Mahesh Manjrekar as Hariya Shreshawat
- Dolly Bindra as Chinti Walia
- Sohail Khan as Police Officer Rohit Kumar Sharma
- Warina Hussain as a bar dancer in the item song "Munna Badnaam Hua"
- Prabhu Deva as himself in the item song "Munna Badnaam Hua"

== Production ==
=== Development ===
In 2013, it was reported that Dabangg 3 will be a prequel. In 2014, during the promotion of his production Dolly Ki Doli director of the series Arbaaz Khan confirmed that Dabangg 3 will indeed happen and that the pre-production of it will start soon. He added: "It has to be an out-of-the-box idea, only then we can think of making it into a film. Dabangg 3 will not be about the story being carried forward but something very different coming in the way." In March 2015, Arbaaz Khan said that he may not direct Dabangg 3 due to the high workload of being a producer, actor, and director. In April 2015, Arbaaz Khan said that the film may take one or two years to shape up as it was postponed due to Sultan. After much speculation, It is confirmed in August 2016, that Sonakshi Sinha will be part of Dabangg 3 and another actress might join her.

Later in that month, it was reported that Kajol was offered the role of an antagonist, but she refused to play it, as she told the media that "her role was not as strong as that of Salman".

In October 2017, it was reported that the writers had started scripting the film, and it would go on floors by mid-2018. In the following month, it was confirmed by Arbaaz Khan that Prabhu Deva would direct the film, and he will look after the creative control. As of March 2018, Deva confirmed that he will direct the film and Salman Khan, Sonakshi Sinha and Arbaaz Khan will portray their earlier respective character. Sajid–Wajid will again compose for the film soundtrack. On 31 March 2019, Salman and Arbaaz arrived in Indore to begin shooting for Dabangg 3 on 1 April.

=== Filming ===
Principal photography began in April 2019 in Indore, Madhya Pradesh. The film's title track was shot in Maheshwar. Filming was completed in October 2019 in Jaipur.

== Soundtrack ==
Dabangg 3

Soundtrack album by Sajid–Wajid
- Released: 13 November 2019
- Recorded: 2019
- Genre: Feature film soundtrack
- Length: 27:53
- Language: Hindi
- Label: T-Series

Sajid–Wajid chronology
Pagalpanti (2019)	Dabangg 3 (2019)	Radhe (2021)
External audio
- Official Audio Jukebox on YouTube

The film's music is composed by Sajid–Wajid while lyrics are written by Jalees Sherwani, Danish Sabri, Sameer Anjaan, Sajid Khan and Irrfan Kamal. The album, originally recorded in Hindi features six songs and was released on 13 November 2019 by T-Series.

The track "Hud Hud" featured in both Dabangg and Dabangg 2 and was recreated in the film. The version in Dabangg 3 borrows lyrics and music heavily from a previous Sajid-Wajid composition, "Rab Ka Banda", from the soundtrack of the 2008 film Hello. The dance number, "Munni Badnaam Hui" was guest-written and guest-composed by Lalit Pandit from 2010 original and was recreated as "Munna Badnaam Hua".

No.	Title	Lyrics	Singer(s)	Length
1.	"Hud Hud"	Jalees Sherwani, Danish Sabri	Divya Kumar, Shabab Sabri, Sajid Khan	4:25
2.	"Naina Lade"	Danish Sabri	Javed Ali	4:49
3.	"Yu Karke"	Danish Sabri	Salman Khan, Payal Dev	3:45
4.	"Munna Badnaam Hua"	Danish Sabri, Badshah	Badshah, Kamaal Khan, Mamta Sharma	4:08
5.	"Awara"	Sameer Anjaan, Sajid Khan	Salman Ali, Muskaan	4:56
6.	"Habibi Ke Nain"	Irfan Kamal	Shreya Ghoshal, Jubin Nautiyal	5:51
Total length:				27:53

== Release ==
Before some months of filming, Dabangg 3 was said to be scheuled to release on 5 June 2020 coinciding with Eid-ul-Fitr. However, when it was announced that Inshallah, another film starring Khan, was shelved, the release date of Dabangg 3 was advanced to 20 December 2019, coinciding with Christmas.

The film was theatrically released in India on 20 December 2019 in Hindi, along with dubbed versions in Tamil, Telugu, and Kannada languages. The film was later made available for streaming on Amazon Prime Video in Hindi and dubbed languages of Telugu, Tamil, and Kannada.

== Critical response ==
On the review aggregator website Rotten Tomatoes, 18% of 17 critics' reviews are positive, with an average rating of 3.7/10.

Harshada Rege of The Times Of India rated the film 3 out of 5 stars and wrote "The film has all the ingredients required for a massy masala entertainer — good action, music, drama and, of course, Salman packing all of this in one story". Vaibhavi V Risbood of Pinkvilla rated the film 2.5 out of 5 stars and wrote "The third installment of Dabangg franchise delves into the backstory of what made Chulbul Pandey the loveable cop from the hinterlands". A critic for Bollywood Hungama rated the film 2.5 out of 5 stars and wrote "DABANGG 3 is a predictable revenge saga which capitalises on the star power of Salman Khan". Shubhra Gupta of The Indian Express rated the film 1.5 out of 5 stars and wrote " Dabangg 3, which has a long back-story of how Chulbul came to be called Chulbul, is not just a dreary mish-mash of the previous ones, it is also a cringe-fest".

== Box office ==
Dabangg 3's opening day domestic collection was ₹24.50 crore. On the second day, the film collected ₹24.75 crores. On the third day, the film collected ₹31.90 crores, taking the total opening weekend collection to ₹81.15 crores.

As of 10 January 2020, with a gross of est. ₹178 crores in India and ₹40 crores overseas, the film has a worldwide gross collection of est. ₹218 crores.
