= Dharani (director) =

Indian film director and screenwriter

- Born: V. C. Ramani
- Occupation: Film director Screenwriter
- Years active: 1999–2011

Dharani (born V. C. Ramani) is a former Indian film director and screenwriter who primarily worked in Tamil cinema as well as directing one Telugu film. He is best known for directing the hat-trick action films, Dhill (2001), Dhool (2003), and Ghilli (2004).

== Career ==
He pursued English literature degree at Loyola College then learnt editing at film institute. He also owned an orchestra under the name Dilip Ramani. After his diploma in film technology, he assisted six directors.

He first directed the film Ethirum Pudhirum, loosely based on forest brigand Veerappan and his younger brother's death, starring Mammootty. Political controversies ensured its delayed release in 1999. It received critical acclaim and was awarded second place in the Tamil Nadu State Film Award for Best Film. The film's producer T. Ajay kumar made Dharani the director of his next production, starring Vikram, Dhill. The film was a box-office success and his next film Dhool, produced by A. M. Rathnam in 2003, again with Vikram along with Jyothika and Reemma Sen, was a box office success. He worked with A. M. Rathnam again for the film Ghilli starring Vijay and Trisha, that was a blockbuster movie and a comeback movie in Vijay's career. It was followed by Telugu film Bangaram, featuring Pawan Kalyan in the lead. In 2008, he directed Kuruvi, rejoining the lead cast of Ghilli. Unlike the previous success in Ghilli, Kuruvi was an sleeper hit at the box office after completion of 150 days. In 2011, he remade the 2010 Hindi film Dabangg in Tamil as Osthe, with Silambarasan in the lead role, which was again declared an average hit.

Dharani announced that he would make a Telugu sports-based film titled Merupu with Ram Charan Teja and Kajal Aggarwal, and the film had an official launch in late April 2010. The film progressed slowly throughout 2010 and was later shelved by 2011. He has not directed any film since.

== Filmography ==
- All films are in Tamil, unless otherwise noted.

Year	Film	Notes			
Year	Film	Notes	1999	Ethirum Pudhirum	Tamil Nadu State Film Award for Third Best Film
2001	Dhill				
2003	Dhool				
2004	Ghilli	Remake of Okkadu			
2006	Bangaram	Telugu film			
2008	Kuruvi				
2011	Osthe	Remake of Dabangg; screenplay writer, also appeared as himself in the song "Osthe Maamey"			

Singer

- "Thaarumaaru" (Uchathula Shiva)

=== Recurring collaborations ===
List of Dharani recurring collaborations
Film	Vidyasagar	S. Gopinath	V. T. Vijayan	Ashish Vidyarthi	Vivek	Trisha
Ethirum Pudhirum (1999)	Yes					
Dhill (2001)	Yes	Yes	Yes	Yes	Yes	
Dhool (2003)	Yes	Yes	Yes		Yes	
Ghilli (2004)	Yes	Yes	Yes	Yes		Yes
Bangaram (2006)	Yes	Yes	Yes			Cameo
Kuruvi (2008)	Yes	Yes	Yes	Yes	Yes	Yes
Osthe (2011)		Yes	Yes			
