= Osthe =

2011 film by S. Dharani

- Theatrical release poster
- Directed by: Dharani
- Screenplay by: Dharani
- Dialogues by: Bharathan
- Story by: Abhinav Kashyap; Dileep Shukla
- Based on: Dabangg by Abhinav Kashyap
- Produced by: T. Ramesh
- Starring: Silambarasan; Richa Gangopadhyay; Santhanam; Jithan Ramesh; Sonu Sood
- Cinematography: Gopinath
- Edited by: V. T. Vijayan
- Music by: Thaman S
- Production company: Balaji Real Media
- Distributed by: Reliance Entertainment
- Release date: 8 December 2011
- Running time: 155 minutes
- Country: India
- Language: Tamil

Osthe (Tamil pronunciation: [ost̪i]; transl. Pinnacle) is a 2011 Indian Tamil-language action comedy film directed and co-written by Dharani. A remake of the 2010 Hindi film Dabangg, it stars Silambarasan, Richa Gangopadhyay, Santhanam, Jithan Ramesh and Sonu Sood. The film follows a police officer, Osthe Velan and his troubled relationship with his stepfather and half-brother. He seeks to take down a corrupt politician, who exploits the hostility between Velan and his stepfamily for his personal gain.

Produced by Balaji Real Media, the film began production in June 2011 and ended that November. It was shot mainly in Mysore, with sporadic schedules in Chennai. The music was composed by Thaman S, with cinematography by Gopinath and editing by V. T. Vijayan. The film was released in theatres on 8 December 2011.

== Plot ==
Velan, a young boy, lives with his mother, younger half-brother Balan, and stepfather Subbaiah Pillai, whom he despises. Fifteen years later, Boxer Daniel, a corrupt politician, attempts to bribe the residents of 14 villages to win the by-election. When Daniel's goons try to distribute the money, Velan, now a police officer named Osthe Velan, confronts them and seizes the funds. Velan still harbours hatred towards his stepfamily. Balan falls in love with Nirmala, but his father disapproves due to a loan he took to start an oil mill, which he can only repay if Balan marries a wealthy woman.

Meanwhile, Daniel becomes enraged when he learns the money has not been distributed and attempts to contact his goons. The goons mistakenly go to the Kattupakkam Police Station while searching for Velan's house, leading to a chase between them and the police team. During the pursuit, Velan falls in love with Neduvalli, whose father is a drunkard. Daniel tries to retrieve the money with the collector's support, but Velan refuses to return it and mocks him instead. Daniel confronts Velan at the check post, but Velan displays his attitude, irritating Daniel. Daniel hires a contract killer to eliminate Velan.

Balan steals the money from Velan to marry Nirmala and gives it to her father, who accepts their marriage. Velan asks for Neduvalli's hand in marriage, but she declines, citing her need to care for her ailing father. Upon returning home, Velan discovers his mother's lifeless body. At her funeral, he unsuccessfully urges his stepfather and brother to reconcile. A fight ensues between the contract killer's goons and Velan at the railway station, resulting in the contract killer's death. Velan deceives the Police Commissioner, claiming the contract killer was hiding to assassinate Daniel.

Daniel devises a plan to make Velan his bodyguard, but it fails. Velan asks Neduvalli's father to allow him to marry her, and he agrees, sacrificing himself since his daughter would not accept while he was alive. Velan then takes Neduvalli to Balan's wedding, interrupts the ceremony, and marries Neduvalli instead. Subbaiah Pillai is now ashamed of him, but Velan confronts him aggressively. Daniel requests Minister Kalaipandian to suspend Velan, but Kalaipandian requires a valid reason. Balan assaults an employee due to a small mishap at his father's factory, leading to Velan beating up Balan. The people of Kattupakam demand Velan's suspension, prompting him to apologise to Balan.

Kalaipandian informs Velan of his suspension, but Velan aligns himself with Kalaipandian, leading to the revocation of the suspension order. Velan poisons Daniel's adulterated alcohol and raids the location where Daniel is present, confiscating the additional money. In retaliation, Daniel sets fire to Subbaiah Pillai's factory, resulting in a heart attack. Needing to pay for his father's operation, Balan becomes Daniel's henchman and is told to give a fruit basket to Kalaipandian at his house. Unknown to Balan, Daniel has placed a bomb inside the basket, which explodes after Balan leaves, killing Kalaipandian and Constable Masanamoorthy.

Daniel instructs Balan to kill Velan, but Balan refuses, and Velan fakes his death. The next day, Velan visits Subbaiah Pillai in the hospital and pays for his operation. Daniel praises Balan but reveals that he murdered Velan's mother, takes Balan hostage, and engages in a fight with Velan. Velan rescues Balan and both suffocate Daniel to death with the exhaust pipe of a tractor. Balan later marries Nirmala.

== Cast ==
- Silambarasan as Inspector Osthe Velan
- Richa Gangopadhyay as Neduvaali (Voice dubbed by Chinmayi)
- Santhanam as Constable Selvam
- Jithan Ramesh as Balan
- Sonu Sood as Boxer Daniel
- Vijayakumar as Minister Kalaipandian
- Nizhalgal Ravi as Thangaperumal
- Nassar as Subbaiah Pillai
- Revathi as Velan and Balan's mother
- Saranya Mohan as Nirmala
- Thambi Ramaiah as Constable K. Masanamoorthy
- Mayilsamy as Constable Sennamadan
- Vaiyapuri as Constable Seethapathi
- Azhagam Perumal as Shankaralingam
- VTV Ganesh as Neduvaali's father
- John Kokken as Local Don
- Bala Singh as District Collector
- Aadukalam Naren as Police Commissioner Alexander
- Mallika Sherawat as Mallika (special appearance in the song "Kalasala")
- Nagesh Krishnamoorthy as the astrologer
- Bava Lakshmanan as Veeralingam
- Chaplin Balu
- Bonda Mani
- Kottachi
- Vellai Subbaiah
- Hello Kandasamy
- Karate Raja as Boxer Daniel's henchman
- Senthi Kumari as Masanamoorthy's wife
- J. Ram as Boxer Daniel's henchman
- Rithu Mangal as a journalist
- Robert (in the song "Neduvaali")
- Dharani as himself (in the song "Osthe Maamey")

== Production ==
=== Development ===
By February 2011, the production company Balaji had acquired the rights to remake the Hindi film Dabangg (2010) in Tamil. Producer T. Ramesh revealed that actor Silambarasan urged him to do so and recommended Dharani as director. While the screenplay was written by Dharani, the dialogues were written by Bharathan, cinematography was handled by Gopinath and editing by V. T. Vijayan. Kalyan and Robert served as the dance choreographers, while Ram Lakshman, Kanal Kannan and Silva served as the action choreographers.

=== Casting ===
Richa Gangopadhyay was cast as the lead actress after Dharani was impressed with her performance in the Telugu film Mirapakay (2011). Sonu Sood reprised his role from the original as the antagonist. VTV Ganesh, after acting with Silambarasan in Vinnaithaandi Varuvaayaa (2010) and Vaanam (2011) was signed to play the role played by Mahesh Manjrekar in the original. A number of actresses were considered for appearing in the film's item number. Silambarasan and Dharani wanted either Katrina Kaif or Vidya Balan, but neither actress was able to accommodate dates. Sood expressed interest in seeing Bipasha Basu in the role, but Mallika Sherawat was eventually cast.

=== Filming ===
The film was launched with a puja at AVM Studios in Chennai on 10 May 2011, and filming began on 26 June in Mysore. Nearly all of the film was shot in and around Mysore in a single shooting schedule, which was finished by mid-August. Silambarasan began a fitness regime with Sood serving as his coach. Gangopadhyay put on weight for Osthe and shot for the film simultaneously with Mayakkam Enna (2011) which she considered "hectic". Sherawat began filming for the item number "Kalasala" from late September in Chennai. In late October, the song "Pondatti" was filmed in Dubai, and the climax was filmed in Chennai shortly thereafter. Filming ended in November.

== Music ==
Osthe's soundtrack album and background score were composed by Thaman S. Silambarasan said that composer Yuvan Shankar Raja, with whom he usually collaborates, had suggested signing Thaman as music composer. The music rights were acquired by Sony Music India. The audio launch was held on 19 October in Chennai. Vijay, who had worked with Dharani in Ghilli (2004) and Kuruvi (2008), was the guest of honour and unveiled the audio CD.

Pavithra Srinivasan of Rediff.com praised the soundtrack's "mildly appealing combination of masala beats", rating it 2.5 out of five. Karthik of Milliblog wrote that the soundtrack "is high on masala, the kind Thaman reserves for Telugu, topped by the standout Kalasala!". The linez "Zarda Beeda" in "Kalasala Kalasala" were changed to "Bombay Halwa" post release for certain broadcasts. Elements of "Kalasala Kalasala" were sampled in "Don't Sell Out" by the British rapper Tinie Tempah.

Track listing
| No. | Title | Lyrics | Singer(s) | Length |
|---|---|---|---|---|
| 1. | "Kalasala Kalasala" | Vaali | L. R. Eswari, T. Rajendar, Solar Sai | 4:12 |
| 2. | "Pondaati" | Silambarasan | Silambarasan | 4:26 |
| 3. | "Osthi Maamey" | Vaali | Thaman S, Baba Sehgal, Rahul Nambiar, Ranjith, Naveen Madhav | 3:54 |
| 4. | "Unnale Unnale" | Yugabharathi | Thaman S, Rita | 3:47 |
| 5. | "Neduvaali" | Yugabharathi | Rahul Nambiar, Mahathi | 4:21 |
| Total length: | | | | 20:40 |

== Release ==
Osthe was initially scheduled to release in theatres on 18 November 2011 but was pushed by a week to 25 November due to production delays caused by heavy rain. The film eventually released on 8 December. Prior to release, an attempt was made to stop the film's release over unpaid dues. Separately, a pro-Tamil organisation named Tamizh Kappu Kazhagam (TKK) objected to the film's title, alleging it was not a pure Tamil term, but the title remained unchanged. It was distributed by Reliance Entertainment.

== Critical reception ==
A reviewer from The New Indian Express said, "Unfortunately it's unable to recreate the same magic of the earlier version, the film a passable routine masala entertainer" and the film lacked the punch in original. A Deccan Chronicle reviewer gave the film three stars and said, "Osthe is worth watching once." Malathi Rangarajan of The Hindu said, "If Dabangg could make it, Osthe should! And if Salman could do it, so can STR." Pavithra Srinivasan of Rediff.com rated the film two out of five, stating, "Osthe lacks the magic that made Dabangg work." Sify called it a "time-pass entertainer."
