= Daraar =

- Poster
- Directed by: Abbas–Mustan
- Screenplay by: Sachin Bhowmick
- Dialogues by: Aadesh K. Arjun
- Produced by: Sujit Kumar
- Starring: Juhi Chawla; Rishi Kapoor; Arbaaz Khan
- Cinematography: Thomas A. Xavier
- Edited by: Hussain A. Burmawala
- Music by: Score: Sandeep Chowta; Songs: Anu Malik
- Production companies: Shree Shivbhakti Films, Venus Records & Tapes
- Distributed by: Eros Entertainment
- Release date: 5 July 1996
- Running time: 145 minutes
- Country: India
- Language: Hindi
- Budget: ₹4.50 crore
- Box office: ₹10.97 crore

Daraar (transl. Crack) is a 1996 Indian Hindi-language romantic psychological thriller film directed by Abbas-Mustan starring Juhi Chawla, Rishi Kapoor and Arbaaz Khan in his film debut. Khan received the Filmfare Best Villain Award for his portrayal as a possessive husband. The plot is inspired from 1991 American film, Sleeping with the Enemy.

== Plot ==
Vikram is an overly suspicious and abusive husband. He can't control his anger and rage and continuously beats his newly-wed wife, Priya, even going to the point of murdering a doctor who treated Priya and was trying to help her blind mother. One day, Vikram and Priya go to celebrate her birthday on a boat. But the boat gets stuck in a storm and Priya escapes during the mayhem. Vikram thinks that she drowned underwater. Instead, she runs away to Shimla by swimming back to shore.

There, she meets Raj Malhotra. He falls in love with her, but she always pulls away from him. Later, when she gets sick of him following her, she asks her mother what she should do. Her mother asks her to reveal to him the truth about her marriage. Then it will be his choice to accept her or not. Priya writes him a letter about her past life. She asks Hari to give it to Raj. Hari misplaces the letter and gets someone to write a new one. Raj gets this other letter which contains nothing but a poem. When he finds out she is married, he leaves her. After Hari finds the original letter, he gives it to Raj. Raj falls in love with Priya again and decides to marry her.

One day, Vikram sees Priya's picture in the newspaper and finds out that she is alive. He cancels his ticket for Goa and goes to Shimla. In Shimla, he searches for her. On finding out that she is getting married, he tries to kill Raj but fails. So he sends Raj to prison instead, by falsely accusing him of attempted murder. Later, he goes to Priya's house and kills her friend and attempts to kill Priya as well.

In the climax, Vikram gets into a fight with Raj after the latter proves his innocence and tries to save Priya from being killed by Vikram. Raj drowns Vikram in a bathtub full of water. While Vikram supposedly dies, Raj and Priya run to a nearby rail station. Vikram attacks them again and pushes Raj. There, Vikram's foot gets stuck on a railway track as he is chasing Priya. Seeing this, Priya tries to save Vikram as a train is approaching them fast. She tells him to move and runs to save him. Seeing Priya's love for him despite his abusive behaviour, he pushes her away just before the train runs him over, saying "Today I free you from all bonds". The movie ends with Vikram being hit by the train leaving his shoe behind.

== Cast ==
- Juhi Chawla as Priya Bhatia, Vikram's wife and Raj's fiancée
- Rishi Kapoor as Raj Malhotra, a wealthy industrialist, Priya's betrothed
- Arbaaz Khan as Vikram, Priya's possessive and abusive husband
- Prithvi Vazir as Dr. Sen
- Sulabha Arya as Nirmala Bhatia, Priya's blind mother
- Sushma Seth as Mrs Malhotra, Raj's mother
- Johny Lever as Hari, servant of the Malhotra family
- Razak Khan as Bedang Lucknowi Shayar
- Tiku Talsania as Police Inspector
- Dinesh Hingoo as Maulana in a bus
- Shiva Rindani as Rony
- Sheela Sharma as Asha
- Dinyar Contractor as the real estate agency's manager

== Songs ==
Music was directed by Anu Malik, while the background score was directed by Sandeep Chowta.

#	Song	Singer	Lyricist
1.	"Yeh Pyar Pyar Kya Hai"	Abhijeet, Kavita Krishnamurthy	Rahat Indori
2.	"Aisi Mili Nigahen"	Kumar Sanu, Alka Yagnik	Rani Malik
3.	"Deewana Deewana"	Abhijeet, Sadhana Sargam	Rahat Indori
4.	"Tu Hi Meri Manzil"	Kumar Sanu, Alka Yagnik	Rahat Indori
5.	"Ek Ladki Mera Naam"	Udit Narayan, Alka Yagnik	Rahat Indori
6.	"Maine Kaha Chal"	Udit Narayan, Alka Yagnik	Hasrat Jaipuri
7.	"Main Hi Main"	Shankar Mahadevan, Alka Yagnik	Majrooh Sultanpuri
8.	"Tera Chand Chehra"	Kumar Sanu, Alka Yagnik	Shaheen Iqbal

== Awards and nominations ==
=== 42nd Filmfare Awards ===
- Nominated - Filmfare Award for Best Actress - Juhi Chawla
- Filmfare Award for Best Villain - Arbaaz Khan
