= Jai Chiranjeeva =

- Poster
- Directed by: K. Vijaya Bhaskar
- Written by: Screenplay: K. Vijaya Bhaskar; Story & Dialogues: Trivikram Srinivas
- Produced by: C. Aswani Dutt
- Starring: Chiranjeevi; Sameera Reddy; Bhumika Chawla; Arbaaz Khan
- Cinematography: Venu
- Edited by: Kotagiri Venkateswara Rao
- Music by: Mani Sharma
- Distributed by: Vyjayanthi Movies
- Release date: 22 December 2005
- Running time: 173 minutes
- Country: India
- Language: Telugu

Jai Chiranjeeva is a 2005 Indian Telugu-language action comedy film directed by K. Vijaya Bhaskar and produced by Vyjayanthi Movies. The film stars Chiranjeevi, Sameera Reddy, Bhumika Chawla, and Arbaaz Khan. The film's music was composed by Mani Sharma with the editing by Kotagiri Venkateswara Rao and cinematography by Venu. The film was released on 22 December 2005. The film was remade in Bangladeshi as Ziddi Mama (2012), starring Shakib Khan, Apu Biswas and Rumana.

== Plot ==
Pasupathi, an arms dealer, arrives in India to supply a new batch of weapons, including the .35 Magnum, to his associates. He is stopped because of a routine check, but manages to escape from the officer by shooting him with the new weapon and bribing his associates (the other officers) to keep the truth from being uncovered.

Pasupathi meets his partner Ramakoti and his other associates, including Asghar, Ramakoti's henchman. He shows the latest weapon, which can also be connected to a computer, chooses one of its targets (a young girl on a swing), and then locks it (even indicating that the weapon is not rigid). Ranjan, one of the partners, remarks that it is like a game, to which he replies that it is not a game, and then shoots her. He concludes that the girl is dead, but her soul is not. Ramakoti then manages to take care of that matter by giving the task to Asghar.

10 months later, in a train, some ruffians try to harass a girl, but are interrupted by a passenger who beats them after his sleep is interrupted. One of their allies, who was getting ready, is afraid that the passenger might beat him too; he lies that he knows them and nothing else, taking the responsibility to admit his allies to a hospital. The passenger advises him to follow his sayings. He also tells the girl to wake him up in case of an emergency.

Venu, a friend of the passenger, gets involved in a no-ticket case while waiting for the latter's arrival. The passenger is revealed to be Sathyanarayana Murthy, who rescues his friend from being arrested. He lies about having chest pain and hence consults a doctor, M. V. Shankara Rao, whom he actually threatens with killing him unless he gives information. Venu witnesses this, but later pretends as if nothing happened in front of him. Sathya and Venu visit Venu's colony. Sathya later encounters Sailaja, who thinks that he is a tailor. Venu brags that Sathya is a billionaire to save the latter from a police case.

During the preparations of Ganesh Chaturthi, Sathya falls off the apartment roof while discussing something with Venu. He bumps into Sailaja, while causing so many things, and finally is safe. The next day, Sathya and Venu go to a red-light area and meet Rasul, who informs them about the supply of arms and Asghar after taking each amount from the duo. Sathya goes alone to Asghar's hideout and brawls with his henchmen, even though the latter escapes.

Sathya and Venu start boozing before learning that they are about to have dinner in Sailaja's apartment. Eventually, they manage to hide their drunkenness, but they are caught red-handed by Sailaja's father after Sathya starts washing his left hand instead of his right. Teaming with her friends, Sailaja decides to teach them a lesson by hosting Venu's birthday party at a pub. Sailaja eventually tells Sathya to dance while Venu starts boozing and looking at them. After the party is over and they walk out of the club, Sathya witnesses a beggar beating his daughter for not begging properly. He saves her from the beggar after beating him and gives her all his money for her basic needs. He then starts speaking about how he dislikes watching children in trouble, eventually telling about finishing someone who killed his loved one. Sailaja asks Venu if Sathya loved someone earlier. Venu tells her about Sathya's niece.

Past: Sathya is a rough but kind man living in Amalapuram with his niece Lavanya, mother, sister, and brother-in-law. Sathya and Lavanya share a special bond and are the best of friends. Lavanya's mother, worried that Lavanya will become illiterate like her uncle, talks about admitting her to a convent school. Sathya, initially reluctant, agrees after talking to Lavanya. One day, after getting admitted to a school and roaming out with her family, Lavanya falls off a swing in a park and dies before getting to the hospital. The doctor, who tried to treat her later, discovered this. Asghar suddenly appears and tells him that she was hit by a bullet, revealing that his boss (Pasupathi) wanted to kill a dog instead (since he wanted to test his weapon), but the child became the target. Pasuapathi bribes him with 5 lakh rupees for not telling the truth (or else he would have been killed) and acting for an operation, which was a ruse by Asghar. After the doctor says he could not save her, Sathya, along with the rest of her family, mourns her death. 10 months after Lavanya's death, the family members, except Sathya, had moved on. They met Sai and his daughter, who is now bald-shaven and is revealed to have been operated on for a critical condition. After Sathya's mother tells her that Lavanya did not have her head shaven, Sai even tells that someone might have bluffed them, because of which Sathya later sets out to seek revenge, also asking the doctor about the cause of Lavanya's death. The doctor eventually reveals everything to him (indicating why he took an appointment as a ruse and threatened him).

Present: Jeeva, Ramakoti, and the henchmen kidnap Rasul after finding out that he is the informer. Meanwhile, Sailaja later starts developing feelings for Sathya after a turn of events. The next day, Sathya and Venu go to find Rasul for getting information. He tells them that Asghar and his men had changed their address after that brawl. He is revealed to be missing a left leg, also revealing that Jeeva had chopped it off, and telling Sathya to teach them a lesson, concluding that it will be a fee for him. They go back to the colony and find that Asghar and his gang are waiting for them. Sathya takes all the men down, snaps Jeeva's right leg (as payback for what he did to Rasul), and threatens Asghar that he will kill his boss in two months, leaving the goons injured, and moves out of the colony. After discovering all this, Pasupathi returns from LA and discusses everything with Ramakoti. He then discovers that the doctor also knows about this matter.

Neelima, a US citizen and the doctor's daughter, comes to visit her family. Neelima and her father jog in a park where Pasupathi suddenly appears and meets the latter, while the former is knocked down unconscious after bringing a water bottle. Pasupathi will leave Neelima on one condition: he will jog around the tree 1000 times, which is nearly impossible for her father, though he agrees. He completes a round of 100 and dies because of a cardiac arrest. Pasupathi tries to kill Neelima but stops because of Ramakoti's advice and walks away. Neelima's family is shattered after her father's death.

Sathya and Venu move on to a new address, thinking that the former does not want to trouble the residents of the colony. Sathya even learns about the doctor's death, and his daughter being the witness to it. He overcomes several obstacles and eventually meets Neelima, who is initially reluctant to take some actions, but teams up with him. They get hold of Ramakoti through the electoral list. Sathya gets hold of Dhanushkoti, Ramakoti's son, and kidnaps him. Ramakoti and his henchmen get hold of Sathya and injure his toe, but later want to know where Dhanush actually is, discovering that he gave a wrong address, leading Ramakoti to call Pasupathi for a video meeting. Pasupathi reveals all his illegal activities to Sathya and challenges him to do whatever he wants. It is revealed that Venu and Dhanush had arrived at the latter's home. Sathya takes care of those who wanted to kill him. He takes a phone and calls a number, indicating the phone bomb's signal, and blasts the house, causing Ramakoti to cry out loud, but it is revealed that his son is already safe, and Sathya overpowers the other men. Ramakoti eventually reveals where his boss lives. Venu calls Sathya's family to the town where he is presently residing. Though his mother and brother-in-law are reluctant, Sathya's sister nods her head no (indicating that he should progress ahead).

Driven by a desire for revenge, Sathya wants to travel to the US but faces an obstacle: he is uneducated and unable to obtain a travel visa. Despite his feelings for Sailaja, Sathya ends up marrying Neelima, who holds a US green card, to use her status to gain entry into LA. The story continues to unfold as Sathya and Neelima travel to LA, where Sathya plans to carry out his mission of killing Pasupathi. Pasupathi's bodyguards kidnap Neelima, and Sathya eventually contacts Pasupathi, who is playing some games with him. Sathya eventually notices a poster of Pasupathi on a building after saving a kid from a passing truck, envisioning Lavanya inside her. Sathya gets inside the building, takes down all of his guards, despite learning that he planted a specialized bomb on Neelima. He eventually saves her and kills Pasupathi with that bomb. The film ends with Sathya reuniting with Sailaja and her family, with Venu remarking that he loved and married someone else.

== Cast ==
- Chiranjeevi as Sathyanarayana Murthy alias Sattipandu “Satya”
- Sameera Reddy as Sailaja "Sailu"
- Bhumika Chawla as Neelima "Neelu"
- Arbaaz Khan as Pasupathi (Voiced by P. Ravi Shankar)
- Bramhanandam as Neelima's uncle
- Jaya Prakash Reddy as Ramakoti
- Rahul Dev as Asghar, Pasupathi's henchman (Voiced by P. Ravi Shankar)
- Sunil as Dhanushkoti, Ramakoti's son
- Sumithra as Sathya's mother
- Shriya Sharma as Lavanya, Sathya's niece
- Sujitha as Sathya's sister
- Sameer as Sathya's brother-in-law
- Venu Madhav as Venu, Sathya's friend
- Dharmavarapu Subramanyam as Sailaja's father
- Sudha as Sailaja's mother
- Vizag Prasad as Dr. M. V. Shankara Rao, Neelima's father
- Tanikella Bharani as Visa Agent
- M. S. Narayana as Customs Officer
- AVS as Church Father
- Uttej as Sathya's family friend
- Naramalli Sivaprasad as Ramakoti's assistant
- Ping Pong Surya as Rasool
- Rajitha

== Production ==
The film was launched on Ramanaidu Studios at 9 April 2005. the team has erected a 60 feet idol of Hanuman designed by art director Anand Sai near Gachibowli specifically for the film which took 20 days to be completed. The film's climax and one of the songs were shot in Los Angeles and on the Las Vegas strip, respectively.

== Soundtrack ==
Soundtrack was composed by Mani Sharma. The audio was launched at Shilpa Kala Vedika on 14 November 2005.

Jai Chiranjeeva

Studio album by Mani Sharma
- Released: 14 November 2005 (India)
- Genre: Feature film soundtrack
- Length: 30:58
- Language: Telugu
- Label: Aditya Music
- Producer: Mani Sharma

Mani Sharma chronology
Allari Pidugu (2005)	Jai Chiranjeeva (2005)	Ranam (2006)

All music is composed by Mani Sharma

Track list
No.	Title	Lyrics	Singer(s)	Length
1.	"Jai Jai Ganesha"	Chandrabose	S. P. Balasubrahmanyam, Mallikarjun (Uncredited), Chorus	5:43
2.	"Ko Ko Kodi"	Bhuvana Chandra	Udit Narayan, K. S. Chithra	5:03
3.	"Thumps Up Thunder"	Sirivennela Seetharama Sastry	Mahalakshmi Iyer, Nihal Konduri	5:21
4.	"Thillana"	Sirivennela Seetharama Sastry	Shankar Mahadevan	4:48
5.	"Hey Jana"	Chandrabose, Bhaskarabhatla	KK, Chorus	5:04
6.	"Maha Muddu"	Sirivennela Seetharama Sastry	Shreya Ghoshal, Karthik	5:06
Total length:				30:58

== Home media ==
The DVD of Jai Chiranjeeva was released by KAD Entertainment on February 7, 2006 Telivision Zee telugu

== Reception ==
Sify wrote "Jai Chiranjeeva offers very little by way of surprise and it is the one-man entertainment troupe called Chiranjeevi that salvages this uneven film". Idlebrain wrote "First half of the film is satisfactory with entertainment. There is lag in the second half. [..] Climax should have been handled better. The plus points of the film are Chiranjeevi and comedy dialogues by Trivikram. On the flipside, the main revenge objective of hero was not efficiently projected". Deccan Herald wrote "The only problem is that the script writers seem to have run out of steam and keep repeating the same old stories. And their safest formula is a judicious mix of dance, music, sentiment, and more than anything fights. If the mixture is in correct proportion, the film is a hit. Even if one of these is more or less, the film bombs at the box office. Jai Chiranjeeva offers nothing new. It is a revenge theme retold".

== Awards ==
- Nandi Award for Best Audiographer - Madhusudhan Reddy
