= Abhinav Kashyap =

Indian film director and screenwriter (born 1974)

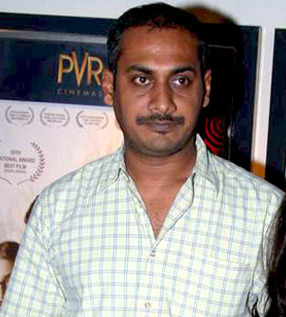
- Kashyap in 2010
- Born: 6 September 1974 (age 52); Obra, Uttar Pradesh, India
- Occupations: Film director; screenwriter
- Years active: 1995–present
- Spouse: Chatura Rao (m. 1997; div. 2017)
- Children: 2
- Relatives: Anurag Kashyap (brother)

Abhinav Singh Kashyap (born 6 September 1974) is an Indian actor, film director and screenwriter, who directed and co-wrote Dabangg (2010) and has worked on several other films in different creative roles.

== Early life and education ==
Kashyap was born on 6 September 1974 in a Gaharwar Rajput family in Obra, Uttar Pradesh where his father worked for the Uttar Pradesh Power Corporation.

He did his primary schooling at the Hillgrange Preparatory School in Dehradun. He is an alumnus of the Scindia School, Gwalior, and completed his graduation in English (Hons) from Hansraj College, University of Delhi in 1995.

He is the younger brother of director Anurag Kashyap.

== Career ==
In 2000, he was involved in writing the script of the film Jung. He worked as an assistant to film maker Mani Ratnam for the film Yuva (2004). He also wrote dialogue for the films Manorama Six Feet Under (2007) and 13B (2009). He made his debut as a director in the 2010 action film Dabangg, which he also co-wrote, along with Dilip Shukla. Bollywood actor Salman Khan and debutant actress Sonakshi Sinha played the lead roles in the film. Dabangg was released on 10 September 2010. His second film Besharam was released on 2 October 2013. Ranbir Kapoor and Pallavi Sharda played the lead roles in the film. It was a critical and commercial failure. He also worked as a boom operator in 2012 short film named The Photograph.

== Controversy ==
=== Allegations against Salman Khan and his family ===
On 15 June 2020, Kashyap released a statement on Facebook on the suicide of actor Sushant Singh Rajput, appealing the Maharashtra government to launch a detailed investigation. He accused Salman Khan, his brothers Arbaaz and Sohail and father Salim of sabotaging his career and bullying him. In response, Arbaaz said that the Khan family has started legal action against Kashyap. When Salim was asked to react to these claims, and he sarcastically said that of course they have ruined his career. Salim said watch his films first and then come to speak to him. Salim further said that Abhinav probably forgot to take his father, Rashid Khan's name along with his forefathers. Salim concluded by saying that Abhinav can do whatever he wants and that he's not going to waste time reacting to these accusations.

In 2025, Kashyap reignited his long-standing dispute with Salman Khan, making several public allegations against him. He described Khan as a goon, ill-mannered, and a bad person, accusing him of being disinterested in acting and merely relying on his celebrity stature. Kashyap also claimed that Khan and his family behave vindictively towards those who disagree with them and asserted that he was sidelined from marketing and credit for the film Dabangg, including being pushed out of its sequel, Dabangg 2. He further alleged that Khan felt insecure about co-star Sonu Sood's physique during Dabangg, and that other casting decisions (e.g., initially proposing Randeep Hooda) were overruled by Khan's family.

== Personal life ==
Kashyap was married to Chatura Rao from 1997 to 2017, they have two daughters.

In 2015, there were rumours of Kashyap being involved with actress Simran Suri.

== Filmography ==
=== Films ===
Year	Title	Director	Screenwriter	Actor	Role(s)	Notes
2000	Jung		Yes			
2003	Paanch			Yes	Salam	
2004	Yuva			Yes	Trilok	Also assistant director
2007	Manorama Six Feet Under		Dialogues			
2009	13B		Dialogues			Also dubbing supervisor
2010	Dabangg	Yes	Yes			
2011	Osthe	No	Yes			story credits; remake of Dabangg
2012	Photograph					Boom operator only
2013	Besharam	Yes	Yes			
2016	The Hatted Room					Short film; editor only
2018	Forsake					Short film; cinematographer only
2019	Wig			Yes	Customer	Short film; also production designer
2025	Nikita Roy					Creative consultant only

=== Television ===
As director only
Year	Title	Notes
1995	Darr	Unknown episodes
2001	Ssshhhh...Koi Hai	Episode: "Mumkin"
2004-2005	Siddhant	Unknown episodes
2005	Dil Kya Chahta Hai	Unknown episodes
2007	Shakira: The End of Evil	Unknown episodes
