= Dabangg 2 =

2012 Indian film by Arbaaz Khan

- Theatrical release poster
- Directed by: Arbaaz Khan
- Written by: Dilip Shukla
- Produced by: Arbaaz Khan; Malaika Arora Khan
- Starring: Salman Khan; Sonakshi Sinha; Arbaaz Khan; Prakash Raj; Vinod Khanna; Mahie Gill
- Cinematography: Aseem Mishra; Mahesh Limaye
- Edited by: Hemal Kothari
- Music by: Songs: Sajid–Wajid; Score: Sandeep Shirodkar
- Production companies: Arbaaz Khan Productions; Stellar Films
- Distributed by: Eros International
- Release date: 21 December 2012
- Running time: 123 minutes
- Country: India
- Language: Hindi
- Budget: ₹50 crore
- Box office: ₹253.54 crore

Dabangg 2 (transl. Fearless 2) is a 2012 Indian Hindi-language action comedy film directed and produced by Arbaaz Khan under Arbaaz Khan Productions. It is a sequel to Dabangg (2010), and the second installment of the Dabangg series. Salman Khan, Sonakshi Sinha, Arbaaz Khan, Mahie Gill and Vinod Khanna reprise their roles, while Prakash Raj, Nikitin Dheer, Pankaj Tripathi, Manoj Pahwa and Deepak Dobriyal appear in supporting roles.

Dabangg 2 was theatrically released in India on 21 December 2012 during the Christmas festival. It earned ₹58.3 crore (US$6.1 million) net in India within three days of its release to break the record of Ek Tha Tiger (2012), another film featuring Salman Khan. Dabangg 2 grossed over ₹253.54 crore (US$26 million) at the worldwide box office, becoming the second highest-grossing Hindi film of 2012 behind Ek Tha Tiger, and one of the highest-grossing Indian films of all time. The film accumulated ₹155 crore (US$16 million) net and was termed a "blockbuster" by Box Office India. The third film in the franchise and a circumquel titled Dabangg 3 was released in December 2019.

== Plot ==
After the events from the previous film, Inspector Chulbul Pandey takes charge of a local police station in Kanpur and resides there with his wife Rajjo, half-brother Makkhi and stepfather Prajapati Pandey. In Kanpur, an assassin murders a witness who is about to testify against a dreaded gangster and politician named Thakur Bachcha Singh.

Chulbul tracks the assassin down, killing him at a coffeehouse. After several public altercations, Bachcha's brother Genda convinces him to get rid of Pandey, threatening Prajapati Pandey to kill his entire family if Chulbul keeps on interfering in Bachcha's illegal activities. Genda harasses a girl at her wedding, where Chulbul arrives and asks Genda to leave. Genda refuses and continues to insult Chulbul, who breaks his neck, leading to his death. Meanwhile, Rajjo becomes pregnant and Chulbul is advised by everybody to leave Bachcha alone for the sake of his family's safety. Bachcha promises to avenge his brother's death before the election but he faces the pressure from his own party to condemn Genda's actions for his own and party's image.

He meets Rajjo and Makkhi while they were leaving a temple. Makkhi is shot by Bachcha and Rajjo is pushed off the temple stairs. Rajjo and Makkhi survive, but Rajjo suffers a miscarriage. Enraged, Chulbul enters Bachcha's location and kills all of his men, including Bachcha. Later, Chulbul and Rajjo bear a baby boy and Chhedi Singh's photographer asks for a family photo. They all laugh and the photographer takes the picture.

== Cast ==
- Salman Khan as Inspector Chulbul "Robinhood" Pandey
- Sonakshi Sinha as Rajjo Pandey
- Arbaaz Khan as Makhanchand "Makkhi" Pandey
- Prakash Raj as Thakur Bachcha Lal Singh, a politician, and the main antagonist (voice dubbed by Chetan Shashital)
- Vinod Khanna as Prajapati Pandey
- Mahie Gill as Nirmala Pandey
- Nikitin Dheer as Chunni, the secondary antagonist, Bachcha's younger brother
- Deepak Dobriyal as Genda Singh, Bachcha's youngest brother
- Gireesh Sahedev as Inspector Siddique
- Manoj Pahwa as Superintendent Anand Mathur
- Flora Asha Saini as a reporter
- Madhumita Das as Raina Tripathi
- Sandeepa Dhar as Anjali Prasad
- Tinu Anand as the master in a special appearance
- Manoj Joshi as a shopkeeper in a special appearance
- Nitesh Pandey as a doctor in a special appearance
- Pankaj Tripathi as Khilawan
- Rashami Desai in a cameo appearance in the song "Dagabaaz Re"
- Nandish Sandhu in a cameo appearance in the song "Dagabaaz Re"
- Achyut Potdar as Beni Prasad, Anjali's Grandfather
- Malaika Arora Khan as Munni, a bar dancer in the item number song "Pandeyji Seeti"
- Kareena Kapoor Khan as a bar dancer in the item number song "Fevicol Se" [choreograph] by Farah khan

== Production ==
=== Development ===
When director Abhinav Kashyap opted out of directing the sequel, Arbaaz Khan himself decided to helm the film. Prakash Raj was confirmed to have been chosen to play the main villain. Kareena Kapoor Khan chose to play an item number in the film, despite initial reports considering Katrina Kaif for the role. (Note: "Katrina Kaif in Dabangg 2?". Dainik Bhaskar. 19 March 2012.)

In Feb 2012, it was reported that distribution rights were sold to UTV Motion Pictures for a price of ₹ 1.40 billion, the highest for a Bollywood film till date. But later UTV Motion Pictures reported the news as completely fake & nonsense. UTV Motion Pictures has brushed aside rumours of purchasing the rights of the sequel to Salman Khan-Sonakshi Sinha starrer, Dabangg 2 for ₹ 1.40 billion. The national emblem framed on the wall of Chulbul Pandey's police station was depicted incorrectly. Sensitive to the slightest abnormality pertaining to national sentiments, the Central Board of Film Certification (CBFC) has asked producer-director Arbaaz Khan to simply blur the corner of the film's frames where the national emblem appears. (Note: "National emblem to be blurred in Dabangg 2 scenes". Movies.ndtv.com. 20 December 2012.)

=== Filming ===
Shooting for the film began in March 2012. The producers announced plans to shoot the film in Kanpur. A set depicting the city of Kanpur was created at the Kamalistan Studios in Mumbai, where the first schedule of the film was shot. The entire studio was rented for the film, making it a first in Bollywood. The phase consisted of shooting a qawwali song under neon lights. Following the shoot, filming is expected to take place in film city in Mumbai. The last schedule has been planned to be shot at Satara. Three days after the film went on floors, it was reported that Salman Khan replaced cinematographer, K. K. Senthil Kumar, with Aseem Kumar. A song titled "Fevicol Se" was choreographed as a dance number and considered as an equivalent to "Munni Badnaam Hui" from prequel. Reports indicating that Salman would essay an important involvement in the director's role were dismissed by Arbaaz. Dabangg 2 was produced on a budget of ₹560 million; ₹170 million were spent on marketing costs of the film.

== Pre-release business ==
Dabangg 2 Pre-release business
Territories and ancillary revenues	Price
Satellite rights with a TV channel	₹45 crore (US$4.7 million)
Overseas & home video rights with Eros International	₹20 crore (US$2.1 million)
Music rights (T-Series)	₹10 crore (US$1.0 million)
Total	₹75 crore (US$7.8 million)

- The figures don't include the Print and Advertising (P&A) costs.

== Music ==
The songs are composed by Sajid–Wajid while the lyrics were penned by Jalees Sherwani, Irfan Kamal, and Sameer. The film score is composed by Sandeep Shirodkar. The full soundtrack album was released on 9 November 2012. One notable track, often referred to as the "Chatni Song" in promotional material and sung by Mamta Sharma and Wajid Ali, is an adaptation of the famous Indo-Trinidadian Chutney song "Kaise Bani" (or "Phulauri Bina Chutney Kaise Bani") by Sundar Popo, which itself has roots in traditional Bhojpuri folk music.The Dabangg 2 version significantly altered the original English lyrics, removing specific Trinidadian cultural and historical references (such as Sangre Grande and the kudari tool) and changing contextual details (e.g., falling into a train instead of a sugarcane field), thereby adapting the song for a mainstream Indian audience and stripping it of its specific diaspora connotations.

== Marketing ==
The first look of the film was unveiled on 19 October 2012 and theatrical trailer was launched on 20 October 2012 at Salman Khan's reality show Bigg Boss 6. Chulbul Pandey, Khan's character in Dabangg 2 appeared in StarPlus soap Diya Aur Baati Hum to promote the film. It aired on 12 and 13 December 2012. Salman and Sonakshi promoted the film on the sets of Sa Re Ga Ma Pa. Dabangg 2 was screened at the Ketnav theatre in Khar, a western Mumbai suburb, on 17 December 2012. A Dabangg 2 special screening was done for the star kids on 19 December 2012. Another premiere was held on 20 December 2012 in which Aamir Khan also attended.

== Release ==
Dabangg 2 released in 3500 screens in India and 450 screens overseas on 21 December 2012. The film was made on a budget of ₹650 million (US$6.7 million) including prints and advertising. This figure does not include Salman Khan's fee which can go as high as the budget of the film itself. Dabangg 2 had the highest screen count for any film in India and worldwide, surpassing that of Ek Tha Tiger. The trailers for Kai Po Che! and Bhaag Milkha Bhaag were released with Dabangg 2.

=== Controversy ===
Chief judicial magistrate (CJM), Muzaffarpur ordered to lodge an FIR against seven artists of Dabangg 2, including Salman Khan, Arbaaz Khan, Kareena Kapoor Khan, Sonakshi Sinha, and others under Section 156 (clause 3) of the CrPC and submit a report within a week in connection with a complaint filed against a song "Fevicol...." in Hindi movie Dabangg 2. The complainant filed the case demanding a ban on the song immediately, claiming that such songs are likely to fuel sexual harassment and misbehaviour against girls at a time when the entire nation was experiencing an unprecedented shame due to the recent gang rape and death of a 23-year-old girl in Delhi.

== Reception ==
=== Critical reception ===
Dabangg 2 received mixed reviews from critics. On the review aggregator website Rotten Tomatoes, 33% of 12 critics' reviews are positive, with an average rating of 5.1/10.

Taran Adarsh of Bollywood Hungama gave the film 4 out of 5 stars and said "Dabangg 2 has Salman Khan, Salman Khan and Salman Khan plus entertainment, entertainment and entertainment in large doses". Resham Sengar of Zee TV rated the film 3.5 out of 5 stars, noting "But the actor cum director has kept the standards of the film intact like a pro. So much so that it was hard to believe that a newbie in film making has directed the film. So, go on and book your ticket to enjoy this paisa vasool film with your friends and family and don't forget to grab a tub of popcorn". Srijana Mitra Das of The Times of India gave the film 3.5 out of 5 stars and praised the overall style. Mid-Day gave it 3 out of 5 stars and said the film was a treat for diehard Salman Khan fans. Rubina Khan of First Post India gave the film 3 out of 5 stars and said it didn't matter what score she gave the film, it would still do great business. Filmfare stated "Dabangg 2 is a fanboy's dream and wouldn't disappoint the first comer either".

Saibal Chatterjee of NDTV gave the film a score 2.5 out of 5 stars reviewing "This film might also end up raking in a much larger box office booty than Dabangg did, but assessed strictly as a pure entertainer designed for instant mass gratification, it isn't half as successful. Unfortunately, the Dabangg 2 screenplay is devoid of any fresh ideas". Gaurav Malani, also from The Times of India gave the film a mixed review and recommended skipping it by "watching reruns of Dabangg on television". Raja Sen of Rediff gave it 2.5 out of 5 stars and felt Dabangg 2 was less unwatchable than its predecessor and it had "absolutely nothing new to offer, and nothing to remember, quote or take away from the theatre". The Indian Express rated the film 2.5 out of 5 stars and said "Arbaaz should have given himself some more time" to make the film watchable. Stardust publishers Manga gave the film 2.5 out of 5 stars also calling it a "one-time watch potboiler". Anupama Chopra of the Hindustan Times gave the film 2.5 out of 5 stars and said Dabangg 2 does not match "the zing of the original" and "there wasn't one line that stayed with me after the film". Rajeev Masand of CNN-IBN gave the film 2.5 out of 5 stars and stated what the "film needed was personality and character, what it's left with is sameness. But that's probably enough for Salman Khan fans".

Aniruddha Guha also of DNA India rated the film 2 out of 5 stars and called it "wannabe-Dabangg". After giving it a 2 out of 5 stars, the Daily Bhaskar panned Dabangg 2 by saying "you'd feel like a moron spending the last day on planet Earth filling your mind and lowering your IQ with rubbish like this". (Note: Movie review: Dabangg 2) Business of Cinema gave the film 2 out of 5 stars and said it was a copy of the original and offered nothing new. Reuters gave it a negative review and raised objections to the content and said the film "objectified women in the worst way possible". Sanjukta Sharma from Live Mint (The Wall Street Journal) said "Dabangg 2 is a disappointment. It had nothing to keep me engaged".

IGN gave the film 4.5 out of 10 stars and criticized the weak script and direction. Mufaddal Fakhruddin wrote, "the screenplay and script are majorly lacking, and whatever story it does have is stretched out in a way that it becomes blatantly obvious. There were a number of times where I went, "why did I just watch this scene?". Dabangg 2 felt lost. They say not all those who wander are lost, but Dabangg 2 actually is. Digital Spy gave the film 2 out of 5 stars and objected to the content. Priya Joshi wrote, "Khan revels in the shameless display of narcissism, but there is little to commend the performance. The dialog is trite, there is no depth to the characters, and most of the effort has been applied to the elaborate fight sequences. With the emphasis on violence and the objectifying of women, it's a step back in time, where the women are either dutiful, temple-going housewives or cleavage-baring prostitutes". Joshi recommended skipping the film and added instead of watching it, we could "use the time, perhaps more wisely, pondering whether we have enough brussels for Christmas dinner". Asian review website Wogma rated the film 1.18 out of 5 and criticized all aspects, from direction to performances by the lead actors. The reviewer broke down the rating of the film and gave "1 out of 5 for direction, 1 out of 5 for the story, 1 out of 5 for lead actors performances, 2 out of 5 for character artists, 2 out of 5 for dialogues, 1 out of 5 for screenplay, 1.5 out of 5 for the music, and 1 out of 5 for lyrics". Simon Abrams of The Village Voice said "before they really screw up [the film], Dabangg 2's creators do a good job of not taking themselves too seriously". Trisha Gupta from First Post International said the film was a rehash of Dabangg. (Note: Movie Review: In Dabangg 2, Salman stuck to old tics Fevicol se) Instead of giving a review, the New York Daily Times objected to the content of the film. Quoting William Nicholas Gomes, a visiting fellow at the University of York, they said Dabangg 2 "glorified the practice of torture by police forces" and would "raise wider public support in favour of torture and ill treatment [of prisoners] in custody".

=== Accolades ===
Distributor	Date aired	Category	Recipient	Result
Zee Cine Awards	20 January 2013	Best Actor (Male)	Salman Khan	Nominated
Zee Cine Awards	20 January 2013	Best Actor- Male (Viewer's Choice)	Salman Khan	Won
Colors Screen Awards	19 January 2013	Best Actor (Male)	Salman Khan	Nominated
Colors Screen Awards	19 January 2013	Best Actor in a Negative Role (Male/Female)	Deepak Dobriyal	Nominated
Colors Screen Awards	19 January 2013	Promising Debut Director	Arbaaz Khan	Nominated
Colors Screen Awards	19 January 2013	Best Music	Sajid-Wajid	Nominated
Colors Screen Awards	19 January 2013	Best Playback Singer (Female)	Mamta Sharma ("Fevicol", Dabangg 2)	Nominated
Colors Screen Awards	19 January 2013	Best Lyrics	Sameer Anjaan ("Dagabaaz re", Dabangg 2)	Nominated
Colors Screen Awards	19 January 2013	Best Dialogue	Dilip Shukla (Dabangg 2)	Nominated
Colors Screen Awards	19 January 2013	Best Choreography	Chinni Prakash ("Pandeyji seeti bajaaye", Dabangg 2); Farah Khan ("Fevicol", Dabangg 2)	Nominated
Colors Screen Awards	19 January 2013	Best Action	A Arasukumar (Dabangg 2)	Nominated
Colors Screen Awards	19 January 2013	Best Actor (Popular Choice)	Salman Khan	Won
Mirchi Music Awards	3 March 2013	Song of The Year	"Dagabaaz Re"	Nominated
Mirchi Music Awards	3 March 2013	Lyricist of The Year	Sameer Anjaan ("Dagabaaz Re")	Nominated
Mirchi Music Awards	3 March 2013	Raag-Inspired Song of the Year	"Dagabaaz Re"	Nominated
Filmfare Awards	20 January 2013	Best Actor	Salman Khan	Nominated
Nickelodeon Kids' Choice Awards, India	2013	Best Actor	Salman Khan	Nominated
Nickelodeon Kids' Choice Awards, India	2013	Best Actress	Sonakshi Sinha	Nominated
Nickelodeon Kids' Choice Awards, India	2013	Best Film	Dabangg 2	Nominated
Screen Awards	2013	Best Actor – Popular Choice	Salman Khan for Dabangg 2 and Ek Tha Tiger	Won
Screen Awards	2013	Best Actor	Salman Khan	Nominated
Screen Awards	2013	Best Music Director	Sajid–Wajid	Nominated
Screen Awards	2013	Best Female Playback Singer	Mamta Sharma for Fevicol Se	Nominated
Screen Awards	2013	Most Promising Debut Director	Arbaaz Khan	Nominated
Screen Awards	2013	Best Villain	Deepak Dobriyal	Nominated
Screen Awards	2013	Best Choreography	Chinni Prakash for PandeyJee Seeti	Nominated
Screen Awards	2013	Best Choreography	Farah Khan for Fevicol Se	Nominated
Screen Awards	2013	Best Dialogue	Dilip Shukla	Nominated
Screen Awards	2013	Best Action	Anl Arasu for Dabangg 2 and Rowdy Rathore	Nominated

== Box office ==
=== India ===
Dabangg 2 was the second-highest grosser of the year behind Ek Tha Tiger. It netted ₹211 million (US$2.2 million) on its opening day, the biggest non-holiday opener beating the previous record held by Rowdy Rathore. On its second day however, the film witnessed a drop due to "excessive screenings and cold weather" but still collected around ₹215 million (US$2.2 million). The film's business grew on Sunday and it collected ₹224 million (US$2.3 million), taking the first weekend total to ₹650 million (US$6.7 million), beating the previous three-day record set by Khiladi 786. After a successful weekend, the film had a strong Monday where it made ₹100 million (US$1.0 million), beating the previous record held by Dabangg. Dabangg 2 collected around ₹157.8 million (US$1.6 million) on Tuesday (Christmas day). Dabangg 2 netted around ₹77.5 million (US$800,000) on Wednesday. The film collected ₹60 million (US$620,000) on Thursday, bringing the first week total to ₹990 million (US$10 million). The film collected ₹200 million (US$2.1 million) in its second weekend taking the film's collections to ₹1.19 billion (US$12 million). The film was declared a blockbuster by Box Office India after its first week. Dabangg 2 has collected around ₹320 million (US$3.3 million) nett in five days of its second week as it grossed a huge ₹80 million (US$830,000) crore plus on Tuesday as it was New Years Day, taking its total to ₹1.42 billion (US$15 million). According to Box Office India, the film became the second highest-grossing film of 2012 in 13 days, adding ₹ 30 million nett on that day. Dabangg 2 collected solid figures of ₹464 million (US$4.8 million) nett in its second week. After successful two weeks, the film further netted ₹75.0 million (US$780,000) in third weekend to make a total of around ₹1,465 million (US$15 million) nett. Dabangg 2 collected a good figure of ₹287 million (US$3.0 million) in its third week. It netted around ₹1.78 billion (US$18 million) nett after the completion of its theatrical run. The final distributor share of the film in India was ₹940 million (US$9.8 million).

=== Overseas ===
Dabangg 2 collected close to US$8.5 million overseas in its opening weekend. The film reached $8 million overseas in 10 days and was declared a 'super-hit' by Box Office India. Dabangg 2 has taken its overseas total to around $10.25 million in 17 days and has become the third biggest overseas hit of 2012 behind Jab Tak Hai Jaan and Ek Tha Tiger, both of which earned the 'blockbuster' status overseas. Dabangg 2 grossed around $11.75 million in its total lifetime.

== Circumquel ==
Dabangg 3, a circumquel and the third installment in the Dabangg (film series) starring Salman Khan and Sudeep was released on 20 December 2019.
