= Arbaaz Khan =

Indian actor and film producer (born 1967)

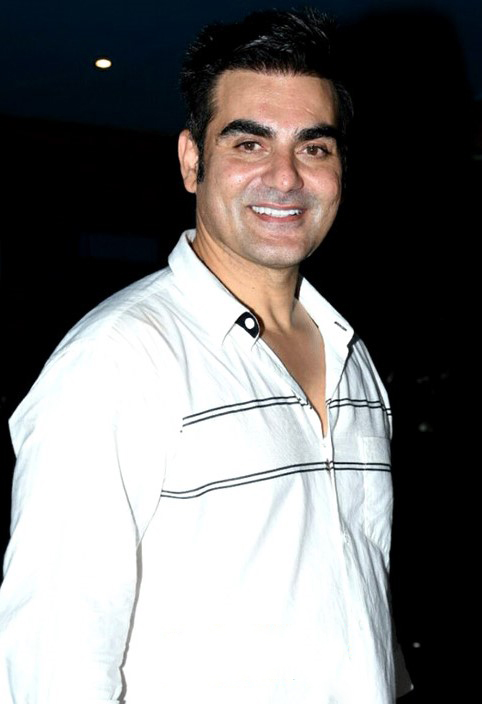
- Khan in 2017
- Born: Arbaaz Salim Khan; 4 August 1967 (age 59); Pune, Maharashtra, India
- Occupations: Actor; film producer
- Years active: 1996–present
- Works: Full list
- Spouses: Malaika Arora (m. 1998; div. 2017) Shura Khan (m. 2023)
- Children: 2
- Parent(s): Salim Khan (father); Helen (step-mother)
- Relatives: Salman Khan (brother); Sohail Khan (brother); Alvira Khan Agnihotri (sister)
- Family: Salim Khan family

Arbaaz Salim Khan (born 4 August 1967) is an Indian actor and film producer who primarily works in Hindi cinema, in addition to Telugu, Urdu and Malayalam cinema.

Since his debut in 1996, he has acted in many leading and supporting roles. He ventured into film production in the Bollywood film industry with Arbaaz Khan Productions, launching Dabangg in 2010, in which he starred as the younger brother of his real-life brother Salman Khan. The film went on to become one of the highest-grossing Bollywood films of all time. He won the National Film Award for Best Popular Film Providing Wholesome Entertainment for the film. He also hosted the reality show Power Couple, which aired on Sony TV. In 2019, Khan made his digital debut with the crime-thriller web series Poison.

== Early life and family ==
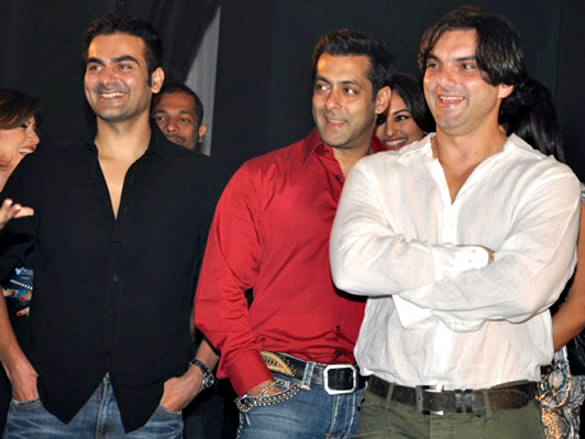
Khan with his brothers Salman Khan and Sohail Khan at an event in 2010

Khan was born as the second son into a family with strong ties to the Bollywood film industry; his father is Salim Khan, a successful screenwriter, and his mother is Sushila Charak (now known as Salma Khan), while his stepmother is dancer and Bollywood actress Helen Khan. He is the brother of Bollywood actor Salman Khan—with whom he attended the Scindia School, Gwalior—and actor-producer Sohail Khan. He has one sister, Alvira Khan (now known as Alvira Khan Agnihotri), and an adopted sister, Arpita Khan. His brother-in-laws are actors Atul Agnihotri and Aayush Sharma.

== Career ==
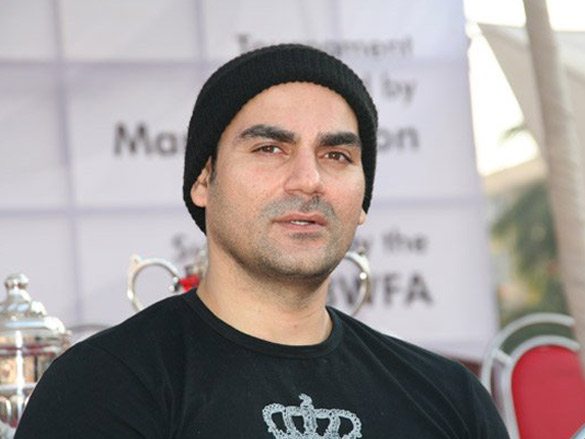
Khan at K. Raheja's Universal Cop Football Match Trophy

Khan made his debut in the 1996 film Daraar in a villainous role as a psychotic wife-beater. He received the Filmfare Award for Best Performance in a Negative Role for his performance. He has starred in many multi-starrer hit films such as Pyaar Kiya To Darna Kya (1998), for which he received a Filmfare Award for Best Supporting Actor nomination, and Garv: Pride and Honour (2004), where he acted opposite his brother Salman.

He played a villainous role in the 2003 film Qayamat: City Under Threat, which was successful at the box office. He also played supporting roles in director Priyadarshan's comedy films Hulchul (2004), Malamaal Weekly (2006) and Bhagam Bhag (2006). He played supporting roles as a police officer (Constable Javed Shaikh) and a mobster (Moscow Chikna) in the 2007 multi-starrers Shootout at Lokhandwala and Fool and Final respectively. He also made a cameo, alongside his brother Sohail Khan, in the blockbuster Jaane Tu... Ya Jaane Na, starring Imran Khan and Genelia D'Souza. In 2009, he starred alongside Sohail in Kisaan and played a villain in Jai Veeru. Khan also appeared in the television serial Karishma - The Miracles of Destiny in 2003, and has appeared in many TV programs from time to time.

He played the main villain in the Telugu film Jai Chiranjeeva starring Chiranjeevi. The movie was extensively shot in Los Angeles, California and Las Vegas, Nevada.

In 2010, Khan ventured into film production with Arbaaz Khan Productions. His first film as a producer was Dabangg, which was released in September 2010. The film starred his brother Salman in the leading role as the anti-hero Chulbul Pandey, alongside Arbaaz as his younger brother Makhi. His former wife Malaika Arora Khan was featured in the popular item number "Munni Badnaam". The film became a blockbuster within the first week of its release and broke several box office records, becoming the second highest grossing Bollywood film of all time at the time of its release. On 12 March 2011, while Khan was a special guest of Australia's Indian film festival, Bollywood & Beyond, he helped his former wife Malaika Arora lead a successful world record attempt in Melbourne. 1235 participants successfully performed a choreographed dance to "Munni Badnaam" from the Dabangg soundtrack.

Khan made his directorial debut with the 2012 released sequel Dabangg 2.

Khan made his Malayalam debut in Big Brother starring Mohanlal.

== Personal life ==
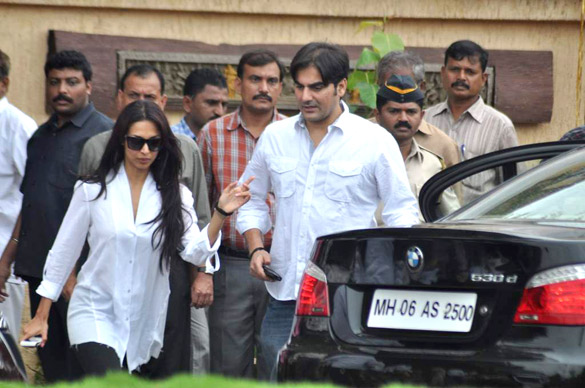
Khan with his then-wife Malaika Arora at Rajesh Khanna's residence Aashirwad in 2012

Khan married model and actress Malaika Arora in 1998. They have a son, Arhaan Khan, born in 2002. The couple announced their separation on 28 March 2016 and officially divorced on 11 May 2017.

Khan married make-up artist Shura Khan on 24 December 2023. Their first child, a girl, was born on 5 October 2025.

== Controversies ==
=== Accident ===
On 1 July 2012, a 70-year-old woman was killed by a Land Cruiser owned by Khan, and the woman's family demanded compensation from the actor. However, the Khan family refused to pay compensation to the family, as the old woman had been disowned by her family.

=== Betting ===
In 2018, Arbaaz Khan confessed to having placed bets on Indian Premier League matches (IPL) in the previous five years. According to a police official, the Bollywood actor admitted that he had been betting on cricket matches for the past five to six years. Thane Police sources also informed that Arbaaz and the accused bookie—Sonu Jalan, a.k.a. Sonu Malad—were brought face-to-face during the interrogation. It was then that Arbaaz confessed about his betting involvement.

=== Sabotaging ===
Arbaaz Khan, his father Salim Khan, and his brothers Sohail and Salman have been accused by director Abhinav Kashyap of sabotaging his film Besharam and his career. Abhinav directed the Khans' blockbuster film Dabangg.

== Awards and nominations ==
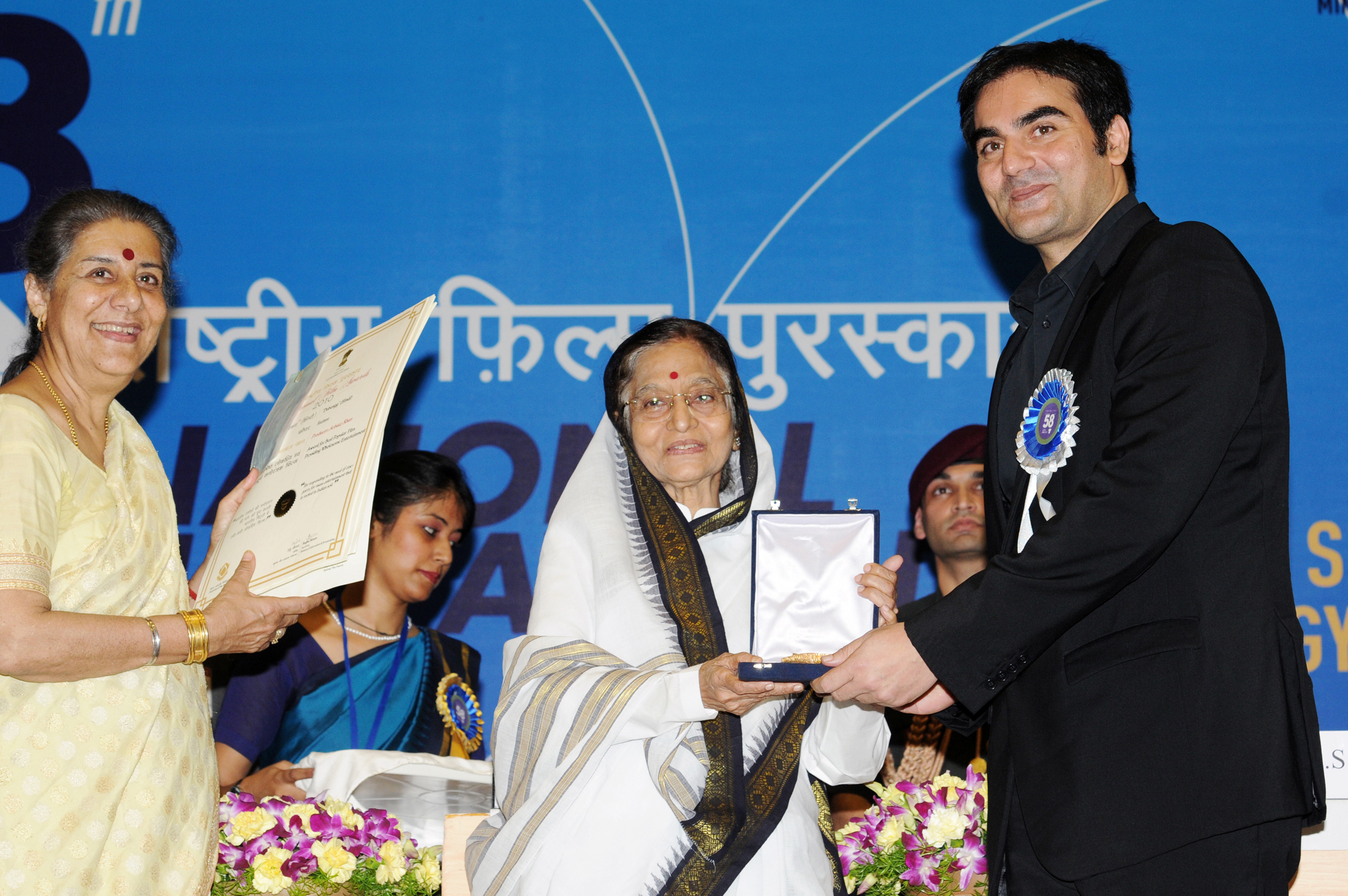
Khan receiving an award from the then, President Pratibha Patil at the 58th National Film Awards in 2011.

Year	Award	Category	Film	Result
1997	Filmfare Awards	Best Villain	Daraar	Won
1999	Filmfare Awards	Best Supporting Actor	Pyaar Kiya To Darna Kya	Nominated
2006	Filmfare Awards South	Best Villain – Telugu	Jai Chiranjeeva	Nominated
2011	National Film Awards	Best Popular Film Providing Wholesome Entertainment	Dabangg	Won
2011	Filmfare Awards	Best Film	Dabangg	Won
2011	IIFA Awards	Best Film	Dabangg	Won
2011	Zee Cine Awards	Best Film	Dabangg	Won
2011	Stardust Awards	Hottest New Film	Dabangg	Won
2011	Stardust Awards	Best Film of The Year	Dabangg	Won
2011	Apsara Film & Television Producers Guild Awards	Best Film	Dabangg	Won
2013	Zee Cine Awards 2013	Power Fun Club Rs. 1 billion	Dabangg 2	Won
2013	Apsara Awards	Most Popular Film Song ("Fevicol Se")	Dabangg 2	Won
2021	South Indian International Movie Awards	Best Actor in a Negative Role	Big Brother	Nominated
