= Dabangg =

2010 Indian film by Abhinav Kashyap

- Theatrical release poster
- Directed by: Abhinav Kashyap
- Written by: Dilip Shukla; Abhinav Kashyap; Sonu Sood
- Produced by: Arbaaz Khan; Malaika Arora; Dhilin Mehta
- Starring: Salman Khan; Sonakshi Sinha; Arbaaz Khan; Sonu Sood; Vinod Khanna; Dimple Kapadia; Mahie Gill; Anupam Kher
- Cinematography: Mahesh Limaye
- Edited by: Pranav V. Dhiwar
- Music by: Songs: Sajid–Wajid; Lalit Pandit; Score: Sandeep Shirodkar
- Production companies: Shree Ashtavinayak Cine Vision; Arbaaz Khan Productions
- Distributed by: Shree Ashtavinayak Cine Vision
- Release date: 10 September 2010
- Running time: 126 minutes
- Country: India
- Language: Hindi
- Budget: ₹41 crore
- Box office: est. ₹221.14 crore

Dabangg (transl. Fearless) is a 2010 Indian Hindi-language action comedy film directed by Abhinav Singh Kashyap (in his directorial debut) and produced by Malaika Arora and Arbaaz Khan under Arbaaz Khan Productions with Dhilin Mehta under Shree Ashtavinayak Cine Vision. The film stars Salman Khan, Sonakshi Sinha, Arbaaz Khan and Sonu Sood in the lead roles, while Om Puri, Dimple Kapadia, Vinod Khanna, Anupam Kher, Mahesh Manjrekar and Mahie Gill feature in supporting roles. The film marks the debut of Sinha as an actress, Arbaaz Khan as a producer and Kashyap as a director. Arora makes a special appearance in the song "Munni Badnaam Hui".

Dabangg is set in the Indian state of Uttar Pradesh. The film was shot primarily in the town of Wai in Maharashtra, while other major scenes were shot in the United Arab Emirates.

Dabangg was released during Eid on 10 September 2010 in nearly 2,100 cinemas worldwide, where it received positive reviews from critics, with praise for the performances of the cast (especially Khan and Sood), the action sequences, soundtrack and humour. It went on to gross ₹219 crore ($47 million) worldwide and became the highest-grossing Hindi film of 2010.

Dabangg has won several awards—the National Film Award for Best Popular Film Providing Wholesome Entertainment and six Filmfare Awards, including Best Film and Best Female Debut (Sinha). The film was remade in Tamil as Osthe, with Sood reprising his role, and in Telugu as Gabbar Singh. It was followed by two sequels: Dabangg 2 (2012) and Dabangg 3 (2019). The latter serves as a partial prequel, describing a flashback which formed the events of Dabangg.

== Plot ==
Chulbul Pandey is a young boy who lives with his younger half-brother Makkhanchand "Makkhi" Pandey, stepfather Prajapati Pandey and mother Naini Devi in Lalganj, Uttar Pradesh. Chulbul has a troubled relationship with Prajapati and Makkhi. After 21 years, Chulbul becomes a cop and calls himself as Robin Hood Pandey, where he still lives with his family. Makkhi is in love with Nirmala, whose father Masterji opposes their relationship. Chulbul falls in love with a girl named Rajjo, whom he meets during a police chase culminating in an encounter.

A corrupt political leader named Chedi Singh meets Chulbul and both quickly become enemies. Makkhi asks Prajapati to arrange his marriage with Nirmala, but Prajapati refuses because he needs money to repay the loans he took to make his factory and believes that he can acquire money through his son marrying a rich girl. In desperate need of money, Makkhi steals some cash from Chulbul's cupboard and gives the stolen cash to Masterji, hoping that he will permit Makkhi to marry Nirmala.

Meanwhile, Chulbul proposes marriage to Rajjo, who rejects as she has to take care of her drunkard father Hariya. Chulbul arrives home to find his mother Naini Devi dead, where he goes to Prajapati to make peace as he is the only family left. However, Prajapati rejects and despises him as an outcast. Makkhi invites Chulbul to his wedding with Nirmala, where Chulbul convinces Hariya to allow him to marry Rajjo. Hariya commits suicide as he knows that his daughter will not marry anyone while he is alive. Chulbul takes Rajjo to Makkhi's exuberant wedding. Realising that Makkhi has stolen his money to finance the ceremony, Chulbul marries Rajjo in an impromptu ceremony. Masterji feels disgraced and cancels his son's wedding with Nirmala.

Still upset that Chulbul jeopardised his wedding, Makkhi beats up one of the workers in his factory due to a small mishap. The worker goes to the police station with his mother to file a complaint. Rather than simply ask Makkhi to apologise to the worker, Chulbul brutally beats up Makkhi in public to disgrace him. Chedi takes advantage of the situation and takes Makkhi along with Prajapati to the police station. Not wishing to aggravate the matter any further, Prajapati resolves the situation by accepting an apology from Chulbul.

Chulbul meets a political leader named Dayal Sahu aka Dayal Babu, who also dislikes Chedi. With his help, Chulbul adulterates Chedi's breweries and wrongly frames him for it attacks. Enraged, Chedi burns Makkhi's factory where Prajapati suffers from a heart attack and is hospitalised. Makkhi goes to Chedi for help, where Chedi agrees to finance Prajapati's treatment if Makkhi delivers a crate of mangoes to Dayal Babu's house.

Unbeknownst to Makkhi, Chedi has placed a bomb inside the crate, which explodes after he leaves, killing Dayal Babu. Chedi gives Makkhi a task to kill Chulbul. Makkhi accepts, but ends up confessing to Chulbul that Chedi made him plant the bomb unknowingly. Chulbul forgives him and reconciles with Prajapati. Chedi also reveals that he killed Naini to retrieve his money back from Chulbul. During a final confrontation between Chulbul and Chedi, Makkhi reveals to Chulbul that it was Chedi, who killed Naini. Chulbul finally kills Chedi by suffocating him with the exhaust pipe of a tractor and arranges Makkhi's marriage with Nirmala.

== Cast ==
- Salman Khan as Chulbul Pandey, Police Inspector aka Robinhood Pandey
- Sonakshi Sinha as Rajjo Shreshawat
- Arbaaz Khan as Makkhanchand "Makkhi" Pandey
- Vinod Khanna as Prajapati Pandey
- Dimple Kapadia as Naini Devi
- Sonu Sood as Chhedi Singh
- Mahesh Manjrekar as Hariya Shreshawat
- Om Puri as Kasturilal Vishkarma
- Anupam Kher as Dayal Babu
- Mahie Gill as Nirmala
- Tinu Anand as Masterji, Nirmala's father
- Murli Sharma as ACP Malik
- Ram Sujan Singh as Chaubeji
- Rajeev Sharma as Toluram Rastogi
- Amitosh Nagpal as Sumant Kumar Shreshawat
- Malaika Arora as Munni in the item number "Munni Badnaam Hui"

== Production ==
=== Casting ===
Salman Khan grew a moustache after consulting with his brother and prepared his hair to suit his role. For the former, he had to try out nearly fifty styles in a span of four months before commencement of the filming. Photo-shoots were held to finalise his look. Abhinav Kashyap, in an interview with Bollywood Hungama, revealed that initially he had considered a few others for the role of Chulbul Pandey, but eventually changed his mind and approached Salman. Kashyap had seen Arbaaz in Jaane Tu Ya Jaane Na, doing a cameo and approached him to be a part of the project. After reading it, he had instantly accepted to produce and star in it. Sonu Sood was selected for playing the lead antagonist. He revealed that his character was that of a "youth leader with grey shades." Mahesh Manjrekar was later approached to play the father of Sinha's character, although he had plans to quit acting.

In April 2009, Sonakshi Sinha signed for her debut role. Salman had seen her at a function engaging in dancing and offered her the role. Speaking about it, she said that she had lost a weight of 30 kg over two years to prepare for her character of a village girl by "a combination of proper diet and vigorous exercise". She added that she had been "observing people and trying to pick up nuances" as a step of further preparation. Malaika Arora, who had performed a few item numbers in her career, most notably in Dil Se.., was confirmed to do the same in the film. This was the first of its kind in her home production.

=== Filming ===
Dabangg's shooting took place primarily in Wai, Maharashtra and the United Arab Emirates. The shooting commenced in September 2009. Production designer Wasiq Khan drew over 100 sketches detailing out every set in the film. The cinematography was performed by Mahesh Limaye. The first schedule began in the town of Wai and continued for 45 days, during which Sonu Sood, the main antagonist fractured his nose. A schedule, primarily involving a song shoot, was captured in the Khalid Bin Al Waheed station in Dubai, making Dabangg the first film to be shot there. Some scenes were also filmed at the Emirates Palace hotel in Abu Dhabi.

The film, involving around five action sequences, was choreographed by S. Vijayan, who previously served as the stunt director of Wanted, and shot over 60 days. Later, special effects were incorporated into those scenes. The songs were choreographed by Raju Khan and Shabina Khan, while Farah Khan choreographed the item number, "Munni Badnaam Hui". The shooting was completed in early June 2010, and the film went into post-production. A party was held to commemorate the completion of the shooting and the success of the theatrical promo. It was attended by the main cast and crew.

== Music ==
The 10-song soundtrack album consisted of five original songs, four remixes and one theme song. Lalit Pandit wrote and composed the item number "Munni Badnaam Hui" while the music director duo Sajid–Wajid composed the remainder of it. Faaiz Anwar and Jalees Sherwani wrote the lyrics for those tracks. The audio rights of Dabangg were sold for about ₹90 million (US$960,000) to T-Series, and the album was launched on 6 August 2010 in Delhi. It received positive response and the album performed well on the charts after its release. The tracks "Tere Mast Mast Do Nain" and "Munni Badnaam Hui" were successful upon release and topped the music, radio and streaming charts.

== Marketing and release ==
Dabangg was described as one of the most anticipated films of the year by The Indian Express. The film's theatrical trailer, running for about two and a half minutes, was released on 23 July 2010, alongside Priyadarshan's Khatta Meetha. Khan promoted the film on the reality show Entertainment Ke Liye Kuch Bhi Karega, India's Got Talent and Sa Re Ga Ma Pa Singing Superstar. An event for the film was held at DLF Promenade in Vasant Kunj, New Delhi with the main cast in attendance, an exclusive merchandise for the film was launched. Another set of promotions was held at Nagpur and Hyderabad. It was reported to have broken pre-release records for hype by Cinematix, a filming awareness product originated by Ormax Media.

Dabangg released worldwide on 10 September 2010. Before the film's theatrical release, a special screening of the film took place at Film City on 6 September 2010. The premiere of Dabangg was held in Mumbai on 9 September 2010. It opened up across 1,800 screens in India and around 300 screens overseas. The film was released in 2300 theatres worldwide. It was also screened in Norway at an international film festival. The film's DVDs and VCDs were launched by the Reliance Big Home Video on 12 October 2010. It was released on YouTube on 28 January 2011 for free viewing to audiences in India. The satellite rights were pre-sold for ₹100 million (US$1.1 million) to Colors.

== Reception ==
=== Critical response ===
"For anybody who wants to know what is the on-screen definition of Bollywood, Dabangg is truly text book fare. It's loud, crazy, zany, exaggerated, larger-than-life, almost nonsensical, totally make-believe, comic book like, complete kitsch, generously peppered with the mandatory desi tadka (garnishing) of songs and dances that keep popping out of nowhere and is literally oozing with star charisma."

— Nikhat Kazmi, while reviewing the film.

The film generally received positive reviews from critics, most of whom praised the performances of Salman Khan and Sonu Sood, music, humour and action sequences. On the review aggregator website Rotten Tomatoes, 60% of 5 critics' reviews are positive, with an average rating of 6/10.

In a 4-star review for Koimoi, Komal Nahta ensured that the film would be a commercial success and said "Dabangg may be a routine subject but its other plus points will ensure that it proves a runaway hit". Kaveree Bamzai of India Today gave the film four stars while labelling it as "one Zandu Balm of a movie." Film critic Aniruddha Guha of Daily News and Analysis called the film "slightly mad, and terribly entertaining."

Mathures Paul of The Statesman gave the film 3.5 stars and commented, "Dabangg aligns itself with viewers frustrated by the nonexistence of uncomplicated heroism on screen." In a 3-star review for Rediff.com, Abhishek Mande stated "Dabangg is not a movie for non-Salman fans. But for those who worship him it's a film you simply cannot afford to miss." Anupama Chopra of NDTV gave 3 stars and stated that the film is watchable for the "sheer pleasure of watching Salman Khan in top form". Sukanya Venkataraghavan of Filmfare also rated 3-stars, and praised Khan's performance.

Gaurav Malani of Indiatimes was critical towards the film's story, remarking "the film doesn't care a damn for coming up with any innovative storyline." Rajeev Masand of CNN-IBN panned the film's screenplay, but praised Khan's performance. Shobhaa De of the Bangalore Times was critical, concluding "Let's hand it to Salman who has pulled off the stunts and pelvic thrusts. Nothing new there. But it is the naughty self-parodying, which is so camp, so out there, which delivers the biggest punch. What's left for this guy now – all he needs is a cape. And he can call himself Superman."

=== Box office ===
==== Domestic ====
Dabangg opened to ₹145 million (US$1.5 million) nett collections in its first day, and became the highest opener of all time across India. On the second day, it netted ₹165 million (US$1.8 million). At the end of its weekend, the film collected the total of ₹495 million (US$5.3 million). The film netted ₹106 million (US$1.1 million) on Monday, ₹86 million (US$920,000) on Tuesday, ₹70 million (US$750,000) on Wednesday, and ₹60 million (US$640,000) on Thursday taking the total nett collections to around ₹815 million (US$8.7 million) in its first week of release. It subsequently became the highest opening week nett grosser.

Dabangg netted ₹62 million (US$660,000) on the second Friday, ₹75 million (US$800,000) on Saturday and ₹105 million (US$1.1 million) on Sunday, for a ₹238 million (US$2.5 million) second weekend, a drop of around 50% from the opening weekend. In its second week, the film earned ₹360 million (US$3.8 million), taking the total nett collections to ₹1.16 billion (US$12 million) in two weeks, thus becoming the second highest-grossing film of all time in two weeks. The distributor share of Dabangg was declared to be ₹770 million (US$8.2 million)—the second highest in Bollywood. Dabangg collected ₹160 million (US$1.7 million) during the third week and ₹60 million (US$640,000) in its fourth week, taking the domestic nett collections to ₹1.4 billion (US$15 million). The domestic nett collections in eleven weeks was ₹1.4 billion (US$15 million). It eventually progressed to ₹1.41 billion (US$15 million).

==== Overseas ====
Dabangg opened to a positive response in the overseas markets as well. The film's final overseas collections were US$6.10 million. It grossed a total of US$4.20 million in the international markets at the end of its second weekend.

In the United States, Dabangg collected $628,137 from 62 screens in its opening weekend and $1,068,589 at the end of its second weekend. In the United Arab Emirates, it collected 3.2 million Dirhams in the opening weekend, and $1,550,000 at the end of the second weekend. Dabangg collected a total of $5.50 million, making it the fifth highest-grossing in United Arab Emirates with a $2 million gross. In the United Kingdom, it collected £332,673 from 41 screens in its opening weekend and £570,566 by the end of its second weekend. In Australia, the film collected $126,000 from 14 screens in the opening weekend, and A$272,909 at the end of its second weekend. In Mauritius and South Africa, it collected US$25,000 each in its opening weekend. In Fiji, the film collected US$20,000 the opening weekend. In other territories of Europe and Africa, the film collected $100,000 in its opening weekend.

== Controversies ==
"Munni Badnaam Hui" included a brand name 'Zandu Balm' in its lyrics, much to the displeasure of Emami—the makers of the brand. A trademark case was settled by the producers and Emami out of court, and Malaika Arora was later chosen to an official advertising campaign promoting Zandu Balm. Activist Rajkumar Tak filed a case in the Bombay High Court, demanding that the deletion of the word "Hindustan" from the song, claiming that the censor board had not responded to his queries in regard to the "defaming" lyrics. He found them "highly objectionable" and "unpardonable" and labelled the song a "mockery" for the country, as a girl was "indecently" dancing in the presence of corrupted officers, which, according to him, threw bad light on the nation and "hurt the patriotic sentiments of every Indian".

Before release, critic and writer Shobhaa De called for a boycott of Dabangg, due to Salman's comments on the 2008 Mumbai attacks. She criticised it as "arrogance, ignorance and plain stupidity." This sparked off a fight with the producers via Twitter, and continued after her negative review of the film. Anurag Kashyap, brother of Abhinav Kashyap, tweeted "Salman khan thinks he made my brother's life.. Hope he can do the same for his brother Arbaaz with Dabangg 2." This was taken as "slamming" Salman and resulted in Arbaaz retorting back by referring to the comment as "attitude" instead of "gratitude". However, Anurag later apologised for his remarks, which Arbaaz accepted.

== Awards and nominations ==
Dabangg received accolades in major film award functions in India. Among them, it won the National Film Award for Best Popular Film Providing Wholesome Entertainment. It was given six awards at the 56th Filmfare Awards, including one for Best Film, seven Screen Awards, nine Zee Cine Awards, and ten IIFA Awards.

== Legacy ==
Dabangg's success attributed to the extensive promotional campaigns and the commercial factors present in the film. The stock prices of the film's co-producers Shree Ashtavinayak Cine Vision at Bombay Stock Exchange saw an increase with the company gaining about 40% of its prices from 1 September 2010. About the promotional tactics of the film, Dhilin Mehta said that "We promoted the character Chulbul Pandey instead of brand Salman Khan. Today, the character has become a national rave in the league of Gabbar Singh from Sholay (1975) and Mogambo from Mr. India (1987)".

Film critic and trade analyst Komal Nahta also compared these campaign to the marketing gimmicks used by Rajkumar Hirani in Munna Bhai M.B.B.S. (2003), Lage Raho Munna Bhai (2006) and 3 Idiots (2009), where the characters Munna Bhai and Ranchoddas Chanchad are promoted to pull crowd till a time they become an established brand. He added "All the stars and producers have realized the value of marketing and promotion [...] In fact theses gimmicks have become as important as, say, making a good film."

10 years after the film's release, Arbaaz Khan had stated in an interview that the film's budget was hiked from ₹30 crore (equivalent to ₹73 crore or US$7.8 million in 2026) to ₹49 crore (equivalent to ₹120 crore or US$13 million in 2026), leading to few losses for him, but after the monumental success, he paid the salary for Salman Khan. In January 2022, the official merchandise of the film featuring movie clips, posters, and stills, among other collectables were released through non-fungible tokens (NFT). It was headlined by Salman Khan-backed BollyCoin in collaboration with the technology-backed marketplace creator NFTically. It was featured in Time Out's "100 Best Bollywood Films".

While the film was appreciated for its commercial elements, the flip side, it was criticised for the misogyny, objectification of women and the blatant sexism of the character Chulbul Pandey. In 2021, Mumbai Police shared few dialogues and quotes from the film denouncing misogyny.

== Sequels ==
After the release of Dabangg, Arbaaz Khan announced that he was planning a sequel to it. After the commercial success of the film, Khan reported "Dabangg 2 may take time to hit the floors, but it is definitely on the cards." He also announced that the main leads, Salman Khan and Sonakshi Sinha were already cast to reprise their parts in the sequel. Among the new cast members are Prakash Raj, who plays the main antagonist, while Kareena Kapoor performs an item number in the film. Director Abhinav Kashyap opted out of directing the sequel, and therefore Arbaaz took over as the film's director. Dabangg 2 which released in December 2012, became one of the highest-grossing Bollywood film of all time in India. Another sequel, Dabangg 3, was released in December 2019. It serves both as a prequel to Dabangg and a sequel to Dabangg 2, taking the story back and forth.

The Chulbul Pandey you will see in Dabangg 4 soon will be very different from the one you saw in the first outing. His character, like all the other characters, has evolved with time and will continue to do so.

— Salman Khan, on the fourth instalment of Dabangg

In November 2021, director Rohit Shetty had planned for a potential inclusion of Chulbul Pandey, Khan's character in his Cop Universe franchise, and work on the film might commence only after completing Ranveer Singh's Cirkus. Later, that month, a fourth instalment of the franchise titled Dabangg 4 was announced with Khan deciding to make few changes on the script and the character, in order to be raw and realistic, which followed after the critical response of his role in Antim: The Final Truth (2021). Later, impressed by the narration of the script, Tigmanshu Dhulia was roped in to direct the film in late-December.

== Remakes ==
Dabangg was remade in Tamil as Osthe (2011) by Dharani with Silambarasan playing the lead role, and Sonu Sood reprising his original role. It was also remade in Telugu as Gabbar Singh (2012), starring Pawan Kalyan and was directed by Harish Shankar.

== Animated series ==
An animated series based on the film titled Dabangg – The Animated Series is produced by Salman Khan Films, Arbaaz Khan Productions and Cosmos Maya. Conceptualised in late-2020, the series featured an animated version of the character Chulbul Pandey. It premiered through Cartoon Network on 31 May 2021 and also through the Disney+ Hotstar streaming service.
