= Goliyon Ki Raasleela Ram-Leela (soundtrack) =

Soundtrack album by Sanjay Leela Bhansali
- Released: 4 October 2013
- Recorded: 2012–2013
- Studios: AVA Studios, Mumbai
- Genre: Feature film soundtrack
- Length: 47:02
- Label: Eros Music
- Producer: Sanjay Leela Bhansali

Sanjay Leela Bhansali chronology
Guzaarish (2010)	Goliyon Ki Raasleela Ram-Leela (2013)	Bajirao Mastani (2015)

Goliyon Ki Raasleela Ram-Leela is the soundtrack to the 2013 romantic tragedy film of the same name, directed and co-produced by Sanjay Leela Bhansali, and starring Ranveer Singh and Deepika Padukone. Bhansali also composed the film's soundtrack, which consists of 11 songs and were written by Siddharth–Garima. The music was influenced by traditional folk music originated from Gujarat and were composed before the film's production. The album was released on 4 October 2013 through the Eros Music label on digital platforms.

== Plot ==
Goliyon Ki Raasleela Ram-Leela is Bhansali's second stint as a composer after Guzaarish (2010). He composed 10 tracks, with only seven were featured in the film. Each track has a certain visual in Bhansali's mind and had ensured that the songs live up to the visuals, that spent him nearly two years to develop the sound he intended. Most of the music had been composed and produced before shooting the film, where he could hum the songs after he got the idea for the film and compose it prior to the filming. His influences of the film's music were mostly derived from the Gujarati folk music he listened in his childhood with his family members; he travelled to the interiors of Gujarat to get the authentic folk sounds. He was further influenced by the Hindustani classical and Marathi folk music, as well as the music from the vintage Hindi cinema.

Siddharth–Garima was introduced to Bhansali by the Bhansali Productions' CEO, Sandeep Singh, who approved his involvement after Bhansali listened to the lyrics and started working on the songs. Aditya Narayan, who assisted Bhansali, had performed two songs after the latter was impressed by his work. The other songs were performed by Shreya Ghoshal, Arijit Singh, Aditi Paul, Shail Hada, Shadaab Faridi, Altamash Faridi, Osman Mir, Bhoomi Trivedi, Arvind Vegda amongst several others. Bhansali described the compositions as challenging as he relentlessly worked on curating the film's music and the team had to retrieve the master audio tapes to be sent to the production. He applauded Singh and Padukone for their efforts they gave for the film's music.

Bhansali adapted and arranged the Gujarati folk song "Mor Bani Thanghat Kare" for the film; however, he credited the song to lyricist and translator Jhaverchand Meghani and composer Hemu Gadhavi.

== Release ==
On 23 September 2013, prior to the album's release, the makers released the music video for the first song "Tattad Tattad", an introductory number for Singh. The video for the second song "Nagada Sang Dhol", described as the garba number, featuring Padukone was released on 1 October 2013. The film's music launch was initially scheduled to be held on 29 September 2013 but was delayed due to Singh's health issues and eventually cancelled. The album was released on digital platforms on 4 October.

== Reception ==
=== Critical reception ===
In his review for Rediff.com, Joginder Tuteja assigned three-and-a-half out of five, summarizing "With a perfect mix of folk and fusion songs, Ram-Leela's music stands out from the rest and is a sure shot winner". Dhiren Trivedi of Bollywood Life rated four out of five, stating "although Ram-Leela seems to be set in a very situational mould, Sanjay Leela Bhansali manages to deliver the goods [...] SLB's soulful music in varied genres and styles dares to be creatively different and succeeds with panache. Undoubtedly, Ram-Leela will have big takers and is likely to grow manifold in popularity in the days to come." Calling it as a "feast for music lovers", Yashika Mathur of Indo-Asian News Service summarized that "[Bhansali] adds grandeur to the album with his compositions but at the same time gives enough space to his singers to shine. Barring a few, all the songs are worth listening to."

Vipin Nair of Music Aloud assigned 7.5 (out of 10) and wrote "A soundtrack that is quite comparable to Sanjay Leela Bhansali’s last, Guzaarish, in its mix. This hangover factor is concerning though." Sankhayan Ghosh of The Indian Express assigned three-and-a-half out of five and wrote "Sanjay Leela Bhansali continues to embrace the traditional Hindi film music." All the songs may not be instant chartbusting material or GenY party fodder, but there is solid substance here—and style. The lack of recall value in a couple of tracks—even if they all sound lovely when we are listening to them—prevents a higher rating." Karthik Srinivasan of Milliblog wrote "From Saawariya and Guzaarish, this is some, limited progress for Sanjay as a composer." Anand Holla of Bangalore Mirror wrote "Bhansali spans across hues and moods to give Ram-Leela his all and some more."

=== Accolades ===
Accolades for Goliyon Ki Raasleela Ram-Leela
Award	Category	Recipient(s) and nominee(s)	Result	Ref.
Apsara Film & Television Producers Guild Awards	Best Music Director	Sanjay Leela Bhansali	Nominated	
Apsara Film & Television Producers Guild Awards	Best Male Playback Singer	Aditya Narayan – (Tattad Tattad" and "Ishqyaun Dhishqyuan")	Nominated	
Apsara Film & Television Producers Guild Awards	Best Female Playback Singer	Aditi Paul – ("Ang Laga De" and "Mor Bani Thanghat Kare")	Nominated	
Apsara Film & Television Producers Guild Awards	Best Female Playback Singer	Bhoomi Trivedi – ("Ram Chahe Leela")	Won	
Bollywood Hungama Surfers Choice Music Awards	Best Soundtrack	—	Nominated	
Bollywood Hungama Surfers Choice Music Awards	Best Song	"Nagada Sang Dhol"	Nominated	
Bollywood Hungama Surfers Choice Music Awards	Best Song	"Ram Chahe Leela"	Nominated	
Bollywood Hungama Surfers Choice Music Awards	Best Lyricist	Siddharth–Garima – ("Lahu Munh Lag Gaya")	Nominated	
Bollywood Hungama Surfers Choice Music Awards	Best Playback Singer – Female	Shreya Ghoshal – ("Nagada Sang Dhol")	Nominated	
Bollywood Hungama Surfers Choice Music Awards	Best Playback Singer – Female	Bhoomi Trivedi – ("Ram Chahe Leela")	Nominated	
BIG Star Entertainment Awards	Most Entertaining Music	Sanjay Leela Bhansali	Won	
BIG Star Entertainment Awards	Most Entertaining Singer – Male	Aditya Narayan – (Tattad Tattad")	Nominated	
BIG Star Entertainment Awards	Most Entertaining Singer – Female	Bhoomi Trivedi – ("Ram Chahe Leela")	Won	
BIG Star Entertainment Awards	Most Entertaining Singer – Female	Shreya Ghoshal – ("Nagada Sang Dhol")	Nominated	
Filmfare Awards	Best Music Director	Sanjay Leela Bhansali	Nominated	
Filmfare Awards	Best Female Playback Singer	Shreya Ghoshal – ("Nagada Sang Dhol")	Nominated	
Global Indian Music Academy Awards	Best Film Album	—	Nominated	
Global Indian Music Academy Awards	Best Music Director	Sanjay Leela Bhansali	Nominated	
Global Indian Music Academy Awards	Best Background Score	Monty Sharma	Nominated	
Global Indian Music Academy Awards	Best Male Playback Singer	Arijit Singh – ("Laal Ishq")	Nominated	
Global Indian Music Academy Awards	Best Female Playback Singer	Bhoomi Trivedi – ("Ram Chahe Leela")	Nominated	
Global Indian Music Academy Awards	Best Music Debut	Osman Mir – ("Mor Bani Thanghat Kare")	Nominated	
Global Indian Music Academy Awards	Best Engineer – Film Album	Tanay Gajjar	Nominated	
Global Indian Music Academy Awards	Best Music Arranger and Programmer	Shail Hada – ("Ram Chahe Leela")	Nominated	
International Indian Film Academy Awards	Best Female Playback Singer	Bhoomi Trivedi – ("Ram Chahe Leela")	Nominated	
Mirchi Music Awards	Album of the Year	—	Nominated	
Mirchi Music Awards	Upcoming Lyricist of The Year	Siddharth–Garima – ("Laal Ishq")	Won	
Mirchi Music Awards	Upcoming Lyricist of The Year	Siddharth–Garima – ("Ang Laga De")	Nominated	
Mirchi Music Awards	Upcoming Lyricist of The Year	Siddharth–Garima – ("Lahu Munh Lag Gaya")	Nominated	
Mirchi Music Awards	Upcoming Female Vocalist of the Year	Bhoomi Trivedi – ("Ram Chahe Leela")	Won	
Mirchi Music Awards	Song Recording and Engineering of the Year	Tanay Gajjar – ("Ram Chahe Leela")	Nominated	
Zee Cine Awards	Best Background Score	Monty Sharma	Nominated	
Zee Cine Awards	Best Playback Singer – Female	Bhoomi Trivedi – ("Ram Chahe Leela")	Nominated	

== Track listing ==
Goliyon Ki Raasleela Ram-Leela track listing
No.	Title	Lyrics	Music	Singer(s)	Length
1.	"Ang Laga De"	Siddharth–Garima	Sanjay Leela Bhansali	Aditi Paul, Shail Hada	5:27
2.	"Dhoop"	Siddharth–Garima	Sanjay Leela Bhansali	Shreya Ghoshal	3:36
3.	"Ishqyaun Dhishqyaun"	Siddharth–Garima	Sanjay Leela Bhansali	Aditya Narayan	4:51
4.	"Laal Ishq"	Siddharth–Garima	Sanjay Leela Bhansali	Arijit Singh, Osman Mir, Altamash Faridi	6:27
5.	"Lahu Munh Lag Gaya"	Siddharth–Garima	Sanjay Leela Bhansali	Shail Hada, Osman Mir, Shadab Faridi, Altamash Faridi	5:00
6.	"Mor Bani Thanghat Kare"	Jhaverchand Meghani	Hemu Gadhavi	Osman Mir, Aditi Paul	3:58
7.	"Nagada Sang Dhol"	Siddharth–Garima	Sanjay Leela Bhansali	Shreya Ghoshal, Osman Mir	4:33
8.	"Poore Chand"	Siddharth–Garima	Sanjay Leela Bhansali	Shail Hada	4:08
9.	"Ram Chahe Leela"	Siddharth–Garima	Sanjay Leela Bhansali	Bhoomi Trivedi	4:04
10.	"Tattad Tattad"	Siddharth–Garima	Sanjay Leela Bhansali	Aditya Narayan, Shadab Faridi, Altamash Faridi	4:58
11.	"Bhala Mori Rama"	Siddharth–Garima	Sanjay Leela Bhansali	Arvind Vegda	1:07
Total length:					47:02
