= Ragini MMS 2 (soundtrack) =

2014 soundtrack album

Soundtrack album by Meet Bros Anjjan, Yo Yo Honey Singh, Chirrantan Bhatt and Pranay Rijia
- Released: 7 March 2014
- Recorded: 2013–2014
- Genre: Film soundtrack
- Length: 25:45
- Language: Hindi
- Label: T-Series
External audio
- Audio Jukebox on YouTube

Meet Bros Anjjan chronology
| Boss (2013) | Ragini MMS 2 (2014) | Bhoothnath Returns (2014) |

Yo Yo Honey Singh chronology
| Yaariyan (2014) | Ragini MMS 2 (2014) | Bhoothnath Returns (2014) |

Chirrantan Bhatt chronology
| Boss (2013) | Ragini MMS 2 (2014) | Gabbar Is Back (2015) |

Pranay Rijia chronology
| Blood Money (2012) | Ragini MMS 2 (2014) | 3 A.M. (2014) |

Ragini MMS 2 is the soundtrack album to the 2014 film of the same name directed by Bhushan Patel and produced by Balaji Motion Pictures and ALT Entertainment. The album featured six songs composed by Meet Bros Anjjan, Yo Yo Honey Singh, Chirrantan Bhatt and Pranay Rijia, with lyrics written by Kumaar, Manoj Yadav and Singh. It was released under the T-Series label on 7 March 2014. The songs "Baby Doll" and "Chaar Bottle Vodka" became chartbusters, and Kanika Kapoor, who performed vocals for "Baby Doll" won the Filmfare Award for Best Female Playback Singer amongst other accolades.

== Background and release ==
The soundtrack of Ragini MMS 2 featured four original songs: Meet Bros Anjjan, Yo Yo Honey Singh, Chirrantan Bhatt and Pranay Rijia, composed each song. The album also accompanied a reprised version of "Maine Khud Ko" and a remix of "Baby Doll", combining six tracks into the album.

The first song "Baby Doll" was teased with a music video on 12 February, and was released as a single on 14 February. Upon its release, it received great response on YouTube and went on to be a chartbuster. The song's video is heavily inspired by the track "Dance Again" by Jennifer Lopez from the album Dance Again... The Hits. The second song "Chaar Botal Vodka" featuring Sunny Leone along with Honey Singh was also a great success receiving more than 5 million views in 5 days.

The soundtrack was released through T-Series on 7 March 2014.

== Critical reception ==
Joginder Tuteja of Rediff.com found the album as a "pleasant surprise" because of its inclusion of hardcore dance numbers, along with a haunting number and romantic melody, which was mandatory for a horror film; he added "as a collective effort, the music should ensure that Sunny Leone's film gets a good head-start on its release in theatres." Bryan Durham of The Times of India rated three-and-a-half out of five, saying "The Ragini MMS 2 works on many levels, with only a few minor kinks." Karthik Srinivasan of Milliblog wrote "The second Ragini's MMS belongs to Honey Singh".

Suanshu Khurana of The Indian Express stated "the attempt to bring in a host of composers gives us a broth with various fun flavours. But then it only has four songs, two of them with an extra version and one with not much value." Writing for the same website, Priya Adivarekar summarized "the Ragini MMS 2 album is below average, with songs that have very little repeat value." Rajiv Vijayakar of Bollywood Hungama wrote "This is a score that will work for a while. The rating is for the score's commercial prospects. Let's not expect anything lasting or substantial here."

== Commercial reception ==
The success of the film was highly attributed to the music, particularly that of "Baby Doll" and "Chaar Botal Vodka". Priya Gupta of The Times of India listed the album as the fourth-best in the top five listings, and "Baby Doll" topped the year-ender lists, doing the same for the bi-annual and quarterly reports. Kanika Kapoor was described as the "impressive talent".

A list of ten popular songs listed by "Hungama.com Chart-toppers 2014" included "Baby Doll"; the song topped the "Top 10 songs of 2014" by The Indian Express, and also listed it in the year-ender best songs by India Today.

== Track listing ==
| No. | Title | Lyrics | Music | Singer(s) | Length |
|---|---|---|---|---|---|
| 1. | "Baby Doll" | Kumaar | Meet Bros Anjjan | Kanika Kapoor, Meet Bros Anjjan, Kunal Avanti | 3:33 |
| 2. | "Chaar Botal Vodka" | Yo Yo Honey Singh | Yo Yo Honey Singh | Yo Yo Honey Singh | 3:45 |
| 3. | "Maine Khud Ko" | Kumaar | Pranay Rijia | Mustafa Zahid | 5:29 |
| 4. | "Lori of Death" | Manoj Yadav | Chirantan Bhatt | Arpita Chakraborty | 3:15 |
| 5. | "Maine Khud Ko" (Reprise) | Kumaar | Pranay Rijia | Kshitij Tarey | 5:30 |
| 6. | "Baby Doll" (Remix) | Kumaar | DJ Shilpi, Meet Bros Anjjan | Kanika Kapoor, Meet Bros Anjjan | 4:09 |
| Total length: | | | | | 25:45 |

== Accolades ==
| Award | Date of ceremony (Note: Date is linked to the article about the awards held that year, wherever possible.) | Category | Recipients | Result | Ref. |
|---|---|---|---|---|---|
| BIG Star Entertainment Awards | 18 December 2014 | Most Entertaining Song | "Baby Doll" | Won | |
| BIG Star Entertainment Awards | 18 December 2014 | Most Entertaining Singer (Female) | Kanika Kapoor – "Baby Doll" | Won | |
| Filmfare Awards | 31 January 2015 | Best Female Playback Singer | Kanika Kapoor – "Baby Doll" | Won | |
| Global Indian Music Academy Awards | 24 February 2015 | Best Female Playback Singer | Kanika Kapoor – "Baby Doll" | Won | |
| Global Indian Music Academy Awards | 24 February 2015 | Best Music Debut | Kanika Kapoor – "Baby Doll" | Nominated | |
| Global Indian Music Academy Awards | 24 February 2015 | Best Music Arranger and Programmer | Bharat Goel – "Baby Doll" | Nominated | |
| Global Indian Music Academy Awards | 24 February 2015 | Best Film Song | "Baby Doll" | Nominated | |
| International Indian Film Academy Awards | 5–7 June 2015 | Best Female Playback Singer | Kanika Kapoor – "Baby Doll" | Won | |
| Mirchi Music Awards | 27 February 2015 | Female Vocalist of The Year | Kanika Kapoor – "Baby Doll" | Nominated | |
| Mirchi Music Awards | 27 February 2015 | Upcoming Female Vocalist of The Year | Kanika Kapoor – "Baby Doll" | Nominated | |
| Mirchi Music Awards | 27 February 2015 | Best Song Producer (Programming & Arranging) | Bharat Goel and Meet Bros Anjjan – "Baby Doll" | Won | |
| Mirchi Music Awards | 27 February 2015 | Best Song Engineer (Recording & Mixing) | Gautam Chakraborty, Uddipan Sharma and Eric Pillai – "Baby Doll" | Nominated | |
| Star Guild Awards (Note: Also known as Apsara Film & Television Producers Guild Awards.) | 12 January 2015 | Best Music Director | Meet Bros Anjjan – "Baby Doll" | Nominated | |
| Star Guild Awards | 12 January 2015 | Best Female Playback Singer | Kanika Kapoor – "Baby Doll" | Won | |
| Stardust Awards | 15 December 2014 | Best Female Playback Singer | Kanika Kapoor – "Baby Doll" | Won | |
