= Dum Laga Ke Haisha (soundtrack) =

Soundtrack album by Anu Malik
- Released: 6 February 2015
- Recorded: 2014–2015
- Genre: Feature film soundtrack
- Length: 29:10
- Language: Hindi
- Label: YRF Music

Anu Malik chronology
Shootout at Wadala (2013)	Dum Laga Ke Haisha (2015)	Welcome Back (2015)

Dum Laga Ke Haisha is the soundtrack album to the 2015 film of the same name, written and directed by Sharat Katariya and produced by Maneesh Sharma under Yash Raj Films, with Aditya Chopra serving as presenter. The film stars Ayushmann Khurrana and Bhumi Pednekar. The album consists of seven songs composed by Anu Malik, with lyrics by Varun Grover, and was released under the YRF Music label on 6 February 2015.

The soundtrack received positive reviews from critics and won two National Film Awards: Best Female Playback Singer for Monali Thakur and Best Lyrics for Grover, both for the song "Moh Moh Ke Dhaage".

== Background ==
"There was no reason for him [Chopra] to call me. We had never interacted socially. I asked Anju, 'Aditya Chopra has called me to Yash Raj, shall I go?' She looked at me with an incredulous expression and asked me to drop everything and rush to the meeting [...] He told me that my job was to convince Sharat and producer Maneesh Sharma, who were 'hard to please'. I concentrated on giving my best and won the assignment."

— Anu Malik, on receiving the offer to compose for Dum Laga Ke Haisha

Anu Malik composed the seven-song soundtrack for Dum Laga Ke Haisha. It marked his first solo composition project in the 2010s, as he had mostly contributed to multi-composer soundtracks during that decade due to a lack of major assignments, with only a handful of small budget films in the early part of the decade. Malik received a text message from Yash Raj Films chairman Aditya Chopra, with whom he had not previously collaborated, and met him at the YRF office in November 2013. Chopra informed Malik that he had approached several composers but was not satisfied with their work, and added that Malik would also have to convince writer-director Sharat Katariya and producer Maneesh Sharma.

Malik presented tunes with an old-school flavour, in contrast to contemporary film music trends. Both Katariya and Sharma were impressed with his compositions, which led to his selection as the film's music director. Against the norm, lead actor Ayushmann Khurrana did not contribute his vocals to the soundtrack, making Dum Laga Ke Haisha his first film to not feature him as a singer.

== Development ==
"The film has a great story and there is a song for every season of the human heart — from falling in love for the first time, of laughter, of rain and of heartbreak."

— Anu Malik on the music of Dum Laga Ke Haisha

The soundtrack album featured compositions reminiscent of 1990s Hindi film music. Malik stated that his inspiration came from a six-decade-long melodic tradition emphasised by his father, Sardar Malik, as well as the styles of composers such as Shankar–Jaikishan, Naushad, O. P. Nayyar, C. Ramchandra, R. D. Burman and Laxmikant–Pyarelal, whose work he grew up listening to. All the songs were written by lyricist Varun Grover.

Speaking about the song "Moh Moh Ke Dhaage", Malik explained that "the words speak of a coming together of two different people. It is a situational song and conveys how we unwittingly fall in love. Varun wrote the mukhda and it made a place in my heart. I came up with the tune two days later." Papon rendered the male version of the track, which Malik described as having a "Hemant Kumar kind of texture, which I admire". Monali Thakur recorded the female version, after Malik, impressed by her voice during her participation in Indian Idol 2 (where he was a judge), invited her to sing the track. Thakur later stated that she felt emotional after recording the song and watching the visuals, adding that "Anu ji was like, only you can sing this song and no one else [...] Beneath all that madness, he is a real genius and a most sincere person."

Kumar Sanu performed two songs on the album, including the duet "Dard Karaara" with Sadhana Sargam, which marked her comeback. Malik noted that Sanu recorded the song in a single take. The album also featured collaborations with newer artists such as Rahul Ram and the Nooran Sisters. On working with them, Malik remarked, "When you work for so many years in the industry, you form your cliques. But I quickly realised that I have to be open to work with new talent." Several tracks incorporated contemporary elements, reflecting Malik's adaptation to new musical trends.

== Reception ==
Joginder Tuteja of Rediff.com described the soundtrack as "the surprise of the season" and wrote that the music "makes one nostalgic for a bygone era". Devesh Sharma of Filmfare stated, "Anu Malik is back from hibernation with this one. And instead of going for obtuse forays into disco and techno, he has stuck to using melody as his gauntlet and has indeed issued a challenge to the young Turks out there."

Karthik Srinivasan of Milliblog called the album "a minor comeback of sorts by veteran Anu Malik". Suanshu Khurana of The Indian Express noted, "We wish Malik had returned to his classic sound with an emphasis on grand melodies. For now, the album sees sporadic goodness."

Rajiv Vijayakar of Bollywood Hungama wrote, "Celebrate, for a genius, a legendary composer is back to show how far he is above the rookies who have made it big at a game in which he is a past master. All our living legends need to return to rescue music from the morass it has fallen into, but everyone does not get an Aditya Chopra to back him. In that sense, both Anu and the music lover within us are extremely lucky."

== Track listing ==
All lyrics are written by Varun Grover; all music is composed by Anu Malik.

No.	Title	Singer(s)	Length
1.	"Moh Moh Ke Dhaage" (Male)	Papon	5:22
2.	"Dum Laga Ke Haisha"	Kailash Kher, Nooran Sisters	3:34
3.	"Tuu Meri Sare Inteha"	Kumar Sanu	2:45
4.	"Moh Moh Ke Dhaage" (Female)	Monali Thakur	5:22
5.	"Dard Karaara"	Kumar Sanu, Sadhana Sargam	4:15
6.	"Sunder Susheel"	Malini Awasthi, Rahul Ram	4:47
7.	"Prem's Theme"	Papon, Bishal Phukan	3:05
Total length:			29:10

== Awards and nominations ==
Award	Category	Recipient(s)	Result	Ref.
63rd National Film Awards	Best Female Playback Singer	Monali Thakur (for the song "Moh Moh Ke Dhaage")	Won	
63rd National Film Awards	Best Lyrics	Varun Grover (for the song "Moh Moh Ke Dhaage")	Won	
11th Star Guild Awards	Best Music Director	Anu Malik	Nominated	
11th Star Guild Awards	Best Lyricist	Varun Grover (for the song "Moh Moh Ke Dhaage")	Won	
11th Star Guild Awards	Best Playback Singer – Female	Monali Thakur (for the song "Moh Moh Ke Dhaage")	Won	
61st Filmfare Awards	Best Lyricist	Varun Grover (for the song "Moh Moh Ke Dhaage")	Nominated	
61st Filmfare Awards	Best Male Playback Singer	Papon (for the song "Moh Moh Ke Dhaage")	Nominated	
61st Filmfare Awards	Best Female Playback Singer	Monali Thakur (for the song "Moh Moh Ke Dhaage")	Nominated	
22nd Screen Awards	Best Male Playback	Papon (for the song "Moh Moh Ke Dhaage")	Won	
22nd Screen Awards	Best Female Playback	Monali Thakur (for the song "Moh Moh Ke Dhaage")	Won	
2016 Zee Cine Awards	Best Lyricist	Varun Grover (for the song "Moh Moh Ke Dhaage")	Won	
2016 Zee Cine Awards	Best Music Director	Anu Malik	Won	
2016 Zee Cine Awards	Best Playback Singer – Male	Papon (for the song "Moh Moh Ke Dhaage")	Nominated	
2016 Zee Cine Awards	Best Playback Singer – Female	Monali Thakur (for the song "Moh Moh Ke Dhaage")	Nominated	
17th IIFA Awards	Best Lyricist	Varun Grover (for the song "Moh Moh Ke Dhaage")	Won	
17th IIFA Awards	Best Female Playback Singer	Monali Thakur (for the song "Moh Moh Ke Dhaage")	Won	
17th IIFA Awards	Best Male Playback Singer	Papon (for the song "Moh Moh Ke Dhaage")	Won	
6th GiMA Awards	Best Male Playback Singer	Papon (for the song "Moh Moh Ke Dhaage")	Won	
6th GiMA Awards	Best Lyricist	Varun Grover (for the song "Moh Moh Ke Dhaage")	Won	
6th GiMA Awards	Best Female Playback Singer	Monali Thakur (for the song "Moh Moh Ke Dhaage")	Nominated	
6th GiMA Awards	Best Film Song	"Moh Moh Ke Dhaage"	Nominated	
8th Mirchi Music Awards	Best Lyrics	Varun Grover (for the song "Moh Moh Ke Dhaage")	Won	
8th Mirchi Music Awards	Best Playback Singer – Female	Monali Thakur (for the song "Moh Moh Ke Dhaage")	Nominated	
8th Mirchi Music Awards	Best Playback Singer – Male	Papon (for the song "Moh Moh Ke Dhaage")	Won	
