= Bhoomi Trivedi =

Indian singer (born 1988)

- Born: Vadodara, Gujarat, India
- Genre: Filmi
- Occupation: Singer
- Instrument: Vocals
- Years active: 2012–present

Bhoomi Trivedi is an Indian singer, known for her Hindi songs "Ram Chahe Leela" from Goliyon Ki Raasleela: Ram-Leela (2013), and Husn Parcham from Zero (2018), which resulted in her getting several awards and nominations for.

== Life and career ==
Trivedi hails from a musical family in Vadodara of Gujarat. She started to learn music while she was in 8th grade. Her father is a Railways employee who is fond of singing and her mother is a folk singer who has her own music group. Her elder sister is an engineer and a trained Bharata Natyam dancer.

In 2007, Trivedi got selected from audition to perform in Indian Idol 3, however quit the show as she was suffering from jaundice. The following year she was again auditioned to perform in Indian Idol 4, but again had to quit the show since her aunt died because of breast cancer. She returned to the Indian Idol 5 where she ends up the competition as the Runner-up.

Trivedi, began her Bollywood career with 2012 film Prem Mayee with the song "Bahne Dey". However, she rose to fame with her rendition in Sanjay Leela Bhansali's 2013 released film Goliyon Ki Raasleela: Ram-Leela, where she lent her voice for the song Ram Chahe Leela which was picturized on Priyanka Chopra. She was initially approached to pen Gujarati lyrics and sing that bit for a song arranged by Shail Hada when she was told that Bhansali was looking for a different voice to sing a song for his next film. The song was well received by the audience and critics, while reviewers praised Trivedi's rendition in the song. Other than Bollywood songs, she also had recorded for several Gujarati films including the song 'Vaagyo Re Dhol' from the national award-winning film Hellaro.

== Bollywood discography ==
Denotes films that have not yet been released

Year	Film	Song	Co-singer(s)	Composer(s)	Writer(s)	Ref.
2012	Prem Mayee	"Bahne Dey"	Solo	Abhishek Ray		
2013	Goliyon Ki Raasleela: Ram-Leela	"Ram Chahe Leela"	Solo	Siddharth-Garima	Sanjay Leela Bhansali	
2015	Hero	"Dance Ke Legend"	Meet Bros	Meet Bros Anjjan	Kumaar	
2016	Janaan	"Shor Sharaba"	Shadab Faridi	Ahmed Ali	Fatima Najeeb	
2017	Raees	"Udi Udi Jaye"	Sukhwinder Singh, Karsan Sagathia	Ram Sampath	Javed Akhtar	
2018	Hope Aur Hum	"Hope Aur Hum"	Suraj Jagan	Rupert Fernandez	Sourabh Dikshit	
2018	Zero	"Husn Parcham"	Raja Kumari	Ajay–Atul	Irshad Kamil	
2018	When Obama Loved Osama	"Muft Ki Mila Bas"	Divya Kumar	Kashi Richard	Shweta Raj	
2019	Cabaret	"Aakhri Shaam"	Solo	Kaustav Narayan Niyogi		
TBA	Hotel Beautifool	"Mann Samunder"	Solo			
2020	Sab Kushal Mangal	"Na Duniya Mangi Hai"	Harshit Saxena	Harshit Saxena	Sameer Anjaan	
2020	Sab Kushal Mangal	"Naya Naya Love"	Harshit Saxena	Harshit Saxena	Sameer Anjaan	
2020	Sab Kushal Mangal	"Ishq Ne Mara Re"	Hatshit Saxena, Swaroop Khan	Harshit Saxena	Sameer Anjaan	
2022	Regina	"Toot Toot"				
2022	Regina	"Apna Peeche"				
2023	I Love You	"Salamat Rahe"	Solo	Clinton Cerejo, Bianca Gomes	Hussain Haidry	
2023	Rocky Aur Rani Kii Prem Kahaani	"Dhindhora Baje Re"	Darshan Raval	Pritam	Amitabh Bhattacharya	
2025	Mere Husband Ki Biwi	"Channa Tu Bemisal"	Jubin Nautiyal	Tanishk Bagchi	Mudassar Aziz	

== Marathi discography ==
Denotes films that have not yet been released

Year	Film	Song	Co-singer(s)	Composer(s)	Writer(s)	Ref.
2015	Carry On Maratha	"Carry On Maratha – Title Track"	Aditya Narayan	Shail Hada-Pritesh Mehta	Mangesh Kangane	

== Bengali discography ==
Denotes films that have not yet been released

Year	Film/Album	Song	Co-singer(s)	Composer(s)	Writer(s)	Ref.
2019	Oriplast Originals	"Nodi Bhora Dheu (নদী ভরা ঢেউ)"	Lakshman Das (Baul)	Kinjal-SamB	Bhoba Pagla (Nodi Bhora Dheu), SamB (extended lyrics)	

== Gujarati discography ==
Denotes films that have not yet been released

Year	Film/Album	Song	Co-singer(s)	Composer(s)	Writer(s)	Ref
2016	Mad For Each Other	Madi No Garbo	Sahil Shivram	Navin Shivram	Ashok Bhujak	
2017	Armaan: Story of a Storyteller	Aa Duniya Ma		Samir-Mana	D-Kay	
2018	Satti Par Saato	Bol Bilaadi Bol	Raja Hasan	Ambika-Prateek	Dilip Rawal	
2018	Satti Par Saato	Laado Chor		Ambika-Prateek	Dilip Rawal	
2018	Chhutti Jashe Chhakka	Color Color Which Color	Divya Kumar, Bhargav Purohit	Kedar-Bhargav	Bhargav Purohit	
2019	Chaal Jeevi Laiye!	"Ghanu Jeevo"	Keerthi Sagathia, Various Artists	Sachin–Jigar	Niren Bhatt	
2019	Chaal Jeevi Laiye!	"Ghanu Jeevo Reprise"	Keerthi Sagathia, Various Artists	Sachin–Jigar	Niren Bhatt	
2019	47 Dhansukh Bhawan	"Shu Thai Che?"	Solo	Shuchita Vyas	Jay Bhatt	
2019	Hellaro	"Vagyo Re Dhol"	Solo	Mehul Surti	Saumya Joshi	
2022	Kehvatlal Parivar	"Holi Aavi Aavi"	Divya Kumar, Madhubanti Bagchi, Tanishka Sanghvi, Hariom Gadhvi	Sachin–Jigar	Bhargav Purohit	
2022	Jaysuk Zdpayo	"Naughty Naughty"	Solo	Kashyap Sompura	Medha Antani	
2022	Hoon Tari Heer	"Saathi Male Na Male"	Sairam Dave	Rahul Munjariya	Nandan Purohit	
2022	Aum Mangalam Singlem	"Latko"	Solo	Sachin–Jigar	Niren Bhatt	
2023	Kutch Express (film)	"Ude Re Gulal"	Keerthi Sagathia	Sachin–Jigar	Sneha Desai	
2023	Hello	"Chahera Pacchal Chahero"	solo	Birju Kantharia	Vinni Patel	

== Awards ==
Year	Category	Nominated Song	Film	Result	Ref
International Indian Film Academy Awards
2023	"Most favourite Independent Song	"Pritam Pardesi""			
2022	"Most For best Singer"	saathi Male" from the film 'Hoon Tari Heer""			
2014	Best Female Playback Singer	"Ram Chahe Leela"	Goliyon Ki Raasleela Ram-Leela	Nominated	
Zee Cine Awards
2014	Best Female Playback Singer	"Ram Chahe Leela"	Goliyon Ki Raasleela Ram-Leela	Nominated	
Star Guild Awards
2014	Best Female Playback Singer	"Ram Chahe Leela"	Goliyon Ki Raasleela Ram-Leela	Won	
BIG Star Entertainment Awards
2013	Most Entertaining Female Singer	"Ram Chahe Leela"	Goliyon Ki Raasleela Ram-Leela	Won	
Mirchi Music Awards
2013	Upcoming Female Vocalist of the Year	"Ram Chahe Leela"	Goliyon Ki Raasleela Ram-Leela	Won	
Global Indian Music Academy Awards (GiMA Awards)
2014	Best Playback Singer − Female	"Ram Chahe Leela"	Goliyon Ki Raasleela Ram-Leela	Nominated	
