= Laal Ishq (song) =

2013 Hindi song

Song by Arijit Singh

from the album Goliyon Ki Raasleela: Ram-Leela
- Language: Hindi
- Released: 1 October 2013
- Recorded: AVA Studios, Mumbai
- Genre: Filmi; classical
- Length: 6:27
- Label: Sony Music India
- Composer: Sanjay Leela Bhansali
- Lyricist: Siddharth-Garima
- Producer: Shail Hada

Goliyon Ki Raasleela: Ram-Leela track listing
- 1. "Ang Laga De"; 2. "Dhoop"; 3. "Ishqyaun Dhishqyaun"; 4. "Laal Ishq"; 5. "Lahu Munh Lag Gaya"; 6. "Mor Bani Thanghat Kare"; 7. "Nagada Sang Dhol"; 8. "Poore Chand"; 9. "Ram Chahe Leela"; 10. "Tattad Tattad"

Music video
- "Laal Ishq" on YouTube

Laal Ishq (transl. Red love) is a Hindi song from the 2013 Hindi film, Goliyon Ki Raasleela: Ram-Leela. Composed by Sanjay Leela Bhansali, the song is sung by Arijit Singh with lyrics by Siddharth–Garima. The track is produced and arranged by Shail Hada. The music video of the track features actors Deepika Padukone and Ranveer Singh.

== Background ==
The song is composed by Sanjay Leela Bhansali and rendered by Arijit Singh, marking their first collaboration. Bhansali first heard Singh in the reality show Fame Gurukul. In an interview with Bollywood Hungama, Bhansali said; "Singh is a very special singer. It's a different musical sound today. But I enjoyed interacting with the younger lot for my music". The song opens with the sound of temple bells and is accompanied with different instruments like Shehnai, Sitar and Guitar. The music of the song is arranged and produced by Shail Hada.

The song is picturised on Deepika Padukone and Ranveer Singh. In the music video, Padukone is presented lying across her bed with splayed hair and a bleeding finger. Singh is then shown waving his bleeding finger on the glass door and peeking through the door.

== Release and response ==
The song was released digitally as a part of the soundtrack of film on 1 October 2013. The music video of the song was officially released on 26 November 2013, through the YouTube channel of Eros Now.

Popular ghazal singer Talat Aziz expressed his fondness to the song stating, "I liked "Laal Ishq" by Arijit Singh from Ram-Leela. The song is in Raag Bihag and he has sung it well. He is a promising singer". Indian film actor Amitabh Bachchan watched the film thrice and he tweeted saying, "Signed by Laal Ishq". The song was ranked at position 3 in the list of "Critically appreciated songs" from "Bollywood music report January – December 2013" published by The Times of India.

== Critical reception ==
Bollywood Hungama's Rajiv Vijayakar calling Arijit Singh "a complete and stunning revelation" appraised the "effortless" composition by Sanjay Leela Bhansali and "shade esoteric" lyrics by the duo Siddharth–Garima. Vijayakar further added that the song brings the feel that "we are listening to a semi-classical song at a live concert". NDTV reviewers affirmed that "track will blow you off" and added; "It can strike an instant chord with the emotional audiences. The singer takes the song and the music to another level". Similar sentiments were echoed by Yashika Mathur from Daily News and Analysis who further called the song "spiritual".

Mohar Basu from Koimoi perceived that the song is "sheer beauty" despite its length. Basu, crediting Singh for its soul, explained; "By effortlessly making this slow song into a mesmerizing hear, the track is well grounded in classical music".

Writing from Rediff.com, Joginder Tuteja wrote: "An easy to ears number which has a soothing feel to it, Laal Ishq is for the ones in love". Sankhayan Ghosh of The Indian Express declared the song as the best of the album. He further added that Singh "is making it a habit to get the best tunes". Gosh felt that interlude of the song is "very similar" to "Mashallah" from Saawariya (2007).

Mumbai Mirror writer, Anand Holla calling it "the standout track" eulogise the use of instruments in the song and explained; "Arijit Singh's persuasive voice lights up this slow-paced hymn to love". Bryan Durham of The Times of India saying "Laal Ishq" is one of those tracks that seem situational and moody, mentioned that it has a "for-all-times quality". He further stated that the instruments used in the song is "top-notch".

== Accolades ==
Year	Award	Category	Nominee	Result	Ref
2013	Mirchi Music Awards	Upcoming Lyricist of the year	Siddharth–Garima	Won	
2014	Global Indian Music Academy Awards	Best Male Playback Singer	Arijit Singh	Nominated	
