= Guzaarish (soundtrack) =

Guzaarish (Original Motion Picture Soundtrack)

Soundtrack album by Sanjay Leela Bhansali
- Released: 15 October 2010
- Recorded: 2009–2010
- Genre: Feature film soundtrack
- Length: 40:19
- Language: Hindi
- Label: T-Series
- Producer: Sanjay Leela Bhansali

Sanjay Leela Bhansali chronology
Guzaarish (Original Motion Picture Soundtrack) (2010)	Goliyon Ki Raasleela Ram-Leela (2013)

Guzaarish (Original Motion Picture Soundtrack) is the soundtrack album to the 2010 film of the same name directed and produced by Sanjay Leela Bhansali starring Hrithik Roshan and Aishwarya Rai Bachchan. Bhansali also composed the film's soundtrack in his debut as a music composer. The album consisted of 10 songs with lyrics written by A. M. Turaz, Vibhu Puri and Jagdish Joshi. It was released under the T-Series label on 15 October 2010 to positive reviews from critics.

== Development ==
Guzaarish marked the debut of Bhansali as a music composer, although he composed one song "Thode Badmaash" for Saawariya (2007). Despite his collaborations with Ismail Darbar and Monty Sharma in his previous films, he found it difficult to express his musical ideas. His interest to debut as a musician attributed on listening to Lata Mangeshkar's songs in his formative years, and that helped him to convey human emotions on screen. He also cited R. D. Burman's work in 1942: A Love Story (1994), where Bhansali was a screenwriter and producer, as an inspiration.

While writing the script of Guzaarish, he deciphered the importance of music on how it interpreted the emotions of the characters and treating it as his own entity would help him to establish his ideas musically, which resulted in his composition stint. Speaking to Sankhayan Ghosh of The Hindu, Bhansali added that the idea was initially meant on how he enjoyed while developing and making music, though he found tuning all the songs in Guzaarish was challenging.

Bhansali had tuned eight tracks, where four of them had been composed by May 2009. One of the cast members from Guzaarish, stated that the songs are "fiercely original" that exuded the "old-world charm" and further added that it "redefines contemporary film music". Bhansali took a longer time for curating the compositions, where he would record each song three to four times and take four days to mix them, to achieve the desired results. "At the end of the process, they would say they feel traumatised and want to run away from me", Bhansali said.

== Release ==
The soundtrack to the film released exclusively through the iTunes Store on 8 October 2010. It was then commercially released at an event held in Mumbai on 15 October 2010 with the cast and crew in attendance. The event was hosted by Aditya Roy Kapur, who appeared in a pivotal role and was felicitated by Amitabh Bachchan, Abhishek Bachchan and UTV's chairman Ronnie Screwvala as the chief guests. The songs were performed live by Shankar Mahadevan, Kunal Ganjawala, K.K., Shail Hada, Harshdeep Kaur, Sunidhi Chauhan, Francois Castellino, Rakesh Pandit and Vibhavari Apte Joshi and conducted live by Bhansali himself. Amitabh Bachchan unveiled the music CDs and presented the first to Screwvala, and the event concluded with the final song being performed by the entire cast.

== Reception ==
Sukanya Verma of Rediff.com rated 4 out of 5 and wrote "the Guzaarish OST, despite its rough edges and miscalculations, tells you that this not a pompous filmmaker trying to get ahead of his game but a creative professional exploring his range and possibilities. And for that alone, take a bow, Mr Bhansali." Joginder Tuteja of Bollywood Hungama rated 3.5 out of 5 and summarized that "[Sanjay Leela] Bhansali makes a very good impression as the first-time composer for a complete album." Ruchika Kher of Hindustan Times wrote "as a first time music director, Bhansali has done a commendable job, concentrating more on vocals and quality of compositions than just the beats." A review from The Times of India described the score as "equally noteworthy".

Vipin Nair of Music Aloud rated 7 out of 10, calling it as "a decent debut as composer from Sanjay Leela Bhansali which would have been much better had he cut down on the number of songs, especially the similar-genre ones." Karthik Srinivasan of Milliblog, however, was critical of the soundtrack album, with praise for the title track and "Udi" but found the other songs being "indistinguishably melancholic and predictable". Devesh Sharma of Filmfare rated two out of five and summarized "Bhansali mostly gets it right but you wish he'd used an experienced music director as a sounding board for his ideas rather than composing the songs himself. It would have been a great album then instead of just a pleasant one." Anuj Kumar of The Hindu attributed Bhansali being "swept by the A. R. Rahman wave" in the film's score.

The soundtrack was well received by the audience, with Amitabh Bachchan loved the film's music. Bhansali, on the reception for the film's music, added "I never thought the music would have such a strong appeal for the young. The fact that my songs have connected with the young makes me want to go deeper into music."

== Track listing ==
Guzaarish (Original Motion Picture Soundtrack) track listing
No.	Title	Lyrics	Singer(s)	Length
1.	"Guzaarish"	A. M. Turaz	K.K., Shail Hada	4:19
2.	"Sau Gram Zindagi"	Vibhu Puri	Kunal Ganjawala	4:42
3.	"Tera Zikr"	A. M. Turaz	Rakesh Pandit, Shail Hada	4:59
4.	"Saiba"	Vibhu Puri	Vibhavari Apte Joshi, Shail Hada, Francois Castellino	3:26
5.	"Jaane Kiske Khwaab"	A. M. Turaz	K.K.	2:58
6.	"Udi"	A. M. Turaz	Sunidhi Chauhan, Shail Hada	3:22
7.	"Keh Na Saku"	Jagdish Joshi	Shail Hada	3:47
8.	"Chaand Ki Katori"	Vibhu Puri	Harshdeep Kaur	5:25
9.	"Daayein Baayein"	A. M. Turaz	K.K.	3:28
10.	"Dhundhli Dhundhli"	A. M. Turaz	Shankar Mahadevan	3:53
Total length:				40:19

== Accolades ==
Accolades for Guzaarish (Original Motion Picture Soundtrack)
Award	Category	Nominee	Result
Filmfare Awards	Best Female Playback Singer	Sunidhi Chauhan – ("Udi")	Nominated
Stardust Awards	Best Female Playback Singer	Sunidhi Chauhan – ("Udi")	Nominated
Stardust Awards	Best Breakthrough Performance – Male	Shail Hada – ("Tera Zikr")	Won
Stardust Awards	Best Breakthrough Performance – Female	Vibhavari Apte Joshi – ("Saiba")	Won
Stardust Awards	New Musical Sensation – Female	Harshdeep Kaur – ("Chand Ki Katori")	Nominated
Stardust Awards	Standout Performance by a Music Director	Sanjay Leela Bhansali	Nominated
Zee Cine Awards	Best Female Playback Singer	Sunidhi Chauhan – ("Udi")	Nominated
BIG Star IMA Awards	Best Visualized Song Track (Female)	"Udi"	Won
3rd Mirchi Music Awards	Female Vocalist of The Year	Sunidhi Chauhan – ("Udi")	Nominated
3rd Mirchi Music Awards	Upcoming Female Vocalist of The Year	Vibhavari Apte Joshi – ("Saiba")	Nominated
3rd Mirchi Music Awards	Upcoming Music Composer of The Year	Sanjay Leela Bhansali – ("Udi")	Nominated
3rd Mirchi Music Awards	Upcoming Lyricist of The Year	Jagdish Joshi and Vibhu Puri – ("Keh Na Sakoon")	Nominated
3rd Mirchi Music Awards	Upcoming Lyricist of The Year	Vibhu Puri – ("Sau Gram Zindagi")	Nominated
3rd Mirchi Music Awards	Best Background Score of the Year	Tubby–Parik	Nominated
