= Ram Chahe Leela =

"Ram Chahe Leelaa"

Song by Bhoomi Trivedi

from the album Goliyon Ki Raasleela Ram-Leela
- Language: Hindi
- Released: 23 October 2013
- Genre: Filmi, pop-folk, Hindustani classical music
- Length: 4:04
- Label: Eros; Sony Music India
- Composer: Sanjay Leela Bhansali
- Lyricist: Siddharth-Garima
- Producer: Shail Hada

"Ram Chahe Leela" (transl. Ram Loves Leela) is a 2013 song from the film Goliyon Ki Raasleela Ram-Leela directed and composed by Sanjay Leela Bhansali. The song was sung by Bhoomi Trivedi and was written by Siddharth-Garima and was picturised on Priyanka Chopra.

The song is a love balled with lyrics describing the relationship of the two protagonists. Choreographed by Vishnu Deva, the video features Chopra as a nautch girl who is performing the song for Ram. The dance sequence is a contemporary mujra with mostly complicated dance steps. Chopra's white costume consisting of a choli and lungi was designed by Anju Modi.

The song and the music video both have received critical acclaim, with critics praising the composition and lyrics, Trivedi vocals, Deva's choreography and Chopra's performance. Commercially, the song topped several charts across India and became one of the most popular songs of the year. The song has also received considerable attention for Chopra's styling and costume.

== Production ==
"Ram Chahe Leela" is an introductory song of the two protagonists -Ram and Leela, hinting at the dynamics of their relation in the film. The vocals for the song are given by 'Indian Idol' fame Bhoomi Trivedi, while the lyrics are written by Siddharth-Garima. The song is choreographed by Vishnudeva.

Sanjay Leela Bhansali approached Aishwarya Rai and Priyanka Chopra for an item number in his film at the same time. Media reported that Rai was offered a song named "Thappad Se Dar Nahi Lagta, Pyaar Se Dar Lagtaa Hai", which was meant to be her comeback to films after a long hiatus. However, Rai did not approve the lyrics of the song which were similar to a dialogue of Salman Khan's 2010 film Dabangg. Rai asked Bhansali to change the lyrics. However, Bhansali offered Chopra a song with the changed lyrics, which she accepted. Deccan Chronicle published "Bhansali is known to approach more than one actor for any project. While he discussed the song with Aishwarya, Priyanka was also kept in the loop and was offered a song in the film for the same situation. However, the reasons of Chopra being given a different remained unknown."

The production cost of the song was reported to be Rs 6 crore. The costume was designed by Anju Modi, who also did the costumes for the film. For filming the song over 2,500 candles were lit on the set.

== Reception ==
The song received acclaim from music critics, who praised the song and Trivedi's vocals, describing it as one of the highlights from the album. Rediff.com wrote "The album starts on a smash note with the title song Ram Chahe Leela, which gives the kind of kick-start that a high adrenaline love story that Ram-Leela warranted. A good fusion number that brings on Western elements into Indian folk and classical." Indo-Asian News Service gave a positive response to the song and praised Trivedi's vocals writing "Bhoomi Trivedi's rustic voice definitely suits the genre. It is an unusual item song, but the regional flavour adds to its magic." Koimoi declared it as a "laudable product" noting "It takes a few hears to sync the latent beauty of the composition that uses singer Bhoomi Trivedi’s voice confidently. The hint of rock flavor works well when laid against the background of heavy background arrangement!" Yahoo! India described the song as the highlight dance number, which adds to the narrative. The review also praised its fast-paced beats, musical arrangements ( fusion of Gujarati folk and western) and simple Hindi-English lyrics and wrote that "Tridevi shows her class with an excellent rendition." Mumbai Mirror wrote "Bhoomi Trivedi is terrific in the racy, part-rock partfolk Ram Chaahe Leela. A mean bassline and taut drums are set against synth notes, while the chorus is cleverly styled as a Bhajanlike chant."

The video received more than 18 million views after its release. The song has topped various charts across India. Currently, the full video song has over 126 million views on YouTube.

== Accolades ==
Award	Category	Recipient(s) and nominee(s)	Result	Ref.
Big Star Entertainment Awards	Most Entertaining Female Singer	Bhoomi Trivedi	Won	
Big Star Entertainment Awards	Most Entertaining Dancer	Priyanka Chopra	Nominated	
Global Indian Music Academy Awards	Best Female Playback Singer	Bhoomi Trivedi	Nominated	
Global Indian Music Academy Awards	Best Music Arranger and Programmer	Shail Hada	Nominated	
International Indian Film Academy Awards	Best Female Playback Singer	Bhoomi Trivedi	Nominated	
Mirchi Music Awards	Upcoming Female Vocalist of the Year	Bhoomi Trivedi	Won	
Producers Guild Film Awards	Best Female Playback Singer	Bhoomi Trivedi	Won	
Producers Guild Film Awards	Best Choreography	Vishnu Deva	Nominated	
Zee Cine Awards	Best Playback Singer – Female	Bhoomi Trivedi	Nominated	
