= GiMA Award for Best Music Arranger and Programmer =

The GiMA Best Music Arranger and Programmer is given by Global Indian Music Academy as a part of its annual Global Indian Music Academy Awards to recognise a music arranger who has delivered an outstanding performance in a film song.

== List of winners ==
- 2010 Hitesh Sonik, Clinton Cerejo for "Dhan Te Nan" – Kaminey
- 2011 Sandeep Shirodkar for "Pee Loon" – Once Upon A Time In Mumbaai
  - Abhijit Nalani for "Sheila Ki Jawani" – Tees Maar Khan
  - Salim–Sulaiman for "Ainvayi Ainvayi" – Band Baaja Baaraat
  - Sandeep Shirodkar for "Tere Mast Mast Do Nain" – Dabangg
  - Shankar–Ehsaan–Loy for "Oh Girl You're Mine" – Housefull
- 2012 Shankar–Ehsaan–Loy for "Señorita" – Zindagi Na Milegi Dobara
  - Abhijit Nalani, Abhijit Vaghani for "Criminal" – Ra.One
  - Abhijit Nalani, Giorgio Tuinfort for "Chammak Challo" – Ra.One
  - A.R. Rahman for "Sadda Haq" – Rockstar
  - Hyacinth D'Souza for "Subha Hone Na De" – Desi Boyz
  - Shankar–Ehsaan–Loy for "Zaraa Dil Ko Thaam Lo" – Don 2
- 2013 – (no award given)
- 2014 Hyacinth D’Souza, DJ Phukan, Nikhil Paul George, Sunny M. R. for "Badtameez Dil" – Yeh Jawaani Hai Deewani
  - DJ Phukan for "Sunn Raha Hai" – Aashiqui 2
  - Yo Yo Honey Singh for "Lungi Dance" – Chennai Express
  - Shail Hada for "Ram Chahe Leela" – Goliyon Ki Raasleela Ram-Leela
  - Gopi Sunder for "1234 Get On The Dance Floor" – Chennai Express
- 2015 Amit Trivedi, Sourav Roy for "London Thumakda" – Queen
  - A.R. Rahman for "Maahi Ve" – Highway
  - Abhijit Nalani, Zoheb Khan for "Bang Bang" – Bang Bang!
  - Bharat Goel for "Baby Doll" – Ragini MMS 2
  - DJ Phukan for "Awari" – Ek Villain
  - Shankar–Ehsaan–Loy for "Kill Dil" – Kill Dil
- 2016 Shail-Pritesh for "Deewani Mastani" – Bajirao Mastani
  - Amit Trivedi, Sovon Mukherjee for "Dhadaam Dhadaam" – Bombay Velvet
  - Amit Trivedi, Sourav Roy, Gourab Dutta for "Gulaabo" – Shaandaar
  - Kalyan Pathak, Mike Cichowicz for "Girls Like To Swing" – Dil Dhadakne Do
  - Sachin–Jigar for "Jee Karda" – Badlapur

== See also ==
- Bollywood
- Cinema of India
