= Baby Doll (Kanika Kapoor song) =

2014 song by Kanika Kapoor and Meet Bros from Ragini MMS 2

Song by Kanika Kapoor, Meet Bros Anjjan, Kunal Avanti

from the album Ragini MMS 2
- Language: Punjabi; Hindi
- Released: 14 February 2014
- Genre: Hip hop; Bhangra; Filmi
- Length: 3:33
- Label: T-Series
- Composer: Meet Bros Anjjan
- Lyricist: Kumaar

Music video
- "Baby Doll" on YouTube

“Baby Doll" is a Punjabi song by Kanika Kapoor for the Hindi film Ragini MMS 2. For this song, Kanika Kapoor won the Filmfare Award for Best Female Playback Singer.

== Critical reception ==
The song has received mixed-to-positive reviews. Reviewers from Times of India described the song as "a hook-filled dance number that has definite repeat value", while Joginder Tuteja from Rediff wrote that "the song has chartbuster written all over it".

Suanshu Khurana of Indian Express was more critical as they wrote that the song "may not be perfect in terms of musicality" and "even cheesy", but also praised its "catchy melody, unique voices, and those heady beats". Khurana also noted the orchestration's comtemporary feel, which is almost exclusively created by an Octapad with the only Punjabi folk instrument being the tumbi.

== Release and performance ==
A teaser of the song was released on 6 February 2014. The video song was released on YouTube on 12 February 2014. The audio song was released as a single on 14 February 2014. For most of the year, it was on the top charts on several music channels. "Baby Doll" also became a euphemism for Sunny Leone.

== Awards and nominations ==
Year	Nominee	Award	Category	Result	Ref.
2015	Bharat Goel & Meet Bros Anjjan	Mirchi Music Awards	Best Song Producer (Programming & Arranging)	Won	
2015	Gautam Chakraborty, Uddipan Sharma & Eric Pillai	Mirchi Music Awards	Best Song Engineer (Recording & Mixing)	Nominated	
2015	Kanika Kapoor	Mirchi Music Awards	Female Vocalist of The Year	Nominated	
2015	Kanika Kapoor	Mirchi Music Awards	Upcoming Female Vocalist of The Year	Nominated	
2015	Kanika Kapoor	Filmfare Awards	Best Female Playback Singer	Won	
2015	Kanika Kapoor	GiMA Awards	Best Female Playback Singer	Won	
2015	Kanika Kapoor	Screen Awards	Best Female Playback Singer	Nominated	
2015	Kanika Kapoor	Star Guild Awards	Best Female Playback Singer	Won	
2014	Kanika Kapoor	BIG Star Entertainment Awards	Most Entertaining Singer (Female)	Nominated	
2014	Kanika Kapoor	Stardust Awards	Best Playback Singer – Female	Won	
