= 47 Dhansukh Bhawan =

2019 one shot Gujarati thriller film

- Theatrical release poster
- Directed by: Naiteek Ravval
- Written by: Naiteek Ravval
- Produced by: Naiteek Ravval; Rishi Vyas
- Starring: Gaurav Paswala; Rishi Vyas; Shyam Nair; Hemang Vyas; Jay Bhatt
- Cinematography: Jignesh Pandya
- Edited by: Naiteek Ravval
- Music by: Shuchita Vyas, Saikat Kumar Singha (BGM)
- Production company: Gallops Tallkies
- Release date: 26 July 2019
- Running time: 107 minutes
- Country: India
- Language: Gujarati

47 Dhansukh Bhawan is a 2019 one shot Gujarati thriller film written, directed and edited by Naiteek Ravval, produced by Naiteek Ravval himself and Rishi Vyas under banner of Gallops Tallkies. The film starring Shyam Nair, Rishi Vyas, Gaurav Paswala, Jay Bhatt and Hemang Vyas, revolves around an old house where mysterious things are happening. The film was released nationwide by Rupam Entertainment Pvt Ltd, on 26 July 2019.

== Cast ==
- Gaurav Paswala as Dhaval
- Rishi Vyas as Rishi
- Shyam Nair as Shyam
- Jay Bhatt as Balwant Bhai
- Hemang Vyas as Nayan

== Production ==
47 Dhansukh Bhawan is the first Gujarati one shot film. Which shoot in single shot without any cut. Music of the film is given by Shuchita Vyas and Sung by Bhoomi Trivedi. Zee Music Company is the official music label of the film

=== Development ===
The film was shot in Surat under the production of Gallops Tallkies. The first official poster of the film is released on 15 June 2019 and Teaser got released on 17 June 2019

== Release ==
The trailer of the film was released on 23 June 2019. The film was released on 26 July 2019.

== Soundtrack ==
47 Dhansukh Bhawan

Soundtrack album by Shuchita Vyas
- Released: 8 July 2019
- Recorded: 2019
- Genre: Feature film soundtrack
- Length: 4:31
- Label: Zee Music Company

The music of the film is composed by Shuchita Vyas and lyrics are by Jay Bhatt.

Track list
No.	Title	Lyrics	Singer(s)	Length
1.	"Shu Thai Che?"	Jay Bhatt	Bhoomi Trivedi	4:31
2.	"Shu Thai Gayu"	Jay Bhatt	Shuchita Vyas	4:02
Total length:				8:33
