= Vishnu Deva =

- Born: 18 May 1975 (age 51); Chennai, Tamil Nadu, India
- Occupation: Dance choreographer
- Years active: 1995–present
- Spouse: Kamla Nair
- Relatives: Nalini (actress)(sister)

Vishnu Deva (born 18 May 1975) is an Indian choreographer who has worked in Hindi, Tamil, Telugu, Malayalam, and Bengali and Nepali films. Since 2000, he has choreographed different types of dance styles, and is known for his work on the Bollywood movies Goliyon Ki Rasleela Ram-Leela (2013), Singh Is Bliing (2015), Baby (2015), R... Rajkumar (2013), Rowdy Rathore (2012), and Dabangg 2 (2012)"paaword"nepali movie.

== Early life and career ==
Born and raised in Chennai, Deva grew up watching his father, a well-known choreographer in Malayalam movies, working on dancing rehearsals, leading him to develop an interest in choreography. In 1995, he began working with choreographers including Chinni Prakash and Tharun Kumar. In 2000, he met and began working with choreographer Ganesh Acharya. In 2002, when Deva was working as an assistant choreographer on Shakti: The Power, he happened to meet choreographer Prabhu Deva, who later asked him to assist in the film Lakshya song "Main Aisa Kyon Hoon". Later, Prabhu Deva offered him solo choreography for the Telugu film Nuvvostanante Nenoddantana.

== Personal life ==
Deva is the brother of South Indian actress Nalini Ramarajan. He married Kamla Nair, the sister of Bollywood choreographer Ganesh Acharya, on 29 November 1998. The couple has one child, Aishwarya.

== Filmography ==
Film	Song	Year	Language	Notes
Aabra Ka Daabra		2004	Hindi	
Nuvvostanante Nenoddantana		2005	Telugu	
Priyasakhi		2005	Tamil	
Annavaram		2006	Telugu	
Pournami		2006	Telugu	
Chukkallo Chandrudu		2006	Telugu	
Something Something Unnakum Ennakum		2006	Tamil	
Pokkiri		2007	Tamil	
Delhii Heights		2007	Hindi	
Money Hai Toh Honey Hai		2008	Hindi	
Current		2009	Hindi	
Fast Forward		2009	Hindi	
Yuvan Yuvathi		2011	Tamil	
Bodyguard		2011	Hindi	
Vellore Maavattam		2011	Tamil	
Rowdy Rathore	Aa Re Pritam Pyaare	2012	Hindi	
Dabangg 2		2012	Hindi	
OMG – Oh My God!	Go Go Govinda	2012	Hindi	
Goliyon Ki Raasleela Ram-Leela	Ram Chahe Leela, Ishqiyan Dishqiya	2013	Hindi	
Adda		2013	Telugu	
Mr. Money	Boneless Biryani	2013	Hindi	Unreleased
R... Rajkumar	Gandi Baat, Sadi Ke Fall sa	2013	Hindi	
Ramaiya Vastavaiya		2013	Hindi	
Shortcut Romeo		2013	Hindi	
Desi Kattey	Patnewali hoon, Albeliya	2014	Hindi	
Action Jackson		2014	Hindi	
Baby		2015	Hindi	
Singh Is Bliing		2015	Hindi	
Kuch Kuch Locha Hai	Paaniwala Dance, Daaru peke Dance	2015	Hindi	
Kyaa Kool Hain Hum 3	Jawaani Le Doobi	2016	Hindi	
Ishq Forever	Bilkul Socha Na, Expectation and Title song	2016	Hindi	
Sarbjit	Tuglak Tuglak Tun	2016	Hindi	
Great Grand Masti		Upcoming	Hindi	
Baa Baa Black Sheep		2018	Hindi	
One Night Stand	Do Peg Maar, Ishq Da Sutta	2016	Hindi	
Kayamkulam Kochunni (2018 film)		2018	Malayalam	

== Awards ==
Apsara Film & Television Producers Guild Award

- Nominated, Apsara Award for Best Choreography in Goliyon Ki Raasleela Ram-Leela for the songs "Ishqyaun Dhishqyuan" & "Ram Chahe Leela"

Zee Cine Awards

- Nominated, Technical Award for Best Choreography in Rowdy Rathore for the song "Aa Re Pritam Pyare"
