= Carry On Maratha =

- Film poster
- Directed by: Sanjay Londhe
- Written by: Hrishikesh Koli; Dr D.S. Chougale; Sanjay Londhe
- Produced by: Nanda chandrabhan Thakur; Shashikala Kshirsagar
- Starring: Gashmeer Mahajani; Kashmira Kulkarni
- Cinematography: Arun Prasad
- Edited by: Ashish Mhatre-Apoorva Sahay Motiwale
- Music by: Shail Hada; Pritesh Mehta; D. Imman
- Production companies: Nanda Arts; Warrior Brothers Motion Pictures
- Distributed by: Indian Film Studio
- Release date: 24 July 2015
- Running time: 144 minutes
- Country: India
- Language: Marathi

Carry On Maratha is a 2015 Indian Marathi language romantic drama film directed by Sanjay Londhe. It was released theatrically on 24 July 2015. This film was directorial debut of Sanjay Londhe. It stars Gashmeer Mahajani and Kashmira Kulkarni in lead. It is the debut film of Gashmeer Mahajani, son of veteran Marathi actor Ravindra Mahajani. Box office collection of this movie is around 15 crore.

Upon Its theatrical release it received mixed reviews from critics, praised for acting but criticism for weak and predictable story, screenplay.

== Synopsis ==
Kolhapur's young Maratha, Martand comes across Kusum, a Kannada girl looking for a lift in the middle of the road. A chance encounter turns into a love story that brings both families face-to-face. Whether the Maratha warrior will be successful in love forms the crux of the story.

== Cast ==
- Gashmeer Mahajani as Maartand
- Kashmira Kulkarni as Kusum
- Arun Nalawade
- Amin Hajee
- Kareem Hajee
- Usha Naik
- Shantanu Moghe
- Devika Daftardar
- Kishori Ballal
- Prerana Ugale as Maartand's mother

== Production ==
'Malhari Martand' song was filmed at Khandoba Mandir of Jejuri.

== Soundtrack ==
Carry On Maratha

Soundtrack album by Shail – Pritesh
- Released: June 2015
- Genre: Film soundtrack
- Length: 23:05
- Label: Zee Music Company

The lyrics for the film were penned by Guru Thakur, Mangesh Kangane, Ashwini Shende and Hridayashiva, with music composed by Shail – Pritesh. Yuvarani (Soi Soi) song is composed by D. Imman.

=== Track listing ===
Carry On Maratha
No.	Title	Singer(s)	Length
1.	"Martand Malhari"	Shail Hada	4:59
2.	"Sobane So Yanire"	Shail Hada, Shreya Ghoshal	4:39
3.	"Mann Jaai Jitha"	Shail Hada, Vaishali Mhade, Shreyas Jadhav	4:02
4.	"Jagalgant"	Adarsh Shinde	3.27
5.	"Yuvarani (Soi Soi)"	Urmila Dhangar, D. Imman	3:39
6.	"Carry On Maratha (Title Song)"	Aditya Narayan, Bhoomi Trivedi	3:49
Total length:			23:05

== Reception ==
In Times of India review Mihir Bhange mentioned this film have romance, drama, action and dash comedy. It have all the elements that goes in to making crowd pleaser and gave it 3/5 star. In Maharashtra Times review by Soumitra Pote, he gave it 2/5 star, praised for Gashmeer Mahajan tough appearance but criticised for predictable, weak screenplay, story and not giving more attention to Marathi- Kanadi conflict. Diwya Marathi gave it 2.5/5 stars. In Prahar news web review it was praised for female lead's acting but criticised for screenplay.
