= Mor Bani Thanghat Kare =

Popular Gujarati song

Mor Bani Thanghat Kare (Gujarati: મોર બની થનગાટ કરે), originally titled Navi Varsha (Gujarati: નવી વર્ષા) is a 1944 Gujarati song translated by poet Jhaverchand Meghani which was published in his anthology Ravindra-Veena (1944). It was later composed by Hemu Gadhavi. The song is a loosely translated version of "Navavarsha" (lit. New Rain) by Rabindranath Tagore.

Meghani had heard the song from Tagore himself in 1920 at his home in Calcutta. He wrote the Gujarati version in 1944 after the death of Tagore in 1941. It was translated in Gujarati in the traditional tone of Charans. It is sung by several other singers such as Chetan Gadhvi and Ashit Desai. The song is also used in title credits of 2013 Hindi film Goliyon Ki Raasleela Ram-Leela directed by Sanjay Leela Bhansali where it is sung by Gujarati folk singer Osman Mir.
