= Maharana Pratap: The First Freedom Fighter =

- Official Poster
- Directed by: Dr Pradeep Kumawat
- Written by: Dr Pradeep Kumawat
- Starring: Kuldeep Chaturvedi
- Cinematography: Manmohan Bhatnagar
- Edited by: Preetam Naik
- Music by: Jagjit Singh; Shail Hada; Roop Kumar Rathod; Sadhana Sargam; Bhupinder Singh; Dr Prem Bhandari
- Production companies: Alok Audio Visuals Pvt. Ltd & Alok Sanskar Vision Films
- Release date: October 12, 2012
- Running time: 145 minutes
- Country: India
- Language: Hindi

Maharana Pratap: The First Freedom Fighter is an Indian epic film based on Maharana Pratap of Mewar (a state in north-western India).The film is directed and produced by Dr. Pradeep Kumawat from Udaipur, Rajasthan. It is the first time that a film has been made on the history of Maharana Pratap. The film's sound track includes one of the last songs sung by Late Jagjit Singh.

On 18 January 2012, the then President of India, Pratibha Patil unveiled the Music of the film.

The story centers around the warrior Maharana Pratap and his conflicts with Akbar and Man Singh I, leading to the Battle of Haldighati. Maharana Pratap wins the battle of haldighati The film was released in major parts of Rajasthan on 12 October 2012.

In May 2022, the film was released on the OTT platform MX Player.

== Plot ==
The story of Maharana Pratap starts with the narrator Ramanbhai who narrates the epic of Maharana Pratap and initiates the history of the Mewar kingdom. When Vallabhi (Gujarat) was attacked by the Maan Mori in a battle attempt, Rawal Mahendra-II died and his queen Pushpawati somehow escaped from that attack and went to the Nagda area (near Udaipur). Later she died, giving her child to a Brahmin family. The son of the queen Pushpawati grew up young and was popularly known as Bappa Rawal (Kalbhoj). One day Bappa Rawal met Maharshi Harti Rashi (a sage) and with the profound blessings of the sage Harit Rashi, Bappa established the Great kingdom of Mewar. Narrator Kaviraj Shyamaldas proceeds further in the story as follows: Rana Ratan Singh's wife queen Padmini, who was an iconic paramount of beauty in historical times, faced bad consequences due to Allauddin Khilji intrigue and deception of forceful control over Chittorgarh as well as over queen Padmini. At the end the conflict between Padmini and Allauddhin Khilji led the last queen Padmini to sacrifice herself for the self-respect and honour of the dynasty by jumping alive in the heap of fire inside the palace at fort Chittor (the activity is popularly known as 'Saka/'Jauhar').

Narrator Kaviraj Shyamaldas's pen stops at the incident of king Udai Singh's feeding his mother Panna Gurjari. The maid's son Banveer (dasi's son) who killed Rana Vikramaditya, was intending to kill Udai Singh in his childhood as well. Pannadhay then sacrificed her own son who was at the same age as Udai Singh and Banveer killed her son by having the impression that the sleeping child was Udai Singh. She saw her own son dying in front of her eyes. This sacrifice of Pannadhay is remembered in the history, which ultimately saved the dynasty of Mewar.

As the story goes further. Maharana Udai Singh, father of Maharana Pratap was compelled to depart the fort of Chittorgarh. On the other hand, queen Jaiwnti bai who was the first wife of Maharana Udai Singh was facing an ignoring attitude from Udai Singh. The Maharana Udai Singh was immensely fascinated towards queen Bhattiyani. The diplomatic queen Bhattiyani passionately devised a plan to establish Jagmal (her son) on the throne of Mewar so as to make him the king. After the death of Udai Singh, the elder son Pratap was not offered the royal seat of the kingdom of Mewar. In the meantime, all the noble heads came to know about Jagamal being made the heir. Apparently ministers within the kingdom discussed the dismissal of Jagmal. Rawat Krishna Das and Rawat Sanga suggested that "pratap is the eldest son, and worthy also, hence, he should be the Maharana." After completing the last rites, the noble chieftains helped Pratap occupy the Royal Throne and spoke to Jagamal – "In your capacity as the younger brother, your seat is in front of the Royal Throne". Thus, on 28 February 1572 Pratap's coronation was performed at Gogunda (place near Udaipur) just after the funeral of Udai Singh. Pratap's coronation was held at Rana Bawari and he was enthroned on royal seat of the kingdom of Mewar unanimously in 1572.

Maharana Pratap was leading the way with his knighthood, chivalry and art of battling; at the same time emperor Jalal ud-Din Muhammad Akbar of Mughal dynasty (who persecuted king Udai Singh from Chittor) was now ready to tackle the conflict in the form of a battle. However, as a diplomat, his strategy was to avoid the battle and motivate other kings to surrender in front of him, but Maharana Pratap was an exception.

Pratap won the battle of Gorwar. Akbar with his kingdom-oriented strategies sent many proposals to Mewar as Akbar was of the opinion that Mewar is the biggest hurdle in the path of expanding the domain of his kingdom. A special delegation was sent by Akbar thrice to persuade and convince Maharana Pratap that he shall accept the Mughal rule and Mewar should work under Akbar's imperial kingdom. The special delegation consisted of Rana Bhagwandas, Todermal and Man Singh. They requested Maharna Pratap to accept Akbar's proposal. Kunwar Man Singh of Amber came to Udaipur. There was a grand dinner organised at the bank of lake Udaisagar. But Maharana Pratap decided not to attend that dinner. Pratap sent his son Kunwar Amar Singh to dine with Kunwar Man Singh, which ultimately led to an argument between Dodhia Bhim and Man Singh. This incident precipitated the Mughal-Mewar conflict. The aftermath of this argumentation was the battle of Haldighati.

Battle of Haldighati

The Mughals marched south towards the village of Haldighati where a pass accessed the terrain of Pratap Singh and his temporary capital of Kumbhalgarh. Emperor Akbar decided to fight a battle and invaded Mewar. Emperor Akbar sent Man Singh as a Chief of his Imperial army and this incident is popularly known as the battle of Haldighati. It took place on 18 June 1576. In the month of June with boiling temperatures, battle started in the narrow path of valley. Pratap attacked Man Singh, but he hid himself under the shelter of seating stands on elephant rider, thereby only rider was killed. In this battle Hakim Khan Suri, Rawat Netsingh, Jhala Maan, Jhala Bida, Gwalior's king Raamshah Tanwar, Nalwahan, Shaliwahan were killed as martyrs. Here Pratap was surrounded by Mughal imperial army, at the same time Jhala Maan traded the crown with Pratap. Jhala Maan set a unique example of loyalty, bravery and courage by sacrificing his life to save the life of Pratap. Jhala Maan holding royal insignia urged Pratap to leave the battlefield. Pratap's horse Chetak was wounded by the sword, which was hidden in the trunk of Man Singh's elephant. Ultimately Chetak died while crossing the terrain. Chetak equally shares the respect that has been given to the legendary warrior Maharana Pratap in the history. In the textbooks the battle ends within three hours of a short span, but the fact is that the battle of Haldighati which started on 18 June 1576, actually carried about a month long and ended at Gogunda. The battle was truly a symbol of the raw courage, an epitome towards nation's love, spirit of sacrifice and loyalty of the Rajputs towards the defence of their motherland.

It was one of the toughest times for Mughal army as they were compelled to eat unripe mangoes and horse's meat and were forced to leave Mewar at last. Maharana Pratap displayed indomitable courage and bravery in the battle of Haldighati, he won the battle of Haldighati finally displaying the apocalyptic and splendiferous attitude of a true knight. Akbar invaded the land of Mewar many times but Rana Kika (Pratap) never surrendered in front of him.

Under the leadership of Shahbaz Khan, Mewar was invaded several times, but Pratap escaped from every attempt of Mughals. In the Diwer valley, enormous battle took place between Mughals and Mewar. Maharana Pratap confronted 40 Mughal's cantonment and Mughal army faced extreme defeat. At the end Maharana Pratap established the capital of Mewar named 'Chawand' in Mewar area and promoted agriculture, music and art. Further leading towards success in his serene, sublime and peaceful kingdom. There came an immense tragic and disheartening day in the life of Pratap when while tightening the string of a bow with arrow, a muscle contracted in the intestine causing internal bleeding. Pratap fell down on the surface and died in Chawand.

== Music ==
Maharana Pratap: The First Freedom Fighter

Soundtrack album by Jagjit Singh, Shail Hada, Roop Kumar Rathod, Sadhana Sargam, Bhupinder Singh & Dr Prem Bhandari
- Released: 2012
- Studios: InSync Studios, Anupam Studios & Sangeet Audio Visual Studios (Mumbai)
- Genre: Feature film soundtrack
- Label: T-Series
- Producer: Dr Prem Bhandari (Composer)

The official music was released by the Hon'ble President of India Smt. Pratibha Patil on 18 January 2012.

#	Title	Singer(s)	Duration
1	"Har Har Mahadev.."	Shail Hada & chorus	4:58
2	"Mayad Tharo wo Put Kathai"	Shail Hada	6:44
3	"Yaad Aayega"	Jagjit Singh	5:02
4	"Ye lahu roti hui sham"	Bhupinder Singh	6:28
5	"Veer Pratap"	Roop Kumar Rathod	6:22
6	"Rana dheer dharam rakhwala"	Dr Prem Bhandari	6:22
7	"Pag ghungharu bandh Meera"	Sadhana Sargam	5:02
8	"Neela Ghoda"	Roop Kumar Rathod	5:02
9	"Tha Hawaon Se Bhi Tej"	Roop Kumar Rathod	2:21

== Reception ==
Film received a great response from the public right after its premiere which was held at MLSU Auditorium, Udaipur on 11 October 2012. Various newspaper (State Based) reviewed the film and gave a "Must Watch" rating. The roles of Akbar, Man Singh & Dodhiya Bheem were highly appreciated. The demand increased across the state on very next day. The director of the film is said to be rescheduling its release across the nation.

== Current Status and Future of the film ==
In an interview (March 2014), the Director of the film said "We are facing a lot of financial as well as social trouble in releasing the movie all over the nation. Without any proper sponsor we have already spent a huge amount of money on it, yet it is not enough for a National release. All I can say is that 'We are still struggling for its bright future'."

In May 2022, after 10 years of continuous efforts to release the film, it was released on OTT platform MX Player
