= GiMA Award for Best Female Playback Singer =

The GiMA Best Female Playback Singer Award is given by Global Indian Music Academy as a part of its annual Global Indian Music Academy Awards to recognise a female playback singer who has delivered an outstanding performance in a film song.

== Superlatives ==
Superlative	Singer	Record
Most awards	Shreya Ghoshal	2
Most nominations	Shreya Ghoshal	7
Most nominations without ever winning	Rekha Bhardwaj (2011, 2015), Monali Thakur (2014, 2016)	2
Most nominations in a single year	Sunidhi Chauhan (2011), Shreya Ghoshal (2012)	3

== List of winners ==
- 2010 Kavita Seth for "Iktara" – Wake Up Sid
- 2011 Sunidhi Chauhan for "Sheila Ki Jawani" – Tees Maar Khan
  - Mamta Sharma for "Munni Badnaam Hui" – Dabangg
  - Sunidhi Chauhan for "Ainvayi Ainvayi" – Band Baaja Baaraat
  - Sunidhi Chauhan for "Udi" – Guzaarish
  - Usha Uthup & Rekha Bhardwaj for "Darling" – 7 Khoon Maaf
- 2012 Nandini Srikar for "Bhare Naina" – Ra.One
  - Harshdeep Kaur for "Katiya Karun" – Rockstar
  - Shreya Ghoshal for "Chikni Chameli" – Agneepath
  - Shreya Ghoshal for "Saibo" – Shor in the City
  - Shreya Ghoshal for "Ooh La La" – The Dirty Picture
  - Sunidhi Chauhan for "Gun Gun Guna" – Agneepath
- 2013 – No award given
- 2014 Shreya Ghoshal for "Sunn Raha Hai" – Aashiqui 2
  - Bhoomi Trivedi for "Ram Chahe Leela" – Goliyon Ki Raasleela Ram-Leela
  - Monali Thakur for "Sawaar Loon" – Lootera
  - Shreya Ghoshal for "Banarasiya" – Raanjhanaa
  - Sunidhi Chauhan for "Kamli" – Dhoom 3
- 2015 Kanika Kapoor for "Baby Doll" – Ragini MMS 2
  - Alia Bhatt for "Samjhawan (Unplugged)" – Humpty Sharma Ki Dulhania
  - Nandini Srikar for "Harjaiyaan" – Queen
  - Nooran Sisters for "Pataka Guddi" – Highway
  - Rekha Bhardwaj for "Aaj Ke Naam" – Haider
  - Sunidhi Chauhan for "Tu Kuja" – Highway
- 2016 Shreya Ghoshal for "Deewani Mastani" – Bajirao Mastani
  - Kanika Kapoor for "Chittiyaan Kalaiyaan" – Roy
  - Alka Yagnik for "Agar Tum Saath Ho" – Tamasha
  - Jyoti Nooran for "Ghani Bawri" – Tanu Weds Manu Returns
  - Shreya Ghoshal for "Mohe Rang Do Laal" – Bajirao Mastani
  - Monali Thakur for "Moh Moh Ke Dhaage" – Dum Laga Ke Haisha
- 2017- "No Award given"

== See also ==
- List of music awards honoring women
- Bollywood
- Cinema of India
