= Nagada Sang Dhol =

Song by Sanjay Leela Bhansali, performed by Shreya Ghoshal and Osman Mir

- Picture sleeve with Deepika Padukone

Song by Shreya Ghoshal and Osman Mir

from the album Goliyon Ki Raasleela Ram-Leela
- Language: Hindi
- Released: 2 October 2013
- Studio: AVA, Mumbai
- Genre: Filmi, Gujarati folk
- Length: 4:33
- Label: Eros Now; Sony Music India
- Songwriters: Siddharth-Garima, Sanjay Leela Bhansali
- Producer: Sanjay Leela Bhansali

Music video
- "Nagada Sang Dhol" on YouTube

"Nagada Sang Dhol" is a Garba song from the 2013 Hindi film, Goliyon Ki Raasleela Ram-Leela. Composed by Sanjay Leela Bhansali, the song is sung by Shreya Ghoshal and Osman Mir, with lyrics penned by Siddharth-Garima. The song features Deepika Padukone, Ranveer Singh and Supriya Pathak in the video.

== Development ==
"Nagada Sang Dhol" is recorded at AVA Studios in Mumbai. The song is mixed and mastered by Tanay Gajjar and arranged and produced by Tubby-Parik. The song was choreographed by Samir & Arsh Tanna. The duo complimented Deepika Padukone for her efforts though she sustained major bruises and swellings on her feet while performing some heavy-duty dance steps. It was reported that the actress stuck to the routine and shot for the song on the allotted schedule sporting medical braces to relax her movements. The shooting of the song took ten days at an expensive set put up at Film City. Sanjay Leela Bhansali brought over traditional Garba dancers from Gujarat to teach the Garba in the traditional way to Padukone.

== Release ==
A promo of the song was uploaded on Eros Now YouTube page on 12 October 2013. The full audio song was released on 2 October 2013 along with other songs of the album. The number was released just in time for the Navratri festival that has Dandiya nights for nine days, full of Garba dance. The song was available at iTunes the same day of release and for online streaming at Saavn on 7 October 2013 and at Gaana the following day.

== Picturization ==
The video of the song shows Deepika Padukone performing Gujarati traditional garba dance in a red lehenga choli. The song begins with a teary-eyed Deepika lighting up diyas and performing garba with vengeance. The song's video was praised highly for Padukone's dancing skills and its Gujarati flavour.

== Reception ==
Upon its release, the song was compared with Aishwarya Rai Bachchan's "Dholi Taro Dhol Baaje" in Bhansali's 1999 superhit, Hum Dil De Chuke Sanam for the similarities.

The song turned extremely popular among youth and garba lovers. It was reportedly heard playing during the entire Dandiya festival that year. Due to its popularity and high demand, the singer of the song, Shreya Ghoshal, performed this number in many of her concerts. On September 30, 2013 the limited video of the song was released on the YouTube channel of Eros Now and had 95,463,174 views as of February 22, 2019. The full video of the song was released on February 27, 2014 and had 154,848,066 views as of April 30, 2020.

== Critical reception ==
Apart from the folk music composition by Sanjay Leela Bhansali, Shreya Ghoshal's rendition of the song is acclaimed. Critic Mohar Basu, reviewing the song for Koimoi, praised Ghoshal's singing and its "charming" folk music and selected it as her personal favourite. Critic Rajiv Vijayakar, reviewing for Bollywood Hungama, praised the composition and the "electrifying" vocals by Ghoshal and described the song as the "piece-de-resistance" of the album. Critic Joginder Tuteja, reviewing for Rediff.com considered the song to be the highlight of the album.

== Accolades ==
Year	Award	Nominee	Category	Result	Ref.
2014	Filmfare Awards	Shreya Ghoshal	Best Female Playback Singer	Nominated	
2014	Filmfare Awards	Sameer Tanna, Arsh Tanna	Best Choreography	Nominated	
2014	Screen Awards	Sameer Tanna, Arsh Tanna	Best Choreography	Nominated	
2013	BIG Star Entertainment Awards	Deepika Padukone	Most Entertaining Dancer	Nominated	
2013	BIG Star Entertainment Awards	Shreya Ghoshal	Most Entertaining Singer (Female)	Nominated	
2013	BIG Star Entertainment Awards	Sanjay Leela Bhansali, Shreya Ghoshal	Most Entertaining Song	Nominated	
