= Producers Guild Film Award for Best Female Playback Singer =

Annual Indian film award

The following is the list of winners and nominees of Apsara best female playback Records: Most awards to female singer, Shreya Ghoshal, was four times.

== Superlatives ==
Superlatives	Recipient	
Most awards	Shreya Ghoshal	4
Most nominations	Shreya Ghoshal	16
Most nominations in a single year	Shreya Ghoshal	4 (2015)
Most consecutive awards	Shreya Ghoshal	3 (2008–2010)
Most consecutive nominations	Shreya Ghoshal	11 (2008–2013)

== Winners and Nominees ==
=== 2000s ===
- 2004 Alka Yagnik - "Oodhni" - Tere Naam
  - Anuradha Paudwal - "Intezaar" - Paap
  - Chitra - "Koi Mil Gaya" - Koi Mil Gaya
  - Sunidhi Chauhan - "Bhaage Re Mann" - Chameli
  - Vasundhara Das - "It's the time to Disco" - Kal Ho Na Ho
- 2005 - No award
- 2006 Alisha Chinai - "Kajra Re" Bunty aur Babli
  - Alka Yagnik - "Hum Tum" - Hum Tum
  - Shreya Ghosal - "Piyu Bole" - Parineeta
  - Shubha Mudgal - Bawaaa Mann - Hazaaron Khwaishein Aisi
  - Sunidhi Chauhan – "Dhoom Machale" - Dhoom
- 2007 – No award
- 2008 Shreya Ghoshal - "Barso Re" - Guru
  - Alisha Chinai - "Its Rocking" - Kya Love Story Hai
  - Shreya Ghoshal - "Yeh Ishq Haaye" Jab We Met
  - Sunidhi Chauhan - "Sajna Vaari" - Honeymoon Travels Pvt. Ltd.
  - Sunidhi Chauhan - "Aaja Nachle" - Aaja Nachle
- 2009 Shreya Ghoshal - Teri Ore - Singh Is King
  - Anupama, Tanvi, Darshana – Pappu Can't Dance - Jaane Tu Ya Jaane Na
  - Dominique Cerejo – "Ye Tumhari Meri Baatien" - Rock On!!
  - Monali Thakur – "Zara Zara Touch Me" - Race
  - Shreya Ghoshal – Ahista Ahista - Bachna Ae Haseeno

=== 2010s ===
- 2010 Shreya Ghoshal - "Tujh Mein Rab Dikhta Hai" - Rab Ne Bana Di Jodi
  - Alisha Chinai – "Tera Hone Laga Hoon" - Ajab Prem Ki Ghazab Kahani
  - Shreya Ghoshal – "Aaj Dil Gustak Hai" – Blue
  - Sunidhi Chauhan – "Chor Bazari"- Love Aaj Kal
  - Suzanne – "Aye Bachoo" – Ghajini
- 2011 Sunidhi Chauhan - "Sheila Ki Jawani" - Tees Maar Khan and Mamta Sharma - "Munni Badnaam Hui" - Dabangg
  - Richa Sharma – "Sajda" - My Name is Khan
  - Sona Mohapatra & Shreya Ghoshal - "Bahaara" - I Hate Luv Storys
  - Sunidhi Chauhan - "Ainvayi Ainvayi" - Band Baaja Baaraat
  - Tulsi Kumar - "Tum Jo Aaye" - Once Upon A Time In Mumbaai
- 2012 Shreya Ghoshal - "Teri Meri" - Bodyguard
  - Harshdeep Kaur – "Katiya Karu" - Rockstar
  - Neha Bhasin - "Dhunki" - Mere Brother Ki Dulhan
  - Shreya Ghoshal - "Saibo" - Shor in the City
  - Sunidhi Chauhan - "Te Amo" - Dum Maaro Dum
  - Sunidhi Chauhan - Aa Zara Murder 2
- 2013 Shalmali Kholgade – "Pareshan" - Ishaqzaade
  - Hamsika Iyer - "Raabta" (Female Version) – Agent Vinod
  - Kavita Seth – "Tum Hi Ho Bandhu" - Cocktail
  - Neeti Mohan - "Ishq Wala Love" - Student Of The Year
  - Rekha Jha & Khushboo Raa - "Womaniya" - Gangs Of Wasseypur
  - Shreya Ghoshal – "Saans" - Jab Tak Hai Jaan
  - Shreya Ghoshal – "Chikni Chameli" - Agneepath
- 2014 Bhoomi Trivedi – "Ram Chahe Leela" - Goliyon Ki Raasleela: Ram-Leela
  - Aditi Paul - "Ang Laga De" & "Mor Bani Thanghat Kari" - Goliyon Ki Raasleela: Ram-Leela
  - Chinmayi - "Main Rang Sharbaton Ka" - Phata Poster Nikhla Hero
  - Monali Thakur - "Sawar Loon" - Lootera
  - Rekha Bhardwaj - "Ghagra" & "Kabira" - Yeh Jawaani Hai Deewani
  - Sona Mohapatra - "Ambarsariya" - Fukrey
- 2015 Kanika Kapoor - "Baby Doll" - Ragini MMS 2
  - Shreya Ghoshal - "Aa Raat Bhar" - Heropanti
  - Shreya Ghoshal - "Samjhawan" - Humpty Sharma Ki Dulhania
  - Shreya Ghoshal - "Manwa Laage" - Happy New Year
  - Shreya Ghoshal - "Chaar Kadam" - PK
  - Sultana Nooran, Jyoti Nooran - "Patakha Guddi" - Highway
- 2016 Monali Thakur – "Moh Moh Ke Dhaage" – Dum Laga Ke Haisha
  - Sunidhi Chauhan – "Girls Like to Swing" – Dil Dhadakne Do
  - Palak Muchhal – "Prem Ratan Dhan Payo" – Prem Ratan Dhan Payo
  - Kanika Kapoor – "Chittiyaan Kalaiyaan" – Roy
  - Rekha Bhardwaj – "Zinda" – Talvar
  - Swati Sharma – "Banno" – Tanu Weds Manu Returns
  - Alka Yagnik – "Agar Tum Saath Ho" – Tamasha
  - Jyoti Nooran – "Ghani Bawri" – Tanu Weds Manu Returns

== See also ==
- List of music awards honoring women

== See also ==
- Producers Guild Film Awards
- Bollywood
