= Hemu Gadhavi =

Gujarati singer and composer (1929–1965)

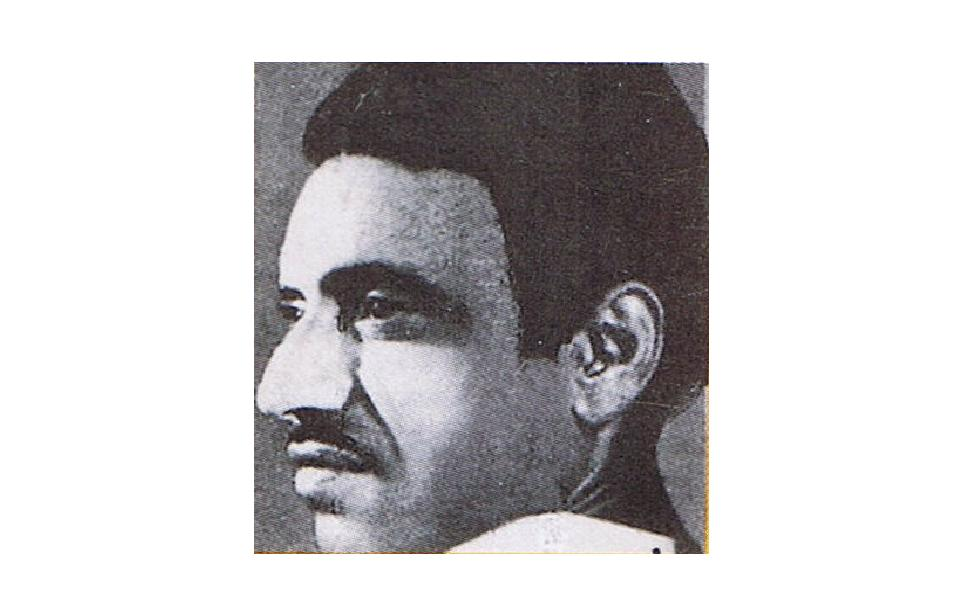
- Born: 4 September 1929; Dhankania, Sayla, Gujarat, India
- Died: 20 August 1965 (aged 35); Paddhari, Gujarat
- Known for: Singer; Composer; Playwright
- Children: Biharidan Gadhavi

Hemu Gadhavi, also spelled Hemu Gadhvi, (4 September 1929 – 20 August 1965) was a Gujarati singer, songwriter, composer, playwright, and actor. He was an exponent of folk-music of Saurashtra.

== Early life and family ==
Hemu Gadhavi was born on 4 September 1929 in the village of Dhankania in Sayla taluka of Surendranagar district in Gujarat. His father's name was Nanbha Gadhavi and mother's name was Baluba Gadhavi. His wife's name was Hariba Gadhavi. His son Biharidan Gadhavi is also a singer.

Gadhavi was fond of folk songs and hymns from his childhood. At the age of 14, he joined Shakti Prabhav Kalamandir with a salary of Rs. 15 per month. He played the role of Krishna in the first play Muralidhar and captivated the minds of the people with his performance. During that play, he sang the first song "Gamdu Mujne Pyare Gokul". At Jamnagar, he successfully performed the female role of Ranakdevi in a play called Ranakdevi. Gradually, he began to study Charan literature and used it in singing folk songs and performing plays. Therefore, till 1955, he started working in Wankaner Drama Company and Rajkot's Chaitanya Drama Company.

== Career ==
In 1955, Gadhavi was invited to work at All Indian Radio (Akashvani) by Gijubhai Vyas and Chandrakantbhai Bhatt who saw Hemu very closely during the plays. So he joined Akashvani Rajkot as a Tanpura artist. During that time, he studied the literature of Zaverchand Meghani and Dula Bhaya Kag and gave voice to folk music and delivered it to the homes of Gujarat through Akashwani. Thus they Till 19, he served in Rajkot All India Radio.

In 1962/63, the Columbia Company released their album by Hemu Gadhavi titled Sony Halaman May Ujali. In addition, His Master's Voice released records like Shivaji Nu Halardu, Ame Mahiyara Re and Morbi ni Vaniyan which became very popular throughout Gujarat. Apart from this, he had done memorable plays like Satyavadi Raja Harishchandra and Prithviraj Chauhan.

== Death ==
On 20 August 1965, Hemu Gahdavi was affected by dizziness due to hemorrhage while recording Rasadas at Akashwani-Paddhari. Thus, he died after at a young age of 36.

== Late Hemu Gadhavi Smriti Sansthan Trust ==
The 'Late Hemu Gadhavi Smriti Sansthan Trust', established in his memory, inaugurated folk music activities, media management as well as a memorial in the name of Hemtirth at his hometown Dhankania in 2013.

== Awards ==
- Best Folk Music Award by the President of India, Sarvapalli Radhakrishnan.
- Best Folk Singer's Pride Award by Gujarat Government
- Best Playback Singer Award for the Gujarati film, 'Kasumbi No Rang'

== Legacy ==
=== Hemu Gadhavi Marg ===
The Rajkot Municipal Corporation named the highway in the city of Rajkot as 'Hemu Gadhavi Marg'.

=== Hemu Gadhavi Hall ===
Hemu Gadhavi Hall is an auditorium in the Rajkot city of Gujarat. It was inaugurated on 11 August 1998 and was named after Hemu Gadhavi.
