= Goliyon Ki Raasleela Ram-Leela =

2013 Indian film by Sanjay Leela Bhansali

- Theatrical release poster
- Directed by: Sanjay Leela Bhansali
- Screenplay by: Siddharth-Garima; Sanjay Leela Bhansali
- Dialogues by: Siddharth Garima
- Based on: Romeo and Juliet by William Shakespeare
- Produced by: Kishore Lulla; Sanjay Leela Bhansali
- Starring: Ranveer Singh; Deepika Padukone
- Cinematography: Ravi Varman
- Edited by: Rajesh G. Pandey; Sanjay Leela Bhansali
- Music by: Score: Monty Sharma; Songs: Sanjay Leela Bhansali; Hemu Gadhavi
- Production companies: Bhansali Productions; Eros International
- Distributed by: Eros International
- Release date: 15 November 2013
- Running time: 155 minutes
- Country: India
- Language: Hindi
- Budget: ₹88 crore
- Box office: ₹201.4 crore

Goliyon Ki Raasleela Ram-Leela (transl. A Dance of Bullets: Ram-Leela), also simply known as Ram-Leela, is a 2013 Indian Hindi-language romantic gangster tragedy film written, co-produced, and directed by Sanjay Leela Bhansali, and also composed its original soundtrack. The film was jointly produced by Bhansali and Eros International's Kishore Lulla and stars Ranveer Singh and Deepika Padukone in lead roles with Priyanka Chopra making a special appearance in the song "Ram Chahe Leela". The supporting cast includes Supriya Pathak, Richa Chadda, Sharad Kelkar, Gulshan Devaiah, Barkha Bisht Sengupta, and Abhimanyu Singh. Based on the tragedy Romeo and Juliet by William Shakespeare, Ram-Leela narrates the star-crossed romance between the two eponymous lovers from two gangster families, who fall in love with each other but are forced to separate due to their families' centuries-old rivalry.

Bhansali conceived Ram-Leela while working on his directorial debut Khamoshi: The Musical ; an insufficient budget led to the project being postponed. After reviving the project in 2012, Singh and Padukone were cast in the lead roles over many other choices. Principal photography began in Gujarat before moving to Rajasthan. Much of the filming was done on sets, despite previous plans against doing so. The background score was composed by Monty Sharma, while the lyrics were written by Siddharth–Garima.

The film's release, scheduled for 15 November 2013, was initially stayed by the Delhi High Court. The film, initially titled Ram-Leela, was changed to Goliyon Ki Raasleela Ram-Leela in response to an order by the court, allowing it to be released on the scheduled date. It received positive reviews, with praise directed to the performances of the cast members, particularly Singh, Padukone, and Pathak, as well as the soundtrack, and with some criticism of the plot and the elements of violence. Ram-Leela earned ₹220.58 crore in its theatrical run and emerged as the sixth highest-grossing Hindi film of 2013.

Ram-Leela received eight nominations at the Filmfare Awards, winning three, including the Filmfare Award for Best Actress for Padukone and the Filmfare Award for Best Supporting Actress for Pathak. At the International Indian Film Academy Awards, it received nine nominations, including for Best Film, and won two.

== Plot ==
In the lawless Gujarati village of Ranjhaar, known for its illicit firearms manufacturing, the Rajadi and Sanera clans have maintained a violent blood feud for 500 years. Tensions erupt when Bhavani, a Sanera, shoots at the son of the Rajadi chieftain, Meghji Bhai. Meghji tries to kill Bhavani in retaliation, but his younger brother, Ram, intervenes to save him. Unlike his heavily armed kinsmen, Ram is a free-spirited wanderer who, despite dealing in black-market cars, actively seeks a peaceful truce between the factions.

During the festival of Holi, Ram sneaks into the Sanera compound and meets Leela, the fierce daughter of the Sanera matriarch, Dhankor Baa. The two instantly fall in love. However, their secret romance is shattered when Leela's protective older brother, Kanji Bhai, accidentally kills Ram's older brother in a skirmish. Driven by grief and tribal duty, Ram confronts and kills Kanji. Taking advantage of the ensuing chaos, Ram and Leela elope and marry in secret at a remote lodge. Before they can settle, Ram's friends betray his location to the Saneras. Bhavani tracks them down and forcibly abducts Leela, while Ram is dragged back by the Rajadis. Instead of being punished, Ram is hailed as a tribal hero for compromising Leela's reputation and is appointed the new Rajadi chieftain.

Back at the Sanera estate, Dhankor Baa attempts to force Leela into an arranged marriage with a wealthy expatriate. When Leela refuses and displays her wedding ring, her mother cuts off her ring finger in a rage. Upon hearing of her mutilation, Ram cuts off his own finger in solidarity. Desperate to escape, Leela sends her widowed sister-in-law, Rasila, to deliver a message to Ram. Instead, Ram's undisciplined guards assault Rasila. Learning of the attack, a vindictive Dhankor Baa retaliates by ordering her men to assault Kesar, Meghji’s widow, but she evades.

Hoping to end the escalating violence, Ram storms into the Sanera mansion to propose a formal peace treaty. Dhankor Baa seemingly agrees and invites him to celebrate Navratri, though her true intention is to have him assassinated. However, during the festival, Bhavani secretly shoots and severely injures Dhankor Baa, planning to frame the Rajadis and claim leadership of the clan. With her mother incapacitated, Leela ascends as the new Sanera chieftain. Embittered by the endless cycle of violence, Leela meets with Ram to negotiate a strict territorial division of the village's trades, stipulating that the two clans must never interact again.

Bhavani exploits Leela's new administrative authority, tricking her into signing an execution order that authorizes a surprise massacre of the Rajadis. During the Dussehra celebrations, the Saneras launch a coordinated assault, killing numerous Rajadi clansmen and bringing the village to the brink of an all-out civil war.

Realizing that their positions as rival chieftains will permanently prevent them from being together, Ram and Leela rendezvous at their secret meeting place. They embrace one last time and shoot each other dead in a mutual suicide pact. They die oblivious to the fact that a recovering Dhankor Baa has experienced a change of heart after interacting with Kesar and Meghji's young son. She executes the treacherous Bhavani and orders an immediate ceasefire, but she arrives too late to save the young lovers. United in collective grief, the Rajadis and Saneras call a permanent truce and come together to cremate the bodies of Ram and Leela.

== Cast ==
- Ranveer Singh as Ram Rajadi, based on Romeo
- Deepika Padukone as Leela Sanera, based on Juliet
- Supriya Pathak Kapur as Dhankor Sanera based on Lady Capulet
- Richa Chadha as Rasila, based on Nurse
- Gulshan Devaiah as Bhavani, based on Paris
- Sharad Kelkar as Kanji Bhai, based on Tybalt
- Abhimanyu Singh as Meghji Bhai, based on Mercutio
- Raza Murad as Sarpanch, based on Prince Escalus
- Homi Wadia as Radhu Bhai
- Jameel Khan as Vanka
- Barkha Sengupta as Kesar
- Anshul Trivedi as Mandar
- Tarun Anand as Ujjwal
- Masood Akhtar as Pujalal
- Mukesh Agrohari as Vallu
- Faizan Khan as Goli, Meghji Bhai and Kesar's son
- Banwari Jhol as Popat
- Priyanka Chopra in the song "Ram Chahe Leela" (special appearance)

== Production ==
=== Development ===
Bhansali conceived Ram-Leela while directing Khamoshi: The Musical. The latter was critically acclaimed but commercially unsuccessful, leaving Bhansali with no money to fund Ram-Leela. He next directed Hum Dil De Chuke Sanam instead, which was also set in Gujarat like Ram-Leela. Feeling that directing two films set in the same place would be repetitive, Bhansali waited. He intended the film to be a tribute to Gujarat, saying, "I am Gujarati at heart. I love Gujarat's music, culture and food and I want to take all this back to the people." The film was dedicated to Bhansali's mother Leela. According to him, Ram-Leela was his "most violent film" at that point, while the filmmaking style was similar to his previous directional ventures Hum Dil De Chuke Sanam and Devdas.

Bhansali called it a "desi adaptation" of William Shakespeare's tragedy Romeo and Juliet. He clarified that Ram-Leela is not related to Rama or Krishna and that the character Ram does not depict the Hindu god. Speaking about the influence of his childhood environment on the film, Bhansali said that his family members used to speak "the most outrageously uninhibited things as though they were the most natural". He felt that the language heard by him were idioms for the current generation, who speak directly. Bhansali found it "very liberating to explore the union of body and mind in a love-relationship" and felt that it wasn't enough "to show a boy and a girl looking at one another when they fall in love". The lovers don't have sex together in the film as Bhansali felt the importance of showing the lovers "united completely in death".

Terming Romeo and Juliet as "the mother of all love stories", Bhansali wanted to make a different story with it, one that was not yet explored in cinematic adaptations. While changing many aspects of the film, Bhansali kept the theme of "misunderstanding between star-crossed lovers", while transposing them to another level. The idea of a feud between two families that destroys everything really appealed to him. According to Bhansali, "the whole execution of Shakespeare is more flirtatious and voluptuous" and he felt his film was the best interpretation of Romeo and Juliet. When asked about the extensive violence and guns in the film, he said that violence is "an integral part" of Romeo and Juliet, also stating how important it was for a filmmaker "to get out of his comfort zone".

The screenplay was written by writing duo Siddharth-Garima. Producer Sandip Singh offered the duo three films; they chose Ram-Leela over the other two. They were impressed by its outline and felt that it was similar to Australian writer Baz Luhrmann's films. In addition to writing, they collaborated with Bhansali for the costumes, recces, shoot days, editing, subtitling, and post production. After writing the initial screenplay draft, Siddarth-Garima were sent to Gujarat for researching dialect, slang and accent.

Rhyming couplets from Romeo and Juliet were translated into Hindi and used in the film, with more emphasis on innuendo and humour as they felt that the elements were "overshadowed" by tragedy in the original play.

=== Cast and characters ===
Pakistani actor Imran Abbas was the first choice for Ram, he rejected the role due to "contractual obligations". Bhansali offered the role to Sushant Singh Rajput, but he had to turn down the role over scheduling issues. Kareena Kapoor and Ranveer Singh were cast in the lead roles in the film. Singh later confirmed the news and conveyed his excitement on working with Kapoor. Bhansali was impressed with Singh's performance in Band Baaja Baaraat and cast him for the film. However, Kapoor walked out of the film 10 days before the shoot began and instead did Dharma Productions's romantic comedy Gori Tere Pyaar Mein. With already-complete sets and an approaching filming schedule, Bhansali approached Priyanka Chopra who agreed to do the film. Chopra was officially cast for Leela in July 2012 and was to start filming in August. However, before the filming started Bhansali brought Deepika Padukone in the film. After this unpleasant experience with Bhansali, Chopra stopped talking to Bhansali, as confirmed by the CEO of Bhansali Productions. In August 2012, Padukone had publicly expressed her desire to be a part of the film. After wrapping the filming of his previous film Lootera, Singh confirmed that he was signed on for the film in August 2012.

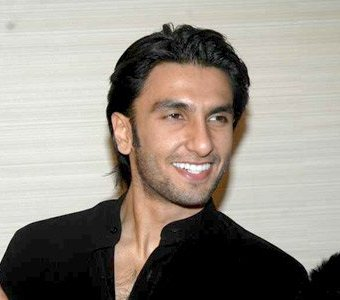
Singh was cast after Bhansali was impressed with his performance in Band Baaja Baaraat.

In an interview Bhansali revealed that he met Padukone with the script while she was ill; impressed with her beauty and watery eyes, he cast her. Richa Chadda was reportedly signed on to play a significant role, cast by Shruti Mahajan and Parag Mehta. Although she initially denied the claim, Chadda later agreed to play the role; she was not given the entire script until a month of filming. For Chadda's role, Bhansali wanted someone "with a dusky complexion and Indian features", hence she was selected. Bhansali ordered Chadda to watch Mirch Masala to prepare for her look, which was inspired by Smita Patil. Chadda also attempted to mimic Patil's acting. Barkha Bisht Sengupta, a television actress, plays a supporting role. Sengupta was asked by Bhansali to forget acting for her role. Gulshan Devaiah was reported to play the role of the antagonist Bhavani. Devaiah said that his character was from the Jadeja clan and has "enough shades of grey" and was "nothing" like he had done in his career at that point. Devaiah felt that other than the basic frame, Ram-Leela wasn't similar to Romeo and Juliet.

Singh, who plays a Gujarati boy, had to learn some Gujarati abuses as well as gain muscle for his character in the film. Singh enrolled for a 12-week transformation programme with Stevens, going on a strict protein diet which involved eating every 2 hours. He managed to get the required look in 6 weeks. He was put on a diet of fish, broccoli, turkey and green tea and was prevented from eating roti, rice or sweets. Singh said, "I had to work out one hour in the morning and one hour in the evening. I would work out at 5 in the morning, start shooting from 9, shoot for the entire day till 6 pm and then return to workout for an hour again." He felt that the fact he didn't consume alcohol more than once or twice a year helped him to achieve the result before the required date.

Padukone was shown wearing a 30 kg ghagra with a 50-metre 'ghera' in the first look of Ram-Leela. Padukone felt that the film was "tough" for her, stating that it was "mentally, physically, and emotionally demanding" for her. She attributes Bhansali's perfectionist outlook as the reason, while admitting she became emotional on the set. For the song Nagada Song Dhol, Padukone had to learn Garba. According to her, the Garba performed in the film was a folk one, rather than the commercial ones often played. Bhansali ordered Padukone and Singh to spend time together to develop their romantic chemistry. Padukone spent more than 12 hours a day for the workshop, which involved partying, watch films and attending premieres together with Singh. Since the two weren't familiar with each other, Bhansali wanted them to socialise.

There were rumours that Madhuri Dixit would be performing an item number for the film followed by speculation that Aishwarya Rai had been signed. Priyanka Chopra eventually featured in the song. She confirmed the news, saying that she "loved the song from the time [she] first heard it" and she "was challenged to push [her] boundaries." Chopra had to wear full sleeves to hide the muscles she had developed for playing Mary Kom

=== Production design ===
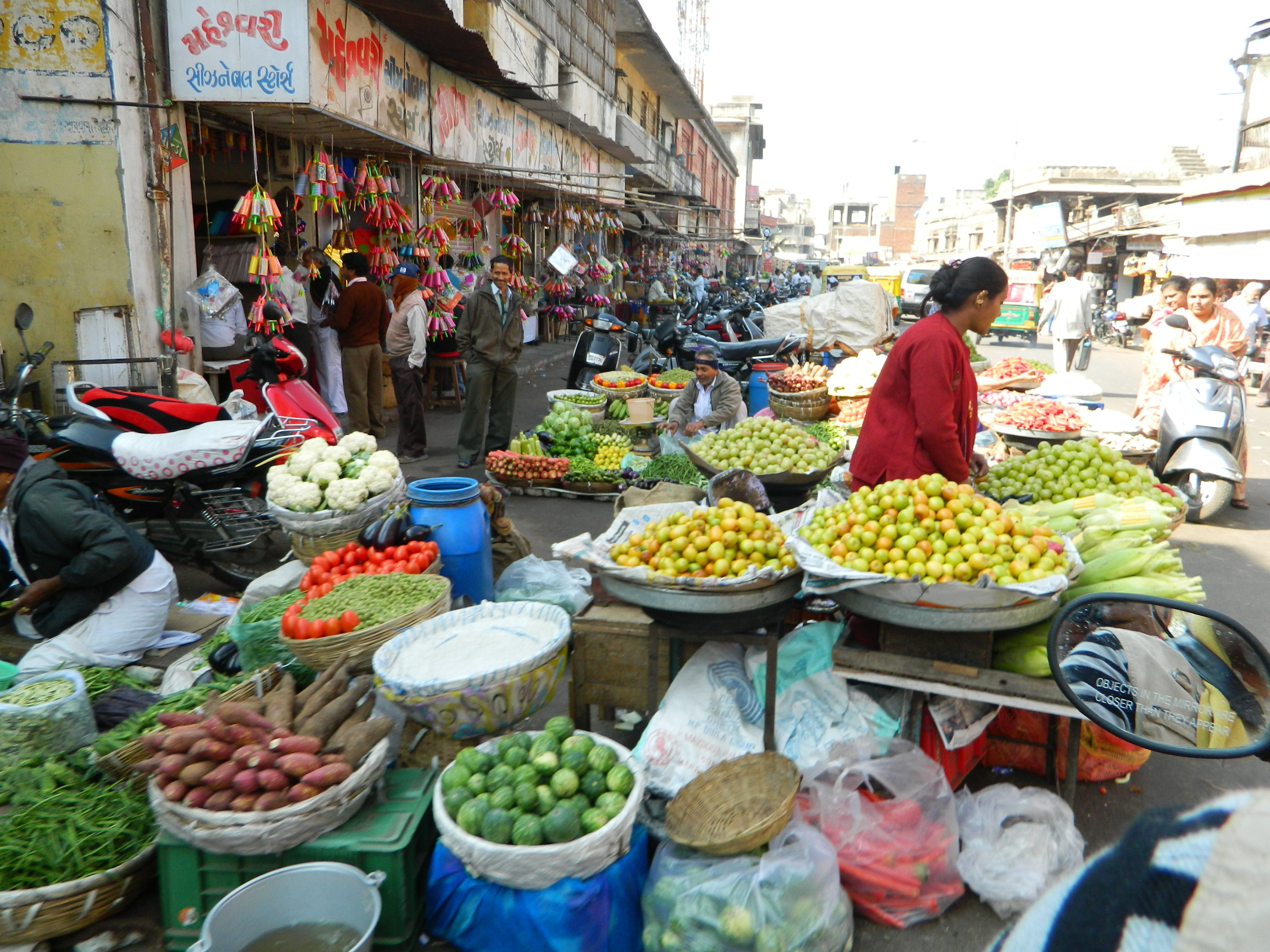
Sets were constructed to depict markets, which were inspired by those in Gujarat.

Wasiq Khan was the production designer for Ram-Leela. Khan finished working on Rowdy Rathore, a film produced by Bhansali, when he was called for Ram-Leela. According to Khan, Bhansali sometimes took 3 to 5 hours for one shot to achieve "perfection". Since Bhansali wanted to focus on Gujarat's architecture and royal havelis, the film was to be "grand and larger than life". He said that the challenge was to make the film both a romance and action film as the film would have a "rustic feel and texture" depicting action scenes, with many people fighting. Khan found it hard to maintain his realistic designs with Bhansali's "grand sets, big shots, and beautiful costumes". Ram-Leela's design and narrative were influenced by the "craft traditions and folk culture" of houses in the Kutch region of Gujarat.

Khan found the experience of creating sets for Ram-Leela "different" from his previous films. Bhansali and Khan spent about 2–3 months observing locations and discussed references and drawings. According to Khan, despite the decision to shoot half of the film on the sets and the other half in real locations, 90 per cent of the film ended up shot on sets due to difficulties to shoot action sequences in real locations. Some of the sets were created in Reliance and Film City. Interior sets were created at Reliance while an exterior set used to show the mohallas, streets and markets was set in Film City. Khan and Bhansali travelled through villages in Gujarat and got references from the lifestyle, costumes and markets, which were used for putting together the sets. The set of the porn film parlour operated by Ram in the film has "neon-lit cut-outs and lurid poster art". The storage area of weapons are made so that the guns poke out of "straw baskets and from inside shimmering back-lit glass cases". The chamber in which Leela and Ram exchange messages has paintings of Raja Ravi Varma hung with "diaphanous curtains". The walls are rough hued and lined with glasswork patches.

The film's costumes were designed by Anju Modi and Maxima Basu – Modi designed Padukone's clothes while Basu designed costumes for the rest of the cast. Designer Sabyasachi Mukherjee, who previously worked with Bhansali on Black, was hired initially for the costumes of the leading lady, but was later replaced by Anju Modi. Bhansali asked Basu to create a trial look; impressed with it, he chose the design for Singh's character Ram. Ram's look was inspired by Rabari tribesmen. Ram was a character who was "exposed to the world" yet resides in a village in Kutch, making his clothes have duality. According to Basu, "for every ripped jeans or boots he sports, you also see him flaunting a kediyu and kohl-rimmed eyes." The jeans worn by Singh in "Tattad Tattad" were personally worked on by Basu; she ripped the jeans and added the embellishments herself.

Modi journeyed to the Bhuj region of Kutch and bought pieces of antique textiles from the villagers; she had to "mix and match" it with new fabric to create singular outfits. This was done to make Padukone's outfit "as authentic as possible". Speaking about using the antique textiles, she said, "I wanted to use those old, antique fabrics because it's impossible to replicate the authenticity of those colors, the brocades and those beautiful, fine embroideries that were done by hand." The fabric from which the costume worn by Padukone in the song "Ishqyaun Dhishqyaun" was over 100 years old. Jewellery was taken from Amrapali Jewels, who lend their antique archives for shooting; these were not for sale. The dialogues of the film were written by Sr. Manager Sawan Vyas

After Modi was finalised as the costume designer, she was sent the script for studying the character of Leela. According to Modi, Leela's costumes changed as the film progressed: "the attire becomes more mature and darker and she’s shown in closed neck, long blouses." For the song 'Lahu Munh Lag Gaya', antique Kutch fabric was woven in the skirt worn by Padukone that showed through. For the promotional poster, Modi created a 30 kilo lehenga. Modi also designed Chopra's costume, speaking of the difference with Padukone's costume, she said, "Priyanka’s character is that of a mujrewali or courtesan... since the characteristics of a mujrewali are understood – they are sexy, desirable – the outfit I made for Priyanka was very fitted to the body but still had to look Gujarati."

=== Principal photography ===
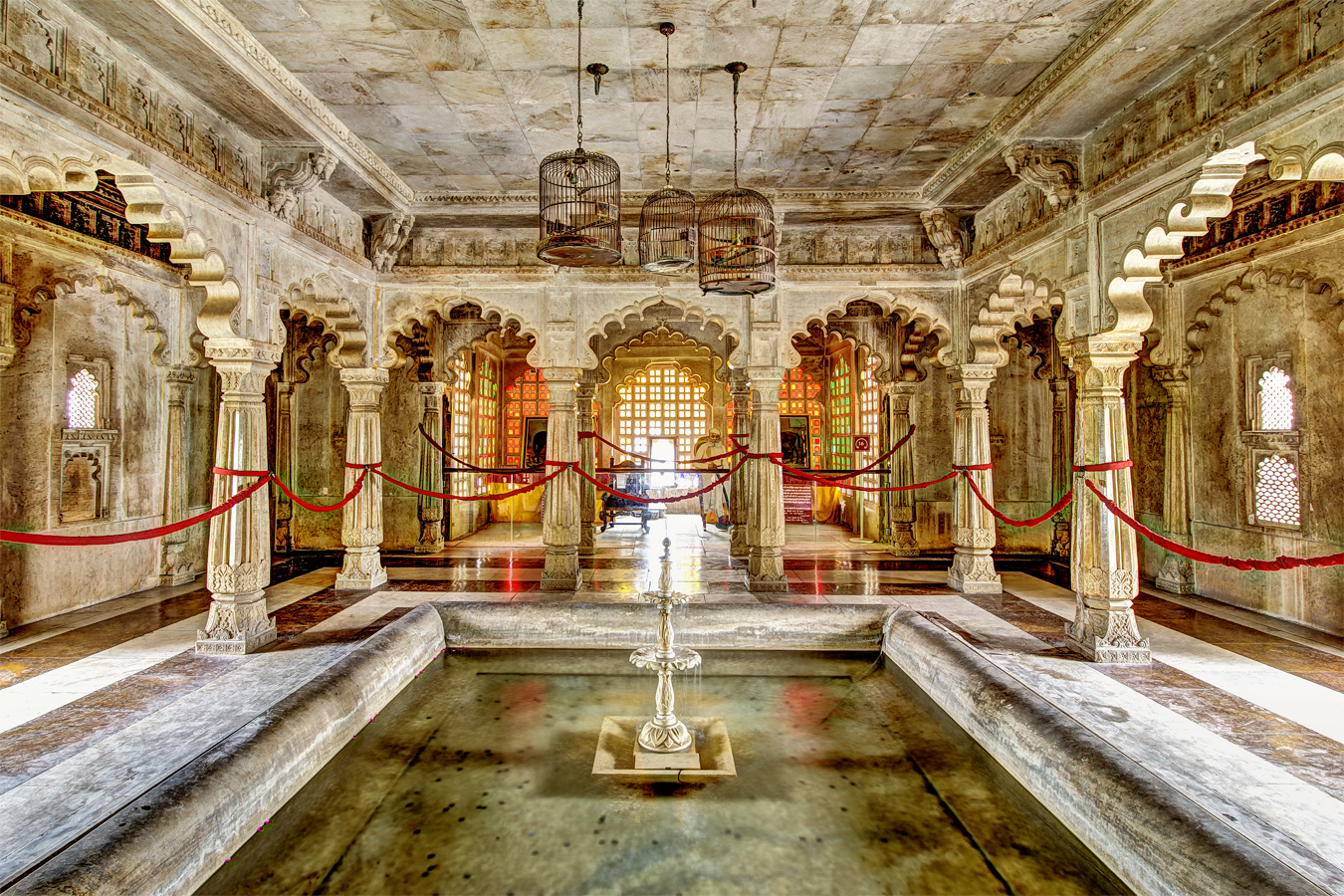
Parts of the film were shot at City Palace, Udaipur.

Initially shot in Gujarat, some sequences of Ram-Leela were shot in Udaipur, particularly at Udaipur palace and Gangaur Ghat where a song sequence was shot. The story of the film is set in Gujarat. In Udaipur, Singh shot a song sequence in freezing cold water for about 45 minutes. Padukone was injured on set; however she had to continue shooting as an expensive set was put up at Film City for the song "Nagada Sang Dhol." Sanjay Leela Bhansali had set up a gym on the sets in Filmcity Mumbai for the lead actor Ranveer Singh to not be late for the shooting and to avoid any delays for the movie. The budget of the film has been estimated to be between ₹350 million (US$3.7 million) and ₹850 million (US$9.1 million).

For the song 'Tattad Tattad', Singh had 30 trials for his costume, after which Bhansali suggested that he shoot shirtless. The classic balcony and conflict scenes were among those that were recreated from Romeo and Juliet. For a few boat sequences in the film, shooting took place at Lake Pichola. While shooting the song Ram Chahe Leela with Chopra, she rehearsed the Indian choreography within four days and completed her shoot. Singh shot Ram-Leela simultaneously with Gunday; due to an injury from shooting Gunday, Bhansali had to postpone the shoot of some scenes.

In February 2013, the cinematographer Ravi Varman injured himself on set and suffered a fracture on his hand, leading to shooting being postponed till April. When asked about why Ram-Leela was planned to be shot almost entirely in real locations and not sets, Bhansali said, "street rowdyism and gulli-mein-hungama, the desert and the lake" were elements present in the film. He contrasted the planned shooting with that of his previous venture Saawariya, which was entirely shot on sets constructed in a studio. Labelling outdoor shooting as "a big challenge" he added that shooting with different kinds of architecture was "interesting". He felt that putting the lead pair in a real space was "liberating" and that he reacted to spaces "very differently", while noting that parts of Hum Dil De Chuke Sanam and Guzaarish were shot on real locations. Despite the intent to shoot the film in real locations, most of the film was shot on sets due to difficulties.

== Soundtrack ==
The soundtrack album is composed by Sanjay Leela Bhansali, which is his second film after Guzaarish (2010), and lyrics were written by Siddharth–Garima. Monty Sharma composed the background score. The album features eleven songs, except one track "Mor Bani Thanghat Kare" is a 1944 Gujarati song translated by Jhaverchand Meghani and composed by Hemu Gadhavi. The remaining tracks were composed by Bhansali himself. The soundtrack album was released on 4 October 2013 after a delay due to Ranveer Singh's health issues.

== Marketing and release ==
The first teaser of the poster, featuring the lead actors standing on a cluster guns, was released in January 2013. The release date was revealed by Padukone on her Twitter account. On 16 September 2013, an official poster was released; the trailer launch took place on the same day. At the launch, a special rangoli poster of the film was created. Divya Goya of Indian Express writes, "The film promises to be high on drama and violence as this time 'Love is at War'." It also attracted praise from actor Amitabh Bachchan.

Some religious groups opposed the movie claiming that the former title Ramleela was misleading because the movie had nothing to do with Ramlila, traditional enactment of the life and story of Hindu deity, Lord Rama. A local court in Mumbai has issued an "ex-parte ad-interim stay" over the use of term Ramleela in the movie title. A Delhi court, on 12 November, stayed the release of the movie as per suit filed by six petitioners, including Prabhu Samaj Dharmik Ram Leela Committee, saying the movie hurt the religious sentiments of Hindus. The film's title was changed to Goliyon Ki Raasleela Ram-Leela, leading to the court lifting the stay order and the film releasing on the fixed date.

Ram-Leela released on 14 November 2013. The film got widest release 2000+ screens in domestic market and 550 screens in overseas and worldwide with around 2550 screens. Kshatriya community opposed usage of community names in the movie, so Jadeja and Rabari community titles were changed to Saneda and Rajadi. On 21 November 2013, Lucknow bench of Allahabad High Court banned the movie in Uttar Pradesh.

It also notably competed at the 2014 Pyongyang International Film Festival in North Korea in the main Best Film category.

== Reception ==
=== Critical reception ===
Ram-Leela received positive critical reviews. Taran Adarsh from Bollywood Hungama gave four and a half stars out of five, writing, "Goliyon Ki Raasleela ought to be watched for multiple reasons: the electrifying chemistry between its lead actors, the strong dramatic content, the scintillating musical score, the violent streak in the narrative and of course, Sanjay Leela Bhansali's execution of the material." Meena Iyer of The Times of India gave the movie 4 out of 5 stars, stating that the film has "nice doses of raunch and ras" and praised the performances of the cast and "precision" of certain scenes, while noting that the build up of romance could have been better. Writing for Firstpost, Mihir Fadnavis said, "The direction, outstanding production design, gorgeous cinematography are supported by a surprisingly strong cast, and Padukone is a wild-eyed anchor in a sea of formula. Three years ago you'd never have expected her to improve so drastically and command the kind of energy she does now."

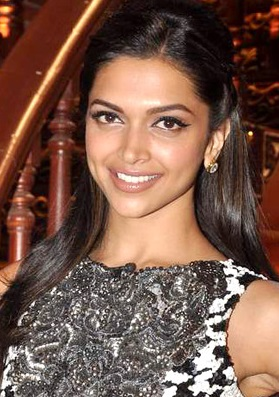
Padukone's performance was well received by critics

Shubha Shetty-Saha of Mid-Day gave four stars out of five and labelled the film "a must watch", praising the performances of Pathak, Padukone, Singh, Kelkar, Chaddha and Bisht but felt that Devaviah's talent "seems wasted". Writing for RogerEbert.com, Danny Bowes gave the film 3 out of 4 stars and praised Padukone's performance, writing, "It is Padukone, as is increasingly the case, who steals the show with pure, deliberate, ferocious star power. The striking thing about her performance as Leela is how tightly coiled and tense it seems; she's ready at a moment's notice to kiss or kill (or both), never passive, never merely a photographic subject." Rajeev Masand of CNN-IBN gave the film three and a half stars out of five and appreciated the chemistry between the lead pair, writing "Deepika and Ranveer scorch up the screen in their romantic scenes, their intense passion a bold change from Bollywood's mostly tame embraces", and called the film "far more engaging than the lazy blockbusters we've seen lately."

David Chute of Variety praised the dance numbers, writing, "The most effective sequences the two stars have together are the large-scale dance numbers, which are beautifully and imaginatively staged." Sarita Tanwar of DNA gave the movie 3.5 out of 5 stars and wrote "Ram Leela is a lovely mixture of the familiar and the fresh. The technical aspects of the film are extraordinary: breath-taking sets, spellbinding cinematography, perfect music and a wonderful supporting cast. Deepika is perfect in every scene. Ranveer has surrendered to the director's vision and delivers a power-packed performance." Gayatri Shankar of Zee News called the film "first-rate" and praised the visuals and performances of Singh and Padukone, labelling it "one of the finest performances of their careers." However, she found certain portions "a little hard to believe". Anupama Chopra of Hindustan Times gave the movie 3 out of 5 stars and writes: "Deepika has stolen the show from her heroes, but this one, I think, belongs to Ranveer. He’s flamboyant and cheerfully vulgar but also vulnerable and broken."

Shubhra Gupta of The Indian Express gave the movie 2.5 out of 5 stars, concluding "'Ram-Leela' creates a couple that ignites the screen, and most of the time when these two are on screen, you keep watching. It's when the guns come on, and the gun-masters start roaring and shouting, that the love-story drowns, and everything gets both too noisy and too choreographed." Writing for NDTV, Saibal Chatterjee gave the film two stars out of five and calls the film "all body and no soul." Raja Sen gave one star out of five and called the film "an overplotted, bloody mess", criticising the dialogues as "very poor... awful rhymes alternated with soap-operatic exposition". He criticised Singh's performance, while calling Padukone "something worth staring at".

On 8 November 2026, the Academy featured "Nagada Sang Dhol,' a song this movie, starring Deepika Padukone and Ranveer Singh, in a video posted on its official social media account.

=== Box office ===
Ram-Leela collected ₹1.52 billion in India and ₹ 491 million, for a total worldwide gross of ₹2.01 billion. As of February 2018, the film is the fifth highest grossing Indian film of 2015 in India, the sixth highest grossing Indian film of 2015 overseas, and the fifth highest grossing Indian film of 2015 worldwide.

Ram-Leela had a strong first day with collections of over ₹155 million (US$1.7 million) despite limited release due to controversies. The film grossed ₹165 million (US$1.8 million) on Saturday and ₹180 million (US$1.9 million) on Sunday to take its first weekend domestic total to ₹500 million (US$5.3 million), the third highest weekend of the year. The film's gross dropped on Monday to ₹77.5 million (US$830,000). The first week collections were about ₹740 million (US$7.9 million). The film remained steady in its second weekend with collections of ₹150 million (US$1.6 million), taking the ten-day gross to ₹890 million (US$9.5 million). Ram–Leela grossed around ₹970 million (US$10 million) in two weeks. The second week collections were around ₹230 million (US$2.5 million). The film earned ₹103 million (US$1.1 million) and ₹32.5 million (US$350,000) in its third week and fourth week respectively, taking its total to ₹1.1125 billion (US$12 million) and was commercially successful. The film ended with lifetime collections of ₹1.13 billion (US$12 million).

The movie collected US$450,000 (approximately ₹28.3 million) in North America on Friday, vis-à-vis US$311,000 (approximately ₹19.5 million) earned by Krrish 3. It also earned A$66,365 (approximately ₹3.91 million) in Australia in two days, beating A$58,283 (approximately ₹3.435 million) collected by the latter. In UAE-GCC, the movie opened with AED 1.3 million (approximately ₹22.2 million). It also collected £87,000 (approximately ₹8.826 million) in the UK on Friday, debuting at #9 in the chart and two days' collection in New Zealand stands at NZ$12,869 (₹673,000). The film's overseas figures were around the $4 million mark in the first weekend. The collections abroad are $7.25 million in seventeen days. Ram-Leela collected US$7.6 million overseas after its fourth weekend.

== Accolades ==
Filmfare Awards

- Winner, Best Actress : Deepika Padukone
- Winner, Best Supporting Actress : Supriya Pathak
- Winner, Best Choreography : Samir and Arsh Tanna – Lahu Muh Lag Gaya
- Nominated, Best Film : Goliyon Ki Raasleela Ram-Leela
- Nominated, Best Director : Sanjay Leela Bhansali
- Nominated, Best Actor : Ranveer Singh
- Nominated, Best Music Director : Sanjay Leela Bhansali
- Nominated, Best Female Playback Singer : Shreya Ghoshal – Nagada Sang Dhol

IIFA Awards

- Winner, Best Makeup : Vikram Gaikwad
- Winner, Best Art Direction : Wasiq Khan
- Nominated, Best Film : Goliyon Ki Raasleela Ram-Leela
- Nominated, Best Director : Sanjay Leela Bhansali
- Nominated, Best Actor : Ranveer Singh
- Nominated, Best Actress: Deepika Padukone
- Nominated, Best Actress in Supporting Role: Richa Chadda
- Nominated, Best Performance in a Negative Role: Supriya Pathak
- Nominated, Best Female Playback Singer: Bhoomi Trivedi – "Ram Chahe Leela"

Screen Awards

- Winner, Screen Award for Best Actress : Deepika Padukone
- Winner, Most Popular Actress Female : Deepika Padukone (also includes her work in Chennai Express and Yeh Jawaani Hai Deewani)
- Winner, Best Costume Design : Anju Modi and Maxima Basu
- Winner, Best Production Design : Wasiq Khan
- Winner, Best Cinematography : S. Ravi Varman
- Nominated, Best Film : Bhansali Productions
- Nominated, Best Director : Sanjay Leela Bhansali
- Nominated, Screen Award for Best Supporting Actress : Richa Chadda
- Nominated, Screen Award for Best Actor (Popular Choice) : Ranveer Singh
- Nominated, Best Actor in a Negative Role (Female): Supriya Pathak
- Nominated, Best Choreography : Sameer and Arsh Tanna – Nagada Sang Dhol

Apsara Film & Television Producers Guild Awards

- Winner, Apsara Award for Best Art Direction : Rashid Khan
- Winner, Apsara Award for Best Singer – Female : Bhoomi Trivedi " Ram Chahe Leela"
- Winner, Apsara Award for Best Costume Design : Maxima Basu & Anju Modi
- Winner, Apsara Award for Best Performance in a Negative Role : Supriya Pathak
- Nominated, Apsara Award for Best Director : Sanjay Leela Bhansali
- Nominated, Apsara Award for Best Actor in a Leading Role: Ranveer Singh
- Nominated, Apsara Award for Best Actress in a Leading Role: Deepika Padukone
- Nominated, Apsara Award for Best Film :
- Nominated, Apsara Award for Best Screenplay : Siddharth-Garima & Sanjay Leela Bhansali
- Nominated, Apsara Award for Best Dialogue : Siddharth- Garima
- Nominated, Apsara Award for Best Choreography : Vishnu Deva – "Ishqyaun Dhishqyuan" & "Ram Chahe Leela"
- Nominated, Apsara Award for Best Music : Sanjay Leela Bhansali
- Nominated, Apsara Award for Best Singer – Male : Aditya Narayan- Tattad Tattad & Ishqyaun Dhishqyuan
- Nominated, Apsara Award for Best Actress in a Supporting Role : Richa Chadda

BIG Star Entertainment Awards

- Winner, Best Action Film : Sanjay Leela Bhansali
- Winner, Most Entertaining Singer Female : Bhoomi Trivedi-Ram Chahe Leela
- Winner, Most Entertaining Music : Sanjay Leela Bhansali
- Nominated, Most Entertaining Director : Sanjay Leela Bhansali
- Nominated, Most Entertaining Film of the Year 2013 – Sanjay Leela Bhansali
- Nominated, Most Entertaining Actor in a Romantic Film – Male : Ranveer Singh
- Nominated, Most Entertaining Actor in a Romantic Film – Female : Deepika Padukone
- Nominated, Most Entertaining Actor (Film) – Female : Deepika Padukone
- Nominated, Most Entertaining Actor (Film) – Male : Ranveer Singh
- Nominated, Most Entertaining Dancer (Male & Female)- Deepika Padukone : "Nagada Sang Dhol" and Priyanka Chopra : "Ram Chahe Leela"
- Nominated, Most Entertaining Singer Female – Shreya Ghoshal : "Nagada Sang Dhol"
- Nominated, Most Entertaining Singer Male – Aditya Narayan : "Tattad Tattad"
- Nominated, Most Entertaining Song – "Nagada Sang Dhol"

Zee Cine Awards

- Winner, Best Actor in a Negative Role : Supriya Pathak
- Nominated, Best Film : Sanjay Leela Bhansali
- Nominated, Best Actor – Male : Ranveer Singh
- Nominated, Best Actor – Female : Deepika Padukone
- Nominated, Best Playback Singer – Female : Bhoomi Trivedi – Ram Chahe Leela

Lions Gold Awards

- Winner, Best Male Actor : Ranveer Singh

Mirchi Music Awards

- Winner, Upcoming Female Vocalist of The Year : Bhoomi Trivedi – "Ram Chahe Leela"
- Winner, Upcoming Lyricist of The Year : Siddharth-Garima – "Laal Ishq"
