= Shail Hada =

- Born: 11 April 1975 (age 51); Kota, Rajasthan, India
- Occupations: Playback singer, Music Director
- Instrument: Vocalist
- Years active: 2003 – present

Shail Hada (born 11 April 1975) is an Indian playback singer born and brought up in Rajasthan.

== Early life ==
Shail trained in Hindustani Classical music from renowned vocalist and his father Shri Jaswant Singh Hada. He studied in St. Paul's Mala Road, Kota. Later, he went on do his M.A. in Music from University of Kota and Sangeet Visharad from Gandharava Mahavidyalya under the guidance of his guru Pundit Aaskaran Sharma. After coming to Mumbai, he joined the department of music at Mumbai University where he won six gold medals at various national competitions.

== Career ==
Shail began his career by singing background vocals for Sanjay Leela Bhansali’s Black. Since then he has collaborated with Bhansali in every film that he has directed. He got more fame because of his music in Bhansali's next directorial Saawariya which went on to become among the best musical albums of 2007. In this same movie, Shail worked as an assistant to the composer Monty Sharma. The Saawariya album gave the music industry a new voice that had the capability to hit the high notes and as well do the yodeling.

Shail worked as the chief assistant music director in Guzaarish. He arranged the tracks Udi and Maza Saiba and sang other tracks including the title track with KK and Udi with Sunidhi Chauhan.

Shail won Stardust Award in the New Sensation Male category in 2011 for the song Tera Zikr Hain in the film Guzaarish.

Shail has also ventured into the South Indian music industries, particularly Tamil and Telugu in Harris Jayaraj's compositions.

In 2011, Shail Hada was one of the singers in Laxmikant–Pyarelal's concert "Maestros" which was organized by Kakas Entertainment in India.

== Discography ==
Year	Song title	Film title	Language	Music director
2022	"Dholida"	Gangubai Kathiawadi	Hindi	Sanjay Leela Bhansali
2019	"Ek Malaal"	Malaal	Hindi	Sanjay Leela Bhansali
2018	"Khalibali", "Holi"	Padmaavat	Hindi	Sanjay Leela Bhansali
2018	""Dil Jo Na Keh Saka", "Bandh Khwabon Ki" and "Khwabon Ko Ankhon Mein"	Dil Jo Na Keh Saka	Hindi	Shail Hada, Pritesh Mehta
2017	"Jagdamb"	Manjha	Marathi	Shail Hada
2016	"Mera Junoon","Sarbjit Theme","Barsan Laagi","Tung Lak","Meherbaan"	Sarbjit	Hindi	Jeet Gannguli, Amaal Mallik, Shail-Pritesh, Shashi Shivam
2015	"Martand Malhari","Sobane Soyanire","Mann Jaai Jitha"	Carry On Maratha	Marathi	Shail Hada & Pritesh
2014	"You Only Live Once"	Anegan	Tamil	Harris Jayaraj
2013	"Lahu Muh Lag Gaya", "Poore Chand Ki Ye" "Ang Laga De"	Goliyon Ki Raasleela Ram-Leela	Hindi	Assist. Music Director
2012	"Har Har Mahadev", "Mayad Tharo wo Put Kathe"	Maharana Pratap: The First Freedom Fighter	Hindi	Dr. Prem Bhandari
2012	"Jeet Lenge Jahan Ek Din"	Jeet Lenge Jahan	Hindi	Raja Pandit
2011	"Mar Jana Soniye", "Mess It Up"	Mumbai Mast Kallander	Hindi	Afsar - Sajid
2011	"Tumse Milke"	Milta Hai Chance By Chance	Hindi	Afsar - Sajid
2011	"Dawat"	Memories in March	Hindi	Debojyoti Mishra
2011	"Main Ek Bhanwra"	Saheb Biwi Aur Gangster	Hindi	Amit Sial
2010	"Dhatad Thatad"	Lafangey Parindey	Hindi	R. Anandh
2010	"Tera Zikr Hai", "Guzaarish", "Saiba", "Udi", "Keh Na Saku"	Guzaarish	Hindi	Assist. Music Director
2010	"Rooba Rooba"	Orange	Telugu	Harris Jayaraj
2009	"Yeno Yeno"	Aadhavan	Tamil	Harris Jayaraj
2009	"Tiledhar Dupatta"	Right Ya Wrong	Hindi	Monty Sharma
2009	"Kubool"	Vaada Raha	Hindi	Monty Sharma
2008	"Dukh Ke Badri", "Aaja Milke"	Chamku	Hindi	Monty Sharma
2008	"Wat's Up Bro" (Slow), "Gurbani","Badmash Launde" (Blasted),"Badmash Launde"	Heroes	Hindi	Monty Sharma
2007	"Saawariya", "Saawariya Reprise"	Saawariya	Hindi	Monty Sharma
