= Global Indian Music Academy Awards =

Award

GiMA Awards
- Awarded for: Excellence in cinematic achievements
- Country: India
- Presented by: Global Indian Music Academy
- First award: 2010
- Website: gima.co.in

The Global Indian Music Academy Awards (also known as the GiMA Awards) are presented annually by Global Indian Music Academy to honour and recognise Indian music. The nominees are voted by GiMA's jury, who have some of the most respected artistes in the country. Global Indian Music Academy Awards honor both film and non-film music in separate categories.

The awards ceremony was first televised in 2010 and has been presented annually ever since, except for 2013. In 2013, nominees for the awards were announced though no ceremony was held to honor the winners. The 4th GiMA Awards ceremony was held on 20 January 2014 at National Sports Club of India Stadium.

== History ==
The 1st edition of Global Indian Music Academy Awards was held on 10 November 2010 at Yash Raj Studios in Andheri. In its first edition, Asha Bhosle presented the Lifetime Achievement Award to her sister Lata Mangeshkar. The show was hosted by Sajid Khan, Shreyas Talpade and Dia Mirza. A total of 29 awards under Film and non-film categories were presented. The 2nd Chevrolet Global Indian Music Academy Awards was held on 30 October 2011 in Gurgaon which was hosted by Ranveer Singh and Neha Dhupia. With a total of 31 awards, the edition introduced a new category of Pop-Rock Single.

The 3rd edition of the award ceremonies held on 1 October 2012, was hosted by Parineeti Chopra and Saif Ali Khan at Yash Raj Studios, Mumbai. No winners were announced for 4th edition of Global Indian Music Academy Awards which was supposedly be held in 2013, though nominations were announced for the categories. 4th GiMA Awards was hosted by actor Ranveer Singh who earlier hosted along with Dhupia. The show was held at National Sports Club of India Stadium on 20 January 2014.

== Award Ceremonies ==
Ceremony	Date	Venue	Host(s)
1st GiMA Awards	10 November 2010	Yash Raj Studios	Sajid Khan, Shreyas Talpade, Dia Mirza & Parineeti Chopra
2nd GiMA Awards	30 October 2011	Gurgaon	Ranveer Singh, Neha Dhupia & Salman Khan
3rd GiMA Awards	1 October 2012	Yash Raj Studios	Parineeti Chopra, Saif Ali Khan
4th GiMA Awards	20 January 2014	National Sports Club of India Stadium	Ranveer Singh
5th GiMA Awards	24 February 2015	Film City, Mumbai	Mika Singh
6th GiMA Awards	6 April 2016	Film City, Mumbai	Ayushmann Khurrana

== Awards ==
=== Film Music awards ===
- Best Music Arranger and Programmer
- Best Engineer – Film Album
- Best Engineer – Theatre Mix (Category removed after 2011)
- Best Background Score
- Best Music Director
- Best Music Debut
- Best Female Playback Singer
- Best Male Playback Singer
- Best Duo/Group Song (Category started from 2016)
- Best Duet
- Best Lyricist
- Best Film Song
- Best Film Album

=== Non-Film Music awards ===
- Best Music Debut
- Best Non-Film Song
- Best Fusion Album
- Best Devotional Album
- Best Hindustani Classical Album – Vocal
- Best Hindustani Classical Album – Instrumental
- Best Pop Album
- Best Rock Album
- Best Ghazal Album
- Best Folk Album
- Best Carnatic Classical Album – Vocal
- Best Carnatic Classical Album – Instrumental
- Best Semi-Classical Album (Category removed after 2011)
- Best Popular Music Album (Category removed after 2011)

== Records and facts ==
Most awards to a single film

- Aashiqui 2 (2013) = 6/13
- Dabangg (2010) = 6/12
- Rockstar (2011) = 6/11

Most composing awards (Best Music Arranger and Programmer + Best Background Score + Best Music Director)

- Shankar–Ehsaan–Loy (1+2+0)/(4+4+3) = 3/11
- A. R. Rahman (0+1+1)/(2+4+2) = 2/8
- Amit Trivedi (1+0+1)/(1+2+2) = 2/5

Most playback singer – female (Best Female Playback Singer + Best Duet)

- Shreya Ghoshal (2+1)/(7+5) = 3/12
- Sunidhi Chauhan (1+0)/(6+1) = 1/7

Most playback singer – male (Best Male Playback Singer + Best Duet)

- Arijit Singh (2+2)/(7+3) = 4/10
- Mohit Chauhan (2+0)/(5+0) = 2/5
