= BIG Star Entertainment Awards =

Award

Big STAR Entertainment Awards
- Awarded for: India's leading 'People's Award'
- Country: India
- Presented by: Reliance Broadcast Network Limited
- First award: 2010
- Final award: 2015
- Website: http://927bigfm.com/bigfm/

The Big STAR Entertainment Awards was an annual award show presented by Reliance Broadcast Network Limited in association with STAR India to honour personalities from the field of entertainment across movies, music, television, sports, theatre and dance. The award is touted to be a completely viewer driven award wherein audience participation from nominations to the selection of final winners through SMS and online voting across the categories is used for deciding the winners. The award was announced on 12 December 2010 and the first ever nominations for 2010 Awards were published online through various entertainment websites on 15 December. The last award ceremony happened in 2015.

== History ==
The awards were conceptualised by Reliance Broadcast Network Limited's marketing arm, Big Live. The first ever Big Star Entertainment Awards was held on 21 December 2010 at Bhavan's Grounds in Mumbai. The Awards were given immense promotion through various media outlets like Reliance Broadcast Network's verticals like 92.7 BIG FM, Big Street, Big Live and Big Digital.

The awards were launched in a public ceremony with Arshad Warzi unveiling the statuette of Big Star Entertainment Awards. Reliance Broadcast Network CEO Tarun Katial said, "We are very proud to announce the Big Star Entertainment Awards, an award with a high degree of consumer centricity and representing all Entertainment genres Indian’s love." He added the aim of the award was to celebrate entertainment the way audiences consume and enjoy it. Through this award, the audience are empowered to decide who their favourite entertainers are. He said "Delivered through engaging ideas and multiple touch points, this is a truly integrated property that is bound to create unprecedented impact, in its first year itself."

Star India COO Sanjay Gupta said, "The Big Star Entertainment Awards will witness the coming together of Star India and Reliance Broadcast Network, two of India’s biggest media companies, with complementary capabilities. Star India is the leading television network in the country reaching more than 400 million viewers weekly; and together we are all set to create superlative entertainment reaching out to our viewers across all platforms." He added, "Today, almost 50 per cent of TV viewing happens in the entertainment space and December 31 night is a time when television viewing actually increases manifold because people are willing to sit together and watch TV. Therefore, we are sure that the property will pull in good eyeballs." Price Waterhouse Coopers were the auditors for the first award ceremony held in 2010.

== Awards ==
There were 21 categories in the 2010 Big Star Entertainment Awards. These included 8 categories for the mainstream Hindi films, 4 for the Hindi television programmes and a set of 9 awards which honoured the best shows and personalities of the 2000–2010 Decade.

=== Film Awards ===
- BIG Star Most Entertaining Film Actor – Male
- BIG Star Most Entertaining Film Actor – Female
- BIG Star Most Entertaining Director
- BIG Star Most Entertaining Film
- BIG Star Most Entertaining Song
- BIG Star Most Entertaining Music
- BIG Star Most Entertaining Singer (Male)
- BIG Star Most Entertaining Singer (Female)
- BIG Star Most Entertaining Actor in a Romantic Role – Male
- BIG Star Most Entertaining Actor in a Romantic Role – Female
- BIG Star Most Entertaining Actor in a Social Role – Male
- BIG Star Most Entertaining Actor in a Social Role – Female
- BIG Star Most Entertaining Actor in an Action Role
- BIG Star Most Entertaining Actor in a Comic Role

=== Television Awards ===
- BIG Star Most Entertaining Television Fiction Show
- BIG Star Most Entertaining Television Reality Show
- BIG Star Most Entertaining Television Actor - Male
- BIG Star Most Entertaining Television Actor - Female
- BIG Star Most Entertaining Television Dancer

=== Sports Awards ===
- BIG Star Most Entertaining Sports Person

=== BIG Star Decade Honors ===
- BIG Star Film Actor (Male) of the Decade
- BIG Star Film Actor (Female) of the Decade
- BIG Star Director of the Decade
- BIG Star Film of the Decade
- BIG Star Music / Lyrics of the Decade
- BIG Star Singer of the Decade
- New Talent of the Decade (Male)
- New Talent of the Decade (Female)
- BIG Star TV Show of the Decade (Fiction)
- BIG Star TV Show of the Decade (Non-Fiction)
- BIG Star Personality of the Decade
- BIG Star Complete Entertainer of The Decade
- BIG Star Entertainer for 50 Years of Excellence in Film Industry

== See also ==
- List of Asian television awards
