= Salim Khan family =

Indian film family

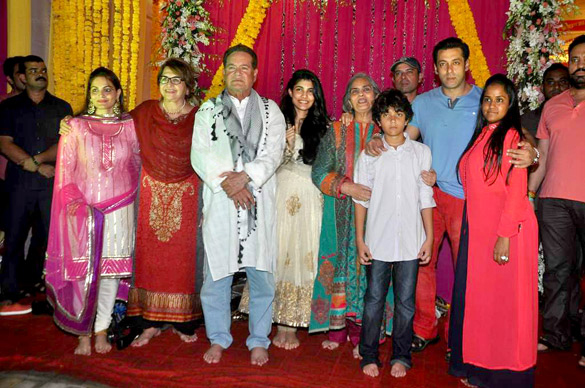
- Members of the Khan family at an event in 2015
- Current region: Mumbai, Maharashtra, India
- Members: Salman Khan; Arbaaz Khan; Sohail Khan; Helen Richardson Khan; Arpita Khan; Atul Agnihotri; Alvira Khan Agnihotri; Aayush Sharma; Alizeh Agnihotri
- Traditions: Hinduism; Islam; Christianity
- Estates: Galaxy Apartments; Bandra, Mumbai, Maharashtra, India; Arpita Farms, Panvel
- Active since 1959, for nearly 67 years.

The Salim Khan family refers to the family of Salim Khan which is a prominent Indian show business family, and is one of the prominent Bollywood film clans. Multiple members of the family have been actors, screenwriters, film directors and producers in the Hindi film industry of India. Salim, one half of the duo Salim–Javed, is one of the most famous screenwriters in the history of Indian cinema. His son, actor Salman Khan, has been the prominent face of the family since the 1990s, as one of the biggest Bollywood movie stars in history of Indian cinema.

Salim was born in 1935 in Indore in the Central Provinces and Berar in British India. His father was an immigrant from Afghanistan who migrated and settled in Indore (now in Madhya Pradesh). The family also has roots in Jammu and Kashmir, from the father of Salma Khan (born Sushila Charak), Salim's first wife. Some members of the family also have roots in Kerala (ex-wife of Arbaaz Khan Malaika Arora through her maternal side), Punjab (Atul Agnihotri, Seema Sachdev and Malaika Arora through her paternal side) and Burma (Helen).

== Generations ==
=== First generation ===
- Anwar Khan, Father of Abdul Rashid Khan, Grandfather of Salim Khan. He was a Alakozai Pashtun who migrated from Afghanistan to India in the mid-1800s and served in the cavalry of the British Indian Army.

=== Second generation ===
- Abdul Rashid Khan (died 1950), Father of Salim Khan. He was a DIG in Indian Imperial Police in Indore
- Siddiqa Bano Khan, Mother of Salim Khan

=== Third generation ===
- Salim Khan (born 1935), Indian actor and screenwriter
- Sushila Charak (Salma Khan) (born 8 December 1942), first wife of Salim Khan, father from Jammu and Kashmir and mother from Maharashtra
- Helen Richardson Khan (born Helen Richardson, 1938), second wife of Salim Khan, actress and dancer

=== Fourth generation ===
- Salman Khan (born Abdul Rashid Salim Salman Khan, 1965), Indian actor, producer, television presenter, philanthropist and humanitarian.
- Arbaaz Khan (born 1967), Indian actor, director and film producer, married to Shura Khan
- Alvira Khan Agnihotri, film producer and fashion designer, daughter of Salim and Salma, married to Atul Agnihotri
- Sohail Khan (born 1969), Indian film actor, director and producer
- Arpita Khan Sharma, adopted daughter of Salim Khan, married to Aayush Sharma

=== Fifth generation ===
- Alizeh Agnihotri, daughter of Alvira and Atul
- Ayaan Agnihotri, son of Alvira and Atul
- Arhaan Khan, son of Arbaaz and Malaika Arora
- Sipaara Khan, daughter of Arbaaz Khan and Sshura Khan
- Nirvan Khan, son of Sohail and Seema
- Yohan Khan, son of Sohail and Seema
- Ahil Sharma, son of Arpita and Aayush
- Ayat Sharma, daughter of Arpita and Aayush

== Contributions ==
=== Salim Khan ===
Salim Khan is a screenwriter, who wrote the screenplays, stories and scripts for numerous Bollywood films. In Hindi cinema, Khan is best known for being one half of the prolific screenwriting duo Salim–Javed, along with Javed Akhtar. The duo Salim-Javed were the first Indian screenwriters to achieve star status, becoming the most successful Indian screenwriters of all time.

Salim-Javed revolutionised Indian cinema in the 1970s, transforming and reinventing the Bollywood formula, pioneering the Bollywood blockbuster format, and pioneering genres such as the masala film and the Dacoit Western. Salim Khan was also responsible for creating the "angry young man" character archetype and launching Amitabh Bachchan's career. Salim-Javed won six Filmfare Awards, and their films are among the highest-grossing Indian films of all time, including Sholay (1975), the highest-grossing Indian film ever at the time, as well as films such as Seeta Aur Geeta (1972), Zanjeer (1973), Deewaar (1975), Kranti (1981), and the Don franchise.

=== Salman Khan ===
Ever since the blockbuster Maine Pyar Kiya (1989), has been known for being one of the three biggest movie stars of Bollywood since the 1990s, along with Aamir Khan and Shah Rukh Khan, collectively known as the three Khans of Bollywood. He is often known for starring in blockbuster masala films, a genre that was originally pioneered by his father Salim Khan.

=== Arbaaz Khan ===
Arbaaz Khan, ever since the blockbuster Daraar (1996). He is often known for starring in blockbuster masala films, a genre that was originally pioneered by his father Salim Khan. He is known for his films Jai Ho (2014), Pyaar Kiya To Darna Kya (1998), and Hello Brother (1999).

=== Sohail Khan ===
Sohail Khan, the youngest of the Khan brothers, produces films under his banner Sohail Khan Productions. He has appeared on the TV show Comedy Circus as one of the judges.

=== Alvira Khan ===
Alivra Khan Agnihotri, the sister of the khan brothers, film producer and fashion designer. She is a producer of blockbuster films like Hello (2008), Bodyguard (2011), and Bharat (2019).

== See also ==
- List of Hindi film clans
