= Lavale =

Lavale may refer to:

- Lavale, Pune in Maharashtra, India
- Lavale Thomas (born 1963), American football running back
- Russ Lavale (born 1974), Australian Olympic table tennis player
- Los Angeles Vale F.C.
