= Khans of Bollywood =

Bollywood actors with the surname Khan

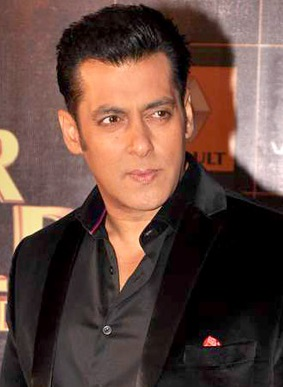
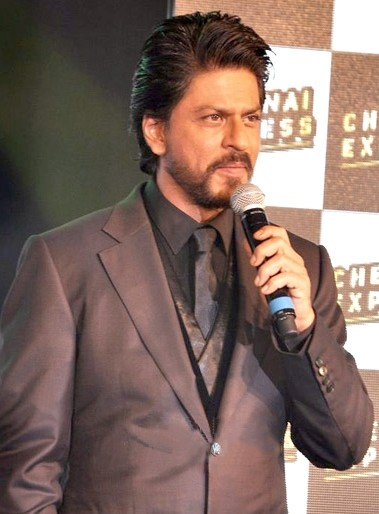
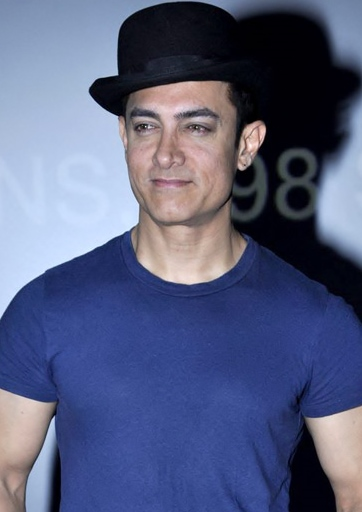
Salman Khan (left), Shah Rukh Khan (middle), and Aamir Khan (right)

The term Khans of Bollywood refers to several actors of Bollywood, the Mumbai-based Hindi language Indian film industry, whose surnames are Khan. Most commonly, this involves the Three Khans: Shah Rukh Khan, Salman Khan and Aamir Khan. The three are unrelated, but happen to share the same surname, and were all born in 1965. Due to their longevity and high popularity, they are considered among the most successful movie stars in the history of Indian cinema.

The dominance of the three Khans at the Indian box office has been compared to that of the Marvel Cinematic Universe in Hollywood. Shah Rukh Khan frequently appears among the top three wealthiest actors in the world, while Aamir Khan has been the only Eastern actor to be ranked first in the world's highest-earning actors in films, and Salman Khan has been the highest paid celebrity in South Asia several times. They have also earned critical acclaim, between them winning 6 National Film Awards and 26 Filmfare Awards. They are some of the most famous Indians known overseas, and some of the world's biggest movie stars. They have been reported by various sources to command high salary packages up to ₹50 crore (US$8.53 million) per movie. The three Khans have had successful careers since the late 1980s, and have dominated the Indian box office since the 1990s, across three decades.

Combined, they have starred in seven of the top ten highest-grossing Bollywood films ever, four out of ten highest-grossing Indian films, and nearly every annual top-grossing Bollywood film between 1989 and 2017 (except for 1992–1993). They officially created the 100 Crore Club: the first films to gross ₹100 crore domestically was Salman's Hum Aapke Hain Koun (1994) and Aamir Khan's Ghajini (2008) was the first to net ₹100 crore. Aamir's Dangal (2016) created the Bollywood 1000 Crore Club, owing to its overseas success in Chinese markets, and eventually created the 2000 Crore Club, becoming the highest-grossing Indian film ever (worldwide and overseas), and one of the highest-grossing films in China and India, with his earnings from the film estimated to be ₹300 crore (US$46.07 million), the highest payday for a non-Hollywood actor. In 2014, Shah Rukh was the richest non-Hollywood actor and the richest actor in highest-paid the world, with an estimated net worth of US$290 million. On the 2016 Forbes list of the 10 actors in the world, Salman ranked sixth, with total earnings of US$33.5 million for the year. On 2017's and 2018's Forbes list of the ten highest-paid actors in the world, Salman Khan ranked ninth both years, earning $37 million and $38.5 million in 2017 and 2018.

In addition to the three Khans, there have been other Khans in Bollywood. The most famous Khan prior to them was Dilip Kumar, whose real name is Muhammad Yusuf Khan, for which he has been referred to as the "First Khan" of Bollywood. Kumar was the biggest Indian star of the 1950s and 1960s, a matinee idol and the country's highest paid actor of the period. His 1960 film Mughal-e-Azam was the first Indian film with an adjusted gross over ₹2000 crore, making it the highest-grossing Indian film for over six decades. The term "fourth Khan" is used to refer to Saif Ali Khan.

== Three Khans ==
=== Salman Khan ===
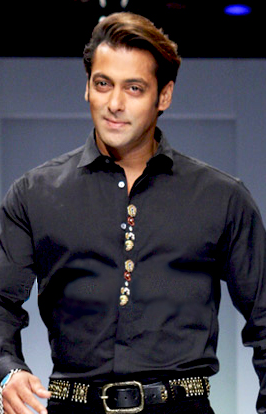
Salman Khan ramp walking in 2009. He has been the most domestically successful Indian actor.

Abdul Rashid Salim Salman Khan (born 27 December 1965), better known as Salman Khan (pronunciation: [səlˈmaːn xaːn];) is one of the biggest and among the most economically viable actors of India. In the 2010s, every movie he acted in as the main lead commanded over 100 crores. Referred to in the media as "The Tiger of Bollywood", he is popularly called "Bhai"/"Bhaijaan" by his fans. He has a significant following in Asia. He is cited in the media as one of the most popular, influential and commercially successful actors of Hindi cinema.

Khan began his acting career with a supporting role in Biwi Ho To Aisi (1988) and achieved a breakthrough with a leading role in his next release — Sooraj Barjatya's romance Maine Pyar Kiya (1989). Khan went on to establish himself in Bollywood in the 1990s with roles in several top-grossing productions, including the romantic drama Hum Aapke Hain Koun..! (1994), the action thriller Karan Arjun (1995), the comedy Biwi No.1 (1999), and the family drama Hum Saath-Saath Hain (1999). For his role in Karan Johar's romantic drama Kuch Kuch Hota Hai (1998), Khan was awarded the Filmfare Award for Best Supporting Actor. He later starred in the critically acclaimed movie Tere Naam (2003). After a brief period of decline in the 2000s, Khan achieved greater stardom in the 2010s by playing the lead role in several successful action films, including Dabangg (2010), Bodyguard (2011), Ek Tha Tiger (2012), Kick (2014), Bajrangi Bhaijaan (2015), Sultan (2016), and Tiger Zinda Hai (2017). By 2012, ten of the films he had starred in had accumulated gross earnings of over ₹1 billion (US$18.71 million), and he has starred in the highest-grossing Bollywood films of nine separate years which is a Bollywood record. For his contributions to film, the Government of India honored him with the 2008 Rajiv Gandhi Award for Outstanding Achievement in Entertainment. In 2018, Salman Khan was ranked seventh in Forbes's first global list of the highest-paid actor in the world with US$37.7 million.

=== Shah Rukh Khan ===
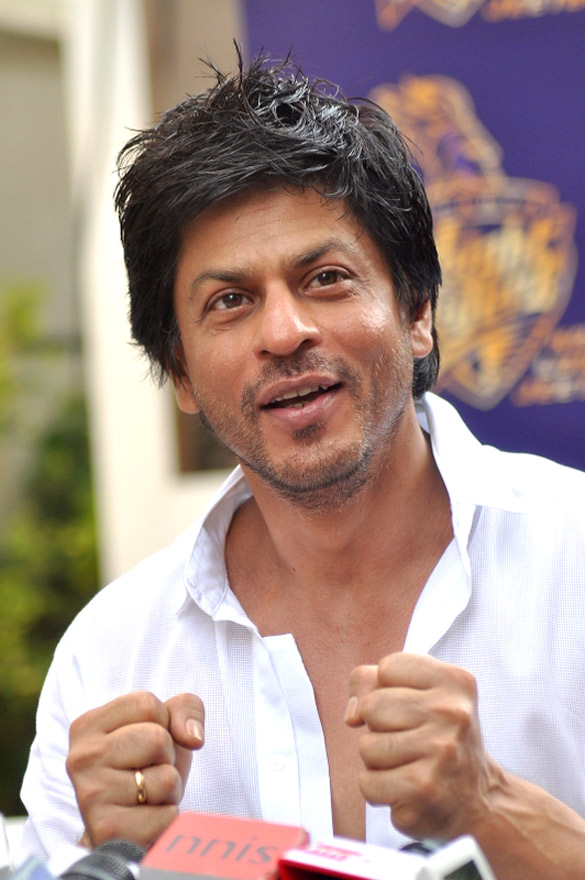
Shah Rukh Khan in 2012. One of the richest actors globally, he is often considered as the biggest movie star in the world.

Shah Rukh Khan (born Shahrukh Khan, 2 November 1965), popularly called as SRK, is sometimes referred to in the media as the "King of Bollywood" and "King Khan". He has appeared in several successful romantic films including Darr, Dilwale Dulhania Le Jayenge, Dil to Pagal Hai, Kuch Kuch Hota Hai and Veer Zaara among others. He is also a recipient of eight Filmfare Awards for Best Actor (tied with the legendary Dilip Kumar) and won a total of 14 Filmfare Awards. He has appeared in more than 80 films. Described by the Los Angeles Times as perhaps "The World's Biggest Movie Star", Khan has a huge fan following in Asia and the Indian diaspora worldwide with a significant following in Europe as well. He is one of the richest actors in the world, with an estimated net worth of US$770 million, and his work in Bollywood has earned him numerous accolades.

Khan started his career with appearances in many television series in the late 1980s. He made his film debut in 1992 with Deewana. Early in his career, Khan was recognised for portraying villainous roles in the films Baazigar (1993), Darr (1993), and Anjaam (1994). He then rose to prominence after starring in a series of romantic films, including Kabhi Haan Kabhi Naa (1993), Dilwale Dulhania Le Jayenge (1995), Dil To Pagal Hai (1997), Kuch Kuch Hota Hai (1998) and Kabhi Khushi Kabhie Gham (2001), among others. Khan garnered critical acclaim for his portrayals of an alcoholic in Devdas (2002), a terminally ill patient in Kal Ho Naa Ho (2003), a NASA scientist in Swades (2004), an incarcerated ex-pilot in Veer Zaara (2004), a wanted criminal in Don (2006) and Don 2 (2012), a hockey coach in Chak De! India (2007), a man with Asperger syndrome in My Name Is Khan (2010), an Army officer in Jab Tak Hai Jaan (2012), a film star and his fan in Fan (2016) and a gangster in Raees (2017), among other roles. After a break of four years, Khan starred in action thrillers Pathaan (2023) and Jawan (2023), which broke numerous box office records, and ranks among the highest grossing Indian films of all time. Khan thus became the first Indian actor to deliver two films that earned over ₹10 billion.

Many of his films display themes of Indian national identity and connections with diaspora communities, or gender, racial, social and religious differences and grievances. For his contributions to film, the Government of India honored him with the Padma Shri, and the Government of France awarded him both the Ordre des Arts et des Lettres and the Légion d'honneur. Additionally, he has been awarded four honorary doctorates.

=== Aamir Khan ===
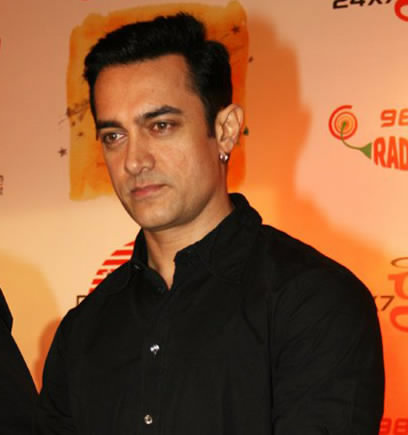
Aamir Khan at an event in 2008. He has been the most internationally successful Indian actor since the late 2000s.

Mohammed Aamir Hussain Khan (born 14 March 1965), better known as Aamir Khan, is one of the biggest and most commercially successful superstars of India. He has a reputation of doing fewer movies but with great attention to detail, including content and quality. In the media, he is often referred to as "Mr. Perfectionist" for his dedication to his work. Through his successful career in Hindi films, Khan has established himself as one of the most popular and influential actors of Indian cinema. In addition to being highly popular in India, he is also highly popular overseas, particularly in China, the second largest movie market. He is "arguably the world's biggest movie star" according to Rob Cain, due to his immense popularity in the world's two most populous nations, India and China.

He is the recipient of numerous awards, including four National Film Awards and seven Filmfare Awards, as well as an Academy Award nomination. He was honoured by the Government of India with the Padma Shri in 2003 and the Padma Bhushan in 2010.

Khan first appeared on screen as a child actor in his uncle Nasir Hussain's film Yaadon Ki Baaraat (1973), the first Bollywood masala film. His first feature film role came with the experimental film Holi (1984), and he began a full-time acting career with a leading role in the highly successful tragic romance Qayamat Se Qayamat Tak (1988). Qayamat Se Qayamat Tak was a milestone in the history of Hindi cinema, setting the tone for Bollywood musical romance films that defined Hindi cinema in the 1990s. His performance in the film and in the thriller Raakh (1989) earned him a Special Jury Award at the National Film Award ceremony. He established himself as a leading actor of Hindi cinema in the 1990s by appearing in several commercially successful films, including the romantic drama Dil (1990), the romance Raja Hindustani (1996), for which he won his first Filmfare Award for Best Actor, and the drama Sarfarosh (1999). He was also recognized for his unconventional role in the critically acclaimed Canadian-Indian film Earth (1998).

In 2001, Khan started a production company, whose first release, Lagaan, was nominated for the Academy Award for Best Foreign Language Film and earned him a National Film Award for Best Popular Film and two more Filmfare Awards (Best Actor and Best Film). After a four-year absence from the screen, Khan continued to portray leading roles, most notably in the 2006 box-office hits Fanaa and Rang De Basanti. The following year, he made his directorial debut with Taare Zameen Par, a major success that garnered him the Filmfare Awards for Best Film and Best Director. Khan's greatest commercial successes came with the thriller Ghajini (2008), the comedy-drama 3 Idiots (2009), the adventure film Dhoom 3 (2013), the satire PK (2014) and wrestling-drama Dangal (2016) all of which held records for being the highest-grossing Indian film of all time.

== Other Khans ==
=== Dilip Kumar (Muhammad Yusuf Khan) ===
Dilip Kumar, whose real name is Muhammad Yusuf Khan, has been retrospectively referred to as the "First Khan" of Bollywood. He debuted in the 1940s, and became the biggest Indian movie star of the 1950s and 1960s. He is credited with bringing realism to film acting in the Indian subcontinent, and is considered one of the greatest and most influential actors of all time. He has been described as "the ultimate method actor" (natural actor) by Satyajit Ray. Kumar was a pioneer of method acting, predating Hollywood method actors such as Marlon Brando. Kumar inspired future generations of Indian actors, from Amitabh Bachchan and Naseeruddin Shah to Shah Rukh Khan to Nawazuddin Siddiqui. In the 1950s, Dilip Kumar became the first actor to charge ₹1 lakh (equivalent to ₹1.2 crore or US$120,000 in 2026) per film.

Kumar is known for his roles in films such as the romantic Andaz (1949), the swashbuckling Aan (1952), the dramatic Devdas (1955), the comical Azaad (1955) and Ram Aur Shyam (1967), the historical Mughal-e-Azam (1960), and the social Ganga Jamuna (1961). His biggest commercial success was portraying Prince Salim in K. Asif's big-budget epic historical film Mughal-e-Azam, which was the highest-grossing film in Indian film history for 15 years until it was surpassed by 1975's Sholay. If adjusted for inflation, Mughal-e-Azam is the highest-grossing Indian film for more than six decades, equivalent to over 2000 crores in 2020.

=== Saif Ali Khan ===
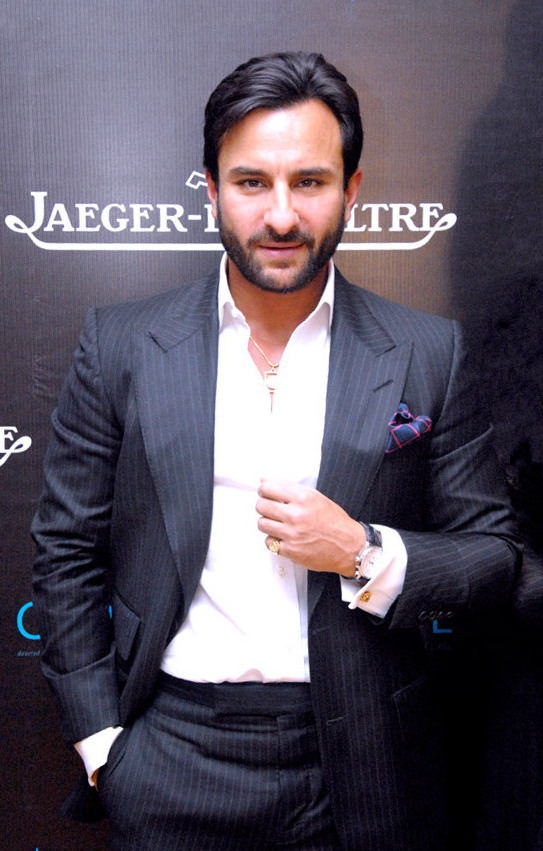
Saif Ali Khan at New Delhi, India in 2012

Saif Ali Khan - referred to as the "Fourth Khan" - is also a film producer, son of Mansoor Ali Khan Pataudi, a former captain of the Indian national cricket team, and actress Sharmila Tagore. The 2004 romantic comedy Hum Tum proved to be Khan's first success in which he played the sole male lead, earning him the National Film Award for Best Actor, and starring roles in the drama Parineeta and the romantic comedy Salaam Namaste (both 2005) established him as a leading actor in Bollywood. He went on to earn wide critical praise for his portrayal of an apprentice in the 2006 English film Being Cyrus, a character based on William Shakespeare's antagonist Iago in the 2006 crime film Omkara and a terrorist in the 2009 thriller Kurbaan. Khan's highest commercial success came with the 2008 thriller Race and its 2013 sequel, the 2009 romance Love Aaj Kal, and the 2012 romantic comedy Cocktail.

=== Irrfan Khan ===
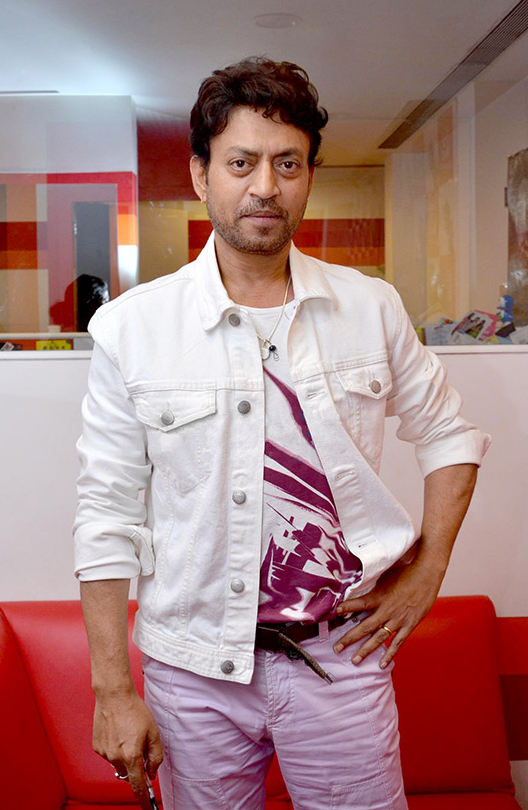
Irrfan Khan in 2015

Irrfan Khan won the National Film Award for Best Actor at the 60th National Film Awards 2012, for his performance in Paan Singh Tomar. Khan had won the 2014 Asian Film Award for Best Actor, the National Film Award for Best Actor, three Filmfare Awards, three International Indian Film Academy Awards, an Independent Spirit Award nomination, and various international honours. He also hosted a television show and commercials. By 2015, he had appeared in more than 50 Indian films in Bollywood, and a number of international films, such as Life of Pi, New York, I Love You, A Mighty Heart, The Amazing Spider-Man, and Jurassic World, with a featured role alongside Tom Hanks in the 2016 adaptation of Dan Brown's novel Inferno. In September 2015, he was appointed as the brand ambassador for "Resurgent Rajasthan", a campaign by the state government of Rajasthan.

Irrfan Khan is sometimes also considered the "fourth Khan", along with Saif Ali Khan. By 2017, Irrfan Khan's films have grossed over US$3.6 billion at the worldwide box office, mostly from his work in international productions. His highest-grossing Hindi films are Hindi Medium (2017) and The Lunchbox (2013). He died of cancer on 29 April 2020 at Kokilaben Dhirubhai Ambani Hospital in Mumbai.

=== Actors ===
==== Male actors ====
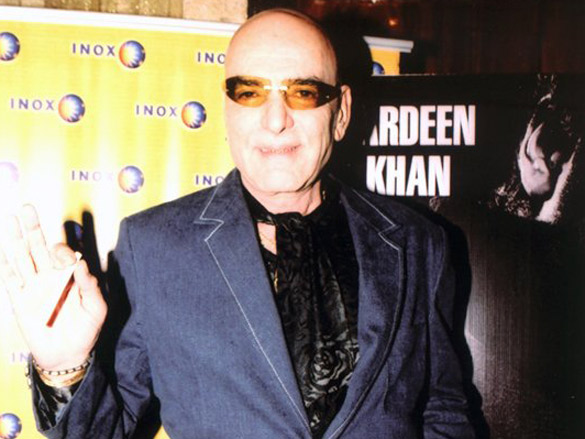
Feroz Khan at premiere of Ek Khiladi Ek Haseena

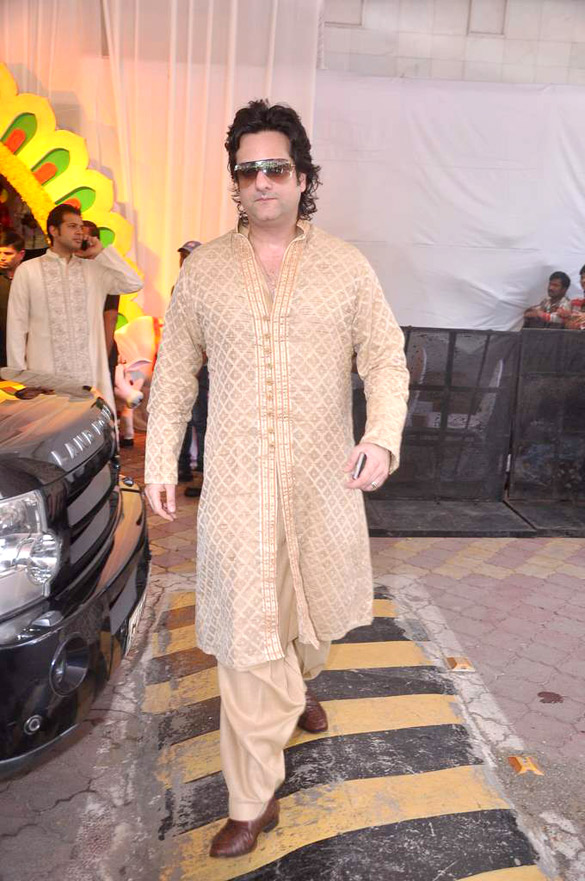
Fardeen Khan at Esha Deol's wedding

- Adnan Khan - Indian actor
- Amjad Khan – also director
- Arbaaz Khan – Salman Khan's brother, also a director and producer
- Ayub Khan – Nasir Khan's son and Dilip Kumar's nephew, also an Indian television actor
- Babil Khan – Irrfan Khan's son and actor
- Faisal Khan – Aamir Khan's brother
- Faraaz Khan – Yusuf Khan's son, Indian actor
- Fardeen Khan – Feroz Khan's son, Indian actor
- Feroz Khan – Fardeen Khan's father, also a film director and producer
- Ibrahim Ali Khan – Actor, Saif Ali Khan Son
- Imran Khan – Aamir Khan's nephew
- Jayant – Amjad Khan's father
- Kader Khan – Indian-Canadian film actor, comedian, script and dialogue writer, as well as director
- Mazhar Khan – Zeenat Amaan's Husband
- Mehboob Khan – best known as a director and producer, also writer
- Nasir Khan – Dilip Kumar's brother
- Nazir Ahmed Khan – director and producer in British India and then Pakistan after partition of India, brother-in-law of filmmaker K. Asif
- Razzak Khan - an Indian actor
- Riyaz Khan – predominantly South Indian actor
- Sahil Khan – an Indian actor
- Sajid Khan – Mehboob Khan's adopted son
- Sanjay Khan – Zayed Khan's father, also a director and producer
- Shadaab Khan – Amjad Khan's son
- Shahbaz Khan – also a television actor
- Sohail Khan – Salman Khan's brother, also a director and producer
- Tariq Khan – Aamir Khan's cousin, Nasir Hussain's nephew
- Yusuf Khan - Faraaz Khan's father, also an Indian actor
- Zain Khan Durrani – also a model
- Zayed Khan – Sanjay Khan's son, also a producer
- Zuber Khan – also a television actor

==== Actresses ====
- Sharmila Tagore (Ayesha Sultana Khan) – actress, model, Central Board of Film Certification chairperson, mother of Saif Ali Khan
- Farah Khan – best known as a dance choreographer, director and producer
- Gauahar Khan – also a model
- Hina Khan – actress
- Jiah Khan – British-American actress who worked in Bollywood
- Kareena Kapoor Khan – Saif Ali Khan's wife, Karishma Kapoor's sister, part of Kapoor family, daughter of actor Randhir Kapoor and actress Babita
- Krutika Desai Khan – actress working in film, television and theater
- Soha Ali Khan – Saif Ali Khan's sister, daughter of actress Sharmila Tagore
- Sana Khan – also a model and dancer
- Sara Ali Khan – Saif Ali Khan's daughter
- Zareen Khan – Bollywood actress who has also appeared in Tamil and Punjabi films

=== Others ===
- Alvira Khan Agnihotri – film producer and fashion designer, Salman Khan's sister and Salim Khan's daughter
- Kabir Khan – director, screenwriter, cinematographer
- Mansoor Khan – director, producer, screenwriter, Nasir Hussain's son, Aamir Khan's cousin
- Nasir Hussain (Nasir Hussain Khan) – director, producer, screenwriter, Aamir Khan's uncle
- Nikhat Khan – film producer, Aamir Khan's sister
- Parvati Khan – Indo-Trinidadian singer and model who worked in Bollywood
- Salim Khan – Salman Khan's father, best known as a screenwriter, as part of screenwriting duo Salim–Javed (along with Javed Akhtar)
- Sajid Khan – director, Farah Khan's brother
- Tahir Hussain (Tahir Hussain Khan) – director, producer, Aamir Khan's father

== See also ==
- 100 Crore Club
- 1000 Crore Club
- Khan (surname)
- List of highest-grossing Indian films
  - List of highest-grossing films in India
- List of highest-grossing Indian films in the overseas markets
  - List of highest-grossing films in China
- List of Hindi film families
  - Salim Khan family (Salman's family)
  - Kapoor family
