= Amir Salman Shahrukh =

- Directed by: Iqbal Suleman
- Based on: Aamir Khan; Salman Khan; Shahrukh Khan
- Produced by: Raju Rahikwar; Prem G. Gangwani; Harish (Babu)
- Starring: Raju Rahikwar; Sagar Pandey; Dewashish Ghosh
- Edited by: Govind Dubey
- Music by: Kumar Sanu; Songs: Kumar Sanu; Udit Narayan; Lalitya Munshaw
- Production companies: Time World Entertainment; Big Bollywood
- Release date: 6 January 2017
- Running time: 109 Minutes
- Country: India
- Language: Hindi

Amir Salman Shahrukh is a 2017 Indian Hindi-language parody film directed by Iqbal Suleman and produced by Raju Rahikwar. It stars Raju Rahikwar who is the lookalike of actor Shah Rukh Khan, Sagar Pandey who is the lookalike of actor Salman Khan and Dewashish Gosh who is the lookalike of actor Aamir Khan.

== Plot ==
Three triplets are born to a mother and at a young age they look like the three Khans of Bollywood: Shah Rukh Khan, Salman Khan and Aamir Khan.

== Cast ==
- Raju Rahikwar as Shah Rukh Khan
- Sagar Pandey as Salman Khan
- Dewashish Ghosh as Aamir Khan

== Songs ==
No.	Title	Singer(s)	Length
1.	"Amir Salman Shah Rukh (Title Song)"	Udit Narayan
