= O Teri =

2014 Indian film by Umesh Bisht

- Theatrical release poster
- Directed by: Umesh Bisht
- Written by: Umesh Bist; Neeti Palta
- Produced by: Atul Agnihotri; Alvira Agnihotri
- Starring: Pulkit Samrat; Bilal Amrohi: Sarah-Jane Dias; Mandira Bedi
- Narrated by: Salman Khan
- Cinematography: Ganesh Rajavelu
- Edited by: Devendra Murdeshwar
- Music by: GJ Singh; Rajiv Bhalla; Hard Kaur
- Production company: Reel Life Productions
- Distributed by: AA Films
- Release date: 28 March 2014
- Running time: 107 minutes
- Country: India
- Language: Hindi
- Budget: ₹150 million
- Box office: est. ₹36 million

O Teri (transl. Oh your...) is a 2014 Indian Hindi-language comedy film directed by Umesh Bisht and produced by Atul Agnihotri and Alvira Khan Agnihotri. It stars Pulkit Samrat, Bilal Amrohi, Sarah-Jane Dias, and Mandira Bedi. The film follows two journalists who come across a big scam. Upon its release on 28 March 2014, the film received generally negative reviews and emerged as a commercial failure.

== Plot ==
Prantabh Pratap, aka PP, and Anand Ishwaram Devdutt Subramanium/AIDS are two journalists and roommates. Their boss, Monsoon, always insults them for the horrid quality of their work. She never believes them and threatens to fire them from their jobs if they lie to her.

One day, PP and AIDS discover CBI officer Avinash Tripathi's dead body in their car and attempt to take it to their office. However, by the time PP and AIDS find Monsoon, the dead body has vanished, causing Monsoon to think PP and AIDS lied, and hence she fires them from their jobs. Frustrated, one day PP and AIDS are walking on a bridge which somehow collapses on the highway. On the news, some people suggest the reason for the collapse could be a sonic boom, no blessings, or the screwdriver not being inserted.

PP and AIDS somehow discover that the dead body caused the bridge to fall. The police take it away from them and later they end up with a CD that could expose a corrupt politician. The politicians chase PP and AIDS into a warehouse where eventually the police arrive and Monsoon realises that the men were telling the truth all this while. The politicians get arrested, and PP and AIDS become nationwide heroes.

== Cast ==
- Pulkit Samrat as Prantabh Pratap/PP
- Bilal Amrohi as Anand Ishwaram Devdutt Subramanium/AIDS
- Kuldeep Sareen as a dead man
- Sarah-Jane Dias as Monsoon Krishnacharya
- Mandira Bedi as Sherry (Special Guest)
- Ajay Berry as Jagan
- Vijay Raaz as Bhanwar Singh Kilol (Opposition Leader)
- Anupam Kher as Bilal Khawaja (Asian Olympic Games Chairman)
- Manoj Pahwa as L. Chadhha
- Murali Sharma as Nata
- Himani Shivpuri as Pratap's mother
- Sidharth Bhardwaj as Police Constable
- Sara Loren as Self
- Razak Khan as Dhaba Owner
- Jatin Sarna as Drunk Police Officer
- Denzil Smith as Murli Manohar Mahapatra
- Blake Curtis as Woodcock, the title song item girl
- Mohan Kapur as Newspaper Editor
- Salman Khan in a special appearance in the titular song O Teri

== Box office ==
The film which released alongside Dishkiyaoon and Youngistaan in approximately 1000 theatres across India saw a "poor" opening occupancy of 5-10%.

== Soundtrack ==
Music was composed by GJ Singh, Rajiv Jhalla and Hard Kaur. Lyrics were penned by Kumaar, Abhinav Chaturvedi and Akshay K. Saxena.

Track listing
No.	Title	Lyrics	Music	Singer(s)	Length
1.	"Butt Patlo"	Kumaar	GJ Singh	Jaspreet Jasz & Roshni Baptist	3:26
2.	"Akhan Vich"	Kumaar	GJ Singh	GJ Singh, Jaspreet Jasz and Neeti Mohan	3:24
3.	"Ummbakkum"	Abhinav Chaturvedi	GJ Singh	Iulia Vântur, Mika Singh and Jaspreet Jasz	2:59
4.	"Phollo Karta"	Kumaar	Hard Kaur	Manish J. Tipu	4:10
5.	"Ummbakkum" (Remix)	Abhinav Chaturvedi	Remixed by DJ Arya Acharya	Iulia Vantur, Mika Singh and Jaspreet Jasz	3:13
6.	"O Teri"	Akshay K. Saxena	Rajiv Bhalla	Rajiv Bhalla, Pooja Bhalla, Adnan Sami and Neuman Pinto	3:14
