= Alizeh Agnihotri =

Indian actress (born 2000)

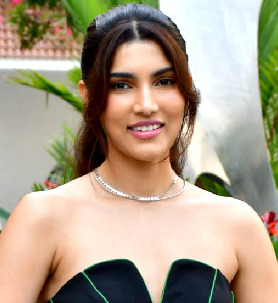
- Agnihotri in 2024
- Born: 1 November 1996 (age 29); Mumbai, Maharashtra, India
- Other name: Alizeh
- Occupation: Actress
- Parents: Atul Agnihotri (father); Alvira Khan (mother)
- Relatives: Salim Khan family

Alizeh Agnihotri (born 1 November 1996), credited mononymously as Alizeh, is an Indian actress who works in Hindi films. She is the niece of Salman Khan, the daughter of actor Atul Agnihotri and producer Alvira Khan. Agnihotri made her debut in the 2023 film Farrey.

== Early life ==
Agnihotri was born on 1 November 1996 in Mumbai to actor, producer and director Atul Agnihotri and Alvira Khan. She is the younger child to the couple and has an elder brother named Ayaan Agnihotri.

Agnihotri pursued her schooling at Dhirubhai Ambani International School in Mumbai and completed her B.A. at SOAS University of London in Developmental Studies in 2022.

== Career ==
In 2023, Agnihotri made her official debut with film Farrey. The movie was premiered at 54th International Film Festival of India and it was released theatrically, on 24 November 2023. Alaka Sahani of The Indian Express gave 3 stars out of 5 and praised Agnihotri's performance and said "it is Agnihotri, whose intelligence as well as ambition is at the centre of Farrey, holds the story together and keeps her character relatable. She also deftly portrays Niyati's transitions at different stages of the movie." For her performance in the film, she won various accolades including Filmfare Award for Best Female Debut.

== Media image ==
In 2024, Alizeh was placed in the "35 most influential young Indians" list by GQ. and was featured on various magazine covers including Hello!, The Word, and Grazia. Alizeh is also a celebrity endorser for several brands and products, including Being Human Clothing, Tory Burch LLC, and Nykaa.

== Filmography ==
=== Films ===
Year	Title	Role	Notes	Ref.
2023	Farrey	Niyati Singh	debut film	

== Awards and nominations ==
Year	Award	Category	Work	Result	Ref.
2024	69th Filmfare Awards	Best Female Debut	Farrey	Won	
2024	Zee Cine Awards	Best Female Debut	Farrey	Won	
2024	Pinkvilla Screen and Style Icons Awards	Best Debut Actress	Farrey	Won	
2024	News 18 Reel Awards	Best Debut Actress	Farrey	Won	
2024	Indian Film Festival of Melbourne	Best Actress	Farrey	Nominated	
2024	International Indian Film Academy Award	Star Debut of the Year – Female	Farrey	Won	
