= Maine Dil Tujhko Diya =

Maine dil Tujh ko Diya
- Movie poster
- Directed by: Sohail Khan
- Produced by: Sohail Khan
- Starring: Sohail Khan
- Cinematography: Sohail Khan
- Music by: Daboo Malik
- Release date: 23 August 2002
- Running time: 159 minutes
- Country: India
- Language: Hindi

Maine Dil Tujhko Diya (English: I gave my heart to you) is a 2002 Indian Hindi-language romantic action film, directed, produced, written by and starring Sohail Khan, who makes his acting debut along with another debutante, Sameera Reddy. The film also features Sanjay Dutt, Kabir Bedi and Dalip Tahil in supporting roles.

== Plot ==
Ajay is head of his college group named the Aryans, and they all wear the same jacket. Ajay is introduced to a girl named Ayesha, and they become friends first. Gradually, Ajay and Ayesha fall in love with each other. This enrages Ayesha's father Ranjit because of Ajay's status as a poor man. Ajay challenges to get Ayesha back to him in the nick of time, which seems quite challenging to Ranjit, whose friend and business partner, Vishal Chopra, also becomes enraged and decides to finish off Ajay, but with an ulterior motive, for his son Raman to marry Ayesha to acquire the Verma family's wealth.

Chopra appoints a notorious criminal, Bhaijaan, to finish off Ajay. Bhaijaan, however, refuses to do so himself, as he does not kill people in the month of Ramadan, so he appoints his two head henchmen, Munna and Chhote. Ajay at first empowers them during a fight, but no sooner do they appoint a gang to beat up Ajay brutally and leave him for dead on the street. Ajay recovers quite soon from his injuries and enters Ranjit's mansion through the gate. An enraged Ajay challenges him to get back Ayesha at any and all costs. Ranjit, too, keeps one condition: if within 24 hours he doesn't get back to Ayesha, he will have to get out of her life forever. Ajay accepts this deal as he is studying business. Again, Vishal plans a conspiracy and has Ajay arrested without any crime.

The police inspector, Raman, first beats Ajay up, but then gets almost equally beaten up brutally, and Ajay escapes from prison. Vishal calls Chhote to kill Ajay and promises to give him loads of money, but Chhote replies that Ramadan is over and Bhaijaan will finish Ajay, and so he doesn't need the money. This conversation gets taped by Ayesha's younger sister. Ajay gets surrounded by henchmen and knocks on each one but is interrupted by Bhaijaan. Just before Bhaijaan is about to kill Ajay, the former says he is in love and will die only once in love. This causes Bhaijaan to undergo a change of heart, as he once had a brother, Irfan, who committed suicide because Bhaijaan didn't care for his feelings towards a girl he deeply loved.

During Eid ul Fitr, Bhaijaan thanks God for giving a pretty boy like Ajay in return for his deceased brother and decides to help him. The very day, Ajay arrives at the Verma mansion within 24 hours and decides to stop Ayesha's marriage to Vishal's son. Chhote disobeys Bhaijaan, and soon a fight ensues.

Bhaijaan requests Ajay to go, but he is beaten up badly. Ajay interrupts the wedding and points a gun at Ranjit, which is given to him by the priest. Soon, Ajay and Ayesha get married quickly. Just when Verma is about to kill Ajay, at that second Mini plays the tape of the deal to her father, and soon Vishal and Raman are kicked off of the house. Bhaijaan kills all the henchmen with a sword and finally slits Munna and Chhote with a sword. The film ends on a happy note with Ayesha and Ajay being united and Bhaijaan reconciling with Ajay because he reminds him of his brother, who was also pretty.

== Cast ==
- Sohail Khan as Ajay
- Sanjay Dutt as Bhaijaan
- Sameera Reddy as Ayesha Verma
- Eijaz Khan as Eijaz Bilal, Ajay's friend.
- Kabir Bedi as Mr. Ranjit Verma, Ayesha's father.
- Dalip Tahil as Mr. Vishal Chopra
- Amrita Prakash as Mini, Ayesha's sister.
- Neeraj Vora as College Principal / Pandit
- Rajpal Yadav as Munna
- Sarfaraz Khan as Chhote
- Raja Bherwani as Chopra’s son
- Bobby Darling
- Sikandar Kharbanda as Head of Warriors' team.
- Nirmal Shah as Chhotu
- Vikas Sharma as Vicky
- Sadanand Yadav as Sada
- Aashif Sheikh as Inspector Raman

== Soundtrack ==
Maine Dil Tujhko Diya

Soundtrack album by Daboo Malik
- Released: May 2002
- Genre: Feature film soundtrack
- Label: T-Series

The lyrics for the film were penned by Faaiz Anwar, Salim Bijnori, Gufi Paintal, Jalees & Rashid, while the music was composed by Daboo Malik. The song "Thoda Sa Pyar Hua Hai" is copied from Urdu Song "Yaad To Aati Hogi" Which Sung By Sajjad Ali in 1995.

#	Title	Singer(s)	Length
1	"Thoda Sa Pyar Hua Hai"	Udit Narayan, Alka Yagnik	04:52
2	"Thoda Sa Pyar" (Sad)	Sonu Nigam	05:05
3	"Aaja Ve Saajan"	Alka Yagnik, Sunidhi Chauhan	04:20
4	"Dil Churane Lagi"	Sonu Nigam, Anuradha Paudwal	06:21
5	"Shanana Na"	Abhijeet, Alka Yagnik, Jordy Patel, Ayub, Surjit Ahuja	06:20
6	"Maine Dil Tuhjko Diya"	Sonu Nigam, Sunidhi Chauhan	07:13
7	"Kuchh Bhi Nahin Kuchh Nahin"	Udit Narayan, Alka Yagnik	05:52

== Critical reception ==
Taran Adarsh of IndiaFM rated the film 2 out of 5, praising the acting and direction. Sukanya Verma of Rediff.com criticised the film, writing, "It is disappointing to see young directors like Sohail Khan or Kunal Kohli (Mujhse Dosti Karoge) resort to age-old formulae instead of breaking new ground and dabbling with new, imaginative ideas.".
