= Farrey =

2023 Indian film

- Theatrical release poster
- Directed by: Soumendra Padhi
- Written by: Soumendra Padhi; Abhishek Yadav Jeetendra Nath Jeetu
- Based on: Bad Genius by Nattawut Poonpiriya
- Produced by: Atul Agnihotri; Alvira Khan; Sunir Kheterpal; Nikhil Namit; Y. Ravi Shankar; Naveen Yerneni; Salman Khan
- Starring: Alizeh Agnihotri; Sahil Mehta; Zeyn Shaw; Prasanna Bisht; Ronit Roy
- Cinematography: Keiko Nakahara
- Edited by: Zubin Sheikh
- Music by: Score: Sidhant Mathur; Songs: Sachin–Jigar
- Production companies: Salman Khan Films; Mythri Movie Makers; Athena; Reel Life Productions
- Distributed by: PVR Inox Pictures
- Release date: 24 November 2023
- Running time: 130 minutes
- Country: India
- Language: Hindi
- Box office: ₹2.25 crore

Farrey is a 2023 Indian Hindi-language heist thriller film directed by Soumendra Padhi. It stars Alizeh Agnihotri in the lead role with Sahil Mehta, Zeyn Shaw, Prasanna Bisht, Ronit Roy, Juhi Babbar and Shilpa Shukla. It is an official remake of the 2017 Thai film Bad Genius.

Farrey premiered at 54th International Film Festival of India and it was released theatrically, on 24 November 2023.

== Plot ==
Niyati has been lovingly brought up in an orphanage by a kind warden and his caring wife. She has been a top student throughout her life and passes her 10th exams with flying colours, prompting the topmost school in India to offer her a full scholarship for the next two years. She becomes the top student there too, her only competition being another student from the underprivileged class, Aakash, who too has been granted the same scholarship. Their joy comes full circle when the principal of the school, informs them that the school has chosen them to sit in the prestigious Oxford University entrance test, which will help them gain a full scholarship if selected.

Niyati makes friends with Chhavi, who is affluent but weak in studies. Chhavi asks her to help out during the exams, and Niyati, at first does it out of friendship and later starts doing it for the money. But she doesn't keep the money for herself, and rather sends donations for her orphanage. There is a worldwide entrance exam, on the basis of which students can gain admission into a top college abroad. The rich kids pay an obnoxious amount of money to both Niyati and Aakash to help them crack it. The two brilliant students utilize their genius to come up with the perfect plan to achieve that goal. However, Both are in danger of losing their innocence. Whether they stay true to the right path or lose themselves in the blind pursuit of money, forms the crux of the film.

== Cast ==
- Alizeh Agnihotri as Niyati Singh
- Sahil Mehta as Aakash
- Zeyn Shaw as Prateek
- Prasanna Bisht as Chhavi
- Ronit Roy as Ishrat Kada Singh
- Arbaaz Khan as Chavi's father
- Juhi Babbar as Zoya Singh
- Shilpa Shukla as Vedita Matthew

== Music ==
Farrey

Soundtrack album by Sachin–Jigar
- Released: 20 November 2023
- Genre: Feature film soundtrack
- Length: 11:44
- Language: Hindi
- Label: Zee Music Company

Sachin–Jigar chronology
Aankh Micholi (2023)	Farrey (2023)	Murder Mubarak (2024)

Official audio
- Farrey - Full Album on YouTube

The music for the film composed by Sachin–Jigar. Lyrics are written by Jigar Saraiya, Mellow D, Abhishek Dubey, Sachin–Jigar and MC STΔN.

No.	Title	Lyrics	Singer(S)	Length
1.	"Ghar Pe Party Hai"	Jigar Saraiya, Mellow D	Badshah, Aastha Gill, Mellow D, Sachin–Jigar	2:40
2.	"Machade Tabahi"	Abhishek Dubey	Sunidhi Chauhan	2:57
3.	"Farrey Title Track"	Abhishek Dubey, MC Stan	MC Stan, Sachin–Jigar, Maanuni Desai	3:05
4.	"O Bandeya"	Jigar Saraiya	King, Sachin–Jigar	3:01
Total length:				11:43

== Release ==
=== Theatrical ===
Farrey had its theatrical release on 24 November 2023. It was released on 1000 screens domestically.

=== Home media ===
Farrey was released on the streaming platform ZEE5 on 5 April 2024.

== Reception ==
Farrey received positive reviews from critics. Alizeh's performance was praised.

On the review aggregator website Rotten Tomatoes, 90% of 10 critics' reviews are positive, with an average rating of 6.2/10.

Saibal Chatterjee of NDTV scored the film at 2.5 out of 5 stars and says "Alizeh is Farrey's brightest point, by far. She plays a big part and gives it credit. Sahil Mehta, Prasanna Bisht, and Zeyn Shaw, the other three young performers in the ensemble, have somewhat less nuanced roles to portray, but they nonetheless give the movie a steady energy." Tushar Joshi of India Today This ensemble of young stars aces the thrill mark sheet". Vinamra Mathur of Firstpost labelled the film "Alizeh Agnihotri, Salman Khan's niece, debuts with assurance in a gripping thriller." Alaka Sahani of The Indian Express gave 3 stars out of 5 and praised Agnihotri's performance and said "it is Agnihotri, whose intelligence as well as ambition is at the centre of Farrey, holds the story together and keeps her character relatable. She also deftly portrays Niyati’s transitions at different stages of the movie." Prannay Pathak of Hindustan Times said "Alizeh Agnihotri, Salman Khan's niece, makes a strong cinematic debut in Soumendra Padhi's latest feature". Pratikshya Mishra of The Quint gave 3 stars out of 5 and said "Alizeh stands out from the rest of the cast, in part because her character is the most developed and in part because of her on-screen persona, which helps the audience identify with the character."

== Accolades ==
Year	Award	Category	Recipient	Result	Ref.
2024	Filmfare Awards	Best Female Debut	Alizeh Agnihotri	Won	
2024	Zee Cine Awards	Best Female Debut	Alizeh Agnihotri	Won	
2024	Pinkvilla Screen and Style Icons Awards	Best Debut Actress	Alizeh Agnihotri	Won	
2024	News 18 Reel Awards	Best Debut Actress	Alizeh Agnihotri	Won	
2024	International Indian Film Academy Awards	Star Debut of the Year – Female	Alizeh Agnihotri	Won	
