= Bharat (film) =

2019 Indian film by Ali Abbas Zafar

- Theatrical release poster
- Directed by: Ali Abbas Zafar
- Written by: Ali Abbas Zafar; Varun V. Sharma (Note: Credited for screenplay and dialogue)
- Based on: Ode to My Father by Yoon Je-kyoon
- Produced by: Atul Agnihotri; Alvira Khan Agnihotri; Bhushan Kumar; Krishan Kumar; Nikhil Namit; Salman Khan
- Starring: Salman Khan; Katrina Kaif; Disha Patani; Sunil Grover; Jackie Shroff
- Cinematography: Marcin Laskawiec
- Edited by: Rameshwar S. Bhagat
- Music by: Score: Julius Packiam; Songs: Vishal–Shekhar
- Production companies: Reel Life Productions; Salman Khan Films; T-Series
- Distributed by: AA Films
- Release date: 5 June 2019
- Running time: 155 minutes
- Country: India
- Language: Hindi
- Budget: ₹100 crore
- Box office: ₹325.58 crore

Bharat (pronounced [ˈbʱaːrət] transl. India) (Note: Also the title character, who is named after the country.) is a 2019 Indian Hindi-language drama film directed and co-written by Ali Abbas Zafar. It is jointly produced by Atul Agnihotri, Alvira Khan Agnihotri, Bhushan Kumar, Krishan Kumar, Nikhil Namit and Salman Khan under the banners Reel Life Productions, Salman Khan Films and T-Series. The film stars Salman Khan, Katrina Kaif, Sunil Grover, Jackie Shroff, Disha Patani and Tabu. An adaptation of the South Korean film, Ode to My Father (2014), it traces India's post-independence history from the perspective of a common man, and follows his life from the age of 8 to 70.

Bharat was theatrically released in India on 5 June 2019, on the occasion of Eid al-Fitr. It received mixed reviews from critics, who appreciated the performances of the cast, story and screenplay, criticising the second half. The film earned ₹42.30 crores on its first day. It was one of the highest grossing films of 2019. It grossed ₹325.58 crore in its lifetime theatrical run, becoming a commercial success.

== Plot ==
In 2010, Bharat Kumar, a shopkeeper in Delhi refuses to sell his store despite lucrative offers. On his 70th birthday, he tells his past to his grandniece, and the film goes into flashback.

=== Partition, 1947 ===
Bharat, aged 7, along with his parents and siblings board a train to India with many other refugees for safety from the riots in Pakistan. He loses his baby sister "Gudia" in the chaos. Their father, Gautam, stays there to search for Gudia, after Bharat promises to care for the family. He moves to the imported goods store of Gautam's sister Jamuna and her husband Keemat Rai Kapoor, and meets a roadside circus worker, Radha. They two fall in love, and join The Great Russian Circus.

=== 17 years later (1964) ===
Bharat has gained a lot of fame over the years he has spent at the circus. His brother Chote suffers an accident while trying to emulate him. Bharat bids a tearful goodbye to Radha. He and his friend, Vilayati, look for jobs when the country is shocked due to Prime Minister Jawaharlal Nehru's death.

=== 11 years later (1975) ===
Bharat joins many Indian migrants in Saudi Arabia, following an oil discovery, to earn money for his sister Mehek's marriage. There he falls in love with his chief engineer Kumud, who proposes to marry him. Bharat refuses, thinking it would come in his way of fulfilling Gautam's promise. Once the two arrive back in India, Kumud announces her love for him. They begin a live-in relationship.

=== 8 years later (1983) ===
Bharat starts to work as a stationmaster after Jamuna dies. During the 1983 Cricket World Cup, Keemat decides to sell the store due to a need of money and asks Bharat to buy it. Bharat initially refuses as he hopes to keep the promise he made to Gautam, still believing he would one day come back, however he reluctantly agrees. Bharat leaves India, with his friend Vilayati, to become a sailor for 8 months and earns money to buy the store.

=== 12 years later (1995) ===
After the economic liberalisation in India, Kumud becomes the creative director of the newly formed Zee TV and runs a program to unite the relatives of people who were separated during the partition. Bharat reconnects with Meher, a London citizen adopted by a British family during the partition, and realises that she is Gudia, who returns to India. An emotional reunion ensues where Bharat learns that Janki had died, prompting Bharat to find Gautam.

=== Present day (2010) ===
An elderly Bharat finally decides to sell the store, something which he had stubbornly refused to do despite the store losing money. Before reaching the train, Gautam had promised Bharat that he would reunite with him at the store, which had explained why Bharat had held on to the store for all that time. Bharat concludes that Gautam is likely to have passed away as he is too old to have survived. Bharat sees a vision of him, where Gautam assures him to move on. A tearful Bharat finally decides to move on and marries Kumud.

== Cast ==
- Salman Khan as Bharat Kumar
  - Kabir Sajid Sheikh as Young Bharat
- Katrina Kaif as Kumud Raina
- Sunil Grover as Syed Vilayati Salim Yousuf Ataullah Khan / Vilayati Khan
  - Aryan Prajapati as Young Vilayati
- Jackie Shroff as Gautam Darshan Kumar
- Disha Patani as Radha Mathur
  - Riva Arora as Young Radha
- Tabu as Meher Gautam Kumar ''Gudiya'' (cameo appearance)
- Satish Kaushik as Naval Officer Jayram Shirodkar
- Sonali Kulkarni as Janki Devi, Bharat's mother
- Aasif Sheikh as Mehek's husband and Bharat's brother-in-law
- Nivin Ramani as Kayaag Zaveri
- Nora Fatehi as Suzan Vilayati Khan
- Shashank Arora as Chaman "Chote" Gautam Kumar
- Kashmira Irani as Mehek Gautam Kumar
- Kumud Mishra as Keemat Rai Kapoor, Jamuna's husband
- Ayesha Raza Mishra as Jamuna Darshan Kumar, Bharat's aunt
- Shehzaad Khan as National Employment Exchange Officer
- Ivan Sylvester Rodrigues as Shurlabh Gupta
- Edwin De La Renta as Pirate Gang Leader Michael Mascarenhas
- Brijendra Kala as Ranjeet Chacha
- Yash Abbad as Officer
- Gurvinder Singh Malhotra as Zalzala Singh

== Production ==
Bharat is a remake of the South Korean film Ode to My Father (2014), which traces the history of South Korea parallel to a man's life, spanning from the 1950s to the 2010s.

Bharat began principal photography in mid-April 2018, and was shot in Abu Dhabi, Spain, Malta, Punjab, Delhi and elsewhere. Priyanka Chopra, who was cast as one of the leading ladies, opted out of the film days before filming her scenes. Nikhil Namit, CEO of Reel Life Productions, said that Priyanka quit due to her engagement to Nick Jonas. She was replaced by Katrina Kaif. Kaif shared the news on her Instagram account that filming was wrapped up on 5 March 2019. The climax was shot in Film City.

== Soundtrack ==
Bharat

Soundtrack album by Vishal–Shekhar
- Released: 17 May 2019
- Recorded: 2018
- Genre: Feature film soundtrack
- Length: 35:32
- Language: Hindi
- Label: T-Series
- Producers: Meghdeep Bose, Abhijit Nalani

Vishal–Shekhar chronology
| Student of the Year 2 (2019) | Bharat (2019) | War (2019) |
External audio
- Audio Jukebox on YouTube

The songs featured in the film were composed by Vishal–Shekhar, lyrics written by Irshad Kamil, with music arranger & producer Meghdeep Bose. Zafar wrote and composed the song "Zinda" with Julius Packiam. It is released under the banner T-Series. Devarsi Ghosh of Scroll.in positively summarised the soundtrack review as 'near-perfect.' Firstpost praised the song Chashni as "soul-stirringly beautiful." "Chashni" song was originally sung by Atif Aslam but was replaced.

Track listing
| No. | Title | Singer(s) | Length |
|---|---|---|---|
| 1. | "Slow Motion" | Nakash Aziz, Shreya Ghoshal | 4:07 |
| 2. | "Chashni" | Abhijeet Srivastava | 4:25 |
| 3. | "Aithey Aa" | Akasa Singh, Neeti Mohan, Kamaal Khan | 3:39 |
| 4. | "Zinda" | Vishal Dadlani | 2:20 |
| 5. | "Turpeya" | Sukhwinder Singh | 4:34 |
| 6. | "Aaya Na Tu" | Jyoti Nooran | 5:57 |
| 7. | "Thap Thap" | Sukhwinder Singh | 2:53 |
| 8. | "Chashni" (Reprise) | Neha Bhasin | 3:59 |
| 9. | "Aithey Aa" (Dance Version) | Nakash Aziz, Neeti Mohan | 3:38 |
| 10. | "Chashni" | Atif Aslam | 4:46 |
| Total length: | | | 35:32 |

== Release ==
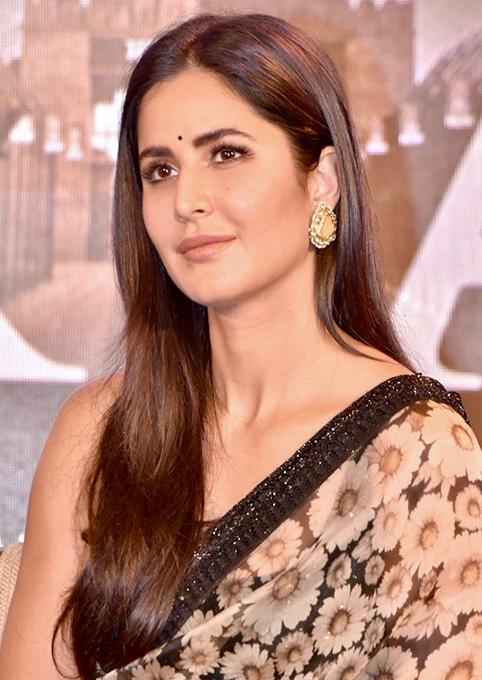
Kaif promoting Bharat in 2019

Bharat was released on 5 June 2019 on the occasion of Eid al-Fitr, worldwide on 6000 screens including 4700 screens in India. The film was made available for video on demand on Amazon Prime Video in August 2019.

== Reception ==
=== Critical response ===
As of October 2021, the film holds a 32% approval rating on review aggregator website Rotten Tomatoes, based on 19 reviews with an average rating of 5.3/10. Bharat received positive reviews from critics on release.

Renuka Vyavahare of The Times of India gave the film three and a half stars out of five, calling it "an exhausting, scattered watch despite the entertainment, humour and nobility it propagates". She concluded, "Bharat is well-intentioned, entertaining and doesn't succumb to the trappings of commercial potboilers". Priyanka Sinha Jha of News18, praising Khan for his performance rates the film with three stars out of five, and feels that the script is a bit lengthy and required 'sharper' editing. In the end, She says, "For all its virtues, Bharat falls short of becoming a tour de force, but it could turn into a crowd-puller." Trade analyst and critic Taran Adarsh concurs with Jha on script trimming and gives four stars out of five. Declaring it "smash-hit", he praises Ali for direction, Kaif, and Khan for performance. He feels that the film is an emotional journey that wins the viewers over. Manjusha Radhakrishnan of the Gulf News, also says that it would have benefited from trimming so finds the film 'dull', that is likely to test the patience of the audience. And, she gives it two stars out of five. Ananya Bhattacharya writing for India Today praised acting of Kaif and Khan but feels that the main attraction is Sunil Grover. She also rates it with three stars out of five and concludes that Salman has given his fans 'an out-and-out entertainer'. Rajeev Masand writing for News18, finds the film "unmistakably boring" and "excruciatingly long". He rates the film with two stars out of five. Anna M. M. Vetticad of Firstpost finds the film laden with weak 'humor' and 'lackluster' songs. Rating it with two stars out of five, Vetticad concludes, "Far from being a Forrest Gump with Salman Khan, Bharat is mostly a plodding trek through post-1947 to contemporary India." Jyoti Sharma Bawa of the Hindustan Times finds it 'an emotional Eid winner' and rates it with three stars out of five. Shubhra Gupta of The Indian Express gave two and a half stars out of five and opines, "The good thing about the film, despite its eye-roll moments, is its attempt to create an 'ordinary' man without any particular skills.". Anupama Chopra of Film Companion, "Madam Sir, a woman with courage and conviction, is the most memorable character in Bharat. I'd love to see contemporary history told from her perspective. This version has sweep and swagger but not enough soul."

=== Box office ===
Bharat's opening day domestic collection was ₹42.30 crore. This is the highest opening day collection for Salman Khan. On the second day, its screenings dipped in multiplexes, yet remained strong in single-screen theatres and earned 31 crore – raising the total to Rs 78.87 crore. As of 25 September 2019, with a gross of ₹251.27 crore in India and ₹74.31 crore overseas, the film has a worldwide gross collection of ₹325.58 crore.

Bharat is the fifth highest grossing Bollywood film of 2019. Based on domestic net collection the film is among top twenty in the list of Hindi films with highest domestic net collection.
