= Sohail Khan =

Indian actor and filmmaker (born 1969)

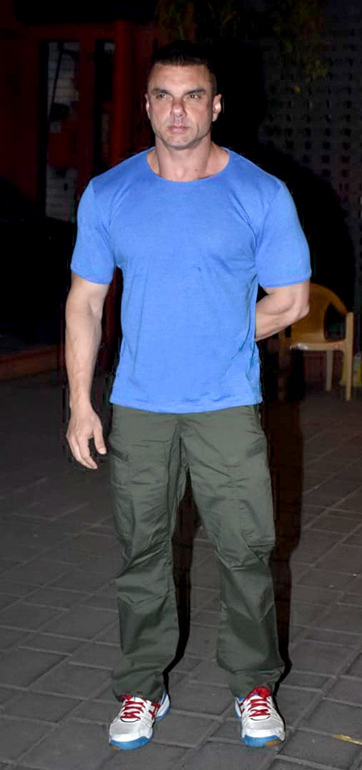
- Khan in 2018
- Born: Sohail Salim Khan; 20 December 1969 (age 56); Bombay, Maharashtra, India (present-day Mumbai)
- Occupations: Actor; film director; film producer; writer
- Years active: 1997–present
- Spouse: Seema Sajdeh (m. 1998; div. 2022)
- Children: 2
- Parent(s): Salim Khan (father); Helen (step-mother)
- Relatives: Salman Khan (brother); Arbaaz Khan (brother); Alvira Khan Agnihotri (sister)
- Family: Salim Khan family

Sohail Salim Khan (born 20 December 1969) is an Indian actor and producer who works mainly in Hindi cinema. He is the younger brother of actors Salman Khan and Arbaaz Khan. He has an elder sister, Alvira Khan Agnihotri. He produces films under his banner Sohail Khan Productions.

== Early life ==
Khan was born in Bombay (present-day Mumbai) to screenwriter Salim Khan and his wife Sushila Charak who later changed her name to Salma Khan. He is the brother of actors Salman Khan and Arbaaz Khan. His paternal family are Muslim Pashtuns who settled in Indore, Madhya Pradesh, while his mother is Dogra and Marathi. His stepmother, Salim Khan's second wife, is actress Helen. His older brothers are Salman Khan and Arbaaz Khan, who was married to actress, VJ and host Malaika Arora. His sister Alvira Khan, is married to Bollywood director Atul Agnihotri, and his younger sister Arpita Khan collaborated with Sneha Ullal for his movie, which he produced with Sohail Khan Productions. Arpita is married to film actor Aayush Sharma.

== Career ==
Khan started his career as a film producer and director making his directorial debut with the 1997 action thriller Auzaar, starring his brother Salman and Sanjay Kapoor. He then directed both of his brothers Salman and Arbaaz in the hit film Pyaar Kiya To Darna Kya (1998) and the less successful Hello Brother (1999) under his earlier banner "G.S. Entertainment".

In 2002, he wrote, produced, directed and made his acting debut in Maine Dil Tujhko Diya, which did average business at the box office. He then appeared in a few more films, none of which sold well. He had his first success with the film Maine Pyaar Kyun Kiya? (2005) in which he co-starred with his brother Salman Khan. He also wrote the story, produced and starred in the multi-starrer Fight Club - Members Only, which again did not do well at the box office. In 2006, due to a delayed release, the boxing drama Aryan, for which his performance was appreciated, failed to do well. In 2007, he produced another film Partner, which starred his brother Salman Khan and Govinda in the lead roles along with Lara Dutta and Katrina Kaif playing their love-interests, respectively.

Khan has also produced live stage shows in India and all over the world featuring various Indian film stars. His company also produced music videos and even made a foray into television with Chehre Pe Chehra, which was directed by Rishi Vohra. In 2008, he appeared in Hello and Heroes. In 2009, he co-starred with brother Arbaaz in Kisaan and featured in Main Aur Mrs Khanna and Do Knot Disturb. In 2010, he featured in Veer with brother Salman, released on 22 January 2010.

He returned to direction with the film Jai Ho, starring Salman Khan in the lead, which released in January 2014 to mixed reviews. In 2016, he directed Freaky Ali, starring Nawazuddin Siddiqui in the lead and brother Arbaaz in supporting role. In 2017, he returned to acting after seven years appearing alongside brother Salman once again in Tubelight.

In 2020, he purchased the franchise for the Lanka Premier League team Kandy Tuskers.

== Personal life ==
Khan was married to Seema Sajdeh, a Punjabi Hindu, from 1998 to 2022. They had an Arya Samaj wedding before the nikkah. They have two sons, Nirvan and Yohan, (through surrogacy) sometimes also known as Aslam Khan (born June 2011).

== Filmography ==
=== As actor ===
| Year | Title | Role | Notes |
|---|---|---|---|
| 2002 | Maine Dil Tujhko Diya | Ajay | |
| 2003 | Darna Mana Hai | Karan Ahuja | |
| 2003 | Anubhav: An Experience | Jaikishan 'Jackie' | |
| 2004 | Lakeer – Forbidden Lines | Karan Rana | |
| 2004 | I Proud to Be an Indian | I | |
| 2004 | Krishna Cottage | Manav / Amar Khanna | |
| 2005 | Maine Pyaar Kyun Kiya? | Pyare Mohan | |
| 2006 | Fight Club - Members Only | Sameer Kapoor | |
| 2006 | Aryan | Aryan Verma | |
| 2007 | Salaam-e-Ishq: A Tribute to Love | Ram Dayal | |
| 2007 | Partner | Prem's brother-in-law | Cameo (photograph only) |
| 2008 | Jaane Tu... Ya Jaane Na | Bagheere | |
| 2008 | God Tussi Great Ho | Rakesh 'Rocky' Sharma | |
| 2008 | Hello | Varun Anand / Vroom/ Victor | |
| 2008 | Heroes | Sameer 'Saand' Suri | |
| 2009 | Team - The Force | Raj | |
| 2009 | Kisaan | Jiggar Singh | |
| 2009 | Main Aurr Mrs Khanna | Aakash | |
| 2009 | Do Knot Disturb | Diesel | |
| 2010 | Veer | Poonam 'Punya' Singh | |
| 2010 | Raakh | Karan | |
| 2017 | Tubelight | Bharat Singh Bisht | |
| 2018 | Loveyatri | Bhavish | Cameo appearance |
| 2019 | Dabangg 3 | Inspector Rohit Sharma | Special appearance |
| 2025 | Arjun Son Of Vyjayanthi | Pathaan | Telugu film |

=== As producer ===
| Year | Title | Notes |
|---|---|---|
| 1998 | Pyaar Kiya To Darna Kya | Nominated – Filmfare Award for Best Film |
| 1999 | Hello Brother | |
| 2002 | Maine Dil Tujhko Diya | |
| 2004 | I - Proud to Be an Indian | |
| 2005 | Lucky: No Time for Love | |
| 2005 | Maine Pyaar Kyun Kiya? | |
| 2006 | Fight Club – Members Only | |
| 2007 | Partner | |
| 2008 | God Tussi Great Ho | |
| 2009 | Main Aurr Mrs Khanna | |
| 2009 | Kisaan | |
| 2011 | Ready | |
| 2014 | Jai Ho | |
| 2016 | Freaky Ali | |
| 2021 | Radhe | |

=== As writer ===
| Year | Title |
|---|---|
| 1998 | Pyaar Kiya To Darna Kya |
| 1999 | Hello Brother |
| 2006 | Fight Club – Members Only |
| 2009 | Kisaan |

=== As director ===
| Year | Title | Notes |
|---|---|---|
| 1997 | Auzaar | |
| 1998 | Pyaar Kiya To Darna Kya | Nominated – Filmfare Award for Best Director |
| 1999 | Hello Brother | |
| 2002 | Maine Dil Tujhko Diya | |
| 2014 | Jai Ho | |
| 2016 | Freaky Ali | |

=== Television ===
| Year | Title | Role | Ref. |
|---|---|---|---|
| 2011–2018 | Comedy Circus | Judge | |
| 2017 | Chhote Miyan Dhakad | Judge | |
| 2017 | Super Night with Tubelight | Himself | |
| 2020 | Fabulous Lives of Bollywood Wives | Himself | |
| 2023–2024 | Bigg Boss (Hindi season 17) | Himself | |
| 2026 | Alliance | Contestant | |
