= Bodyguard (2011 Hindi film) =

2011 Indian film by Siddique

- Theatrical release poster
- Directed by: Siddique
- Written by: Siddique; J.P. Chowksey; Kiran Kotrial
- Story by: Siddique
- Based on: Body Guard (2010) by Siddique
- Produced by: Atul Agnihotri; Alvira Khan Agnihotri
- Starring: Salman Khan; Kareena Kapoor; Raj Babbar
- Cinematography: Sejal Shah
- Edited by: Sanjay Sankla
- Music by: Songs: Himesh Reshammiya; Guest Composer: Pritam; Score: Sandeep Shirodkar
- Production companies: Reel Life Productions; Reliance Entertainment
- Distributed by: Reliance Entertainment
- Release date: 31 August 2011 (India)
- Running time: 131 minutes
- Country: India
- Language: Hindi
- Budget: ₹60 crore
- Box office: ₹252.99 crore

Bodyguard is a 2011 Indian Hindi-language romantic action comedy film directed by Siddique. A remake of the 2010 Malayalam film of the same name—also directed by Siddique himself, the film stars Salman Khan and Kareena Kapoor, alongside Raj Babbar, Mahesh Manjrekar, Aditya Pancholi and Hazel Keech in supporting roles.

Bodyguard broke many records upon its release. Within the first day of its release, it went on to become the highest opening day grosser for a Hindi film. The film set another box office record, netting ₹103 crore (US$22.07 million) in its first week, thus becoming the highest opening week grossing Hindi film until then. The film became a commercial success with a worldwide gross of ₹252 crore (US$53.99 million).

== Plot ==
Lovely Balwant Singh is assigned as Divya Rana's bodyguard to protect her against militant political adversaries led by Ranjan Mahatre targeting her father Sartaj Rana, who saved Lovely's mother in a car accident years prior. Divya becomes irritated with Lovely's constant protection, and creates Chhaya, a fellow university student claiming to be in love with Lovely. Although initially hesitant, Lovely gradually grows close to the mysterious Chhaya; Divya's success in gaining greater freedom from his protection allows her to go to a nightclub, where she is attacked and held hostage by Mahatre's men, only to be saved by Lovely.

Divya soon falls in love with Lovely; afraid to reveal her identity, she calls Lovely as Chhaya, and asks him to run away with her. Sartaj is informed by a maid Savita that Lovely and Divya will elope, and sends his men to kill Lovely. Unable to convince Sartaj that Lovely is in love with someone else, Divya tells her friend, Maya, to meet Lovely at a railway station in her place, and tell him the truth. Maya tries to tell Lovely the truth, but upon seeing Sartaj's men at the station, she continues to pretend that she's Chhaya and because she also developed feelings for Lovely, she throws her phone away upon receiving a call from Divya and the pair depart. Years later, Lovely, now a successful businessman living in Canada, returns to visit a retired Sartaj with his son, Sartaj Singh.

Lovely finds Divya still living with her parents, with Sartaj stating his dangerous political career restricted Divya's chances at finding personal love. On the last day of their visit, Sartaj Singh asks Divya to accompany him home as his mother; Sartaj Singh learns of his mother Maya's past from a diary she wrote to him as Maya was dying from cancer, writing her early death was a punishment for her actions. Sartaj Singh apologizes to Divya on his mother's behalf. Lovely tells Sartaj Singh to apologize to Divya, but Sartaj asks Lovely to marry Divya. At the same railway station his parents left, Sartaj Singh disposes of the diary in the trash, but is seen by Lovely, who recovers it, and finds out the truth. He then calls Divya and addresses her as Chhaya; Divya is overwhelmed with joy and the couple finally unite, where they leave for Canada.

== Cast ==
- Salman Khan as Lovely B. Singh
- Kareena Kapoor as Divya S. Rana / Chhaya (a few lines from Mona Ghosh Shetty)
- Hazel Keech as Maya Kapoor
- Raj Babbar as Sartaj Rana, Divya's father
- Rajat Rawail as Surinder Narender Milkha 'Tsunami' Singh
- Mohammad Faizal as Sartaj Singh, Lovely's son
- Reema Debnath as Maid Savita
- Asrani as Shekhar
- Mahesh Manjrekar as Ranjan Mhatre
- Vidya Sinha as Sartaj's sister
- Aditya Pancholi as Vikrant Mhatre
- Chetan Hansraj as Mhatre's brother
- Salim Baig as Mhatre's brother
- Katrina Kaif as an item dancer in the song "Bodyguard"

== Production ==
The film's production company, Reel Life Production Pvt. Ltd, was bought by Reliance Entertainment for ₹45 crore. This earned Reliance the co-producer status and an equal share in the IPR for perpetuity.

The film director Siddique first offered the female lead to Nayanthara, but she refused because she was not interested in playing the same role she had played in the original. The role then went to Kareena Kapoor.

Neerupa Menon, a mutual friend of director Siddique and Alvira Khan, introduced him to Alvira Khan Agnihotri and Atul Agnihotri, the to-be co-producers of the film, suggesting that he should venture into Bollywood. Siddique sent his original Malayalam film to Alvira and Atul as a result of the suggestion and they convinced Salman Khan to watch the film. After watching the film, Khan was very impressed with it and agreed to do the Hindi remake.

Shooting for the film began on 16 January 2011 at the Symbiosis International University campus situated in Pune. The classrooms and academic block of Symbiosis Institute of Business Management were used in the Lavale campus. The shooting later continued in the city of Patiala in Punjab. Two songs from the film were scheduled to be shot in Europe but were later shifted to Film City in Mumbai to cut costs as the film had already exceeded its initial budget.

== Marketing ==
The film's first look and trailer was unveiled on 21 July 2011.

Bodyguard The Movie Game, a promotional mobile video game developed by Jump Games was also released in 2011. Another mobile video game, Bodyguard Action Game, was released by Zapak in 2012.

== Release ==
Bodyguard opened across 2,250 screens in 70 Indian cities and with 482 prints across the overseas territory, released in Dolby Surround 7.1. Reliance Entertainment set aside a marketing and print budget of around ₹22 crore (US$4.71 million) for the film, one of the highest ever in Bollywood. The satellite rights of the film were sold to STAR network for ₹27 crore (US$5.79 million) for seven years.

== Reception ==
=== Critical response ===
The film received mixed to positive reviews from critics. Taran Adarsh of Bollywood Hungama gave a score of 4/5 and said "BODYGUARD works for varied reasons – it has a simple, captivating story with a dramatic twist in the tale, the chemistry between the lead actors is poor but the music is well juxtaposed in the narrative. But its biggest USP is, without doubt, Salman Khan. He carries the film on his broad and brawny shoulders and that alone is the imperative reason for watching this film." Zee News gave the film 4 stars and praised the directorial skills of Siddique: "Kudos to filmmaker Siddique to have presented Salman Khan in a way never seen before! And the action sequences are breathtaking." Samay Live gave it 4 stars and wrote; "There are stunning events of twist in the film which will keep you stay with your seats till the end. Shivesh Kumar of IndiaWeekly awarded the movie 4 out of 5 stars. Kaveree Bamzai of India Today awarded the movie 3 stars and stated: "Anyone who has watched Khan's recent movies will recognise the signs – a killer dialogue which will be remembered till the next blockbuster is manufactured, a signature ring tone, and a pre-fight ritual-in this case, it is taking off his watch. In his review for The Times of India, Gaurav Malani wrote: "Salman Khan is cool and convincing in the title role. His subdued act and charming innocence wins your heart. Kareena Kapoor is likeable ... Bodyguard doesn't catch you off guard. But it's a decent entertainer nonetheless." Phelim O'Neill of The Guardian praised the technical aspects of the film and awarded three of five stars: "Bollywood movies have improved dramatically in technical terms over the last few years. Here the fight and stunt sequences are afforded as much care and attention as the song and dance scenes; it's all top-notch stuff." Daily Bhaskar awarded the movie three out of five stars and wrote: "Salman, Kareena and Siddique serve a good Eid biryani for the audience by blending romance, action and comedy." Shubha Shetty-Saha of MiD DAY gave it two and a half stars saying, "The film is obviously not expected to be intellectually stimulating. But to give it due credit, it provides loads of entertainment, the kind you may have come to expect of a Salman Khan film." Sukanya Verma of Rediff gave it 2.5 of 5 stars and stated: "A standard entertainer with generic ingredients like action, emotion, romance, comedy, song and dance, the Hindi remake of Malayalam super-hit Bodyguard is like a mediocre Pizza Margherita that's gone stingy on the mozzarella, bland on the sauce with nothing except a half-crunchy base and uneven scattering of basil leaves."

The film also received a few negative reviews. Andy Webster of The New York Times said "If only the film's archly slick director, Siddique, had adopted the same winking attitude toward the romantic arc. A twist near the end sends this contrived movie into a maudlin stratosphere from which it doesn't recover. But at least, in Ms. Keech's supporting presence, understated yet palpable, we sense a performer of emerging, and remarkable, star power." Nikhat Kazmi of The Times of India gave 2.5 out of 5 stars and wrote, "The film, a remake of a South Indian hit, may end up as another blockbuster, like most Salman films have been doing in the recent past. Yet, sadly, this one's mostly bluster." Sonia Chopra from Sify gave the film 2.5 stars and said "Bodyguard is endurable (and I say this without any condescension) for those who can forgive the haphazard story and be happy enjoying the songs and watching Salman and Kareena onscreen." Saibal Chatterjee from NDTV gave the film 2/5 stars and concluded that "If you value the mop on your scalp and the grey cells in your head and want guard yourself against this potentially mind-numbing body blow, give it a miss. Better be safe than sorry!" Aniruddha Guha of Daily News and Analysis gave it 2 stars and wrote: "Salman is charming as ever, and the fact that he’s playing a slightly different character would have actually worked to the film’s advantage if it was backed by a better script." Rajeev Masand of CNN-IBN gave it 2 out of 5 stars and called it a lazy remake. Mayank Shekhar of Hindustan Times panned the film giving it one and a half stars. He argued that the film "for more parts, is a sappy romantic pap". Shubra Gupta from The Indian Express also gave it one and a half stars and said "'Bodyguard' can also safely be called in which Salman Continues to Give Us Those Ones." The Hindu in its review said "It's the Salman version of a Karan Johar film of the Nineties that is bound to be compared with the sappiness of Kuch Kuch Hota Hai, given the drama at the end."

== Box office ==
=== India ===
Upon release, the film opened to a phenomenal response at the domestic box office and packed cinema halls, "witnessing 100% occupancy across shows", according to The Economic Times. Box Office India reported that "Bodyguard has smashed all records" and the film went on to become the highest opener of all time across India, grossing ₹21.3 crore (US$4.56 million), thus breaking the record of Dabangg (2010). The film grossed an additional ₹17.3 crore (US$3.71 million) and ₹13.3 crore (US$2.85 million) on its second and third day respectively, bringing the total nett collections to ₹52 crore (US$11.14 million). On its fourth day of release, it netted around ₹14.8 crore (US$3.17 million), and ₹18.8 crore (US$4.03 million) on its fifth day, taking the total nett collection over the extended five-day weekend to ₹85.5 crore (US$18.32 million). The film continued its successful run at the box office netting ₹8.58 crore (US$1.84 million) on Monday, ₹6.5 crore (US$1.39 million) on Tuesday, and ₹5.5 crore (US$1.18 million) on Wednesday. The total nett collections of the extended nine-day first week were ₹109.5 crore (US$23.46 million). During its second weekend, the film raked in another ₹14 crore (US$3 million) nett. Bodyguard netted a total of ₹160.95 crore (US$34.49 million) in India at the end of its run.

=== Overseas ===
Meanwhile, the film grossed a record-breaking 11 lakh (1.1 million) Dirhams on Tuesday, its opening day in Dubai, making it the highest opening day ever.

The film collected $1.25 million in four days, and $1.7 million in six days in the United Arab Emirates.

In the United Kingdom, the film ranked at number 9 in the UK Top 10, and collected an impressive £64,000 on Tuesday, its first day of release, though it was a limited release with screens at only 32 cinemas. On Wednesday, a full release in 51 cinemas raked in £195,000, making it the highest opening day ever for any Indian film, and breaking the box office record for week-day collection set by My Name is Khan. The film grossed £840,000 in six days.

In the North America, the film collected $295,000 on its first day of release, and $3.8 million in four days.

In Australia, the film collected $100,000 in three days, and $250,000 in five days.

In Pakistan, the film collected Rs. 5 million on its first day of release. In the overall overseas market, Bodyguard grossed $3.8 million in four days, while the total collections amounted to $5.25 million over the extended weekend.

As of 4 January 2012, the film has grossed $8.3 million ($14 million in 2020) from all overseas markets.

== Music ==
The film's songs are composed by Himesh Reshammiya along with one song by Pritam Chakraborty while the lyrics are penned by Neelesh Misra and Shabbir Ahmed. The music rights were sold to T-Series for ₹6 crore.

The film score is composed by Sandeep Shirodkar.

The melody of the song "Teri Meri" is reportedly inspired from the very old carols representing spiritual singing of Orthodox Romanian Church tradition, usually sung on Christmas celebrations by many Orthodox Christians (which can be Romanian celebrities, such as Cleopatra Stratan in 2009 or Paula Seling in 2009/ priests in 2008/ or sung by normal people) to express their joy for Christ's birth.

== See also ==
- List of highest-grossing Bollywood films
