= Atul Agnihotri =

Indian film actor, producer and director

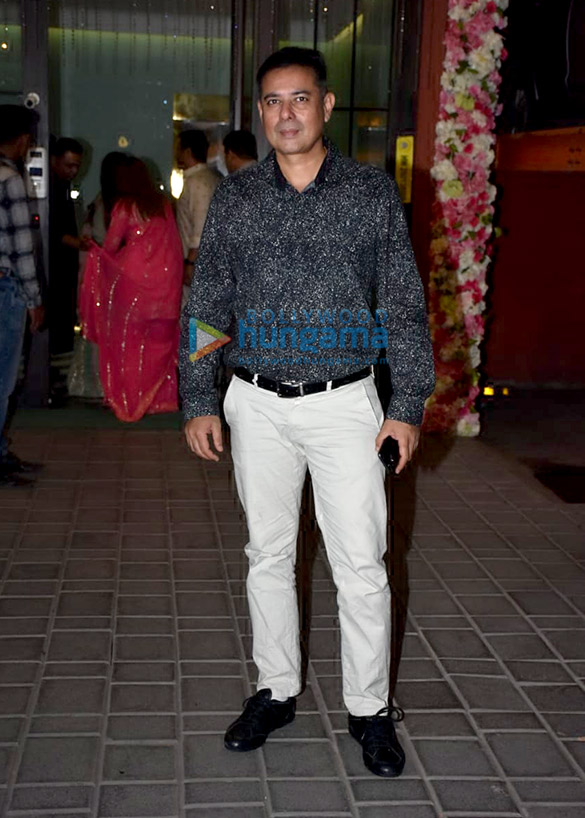
- Born: 10 July 1970 (age 55); Delhi, India
- Occupations: Producer; director; actor
- Years active: 1983, 1993–present
- Spouse: Alvira Khan Agnihotri (m. 1996)
- Children: 2, including Alizeh Agnihotri
- Relatives: Rati Agnihotri (cousin); Tanuj Virwani (nephew); Khan family (in laws)

Atul Agnihotri (born 10 July 1970) is an Indian actor, producer and director. He started his Bollywood career as an actor, went on to direct two films, and found success as a film producer. He is best known for his debut film Sir (1993), which was the most notable film of his career and featured him as the lead protagonist. His other notable films are Aatish: Feel the Fire (1994) and Krantiveer (1994).

== Early and personal life ==
Atul Agnihotri was born into a Punjabi Hindu (Brahmin) family, the son of Rohit Agnihotri, an actor of yesteryears who quit films after a brief stint and later tried his hand at business. Agnihotri lost his father at a young age and the responsibility of supporting his family came upon him. Agnihotri's first cousin is actress Rati Agnihotri, who lived with them in Mumbai for two years and made her entry into films during that time; essentially, this inspired Atul to join films likewise.

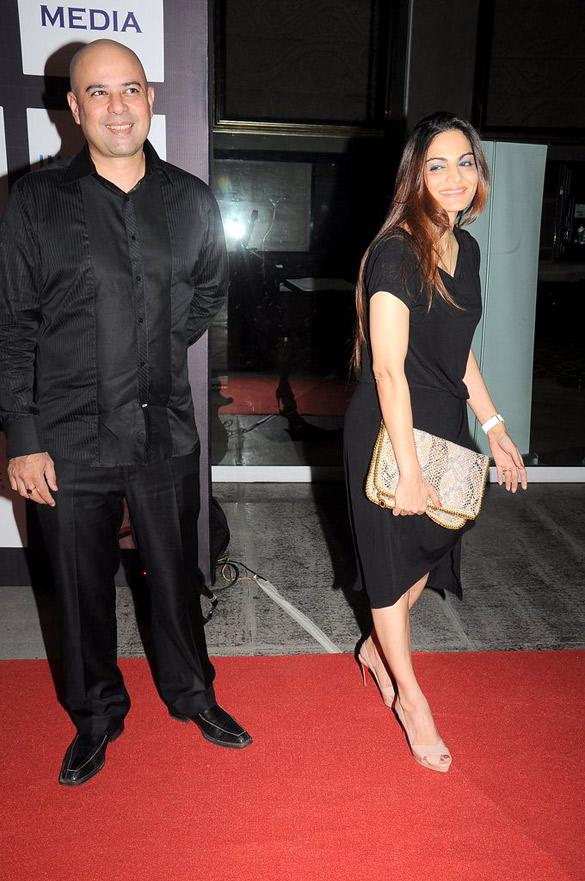
Agnihotri with his wife Alvira Khan Agnihotri, at an event in 2012

Agnihotri is married to producer/designer Alvira Khan Agnihotri. He has a sister as well. His wife is the daughter of scriptwriter Salim Khan and sister of actors Salman Khan, Arbaaz Khan and Sohail Khan. Their first child Ayaan Agnihotri was born on 12 June 1993 and their daughter Alizeh Agnihotri, who became an actress, was born on 21 September 1995.

== Career ==
=== Acting ===
Agnihotri's career stretches back to 1983 when he made a brief appearance as a child artist in Pasand Apni Apni (1983) in which his cousin Rati Agnihotri was the heroine. Inspired by her success, and by the memory of his father's brief stint as an actor, he made his acting debut with Mahesh Bhatt's Sir (1993), which emerged as a commercial and critical success. He went on to act in several other films throughout the 1990s and early 2000s with his most notable hits being Krantiveer (1994), Naaraz (1994), Aatish (1994), Chachi 420 (1997), Yeshwant (1997), and Hum Tumhare Hain Sanam (2002).

=== As film director ===
After being restricted to supporting and second lead roles, Agnihotri abandoned acting and turned to film direction. He made his directorial debut with the 2004 film Dil Ne Jise Apna Kahaa which starred his brother-in-law Salman Khan along with Bhoomika Chawla and Preity Zinta in the lead roles.

Agnihotri persisted with direction, and began work in 2008 on the film Hello. He was both producer and director of this film, which starred his other brother-in-law Sohail Khan, along with Isha Koppikar and Sharman Joshi. The film was released on 10 October 2008 to a poor reception at the box office and proved to be a flop.

=== As film producer ===
Agnihotri's second directorial venture, Hello (2008) had been the first film produced by him. His second film as a producer was Bodyguard, starring his brother-in-law Salman Khan with Kareena Kapoor. The film was directed by Siddique, who is otherwise active in Malayalam cinema and who had directed the original Malayalam version of the same film.

In 2014, Agnihotri produced his next film, O Teri starring relative newcomers Pulkit Samrat, Bilal Amrohi and Sarah Jane Dias. The film was directed by debutant director Umesh Bisht; thus, it gave an opening to a large number of newcomers.

Agnihotris next project was producing Ali Abbas Zafar's Bharat starring Salman Khan, which released on Eid 2019. Bharat was an official adaptation of 2014 Korean film, Ode to My Father which depicted modern Korean history from the 1950s to the present day through the life of an ordinary man. Agnihotri confirmed: "It's the journey of a country and also a person, both of whom go by the name of Bharat."

== Filmography ==
=== As actor ===
- Pasand Apni Apni (1983) – Anil
- Sir (1993) – Karan
- Aatish (1994) – Avi (Baba's Brother)
- Krantiveer (1994) – Atul Dhayal
- Naaraaz (1994) – Ajay Pandit
- Gunehgar (1995) – Rohit
- Veergati (1995) – Shlok
- Bambai Ka Babu (1996) – Amit
- Yeshwant (1997) – Inspector John Frank
- Jeevan Yudh (1997) – Rohit Rai
- Chachi 420 (1997) – Himself (in song "Gare Dore")
- Yeh Aashiqui Meri (1998) – Shekhar Choudhry
- Khote Sikkey (1998) – Rohit
- Hote Hote Pyaar Ho Gaya (1999) – Atul (Bunty)
- Piyo Gayo Pardesh (2000)
- Hum Tumhare Hain Sanam (2002) – Prashant
- Jaani Dushman: Ek Anokhi Kahani (2002) – Man driving red car
- Sanam Teri Kasam (2009) – Gopal
- Vaada Raha (2009) – Suraj Sharma (Cameo)

=== Director ===
- Dil Ne Jise Apna Kahaa (2004)
- Hello (2008)

=== Producer ===
- Hello (2008)
- Bodyguard (2011)
- O Teri (2014)
- Bharat (2019)
- Radhe (2021)
- Farrey (2023)
