= Lavale, Pune =

Village in Maharashtra

Lavale
- village
- Interactive map of Lavale
- Country: India
- State: Maharashtra
- District: Pune

Government
  - Type: Gram panchayat

Languages
  - Official: Marathi
- Time zone: UTC+5:30 (IST)
- Postal code: 412115
- Vehicle registration: MH-12
- Coastline: 0 kilometres (0 mi)

Lavale is a village in Mulshi Taluka on the outskirts of Pune, Maharashtra, India. Lavale hosts the campuses of Symbiosis International University, SUHRC Symbiosis University Hospital & Research Centre, FLAME University, Bharati Vidyapeeth, and Lupin Pharmaceuticals. The village is around 21 km from Pune & 27 km from Pimpri Chinchwad. Lavale is about 14 km from the Rajiv Gandhi IT park.

Lavale Village is known for the cultivation of various crops like onion, rice, jamar, potatoes, and other vegetables. Guava is the most cultivated fruit. The atmosphere of the village and its surroundings is mostly cooler than that of the city. The Mula river passes through this region, and flowing through Wakad and Baner areas as it makes its way to Pune.
