= Alvira Khan Agnihotri =

Indian film producer

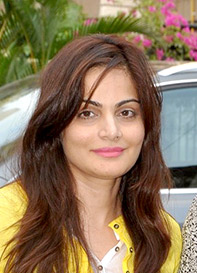
- Agnihotri in 2016
- Born: Alvira Khan
- Occupations: Film producer; fashion designer
- Years active: 1992–present
- Spouse: Atul Agnihotri (m. 1995)
- Children: 2, including Alizeh Agnihotri
- Parent(s): Salim Khan (father); Salma Khan (mother); Helen (step-mother)
- Relatives: Salman Khan (brother); Arbaaz Khan (brother); Sohail Khan (brother)
- Family: Khan family

Alvira Khan Agnihotri (née Khan) is an Indian film producer and fashion designer. In 2016, she received a Stardust Award for Best Costume Design for her work in Sultan.

A part of the Khan family, she is the daughter of dialogue writer and producer Salim Khan, sister of actors Salman Khan, Arbaaz Khan and Sohail Khan, wife of actor-producer Atul Agnihotri and mother of actress Alizeh Agnihotri.

== Career ==
Khan Agnihotri's father, Salim Khan, is a Hindi film screenplay writer. Her elder brother is the actor Salman Khan for whom she has designed outfits for his movie appearances.

She co-produced the 2011 Hindi film Bodyguard. Following a successful collaboration on Bodyguard, Khan Agnihotri made plans with her brother and husband for a film called Sultan. She shared a Stardust Award in 2016 for Best Costume Design with Ashley Rebello for their work on Sultan.

== Personal life ==
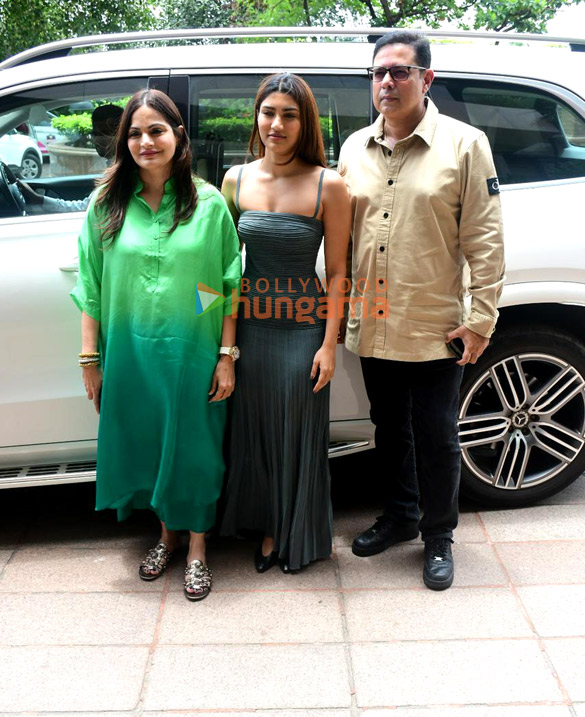
Khan Agnihotri (left), her husband Atul Agnihotri (right) and their daughter Alizeh Agnihotri (mid)

Khan Agnihotri is married to actor-producer Atul Agnihotri. They have two children, daughter Alizeh and son Ayaan. Alizeh acted in the movie Farrey (2023) produced by her family.

== Filmography ==
Year	Title	Credited as
2008	Hello	Producer
2011	Bodyguard	Producer
2012	Ek Tha Tiger	Costume Designer
2014	O Teri	Producer
2016	Sultan	Costume Designer
2017	Tiger Zinda Hai	Costume Designer
2019	Bharat	Producer
2023	Tiger 3	Costume Designer
2023	Farrey	Producer

== Awards ==
- 2016: Stardust Award for Best Costume Design for the film Sultan, shared with Ashley Rebello
