= List of Indian historical novels =

Following is the list of historical novels which are set up on the history of India. This includes the history of the Indian subcontinent, which comprises present-day India, Pakistan and Bangladesh.

== List ==
List of novels
Title	Author	Year	Language	Notes
Anguriyo Binimoy	Bhudev Mukhopadhyay	1862	Bengali	First known historical novel of India.
Doorgeshnondini	Bankim Chandra Chattopadhyay	1865	Bengali	First part of first trilogy in historical novels of India. Set in the backdrop of Pathan-Mughal conflicts in south-western region Paschimbanga during the reign of Akbar.
Kapalkundala	Bankim Chandra Chattopadhyay	1866	Bengali	
Karan Ghelo	Nandshankar Mehta	1866	Gujarati	First Gujarati novel. Depicts story of Karna, the last ruler of the Vaghela dynasty who was defeated by Alauddin Khalji in 1298.
Mrinalini	Bankim Chandra Chattopadhyay	1869	Bengali	
Maharastra Jibanprabhat	Romesh Chandra Datta	1871	Bengali	
Mochangad	Ramchandra Bhikaji Gunjikar	1871	Marathi	First Marathi historical novel. Set in the time of Shivaji's era, it is based on fictitious characters in a fort in Deccan area.
Hambirrav Ani Putalabai	Vishnu Janardan Patvardhan	1873	Marathi	
Bangabijeta	Romesh Chandra Datta	1874	Bengali	
Chandrashekar	Bankim Chandra Chattopadhyay	1875	Bengali	
Dip Nirban	Swarnakumari Debi	1876	Bengali	
Madhabi Kankan	Romesh Chandra Datta	1877	Bengali	
Rajput Jiban Sandhya	Romesh Chandra Datta	1879	Bengali	
Vanaraj Chavdo	Mahipatiram Nilkanth	1881	Gujarati	
Anandamath	Bankim Chandra Chattopadhyay	1882	Bengali	Set in the background of Sannyasi rebellion in the late 18th Century.
Rajsingha	Bankim Chandra Chattopadhyay	1882	Bengali	
Bouthakuranir Hath	Rabindranath Tagore	1883	Bengali	
Debi Chaudhurani	Bankim Chandra Chattopadhyay	1884	Bengali	
Sitaram	Bankim Chandra Chattopadhyay	1887	Bengali	
Suratni Sivaji Ni Loot	Suryaram Desai	1888	Gujarati	
Padmamali	Umesh Chandra Sarkar	1888	Oriya	
Malik-ul-Aziz Varjina	Abdul Halim Sharar	1888	Urdu	
Tipu Sultan	Suryaram Desai	1889	Gujarati	
Hasan Aur Anjalina	Abdul Halim Sharar	1889	Urdu	
Mansur Mohana	Abdul Halim Sharar	1890	Urdu	
Marthandavarma	C. V. Raman Pillai	1891	Malayalam	About the final years of Rama Varma of Venad and successive rule by Marthanda Varma based in circa 1727 – 1732 in Venad kingdom.
Maisuracha Wagh	Hari Narayan Apte	1891	Marathi	Based on Tipu Sultan.
Suryakantha	Lakshman Rao Gadagkar	1892	Kannada	
Mohanangi	T. T. Saravanamuthu Pillai	1895	Tamil	
Sadhara Jesang	Mahipatiram Nilkanth	1896	Gujarati	
Hemalata	Chilakamarti Lakshmi Narasimham	1896	Telugu	
Lakshmi Sundara Vijayamu	Khandavalli Ramachandrarudre	1896	Telugu	
Prataparudriyam	Vedam Venkataraya Shastri	1896	Telugu	
Ushakal	Hari Narayan Apte	1897	Marathi	
Ahalyabhai	Chilakamarti Lakshmi Narasimham	1897	Telugu	Based on Ahilyabai Holkar.
Sundari	Bhai Vir Singh	1898	Punjabi	
Indira Bhai	Gulvadi Venkat Rao	1899	Kannada	
Gad Ala Pan Sinha Gela	Hari Narayan Apte	1899	Marathi	Based on Tanaji Malusare's role in the Battle of Sinhagad of 1670.
Flora Florinda	Abdul Halim Sharar	1899	Urdu	
Umrao Jaan Ada	Mirza Muhammad Hadi Ruswa	1899	Urdu	
Manomati	Rajnikanta Bardoloi	1900	Assamese	
Bijay Singh	Bhai Vir Singh	1900	Punjabi	
Satvant Kaur	Bhai Vir Singh	1900	Punjabi	
Sanjogita	K K Sinha	1901	English	
Anarkali	Baldev Prasad Misra	1902	Hindi	
Nurjahan	Ganga Prasad Gupta	1902	Hindi	
Padmini	T. Ramakrishna	1903	English	
Prithviraj Chauhan	Baldev Prasad Misra	1903	Hindi	
Mangammal	S. Koodalingam Pillai	1903	Tamil	
The Princess Kamala	M. V. Naidu	1904	English	
Raziya Begam	Kishorilal Goswami	1904	Hindi	
Suryoday	Hari Narayan Apte	1906	Marathi	
Sivajino Vaghanakha	Hari Narayan Apte	1907	Marathi	
Suryagrahan	Hari Narayan Apte	1909	Marathi	
Sathiyavalli	Kuzhandaiswamy Pillai	1910	Tamil	
Patan trilogy	Kanaiyalal Maneklal Munshi	1916–1922	Gujarati	deals with the Solanki rule in Gujarat
Kaler Mandira	Sharadindu Bandyopadhyay	1951	Bengali	Based on Hun invasion during Skandagupta's era
GaurMallar	Sharadindu Bandyopadhyay	1954	Bengali	Set in late 7th century Bengal
Ponniyin Selvan	Kalki Krishnamurthy	1955	Tamil	On the early days of Rajaraja I
Tumi Sandhyar Megh	Sharadindu Bandyopadhyay	1958	Bengali	Set in 11th century India. Based on conflict between Pala Empire and Lakshmikarna
Aag Ka Darya	Qurratulain Hyder	1959	Urdu	Indian history from Chandargupta Maurya (4th century BC) to the post-Independence period in India and Pakistan.
Raj Kahini	Abanindranath Tagore	1963	Bengali	Set in Rajputana
Kumarsambhaber Kabi	Sharadindu Bandyopadhyay	1963	Bengali	Based on Kalidasa
Tungabhadrar Teere	Sharadindu Bandyopadhyay	1965	Bengali	Set in Vijaynagar Empire
The Devil's Wind	Manohar Malgonkar	1972	English	On Nana Saheb
Sei Samay	Sunil Gangopadhyay	1981	Bengali	Set in Kolkata from 1840 to 1870. Mainly on Kaliprasanna Singha.
Jolodassu	Sunil Gangopadhyay	1982	Bengali	On Portuguese invasion in Bengal during Aurangzeb's reign
Adhar Rater Atithi	Sunil Gangopadhyay	1983	Bengali	Sequel to Jolodassu
Poorba- Pashchim	Sunil Gangopadhyay	1988	Bengali	On Partition of Bengal of 1947
The Shadow Lines	Amitav Ghosh	1988	English	On Swadeshi movement, Second World War, Partition of India
Shahjada Darasukoh	Shyamal Gangapadhyay	1991	Bengali	On the life of Dara Shukoh
Prothom Alo	Sunil Gangopadhyay	1996	Bengali	On Bengal Renaissance during the second half of 19th century. Mainly on the early years of Rabindranath Tagore and Swami Vivekananda.
Maitreya Jatak	Bani Basu	1999	Bengali	On the life and times of Buddha and Bimbisar
Vanga Danar Pakhi	Suchitra Bhattacharya	1999	Bengali	Set in the background of the rise of the Sena dynasty in Bengal
Moner Manush	Sunil Gangopadhyay	2008	Bengali	On Lalon
Velpari	S. Venkatesan	2018	Tamil	On Vēl Pāri

| Sindhusuta | Sudheer Maurya | 2025 | Hindi | On Arab invasion of Sindh |}

== See also ==
- Historical fiction
- Narrative history
- Historical Romance
- Historical fantasy
- List of historical novels
