= Nirupama Devi =

- Born: Nirupama Devi; 5 May 1883; Berhampore, Bengal Presidency, British Raj
- Died: 7 January 1951 (aged 67)

Nirupama Devi (7 May 1883 – 7 January 1951) was a Bengali novelist and short story writer of the early 20th century from Berhampore in Murshidabad district. She also wrote under the pseudonyms Srimati Devi and Anupama Devi.

== Early life and education ==
Nirupama Devi's father was Nafar Chandra Bhatta who was a judicial employee. Married at the age of ten, and widowed at fourteen, she was educated at home.

Immediately after being widowed, Devi lived with her brother Bibhutibhusan Bhatta in Bhagalpur, where she met Saratchandra Chattopadhyay who went on to become a renowned Bengali author. Chattopadhyay fell in love with Devi, who spurned him, ultimately leading him to leave for Burma.

Devi also met Anurupa Devi, another noted Bengali female author, in Bhagalpur and their mutual encouragement was to grow into a friendship that lasted until her death.

== Work ==
Nirupama Devi was encouraged to write by both Bibhutibhusan Bhatta - himself a litterateur - and Saratchandra Chattopadhyay. Bhatta and his friends put together a hand-written magazine in which Devi's first stories appeared. She used the pseudonym Srimati Devi for them, and later submitted stories under the pseudonym Anupama Devi to the Kuntalin magazine started by Hemendra Mohan Bose. She won the Kuntalin Award in both 1904 and 1905 for two of her stories in the magazine.

When Nirupama Devi wrote her first novel, Annapurnar Mandir, her friend Anurupa Devi sent its manuscript to Swarnakumari Devi, writer and editor. Impressed by it, the latter serialized it in her journal Bharati in 1911-12 to critical and popular acclaim.

== Critical reception ==
In 2013, Swapna Dutta writes for The Hindu that Nirupama Devi was an author who "wrote fearlessly about the social ills of the time: polygamy, forced marriages, dowry-related torture, and the heartbreak of widowhood or of being discarded by the husband for no fault of theirs," "wrote about society’s ruthless attitude to widows who dared to fall in love and, most of all, the utter helplessness of women in a male-dominated world," and "told the stories from a woman's perspective."

== Works ==
Uchchhrinkhal was her first novel. Her other works include:

- Annapurnar Mandir (1913), a same name film was made by Naresh Mitra in 1954.
- Didi (1915)
- Aleya (1917)
- Bidhilipi (1919)
- Shyamali (1919)
- Bandhu (1921)
- Amar Diary (1927)
- Yugantarer Katha (1940)
- Anukarsa (1941)

== Screen adaptations ==
Nirupama Devi's novel Annapurnar Mandir was adapted twice for Tamil films, first in 1941 as Gumasthavin Penn and then in 1974 as Gumasthavin Magal.

Devi's novel Shyamali was adapted for the screen, in Bengali as Shyamali in 1956 and in Tamil as Kodimalar in 1966.

== Awards and honours ==
Nirupama Devi received the 'Bhubanmohini Gold Medal' in 1938 and 'Jagattarini Gold Medal' in 1943 from the University of Calcutta in recognition of her contribution to literature.

== See also ==
- List of Indian writers
