= Chena Achena =

Chena Achena (lit. 'Known Unknowns') may refer to these Indian films:

- Chena Achena (1983 film), a 1983 Bengali film directed by Pinaki Chowdhury
- Chena Achena (1999 film), a 1999 Bengali film directed by Subhas Sen
