= Kovi Manisekaran =

Indian film director (1927–2021)

Kalaimamani Kovi Manisekaran
- Born: 25 May 1927; Salavanpet,North Arcot district, Madras Presidency, British India (now in Vellore district, Tamil Nadu, India)
- Died: 18 November 2021 (aged 94)
- Spouse: Saraswathi
- Children: 5 Daughter's & 3 Son's
- Awards: Sahitya Akademi Award (1992)

Kovi Manisekaran (Tamil: கோவி. மணிசேகரன்; 2 May 1927 – 18 November 2021) was an Indian Tamil scholar, film director and actor. He was awarded Sahitya Akademi Award for Tamil for his historical novel Kutrala Kurinji in 1992.

== Biography ==
Manisekaran was born on 2 May 1927 in Sullivanpet, now (Vellore District), British India. He published for more than 50 years. He wrote eight plays, 29 short story collections, 30 social novels, 50 historical novels and eight essays. He is most noted for his historical novels. He was the recipient of several prestigious awards including the most honourable Sahitya Akademi Award for Tamil for his historical novel Kutrala Kurinji in the year 1992.

== Death ==
Manisekaran died in Chennai on 18 November 2021, at the age of 94.

== Filmography ==
Manisekaran also directed two Tamil and one Kannada film. He was an assistant to noted Tamil film director K. Balachandar for three years. His film Thennangkeetru won the Tamil Nadu film fans association award and the Government of Karnataka's Neerikshe award.

Year	Film	Role	Language	Reference
1975	Thennangkeetru	Director	Tamil & Kannada	
1980	Yagasalai	Director	Tamil	

== Awards ==
- 1992: Awarded Sahitya Akademi Award
- 2011: Received title of Kalaimamani Award by the Government of Tamil Nadu, which is the highest state honour in the field of Arts
- S. P. Adithanar award from Dina Thanthi

== Partial bibliography ==
- Kutrala Kurunji
- Nayakka Madevigal
- Gangai Nachiyar
- Malaya Maarudham
- Therodum Veedhiyilae
- Taj Mahal
- Nithirai Megangal
- Thirisooli
- Varaaga Nadhikarayil
- Kanchi Kathiravan
- Kalayar Kovil Radham
- Karru Veliyidai Kannamma
- Gandhari
- Kollipaavai
- Koduthu sivandha kaigal
- Kudavayil Kottam
- Ilavarasi Mohanangi
- Ajatha Sathru
- Pon Veindha perumaal
- Mani pallavam

== See also ==
- List of Sahitya Akademi Award winners for Tamil
- List of Indian writers
- List of Tamil-language writers
