= Pinaki (given name) =

Pinaki is a given name. Notable people and places with the given name include:

- Pinaki Tutorials (Teachers Consultants), Kanpur Nagar, UP
- Pinaki Chandra Ghose (born 1952), Indian judge
- Pinaki Chaudhuri (born 1940), Indian tabla player, academic, and film director
- Pinaki Majumdar (born 1964), Indian physicist
- Pinaki Misra (born 1959), Indian politician
