= Atmaprakash =

1965 novel by Sunil Gangopadhyay

- Author: Sunil Gangopadhyay
- Language: Bengali
- Genre: Semi-autobiographical
- Publication place: India

Atmaprakash (lit. 'Self Revelation' or 'Emergence') is the 1965 debut novel by Sunil Gangopadhyay, first published in the special Puja issue of Desh. It was largely based on the bohemian lifestyle Sunil led in the 1960s, and he cited Jack Kerouac's writing style as an inspiration.

== See also ==
- Aranyer Din Ratri
