= Nilmanush =

Science fiction stories by Sunil Gangopadhyay

Nilmanush (Bengali: নীলমানুষ; ISO 15919: Nīlamānuṣ; lit. "The Blue Man") is a Bengali juvenile science fiction series of stories written by Sunil Gangopadhyay. It follows the story of Ranajoy, an innocent village youth who was transformed into a blue-skinned man with extraordinary physical strength after an encounter with extraterrestrial beings. The stories chronicle his adventures and the challenges that arise from his transformation.

== Publication History ==
According to the introduction by Swati Gangopadhyay, Sunil Gangopadhyay wrote a series of stories featuring the character Ranajoy, also known as the Blue Man, which were originally published in various Bengali periodicals and magazines. The character subsequently fell out of publication before Ananda Publishers compiled the stories into a single volume, Nilmanush, in 2014 with the aim of reintroducing them to young readers. As of 2025, the book has gone through four printings.

== Plot Summary ==
=== Nil Ronger Manush – "The Blue-Colored Man" ===
The opening story introduces Ranajoy Biswas, a village youth who fishes daily in a river near his home. On one such morning, he witnesses an object explode in the sky and sees a blue-skinned humanoid disappear beneath the river while clutching a spherical device. Although he attempts to rescue the figure, he recovers only the sphere, after which he notices several similar beings departing in a large spherical craft.

Soon afterwards, Ranajoy begins to undergo a mysterious transformation. He grows taller, develops blue skin, and acquires extraordinary physical strength, despite showing no signs of illness. The sphere later becomes active, leading him to realise that the being he had tried to rescue was not dark-skinned, as he had first assumed, but blue-skinned. Intending to seek scientific help, he hides the device, but it is recovered by the extraterrestrials before he can do so.

The aliens take Ranajoy to their spacecraft, where their leader communicates with him through telepathy. He explains that the group comes from the "seventh planet" and that Ranajoy has become one of them after coming into contact with their device. They insist that he accompany them to replace a companion who died on Earth, assuring him that a new family can be created for him on their home planet. Ranajoy refuses to leave his parents and escapes after a struggle aboard the spacecraft by leaping into the river. Although the extraterrestrials pursue him until dawn, they are eventually forced to depart. By the following morning, Ranajoy's transformation into a blue-skinned being is complete.

=== Nil Manusher Kahini – "The Story of the Blue Man" ===
The second story follows Papu, a young boy who enters a field behind his house in search of a lost ball. There, he encounters the blue-skinned Ranajoy, whom he mistakes for a demon. At Ranajoy's request, Papu agrees to call Chitra, whom Ranajoy was expected to marry before his disappearance. Instead, Papu returns home and informs Chitra that a "demon" is asking for her. Although initially skeptical, Chitra ventures into the garden after noticing movement. Ranajoy reveals his identity, causing her to faint. Papu then alerts his family, prompting Chitra's mother, uncle, and several villagers to pursue Ranajoy. Chitra regains consciousness during the commotion, and Ranajoy escapes into the nearby forest. His appearance gives rise to rumors throughout Nishanpur village, where he is variously believed to be a demon, an ape, or another supernatural being. Only Chitra's mother suspects that the mysterious figure may in fact be Ranajoy.

Living in hiding, Ranajoy struggles to survive as he is rejected by his family because of his transformed appearance and continues to be pursued by the extraterrestrials responsible for his condition. Hunger eventually forces him to enter a neighbouring village in search of food. Unable to bring himself to steal despite his desperation, he breaks into an apparently deserted house and cooks a meal. While there, he encounters two burglars attempting to rob the house. Although one of the thieves stabs him in the chest, his altered physiology renders the injury harmless, allowing him to overpower and tie up both men. Before leaving, Ranajoy leaves a note for the homeowners explaining that he had eaten their food but had protected their property in return, signing it simply as the "Blue Man."

=== Nil Manusher Dukkho – "The Blue Man's Sorrow" ===
The third story depicts Ranajoy's growing isolation following his transformation. Now twice the height of an ordinary human and completely blue in appearance, he hides in the forest while lamenting the loss of his former life. When a police search party discovers him, the officers mistake him for a dangerous creature. Although Ranajoy repeatedly tries to convince them that he is still human and even asks them to kill him rather than capture him, his altered voice renders his speech unintelligible. Before the police can apprehend him, the extraterrestrials reappear in their spherical spacecraft, forcing both Ranajoy and the officers to flee. Ranajoy escapes by diving into a nearby river, while the aliens abandon their pursuit at dawn.

Unable to return home, Ranajoy wanders from place to place in search of food and shelter. His increasing appetite and immense physical strength compel him to steal food, clothing and money for survival, acts that fill him with guilt as he resolves to repay those he has stolen from if he ever regains his human form. Eventually, he reaches a nearby town and secretly checks into a hotel, where he learns from newspaper reports that his existence has become a national sensation. Scientists from India and abroad seek to study him, while the authorities continue their search for the mysterious "Blue Man."

Convinced that scientific intervention offers his only hope of returning to normal, Ranajoy writes to the police, offering to surrender voluntarily and insisting that he poses no threat to anyone. Before the authorities can reach him, however, the extraterrestrials locate him once again and abduct him aboard their spherical spacecraft. As they leave Earth behind, Ranajoy notices that the extraterrestrial holding him suddenly recoils from his tears. He realizes that the aliens are afraid not only afraid of waterbodies but also tears and concludes that while he may be leaving earth for another planet, he has one last weapon left.

=== Nil Manusher Deshe – "In the Land of the Blue Man" ===
The fourth story follows Ranajoy after he is abducted by the extraterrestrials and taken to their home planet. During the journey, he learns that the aliens fear water, making his tears physically harmful to them. Upon arriving, he discovers that their civilisation is entirely underground beneath a barren, desert-like surface. The city consists of circular buildings and advanced technology, with humanoid robots performing most domestic and industrial tasks. Although Ranajoy is told that he is free to move about the city, he is repeatedly denied his request to return to Earth. He also discovers that the planet has no water, and that his thirst is instead relieved by a mysterious blue light that periodically illuminates the city.

The extraterrestrial leader eventually escorts Ranajoy to a laboratory, where scientists reveal that they wish to study his tears and hair. They explain that their ancestors once possessed hair and eyebrows, and hope that examining Ranajoy's transformed body will help them recover these lost characteristics. When they refuse to return him to Earth, insisting that he is no longer human, Ranajoy attempts to resist but is overpowered. He soon realises that the planet's lack of water has begun affecting his own body, causing his hair to fall out and leaving him unable to produce saliva. This realisation causes him to faint.

Upon gaining consciousness, Ranajoy flees the laboratory and eventually hides aboard an unmanned spacecraft piloted by a humanoid robot. Unable to control the vessel, he inadvertently alters its course while attempting to operate its controls. The spacecraft eventually reaches a green planet, which Ranajoy initially mistakes for Earth. Believing that the craft is about to crash, he jumps out into the atmosphere and lands safely in a forest. He soon discovers that the planet is unlike Earth: its vegetation regenerates instantly, the ground appears to be alive, and even its butterflies shatter like glass on impact. Overcome with despair, he starts crying and realizes that he can cry again.

=== Bhooter Deshe Nil Manush – "The Blue Man in the Land of Ghosts" ===
The fifth story follows Ranajoy after his arrival on a mysterious forested planet inhabited by unusual flora and fauna. While searching for food and water, he discovers that the planet's vegetation is sentient and hostile: trees attack living creatures, while even seemingly ordinary insects and plants display unusual characteristics. After narrowly escaping the animated forest, Ranajoy reaches an abandoned-looking settlement where he hears disembodied voices but encounters no visible inhabitants.

He eventually meets a zebra-striped humanoid who, after making physical contact with Ranajoy, acquires the ability to speak Bengali. The inhabitant explains that a meteorite strike caused the planet's trees to become animate and wage war against all forms of animal life. Unable to defeat the regenerating trees, the planet's inhabitants developed a substance that gradually renders their bodies invisible, allowing them to survive without attracting the trees or requiring food. Although the zebra-striped humanoid offers to make Ranajoy invisible as well, he declines. He leaves the house, determined to live the rest of his days on turtle eggs and rainbow-fish.

Later, Ranajoy discovers the abandoned spacecraft that had brought him to the planet and finds its robotic pilot inoperative. As the living trees begin attacking the spacecraft, he frantically operates its controls and succeeds in launching it into space, escaping the planet.

=== Shei Ekla Nil Manush – "That Lonely Blue Man" ===
The sixth story follows Ranajoy as he drifts alone through space aboard the stolen spacecraft. Unable to operate or navigate the vessel, he worries about its limited fuel and the absence of food. While searching the spacecraft, he discovers a communication device through which he receives incomprehensible transmissions from an unknown source. Shortly afterwards, his spacecraft is intercepted by another vessel carrying a group of diminutive extraterrestrials.

Initially, the aliens attack Ranajoy with energy weapons before their queen intervenes. Using a silver spherical translation device, she communicates with him in Bengali and explains that her people regard him as the fulfilment of an ancient prophecy describing a blue-skinned, giant deity with hair. Believing his arrival to be a sign of good fortune, they welcome him with food and invite him to accompany them to their home planet.

Ranajoy agrees to visit the planet but soon discovers that its atmosphere lacks oxygen because of the absence of vegetation, making it impossible for him to survive without life-support equipment. Conversely, when the extraterrestrials accompany him to Earth, they find its oxygen-rich atmosphere unbreathable. So, he told them to return to their own planet and said that he will go to them when it is time with no intention of leaving earth ever again.

=== Nil Manush O Chotto Bondhu – "The Blue Man and the Little Friend" ===
The seventh story introduces Paresh Chandra Maity, nicknamed Gutli, a man with dwarfism who is ridiculed throughout his life because of his short stature despite his intelligence and abilities. After losing his mother, Gutli finds work as a cashier at a grocery shop but is falsely implicated in a robbery after thieves drug him and loot the shop. Unable to prove his innocence, he is driven out of the village and retreats to a forest, hoping to obtain a divine blessing through penance that will make him taller.

In the forest, Gutli encounters Ranajoy, whom he initially mistakes for a deity because of his towering height and blue complexion. Ranajoy explains that he is an ordinary human transformed by extraterrestrials. Realising the irony of their circumstances—Gutli being mocked for his short stature and Ranajoy ostracised for his extraordinary height—the two become close friends and decide to help one another overcome the prejudice they face.

Later, Gutli disguises himself as a Hindu ascetic using robes and a trident found in an abandoned temple and settles near a cremation ground, where his unusual appearance and austere behaviour attract the attention of local villagers. His growing reputation also draws the interest of another ascetic, who attempts to intimidate Gutli and establish authority over him. Pretending to comply, Gutli summons Ranajoy from the nearby forest. Confronted by the towering Blue Man, the ascetic confesses that he is in fact Raghu Sardar, a dacoit posing as a priest to evade the police. Ranajoy and Gutli forgive him after his confession, and the two friends resolve to continue working together to seek the forgiveness of every single wrongdoer.

=== Nil Manusher Sansar – "The Blue Man's Household" ===
The eighth story centres on the unconventional household established by Ranajoy and Gutli in the forest. Their companion Raghu Sardar, the former dacoit who had disguised himself as a priest, serves as their cook while completing the one-year period of reform imposed by Gutli. Although Raghu resents his new role and repeatedly contemplates escape, he remains with them out of fear of Ranajoy's immense strength.

When Gutli sends Raghu to buy betel leaves from a roadside shop run by Damodar, the man responsible for Gutli's wrongful accusation in the grocery shop robbery, Raghu sees the errand as an opportunity to flee. At the shop, he also encounters Bald Gulguli, one of Damodar's associates, and briefly considers joining them. Before he can escape, however, Ranajoy and Gutli intercept him after capturing Damodar and Bald Gulguli, whose attempt to attack Ranajoy had failed because of his extraordinary physique.

Ranajoy reminds Damodar of his betrayal of Gutli, prompting him to confess and apologise. Rather than inflicting a harsh punishment, Ranajoy and Gutli compel Raghu, Damodar, and Bald Gulguli to punish one another in a deliberately comic manner before sentencing them to a year of labour in the forest. Their duties include cooking for the group and digging a pond for the benefit of wild animals. The story concludes with Ranajoy humorously remarking that their "household" has unexpectedly grown larger.

=== Nil Manusher Mon Kharap – "The Blue Man's Melancholy" ===
The ninth story depicts Ranajoy's growing dissatisfaction with his secluded life in the forest. Although he lives peacefully with Gutli and the three reformed dacoits, he longs to return to human society, watch films and theatrical performances, play football, and interact with other people. Gutli reminds him that his towering height and blue complexion make it impossible for him to appear in public without frightening others.

To cheer him up, Gutli arranges a football match in the forest between Ranajoy and the three former dacoits. However, Ranajoy's extraordinary strength makes it impossible to continue the game, as he bursts footballs and accidentally injures Raghu while attempting to play gently. Deeply disappointed, Ranajoy falls into despair, refusing to eat and spending his days weeping beneath a tree.

Determined to lift his friend's spirits, Gutli devises another plan. He stops a passing football team on the highway and persuades them to play a friendly match against the three dacoits in the forest. Ranajoy watches the game from a distance, cheering enthusiastically without revealing himself. During the second half, unable to resist any longer, he joins the match. The footballers, terrified by the sudden appearance of the gigantic blue man, immediately faint. Despite the abrupt end to the game, Ranajoy is delighted to have taken part in football once again and happily clears the roadblocks so that the team can continue their journey.

=== Nil Manusher Porajoy – "The Blue Man's Defeat" ===
The tenth story begins after an unseasonal storm and earthquake force Ranajoy, Gutli and Raghu to leave their cave and take shelter in an open field. The following morning, they encounter two identical girls named Rumona and Jhumona, who claim to be travelling through the forest. Unlike other humans, the girls show no fear of Ranajoy and display several unusual abilities, including surviving on flowers and pond water, befriending wild animals, walking effortlessly up the trunk of a tree, and restraining Ranajoy without any visible force. Gradually, Ranajoy realises that they are extraterrestrials visiting Earth to study its flowers during a holiday.

Although Gutli urges him to avoid provoking them, Ranajoy repeatedly attempts to demonstrate his own strength and outwit the girls, only to find that they effortlessly counter his actions. Before the encounter can continue, Raghu betrays the group by leading the police to their hiding place. As the policemen attempt to take Rumona and Jhumona away by force, the girls incapacitate them, mistaking them for criminals. During the ensuing confusion, Ranajoy is shot in the chest while trying to protect Gutli and seize a policeman's revolver.

The girls carry Ranajoy and Gutli into the sky, heal Ranajoy's wound with their saliva, and revive him by blowing into his eyes. Before leaving, they decide to play one final trick by sending the two friends flying across the oceans on a cloud. Accepting that he has been outmatched in their contest of tricks, Ranajoy happily admits defeat.

=== Ranajoy-er Sohor Abhijan – "Ranajoy's Expedition to the City" ===
The eleventh story follows Ranajoy's renewed longing to return to the city and experience ordinary human life. Tired of living in the forest, he expresses his desire to watch films and football matches and enjoy simple pleasures such as tea and samosas. Gutli initially tries to console him by offering to bring these things from the city, but eventually agrees to accompany him. The two stop a passing truck on the highway that runs through the forest and persuade its Sikh driver to take them to the city. During the journey, Ranajoy fulfils his wish of driving a truck for the first time and resolves to earn an honest living so that he can buy clothes and shoes made to fit his unusual size.

Upon reaching the city, the truck driver introduces them to the owner of a petrol pump, who offers them food and temporary shelter in return for work. The owner, who also runs a cinema hall, arranges a late-night screening exclusively for Ranajoy and Gutli. However, while Ranajoy is engrossed in the film, the owner and an accomplice betray him by tying him up with the intention of exhibiting him in the circus as a rare attraction. Gutli escapes their pursuit but is apparently shot while trying to evade capture. Enraged, Ranajoy breaks free, overpowers his captors, and believes Gutli to be dead, only to discover that the bullet had missed him and that he had feigned death to avoid further danger.

Outside the cinema hall, a crowd gathers after learning of Ranajoy's presence. In spite of his attempts to explain that he is an ordinary human being despite his appearance, the crowd attacks him with bricks and stones, injuring Gutli in the process. Realizing that he can never be accepted by society, Ranajoy abandons the confrontation and returns to the forest with Gutli. Before giving up entirely, he makes one final attempt to visit his family, but when his young nephew faints at the sight of him, he quietly leaves, accepting that he no longer has a place among human beings.

=== Ajob Lorai – "The Strange Battle" ===
The twelfth story opens with Ranajoy awakening to find himself bound by thin blue threads that tighten painfully whenever he struggles. He soon discovers that he has once again been captured by the blue extraterrestrials from the Seventh Planet. Along with various animals collected from Earth, he is taken aboard their spacecraft, where he finds Gutli already imprisoned. The spacecraft resembles a zoo, housing numerous live animals kept calm by a sweet, mysterious vapour. Ranajoy also recognises the female extraterrestrial who had guarded him during his earlier captivity and unsuccessfully attempts to persuade her to let him remain on Earth.

As the spacecraft prepares for departure, one of the extraterrestrials is instructed to hold Ranajoy's injured hand. He notices that the sweat and blood on his hand burn the alien's skin, leading him to realize that the extraterrestrials are vulnerable to liquids. Exploiting this weakness, he incapacitates several of them by spitting at them. When the female extraterrestrial threatens him with a powerful blue sphere capable of melting metal, Gutli attacks her by spitting at her from behind. Ranajoy then overpowers her in the same manner, and the two friends escape from the spacecraft moments before it takes off.

=== Iccha Groho – "The Wish Planet" ===
The thirteenth story begins with Gutli expressing his desire to eat ice cream. Since it is unavailable in the nearby villages and neither he nor Ranajoy wishes to return to the city after their previous experiences, they decide to make it themselves. That night, they take some sweets and milk from a village sweet shop, leaving fruits behind in exchange as they have no money. They then travel to the snow-capped mountains beyond the forest to collect ice. While preparing the ice cream, Ranajoy notices blocks of snow disappearing one after another. On investigating, he discovers a giant robotic arm collecting the snow and loading it into a distant spacecraft. Before they can react, the robotic arm seizes Ranajoy and Gutli and throws them into the spacecraft, causing them to lose consciousness.

They awaken on a strange planet beneath a slate-black sky, unable to remember their names, where they have come from, or even how to eat properly. The planet has no visible inhabitants, although they occasionally notice glowing eyes and vehicles moving without visible drivers. As the days pass, they realise that they are gradually losing their memories. While idly tracing Bengali letters on the ground, they begin to recall familiar words. Whenever they remember and utter the name of an object, such as a heron or a forest, it appears before them. Eventually, they remember Earth, and a forest materialises around them.

At that moment, a deafening sound shakes the ground and they lose consciousness again. When they awaken, they find themselves back in the mountains where the milk is still boiling over the fire, as though no time has passed. They are left uncertain whether their experience had been real. The unexpected presence of a matchbox, despite neither of them having wished for one, suggests that the adventure may have been an illusion, while the unfamiliar soil still clinging to Ranajoy's hand suggests that they had indeed visited the mysterious planet.

=== Nil Manusher Khela – "The Blue Man's Game" ===
The fourteenth story follows twin sisters Hashi and Khushi, who spot Ranajoy while travelling through a forest with their parents. Although their father initially dismisses the sighting, he soon discovers that Ranajoy is preventing the car from moving forward by holding it from behind. After learning that Ranajoy is a Bengali, he listens as Ranajoy briefly recounts how he became the Blue Man. The twins ask to hear the full story but, pressed for time, settle for a photograph instead. Before they can leave, Ranajoy notices the approach of Hukum Singh's gang and retreats into the forest.

The gang soon stops the family's car and attempts to rob them. Before the dacoits can carry out the robbery, nooses thrown from the forest tighten around their necks, while Gutli emerges to disarm them by throwing away their rifles. As one of the dacoits attempts to escape, Gutli leaps into the air and kicks him back. At Khushi's request, Ranajoy leaves the punishment to Gutli, who makes the defeated dacoits carry him on their backs like horses before releasing them. The family then resumes their journey after thanking Ranajoy and Gutli for rescuing them.

=== Prithibi te Nil Manush – "The Blue Man on Earth" ===
The final story opens with Ranajoy being abducted once again by the blue extraterrestrials while asleep. Before they can leave Earth, however, their spacecraft explodes in the atmosphere. Ranajoy survives the explosion, falls into a river, and regains consciousness, uncertain whether he is still on Earth. After encountering Burmese villagers and recognizing the city of Prome from English signboards and a pagoda, he realizes that he has landed in Burma. Forced to avoid people because of his appearance, he survives by taking food whenever he can. While passing through the city one night, he intervenes in an armed robbery by overpowering three gunmen and rescuing an injured shopkeeper before returning to the forest.

Determined to return home, Ranajoy travels towards India on foot, hiding in forests during the day and walking at night. Along the way, he survives several dangers, including an encounter with a python, and eventually crosses into India. In Assam, he meets the manager of a tea estate, who offers him food, shelter, and a bed after hearing his story. The manager, however, secretly drugs him with spiked juice, binds him with nylon ropes, and plans to present him as an alien in order to claim credit for his discovery and exhibit him in a zoo. When the police arrive, Ranajoy pretends to cry so that he can chew through his restraints, persuades the police to untie his legs, and escapes before the manager can stop him.

Eleven days later, Ranajoy finally returns to his village and reveals himself to his widowed mother from the shadows, explaining that although his appearance and voice have changed, he is still her son. The story ends with his mother accepting him and giving him shelter, marking their long-awaited reunion.

== Legacy ==
Although Nilmanush is not among Sunil Gangopadhyay's best-known works, it has had a lasting presence in Bengali children's literature. Since 2017, "Nil Manusher Kahini" ("The Blue Man's Story"), the second story in the series, has been included in the Bengali syllabus for the Indian Certificate of Secondary Education (ICSE) examinations. The first three stories of the series were adapted into a Sunday Suspense radio drama broadcast by Mirchi Bangla on 16 June 2024.
