= Thennangkeetru =

- Title card of Thennangkeetru
- Directed by: Kovi Manisekaran
- Written by: Kovi Manisekaran
- Based on: Thennangkeetru by Kovi Manisekaran
- Produced by: Baba Desai
- Starring: Sujatha; Vijayakumar; Kalpana; Srinath; Manjula
- Cinematography: D. Rajagopalan
- Edited by: E. V. Shanmugam
- Music by: G. K. Venkatesh
- Production company: Goodwin Enterprises
- Release dates: 4 July 1975 (Tamil); 14 August 1975 (Kannada)
- Country: India
- Languages: Tamil; Kannada

Thennangkeetru (transl. Coconut leaflet) is a 1975 Indian Tamil-language drama film written by Kovi Manisekaran in his directorial debut. It is based on his novel of the same name, and was simultaneously shot in Kannada as Nireekshe ( transl. Expectation). The film stars Sujatha, Vijayakumar and Kalpana. Manjula and Srinath replace Sujatha and Vijayakumar, respectively, in the Kannada version. Thennangkeetru was released on 4 July 1975, and Nireekshe on 14 August the same year.

== Cast ==
Actor (Tamil)	Actor (Kannada)	Role
Sujatha	Manjula	Vasumathi
Vijayakumar	Srinath	Sampath
Kalpana		Malini
Typist Gopu	Shivaram	
Oru Viral Krishna Rao		Coconut seller

Tamil

- Senthamarai
- Jai Ganesh as Chandru

== Production ==
Thennangkeetru, directed by Kovi Manisekaran, is based on his novel of the same name, and his directorial debut. It was simultaneously shot in Kannada as Nireekshe.

== Soundtrack ==
The music was composed by G. K. Venkatesh.

Tamil
No.	Title	Lyrics	Singer(s)	Length
1.	"Aandavan Potta"	Kandanur	K. J. Yesudas
2.	"Manjalum Vaazhga"	Kannadasan	P. Susheela
3.	"Kaalangale"	Kannadasan	T. M. Soundararajan
4.	"Maanikka Maamani"	Kannadasan	S. P. Balasubrahmanyam, Vani Jairam

Kannada
No.	Title	Singer(s)	Length
1.	"Arisina Yoga Kumkuma Yoga"	S. Janaki
2.	"Baalina Guriya Seruva Pariya"
3.	"Haraikeya Pooraiseya" (sad)
4.	"Haraikeya Pooraiseya" (happy)

== Release and reception ==
Thennangkeetru was released on 4 July 1975, and Nireekshe on 14 August. Kanthan of Kalki wrote the film tries to be away from formula but its a complete disappointment as the basic plot appears to be weak and noted the film had too many unbelievable twists and he was shocked this was written by Manisekaran and concluded saying throughout this film it feels proud to see a writer making his directorial debut in films and added the writer-turned-director left his old career behind when he fulfilled his new role well. Kumudam wrote Manisekaran's innovation in taking up a different subject cannot but be welcomed. Even if he is not completely successful in directing and scripting, he has set his mind that he wants to make a film like this and has worked hard to achieve it with all his heart. While Nireekshe was a success, Thennangkeetru was not, as it ran for four weeks in theatres, although it won the Tamil Nadu Film Fans' Association Award.
