= Gumasthavin Penn =

1941 film directed by B. N. Rao

- Theatrical release poster
- Directed by: B. N. Rao
- Story by: Nirupama Devi
- Starring: T. K. Shanmugam; T. K. Bhagavathi; M. V. Rajamma
- Cinematography: Rustom M. Irani
- Production companies: TKS Brothers; Murthi Films
- Distributed by: Gemini Pictures Circuit
- Release date: 10 May 1941
- Running time: 183 minutes
- Country: India
- Language: Tamil

Gumasthavin Penn (English: Clerk's Daughter) is a 1941 Indian Tamil-language romance film directed by B. N. Rao. It is an adaptation of the play Gumasthavin Magal, itself based on Nirupama Devi's Bengali novel Annapurnar Mandir. The film was released on 10 May 1941 and became a success.

== Plot ==
Seetha and Sarasa are sisters. Their father Ramaswami, a clerk working under the wealthy philanderer Mani, is unable to get them married. Ramu, another wealthy man in the same village, opposes marriage as it would interfere with his reformist ideals. Ramu's mother wants him to marry Seetha. He refuses, so a desperate Ramaswami gets Seetha married to a much older man. Seetha becomes a widow soon after. Mani tries to rape her one-day, but Ramu saves her. Traumatised and depressed, Seetha commits suicide. Feeling he is responsible for her demise, Ramu decides to arrange Sarasa's marriage. When the bridegroom and his family back out due to an argument regarding dowry, Ramu marries Sarasa.

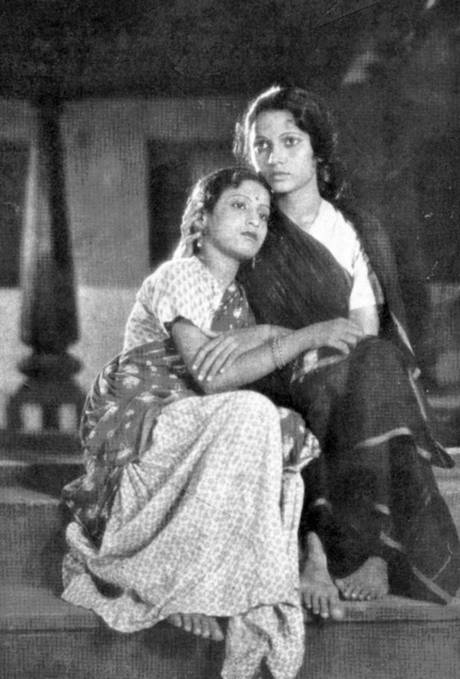
A scene from the fim showing M. V. Rajamma and M. S. Draupadhi

== Cast ==
Adapted from The Hindu:

- T. K. Shanmugam as Ramu
- T. K. Bhagavathi as Mani
- M. V. Rajamma as Seetha
- K. R. Ramasamy as V. P. Var
- M. S. Draupadhi as Sarasa
- ‘Friend’ Ramasami as Seetha's husband
- Subbaiah Pillai as Ramaswami

== Production ==
Gumasthavin Magal was a Tamil play staged by TKS Brothers, based on Nirupama Devi's Bengali novel Annapurnaar Mandir. Following its critical and commercial success, TKS Brothers decided to adapt it as a film with the title Gumasthavin Penn, co-producing it with Murthi Films financed by S. S. Vasan under his banner Gemini Pictures Circuit. B. N. Rao was hired as director, Rustom M. Irani as the cinematographer, and Panju (who later gained fame as one half of the Krishnan–Panju director duo) as assistant director. The name of K. R. Ramasamy's character V. P. Var, was the reverse of the name of director P. V. Rao.

== Soundtrack ==
The soundtrack was composed by Narayanan and Padmanabhan Party. The song "Paarai Maanida", sung by P. G. Venkatesan, attained popularity.

== Release and reception ==
Gumasthavin Penn was released on 10 May 1941, and was distributed by Vasan through Gemini. The film was commercially successful, leading to youngsters "raising their voices wherever girls were being married to old men as second or third wives".

== Adaptation ==
A. P. Nagarajan, who portrayed a female character in the play, directed the remake of this film, Gumasthavin Magal in 1974.
