= September on Jessore Road =

Poem by Allen Ginsberg

"September on Jessore Road" is a poem by American poet and activist Allen Ginsberg, inspired by the plight of the East Bengali refugees from the 1971 Bangladesh Liberation War. Ginsberg wrote it after visiting the refugee camps along the Jessore Road in Bangladesh. The poem documents the sickness and squalor he witnessed there and attacks the United States government's indifference to the humanitarian crisis. It was first published in The New York Times on November 14, 1971. Further to topical songs by George Harrison and Joan Baez, the poem helped ensure that the Bangladesh crisis became a key issue for the youth protest movement around the world.

Ginsberg debuted "September on Jessore Road" in a poetry recitation in New York City before performing it with improvised musical accompaniment in a PBS television special. In November 1971, he recorded it with musicians including Bob Dylan for a proposed album release on Apple Records. The recording first became widely available on the 1994 Ginsberg box set Holy Soul Jelly Roll: Poems and Songs 1949–1993. The poem is displayed in English and Bengali at the Liberation War Museum in Dhaka.

== Background and inspiration ==
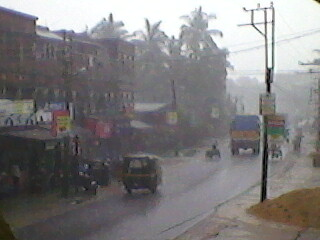
Monsoon conditions on the Jessore Road at Barasat, West Bengal (pictured in 2011)

The Jessore Road (about 108 kilometres (67 mi) long) was an important road connecting Bangladesh with West Bengal in India. The road was used by refugees during the 1971 Bangladesh Liberation War and the Bangladesh genocide to move to safety in India. Between March and December 1971, between 8 and 10 million refugees poured over the border, seeking refuge in Calcutta. Their exodus was further hindered by torrential rains and flooding in the region, and their makeshift camps became rife with disease, including cholera.

Ginsberg's "September on Jessore Road" was one of several examples of artists voicing their support for the refugees' cause following George Harrison's charity single "Bangla Desh" and Ravi Shankar's Joi Bangla EP, both released on Apple Records in July–August 1971. During the Liberation War, the United States government under president Richard Nixon was an ally of Pakistan, although liberals such as Senator Edward Kennedy were vocal in their support of Bangladesh (formerly East Pakistan). Reports emerged that the US was providing the Pakistani Army under General Yahya Khan with financial aid and weapons. Ginsberg became aware of the refugees' suffering through the reports of foreign correspondents.

Ginsberg visited India in September, having become friends with a group of West Bengali radicals on a previous visit to the country. On September 9, he traveled with poet Sunil Gangopadhyay from Calcutta along the Jessore Road toward Bangaon, on the border with East Pakistan. He was alarmed to learn from an aid worker that food was distributed just once a week in the camp there. Documenting his observations on a tape recorder, he also reported on the heavy rain, the cholera epidemic, and resentment between locals and the refugees.

After returning to the US, Ginsberg wrote "September on Jessore Road", drawing inspiration from the suffering he witnessed in the camps. The poem details his journey along Jessore Road, the lines of refugees traveling to Calcutta, and the starvation and sickness he encountered in the camps, particularly among the children. Like Joan Baez's "Song for Bangladesh", which Baez began performing in concert in late July 1971, Ginsberg's verses deplore the apathy shown by the US toward the crisis. He contrasts the lack of US military assistance for the Bangladeshis with his country's preoccupation with "Bombing North Laos" and "Napalming North Vietnam". The poem concludes with a demand that "tongues of the world" and "voices for love" resonate "in the conscious American brain".

== Performance and publication ==
Ginsberg first recited "September on Jessore Road" in a poetry recitation held at St. George's Episcopal Church in New York City. He also included the poem in a PBS television special filmed in New York on October 30, 1971, when he performed it with improvised musical accompaniment, led by himself on harmonium. Among his backing musicians was Bob Dylan, who had performed with Harrison, Shankar and other artists at the Concert for Bangladesh shows at Madison Square Garden on August 1.

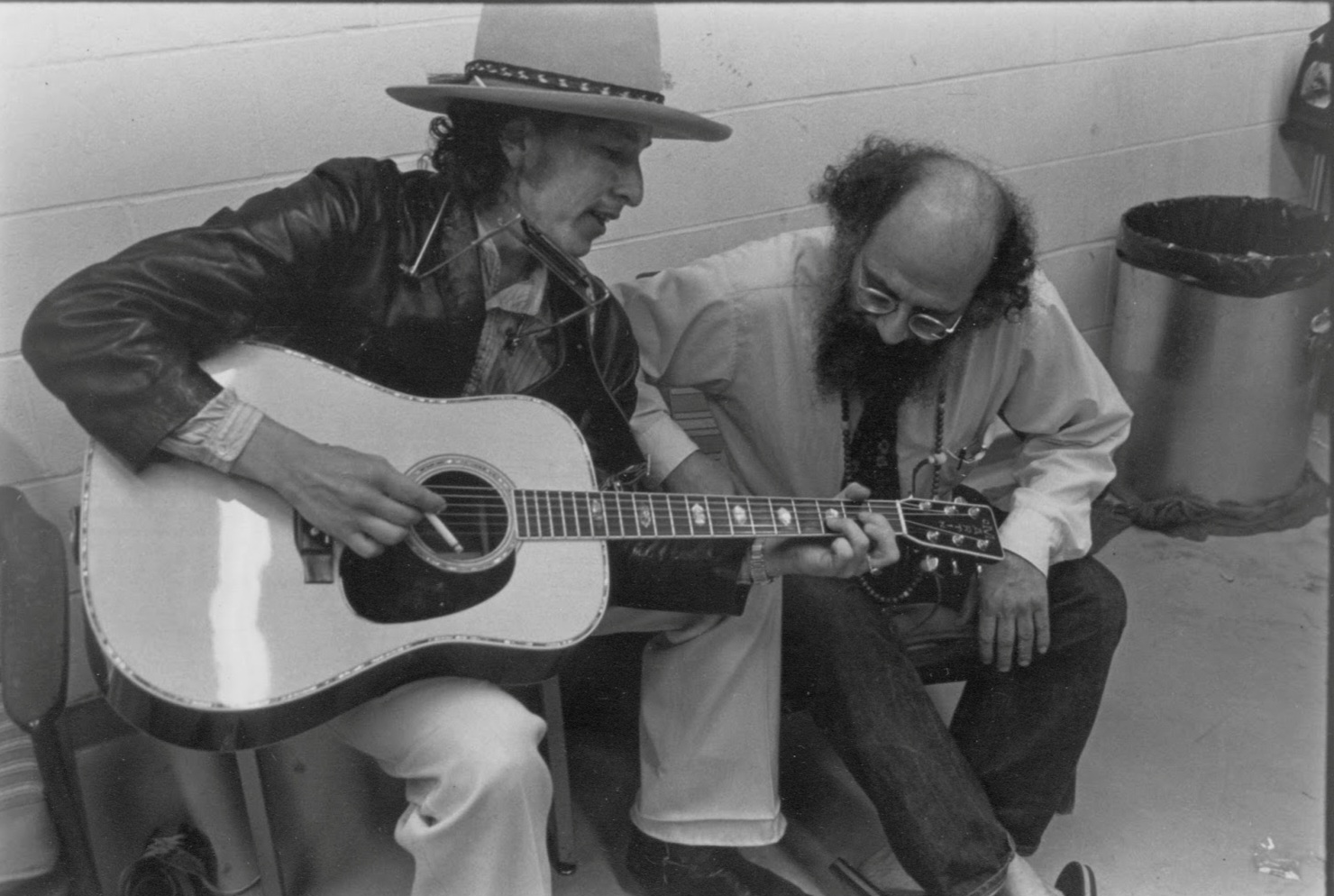
Bob Dylan (left) and Ginsberg in 1975, four years after they collaborated on a musical adaptation of "September on Jessore Road". Photo: Elsa Dorfman.

Following the PBS special, Ginsberg and Dylan recorded their musical adaptation of "September on Jessore Road". It was part of a proposed collaborative album on Apple Records, titled Holy Soul & Jelly Roll, the sessions for which took place over three days in November at the Record Plant in New York and were paid for by Ginsberg. The other musicians included Dylan associates David Amram and Happy Traum. The latter recalled the recording sessions as being "a very loose happening—as usual when Allen organizes something". Although John Lennon was keen for Apple to issue the album, the release did not take place.

The New York Times published the poem on November 14. As with the topical songs by Harrison and Baez, according to Indian historian Srinath Raghavan, "September on Jessore Road" resonated in the West and helped ensure that the Bangladesh crisis became a key issue for the youth protest movement around the world. Ginsberg recited the poem with guitar backing when he opened the John Sinclair Freedom Rally, held at the University of Michigan on December 10 and headlined by Lennon and Yoko Ono.

Singer Moushumi Bhowmik recorded a musical rendition of the poem in Bengali. The Ginsberg–Dylan recording appeared on flexi-discs accompanying issues of Sing Out! magazine in 1972. It was subsequently included on the Ginsberg compilation album Holy Soul Jelly Roll: Poems and Songs 1949–1993, released in 1994 on Rhino Entertainment's WordBeat label. In 1983, Ginsberg recorded the poem in Amsterdam with backing from the Mondrian String Quartet, for Dutch impresario Benn Posset's One World Poetry project. According to Ginsberg, this musical setting was in keeping with Lennon's suggestion in 1971 that he should "treat it like 'Eleanor Rigby' with a string quartet".

== Legacy ==
Reviewing the poetry collection A Lifelong Poem Including History for The New Yorker in 1986, literary critic Helen Vendler cited "September on Jessore Road" as an example of Ginsberg's persistence in protesting against "imperial politics" and "persecution of the powerless". Ginsberg biographer Deborah Baker has dismissed it as a "terrible poem", stating that he wrote it in the form of song lyrics and that his main motivation was to impress Dylan. In his book on the 1960s counterculture, There's a Riot Going on, Peter Doggett describes the poem as "magnificent", adding that the 1971 recording sessions produced "hypnotic musical performances that teetered between chaotic rock and the avant-garde".

As of 2016, "September on Jessore Road" was reproduced on two large posters, written in English and Bengali, at the Liberation War Museum in Dhaka. In 2017, Anwarul Karim, a Harvard Visiting Scholar in 1985, and latterly Pro-Vice Chancellor of Northern University Bangladesh, wrote of the poem's impact:

Allen Ginsberg made it an epoch making poem giving details of his on the spot observation. It speaks of the whole of the people who fought for their mother tongue and also for freedom to lead a life of a heroic nation. Allen Ginsberg was bold enough voicing protest and hatred against his own government and the US President for waging war against Vietnam and also for supporting Pakistan for crushing freedom-loving people of Bangladesh. But both US and Pakistan finally met the poetic justice as they both faced defeat at the hands of freedom loving people of Vietnam and Bangladesh.
