= Ballygunge Court =

2007 film

- Directed by: Pinaki Chaudhuri
- Produced by: Ganesh Bagaria
- Starring: Soumitra Chatterjee; Mithu Chakraborty; Sabyasachi Chakraborty; Mamata Shankar; Soma Dey; Tanusree Shankar; Bhaswar Chattopadhyay
- Music by: Chandan Raychowdhury
- Release date: 2007
- Country: India
- Language: Bengali

Ballygunge Court is a 2007 Bengali film directed by Pinaki Chaudhuri and produced by Ganesh Bagaria. The film stars Soumitra Chatterjee, Mithu Chakraborty, Sabyasachi Chakraborty, Mamata Shankar and Tanusree Shankar in the lead roles. It won the National Film Award for Best Feature Film in Bengali.

== Plot ==
The plot revolves with three family in an apartment named Ballygunge Court. Younger generation of the families wants to leave their old house leaving their parents.

== Cast ==
- Soumitra Chatterjee
- Mithu Chakraborty
- Sabyasachi Chakraborty
- Mamata Shankar
- Soma Dey
- Manoj Mitra
- Tanusree Shankar
- Nandini Chatterjee
- Gourishankar Panda
- Ananya Chattopadhyaya
- Bhaswar Chattopadhyay
- Manoj Mitra
- Biplab Chatterjee
- Manika Chakraborty
- Moytree Mitra
