= Shyamali =

1956 film by Ajoy Kar

- Directed by: Ajoy Kar
- Written by: Nirupama Devi
- Screenplay by: Nitai Bhattacharya, Hiren Nag
- Based on: Shyamali novel Nirupama Devi
- Produced by: Kalpana Devi
- Starring: Uttam Kumar; Kaberi Basu
- Cinematography: Ajoy Kar
- Edited by: Ardhendu Chatterjee
- Music by: Kalipada Sen
- Production company: Kalpana Movies Limited
- Distributed by: Kalpana Movies Limited
- Release date: 1956
- Running time: 124 minutes
- Country: India
- Language: Bengali

Shyamali (Bengali: শ্যামলী) is a 1956 Indian Bengali-language romantic drama film directed by Ajoy Kar and stars Kaberi Bose as the title character Shyamali. Uttam Kumar stars in this movie as the male protagonist. The film is based on the novel by same name of Nirupama Devi. The music director of the film was Kalipada Sen. The film was remade in Tamil in 1966 as Kodimalar.

== Plot ==
Shyamali (kabari basu) was a deaf and mute girl. Nobody used to give her much attention. But like any girl she had dreams in her eyes and feelings in her heart. She also had the dreams of her own family. It was her sister's marriage day. Her sister was getting ready. She also dressed up like a bride. Her father thought that God also wanted that Shayamali should get married and thought he will keep his daughter with him, but the groom (uttam kumar) accepted her. But the groom's mother did not accept her. And the separation begins when she gets separated from her husband. She becomes sick, then again he has to bring Shamali to his house again. Then groom's mother accepted her.

== Cast ==
- Uttam Kumar
- Kaberi Bose
- Anubha Gupta

== Soundtrack ==
Shyamali

Soundtrack album by Kalipada Sen
- Released: 1956
- Recorded: 1955
- Studio: Kalpana Movies Limited
- Length: 0:07:49
- Label: Angel Digital Pvt Ltd
- Producer: Kalpana Devi

Kalipada Sen chronology
| Debatra (1955) | Shyamali (1956) | Laksha Hira (1956) |

The music of the film has been composed by Kalipada Sen. The lyrics was written by Pandit Bhusan and Gauriprasanna Mazumder.

| No. | Title | Playback | Length |
|---|---|---|---|
| 1. | "Mon Mohon Shyam Hamare" | pratima Bandyopadhyay | 2:02 |
| 2. | "Himo Mandiro Shovito" | Sandhya Mukherjee | 1:53 |
| 3. | "Chini Go Tare Elo Je" | Satinath Mukherjee | 2:42 |
| 4. | "Amar E Prem" | Sandhya Mukherjee | 3:14 |
| Total length: | | | 7:49 |

== Reception ==
The film is based on Nirupama Devi's novel of same name. The novel was remade before in theater in 1953 to 1956 under Star Theater banner where also Uttam worked as hero and Sabitri Chatterjee as Shyamali. That Shyamali drama create a record in theater and ran over 486 night show. For the popularity of that drama director Ajoy Kar decided to adapted in film so he made this film which also became a blockbuster hit.

== Remakes ==
The movie was remade in Tamil in 1966 as Kodimalar starring Muthuraman and Vijayakumari in lead role.
