= Days and Nights in the Forest =

1970 film by Satyajit Ray

- Indian theatrical poster
- Bengali: Araṇyēra Dinarātri
- Directed by: Satyajit Ray
- Screenplay by: Satyajit Ray
- Based on: Original novel by Sunil Gangopadhyay
- Starring: Soumitra Chatterjee; Subhendu Chatterjee; Samit Bhanja; Rabi Ghosh; Kaberi Bose; Aparna Sen; Sharmila Tagore; Simi Garewal
- Cinematography: Soumendu Roy
- Edited by: Dulal Dutta
- Music by: Satyajit Ray
- Distributed by: Priya Films
- Release date: 16 January 1970 (India)
- Running time: 115 minutes
- Country: India
- Language: Bengali
- Box office: $138,237

Days and Nights in the Forest (Bengali: Araṇyēra Dinarātri) is a 1970 Indian Bengali language dramatic film by Satyajit Ray loosely based on the novel of the same name by Sunil Gangopadhyay. It employs the literary technique of the carnivalesque. The film was nominated for the Golden Bear for Best Film at the 20th Berlin International Film Festival. A sequel Abar Aranye directed by Goutam Ghose was released in 2003.

The film was shown at the New York Film Festival in 1970 and received a standing ovation.

The film was restored in 4K in 2025 by The Film Foundation with support by filmmaker Wes Anderson. The restoration was featured in the Classics section of the 2025 Cannes Film Festival as well as in the revivals section of the 2025 New York Film Festival. Janus Films distributed the restored film in North America.

== Plot ==
The plot of the movie goes back to a similar outing the writer Sunil Gangopadhyay took in the early days of his poetic career. The story unfolds around a group of four men, who remain close friends despite their differences. All four are educated and hail from different layers of society, and the film follows their short holiday in the countryside.

Asim, the leader of the pack, owns the car they drive in, has a cushy job, likes the company of women and yet is very conscious of how he is perceived by them. Sanjoy is a labour executive but would ideally want to immerse himself in literature. Hari, a frank and straightforward cricketer, wants to forget the girl who dumped him. Shekhar is the jester of the group, the only one without a job. He has a roving eye but stays sober when his friends get drunk and vent their frustrations. They set out for the tribal Palamu district in Jharkhand to escape their mundane urban lives. They had read legends about this land, the tribal women who are open, simple and beautiful. They find a place to stay by bribing the chowkidar (caretaker) of a government-owned bungalow in the forest, because they do not have a permit to stay there. The stay symbolizes their distance from city life and civilization: they wonder whether to shave or not. They go drinking in a nearby village in the evening, where Hari gets close to a local tribal Santhal woman named Duli when she approaches the group for more liquor.

Their resolve to be unshaven collapses when Shekhar sees two women in the forest. They introduce themselves to their family: the women are Aparna and her sister-in-law Jaya, who are staying in a house nearby with Aparna's father and Jaya's son. The two urban groups of people are almost relieved to find each other here. Asim flirts with Aparna and coaxes her to show her room. He is attracted to the elegant and enigmatic Aparna, but is unable to keep pace with her composure, presence of mind and intelligence. At night the four friends go to drink alcohol again in the village. Hari is upset because he cannot find Duli. While returning to their rest house, they stumble upon a car which they shout at without realising it is that of Aparna and Jaya. They oversleep and miss the next day's breakfast at Jaya's house. They find a tiffin outside their bungalow and go to Aparna's house to return it. Later, the conservator visits the bungalow and catches the group using it without official permission. When they are about to be kicked out, Aparna, the conservator's acquaintance, manages the situation with grace and composure. The group decides to chat and play a game while Aparna's father is away with Jaya's son. The game reaches a crescendo, with only Asim and Aparna left in the fray, at which point Aparna deliberately hands victory to Asim, who seems to have gambled all his confidence for the win.

The tensions peak at the village fair where the four friends go their own ways. Shekhar goes off to gamble with money borrowed from Asim. Hari takes Duli into the forest and has sex with her. Asim feels his pride and self-confidence shattered when Aparna reveals her more vulnerable side behind her composed exterior. She also holds up a mirror to his bourgeois and urban insensitivity by pointing out how despite having spent three days at the bungalow, he and his friends never bothered to inquire about the chowkidar's wife. Meanwhile, Shekhar finds himself helping all his friends (especially Hari, when the latter gets injured and robbed), despite being the buffoon of the gang. Sanjoy, held back by his bourgeois moralities, is unable to respond to Jaya's bold advances. The next morning, the four friends leave for Calcutta since their new friends have had to return in a hurry. As a parting gift, they receive a tray of boiled eggs, sent by ever thoughtful Jaya.

== Cast ==
- Soumitra Chatterjee as Ashim
- Subhendu Chatterjee as Sanjoy
- Samit Bhanja as Hari
- Rabi Ghosh as Shekhar
- Pahari Sanyal as Sadashiv Tripathi
- Sharmila Tagore as Aparna
- Kaberi Bose as Jaya
- Simi Garewal as Duli
- Aparna Sen as Hari's former lover

== Reception ==
Critics praised it heavily worldwide. The New Yorker's Pauline Kael felt that "Satyajit Ray’s films can give rise to a more complex feeling of happiness in me than the work of any other director.... No artist has done more than Ray to make us reevaluate the commonplace." In Reeling, Kael added: "A major film by one of the great film artists, starring Soumitra Chatterjee and the incomparably graceful Sharmila Tagore."

David Robinson wrote in the Financial Times, "Every word and gesture is recognizable, comprehensible, true ... Ray's work at its best, like this, has an extraordinary rightness in every aspect of its selection and presentation - the timing, performance, cutting, music - which seem to place it beyond discussion."

Jonathan Rosenbaum, in his list of '1000 ESSENTIAL FILMS', kept this film as one of his favourite films released in 1970. The New York Times described the film as a ‘rare, wistful movie that somehow proves it’s good to be alive.’

British film critic Tom Milne praised the film writing “Ray gradually distils a magical world of absolute stasis: a shimmering summer’s day, a tranquil forest clearing, the two women strolling in a shady avenue, wistful yearnings as love and the need for love echo plangently… Beautifully shot and acted, it’s probably Ray’s masterpiece.”

The Village Voice critic, William Paul, was one of the detractors of the movie in the West. He wrote, "Days and Nights seems anachronistically the ideal art-house film of the 50s: vaguely humanistic without any feeling for the complexities of human life, pretentious, short on plot but striving to be long on character, stylistically awkward as a sign of sincere emotions, and all of it held together by a title that is more poetic than anything in the movie itself."

Andrew Robinson, in the book The Inner Eye remarked, "Both the admirers and the detractors in the West were convinced that the film was transparent to them. They seemed unaware that many of its 'words and gestures' might conceal an unfamiliar world."
