= Tamil historical novels =

Genre in Tamil literature

Tamil historical novels are a genre of Tamil literature that began to appear in the mid-19th century.

== History ==
Prathaapa Mudaliaar Charithram ("The Life of Prathaapa Mudaliaar"), written in 1857 and published in 1879, was the first novel in the Tamil language. The novel does not involve historical characters or events but is set in royal times. Penned by Maayuram Vedanaayakam Pillai, it was a landmark in Tamil literature, which had hitherto seen writings only in poetry. The book gave birth to a new literary genre and Tamil prose began to be recognized as an increasingly important part of the language. One can see the style of any Tamil author in this novel.

Aabathukidamaana Apavaadham -or- Kamalaambaal Charithram is written by Rajam Iyer from Vathalakundu in the later part of the 19th century is the first Tamil novel depicting the life of living people. The author worked in Tamil daily Dinamani; he live just 26 years. Considering the period in which he lived and wrote, he created waves in emancipation of women's life, incomparable to any social reformist. In this story he conducted marriage to a Brahmin widow. Had he lived further and wrote more, the style of modern Tamil prose would have been different.

Authors like Kalki Krishnamurthy, Akilan wrote historical novels during the Indian independence movement to instil patriotic pride in the people. Most historical novels were serialised in Tamil magazines before being published in book form. The advent of netzines has seen new web based historical writers entering the arena.

== Online novels ==
- Cheraar Kottai (சேரர் கோட்டை)(Part-II of Rajakesari), another historic novel by Gokul Seshadri happens during the early part of Rajaraja Chola's life. It is woven around the circumstances under which Rajaraja makes his first and memorable victory at Kanthaloor Chalai - a Chera Martial Arts Academy of 10th Century AD near Tiruvananthapuram. Also serialized in Varalaaru.Com e-magazine, it was later published as a book by Kamalam Books. Click Here to view the book

== See also ==
- List of Historical novels in Indian languages
- Varalaru
- Tamil Heritage Foundation, digitalization of ancient Tamil books and palm-leaf manuscripts
- தமிழ் வரலாற்றுப் புதினங்களின் பட்டியல
