= Priya Cinema (Kolkata) =

Priya Entertainments Pvt Ltd
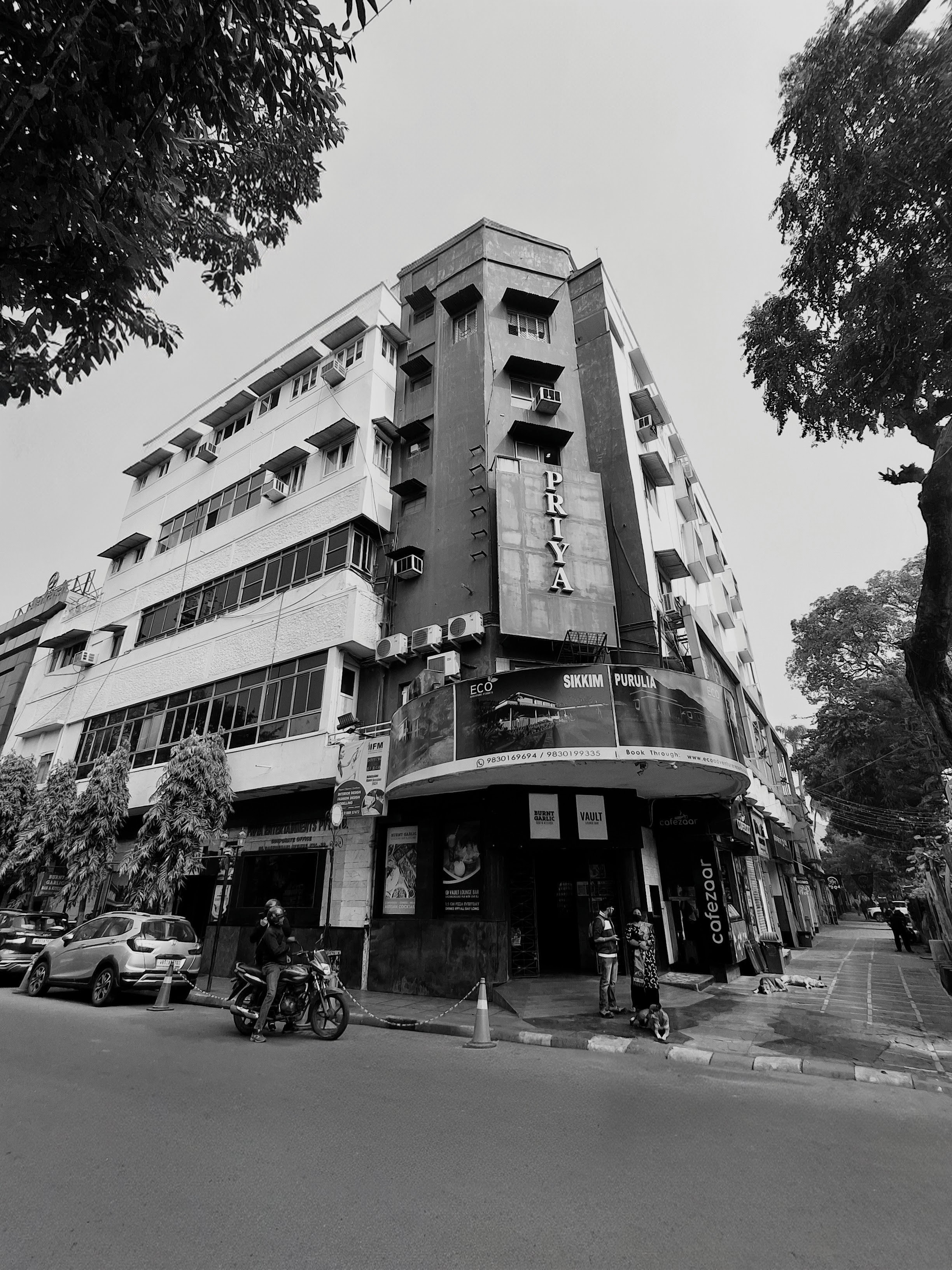
- Facade of Priya Cinema, Kolkata in 2024

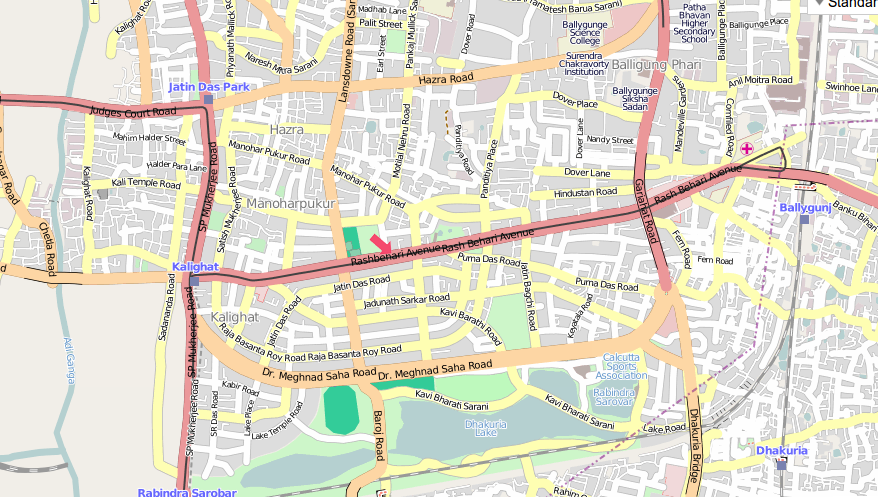
- Location in Kolkata

General information
- Status: Active
- Type: Cinema hall
- Location: 95, Rash Behari Avenue Kolkata, West Bengal 700029, Kolkata, India
- Coordinates: 22°31′05″N 88°21′16″E
- Opened: 22 May 1959
- Inaugurated: 22 May 1959
- Owner: Priya Entertainments Pvt. Ltd

Website
- Official website

Priya Cinema is a uniplex cinema hall situated in Rashbehari Avenue, near Deshapriya Park, Kolkata, West Bengal, India. The management is run by Priya Entertainments Pvt. Ltd. under the leadership of the managing director Arijit Dutta. This is one of the first cinema halls in eastern India to have features like a Dolby Atmos [(sound system)], Xenon Christie projector, Recliner seats, QUBE digital projection system, Harkness Screen and 2K Projection System.

== Film Distribution ==
The company's business extends to the distribution of films as well. They had been the sole distributors for the three biggest Hollywood studios- Sony Pictures, Paramount Pictures and Walt Disney for releasing their films in Eastern India.. PEPL has also partnered with some of the big Indian production houses viz. UTV Films, NDTV Lumiere, Acropolis, Mumbai Mantra, National Film Development Corporation etc.

== Film Production ==
The house of Priya Entertainments began its journey in the 60s with producing widely acclaimed films like Goopy Gyne Bagha Byne, Aranyer Dinratri, Pratidwandi directed by Satyajit Ray, Hatey Bazarey directed by Tapan Sinha and Chhuti-the first film directed by Arundhati Devi. It also produced many other films including Bonojyotsna, Saraswatir Pratigya and Kalochhaya.

Many of these films have won major national and international awards adding to the glory and heritage of this prestigious production house. Hatey Bajare won President's Gold Medal Award in 1967. Goopy Gyne Bagha Byne won a no. of awards in India and abroad including Best Direction Award, India (1968), Best Film Award, India, Silver Cross, Adelaide and Best Director, Auckland in 1969, Merit Award, Tokyo, Best Film, Melbourne and President's Gold and Silver Medals, New Delhi in 1970. Aranyer Dinratri was nominated for Best Director Award Golden Bear in Berlin International Film Festival 1n 1970. Pratidwandi won the Best Direction Award and Best Screenplay Award in India in 1971.

Priya Entertainments also has the rare distinction of winning President's Gold Award for Best Producer for three years on the trot.

== See also ==
- Nandan (Kolkata)
