= Gumasthavin Magal =

- Theatrical release poster
- Directed by: A. P. Nagarajan
- Screenplay by: A. P. Nagarajan
- Story by: Nirupama Devi
- Produced by: C. N. Venkatasamy
- Starring: Sivakumar; Kamal Haasan; Aarathi; Usha; Nagesh
- Cinematography: K. S. Prasanth
- Edited by: T. Vijayarangam; E. Arunachalam
- Music by: Kunnakudi Vaidyanathan
- Production company: C. N. V. Movies
- Release date: April 27, 1974
- Running time: 138 minutes
- Country: India
- Language: Tamil

Gumasthavin Magal (transl. The clerk's daughter) is a 1974 Indian Tamil-language film, directed by A. P. Nagarajan, starring Sivakumar, Kamal Haasan and Aarathi. The film is an adaptation of the play of the same name, itself based on Nirupama Devi's Bengali novel Annapurnaar Mandir. It was released on 27 April 1974.

== Plot ==
Seetha and Sarasa are sisters. Their father Ramaswami works as a clerk under a rich philanderer Mani, who is married to Vimala. Ramu is another rich man in the village. Ramu's mother wishes to get him married to Seetha. But Ramu refuses, and the desperate father gets her married to a doddering old man. The poor woman becomes a widow even before the wedding ceremony is completely over. Her father also dies in shock. Mani offers cash to Seetha and asks her to be his concubine, but Seetha rejects, having lost all faith in men, and commits suicide. Ramu feels he is responsible for her tragic end, and comes forward to arrange Sarasa's marriage with the now-reformed Mani also willing to help the family. When the bridegroom and his family walk out over an argument over dowry which Ramu is willing to give, Mani steps in to say that the family is only after money which will ruin Sarasa's life. He insists that Ramu marry Sarasa to redeem him for ruining Seetha's life as he had done by arranging this marriage.

== Cast ==
- Sivakumar as Ramu
- Kamal Haasan as Mani
- Aarathi as Seetha
- Usha as Vimala
- Nagesh as Appusamy Josiyar
- V. S. Raghavan as Ramaswami
- Pandari Bai as Thiruppurasundari, Ramu's mother
- T. V. Kumudini as Pankajam, Seetha's mother
- T. K. Bhagavathi (Guest Appearance)
- S. Rama Rao
- Shakila
- Manorama (guest appearance)

== Production ==
Gumasthavin Magal is an adaptation of the play of the same name, itself based on Nirupama Devi's Bengali novel Annapurnaar Mandir. It was previously filmed in Tamil as Gumasthavin Penn in 1941. Nagarajan who acted in the play portraying a female character was the director of this adaptation.

== Soundtrack ==
The music was composed by Kunnakudi Vaidyanathan, while the lyrics were written by "Poovai" Senguttavan and "Ulandhurpettai" Shanmugam.

Song	Singers
"Ennai Paarthu"	Sirkazhi Govindarajan
"Ezhudhi Ezhudhi"	Soolamangalam Rajalakshmi, M. R. Vijaya
"Kaalam Seiyum"	Malaysia Vasudevan
"Therodum Veedhiyile"	Soolamangalam Rajalakshmi

== Reception ==
Kanthan of Kalki praised the story and cast performances. Navamani praised the acting and direction.
