= Kaberi Bose =

Indian actress

- কাবেরী বসু
- Born: 28 November 1938; Calcutta, Bengal Presidency, British India
- Died: 18 February 1977 (aged 38); Calcutta, West Bengal, India
- Occupation: Actress
- Years active: 1955–1975
- Notable work: Raikamal; Drishti; Devi Malini; Aranyer Din Ratri; Ami Se O Sakha
- Spouse: Ajit Chattopadhyay (m. 1956)
- Mother: Pritimoyi Bose
- Awards: Bengal Film Journalists' Association – Best Supporting Actress Award (1971)

Kaberi Bose (28 March 1938 – 18 February 1977) was an Indian actress. She was an acclaimed actress in Bengali cinema.

Her notable films include Nagar Darpane (1975), Je Jekhane Dariye (1974), Ami Se O Sakha (1974), Aranyer Din Ratri (1969), Shyamali (1956), Madhumalati (1957), Raikamal (1955), Debimalini (1955), Paradhin (1956), and Shankar Narayan Bank (1956). She acted opposite Uttam Kumar in Shyamali, and was directed by Satyajit Ray in Aranyer Din Ratri.

Bose was born on 28 March 1938. Director Subodh Mitra's 1955 directorial venture Rajkamal was Kaberi's debut film. Following Rajkamal, she worked in seven Bengali movies within a span of one year.

== Personal life ==
Kaberi Bose married Ajit Chattopadhyay in 1956. After getting married, she quit the film industry and moved to Munger. She had three children, one son and two daughters. After a sabbatical of 12 years, Kaberi worked in Aranyer Din Ratri (1970). Her performance in the film was critically acclaimed. Despite making a successful comeback, Kaberi did not return to acting fulltime.

On 12 June 1970, Kaberi, along with her spouse and youngest daughter got into an accident on their way from Darjeeling. Her daughter and husband succumbed to the accident. Kaberi survived with grave injuries.

== Death ==
In 1976, she was diagnosed with cancer. She died on 18 February 1977.
