= Ek Tukro Chand =

2001 Indian film by Pinaki Chaudhuri

- Ek Tukro Chand poster
- Directed by: Pinaki Chaudhuri
- Screenplay by: Pinaki Chaudhuri
- Story by: Sunil Gangopadhyay
- Based on: Sontu O Ektukro Chaand by Sunil Gangopadhyay
- Produced by: National Film Development Corporation of India
- Starring: Sabyasachi Chakrabarty; Soham Chakraborty; Mrinal Mukherjee; Bhola Tamang
- Music by: Chandan Raychowdhury
- Release date: 1 January 2001
- Running time: 83 minutes
- Country: India
- Language: Bengali

Ek Tukro Chand (transl. A Piece of Moon) is a 2001 Indian Bengali action adventure film directed by Pinaki Chaudhuri, based on the Kakababu story, Santu O Ek Tukro Chand by Sunil Gangopadhyay. It is a sequel to 1995 film Kakababu Here Gelen?.

== Synopsis ==
Simon Bubumba, the brother of the President of the small African fictional state of Murundi, is kidnapped. At the same time a stone from Moon has been stolen from the Indian Museum of Kolkata. Kakababu's friend, CBI Officer Narendra Verma seeks help from Kakababu. As per his suggestion Kakababu (Sabyasachi), Sontu (Soham) and his friend Jojo reach Palamau Forest Bunglow to investigate the suspected kidnapper Major Thakur Singh (Mrinal). They outsmart him to find that he is lodging a fake Bubumba. Then they reach Gangtok where they find Bubumba and also finds the thief who had stolen the stone collected from the Moon's surface by U.S. astronauts.

== Plot ==
A few precious pieces of moonstones have been brought by American astronauts from the Moon to be exhibited in museums all over the world. One such moonstone gets stolen from the Indian Museum, Kolkata. At the same time, Simon Bubumba, brother of President Bubumba of the African state of Murundi, who has come to India for diplomatic reasons, gets kidnapped from his guest house. Raja Roy Chowdhury a.k.a Kakababu is requested by his friend, CBI official Narendra Verma, to go to Major Thakur Singh, a powerful and wealthy lord of a village in the forests of Daltonganj, as he is suspected of kidnapping Simon Bubumba in demand of heavy ransom. Kakababu's nephew Santu and Santu's friend Jojo accompany him on this adventure. After a series of attacks and counterattacks, Kakababu finally has Thakur Singh captivated, only to find that the man imprisoned in his house is an impostor. Kakababu travels to the hills with a briefcase supposedly having the ransom money. After he is taken to the kidnapper's den by the kidnapper's henchmen, he discovers that the mastermind behind the operation is Simon Bubumba himself, who faked his own kidnap to get the money. After they are surrounded by Narendra Verma's forces, Santu discovers that the ring in Simon's hand contains the stolen moonstone. He deduces that Simon had the stone stolen to increase his chances of becoming the president as he has a belief in astrology.

== Cast ==
- Sabyasachi Chakrabarty as Kakababu
- Soham Chakraborty as Shontu
- Mrinal Mukherjee as Major Thakur Singh
- Mithu Chakraborty as Santu's mother
- Biswajit Chakraborty as a police officer
- Arjit Sengupta
- Bita Chakraborty
- Bhola Tamang
- Ashish Chatterjee
- Biplab Dasgupta as the Police Officer visiting Kakababu

== Development ==
After making Kakababu Here Gelen? in 1995, director Pinaki Chaudhuri wanted to make a sequel with Sabyasachi Chakrabarty. After some discussion with Chakrabarty he roped him to play Kakababu again in Ek Tukro Chand. Actor Soham Chakraborty roped as Shontu as a replacement of Arghyo Chakraborty.
