= Nandan (Kolkata) =

Movie theatre and cultural centre in Kolkata, India

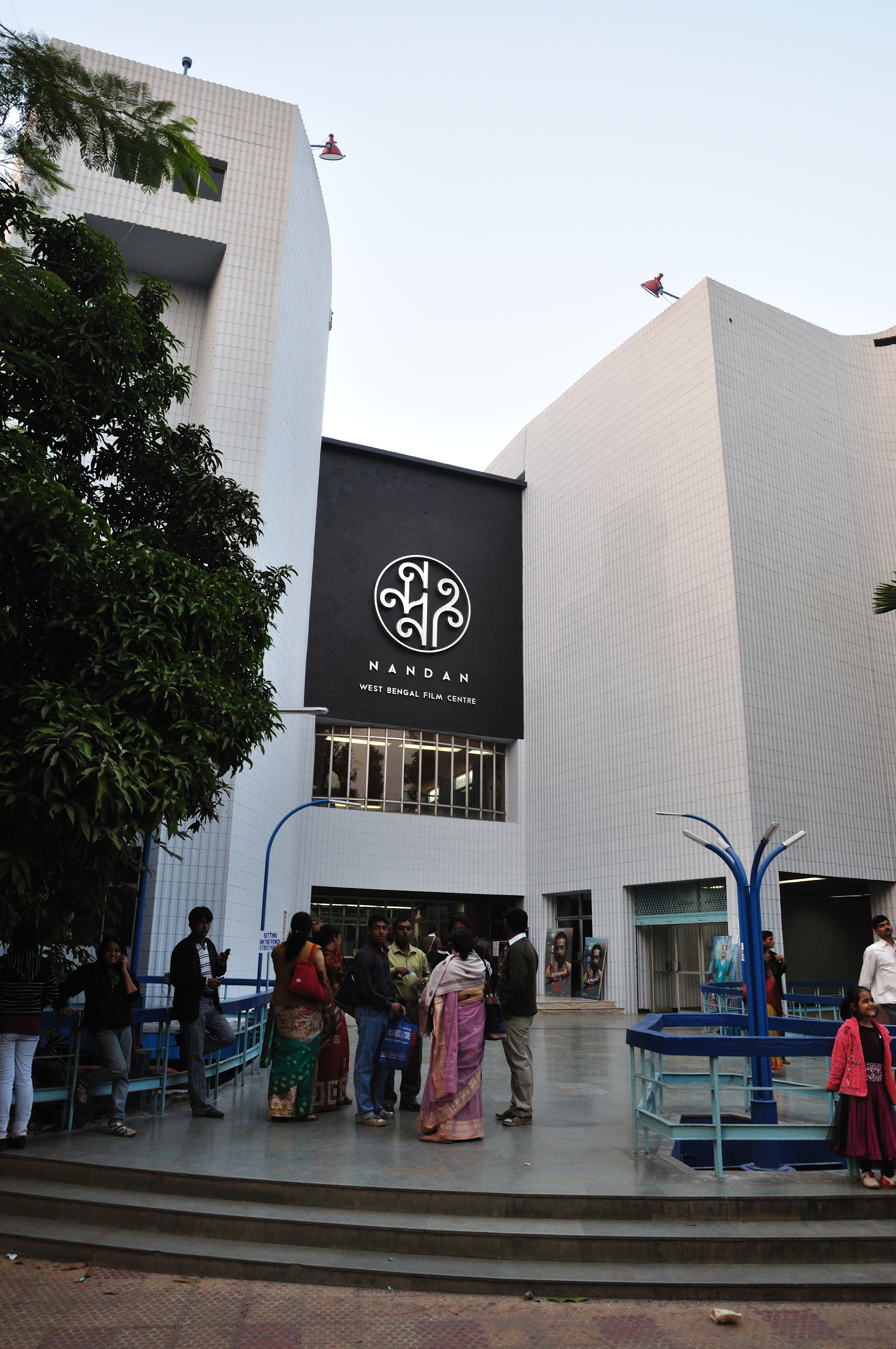
- Façade of Nandan
- Interactive map of the Nandan area

General information
- Status: Active
- Architectural style: Modern
- Location: Acharya Jagadish Chandra Bose Road and Cathedral Road junction, 1/1, Lala Lajpat Rai Sarani, AJC Bose Road, Kolkata, India
- Coordinates: 22.542321°N 88.345615°E
- Inaugurated: 2 September 1985
- Renovated: April 2011
- Owner: West Bengal Government

Design and construction
- Architect: Bikash Naskar

Other information
- Seating capacity: Nandan I: 931; Nandan II: 200; Nandan III: 100

Nandan is a government-sponsored film and cultural centre in Kolkata, India. The primary aim of the cultural hub is to encourage and facilitate cinematic awareness in society. It includes a few comparatively large screens.

Nandan is one of the main venues of the Kolkata International Film Festival, hosting it until 2010. While in 2011 the opening and closing ceremonies were shifted to Netaji Indoor Stadium, Nandan remains the main centre for the festival.

== History ==
The foundation stone of Nandan was laid by former Chief Minister of West Bengal Jyoti Basu in 1980 and it was inaugurated by film-maker Satyajit Ray on 2 September 1985. He designed the logo for the complex as well. Initially, Nandan had two auditoriums, and a third auditorium was made soon after.

In April 2011, the false ceiling of a Nandan auditorium crashed down. Right after the incident, the West Bengal government decided to refurbish Nandan, starting the renovation work with the construction of a new false ceiling for Nandan I. For the first phase of the renovation project, West Government gave ₹2.5 million (US$26,000) to the Nandan authorities. The restoration works completed weeks before the 2011 Kolkata International Film Festival. Post of advisory board was Tarun Majumdar.

As of February 2013 the Nandan committee is headed by Bengali film director Sandip Ray. A few other members of the managing committee are Aparna Sen, Prabhat Roy, and Ranjit Mallick.

=== Nandan and Buddhadeb Bhattacharjee ===
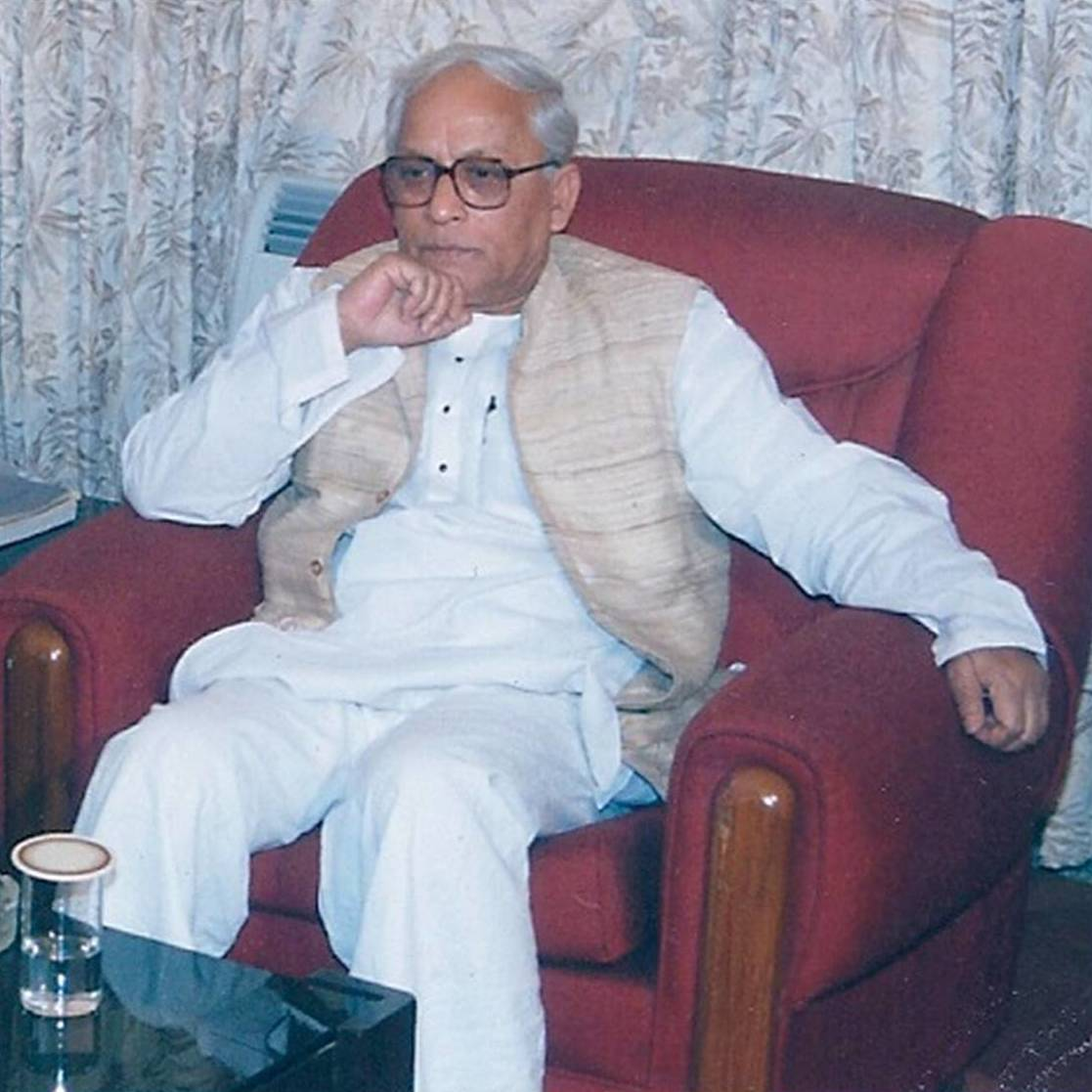
Ex Chief Minister of West Bengal Buddhadeb Bhattacharjee has a long relationship with Nandan. In 1980 he laid the foundation stone of the theatre, and for a long time Nandan was his favourite haunt.

Former Chief Minister of West Bengal Buddhadeb Bhattacharjee had a long relationship with Nandan. In 1980 he laid the foundation stone of the theatre. After losing the 1982 assembly election from Cossipore, he did not come to Nandan until 1987, when he changed constituency to Jadavpur and after winning the election.

After becoming the Chief Minister of West Bengal in 2001, he started visiting the auditorium more frequently. Till 1995 he did not have his own room there. Then he got a 300 sq ft carpeted room on Nandan's second floor. There, he often used to meet personalities like Sunil Gangopadhyay, Soumitra Chatterjee etc. and proofread his writings on Manik Bandopadhyay or Jibanananda Das.

After being defeated at the 2011 assembly elections of West Bengal by the Trinamool congress candidate Manish Gupta, Bhattacharjee stopped coming to Nandan. According to a report published in The Telegraph in July 2011, two months after West Bengal's assembly elections, Bhattacharjee almost stopped visiting his favourite evening spot.

=== Arrest of artists during 2007 Kolkata International Film Festival ===
On the afternoon of 11 November 2007, actors, artists and writers of West Bengal were demonstrating at a protest in Cathedral Road against the Nandigram violence in which at least 14 people died. At the same time, the Kolkata International Film Festival was going on in the theatres on Nandan. Kolkata Police and Rapid Action Force personnel were sent to the spot and arrested nearly 100 protesters including 20 women. The list of people who were arrested on the day included actor Parambrata Chatterjee and actress Bidipta Chakraborty. They were released after five hours after a meeting between deputy commissioner (headquarters) Vineet Goyel and a group of protesters led by director Aparna Sen, Gautam Ghose and Bengali poet Sankha Ghosh. Later, actor Parambrata Chatterjee said that he could not figure out the reason for the arrest: "I don’t know on what grounds we were arrested. We did not step into Nandan, nor did we have any arms and ammunition. We were sitting outside the Academy of Fine Arts, singing."

== Programs and festivals ==
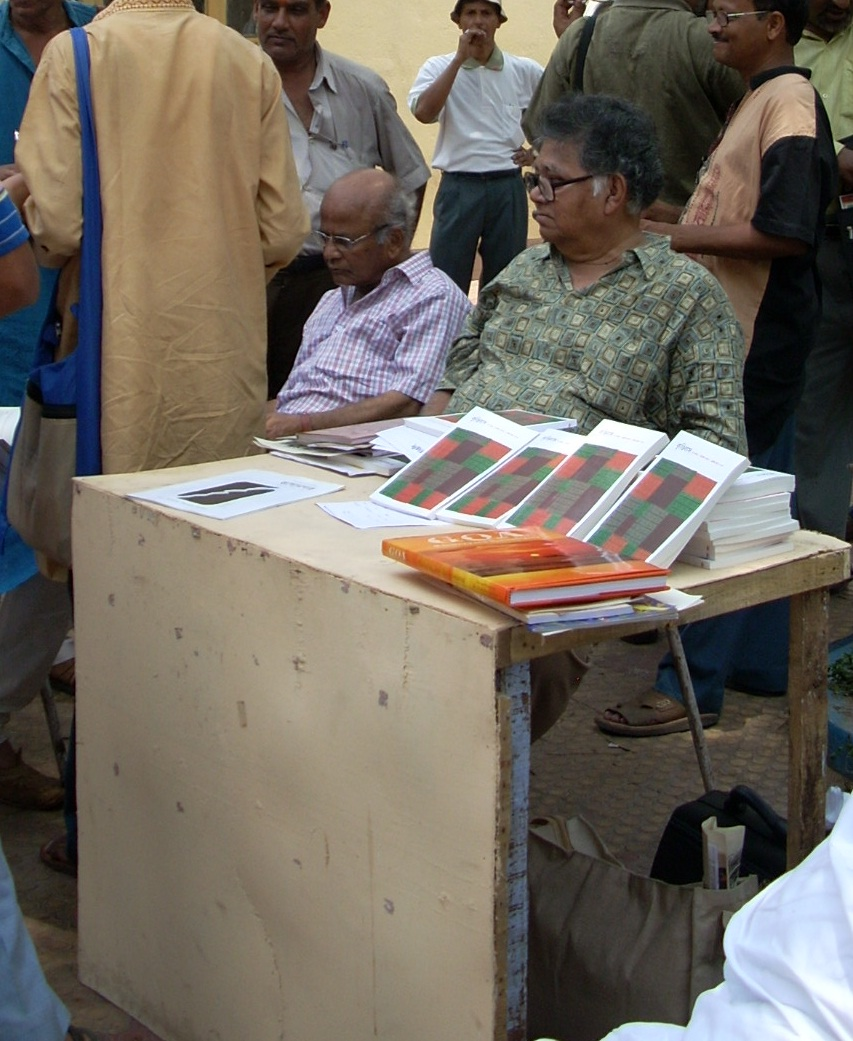
Deceased poet Sunil Gangopadhyay in Krittibash book stall in little magazine festival in Nandan

Nandan has been a cultural hub of Kolkata for a long time. Memorial lectures and special programs are organised there on a regular basis. Nandan also organises a Social Communication Film Festival in collaboration with Roopkala Kendra.

=== Kolkata International Film Festival ===
Kolkata International Film Festival started in 1995 and is India's third oldest film festival. Nandan is one of the main venues of this festival. Till 2010 the film festival was inaugurated at Nandan. In 2011, Mamata Banerjee, after becoming the Chief Minister of West Bengal, shifted the ceremony from Nandan to the Netaji Indoor Stadium.

=== Little Magazine Festival ===
A little magazine festival is organised by Paschimbanga Bangla Akademi in the Nandan premises every year. The festival commenced in 2001. Little magazine publishers from outside India (like Bangladesh) have also joined this festival.

== Controversies ==
There have been complaints against Nandan that screening of controversial films are often shunned there due to political pressure. In 2005 Nandan committee disallowed a screening of Herbert, saying that the film would send out wrong signals to audiences. One Day from a Hangman's Life directed by Joshy Joseph was banned there after getting instruction from the Chief Minister of West Bengal. Arekti Premer Golpo (2010), directed by Kaushik Ganguly, which dealt with homosexuality, was also barred at this theatre. Moinak Biswas, associate professor at Jadavpur University, whose film Sthaniyo Sangbad was disallowed in Nandan in 2010, commented, "Since all these films, including mine, had a censor certificate, it wasn’t Nandan's role to play super censor." In May 2013, the theatre refused to screen the Bengali film Kagojer Nouka directed by Partha Sarathi Jowardar. The film revolved around a chit fund scam. Jowardar told to media that they sent the movie to Nandan authority for preview but he thought he did not even see the film before barring it.

== See also ==
- Priya Cinema (Kolkata)
