= Cherar Kottai =

சேரர் கோட்டை
- Author: Gokul Seshadri
- Original title: Cherar Kottai
- Illustrator: Gokul Seshadri
- Language: Tamil
- Genre: Tamil historical novels
- Publisher: Kamalam Books
- Publication date: 21 July 2012
- Publication place: India
- English publication date: No
- Media type: Book
- Pages: 1100 (2 volumes)
- ISBN: 978-8183797160
- Preceded by: Rajakesari
- Followed by: Udhayabanu Karmegam

Cherar Kottai (Tamil:சேரர் கோட்டை), Fortress of Chera Kings is a Tamil language historical novel in two volumes written by Gokul Seshadri. It is a sequel to Seshadri's novel Rajakesari, and it precedes Udhayabanu Karmegam, the final book of the trilogy. The story is based on the first military conquest of the Chola king Rajaraja Chola, at a place known as Kanthalur Salai in present-day Kerala.

== Premise ==
In 988 AD, king Rajaraja Chola is contemplating a military raid on Kanthalur Salai, a martial arts academy in the Chera Country (present day Kerala). Circumstantial evidence indicates that the current head of the school, Thirunarayana Bhattadhiri, might have played a crucial role in the brutal killing of king Rajarajan's elder brother, crown prince Aditha Karikalan, 20 years earlier. However, the king is hesitant to undertake a regular military raid, as the academy has a good reputation and is attached to a Shiva temple.

Unable to move forward, the king and his royal companions seek the help of a Buddhist Monk called Mahakasyapa Thera, the head of the Bhadaratitta Monastery at Nagappattinam, a seaport in the lands ruled by the Chola dynasty. He proposes a plan, and two young Chola warriors, Kamban Araiyan and Paraman Malapadi, are dispatched to carry it out.

The two warriors travel to Kanniyakumari, located in the southernmost part of present-day Tamil Nadu.

== Characters ==
- Rajaraja Chola (historical)
- Rajaraja Pallavarayar (historical)
- Maha Kashyapa Thera (fictional)
- Paraman Malapadiyar (historical)
- Kamban Maniyan alias Vikrama Singha Muvendavelar (historical)
- Amarabhujanga Deva (historical)
- Sadaya Mara Pandiya (historical)
- Arayan Manabharana (historical)
- Renuka Devi (fictional, historical)
- Thirunarayana Bhattathiri (fictional)
- Vamanan Namboothiri (fictional)
- Ravidasan Panchavan Brahmadhirajan (historical)
- Parameswara (historical)

== Publication history ==
The story was originally serialized in the monthly web magazine Varalaaru.com, beginning in 2007. It was published as a two-volume book by Kamalam books in July 2012, and a revised second edition of the book was published by Palaniappa Brothers in 2015.
