= Kakababu Here Gelen? =

1995 Indian Bengali-language film

- Directed by: Pinaki Chaudhuri
- Written by: Sunil Gangopadhyay (story), Joy Mukherjee (scenario & dialogue)
- Starring: Soumitra Chatterjee; Sabyasachi Chakraborty; Kushal Chakraborty
- Release date: 25 August 1995
- Country: India
- Language: Bengali

Kakababu Here Gelen? (transl. Did Kakababu Lose?) is a Bengali detective film of Kakababu series, released in 1995 directed by Pinaki Chaudhuri under the banner of National Film Development Corporation. It is based on a detective novel of Sunil Gangopadhyay by the same name. The movie is a prequel to the 2001 Bengali movie Ek Tukro Chand. Soumitra Chatterjee played the role of antihero in this movie.

== Plot ==
Being unable to maintain his maternal uncle's ancestral house, Biman and his wife Dipa sell their house to a person who decides to demolish it and build something new there. Biman and Dipa want Kakababu (Raja Roy Chowdhury) and his nephew Santu to visit the place on 5 March as Biman would have to hand over the building to the buyer by 8 March. However, Santu's examinations would end on 9 March, so he could not accompany them. Kakababu, Biman and Dipa visit the house which is in Alinagar, near Birbhum, along with an expert antique dealer, Asit Dhar.

In the course of their conversations, Biman tells Kakababu and Asit Dhar about his mother's uncle, Dharma Narayan Rao. He had adopted Christianity and changed his name to Gregory Rao. As he had converted to a different religion, he was banished from his house. Ten years later, he was brought back home but he had become completely eccentric. However, he often mentioned the presence of a valuable item in his possession. Few years later, he was found dead in his room. After his death, his room was searched but no valuable item could be found.

Asit Dhar grew curious and late in the night he tried to enter the room but could not. The next morning, everybody went to have a look at the room and there Asit Dhar saw something that made him greedy to steal it. He deliberately pushed Kakababu down the stairs and while Biman and his wife became busy in helping Kakababu, Asit Dhar fled with the item.

Kakababu gets angry with Asit Dhar for injuring him. The latter also challenges Kakababu to identify what item he had stolen. Kakababu seeks help from the police to recover the item the latter had stolen from Biman's house. Meanwhile, he asks his nephew to observe Asit Dhar and take photographs of whatever he does and wherever he goes.

At the end of the day, Asit Dhar himself comes to Kakababu and hands over 12 pearls and some jewelry that he had found in the bed on which Gregory Rao slept. He said that he had stolen those things from the room and not the ruby necklace of Nawab Siraj ud-Daulah which everybody was suspecting.

When he was leaving, Santu pushed Asit Dhar intentionally to avenge for his uncle. At that moment, Asit Dhar's briefcase opened up and a Bible printed by Gutenberg fell out. Kakababu later realised that it was actually the Bible that Asit Dhar had stolen. They immediately set off and nabbed him in the airport just before he boarded the plane to London.

Kakababu admitted that the Bible would be kept in the National Library with the name of Asit Dhar as its discoverer.

== Cast ==
- Sabyasachi Chakrabarty as Kakababu
- Soumitra Chatterjee as Asit Dhar
- Kushal Chakraborty as Biman
- Dolon Roy as Dipa
- Sunil Mukherjee as Gregory Rao
- Moon Moon Sen as Munmun (Guest appearance)
- Bharat Kaul as Sachin
- Arghyo Chakraborty as Santu
- Partha Sarathi Deb
