= Those Days (novel) =

1985 novel by Sunil Gangopadhyay

- The cover image of Those Days
- Author: Sunil Gangopadhyay
- Original title: সেই সময় (Sei Samay)
- Translator: Aruna Chakravorty
- Language: Bengali
- Genre: Historical novel
- Publisher: Ananda Publishers, Penguin Books
- Publication place: India
- English publication date: 1997
- Awards: Sahitya Akademi Award
- ISBN: 9780140268522
- OCLC: 39516159
- Followed by: First Light

Those Days or Sei Somoy (Bengali: সেই সময়) is a historical novel by Indian author Sunil Gangopadhyay. Originally written in Bengali, it was first serialized in the Desh magazine. The novel depicts 19th-century Bengal through the life of Nabinkumar, based on Kaliprasanna Singha, and features key historical figures of the era. In 1985, it won the Sahitya Akademi Award.

The story centers around the life of Nabinkumar (based on Kaliprasanna Singha), along with other prominent historical figures, including Ishwar Chandra Vidyasagar, the reformer; Michael Madhusudan Dutt, the poet; Rani Rashmoni, the philanthropist Zamindarni; and her son-in-law Mathur Babu; the father and son duo of Dwarkanath Tagore and Debendranath Tagore; Harish Chandra Mukherjee, the journalist; Keshab Chandra Sen, the Brahmo Samaj radical; David Hare and John Bethune, the English educationists; Dinabandhu Mitra, the playwright; Radhanath Sikdar, the mathematician; Bhudev Mukhopadhyay, the novelist; and others.

Yugantar, an Indian television series that aired on DD National in the 1980s, was based on Sei Somoy. The novel was translated into Gujarati by Uma Randeria as Nava Yugnu Parodh (2002).
