= First Light (Ganguly novel) =

Novel by Sunil Gangopadhyay

- The cover image of প্রথম আলো (First Light, part 1) published by Ananda Publishers
- Author: Sunil Gangopadhyay
- Original title: প্রথম আলো
- Translator: Aruna Chakravarti
- Language: Bengali
- Subject: History
- Genre: Historical novel
- Publisher: Ananda Publishers, Penguin Books
- Publication place: India
- English publication date: 2001
- Awards: Saraswati Samman
- ISBN: 978-0-14-100430-3
- OCLC: 47225450
- Preceded by: Those Days

First Light (Bengali: প্রথম আলো) is a historical novel by Sunil Gangopadhyay, centering on historical figures like Rabindranath Tagore, Swami Vivekananda, Ramakrishna, Bankim Chandra Chattopadhyay, Ishwar Chandra Vidyasagar, George Curzon. It is set in India during the second half of the nineteenth century of Indian history, focusing on the Bengal Renaissance.
