= Aranyer Din Ratri (novel) =

Bengali novel by Sunil Gangopadhyay

- Author: Sunil Gangopadhyay
- Language: Bengali
- Publication place: India

Aranyer Din Ratri (lit. 'Days and nights in the forest') is a novel by the Bengali author Sunil Gangopadhyay. It was his second published novel. The plot follows four unemployed youths who, disillusioned with city life, retreat to a forest for a week—only to confront the very realities they sought to leave behind.

== In popular culture ==
- In 1970, Aranyer Din Ratri was adapted into a film of the same name by Satyajit Ray, starring Soumitra Chatterjee, Rabi Gosh, Sharmila Tagore, among others.
- The novel is mentioned in Neel Mukherjee's The Lives of Others (2014) as one of its Bengali literary references.
