= Sunil Gangopadhyay =

Indian poet and author (1934–2012)

- সুনীল গঙ্গোপাধ্যায়
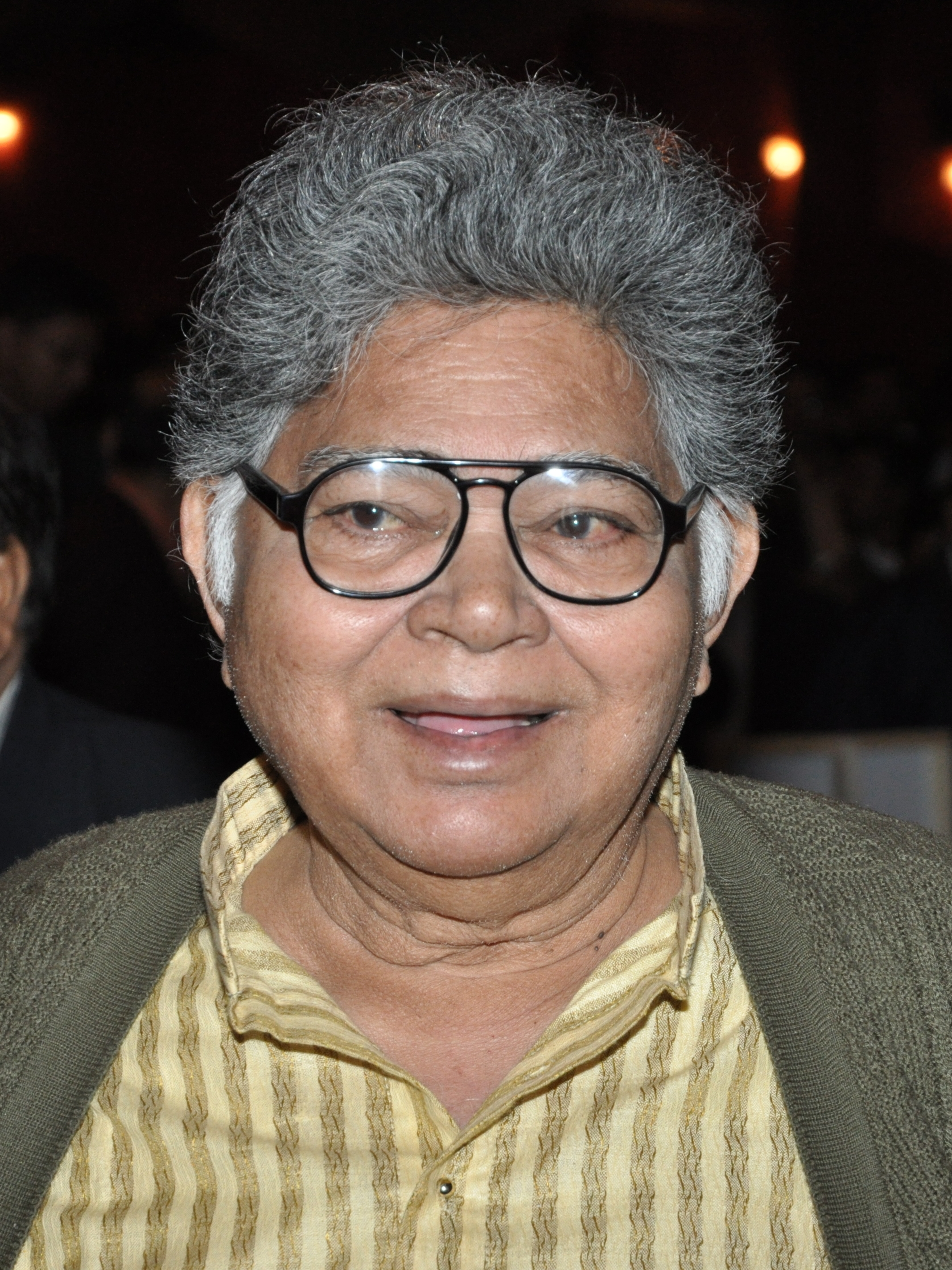
- Gangopadhyay in 2010
- Born: 7 September 1934; Madaripur subdivision, Faridpur district, Bengal Presidency, British India (now in Bangladesh)
- Died: 23 October 2012 (aged 78); Kolkata, West Bengal, India
- Education: University of Calcutta
- Occupations: Poet; novelist; short story writer; historian; journalist
- Spouse: Swati Bandopadhyay (m. 1967)
- Children: Souvik Gangopadhyay (b. 1967)
- Writing career
- Pen name: Nil Lohit, Sanatan Pathak, and Nil Upadhyay
- Language: Bengali
- Period: 1953–2012
- Notable works: Aranyer Din Ratri (novel) (Days and Nights in Forest); First Light (Prathama Alo); Those Days (Sei Somoy); Kakababu
- Notable awards: Ananda Puraskar (1972, 1989); Sahitya Akademi Award (1985)
- Movements: Krittibas; Confessional poetry

Sunil Gangopadhyay (Note: Bengali pronunciation: [ʃunil ɡɔŋɡopad̪ʱːae̯]; anglicized as Sunil Ganguly.) (Bengali pronunciation: [ʃunil ɡɔŋɡopad̪ʱːae̯]; 7 September 1934 – 23 October 2012) was an Indian poet, novelist, short story writer, and critic. He played a key role in modernizing Bengali poetry and co-founded the 1953 avant-garde poetry magazine Krittibas. He has been called the most popular and prolific Bengali writer since Rabindranath Tagore, and "the man who carried the modern consciousness of Bengal."

His debut novel, Atmaprakash (1964), established him as a novelist and was followed by Aranyer Din Ratri. Both were fictionalized account of real-life events. Sei Somoy, a work of historical fiction, marked a major departure from his earlier semi-autobiographical style and was later followed by its sequel, Pratham Alo (1996). His magnum opus, Purba Paschim, dealt with the partition of Bengal. Among his other notable works are the travelogue Payer Tolay Sorshe, published in two volumes, and the poetry collections Eka ebong Koekjon (1958), Ami Ki Rokom Vabe Beche Achi (1966), and Hathat Nirar Janya. The last title refers to his fictional lover, Nira. For children, he created Kakababu, writing 36 novels in the series. He also wrote extensively for Desh magazine and claimed to have written more prose for it than any other writer.

Among others awards, he received the 1985 Sahitya Akademi Award for Those Days (Sei Somoy). Among the films adapted from Sunil's works are, Aranyer Din Ratri and Pratidwandi (both 1970), Sabuj Dwiper Raja (1979), Ek Tukro Chand (2001), Mishawr Rawhoshyo (2013), Yeti Obhijaan (2017), and Kakababur Protyaborton (2022). In 2008, he was elected president of Sahitya Akademi, narrowly defeating the Malayalam writer M.T. Vasudevan Nair.

His simple, clear and conversational approach to prose with dry humor has inspired writers in Bengal and beyond. Shankha Ghosh noted that Sunil’s use of contemporary language let readers see parts of themselves they may have not seen," or "perhaps did not want to see." By doing so, he transformed personal confessions into shared experiences. According to Sitanshu Yashaschandra, Sunil never abandoned the personal for the regional, nor did he forsake his "Bengaliness" to seek a broader identity. "He is a writer of international stature, simply because he is a writer, such a good writer," he wrote.

== Early life ==
He was born in Madaripur in a Bengali Hindu family which is now in Bangladesh. At an early age, he moved to Kolkata from his ancestral town, which became part of East Pakistan after the 1947 Partition of India. He studied at the Surendranath College, Dum Dum Motijheel College, City College, Kolkata – all affiliated with the University of Calcutta. Thereafter, he obtained his master's degree in Bengali from the University of Calcutta in 1954.

He married Swati Banerjee on 26 February 1967. Their only son, Souvik, who stays in Boston, was born on 20 November 1967.

== Literary career ==
=== Krittibas ===
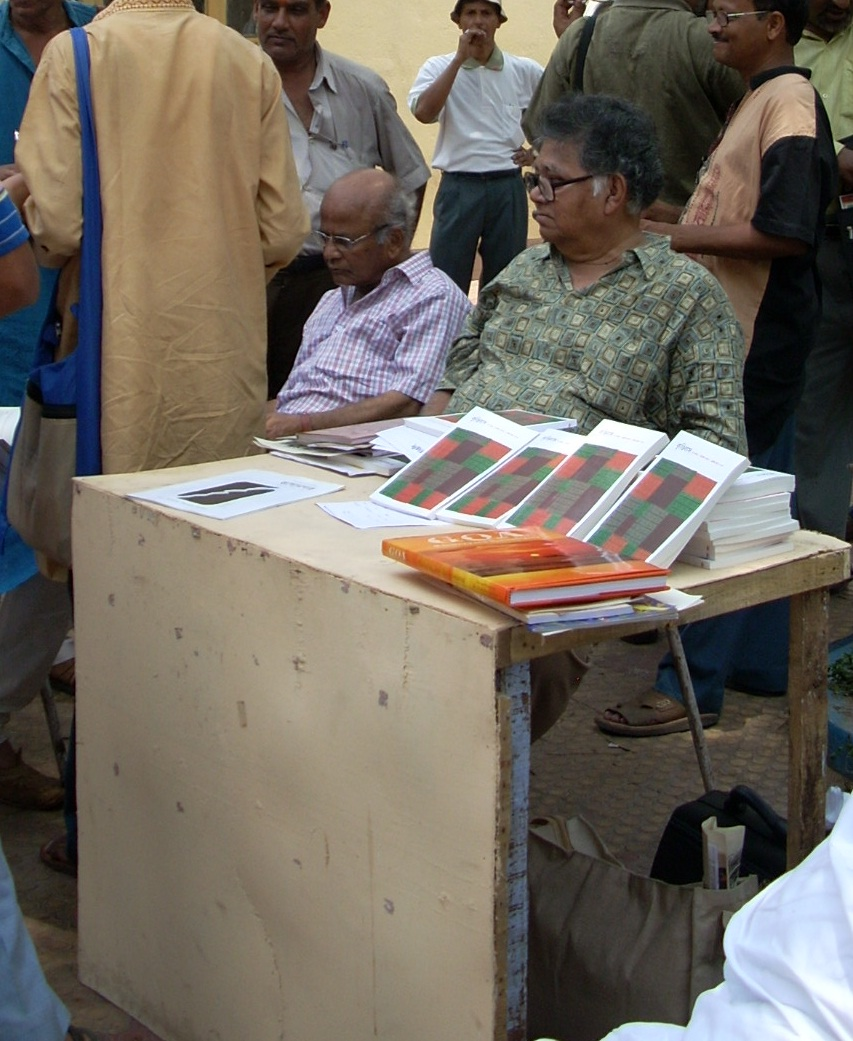
Sunil at the Krittibas stall in Nandan

In 1953, he co-founded the influential avant-grade Bengali magazine Krittibas with Deepak Majumder and Ananda Bagchi. As its editor, he transformed the magazine into a platform for a new generation of poets who experimented with innovative themes, rhythms, and language.The magazine is credited with launching the careers of several later Bengali poets, including Prabal Kumar Basu.

=== Other works ===
Later, he started writing for various publications of the Ananda Bazar group, a major publishing house in Kolkata and has been continuing it for many years. He became a friend of the beat poet Allen Ginsberg while he was travelling in India. Ginsberg mentioned Gangopadhyay most notedly in his poem "September on Jessore Road." Gangopadhyay in return mentioned Ginsberg in some of his prose work. After serving five years as the Vice President, he was elected the President of the Sahitya Akademi on 20 February 2008.

Sunil, along with Tarun Sanyal, Jyotirmoy Datta and Satrajit Dutta had volunteered to be defence witnesses in the famous trial of Hungry generation movement poet Malay Roy Choudhury.

== Works ==
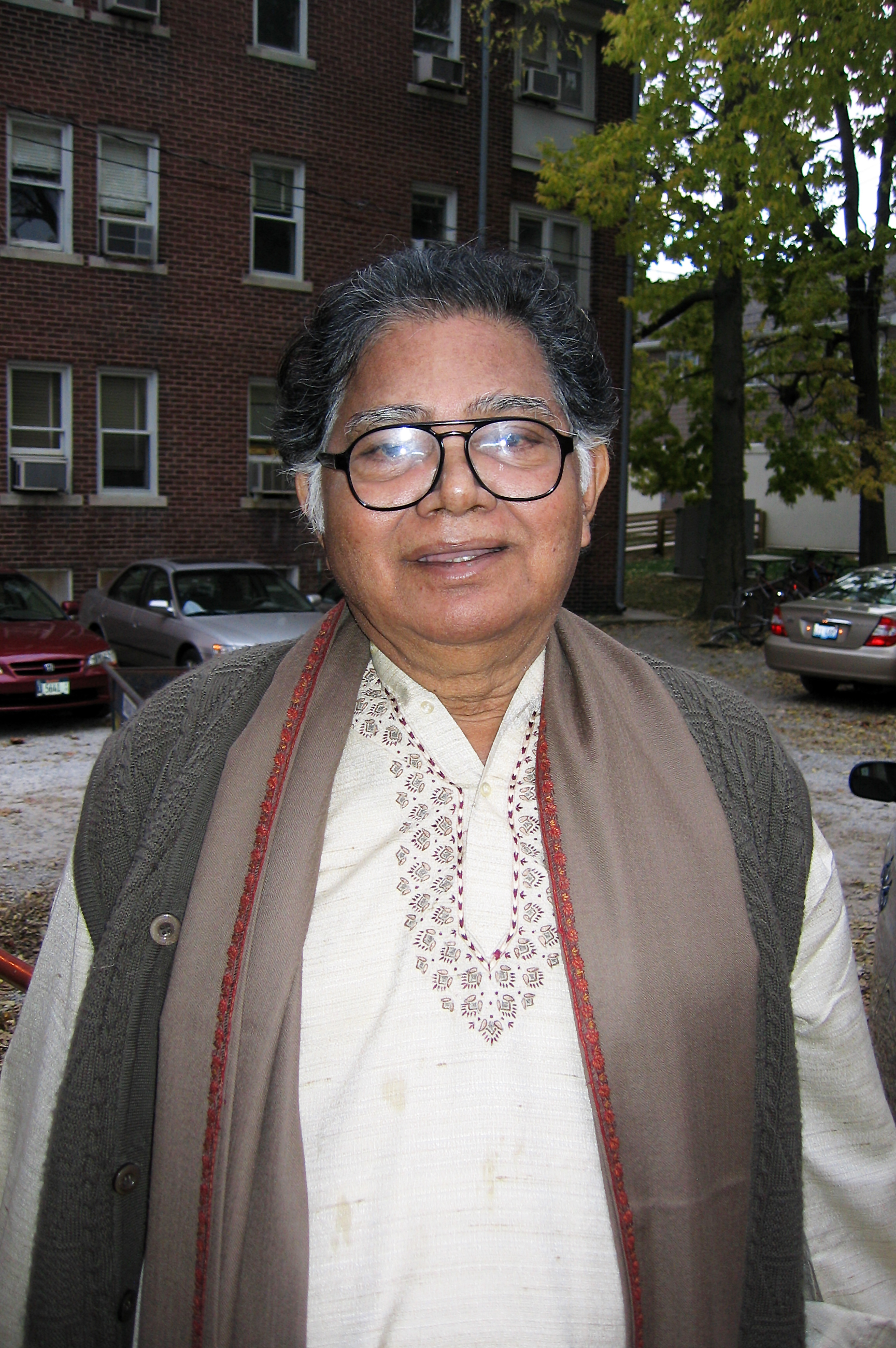
Gangopadhyay in 2006

Author of well over 200 books, Sunil was a prolific writer who has excelled in different genres but declares poetry to be his "first love". His Nikhilesh and Neera series of poems (some of which have been translated as For You, Neera and Murmur in the Woods) have been extremely popular.

As in poetry, Sunil was known for his unique style in prose. His first novel was "Atmaprakash" and it was also the first writing from a newcomer in literature published in the prestigious magazine – Desh (1965). It was critically acclaimed but some controversy arose for its aggressive and 'obscene' style. Sunil said that he was afraid of this novel and went away from Calcutta for a few days.. In an interview session with acclaimed film director Rituparno Ghosh, Sunil Gangopadhyay said that before his marriage, his brother in law after reading the novel 'Atmaprakash' was shocked and thought that Sunil Gangopadhyay was not a good match for his sister. Satyajit Ray thought to make a film on it but it wasn't possible for reasons. The central character of Atmaprakash is a young man of core-calcutta'- Sunil, who leads a bohemian life-style. The novel had inspiration from "On the road" by Jack Kerouac, the beat generation writer. His historical fiction Sei Somoy (translated into English by Aruna Chakravorty as Those Days) received the Indian Sahitya Akademi award in 1985. Sei Somoy continues to be a best seller more than two decades after its first publication. The same is true for Prothom Alo (also translated recently by Aruna Chakravorty as First Light), another best selling historical fiction and Poorba-Pashchim, a raw depiction of the partition and its aftermath seen through the eyes of three generations of Bengalis in West Bengal, Bangladesh and elsewhere. He is also the winner of the Bankim Puraskar (1982), and the Ananda Puraskar (twice, in 1972 and 1989).

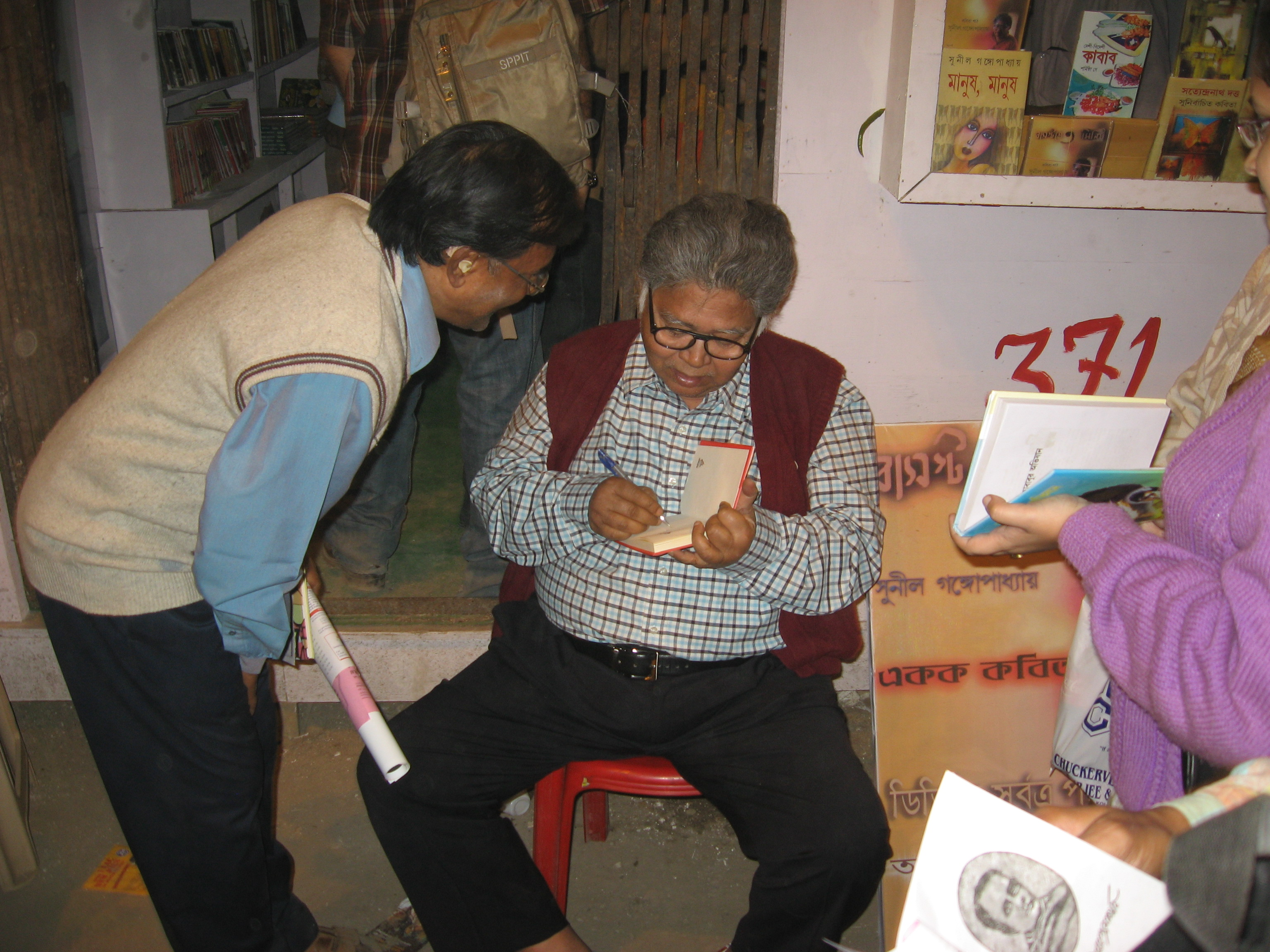
Sunil Gangopadhyay giving autographs to his fans in Kolkata Book Fair 2010

Sunil wrote in many other genres including travelogues, children's fiction, short stories, features, and essays. Among his pen-names are: Nil Lohit, Sanatan Pathak, and Nil Upadhyay.

Though he wrote all types of children's fiction, one character created by him that stands out above the rest, was Kakababu, the crippled adventurist, accompanied by his young adult nephew Santu, and his friend Jojo. Since 1974, Sunil Gangopadhyay wrote over 35 novels of this popular series, most of which appeared in Anandamela magazine.

=== Adaptations of his literary works ===
- Satyajit Ray made two films Pratidwandi and Aranyer Din Ratri based on the works of Ganguly.
- One of Sunil Gangopadhyay's cult poems, Smritir Shohor has been turned into a song for the film Iti Mrinalini (2011) directed by Aparna Sen.
- Seven of his Kakababu series novels have been adapted into big screen—
  - Sabuj Dwiper Raja (1979) directed by Tapan Sinha
  - Kakababu Here Gelen? (1996) directed by Pinaki Chaudhuri
  - Ek Tukro Chand (2001) directed by Pinaki Chaudhuri
  - Mishor Rahasya (2013) directed by Srijit Mukherji
  - Yeti Obhijaan (2017) directed by Srijit Mukherji
  - Kakababur Protyaborton (2021) directed by Srijit Mukherji
  - Vijaynagar'er Hirey (2026) directed by Chandrasish Ray
- Shyamaprasad adapted his novel 'Hirek Deepti' as Malayalam feature Ore Kadal in 2007, and his novel 'Megh Brishti Alo' short story into the 2012 Malayalam film Arike
- The movie Hotath Neerar Jonnyo (2004), is based on Sunil's short story Rani O Abinash.
- The movie Moner Manush (2010), directed by Goutam Ghose a film based on Sunil's novel by the same name which depicts the life of Lalon Fakir, a famous Bengali philosopher and a Baul saint.
- The movie Aparajita Tumi (2012), directed by Aniruddha Roy Chowdhury, is based on Sunil's novel Dui Nari Hate Tarbari.
- Vara: A Blessing (2013), English film directed by Khyentse Norbu, is based on his short story Rakta Aar Kanna (Blood and Tears).
- Yugantar, an Indian television series that aired on DD National in the 80s was based on Gangopadhyay's novel Sei Somoy.

== Death ==
Sunil Gangopadhyay died at 2:05 a.m. on 23 October 2012 at his South Kolkata residence, following a major cardiac arrest. He was suffering from prostate cancer for some time and went to Mumbai for treatment. He returned to Kolkata on the day of Mahalaya. Although he was a communist and an atheist, controversially, Gangopadhyay's body was cremated following Hindu custom on 25 October at Keoratola crematorium with several dignitaries and numerous fans paying their last tributes. Ganguly was not a Hindu or Muslim but a committed atheist.

Pranab Mukherjee, the then-President of India, condoled the death of Gangopadhyay saying:

Gangopadhyay had enriched Bengali literature through his unique style. He was one of the best intellectuals among his contemporaries. The vacuum created by his death cannot be filled.

== Controversies ==
- In 1970, Satyajit Ray's film Pratidwandi, based on the novel of same name by Gangopadhyay, depicted how a poor nurse used to entertain men in exchange of money. This arose controversy and nurses across the city of Kolkata protested against such depiction.
- In 2006 novel Ardhek Jibon, he expressed his carnal desire for Hindu goddess Saraswati created some controversies. A retired IPS officer lodged a case against Gangopadhyay in the Calcutta High Court. Against this controversy Gangpadhyay felt– he had no freedom to express what he felt. Another Bengali writer Buddhadeb Guha found this a cheap gimmick and he told– "I don't support such cheap gimmicks. An author should set an example for the younger generations. If an author thinks it's cool to say that he loves to booze and enjoys going to Sonagachhi, then this only speaks poorly of him."
- In September 2012, Bangladeshi author Taslima Nasreen accused Sunil Gangopadhyay of sexually harassing her and other women. She also alleged that Gangopadhyay was involved in banning her novel Dwikhandito and her "banishment" from West Bengal. Sunil denied the allegation and joked to Subodh Sarkar on his last birthday, "Look, Sunil is dwikhandito (cut in two)." His wife, Swati, backed him as well.

== List of major works ==
=== Poetry or Poems ===
- Hathat Nirar Janya
- Bhorbelar Upohar
- Sada Prishtha tomar sange
- Sei Muhurte Nira
- Kaydata Shikhe Nebe
- Jodi Nirbason Dao
- Pagol Kota

=== Novels ===
- Atmaprakash (1964)
- Sonali Dukkho
- Chaya Darshon
- Anno Jiboner Shad
- Shopno Somvob
- Suniler Satdin
- Rani O Obinash
- Kothay Alo
- Sudur Jhornar Jole
- Jol Jongoler Kabbo
- Ekti Rat Tinti Jibon
- Jomoj Kahini
- Madhu Kahini
- Otyagsahan
- Gonesh Diye Shuru
- Unmochoner Muhurte
- Adhar Raater Atithi
- Aakash Paatal
- Asroy
- Alpona Aar Shikha
- Achena Manush
- Aamar Swapna
- Nadir pare khela
- Satyer Aral
- Eka Ebong Koyekjon
- Sei Somoy
- Pratham Alo
- Poorba-Pashchim
- Hirok Deepthi
- Nihsanga Samrat (2005)
- Moner Manus (2008)
- Bosudha o tar meye (2010)
- Saraswati-r pa-er kacche (2012)
- Radha Krishna (2015)
- Jibon J Rokom
- Payer Tolay Sorshe

=== Autobiography ===
- Ardhek Jibon
- Chabir Deshe, Kabitar Deshe

=== Travelogue ===
- "Bijone Nijer Sathe"
- "Amader Choto Nadee"
- "Tin Samudro Satash Nadee"

==== "Kakababu" series ====
- Sabuj Dwiper Raja
- Kakababu O Sindukrahasya
- Kakababu O Bajralama
- Santu Kothay, Kakababu Kothay
- Vijaynagarer Hire
- Jangaler Modhe Ek Hotel
- Bhayankar Sundoor
- Santu O Ak Tukro Chand
- Kakababu Herey Gelen?
- Kolkatar Jongole
- Bhopal Rahashya
- Pahar Churae Atanka
- Khali Jahajer Rohosyo
- Agun Pakhir Rohoshyo
- Kakababu Bonam Chorashikari
- "Sadhubabar haat(Short Story)"
- Ulka Rahoshsho
- Kakababu O Ek Chhodmobeshi
- Ebar Kakababur Protishodh
- Mishor Rohoshsho(Mystery in Egypt)
- Kakababu O Ashchorjo Dweep
- Agneyogirir peter madhye
- Kakababu O Jaladashu
- Golokdhandhay Kakababu
- Kakababu Samagra (1–6)
- Kakababu O Chadan Dossu

=== Translated books ===
- First Light ISBN 978-0-14-100430-3
- Those days ISBN 0140268529
- East-West Penguin Books India
- The Lovers and other stories ISBN 81-7189-838-6
- Pratidwandi ISBN 81-250-1902-2
- Murmur in the Woods ISBN 81-220-0568-3
- The Youth ISBN 81-291-0125-4
- Ranu O Bhanu Translated by Sheila Sengupta
- The Lonely Monarch Translated by Swapna Dutta, ISBN 978-93-5009-628-4
- Blood Translated by Debali Mookerjea-Leonard

== Awards and honours ==
=== Awards ===
- 1972: Ananda Puraskar in general category
- 1979: "National poet" honour was given by Akashbani Kolkata
- 1983: Bankim Puraskar for the book Sei Somoy
- 1984: Sahitya Akademi Award for the book Sei Somoy
- 1989: Ananda Puraskar for the book Poorba-Pashchim
- 1989: Sahitya Setu puroskar
- 1999: Annada-Snowcem puroska for the story Nil Lohiter Golpo
- 2003: Annadashankar puroskar
- 2004: Saraswati Samman for Prothom Alo
- 2011: The Hindu Literary Prize, shortlist, The Fakir
- 2012: Sera Bangali Lifetime Achievement Award by Star Ananda

=== Honors ===
- 2002: Sheriff of Kolkata.
- Honorary D.Litt. from the University of Burdwan

== See also ==
- List of Indian writers
