= Chena Achena (1983 film) =

1983 Indian Bengali film

- Directed by: Pinaki Chaudhuri
- Starring: Soumitra Chatterjee; Amol Palekar; Biplab Chatterjee; Tanuja; Chhaya Debi
- Music by: Abhijit Bandyopadhyay
- Production company: Rajasree Chitram
- Release date: 1 January 1983
- Country: India
- Language: Bengali

Chena Achena is a 1983 Bengali drama film directed by Pinaki Chaudhuri. The music of the film was composed by Abhijit Bandyopadhyay.

== Cast ==
- Soumitra Chatterjee
- Amol Palekar
- Biplab Chatterjee
- Tanuja
- Chhaya Debi
- Nandini Maliya
- Nirmal Ghosh

== Soundtrack ==
- "Amay Rakhte Jodi" – Hemanta Mukherjee
- "Shono Shono" – Hemanta Mukherjee
- "O Amar Sona Bondhure" – Hemanta Mukherjee
- "Koto Swapna Chhilo" – Aarti Mukherjee
- "Eki Path Jeno" – Hemanta Mukherjee
- "Jouban Palashe Agun" – Aarti Mukherjee
