= Kodimalar =

1966 film by C. V. Sridhar

- Theatrical release poster
- Directed by: C. V. Sridhar
- Screenplay by: C. V. Sridhar
- Story by: Debnarayan Gupta
- Produced by: S. L. Nahaatha; A. K. Balasubramanian
- Starring: Muthuraman; R. Vijayakumari
- Cinematography: Balu
- Edited by: N. M. Shankar
- Music by: M. S. Viswanathan
- Production company: Sree Productions
- Distributed by: Rajshri Productions
- Release date: 4 March 1966
- Running time: 157 minutes
- Country: India
- Language: Tamil

Kodimalar is a 1966 Indian Tamil-language drama film written and directed by C. V. Sridhar. The film stars Muthuraman and R. Vijayakumari, with A. V. M. Rajan, Nagesh, M. V. Rajamma and Kanchana in supporting roles. It is a remake of the Bengali film Shyamali (1956), itself based on Debnarayan Gupta's play of the same name. The film was released on 4 March 1966 and failed commercially.

== Plot ==
Lakshmi, a mute woman, faces numerous troubles with her mother-in-law.

== Cast ==
Male cast

- Muthuraman as Ramu
- A. V. M. Rajan as Thambi Durai
- Nagesh as Annamalai

Female cast

- R. Vijayakumari as Lakshmi
- M. V. Rajamma as Ramu's mother
- Kanchana as Parvathi

== Production ==
Although the Bengali film Shyamali (1956), based on Debnarayan Gupta's play of the same name, was a box-office failure, C. V. Sridhar still decided to adapt the story in Tamil. The remake, titled Kodimalar, was produced by Sree Productions and directed by Sridhar who also wrote the screenplay. Cinematography was handled by Balu, and editing by N. M. Shankar. Filming was suspended, but resumed in October 1965 after six months.

== Soundtrack ==
The music was composed by M. S. Viswanathan, with lyrics by Kannadasan. The song Mouname Paarvayaal is based on raga Tilak Kamod.

Song	Singers	Length
"Malare Nee Solla"	P. Susheela	03:25
"Mouname Paarvayaal"	P. B. Sreenivas	04:04
"Kannadi Meniyadi"	L. R. Eswari, P. Susheela	03:23
"Kalathu Metta"	A. L. Raghavan, L. R. Eswari	
"Chittaga Thulli Thulli"	T. M. Soundararajan, P. Susheela	04:59
"Kaanakathai Thedi Indru"	Sirkazhi Govindarajan	03:17

== Release and reception ==
Kodimalar was released on 4 March 1966, and distributed by Rajshri Productions. On 12 March 1966, The Indian Express wrote, "The main defect with the film is that its characters and incidents are so strikingly similar to those seen in some previous Tamil movies that we do not feel like viewing a new film." Writing for Sport and Pastime, T. M. Ramachandran wrote "The delineation of the story follows the conventional pattern. The direction by Sridhar is uninspiring in the first half of the film, in which they are dull patches though it improves in the second". Kalki said Vijayakumari's performance salvaged the film's flaws. The film was commercially unsuccessful.
