= Pinaki Chaudhuri =

Indian academic and film director (1940–2022)

Pinaki Chaudhuri পিনাকী চৌধুরী
- Born: 19 September 1940; Calcutta, Bengal Province, British Raj
- Died: 24 October 2022 (aged 82)
- Occupation: Director
- Years active: 1980–2022

Pinaki Chaudhuri পিনাকী চৌধুরী (19 September 1940 – 24 October 2022) was an Indian academic and film director.

Chaudhuri started his career as a tabla player, trained by Ustad Kermatullah Khan and accompanied the Legend Pandit Ravi Shankar in London. Chaudhuri's academic career spanned from studying Physics at Jadavpur University culminating in exposure to Electrical engineering course at London University.

He entered the film world initially as a producer and subsequently as a director. His journey as a filmmaker included several acclaimed telefilms and feature films. He was awarded with two National Awards for the Best Feature Film in Bengali, first one in 1996 for Shonghaath and again in 2007 for Ballygunge Court. Chowdhury was honoured as Jury Member in various Film Festivals and was the Chairman of the Jury Board for selection of Indian films for National Awards.

Chaudhuri died from cancer on 24 October 2022, at the age of 82.

== Filmography ==
As director

- Chena Achena (1983)
- Sanghat (1996)
- Kakababu Here Gelen? (1995)
- Ek Tukro Chand (2001)
- Ballygunge Court (2007)
- Arohan (2010) also writer.
