= Chowky (film) =

Chowky चौकी
- Directed by: Shekhar (Kitu) Ghosh
- Produced by: Bunty Walia; Juspreet Singh Walia
- Starring: Sandhya Mridul; Raja Chaudhary; Yudhishtir Urs
- Cinematography: Vikash Nowlakha
- Music by: Sonu Nigam; Bickram Ghosh; Arjit Dutta; Bapi Tutul; Lyrics; Sanjeev Tiwari
- Release date: October 2016
- Country: India
- Language: Hindi

Chowky is a 2016 Hindi-language thriller film directed by Shekhar (Kitu) Ghosh. The film is produced by Bunty Walia and Jaspreet Singh Walia under the banner G S Entertainment Pvt Ltd. The film stars Sandhya Mridul, Raja Chaudhary and Yudhishtir Urs.

== Plot ==
Chowky, a suspense thriller, is a story of one night between two strangers with a lot of twists and turns. The film revolves around a criminal (Yudhistir Urs) and a sub-inspector (played by ex - NSG officer Dipanjan Chakraborty), over an eventful night, in a Chowky (police station) where fate has got the two together.

== Cast ==
- Sandhya Mridul
- Raja Chaudhary
- Yudhishtir Urs
- Dipanjan Chakraborty

== Music ==
Composer duo Sonu Nigam - Bickram Ghosh have composed a promotional song for Chowky. They have previously composed music for Jal and Sooper Se Ooper.

Music composer duo Bapi Tutul have composed 2 songs in the film and composer Arjit Dutta has composed 1 song in the film.

Singer Sunidhi Chauhan has sung a song in the film titled Khanjar Ki Dhar.

== Soundtrack ==
Track #	Song	Singer(s)	Lyrics	Composer(s)
1	Chowky (Title Song)	?????	?????	Sonu Nigam - Bickram Ghosh
2	Zindagi Adhjali	Shashanka Ghosh	Sanjeev Tiwari	Bapi Tutul
3	Chhoo Le	?????	Sanjeev Tiwari	Bapi Tutul
4	Khanjar Ki Dhar	Sunidhi Chauhan	?????	Arjit Dutta
