= Ankur Sharma =

Ankur Sharma may refer to:

- Ankur Sharma (politician), founder of the political party Ikkjutt Jammu
- Ankur Sharma, a Hong Kong cricketer also known as Ankur Vasishta
- Ankur Sharma, an actor in the 2021 film Shershaah
- Ankur Sharma, a fictional character in the 2008 film Via Darjeeling
