= Trahimam =

2022 Indian Hindi-language film

- Official Poster of Trahimam
- Directed by: Dushyant Pratap Singh
- Produced by: Faheem R. Qureshi; Neetu Tiwari; Sumendra Tiwari
- Starring: Arshi Khan; Pankaj Berry; Mushtaq Khan
- Cinematography: Suhas Rao
- Edited by: Sunil Yadav; Anil Yadav
- Music by: Piyush Ranjan
- Distributed by: Dushyant Pratap Singh
- Release date: 16 December 2022
- Country: India
- Language: Hindi

Trahimam is an Indian Hindi-language drama film directed by Dushyant Pratap Singh. The film stars Arshi Khan, Pankaj Berry, Mushtaq Khan and Adi Irani. The trailer of the film was released on November 1, 2022.

== Cast ==
- Arshi Khan
- Pankaj Berry
- Adi Irani
- Mushtaq Khan
- Raju Kher
- Ekta Jain

== Plot ==
The film revolves around village girl named Champa, played by Arshi Khan. It is shown in the movie how she was raped and political powers escape rapist and all the criminals.

== Soundtrack ==
Trahimam

Soundtrack album by Piyush Ranjan
- Genre: Film soundtrack
- Label: Dushyant Corporation
- Producer: Faheem R. Qureshi; Neetu Tiwari; Sumendra Tiwari

The Music and background score were composed by Piyush Ranjan and the lyrics were penned by Manish Muradiya .

All lyrics are written by Manish Muradiya; all music is composed by Piyush Ranjan.

Track Listing
No.	Title	Features	Length
1.	Untitled	Arshi Khan

== Filming ==
The film is mostly shot in Mumbai, Maharashtra, Agra, Uttar Pradesh and mainly in Rajasthan.
