= Main Mulayam Singh Yadav =

Hindi-language biographical film on political leader

- Directed by: Suvendu Raj Ghosh
- Produced by: Meena Sethi Mondal
- Starring: Amyth Sethi
- Production company: Ms Production
- Release date: 29 January 2021
- Running time: 146 minutes
- Country: India
- Language: Hindi

Main Mulayam Singh Yadav (transl. I am Mulayam Singh Yadav) is a 2021 Indian Hindi-language biographical film directed by Suvendu Raj Ghosh. The film shows the political journey of Mulayam Singh Yadav. Produced by Meena Sethi Mondal, it stars Amyth Sethi, Govind Namdeo, Mukesh Tiwari, Prakash Belawadi, Supriya Karnik, Sayaji Shinde, Rajkumar Kanojia, Zarina Wahab, Anupam Shyam, and Mimoh Chakraborty. This film was initially set to release on 14 August 2020 but was postponed to 2 October. The film release was further delayed due to the COVID-19 pandemic and was theatrical released on 29 January 2021.

== Cast ==
- Amyth Sethi as Mulayam Singh Yadav
- Sana Amin Sheikh as Malti Devi Yadav
- Govind Namdeo as Charan Singh
- Mukesh Tiwari as Nathuram
- Prakash Belawadi as Ram Manohar Lohia
- Supriya Karnik as Indira Gandhi
- Kiran Jhangiani as Sanjay Gandhi
- Ranojoy Bishnu as Ajit Singh
- Sayaji Shinde as Advocate Lakhan Singh
- Rajkumar Kanojia as Darshan Singh
- Mimoh as Shivpal Singh Yadav
- Prerna Sethi Mandal as Sarla Devi Yadav
- Gopal Singh as Ram Gopal Yadav
- Zarina Wahab as Mulayam Singh Yadav's mother
- Anupam Shyam as Mulayam Singh Yadav's father
- Debdas as Ramroop
- Vimal Bhatia as D. K. Barooah
- Chittrali Das as Kamla Devi Yadav/Chutki (Mulayam Singh Yadav's sister)
- Mahima Gupta as Maya Tyagi
- Harshat Miami as Siddhartha Shankar Ray
