= Dushyant Pratap Singh =

Indian film director

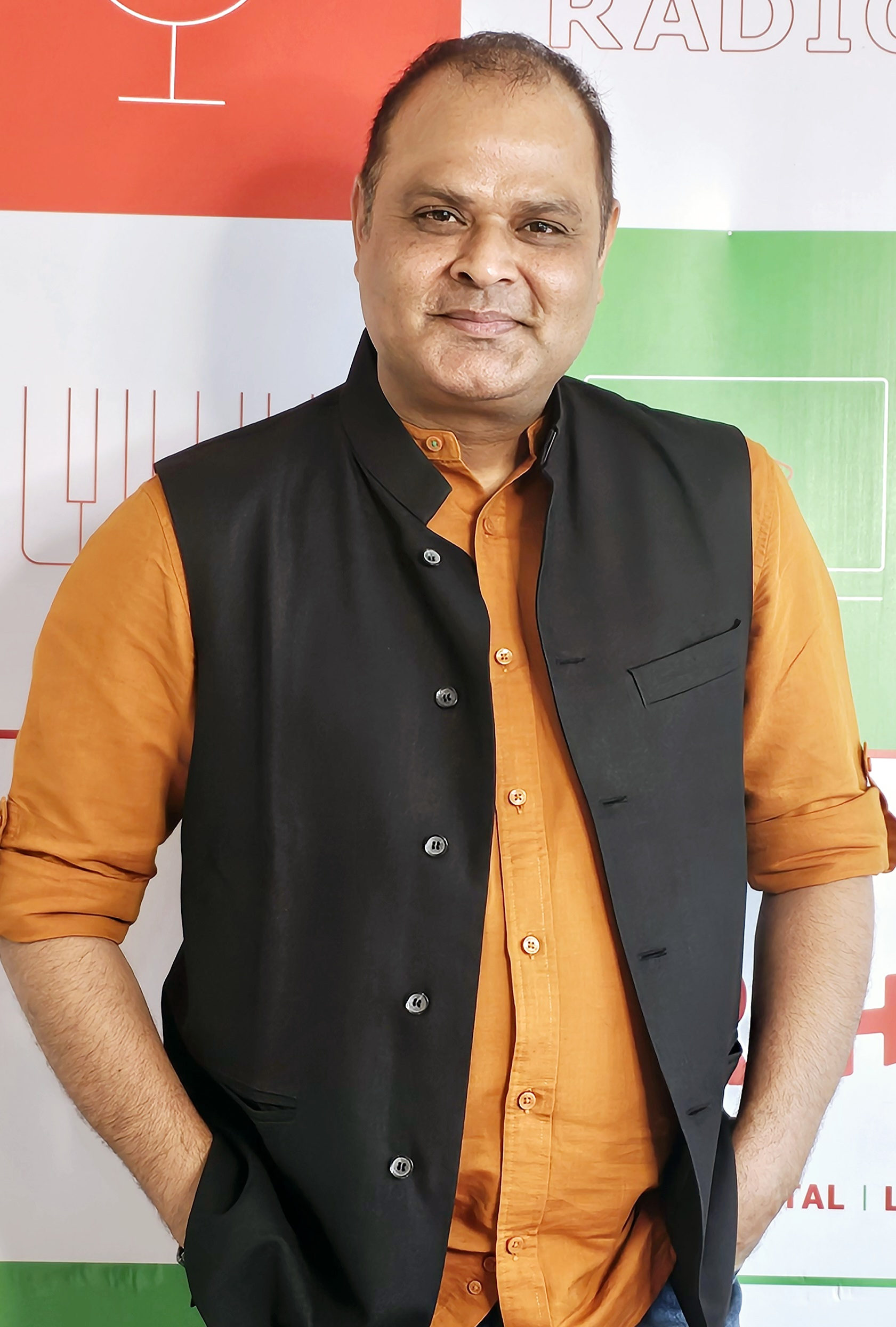
- Born: Dushyant Singh; 1 July 1977 (age 48); Agra, Uttar Pradesh, India
- Occupations: Film director Author
- Years active: 2020
- Known for: Trahimam
- Spouse: Ritu Singh
- Children: Vishnupriya Singh (daughter); Riddhima Singh (daughter)

Dushyant Pratap Singh (born 1 July 1977) is an Indian film director and screenwriter who mainly works in the Hindi cinema industry. Singh has directed actors like Daisy Shah, Rashmi Desai and Arshi Khan. Recently he directed the film Zindagi Shatranj Hai starring Hiten Tejwani.

== Early life and career ==
Singh was born and raised in Agra, a city of Uttar Pradesh, India. He completed his schooling from his hometown only before attending Dr. Bhimrao Ambedkar University. He started his career by directing the reality show, Dharm Ki Baat, with Swami Chakrapani and others. Later, he directed some music albums and then feature film The Hundred Bucks which is written by his daughter Vishnupriya Singh and TVc with Daisy Shah became the turning point for his directorial career and he earned films like Trahimam and Zindagi Shatranj Hai. Zindagi Shatranj Hai was released on MX player on 17 March 2023.

== Filmography ==
Key
| † | Denotes films that have not yet been released |

| Year | Film | Notes |
|---|---|---|
| 2020 | The Hundred Bucks | Released on 21 February 2020 |
| 2022 | Trahimam | stars Arshi Khan, Pankaj Berry, Raju Kher |
| 2023 | Zindagi Shatranj Hai | stars Hiten Tejwani |
| 2023 | I Am Unused | stars Mushtaq Khan |
| 2023 | Eradicated† | Making |
| 2023 | Untitled† | stars Rashmi Desai |
| 2024 | Laal Ayodhya† | Making |

== Discography ==
| Year | Title | Notes |
|---|---|---|
| 2020 | Mera Ishq Tu | Dushyant Pratap Singh |
| 2020 | Monalisa | Dushyant Pratap Singh Santoskh Singh |
| 2020 | Mumbai Meri Jaan | Dushyant Pratap Singh |
| 2020 | Fukkarwali Night Hai | Dushyant Pratap Singh |
| 2020 | Ishq Parinda | Director |
| 2020 | Chandigarh Ki Chamakti Rani | Stars Ruslaan Mumtaz |
| 2022 | Gadbad Gadbad | Stars Daler Mehndi |
| 2023 | Badnaam Na Kar Dena | Movie Zindagi Shatranj Hai |
| 2025 | Jai Kailasha | sung by Dushyant Pratap Singh & Sanjeevani |

== Books ==
| Year | Book | Notes |
|---|---|---|
| 2024 | Satyaki Dwapar Ka Ajey Yodha | based on Satyaki |

== TV commercial ==
- Indira Gas TVc with Daisy Shah

== Awards ==
- Standard degree of Vidhavachaspati by Vikramshila Hindi Vidyapeeth
- Indo-Sri Lanka Bond Awards
