= Suvendu Ghosh =

Indian film director

Suvendu Raj Ghosh
- Born: West Bengal
- Education: B. Com
- Occupations: Film director; Screenwriter
- Years active: 2003-present

Suvendu Raj Ghosh is an Indian Bengali and Hindi film director. His many films have included Chase No Time to Crime (2019), Main Mulayam Singh Yadav (2021), Before You Die (2022),Kusum Ka Biyaah (2024) and Kapal (film).

His accolades include the best Debutante Film Director Award at the 2016 Goa International Film Festival in Dubai.

== Early life ==
Ghosh was born in a Bengali family in West Bengal. He was formerly a police officer in Kolkata under the Kolkata Police Crime Branch. But he claimed voluntary retirement in 2016 to pursue a full time career in directing films.

== Film career ==
Ghosh started his filmmaking career in 2003 and has directed more than 450 music videos. He has directed in different languages including Hindi, Bengali, Nepali. His debut film as a film director was Abelay Gorom Bhaat. By the year 2007 Ghosh had directed 10 films in different languages.

Ghosh has won many awards for his film Chetana (2015). His Shunyata was India's first film on the 2016 banknote demonetisation. He started filming on 26 November 2016, just 18 days after demonetisation was announced by Prime Minister Narendra Modi.

Ghosh also directed the biopic of ex chief minister of Uttar Pradesh, Mulayam Singh Yadav, the film Main Mulayam Singh Yadav received appreciation and the film won awards. Ghosh has also directed Before You Die, which is dedicated to the cancer suffering families. The film won many awards and it was appealed by the audience. Ghosh last movie was the 2024 film Kusum Ka Biyaah, which is based on the lockdown situation.

== Filmography ==
Key
†	Denotes films that have not yet been released

Year	Film	Director	Writer	Language	Notes	Ref.
2007	Abelay Goram Bhat	Yes	No	Bengali	Directorial debut in a feature film	
2011	Bhay	Yes	—N/a	Bengali		
2015	Chetona	Yes	—N/a	Bengali		
2013	Everyday is Sunday	Yes	Yes	Nepali	Debut Nepali film	
2017	Shunyata	Yes	Yes	Bengali		
2018	Two Story	Yes	No	Bengali		
2019	Chase No Mercy To Crime	Yes	Yes	Hindi	Debut Hindi film	
2021	Main Mulayam Singh Yadav	Yes	No	Hindi		
2022	Before You Die	Yes	No	Hindi		
2024	Kusum Ka Biyaah	Yes	No	Hindi		
2024	Sesh Jibon	Yes	No	Bengali		
2025	Kapal	Yes	Yes	Bengali		
2026	I am Jit Bahadur	Yes	Yes	Nepali		
