= Juspreet Singh Walia =

Indian film producer and director

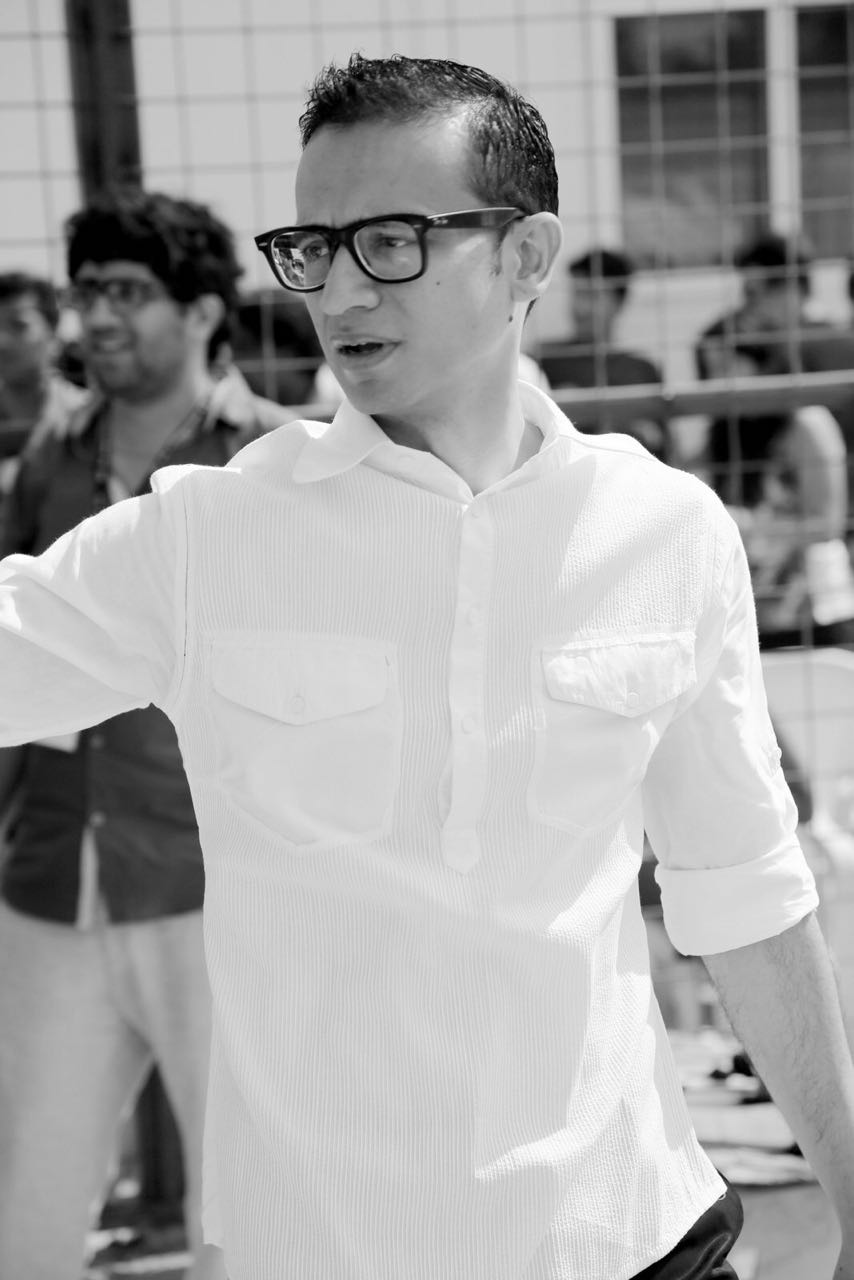
Juspreet Singh Walia

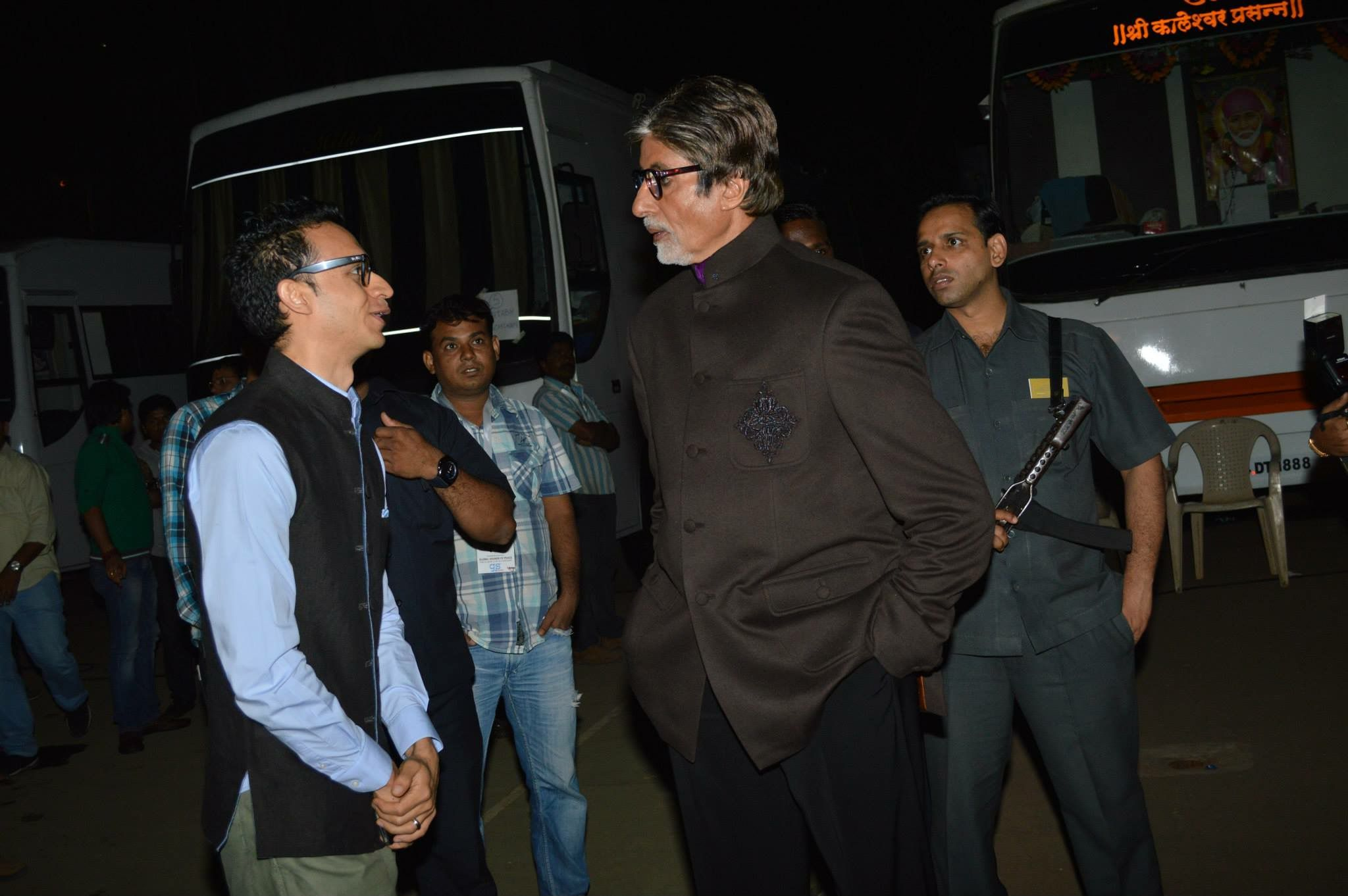
Juspreet Singh Walia and Amitabh Bachchan

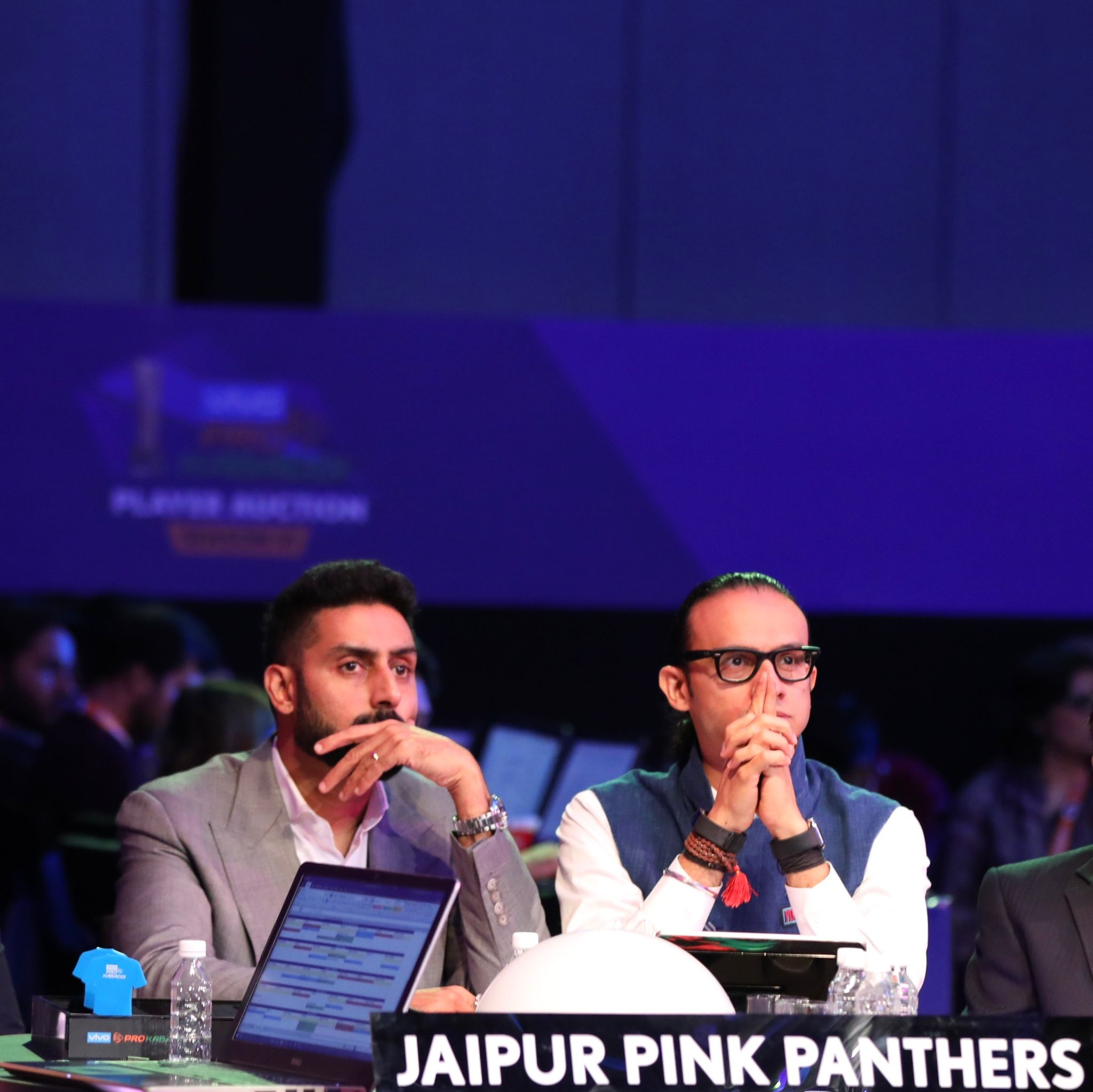
Juspreet Singh Walia and Abhishek Bachchan at a Jaipur Pink Panthers match

Juspreet Singh Walia (born 30 August 1979), often informally referred to as Jus, is an Indian film producer, assistant director, restaurateur, celebrity manager, entrepreneur and a yogi who is primarily known for his work in Hindi films. He is the son of Arvind Walia and Pirthipal Singh Walia and brother of Bunty Walia.

== Early and personal life ==
Juspreet Singh Walia was born in Mumbai, India. He studied at Arya Vidya Mandir and attended Sydenham College of Commerce and Economics, both in Mumbai. He then attended Purdue University, West Lafayette and Drexel University, PA and worked at SAP America, Newtown Square and then moved to Carlin Equities, New York. Post his education and work experience in the USA, he moved to Bollywood as a producer with GS Entertainment Worldwide.

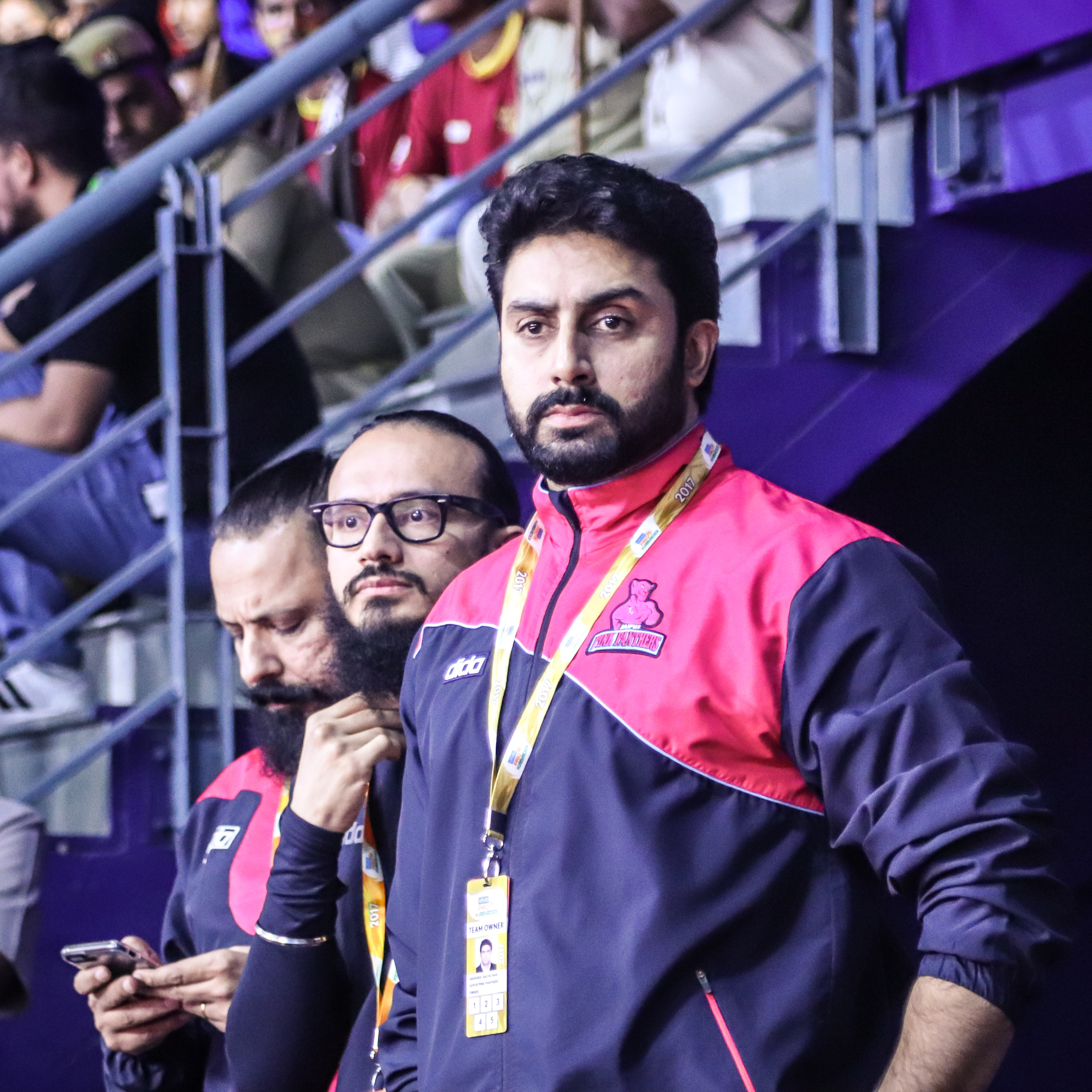
Abhishek Bachchan, Juspreet Singh Walia, Bunty Walia at a Jaipur Pink Panthers match, 2017.

== Career ==
=== Producer ===
Walia entered the film industry as a producer under the GS Entertainment banner, with the movie Ek Ajnabee (2005), starring Amitabh Bachchan, Arjun Rampal and Perizaad Zorabian. He later produced Lamhaa: The Untold Story of Kashmir (2008) and Chowky (2018). He has co-produced Sorry Bhai! (2008) and Shab (2017) both directed by Onir.

=== Assistant director ===
As assistant director, Juspreet has worked on Aziz Mirza’s Kismat Konnection (2008) starring Shahid Kapoor and Vidya Balan.

=== Yoga teacher ===
Juspreet is a Registered Yoga Teacher (RYT) with Yoga Alliance which acknowledges the completion of a yoga teacher training with a Registered Yoga School (RYS). He is certified in and teaches three forms of yoga.

=== Celebrity and Event Manager ===
Apart from producing and co-producing blockbusters with GS Worldwide Entertainment for over two decades, Juspreet helps manage Bollywood actor - Abhishek Bachchan's kabaddi team The Jaipur Pink Panthers- as well as stadium operations for Chennaiyin FC - the football club whose owners include Abhishek Bachchan and former captain of India’s cricket team - Mahendra Singh Dhoni. The charitable All Stars Football Club that is spearheaded by several icons like Ranbir Kapoor, Dino Morea, Arjun Kapoor, Abhishek Bachhan etc. is also owned and managed by GS Entertainment.

Over the years, Juspreet has helped the company organise 200+ events featuring performances by celebrities such as Kareena Kapoor, Salman Khan, Shahrukh Khan, Rahul Dravid, Lata Mangeshkar and A.R. Rehman. In addition, the company represents several celebrities from the Indian entertainment industry, including some exclusively - like Lara Dutta and Manasi Scott.

In 2016, he founded a company aimed to build a global community for like minded people called YogaFoodLove and The Gratitude Company.

Jus is also a restaurateur and owner of a speakeasy bar - Please Don't Tell (PDT) and a QSR, The Roll Company (TRC), both located in Mumbai.

== Filmography ==
Year	Film	Producer	Co-Producer	Assistant Director
2021	Mosagallu	Yes		
2020	Romeo Akbar Walter	Yes		
2018	Chowky	Yes		
2017	Shab		Yes	
2010	Lamhaa: The Untold Story of Kashmir	Yes		
2008	Sorry Bhai!		Yes	
2008	Kismat Konnection			Yes
2005	Ek Ajnabee	Yes		
