= Kusum Ka Biyaah =

- Directed by: Suvendu Raj Ghosh
- Story by: Vikash Dubey; Sandip Dubey
- Produced by: Pradip Chopra; Balwant Purohit
- Starring: Lovekansh Garg; Sujana Darjee; Raja Sarkar; Suhani Biswas; Pradip Chopra
- Cinematography: Sourav Banerjee
- Edited by: Raj Sindhu Sidhu
- Music by: Bhanu Pratap Singh
- Release date: 1 March 2024
- Country: India
- Language: Hindi

Kusum Ka Biyaah is a 2024 Indian Hindi film based on a true story.

== Synopsis ==
The plot revolves around Sunil's marriage, which faces numerous challenges. Just as the family members are excited about the wedding, a nationwide lockdown is imposed due to the COVID-19 pandemic. This results in the entire wedding party getting stuck at Sunil's father-in-law's place in Bihar.

== Cast ==
- Lovekansh Garg
- Sujana Darjee
- Raja Sarkar
- Suhani Biswas
- Pradip Chopra

== Production ==
It is produced by Pradip Chopra and Balwant Purohit under the banners of I Lead Films, Balwant Purohit Media, and SRG Films. The film is directed by Suvendu Raj Ghosh, with the story, screenplay, and dialogue written by Vikash Dubey and Sandip Dubey. The film's music is composed by Bhanu Pratap Singh, with lyrics also written by Bhanu Pratap Singh. The cinematography is handled by Sourav Banerjee, and the editing is done by Raj Singh Sidhu. The costumes are designed by Debjani Ghosh, while the executive producer is Chandan Sahoo.

== Reception ==
A critic from The Times of India rated the film two-and-a-half out of five stars and wrote that "Kusum Ka Biyaah emerges as a poignant commentary on the societal challenges, bureaucratic intricacies, and the indomitable resilience of individuals facing adversity".
