= Sanjeevani (singer) =

Indian singer

Sanjeevani Bhelande
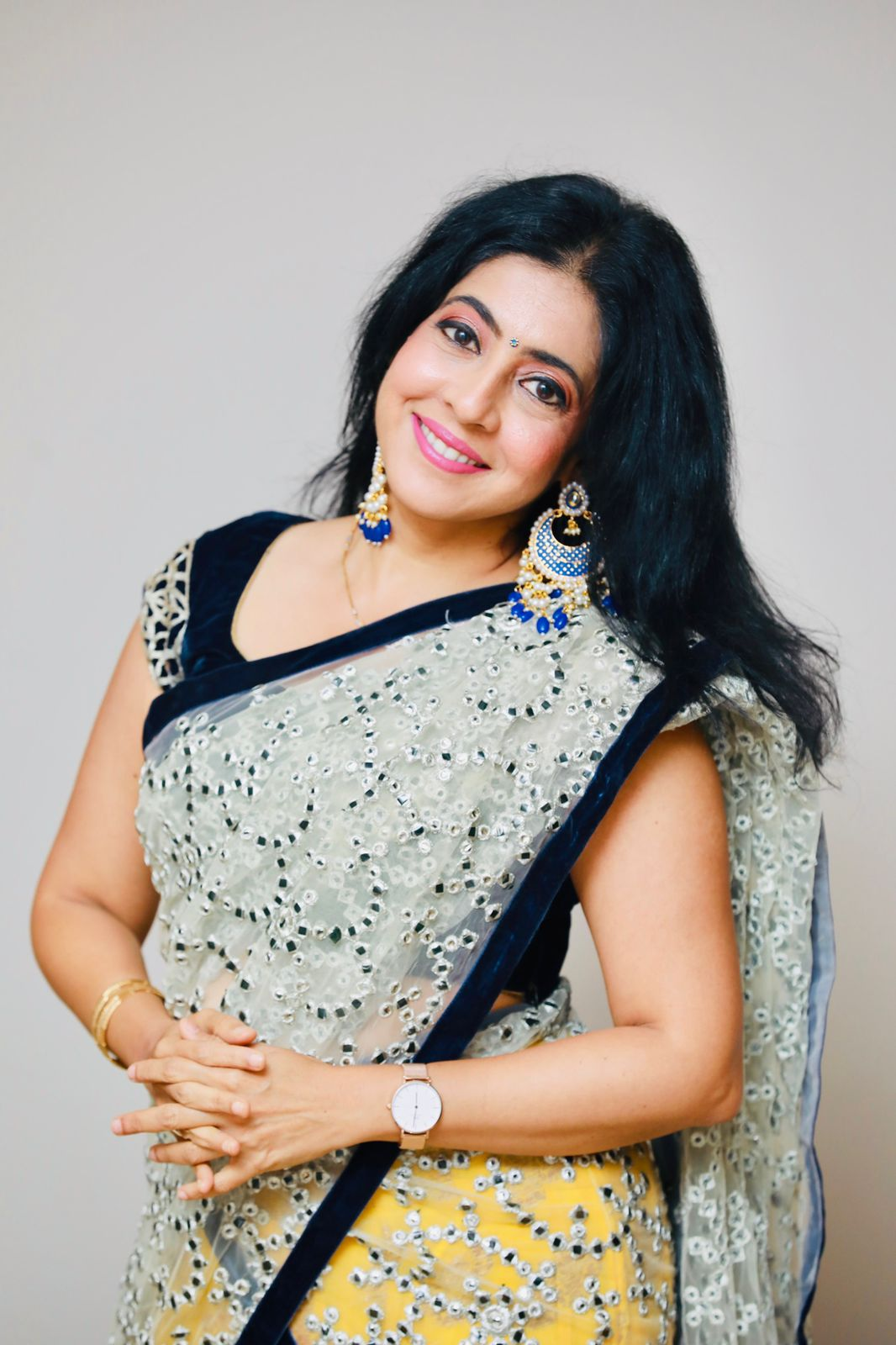
- Sanjeevani in 2021

Background information
- Born: Maharashtra, India
- Genres: Bollywood music Hindustani classical
- Occupation: Singer
- Years active: 1995–present

Sanjeevani Bhelande is an Indian singer. She is known for her songs from movie Kareeb, Nikamma kiya, her English book and album Meera and me and has given over 2000 live concerts.

== Personal life ==
Sanjeevani comes from a family of academics. Her father was the Director of Education for the Maharashtra government, as well as a professor of Sanskrit. Her mother was a professor of English, and her sister holds a doctorate in English Literature. Sanjeevani, herself, holds a degree in music (Sangeet Visharad), and is trained in Odissi and Kathak classical-dance forms. She holds a master's degree in commerce and a diploma in Mass Communication.

== Career ==
Sanjeevani has to her credit several original Hindi film songs like Chori Chori Jab Nazrein Mili, Nikamma Kiya, Uljhanon Ko De Diya, Makhmali Yeh Badan, Chidiya Tu Hoti, Churalo Na Dil Mera Sanam, Haan Judaise and Tum Juda Hokar. She won the Best Playback Singer Ashirwad Award in 1999 for Chori Chori Jab Nazrein Mili and was a Filmfare and Screen nominee for Churalo Na Dil Mera Sanam. Sanjeevani is the first ever winner of Zee TV's "Sa Re Ga Ma" and the first to have been selected for playback in Hindi films from a talent show. Music director Khayyam adjudged her the winner in the 1995 finals of the first season and she was invited by filmmaker Vidhu Vinod Chopra to sing five songs for his film Kareeb.

Sanjeevani's album and book ‘Meera and Me’ is a genre in itself. She has sung, translated and composed Mirabai’s songs in English.

Sanjeevani has created another unique album ‘Raag in a song’. These are classical based songs. Bandishes recorded in the song format. Her songs Ghar Jane De and Latt Uljhi have been appreciated.

== Discography ==
This list includes popular songs sung by Sanjeevani in various movies, especially in Hindi and Nepali, from 1995 onward.

Year	Movie	Song title	Language	Composer(s)	Lyricist(s)	Co-Artist(s)
1998	Kareeb	Chori Chori Jab Nazrein Mili	Hindi	Anu Malik	Rahat Indori	Kumar Sanu
1998	Kareeb	Chura Lo Na Dil Mera Sanam	Hindi	Anu Malik	Rahat Indori	Kumar Sanu
1998	Kareeb	Haan Judayi Se Darta Hain Dil	Hindi	Anu Malik	Rahat Indori	
1998	Kareeb	Chori Chori Kismat Ne Awaaz Di	Hindi	Anu Malik	Rahat Indori	Kumar Sanu
1998	Kareeb	Reet Yahin Jag Ki	Hindi	Anu Malik	Rahat Indori	Jaspinder Narula
1998	Kareeb	Tum Juda Ho Kar Hamen	Hindi	Anu Malik	Rahat Indori	Roop Kumar Rathod
1999	Nepali Babu	Yo Saino Maya	Nepali	Sambhujeet Baskota	Sambhujeet Baskota	Babul Supriyo
1999	Kohram	He Ambe Balihari	Hindi	Dilip Sen-Sameer Sen	Dev Kohli	Sukhwinder Singh
2001	Nayak	Chidiya Too Hotee Toh	Hindi	A. R. Rahman	Anand Bakshi	Abhijeet Bhattacharya
2001	Jaana Nahi Dil Se Door	Din Mein Yeh Kaisa Andhera	Hindi			K. S. Chithra & Kumar Sanu
2001	Manasantha Nuvve	Tooneega Tooneega	Telugu	R. P. Patnaik	Sirivennela Seetharama Sastry	Usha
2002	Kyaa Dil Ne Kahaa	Nikamma Kiya Iss Dil Ne	Hindi	Himesh Reshammiya	Sanjay Chhel	Shaan
2002	Road	Makhmali Yeh Badan	Hindi	Sandesh Shandilya	Khilesh Sharma	Sonu Nigam
2002	Akhiyon Se Goli Maare	Thumka Lagake Naachlo	Hindi	Dilip Sen-Sameer Sen	Nitin Raikwar	Sonu Nigam and Vinod Rathod
2002	Akhiyon Se Goli Maare	Gore Tan Se Sarakta Jaye	Hindi	Anand–Milind	Sameer	Sonu Nigam and Alka Yagnik
2002	Lahana	Dhadkinchhau Mutuma Hola	Nepali	Sachin Singh	Tulsi Ghimire	Udit Narayan
2003	Rules: Pyaar Ka Superhit Formula	Uljhanon Ko De Diya Hai	Hindi	Sandesh Shandilya	Subrat Sinha	KK
2003	Fun2shh	Dhuan Dhuan Sa Sama	Hindi	Pritam	Amitabh Verma, Prayag Raj	K. S. Chithra
2005	Socha Na Tha	O Yaara Rab Rus Jaane De	Hindi	Sandesh Shandilya	Irshad Kamil	Sonu Nigam|-
2005	Muglan	Makhamali Pachheuri	Nepali	Suresh Adhikari	Sundar Shrestha	Udit Narayan
2008	Hum Phir Milein Na Milein	Roz Yeh Mausam Aaye	Hindi	Sandesh Shandilya	Irshad Kamil	Sonu Nigam
2010	Juni Juni - Nepali Album	Purano Hundaina Maya	Nepali			Kumar Sanu
2010	Juni Juni - Nepali Album	Dada Pakha Chaharale	Nepali			
2018	Aaya Hai Dulha Dulhan Le Jayega (AHDDLJ)	Aaya Hai Dulha Dulhan Le Jayega 2009	Hindi	Pradeep	Neeraj Rai	Vinod Rathod
2024	12 Gaun	Yo Manle	Nepali	Arjun Pokharel	Mukta Udas	Shahid Mallya
2025	Music Video	Jai Kailasha	Hindi	Dushyant Pratap Singh	Acharya Hari Das Gupta	Dushyant Pratap Singh

== Awards, honors and nominations ==
=== Awards ===
Year	Award	Won/Nominated
1995	First Position, Zee TV's Sa Re Ga Ma Contest	Won
1999	Best Playback Singer Ashirwad Award for the song Chori Chori	Won
1999	Filmfare Award for Churalo Na Dil Mera Sanam	Nominated
1999	Screen Award for Churalo Na Dil Mera Sanam	Nominated
2018	Best Music Jury Award at the 7th Mumbai Shorts International Film Festival	Won
2019	Best Music Direction Award for the song Jonye Bhalobasar in the movie Bhalobasar Jonye Bhalobasar Songe, at the International Film Festival of MP	Won
2024	Lata Mangeshkar Lata Didi Award	Won
2024	Clef Music Awards for independent music	Won
