= Bunty Walia =

Indian Film Producer

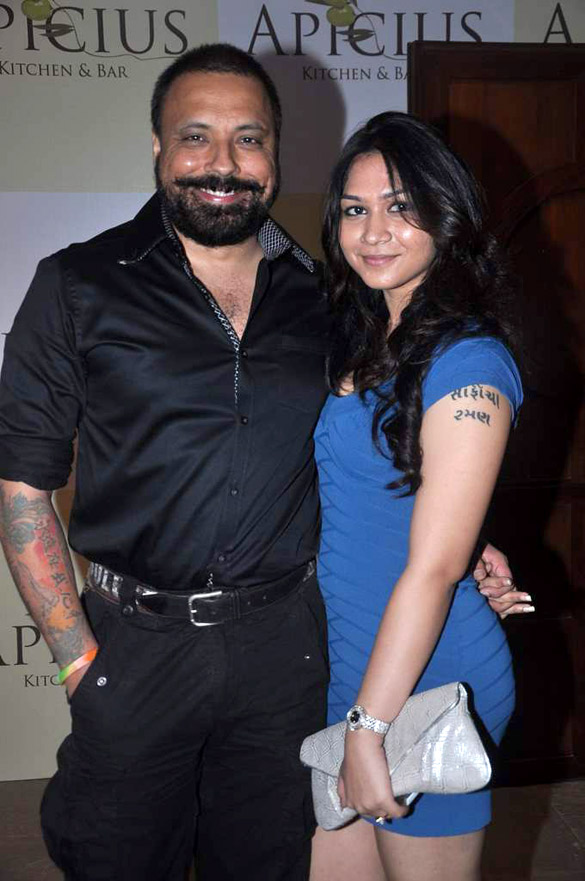
Bunty Walia on the left

Guneet "Bunty" Walia is an Indian film producer and sports entrepreneur. He produced Lamhaa, Hello Brother, Ek Ajnabee and Pyaar Kiya To Darna Kya

He is chief operating officer for the Jaipur Pink Panthers, (a professional kabaddi team). The PKL team is officially managed by Walia's sports management firm, GS Sports. He has been with the team since its inception.

== Filmography ==
Year	Movie	Role
2016	Chowky	as Producer
2010	Lamhaa	as Producer
2005	Ek Ajnabee	as Producer
2002	Maine Dil Tujhko Diya	as Producer
1999	Hello Brother	as Producer
1998	Pyaar Kiya To Darna Kya	as Producer
2012	Bihaad	as Producer
2012	Gangs of London	as Producer

== Personal life ==
Bunty Walia was married to Suman Ranganath in 2006, but they split in May 2007. Later he married Vanessa Parmar born 1982 1st August in Mumbai. The couple share two children. He is brother of Juspreet Singh Walia.

== G.S. Worldwide Entertainment ==
Bunty is the chairman of GS Worldwide Entertainment, an entertainment company that produces movies.

== Philanthropy ==
Bunty has contributed to the Magic Bus charity that aids underprivileged children. He has raised funds for other charities, including self-defense for women. Another portion of the will be to fund the state-of-the-art-gym at Andheri Sports Complex. He has organized charity football match with actors and athletes to raise more funds for the Magic Bus charity.
