= Kapal (film) =

2025 Indian Bengali film

- Theatrical release poster
- Directed by: Suvendu Ghosh
- Written by: Suvendu Ghosh
- Produced by: Arryan Ghosh
- Starring: Raja Sarkar; Sukanya Dutta; Kanchana Moitra
- Cinematography: Arabanda Narayan Dolai
- Edited by: Raj Singh Sidhu
- Music by: Pandit Pinaki Bose; Bob Sn
- Production company: SGF (Suvendu Ghosh Films)
- Distributed by: Piyali Films Kolkata
- Release date: 19 September 2025
- Running time: 110 minutes
- Country: India
- Language: Bengali

Kapal is a 2025 Indian Bengali drama film directed by Suvendu Ghosh. Produced by Ghosh himself under the banner of Suvendu Ghosh Films, the film stars Raja Sarkar, Sukanya Dutta, and Kanchana Moitra in the lead roles. It was released in the theatres on 19 September 2025.

== Synopsis ==
The film tells the story of Kanai Majhi, a poor villager who drives a Toto for a living. His life changes overnight when he wins a big lottery, bringing sudden fame and attention. As opportunists and politicians try to exploit him, Kanai struggles to protect his family and hold on to his simple values amid chaos and greed.

== Cast ==
- Raja Sarkar as Kanai
- Sukanya Dutta as Moyna
- Kanchana Moitra as Swapna Mondal

== Production ==
The film is directed by Suvendu Ghosh and produced by Arryan Ghosh under the banner of SGF (Suvendu Ghosh Films). It is distributed by Piyali Films Kolkata. The screenplay and dialogues were written by Rashi Iqbal, Sayantan Roy, and Suvendu Ghosh.

The music of Kapal is composed by Pandit Pinaki Bose and Bob Sn, with background score by Bob Sn. Lyrics are penned by Bob Sn and Smarajit Bandyopadhyay. The filming took place in Burnpur, West Bengal.

== Reception ==
=== Critical reception ===
Ganesh Aaglave of the Firstpost rated the film 3/5 stars and wrote "Kapal demonstrates the charisma of Suvendu Ghosh’s direction. Every little detail in the frame has been taken care of by him." He praised the performance of the lead trio in the film - particularly Kanchana's acting, applauding her facial expressions and dialogue delivery. Simran Singh of DNA gave the film the same rating and wrote, "Kapal is an engaging watch and does deserve your attention". Praneet Samaiya of Cinetales gave the film the same rating and wrote, "If you want a movie that shows ordinary life turned upside down by luck, Kapal is worth your time. It’s not perfect, but it’s engaging and relatable".
