= Right Yaaa Wrong =

- Theatrical release poster
- Directed by: Neerraj Pathak
- Screenplay by: Neerraj Pathak; Sanjay Chauhan
- Dialogues by: Girish Dhamija; Neerraj Pathak
- Story by: Neerraj Pathak
- Based on: Above Suspicion by Steven Schachter
- Produced by: Subhash Ghai; Krishan Choudhary; Neerraj Pathak; Puneet Agarwal
- Starring: Sunny Deol; Irrfan Khan; Konkona Sen Sharma; Isha Koppikar; Arav Chowdhary
- Cinematography: Ravi Walia
- Edited by: Ashfaque Makrani
- Music by: Monty Sharma
- Production company: Mukta Arts
- Distributed by: Mukta Arts
- Release date: 12 March 2010
- Running time: 125 minutes
- Country: India
- Language: Hindi

Right Yaaa Wrong (transl. Right or wrong?) is a 2010 Indian Hindi-language crime thriller film directed by Neeraj Pathak. The film stars Sunny Deol, Irrfan Khan, Konkona Sen Sharma, Isha Koppikar, and Arav Chowdhary. It is based on the 1995 American film Above Suspicion.

The film was released on 12 March 2010. ASTPL, an Indian software developer, also released a mobile video game based on the film.

== Plot ==
Right Yaaa Wrong follows the story of Ajay Shridhar, who is accused of two murders. The tale tests the complex relationship between two police officers and the moral dilemmas they face. ACP Ajay Shridhar and Inspector Vinay Patnaik are both cops and closest friends. Ajay is more compassionate, and sometimes takes risk and bends the rules for justice. On the other hand, Vinay is a strict and by-the-book officer. Ajay is married to Anshita and they have a school-going son, Yash.

The plot takes a dramatic turn when Ajay is paralyzed in the line of duty, after which he uses a wheelchair. He also discovers that Anshita is not taking a good care of their son. He becomes dejected and feels helpless. However, things get even more complicated when he discovers Anshita is having an illicit affair with Ajay's step-brother, Sanjay Shridhar.

Feeling betrayed and emotionally destroyed, Ajay hatches a meticulous and chilling plan for revenge on his wife. He takes out a large life insurance policy and, pretending to be suicidal and desperate, tells Anshita and Sanjay that he does not want to spend his life in a wheelchair and asks them to murder him. He tells Anshita to collect the insurance money after his death and live a better life afterwards. The pair agree to kill Ajay and make it look like a botched home robbery. On the night it is set to happen, they sneak out of a movie theatre after causing a commotion in order to create their alibi, go to the house, and start staging the scene. They take out two pistols with silencers. First Sanjay shoots two bullets into Ajay, apparently killing him. Unknown to Anshita and Sanjay, Ajay had loaded fake bullets in their guns. He prepends to be dead, prompting Anshita and Sanjay to celebrate his death. Then, Ajay reveals that he is alive and shoots Sanjay dead. He reveals his deception to Anshita and gets up from his wheelchair, surprising her and revealing that his paralysis was a ruse. He informs Anshita that he knew about her affair. Anshita pulls the trigger to kill Ajay but nothing happens as the bullets are fake. Then, Ajay shoots and kills her.

Police find dead bodies of Anshita and Sanjay in Ajay's house. Ajay, who is still in his wheelchair, claims that he killed them in self-defense after they tried to kill him for the insurance money. Given his physical condition and the staged evidence, the police force believes his story. The only person who doesn't buy the story is his friend, Inspector Vinay. Vinay is convinced that Ajay orchestrated the entire thing and that the deaths were not in self-defense, but were premeditated murders. This begins the test of the complex relationship between two police officers and the moral dilemmas they both are facing. The pursuit becomes a high-stakes, mind-game driven cat-and-mouse chase.

Due to Vinay's efforts, Ajay becomes the prime suspect in the murder case. The investigation is handed to his friend and rival, Vinay. The story then becomes an intense battle of wits and mind games between the two friends, with Vinay trying to prove Ajay's guilt and Ajay trying to clear his name. Ajay's only support comes from Radhika, who is Vinay's younger sister and a lawyer who takes on Ajay's case. She begins to fall in love with him, adding another layer of complexity to the narrative.

In the final court hearing, Vinay approaches Ajay in the courtroom and tells him that he knows that he is a murderer and knows that he can walk. Vinay then stabs Ajay in the right thigh, expecting to elicit a physical reaction to prove that he actually can use his legs. Ajay does not even wince and acts as if he did not feel the stabbing. Ajay is finally acquitted by the court.

Ajay begins dating Radhika. Later, it is shown that Ajay and Radhika are married and have settled down blissfully with Yash.

The plot explores themes of friendship, love, betrayal, and the fine line between what is legally right and what is morally wrong. In essence, Ajay is a protagonist who is also the perpetrator. The story forces the audience to grapple with the moral ambiguity of his actions, questioning whether his betrayal-fueled revenge is justifiable. The title itself, "Right Yaaa Wrong", directly reflects Ajay's moral dilemma.

== Cast ==
- Sunny Deol as ACP Ajay Shridhar
- Irrfan Khan as Inspector Vinay Patnaik
- Konkona Sen Sharma as Advocate Radhika Patnaik
- Isha Koppikar as Anshita 'Anshu' Sridhar
- Arav Chowdhary as Sanjay Sridhar
- Ali Haji as Yash Sridhar
- Aryan Vaid as Boris
- Deepal Shaw as Inspector Shalini Chawla
- Govind Namdeo as a Public Prosecutor Nigam
- Suhasini Mulay as a Judge
- Kamlesh Sawant as Sawant
- Ali Khan as Mr. Dacosta
- Parikshat Sahni as a Doctor
- Juliet Glazkova
- Nilaanjana Bhattacharya as Ajay's sister
- Surendra Rajan as a Security Guard
- Shillpi Sharma
- Vijay Patkar as Police Inspector
- Satish Kashyap as Police Inspector

== Music ==
The film's music was composed by Monty Sharma with lyrics penned by Sameer.

Right Yaa Wrong

Soundtrack album by Monty Sharma
- Released: 12 March 2010
- Genre: Feature film soundtrack
- Language: Hindi
- Label: Tips Music

All tracks are written by Sameer.

No.	Title	Singer(s)	Length
1.	"Right Yaa Wrong"	Ujjaini Mukherjee	4:18
2.	"Tiledar Dupatta"	Mika Singh	2:47
3.	"Meri Aashaon Ki Bhor"	Amitraj	2:09
4.	"Rihaee"	Kunal Ganjawala	4:19
5.	"Lakhnavi Kabab"	Master Saleem	3:22
6.	"Right Yaa Wrong" (Male)	Kunal Ganjawala	4:18

== Reception ==
The Times of India gave 3.5/5 stars, writing "Wrong marketing for a right film, Right Yaaa Wrong is the surprise package this week. Go, get your thrills". Mayank Shekhar of Hindustan Times gave 2/5 stars writing "‘The Subhash the Ghai’ – self-styled showman of ‘80s Bollywood – could intrigue you as a person of motion pictures. A popular director once, a prolific producer still, Ghai also runs a popular film-training institute (Whistling Woods) out of Mumbai".
