= I Am Unused =

Web series

- Promotional poster
- Genre: Drama; Mystery; Romance; Crime
- Screenplay by: Ramit Thakur
- Story by: Ramit Thakur
- Directed by: Dushyant Pratap Singh
- Starring: Mushtaq Khan; Rajkumar Kanojia; Aasma Sayed
- Music by: Piyush Ranjan
- Country of origin: India
- Original language: Hindi
- No. of seasons: 1
- No. of episodes: 6

Production
- Producers: Anuj Gupta; Ved Prakash
- Production location: India
- Cinematography: Yogesh Singh
- Editor: Priya Gupta
- Camera setup: Multi-camera

Original release
- Network: MX Player
- Release: 4 April – 4 April 2023

I Am Unused (Hindi: मैं अप्रयुक्त हूँ) is an Indian, Hindi-Language Web Series directed by Dushyant Pratap Singh for MX Player. The series stars Mushtaq Khan and Rajkumar Kanojia in key roles alongside Aasma Sayed.

== Synopsis ==
Maya, a young woman betrayed by her friend Rohan, discovers she has HIV. Determined to seek revenge, Maya plots against Rohan and others who wronged her. Through her journey, she learns about resilience, forgiveness, and empowerment, inspiring others with her unwavering strength.

== Cast ==
- Mushtaq Khan
- Rajkumar Kanojia
- Aasma Sayed
- Deepika Charak
- Abhinay Soni

== Production ==
The web-series was mostly shot in Uttar Pradesh and Mumbai, Maharashtra, India.

== Overview ==
Series overview
Series	Episodes	Originally released	
Series	Episodes	First released	Last released
Chapter 1	4	4 April 2023	4 April 2023
