= Lamhaa =

- Theatrical release poster
- Directed by: Rahul Dholakia
- Screenplay by: Rahul Dholakia
- Produced by: Bunty Walia; Juspreet Singh Walia
- Starring: Sanjay Dutt; Bipasha Basu; Kunal Kapoor; Anupam Kher
- Cinematography: James Fowlds
- Edited by: Ashmith Kunder; Akshay Mohan
- Music by: Songs: Mithoon; Score: Sanjoy Chowdhury
- Production company: G. S. Entertainment
- Distributed by: PVR Pictures
- Release date: 16 July 2010
- Running time: 135 minutes
- Country: India
- Language: Hindi

Lamhaa: The Untold Story of Kashmir (transl. Moment: The Untold Story of Kashmir), shortly called Lamhaa, is a 2010 Indian Hindi-language action thriller film written and directed by Rahul Dholakia. It stars Sanjay Dutt, Bipasha Basu, Kunal Kapoor, and Anupam Kher. The film follows an Indian Army officer who goes undercover to identify the individual responsible for a series of extremist attacks in Kashmir, where he receives assistance from the daughter of a separatist leader.

== Plot ==
An Indian Intelligence officer, Vikram Sabharwal, is sent undercover to Kashmir posing as a journalist to investigate those responsible for a wave of extremist violence. Assisted by a local tailor with ties to both militants and security forces, he navigates the region's volatile political landscape, where his encounters with the daughter of a separatist leader, her mentor, and an emerging politician gradually reveal the identities of those orchestrating the attacks.

== Cast ==
- Sanjay Dutt as Vikram Sabharwal / Gul Jahangir
- Bipasha Basu as Aziza Abbas Ansari
- Kunal Kapoor as Aatif Hussain
- Anupam Kher as Haji Sayyed Shah
- Shernaz Patel as Parveena
- Mahesh Manjrekar as Peer Baba
- Murali Sharma as Dhruv Raina
- Yashpal Sharma as Mohammed Hussain Rauf
- Yuri Suri as Pasha
- Vipin Sharma as Colonel Kapoor
- Asif Basra Char Chinar
- Rajesh Khera as Parvez
- Jyoti Dogra as Badi Bi
- Denzil Smith as Brigadier Sharma
- Ehsaan Khan as SP Khan
- Vishwajeet Pradhan as Daljeet
- Vineet Sharma as Major Deepak Rampal

== Reception ==
Sukanya Verma of Rediff gave 3/5 stars writing, "Ultimately, Lamhaa's relevance lies in its ability to give you an overview, even if it's a crammed one, about the ugliness of greed and intolerance through the example of Kashmir". Nikhat Kazmi of Times of India gave 3.5/5 stars writing, "Lamhaa is a no-holds-barred look at the multi-layered turmoil in Kashmir, with so many real-life references that you end up with just one conclusion: now here's a real film about a real problem".

Mayank Shekhar of the Hindustan Times gave 2/5 stars and wrote, "It's not easy to make sense of Kashmir. It's harder still then to make sense of this film".

== Soundtrack ==
The soundtrack was composed by Mithoon with lyrics written by Sayeed Quadri and Amitabh Varma.

=== Track listing ===
No.	Title	Lyrics	Singer(s)	Length
1.	"Madno"	Sayeed Qadri	Kshitij Tarey, Chinmayi	8:26
2.	"Main Kaun Hoon"	Amitabh Verma	Palash Sen	7:12
3.	"Rehmat Zara"	Sayeed Qadri	Mithoon, Mohammad Irfan Ali	5:24
4.	"Sajnaa"	Sayeed Qadri	Mika Singh, Chinmayi	8:26
5.	"Salaam Zindagi"	Sayeed Qadri	Mohammad Irfan Ali, Arun Daga, Saleem	6:56
6.	"Zameen O Aasmaa"	Sayeed Qadri	Kshitij Tarey	5:53

== Controversy ==
Lamhaa was banned in Pakistan and several Gulf Cooperation Council (GCC) countries, including Saudi Arabia, Bahrain, Kuwait, Qatar, the United Arab Emirates, and Oman. The UAE's National Media Council Censorship Board stated that the film's content was considered highly objectionable and controversial.

The film's scheduled screening in Kashmir was also cancelled due to the prevailing security situation in the region. Producer Bunty Walia stated that the decision was not based on requests for edits, but on a refusal to screen the film. He expressed disappointment over the ban, citing the Middle East as an important market for Hindi films and noting the potential financial impact, while also regretting that audiences there would be unable to watch the film.

In India, the Central Board of Film Certification (CBFC) granted the film an A (Adults Only) certificate after requiring two edits.

== Accolades ==
Award Ceremony	Category	Recipient	Result	Ref.(s)
3rd Mirchi Music Awards	Upcoming Male Vocalist of The Year	Mohammed Irfan - "Salaam Zindagi"	Nominated	
3rd Mirchi Music Awards	Song representing Sufi tradition	"Rehmat Zara"	Nominated	
