= Jal (film) =

2013 Hindi-language film

- Official Movie Poster
- Directed by: Girish Malik
- Screenplay by: Girish Malik; Rakesh Mishra
- Story by: Rakesh Mishra
- Produced by: Oneworld Films Pvt. Ltd.
- Starring: Purab Kohli; Tannishtha Chatterjee; Kirti Kulhari; Yashpal Sharma; Mukul Dev; Saidah Jules; Rasika Dugal
- Cinematography: Sunita Radia
- Music by: Sonu Nigam; Bickram Ghosh; Lyrics; Sanjeev Tiwari; Sonu Nigam
- Production company: Intermezzo Studio Alien Sense Films Pvt Ltd
- Distributed by: DAR Motion Pictures
- Release dates: 6 October 2013 (BIFF); 4 April 2014 (India)
- Country: India
- Language: Hindi

Jal (transl. Water) is a 2013 Indian Hindi-language drama film set in the Rann of Kutch, India, and follows an overconfident water diviner Bakka who tries to solve the drought problems in his village, but faces unforeseen circumstances when he tries to help a female bird watcher save flamingos. The film is directed by Girish Malik and is his debut film as a director.

The film premiered and received special mention at the "New Currents" section of the Busan International Film Festival 2013 and in the "Indian Panorama" section of the International Film Festival of India.

The film was theatrically released in India on 4 April 2014. One World Films collaborated with DAR Motion Pictures for the distribution of Jal in India. The film won the National Film Award for Best Special Effects for the year 2013 at the 61st National Film Awards. Jal was also short-listed as India's official entry to the 2014 Academy Awards in the Best Picture Category and the Best Original Score Category. The film advanced in the top 114 films in the Best Original Score Category.

== Synopsis ==
The story of Jal centers on Bakka (Purab Kohli), a young man who possesses a unique ability to locate water in the desert. With the backdrop of water scarcity, the film tells a complex story of love, relationships, enmity, deceit, and circumstances that bring about the dark side of human character.

== Cast ==
- Purab Kohli as Bakka
- Tannishtha Chatterjee as Kajri
- Kirti Kulhari as Kesar
- Yashpal Sharma as Ramkhiladi
- Mukul Dev as Punya
- Saidah Jules as Kim
- Ravi Gossain as Rakla
- Rahul Singh
- Gary Richardson
- Rohit Pathak
- Bharat Hathi

== Music ==
The music of the film is composed by Sonu Nigam and ace tabla player/percussionist Bickram Ghosh. This is their first composing collaboration for a Bollywood film.

The composer duo recorded the film's title song with Shubha Mudgal. The title song used ragas like Marwa and Puriya combined with rare musical instruments like the Armenian Duduk. The entire song was created in a day.

Jal's background score is by Sonu Nigam and Bickram Ghosh. They used a mix of Indian and International sounds with a lot of percussion. Sonu Nigam and Bickram Ghosh were nominated in Oscars 2014 long list among top 114 in the Best Original Score Category.

== Soundtrack ==
Jal

Soundtrack album by Sonu Nigam – Bickram Ghosh
- Released: 19 March 2014 (India)
- Genre: Feature Film Soundtrack
- Labels: Saga Music & Unisys Info Solutions
- Producer: Sonu Nigam – Bickram Ghosh

Sonu Nigam – Bickram Ghosh chronology
Sooper Se Ooper (2013)	Jal (2014)	Chowky (2015)

Track #	title	Singer(s)	Lyrics	Composer(s)
1	Jal De (Title Song)	Shubha Mudgal	Sonu Nigam – Sanjeev Tiwari	Sonu Nigam; Bickram Ghosh
2	You Fill My Life	Ustad Ghulam Mustafa Khan, Suzanne	Sonu Nigam – Bickram Ghosh	Sonu Nigam; Bickram Ghosh
3	Zaalima	Sonu Nigam	Sonu Nigam	Sonu Nigam; Bickram Ghosh
4	Paani Si Behti Jaye	Ambarish Das	Sanjeev Tiwari	Sonu Nigam; Bickram Ghosh
5	Bakka Pani De	Instrumental	Instrumental	Sonu Nigam; Bickram Ghosh
6	The Mirage and the Tornado	Instrumental	Instrumental	Sonu Nigam; Bickram Ghosh
7	The Sweet Dream of Water	Instrumental	Instrumental	Sonu Nigam; Bickram Ghosh
8	Mesmerized By Rann	Instrumental	Instrumental	Sonu Nigam; Bickram Ghosh
9	The Tragedy of Rann	Instrumental	Instrumental	Sonu Nigam; Bickram Ghosh
10	The Barren Land	Instrumental	Instrumental	Sonu Nigam; Bickram Ghosh
11	The Cry of the Soul	Instrumental	Instrumental	Sonu Nigam; Bickram Ghosh
12	Dried Up Tears	Instrumental	Instrumental	Sonu Nigam; Bickram Ghosh
13	Nature and the Machine	Instrumental	Instrumental	Sonu Nigam; Bickram Ghosh
14	Ankhiyan – Anthem	Instrumental	Instrumental	Sonu Nigam; Bickram Ghosh
15	The Water Ritual 1	Instrumental	Instrumental	Sonu Nigam; Bickram Ghosh
16	The Water Ritual 2	Instrumental	Instrumental	Sonu Nigam; Bickram Ghosh
17	The Hope of Water	Instrumental	Instrumental	Sonu Nigam; Bickram Ghosh
18	The Flow of Water	Instrumental	Instrumental	Sonu Nigam; Bickram Ghosh
19	The Sorrow Within	Instrumental	Instrumental	Sonu Nigam; Bickram Ghosh
20	Bakka And Kesar Tryst With Water	Instrumental	Instrumental	Sonu Nigam; Bickram Ghosh
21	Chase	Instrumental	Instrumental	Sonu Nigam; Bickram Ghosh
22	Anger	Instrumental	Instrumental	Sonu Nigam; Bickram Ghosh

== Critical reception ==
Times of India gave the film 3.5 stars and stated "Jal captures the bare beauty of the golden cracked earth and its tortuous tapestry in artfully mounted frames. It's a picture-perfect album with stark sights and parched souls". Taran Adarsh from BollywoodHungama has rated 3.5/5 stars and stated "JAL makes a rock-solid impact. It's poignant and powerful and I suggest, you take time out to watch this truly gripping fare" FilmFare gave the film 4/5 stars and appreciated the film "Great visuals and premise desiccated by a pedantic pace".
