= Sanjeev Tiwari =

Indian lyricist

Sanjeev Tiwari

Sanjeev Tiwari is an Indian singer, lyricist, story, screenplay, and dialogue writer of Bollywood. Sanjeev Tiwari was a renowned radio personality from Kolkata and received the best male RJ award in 2007. he was in Radio for about 15 years right from the beginning of FM Radio in India. He last worked as the national music manager with MY Fm. Conducted many radio workshops. He has also lend his voice for many songs, commercials & dubbed for many projects. He has recently launched his own music channel called ‘Sunozara Music' He is producing music videos from his music publication.

== Career ==
He has written story, screenplays and dialogues for television shows like Savdhaan India for Life Ok, and Gumrah: End of Innocence for Channel V. He wrote the title track for life Ok's serial Meri Maa, Zee TV's serial "Bhutu" dialogues for the film Bloody Isshq, and lyrics for the films Sooper Se Ooper, Morning Walk, Jal, Via Darjeeling, Yatra, Devaki, Chowky and Hothat Brishti. He has written and composed songs for Bollywood films including Hotel Beautifool.

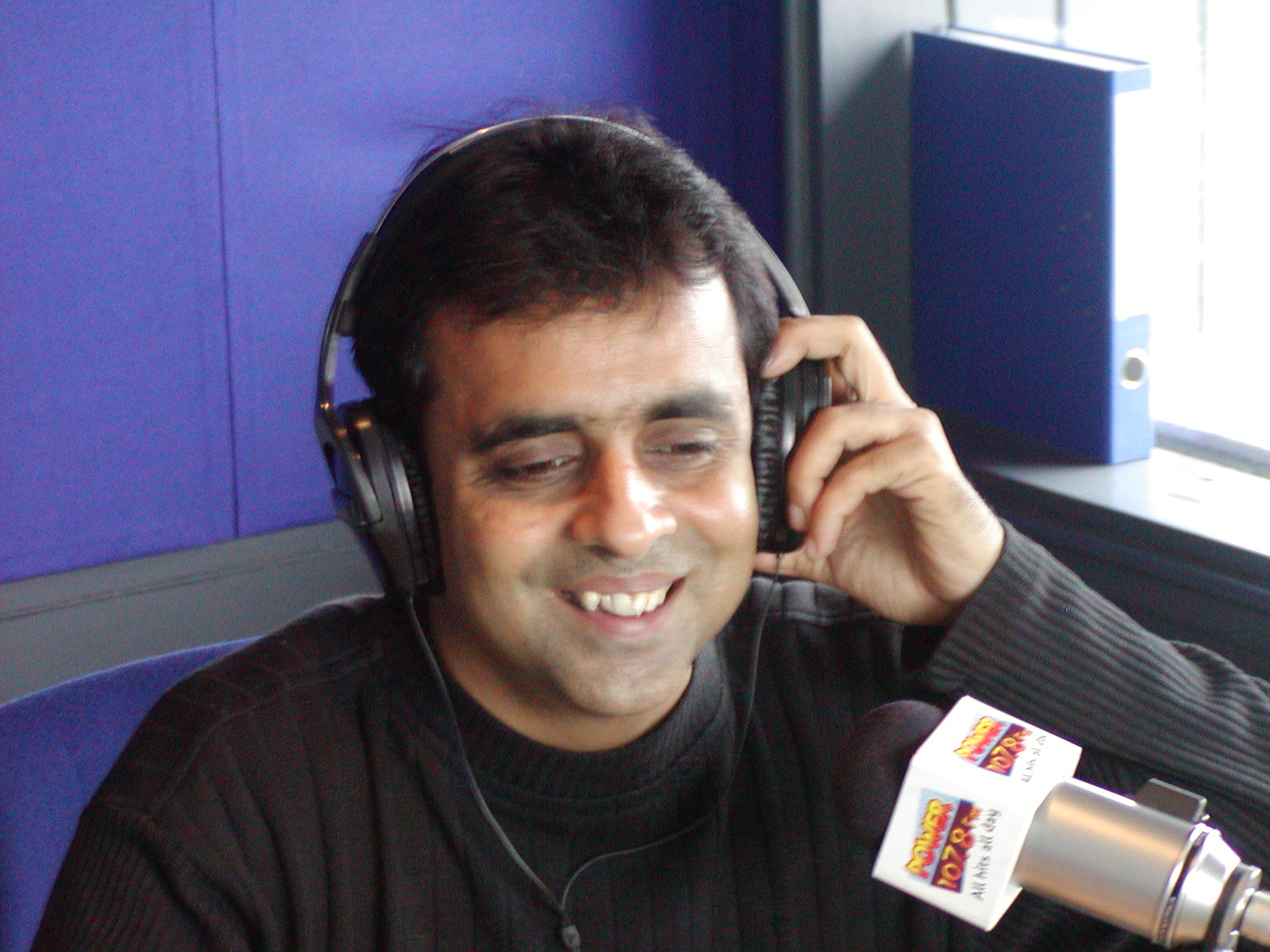
Photograph of Rj Sanjeev Tiwar in a studio.

Sanjeev wrote the dialogues & lyrics for television serial Jai Kanhaiya Lal Ki on Star Bharat. His songs (Bholey Baba) and (Shundori komola) are chart busters in his first venture into the Tollywood film industry as a lyricist for the movie "Villain (2018 film)" featuring Ankush Hazra, Mimi Chakraborty and Rittika Sen, the movie has been directed by Baba Yadav and both the songs have been composed by Subhadeep Mitra under the banner of "Shree Venkatesh Films". His latest is song 'Naina' from the album Ishq composed by Bickram Ghosh & sung by Hariharan. On 18 February 2022 a film was released called Before You Die Sanjeev has written the Screenplay & Dialogue. Currently Sanjeev has just finised writing the dialogues & lyrics for two television serials Advocate Anjali AwasthiStar Plus Disney+ Hotstar & Mr & Mr. and Mrs. Parshuram produced by Blues Productions. He is also producing audio & video albums, distributing them worldwide for his Record Label called Sunozara Music. his recent music singlr 'Ami Abhaya' based on Kolkata's Abhaya is appricaited by everyone. He is also started his first ever video podcast on his Sunozara Music Channel.

== Filmography ==
Denotes films that have not yet been released

Year	Films	Dialogues/Songs	Music director	Language	Singer
1998	Amiee Pari	Main Mulazim Hoon Sarkari	Nachiketa Chakraborty	Bangali	Nachiketa Chakraborty
1999	Deewana Dil Hai	All Songs	Sanjeev Tiwari	Hindi	Sanjeev Tiwari
1998	Hothat Brishti	Ruk Ja Yun Chhod Ke Na Ja	Nachiketa Chakraborty	Bengali	Kavitha Krishnamurthy
2002	Rishta	All Songs	Madhu Mukherjee, Indradip Dasgupta	Hindi	Raghab Chatterjee
2004	Samaa	Kal Saari Ratiya, Sajna, Geela Sa	Bickram Ghosh	Hindi	Shankar Mahadevan, Shaan, Jojo
2005	Gaon	All Songs	Sanjeev Tiwari	Bhojpuri	Sanjeev Tiwari
2006	Devaki	Dhuan Dhuan & Tohre Bahiyan Mein	Bickram Ghosh	Hindi	Jojo
2007	Yatra	Panchhi Pijare Se Ud Jayega	Goutam Ghose	Hindi	Keya Acharya
2007	Beyond RhythmScape	Sawariya, Tore Sang	Bickram Ghosh	Hindi	Kailash Kher, Shubha Mudgal
2008	Via Darjeeling	Sirf Ehsaas	Prabudhha Benerjee	Hindi	Kunal Ganjawala
2009	Morning Walk	Bhoy Bhayo, Manwa, Nach Le	Jeet Gannguli	Hindi	Ustad Rashid Khan, Shreya Ghoshal, Shaan
2011	Sawariya	All Songs except Sukoon	Hidayat Hussain	Hindi	Hidayat Hussain
2013	Bloody Isshq	dialogues		Hindi	
2013	Like It Happened Yesterday	Mano Kal Hi Ki Baat Hai	Sidharttha Suhas	Hindi Album	Shaan
2013	Sooper Se Ooper	All songs except Introducing Gul, Sapna Mera	Sonu Nigam, Bickram Ghosh	Hindi	Mika Singh, Sowmya Raoh, Ash King, Teesha Nigam, Ambarish Das, Parvati Kumari, Anish Oushnik Majumdar, Nevaan Nigam, Saloni, Rohini
2014	Jal	Jal De (Title Song) with Sonu Nigam, Paani Si Behti Jaye	Sonu Nigam, Bickram Ghosh	Hindi	Shubha Mudgal Ambarish Das
2014	Fm Bindaas	All Songs	Sanjeev Tiwari	Bhojpuri	Sanjeev Tiwari
2016	Chowky	Zindagi Adhjali, Chhoo Le	Bapi Tutul	Hindi	Shashanka Ghosh
2017	Hotel Beautifool	All songs	Sanjeev Tiwari (Sameer Iqbal Patel)	Hindi	Shaan, Usha Uthup, Bhoomi Trivedi
2017	Maa Ashchhe	Maa Ashchhe	Sanjeev Tiwari	Bengali	Sanjeev Tiwari
2018	Villain	Bholey Baba, Shundori Komola	Subhadeep Mitra (JAM8)	Bengali	Badshah, Nikhita Gandhi, Armaan Malik, Antara Mitra
2019	Jhol	Dur	Bapi Tutul	Hindi	Bapi
2019	Happy Wala Pujo Re	Happy Wala Pujo Re	Sanjeev Tiwari	Bengali	Sanjeev Tiwari
2020	Bolo Chhathi Maiya Ki Jay	Bolo Chhathi Maiya Ki Jay	Sanjeev Tiwari	Bhojpuri	Sanjeev Tiwari
2021	Naina	Ishq	Bickram Ghosh	Hindi	Hariharan
2022	Before You Die	Screenplay & dialogues		Hindi	

== Television ==
Denotes films that have not yet been released

Year	Serials	Writer, Lyrics	Channel
2011	Meri Maa	title track	Life OK
2012–2016	Gumrah: End of Innocence	story, screenplays and dialogues	Channel V India
2012–2017	Savdhaan India	story, screenplays and dialogues	Life OK, from 2017 Star Bharat
2017	Bhutu	title track O Meri Maa	Zee TV
2018	Jai Kanhaiya Lal Ki	dialogues & lyrics	Star Bharat
2024	Advocate Anjali Awasthi	dialogues & lyrics	Star Plus Disney+ Hotstar
2026	Mr & Mrs Parashuram	dialogues & lyrics	Star Plus Disney+ Hotstar

== See also ==
- List of programmes broadcast by StarPlus
