= The Hundred Bucks =

- Directed by: Dushyant Pratap Singh
- Written by: Vishnupriya Singh
- Screenplay by: M Salim
- Based on: A book
- Starring: Kavita Tripathi; Dinesh Bawra
- Release date: 21 February 2020
- Country: India
- Language: Hindi

The Hundred Bucks (Hindi:द हंड्रेड बक्स) is a 2020 Indian film directed by Dushyant Pratap Singh. The film stars Kavita Tripathi and Dinesh Bawra in lead. The film is distributed by Manoj Nandwana. The film is written by Vishnupriya Singh.

The screenplay of the above movie is written by M. Salim, an Indian writer known for penning down the screenplay of Dongri Ka Raja. Directed by Hadi Ali Abrar, the movie stars Ronit Roy, Gashmeer Mahajani, and Reecha Sinha in lead roles.

== Plot ==
The hundred Bucks tells the story of one night of a call girl. How she finds her customers and how she got cheated.

== Cast ==
- Alya bhati
- Danish taimoor
- Javed Shaikh
- Amar Mehta
