= Hello Brother (1999 film) =

1999 film by Sohail Khan

- Theatrical release poster
- Directed by: Sohail Khan
- Written by: Sohail Khan
- Based on: Aayushkalam by Kamal
- Produced by: Sohail Khan; Bunty Walia
- Starring: Salman Khan; Arbaaz Khan; Rani Mukerji; Shakti Kapoor
- Narrated by: Amitabh Bachchan
- Cinematography: Santosh Thundiyil
- Edited by: Yusuf Khan
- Music by: Sajid–Wajid; Himesh Reshammiya
- Production companies: Sohail Khan Productions; G.S. Entertainment
- Distributed by: Tips Industries
- Release date: 10 September 1999 (India)
- Running time: 132 minutes
- Country: India
- Language: Hindi
- Budget: ₹9 crore
- Box office: ₹21.10 crore

Hello Brother is a 1999 Indian Hindi-language supernatural action romantic comedy film written and directed by Sohail Khan. It stars Khan's real-life elder brothers Salman Khan and Arbaaz Khan with Rani Mukerji and Shakti Kapoor. The film is an adaptation of 1992 Malayalam film Aayushkalam (itself adapted from the 1990 American films Ghost and Heart Condition).

== Plot ==
Hero (Salman Khan) works for a courier company owned by Khanna (Shakti Kapoor). He is spirited and humorous and is in love with Rani (Rani Mukerji) but she simply thinks of Hero as a very good friend. Inspector Vishal (Arbaaz Khan) works in the narcotics department. Vishal, who is stationed at a different Police Department, transfers to Mumbai from Goa where he is greeted Sr.Inspector(Padoda(e))(Neeraj Vohra).Vishal suspects Khanna to be involved in a drug ring and confronts him. Hero stands up to Vishal and defends his boss, but soon learns the truth behind Khanna. In a confrontation, Hero is shot dead by Khanna and shoots Vishal in the heart. The police department decides to transplant Hero's heart into Vishal's body.

Hero appears as a ghost now and can only be seen by Vishal, since his heart is in Vishal's body. Hero says that he will only rest in peace after Khanna is killed, thus avenging him. Vishal decides to go about doing this, and Rani and Vishal begin to fall in love with each other. Hero dislikes this and tries to foil Vishal's plans of getting close to Rani. But Hero and Vishal start getting closer and work together, becoming good friends after Vishal confronts Khanna's drug company.

Khanna arranges to leave the country but kidnaps Rani. Vishal and Hero go to save Rani and fight off Khanna's henchmen, but Vishal gets injured. Enraged, Hero then goes inside him and controls his fighting moves, helping him to beat the thugs. Rani witnesses this and realizes that only Hero could perform such moves. She calls out Hero's name, though Vishal does not know that Hero is inside him. Khanna shoots Vishal. Hero takes Vishal's hand and shoots Khanna with the gun.

Khanna finally dies, and as Rani is comforting Vishal, he tells her that Hero is with them and he loves Rani. Rani then tells Vishal to tell Hero that she loves Him. Khanna's ghost rises from his dead body and Hero hits him. Khanna is taken to Hell and Hero is taken to Heaven.

Afterward, Rani and Vishal have gotten married and are spending their wedding night and honeymoon in a house on the water. It is shown that Hero, now a Fairy, is happily watching over them from Heaven. They then lived happily ever after .

== Cast ==
- Salman Khan as Hero/Angel/Fairy
- Arbaaz Khan as Inspector Vishal
- Rani Mukerji as Rani
- Shakti Kapoor as Khanna
- Johnny Lever as Havaldar Hatela
- Razak Khan as Ninja Chacha
- Neeraj Vora as Sr. Inspector
- Sulbha Arya as Rani's Mother
- Dinyar Tirandaz as Doctor
- Amitabh Bachchan as God voiceover only (cameo appearance)
- Ganesh Acharya as himself in the song "Chaandi ki Daal Par" (cameo appearance)

== Music ==
Hello Brother

Soundtrack album by Himesh Reshammiya Sajid–Wajid
- Released: 4 July 1999 (India)
- Recorded: 1999
- Venue: Mumbai
- Genre: Feature film soundtrack
- Length: 49:56
- Producer: Himesh Reshammiya

Himesh Reshammiya Sajid–Wajid chronology
| Bandhan (1998) | Hello Brother (1999) | Dulhan Hum Le Jayenge (2000) |

The soundtrack was very popular especially track "Teri Chunnariya" sung by Kumar Sanu & Alka Yagnik. According to the Indian trade website Box Office India, with around 22,00,000 units sold the soundtrack became the eighth highest-selling album of the year.

| # | Song | Singer(s) | Length | Composer |
|---|---|---|---|---|
| 1. | "Teri Chunnariya" | Kumar Sanu, Alka Yagnik | 05:48 | Himesh Reshammiya |
| 2. | "Chupke Se Koi" | Udit Narayan, Alka Yagnik | 05:39 | Sajid-Wajid |
| 3. | "Hata Saawan Ki Ghata" | Babul Supriyo, Jaspinder Narula | 04:21 | Sajid-Wajid |
| 4. | "Area Ka Hero" | Sonu Nigam, Hema Sardesai | 04:18 | Sajid–Wajid |
| 5. | "Hello Brother" | S.P. Balasubrahmanyam, Kamaal Khan (singer), Rekha Bhardwaj | 05:15 | Sajid-Wajid |
| 6. | "Chandi Ki Daal Par" | Salman Khan, Alka Yagnik | 05:57 | Himesh Reshammiya |
| 7. | "Teri Chunnariya" (Remix) | Kumar Sanu, Alka Yagnik | 04:52 | Himesh Reshammiya |
| 8. | "Chupke Se Koi" (Remix) | Udit Narayan, Alka Yagnik | 04:21 | Sajid-Wajid |
| 9. | "Hata Sawaan Ki Ghata" (Remix) | Babul Supriyo, Jaspinder Narula | 03:59 | Sajid-Wajid |
| 10. | "Hello Brother" (Remix) | Jaspinder Narula, Sonu Nigam, Kamaal Khan | 04:58 | Sajid-Wajid |

== Release and reception ==
Suparn Verma of Rediff.com wrote that "Hello Brother is a loud, garish film; it is funny, if you have an appetite for such fare".

The film was dubbed and released in Telugu under the same name later that year, despite a 1994 Telugu film with the same name was already released.
