= Saidah Jules =

Indian film actress

- Born: Juliet Glazkova; Kaliningrad, Russia
- Occupation: Actress
- Years active: 2010-present

Juliet Glazkova, known by her stage name Saidah Jules, is a Russian actress. She is known for her roles in the Bollywood films Pyaar Impossible!, Jal and Right Yaaa Wrong.

== Personal life ==
Jules is from Kaliningrad and grew up in Germany.

== Filmography ==
Year	Film	Role
2010	Pyaar Impossible!	Actress
2013	Jal	Kim
2010	Right Yaaa Wrong	Actress
2016	The Dead End	Maya
2016	Fun Freaked Face Booked	Actress
2019	On The Ramp	Actress
