= Pyaar Kiya To Darna Kya (1998 film) =

- Poster
- Directed by: Sohail Khan
- Screenplay by: Sanjeev Duggal (dialogues)
- Story by: Sohail Khan
- Produced by: Bunty Walia; Sohail Khan; Vashu Bhagnani
- Starring: Dharmendra; Salman Khan; Kajol; Arbaaz Khan
- Cinematography: Rasool Ellore
- Edited by: Yusuf Khan
- Music by: Jatin–Lalit; Himesh Reshammiya; Sajid–Wajid
- Production companies: G.S Entertainment; Pooja Entertainment
- Distributed by: T-Series Films; Eros Media
- Release date: 27 March 1998
- Running time: 158 minutes
- Country: India
- Language: Hindi
- Budget: ₹7.75 crore
- Box office: ₹33.36 crore

Pyaar Kiya To Darna Kya (transl. Why be afraid if you love someone?) is a 1998 Indian Hindi-language romantic comedy film written and directed by Sohail Khan. It stars Dharmendra, Salman Khan, Kajol and Arbaaz Khan.

At the 44th Filmfare Awards, Pyaar Kiya To Darna Kya received seven nominations, including Best Film, Best Director (Sohail), Best Actor (Salman) and Best Supporting Actor (Arbaaz), and won R. D. Burman Award for New Music Talent (Kamaal Khan for "O O Jaane Jaana").

== Plot ==
Muskaan is an orphan girl living on a farm run by her overly-protective elder brother, Vishal and their uncle, Ajay. Muskaan's childhood friend, Ujala, has been carrying a torch for the brooding Vishal since childhood, but he continues to ignore her. Muskaan wants to go to university in Mumbai and has to persuade her brother to attend. Once in the Mumbai Muskaan meets Suraj, an underachieving student estranged from his father and his stepmother. They soon fall in love but when Vishal comes to visit Muskaan, he is mistaken as her boyfriend by Suraj and his group of friends. A fight ensues but once he learns the truth he apologised. However Vishal disapproves of Suraj, believing he is physically unfit to meet his strict standards for a future brother-in-law and lacks maturity and competence. He decides to bring Muskaan back to the farm sensing Suraj's bad influence on her studies. Suraj pursues her and begins to work on the farm as a stable boy after a chance meeting with Ajay in which he saves his life. Vishal gives Suraj another chance and puts him to the test; however, he is rejected. Vishal wants Muskaan to marry the brother of Thakur Vijay Singh, not knowing that this is to exact revenge for a previous humiliation of his own family. Suraj sets out to stop him and win Vishal's heart. Ajay is half-shocked to learn the reason why Suraj came to the village. Suraj's friends tell his family about the village. Suraj's stepmother insults Muskaan, who runs away and accidentally runs into the Singh family and their henchmen. Suraj, his father, Vishal and Ajay arrive and rescue Muskaan. Suraj's stepmother calls the police thereby showing that she now cares for him. Vishal accepts Suraj as his future brother-in-law.

== Cast ==
- Dharmendra as Ajay Singh Thakur
- Salman Khan as Suraj Khanna
- Arbaaz Khan as Vishal Thakur
- Anjala Zaveri as Ujala
- Kajol as Muskaan Thakur
- Kiran Kumar as Akash Khanna, Suraj's father.
- Abu Malik as Trilok, Ujala's father
- Kunickaa Sadanand as Mrs. Khanna
- Aashif Sheikh as Inder Singh ,Thakur Vijay Singh's brother
- Ashok Saraf as Tadkalal
- Nirmal Pandey as Thakur Vijay Singh
- Tiku Talsania as Principal Narayan
- Razak Khan as Bholu
- Dinesh Hingoo as Laal ,Billu's father
- Ghanashyam Rohera as Principal Chirkoot
- Anik Khanna as Mana, Suraj's friend

== Music ==
Pyaar Kiya To Darna Kya

Soundtrack album by Jatin–Lalit, Himesh Reshammiya & Sajid–Wajid
- Released: 10 March 1998
- Genre: Feature film soundtrack
- Length: 43:42
- Label: T-Series

Jatin–Lalit chronology
Kuch Kuch Hota Hai (1998)	Pyaar Kiya To Darna Kya (1998)	Pyar To Hona Hi Tha (1998)

Himesh Reshammiya chronology
Pyaar Kiya To Darna Kya (1998)	Bandhan (1998)

The music for Pyaar Kiya To Darna Kya was composed by Jatin–Lalit, Himesh Reshammiya, and Sajid–Wajid. It was released by T-Series. The lyrics for all tracks by Jatin–Lalit were written by Sameer, the lyrics for Himesh Reshammiya's tracks were written by Sudhakar Sharma, and the lyrics for Sajid–Wajid's track was written by Iqbal Sabri. The soundtrack, especially the song "O O Jaane Jaana", became highly popular, and was one of the highest-selling albums of 1998. In Pagalpanti, the song "Tum Par Hum Hai" renames "Tum Par Hum Hai Atke" which is sung by Mika Singh, Neha Kakkar.

No.	Title	Music	Singer(s)	Length
1.	"Chhad Zid Karna"	Jatin-Lalit	Udit Narayan, Anuradha Paudwal	05:49
2.	"Odh Li Chunariya Tere Naam Ki"	Himesh Reshammiya	Kumar Sanu, Alka Yagnik	06:22
3.	"Tum Par Hum Hai Atke Yaara"	Himesh Reshammiya	Kavita Krishnamurthy, Kumar Sanu	05:21
4.	"Deewana Main Chala"	Jatin–Lalit	Udit Narayan	05:32
5.	"Teri Jawani Badi Mast Mast Hai"	Sajid–Wajid	Anupama Deshpande, Afzal Sabri, Iqbal Sabri, Shabab Sabri	05:30
6.	"O O Jaane Jaana"	Jatin-Lalit	Kamaal Khan	05:46
7.	"Oh Baby... Ho Gaya So Ho Gaya"	Jatin–Lalit	Kavita Krishnamurthy, Udit Narayan	04:14
8.	"O Sathiya O Beliya"	Jatin–Lalit	Anuradha Paudwal	05:08
Total length:				43:42

== Reception ==
Anupama Chopra of India Today wrote, "Of the 58 films released so far, only one, Pyar Kiya To Darna Kya (PKTDK), has hit the box office bull's-eye. Director Sohail Khan's mediocre Dilwale Dulhaniya Le Jayenge (DDLJ) rip-off, starring his brothers Salman and Arbaaz, rode to the top on the hit number 'O o jaane jaana'." Rediff.com called the film a "Hit."

== Awards ==
Awards	Category	Recipients and nominees	Results
44th Filmfare Awards	R. D. Burman Award for New Music Talent	Kamaal Khan for "O O Jaane Jaana"	Won
44th Filmfare Awards	Best Film	Sohail Khan and Bunty Walia	Nominated
44th Filmfare Awards	Best Director	Sohail Khan	Nominated
44th Filmfare Awards	Best Actor	Salman Khan	Nominated
44th Filmfare Awards	Best Supporting Actor	Arbaaz Khan	Nominated
44th Filmfare Awards	Best Music Director	Jatin–Lalit	Nominated
44th Filmfare Awards	Best Male Playback Singer	Kamaal Khan for "O O Jaane Jaana"	Nominated
