= Before You Die =

2022 Indian drama film

- Theatrical release poster
- Directed by: Suvendu Raj Ghosh
- Written by: Sanjeev Tiwari
- Screenplay by: Sanjeev Tiwari
- Story by: Pradip Chopra
- Produced by: Pradip Chopra
- Starring: Puneet Raj Sharma; Kavya Kashyap; Zarina Wahab; Mukesh Rishi; Pradip Chopra; Mushtaq Khan
- Cinematography: Arabinda Narayan Dolai
- Edited by: Raj Singh Sidhu
- Music by: Bob SN; Sharib Toshi
- Production company: iLead Films
- Distributed by: PVR Pictures
- Release date: 18 February 2022
- Country: India
- Language: Hindi

Before You Die is a Hindi romantic drama film directed by Suvendu Raj Ghosh and produced by Pradip Chopra. The film starring Puneet Raj Sharma, Kavya Kashyap, Zarina Wahab, Mukesh Rishi, Pradip Chopra, Mushtaq Khan, Arha Mahajan, Badshah Moitra, Rita Dutta and Lovekansh Garg, is a journey of a girl fighting cancer and her family. It is also a beautiful love story depicting courage and strength. The film is scheduled to be released on 18 February 2022.

== Cast ==
- Puneet Raj Sharma
- Kavya Kashyap
- Zarina Wahab
- Mukesh Rishi
- Pradip Chopra
- Mushtaq Khan

== Box office ==
As of 28 February 2022, the film grossed 0.15 crore in India.
