= Zindagi Shatranj Hai =

- Poster of Zindagi Shatranj Hai
- Directed by: Dushyant Pratap Singh
- Screenplay by: M. Salim
- Story by: M. Salim
- Produced by: Anand Prakash; Mrinalini Singh; Fahim R Qureshi
- Starring: Hiten Tejwani; Shawar Ali; Pankaj Berry; Hemant Pandey
- Cinematography: Suhas Rao
- Edited by: Sunil Yadav, Arun Yadav
- Music by: Anjjan Bhattacharya, Indrani Bhattarcharjee
- Production company: Anand Motion Pictures
- Distributed by: Jai Viratra Entertainment limited
- Release date: 20 January 2023
- Country: India
- Language: Hindi

Zindagi Shatranj Hai is a Hindi language film directed by Dushyant Pratap Singh. The film stars Hiten Tejwani, Shawar Ali, Pankaj Berry, Ashutosh Kaushik, Daler Mehndi Arjumman Mughal, Bruna Abdullah and Zaid Shaikh.

== Synopsis ==
The story of Zindagi Ek Shatranj is full of suspense and surprising twists and turns. A woman finds herself in dire straits when a man claims to be her husband. Meanwhile, serial murders are taking place in the city.

== Cast ==
- Hiten Tejwani
- Shawar Ali
- Daler Mehndi
- Arjumman Mughal
- Bruna Abdullah
- Hemant Pandey
- Pankaj Berry
- Zaid Shaikh
- Ashutosh Kaushik
- Rajkumar Kanojiya

== Awards ==
Year	Award	Category	Result
2024	Filmfare Awards	People's Choice	Nominated
