= Nilaanjana Bhattacharya =

Indian Bollywood actress and classical dancer

Nilaanjana is an Indian Bollywood actress and classical dancer. She has performed the dance form Kathak in more than 200 shows worldwide.

== Career ==
Nilaanjana started her career with Bengali film Shonar Sansar opposite Superstar Prosenjit Chatterjee. She has also acted in Hindi films like Zilla Ghaziabad, Right Yaaa Wrong, Halla Bol and recent Judwaa 2 as Kashi.

Not only has Nilaanjana performed in films, she has also appeared in commercials and theatre.

== Filmography ==
Name of Film	Year
Shonar Sansar	2002
Kuch Toh Gadbad Hai	2004
Halla Bol	2008
Right Yaaa Wrong	2010
Zilla Ghaziabad	2013
Judwaa 2	2017
