= Pyaar Impossible! =

- Theatrical release poster
- Directed by: Jugal Hansraj
- Written by: Uday Chopra
- Produced by: Uday Chopra
- Starring: Uday Chopra; Priyanka Chopra
- Cinematography: Santosh Thundiyil
- Edited by: Amitabh Shukla
- Music by: Salim–Sulaiman
- Production company: Yash Raj Films
- Distributed by: Yash Raj Films
- Release date: 8 January 2010
- Running time: 141 minutes
- Country: India
- Language: Hindi
- Budget: ₹14 crore

Pyaar Impossible! (transl. Love Impossible!) is a 2010 Indian Hindi-language romantic comedy film written by Uday Chopra and directed by Jugal Hansraj. Produced by Aditya Chopra under the banner of Yash Raj Films, the film stars Uday Chopra and Priyanka Chopra in the lead roles, with Advika Yadav, Anupam Kher, and Dino Morea. The film marked Priyanka Chopra's first collaboration with Yash Raj Films.

Principal photography took place in Singapore and Mumbai. The soundtrack was composed by Salim–Sulaiman, with lyrics written by Anvita Dutt.

Pyaar Impossible! was released theatrically on 8 January 2010 and received mixed reviews from critics, who praised the performances and music, but criticised the screenplay and pacing. Produced on a budget of ₹14 crore, the film grossed approximately ₹9.7 crore at the box office, underperforming at the box-office. This film, alongside Dulha Mil Gaya, were the first Bollywood films to be released in the 2010s.

== Plot ==
At Ankert University in California, Alisha Merchant is a popular and admired student, unaware that she is the object of affection for Abhay Sharma, an awkward and introverted computer science student. One night during a party, Alisha accidentally falls into a river. Abhay rescues her, but before she regains consciousness, her friends take her away. The next day, Alisha's father withdraws her from the university, and Abhay never has the chance to reveal his identity.

Seven years later, Abhay has developed a groundbreaking software program that enables seamless integration across all operating systems. During a meeting with a potential investor, he briefly steps away, only to return and discover that the investor—Siddharth "Siddhu" Singh—has stolen his software. Siddharth, whose real name is later revealed to be Varun Sanghvi, begins marketing the product in Singapore as his own.

Determined to reclaim his work, Abhay travels to Singapore and coincidentally encounters Alisha, who now works as a public relations representative at the same company. Due to a misunderstanding, she mistakes him for a nanny sent by an agency to look after her spirited daughter, Tanya. Recently divorced, Alisha is struggling to manage both her professional and personal responsibilities. Abhay assumes the role of Tanya's caretaker, concealing his true identity in order to remain close to Alisha.

Gradually, Abhay wins over Tanya and becomes an integral part of their household. Tanya nicknames him "Froggy" due to his appearance, while Abhay maintains the house with outside help and supports Alisha emotionally. As Siddharth re-enters Alisha's life and promotes the stolen software to her company, Abhay attempts to expose him while hiding his own identity. He also encourages Alisha to experience how society treats individuals based on their appearance by persuading her to dress down for a day.

Just before the software's official launch, Siddharth reveals Abhay's true identity to Alisha and claims that Abhay is a delusional impostor. Feeling betrayed, Alisha asks Abhay to leave. Tanya later informs her that Abhay was the person who saved her years ago at the university. Alisha realizes that Abhay had been in love with her all along.

Seeking redemption, Alisha finds Abhay and confesses her love. Together, they rush to the software launch event, where Abhay challenges Siddharth. When Siddharth fails to provide the system password, Abhay proves his authorship by entering it: "ALISHA." With the truth revealed, Siddharth is discredited. The film ends with Alisha, Abhay, and Tanya beginning a new life together.

== Cast ==
- Uday Chopra as Abhay "Froggy" Sharma
- Priyanka Chopra as Alisha Merchant
- Advika Yadav as Tanya Merchant
- Anupam Kher as Mr. Udesh Sharma
- Dino Morea as Varun Sanghavi alias Siddharth "Sidhu" Singh
- Rahul Vohra as Chandrakant Pandit "C.P."
- Madhura Naik as Alisha's friend
- Arjun Sablok as Jaspreet
- Saidah Jules as Madelyn
- Jugal Hansraj as the showroom manager
- Nataliya Kozhenova
- Shefali Rana as Jashmit
- Creighton Mark Johnson as Alisha's neighbor in a deleted scene

== Soundtrack ==
The soundtrack of Pyaar Impossible! was released on 14 December 2009. It was composed by Salim–Sulaiman with lyrics by Anvita Dutt Guptan. Two tracks were remixed by Abhijit Vaghani, and all songs were choreographed by Ahmed Khan.

Pyaar Impossible!

Soundtrack album by Salim–Sulaiman
- Released: 14 December 2009
- Genre: Feature film soundtrack
- Label: YRF Music
- Producer: Salim–Sulaiman

Salim–Sulaiman chronology
| Rocket Singh: Salesman of the Year (2009) | Pyaar Impossible! (2009) | Teen Patti (2010) |

Track listing

| No. | Title | Performer(s) | Length |
|---|---|---|---|
| 1. | "Alisha" | Anushka Manchanda, Salim Merchant | 04:50 |
| 2. | "10 on 10" | Anushka Manchanda, Mahua Kamat, Naresh Kamat | 03:30 |
| 3. | "Pyaar Impossible!" | Dominique Cerejo, Vishal Dadlani | 04:04 |
| 4. | "Ek Thi Ladki" | Rishika Sawant | 04:32 |
| 5. | "You and Me" | Neha Bhasin, Benny Dayal | 3:48 |
| 6. | "Alisha" (Remix) | Abhijit Vaghani | 03:57 |
| 7. | "Pyaar Impossible!" (Remix) | Abhijit Vaghani | 03:55 |
| Total length: | | | 28:36 |

== Reception ==
=== Box office ===
Pyaar Impossible! had a modest box office performance upon its release. It collected approximately ₹9.5 million on its opening day and went on to earn ₹34.8 million over its first weekend. The film concluded its domestic theatrical run with a net total of ₹58.9 million. Overseas, it grossed around $190,000 (₹8.5 million), bringing its worldwide total to approximately ₹89.5 million. Produced on a budget of ₹140 million, the film was declared a commercial failure by trade analysts.

=== Critical response ===
Pyaar Impossible! received mixed reviews from critics. While some praised its lighthearted tone and performances, others criticized the predictable storyline and superficial treatment of its themes. On the review aggregator Rotten Tomatoes, the film holds a rating of 40% based on five reviews.

In India, reviews highlighted both the film's charm and its limitations. Shubhra Gupta of The Indian Express awarded the film 1 out of 5 stars, writing, "How do you watch a film you know will pan out exactly as you think it will from its first frame? By sitting stoically through Pyaar Impossible!" Kaveree Bamzai of India Today criticized the film's central premise as implausible and remarked that its message about beauty and self-worth was diluted by superficial storytelling. The Times of India gave the film 3 out of 5 stars, describing it as "a decent one-time watch" and commending Priyanka Chopra’s performance, while observing that the film "doesn’t quite rise above its formulaic treatment." Sukanya Verma of Rediff.com described the film as lacking emotional investment and stated, "Pyaar Impossible! is shallow and predictable, offering little beyond surface-level cuteness." The Economic Times echoed similar sentiments, writing that the film "aims to be a charming rom-com but falls short due to its weak script and simplistic character arcs."

Among international critics, Rachel Saltz of The New York Times gave a positive review, writing, "Pyaar Impossible! shouldn’t work, but does. It’s sweet, and as far as formula goes, deftly done and satisfying." She also noted the film's conspicuous integration of Apple products. Frank Lovece of the Associated Press offered a contrasting perspective, labeling the film "a vanity project" and adding, "While love may or may not be impossible, nepotism is eternal."
