= Aayushkalam =

- Directed by: Kamal
- Written by: Vinu Kiriyath; Rajan Kiriyath
- Starring: Mukesh; Jayaram; Sreenivasan
- Cinematography: Saloo George
- Edited by: K. Rajagopal
- Music by: Ouseppachan
- Release date: 8 July 1992
- Country: India
- Language: Malayalam

Aayushkalam (transl. Lifetime) is a 1992 Indian Malayalam-language supernatural horror drama film directed by Kamal and written by Vinu Kiriyath and Rajan Kiriyath. It stars Mukesh and Jayaram in the lead roles and Sreenivasan in supporting role. The film was a commercial success at the box office. Aayushkalam is based on the Hollywood films Ghost and Heart Condition and was in turn remade in Hindi as Hello Brother.

== Plot ==
The film follows the story of Balakrishnan, a bank employee and a heart patient, yet he drinks and smokes a lot. He urgently falls in need of a heart transplant, for which he is unlikely to receive a heart and has given up all hope of living any longer. Luckily, he receives the heart of Abey Mathew, a youth who has just died in a car accident. The surgery is performed after both families agree to it. Gradually, Balakrishnan recovers from the surgery. Soon after he is discharged from the hospital, he visits the doctor and asks him who gave him the heart out of curiosity. Although initially reluctant, the doctor gives him the newspaper report about Abey's death which contains his photograph.

While leaving the hospital, Balakrishnan is frightened to see Abey's ghost and he is unable to escape from Abey's hold as he is able to follow him everywhere. Eventually, Abey starts following Balakrishnan at work, the restaurant, hospital and even at home, where he is initially not allowed to enter by the ghost of Balakrishnan's late father Gopala Menon, who is miserable because he cannot communicate with anyone but ghosts. Balakrishnan tries various methods to drive Abey's ghost out of the house, but all fail and makes everyone believe he has gone crazy. He especially has trouble because Abey is invisible to everyone but himself, and hilarity ensues. Balakrishnan eventually befriend Abey when the latter tells Balakrishnan that he was in fact murdered very unexpectedly on a road, by a man whom he could not identify, initially using a gun, but he was later run over by the vehicle while he was leaving to see his newborn child. Abey is seeking Balakrishnan's help to identify his murderer. Meanwhile, Balakrishnan visits Abey's family, meets his mother and wife Shobha with Abey's ghost.

Damodaran Nair, a Sub-Inspector, arrests Balakrishnan believing he is a flirt due to Abey's invisibility. He does not believe Balakrishnan when he talks about Abey's ghost and punishes him even more instead. To free Balakrishnan and to seek Damodaran's help Abey plays a trick on the latter to make him believe by visiting his house and he reluctantly does. Damodaran causes significant hilarity at this point, especially because he appears foolish and naive but shows off as though he is a wise and experienced policeman.

With the help of Damodaran, Balakrishnan and Abey discovers that Abey was murdered by a notorious criminal named Benjamin Bruno, who is now in jail for another murder case. Upon questioning, Bruno refuses to tell the truth and escapes from prison by acting as though he has fainted. However, Abey follows him and hears him talking on the phone to a mysterious person. Later, Abey sees Alex, his adopted brother talking to Bruno about his murder and that it needs to be covered up. Abey realises that Alex hired Bruno to kill Abey and to take over his businesses which he had inherited from their father. Abey informs Balakrishnan about the matter. Balakrishnan then informs the same to Abey's family who initially refuse to believe it. However, he tells them about Abey's ghost and with Abey helping Balakrishnan they do so. Alex kills Bruno fearing that the truth would come out soon. Damodaran refuses to help Balakrishnan and Abey anymore as he got suspended for the jail escape and death of Bruno.

As the story proceeds to the climax, Alex forces Shobha and Abey's mother to sign certain documents that make him the owner of all the businesses and assets that Abey had inherited from his father. He kidnaps Balakrishnan and threatens to destroy Abey's heart if they did not sign the documents. Abey decides to save them. He enters Damodaran's house and possesses his body. He fights with Alex and kills him. Alex's ghost rises and both face each other, soon Alex is sent to hell. Balakrishnan and Abey try to communicate with each other, but they no longer can do so. In the end, a divine light appears from the sky and transports Abey to heaven.

== Cast ==
- Mukesh as Balakrishnan
- Jayaram as Abey Mathew Chandanavelil, Ghost Spirit
- Sreenivasan as SI Damodaran Nair
- Sai Kumar as Alex Chandanavelil
- Maathu as Shobha, Abey's wife
- Rudra as Sujatha
- Kaviyoor Ponnamma as Abey's mother
- Gavin Packard as Benjamin Bruno
- Oduvil Unnikrishnan as Menon
- Siddique as Dr. Hariprasad
- Mamukkoya as Varghese
- Alummoodan as Velu Mooppan (voiceover by Dileep)
- Idavela Babu as Gopi
- K. P. A. C. Lalitha as Dakshayani
- Zeenath as Geetha
- N. F. Varghese as Police Officer
- T. P. Madhavan as Police Officer
- Abu Salim as Peter

Cameo appearance

- Dileep as Ghost (uncredited)
- Lal Jose as Ghost (uncredited)
- Innocent as Gopala Menon (Ghost)
- Charuhasan as Ghost
- Sankaradi as Ghost
- James as Auto Rikshaw Driver

== Soundtrack ==
The music was composed by Ouseppachan. "Mounam Swaramaayi"'s tune was reused in the song "Chitti Kuruvi" in the 2003 film Mullavalliyum Thenmavum, also composed by Ouseppachan, but the song is a bit western, starting from a humming by Unni Menon and Sujatha Mohan, both songs are in Kalyani (raga).

All lyrics are written by Kaithapram Damodaran; all music is composed by Ouseppachan.

No.	Title	Artist(s)	Length
1.	"Mounam Swaramaay"	K. J. Yesudas
2.	"Mounam Swaramaay" (Duet)	K. J. Yesudas, K. S. Chithra
