= 2014 Academy Awards =

2014 Academy Awards may refer to:

- 86th Academy Awards, the Academy Awards ceremony which took place in 2014
- 87th Academy Awards, the Academy Awards ceremony which took place in 2015 honoring the best in film for 2014
