= Sooper Se Ooper =

- Directed by: Shekhar Ghosh
- Written by: Shekhar Ghosh
- Starring: Vir Das; Kirti Kulhari; Gulshan Grover; Deepak Dobriyal; Yashpal Sharma; Mohan Kapoor
- Cinematography: Mohana Krishna
- Music by: Songs: Sonu Nigam; Bickram Ghosh; Background Score: Ranjit Barot; Lyrics Sanjeev Tiwari; Sonu Nigam
- Production companies: Reliance Entertainment; Jigsaw Pictures
- Release date: 25 October 2013
- Country: India
- Language: Hindi

Sooper Se Ooper (transl. Above super) is a 2013 Hindi film written & directed by Shekhar Ghosh, cinematography by Mohana Krishna under the banner of Reliance Entertainment and Jigsaw Pictures Pvt. Ltd. The trailer of this movie was released on 27 September and the movie on 25 October 2013.

== Cast ==
- Vir Das as Ranvir
- Kirti Kulhari as Gulabo
- Gulshan Grover as Madho Singh Rathod
- Deepak Dobriyal as Kukreja
- Yashpal Sharma as Bhairu
- Mohan Kapoor as Lal
- Datta Sonawane
- Vinod Nahardih as Tyagi Don
- Tinnu Anand as Salim Bhai

== Plot ==
Ranvir's fortune is in dumps, and selling his ancestral land in Mumbai is the only way to survive. Kukreja, who has put everything at stake, has to get this land to stay away from the wrath of a 'bhai' and also achieve his dream of becoming a builder. For both Ranvir and Kukreja, this plot of land means everything, and they need to get it by any means necessary. But the key to the land is Ranvir's mama, Madho Singh Rathore, in Mandawa, Jhunjhunu. Since the will wasn't made in Ranvir's name, Mama has to give the NOC. Ranvir has to get his mama to Mumbai within a month, and Kukreja has to stop him from reaching Mumbai. We see the transformation of our protagonist Ranvir from a materialistic city youth to someone who is all for family and values, and antagonist Kukreja from a 'dalla' to a gangster through this journey, which has some real and funny characters as well. In the 1st half, the city goes to a village, and in the 2nd, the village comes to the city.

== Filming ==
Vir Das was spotted in Jaipur, Rajasthan shooting for Sooper Se Ooper. After shooting in Mandawa, a small town near Jaipur for ten days, the cast and crew went to Jaipur to shoot at the airport. The scenes were shot in [Mandawa had actors Deepak Dobriyal & Gulshan Grover along with Kirti Kulhari, Yashpal Sharma. But the airport scene shot in Jaipur only had Vir Das. Das will be seen in two different avatars in the film – one in jeans-shirt, and the other sporting a dhoti and a pagadi with moustache. While shooting in Mandawa, Das had to sit on top of the camel for most of the scenes.

Kirti Kulhari will be portraying the role of a Rajasthani girl, Gulabo, the queen of Kalbeliya. She also had to sit atop camel carts. She will be seen wearing salwar-kameez and lehenga-choli in the movie.

Sooper Se Ooper stars Gulshan Grover as a don. Grover plays a London-based don who returns to his home town in Rajasthan where Deepak Dobriyal and Yashpal Sharma join as his accomplices. Das's love interest is Grover's daughter.

== Music ==
Sooper Se Ooper

Soundtrack album by Sonu Nigam – Vickram Ghosh
- Released: 15 October 2013
- Genre: Film soundtrack
- Length: 29:42
- Label: T-Series
- Producer: Sonu Nigam – Vickram Ghosh

Sonu Nigam – Vickram Ghosh chronology
Sooper Se Ooper (2013)	Jal (2013)

The music of the film was composed by the first time composer, singer Sonu Nigam and tabla player/percussionist Bickram Ghosh. The composer duo has also teamed up for two other film projects.

Sonu Nigam and Bickram Ghosh] have composed six songs for the film and made a very interesting and fresh album.

Track listing
No.	Title	Lyrics	Singer(s)	Length
1.	"Gunn Gunn Gutarr"	Sanjeev Tiwari	Amabarish Das, Parwati Kumari	5:23
2.	"Behka Behka"	Sanjeev Tiwari	Ash King, Teesha Nigam	5:00
3.	"Bajan De Dhol"	Sanjeev Tiwari	Mika Singh, Sowmya Raoh	4:18
4.	"Whacky Zindabad"	Sanjeev Tiwari	Anish, Oushnik Majumdar, Nevaan Nigam, Saloni, Rohini	5:08
5.	"Intaducing Gul"	Shabbir Ahmed, Sonu Nigam	Gunjan Singh	5:33
6.	"Sapna Mera"	Shabbir Ahmed	Sonu Nigam	4:20
Total length:				29:42
