= Via Darjeeling =

- Movie poster for Via Darjeeling
- Directed by: Arindam Nandy
- Produced by: Joy Ganguly
- Starring: Kay Kay Menon; Sonali Kulkarni; Vinay Pathak; Prashant Narayanan; Sandhya Mridul; Rajat Kapoor; Rupam Islam
- Cinematography: Avik Mukhopadhyay
- Edited by: Arghyakamal Mitra
- Music by: Prabuddha Banerjee; Lyrics; Sanjeev Tiwari; M K Singh
- Release date: 27 June 2008
- Running time: 1 hour 44 min
- Country: India
- Language: Hindi

Via Darjeeling is a 2008 Indian Hindi-language thriller drama film directed by Arindam Nandy. It stars Kay Kay Menon, Sonali Kulkarni, Vinay Pathak, Sandhya Mridul and Rajat Kapoor.

== Plot ==
The film revolves around the story of a honeymooning couple, Ankur and Rimli, who are very much in love. On the day of their departure from Darjeeling, Ankur disappears mysteriously, leaving Rimli all alone to frantically search for him. Here enters the policeman Robin Dutt, who tries to trace Ankur, but in vain. The story then moves onto a group of friends partying and having a good time, where Robin, who is one of the guests, narrates the story of Ankur and Rimli to his friends. How each one of them makes their own interpretations as to what happened to Ankur makes the rest of the movie.

== Cast ==
- Kay Kay Menon as Ankur Sharma
- Sonali Kulkarni as Rimli Sharma/Sangeeta
- Parvin Dabbas as Bonny/Rahul
- Prashant Narayanan as Kaushik Chatterjee
- Rajat Kapoor as Ronodeep Sen
- Simone Singh as Preeti Sen
- Sandhya Mridul as Mallika Tiwari
- Vinay Pathak as Inspector Robin Dutt
- Rupam Islam as a Bar Singer at Darjeeling

== Soundtrack ==
The music of this film was composed by Prabudhha Benerjee. This album features 10 tracks, sung by reputed singers like K.S.Chithra, Shaan, Sunidhi Chauhan & Kunal Ganjawala. The album consists of 6 songs and 4 instrumentals based on the theme for portraying characters in the film.

Track Listing
| No. | Title | Singer(s) | Length |
|---|---|---|---|
| 1. | "Ankur's Theme" | Prabudhha Benerjee | 1:43 |
| 2. | "Kahin Nahi (Version 1)" | Sunidhi Chauhan | 2:46 |
| 3. | "Sirf Ehasaas" | Kunal Ganjawala; Lyrics; Sanjeev Tiwari | 3:49 |
| 4. | "Baarish" | K.S.Chithra | 4:07 |
| 5. | "Uribar Swapan" | Karthik Das Baul | 4:10 |
| 6. | "Rimlee's Theme" | Prabudhha Benerjee | 2:18 |
| 7. | "Phir Bhi" | Kunal Ganjawala | 4:46 |
| 8. | "Kahin Nahi (Version 2)" | Shaan | 3:52 |
| 9. | "Bonny's Theme" | Prabudhha Benerjee | 1:08 |
| 10. | "Maalik & Kaushik's Theme" | Prabudhha Benerjee | 2:38 |
