= Rajkumar Kanojia =

Indian actor

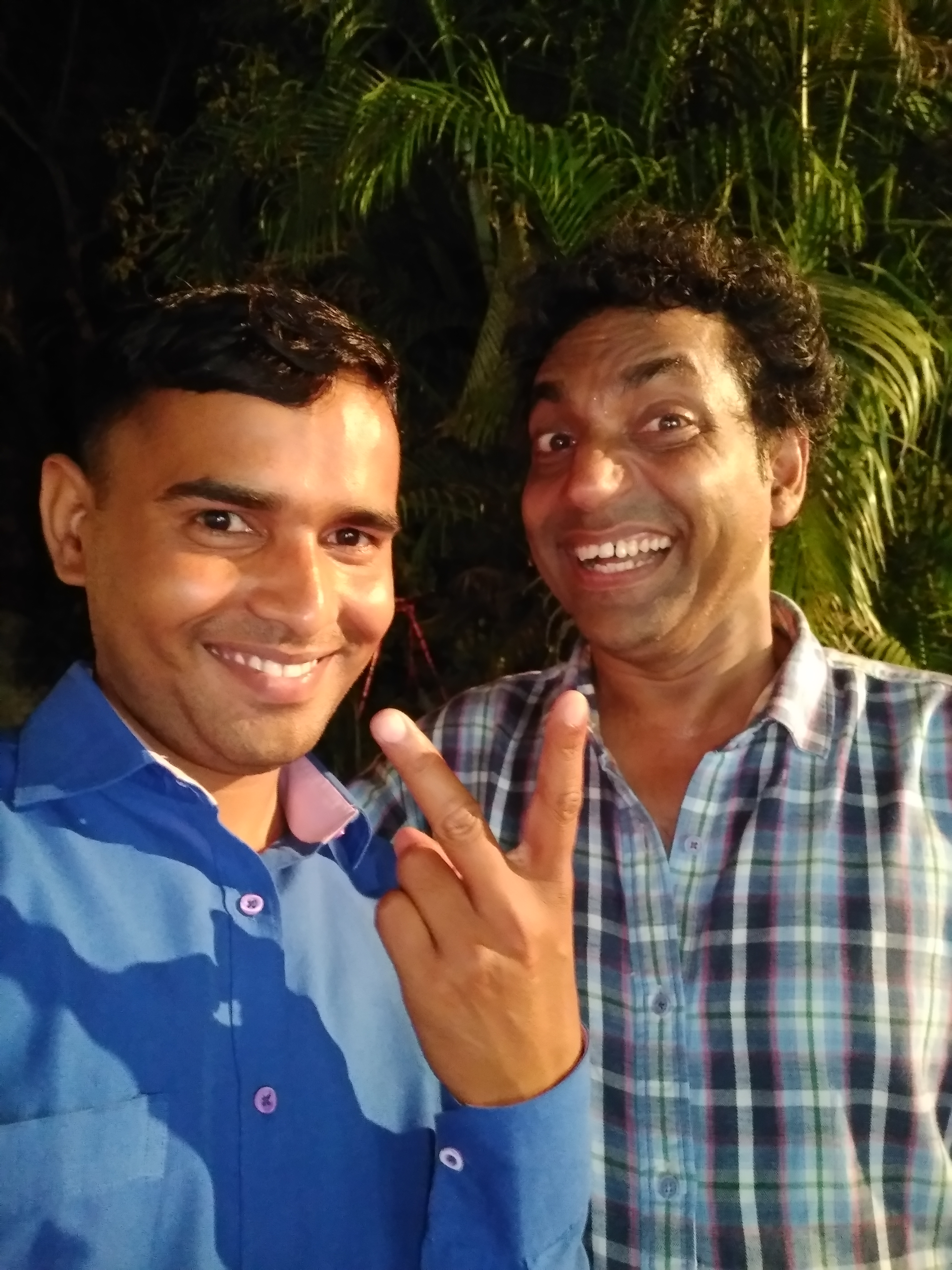
- Kanojia on the right
- Born: 11 June 1972 (age 54); Hardoi, Uttar Pradesh, India
- Education: Mumbai, Maharashtra, India
- Occupations: Film Actor, Television Actor
- Known for: Paisa Vasool, Style, Haasil

Rajkumar Kanojia (born 11 June 1972) is an Indian Bollywood Actor from Hardoi district of Uttar Pradesh, India.

Rajkumar is known for his comedic roles in numerous regional and international movies. He has also starred in many commercials and TV serials. He was awarded Best Maharashtra State Level – Best Actor Award in 1996-1997. In Bollywood he has worked in many films, including Paisa Vasool, Besharam, Dabangg 2, Bhabhipedia, Style, Oh My Friend Ganesha and many more.

Rajkumar has also appeared in 6 international films, and has acted in many renowned TV serials such as Balika Vadhu and Phulwa.

Rajkumar's upcoming movies are Bhabipedia, Brunei and Flame.

== Life and background ==
Rajkumar Kanojia is an Indian Film and Television actor from Hardoi, Uttar Pradesh, India. Kanojia was born on 11 June 1972 to Lata and Rambharose Kanojia. Shortly after his birth, the family moved to Mumbai and continues to live there. Rajkumar Kanojia completed his study from Tolani college of commerce (Mumbai, Maharashtra).

Rajkumar's mother (Lata Kanojia) is a housewife and his father worked in Qatar for 22 years. His wife (Rajeshree Kanojia) is an agent in Life Insurance Corporation of India (LIC). Rajkumar and Rajeshree have a son named Medhansh.

== Filmography ==
- Dil Pe Mat Le Yaar (2000)
- Style (2001)
- Rules: Pyaar Ka Superhit Formula (2003)
- Haasil (2003)
- Kahan Ho Tum (2003)
- Chupke Se (2003)
- Dhoop (2003)
- Paisa Vasool (2004)
- 99.9 FM (2005)
- Ho Sakta Hai (2006)
- Pyare Mohan (2006)
- Ram Gopal Varma Ki Aag (2007)
- One Two Three (2008)
- Apartment (2010)
- The Film Emotional Atyachar (2010)
- Paiyaa (2010; Tamil)
- Masti Express (2011)
- Shakal Pe Mat Ja (2011)
- Besharam (2013)
- Yeh Ishq Sarfira (2015)
- Faactory (2021)
- I Am Unused (2023)

=== Television ===
- Detective Onkar Nath (D.O.N.) (2006)
- Phulwa (2011–2012)
- Balika Vadhu (2012)
- Yam Hain Hum (2013–2014)
- Laal Ishq (Indian TV series) (2018)
- Chandrashekhar (TV series) (2021)
- Udne Ki Aasha (2024-2025; 2026)
- Tumm Se Tumm Tak (2025–present)
