= Mushtaq Khan =

Indian film and television actor and comedian (1950–2026)

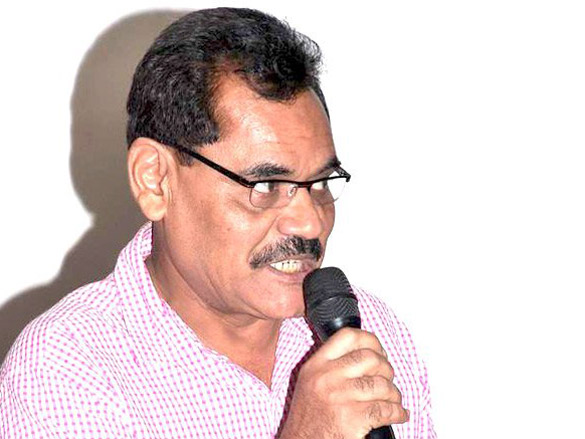
- Born: 1950; Baihar, Madhya Pradesh, India
- Died: 24 September 2026 (aged 75); Mumbai, Maharashtra, India
- Occupations: Actor; comedian
- Years active: 1975–2026
- Known for: Welcome
- Television: Hum Hain Rahi Pyar Ke; Jodi No.1; Welcome
- Spouse: Salma Khan
- Children: 2

Mushtaq Khan (1950 – 24 September 2026) was an Indian film and television actor and comedian who worked in several Hindi films in a career spanning three decades. He was best known for his roles in films such as Hum Hain Rahi Pyar Ke (1993), Jodi No.1 (2001) and Welcome (2007).

Mushtaq was born in Baihar town of Balaghat district, Madhya Pradesh, to a Muslim family. He was widely known for his role as a disabled hockey player in the film Welcome (2007).

== 2024 kidnapping ==
Khan was reportedly kidnapped on the Delhi-Meerut highway, with kidnappers demanding a ransom of ₹1 crore.

On 20 November 2024, Khan was invited by the kidnappers in the pretext of an award show in Meerut. According to his business partner Shivam Yadav, he was misled into a car upon arriving in Delhi and taken to a remote location near Bijnor, where he was tortured for 12 hours.

He managed to escape after hearing the morning Azaan and sought help from locals.

Initially, he did not file any complaint after escaping, but after a similar incident happened with comedian Sunil Pal, Khan registered an FIR in Bijnor, providing evidence including flight tickets, bank transactions, and CCTV footage, following Pal’s wife’s police complaint.

Uttar Pradesh Police identified two main accused named Lavi Pal and Arjun Karnwal behind both of the cases.

The Police arrested four accused identified as Sarthak Chaudhary, Sabiuddin, Azim, and Shashank involved in the case. Police also recovered ₹1 lakh from their possession.

The case drew attention due to its timing with the ongoing investigation into Sunil Pal's kidnapping case a week before Khan’s case.

== Death ==
Khan died at Nanavati Hospital in Mumbai, Maharashtra, on 24 September 2026.

== Filmography ==
=== Film ===
- Albert Pinto Ko Gussa Kyon Aata Hai (1980) – The Lecherous Shopper trying to flirt with 'Joan Pinto' (Smita Patil)
- Thodisi Bewafaii (1980) – Worker with sick wife – Mushtaq
- laraz (1981) – as a butcher
- Sazaye Maut (1981)
- Kaalia (1981) – Ram Deen
- Vivek (1985)
- Anjuman (1986) – Banke Nawab aka "Anjuman"
- Angaarey (1986)
- Kabzaa (1988) – Tiwari
- Main Azaad Hoon (1989) – Pandey
- Aakhri Ghulam (1989)
- Aashiqui (1990) – Rafoo Master (credited as Mustaque Khan)
- Baap Numbri Beta Dus Numbri (1990) – Police Inspector
- Dil Hai Ke Manta Nahin (1991) – Bus Conductor
- Saathi (1991) – Shetty
- Sadak (1991) – Pimp
- Lakshmanrekha (1991) – Dilawar Lahori
- Zulm Ki Hukumat (1992) – Prabhakar
- Dharavi (1992) – Shankar
- Saatwan Aasman (1992) – Usman Bhai
- Ek Ladka Ek Ladki (1992) – School Teacher
- Junoon (1992) – Adivasi Bheema
- Anaam (1992) – Inspector P.C. Yadav
- Pyar Pyar (1993) – Ram Sewak Gaitonde
- Aadmi (1993)
- Gunaah (1993) – Hotel Manager
- Lootere (1993) – Joshi
- Platform (1993) – Arjun
- Sir (1993) – Kalu Ba
- Hum Hain Rahi Pyar Ke (1993) – Bhagwati Prasad Mishra
- Gumrah (1993) – Bombay Police Inspector
- Krantiveer (1994) – Babbanrao Deshmukh
- Gopi Kishan (1994) – Police inspector Mishra
- Naaraaz (1994) – Zafir Khan
- Raja (1995) – Banwarilal Sanyal
- Milan (1995) – Havaldar Shantaram
- Gunehgar (1995) – Maulvi
- Baazi (1995) – Jamdaadey – Sub Inspector
- The Don (1995) – Prajapati
- Sarhad: The Border of Crime (1995) – Mr. Lobo
- English Babu Desi Mem (1996)
- Bambai Ka Babu (1996) – Commissioner – D.A. Chauhan
- Chaahat (1996) – Waiter – Anna
- Yash (1996) – Sharafat Ali
- Agni Prem (1996)
- Agnee Morcha (1997)
- Akele Hum Akele Tum (1997) – Lawyer Mr Bhatija
- Mrityudaata (1997) – Police Inspector Danapani
- Lahoo Ke Do Rang (1997) – Pappu Shikari
- Military Raaj (1998) – Minister Chedilal
- Major Saab (1998) – Hanuman Prasad
- Jab Pyaar Kisise Hota Hai (1998) – Singh
- Lohpurush (1999) – Havaldar P.K. Mast
- Rajaji (1999) – Kalicharan aka Kadwa
- Teri Mohabbat Ke Naam (1999) – Police Constable Pyarelal
- Mann (1999) – News Reporter
- Hera Pheri (2000) – Devi Prasad's servant
- Hamara Dil Aapke Paas Hai (2000)
- Gadar: Ek Prem Katha (2001) – Gul Khan
- Jodi No.1 – (2001) – Casino Manager De Costa
- Dal: The Gang (2001) – Banarasi
- Dil Ne Phir Yaad Kiya (2001)
- Be-Lagaam (2002) – Policeman with Tanveer Zaidi
- Ek Aur Ek Gyarah (2003) – Inspector Bahadur Singh
- 30 Days (2004) – Havaldar Gangaram
- Mujhse Shaadi Karogi (2004) – Chutki Baba
- Dhamkee (2005) – Karim Bhai
- Rehguzar (2006) – Parvez
- Sandwich (2006) – Popatlal
- Khallas: The Beginning of End (2007) – Shinde
- Life Mein Kabhie Kabhiee (2007) – Monica's Agent
- My Friend Ganesha (2007)
- Welcome (2007) – Ballu
- Ishq Ho Gaya Mamu (2008) – Shayer e Aazam
- Black and White (2008) – Mohanlal Agarwal – MLA
- Mehbooba (2008)
- Good Luck! (2008) – Tarun's General Manager
- Ek Vivaah... Aisa Bhi (2008) – Whistler in bus
- Oh, My God (2008) – Inspector Rana
- Aasma: The Sky Is the Limit (2009) – Kamlesh Pandey
- Short Kut (2009) – Gayetri's dad
- Aakhari Decision (2010) – Ranjeet (as Mushtaque Khan)
- Wanted (2010) – Police inspector
- My Friend Ganesha 3 (2010) – Shivdhar Pandurang Kamble
- Apartment (2010) – Watchman Mishra
- That Girl in Yellow Boots (2011)
- Shagird (2011) – Jailor
- Rascals (2011) – Usman
- Rowdy Rathore (2012) – Baapji's assistant
- Kunba (2012)
- Once Upon ay Time in Mumbai Dobaara! – Aslam (Imran's Dad)
- Dee Saturday Night (2014)
- Dil Mangey Kuchh Aur (2014)
- Gurjar Aandolan A Fight for Right (2014) – Manohar Gurjar (Gurjar Leader) (Directed by Aarun Nagar)
- Haunted Rooh (2015) – Directed by Jitendra Singh
- Bas Ek Chance (2015) – Gujarati Movie Directed By Kirtan Patel
- Welcome Back (2015) – Ballu
- Romeo & Radhika (2016) Gujarati Film
- Miss Teacher (2016) – Directed By Jai Prakash
- Final Cut of Director (2016)
- Laadli (2017) – Rajasthani film
- When Obama Loved Osama (2018)
- Bala (2019) – Lawyer
- Dolly Kitty Aur Woh Chamakte Sitare (2020)
- Incredible India (2020)
- Secret Pocketmaar (2021)
- Before You Die (2022)
- Hai Tujhe Salaam India (2022)
- Saurashtra (2022)
- Gadar 2 (2023) as Gul Khan
- Stree 2 (2024) as MLA
- I Am Unused – MX Player Web-Series
- Cocaine
- Jaat (2025) as Inspector Mushtaq
- Udaipur Files (2025) as Virendra Kumar Meena
- Kis Kisko Pyaar Karoon 2 (2025)
- Bhabiji Ghar Par Hain! Fun on the Run (2026)
- Hum Angrezon Ke Zamane Ke Jailor Hai (2026)

=== Television ===
- Zee Horror Show as Gangva mayuri Father in Aafat
- Kuch Rang Pyar Ke Aise Bhi – Baldev Tripathi (2016–17)
- Adaalat – Jhillmill "KD's Friend" (2010–11)
- Chacha Chaudhary
- Tedhe Medhe Sapne – (2001)
- Chamatkar – N.D. Tiwari (1996)
- Devta – (1999)
- Hum Sab Ek Hain – (1999) (Episode 66)
- Bharat Ek Khoj(1988)....Miyan Buvan episode 31-Rana Sanga, Ibrahim Lodhi and Babur
- Wagle Ki Duniya(1988).... as

Manohar- episode Landlord

- Wapas Chalo......as Allayddin

TV Short Film (1984)

- Nukkad(1986)....as Prabhakar- episode Mystery Woman
- Belan Wali Bahu (2018) as Premnath Avasthi
- Kuch Rang Pyar Ke Aise Bhi Season 3 – Baldev Tripathi (2021)
- Hume Toh Loot Liya (2023)...MX Player film
- The Railway Men (2023)...Netflix Series

== Awards ==
Year	Award	Category	Serial	Outcome
2002	Indian Telly Awards	Best Actor in a Comic Role	Tedhe Medhe Sapne	Nominated
2017	Lions Gold Awards	Best Favourite Actor in a Supporting Role	Kuch Rang Pyar Ke Aise Bhi	Won
