= Jagaddhatri (disambiguation) =

Jagaddhatri is an aspect of the Hindu goddess Durga.

Jagaddhatri or Jagadhatri may also refer to:

- Jagaddhatri (TV series), a 2022 Bengali language series
- Jagadhatri, a 2023 remake of the Bengali series in Telugu
- Jagadhatri (TV series), 2025 remake of the Bengali series in Hindi
