= Hriday Haran B.A. Pass =

Indian Bengali television series

- Promotional image
- Genre: Drama; Comedy; Romance
- Created by: Blues Productions
- Written by: Snehasish Chakraborty
- Directed by: Bijoy Maji
- Starring: Joey Debroy; Roshni Tanwi Bhattacharya; Indrakshi Dey
- Voices of: Trisha Parui
- Composer: Snehasish Chakraborty
- Country of origin: India
- Original language: Bengali
- No. of seasons: 1
- No. of episodes: 495

Production
- Producer: Snehasish Chakraborty
- Production location: Kolkata
- Running time: 21 minutes
- Production company: Blues Productions

Original release
- Network: Zee Bangla
- Release: 13 August 2018 – 5 January 2020

Hriday Haran B.A. Pass is an Indian Bengali-language comedy-drama television series that premiered on 13 August 2018. The series was broadcast on the Bengali television channel Zee Bangla, and streamed on the digital platform ZEE5. Produced by Blues Productions, the show stars, movie star Joey Debroy as the protagonist of the show and for the first time on television show. Roshni Tanwi Bhattacharya in lead roles and Goutam De, Jayant Dutt Barman and Siddhartha Bandyopadhyay in supporting roles. The show is written by Snehasish Chakroborty, known for Khokababu, Jarowar Jhumko, Tumi Robe Nirobe, and Rakhi Bandhan.

== Plot ==
The story revolves around a young couple, Hridoy and Pekham. Hriday as he is referred to, is the black sheep of the family - unemployed and uneducated - only interested in music. Hriday then makes the ultimate sacrifice, leaves his career as a lyricist and becomes a driver at Pekham's house. Pekhem is a smart but difficult to manage girl. She happens to be a great fan of singer Sid and later fall in love with him. Pekham's father arranges his daughter's marriage with a man who is simple, traditional and homely. But Pekhem runaway on her wedding day with the help of driver Hriday to marry her long time boyfriend singer Sid. But both Hridoy and Pekham's families think that Hriday enlopes Pekhem to marry her and they disown them for this mistake, the couple is forced to live in a boarding house with bachelors.

== Cast ==
- Joey Debroy as Hridayharan/ Sreemodhayam
- Roshni Tanwi Bhattacharya as Pekhom
- Indrakshi Dey as Deepika
- Gautam De as Hriday 's Father
- Bimal Chakraborty as Pekhom's Father
- Suchismita Chowdhury as Pekhom's mother/Kadombori
- Rumpa Das as Palak/Pekhom's Sister
- Diya Basu as Pekhom's Cousin
- Sourav Banerjee as Pekhom's Cousin
- Ratna Ghoshal as Pekhom's grandmother
- Srabanti Mukherjee as Pekhom's aunt
- Arun Saha as Mosaheb/Pekhom's Father's Secretary
- Siddhartha Banerjee as Hriday 's Brother
- Sayantani Majumdar as Hriday's Sister-in-law
- Jayanta Dutta Barman as Hriday's Brother
- Arpita Dutta Chowdhury as Hriday's sister-in-law
- Manoj Ojha as Shyamacharan
- Mafin Chakraborty as Payel
- Kanchana Maitra as Bina
- Ritu Rai Acharya as Gongur
- Piyali Mukherjee as Piyali
- Maitreyee Ghatak as Jipsi
- Monalisa Das as Jonaki
- Soumik Saha as Palak's husband
- Dwaipayan Chakraborty as Sid
- Soma Banerjee as Sid's mother
- Twarita Chatterjee as Kaya
- Papiya Adhikari as Munni
