= Jarowar Jhumko =

Bengali television series

- Genre: Drama
- Created by: Blues Productions
- Written by: Snehasish Chakraborty
- Directed by: Prosenjit Roy
- Starring: Shweta Bhattacharya; Subhankar Saha; Ankita Majumder; Subhasish Mukherjee; Dipankar De
- Opening theme: "Jarowar Jhumko"
- Composer: Snehasish Chakraborty
- Country of origin: India
- Original language: Bengali
- No. of episodes: 420

Production
- Producers: Snehasish Chakraborty; Debasish Chakraborty
- Production location: Kolkata
- Running time: 22 minutes
- Production company: Blues Productions

Original release
- Network: Zee Bangla
- Release: 22 August 2016 – 26 November 2017

Jarowar Jhumko is a Bengali television soap opera that premiered on 22 August 2016, aired on Zee Bangla. Produced by Snehasish Chakraborty, under Blues Productions, it stars Shweta Bhattacharya and Subhankar Saha in lead roles after starring together in Tumi Robe Nirobe. The show was telecasted from Monday to Sunday at 8:00 P.M. The show aired its final episode on 26 November 2017.

== Plot ==
Everyone thinks Jhumko is dead except Kohinoor, Hirok and Panna Lal. One day Kohinoor sees Jhumko in Biju's house. However, Jhumko is hiding her identity from Ginni Roy. She wants to take revenge from Ginni Roy for trying to kill her. Ginni Roy goes to a jewelry store where she chooses the best necklace for Tikli. But someone snatches it from her and that person buys with. The price was 50 lakhs but that person doubles the amount to 75 lakhs. Ginni Roy is shocked by hearing the price. She does not know that it is Jhumko who brought the necklace. Kohinoor, Tridha, and Tikli Biju's wedding rituals are going on. Jhumko says she will come at the wedding day of Biju and Tikli to shock Ginni Roy. Finally, Jhumko gets to know her mother's killers: they are none other than Hirok, Ginni Roy, and Kohinoor's mother. Jhumko vows to take revenge from all her mother's killers. Also, everyone in the Roy mansion gets to know that Jhumko is alive by Ginni Roy's informer. Later, Jhumko comes in front of everyone on the wedding occasion of Biju and Tikli and Trida is betrayed once again and she vows revenge on everyone.

== Cast ==
- Shweta Bhattacharya as Jhumko
- Subhankar Saha as Kohinoor
- Ankita Majumder as Jorowa
- Subhasish Mukherjee as Ajit Karmakar
- Madhurima Paul as Tridha
- Debjani Chattopadhyay as Gini
- Dipankar De as Pannalal Roy
- Kanchana Moitra as Ellora/Shona Bou
- Kushal Chakraborty as Hirak
- Arijit Chowdhury as Indranil Roy
- Sudipa Basu as Bhalo Bou
- Rajat Ganguly as Pannalal Roy's brother
- Twarita Chatterjee as Nolok
- Pushpendu Roy as Joy
- Meghna Mukherjee as Gunja
- Misty Das as Tikli
- Dolon Roy as Neelima Bose Jorowa's Saviour
- Arnab Chowdhury / Sabyasachi Chowdhury as Arnab
- Aloke Chatterjee as Mahendra
- Sanjib Sarkar as Rambesh
- Sucheta Chakraborty as Ator Masi
- Saurav Das as Baju
- Aritra Dutta as Beeru
- Soma Banerjee as Beeru's Mother
- Sankar Debnath as Beeru's father

== Remake ==
In Telugu it is remade on Zee Telugu channel named Swarna Palace. The series began on 26 July 2021.
