= Jai Kanhaiya Lal Ki =

Jai Kanhaiya Lal Ki (lit. 'Hail Lord Krishna') may refer to these in Indian entertainment:

- Jai Kanhaiyalall Ki, a 2026 Indian Gujarati-language family drama film
- Jai Kanhaiya Lal Ki (2018 TV series), a 2018 Indian Hindi-language comedy television series
- Jai Kanhaiya Lal Ki (2021 TV series), a 2021 Indian Hindi-language mythological television series
