= Ayali (2025 TV series) =

2025 Indian Tamil language TV series

- Genre: Drama; Romance; Thriller; Crime
- Developed by: Snehasish Chakraborty; Blues Productions
- Screenplay by: Sanju M
- Story by: Snehasish Chakraborty
- Directed by: Parameshwarar
- Starring: Tejaswini Gowda; Anand Selvan
- Country of origin: India
- Original language: Tamil
- No. of episodes: 461

Production
- Producer: S. Sabarshkumar
- Cinematography: Jo.e
- Editor: Mojith
- Camera setup: Multi-camera
- Running time: 22 minutes
- Production company: Monk Studios

Original release
- Network: Zee Tamil
- Release: 2 June 2025 – present

Related
- Jagaddhatri

Ayali is a 2025 Indian Tamil language crime Thriller Drama series that premiered from 2 June 2025 airing on Zee Tamil. It is an official remake of Bengali language television series Jagaddhatri. It stars Tejaswini Gowda and Anand Selvan and is directed by Parameshwarar. It portrays the story of an undercover cop, Ayali (Tejaswini Gowda) and her fellow police officer Siva (Anand Selvan).

== Plot ==
Shunned by her family over false accusations against her mother, Ayali tolerates her stepmom’s cruelty and teams up with Siva to expose Varma and prove her mother's innocence.

== Cast ==
=== Main ===
- Tejaswini Gowda as Ayali a.k.a AD
  - Riya Manoj as Young Ayali
- Anand Selvan as Shiva a.k.a SV

=== Recurring ===
- Vidhya as Indrani: Shiva's elder sister
- Santosh R Daniel as Kabilan: Shiva's half-brother
- Akshitha Bopaiah as Rithika: Ayali's half-sister
- Lakshmi Vasudevan / Kavitha Solairaja as Selvanayagi: Shiva's stepmother
- Vetri Kiran / Jeeva Ravi as Udhayaperumal: Shiva's father
- Ram G as Varman (Main Antagonist)
- Parthan Siva as Kaliappan: Shiva's uncle
- Feroz Khan as Cheziyan: Indrani's husband
- Birla Bose as IG Vijayakumar: Reshma's father
- Harikrishnan as Ravi: Ilakkiya's husband
- Swetha as Chellamma: Ayali’s Aunt
- Aarthi Ramkumar / Vasavi as Jamuna: Ayali's stepmother
- Ratna Rajan as Ponni: Shiva's half-sister
- Shilpa / Caroline as Karthika: Kaliappan's wife
- Rishi Keshav as Devaraj: Ayali’s father
- Nithya Ravindar as Padma: Ayali's grandmother
- Manusri Karthikeyan / Aishwarya Subramanian as Deepthi: Ayali's cousin
- Radhika Preethi / Gracy Thangavel as Reshma: Shiva's deceased friend
- Suresh Mohan as John: AD's team-mate
- Chandini Prakash as Monica: Indrani's arch-rival
- Revathee Shankar as Thulasi: Indrani's mother
- Deepa Nethran as Sankari: Shiva's deceased mother
- Kasthuri Shankar / Keerthana as Archana IPS: Ayali's mother
- Ashok Samuel as Journalist Narayanan: Chellama's deceased husband
- Narasimha Raju as Sampath: Archana's deceased brother
- Pankajam as Maragatham
- Premi Venkat as Akhilandeshwari
- Priyanka Nalkari as Pallavi
- Babloo Prithiveeraj as Vikram
- Sona Heiden as Governor of Tamil Nadu

== Production ==
=== Casting ===
After Vidhya No.1, Tejaswini Gowda made a comeback through this series as "Ayali". Anand Selvan was selected to play the role of police officer Siva. It was second collaboration with Zee Tamil after Ninaithale Inikkum serial. Kasthuri Shankar was selected to play the role of police officer.

== Adaptations ==
Language	Title	Original release	Network(s)	Last aired	Notes
Bengali	Jagaddhatri জগদ্ধাত্রী	29 August 2022	Zee Bangla	14 December 2025	Original
Telugu	Jagadhatri జగద్ధాత్రి	21 August 2023	Zee Telugu	Ongoing	Remake
Punjabi	Sehajveer ਸਹਿਜਵੀਰ	25 March 2024	Zee Punjabi	31 May 2025	Remake
Tamil	Ayali அயலி	2 June 2025	Zee Tamil	Ongoing	Remake
Marathi	Taarini तारिणी	11 August 2025	Zee Marathi	Ongoing	Remake
Hindi	Jagadhatri जगद्धात्री	10 November 2025	Zee TV	27 November 2026	Remake
Malayalam	Durga ദുർഗ്ഗ	17 November 2025	Zee Keralam	Ongoing	Remake
Kannada	Jagaddhatri ಜಗದ್ಧಾತ್ರಿ	28 September 2026	Zee Kannada	Ongoing	Remake
