= Soma Dey =

Indian actress

- Years active: 1974―Present
- Spouse: Bibek Chatterjee
- Children: Syamantak Chatterjee; Jagyaseni Chatterjee
- Parent(s): Upen Chandra Dey (father); Parul Dey (mother)

Soma Dey (Bengali: সোমা দে) is an Indian actress who is known for her work in Bengali cinema. She is best known for her role as Chintamani in Govinda Ray's Bilwamangal (1976).

Soma Dey made her big screen debut with Haraye Khunji (1974) and subsequently appeared in films such as Janmabhumi (1974), Bilwamangal (1976), Bondi Bidhata (1976), Shankhabish (1976), Sudur Niharika (1976) and Barbadhu (1978).

== Career ==
Soma Dey made her big screen debut with Swadesh Sarkar's Haraye Khunji (1976). In the same year she starred in Piyush Kanti Ganguly's Janmabhumi (1974). She was Bilwamangal (1976) and Byapika Biday (1980) gave her prominence.

== Filmography ==
Year	Film	Director	Role played	Ref.
1974	Haraye Khunji	Swadesh Sarkar		
1974	Janmabhumi	Piyush Kanti Ganguly		
1975	Selam Memsaheb	Mrinal Guhathakurta		
1976	Bilwamangal	Gobinda Ray		
1976	Bondi Bidhata	Prabhat Mukhopadhyay		
1976	Shankhabish	Rathish Dey Sarkar		
1976	Sudur Niharika	Sushil Mukhopadhyay		
1978	Barbadhu			
1978	Tusi			
1979	Lattu	Ajit Ganguly		
1980	Byapika Biday	Archan Chakraborty		
1981	Shahar Theke Dure	Tarun Majumdar		
1982	Mayer Ashirbad			
1983	Jini Ram Tini Krishna — Eki Dehe Ramkrishna			
1984	Rajeswari			
1984	Sagar Balaka			
1985	Aloy Phera			
1989	Aamar Shapath			
1989	Natun Surya			
1990	Kalanka			
1996	Bhai Amar Bhai			
1999	Gunda			
1999	Priyojon			
2000	Ashray			
2000	Bastir Meye Radha			
2000	Debanjali			
2000	Madhur Milan			
2000	Rupasi Dohai Tomar			
2000	Shapath Nilam			
2001	Aami Jibonpurer Pathik			
2001	Ostad			
2002	Nishana			
2003	Jua			
2003	Rasta			
2004	Abhishek			
2004	Akritagya			
2004	Atotayee			
2004	Bandhan	Ravi Kinagi		
2004	Mon Jake Chay			
2004	Ram Lakshman			
2004	Swapne Dekha Rajkanya			
2005	Dwiragaman			
2005	Manik			
2005	Shunya E Buke	Kaushik Ganguly		
2006	Eri Naam Prem			
2006	Tobu..Aste Habe Phire			
2007	Ballyganj Court	Pinaki Chaudhury		
2009	1 No. Plum Villa		Amma	
2009	Brake Fail		Pratima	
2010	Banshiwala		Pishi	
2010	Prem By Chance		Grandmother of Purna	
2011	Mone Mone Bhalobasa		Ganga's Mother	
2011	Punorutthan		Mahendra Mallick's Wife	
2011	Ekdin Thik		Soumen's Wife	
2012	Palatak		Srinath's Wife	
2013	Encounter		Bijoy's Mother	

== TV shows ==
Year	Title	Role	Production company	Channel
2000– 2005	Ek Akasher Niche	Amma	Ravi Ojha Productions	Zee Bangla
2009–2014	Agnipariksha	Nirupoma	Acropoliis Entertainment	Zee Bangla
2010–2013	Behula	Behula's grandmother	Svf Production	Star Jalsha
2020–2022	Jamuna Dhaki	Bindubashini Debi	Blues Productions	Zee Bangla
2021–2022	Khukumoni Home Delivery	Basudha Chowdhury	Blues Productions	Star Jalsha
2022	Madhabilata	Sabuj's grandmother	Blues Productions	Star Jalsha
2022–2025	Jagaddhatri	Mahasweta Sanyal	Blues Productions	Zee Bangla
2023	Mukut	Suhashini Roy Chowdhury	Blues Productions	Zee Bangla
2023	Nayika No.1	Labonyyo Prova Sen	Blues Productions	Colors Bangla
2023–2024	Tumi Ashe Pashe Thakle	Thammi	Svf Production	Star Jalsha
2024	Diamond Didi Zindabad	Rani Pisi	Tanirika Talkies	Zee Bangla
2025	Sholok Saree		Blues Productions	Sun Bangla
2025–2026	Besh Korechi Prem Korechi		Blues Productions	Zee Bangla
2026	Kusum	Tarulata Ganguly	Acropoliis Entertainment	
