= Parashuram – Ajker Nayok =

Bengali crime thriller television series

- Genre: Romance; Thriller; Action; Social issue
- Created by: Snehasish Chakraborty
- Developed by: Snehasish Chakraborty; Blues Productions
- Written by: Blues Productions
- Screenplay by: Snehasish Chakraborty
- Story by: Snehasish Chakraborty
- Directed by: Arghya Paik
- Starring: Indrajeet Bose; Trina Saha
- Country of origin: India
- Original language: Bengali
- No. of episodes: 614

Production
- Producers: Snehasish Chakraborty; Debasish Chakraborty; Rupsha Chakraborty
- Production locations: Kolkata; West Bengal
- Editors: Ajahar; Bapon Pramanik
- Camera setup: Multi camera
- Running time: 20–40 minutes
- Production company: Blues Productions

Original release
- Network: Star Jalsha
- Release: 10 March 2025 – present

Related
- Mr. and Mrs. Parshuram

Parashuram – Ajker Nayok (transl. Parshuram – Today's Hero) is an Indian Bengali-language action thriller romantic drama television series that premiered from 10 March 2025 on Star Jalsha and streams digitally on JioHotstar. Produced by Snehasish Chakraborty under the banner of Blues Productions, it stars Indrajeet Bose as undercover agent Parshuram and Trina Saha as Totini.

== Plot ==
Undercover agent Parshuram is the savior we need. But for the world, he is a next-door family man.

== Cast ==
=== Main ===
- Indrajeet Bose as Shivprasad Ganguly aka Parshuram - A Secret Intelligence officer, Totini's husband, Lattu and Piku's father, Shibani's brother
- Trina Saha as Totini Ganguly (née Mukherjee), A Secret Special Branch officer, Parshuram's wife, Lattu and Piku's mother, Babin and Nandini's sister

=== Recurring ===
- Sanghamitra Talukder as Shikha Roy aka Sheetal - A woman Gangster from Bhagalpur, Parshuram's obsessive lover
- Madhurima Paul as Shivani Ganguly - Shivprasad's sister
- Kaushik Banerjee as Satyajit Mukherjee - Babin, Nandini and Totini's father.
- Bharat Kaul as Jeet Mukherjee - Satyajit's brother, Aradhya and Ayushi's father
- Ayushri Mukherjee as Tanisha aka Piku Ganguly - Parshuram and Totini's daughter, Lattu's sister
- Avinava Biswas / Sarthak Mullick as Lattu Ganguly - Parshuram and Totini's son, Piku's brother
- Priya Paul as Nandini Mukherjee - Totini and Babin' sister, A lawyer.
- Gourab Ghoshal as Indrajit Mukherjee aka Babin - Satyajit's son, Nandini and Totini's brother, Bhumika's husband.
- Shampa Banerjee as Bhumika Mukherjee (née Sharma) aka Bhumi - Babin's wife.
- Srija Mondal as Aradhya Chatterjee (née Mukherjee) - Ayushi's sister, Jeet's elder daughter.
- Yaman Ghosh as Kabir Chatterjee
- Jina Tarafder as Ayushi Lahiri (née Mukherjee) - Jeet's younger daughter, Aradhya's sister
- Sayan Karmakar as Bijit Lahiri
- Neel Mukherjee as Karna Chatterjee
- Suchismita Chowdhury
- Riya Saha as Sandipta Basu aka Maya
- Sourav Banerjee as Sourav
- Debjoy Mallick as Balaram Ghosh
- Priyanka Mukherjee as Nanda
- Sandip Bhattacharya
- Tapasya Dasgupta
- Atri Bhattacharya

== Production ==
=== Development ===
Screenwriter Snehasish Chakraborty who has previously written down the scripts for Geetha LL.B, Jagaddhartri and Khelaghor developed the central plot for Parashuram – Ajker Nayok.

=== Casting ===
Indrajeet Bose was signed to play dual character Parshuram while Trina Saha was roped to portray his on-screen wife, Tatini.

== Crossovers ==
On 15 August 2026, The series had a crossover episode with Professor Bidya Banerjee as Independence Day special episode.

== Reception ==
=== Ratings ===
Since the inception, the series has been a topper in the BARC chart with the range from 5.0 to 8+ TRP.

Week	Year	BARC TRP	Rank		Ref.
Week	Year	BARC TRP	Star Jalsha	West Bengal	Ref.
Week 29	2025	7.5	1	1	
Week 34	2025	7.1	1	1	
Week 38	2025	6.5	1	1	
Week 50	2025	7.0	1	1	
Week 1	2026	7.2	1	1	
Week 2	2026	7.3	1	1	
Week 4	2026	7.3	1	1	
Week 22	2026	4.8	1	1	
Week 23	2026	5.2	1	3	
Week 24	2026	5.1	1	2	

== Adaptations ==
Language	Title	Original Release	Network(s)	Last aired	Notes	Ref.
Hindi	Mr. and Mrs. Parshuram मिस्टर एंड मिसेज परशुराम	3 February 2026	StarPlus	18 August 2026	Remake	
