= Sudipa Basu =

Indian film and television actress

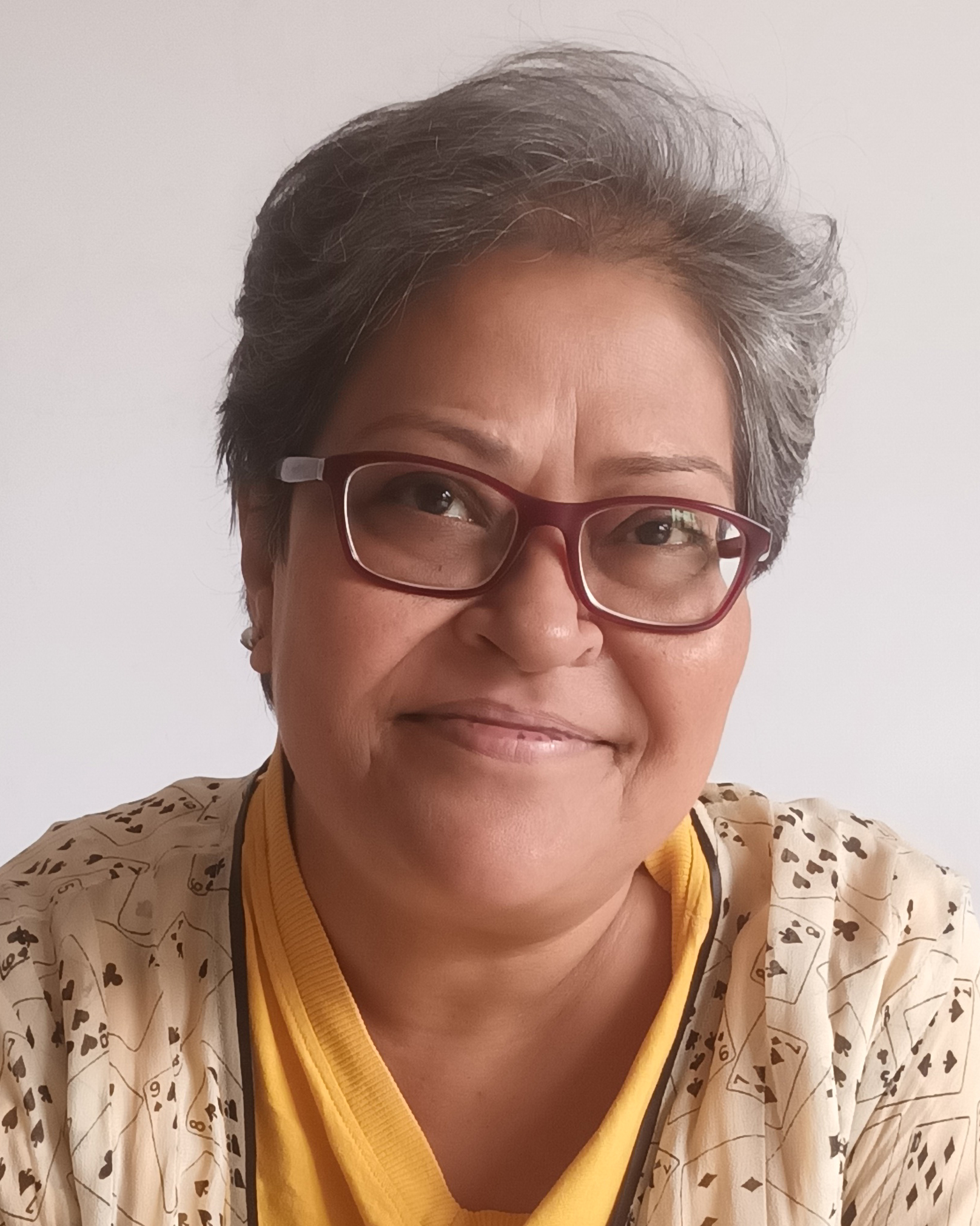
- Occupation: Actress

Sudipa Basu is an Indian actress in Bengali language film and television.

== Filmography ==
- Trishna (2009)
- Madly Bangalee (2009)
- Notobor Notout (2010)
- Hing Ting Chhat (2010)
- Punorutthan (2011)
- Raja Gaja No Problem (2011)
- Faande Poriya Boga Kaande Re (2011)
- Bye Bye Bangkok (2011)
- Abar Byomkesh (2012)
- Balukabela.com(2012)
- Golemale Pirit Koro Na (2013)
- Bakita Byaktigato(2013)
- Aranyadeb (2016)
- Mahalaya (film) (2019)
- Mitthye Premer Gaan (2023)
- Biye Bibhrat (2023)
- Bhog (2025)

== Television ==
- Ek Akasher Niche as Anita (later replaced by Indrani Basu) then again Sudipa come back in this role
- Ekdin Pratidin as Sudipa
- Phirki as Meenakshi
- Durga
- Raja & Gaja
- Shashuri Zindabad
- Tapur Tupur as Gayatree Choudhury
- Boyei Gelo as Sucharita Das
- Mon Niye Kachakachi as Mona Kaapor
- Jarowar Jhumko as Bhalo Bou
- Khelaghor as Aloka Chatterjee
- Boron
- Jibon Saathi as Konika
- Bodhisattwor Bodhbuddhi
- Jagaddhatri
- Meyebela
- Ekhane Aakash Neel (2019 TV series)
- Anurager Chhowa

== See also ==
- Chaiti Ghoshal
- Kamalika Banerjee
