= Nayika No.1 =

2023 Indian drama serial

- Genre: Drama; Comedy; Romance
- Created by: Blues Productions
- Story by: Snehashish Chakraborty; Dialogues; Snehashish Chakraborty
- Directed by: Argha Paik
- Starring: Ritobrota Dey; Indranil Chatterjee
- Country of origin: India
- Original language: Bengali
- No. of episodes: 272

Production
- Producer: Snehashish Chakraborty
- Production location: Kolkata
- Camera setup: Multi-camera
- Running time: 20 minutes
- Production company: Blues Productions

Original release
- Network: Colors Bangla
- Release: 6 March – 2 December 2023

Nayika No.1 is a 2023 Indian Bengali Drama television series that released on 6 March 2023 on Colors Bangla. The series is produced under the banner of Blues Productions. It stars Ritobrota Dey and Indranil Chatterjee in lead roles.

== Plot ==
The series follows Sheetala Sikder, a junior artist working in the Bengali entertainment industry who dreams of becoming a leading actress. Preferring to be known as Sheela, she pursues her ambition despite the difficulties and uncertainty associated with establishing herself in the entertainment industry.

== Cast ==
=== Main ===
- Ritobrota Dey as Sheetala Sikder a.k.a. Shila
- Indranil Chatterjee as Suddho Sen

=== Recurring ===
- Chandni Saha as Pratikka
- Indrakshi Dey as Shinjini Roy
- Somasree Chaki as Shila's mother
- Asim Mukhopadhyay as Shila's father
- Debarati Paul as Shila's sister
- Supriyo Dutta as Bijoy Sen: Suddho's father
- Sutapa Banerjee as Suddho's mother
- Rajib Banerjee as Suddho's uncle
- Judhajit Banerjee as Suddho's uncle
- Reshmi Bhattacharya as Suddho's aunt
- Arpita Dutta Chowdhury as Suddho's aunt
- Soma Dey as Labhonyo Prova Sen
- Roshni Ghosh as Tithir
- Shobhana Bhunia as Pallabi
- Payel Sarkar as Sneha
- Nandini Roy as Purba
- Debolina Dutta as Vidhyamoni
- Debjoy Mallick as Monti sen
- Mohua Halder as Ranjita
- Shubo Yash as Vijay
- Oshni Das as Monica Sen
- Joy Badlani as Film director
- Sourav Banerjee as Gajendra
- Brinda Mukherjee as Chaya
- Srabanti Mukherjee as Junior artist.
- Malobika Sen as Malobika Sen
- Meghna Halder as Megh Chowdhury
- Maadhurima Chakraborty as Diksha
- Sreetama Baidya as Sreetama
