= Geet Dholi =

Indian Punjabi television series

- Genre: Drama
- Directed by: Yash Singh Kaushik
- Starring: See below
- Country of origin: India
- Original language: Punjabi
- No. of episodes: 635

Production
- Producers: Suman Goel; Shalendra Goel
- Cinematography: Purshottam Kumar Dass
- Editors: Pushpendra Singh; Rajesh Rawat
- Camera setup: Multi-camera
- Running time: 22 minutes
- Production company: Shally Suman Production

Original release
- Network: Zee Punjabi
- Release: 30 August 2021 – 2 February 2024

Related
- Jamuna Dhaki

Geet Dholi is an Indian Punjabi language Drama television series premiered from 30 August 2021 which aired on Zee Punjabi. It is produced by Suman Goel and Shalendra Goel of Shally Suman Production and stars Gurpreet Kaur and Anmol Gupta. It is an official remake of Bengali TV series Jamuna Dhaki.

== Plot ==
This show narrates the story of a girl, Geet, who plays the dhol following her dad's legacy and make it evident that music has got nothing to do with the gender. Her husband is Malhar who helps her in achieving her dreams.

== Cast ==
=== Main ===
- Gurpreet Kaur as Geet, a dholi and Malhar's wife
- Anmol Gupta as Malhar, Geet's husband

=== Recurring ===
- Ajay Prinja as Avtar Krishan
- Pawan Kumar Dhiman as Diamond Mehra, Malhar's uncle
- Tania Mahajan as Ginni
- Racchpal Singh as Surjeet, Geet's father
- Gagandeep Kaur as Jasleen, JK's wife
- Dalbir Singh as JK Mehra, Jasleen's husband
- Manjinder Kaur as Kammo
- Krishna Saini as Lahouran, JK's stepmother
- Gurpreet Singh as Rocky
- Navjinder Kaur as Simone Chaddha
- Vanshika Sharma as Pearl Mehra
- Sahil Vij as Somnath, Competition owner
- Sumesh Awasthi as Jagmohan Bajaj, Akash's father
- Renu Kamboj as Nimrat, Akash's Mother
- Vipan Dhawan as Sukhwant Bajaj, Akash's Tayaji

== Adaptations ==
Language	Title	Original Release	Network(s)	Last aired	Notes
Bengali	Jamuna Dhaki যমুনা ঢাকি	13 July 2020	Zee Bangla	1 July 2022	Original
Punjabi	Geet Dholi ਗੀਤ ਢੋਲੀ	30 August 2021	Zee Punjabi	2 February 2024	Remake
Marathi	Daar Ughad Baye दार उघड बये	19 September 2022	Zee Marathi	7 October 2023	Remake
