= Jagadhatri =

2023 Indian Telugu language TV series

- Genre: Drama
- Developed by: Snehasish Chakraborty; Blues Productions
- Story by: Snehasish Chakraborty
- Starring: See below
- Country of origin: India
- Original language: Telugu
- No. of episodes: 962

Production
- Production locations: Hyderabad, Telangana
- Camera setup: Multi-camera

Original release
- Network: Zee Telugu
- Release: 21 August 2023 – present

Related
- Jagaddhatri

Jagadhatri is an Indian Telugu language TV series airing on Zee Telugu which premiered from 21 August 2023. The show is an official remake of Bengali TV series Jagaddhatri. It stars Deepthi Manne and Darsh Chandrappa in lead roles.

== Plot ==
Jagadhatri is a secret service officer, but pretends to be timid with her family. She teams up with Kedar to prove her mother's innocence and Kedar's identity in his family.

== Cast ==
=== Main ===
- Deepthi Manne as Jagadhatri (JD)
- Darsh Chandrappa as Kedar (KD)

=== Recurring ===
- Preethi Srinivas as Koushiki
- Suhan Ghori as Yuvaraj
- Neelima as Nishika
- Raga Madhuri as Vyjayanthi
- Ram Mohan as Sudhakar
- Girish as Kamalakar
- Vikram Sheriff as Meenan
- Rajendra as Sadhu
- Abhigna / Jhansi Rathod / Vani Reddy as Kaachi
- Rakesh as Boochika
- Jasmika as Keerthi
- Devaraj Reddy as Suresh
- Sunitha as Ramya
- Deva as Kiran
- Aleka Reddy as Srivalli
- Gayathri / Chandana Vikatakavi as Madhuri
- Spoorthi Gowda as Divyanka
- Shanthi Reddy as Ragini
- Balaji / Ratan Hari as Bharathwaja
- Lireesha as Rekha
- Lakshmi Shetty as Siri
- Jaya Naidu as Aadilakshmi
- Jaya as Dharani
- Dubbing Janaki as Subhadra
- Rajakumari as Janaki
- Nagireddy as Dubai Babu
- BHEL Prasad as Parandhamaiah and Balraju
- Rohini Reddy as Dhanalakshmi a.k.a Dragon
- Kasthuri Shankar as Sharmila Tagore

== Adaptations ==
Language	Title	Original release	Network(s)	Last aired	Notes
Bengali	Jagaddhatri জগদ্ধাত্রী	29 August 2022	Zee Bangla	14 December 2025	Original
Telugu	Jagadhatri జగద్ధాత్రి	21 August 2023	Zee Telugu	Ongoing	Remake
Punjabi	Sehajveer ਸਹਿਜਵੀਰ	25 March 2024	Zee Punjabi	31 May 2025	Remake
Tamil	Ayali அயலி	2 June 2025	Zee Tamil	Ongoing	Remake
Marathi	Taarini तारिणी	11 August 2025	Zee Marathi	Ongoing	Remake
Hindi	Jagadhatri जगद्धात्री	10 November 2025	Zee TV	27 November 2026	Remake
Malayalam	Durga ദുർഗ്ഗ	17 November 2025	Zee Keralam	Ongoing	Remake
Kannada	Jagaddhatri ಜಗದ್ಧಾತ್ರಿ	28 September 2026	Zee Kannada	Ongoing	Remake
