= Jagadhatri (TV series) =

Indian Hindi crime thriller series

- Genre: Drama; Romance; Thriller; Social issue
- Created by: Rahul Kumar Tewary
- Developed by: Snehasish Chakraborty; Blues Productions
- Directed by: Atif Khan; Ajay Kumar; Maanish Singh
- Creative director: Abhishek Sarkar
- Starring: Sonakshi Batra; Farman Haider
- Opening theme: "Har Janam" by Sutirtha Chakraborty; Lyrics: Shloke Lal
- Composer: Shloke Lal
- Country of origin: India
- Original language: Hindi
- No. of episodes: 361

Production
- Producer: Rahul Kumar Tewary
- Cinematography: Nidhin Valanday
- Editors: Rakesh Lal Das; Ajay Saroj Singh
- Camera setup: Multi-camera
- Running time: 22 minutes
- Production company: Rolling Tales Production

Original release
- Network: Zee TV
- Release: 10 November 2025 – 27 November 2026

Related
- Jagaddhatri

Jagadhatri is an Indian Hindi-language action thriller romantic drama television series that premiered on 10 November 2025 on Zee TV and streams digitally on ZEE5. Produced by Rahul Kumar Tewary under Rolling Tales Production, the series stars Sonakshi Batra and Farman Haider. It is an official remake of Zee Bangla's Bengali series Jagaddhatri.

== Plot ==
The narrative follows Jagadhatri "JD" Naik Deshmukh, a seemingly timid and submissive young woman within her family but a brave and highly skilled undercover agent outside her home. While navigating everyday taunts and mistreatment from her step-mother and relatives, she balances family obligations with her secret mission to fight crime and uncover the truth behind her deceased mother's mysterious past. Her loyal partner and confidant in this journey is Shivaay Deshmukh, an raw undercover SPF officer who supports her in dangerous missions.

== Cast ==
=== Main ===
- Sonakshi Batra as Jagadhatri "JD" Naik Deshmukh: Undercover SPF officer; Aparna and Jagdish's daughter; Rekha's step-daughter; Tapasya and Anjali's half sister; Shivaay's wife (2025–present)
  - Aaradhya Patel as child Jagadhatri (2025; 2026) (flashback appearance)
- Farman Haider as Shivaay Singh Deshmukh: Undercover SPF officer; Mahesh and Urmila's son; Aarti's step-son; Rudra and Aarna's half-brother; Jagadhatri's husband (2025–present)
  - Saarth Kumar as child Shivaay (2026) (flashback appearance)

=== Recurring ===
- Sayantani Ghosh as Maya Deshmukh: Mahendra and Uma's daughter; Sharad's estranged wife; Gunjan's mother (2025–present)
- Ajay Chaudhary as Sharad Joshi: Maya's estranged husband; Gunjan's father (2025–present)
- Imran Khan as Mahesh Deshmukh: Jagan's brother; Urmila's widower; Aarti's husband; Shivaay, Rudra and Aarna's father (2025–present)
- Vishavpreet Kaur as Aarti Deshmukh: Digvijay's younger sister; Mahesh's second wife; Rudra and Aarna's mother; Shivaay's stepmother (2025–present)
- Ayush Shrivastava as Rudra Deshmukh: Mahesh and Aarti's son; Aarna's brother; Shivaay's half-brother; Tapasya's husband (2025–present)
- Yesha Harsora as Tapasya Naik Deshmukh: Rekha and Jagdish's elder daughter; Anjali's sister; Jagadhatri's half-sister; Rudra's wife (2025–present)
- Vaishnavi Ganatra as Aarna Deshmukh: Mahesh and Aarti's daughter; Rudra's sister; Shivaay's half-sister (2025–present)
- Pari Bhanushali / Dhanisha Bhavsar as Gunjan Joshi: Maya and Sharad's daughter (2025–2026) / (2026–present)
- Smita Sinkar Shah as Uma Deshmukh: Matriarch of Deshmukh family; Mahendra's widow; Maya's mother; Gunjan's grandmother (2025–present)
- Jaineeraj Rajpurohit as Jagan Deshmukh: Mahesh's brother; Pallavi's husband; Sonali's father (2025–present)
- Shweta Kataria as Pallavi Deshmukh: Jagan's wife; Sonali's mother (2025–present)
- Mansi Jain as Sonali "Sona" Deshmukh: Jagan and Pallavi's daughter (2025–present)
- Anuja Sathe as Head Constable Aparna Naik: Jagdish's late wife; Jagadhatri's mother (2025; 2026) (flashback appearance)
- Suhita Thatte as Sulakshana Naik: The Matriarch of the Naik family; Jagdish and Sampada's mother; Jagadhatri, Aarav, Tapasya and Anjali's grandmother (2025–present)
- Geeta Tyagi as Rekha Naik: Jagdish's second wife; Tapasya and Anjali's mother; Jagadhatri's step-mother (2025–present)
- Jiten Lalwani as Jagdish Naik: Sulakshana's son; Sampada's brother; Aparna's widower; Rekha's husband; Jagadhatri, Tapasya and Anjali's father (2025–present)
- Saloni Rathi as Anjali Naik: Rekha and Jagdish's younger daughter; Tapasya's sister; Jagadhatri's half-sister (2025–present)
- Neetu Pandey as Sampada Naik: Sulakshana's daughter; Jagdish's sister; Milind's widow; Aarav's mother (2025–present)
- Amit Soni as Milind: A journalist; Sampada's husband; Aarav's father (2026) (flashback appearance)
- Raghav Dhir as Aarav: Sampada and Milind's son (2025–present)
- Shikha Singh as Sakshi Mittal: Maya's rival (2025–present)
- Ashok Lokhande as Agent Sadhu Yadav: Chief of the Special Police Force; mentor for Jagadhatri's team (2025–2026)
- Hritika Singh Kanwar as Agent Aditi Roy: Forensic expert of Jagadhatri's team (2025–present)
- Trishikha Tripathi as Agent Anusha: Tech operator of Jagadhatri's team (2025–present)
- Azad Ansari as Agent Rishab: Undercover agent of Jagadhatri's team (2025–present)
- Brownie Parashar as Moosa: Underworld criminal; Aparna and Milind's murderer; Rudra's crime partner (2025–2026)
- Mona Vasu as ACP Geeta Ahlawat: Jagadhatri and Shivaay's senior (2026–present)
- Himanshu Soni as ACP Shaurya Rathee: Jagadhatri and Shivaay's senior (2026–present)
- Mishmee Das as SSP Jahnvee Ganguly: New Chief of Special Police Force; Jagadhatri and Shivaay's senior (2026–present)
- Kanan Malhotra as Minister Aarav Patil (2026–present)
- Charudutt Sapra as Agent Yash: Undercover agent of Jagadhatri's team who was secretly working as a mole for Moosa (2025–2026)
- Ajay Jayram as Agent Bhurelal: Undercover agent in Jagadhatri's team (2025–present)
- Hitanshu Jinsi as Amey: Sonali's husband (2025)
- Vinit Kakar as Vineet: Gangster working for Moosa (2025)
- Kamaal Malik as Police commissioner (2025–present)
- Hitul Pujara as Gaurav Mehta: Aarna's former classmate who tried to molest her on the orders of a criminal who tried to molest her earlier and later got killed by the criminal accusing her for the same (2026) (Dead)
- Riya Gupta as Lisa: Rudra's accompolice (2026–present)
- Nimai Bali as Digvijay Gokhale: Aarti's elder brother (2026–present)

==== Guest appearances ====
- Priya Thakur as Vasudha "Vasu" Singh Chauhan from Vasudha (2025)

== Production ==
=== Development ===
In September 2025, Zee TV announced a new series titled Jagadhatri, Sonakshi Batra and Farman Haider as the main lead.

=== Casting ===
Sonakshi Batra was confirmed to play female lead, Jagadhatri. Farman Haider was selected to portray the male lead, Shivay. Geeta Tyagi joined the show as Rekha. Sayantani Ghosh was cast as Maya. Esteemed actor Suhita Tatte joined the cast as Aaji, Jagadhatri's grandmother. Smita Sinkar also joined the show as Uma, matriarch of Deshmukh family. In July 2026, Mishmee Das joined the show to essay SSP Jahnvee, Jagadhatri's classmate. In August, Kanan Malhotra joined the cast to essay Minister Aarav Patil. In September 2026, Mona Vasu joined the show as ACP Geetha Ahlawat. Himanshu Soni was cast in a cameo as Inspector Shaurya Rathi. In November 2026, Nimai Bali joined the show as Digvijay Gokhale, Aarti's brother.

=== Music ===
The series features the romantic track "Har Janam", picturised on JD and Shivaay to highlight their developing relationship.

=== Filming ===
The undercover duality agent drama features multiple action sequences including risky Holi fire scene with child actor Bhanushali and Batra overcoming the fear of heights.

== Reception ==
Throughout June 2026, the show maintained a steady rating of 1.4 TVR, making its way to top ten shows.

Ahead of the wedding of protagonists Shivaay and Jagadhatri, Fans hosted traditional Kelvan for lead actress Sonakshi Batra. The wedding was styled in a Maharashtrian culture.

== Adaptations ==
Language	Title	Original release	Network(s)	Last aired	Notes
Bengali	Jagaddhatri জগদ্ধাত্রী	29 August 2022	Zee Bangla	14 December 2025	Original
Telugu	Jagadhatri జగద్ధాత్రి	21 August 2023	Zee Telugu	Ongoing	Remake
Punjabi	Sehajveer ਸਹਿਜਵੀਰ	25 March 2024	Zee Punjabi	31 May 2025	Remake
Tamil	Ayali அயலி	2 June 2025	Zee Tamil	Ongoing	Remake
Marathi	Taarini तारिणी	11 August 2025	Zee Marathi	Ongoing	Remake
Hindi	Jagadhatri जगद्धात्री	10 November 2025	Zee TV	27 November 2026	Remake
Malayalam	Durga ദുർഗ്ഗ	17 November 2025	Zee Keralam	Ongoing	Remake
Kannada	Jagaddhatri ಜಗದ್ಧಾತ್ರಿ	28 September 2026	Zee Kannada	Ongoing	Remake

== Awards and nominations ==
Year	Award	Category	Recipient	Result	Ref.
2026	Indian Television Academy Awards	Best Supporting Actress - Drama - TV	Sayantani Ghosh	Pending	
2026	Indian Television Academy Awards	Best Negative Performance - TV	Ayush Shrivastava	Pending	
2026	Indian Television Academy Awards	Best Art Director - TV	Anprosh Jadav	Pending	
2026	Indian Television Academy Awards	Best Costume Designer - TV	Tripti Arora	Pending	
