= Advocate Anjali Awasthi =

2024 Indian television series

- Genre: Courtroom; Romance; Social issue
- Developed by: Blues Productions
- Written by: Snehasish Chakraborty; Dialogues and Lyrics; Sanjeev Tiwari
- Screenplay by: Snehasish Chakraborty
- Story by: Snehasish Chakraborty
- Directed by: Rupam Baag
- Creative director: Snehasish Chakraborty
- Starring: Shritama Mitra; Ankit Raizada; Puneett Chouksey
- Theme music composer: Snehasish Chakraborty
- Country of origin: India
- Original language: Hindi
- No. of episodes: 655

Production
- Executive producer: Runa Dey Sarkar
- Producer: Snehasish Chakraborty
- Production location: Kolkata
- Cinematography: Debabrata Mallick
- Editor: Bapan Pramanik
- Running time: 20–22 minutes
- Production company: Blues Productions

Original release
- Network: StarPlus
- Release: 8 August 2024 – 31 May 2026

Advocate Anjali Awasthi is an Indian Hindi lnguage romance and courtroom drama television series that premiered on 8 August 2024 on StarPlus. Produced under Blues Productions, the series starred Shritama Mitra as Anjali and Ankit Raizada as Aman in the main roles. It is the remake of Star Jalsha's Bengali series Geeta LL.B. In June 2025, the show took 20-year leap and was rebranded as Aarti Anjali Awasthi, centering on Aman and Anjali's daughter, Aarti, also portrayed by Shritama Mitra and Ved Rajyavanshi played Puneett Chouksey. The show went off air on 31 May 2026.

== Plot ==
A legal drama that chronicles the journey of a brave and determined lawyer, named Anjali Awasthi, who struggling to make a name for herself in the male-dominated field. She chances upon her first case, which is against the "big guns". This case becomes the ultimate test of Anjali's resolve, not only to establish herself in the legal field, but also to challenge deep-rooted inequities.

Aman and Anjali's daughter, Aarti has grown up to become a brave and resolute reporter, dedicated to seeking justice and standing her ground, much like her mother did before her. But Sapna is uneasy about Aarti's choice of career, fearing that her granddaughter might suffer the same tragic fate as Anjali, who has been in a catatonic state for 21 years.

Aarti's maternal grandparents, Ganesh and Sapna have secretly raised her in their colony, carefully ensuring that no one outside its borders knew of her existence. Their aim was to protect her from Chandrabhan Thakur and his son, Yuvraj, who had once plotted to kill Aarti as revenge against Anjali for all the past humiliations.

Chandrabhan and Yuvraj believed that Aarti had died in the accident they had orchestrated, the same incident that left Anjali catatonic and claimed the life of her husband, Aman.

What Ganesh and Sapna never knew was that both Chandrabhan and Yuvraj were involved in the tragedy. On the day of the accident, Ganesh had overheard Yuvraj speaking on the phone with his father, Chandrabhan, well plotting to kill Aarti. But he could not clearly recognize who's voice it was.

Driven by a strong sense of justice, Aarti is determined to uncover the truth behind her father, Aman's death and her mother, Anjali's condition. But she remains unaware of her father's identity and paternal lineage, as neither her grandparents, Ganesh and Sapna, nor the former maid of the Rajput family, Padman had ever revealed this to her.

The secrecy stems from the Rajput family itself. Except for Aarti's aunts, Mehek and Saniya, her great-aunt, Nivedita and her great-uncle, Gaurav, they had severed all ties with the Awasthi family. They had blamed Anjali for Aman's death and had rejected Aarti solely because she is Anjali's daughter, completely disregarding the fact that she was also Aman's daughter. But in truth, Anjali is not responsible for Aman's demise at all, he had simply been in the wrong place at the wrong time.

This bitterness is fueled by the way Raghav and the Rajput family, excluding Gaurav, Mehek, Nivedita, and Saniya, have mistreated Ganesh, Sapna and Anjali. Wrongfully blaming Anjali for Aman's death, they had turned their backs on her and had rejected Aarti altogether.

Aarti begins to investigate the recent human trafficking incidents, in order to gather evidence that could help send the masterminds to prison, during her investigation, she saves a woman, named Kali from the traffickers and takes her to the Awasthi home for safety. Later, Aarti encounters Ved Rajavanshi and they both develop romantic feelings towards each other.

Meanwhile, Anjali begins to slowly recover from her catatonic state, gradually regaining the ability to move, walk and speak once again.

One day, Kavya sees Aarti and mistakes her for Anjali. Terrified, she realizes that if Anjali has truly recovered, she could gather solid evidence against her brother, Yuvraj and send him to prison. Anjali had witnessed Yuvraj driving the truck just moments before it crashed into the car carrying her and Aman, an accident that left her incapacitated and ultimately caused Aman's death. Yuvraj's impulsive and reckless nature, often leaving behind incriminating clues, makes this possibility all the more dangerous for him.

Anjali might also uncover the truth about Kavya's father, Chandrabhan, who was an accomplice in the same incident. If exposed, this could lead to his imprisonment as well, since both Yuvraj and Chandrabhan remain her only known enemies with clear motives to harm her, especially after their failed attempt to kill her daughter, Aarti.

When Kavya informs her father, Chandrabhan that Anjali has awakened from her catatonic state, Chandrabhan grows anxious and decides to see for himself. Visiting her home, he stabs her in the leg, only to find her unresponsive. Convinced that Kavya was imagining things, he leaves, unaware that the person that Kavya had actually seen was not Anjali at all, but her daughter, Aarti.

== Cast ==
=== Main ===
- Shritama Mitra as
  - Advocate Anjali Awasthi Singh Rajput: An aggressive, honest and strong-willed lawyer; Ganesh and Sapna's younger daughter (2024–2026)
  - Aarti Singh Rajput Rajvanshi: An aggressive, honest and weak-willed reporter; Anjali and Aman's daughter (2025–2026)
- Ankit Raizada / Harpreet Singh as Advocate Aman Singh Rajput: An honest and strong-willed lawyer; Raghav and Nandini's younger son (2024–2025) / (2026)
- Puneett Chouksey as Ved Rajvanshi: A remorseful and former unwilling human trafficker; Hina and Pratap's son (2025–2026)

=== Awasthis ===
- Ashim Mukhopadhyay as Advocate Ganesh Awasthi: An honest and weak-willed lawyer; Sapna's husband (2024–2026)
- Shoma Akarshan as Sapna Awasthi: Ganesh's wife (2024–2025)

=== Singh Rajputs ===
- Umesh Ghadge as Advocate Raghav Singh Rajput: A dishonest lawyer; Vaibhav and Gaurav's brother (2024–2026)
- Ishrat Khan as Nandini Singh Rajput: Raghav's wife (2024–2025)
- Vicky Singh Kashyap as Abhay Singh Rajput: Raghav and Nandini's elder son (2024–2026)
- Priya Rore as Gini Awasthi Singh Rajput/Rani Mojumdar: Ganesh and Sapna's elder daughter (2024–2026)
- Arsh Merchant as Vaibhav Singh Rajput: Raghav and Gaurav's brother (2024–2026)
- Shampa Banerjee as Sadika Singh Rajput: Vaibhav's wife (2024–2026)
- Koushiki Basu as Ishani Singh Rajput: Sadika and Vaibhav's elder daughter (2024–2025)
- Srijita Chakraborty as Avni Singh Rajput: Sadika and Vaibhav's younger daughter (2024–2025)
- Bhaswar Chatterjee as Gaurav Singh Rajput: Raghav and Vaibhav's estranged brother (2024–2026)
- Meghna Halder as Nivedita Singh Rajput: Gaurav's wife (2024–2026)
- Rupsha Chatterjee as Saniya Singh Rajput Singh: Gaurav and Nivedita's daughter (2024–2026)

=== Thakurs ===
- Bharat Kaul as Chandrabhan Thakur: A corrupt former politician turned human trafficker; Rati's husband (2024–2026)
- Tapasya Dasgupta as Rati Thakur: Chandrabhan's wife (2024–2026)
- Anshul Bammi as Yuvraj Thakur: A criminal; Chandrabhan and Rati's son (2024–2026)
- Nagina Bopche as Mehek Singh Rajput Thakur: Raghav and Nandini's daughter (2024–2026)
- Indrakshi Dey as Kavya Thakur: Chandrabhan and Rati's daughter (2024–2026)

=== Rajvanshis ===
- Ajay Dutta as Uday Rajvanshi: A corrupt businessman and former human trafficker; Pratap's brother (2025–2026)
- Manoj Kaushik as Pratap Rajvanshi: A corrupt businessman and former human trafficker; Uday's brother (2025–2026)
- Sonnal Mishra as Sonal Rajvanshi: Hina and Pratap's daughter (2025–2026)

=== Others ===
- Yukta Upadhyay/Kashika Sisodia as Padma Rajak: The Rajput family's former maid; Yuvraj's ex wife and enemy; Anjali, Aman and Aarti's well wisher (2024–2025)/(2025–2026)
- Vikkas Pareeck as ACP Pankaj Purohit: An honest and strong-willed police inspector; Anjali's friend and well wisher; Vidyut's former superior officer and enemy (2024–2026)
- Aman Mishra as Advocate Bhajan Singh: A dishonest lawyer; Saniya's husband; Anjali's enemy (2024–2026)
- Shailesh Lodha as Advocate Ramesh Patel: An honest lawyer; Raghav's former friend; Anjali and Aman's well wisher (2024; 2026)
- Aniruddh Roy as Prakash Tripathy: Deepika's former partner; Anjali's enemy (2025; 2026)
- Mahananda Kar as Deepika Sharma: Prakash's former partner; Anjali's enemy turned well wisher (2025; 2026)
- Sujan Mukherjee as Damodar Majumdar: A crime lord; Gini's ex husband; Anjali's enemy (2025–2026)
- Simran Singh as Kali: Aarti's well-wisher turned enemy; Ved's obsessive love interest and fake wife (2025–2026)
- Srijon Gupta as Vidyut Kashyap: An dishonest former police inspector; Pankaj's former officer and enemy (2025–2026)
- Abhishek Singh as Dharamraj Ahuja: A corrupt politician; Anjali's enemy (2026)
- Sakshi Parihar as Sakshi Chaudhary: Aman's well wisher (2026)

==== Guest appearances ====
- Kanwar Dhillon as Sachin Deshmukh from Udne Ki Aasha (2025)
- Shambhavi Singh as Shalini Dixit Deshmukh from Mr. and Mrs. Parshuram in Action Ka Blockbuster (2026)

== Reception ==
In Week 32, the show was included among the top five in the TRP charts. A week later, it dropped to sixthplace with a 2.1 rating. By Week 48, it regained the fourth position and continued to remain among the top five shows.
