= Sudur Niharika =

- VCD cover of the film
- Directed by: Sushil Mukherjee
- Screenplay by: Shyamal Gupta
- Produced by: Anjana Bhattacharya
- Starring: Soumitra Chatterjee; Soma Dey; Sumitra Mukherjee; Dipti Roy; Bikash Roy; Debashree Roy; Rabi Ghosh; Arindam Ganguly
- Music by: Manabendra Mukherjee
- Release date: 6 February 1976
- Country: India
- Language: Bengali
- Box office: Hit

Sudur Niharika is a 1976 Indian Bengali language film directed by Sushil Mukherjee and produced by Anjana Bhattacharya. It stars Soumitra Chatterjee, Soma Dey, Sumitra Mukherjee, Dipti Roy Bikash Roy, Debashree Roy, Rabi Ghosh and Arindam Ganguly. Music of the film was composed by Manabendra Mukherjee with lyrics penned by Shyamal Gupta.

== Cast ==
- Soumitra Chatterjee
- Soma Dey
- Sumitra Mukherjee
- Dipti Roy
- Bikash Roy
- Debashree Roy
- Rabi Ghosh
- Arindam Ganguly

== Soundtrack ==
All songs are composed by Manabendra Mukhopadhyay and written by Shyamal Gupta.

- "Kar Manjir Jhankar" - Manabendra Mukhopadhyay
- "Jekhanei Tumi Thako" - Aarti Mukherjee
- "Torir Naam Jiban Tori" - Hemanta Mukherjee
- "Ahata Pakhi" - Sandhya Mukhopadhyay
- "Jiban Maraner Sathi" - Manna Dey, Aarti Mukherjee
- "Aaj Ei Raat Jalsar Raat" - Sandhya Mukhopadhyay
- "Hokka Karanga Karanga" - Manabendra Mukhopadhyay, Nirmala Mishra, chorus
