= Jibon Saathi =

Indian Bengali television series

- Genre: Drama; Romance
- Created by: Blues Productions
- Developed by: Blues Productions
- Screenplay by: Snehasish Chakraborty
- Story by: Snehasish Chakraborty
- Directed by: Sukamal Nath; Rajat Pal
- Starring: Shrabani Bhunia; Diya Basu; Sayan Karmakar; Rudrajit Mukherjee; Indrani Dutta
- Voices of: Trisha
- Opening theme: "Jibon saathi"
- Composer: Snehasish Chakraborty
- Country of origin: India
- Original language: Bengali
- No. of episodes: 409

Production
- Executive producers: Runa & Sudip (Blues Productions); Suparno Saha (Zee Bangla)
- Producer: Snehasish Chakraborty
- Cinematography: Kartik Das
- Editors: Bapon Pramanik; Somnath Khara
- Camera setup: Multi-camera
- Running time: 22 minutes
- Production company: Blues Productions

Original release
- Network: Zee Bangla
- Release: 5 October 2020 – 4 March 2022

Jibon Saathi is an Indian Bengali Language Romantic Drama Thriller television series which premiered on 5 October 2020 on the Bengali General Entertainment Channel Zee Bangla. The show was produced by Snehasish Chakraborty's Blues Productions and starred Diya Basu, Sayan Karmakar, Shrabani Bunia, Rudrajit Mukherjee, and Indrani Dutta in lead roles.

== Plot ==
Priyam is married off to a man named Sankalpo, who was previously in love with her elder sister, Jhelum. She struggles to win him over while also pursuing her professional goals. As fate would have it, Priyam has to marry Sankalpo, the son of Salankara, a successful businesswoman in the fashion industry, because of her father's wishes. However, Sankalpo has eyes only for Jhelum, who, in turn, gets married off to Turno, a man from a much humbler background.

Priyam is determined to win over her husband despite all odds. She has a warm and charming personality and a heart of gold. However, just as she makes a breakthrough in her relationship with Sankalpo, Jhelum's husband passes away, and she comes to live with Priyam and Sankalpo.

== Cast ==
=== Main ===
- Shrabani Bhunia as Jhelum Ganguly (née Chatterjee): Turno's wife and Priyam's elder sister. She is a beautiful and quiet girl. She has been in love with Turno for ten years, who happens to be a medical representative and later she marries him.
- Diya Basu as Priyam Banerjee (née Chatterjee): Sankalpo's wife, Jhelum's sister and Salankara Devi's daughter-in-law. She is a kindhearted and cheerful girl. She does not attract a lot of attention because of her looks. Priyam is also artistic and skilled at threading work and stitches.
- Sayan Karmakar as Sankalpo Banerjee: Priyam's husband, Shalankara Devi's son, and Jhelum's former fiancée. He has no interest in his mother's vast saree business. He is an honest police officer. He falls in love with Jhelum, but he marries Priyam without interest.
- Rudrajit Mukherjee as Turno Ganguly: Jhelum's husband, a medical representative by profession. He is calm and composed. Initially he had to face a lot for not being so successful in his life and he used to keep a low profile. But he gets shot by Sankalpo, and everyone believes he has died, but he survives. He has completely changed, from his look, body language, voice, everything. The shoot out incident changed his life.
- Indrani Dutta as Shalankara Banarjee: Bivash's wife, Sankalpo and Sanchita's mother and Priyam's mother-in-law. She is owner of a massive saree enterprises. She was obsessed with anything that she found beautiful, and absolutely hated anything that was not, she loathed Priyam for being outspoken and not excessively pretty. However, she later comes to realise her mistake.

=== Recurring ===
- Dipankar De as Molinath Banerjee aka Deda: Bivash, Subhash, Mita, Oishani and Koushani's father
- Biplab Banerjee as Bivash Banerjee: Molinath's son, Shalankara's husband, Sankalpo and Sanchita's father, Priyam's father-in-law.
- Raja Chatterjee as Subhash Banerjee: Molinath's son, Arshi's husband, Doyel's father, Sankalpo and Sanchita's uncle.
- Mallika Banerjee as Arshi Banerjee: Subhash's wife, Doyel's mother, Sankalpo and Sanchita's aunt.
- Rumpa Das as Doyel Banerjee: Subhash and Arshi's daughter, Sankalpo and Sanchita's cousin sister.
- Lekha Chatterjee as Sanchita Banerjee: Shalankara and Bivash's daughter, Sankalpo's younger sister.
- Rupsha Chakraborty as Oishani Banerjee: Molinath's daughter, Rick's wife.
- Neel Mukherjee as Rick Sen: Oishani and Koushani's husband.
- Meghna Haldar as Koushani Banerjee / Kashmira Singh: Molinath's daughter, Oishani's twin sister, Rick's second wife.
- Meghna Mukherjee as Meghna: Durba's daughter, Sankalpo and Sanchita's cousin sister.
- Swarnakamal Dutta as Mita Mukherjee: Molinath's daughter, Kush's wife.
- Judhajit Banerjee as Kush Mukherjee: Mita's husband.
- Dolon Roy as Durba: Meghna's mother, Sankalpo and Sanchita's aunt.
- Puja Ganguly as Riddima Sen: Rick's sister.
- Taniya Paul as Tinni: Rick's cousin sister
- Biswanath Basu as Bipin Sadhukhan: Shalankara's broker.
- Suparna Patra as Suparna Biswas: Subhash's second wife and Employee of saree business.
- Supriyo Dutta as Raghab Chatterjee: a retired police Officer, Priyam, Jhelum, Nilum and Sanju's father. Sankalpo and Turno's father-in-law.
- Uma Bardhan as Uma Chatterjee: Priyam, Jhelum, Nilum and Sanju's mother. Sankalpo and Turno's mother-in-law.
- Sudip Sengupta as Sanju Chatterjee: Raghab and Uma's son, Priyam, Jhelum and Nilum's brother
- Arpita Dutta Chowdhury as Shima: Uma's sister, Priyam, Jhelum, Nilum and Sanju's aunt.
- Jayanta Dutta Barman as Turno's Brother.
- Sayantani Majumdar as Turno's Sister-in-law.
- Arijita Mukhopadhyay as Champa: Saree laborer of Kamalpur
- Madhurima Chakraborty as Sunidhi Basu / Nidhi: Sankalpo's fiancée.
- Joy Badlani as Joy Bandari: Sunidhi's business partner, Subhash's former friend.
- Arghya Mukherjee as Don: Priyam's Advertising Director
- Ayeashrya Chatterjee as Baibhabi: Turno's fake wife, Sunidhi's cousin sister.
- Sukanya Chatterjee as Priya Sen: Priyam's rival.
- Kushal Papai Bhowmick as Kushal: Sanchita's husband.
- Soumodip Singha Roy as Barun: movie director.
- Sudipa Basu as Kanika: Kushal's aunt.
- Nondini Roy as Nondini: Kanika's daughter, Kushal's cousin sister.

== Reception ==
Week	Year	BARC Viewership		Ref.
Week	Year	TRP	Rank	Ref.
Week 51	2020	5.0	5	
Week 14	2021	4.2	5	
