= Jamuna Dhaki =

Indian Bengali television series

- Genre: Drama
- Written by: Snehasish Chakraborty
- Directed by: Bidyut Saha
- Creative director: Snehasish Chakraborty
- Starring: Shweta Bhattacharya; Rubel Das
- Voices of: Dipanita
- Composer: Snehasish Chakraborty
- Country of origin: India
- Original language: Bengali
- No. of episodes: 675

Production
- Executive producers: Runa & Sudip; Shubhangi Ghosh & Suparno Saha
- Producer: Snehasish Chakraborty
- Production location: Kolkata
- Cinematography: Debabrata Mallick
- Editors: Bapon Pramanik; Pinaki Ghosh
- Camera setup: Multi-camera
- Running time: 22 minutes
- Production company: Blues Productions

Original release
- Network: Zee Bangla
- Release: 13 July 2020 – 1 July 2022

Jamuna Dhaki is a 2020 Indian Bengali language romantic thriller drama television series that premiered on 13 July 2020 on Zee Bangla. It is produced by Snehasish Chakraborty of Blues Productions and stars Shweta Bhattacharya and Rubel Das in the lead roles. After a successful run of almost 2 years, the show concluded on 1 July 2022.

== Plot ==
This show narrates the story of a girl, Jamuna, who goes to the Roy mansion to play the dhak on behalf of her father. Jamuna is forced to take up her father's position as a drum player. When she gets married into an aristocratic family, she struggles to maintain a balance in her personal and professional life.

== Cast ==
=== Main ===
- Shweta Bhattacharya as
  - Jamuna Roy (née Das) / Jyoti Sen (in disguise): Sangeet's wife, a professional Dhaki, Kedar and Anuradha's daughter in-law, Ganga and Shiuli's daughter, Krishna and Goja's elder sister, and goddess lakshmi of the house.
  - Jhimli Chowdhury
- Rubel Das as Sangeet Roy: Jamuna's husband, Kedar & Anuradha's son, Ganga and Shiuli's elder son in-law, Geet's brother.

=== Recurring ===
- Debjani Chattopadhyay as Anuradha Roy: Kedar's wife, Sangeet's & Geet's mother, Ved and Jamuna's mother in law, a dancer
- Kaushik Banerjee as Kedar Roy: Anuradha's husband, Sangeet's and Geet's father, Ved and Jamuna's father in law, a landlord
- Soma Dey as Bindhubasini Roy: Kedar's step mother, Kalyan, Ragini and Imon's mother
- Chandni Saha as Geet Sen (née Roy): Kedar's and Anuradha's daughter, Sangeet's sister, Ved's wife
- Raja Ghosh / Aditya Chowdhury as Ved Sen: Geet's husband
- Kanchana Moitra as Ragini: Kedar's step sister, Rajanya and Pallabi's mother
- Rana Mitra as Prashanta: Ragini's husband, Rajanya and Pallabi's father
- Indrakshi Dey as Aarja Chowdhury: Rocky's fake wife and Sangeet's obsessive lover
- Gourav Ghoshal as Rathindra Roy aka Rocky: Roy family's adoptive son, Aarja's fake husband
- Ananya Biswas as Tathoi Roy: Jamuna's competitor & an enemy of Roy family
- Biplab Banerjee as Kalyan Roy: Kedar's step brother, Mallika's husband, Shree's father, Sangeet's uncle
- Mallika Banerjee as Mallika Roy: Kalyan's wife, Shree's mother, Sangeet's aunt
- Payel Sarkar as Shree Roy: Kalyan and Mallika's daughter
- Juiee Sarkar as Rajanya: Ragini and Prashanta's daughter
- Bristi Roy as Pallabi: Ragini and Prashanta's daughter
- Indrakshi Nag as Imon: Kedar's step sister, Sanjoy's wife
- Saikat Das as Sanjoy: Imon's husband
- Kushal Chakraborty as Riddhiman Chatterjee: Anuradha's former lover and Jamuna's mentor
- Shankar Debnath as Ganga Dhaki: Jamuna's father
- Sagarika Roy as Shiuli: Jamuna's mother
- Maahi Kar as Krishna: Jamuna's sister
- Sayantan Shaan Sarkar as Laltu: Krishna's husband
- Reshmi Bhattacharya as Lagna Sen: Ved's mother
- Rajib Banerjee as Rajib Sen: Ved's father
- Arpita Dutta Chowdhury as Sharbani: Ved's aunt
- Unknown as Aarja's father
- Sonali Chatterjee as Aarja's mother
- Uma Bardhan as Aarja's aunt
- Sayantani Majumdar as Rumni: Roy family's relative
- Biswanath Basu as Pobon Dhaki: Jamuna's competitor
- Subhadra Mukherjee as Gayatri Chowdhury
- Soumodip Singha Roy as Palash Chowdhury
- Supriyo Dutta as Prashad Chowdhury: Gayatri's husband
- Roshni Ghosh as Binni Chowdhury

== Awards ==
Year	Award	Category	Character	Artist
2021	Zee Bangla Sonar Sansar Awards 2021	Priyo Nayika	Jomuna	Shweta Bhattacharya
2021	Zee Bangla Sonar Sansar Awards 2021	Priyo Bouma	Jomuna	Shweta Bhattacharya
2021	Zee Bangla Sonar Sansar Awards 2021	Priyo Bor	Songeet	Rubel Das
2021	Zee Bangla Sonar Sansar Awards 2021	Priyo Sodosoo	Bindubashini	Soma Dey
2021	Zee Bangla Sonar Sansar Awards 2021	Priyo Sashuri	Anuradha	Debjani Chatterjee
2021	Zee Bangla Sonar Sansar Awards 2021	Priyo Soshur	Kedar Roy	Kaushik Banerjee
2021	Zee Bangla Sonar Sansar Awards 2021	Priyo Baba	Ganga Dhaki	Shankar Debnath
2021	Zee Bangla Sonar Sansar Awards 2021	Priyo Nonod	Geet	Chandni Saha
2022	Zee Bangla Sonar Sansar Awards 2022	Priyo Bouma	Jomuna	Shweta Bhattacharya
2022	Zee Bangla Sonar Sansar Awards 2022	Priyo Bor	Songeet	Rubel Das
2022	Tele Academy Awards 2022	Inspirational Character	Jomuna	Shweta Bhattacharya
2022	Telly Adda Awards 2022	All Time Favourite Actress	Jomuna	Shweta Bhattacharya
2022	Telly Adda Awards 2022	Golden Bonding	Sangeet	Rubel Das

== Reception ==
=== Ratings ===
Week	Year	BARC viewership		Ref.
Week	Year	TRP	Rank	Ref.
Week 37	2020	5.3	5	
Week 38	2020	5.0	5	
Week 39	2020	5.0	3	
Week 40	2020	4.8	4	
Week 42	2020	5.2	3	
Week 43	2020	4.7	3	
Week 44	2020	5.0	4	
Week 45	2020	4.9	5	
Week 46	2020	4.7	4	
Week 48	2020	5.0	5	
Week 49	2020	4.9	4	
Week 50	2020	5.6	3	
Week 51	2020	6.1	2	
Week 52	2020	6.1	2	
Week 1	2021	5.8	3	
Week 2	2021	5.7	2	
Week 3	2021	5.5	3	
Week 4	2021	5.3	3	
Week 5	2021	5.0	1	
Week 8	2021	4.5	4	
Week 9	2021	4.7	3	
Week 10	2021	4.6	3	
Week 11	2021	5.2	2	
Week 12	2021	5.3	3	
Week 13	2021	4.9	2	
Week 14	2021	4.7	3	
Week 15	2021	4.4	4	
Week 16	2021	4.1	3	
Week 17	2021	4.4	4	
Week 18	2021	4.1	4	
Week 19	2021	5.3	4	
Week 20	2021	5.1	3	
Week 21	2021	4.2	3	

== Adaptations ==
Language	Title	Original Release	Network(s)	Last aired	Notes
Punjabi	Geet Dholi ਗੀਤ ਢੋਲੀ	30 August 2021	Zee Punjabi	2 February 2024	Remake
Marathi	Daar Ughad Baye दार उघड बये	19 September 2022	Zee Marathi	7 October 2023	Remake
