= Mr. and Mrs. Parshuram =

Indian Hindi-language action thriller TV series

- Genre: Drama; Romance; Thriller; Crime
- Created by: Snehasish Chakraborty
- Developed by: Blues Productions
- Written by: Snehasish Chakraborty
- Story by: Snehasish Chakraborty
- Directed by: Bidyut Saha; Shivsahay Sharma; Pooja Deshmukh
- Starring: Shambhavi Singh; Neil Bhatt
- Composer: Rupsnaato Chakraborty
- Country of origin: India
- Original language: Hindi
- No. of episodes: 195

Production
- Executive producer: Sudipto Roy
- Producers: Snehasish Chakraborty; Rupsha Chakraborty
- Cinematography: Debabrata Mallick; Komal Yadav
- Camera setup: Multi-camera
- Running time: 22 minutes
- Production company: Blues Productions

Original release
- Network: StarPlus
- Release: 3 February – 18 August 2026

Related
- Parashuram – Ajker Nayok

Mr. and Mrs. Parshuram is an Indian Hindi-language crime thriller romantic drama television series premiered on 3 February 2026 to 18 August 2026 on StarPlus and streams digitally on JioHotstar. It is an official Hindi remake of Star Jalsha's Bengali series Parashuram – Ajker Nayok. Produced by Snehasish Chakraborty under Blues Productions, the series stars Shambhavi Singh and Neil Bhatt.

== Plot ==
Shiv Prasad Deshmukh is a seemingly ordinary middle-class family man in Maharashtra who lives with his courageous wife Shalini, son Harshit "Chintu" and daughter Riddhi "Pihu". Shalini is revealed to be actually the younger daughter of Malhar Dixit and Deepali Dixit from the elite Dixit family, but she had cut contacts with them, eloped with Shiv and married him against their wishes. While Shalini, Shiv and their kids live happily together, the Dixit family plans to marry off Malhar's younger brother Manish Dixit's daughter, Aradhya Dixit, to Kabir Kulkarni, a rich rogue from the Kulkarni family. Though the Dixits are aware of the fact that Kabir is a criminal, they still want to go ahead with the marriage to improve business relations with Kabir's father, and Aradhya also loves him dearly. Meanwhile, Shalini goes for an outing to a restaurant with Shiv and the kids when some of Kabir's goons try to molest her. She slaps them and berates Shiv for not standing up for her and merely apologizing to them instead. Shiv asks her and the kids to wait outside and thrashes the goons in the restaurant himself, revealing himself to be SPD Parshuram, a special task officer who is actually working undercover as an insurance agent, along with his dialogue, "Vishnu ke chhathe avatar Parshuram ka hathiyar tha farsa aur Kaliyug ke common man Parshuram ka hathiyar hai Prahar aur yeh chhah chamber wali revolver, (Vishnu's sixth incarnation Parashurama's weapon was an axe, and the common-man Parshuram's weapon is a six-chambered revolver.)" While he attacks, Sheetal, an important leader of the mafia criminal underworld who has had a crush on Shiv from college days, is watching him from behind the scenes. She realizes that Shiv is Parshuram, who had posed a great threat to the underworld for a long time, and resolves to capture and destroy him. She says, "Sheetal and smoking, both are injurious to health." and makes contact with Babbar, a bald-headed gangster and an ally of Kabir, who had also tried to bully Shalini before, to help her destroy both Shiv and Shalini. Babbar's goons kidnap Pihu and Chintu, who are saved by Shiv. As he beats up the goons with his usual 'Parshuram' dialogue, Chintu catches him with his revolver and finds out that his dad is Parshuram. Shiv then requests Chintu not to reveal his identity to anyone, including his mother and sister, though the latter had always come close to accidentally revealing Parshuram's identity, only to be signaled by Shiv himself to keep quiet. A worried Shalini files a kidnapping case against Kabir and slaps him. Understanding her feelings, Parshuram secretly catches Babbar, only to find that the latter had escaped with the help of one of his own colleagues. He catches one of Kabir's goons trying to follow Shalini, Pihu and Chintu in their car for evil intentions and thrashes him. Simultaneously, the Dixits are shocked to find out about Shalini's molestation in the restaurant, the Deshmukh kids' kidnapping and the case against Kabir, their future son-in-law. Malhar, Manish, Omkar and Sankalp Dixit set out to resolve the case with the help of CCTV footage from the same restaurant. They are secretly followed by Agent Balram, Parshuram's teammate and college best friend, at the latter's instructions. Meanwhile, Shalini's mother Deepali and elder sister Adv. Nandini suggest they call of the marriage of Kabir and Aradhya in support of Shiv and Shalini but the rest of the family, including Aradhya herself, refuses. Nandini proposes to be Shalini's lawyer against Kabir. Meanwhile, both Shiv and Shalini face threats by many gangsters, including Sheetal, that they will destroy them and their kids. Others threaten them to withdraw the case against Kabir. Chintu is kidnapped again but is saved by Parshuram. Sankalp Dixit finds out about Parshuram from Chintu but is caught and thrashed by Balram and other colleagues of Parshuram. Sheetal makes an assassination attempt on Shiv during Shalini's dance performance but fails. Babbar also tries to assassinate Shiv but the latter escapes. Meanwhile, Manish and his wife Namrata plan to invite Shalini and Shiv to Aradhya and Kabir's wedding to make Shalini confess about the kidnappings. The proposal is initially rejected by Shalini and Shiv but later, the former is manipulated by Aradhya to come. Shalini becomes increasingly worried for her family's safety and tells Nandini that she quits the case but Nandini encourages her to go forward, saying that the law is with her. Meanwhile, Kabir's father, Karan Kulkarni, enters the picture and warns Shalini to withdraw the case against his son, otherwise she and her family will be burnt alive. On the other hand, Parshuram and Balram discover that Sheetal's actual name is Shikha Talwar, a girl from their college days. During Kabir and Aradhya's wedding, Shalini and the kids arrive. Shiv initially departs from there after dropping them, but later returns. Kabir and Aradhya are happily wed, and Shalini and Shiv are still threatened by Karan to withdraw Kabir's case throughout. After the wedding, Kabir's court case is scheduled. Despite the threats, with Nandini's help, Shalini bravely gives the statement against Kabir, who is then sent to prison for 14 days, until the next court session. In revenge, Karan refuses to let Aradhya inside the house and does not consider her his daughter-in-law. He threatens Malhar that he will destroy the Dixit family. The Dixits, including Aradhya herself, blame Shalini for Aradhya's misfortunes and lash out at her supporters, Deepali, Nandini and Shalini's cousin-in-law Bhoomika for encouraging her to jail Kabir. Concerned for Aradhya, Shalini and Shiv take Aradhya to her in-laws' house. When they reach, Karan forbids them from entering. Shiv Prasad fights Karan's goons (without Shalini or Aradhya's knowledge) and Shalini sends Aradhya inside after defying Karan. With constant encouragement from Advocate Anjali Awasthi, she defends a girl from a man abusing her in a bus. Furious at the imprisonment of his son-in-law, Manish swears to take revenge from Shalini and her family. He allies with Sheetal and Babbar, who plan to kill Shiv and blame Shalini for the murder. Meanwhile, Shalini informs her mother Deepali by phone that she is going to Manali with Shiv and the kids for a late honeymoon. When Manish gets to know of this, he reports this to Sheetal and Babbar immediately. Accordingly, Sheetal secretly chases them, along with Babbar (who sends his goons to attack Shiv in the train only for them to be thrashed by him). But Sheetal, however, has her own plans. She calls up Shalini and repeatedly tells her that Shiv will be hers. When Shiv and his family reach Manali, some more of Babbar's goons attack them. Shiv attempts to fend them off, but is shot, seemingly by Shalini, who is the only one there with a gun in her hands. He is shocked for a moment, before passing out. Shalini also falls unconscious, as she was hit on her head exactly at that moment. On regaining consciouness, Shiv (who is surprisingly alive) finds himself in the hospital and Shalini in the local police station, where Inspector Shashank question her. She keeps telling them that she has not killed her husband and that she is innocent, but they refuse to believe her, and plan to trial her in court. Rumours also spread back in her neighborhood in Mumbai that she has an extramartial affair with Vicky Sharma,a rich billionare who is in acquaintance with Karan Kulkarni.

== Cast ==
=== Main ===
- Neil Bhatt as Shiv Prasad Deshmukh a.k.a. Agent Parshuram: A special task officer working under the cover of an insurance agent; Shalini's husband; Riddhi and Harshit's father (2026)
- Shambhavi Singh as Shalini Deshmukh: A secret government officer; Malhar and Deepali's younger daughter; Nandini's sister; Shiv's wife; Riddhi and Harshit's mother (2026)
- Mahi Bhanushali as Riddhi "Pihu" Deshmukh: Shiv and Shalini's daughter; Harshit's younger sister (2026)
- Raanav Sharma as Harshit "Chintu" Deshmukh: Shiv and Shalini's son; Riddhi's elder brother (2026)

=== Recurring ===
- Farukh Saeed as Malhar Dixit: Manish's brother; Dipali's husband; Nandini and Shalini's father; Riddhi and Harshit's grandfather (2026)
- Rashika Matharu as Deepali Dixit: Malhar's wife; Nandini and Shalini's mother; Riddhi and Harshit's grandmother (2026)
- Mishmee Das as Advocate Nandini Dixit: Malhar and Deepali's elder daughter; Shalini's elder sister (2026)
- Vimarsh Roshan as Manish Dixit: Malhar's brother; Namrata's husband; Omkar, Sankalp, Aaradhya, Ayushi and Prarthana's father (2026)
- Deepali Kamat as Namrata Dixit: Manish's wife; Omkar, Sankalp, Aradhya, Ayushi and Prarthana's mother (2026)
- Himanshu Dhankhar as Omkar Dixit: Manish and Namrata's elder son; Aaradhya, Sankalp, Ayushi and Prarthana's brother; Bhumika's husband (2026)
- Saaniya Chaudhari as Bhumika Dixit: Omkar's wife (2026)
- Rohit Sharma as Sankalp Dixit: Manish and Namrata's younger son; Omkar, Aradhya, Ayushi and Prarthana's brother (2026)
- Tanya Kaur as Ayushi Dixit: Manish and Namrata's second daughter; Omkar, Sankalp, Aaradhya and Prarthana's sister (2026)
- Sonia Keswani as Prarthana Dixit: Manish and Namrata's youngest daughter; Aaradhya, Omkar, Sankalp and Ayushi's sister (2026)
- Khalid Siddiqui as Karan Kulkarni: Bhargavi's husband; Kabir's father (2026)
- Supriya Pilgaonkar as Bhargavi Kulkarni: A school principal; Karan's wife; Kabir's mother (2026)
- Aditya Syal as Kabir Kulkarni: Karan and Bhargavi's son; Aaradhya's husband (2026)
- Surbhi Mittal as Aaradhya Dixit Kulkarni: Manish and Namrata's eldest daughter; Omkar, Sankalp, Ayushi and Prarthana's sister; Kabir's wife (2026)
- Roshni Tanwi Bhattacharya as Shikha Talwar a.k.a. Sheetal: A gangster woman having secret crush on Shiv from college days (2026)(Dead)
- Sushant Marya as Deepak Deshpande a.k.a. Dodo: Kabir's friend (2026)
- Unknown as Babbar: A gangster (2026)
- Anshul Bammi as Vikram "Vicky" Sharma: Shalini's obsessive love interest; Shivani's ex boyfriend (2026)
- Vikkas Pareek as Inspector Shashank (2026)
- Mayank Mishra as Agent Balram: Shiv's best friend and trusted teammate (2026)
- Arshi Bharti as Agent Maya: An agent and teammate of Shiv Prasad, Balram and Saurabh (2026)
- Gautam Suuri as Agent Saurabh: An agent and teammate of Shiv, Balram and Maya (2026)

=== Guest appearances ===
- Kanwar Dhillon as Sachin Deshmukh from Udne Ki Aasha in Deshmukh vs Deshmukh Mahasangam (2026)
- Neha Harsora as Sailee Jadhav from Udne Ki Aasha in Deshmukh vs Deshmukh Mahasangam (2026)
- Puru Chibber as Tejas Deshmukh from Udne Ki Aasha in Deshmukh vs Deshmukh Mahasangam (2026)
- Radhika Vidyasagar as Renuka Deshmukh from Udne Ki Aasha in Deshmukh vs Deshmukh Mahasangam (2026)
- Shama Deshpande as Savitri Deshmukh from Udne Ki Aasha in Deshmukh vs Deshmukh Mahasangam (2026)
- Shritama Mitra as Advocate Anjali Awasthi from Advocate Anjali Awasthi in Action Ka Blockbuster (2026)

== Production ==
=== Casting ===
Shambhavi Singh was signed to play Shalini. Neil Bhatt confirmed to join the cast to play the dual personality roles of Shiv working as undercover officer Parshuram. Child actors Mahi Bhanusali and Raanav Sharma were cast as Riddhi and Harshit Deshmukh respectively. Rohit Sharma was cast as Sankalp. Khalid Siddiqui was selected to portray in an antagonist role, Karan. In June 2026, Advocate Anjali Awasthi fame Anshul Bammi was cast in a pivotal role.

=== Filming ===
The team shot some action sequences in Manali hills in June 2026. Also, they choreographed a romantic dance scene there. Prior to this, Neil Bhatt performed a 'Shantabai' dance sequence on his own as Shivprasad, which filmed in a single take. The final shooting of the series wrapped up on 30 July 2026.

=== Cancellation ===
After a time slot change from 8.30 p.m.to early evening 7.00 p.m. slot, due to the low viewership and declining TRPs, the channel pulled the plug on 18 August 2026.

== Crossovers ==
On 12 April 2026, Mr and Mrs Parshuram aired a mahasangam episode called, Action Ka Blockbuster, the episode features Anjali LLB from Advocate Anjali Awasthi defending Kabir before a courtroom confrontation that unveils hidden details and she switches support to Shalini.

On 23 March 2026, Udne Ki Aasha aired a one-hour special episode called, Deshmukh Vs Deshmukh Mahasangam, wherein Sachin from Udne Ki Aasha got to know about Shiv's dual identity as Parshuram and they both keep it hidden from Sailee and Shalini.

== Reception ==
In its debut week, The show ranked at tenth spot with a TRP of 1.6 in week 5 of February. In the following week, it got 1.5 TRP. In week 7, it was in tenth position in BARC chart. In April 2026, it recorded a rating of 1.4 TRP.

== Awards and nominations ==
Year	Award	Category	Recipient	Result	Ref.
2026	Indian Television Academy Awards	Best Actor - Drama - TV	Neil Bhatt	Pending	
2026	Indian Television Academy Awards	Best Music Composer - TV	Rupsnaato Chakraborty	Pending	
2026	Indian Television Academy Awards	Best Story - TV	Snehasish Chakraborty	Pending	
