= Daar Ughad Baye =

2022 Indian Marathi-language TV series

- Genre: Drama
- Written by: Mihir Rajda
- Starring: See below
- Country of origin: India
- Original language: Marathi
- No. of episodes: 342

Production
- Producer: Tejendra Neswankar
- Running time: 22 minutes
- Production company: Trrump Carrd Production

Original release
- Network: Zee Marathi
- Release: 19 September 2022 – 7 October 2023

Related
- Jamuna Dhaki

Daar Ughad Baye (transl. Open the Door Goddess) is an Indian Marathi language TV series which aired on Zee Marathi. It is produced by Tejendra Neswankar under the banner of Trrump Carrd Production. It premiered from 19 September 2022 and ended on 7 October 2023. It starred Saniya Chaudhari, Roshan Vichare and Sharad Ponkshe in lead roles. It is an official remake of Bengali TV series Jamuna Dhaki.

== Plot ==
This show narrates the story of a girl, Mukta, who goes to the Nagarkar mansion to play the Sambal on behalf of her father. Mukta is forced to take up her father's position as a drum player. When she gets married into an aristocratic family, she struggles to maintain a balance in her personal and professional life.

=== Special episode (1 hour) ===
1. 20 November 2022
2. 11 December 2022
3. 8 January 2023
4. 5 February 2023
5. 12 March 2023
6. 2 April 2023
7. 14 May 2023
8. 25 June 2023
9. 23 July 2023
10. 10 September 2023

=== Airing history ===
No.	Airing Date	Days	Time (IST)
1	19 September 2022 – 23 September 2023	Mon-Sat (sometimes Sun)	8.30 pm
2	25 September – 7 October 2023	Mon-Sat (sometimes Sun)	2 pm

== Cast ==
=== Main ===
- Saniya Chaudhari as Mukta Aatmaram Shinde / Mukta Sarang Nagarkar
- Roshan Vichare as Sarang Raosaheb Nagarkar

=== Recurring ===
Sarang's family

- Sharad Ponkshe as Raosaheb Nanasaheb Nagarkar (Dada) / Kashinath
- Suhas Paranjape as Vaijayanti Raosaheb Nagarkar
- Kishori Ambiye as Ambika Nanasaheb Nagarkar
- Maya Jadhav as Chandrakala Imampurkar / Chandrakala Nanasaheb Nagarkar
- Mohiniraj Gatne as Bhausaheb Nanasaheb Nagarkar
- Madhavi Dabholkar as Madhavi Bhausaheb Nagarkar
- Bhagyashri Dalvi as Renuka Raosaheb Nagarkar
- Shahu Savekar as Yuvraj Bhausaheb Nagarkar
- Gauri Pendse as Gayatri Bhausaheb Nagarkar

Mukta's family

- Kishor Chaughule as Aatmaram Shinde
- Mrinalini Jawale as Kusum Aatmaram Shinde
- Sahil Joshi as Gajya Aatmaram Shinde
- Vaishnavi Ghodke as Bhakti Aatmaram Shinde

Others

- Vandana Gupte as Suhasini Desai
- Meera Joshi as Champa
- Shraddha Mahajan as Aarya Prataprao Nimbalkar
- Mohan Khambete as Prataprao Nimbalkar
- Chitra Khare as Sumati Prataprao Nimbalkar
- Atharva Marathe as Ved Vishwasrao Deshmukh
- Milind Dastane as Vishwasrao Deshmukh
- Pradnya Kelkar as Janaki Vishwasrao Deshmukh
- Vinita Shinde as Ved's aunt
- Mahima Mhatre as Jaya
- Laxmikant Dabholkar as Devdatta
- Chinmay Patwardhan as Papya
- Pramod Shelar as Kanta
- Yogeshkumar Powar as Bhairu
- Geeta Panchal as Asha
- Vikas Thorat as Damu
- Amol Naik as Sunil
- Reena Pimpale as Godamai
- Tejas Raut as Hrishi

== Adaptations ==
Language	Title	Original Release	Network(s)	Last aired	Notes
Bengali	Jamuna Dhaki যমুনা ঢাকি	13 July 2020	Zee Bangla	1 July 2022	Original
Punjabi	Geet Dholi ਗੀਤ ਢੋਲੀ	30 August 2021	Zee Punjabi	2 February 2024	Remake
Marathi	Daar Ughad Baye दार उघड बये	19 September 2022	Zee Marathi	7 October 2023	Remake
