= Boron (TV series) =

Indian Bengali television series

- Genre: Drama; Romance; Comedy
- Screenplay by: Snehasish Chakraborty
- Story by: Snehasish Chakraborty
- Directed by: Sukamal Nath
- Creative director: Snehasish Chakraborty
- Starring: Indrani Paul; Sushmit Mukherjee
- Voices of: Dipanita & Joy
- Opening theme: "Boron"
- Composer: Snehasish Chakraborty
- Country of origin: India
- Original language: Bengali
- No. of seasons: 1
- No. of episodes: 347

Production
- Executive producers: Runa & Sudip (Blues Productions); Samajita, Arpita & Dipanwita (Star Jalsha)
- Producer: Snehasish Chakraborty
- Production location: Kolkata
- Cinematography: Debabrata Mallick
- Editors: Bapon & Ajhar
- Camera setup: Multi-camera
- Running time: 22 minutes
- Production company: Blues Productions

Original release
- Network: Star Jalsha
- Release: 5 April 2021 – 19 March 2022

Boron is an Indian Bengali language romantic drama television series that premiered on 5 April 2021 at Bengali General Entertainment Channel Star Jalsha and it also available on the digital platform Disney+ Hotstar. The show is produced by Snehasish Chakraborty of Blues Productions and stars Indrani Paul and Sushmit Mukherjee in lead roles.

== Plot ==
Boron narrates the story of a courageous girl who is a hardworking student named Tithi. She wants to be independent and take care of her mom who sacrificed everything for her. Tithi is preparing for an exam and wants to bag a government job.

On the other hand, a rogue and spoilt brat named Rudrik Banerjee, son of a famous industrialist Nandan Banerjee, lives a lavish life and doesn't stick to the rule always. One day, his car hits a pedestrian leaving him critically injured. Tithi witnesses the incident and decides to report it. Tithi is indomitable and doesn't bow down to Rudrik's influential status. She decides to bring justice to the aggrieved people instead.

Tithi testifies against Rudrik in the court on the day of her marriage. Swearing revenge, Rudrik breaks into Tithi's marriage and shoots the groom Raj in his leg. However he ends up marrying Tithi accidentally. Nandan decides to welcome Tithi in the Banerjee household with all due respect, despite objections of his wife and other family members. He convinces them with the help of Naira that this is just an act to remove all negative publicity from their family name. Tithi too agrees on this to save her ailing mother from any further shock.

Slowly on Nandan's request, Tithi teaches Rudrik how to be happy and generous and not to be arrogant. However, sparks fly as Rudrik falls for Tithi, but is unable to confess his feelings to her. On the day of Rudrik's marriage with Naira, Rudrik puts vermilion on Tithi's forehead realising his love for her, whereas Naira marries the wedding priest Purna Chandra "Panu" Bachaspati himself to save her from humiliation.

== Cast ==
=== Main ===
- Indrani Paul as Tithi Banerjee (née Mukherjee) – Parineeta and Raghav's daughter; Prodosh's half-sister; Rudrik's wife.
- Sushmit Mukherjee as Rudrik Banerjee – Nandan and Pritha's son; Sonnrita and Rimjhim's brother; Tithi's husband.

=== Recurring ===
- Priya Mondal as Naira Sen Chatterjee – Jeet's sister; Rudrik's childhood friend and one-sided lover; Prodosh's wife
- Soumodip Singha Roy as Prodosh "Panu" Chatterjee – A priest; Aparajita and Raghav's son; Tithi's half-brother; Naira's husband
- Kushal Chakraborty as Nandan Banarjee – A famous industrialist; Pritha's husband; Sonnrita, Rimjhim and Rudrik's father
- Sutapa Banerjee as Pritha Banerjee – Nandan's wife; Sonnrita, Rimjhim and Rudrik's mother
- Rimjhim Das as Rimjhim Banerjee – Nandan and Pritha's younger daughter; Sonnrita and Rudrik's sister
- Suchanda Chowdhury as Mrs. Banerjee – Nandan's mother; Sonnrita, Rimjhim and Rudrik's grandmother
- Ananya Biswas as Sonnrita Banerjee – A businesswoman; Nandan and Pritha's elder daughter; Rimjhim and Rudrik's sister; Alankar's wife
- Subhankar Saha as Alankar – Sonnrita's husband
- Debjani Chatterjee as Parineeta Mukherjee – Raghav's ex-wife; Tithi's mother
- Sohan Bandyopadhyay as Raghav Mukherjee – Parineeta's ex-husband; Aparajita's husband; Prodosh and Tithi's father
- Dolon Roy as Aparajita Chatterjee – Raghav's second wife; Prodosh's mother
- Basanti Chatterjee as Mrs. Mukherjee – Raghav's mother; Prodosh and Tithi's grandmother
- Sankar Sanku Chakraborty as Tithi's uncle
- Raja Kundu as Raj – Tithi's lover and ex-fiancé
- Rana Mitra as Mandar Banerjee – Rudrik's uncle
- Jayanta Dutta Burman as Shouptik Banerjee – Rudrik's uncle; Diti's husband
- Reshmi Bhattacharya as Diti Banerjee – Shouptik's wife
- Sudipa Basu as Tithi's elder paternal aunt
- Sayantani Majumdar as Aalta Mukherjee – Tithi's aunt
- Riya Ganguly as Keka Banerjee- Rudrik's sister-in-law
- Priyanka Mukherjee as Kakoli Banerjee- Rudrik's younger cousin sister
- Minashree Sarkar as Kuheli Banerjee - Rudrik's younger cousin sister
- Rupsha Chatterjee as Rupsha Banerjee- Rudrik's cousin sister
- Judhajit Banerjee as Jeet Sen- a businessman; Naira's elder brother
- Sahamita Acharya as Preksha- Tithi's younger cousin sister
- Unknown as Alankar's mother
