= Shweta Bhattacharya =

Indian television and film actress

Sweta Bhattacharya
- Born: 21 September 1992 (age 34); Gorabazar, Dum Dum, Kolkata, India
- Occupation: Actress
- Years active: 2008 – present
- Notable work: Kon Gopone Mon Bheseche; Sindoorkhela; Jamuna Dhaki; Jarowar Jhumko
- Spouse: Rubel Das (m. 2025)

Shweta Bhattacharya (born 21 September 1992) is an Indian actress who works in Bengali television and films. She is best known for her roles in television soap operas Sindoor Khela, Jamuna Dhaki, Jay Kanhaiya Lal Ki and Tumi Robe Nirobe.

In 2008, Bhattacharya began her acting career with a role in a Bengali TV series. She gained popularity after she starred in Sindoor Khela.

== Works ==
=== Films ===
Year	Title	Role	Note	Ref.
2009	Challenge	A college student	Special appearance	
2009	Prem Aamar	Riya's Friend		
2010	Le Chakka			
2022	Projapoti	Mala		

=== Television ===
Year	Serial	Role	Channel	Language(s)	Notes	Ref.
2010 - 2012	Sindoorkhela	Simontini Sen aka Moni	Star Jalsha	Bengali	Lead Role	
2012 - 2014	@Bhalobasha.com	Mithi	Star Jalsha	Bengali	Lead Role	
2014 - 2016	Tumi Robe Nirobe	Jheel Mukherjee (née Banerjee)	Zee Bangla	Bengali	Lead Role	
2016 - 2017	Jorowar Jhumko	Jhumko Roy	Zee Bangla	Bengali	Lead Role	
2018	Jai Kanhaiya Lal Ki	Dali Chowdhury	Star Bharat	Hindi Debut	Lead Role	
2019	Konok Kakon	Kakon	Colors Bangla	Bengali	Lead Role	
2020 - 2022	Jamuna Dhaki	Jamuna Roy (née Das) / Jyoti Sen (in disguise) / Jhimli	Zee Bangla	Bengali	Lead Role	
2022 - 2023	Sohag Jol	Juiee Chatterjee (née Paul Chowdhury)	Zee Bangla	Bengali	Lead Role	
2023–2025	Kon Gopone Mon Bheseche	Shyamali Mullick (née Malakar)	Zee Bangla	Bengali	Lead Role	

=== Mahalaya ===
Year	Program	Character	Channel
15 October 2012	Mahishasurmardini	Dance Performance on Jaya Jaya Japyaja	Star Jalsha
30 September 2016	Matrirupeno	Devi Durga and Devi Satakshi/Shakambhari	Zee Bangla
17 September 2020	Durga Saptashati Sambhavami Yuge Yuge	Devi Mahishasuramardini	Zee Bangla
6 October 2021	Nanarupe Mahamaya	Devi Parvati and Devi Chinnamasta	Zee Bangla
25 September 2022	Singhobahini Trinayani	Devi Parvati and Devi Ganeshjanani	Zee Bangla
14 October 2023	Nobopotrikaye Debiboron	Devi Maheshwari/Shiba	Zee Bangla
2 October 2024	Noboroope Debi Durga	Devi Skandamata	Zee Bangla
21 September 2025	Jago Maa Jago Durga	Devi Durga	Zee Bangla
21 September 2025	Jaya Jaya Hey Mahishasuramardini	Devi Mahamaya and Devi Mahishasurmardini	Telly Durga
10 October 2026	Asubhonashini Trinayani	Devi Parvati	Zee Bangla

== Awards ==
Year	Award	Category	Character	Film/TV show
2015	Zee Bangla Sonar Sansar Awards 2015	Priyo Bouma	Jhil	Tumi Robe Nirobe
2016	Zee Bangla Sonar Sansar Awards 2016	Priyo Juti (with Subhankar Saha)	Jhil-Sonju	Tumi Robe Nirobe
2017	Zee Bangla Sonar Sansar Awards 2017	Priyo Juti (with Subhankar Saha)	Jhumko-Kohinoor	Jorowar Jhumko
2017	Zee Bangla Sonar Sansar Awards 2017	Priyo Bouma	Jhumko	Jorowar Jhumko
2021	Zee Bangla Sonar Sansar Awards 2021	Priyo Nayika	Jomuna	Jamuna Dhaki
2021	Zee Bangla Sonar Sansar Awards 2021	Priyo Bouma	Jomuna	Jamuna Dhaki
2022	Zee Bangla Sonar Sansar Awards 2022	Priyo Bouma	Jomuna	Jamuna Dhaki
2022	Tele Academy Awards 2022	Inspirational Character	Jomuna	Jamuna Dhaki
2022	Telly Adda Awards 2022	All Time Favourite Actress	Jomuna ( Shweta Bhattacharya )	Jamuna Dhaki
2022	Telly Adda Awards 2022	Golden Bonding		
2023	Zee Bangla Sonar Sansar Awards 2023	Zee Bangla Jury's Special Award	Jui	Sohag Jol
2023	Kolkata Glitz Award	Star Performer (Female)		
2024	Zee Bangla Sonar Sansar Awards 2024	Sonar Somporko	Shyamoli	Kon Gopone Mon Bheseche
2024	Telly Adda Awards 2024	Most Popular Face	Shyamoli ( Shweta Bhattacharya )	Kon Gopone Mon Bheseche
2025	Zee Bangla Sonar Sansar Awards 2025	Priyo Bouma	Shyamoli	Kon Gopone Mon Bheseche
2026	Zee Bangla Sonar Sansar Awards 2026	Sonar Somporko		
