= Kon Gopone Mon Bheseche =

2023 Indian television series

- Genre: Drama; Romance
- Created by: Samrat Ghosh
- Written by: Dialogues; Souvik Chakraborty
- Screenplay by: Malova Majumder
- Story by: Souvik Chakraborty
- Directed by: Snehasish Jana, Anup Chakraborty.
- Creative director: Srijit Ray
- Starring: Shweta Bhattacharya; Ranojoy Bishnu
- Theme music composer: Suvam Moitra
- Opening theme: Kon Gopone Mon Bheseche by Prashmita Pal
- Country of origin: India
- Original language: Bengali
- No. of episodes: 534

Production
- Executive producers: Krishanu Ganguly; Urvish Bose; Srijita Chakraborty (Zee Bangla)
- Producer: Zee Bangla
- Production locations: Indrapuri Studio, Kolkata
- Cinematography: Biswajit Mitra
- Editors: Jishu Nath; Biplab Mondal; Pappu Baidya
- Camera setup: Multi-camera
- Running time: 23 Minutes
- Production company: Zee Bangla Productions

Original release
- Network: Zee Bangla
- Release: 18 December 2023 – 6 September 2025

Kon Gopone Mon Bheseche (transl. Where did the heart float/drift secretly?) is a 2023 Indian Bengali Romantic Drama television series that premiered from 18 December 2023 on Zee Bangla and went off air on 6 September 2025. The series was produced by under the banner of Zee Bangla In-house Productions. It starred Shweta Bhattacharya and Ranojoy Bishnu in lead roles.

== Cast ==
=== Main ===
- Shweta Bhattacharya as Shyamoli Mallick (née Malakar) alias Teesta Mitra (assumed identity) aka Bornomala 'Mala' Ghoshal (assumed identity): Aniket's wife and love interest; Suryakanta's daughter-in-law and proclaimed daughter; Subal and Khokon's elder sister; Kinjal & Mandar's ex-love interest.
- Ranojoy Bishnu as Aniket Mallick aka Ani: Shyamali's husband and love interest; Suryakanta and Anuradha's son; Aparajita's stepson; Phanibhushan's eldest grand-son; Kinjal & Rohini's paternal half-brother; Ahona & Ananya's ex-love interest.

=== Recurring ===
- Debojyoti Roy Chowdhury as
  - Mandar Chowdhury: Rohini's husband; Shyamali's former obsessive one-sided lover, later became Shyamali's best friend and brother-in-law.
  - Raghu (Dead): Mandar's lookalike, a goon and hitman who used to work for Anna Bhai in Sultanpur, later kept as captive in Anna Bhai's ashram.
- Mishmee Das / Soumi Chakraborty as Rohini Chowdhury (née Mullick) aka Roh: Suryakanta and Aparajita's daughter; Kinjal's sister; Aniket's half-sister; Shyamali's sister-in-law; Mandar's wife.
- Sourya Bhattacharya as Apratim Bhowmik aka Pratim: Madhusudhan and Alpona’s youngest grandson; Arunendu & Apala's youngest son; Arunava's brother; Aniket, Rohini & Kinjal's cousin brother (not by blood relation); Priyanjali's husband.
- Ashmita Chakraborty as Priyanjali Bhowmik (née Mullick) aka Priya: Chandrakanta & Maitreyee's daughter; Phanibhushan’s granddaughter; Aniket, Rohini & Kinjal's cousin sister; Apratim's wife.
- Uday Pratap Singh / Swarup Dey as Kinjal Mallick: Suryakanta and Aparajita's son, Rohini's brother; Aniket's half-brother, Shyamali’s brother-in-law and obsessive one-sided lover.
- Ayendri Lavnia Roy as Upasana Sanyal: Daughter of businessman Unmesh Sanyal and Kinjal’s obsessive one-sided lover.
- Jayanta Banerjee as Phanibhusan Mullick aka Phani: Patriarch of Jora Bari, co-owner of The Great Bengal Caterer, Madhusudan's friend turned declared brother, Suryakanta and Chandrakanta's father; Aniket, Kinjal, Rohini, Priya's paternal grandfather - “Boro Dadu”; Shyamali’s grandfather-in-law.
- Saumya Sengupta as Madhusudan Sengupta aka Madhu: Co-owner of Great Bengal caterer, Phanibhusan's friend turned brother, Alpona's husband, Apala's father; Arunava and Apratim's maternal grandfather - “Choto Dadu”.
- Sukriti Lahori as Alpona Sengupta: Madhusudan's wife, Apala mother; Aniket's younger grandmother - “Thammi”
- Aditi Chatterjee as Aparajita Mullick (née Nandi): Suryakanta's second wife, Rohini and Kinjal's mother; Aniket's stepmother (“Mamoni”); Shyamali’s step mother-in-law; Baibhav’s sister.
- Animesh Bhaduri in a dual role
  - Suryakanta Mullick: Aparajita's husband; Anuradha's ex-husband; Aniket, Rohini and Kinjal's father, Phanibhusan's eldest son; Shyamali’s father-in-law and proclaimed father.
  - Late Chandrakanta Mullick: Maitreyee's husband, Priya's father, Phanibhusan's youngest son.
- Tanushree Goswami as Maitreyee Mullick: Priya's mother; Chandrakanta's widow; Aniket, Rohini and Kinjal's aunt (“Kakimoni”); Pratim's mother-in-law, Shyamali’s aunt-in-law.
- Suchandrima as Apala Bhowmick (née Sengupta) (Antagonist): Madhusudan and Alpona's daughter; Arunendu's estranged wife, Arunava and Apratim's mother, Trisha and Priya's mother-in-law
- Sanjay Basu as Arunendu Bhowmick: Apala's estranged husband, Arunava and Pratim's father, Trisha and Priya's father-in-law.
- Neil Chatterjee as Arunava Bhowmick aka Aru (Main antagonist): Arunendu and Apala's eldest son; Pratim's brother; Madhusudan and Alpona’s eldest grandson; Trisha’s husband.
- Sreetama Roy Chowdhury as Trisha Bhowmick (Main Antagonist): Arunava's wife, Apala and Arunendu's daughter-in-law.
- Avrajit Chakraborty as Baibhav Nandi: Aparajita’s brother; Aniket, Kinjal and Rohini’s maternal uncle.
- Paromita Ghosh as Sonali: House-help of Jorabari.
- Roshni Tanwi Bhattacharya / Manosi Sengupta as Ahona Basu (antagonist): Aniket’s ex-love interest, Kinjal's friend and Sumedh Chauhan’s love interest.
- Siddhartha Banerjee as Sumedh Chauhan: Aniket's office colleague & Ahona's love interest.
- Dipanjan Bhattacharya as Chandrashish Roy (Antagonist): Indrashish & Brinda's brother, Businessman dealing in drugs.
- Satabdi Nag as Brinda Roy (Antagonist): Chandrashish & Indrashish's sister, whose crush was Aniket
- Unknown as Indrashish Roy: Chandrashish & Brinda's brother; Ananya's love interest and fiance.
- Anuradha Mukherjee as Ananya Mitra: Amitava Mitra’s daughter, heir of Tech G Global company; Indrashish’s love interest and fiancee.
- Niladri Lahiri as Amitava Mitra: Ananya's father, Owner of Tech G Global company.
- Priyanjali Das as Binti.
- Arpita Chowdhury as Sulata Di.
- Senjuti Sengupta as Anuradha Gupta: Suryakanta's ex-wife, Aniket's Mother, Shyamali’s mother-in-law.
- Saugata Bandyopadhyay as Tirthankar: Aniket's colleague and rival in Tech G Global.
- Madhurima Mukherjee as Manjusha: Ahona's friend.
- Pratiti Mitra as Payel: Ahona's friend.
- Konkona Haldar as Shruti: Ahona's friend.
- Sourav Das as Subal Malakar: Shyamoli's younger brother.
- Mouli Dutta as Chaya Malakar: Subal's wife.
- Sujoy Saha as Khokon Malakar: Shyamoli's youngest brother.
- Aditi Ghosh / Banani Dey as Sheuli Malakar: Khokon's wife.
- Debesh Chattopadhyay as Master Moshai: Shyamoli's teacher, mentor, father-figure and well-wisher.
- Oliva Bhattacharya as Binad's wife.
- Kaustuv Sengupta as Hiranmoy Das: A police officer and close friend of Suryakanta.
- Biswajit Chakraborty as Shivshankar Roy: Madhusudan's cousin.
- Sandip Chakraborty as Brojo Gopal
- Sankar Sanku Chakrabarty as Sushmit Roy: Family lawyer of Jorabari.
- Gautam Mukherjee as Debabrata: Pratik's father.
- Shamik Sinha as Ardhendu Sen; Jacky's father.
- Arijeet Ganguly as Jyotirmoy Sen aka Jacky.
- Priyanka Bysack as Simran: Intern at Tech G Global.
- Sreetama Mukherjee as Tiyasha: Intern at Tech G Global.
- Srotoswini Sroto as Pushpita.
- Unknown as Mohit.
- Sutirtha Saha as Pratik: Rohini's obsessive lover and ex-fiancée.
- Abhishek Bhowmik as Abhijeet aka Sounak: Rohini's namesake lover and ex-husband.
- Arup Roy as Pintu, peon of Tech G Global.
- Aritram Mukherjee as Milind; Ananya's ex-fiańcee.
- Arindam Banerjee as Dr. Kushal Ganguly - Shyamoli and Aniket's doctor.
- Anindyo Sarkar as Unmesh Sanyal: A businessman & Upasana's father.
- Chhanda Karanji Chatterjee as Bornomala’s maternal grandmother - “Dimma”.
- Raja Chatterjee as Don, Chandrashish Roy’s old rival.
- Arghya Mukherjee as Minister Debranjan Banerjee.
- Debdyuti Ghosh as Minister’s wife.
- Poonam Basak as Rini Banerjee, Minister’s daughter.
- Chhandak Choudhury as Priyanjali’s boss and owner of ‘Taal Tribez’.
- Mishor Bose
- Raja Chatterjee Debashish as Judge.
- Jasmine Roy as Jasmine - anchor in a culinary reality Television show “Hensheler Heroine” where Shyamali and Trisha participate.
- Rupsha Chatterjee
- Ayan Sengupta - as Anil, director of the show “Hensheler Heroine”.
- Kaushik Bhattacharya - as Kaushik Kundu, Channel Head where “Hensheler Heroine” aired.
- Bhaskar Banerjee as Judge Ramkinkor Laha
- Anindya Banerjee as Advocate Probal Basu
- Sonalisa Das as Vaidehi Upadhyay, investigating officer.
- Debraj Mukherjee as Anna Bhai, a dreaded gangster involved in arms dealing, drugs smuggling and human trafficking, in Sultanpur.
- Tannistha Biswas as Rishav’s mother, Aparajita’s friend.
- Sandeep De
- Unknown as RJ Srijan
- Amritendu Kar as Tulu Halder

=== Guest Appearance on "Mahasangam" special cross over 5 episodes with "Mittir Bari" ===
- Parijat Chaudhari as Jonaki Mitra (née Biswas)
- Adrit Roy as Dhrubo Mitra
- Dulal Lahiri as Sudhacharan Mitra
- Anuradha Roy as Chandrabati Mitra
- Sonali Chowdhury as Tapati Mitra
- Soma Banerjee as Meenakshi Roy Chowdhury aka Minu
- Sumit Somaddar as Ananda Roy Chowdhury
- Debomoy Mukherjee as Binoy Mitra
- Monika Dey as Swati Mitra
- Sohail Dutta as Rick Mitra
- Sayosree Dey as Ritu Mitra
- Ananya Guha as Sanjana Roy
- Kaushik Chakraborty as Advocate Raghu Roy

=== Guest Appearance ===
- Biswajit Ghosh as Actor Nayan Kumar (Cameo)
- Nabanita Malakar as Nayan Kumar's wife (Cameo)

== Reception ==
=== 2023 ===
Week	BARC Viewership		Ref.
Week	TRP	Rank	Ref.
Week 51	7.8	5	
