= Jai Kanhaiya Lal Ki (2018 TV series) =

2018 Hindi comedy television series

- Genre: Drama; Comedy; Romance
- Created by: Blues Productions
- Based on: Bhojo Gobindo
- Written by: Snehashish Chakraborty & Sanjeev Tiwari (dialogues)
- Starring: Vishal Vashishtha; Shweta Bhattacharya; Dipankar De; Rupanjana Mitra
- Opening theme: Jai Kanhaiya Lal Ki
- Composer: Snehasish Chakroborty
- Country of origin: India
- Original language: Hindi
- No. of seasons: 1
- No. of episodes: 127

Production
- Producer: Snehasish Chakroborty
- Running time: 22 minutes

Original release
- Network: Star Bharat
- Release: 1 January – 28 May 2018

Related
- Bhojo Gobindo

Jai Kanhaiya Lal Ki is a Hindi television comedy soap opera that premiered on Star Bharat from 1 January 2018. The show is set in Kolkata, West Bengal. This is the remake of popular Bengali serial Bhojo Gobindo that aired on Star Jalsha. The series went off air on 28 May 2018. The whole series is digitally available on Disney+ Hotstar.

== Plot ==
The show revolves around three main characters; Janki Nath Chaudhry, Dali, and Kanhaiya. It narrates the story of a rich grandfather Janki Nath Chaudhary and his spoilt granddaughter Dali whereas Vishal Vashittha came on board as Kanhaiya who plays the character of Bawarchi on the show. The story is about a grandfather and his spoilt grand daughter Dali and how a cook changed their lives. In the end, Kanhaiya marries Daali.

== Cast ==
=== Main ===
- Vishal Vashishtha as Shaurya Gupta "Kanhaiya"
- Shweta Bhattacharya as Daali Chaudhary
- Dipankar De as Janki Prasad Chaudhary
- Rupanjana Mitra as Sandhya Nath Chaudhary
- Harshit Arora as Rocky

=== Recurring ===
- Tramila Bhattacharjee as Vaijanti Mousi
- Madhurima Basak as Maya
- Rajdeep Gupta as Ravi
- Prakruti Mishra as Devyani
- Neha Tiwari as Sheila
- Purnima Kaushik as Munni
- Sonu Dagar as Masterje
- Rahul Ghosh as Rocket

== Adaptations ==
Language	Title	Original release	Network(s)	Last aired
Bengali	Bhojo Gobindo ভজ গোবিন্দ	29 May 2017	Star Jalsha	8 December 2018
