= Dolon Roy =

Indian actress

- Born: Kolkata, India
- Occupation: Actress
- Spouse: Dipankar Dey (m. 2020)

Dolon Roy (also spelt as Dolon Ray) is a Bengali actress, based in Kolkata, India.

== Early life ==
She was born in Kolkata to Dilip and Dipika Roy. Roy graduated from the Charuchandra College and subsequently earned a postgraduate degree in science from the University of Calcutta. She is married to actor Dipankar Dey. They got married in 2020.

== Filmography ==
Year	Title	Role	Language
1991	Sajani Go Sajani		Bengali
1992	Apan Par		Bengali
1995	Kakababu Here Gelen?		Bengali
1996	Sanghat		Bengali
1997	Gudgudee	Mano	Hindi
2011	Charuulata		Bengali
2013	Alik Sukh		Bengali
2017	Thammar Boyfriend		Bengali
2017	Haripada Haribol		Bengali
2018	Drishtikone	Nurse	Bengali

== Television ==
Year	Title	Role	Language	Channel
2009-2013	Sholo Aana		Bengali	Colors Bangla
2009-2014	Maa....Tomay Chara Ghum Ashena	Mohini Chatterjee	Bengali	Star Jalsha
2014-2015	Thik Jeno Love Story	Krishna	Bengali	Star Jalsha
2015	Mon Niye Kachakachi	Parama Sanyal	Bengali	Star Jalsha
2013-2016	Tomay Amay Mile	Abha Sundari	Bengali	Star Jalsha
2010-2014	@Bhalobasha.com	Tora's Mother	Bengali	Star Jalsha
2012-2013	Care Kori Na	Malabika Mukherjee	Bengali	Star Jalsha
2014	Byomkesh Bakshi (TV Series)	Mohini	Bengali	Colors Bangla
2016-2018	Bojhena Se Bojhena	Khushi's mother	Bengali	Star Jalsha
2016-2018	Stree	Nomita	Bengali	Zee Bangla
2017-2018	Bhojo Gobindo	Sudha Sen	Bengali	Star Jalsha
2018-2019	Aloy Bhuban Bhora		Bengali	Colors Bangla
2017-2019	Seemarekha	Ranjana Roy	Bengali	Star Jalsha
2019-2021	Alo Chhaya	Alokananda Sengupta	Bengali	Zee Bangla
2020-2021	Jibon Saathi	Durba	Bengali	Zee Bangla
2020-2022	Khelaghor	Somdatta Chatterjee	Bengali	Star Jalsha
2021-2022	Boron	Aparajita Chatterjee	Bengali	Star Jalsha
2022-2024	Tumpa Autowali	Girija	Bengali	Colors Bangla
2024	Diamond Didi Zindabad	Brinda Ganguly	Bengali	Zee Bangla
2024	Tomader Rani	Aditya’s mother	Bengali	Star Jalsha
2025–Present	Professor Bidya Banerjee		Bengali	Star Jalsha

== Awards ==
- National Film Award – Special Jury Award / Special Mention (Feature Film) her performance in the 1996 film "Sanghat" directed by Pinaki Choudhury.
