= Tumi Robe Nirobe =

Bengali romance television series

- Logo of the series
- Genre: Romance
- Created by: Blues Productions
- Written by: Dialogues; Snehashish Chakraborty
- Story by: Snehashish Chakraborty
- Directed by: Rajendra Prosad Das
- Starring: Shweta Bhattacharya; Subhankar Saha; Arjun Chakraborty; Rita Dutta Chakraborty; Anusuya Majumdar; Bhaswar Chatterjee
- Theme music composer: Snehashish Chakraborty
- Opening theme: "Tar Boba Chokh"
- Ending theme: "Tumi Robe Nirobe"
- Country of origin: India
- Original language: Bengali
- No. of seasons: 1
- No. of episodes: 347

Production
- Producer: Snehashish Chakraborty
- Production location: West Bengal
- Running time: 22 minutes
- Production company: Blues Productions

Original release
- Network: Zee Bangla
- Release: 15 December 2014 – 16 January 2016

Tumi Robe Nirobe (English: your voice in the silence) (2014) is a Bengali romance television series which aired on Bengali General Entertainment Channel Zee Bangla. The show was telecast from Monday to Saturday.

== Plot ==
The plot revolves around the love story of two special people, Jheel (Shweta Bhattacharya) and Sanju (Shubhankar Saha). They are both disabled. Jheel is the lead dancer of a dance group called Taal. This dance group is also special because all the performers in the group are disabled. Jheel has a sister, Dighi, who is also disabled. These two orphan sisters are trying to live their lives against all odds. In the course of time, Jheel and Sanju meet through Sanju's father (Arjun Chakraborty). How Jheel and Sanju develop the most special relationship is the story of Tumi Robe Nirobe.

== Cast ==
- Shweta Bhattacharya as Jheel Mukherjee (née Banerjee)
- Subhankar Saha as Sanjit Mukherjee a.k.a. Sanju

=== Recurring ===
- Arjun Chakraborty as Jashojit Mukherjee
- Rita Dutta Chakraborty / Suchismita Chowdhury as Leela Sen Mukherjee
- Anusuya Majumdar as Jaya Bhattacharya
- Sourav Chakraborty as Biswajit Mukherjee
- Sanjuktaa Roy Chowdhury as Rakha
- Tonni Laha Roy as Dighi Mukherjee (née Banerjee)
- Puja Ganguly / Sreemoyee Chattoraj / Upanita Banerjee as Sneha Roy (née Mukherjee)
- Bhaswar Chatterjee as Abhishek
- Riya Ganguly Chakraborty as Sayori
- Lily Chakravarty as Sunetra Lahiri
- Deerghoi Paul as Arna
- Debottam Majumder as Arjun Sen
- Palash Ganguly / Rajiv Bose as Ranjit Mukherjee a.k.a. Ranju
- Pijush Ganguly as Bob Sen / Bhobananda
- Malabika Sen as Malobika Sen
- Sagarika Roy as Chitrangada Basu
- Supriyo Dutta as Sadashiv
- Boni Mukherjee as Kalam
- Pushpendu Roy as Dighi's Fiancé
- Sanchari Mondal as Shruti; Ranju's Ex-fiancé
- Debraj Mukherjee as Debdutta Lahiri
- Sayantani Majumdar as Debdutta's Fiancé
- Raja Datta as Monty
- Lopamudra Sinha as Kamli
- Ishani Das as Nayana
- Misty Das as Jhil's friend
- Uma Bardhan as Kalam's mother
- Vikramjit Chowdhury as Neel Roy
- Kanchana Moitra as Rotee Roy
- Raja Chatterjee as Agnidev Roy
- Paean Sarkar as Roosha
- Amitava Bhattacharyya as Doctor
- Monika Dey as Asmani Roy
