= Blues Productions =

Indian film production company

- Industry: Entertainment
- Founded: 2006
- Founder: Snehasish Chakraborty; Debashish Chakraborty
- Headquarters: Kolkata, India
- Key people: Snehasish Chakraborty
- Products: Television programs, Motion Pictures

Blues Productions is an Indian Bengali-language television serial and film production company based in Kolkata, incorporated on 2006. Blues Productions Pvt Ltd has 2 Creative Directors/Key Management Personnel - Snehasish Chakraborty and Debasish Chakraborty.

== Current TV shows ==
Show	Channel	Premiere date
Parashuram – Ajker Nayok	Star Jalsha	10 March 2025
Professor Bidya Banerjee	Star Jalsha	17 November 2025
Tilottoma	Star Jalsha	27 July 2026

== Film productions ==
- Promotion (Bengali) (2013)

== Former TV shows ==
Production Year(s)	Title	Network	Genre	First aired	Last aired	Episode Count	Language
2005–2009	Krishnakoli Tarei Boli	ETV Bangla	Drama	2005	2009	unavailable	Bengali
2006–2009	Kokhono Megh Kokhono Brishti	ETV Bangla	Drama	2006	2009	unavailable	Bengali
2009–2013	Sholo Aana	ETV Bangla	Family Drama Romance	10 August 2009	15 June 2013	1,205	Bengali
2010–2014	@Bhalobasha.com	Star Jalsha	Drama Romance	31 May 2010	22 March 2014	1,201	Bengali
2011–2012	Badhua	Ruposhi Bangla	Drama	2011	2012	unavailable	Bengali
2011–2013	Tapur Tupur	Star Jalsha	Drama Family	14 February 2011	2 November 2013	860	Bengali
2011–2012	Bindi	Sananda TV	Drama	25 July 2011	2012 ki	unavailable	Bengali
2011–2012	Ta Bole Ki Prem Debo Na	Sananda TV	Drama	2011	2012	unavailable	Bengali
2012–2014	Aanchol	Star Jalsha	Drama Comedy Romance	18 June 2012	8 November 2014	752	Bengali
2012–2013	Annapurna	ETV Bangla	Drama Family	1 October 2012	2013	unavailable	Bengali
2013–2014	Kache Aye Shoi	Zee Bangla	Drama	29 April 2013	26 April 2014	308	Bengali
2014–2016	Tumi Robe Nirobe	Zee Bangla	Romance	15 December 2014	16 January 2016	347	Bengali
2016–2017	Bene Bou	Colors Bangla	Drama Romance	18 April 2016	24 June 2017	371	Bengali
2016–2018	Khokababu	Star Jalsha	Drama Romance	9 May 2016	26 July 2018	805	Bengali
2016–2017	Jarowar Jhumko	Zee Bangla	Drama	22 August 2016	26 November 2017	420	Bengali
2016–2017	Pita	Colors Bangla	Drama	17 October 2016	1 May 2017	168	Bengali
2016–2019	Rakhi Bandhan	Star Jalsha	Drama	28 November 2016	3 February 2019	787	Bengali
2016–2018	Stree	Zee Bangla	Drama Comedy Romance	26 December 2016	11 February 2018	409	Bengali
2017	Bikele Bhorer Phool	Zee Bangla	Romance	27 February 2017	1 December 2017	235	Bengali
2017–2018	Bhojo Gobindo	Star Jalsha	Drama	29 May 2017	8 December 2018	539	Bengali
2017–2018	Baksho Bodol	Zee Bangla	Drama	24 July 2017	7 January 2018	164	Bengali
2017–2018	Adorini	Star Jalsha	Drama	4 September 2017	18 March 2018	194	Bengali
2018	Jai Kanhaiya Lal ki	Star Bharat	Drama	1 January 2018	28 May 2018	137	Hindi
2018–2019	Tekka Raja Badshah	Star Jalsha	Drama Comedy Romance	16 July 2018	17 March 2019	237	Bengali
2018–2020	Hriday Haran B.A Pass	Zee Bangla	Drama Comedy Romance	13 August 2018	5 January 2020	495	Bengali
2019	Keshav	Sun Bangla	Drama	3 February 2019	24 November 2019	295	Bengali
2019–2020	Kanak Kakon	Colors Bangla	Drama	15 April 2019	21 March 2020	294	Bengali
2019–2020	Koler Bou	Star Jalsha	Drama Romance	27 May 2019	24 January 2020	185	Bengali
2019–2020	Kone Bou	Sun Bangla	Drama	23 September 2019	6 December 2020	434	Bengali
2020–2022	Jamuna Dhaki	Zee Bangla	Drama Romance Revenge	13 July 2020	1 July 2022	675	Bengali
2020–2022	Jibon Saathi	Zee Bangla	Drama	5 October 2020	4 March 2022	409	Bengali
2020–2022	Khelaghor	Star Jalsha	Drama Romance Action	30 November 2020	4 September 2022	628	Bengali
2020–2022	Gangaram	Star Jalsha	Comedy Musical Romance	28 December 2020	15 July 2022	402	Bengali
2021–2022	Boron	Star Jalsha	Drama Romance	5 April 2021	20 March 2022	348	Bengali
2021–2022	Sarbojaya	Zee Bangla	Drama	9 August 2021	14 May 2022	241	Bengali
2021–2022	Teen Shaktir Aadhar - Trishul	Colors Bangla	Drama Feminism	30 August 2021	10 July 2022	321	Bengali
2021–2022	Khukumoni Home Delivery	Star Jalsha	Drama Romance	1 November 2021	1 May 2022	180	Bengali
2022	Madhabilata	Star Jalsha	Drama Romance	22 August 2022	4 December 2022	109	Bengali
2022–2025	Jagaddhatri	Zee Bangla	Drama Romance Thriller Crime	29 August 2022	14 December 2025	1,201	Bengali
2023	Nayika No.1	Colors Bangla	Drama Comedy Romance	6 March 2023	2 December 2023	272	Bengali
2023	Mukut	Zee Bangla	Drama	27 March 2023	22 September 2023	130	Bengali
2024	Jogomaya	Zee Bangla	Drama Romance Thriller	11 March 2024	5 July 2024	107	Bengali
2023–2025	Geeta LL.B	Star Jalsha	Courtroom Drama Romance Thriller Action	20 November 2023	2 October 2025	677	Bengali
2024–2026	Advocate Anjali Awasthi	StarPlus	Courtroom Drama Romance Thriller Action	8 August 2024	31 May 2026	655	Hindi
2025	Sholok Saree	Sun Bangla	Drama Romance	10 February 2025	23 November 2025	278	Bengali
2025–2026	Besh Korechi Prem Korechi	Zee Bangla	Drama Romance Thriller	8 December 2025	12 April 2026	121	Bengali
2026	Mr. And Mrs. Parshuram	StarPlus	Drama Romance Thriller Action	3 February 2026	18 August 2026	195	Hindi
