= Jagaddhatri (TV series) =

Indian Bengali language TV series

- Genre: Drama; Romance; Thriller; Crime
- Created by: Blues Productions
- Written by: Dialogues; Snehasish Chakraborty
- Directed by: Argha Paik
- Starring: See below
- Country of origin: India
- Original language: Bengali
- No. of episodes: 1201

Production
- Executive producers: Runa Dey Sarkar; Priyabrata Bhattacharya (Blues Productions); Paromita & Aditi (Zee Bangla)
- Producer: Snehasish Chakraborty
- Production location: Kolkata
- Cinematography: Kartik Das
- Editors: Bapon Pramanik; Kunal Banerjee
- Camera setup: Multi-camera
- Running time: 20 minutes
- Production company: Blues Productions

Original release
- Network: Zee Bangla
- Release: 29 August 2022 – 14 December 2025

Jagaddhatri is an Indian Bengali language Romantic Thriller Drama television series that premiered from 29 August 2022 to 14 December 2025 on Zee Bangla. One of the longest running Bengali television soap opera, the show is produced by Snehasish Chakraborty of Blues Productions and stars Ankita Mallick and Soumyadeep Mukherjee in lead roles.

== Plot ==
The story revolves around a girl named Jagaddhatri and an orphan boy, Swayambhu, who are both friends and crime-fighting officers. Jagaddhatri is a secret crime branch officer, but only Koushiki, Kakon and Utsav know her real real identity. Later, Swayambhu and Jagadhatri get married.

== Cast ==
=== Main ===
- Ankita Mallick in a dual role:
  - Jagaddhatri Mukherjee (née Sanyal) aka Jess: Dev's daughter.
  - Durga Mukherjee: Swayambhu's & Jagaddhatri's daughter.
- Soumyadeep Mukherjee as Swayambhu Mukherjee: Jagadhatri's husband, Durga's father
- Rishav Bhowmik as Rishav Maitra

=== Recurring ===
- Rupsha Chakraborty as Kaushiki Mukherjee
- Priyantika Arohi Mukherjee as Kakon Chatterjee
  - Devangana Fozdar Gungun as child Kakon Chatterjee aka Angel
- Arka Chakraborty as Utsav Mukherjee
- Sanchari Das / Ritu Rai Acharya as Mehendi Mukherjee (née Sanyal)
- Moumita Gupta as Boidehi Mukherjee (née Chatterjee)
- Supriyo Dutta as Rajnath Mukherjee aka Raju
- Tapashi Roy Chowdhury as Bhargabi Mukherjee
- Manishankar Banerjee as Dibanath Mukherjee aka Diba
- Ashim Mukhopadhyay as Chandranath Mukherjee aka Chaadu aka Chaadbodon
- Rupsha Chatterjee as Gorima Mukherjee
- Prarona Bhattacharya as Sangvi Laha (née Mukherjee)
- Twarita Chatterjee as Preetilata Ganguly (née Mukherjee) aka Preeti
- Debjoy Mallick as Debu Ganguly aka North Bengal's Debuda
- Kanchana Moitra as Shakuntala Sanyal
- Biplab Banerjee as Deb Sanyal
- Soma Dey as Mahashweta Sanyal
- Shobhana Bhunia as Upasana Ganguly
- Somasree Chaki as Nupur Sanyal
- Roshni Ghosh as Aradhana Ganguly
- Sahamita Acharya as Mouma Sanyal
- Aditya Chowdhury as Samaresh Chatterjee
- Satyam Majumdar as Sadhu Batobyal
- Gourab Ghoshal as Menan
- Sougata Dasgupta as Gunjon
- Priya Paul as Divya Sen
- Sukanya Chatterjee as Shoirindri
- Subhajit Banerjee as Inspector Aditya Bagchi
- Amitava Das as Pritam Laha
- Meghna Mukherjee as Pritam's wife
- Raja Kundu as Shambo Laha
- Bhaskar Banerjee as Ramkinkor Laha
- Sonali Chatterjee as Anjana Laha
- Suravi Sanyal as Shalini Laha
- Monalisa Das as Lekha
- Achitya Kumar Maitra as Lekha's grandfather
- Aditya Roy as Vedchandra Basu
- Susmita Roy Chakraborty as Subhadra Basu
- Siddhartha Ghosh as Sourandra
- Sayantani Majumder as Simantini
- Nandini Saha as Tinni Chatterjee
- Taniya Paul as Deepika Chatterjee
- Subhojit Bakshi as Berandra
- Ananya Biswas as Nuri Nayak
- Srideep Bhattacharjee as Siddhartha aka Dodo
- Koushiki Paul as Darpana Ganguly
- Niladri Lahiri as Dipranjan Ganguly
- Payel Sarkar as Payel
- Madhumita Chakrabarty as Madhumita
- Kaushiki Basu as Kalpona
- Akash Ghosh as Lilliput
- Pallab Chakraborty as Tarun Tirtha Tolapatra aka Double T
- Kaustuv Sengupta as Tushar Tirtha Tolapatra aka Triple T
- Meghna Halder as Barsha Kaul
- Joy Badlani as Guru Sharma
- Indrani Dutta as
  - Late Mohini Roy Chowdhury
  - Mallika Roy Chowdhury
- Suparna Patra as Jayanti
- Pradip Dhar as Kalipod Roy Chowdhury aka Karali
- Sujan Neel Mukherjee as Upal Maitra
- Debolina Dutta as Bijaylakshmi Ghosh
- Mahua Halder as Anindita Sarkar
- Shambhavi Mukherjee as Ashmita Sarkar
- Arunava Dutta as Bilas Sarkar
- Kalyani Mondal as Kalyani Sarkar
- Rupsa Chatterjee as Pramita Basu aka Fake Banolata Chakraborty
- Aritra Goswami as Late Dipan Basu
- Tridip Hazra as Chiranjeet
- Priyanka Chakraborty as Late Banolata Chakraborty aka Fake Pramita Basu
- Subha Ranjan Mukherjee as Uttiyo Mukherjee
- Maitreyee Mitra as Kakoli
- Arpita Dutta Chowdhury as Bipasha
- Sandip Chakraborty as Bhaskar
- Jina Tarafder as Jiya
- Diya Ghosh as Diya
- Samm Bhattacharya as Kakoli's assistant
- Ekta Ganguly as Mala Chatterjee
- Upasana Saha as Pritha Ganguly
- Sutapa Banerjee as Dr. Sreemoti Sen
- Sayanta Modak as Sankolpo Sen
- Sayan Karmakar as Barun Das aka Babin Khan
- Subrata Mitra as Sanjit Banerjee
- Tapasya Dasgupta as Nibedita Maitra
- Rajib Banerjee as Dr. Rajib
- Madhurima Paul as Krithika
- Madhurima Mukherjee as Rimli

=== Guest appearance ===
- Saswata Chatterjee as Animesh Dutta from Abar Proloy

== Adaptations ==
Language	Title	Original release	Network(s)	Last aired	Notes	Ref.
Bengali	Jagaddhatri জগদ্ধাত্রী	29 August 2022	Zee Bangla	14 December 2025	Original	
Telugu	Jagadhatri జగద్ధాత్రి	21 August 2023	Zee Telugu	Ongoing	Remake	
Punjabi	Sehajveer ਸਹਿਜਵੀਰ	25 March 2024	Zee Punjabi	31 May 2025	Remake	
Tamil	Ayali அயலி	2 June 2025	Zee Tamil	Ongoing	Remake	
Marathi	Taarini तारिणी	11 August 2025	Zee Marathi	Ongoing	Remake	
Hindi	Jagadhatri जगद्धात्री	10 November 2025	Zee TV	27 November 2026	Remake	
Malayalam	Durga ദുർഗ്ഗ	17 November 2025	Zee Keralam	Ongoing	Remake	
Kannada	Jagaddhatri ಜಗದ್ಧಾತ್ರಿ	28 September 2026	Zee Kannada	Ongoing	Remake	
