= List of Elle India cover models =

This list of Elle India cover models (1996–present) is a catalog of cover models who have appeared on the cover of Elle India, the Indian edition of French lifestyle magazine Elle.

== 1996–1997 ==
Month	Cover model	Notes
December 1996		
January 1997		
February		
March		
April		
May		
June		
July		
August		
September		
October		
November		
December		

== 1998 ==
Month	Cover model	Notes
January		
February		
March		
April		
May		
June		
July		
August	Shahrukh Khan	
September		
October		
November		
December		

== 1999 ==
Month	Cover model(s)	Notes
January	Viveka Babajee	
February	Bipasha Basu & Dino Morea	
March	Karisma Kapoor	
April		
May	Malaika Arora Khan	
June		
July		
August	Pregnant model.	
September		
October		
November		
December	3 models.	3rd Anniversary Issue.

== 2000 ==
Month	Cover model(s)	Notes
January	Aishwarya Rai	
February		
March		
April		
May		
June	Bipasha Basu & John Abraham	
July		
August	Sushmita Sen	
September		
October	Ujjwala Raut	
November		
December	Female model & Shahrukh Khan	4th Anniversary Issue.

== 2001 ==
Month	Cover model(s)	Notes
January	Britney Spears	
February	Nina Manuel	
March		
April	Udita Goswami	
May	Riya Sen	
June		
July	Aishwarya Rai	
August		
September	Tabu	
October	Ujjwala Raut	
November		
December		5th Anniversary Issue. Designer Special.

== 2002 ==
Month	Cover model(s)	Notes
January		
February	Riya Sen	
March	Yana Gupta	
April	Nina Manuel	
May		
June	Sameera Reddy	
July	Ujjwala Raut	
August	Shivani Kapoor	
September	Sapna Kumar	
October	Dipannita Sharma	
November		
December	Kareena Kapoor	6th Anniversary Issue.

== 2003 ==
Month	Cover model(s)	Notes
January		
February		
March	Jennifer Lopez	
April	Lakshmi Menon	
May		
June		
July	Malaika Arora Khan	
August	Rekha	
September	Preity Zinta	
October	Ujjwala Raut	
November	Udita Goswami	
December	Dannii Minogue	7th Anniversary Issue.

== 2004 ==
Month	Cover model(s)	Notes
January	Beyoncé	
February		
March	Yana Gupta	
April	Charlize Theron	
May	Anoushka Shankar	
June		
July	Sushmita Sen	
August	Soha Ali Khan	
September	Kylie Minogue	
October	Bipasha Basu	
November	Katrina Kaif	
December		8th Anniversary Issue.

== 2005 ==
Month	Cover model(s)	Notes
January	Saira Mohan	
February	Elizabeth Jagger	
March		
April		
May	Sonalika Sahay	
June	Deepika Padukone	
July	2 models	
August	Monikangana Dutta	
September	Mallika Sherawat	
October	Bipasha Basu	
November	Eva Longoria	
December	Linda Evangelista	9th Anniversary Issue.

== 2006 ==
Month	Cover model(s)	Notes
January	Neha Kapur	
February	Priyanka Chopra	
March	Madonna	
April	Monikangana Dutta	
May		
June	Ujjwala Raut	
July	Neha Kapur	
August	Keira Knightley	
September	Sapna Kumar	
October	Kareena Kapoor	
November		
December	Ujjwala Raut	10th Anniversary Issue.

== 2007 ==
Month	Cover model(s)	Notes
January	Elettra Rossellini Wiedemann	
February		
March	Kylie Minogue	
April		
May	Ujjwala Raut	
June	Monikangana Dutta	
July	Tamara Moss	
August	Natasha Gilbert	
September	Deepika Padukone	
October		
November	Monikangana Dutta	
December	Diana Penty	11th Anniversary Issue.

== 2008 ==
Month	Cover model(s)	Notes
January	Melissa Mehra	
February	Sonalika Sahay	
March	Mia Uyeda	
April		
May	Lisa Haydon	
June	Madonna	
July		
August	Sonam Kapoor	
September	Priyanka Chopra	
October	Gabriella Wright	
November	Lakshmi Menon	
December	Deepika Padukone	12 Fabulous Years of Fashion. The Anniversary Issue.

== 2009 ==
Month	Cover model(s)	Notes
January	Bojana Tatarska	
February	Tamara Moss	
March	Sonam Kapoor	
April	Lisa Haydon	
May	Kareena Kapoor	
June	Diana Penty	
July	Megan Fox	
August	Katrina Kaif	
September	Jyothsna Chakravarthy	
October	Giselli Monteiro	
November	Lara Dutta	
December	Smita Lasrado, Jyothsna Chakravarthy, Rebecca Tyagi	13th Anniversary Special.

== 2010 ==
Month	Cover model(s)	Notes
January	Shruti Haasan	
February	Freida Pinto	
March	Lady Gaga	
April	Lakshmi Menon	
May	Lisa Haydon	
June	Tamara Moss	
July	Genelia D'Souza	
August	Sonam Kapoor	
September	Diana Penty	
October	Lisa Ray	
November	Sonia Dara & Sendhil Ramamurthy	
December	Aishwarya Rai Bachchan	14th Anniversary Issue.

== 2011 ==
Month	Cover model(s)	Notes
January	Shraddha Kapoor	
February	Nidhi Sunil & Nicole Faria	
March	Maddison McKay	
April	Lisa Haydon	
May	Angela Jonsson	
June	Tamara Moss	
July	Deepika Padukone	
August	Rosie Huntington-Whiteley	
September	Katrina Kaif	
October	Kim Johnson	
November	Jyothsna Chakravarthy	
December	Shreiyah Sabharwal & 2 other models	15th Anniversary Issue.

== 2012 ==
Month	Cover model(s)	Notes
January	Ashika Pratt	
February	Lady Gaga	
March	Sonam Kapoor	
April	Kanishtha Dhankar & Erika Packard	
May	Nargis Fakhri	
June	Jyothsna Chakravarthy	
July	Ninja Singh	
August	Lisa Haydon	
September	Jacqueline Fernandez	
October	Diana Penty	
November	Katy Perry	
December	Kanishtha Dhankhar & Anuj Choudhry	

== 2013 ==
Month	Cover model(s)	Notes
January	Isabelle Farias	
February	Carol Gracias, Bhavna Sharma, Indrani Dasgupta, Sapna Kumar & 1 model	Issue has 2 covers featuring 6 models - 3 on each cover.
March	Anushka Sharma	
April	Kalki Koechlin	
May	Deborah Priya Henry	
June	Rihanna	
July	Rasika Navare & Archana Akhil Kumar	
August	Deepika Padukone	
September	Lakshmi Menon	
October	Sonam Kapoor	
November	Diana Penty	
December	Archana Akhil Kumar	

== 2014 ==
Month	Cover Model(s)	Notes
January	Alia Bhatt	
February	Gia Johnson & Tamara Moss	
March	Freida Pinto	
April	Katheleno Kenze	
May	Esha Gupta	
June	Angelina Jolie	
July	Smita Lasrado	
August	Kiran Rao	
September	Neelam Johal	
October	Shraddha Kapoor	
November	Parineeti Chopra	
December	Sonam Kapoor	

== 2015 ==
Month	Cover Model(s)	Notes
January	Kalki Koechlin	
February	Kim Kardashian	
March	Lisa Haydon	
April	Kanishtha Dhankar	
May	Anushka Sharma	
June	Radhika Nair & Monica Tomas	
July	Twinkle Khanna	
August	Kajol	
September	Pernia Qureshi	
October	Parineeti Chopra	
November	Lakshmi Menon	
December	Alia Bhatt	

== 2016 ==
Month	Cover Model(s)	Notes
January	Jacqueline Fernandez	
February	Kareena Kapoor	
March	Sayani Gupta	
April	Diya Prabhakar	
May	Padma Lakshmi	
June	Diana Penty	
July	Arundhati Roy	
August	Kalki Koechlin	
September	Sonam Kapoor	
October	Anushka Sharma	
November	Alia Bhatt	
December	Deepika Padukone	

== 2017 ==
Month	Cover Model(s)	Notes
January	Vaani Kapoor	
February	Radhika Nair	
March	Kangana Ranaut	
April	Bhumika Arora	
May	Lisa Haydon	
June	Sonakshi Sinha	
July	Ujjwala Raut	
August	Anushka Sharma	
September	Freida Pinto	
October		
November	Jacqueline Fernandez	
December	Alia Bhatt	

== 2018 ==
Month	Cover Model(s)	Notes
January	Sonam Kapoor	
February	Zayn Malik	
March	Priyanka Chopra	
April	Archana Akil Kumar, Malaika Arora, Dipannita Sharma, Ujjwala Raut & Mehr Jesia	
May	Mindy Kaling	
June	Zadie Smith	
July	Aditi Rao Hydari & Rajkummar Rao	
August	Twinkle Khanna	
September	Deepika Padukone	
October	Padmanabh Singh	
November	Anushka Sharma	
December	Oprah Winfrey	

== 2019 ==
Month	Cover Model(s)	Notes
January	Vicky Kaushal	Digital Cover: Naomi Janumala, Tashi Pedy, Namita
February	Alia Bhatt & Karan Johar	
March	Sonam Kapoor	
April	Ananya Panday	
May	Katrina Kaif	
June	Naomi Scott	
July	Kangana Ranaut	Digital Cover: Sonakshi Sinha
August	Taapsee Pannu	
September	Dipti Sharma, Ishaan Khatter, Sara Ali Khan, Jasprit Bumrah	Four different covers
October	Kareena Kapoor	
November		
December		

== 2022 ==
Month	Cover Model(s)	Notes
January		
February		
March		
April		
May		
June		
July		
August	Masaba Gupta & Zahan Kapoor	
September		
October		
November		
December		
