= List of people on the cover of FHM India =

This list of people on the cover of FHM magazine 2007–present is a catalog of women who have appeared on the cover of the Indian edition of FHM magazine, starting with the magazine's inaugural issue in October 2007.

== 2007 ==
Month	Cover girl	Other notes
October	Ujjwala Raut	Launch issue.
November		
December		

== 2008 ==
Month	Cover model	Other notes
January	Bruna Abdullah	
February	Kareena Kapoor	
March	Padma Lakshmi	
April	Bipasha Basu	
May	Nina Manuel	
June	Katrina Kaif	
July	Lara Dutta	
August	Vidya Balan	
September	Urvashi Sharma & Nethra Raghuraman	First cover to feature more than one cover girl.
October	Olga Kurylenko	
November	Genelia D'Souza	1st Anniversary Issue.
December	Eesha Koppikar	

== 2009 ==
Month	Cover girl	Other notes
January	Mugdha Godse	
February	Deepika Padukone	
March	Priyanka Chopra	
April	Kangana Ranaut	
May	Kareena Kapoor	First cover girl to appear twice.
June	Katrina Kaif	
July	Neha Dhupia	
August	Deepika Padukone	First and only cover girl to appear twice in one year.
September	Shruti Haasan	
October	Maria Sharapova	
November	Asin	2nd Anniversary Special.
December	Jacqueline Fernandez	

== 2010 ==
Month	Cover girl	Other notes
January	Amrita Rao	
February	Nandana Sen	
March	Bipasha Basu	
April	Minissha Lamba	
May	Raima Sen	
June/July	Deepika Padukone	First cover girl to appear thrice.
August	Lisa Haydon	
September	Yardthip Rajpal	
October	Lara Dutta	
November	Vidya Balan	
December	Monikangana Dutta	

== 2011 ==
Month	Cover girl	Other notes
January	Ileana D'Cruz	
February	Shruti Haasan	
March	Sonam Kapoor	
April	Mallika Sherawat	
May	Yana Gupta	
June	Katrina Kaif	
July	Neha Dhupia	
August	Kalki Koechlin	
September	Kajal Agarwal	
October	Malaika Arora Khan	
November	Sonakshi Sinha	4th Anniversary Issue.
December	Veena Malik	

== 2012 ==
Month	Cover girl	Other notes
January	Chitrangda Singh	
February	Dia Mirza	
March	Vidya Balan	
April	Nargis Fakhri	
May	Sunny Leone	
June	Soha Ali Khan	
July	Katrina Kaif	First cover girl to appear 4 times.
August	Anushka Sharma	
September	Huma Qureshi	
October	Kelly Brook	
November	Deepika Padukone	Fifth Anniversary Special.
December	Aditi Rao Hydari	

== 2013 ==
Month	Cover girl	Other notes
January	Jacqueline Fernandez	
February	Neha Dhupia	
March	Sara Loren	
April	Karishma Kotak	
May	Shraddha Kapoor	
June	Richa Chadda	
July	Nargis Fakhri	
August	Prachi Desai	
September	Katrina Kaif	First cover girl to appear 5 times.
October	Sarah Jane Dias	
November	Nicole Scherzinger	
December	Chitrangada Singh	

== 2014 ==
Month	Cover Model(s)	Other notes
January	Vaani Kapoor	
February	Shruti Haasan	
March	Monica Dogra	
April	Ginevra Leggeri, Suzana Rodrigues & Azura Vandenberg	First cover to feature 3 cover girls.
May	Neha Dhupia	
June	Yami Gautam	
July	Deepika Padukone	
August	Neha Sharma	
September	Pooja Misrra	
October	Bruna Abdullah	
November	Esha Gupta	
December	Richa Chadda	

== 2015 ==
Month	Cover Model(s)	Other notes
January–February	Ranveer Singh	
March	Evelyn Sharma	
April	Amy Willerton	
May	Lisa Haydon	
June	Varun Dhawan	
July	Shruti Haasan	
August	Aditi Rao Hydari	
September	Malaika Arora Khan	
October	Amy Jackson	
November	Ashley Roberts	
December	Deepika Padukone	

== 2016 ==
Month	Cover Model(s)	Other notes
February	Ameesha Patel	Oldest Winner
March	Parineeti Chopra	
April	Waluscha De Sousa	
May	Radhika Apte	
June	Chitrangada Singh	
July	Amisha Patel	
August	Urvashi Rautela	
September	Neha Sharma	
October	Emraan Hashmi	
November	Arjun Kapoor	
December	Yuvraj Singh	

== 2017 ==
Month	Cover Model(s)	Other notes
January–February	Taapsee Pannu	
March–April	Jacqueline Fernandez	
May	Disha Patani	
June–July	Kriti Sanon	
August	Amy Jackson	
September–October	Sunny Leone	
November	Kiara Advani	

== 2018 ==
Month	Cover Model(s)	Other notes
January	Richa Chadda	
February - March	Urvashi Rautela	
May - June	Athiya Shetty	
July	Isabel Blancart	
August - September	Elena Fernandes	
October	Saiyami Kher	
November	Rakul Preet Singh	
December	Yami Gautam	

== 2019 ==
Month	Cover Model(s)	Other notes
January	Swara Bhaskar	
February	Kriti Sanon, Karthik Aaryan	
March	Kiara Advani	
April - May	Rhea Chakraborty	
June	Urvashi Rautela	
July	Tamannaah	
August	Nushrat Bharucha	
September	TBD	
October	TBD	
November	TBD	
December	TBD	
