= List of Grazia India cover models =

This list is a catalog of women who have appeared on the cover of the Grazia India magazine, starting with the magazine's first issue in April 2008.

== 2008 ==
Month	Cover model(s)	Notes
April	Bipasha Basu	Launch issue.
May		
June		
July	Sonam Kapoor	
August	Katrina Kaif	
September	Carol Gracias	
October	Deepika Padukone	
November	Mallika Sherawat	
December		

== 2009 ==
Month	Cover model(s)	Notes
January	Lara Dutta	
February	Amrita Arora	
March		
April	Priyanka Chopra	1st Anniversary Special. Issue has 3 split covers all featuring Priyanka.
May	Shilpa Shetty	
June		
July		
August	Kangana Ranaut	
September	Deepika Padukone	
October	Kareena Kapoor	
November	Asin	
December	Jacqueline Fernandez	

== 2010 ==
Month	Cover model(s)	Notes
January		
February	Twinkle Khanna	
March	Preity Zinta	
April	Sonam Kapoor	2nd Anniversary Special.
May		
June	2 random models	
July	Neha Dhupia	
August	Kangana Ranaut	
September	Diana Penty	
October	Asin	
November	Monikangana Dutta	
December	Tamara Moss	

== 2011 ==
Month	Cover model(s)	Notes
January	Genelia D'Souza	
February	Deepika Padukone	
March	Liza Golden, Nidhi Sunil, Arshia Ahuja	
April	Kareena Kapoor	Third Anniversary Special.
May	Lara Dutta	
June	Angela Jonsson	
July	Kanishtha Dhankar	
August	Lisa Haydon	
September	Anushka Sharma	
October	Freida Pinto	
November	Kalki Koechlin	
December	Nargis Fakhri	

== 2012 ==
Month	Cover model(s)	Notes
January	Esha Gupta	
February	Jacqueline Fernandez	
March	Jyothsna Chakravarthy	
April	Deepika Padukone	4th Anniversary Special.
May	Rachel Bayros & Tamara Moss	
June	Kangana Ranaut	
July	Monica Dogra	
August	Parineeti Chopra	
September	Nidhi Sunil	
October	Lakshmi Menon	
November	Sonam Kapoor	
December	Alia Bhatt	

== 2013 ==
Month	Cover model(s)	Notes
January	Ankita Shorey	
February	Diana Penty	
March	Angela Jonsson	First and only underwater cover.
April	Freida Pinto	
May	Anushka Sharma	
June	Salome Polaki	
July	Chitrangada Singh	
August	Archana Akhil Kumar	
September	Shraddha Kapoor	
October	Shruti Haasan	
November	Sonakshi Sinha	
December	Kareena Kapoor Khan	

== 2014 ==
Month	Cover Model(s)	Notes
January	Sahar Biniaz	
February	Ileana D'Cruz	
March	Kalki Koechlin	
April	Sonam Kapoor	
May	Ketholeno Kense	
June	Lisa Haydon	
July	Esha Gupta	
August	Kangana Ranaut	
September	Jacqueline Fernandez	
October		
November	Shraddha Kapoor	
December	Priyanka Chopra	

== 2015 ==
Month	Cover Model(s)	Notes
January		
February		
March	Ashwati Ramesh	
April		
May		
June		
July		
August		
September		
October		
November		
December		
