= Kingfisher Calendar =

Indian annual calendar 2003–2021

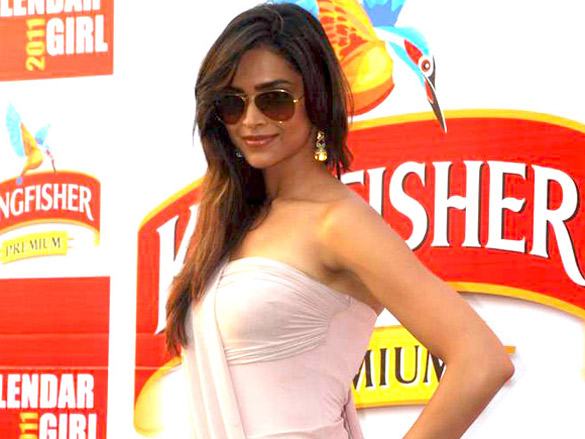
Deepika Padukone, herself a Kingfisher Calendar Girl of 2006, at the launch of the calendar in 2011.

The Kingfisher Calendar was an annual calendar featuring models in swimsuits published by the Indian conglomerate United Breweries Group for 19 years from 2003 to 2021. Described by Rediff as "arguably the most prestigious modelling assignment in India", it was credited with advancing the careers of models and actresses like Katrina Kaif, Deepika Padukone, Yana Gupta, Sonali Raut, Ujjwala Raut, Nargis Fakhri, Bruna Abdullah, Deepti Gujral, Lisa Haydon, Aishwarya Sushmita and Angela Jonsson. Photographer Atul Kasbekar has been associated with the calendar since its inception in 2003 till its final issue in 2021. Kasbekar along with Vijay Mallya are credited with the idea of creating the annual Kingfisher Calendar.

== Photographers, locations, models and production ==
Year	Photographer	Location	Models
2003	Atul Kasbekar	Mauritius	Shivani Kapur, Ujjwala Raut, Vidisha Pavate, Yana Gupta and Katrina Kaif
2004	Atul Kasbekar	Thailand	Yana Gupta, Nifa Hindes, Pia Trivedi, Vidisha Pavate and Rohini Tiwari
2005	Atul Kasbekar	South Africa	Yana Gupta, Cindy Burbridge, Asha Leo, Pia Trivedi and Sheetal Menon
2006	Atul Kasbekar	Australia	Deepika Padukone, Shruti Agrawal, Karishma Kotak, Neelam Chauhan, Shilpa Reddy and Mashoom Singha
2007	Atul Kasbekar	French Riviera, France	Bruna Abdullah, Mia Uyeda, Nikii Daas, Deepti Gujral, Shamita Singha and Selma Lasrado
2008	Atul Kasbekar	Goa, Andaman, Ladakh and Udaipur, India	Deepti Gujral, Preeti Desai, Sheetal Menon, Monikagana Dutta, Shruti Agrawal, Melissa Mehra and Tamara Moss
2009	Atul Kasbekar	Islands on the Andaman Sea	Monikana Dutta, Nargis Fakhri, Mimi Blix, Tamara Moss, Katya Melnikova and Sunisa Jongsawat
2010	Atul Kasbekar	Maldives	Esha Gupta, Gia Johnson-Singh, Ashika Pratt, Himarsha Venkatsamy, Anjali Lavania and Sonali Raut
2011	Atul Kasbekar	Mauritius	Fiona Thomas, Angela Jonsson, Lisa Haydon, Anjali Lavania, Cherlotte Lohmann and Lisa Golden
2012	Atul Kasbekar	Negombo, Sri Lanka	Tina Desai, Angela Jonsson, Maia Haydon, Mimi Blix, Saiyami Kher, and Nathalia Kaur
2013	Atul Kasbekar	South Africa	Kanishtha Dhankar, Elena Fernandes, Nevena Pejatovic, Priya Emmanuel and Kyra Dutt
2014	Atul Kasbekar	Boracay, Philippines	Nicole Faria, Rochelle Rao, Rikee Chatterjee, Ketheleno Kenze, Sobhita Dhulipala and Sahar Biniaz
2015	Atul Kasbekar	Turkey	Sarah Jane Dias, Keisha Lall, Dayana Erappa, Elena Fernandes and Aastha Pokharel
2016	Atul Kasbekar	Seychelles	Aisha Sharma, Aishwarya Sushmita, Maya Hendricks, Noyonita Lodh and Sushrii Shreya Mishraa
2017	Atul Kasbekar	Mykonos, Greece	Vartika Singh, Meenakshi Rathore, Dayana Erappa, Kanishtha Dhankar, Alliny Gomes, Helena Gomes and Nora Fatehi
2018	Atul Kasbekar	Croatia	Priyanka Moodley, Ishika Sharma, Priyanka Karunakaran and Mitali Rannorey
2019	Atul Kasbekar	Sardinia, Italy	Sushrii Shreya Mishraa, Shubra Aiyappa, Madusha Mayadunne and Diva Dhawan
2020	Atul Kasbekar	Western Cape, South Africa	Aditi Arya, Zoya Afroz, Pooja Chopra and Aishwarya Sushmita
2021	Atul Kasbekar	Kerala, India	Gehna Mahiarya, Krithika Babu, Adline Castelino, Sumita Bhandari and Anukreethy Vas

== Kingfisher Calendar Model Hunt ==
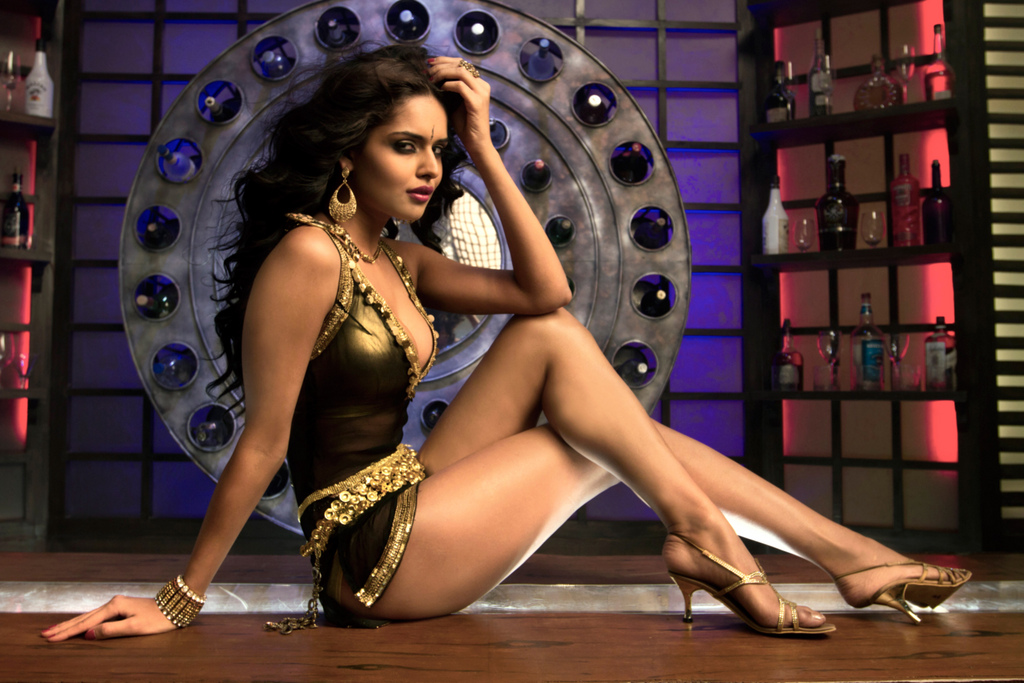
Nathalia Kaur, winner of the Kingfisher Calendar Model Hunt 2012

The Kingfisher Calendar Model Hunt, now known as Kingfisher Supermodels is an annual competition to select a model for the annual calendar. Started in 2010, the competition has been televised by NDTV Good Times. The format includes competing 10 women in a reality show across 13 episodes.

=== Winners ===
- 2010 – Himarsha Venkatsamy
- 2011 – Angela Jonsson
- 2012 – Nathalia Kaur
- 2013 – Nevena Pejatovic
- 2014 – Ketholeno Kense
- 2015 – Aastha Pokharel
- 2016 – Aishwarya Sushmita

== In popular culture ==
There is a 2015 Hindi film called Calendar Girls based on the Kingfisher Calendar phenomenon.

== See also ==
- India's Next Top Model
- Pirelli Calendar
