= Delhi Photo Festival =

Biennial photography festival in Delhi, India

- Genre: photography festival
- Date: 30 October – 8 November 2015
- Frequency: biennale
- Locations: Indira Gandhi National Centre for the Arts (IGNCA), 2015
- Years active: 2011 - 2015
- Founder: Nazar Foundation
- Area: worldwide
- Organiser: Nazar Foundation
- People: Prashant Panjiar, Dinesh Khanna
- Website: www.delhiphotofestival.com

Delhi Photo Festival is a biennial photography festival organised by the Nazar Foundation in Delhi. The third edition of DPF held from 30 October to 8 November 2015. The festival was held in Indira Gandhi National Centre for the Arts (IGNCA)

The Delhi Photo Festival was started in 2011, curated by photographers Prashant Panjiar and Dinesh Khanna under the aegis of the Nazar Foundation.

The Nazar Foundation is the owner and parent body of the Delhi Photo Festival. The first two editions of the Delhi Photo Festival were in partnership with the India Habitat Centre and were hosted at the IHC. However, since early 2015 and onwards, this partnership with the IHC has since been dissolved.

== Delhi Photo Festival 2011 ==
The first Delhi Photo Festival was held from 15 to 28 October at the India Habitat Centre (IHC). Organised by Prashant Panjiar and Dinesh Khanna, photographers and co-founders of the Nazar Foundation, a Delhi-based photography organisation and IHC. Its central exhibition based on the theme "Affinity, emphasising kinships and the movement of the inward gaze" included 35 Indian and 39 international photo portfolios from about 24 countries. It featured works of Kanu Gandhi, who extensively photographed Mahatma Gandhi and Raghu Rai, a veteran photographer, besides talks and workshops by Prabuddha Dasgupta, Raghu Rai, Dayanita Singh, Ketaki Sheth, Swapan Parekh, Ram Rahman, Pablo Bartholomew, Sam Harris, Shahidul Alam, Sohrab Hura, Vidura Jang Bahadur and Nitin Upadhye.

== Delhi Photo Festival 2013 ==
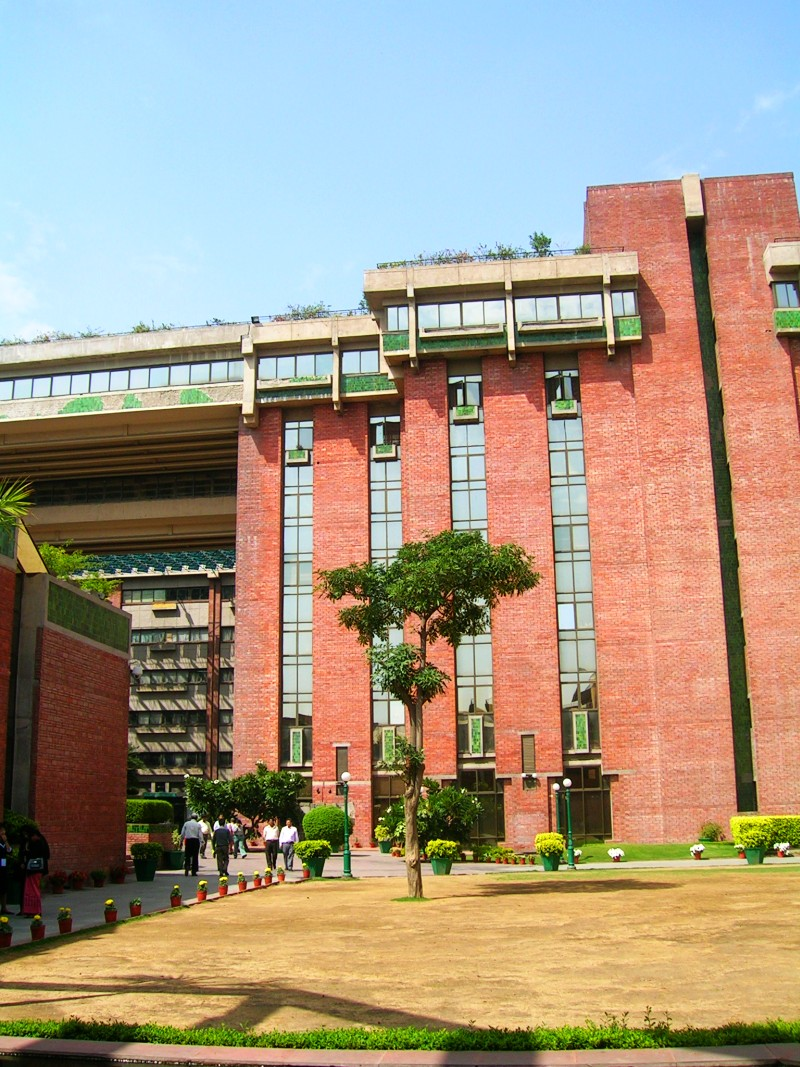
The Festival is held at the various indoors and outdoor exhibition spaces within the India Habitat Center complex.

As a tribute to photographer Prabuddha Dasgupta, who died in 2012, the theme of the 2nd Delhi Photo Festival was chosen as "Grace", inspired by a talk he gave describe his Longing series during the 1st edition of the festival in 2011, "I want to have a long string of images, held together by grace, because grace is that undefineable, non rational, non linear word that I am looking for…." . Based on that theme, 41 photographs and 50 digital exhibits were chosen from over 2,349 worldwide submissions for the theme exhibition. The festival will also host talks, seminars and workshops by Aveek Sen, Sumit Dayal, Munem Wasif and Raghu Rai.

Apart from the venue, around 20 major galleries of Delhi city, including the National Gallery of Modern Art, Galerie Romain Rolland at Alliance Française, Delhi have partnered to host their own independent photography exhibitions during the festival period.

== Delhi Photo Festival 2015 ==
The 2015 edition was held at the Indira Gandhi National Centre for the Arts (IGNCA) from 30 October to 8 November 2015. The third edition's theme was "Aspire".

The program for the year included:

- Print exhibitions and screening of digital exhibitions, films and multimedia at the primary venue, the IGNCA;
- A robust and vibrant Partner Gallery Program across the city;
- Artist talks by leading international and national photo practitioners;
- Seminars, discussions, performances, live demonstrations and events
- An education outreach program through workshops for children, disadvantaged youth and
- A Master Class for the brightest and promising professional photo practitioners
