= Tarun Khiwal =

Indian photographer (born 1965)

- Born: 1965 (age 60–61); Mathura, Uttar Pradesh, India
- Occupation: photographer
- Years active: 1990 – present

Tarun Khiwal (born 1965) is an Indian fashion and commercial photographer. An engineer by education, he left his first job in 1989, and apprenticed with photographers, Hardev Singh, Prabuddha Dasgupta and Atul Kasbekar, before starting out on his own in 1995.

A photographer in the fashion industry, he was awarded the 2005 Hasselblad Masters Award, given by the Hasselblad Foundation, he is the first and only Indian recipient so far of the award. His other awards include, "Fashion Photographer of the Year Award" at the Lycra MTV Style Award and Kingfisher Fashion Photographer of the Year.

== Early life and background ==
Tarun Khiwal was born in Mathura, Uttar Pradesh, and grew up in Lucknow, where his father was an Indian Railways officer. He started taking photographs at age 15, after his father gave him a Pentax K1000 camera. Growing up, he wanted to become a painter, however neither it nor photography was considered financially viable career option by his father, thus ended up studying mechanical engineering at the Institute of Tool Room Training, Lucknow, where he studied for the next four years.

== Career ==
After completing his education, Tarun started his career in early 1989, designing press and die casting tools at West India Power Equipments Pvt. Ltd in Jagdishpur, an industrial town near Lucknow. However, finding him unable to apply himself well at work, even eight months after joining, the technical director of the company, gave him the book,The Magic of Thinking Big to read. The book impacted him deeply. A few days later, he returned the book and also left the job.

Thus, he shifted base to Delhi in November 1989. A few months later, he gained apprenticeship with renowned architectural and interior photographer, Hardev Singh. This was followed by apprenticeships with fashion photographers, Atul Kasbekar and Prabuddha Dasgupta. With the latter, he apprenticed for two years, this left a deep impact of photography, as he later recounted in an interview, " (with Dasgupta) I discarded all the notions I had about photography." In 1995, he started to work independently, initially with magazines like Society and First City. This gradually led to his entry to the fashion industry, over the next few years.

Recognition came to him in 2004, when he was awarded the "Fashion Photographer of the Year Award" at the Lycra MTV Style Award and Kingfisher Fashion Photographer of the Year award, while international recognition came with the Hasselblad Masters Award in 2005, which made him the first and only Indian photographer to win the award.
