= Prabuddha Dasgupta =

Indian photographer

- Born: Prabuddha Dasgupta; 21 September 1956; Kolkata, West Bengal, India
- Died: 12 August 2012 (aged 55); Alibaug, Maharashtra, India
- Occupation: Photographer
- Years active: 1975–2012
- Spouse: Tania Sethi
- Partner: Lakshmi Menon (2000–2012)
- Children: 2 daughters with Tania Sethi
- Parent: Prodosh Dasgupta (father)
- Website: prabuddhadasgupta.com

Prabuddha Dasgupta (21 September 1956 – 12 August 2012) was an Indian fashion and fine-art photographer. Known for his black and white imagery, he worked as a fashion photographer for more than three decades. His books included Women (1996), a collection of portraits and nudes of urban Indian women.

== Biography ==
=== Early life and background ===
Prabuddha Dasgupta was born in Kolkata in September 1956. His father was, Prodosh Das Gupta, a sculptor and curator of the National Gallery of Modern Art (NGMA), Delhi from 1957 to 1970; the family stayed within the premises. In the 1970s, his father moved to Nizamuddin West, an artists' colony in Delhi, where he stayed for most of his career. He graduated in History from Hindu College, University of Delhi (1973–1975).

=== Career ===
Dasgupta started his career as copywriter with the advertising agency Everest, before turning to photography full-time in the late 1980s. During his career as a commercial photographer, which took off with a campaign for Blue Lagoon Jeans, Dasgupta worked with the first generation of Indian supermodels: Madhu Sapre, Feroze Gujral, Shyamolie Verma and Mehr Jesia. According to historian, William Dalrymple, with whom he worked on his book Edge of Faith, "Rohit Khosla and Rohit Bal, along with Dasgupta, invented glamour in India." A self-taught photographer, he received the Yves Saint Laurent grant for photography in 1991, for his photograph of model Feroze Gujral, shot for designer Suneet Varma.

He shot the first advertisements of KamaSutra condoms in 1991, with models Pooja Bedi and Marc Robinson, which not only became popular, but also turned KS into India's top-selling condom brand. Another ad campaign he shot was for 'Tuff Shoes' in 1995, which featured models, Milind Soman and Madhu Sapre.

Dasgupta worked for Vogue, Elle, Harper's Bazaar and GQ. He published several art books of his photographs, including Women (1996), Ladakh (2000) with landscapes of Ladakh, and his 2009 book Edge of Faith authored by William Dalrymple, with portraits of the Catholic community in Goa, was published in 2009. His work has been internationally exhibited, in solo and group shows and is held in the collections at Museo Ken Damy, Brescia (Italy) and Galleria Carla Sozzani, Milan. His first personal show titled, Longing was held in New York in 2007, and was reviewed by The Paris Review. During his career he also mentored "a generation" of photographers, including Tarun Khiwal and Bharat Sikka, who assisted him in the 1990s.

In his later years, Dasgupta moved to Goa. He died in Alibaug near Mumbai, following a heart attack on the way to the airport, after a fashion shoot in Alibaug, age 55. A memorial meeting in his honour was held on 25 August 2013 at NGMA, New Delhi, wherein tributes were paid by Mira Nair, Raghu Rai and Dayanita Singh; the gathering ended with an audio-visual montage of his works.

As a tribute to him, the theme of the 2nd Delhi Photo Festival (2013) was chosen as "Grace", inspired by a talk Dasgupta gave at the 1st edition of the festival in 2011, "I want to have a long string of images, held together by grace, because grace is that undefineable, non-rational, non-linear word that I am looking for…"

== Personal life ==
Dasgupta was married to Tania Sethi till his death. She is a graphic designer who was also his life-long creative collaborator, and with whom he had two daughters. From 2000 till his death in 2012, Dasgupta was in an open polyamourous relationship with model Lakshmi Menon and his wife Tania Sethi.

== Books ==
- Women. Viking, 1996. ISBN 0670867853
- Ladakh, Viking, 2000. ISBN 0670892106.
- Edge of Faith, with William Dalrymple, Seagull Books, 2009. ISBN 1906497311.

== General references ==
- "Profile of Prabuddha Dasgupta on SaffronArt.com"
- "Profile of Prabuddha Dasgupta on Artfacts.net"
