= SDZ =

SDZ may refer to:

- San Diego Zoo
- Serbian Railways, reporting mark SDŽ
- Shankar Dada Zindabad, an Indian film
- Split-Dalmatia County (Croatian: Splitsko-dalmatinska županija), a county in Croatia
- Süddeutsche Zeitung, a German newspaper published in Munich, Bavaria
