= Karishma Kotak =

English model, actress and television presenter (born 1982)

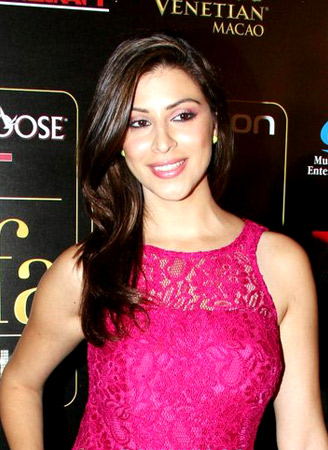
- Kotak in 2013
- Born: 26 May 1982 (age 44); London, England
- Occupations: Model; actress; TV presenter
- Years active: 1998–present
- Known for: Kingfisher Calendar, Bigg Boss 6, IPL 6
- Website: karishmakotak.com

Karishma Kotak is an English model, actress and television presenter.

== Early life ==
Kotak was born on 26 May 1982 in North West London, England. She is of Indian Gujarati descent. Her father is from Gujarat and her mother is from East Africa. Her immediate family lives in London and consists of her mother and a younger brother named Sunny Kotak. She did a part of her schooling from a boarding school. She later pursued a degree in Bachelor of Arts in Advertising and Marketing. Initially, she wanted to become a teacher and had enrolled for a course in teaching.

== Career ==
=== Modelling and advertisements - UK ===
Karishma began her modelling career at the age of 16 and worked for an adult magazine like Just Seventeen and other projects in Essex. When she was around 20, she visited India and realized the huge potential that the Indian fashion had to offer. In the meantime, she continued doing projects and fashion shows in the UK including regional campaigns. She did catalog work for brands like Toni & Guy and FCUK. In 2004, she walked the ramp for the London Fashion Week. She was also a presenter for a UK TV show, The Show, that dealt with entertainment, movies & lifestyle.

=== Modelling and advertisements - India ===
In September 2005, Karishma moved to Mumbai, India. Within 2 months of her relocation, she got selected to work with a calendar published by the United Breweries Group, the 2006 Kingfisher Calendar, which was shot in Australia by Atul Kasbekar. She said in an interview, "Doing the Kingfisher calendar is a dream for any model. All the hours in the gym and eating healthy are paying off." This project shot her into limelight in the Indian fashion scene. She accepted several offers to do TV commercials. A celebrity management company, Matrix India Entertainment commented, "As she has an excellent complexion, she'll be in skin and beauty product ads."

She did TV advertisements & promotional campaigns for brands like Dove, Pond's, Wella Hair Color, Titan Xylus, Diesel, Tanishq, Saffola, Sagar Sarees, Rang Sarees, Alapatt Jewels, Kalyan Silks, Elmore, Achakottil Jewels, CMR Grand, and Sobha Wedding Galaxy As a brand ambassador for Dove, she was featured on huge billboards & hoardings in major cities across India.

In April 2012, her two TV commercials for Idea Cellular with Abhishek Bachchan started airing on TV. Karishma was next hired by VVF Limited for the television advertisement of their bathing soap bar, Jo. The ad was released to small screens in May 2012. In July 2012, her TV commercial with Salman Khan for Relaxo Footwear was released.

She has also appeared in several magazines, including as the cover girl, like Vogue, FHM, Asian Woman, Maxim, OK!, Hello!, Elle, Femina (India) Stuff Hair Magazine, Beauty & Style, Khush Wedding, Wedding Affair, and Snoop The March–April 2008 issue of Time n Style Beauty magazine featured Karishma on its cover page, with the title "Eye, Me & Myself - Let your eyes speak". She appeared as the cover girl on FHM (India) in the April 2013 issue that captioned "IPL's hottest presenter - Karishma Kotak."

Karishma has done modelling for brands like FCUK and Ralph Lauren. She walked the ramp for the Lakme Fashion Week 2006. She has been a ramp model for Asiana Bridal Show, MAC Cosmetics, Provogue, Titan Xylus launch 2006 India Fashion Street - Fashion Tour 2012 and Kochi International Fashion Week Season 2.

Karishma has also hosted a few events, the notable among those is her hosting the 2013 Indian Premier League auction in February 2013 at ITC Grand Chola, Chennai, which was broadcast live by Sony SIX. Indian cricket commentator and journalist, Harsha Bhogle also collaborated for the event sharing expertise on player and team strategies.

She walked the ramp showcasing Manali Jagtap's collection as a show stopper in March 2013 at a fashion show held at the Shockk Lounge in Bandra, Mumbai.

=== Music videos ===
Karishma acted in a few music videos, the prominent of which is a 2004 music video called Me Against Myself by British singer-songwriter Jay Sean. Her next appearance in a music video was for Sonu Nigam and Sapna Mukherjee's track Madbhari, which was released in 2006. In 2007, she appeared in an English-Hindi music video titled Belly Dancing by reggae DJ Apache Indian. She was also seen in the song 'Oscer' from her movie Kaptaan which also featured singer Badshah and Gippy Grewal

=== Films ===
In 2016, Kotak made her Punjabi film debut in Kaptaan. Karishma Kotak was also seen in the movie Freaky Ali paired opposite actor, producer Arbaaz Khan

=== Television ===
After getting some initial TV exposure in London doing The Karisma Show, Karishma worked as a presenter for India-related TV show known as Spa Diaries, targeted to high-end international audiences. She said, "I was so fortunate that I got to travel the whole of India and it was absolutely amazing. It was complete luxury and I was so blessed to get that job." Continuing in the TV industry, she next worked with a travel show called It's In. In November 2010, Karishma took part in a Telugu dance reality show called Naacho Rrey on Zee Telugu.

In October 2012, she participated in an Indian reality TV show, Bigg Boss Season 6 as a contestant on the TV Channel Colors. However, she had to make an emergency exit from the Bigg Boss house after spending nearly four weeks due to her father's demise. After leaving the show, she said in an interview with Rediff.com that she accepted the offer to do the show as her father, who had been unwell & was taken care of by Karishma, didn't want her to feel sad and wanted her to get noticed for a better career. After about 15 days of her exit, Karishma re-entered the show on day 42. She told Network 18, "I am feeling quite okay now. This is because of my dad's blessing that Colors has given me another chance to join the show." She was voted out of the show in December 2012. Reacting about her eviction, she commented in an interview, "I would have definitely liked to stay till the end, but I can't complain. Being able to survive in the house (Bigg Boss show) for 80 odd days isn't a mean feat." She also said, "I'll remember this experience all my life. It's been very interesting and emotional at the same time." Karishma made a special appearance on the show later as a presenter on the day before the finale of the show in January 2013. Talking about the recognition she received at the show, Karsishma told The Times of India, "Work has increased and yes, life has changed in terms of opportunities that are coming my way. It has been one of the toughest emotional journeys for me but it has definitely helped my career."

Karishma presented televised show called Extraaa Innings T20, a post match analysis of Indian Premier League 2013 - season 6 in April–May 2013. The show was telecast by SET Max and also featured Rochelle Maria Rao, Samir Kochhar and Gaurav Kapoor as her co-hosts. Karishma said in an interview, "Cricket is very close to every Indian's heart, so is IPL. I am definitely excited to travel all over the country, hosting the IPL and watching the matches live."

Kotak was named the official presenter of the 2023 season of the Canadian T20 cricket tournament, Global T20.

== Personal life ==
She said in a web-interview, "I come from a big family. I've seven masis (maternal aunts), two mamas (maternal uncles) and lots of cousins. I've a lot of love around me. I don't like to argue much, and I'm a spiritual and strong person. I also like to read a lot." She is fond of travelling and watching movies. Karishma likes to stay fit by good diet, doing one hour spinning classes 5 days a week, and eating healthy.

== Filmography ==
=== Films ===
Year	Title	Role	Language	Notes
2007	Shankar Dada Zindabad	Jahnavi	Telugu	
2010	In Ghost House Inn	Dorothy Fernandez	Malayalam	Guest Role
2014	Mr Joe B. Carvalho	Neena	Hindi	
2015	Luckhnowi Ishq	Sunaina	Hindi	
2016	Kaptaan	Sam	Punjabi	
2016	Freaky Ali	Aditi	Hindi	
2019	Bedhab	Anya	Hindi	
2022	Mister Mummy	Pushpa	Hindi	
2024	IRaH	Jasima	Hindi	
TBA	Love Affair †		Hindi	

=== Television ===
Year	Title	Role	Language
	The Karisma Show	Presenter	English
	Spa Diaries	Presenter	English
	It's In	Presenter	English
2010	Naacho Rrey	Contestant	Telugu
2012	Bigg Boss Season 6	Contestant	Hindi
2013	International Indian Film Academy Awards	Presenter	Hindi
2016	Mazaak Mazaak Mein	Presenter	Hindi
2015	Darr Sabko Lagta Hai	Archana in episode thirteen	Hindi
2023	Jhalak Dikhla Jaa 11	Contestant	

=== Sports presenter ===
Year	Tournament	Role	Channel
2013	Indian Premier League	Presenter	Sony SIX
2016	Karnataka Premier League	Presenter	Sony SIX
2017	Asian Premier League	Presenter	Sony SIX
2019	2019 Cricket World Cup	Presenter	Sony SIX
	Tamil Nadu Premier League	Presenter	Sony SIX
2016-17	Karnataka Premier League	Presenter	Sony SIX
2018-19	Mumbai Premier League	Presenter	Sony SIX
2018-2019	Bangladesh Premier League	Presenter	Bangla TV
2020	2020 Bangabandhu Cup	Presenter	RTV
2020	2020 T10 League	Presenter	Sony SIX
2023	2023 Global T20 Canada	Presenter	CBC Sports
