= Suhel Seth =

Indian businessman and columnist (born 1963)

- Born: 28 May 1963 (age 63); Calcutta, West Bengal, India
- Education: St. Joseph's College, Nainital; Jadavpur University, Kolkata
- Occupations: Businessman; columnist
- Known for: Co-founder, Equus Redcell Advertising Co. Ltd; Managing partner, Counselage India
- Spouses: Sandhya Narain (m. 1989; div. 1993); Lakshmi Menon (m. 2018)
- Children: 1

Suhel Seth (born 28 May 1963) is an Indian businessman and columnist who is the founder and managing partner of the consultancy firm Counselage India. Seth is also a columnist, actor, keynote speaker, and a TV Pundit.

He currently serves as the chairman, Marketing Committees of Confederation of Indian Industry (CII) and Federation of Indian Chambers of Commerce & Industry (FICCI). He is also on the Experts Committee of Indian Railway Board.

== Early life and education ==
Seth was born in Calcutta to Punjabi parents and lived there with his parents till the age of 28. His father owned a chemical factory in Calcutta, which was closed down on account of the then prevailing political unrest, largely due to Naxalite activities, union conflicts, and strikes.

Seth was educated at La Martinière Calcutta, where he was a member of the debating team, and at St. Joseph's College, Nainital. He then pursued his higher education from Jadavpur University.

== Career ==
In 1996, Seth and his brother founded the advertising agency Equus. He also founded Quadra Advisory with Shunu Sen. He started Counselage India, a consultancy firm in 2002, of which he is still a managing partner.

Seth was inducted to the global Advisory Board of the San Francisco-based blogging platform LiveJournal Inc. in 2008. After working with the Tata Group during the management crisis to reconstruct their brand image in 2016, Seth was hired by the Adani Group as a brand consultant in 2018. Seth is an established speaker on social and commercial trends for the Indian consumer base at business, advertising, and marketing events including several Indian Institute of Management (IIM) colleges. He is a regular columnist for the Financial Times, Hindustan Times, The Telegraph, and the Indian Express.

Seth is also a theatre enthusiast and has performed in over 135 English plays, and 6 films.

== Books ==
Seth has four books to his credit. His first book, In Your Face, is a compilation of interviews and columns by him published in different national dailies and magazines. He has co-authored the book Kalighat to Calcutta, with Khushwant Singh and R. K. Laxman. His last individually authored book Get to the Top, published in 2011, acts as a perfect guide for the aspirational Indian. It tells readers how to get ahead in life by connecting with the rich and famous. He has also co-authored The Target with Shantanu Guha Ray. It talks about the downfall of business tycoon Jignesh Shah's global empire.

== Filmography ==
Seth has acted in several English plays as well as a few Bollywood films. He sits on the international board of Royal Academy of Dramatic Arts (RADA).

His first role, in the movie Rog, was one that he took up on the request of a friend. He did a very small role in critically acclaimed movie Ek Din Achanak in 1989. He was then seen in the much-acclaimed multi-starrer Zindagi Na Milegi Dobara, where he played the father of one of the female leads. Seth was also a part of the critically acclaimed film Guzaarish. He was last seen in the 2015 film Calendar Girls, playing a character based on liquor baron Vijay Mallya.

== Philanthropy ==
Seth also sits on the board of the Max Foundation that works to provide access to cancer treatment for people across the globe. Seth is a donor at the Partition Museum established in Amritsar in 2017. He made a donation of ₹50 lakhs towards a gallery in the museum which is dedicated to his parents. He has a seat on the advisory board of the Indian Head Injury Foundation (IHIF). The foundation works towards building brain trauma care systems in India.

== Controversies ==
In 2011, tobacco major ITC filed two separate suits against Suhel, claiming his tweets and newspaper articles against its chairman, Y. C. Deveshawar, as defamatory. ITC officials alleged that Seth had been making such comments since 2007, when the company terminated its contract with his firm, Equus. Suhel responded through a tweet claiming that his account was constantly hacked into and that he was taking steps.

In 2014, during a panel discussion on sports conducted as part of the Times Literature Festival in Mumbai, Seth failed to recognise Viren Rasquinha, the former captain of India's national field hockey team, and questioned the latter's involvement in the event. Seth was subsequently forced to apologise after a public outcry.

In 2018, Seth was accused of sexual harassment by over 20 women that included model Diandra Soares, filmmaker Natashja Rathore, and writer Ira Trivedi, in a social media backlash referred to as India's MeToo movement. This led to Tata Sons, the holding company of the Tata Group, terminating Seth as its brand consultant.

This followed beverage maker Coca-Cola's public release that its long-standing association with Seth and his company, Counselage, stands dissolved. "He is not a consultant for the board or company presently", the statement said, adding that it took this step in the wake of ongoing allegations against Suhel in the #MeToo movement.

Post Coca-Cola, Adani Group too reportedly terminated Suhel's contract as branding consultant. The group stated the contract that had ended in September 2018 shall not be renewed. "Mr Suhel Seth was consulted for a short-term project which expired in September 2018. He is no longer associated with the Adani Group.", it said on Twitter. Two other Indian conglomerates, Mahindra Group and JSW Group, followed suit claiming not to be associated with Seth on any project.
