= Elle (India) =

- Zain Malik on the March 2018 cover of Elle
- Editor: Ainee Ahmedi
- Categories: Fashion
- Frequency: Monthly
- Circulation: 93,000
- First issue: December 1996
- Company: Ogaan Media Pvt. Ltd. (1996-present), now part of Sapphire Media Limited
- Country: India
- Based in: Mumbai
- Language: English
- Website: Elle.in
- OCLC: 44005789

Elle is the Indian edition of the worldwide lifestyle magazine of French origin called Elle.

== History and profile ==
The first issue of the Indian edition of Elle was the December 1996 issue. The magazine is published by Ogaan Publications Pvt. Ltd. Ogaan is based in Mumbai and has offices in New Delhi and Bangalore.

== Editors ==
The following have served as Editors of Elle India:

- Neerja Shah
- Nonita Kalra
- Aishwarya Subramanium
- Supriya Dravid
- Kamna Malik
- Ainee Ahmedi (Present)

== See also ==
- List of Elle (India) cover models
