= Guzaarish (film) =

2010 Indian romantic drama film

- Theatrical release poster
- Directed by: Sanjay Leela Bhansali
- Screenplay by: Sanjay Leela Bhansali; Bhavani Iyer
- Dialogues by: Vibhu Puri; Bhavani Iyer
- Story by: Sanjay Leela Bhansali; Bhavani Iyer
- Produced by: Ronnie Screwvala; Sanjay Leela Bhansali
- Starring: Hrithik Roshan; Aishwarya Rai Bachchan
- Cinematography: Sudeep Chatterjee
- Edited by: Hemal Kothari
- Music by: Songs: Sanjay Leela Bhansali; Background Score: Tubby-Parik
- Production companies: UTV Motion Pictures; Sanjay Leela Bhansali Films
- Distributed by: UTV Motion Pictures
- Release date: 19 November 2010
- Running time: 126 minutes
- Country: India
- Language: Hindi
- Budget: ₹75 crore
- Box office: ₹61.3 crore

Guzaarish (transl. Request) is a 2010 Indian Hindi-language romantic drama film written, composed, produced, and directed by Sanjay Leela Bhansali. The film stars Hrithik Roshan and Aishwarya Rai Bachchan in the lead roles, while Shernaz Patel, Aditya Roy Kapur, Monikangana Dutta, Suhel Seth, Swara Bhaskar, and Makrand Deshpande play supporting roles. It was jointly produced by Ronnie Screwvala under UTV Motion Pictures.

The film narrates the story of a paralyzed magician-turned-radio jockey who files a petition in court seeking permission to end his life. The film was released on 19 November 2010 to positive reviews from critics, who praised the direction, cinematography, and performances, particularly of Roshan, and Rai. It is regarded as one of the best performances of Roshan. However, veteran Indian writer Dayanand Rajan claimed that the plot of the film was plagiarised from his unpublished novel Summer Snow.

Guzaarish is the third film to feature Roshan opposite Rai after Dhoom 2 and Jodhaa Akbar. The film received nominations for its direction, music and performances of the lead actors, notably Roshan and Rai being nominated under the Filmfare Award for Best Actor and Best Actress, respectively, as well as both critics and popular choice awards at other functions.

== Plot ==
Ethan Mascarenhas is a former magician who is a quadriplegic. He becomes the Radio Jockey of an FM Station called Radio Zindagi. His show spreads magic, hope, and laughter through his irrepressible wit and humor to every listener and caller, making it difficult to imagine that this is a man who has been immobilized with a spinal injury for the last fourteen years. His nurse, Sofia D'Souza, has been accompanying him for the past twelve years.

On the fourteenth anniversary of his accident, Ethan decides to file an appeal to the court for mercy killing. Ethan takes the help of his best friend and lawyer, Devyani Dutta, to support his appeal. Devyani understands Ethan's appeal, agrees to his reasoning and decides to support him in his cause. Surprising everyone with her stance, Ethan's mother Isabel Mascarenhas also supports him in his petition, backing her son's demand. Ethan's physician, Dr. Nayak, who has consistently persuaded him to retract his case, finally relents to Ethan's appeal when he realizes that the friend in him is much stronger than the medic. Meanwhile, a young man named Omar Siddiqui enters Ethan's life to learn magic from him as he considers him to be the greatest of magicians. Impressed by his love for magic, Ethan agrees to pass on his legacy to Omar. Later, Omar confesses to Ethan that he is the son of Yassar Siddiqui, who happens to be responsible for causing Ethan's accident. Ethan knew of this the entire time, yet that didn't come in the way of passing his legacy to Omar.

On the day of verdict Ethan's plea is rejected by the court, saying that although the court sympathises with Ethan and understands his reasons for filing the petition, the legal code of the country cannot be violated in any circumstance. Ethan spends his time alone in his empty home, while Sofia was forcibly taken back by her husband. When Sofia returns, she confesses to Ethan that she got a divorce from her husband and tells him that she will help him end his life, whatever the consequences be as Ethan means more to her. On hearing her words, Ethan realises how much Sofia loves him. He proposes to her and Sofia accepts.

Ethan throws a farewell party for their friends and guests, where he speaks about everyone who has meant very dear to him and finally tells everyone about his and Sofia's love. Ethan says that he will be dying a happy man with no regrets and a heart full of Sofia's love, and bids all goodbye. At these words, all the guests embrace him, with Ethan laughing heartily.

== Cast ==
- Hrithik Roshan as Ethan Mascarenhas
- Aishwarya Rai Bachchan as Sofia D'Souza
- Shernaz Patel as Devyani Dutta
- Aditya Roy Kapur as Omar Siddiqui
- Suhel Seth as Dr. Nayak
- Nafisa Ali as Isabelle, Ethan's mother
- Rajit Kapur as Vipin Patel, public prosecutor
- Vijay Crishna as Rajhansmoni, judge
- Monikangana Dutta as Estella Francis
- Makrand Deshpande as Neville D'Souza, Sofia's husband
- Swara Bhaskar as Radhika Talwar, news correspondent
- Ash Chandler as Yasser Siddiqui
- Priyanka Bose as a bar singer (special appearance in the song "Udi Teri Aankhon")
- Achint Kaur as Saroj, news anchor
- Olivier Lafont as Father Samuel
- Sahil Shah as a student on the phone

== Production ==
=== Development ===
"I have lived the pain of facing the isolation of failure after Saawariya. It was the toughest time of my life. Suddenly everyone disappeared, and that included the people who had worked with me on Saawariya for two years. Because of the suffering, I began to get seriously interested in the subject of mercy killing. I began to read up as much as possible on the subject. My research showed that mercy killing was prohibited by law in many countries including India . Almost a year of studying the super-sensitive subject, I concluded that every human being should have the right to die with dignity. The pain and suffering and the dignity with which I bore them prompted me to make a film on mercy killing."

— Sanjay Leela Bhansali speaking about the film in an interview with Indo-Asian News Service (IANS)

Bhansali first told media about his next directorial venture, when he gave an interview to the Indo-Asian News Service (IANS). In the interview he said that he had decided to call his film, Guzaarish, which is set to be shot in Goa.

=== Casting ===
Bhansali was on the lookout for a mature couple for the portrayal of his lead roles in Guzaarish. After watching their films Dhoom 2 and Jodhaa Akbar, both of which had starred both Rai and Roshan, Bhansali decided that the pair exuded a dignity and elegance much needed for his film. Though Rai had agreed to the script without even reading it, Roshan was all set to say no to the film. Amita Sehgal, Casting Director, hired other actors including Shernaz Patel, Vijay Crishna, Nafisa Ali, Aditya Roy Kapur and Suhel Seth. Makrand Deshpande was recruited to play an important three-minute cameo in the film on Hrithik Roshan's suggestion. Bhansali said that he had always wanted to work together with Roshan for a very long time as he was impressed by his sincerity as an actor. He added that the script of Guzaarish gave him the right opportunity to sign him. About the leading lady, Aishwarya Rai Bachchan, he said that the role suited her to perfection and though she would have accepted his offer, it was important for an actor to be convinced of what he or she is doing. Bhansali stated that if any of the leading cast had refused to sign, he wouldn't have made Guzaarish. He later stated saying, the film was only possible if Hrithik and Aishwarya had acted in it.

=== Pre-production works ===
Before starting the filming of Guzaarish, Bhansali visited Ajmer Dargah in Rajasthan for seeking blessings. Bhansali also met the singing legend Lata Mangeshkar, whom he had revealed to be the source of inspiration to him, to seek her blessings before he fully embarked on filming Guzaarish. During the meeting, Mangeshkar told that she was a big fan of Bhansali's films and that she was fortunate to be the source of inspiration behind such a talented director's film. She told the media members that "..Even I had heard that he makes his singers hear my songs over and over again before making them sing. I've always been a big fan of Sanjay's films, specially Black. I remember watching the Filmfare Awards in the year of Black. Every time the nominations were announced I prayed for Black to win. And it did. If I'm a source of inspiration to him then I count myself fortunate". Bhansali candidly admitted that he was very much afraid of meeting Lata since "..one doesn't hobnob with one's god". He added that once he reached her home, he "... just wanted to sit and gaze at her. I realized in person she's as magical as she is in her singing. There's something other-worldly about her, a quality I haven't encountered in anyone else in my life". Like all his other films, Bhansali preferred shooting at a studio. Bhansali says, "I like to construct sets and then light it up. It is a part of my story telling. My story needs a setting and I like to create that ambiance." Hence he chose Filmcity, Mumbai to shoot the movie. Before the actual filming started, Hrithik Roshan spent time with a lot of patients to understand his role better and get into the skin of his character. He revealed that he used to ".. spend six hours with the patients, initially once a week and then once a month. I used to go to understand what they go through, what they think, what their needs are. They have taught me a lot of things. So if I have benefited from this experience so much, I am sure that when people see the film and understand the character, they will get a lot to learn".

Since Roshan's character was a paraplegic, Bhansali wanted to give him a natural look. Hence he was instructed by the director not to indulge in his regular workouts since he cannot look fit and trim in the film, so as to give touches of authenticity to his character. The movie is set in Goa, and hence, Bhansali wanted to give a Portuguese touch to his frames. Sumit Basu, the Art Director, created Ethan's House in Mehboob Studio with a very Spanish/Portuguese flavour and the auditorium for magic acts, the court room, Martin's Bar in Yash Raj Studio. Also keeping in mind the costumes Bhansali hired Sabhyasachi Mukerjee as the costume designer, who had worked Bhansali in Black. Mukherjee had earlier worked in the film Raavan with Aishwarya Rai Bachchan the same year.

Make-up artist, Ojas M. Rajani was hired to do Aishwarya Rai Bachchan's make-up for the movie.

=== Filming ===
The film's shooting started on 29 July 2009 at Mehboob Studio, Mumbai. It was announced that the first schedule would be shot in July and August to capture the monsoon melody and romance of the place. It is notable that Bhansali came back to Goa after his first film, Khamoshi: The Musical for filming a movie. During the first day of shooting, he made sure that his mother was present on the sets. Sources revealed that his mother was his reason for making films and ".. it is imperative that she be present." Hrithik Roshan joined the crew on 22 July. Aishwarya Rai Bachchan joined the crew during the initial part of August after wrapping up the shoot for Raavan / Raavanan. A specially made-to-order remote-controlled modernized wheelchair was used in the movie for the role of Ethan Mascarenhas.

The next outdoor session of the film was done in Panjim. The lead actors had stayed at the Taj, Goa. During the day shoot at Divar, the unit's base camp was at an Englishman Jan Bostock's home in Divar island, just off Panjim for 4–5 days. Apparently, the film-maker, who is known for his hot-tempered nature, threw away the continuity sheets of one of the scenes being shot while shooting in the outskirts of Goa when one of his assistant directors made the same mistake twice. Hrithik Roshan sang a Hindi song in the film, after attempting playback singing in his previous movie Kites, in which he had rendered an English song. Bhansali himself personally trained Roshan for the song. Though the director had got the track recorded by another singer so that shooting in Goa could go on uninterrupted, in case Roshan could not complete his recording, his version was finally recorded after four or five takes. Roshan later said in an interview that "Bhansali was really surprised on hearing it."

During the filming of the movie, Bhansali also choreographed some of the songs. He used to dance on the sets of Guzaarish at times to make the moves clear to his actors. Many times he broke into a dance himself to convey the steps that he had in mind. This took most of his crew by surprise. Pony Verma, who was the choreographer for most of the songs in the film, revealed that as soon as Bhansali conceived a song, he would send it to her and then sing it to her as well. During the shooting of the song, a singer and a guitarist were on the sets. The choreography took place to the accompaniment of live guitar strings and song. According to Verma, this novel way of functioning had enhanced the appeal of the song. She added that when "... the song is playing live, you pick up a lot." She also acknowledged the efforts put in by the lead actress Aishwarya Rai Bachchan, with whom she had frequent discussion about the feel of the song.

The third schedule of the film began on 30 October 2009. The grueling schedule lasted till January 2010, at the city's Mehboob Studios. Rumours had it that during the filming of the movie, Bhansali and Roshan got into a tiff over the excessive use of English in the movie. Roshan, whose previous film Kites was also blamed for having non-Hindi dialogues, did not want to take a risk and lessen Guzaarish's appeal. Though there were no comments from either of them, it was learned that the issue was finally sorted out. Bhansali himself put all speculation to rest saying that ".. we (Hrithik Roshan and himself) were actually singing along quite happily."

The final schedule of the movie was shot in Yashraj Studios from 21 February 2010. Bhansali found that on the other sets where he had shot the film, he was being frequently disturbed by guests, which prevented him from providing the full concentration which the movie demanded. According to the crew "..Yash Raj Studios was not only classy and had all the facilities but it also doesn't allow guests to come in." Taking these factors into consideration Bhansali decided to bury the hatchet with Aditya Chopra over a film title and started shooting in the studios. The schedule included a spontaneous dance song with Aishwarya Rai Bachchan, choreographed by Bhansali himself.

The song "Udi" was pictured during this session which was choreographed by Longinus Fernandes, whom Bhansali had judged in Jhalak Dikhla Jaa, a popular dance based reality show. Fernandes was already known for his works in Slumdog Millionaire and Jaane Tu... Ya Jaane Na. According to him Bhansali "..wanted to make the song different and unique. I asked him if we can add a little bit of Spanish to it and give it a raw, earthy feel. He liked the idea, so we gave the whole dance a very rustic look in order to make it look as natural as possible". The choreographer added that the dance sequence was very distinct in that the audience had never seen Rai doing such steps. He went gaga over the lead actress saying that she danced like a dream. Longinus said in an interview that it ".. did not take her long to learn the dance but it did take her some time to perfect it and to get into the mood of the character". In an interview Sanjay Leela Bhansali said that in the song Udi, "..with such few words Sofia manages to say so much. It was my tribute to Waheeda Rahman's character in Guide. "In a sequence from the film, Ethan explains Omar, that the first magic he had performed was for his mother. Bhansali said that it is inspired from his childhood days. He said, "I remember my grandmother selling off the last of her silver and storing chillar in large Johnson baby powder tin. Every afternoon she would count that money and put it back. That kurr-kurr of the coins being bought out, counted and put back had to be heard again. The value of those coins doesn't exist anymore but it was an important part of my growing up." Since Roshan's character, Ethan, plays a magician in the initial portion of the film, a Ukrainian magician was hired for teaching him magic tricks, after a long search for a professional magician. The magic stunts performed by Roshan and Monikangana Dutta formed the major portion of the film shot in the last schedule.

Among the many stunts shot there was a particular sequence in which Roshan had to dance using a large transparent ball as a property. The actor said that he had trained the hardest to practice spin in one of the dance sequence. Roshan said, "I trained for a month. It was not a long piece of dance but there was lot of jazz ballet where I was required to spin as there is a ball in my hand and I am playing with it as well as dancing. None of my songs up till now have spin because I am very bad at it." The cinematographer of the movie Sudeep Chatterjee was asked to interpret the script completely so that Bhansali could understand his perception too. Praising his director to be very open and cooperative Chatterjee acknowledged in an interview about Bhansali's penchant for closed spaces. He said that his main challenge was to make the scenes look different though the protagonist is locked in a single room. To make these differences the lighting was adjusted such that one sees the room in twilight, at night, during the day, in early morning. The camera was made always mobile to counter Ethan's stillness. Slightly mobile things were deliberately kept always around Ethan like a fluttering curtain, a fish bowl on Ethan's night stand which according to the cinematographer mocked at his stillness all the time.

To enhance the intensity between his characters, Bhansali wanted a correctly intense reference point for Hrithik and Aishwarya's feelings and conversations. Bhansali said that he thought the sentiment of thwarted passion and smothered intensity of star-crossed lovers in Romeo & Juliet expressed his protagonists' inexpressible feelings very well.

When asked about the preparation she did for the film, actress Aishwarya Rai Bachchan said in an interview that both herself and the director Bhansali ".. just like to walk randomly around the sets and "feel". Sometimes I sit quietly and gaze into space or the ground and he captures all that. In fact, the poster picture with me looking away was taken like that. I was looking at the ground, lost in deep thought and he clicked it and told me that he was putting it on his poster. He knows when I am ready to do a scene, when I am in character, and the like. For instance, I delayed going on the set by two days and he did not say anything. He called me on the set and said we would start shooting in five days. On the second day, I tried hair, make-up, and costume. He told me I was ready to give my first shot and indeed, I was." About the script Bhansali said that he had worked on the script for 18 months and says, "My film is mainstream in terms of budgets, cast and audience and I had to make sure that I did not hurt anyone but evoked a debate."

=== Styling ===
Sabyasachi Mukherjee made a debut in jewelry line with Guzaarish. He had designed the line keeping in mind a multicultural element with a nomadic vibe. Omar Siddiqui played by Aditya Roy Kapur was styled like a struggling French musician. Suhel Seth, who played Ethan's doctor, is presented in stiff suits and Shernaz Patel, Ethan's lawyer is given a look of a Gandhian in cotton saris and three-quarter blouses. The maids are in dumpy dresses. The costume designer says that "..the clothes are nearly theatrical and they have a mind of their own. If you remove the characters and hang the clothes, they will tell a story. It's like Neverland or the reality version of The Magic Faraway Tree!". The entire look of Rai consisted of thirty-seven long frocks, four dumpy shoes, maxis, aprons with motifs of cutlery, quirky glasses and jewelry, surreal hairdos and red lips. For the collection, Sabyasachi used precious and semi-precious stones, minakari and filigree and had to work with about 60 skilled workers from West Bengal to complete the line. The price range of rings and earrings starts from Rs. 40,000 and navratan necklaces are priced at Rs. 510,000. On the look of Ethan Mascarenhas, Mukherjee said that the make up and costume was more organic. On a lighter note he added that he wanted his hero to look like Clark Kent and not James Bond.

=== Digital Intermediate and VFX Works ===
The DI and VFX for Guzaarish was done by Prime Focus, a global Visual Entertainment Services group, who had previously collaborated with Sanjay Leela Bhansali on many films including 'Black' and 'Saawariya'.

The shots which involve visual effects are listed below.

- The enormous grand house that appears throughout the movie was a CGI creation to replace the church that was actually at the shoot location in Goa.
- For the much talked about opening shot in which Hrithik Roshan is sitting on a wheelchair and trying to flick a fly off of his nose, a lot of research was done by the artists to understand the details of a fly's texture, look and feel, movement, the flutter of its wings, etc. The detailing went to the extent of casting the shadow of the fly when it sits on Hrithik's nose.
- In the sequence when Shernaz Patel is talking on the phone standing by the porch and the one when Aishwarya is travelling back home in a boat, the sky was digitally recreated.
- Hrithik's enacting of a ballet sequence with a transparent ball was originally shot with a real ball. However some shots needed to have a CG ball when it was impractical to execute the shot with a real one. In between the sequence, Hrithik lies on the ball to take a 360-degree turn. This was originally shot with a green cubical turntable to give Hrithik the necessary support to do the act and the table had to be replaced with the transparent ball.
- The candle tricks in the film were modified to make it appear as if the flame detaches from the wick and keeps floating up in the air, as does Hrithik, who joins the flame back to the wick.
- In one of the flash-back scenes, a young Hrithik goes to cheer up his mother Isabel and ends up doing magic for the first time. As his mother shakes him lovingly, CG coins start falling from his coat and hair.
- In another scene Hrithik, in a wheelchair, is teaching Omar the trick of rubbing his hands together and generating flying bits of soaked paper. The flying bits of paper were created in CG.
- The Magic Box Trick involving Estella and Ethan has been modified by creating a 3D replica of Monikangana's face and then animating the face with blinking eyes and a smile inside the box.
- Other shots like creating CG rain, creeper and wall cleanups, creating a lamppost with moths and flies were also done by the artists.

=== Promotion and publicity ===
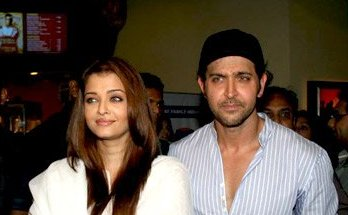
Roshan and Rai at the promotion of the film

The first look of the film was supposed to be released along with Dharma Productions' We Are Family on 3 September. Later the trailer was withdrawn from We Are Family. The official reason given for the postponement of the trailer was the time factor as the producers felt that there was a lot of time before the release of Guzaarish, and hence it was decided Guzaarish's first promotional trailer would feature in theaters a month later with Siddharth Anand's Anjaana Anjaani.

Owing to the Ayodhya verdict, the release of Anjaana Anjaani was also postponed to 1 October, which saw the release of another Aishwarya Rai Bachchan film Enthiran – The Robot. The first viewing opened to positive responses. The 1 minute, 48 seconds long trailer focused entirely on Hrithik and Aishwarya and was sans dialogue. The trailer was described by the critics as ".. delightful visuals, exhilarating background score, elaborate costumes, and understated but intense emotions – the promo has a signature Bhansali look and feel. It reminds you of Black, it reminds you of Saawariya. Faridoon Shahryar, Content Head Bollywood Hungama website, opined that the first look was".. sheer poetry, amalgamation of mesmeric music, metaphorical imagery, a tinge of humour, a larger than life settings, and loads of pathos". Alongside the release of the promotional trailer, posters and downloadable background materials were also spread officially through the internet. During the "presser", attended by Aishwarya Rai Bachchan, Hrithik Roshan, Ronnie Screwvala, Aditya Roy Kapur, Monikangana Dutta, Shernaz Patel, other cast and crew of the movie and Bhansali himself, the director said ".. You go through so much in life, so many things about life are unspoken, hope and joy of living, and I thought it was important to make a film which dealt with a topic like this."

A nervous Bhansali, who had met the media after a long time, said he was very afraid of handling a mic after so long. He thanked UTV Chairman Ronnie Screwvala for his unrelenting support. Bhansali made headlines for the day when he said that Aishwarya Rai Bachchan was ".. his muse, his jaan, and I get terribly excited when I make a film with her because she is very, very special. Some people are timeless and Aishwarya will be there for another 20 years". About the lead actor he said, "I have never enjoyed working with any other actor as much as I have enjoyed working with Hrithik.

Aishwarya Rai Bachchan told the press that "This was a very special film for us. We are glad to share this special piece of work with you before we reveal it to the rest of the world." Hrithik Roshan shared with the press that it was ".. true that I have not done anything that has been life altering. This movie has changed my outlook towards work, changed my life. It is so beautiful that 30 years or 40 years from now, I'll look back and smile I had the opportunity to make this film."

Hrithik Roshan elaborated on his character saying that he was ".. a super character in the film. I have interacted with about 20 such patients who suffer from complete paralysis of the lower half of the body, including both legs which is mostly caused by damage of the spinal cord. They are real life superheroes and I am representing their emotions on screen".Roshan said that he was able to identify with Ethan Mascarenhas because, when he was going through the Guzaarish script, he had been nursing a knee problem and doctors told him that the knee will never be okay. According to Roshan, the script "..energised me so much that I was not depressed about my knee problem anymore".

== Controversies ==
=== Allegations of plagiarism ===
The film's storyline was said to be similar to the 2004 Spanish movie The Sea Inside. In his review for SBS Australia, film critic Simon Foster also compared it to The Sea Inside as well with other movies such as Whose Life Is It Anyway? (1981) as well The Diving Bell and The Butterfly (2007), all sharing the theme of the "suffering-artists", with Whose Life Is It Anyway? in particular being about "a quadriplegic sculptor fighting for the right to end his life." Indian film critic Baradwaj Rangan in his review details what he considers to be the direct "lifts" from these movies: a dialogue of the movie, from Ethan's mother, is the literal Hindi translation of Whose Life Is It Anyway ("Aakhir yeh zindagi hai kiski"), Ethan's spine-snapping accident is a "replay" of the similar accident from The Sea Inside while the scene of throwaway shot of a fly on the face is taken from The Diving Bell and The Butterfly.

Dayanand Raajan said that a book he had written, Summer Snow, had been copied by Guzaarish.

After the film release in November, Akhil Rajendra Dwivedi, a script writer, sued Bhansali for Rs. 20 million alleging that the director used his script without informing him. Dwivedi claimed that he had registered his script, very similar to that of Guzaarish, in 2005 and had even met Bhansali in 2008. He alleged that the director had loved the script and said that he would get back to Dwivedi in a few weeks time. Dwivedi claimed that Bhansali never reverted and was unreachable for Dwivedi.

Lyricist Taabish Romani argued that the movie scrip was based on his own script titled Goonj Uthi Shehnai, registered with the Film Writers' Association (FWA) in 2002. After years of dispute, the matter going up to the High Court, the two ultimately agreed for a court settlement and Romani was paid up to Rs 3 lakh by Bhansali.

=== Aishwarya Rai Bachchan's smoking incident ===
Another controversy regarding the movie started brewing when the first look of the movie was released which showed the lead actress Aishwarya Rai Bachchan smoking in a car. National Organisation for Tobacco Eradication, the body working for tobacco eradication, wrote to actress Aishwarya Rai Bachchan expressing concern over use of her images smoking a cigarette in the banners of film Guzaarish displayed all over Mumbai. The organization's spokesperson said, that it would issue a legal notice to the actor under the provisions of the anti-tobacco legislation for the alleged advertisement of tobacco smoking in the public.

=== Comments by Salman Khan ===
Salman Khan, a close associate of Sanjay Leela Bhansali, in an award ceremony Super Idols, for felicitating specially abled people, by television channel IBN-7, took potshots at Guzaarish, hinting at its poor box office collection. Later in the same event, he said to one of the winners of the awards, "I will give you the number of Sanjay Leela Bhansali, you write it down, he has made Black, Khamoshi, made many pictures and made heaps of money but may be it won't come out, but it should come out." The comments came as a shocker to many, since Salman was one of Bhansali's favorites and the lead actor in his first movie Khamoshi and Hum Dil De Chuke Sanam. Bhansali reacted by saying that "If such an old and trusted friend can be so insensitive I don't want anything to do with the entertainment industry".

== Special screening ==
Sanjay Leela Bhansali, who had famously given a lavish premier of his earlier film Saawariya, decided to do away with a similar event for Guzaarish. Though the movie had released on 16 November in Dubai, it was slated to release in India on the 19th of the same month. Sources reported that "..some of the VVIP invitees who told him that he had made another masterpiece (Saawariya) were busy sending out bulk messages against the film during the premiere. Since the Saawariya premiere took place two nights (on Wednesday rather than Thursday) before its public release the damage done was irreparable. Sanjay decided there and then to never have a premiere of any of his films."

The director had the first screening of Guzaarish for the cast members and their families on Monday night. After the screening, the director allowed himself to be convinced to show the film to a few chosen ones. Hence he specially handpicked 30 invitees include the Bachchan family, leading man Hrithik's parents Pinky and Rakesh Roshan, Hrithik Roshan's Father- in-law Sanjay Khan, Shabana Azmi and Javed Akhtar, Deepika Padukone, Rohan Sippy, Karan Johar, Ashutosh Gowariker, Rajkumar Hirani, Vidhu Vinod Chopra, Goldie Bhel singer Kunal Ganjawala, film Maker Akbar Khan, fashion designers Sandip Khosla, Manish Malhothra, and Shahid Kapoor." According to Bhansali he already had got the "big thumbs-up" he needed, "For me, it was more than enough that my mother liked the film. All other opinions, I'll take with a pinch of salt."

Later, Aishwarya Rai Bachchan also requested for a special screening of the movie for her family. According to Rai, this was a special gift to her father, who was celebrating his birthday on the same date. It was also attended by directors Subhash Ghai, David Dhawan, actors Shabana Azmi and Sonam Kapoor.

== Reception ==
=== Critical reception ===
The film received mostly positive reactions from critics. Filmfare rated the film 4 out of 5 and wrote, "Guzaarish is unabashedly Sanjay Leela Bhansali. In a film where life itself is the villain everything is larger than life, no surprise there. The house is grand, the characters even more so, the laughter is magnificent, the pain operatic and the treatment of all of the above is colossal in a deafening, attention seeking way that leaves no room for subtext or imagination." Writing for NDTV, Anupama Chopra rated the film 3 out of 5 and believed that the film would be effective if the writing was more organic and the emotions felt more authentic but Bhansali never gives us a chance to invest in these people. Reuters trashed the movie for its over the top performances and stated that the lead actor Hrithik Roshan is the only saving grace of the movie where "everything else, like Aishwarya Rai's make-up, seems fake and loud, and puts you off. The emotions, the set design, the dialogues, Hrithik Roshan's beard are all out of this world, residing in some alien planet that only Bhansali inhabits." The Hindu reviewer Sudhish Kamath gave a negative review to the movie and heaped praises on the lead actor Hrithik Roshan saying that "Hrithik Roshan gives one of the best performances of his career as a man trapped in a wheelchair/bad film, desperately craving for freedom.." As a bottomline he said that Guzaarish is "Highly pretentious, boring film with leftover craving-for-your-sympathy melodrama from Black and unused sets from Saawariya". The Times of India, which gave a 4.5 rating, mentioned that "Guzaarish is an unusual film in many respects".

Australian critic and columnist Simon Foster of Special Broadcasting Service (SBS) gave a 3 star rating in which described it as "a melodrama that never says in two words what it can say in ten, Sanjay Leela Bhansali's Guzaarish balances its blubbery sentimentality with some beautifully realised images to heart-warming and generally likable effect. The Sunday Times gave a nine star rating and said "Guzaarish is a movie about hope, magic and life. Khaleej Times said " This wonderful work of art, nuanced and magical in its portrayal, is about dying. But Ethan, as played by Hrithik Roshan, is so bemused by adversity that he can actually look at his own suffering with dispassionate humour." Deccan Herald noted that only select – audience may find the movie appealing saying that "the performances stand out. Guzaarish might appeal only to Bhansali viewers."

=== Box office ===
Guzaarish had a good opening at the box office, collecting a net gross of ₹245.5 million (US$2.6 million) in its opening weekend. The movie went on to collect ₹514 million (US$5.5 million) nett in its first week. The movie netted ₹694 million (US$7.4 million) in its lifetime run.

== Soundtrack ==
Sanjay Leela Bhansali made his debut as a film song composer with this movie. The lyrics were penned by A. M. Turaz, Vibhu Puri, and the late Jagdish Joshi. It features playback singers K.K., Rakesh Pandit, Sunidhi Chauhan, Kunal Ganjawala, Harshdeep Kaur and Shankar Mahadevan and was produced under T-Series label. Vibhavari Apte Joshi made her Bollywood debut through this film. She caught the attention of Sanjay Leela Bhansali, who noticed her as a participant in Sa Re Ga Ma (aired on a Marathi channel) while she was singing Konkani – Hindi song.

The official music launch of Guzaarish took place on 15 October 2010, by T-Series. The event was hosted by Aditya Roy Kapur. Actors Aishwarya Rai Bachchan, Hrithik Roshan, Shernaz Patel, Suhel Seth, Monikangana Dutta, UTV chairman Ronnie Screwvala and Bhansali himself along with the entire music and background team were present in the music launch. Singers Shankar Mahadevan, KK, Kunal Ganjawala, Vibhavari Apte Joshi, and Shail Hada, who had lent their voices to the film's soundtrack gave a stage performance of each of their songs in the album.

== Accolades ==
Award	Category	Nominee	Result
Filmfare Awards	Best Director	Sanjay Leela Bhansali	Nominated
Filmfare Awards	Best Actress	Aishwarya Rai Bachchan	Nominated
Filmfare Awards	Best Actor	Hrithik Roshan	Nominated
Filmfare Awards	Best Female Playback Singer	Sunidhi Chauhan	Nominated
International Indian Film Academy Awards	Best Cinematography	Sudeep Chatterjee	Won
International Indian Film Academy Awards	Best Director	Sanjay Leela Bhansali	Nominated
International Indian Film Academy Awards	Best Actor	Hrithik Roshan	Nominated
International Indian Film Academy Awards	Best Actress	Aishwarya Rai Bachchan	Nominated
International Indian Film Academy Awards	Best Supporting Actress	Shernaz Patel	Nominated
International Indian Film Academy Awards	Best Screenplay	Sanjay Leela Bhansali, Bhavani Iyer	Nominated
Stardust Awards	Star of the Year – Female	Aishwarya Rai Bachchan	Won
Stardust Awards	Star of the Year – Male	Hrithik Roshan	Won
Stardust Awards	Best Female Playback Singer	Sunidhi Chauhan	Nominated
Stardust Awards	Best Breakthrough Performance – Male	Shail Hada – Tera Zikr	Won
Stardust Awards	Best Breakthrough Performance – Female	Vibhavari Apte Joshi – Saiba	Won
Stardust Awards	Film of the Year	Guzaarish	Nominated
Stardust Awards	Best Director of the Year	Sanjay Leela Bhansali	Nominated
Stardust Awards	Star of the Year – Male	Hrithik Roshan	Nominated
Stardust Awards	Star of the Year – Female	Aishwarya Rai Bachchan	Nominated
Stardust Awards	Best Actress in an Ensemble Cast	Shernaz Patel	Nominated
Stardust Awards	Superstar of Tomorrow – Male	Aditya Roy Kapur	Nominated
Stardust Awards	New Musical Sensation – Female	Harshdeep Kaur (Chand Ki Katori)	Nominated
Stardust Awards	Standout Performance by a Music Director	Sanjay Leela Bhansali	Nominated
Star Screen Awards	Best Supporting Actress	Shernaz Patel	Won
Star Screen Awards	Best Cinematography	Sudeep Chatterjee	Won
Star Screen Awards	Best Actor	Hrithik Roshan	Nominated
Star Screen Awards	Best Actress	Aishwarya Rai Bachchan	Nominated
Star Screen Awards	Best Choreography	Longinus Fernandes (Udi)	Nominated
Zee Cine Awards	Best Actor (Critics)	Hrithik Roshan	Won
Zee Cine Awards	Best Actress (Critics)	Aishwarya Rai Bachchan	Won
Zee Cine Awards	Best Art Direction	Rajneesh Basu	Won
Zee Cine Awards	Best Director	Sanjay Leela Bhansali	Nominated
Zee Cine Awards	Best Female Playback Singer	Sunidhi Chauhan (Udi)	Nominated
BIG Star Entertainment Awards	BIG Star Most Entertaining Director	Sanjay Leela Bhansali	Nominated
BIG Star Entertainment Awards	BIG Star Most Entertaining Film Actor – Male	Hrithik Roshan	Nominated
BIG Star Entertainment Awards	BIG Star Most Entertaining Film Actor – Female	Aishwarya Rai Bachchan	Nominated
Producers Guild Film Awards	Best Director	Sanjay Leela Bhansali	Won
Producers Guild Film Awards	Best Actor in a Leading Role	Hrithik Roshan	Won
Producers Guild Film Awards	Best Actress in a Leading Role	Aishwarya Rai Bachchan	Won
Producers Guild Film Awards	Best Cinematography	Sudeep Chatterji	Won
Producers Guild Film Awards	Best Special Effects	Prime Focus	Won
Producers Guild Film Awards	Best Actress in a Supporting Role	Shernaz Patel	Nominated
Producers Guild Film Awards	Best Dialogue	Bhavani Iyer & Vibhu Puri	Nominated
BIG Star Entertainment Awards	BIG Star Most Entertaining Director	Sanjay Leela Bhansali	Nominated
BIG Star Entertainment Awards	BIG Star Most Entertaining Film Actor – Male	Hrithik Roshan	Nominated
BIG Star Entertainment Awards	BIG Star Most Entertaining Film Actor – Female	Aishwarya Rai Bachchan	Nominated
BIG Star IMA Awards	Best Visualized Song Track (Female)	Udi	Won
3rd Mirchi Music Awards	Female Vocalist of The Year	Sunidhi Chauhan – "Udi"	Nominated
3rd Mirchi Music Awards	Upcoming Female Vocalist of The Year	Vibhavari Joshi – "Saiba"	Nominated
3rd Mirchi Music Awards	Upcoming Music Composer of The Year	Sanjay Leela Bhansali – "Udi"	Nominated
3rd Mirchi Music Awards	Upcoming Lyricist of The Year	Late Jagdish Joshi and Vibhu Puri – "Keh Na Sakoon"	Nominated
3rd Mirchi Music Awards	Upcoming Lyricist of The Year	Vibhu Puri – "Sau Gram Zindagi"	Nominated
3rd Mirchi Music Awards	Best Background Score of the Year	Tubby-Parik	Nominated

Other Acclaims

- The screenplay of the film Guzaarish was invited by the Library of the Academy of Motion Picture Arts & Sciences (Oscars) to be part of its permanent script collection.

== See also ==
- Me Before You, 2016 British film about a tetraplegic man wishing to be euthanized.
- Disability in the arts
