= Luckhnowi Ishq =

- Directed by: Aanand Raut
- Written by: Usha Singh
- Produced by: Vijay Mishra
- Starring: Adhyayan Suman; Karishma Kotak
- Cinematography: E. Saravanan
- Edited by: Harkirat Singh Lal
- Music by: Raaj Aashoo
- Production company: KC Films Pvt Ltd
- Release date: 3 April 2015
- Running time: 127 minutes
- Country: India
- Language: Hindi

Luckhnowi Ishq (transl. Love in Lucknow) is a 2015 Indian romance film directed by Aanand Raut. It stars Adhyayan Suman and Karishma Kotak in lead roles. The film is produced by KC Films. It tells the love story of a young medical student from Delhi and a girl from Lucknow.

The film promises glimpses of the rich culture and surroundings of Lucknow. The movie was released on 3 April 2015.

== Plot ==
Prem (Adhyayan Suman) a medical student of Lucknow attends his friend's wedding and falls in love with Sunaina (Karishma Kotak). It is love at first sight and Prem wants to marry Sunaina; he even fights her brother Krishna who shares a close bond with his sister. Prem swears to marry Sunaina in the next 10 days and manages to keep his word. Prem is depressed and is not able to concentrate on work when Professor K.K (Sharat Saxena) scolds him. He later consoles Prem and asks him to focus on his studies since he is a very bright student and the professor wants him to top the MBBS exams. At Sunaina's home, everyone is very upset and Sunaina decides that she will find Prem and bring him to justice to stop the entire family's suffering. She swears that she will only come back once she finds Prem. Meanwhile, KK plays the love guru which gives the movie a pleasant feel.

== Cast ==
- Adhyayan Suman as Prem
- Karishma Kotak as Sunaina
- Sharat Saxena as Professor K.K
- Amit Joshi
- Gehana Vasisth
- Mukesh Khanna

== Production ==
The film was denied permission while shooting in Lucknow in July 2014. The film's shooting was wrapped up in January and it was scheduled for a March release, however the film was then scheduled to be released in April 2015.

== Marketing ==
The first look launch and music album of the film was launched at Andheri in Mumbai on 27 February 2015 in presence of the cast and the producer.

== Soundtrack ==
Luckhnowi Ishq

Soundtrack album by Raaj Aashoo
- Released: 3 April 2015
- Genre: Feature film soundtrack
- Length: 21:50
- Language: Hindi
- Label: Zee Music Company
External audio
- Audio Jukebox on YouTube

The soundtrack of Luckhnowi Ishq was composed by Raaj Aashoo while lyrics were written by Neeraj Gupta, Shakeel Azmi, Sudhakar Sharma & Kumaar.

Tracklist
No.	Title	Lyrics	Singer(s)	Length
1.	"Tu Aaina Hai Mera"	Neeraj Gupta	Mohammed Irfan (Additional Vocal: Seepi Jha)	04:28
2.	"Yaq Ba Yaq"	Shakeel Azmi	Raaj Aashoo (Additional Vocal: Pratibha Baghel)	05:04
3.	"Pyari Banno"	Sudhakar Sharma	Sunidhi Chauhan (Additional Vocals: Arun Daga, Jitendra Singh, Deepali Sathe, Supriya Pathak, Seepi Jha)	04:16
4.	"Bomb Kudi"	Kumaar	Amit Mishra, Palak Muchhal (Rap: Pratibha Baghel)	04:01
5.	"Bomb Kudi" (Featuring Labh Janjua)	Kumaar	Labh Janjua, Palak Muchhal (Rap: Pratibha Baghel)	04:01
Total length:				21:50
