= Freaky Ali =

- Theatrical release poster
- Directed by: Sohail Khan
- Written by: Sohail Khan; Raaj Shaandilyaa
- Produced by: Sohail Khan
- Starring: Nawazuddin Siddiqui; Arbaaz Khan; Amy Jackson; Nikitin Dheer; Asif Basra; Ankit Nagar
- Cinematography: Mahesh Limaye
- Edited by: Prashant Singh Rathore
- Music by: Sajid–Wajid
- Production company: Sohail Khan Productions
- Distributed by: Pooja Entertainment (India); B4U Motion Pictures (Overseas)
- Release date: September 9, 2016 (India)
- Running time: 120 minutes
- Country: India
- Language: Hindi
- Budget: ₹50 crore
- Box office: est. ₹21.32 crore

Freaky Ali is a 2016 Indian Hindi-language sports comedy drama film, written, produced and directed by Sohail Khan. The film stars Nawazuddin Siddiqui, Arbaaz Khan, and Amy Jackson in the lead roles.

Freaky Ali was released on 9 September 2016. Despite the obvious similarities to Happy Gilmore, the cast has maintained that it's an original story and not an adaptation.

== Plot ==
Ali, an orphaned poor Muslim man, gets fired from a clothing store after he insults a kid who turns out to be the owner's son. He worries that he won't be able to earn money anymore to take care of his Hindu mother, Sulbha but his friend Maqsood motivates him. They approach a rich and royal woman, Padmavati, for money, but manage to do it only after a fight with her. Maqsood, it is shown, works for a gangster, Danger Bhai.

Ali is all set to be married but the alliance is broken when the clothing store owner recognizes him and turns out to be a close relative of the bride's family. Dejected, Ali visits a golf course to get some money from a businessman named Singhania. Unaware of what he is up to, Ali pokes fun at Singhania, who challenges him to hit an ace. Ali accepts his challenge and wins it, returning home after collecting the money. Ali's uncle, Kishan Lal, who is a caddy driver for Singhania, tells Ali that if he plays golf he can get rich and become a champion. Motivated by this, he begins training under Kishan's tutelage.

Ali contests a golf tournament, and in the process, falls for royal champion Vikram Rathore's manager Megha, who praises his performance, while Vikram chides him. Ali pays the entry fee and qualifies for the top 60 players. Vikram soon fires Megha and shows his arrogance to Ali, but he retaliates, telling him that golf could be a game for the poor too. He begins winning a number of matches and earns enough money to take care of Sulbha; Megha grows close to him and Sulbha in the process.

Danger Bhai, upon the behest of his elder brother, Bade Bhai, tricks and blackmails Maqsood to hijack Ali's success, and a misled Maqsood cunningly substitutes himself for Kishan, misguiding Ali into losing matches. When Megha finds this out, Maqsood's cover is blown and Ali walks away in anger after slapping him. He tries to explain why he was doing this, but Sulbha lectures Maqsood on the importance of honesty. Maqsood regrets and decides to help Ali. Vikram injures Ali's hand on the pretext of congratulating him for getting to the finals; everyone feels worried and starts praying. Ali comes back to the final event with an injured hand which is recovering currently. Bade Bhai joins Danger Bhai, who in turn joins Vikram.

Maqsood tells Vikram that he may have broken Ali's hand, but he can't break his courage, and Maqsood becomes the new caddy. Ali gets inspired by his mother, who hits back at Danger Bhai and Bade Bhai for trying to insult her son. Ali then during the match gains his confidence back, removes plaster-bandage and plays perfectly. When Maqsood asks Ali what he's going to do, Ali tells him that he's going to "hit a six like in cricket". Ali executes a great shot flying above the tree and into the hole and Ali wins. Vikram accepts his defeat and lets him go. Bade Bhai praises Ali and declares that he will end all his illegal businesses, and Ali celebrates his victory with his friends and Megha.

== Cast ==
- Nawazuddin Siddiqui as Ali, Maqsood’s best friend
- Arbaaz Khan as Maqsood, Ali’s best friend
- Amy Jackson as Megha (Voice by Sonal Kaushal)
- Jas Arora as Vikramjeet Singh
- Seema Biswas as Sulbha
- Nikitin Dheer as Sohail Khan a.k.a. Danger Bhai
- Asif Basra as Kishan Lal
- Jackie Shroff as Bade Bhai (cameo appearance)
- Karishma Kotak as Aditi
- Paresh Ganatra as Fakru; Danger Bhai's assistant
- Alam Khan
- Salman Khan as Chulbul Pandey in archive footage from Dabangg

== Soundtrack ==
Freaky Ali

Soundtrack album by Sajid–Wajid
- Released: 19 August 2016
- Length: 12:31
- Language: Hindi
- Label: T-Series

Sajid–Wajid chronology
Kyaa Kool Hain Hum 3 (2016)	Freaky Ali (2016)	Tutak Tutak Tutiya (2016)

All music is composed by Sajid–Wajid.

Freaky Ali (Original Motion Picture Soundtrack)
No.	Title	Vocals by	Length
1.	"Din Mein Karengey Jagrata"	Wajid, Divya Kumar & Swati Sharma	4:02
2.	"Parinda Hai Parinda"	Wajid	4:15
3.	"Ya Ali Murtaza" (Qawwali)	Wajid, Danish Sabri & Payal Dev	4:14
Total length:			12:31

== Box office ==
=== India ===
The film opened with a collection of ₹2.55 crores in India. By the end of its first weekend, the film brought in ₹8.50 crore nett in India. In next four days the film collected ₹5 crore and took its first week collection to a total of ₹13.50 crore nett. The total nett collection of film in India is ₹14.67 crore while its grossing over there is ₹15 crore.

=== Overseas ===
The film grossed ₹43 lakh (US$45,000) in USA, ₹30 lakh (US$31,000) in UK, ₹16 lakh (US$17,000) in Australia and ₹4 lakh (US$4,200) in New Zealand. The worldwide gross was ₹21.32 crore (US$2.2 million).
