= Kaptaan =

- Directed by: Mandeep Kumar
- Written by: Dheeraj Rattan
- Produced by: Kumar S. Taurani; Ramesh S. Taurani
- Starring: Gippy Grewal, Monica Gill; Karishma Kotak, Pankaj Dheer; Kanwaljit Singh
- Cinematography: Anshul Chobey
- Edited by: Manish More
- Music by: Jaidev Kumar; DJ Flow; B Praak
- Production company: Tips Industries
- Distributed by: UTV Motion Pictures
- Release date: 20 May 2016
- Running time: 142 minutes
- Country: India
- Language: Punjabi

Kaptaan (transl. Captain) is a 2016 India Punjabi action/courtroom drama film directed by Mandeep Kumar and starring Gippy Grewal, Monica Gill, and Karishma Kotak. The release date of the film was 20 May 2016.

== Cast ==
- Gippy Grewal as Advocate Kaptaan Singh Grewal
- Monica Gill as Preeti
- Karishma Kotak as Sam
- Pankaj Dheer as Dhillon
- Kanwaljit Singh as Judge

== Track list ==
S. No.	Track	Singer	Music	Lyrics
1.	"Redua"	Gippy Grewal	DJ Flow	Raj Ranjodh
2.	"Oscar"	Gippy Grewal ft. Badshah	B Praak	Jaani
3.	"Rabba Rabba"	Gippy Grewal	Jaidev Kumar	Babu Singh Maan
4.	"26 26"	Gippy Grewal	DJ Flow	Amrit Maan

== Reception ==
=== Critical response ===
IANS and The Tribune reviewed the film.
