= IRaH =

- Theatrical release poster
- Directed by: Sam Bhattacharjee
- Written by: Sara Bodinar; Cristian Prisecaru
- Story by: Sam Bhattacharjee
- Produced by: Sam Bhattacharjee; Mitra Bhattacharya
- Starring: Rohit Roy; Ameet Chana; Karishma Kotak; Rajesh Sharma; Fagun Thakrar
- Cinematography: John W Raggett
- Edited by: Raja A, Mohammad Akram
- Music by: Karthik Ramalingam
- Production company: Thrill Films Ltd
- Distributed by: Big Films Media
- Release dates: 5 April 2024 (India and United Kingdom)
- Running time: 150 minutes
- Countries: India; United Kingdom
- Languages: Hindi; English

IRaH is a British-Indian English and Hindi language science fiction thriller film, directed by Sam Bhattacharjee and produced by Big Films Media and Thrill Films. The cast includes Rohit Roy, Rajesh Sharma, Fagun Thakrar, Karishma Kotak and Ameet Chana, and is set against a backdrop of technological advancements and ethical dilemmas.

== Plot ==
The digital archiving platform IRaH was introduced by the creative firm ELEMON. The CEO of ELEMON, Hari Singh, has the potential to profit millions from this most recent achievement. But when IRaH's actual potential becomes apparent, Hari finds himself questioning the ethics of the new AI digital world he has contributed to.

== Cast ==
- Rohit Roy as Hari Singh, CEO of ELEMON
- Rajesh Sharma as Detective Inspector Dunne
- Fagun Thakrar as Indali, a member of British Cyber Security Intelligence
- Ameet Chana as Rafi Patel, a former associate of Hari
- Karishma Kotak as Jasima, a pivotal contributor to the IRaH project

== Production ==
IRaH was filmed on location in London and other parts of the UK.

== Release ==
IRaH premiered on April 5, 2024, released by Eveready Pictures.
