= FHM India =

Indian men's magazine

For Him Magazine (FHM)

- Asin on the November 2009 cover of FHM
- Editorial Director: Nitin Agarwal
- Categories: Men's lifestyle
- Frequency: Monthly
- Publisher: Nitin Agarwal
- First issue: October 2007
- Company: TCG Media Limited
- Country: India
- Based in: New Delhi
- Language: English
- Website: FHMIndia.com

FHM India is the Indian edition of the British monthly men's lifestyle magazine called FHM. It is now published in India by TCG Media Limited and is the 32nd international edition of FHM. The first issue was launched in the October 2007 with Ujjwala Raut - India's most successful overseas supermodel on the cover.

High-profile names have been published in the magazine include top models, actresses and singers Priyanka Chopra, Katrina Kaif, Laig, Ujjwala Raut, Nicole Scherzinger, Olga Kurylenko, Kelly Brook, Maria Sharapova and Padma Lakshmi.

FHM India claims to have 1,000,000+ reach per month.

== History ==
The magazine began publication in 1985 in the UK under the name For Him Magazine and changed its title to FHM in 1994 when Emap Consumer Media bought the magazine. However, the full For Him Magazine continued to be printed on the spine of each issue.

FHM was published by NGPL from its inaugural issue up to the July 2010 issue. From August 2010 to March 2015, a publishing company out off Delhi published FHM, and thereafter, TCG Media took charge of FHM in India. Bauer Media shut down FHM & Zoo in UK in early 2016 along with some major license editions in a few countries. TCG Media Limited decided to continue publishing FHM India with consent from Bauer Media. TCG Media Limited is headquartered in New Delhi and also has offices in Ahmedabad, Mumbai and Bengaluru.

The magazine was launched with the October 2007 issue with Ujjwala Raut - India's most successful overseas supermodel on the cover.

== See also ==
- List of people on the cover of FHM (India)
- FHM
- L'Officiel
