= Dalimb (film) =

2026 Indian Hindi-language film by Priya Aven

- Directed by: Priya Aven
- Written by: Priya Aven; Varad Bhatnagar (dialogues); Tanuj Garg (additional dialogues)
- Produced by: Tanuj Garg; Atul Kasbekar
- Starring: Jitendra Kumar; Priya Bapat
- Cinematography: Nagaraj Rathinam
- Edited by: Sanjana Vasudevan
- Production company: Ellipsis Entertainment
- Distributed by: Zee 5
- Release date: 4 December 2026 (ZEE5)
- Country: India
- Language: Hindi

Dalimb is an upcoming Indian Hindi-language psychological thriller film written and directed by Priya Aven in her feature film directorial debut. Produced by Tanuj Garg and Atul Kasbekar under Ellipsis Entertainment as a ZEE5 original, the film stars Jitendra Kumar and Priya Bapat, alongside Kshitish Date and Kavin Dave. It is scheduled for direct digital release on Zee 5 on 4 December 2026.

== Premise ==
Set in suburban Mumbai, the film follows Suraaj (Jitendra Kumar), a folk artist and father whose search for his missing child leads him into a mystery involving folklore, memory, and blurred lines between reality and illusion.

== Cast ==
- Jitendra Kumar as Suraaj
- Priya Bapat
- Kshitish Date
- Kavin Dave
- Sai Prasad
- Harish Kulkarni
- Sagar Yadav

== Production ==
Dalimb is produced by Tanuj Garg and Atul Kasbekar under the banner of Ellipsis Entertainment in collaboration with ZEE5. The film marks writer Priya Aven's feature directorial debut, with dialogues written by Varad Bhatnagar and additional dialogues by Tanuj Garg. Nagaraj Rathinam served as cinematographer and Sanjana Vasudevan edited the film.

The title Dalimb—the Marathi word for pomegranate—was paired with the tagline "The myth is watching" during early promotions. Jitendra Kumar stated that he was drawn to the project after hearing the narration at Ellipsis Entertainment's office, noting that Suraaj offered a departure from his usual comedic and slice-of-life roles.

== Music ==
In November 2026, Zee 5 released a reimagined rendition of the devotional hymn "Sankat Mochan Jai Hanuman", which features as part of the film's narrative.

== Release ==
Zee 5 unveiled the first-look poster of Dalimb on 2 March 2026 ahead of Holi, followed by the official teaser on 23 July 2026. The film is scheduled to premiere exclusively on ZEE5 on 4 December 2026
