= Radhika Nair (model) =

Indian fashion model (born 1992)

- Born: 4 June 1992 (age 34); Jharkhand, India
- Years active: 2012 - present
- Modeling information
- Height: 5 ft 9.5 in (177 cm)
- Hair color: Black
- Eye color: Brown
- Agency: Ford Models (New York, Paris, Los Angeles); Special Management (Milan)

Radhika Nair is an Indian fashion model. Radhika was the first Indian model and the first to walk for Demna Gvasalia Balenciaga SS17 show in Paris.

== Early life ==
Radhika Nair was born Malayali in Kerala, but she was raised in Jharkhand. An avid amateur photographer inspired by Pieter Hugo and Martin Parr, her work has been published in W Magazine & Vogue. Radhika Nair is also an Indian classically trained singer of the Rajas.

== Career ==
In 2012, Radhika was studying commerce in Bangalore when she was introduced and signed to Anima creative models in Mumbai. An agency she later described to CR fashion book after her Balenciaga debut as "small-time model agents who helped place newcomers in little adverts." In 2016, casting director Henry Mackintosh Thomas arrived in India, Radhika met him was selected for an exclusive slot in the Balenciaga SS17 show. During this period Radhika commented on diversity in fashion, staying “we still don’t see many Aboriginals on the runway,” adding “maybe not everybody wants this lifestyle” and that “there are worse things women in India face.”

She has appeared in campaigns for Chloé shot by Steven Meisel, Versus Versace, H&M X Erderm & Net-a-Porter, Vivienne Westwood, Maje. Radhika has been on a group cover of British Vogue and appeared in magazines Vogue (Ukraine), Vogue (Germany), Vogue (Russia), W Magazine, Harpers Bazaar US, Harpers Bazaar UK, Harpers Bazaar (India), Dazed, Numéro China, CR Fashion Book, Unconditional Magazine & Elle (India).

Radhika has walked for Burberry, Anna Sui, Balenciaga (Exclusive), Belstaff, Chloé, Chalayan, Erderm, Emilio Pucci, Etro, Esteban Cortazar (opened), Loewe, Lacoste, Miu Miu, Marc Jacobs, MSGM, Mulberry, Marco De Vincenzo, Paul Smith, Prabal Gurung, Pringle of Scotland, J.W Anderson, Jil Sander, Redemption Couture, Ronald van der Kemp Couture, Sportmax, Sies Marjan, Trussadi, Vetements, Valentin Yudashkin, Vionett & Zimmerman.
