= Tere Bina Jiya Nahin Jaye =

Unreleased Indian film

- Directed by: Satish Kaushik
- Produced by: Viacom 18 Motion Pictures
- Starring: Himesh Reshammiya; Shruti Agrawal; Lakshmi Rai
- Music by: Himesh Reshammiya
- Production company: Viacom 18 Motion Pictures
- Distributed by: T-Series
- Country: India
- Language: Hindi

Tere Bina Jiya Nahin Jaye (formerly Hhey Gujju) is an unreleased Bollywood romantic comedy film from Viacom 18 Motion Pictures. After production difficulties, Viacom 18 Motion Pictures decided in December 2008 to rename the film after the Himesh Reshammiya song Tere Bina Jiya Nahin Jaye.

The film stars Reshammiya in double roles. Shooting began in April 2008, in Mumbai.

== Background ==
Originally titled HHey Gujju, Tere Bina Jiya Nahin Jaye is Himesh Reshammiya's next film with Viacom 18 Motion Pictures. The film has Himesh Reshammiya playing a double role for the first time and has been designed as a comedy.

Its original title Hhey Gujju was because Reshammiya plays two different Gujarati characters. One named Karsanlal Trikamlal Gandhi, is a bhai localite from Rajkot (Gujarat) who settled in Delhi's Chandni Chowk region. The other is Akash Patel, a cool Gujarati NRI Casanova who stays abroad. When Trikamlal and Akash come face-to-face, a comedy of errors take place. As is a tradition with Reshammiya's films, there will be introducing of two new leading ladies opposite him. Lakshmi Rai has already shot two song sequences and is waiting for the movie’s release.

== Cast ==
- Himesh Reshammiya as "Karsanlal Trikamlal Gandhi" and "Akash Patel"
- Shruti Agrawal as NRI girl
- Lakshmi Rai as Punjabi girl
