= Gia Johnson =

British fashion model (born 1985)

- Born: Gia Johnson-Singh; 18 June 1985 (age 41); London, England
- Occupation: Fashion model
- Years active: 2001–present
- Modelling information
- Height: 5 ft 8.5 in (1.74 m)
- Hair colour: Brown
- Eye colour: Hazel
- Agency: Models 1, Karin Models, Race Models, Seeds Models, Modelwerk, Option Model Management, New Models, NB People, Inega Model Management, The Casting Suite

Gia Johnson-Singh (born 18 June 1985) is a British fashion model best known for appearances in Vogue and is the face of Tia Maria. She was named Vogue's "Best Hot Stepper on the Ramp" Award as well as making their influential Power List. In 2011, Femina named her one of India's 50 Most Beautiful People.

== Early years ==
Gia Johnson-Singh was born on 18 June 1985 in London to an English mother and an Indian Punjabi father. Johnson is a British Indian, grew up in Richmond, London, with her mother, Kay, a Lotte Berk method Pilates teacher. She was first scouted on Kings Road at the age of 15. Johnson was uninterested and focused on her studies. It wasn't until Marie Soulier approached her that she decided to pursue modelling. Johnson signed with FM Model Management, who help develop Johnson while she was in high school. Johnson attended the Arts Educational School in London. She stayed until she finished her A-levels in English literature, theatre studies, performing studies and dance. Following her graduation, Johnson spent her gap year modelling in New York with her then boyfriend who was also a model.

== Career ==
=== Modeling ===
Johnson was first scouted by Marie Soulier, a top European scout, who has managed her for the past nine years. She was signed to FM Model Management at age 15. After graduating, Johnson moved to New York to pursue a full-time modelling career. She eventually returned to England and signed with Storm Model Management. However, Johnson eventually left Storm Models and signed to Profile Management where she stayed until April 2010 when she signed with Models 1. In addition, she is represented by Industry People in Manchester, Modelwerk in Hamburg, Seeds Models in Berlin, New Models in Belgium, Option in Zurich, Anima Creatives in India, Race Model Management in New York City, Karin Models in Paris, and NBPeople in Greece.

Johnson is predominantly an editorial model. She has graced the covers of Vogue, Verve, Sportswear International, and Femina. She has appeared in countless editorials for Vogue, Elle, iD, L'Officiel, Grazia, Cosmopolitan, GQ, M Magazine, and Henna. As a result, Johnson has worked with noted fashion photographers including Ellen von Unwerth, Rankin, Robin Derrick, and Dan Smith.

In addition to her editorial work, Johnson has appeared in many advertisements including ads for Clinique, Emyce, Ganjam, Lynx, Lavazza Coffee, Persona, Fields Watches, Redken, Pantene, Kerastase Hair Products, Frontier, and Splenda. She is also a long running model for British clothing catalogue ASOS.com in which she is the face of Rare, a collection by the pop group The Saturdays. Also, Johnson models regularly for English clothing companies such as Lipsy, Figleaves.com, and Gray & Osbourn. In addition to her catalogue work, Johnson became the face of Monisha Jaisings Spring/Summer 2010 campaign as well as Provogue Spring/Summer 2009. She has been featured in the 2010 Kingfisher calendar as well as the 2006 Lavazza calendar which was photographed by Ellen von Unwerth.

Johnson has walked numerous runways in London, New York, Paris, and India despite her smaller stature. She has walked for Levi Strauss & Co. Jeans and Diesel Jeans for London Fashion Week. In 2005, Johnson walked in Agent Provocateur's 10th Anniversary Fashion Show. Johnson most notably is a fixture on the Indian catwalks having participated in Lakme Fashion Week and FDIC Fashion Weeks. During Lakme Fashion Week Spring/Summer 2010, she walked for Manish Malhotra, Purvi Doshi, Sashikant Naidu & Masaba, and Shantanu & Nikhil. As a result, in August 2010, she was awarded with "Best Hot Stepper on the Ramp" Award at the Inaugural Vogue Beauty awards 2010. Johnson also walked for Amalraj Sengupta, Manisha Malhotra, Narenda Kumar, Troy Costa, Saisha Shinde, Nachiket Barve, Anupamaa, Nandita Thirani, Gen Next 5years, Sailex NG, Shrivan Narresh, and Anita Dongre in the Lakme Fashion Week's Winter Festive 2010.

=== Acting ===
Johnson had a small part in The Calcium Kid, starring Orlando Bloom.

== Personal life ==
In 2017, Johnson married David Lorenz, the found and owner of the LUNAZ Group. The company was named after the couple's daughter Luna. Johnson is a mentor at the Be Well Collective, a non-profit that supports teens interested in creative industries.
