= Shankar Dada Zindabad =

- Theatrical release poster
- Directed by: Prabhu Deva
- Story by: Rajkumar Hirani
- Dialogues by: Paruchuri Brothers
- Based on: Lage Raho Munna Bhai
- Produced by: Akkineni Ravishankar; Gemini Kiran
- Starring: Chiranjeevi; Srikanth; Karishma Kotak; Dilip Prabhavalkar; Sayaji Shinde
- Cinematography: Chota K. Naidu
- Edited by: Marthand K. Venkatesh
- Music by: Devi Sri Prasad
- Production company: Gemini Film Circuit
- Release date: 27 July 2007
- Running time: 152 minutes
- Country: India
- Language: Telugu

Shankar Dada Zindabad (transl. Long Live Shankar Dada) is a 2007 Indian Telugu-language action comedy film directed by Prabhu Deva, starring Chiranjeevi and Karishma Kotak. The film is a remake of the 2006 Hindi film Lage Raho Munnabhai and a sequel to Shankar Dada MBBS (2004). In addition, Dilip Prabhavalkar reprises his role as Mahatma Gandhi, while Srikanth and Sayaji Shinde play other supporting roles. The music is scored by Devi Sri Prasad and filmed by Chota K. Naidu.

== Plot ==
Shankar Dada is a local gangster (dada in Telugu) and ATM serves as his right-hand man. Shankar falls for Jahnavi, a radio jockey, after listening to her voice on an FM channel. When a contest is announced on Gandhi and his preachings with a chance to meet the radio jockey, Shankar hires a few professors forcefully to make his dream a reality.

With the help of the professors, Shankar manages to win the contest and meets her. Jahnavi invites him to "Second Innings" House where there are some old men to give a lecture on Gandhigiri. With no options left, Shankar goes to the library and reads about Gandhi. As he continues to study Gandhi, Shankar gets hallucination of watching Gandhi, whom he calls Bapu. It helps him in a way in giving good messages to society.

Shankar starts to visit the Second Innings House frequently to meet Jahnavi. Rajalingam, a cunning businessman, seeks to forcefully buy out that house, for the marriage of his daughter. Learning that Shankar's girlfriend Jahnavi is staying with those old men, Rajalingam sends Shankar and Jahnavi along with the old men on a foreign trip and gets the building vacated by ATM who is unaware of Rajalingam's plan.

Shankar who is furious upon knowing this demands Rajalingam to return that building and he starts using "Gandhigiri" instead of "Dadagiri". However, Rajalingam does not relent. In order to teach him a lesson, Shankar and the old men start staging Satyagraha. At one point, Shankar reveals to Jahnavi that he was not a professor and only a local dada. So Jahnavi hates him and leaves the place.

When Rajalingam's daughter's marriage was about to be canceled, Shankar enters the scene and tries to convince the bridegroom's father. Though he refuses to accept the alliance, his son insists on marrying the girl, as he became a fan of Shankar through the FM programme. Later, Shankar and Jahnavi reunite.

== Cast ==
- Chiranjeevi as Shankar Prasad alias Shankar Dada
- Srikanth as Rama Raju
- Karishma Kotak as Jahnavi
- Sayaji Shinde as Rajalingam
- Dilip Prabhavalkar as Mahatma Gandhi
- Vennira Aadai Nirmala as Shankar's mother
- Brahmanandam as Astrologer
- Sarath Babu as Panduranga Rao, Suresh's father
- Gundu Hanumantha Rao as Assistant of Astrologer
- Rohit as Azad
- Deepthi Nallamothu as Soundarya
- Janaki Sabesh as Rajyalakshmi, Sandhya's mother
- Sundaram Master as an old man in old-age home
- Kanta Rao
- Venu Madhav as Venu
- Sachu
- Dharmavarapu Subrahmanyam as Subramanyam
- Bhanu Prakash
- Sunil as Kumar
- Pawan Kalyan as Suresh (cameo)
- Ravi Teja (special appearance in the song "Jagadeka Veerudiki")
- Allu Arjun (special appearance in the song "Jagadeka Veerudiki")
- Sadha as Sandhya (cameo)
- Prabhu Deva (special appearance in the song "Jagadeka Veerudiki")
- Yana Gupta in item number in the song "Aakalesthe"
- Nagababu (special appearance in the song "Jagadeka Veerudiki")
- Devi Sri Prasad (special appearance in the song "Good Morning Hyderabad")

== Soundtrack ==
Shankar Dada Zindabad

Soundtrack album by Devi Sri Prasad
- Released: 9 July 2007
- Recorded: 2007
- Genre: Feature film soundtrack
- Length: 31:08
- Label: Aditya Music
- Producer: Devi Sri Prasad

Devi Sri Prasad chronology
| Aata (2007) | Shankar Dada Zindabad (2007) | Tulasi (2007) |

The soundtrack was composed by Devi Sri Prasad and released by Aditya Music. The song "Akalesthey" was reused in both Tamil and Hindi as "Daddy Mummy", in the films Villu (2009) and Bhaag Johnny (2015) respectively.

Track listing
| No. | Title | Lyrics | Singer(s) | Length |
|---|---|---|---|---|
| 1. | "Jagadeka Veerudiki" | Chandrabose | Mano | 5:54 |
| 2. | "Good Morning Hyderabad" | Devi Sri Prasad | Shankar Mahadevan, Divya | 5:14 |
| 3. | "Akalesthey" | Sahithi | Naveen Madhav, Mamta Mohandas | 4:20 |
| 4. | "Chandamama" | Bhaskarabhatla Ravi Kumar | K. S. Chithra, Venugopal | 3:42 |
| 5. | "Bhoogolamantha" | Sahithi | Adnan Sami, Gopika Poornima | 4:19 |
| 6. | "O Bapu Nuvve Raavaali (Vandemataram)" | Suddala Ashok Teja | Sagar, Devi Sri Prasad | 3:14 |
| 7. | "Good Morning Hyderabad" (Devi Mix) | Devi Sri Prasad | Devi Sri Prasad, Sagar | 4:25 |
| Total length: | | | | 31:08 |

== Reception ==
Sify rated the film 3/5 and called the film "a faithful adaptation of Lage Raho Munnabhai" and a "clean family entertainer." G P Aditya Vardhan of the Rediff.com awarded the film 3.5 stars out of 5 and wrote: "The film has style, comedy, colourful dance sequences and megastar's trademark gait."

== See also ==
- List of artistic depictions of Mahatma Gandhi
