= Angela Jonsson =

Icelandic model and actress

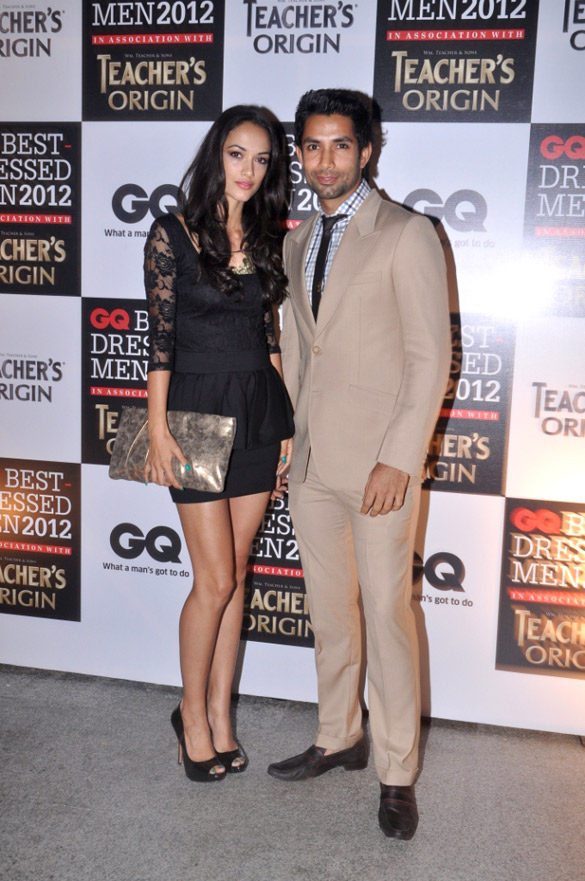
- Angela Jonsson at the Lakmé Fashion Week 2011
- Born: 28 February 1990 (age 36); Chennai, Tamil Nadu, India
- Citizenship: Iceland
- Occupations: Model, Actress
- Modeling information
- Height: 1.65 m (5 ft 5 in)
- Website: angelajonsson.com

Angela Jonsson (born 28 February 1990) is an Icelandic model and actress of half-Indian origin who shot to fame after she won the Kingfisher Calendar Model Hunt in 2011.

== Personal life ==
Jonsson was born on 28 February 1990 in Chennai to a father from Iceland and a mother from Mangalore. Her parents are coffee exporters. She has six sisters and three brothers, and spent her childhood in an estate on the mountains of Kodaikanal where she studied at an American international school.

Jonsson currently lives in New York with her partner, Geoff Nelson.

She graduated from The City College of New York in 2022.

== Career ==
Jonsson modelled for the Kingfisher Calendar in 2011 after winning the calendar's Calendar Girl Hunt competition that same year. She judged the Kingfisher Calendar Girl Hunt 2012. As of 2012, she shared that she had been taking Hindi diction and dance lessons with the goal of beginning her career as an actress in Bollywood and other Indian film industries.

She was voted one of Times 50 Most Desirable Women in India in 2011.
