= Raghu Rai =

Indian documentary photographer (1942–2026)

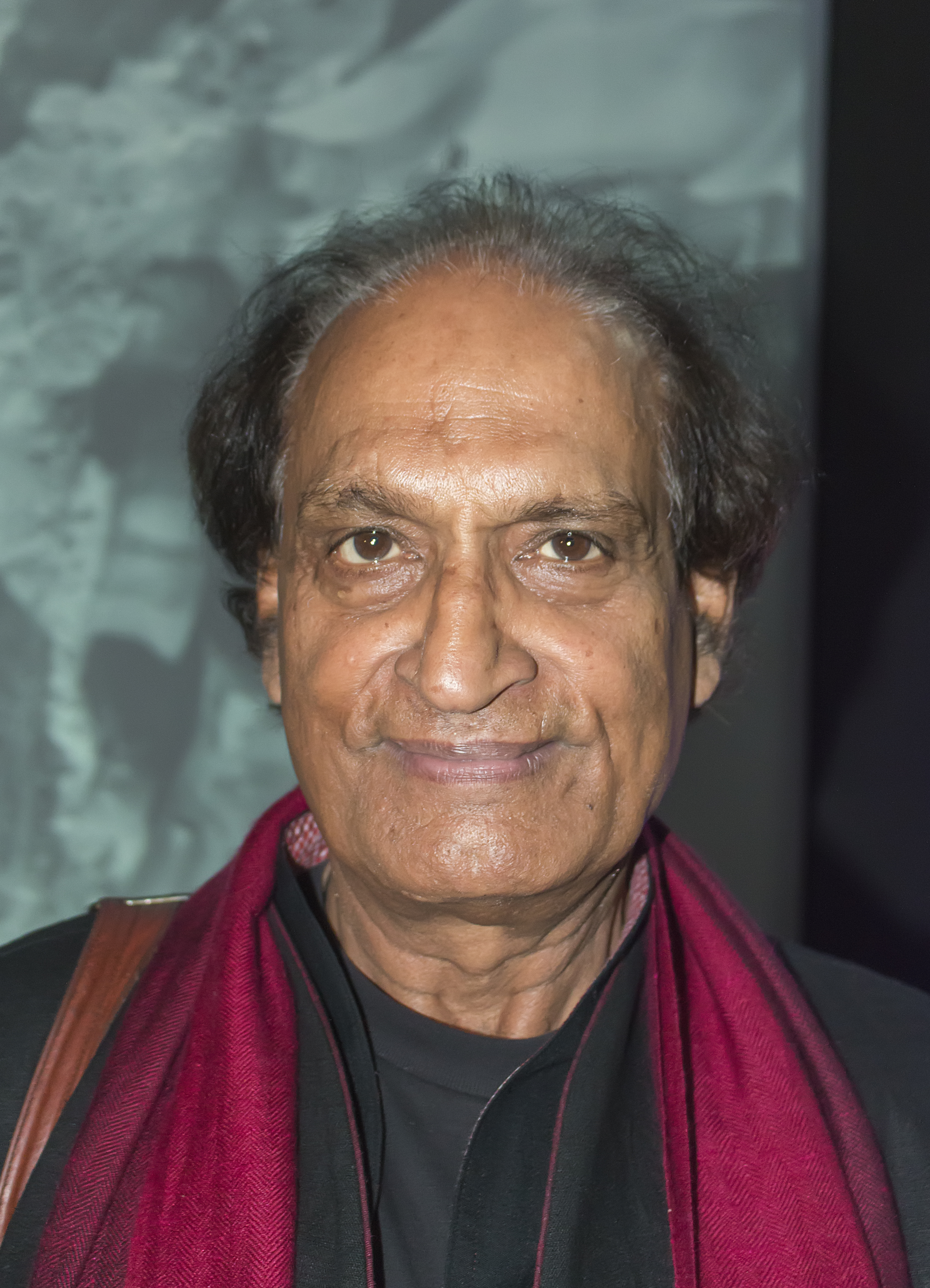
- Rai in 2015
- Born: 18 December 1942; Jhang, Punjab Province, British India
- Died: 26 April 2026 (aged 83); Delhi, India
- Occupations: Photographer, photojournalist
- Years active: 1966–2026
- Website: raghuraifoundation.org

Raghu Rai (18 December 1942 – 26 April 2026) was an Indian photographer and photojournalist, who is widely regarded as a pioneer of photojournalism in India and "India's most celebrated photojournalist". He was a protégé of Henri Cartier-Bresson, who nominated Rai, then a young photojournalist, to join Magnum Photos in 1977.

Rai became a photographer in 1966, soon joining the staff of The Statesman in New Delhi. In 1976, he left the paper and became a freelance photographer. From 1982 until 1992, Rai was the director of photography for India Today. He is known for documenting periods of rapid political and social change in India, including the Bangladesh refugee crisis, 1972 and the Bhopal gas tragedy, 1984. Over the years, his photo essays appeared in Time, Life, The New York Times, The Independent, and The New Yorker.

He served on the jury for World Press Photo from 1990 to 1997. He was known for his books, particularly Raghu Rai's India: Reflections in Colour and Reflections in Black and White.

== Early life and education ==
Rai was born in the village of Jhang, Punjab Province, British India (now in Pakistan), the youngest of four children. He was qualified as a civil engineer and took up photography at age 23.

== Career ==
Rai started learning photography in 1962 under his elder brother Sharampal Chowdhry (better known as S Paul), who is a photographer. In 1966, he joined The Statesman newspaper as its chief photographer. He and his colleague Saeed Naqvi visited Maharishi Mahesh Yogi's ashram in Rishikesh in the spring of 1968, when the Beatles arrived.

He left The Statesman in 1976 to work as picture editor for Sunday, a weekly news magazine published in Calcutta. Impressed by an exhibit of his work in Paris in 1971, Henri Cartier-Bresson nominated Rai to join Magnum Photos in 1977.

Rai left Sunday in 1980, and worked as a picture editor and photographer at India Today during its formative years. From 1982 to 1991, he worked on special issues and designs, contributing picture essays on social, political, and cultural themes.

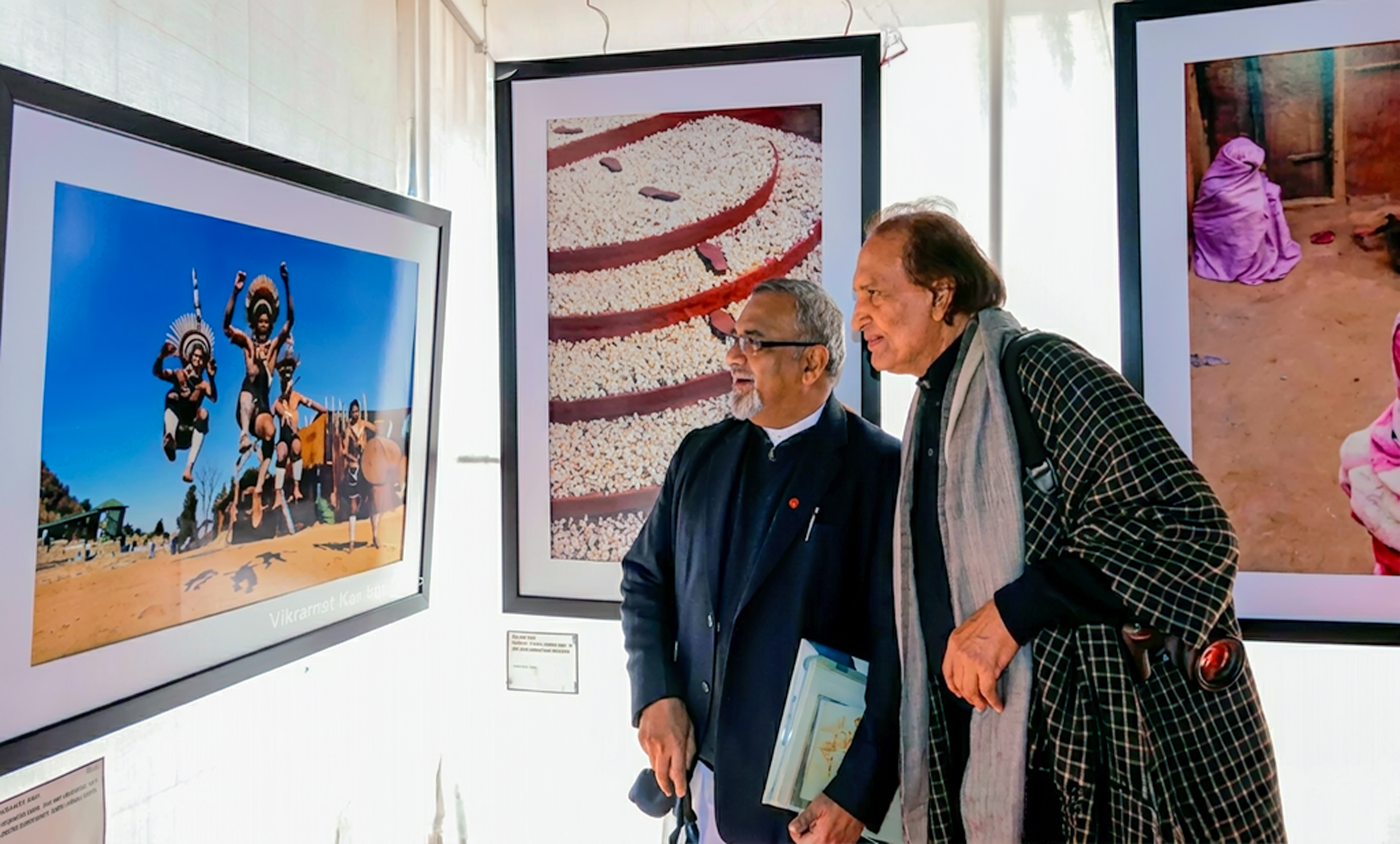
Raghu Rai at Shillong International Photo Festival in 2015

For Greenpeace, he completed an in-depth documentary project on the chemical disaster in Bhopal in 1984, which he covered as a journalist with India Today in 1984, and on its ongoing effects on the lives of gas victims. This work resulted in a book, Exposure: A Corporate Crime and three exhibitions that toured Europe, the United States, India and southeast Asia after 2004, the 20th anniversary of the disaster. Rai wanted the exhibition to support the many survivors through creating greater awareness, both about the tragedy and about the victims who continue to live in the contaminated environment around Bhopal.

In 2003, while on an assignment for Geo magazine in Mumbai, he switched to using a digital camera. As he said in an interview, "And from that moment till today, I haven't been able to go back to using film."

In 2017, his daughter, Avani Rai, followed her father on one of his trips to Kashmir to get an insight into his life and know him better. She released a documentary on this journey called Raghu Rai: An Unframed Portrait, executive produced by Anurag Kashyap.

Rai produced more than 18 books focusing on the culture and people of India, including Raghu Rai's Delhi, The Sikhs, Calcutta, Khajuraho, Taj Mahal, Tibet in Exile, India, and Mother Teresa. His photo essays have appeared in many magazines and newspapers including Time, Life, Geo, The New York Times, The Sunday Times, Newsweek, The Independent, and The New Yorker. He served on the jury of the World Press Photo from 1990 to 1997, and on the jury of UNESCO's International Photo Contest.

== Personal life and death ==
Rai was first married to journalist Usha Rai, and the couple had two children, Nitin Rai and Lagan Rai. After their divorce, he married conservation architect Gurmeet Sangha Rai, with whom he had two daughters, Avani Rai and Purvai Rai.

Rai died in Delhi on 26 April 2026, at the age of 83, after battling prostate cancer for two years. He was survived by his wife, Gurmeet Rai, his son, Nitin, and daughters Lagan, Avani and Purvai.

== Awards ==
- Padma Shri in 1972 for work on Bangladesh War
- Photographer of the Year from USA (1992)
- Lifetime Achievement Award by the information and broadcasting (I&B) ministry 2017
- Lucie Award for achievement in photojournalism 2018
- Académie des Beaux Arts Photography Award - William Klein 2019

== Exhibitions ==
- 1997 Retrospective – National Gallery of Modern Art, New Delhi, India.
- 2002 Raghu Rai's India – a Retrospective, Photofusion, London
- 2002 Volkart Foundation, Winterthur, Switzerland
- 2003 Bhopal – Sala Consiliare, Venice, Italy; Photographic Gallery, Helsinki, Finland
- 2003 Exposure: Portrait of a Corporate Crime – University of Michigan, Ann Arbor, USA
- 2004 Exposure – Drik Gallery, Dhaka, Bangladesh; Leica Gallery, Prague, Czech Republic
- 2005 Bhopal 1984–2004 – Melkweg Gallery, Amsterdam, Netherlands
- 2005 India – Musei Capitolini Centrale Montemartini, Rome, Italy
- 2007 Rencontres d'Arles festival, France
- 2012 My India – FotoFreo, Australia
- 2013 Trees (Black and white), New Delhi
- 2014 In Light of India: Photography by Raghu Rai, Hong Kong International Photo Festival, Hong Kong
- 2015 Trees, Art Alive Art Gallery, Delhi
- 2016, The Greatest Photographs of Raghu Rai, Ojas Art, New Delhi

== Books ==
- 1974 A Day in the life of Indira Gandhi, Nachiketa Publications, India
- 1983 Delhi: A Portrait, Delhi Tourist Development Corporation/Oxford University Press, India/UK
- 1984 The Sikhs, Lustre Press, India
- 1985 Indira Gandhi (with Pupul Jayakar), Lustre Press, India
- 1986/87 Taj Mahal, Times Editions, Singapore; Robert Laffont, France; Rizzoli Publications, USA
- 1988 Dreams of India, Time Books International, Singapore; (L'Inde), Arthaud, France
- 1989 Calcutta, Time Books International, India
- 1990 Delhi and Agra (with Lai Kwok Kin and Nitin Rai), Hunter Publications, Inc., USA
- 1990/91 Tibet in Esilio, Mondadori, Italy; (Tibet in Exile), Chronicle Books, USA
- 1991 Khajuraho, Time Books International, India
- 1994 Raghu Rai's Delhi, Indus/Harper Collins, India
- 1996/2001 Dreams of India, Times Editions, Singapore/Greenwich, UK ISBN 9789812046062
- 1996 Faith and Compassion: The Life and Work or Mother Teresa, Element Books, USA. ISBN 9781852309121
- 1997 My Land and Its People, Vadehra Gallery, India
- 1998 Man, Metal and Steel, Steel Authority of India, Ltd., India
- 2000 Raghu Rai... in his Own Words, Roli Books, India
- 2000 Lakshadweep, UT of Lakshadweep, India
- 2001 Raghu Rai's India – A Retrospective, Asahi Shimbun, Japan
- 2002 Bhopal Gas Tragedy (with Suroopa Mukherjee), Tulika Publishers, India
- 2003/04 Saint Mother: A Life Dedicated, Timeless Books, India;Mère Teresa), La Martinière, France
- 2004 Exposure: Portrait Of A Corporate Crime, Greenpeace, Netherlands
- 2004 Indira Gandhi: A Living Legacy, Timeless Books, India
- 2005 Romance of India, Timeless Books, India
- 2005 Mother Teresa: A Life of Dedication, Harry N. Abrams, USA. ISBN 9780810958753
- 2008 Raghu Rai's India: Reflections in Colour, Haus Books. ISBN 9781905791965
- 2010 India's Great Masters: A Photographic Journey into the Heart of Classical Music
- 2011 The Indians: Portraits From My Album, Penguin Books. ISBN 978-0-670-08469-2.
- 2013 Bangladesh: The Price of Freedom, Niyogi Books. ISBN 978-93-81523-69-8
- 2013 Trees, PHOTOINK, India
- 2014 The Tale of Two: An Outgoing and an Incoming Prime Minister
- 2014 Vijayanagara Empire: Ruins to Resurrection, Niyogi Books. ISBN 978-93-83098-24-8
