= Atul Kasbekar =

Indian fashion photographer (born 1965)

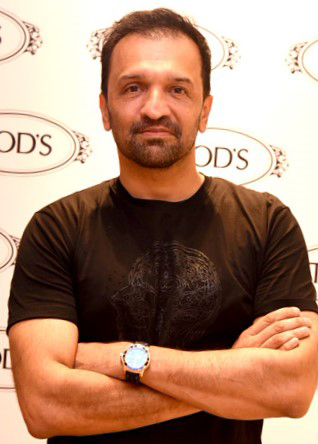
- Born: 22 April 1965 (age 61); Mumbai, India
- Education: Brooks Institute, Santa Barbara, US
- Occupation: Photographer
- Years active: 1991–present
- Known for: Fashion photography
- Notable work: Kingfisher Calendar
- Website: www.atulkasbekar.com

Atul Kasbekar (born 22 April 1965) is an Indian fashion photographer, recognised for his Kingfisher Calendar shoots. He owns Bling! Entertainment Solutions and Corporate Image, and is a Bollywood film producer through partnership in Ellipsis Entertainment.

== Education ==
Atul Kasbekar was born in Mumbai, where he studied at Campion School and Jai Hind College (University of Mumbai). Then he joined UDCT (now Institute of Chemical Technology), Mumbai for chemical engineering but dropped out in his second year to become a photographer, after seeking out Gautam Rajadhyaksha for advice. He graduated from the Brooks Institute in Santa Barbara, US. In Los Angeles, he worked as a trainee with photographers including Dennis Gray, Ron Slenzak, James B Wood, Jay Silverman, Jay P Morgan, Bill Werts and David Le Bon.

== Career ==
=== Photography ===
Kasbekar returned to India in 1990. In 1991, he began his professional career as a photographer by starting a studio named Negative Space. He named commercial assignments for Vadilal and at Lintas advertising as having launched his career.

Kasbekar is known for shooting the Kingfisher Calendar, featuring models clad in swimsuits, some of whom went on to successful acting careers.

=== Companies ===
In 2006, Kasbekar started Corporate Image, an identity and image management company for organisations.

He is also the frontman of celebrity management company Bling! Entertainment Solutions, which started in 2007.

=== Film production ===
Kasbekar has co-produced Bollywood films including Neerja (2016), Tumhari Sulu (2017), Why Cheat India (2019),, Looop Lapeta (2022) and Dalimb (2026). He formed production company Ellipsis Entertainment with Tanuj Garg in 2016.

== Recognition ==
Kasbekar and Vijay Mallya of UB Group won for the Kingfisher Calendar at the 2004 International Food and Beverage Creative Excellence Awards, and again in 2005, when they were the only Indian awardees.

He has served as honorary chairman of the Photographer's Guild of India.

== Personal life ==
Kasbekar and his wife Vandana have twin children, Arnav Kasbekar and Naomi Kasbekar.
