= Lakshmi Menon (model) =

Indian model (born 1981)

- Born: 4 November 1981 (age 44); Bangalore, India
- Education: Bangalore University
- Occupation: Fashion model
- Years active: 2008–present
- Spouse: Suhel Seth (m. 2018)
- Partner: Prabuddha Dasgupta (2000–2012)
- Children: 1
- Modelling information
- Height: 1.8 m (5 ft 11 in)
- Hair colour: Black
- Eye colour: Brown
- Agency: Marilyn Agency

Lakshmi Menon (born 4 November 1981) is an Indian model.

== Career ==
Lakshmi was 18 and studying sociology in Bangalore when a friend introduced her to Prabuddha Dasgupta, Lakshmi recounts her friend said "I was his kind of model. She said my dark skin and lanky figure would appeal to him". Menon soon became the muse and lover of photographer Prabuddha Dasgupta, 25 years her senior.

After modelling in India for several years, she began her international career in 2006 after Jean Paul Gaultier cast her to walk in his Chanel show in Paris. A show for Jean Paul Gaultier was followed by work on the Hermès catwalk and campaigns for Hermès, Max Mara, Givenchy, H&M, J Crew, Bergdorf Goodman, Bloomingdales, Neiman Marcus, and Nordstrom.

Menon was featured in French Vogue editorial for the first time in October 2008, after her Milan show for La Perla, in which she walked for D&G and Givenchy. She has also appeared in editorials for American, Spanish, Indian, and French Vogue, Harper's Bazaar, V Magazine, Dazed & Confused, Indian Elle, and Allure. She won the "This year’s Model" crown awarded by Vogue for 2008. She was also in the Top 10 Newcomers by Style.com and on the cover of Elle the same year.

She's worked with Jean Paul Gaultier, Hermes, Chanel—and is the face of the future." Vogue said in 2008 that she was "quite the embodiment of Givenchy's new-season style".

She featured in the 2011 Pirelli Calendar, photographed by Karl Lagerfeld and is the first Indian model to feature in a Pirelli calendar.

== Personal life ==
Menon was born to Malayali parents originally from Thrissur in Kerala, her mother was a schoolteacher and her father was in the armed forces.

Dasgupta was in an open polyamourous relationship with Lakshmi and his wife Tania Sethi from 2000 until his death from a heart attack at 55 in 2012. In December 2018, she married Suhel Seth. They have one daughter.
