= Nina Manuel =

Indian model, television host, and VJ

- Born: 24 April 1974 (age 51); Mumbai, Maharashtra, India
- Occupations: Model, Host, VJ
- Television: Nina at 9, Midnite Manuel, After Hours, Late Night V
- Spouse: Luv Shah (m. 2010)
- Children: 1 son
- Website: ninamanuel.in

Nina Manuel is an Indian model, television host, and VJ.

== Early life ==
Manuel was born on 24 April in Mumbai, India to a father from Kerala and a mother from Goa. She did her schooling in Kuwait, Bahrain and Dubai. She returned to Mumbai to complete her graduation in commerce from Mithibai College. She intended to become a lawyer, as she had finished 2 years in law college. Her mother saw an advertisement in the newspaper for the Femina Look of the Year contest in 1995. Manuel's mother encouraged her to participate and she did. Although, she did not win eventually, she did get spotted by Mehr Jessia. This started her modeling career. She left GJ Advani Law College after six months in favour of pursuing a modelling career.

== Career ==
Manuel began her modeling career with a show for Ensemble, an haute couture store, and got picked up by India's top designers. She started out doing a lot of ramp shows and consequently got modelling contracts with San Miguel, Lawman Jeans, Bausch & Lomb, Levi's, Coca-Cola, The Indian Express and Kodak. She has also done shoots for designers and music videos with Baba Sehgal, Remo and Anaida. She has done ramp shows for designers like Suneet Varma, JJ Valaya, Raghvendra Rathod and Ravi Bajaj.

Manuel's television career spans six years and includes three shows that she has hosted - Nina at 9 on Zee Muzic, Midnite Manuel on Zee Muzic and After Hours on Zee Cafe. She was also a VJ on Channel V, where she hosted the show Late Night V.

== Personal life ==
Nina Manuel married New York City-based businessman Luv Shah in a Hindu wedding at the JW Marriott in Juhu, Mumbai and a Church wedding at St. Peter's Church, Bandra in early 2010.

She moved to New York City after her marriage and currently lives between New York and Mumbai. They have one son, Zane Manuel Shah (born 2015).
