= Monikangana Dutta =

Indian model and actress based in Mumbai

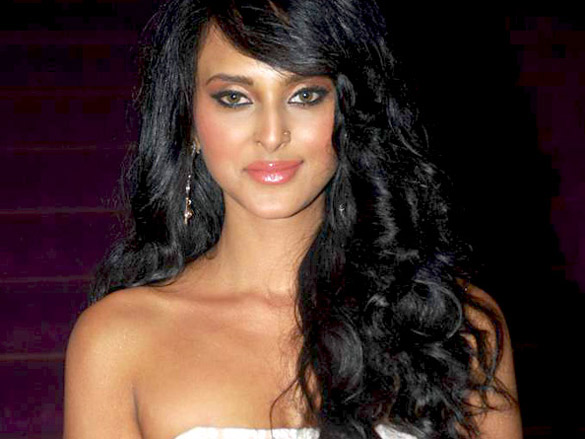
- Monikangana Dutta
- Born: Monikangana Dutta; Guwahati, Assam
- Occupations: Model, actress
- Website: www.monidutta.com

Monikangana Dutta is an Indian model and actress based in Mumbai. She is from Guwahati, Assam. She studied in Army Public School, Narangi, Guwahati and later graduated from the Matreyi College, University of Delhi.

== Acting ==
She made her acting debut in the 2010 Indian film, Guzaarish directed by Sanjay Leela Bhansali and starring Aishwarya Rai and Hrithik Roshan.
