= Ujjwala Raut =

Indian model

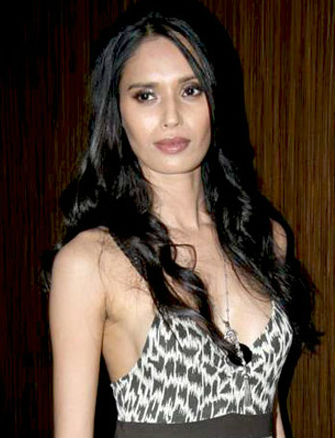
- Raut in June 2012
- Born: 11 June 1978 (age 48); Bombay, India
- Children: 1
- Relatives: Sonali Raut (sister)
- Modeling information
- Height: 1.78 m (5 ft 10 in)
- Hair color: Black
- Eye color: Brown
- Agency: Brave Model Management (Milan)

Ujjwala Raut (born 11 June 1978) is an Indian supermodel. She is considered one of India's first supermodels.

== Career ==
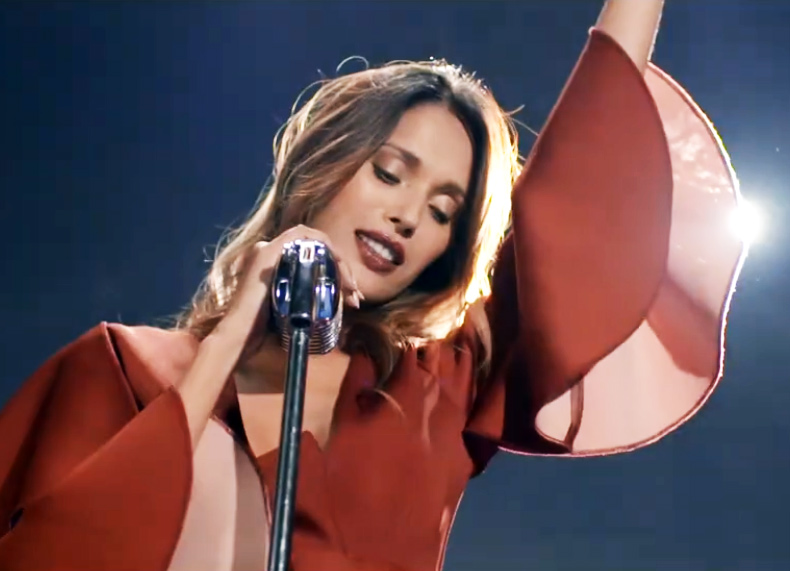
Ujjwala Raut in 2019

Raut was a 17-year-old commerce student when she won "Femina Look of the Year" at the Femina Miss India 1996 contest. She was also among the top fifteen in the 1996 Elite Model Look contest in Nice. She walked the runway for, among others: Yves Saint-Laurent, Roberto Cavalli, Hugo Boss, Cynthia Rowley, Diane von Furstenberg, Dolce & Gabbana, Betsey Johnson, Gucci, Givenchy, Valentino, Oscar de la Renta, and Emilio Pucci, and the Victoria's Secret Fashion Show.

She was the first Indian to appear as the face of Yves Saint Laurent (designer)

She was also among the first Indians to have walked for the Victoria's Secret Fashion Show, having done so twice, in 2002 and 2003. In 2012, she co-hosted and judged the Kingfisher Calendar Hunt with model Milind Soman.

She has acted in a Hindi Language Bollywood movie Sanam Teri Kasam (2016 film)

She was honored as one of the Women of the Year 2025 by Harper's Bazaar India in its second edition of these annual awards.

In September 2026, she appeared in Spring/Summer 2027 runway presentations for Prabal Gurung, Grace Ling, Bibhu Mohapatra and Burç Akyol, opening Gurung's show. She also featured in MAC Cosmetics India's Forever in M·A·C advertising campaign in August 2026.

== Personal life ==
Her father was a Deputy Commissioner in Mumbai Police. She was married to Maxwell Sterry on 19 June 2004 and the couple divorced in 2011. They have one daughter named Ksha.

== Television ==
Name	Year	Role	Channel
MTV Supermodel of the Year	2019	Mentor	MTV India
