= Shah Rukh Khan filmography =

Performances by Indian actor

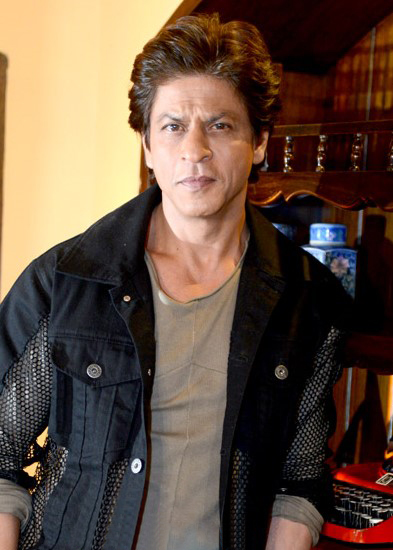
- Khan in 2017
- Film: 98
- Television: 44

Shah Rukh Khan is a famous Indian actor, producer and television personality known primarily for Hindi films. He began his acting career by playing a soldier in the Doordarshan series Fauji (1988), a role that garnered him recognition and led to starring roles in more television shows. He soon started receiving film offers and had his first release with the romantic drama Deewana (1992). Khan subsequently played villainous roles in the 1993 thrillers Baazigar and Darr, box office successes that established his career in Bollywood. In 1995, Khan starred opposite Kajol in Aditya Chopra's romance Dilwale Dulhania Le Jayenge, that became the longest running Indian film of all time. He continued to establish a reputation in romantic roles by playing opposite Madhuri Dixit in Dil To Pagal Hai (1997), and Kajol in the Karan Johar-directed Kuch Kuch Hota Hai (1998) and Kabhi Khushi Kabhie Gham (2001).

In 1999, Khan collaborated with Aziz Mirza and Juhi Chawla to start a production company, Dreamz Unlimited, whose first release was the comedy-drama Phir Bhi Dil Hai Hindustani (2000) starring Khan and Chawla. The film was a commercial failure as was their next production, Aśoka (2001), leading to a setback. His career prospects improved in 2002 when he starred alongside Dixit and Aishwarya Rai in Devdas, a period romance that garnered him critical acclaim. In 2004, he collaborated with his wife Gauri Khan to launch another company, Red Chillies Entertainment, whose first feature was the box office hit Main Hoon Na (2004). Khan's popularity continued to increase in the 2000s as he played the romantic lead opposite Preity Zinta, in Kal Ho Naa Ho (2003) and Veer-Zaara (2004). He also played against type as a NASA scientist in the drama Swades (2004), a hockey coach in the sports film Chak De! India (2007), and an autistic man in the drama My Name Is Khan (2010).

From 2007 onwards, Khan began to star opposite a third generation of heroines, most notably Deepika Padukone in Om Shanti Om (2007) and Anushka Sharma in Rab Ne Bana Di Jodi (2008). He went on to co-star with Padukone in the action-comedies Chennai Express (2013) and Happy New Year (2014), and reunited with Kajol in Dilwale (2015), all of which were among the biggest Hindi film grossers of the decade. He then starred alongside Sharma in Jab Harry Met Sejal (2017) and Zero (2018), both of which were commercially unsuccessful. Following a hiatus, Khan made a career comeback with the 2023 action films Pathaan and Jawan, each earning over ₹10 billion (US$110 million) to emerge as his highest-grossing releases.

With eight Filmfare Awards for Best Actor, he shares the record for the most wins in the category with Dilip Kumar. Khan has also starred in several non-fiction films that have documented his popularity, including the documentary The Inner and Outer World of Shah Rukh Khan (2005). From 2003 onwards, he hosted several award ceremonies, including ten Filmfare Awards and six Screen Awards. In addition, he has featured as the host of television game shows Kaun Banega Crorepati (2007) and the talk show TED Talks India (2017–2019).

== Film ==
Key
| † | Denotes films that have not yet been released |

=== Feature films ===
| Year | Title | Role(s) | Notes | Ref. |
|---|---|---|---|---|
| 1992 | Deewana | Raja Sahai | | |
| 1992 | Chamatkar | Sundar Shrivastav | | |
| 1992 | Raju Ban Gaya Gentleman | Raj Mathur | | |
| 1992 | Dil Aashna Hai | Karan Singh | | |
| 1993 | Kabhi Haan Kabhi Naa | Sunil | | |
| 1993 | King Uncle | Anil Bansal | | |
| 1993 | Maya Memsaab | Lalit Kumar | | |
| 1993 | Pehla Nasha | Himself | Cameo appearance | |
| 1993 | Baazigar | Ajay Sharma / Vicky Malhotra (Note: Khan played a single character in the film who has two different names.) | | |
| 1993 | Darr | Rahul Mehra | | |
| 1994 | Anjaam | Vijay Agnihotri | | |
| 1995 | Karan Arjun | Arjun Singh / Vijay Singh Sharma (Note: Khan performed dual roles in the film.) | | |
| 1995 | Zamaana Deewana | Rahul Malhotra | | |
| 1995 | Guddu | Guddu Bahadur | | |
| 1995 | Oh Darling! Yeh Hai India! | Hero | | |
| 1995 | Dilwale Dulhania Le Jayenge | Raj Malhotra | | |
| 1995 | Ram Jaane | Ram Jaane | | |
| 1995 | Trimurti | Romi Singh | | |
| 1996 | English Babu Desi Mem | Gopal Mayur / Hari Mayur / Vikram Mayur (Note: Khan performed triple roles in the film.) | | |
| 1996 | Chaahat | Roop Rathore | | |
| 1996 | Army | Major Arjun Singh | Special appearance | |
| 1996 | Dushman Duniya Ka | Badru | Cameo appearance | |
| 1997 | Gudgudee | Himself | Cameo appearance | |
| 1997 | Koyla | Shankar Thakur | | |
| 1997 | Yes Boss | Rahul Joshi | | |
| 1997 | Pardes | Arjun Sagar | | |
| 1997 | Dil To Pagal Hai | Rahul | | |
| 1998 | Duplicate | Bablu Chaudhry / Manu Dada | | |
| 1998 | Achanak | Himself | Cameo appearance | |
| 1998 | Dil Se.. | Amarkant Verma | 25th Film | |
| 1998 | Kuch Kuch Hota Hai | Rahul Khanna | | |
| 1999 | Baadshah | Raj (Baadshah) | | |
| 2000 | Phir Bhi Dil Hai Hindustani | Ajay Bakshi | Also producer | |
| 2000 | Hey Ram | Amjad Khan | Bilingual film, Tamil debut | |
| 2000 | Josh | Max "Maxy" Dias | | |
| 2000 | Har Dil Jo Pyar Karega | Rahul | Special appearance | |
| 2000 | Mohabbatein | Raj Aryan Malhotra | | |
| 2000 | Gaja Gamini | Himself | Special appearance | |
| 2001 | One 2 Ka 4 | Arun Verma | | |
| 2001 | Aśoka | Ashoka Maurya (Pawan) | Also producer | |
| 2001 | Kabhi Khushi Kabhie Gham | Rahul Y. Raichand | | |
| 2002 | Hum Tumhare Hain Sanam | Gopal | | |
| 2002 | Devdas | Devdas Mukherjee | | |
| 2002 | Shakti: The Power | Jai Singh | | |
| 2002 | Saathiya | Yeshwant Rao | Special appearance | |
| 2003 | Chalte Chalte | Raj Mathur | Also producer | |
| 2003 | Kal Ho Naa Ho | Aman Mathur | | |
| 2004 | Yeh Lamhe Judaai Ke | Dushant | | |
| 2004 | Main Hoon Na | Ram Prasad Sharma | | |
| 2004 | Veer-Zaara | Veer Pratap Singh | | |
| 2004 | Swades | Mohan Bhargav | | |
| 2005 | Kuchh Meetha Ho Jaye | Himself | Cameo appearance | |
| 2005 | Kaal | Himself | Special appearance in song "Kaal Dhamal"; Also producer | |
| 2005 | Silsiilay | Sutradhar | Special appearance | |
| 2005 | Paheli | Kishanlal / The Ghost | | |
| 2006 | Alag | Himself | Special appearance in song "Sabse Alag" | |
| 2006 | Kabhi Alvida Naa Kehna | Dev Saran | | |
| 2006 | Don: The Chase Begins Again | Mark "Don" Donald / Vijay Pal | | |
| 2006 | I See You | Himself | Special appearance in song "Subah Subah" | |
| 2007 | Chak De! India | Kabir Khan | | |
| 2007 | Heyy Babyy | Raj Malhotra | Special appearance in song "Mast Kalandar" | |
| 2007 | Om Shanti Om | Om Kapoor (O. K.) / Om Prakash "Omi" Makhija | | |
| 2008 | Rab Ne Bana Di Jodi | Surinder Sahni / Raj Kapoor | 50th film | |
| 2008 | Bhoothnath | Aditya Sharma | Special appearance | |
| 2008 | Krazzy 4 | Himself | Special appearance in song "Break Free" | |
| 2008 | Shaurya | Voiceover | | |
| 2008 | Kismat Konnection | Narrator | | |
| 2009 | Luck by Chance | Himself | Cameo appearance | |
| 2009 | Billu | Sahir Khan | | |
| 2010 | My Name Is Khan | Rizwan Khan | | |
| 2010 | Dulha Mil Gaya | Pawan Raj Gandhi (PRG) | Special appearance | |
| 2010 | Shahrukh Bola "Khoobsurat Hai Tu" | Himself | Special appearance | |
| 2011 | Ra.One | G.One / Shekhar Subramanium | | |
| 2011 | Don 2 | Mark "Don" Donald | Also producer | |
| 2011 | Love Breakups Zindagi | | Cameo appearance | |
| 2011 | Always Kabhi Kabhi | | Special appearance in the song "Antenna" | |
| 2012 | Jab Tak Hai Jaan | Samar Anand | | |
| 2013 | Bombay Talkies | Himself | Special appearance in song "Apna Bombay Talkies" | |
| 2013 | Chennai Express | Rahul Y. Y. Mithaiwala | | |
| 2014 | Bhoothnath Returns | Aditya Sharma | Cameo appearance | |
| 2014 | Happy New Year | Chandramohan "Charlie" Manohar Sharma | | |
| 2015 | Dilwale | Raj "Kaali" Bakshi / Ramlal | | |
| 2016 | Bhaag Jeetu Bhaag | Himself | Short film; Special appearance | |
| 2016 | Fan | Aryan Khanna / Gaurav Chandna | | |
| 2016 | Ae Dil Hai Mushkil | Tahir Taliyar Khan | Cameo appearance | |
| 2016 | Dear Zindagi | Dr. Jehangir "Jug" Khan | | |
| 2017 | Raees | Raees Aalam | | |
| 2017 | Tubelight | Gogo Pasha | Cameo appearance | |
| 2017 | Jab Harry Met Sejal | Harinder "Harry" Singh Nehra | | |
| 2018 | Zero | Bauaa Singh | | |
| 2019 | The Zoya Factor | Narrator | | |
| 2022 | Rocketry: The Nambi Effect | Himself | Special appearance | |
| 2022 | Laal Singh Chaddha | Himself | Cameo appearance | |
| 2022 | Brahmāstra: Part One – Shiva | Mohan Bhargav | Special appearance | |
| 2023 | Pathaan | Pathaan | | |
| 2023 | Jawan | Vikram Rathore / Azad Rathore | | |
| 2023 | Tiger 3 | Pathaan | Cameo appearance | |
| 2023 | Dunki | Hardayal "Hardy" Singh Dhillon | | |
| 2026 | King † | TBA | Filming | |

== Television ==
=== As actor ===
| Year | Title | Role | Notes | Ref. |
|---|---|---|---|---|
| 1988 | Fauji | Abhimanyu Rai | 13 episodes | |
| 1988 | Dil Dariya | Nandu | 12 episodes | |
| 1989 | Umeed | Anand Gupta | 14 episodes | |
| 1989 | Adhuri Zindagi | Joseph | Television film | |
| 1989 | Mahan Karz | Kanwar Singh | Television film | |
| 1989 | Wagle Ki Duniya | Himself | Episode: "Police Station" | |
| 1989 | In Which Annie Gives It Those Ones | Senior | Television film | |
| 1989 | Doosra Keval | Keval | 13 episodes | |
| 1989–1990 | Circus | Shekharan | 19 episodes | |
| 1989–1991 | Intezaar | | 26 episodes | |
| 1992 | Idiot | Pawan Raghurajan | 4-part miniseries | |
| 1993 | Rajani | Himself | 2 episodes | |
| 2013 | Taarak Mehta Ka Ooltah Chashmah | Himself | 1 episode | |
| 2014 | Taarak Mehta Ka Ooltah Chashmah | Himself | 1 episode | |
| 2014 | Living with KKR | Himself | Four part Discovery Channel documentary series | |
| 2015 | C.I.D | Himself | Episode 1316: "Shah Rukh Khan in Dilwale" | |
| 2015 | Taarak Mehta Ka Ooltah Chashmah | Himself | 1 episode | |
| 2017 | Taarak Mehta Ka Ooltah Chashmah | Himself | 1 episode | |
| 2020 | The Forgotten Army – Azaadi Ke Liye | Narrator | Miniseries | |
| 2020 | Fabulous Lives of Bollywood Wives | Himself | Reality show; episode 8 | |
| 2023 | The Romantics | Himself | Documentary series about Yash Chopra ; episode: "The Boy from Jalandhar" | |
| 2024 | Angry Young Men | Himself | Documentary series about Salim–Javed | |
| 2024 | Yo Yo Honey Singh: Famous | Himself | Documentary series about Yo Yo Honey Singh | |
| 2024 | Nayanthara: Beyond the Fairytale | Himself | Documentary series about Nayanthara | |
| 2025 | The Roshans | Himself | Documentary series about Roshan Lal Nagrath, Rajesh Roshan, Hrithik Roshan | |
| 2025 | The Ba***ds of Bollywood | Himself | Cameo appearance | |

=== As host ===
| Year | Title | Notes | Ref. |
|---|---|---|---|
| 2003 | 48th Filmfare Awards | Television special | |
| 2004 | 49th Filmfare Awards | Television special | |
| 2005 | 6th International Indian Film Academy Awards | Television special | |
| 2006 | 2nd Global Indian Film Awards | Television special | |
| 2007 | 52nd Filmfare Awards | Television special | |
| 2007 | Kaun Banega Crorepati | Game show; season 3 | |
| 2008 | 53rd Filmfare Awards | Television special | |
| 2008 | Kya Aap Paanchvi Pass Se Tez Hain? | Game show | |
| 2010 | 16th Star Screen Awards | Television special | |
| 2010 | 55th Filmfare Awards | Television special | |
| 2010 | Indian Premiere League Awards | Television special | |
| 2010 | Sahara India Sports Awards 2010 | Television special | |
| 2011 | 17th Star Screen Awards | Television special | |
| 2011 | Zor Ka Jhatka: Total Wipeout | Game show | |
| 2012 | 18th Colors Screen Awards | Television special | |
| 2012 | 57th Filmfare Awards | Television special | |
| 2012 | Zee Cine Awards 2012 | Television special | |
| 2013 | 19th Colors Screen Awards | Television special | |
| 2013 | 58th Filmfare Awards | Television special | |
| 2013 | 14th International Indian Film Academy Awards | Television special | |
| 2014 | 20th Life OK Screen Awards | Television special | |
| 2015 | 21st Life OK Screen Awards | Television special | |
| 2015 | India Poochega Sabse Shaana Kaun? | Game show | |
| 2016 | 61st Filmfare Awards | Television special | |
| 2017 | 62nd Filmfare Awards | Television special | |
| 2017–2018 | TED Talks India Nayi Soch | Talk show | |
| 2018 | 63rd Filmfare Awards | Television special | |
| 2019 | 64th Filmfare Awards | Television special | |
| 2019 | TED Talks India Nayi Baat | Talk show | |
| 2024 | 24th IIFA Awards | Television special | |
| 2025 | 70th Filmfare Awards | Television special | |

== Music videos ==
| Title | Year | Performer | Album | Ref. |
|---|---|---|---|---|
| "Kya Khoya" | 2002 | Jagjit Singh | Samvedna | |
| "Phir Mile Sur Mera Tumhara" | 2010 | Various | — | |
| "Jai Hind India" | 2018 | AR Rahman,Nakul Abhyankar, MC Heam | — | |
| "BIBA" | 2019 | Shirley Setia, Dev Negi | BIBA | |
| "Sab Sahi Ho Jayega" | 2019 | Shahrukh Khan | — | |
| "Sapphire" | 2025 | Ed Sheeran, Arijit Singh | Play | |

== See also ==
- List of awards and nominations received by Shah Rukh Khan

== Bibliography ==
- Chopra, Anupama (2007). King of Bollywood: Shah Rukh Khan and the Seductive World of Indian Cinema. Warner Books. ISBN 978-0-446-50898-8.
- Patel, Bhaichand (2012). Bollywood's Top 20: Superstars of Indian Cinema. Penguin Books Limited. ISBN 978-81-8475-598-5.
- Basu, Anustup (2010). Bollywood in the Age of New Media: The Geo-televisual Aesthetic. Oxford University Press. ISBN 978-0-7486-8676-6.
- Gulzar; Nihalani, Govind; Chatterjee, Saibal (2003). Encyclopaedia of Hindi Cinema. Popular Prakashan. ISBN 978-81-7991-066-5.
- O'Brien, Derek (2014). Derek Introduces: 100 Iconic Indians. Rupa Publications. ISBN 978-81-291-3413-4. Archived from the original on 18 April 2023.
- Costanzo, William V. (2013). World Cinema through Global Genres. John Wiley & Sons. ISBN 978-1-118-71310-5.
- Bhattacharya Mehta, Rini; Pandharipande, Rajeshwari (2010). Bollywood and Globalization: Indian Popular Cinema, Nation, and Diaspora. Anthem Press. ISBN 978-1-84331-889-7.
