= List of awards and nominations received by Shah Rukh Khan =

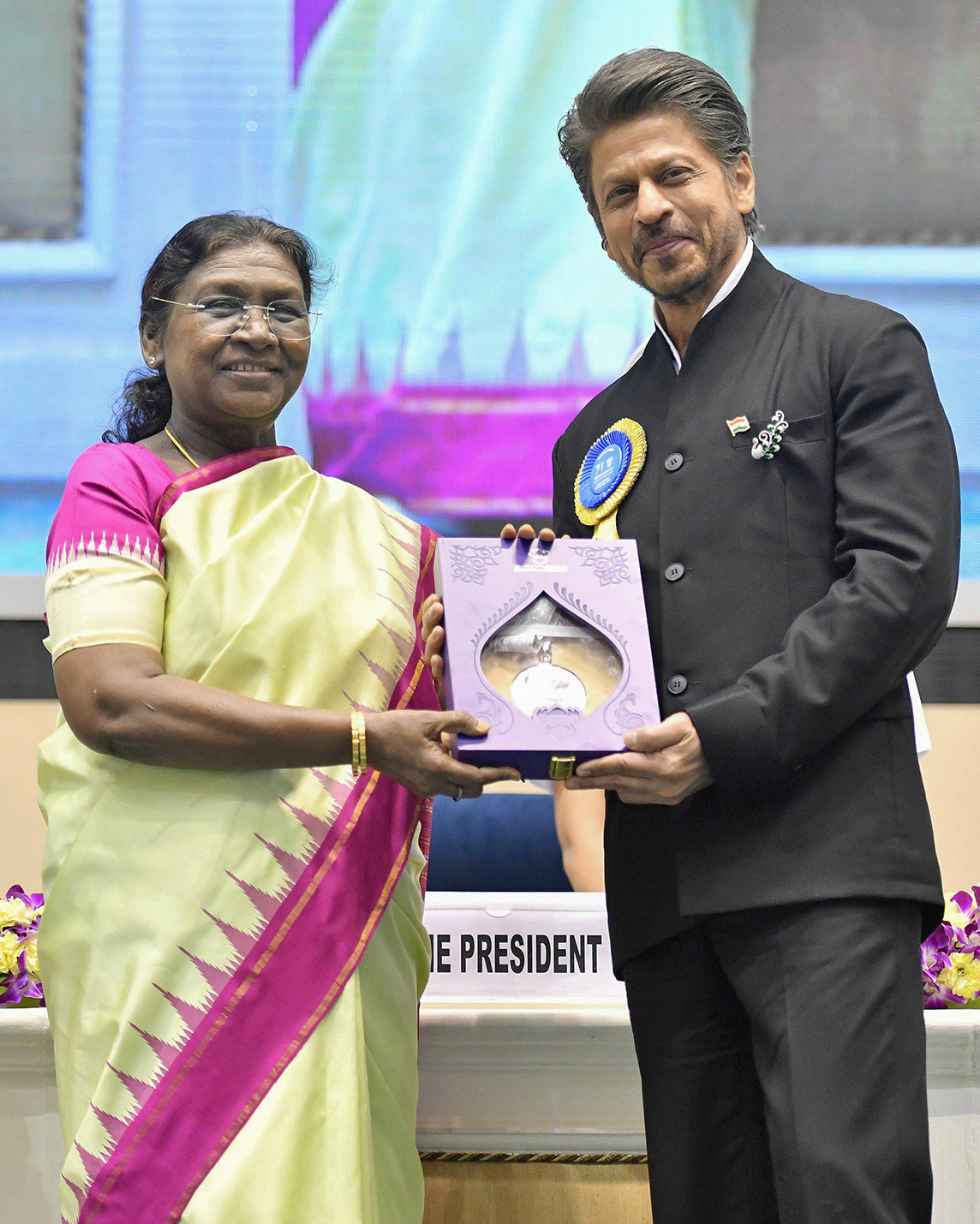
Khan winning the Best Actor award at 71st National Film Awards, 2025

Shah Rukh Khan is an Indian actor, film producer, and television personality predominantly known for his work in Bollywood. He is regarded as one of the biggest and most successful film stars in the world. He is the recipient of several awards, including a National Film Award, 15 Filmfare Awards, Screen Awards, Zee Cine Awards, and IIFA Awards. Besides acting awards, he has received a number of state honours, including the Padma Shri by the Government of India in 2005, the Ordre des Arts et des Lettres in 2007, and the Legion of Honour in 2014 (both by the Government of France).

Khan made his acting debut with a leading role in the romantic drama Deewana (1992), which won him the Filmfare Award for Best Male Debut. The next year he won his first Best Actor trophy for his portrayal of a murderer in Baazigar, and a Best Performance in a Negative Role nomination (both at Filmfare) for his performance as an obsessive lover in Darr. Khan's most significant release of the 1990s was Dilwale Dulhania Le Jayenge. He portrayed a non-resident Indian who falls in love with the character played by Kajol, for which he earned another Filmfare Award for Best Actor as well as his first Screen Award. Khan later won two consecutive Filmfare Awards in the Best Actor category for his performances in Dil To Pagal Hai (1997) and Kuch Kuch Hota Hai (1998), both films focusing on a love quadrangle.

In 2000, Khan won the Filmfare Critics Award for Best Actor for his performance in the starring role of a music teacher in Mohabbatein (2000), for which he was also nominated at the Screen and the IIFA Awards in the Best Actor category. For his performance as an alcoholic in Devdas, he received various Best Actor awards in India including Filmfare, IIFA, Screen, and Zee Cine Awards. Khan was nominated for a Filmfare Award for Best Actor for three of his 2004 releases: the masala film Main Hoon Na, the star-crossed romance Veer-Zaara, and the social drama Swades, winning for the lattermost. For his performance in Chak De! India (2007), in which he played the former captain of the India men's national field hockey team, he won Filmfare, IIFA, Screen, and Zee Cine awards in the Best Actor category.

Khan starred in My Name Is Khan (2010), a drama based on the 11 September attacks, as a Muslim man with Asperger syndrome. Acknowledged as being among his career's best work, the performance won him many awards, including Best Actor from Filmfare, IIFA, Producers Guild, and Screen awards. He later received the IIFA Award for Best Actor, the Screen Award for Best Actor (Popular Choice), and the Zee Cine Critics Award for Best Actor – Male for his portrayal in the action thriller Don 2 (2011), a sequel to the 2006 film Don for which he had also earned the nomination of Best Actor at the Asian Film Awards. He won three consecutive Screen Awards in the Best Actor (Popular Choice) category for portraying a traveler in Chennai Express (2013), a street fighter in Happy New Year (2014), and a car tuner in Dilwale (2015). For Khan's performance as a dwarf in the comedy-drama Zero (2018), he was nominated for the Filmfare Award for Best Actor. For his performance in Jawan (2023), Khan received his first National Film Award for Best Actor in a Leading Role and the IIFA Award for Best Actor.

== Awards and nominations ==
Award	Year	Category	Nominated work	Result	Ref(s)
Asian Film Awards	2007	Best Actor	Don	Nominated	
Asianet Film Awards	2012	Lifetime Achievement Award	—	Won	
Asianet Film Awards	2014	International Icon of Indian Cinema	—	Won	
Astra Film Awards	2024	Best International Feature	Jawan	Nominated	
BIG Star Entertainment Awards	2010	Film Actor of the Decade – Male	—	Won	
BIG Star Entertainment Awards	2010	Most Entertaining Film Actor – Male	My Name Is Khan	Nominated	
BIG Star Entertainment Awards	2011	Most Entertaining Film Actor – Male	Ra.One	Nominated	
BIG Star Entertainment Awards	2012	Most Entertaining Actor in a Romantic Film – Male	Jab Tak Hai Jaan	Won	
BIG Star Entertainment Awards	2012	Most Entertaining Film Actor – Male	Jab Tak Hai Jaan	Won	
BIG Star Entertainment Awards	2012	Most Entertaining On-screen Couple	Jab Tak Hai Jaan	Won (Note: Tied with Katrina Kaif)	
BIG Star Entertainment Awards	2012	Most Entertaining Actor in an Action Film – Male	Don 2	Nominated	
BIG Star Entertainment Awards	2013	Most Entertaining On-screen Couple	Chennai Express	Won (Note: Tied with Deepika Padukone)	
BIG Star Entertainment Awards	2013	Most Entertaining Film Actor – Male	Chennai Express	Won	
BIG Star Entertainment Awards	2013	Most Entertaining Actor in an Action Film – Male	Chennai Express	Nominated	
BIG Star Entertainment Awards	2013	Most Entertaining Actor in a Comedy Film – Male	Chennai Express	Nominated	
BIG Star Entertainment Awards	2014	Most Entertaining Film Actor – Male	Happy New Year	Won	
Bollywood Movie Awards	1999	Best Actor	Kuch Kuch Hota Hai	Won	
Bollywood Movie Awards	1999	Most Sensational Actor	Dil Se..	Won	
Bollywood Movie Awards	2002	Best Actor	Kabhi Khushi Kabhie Gham	Nominated	
Bollywood Movie Awards	2002	Best Actor (Critics)	Kabhi Khushi Kabhie Gham	Nominated	
Bollywood Movie Awards	2003	Best Actor	Devdas	Won	
Bollywood Movie Awards	2003	Best Actor (Critics)	Devdas	Nominated	
Bollywood Movie Awards	2003	Most Sensational Actor	Devdas	Nominated	
Bollywood Movie Awards	2005	Best Actor	Veer-Zaara	Won	
Bollywood Movie Awards	2006	Best Actor	Paheli	Nominated	
Bollywood Movie Awards	2007	Best Actor	Kabhi Alvida Naa Kehna	Nominated	
Bollywood Movie Awards	2007	Best Villain	Don	Nominated	
CNN-News18 Indian of the Year	2023	Indian of the Year - Popular Choice	—	Won	
ETC Bollywood Business Awards	2012	Most Profitable Actor – Male	—	Won	
ETC Bollywood Business Awards	2013	Most Profitable Actor – Male	—	Won	
FICCI Frames Excellence Honours	2009	Most Powerful Entertainer of the Decade	—	Won	
FICCI Frames Excellence Honours	2010	Global Entertainer of the Year	—	Won	
FICCI Frames Excellence Honours	2011	Best Actor	My Name Is Khan	Won	
Filmfare Awards	1993	Best Male Debut	Deewana	Won	
Filmfare Awards	1994	Best Actor	Baazigar	Won	
Filmfare Awards	1994	Best Performance in a Negative Role	Darr	Nominated	
Filmfare Awards	1994	Best Actor (Critics)	Kabhi Haan Kabhi Naa	Won	
Filmfare Awards	1995	Best Performance in a Negative Role	Anjaam	Won	
Filmfare Awards	1996	Best Actor	Dilwale Dulhania Le Jayenge	Won	
Filmfare Awards	1998	Best Actor	Dil To Pagal Hai	Won	
Filmfare Awards	1998	Best Actor	Yes Boss	Nominated	
Filmfare Awards	1999	Best Actor	Kuch Kuch Hota Hai	Won	
Filmfare Awards	1999	Best Performance in a Negative Role	Duplicate	Nominated	
Filmfare Awards	2000	Best Performance in a Comic Role	Baadshah	Nominated	
Filmfare Awards	2001	Best Actor	Mohabbatein	Nominated	
Filmfare Awards	2001	Best Actor (Critics)	Mohabbatein	Won	
Filmfare Awards	2002	Best Actor	Kabhi Khushi Kabhie Gham	Nominated	
Filmfare Awards	2002	Best Film	Asoka	Nominated	
Filmfare Awards	2003	Best Actor	Devdas	Won	
Filmfare Awards	2003	Swiss Consulate Special Award	—	Won	
Filmfare Awards	2004	Power Award	—	Won (Note: Tied with Amitabh Bachchan)	
Filmfare Awards	2004	Best Actor	Kal Ho Naa Ho	Nominated	
Filmfare Awards	2005	Best Actor	Main Hoon Na	Nominated	
Filmfare Awards	2005	Best Actor	Swades	Won	
Filmfare Awards	2005	Best Actor	Veer-Zaara	Nominated	
Filmfare Awards	2005	Power Award	—	Won	
Filmfare Awards	2007	Best Actor	Don	Nominated	
Filmfare Awards	2007	Best Actor	Kabhi Alvida Naa Kehna	Nominated	
Filmfare Awards	2008	Best Actor	Chak De! India	Won	
Filmfare Awards	2008	Best Actor	Om Shanti Om	Nominated	
Filmfare Awards	2009	Best Actor	Rab Ne Bana Di Jodi	Nominated	
Filmfare Awards	2011	Best Actor	My Name Is Khan	Won	
Filmfare Awards	2012	Best Film	Don 2	Nominated	
Filmfare Awards	2012	Best Actor	Don 2	Nominated	
Filmfare Awards	2013	Best Actor	Jab Tak Hai Jaan	Nominated	
Filmfare Awards	2014	Best Actor	Chennai Express	Nominated	
Filmfare Awards	2016	Best Actor	Dilwale	Nominated	
Filmfare Awards	2017	Best Actor	Fan	Nominated	
Filmfare Awards	2018	Best Actor	Raees	Nominated	
Filmfare Awards	2019	Best Actor	Zero	Nominated	
Filmfare Awards	2024	Best Actor	Jawan	Nominated	
Filmfare Awards	2024	Best Actor	Dunki	Nominated	
Global Indian Film Awards	2005	Best Actor	Swades	Won	
Global Indian Film Awards	2007	Most Searched Actor on the internet	—	Won	
Global Indian Film Awards	2007	Best Actor	Kabhi Alvida Naa Kehna	Nominated	
International Indian Film Academy Awards	2001	Best Actor	Mohabbatein	Nominated	
International Indian Film Academy Awards	2002	Best Actor	Kabhi Khushi Kabhie Gham	Nominated	
International Indian Film Academy Awards	2003	Best Actor	Devdas	Won	
International Indian Film Academy Awards	2004	Best Actor	Kal Ho Naa Ho	Nominated	
International Indian Film Academy Awards	2005	Best Actor	Swades	Nominated	
International Indian Film Academy Awards	2005	Best Actor	Veer-Zaara	Won	
International Indian Film Academy Awards	2006	Best Actor	Paheli	Nominated	
International Indian Film Academy Awards	2007	Best Actor	Don	Nominated	
International Indian Film Academy Awards	2007	Best Actor	Kabhi Alvida Naa Kehna	Nominated	
International Indian Film Academy Awards	2008	Best Actor	Chak De! India	Won	
International Indian Film Academy Awards	2009	Star of the Decade – Male	—	Won	
International Indian Film Academy Awards	2009	Best Actor	Rab Ne Bana Di Jodi	Nominated	
International Indian Film Academy Awards	2011	Best Actor	My Name Is Khan	Won	
International Indian Film Academy Awards	2012	Best Actor	Don 2	Nominated	
International Indian Film Academy Awards	2013	Digital Star of the Year	—	Won	
International Indian Film Academy Awards	2013	Best Actor	Jab Tak Hai Jaan	Nominated	
International Indian Film Academy Awards	2014	Best Actor	Chennai Express	Nominated	
International Indian Film Academy Awards	2015	Best Actor	Happy New Year	Nominated	
International Indian Film Academy Awards	2017	Best Actor	Fan	Nominated	
International Indian Film Academy Awards	2023	Best Supporting Actor	Brahmāstra: Part One – Shiva	Nominated	
International Indian Film Academy Awards	2024	Best Actor	Jawan	Won	
Indian Television Academy Awards	2008	Best Anchor – Game/Quiz Show	Kya Aap Paanchvi Pass Se Tez Hain?	Won	
Indian Telly Awards	2007	Best Anchor	Kaun Banega Crorepati 3	Won	
Indian Telly Awards	2008	Best Anchor	Kya Aap Paanchvi Pass Se Tez Hain?	Nominated	
Locarno Film Festival	2024	Pardo alla Carriera Ascona-Locarno Tourism	—	Won	
Mirchi Music Awards	2014	Face of Romantic Music	—	Won	
National Film Awards	2025	Best Actor	Jawan	Won	
NDTV Indian of the Year Awards	2008	NDTV Special Award	—	Won	
NDTV Indian of the Year Awards	2010	India's Icon of Last 21 Years in Entertainment	—	Won	
NDTV Profit Business Leadership Awards	2012	Creative Entrepreneur of the Year	—	Won	
Nickelodeon Kids' Choice Awards India	2013	Best Actor	Chennai Express	Won	
Nickelodeon Kids' Choice Awards India	2016	Kids' Icon of The Year	—	Won	
Producers Guild Film Awards	2004	Best Actor in a Leading Role	Kal Ho Naa Ho	Nominated	
Producers Guild Film Awards	2005	Best Actor in a Leading Role	Swades	Nominated	
Producers Guild Film Awards	2008	Best Actor in a Leading Role	Chak De! India	Won	
Producers Guild Film Awards	2008	Best Anchor	Kaun Banega Crorepati 3	Nominated	
Producers Guild Film Awards	2010	Best Actor in a Leading Role	Rab Ne Bana Di Jodi	Won	
Producers Guild Film Awards	2011	Hindustan Times Reader's Choice Entertainer of the Year – Male	—	Won	
Producers Guild Film Awards	2011	Best Actor in a Leading Role	My Name Is Khan	Nominated	
Producers Guild Film Awards	2012	Hindustan Times Reader's Choice Entertainer of the Year – Male	—	Won	
Producers Guild Film Awards	2012	Best Actor in a Leading Role	Don 2	Nominated	
Producers Guild Film Awards	2013	Best Actor in a Leading Role	Jab Tak Hai Jaan	Nominated	
Producers Guild Film Awards	2014	Renault Star Guild Entertainer of the Year	—	Won	
Producers Guild Film Awards	2015	Best Actor in a Leading Role	Happy New Year	Nominated	
Sansui Viewers' Choice Movie Awards	1998	Best Actor	Dil To Pagal Hai	Won	
Sansui Viewers' Choice Movie Awards	1999	Best Actor	Kuch Kuch Hota Hai	Won	
Sansui Viewers' Choice Movie Awards	2001	Best Actor	Mohabbatein	Won	
Sansui Viewers' Choice Movie Awards	2002	Best Actor (Jury)	Aśoka	Won	
Sansui Viewers' Choice Movie Awards	2003	Best Actor	Devdas	Won	
Sansui Viewers' Choice Movie Awards	2004	Best Actor	Kal Ho Naa Ho	Nominated	
Sansui Viewers' Choice Movie Awards	2004	Best Actor (Jury)	Kal Ho Naa Ho	Won	
Screen Awards	1996	Best Actor	Dilwale Dulhania Le Jayenge	Won	
Screen Awards	1998	Best Actor	Dil To Pagal Hai	Nominated	
Screen Awards	1999	Best Actor	Kuch Kuch Hota Hai	Nominated	
Screen Awards	2001	Best Actor	Mohabbatein	Nominated	
Screen Awards	2002	Best Actor	Kabhi Khushi Kabhie Gham	Nominated	
Screen Awards	2002	Jodi No. 1	Kabhi Khushi Kabhie Gham	Won (Note: Tied with Kajol)	
Screen Awards	2003	Best Actor	Devdas	Won	
Screen Awards	2003	Jodi No. 1	Devdas	Won (Note: Tied with Aishwarya Rai Bachchan)	
Screen Awards	2004	Best Actor	Chalte Chalte	Nominated	
Screen Awards	2005	Best Actor	Veer-Zaara	Won	
Screen Awards	2005	Jodi No. 1	Veer-Zaara	Won (Note: Tied with Preity Zinta)	
Screen Awards	2006	Best Actor	Paheli	Nominated	
Screen Awards	2007	Best Actor	Kabhi Alvida Naa Kehna	Nominated	
Screen Awards	2007	Jodi No. 1	Kabhi Alvida Naa Kehna	Won (Note: Tied with Rani Mukerji)	
Screen Awards	2007	Best Actor in a Negative Role	Don	Nominated	
Screen Awards	2008	Best Actor	Chak De! India	Won	
Screen Awards	2008	Jodi No. 1	Om Shanti Om	Won	
Screen Awards	2009	Best Actor	Rab Ne Bana Di Jodi	Nominated	
Screen Awards	2010	Jodi of the Decade	—	Won	
Screen Awards	2011	Best Actor	My Name Is Khan	Nominated	
Screen Awards	2011	Best Actor (Popular Choice)	My Name Is Khan	Won	
Screen Awards	2012	Best Actor	Don 2	Nominated	
Screen Awards	2012	Best Actor (Popular Choice)	Don 2	Won	
Screen Awards	2012	Jodi No. 1	Don 2	Won	
Screen Awards	2013	Best Actor	Jab Tak Hai Jaan	Nominated	
Screen Awards	2013	Best Actor (Popular Choice)	Jab Tak Hai Jaan	Nominated	
Screen Awards	2014	Best Actor	Chennai Express	Nominated	
Screen Awards	2014	Best Actor (Popular Choice)	Chennai Express	Won	
Screen Awards	2015	Best Actor	Happy New Year	Nominated	
Screen Awards	2015	Best Actor (Popular Choice)	Happy New Year	Won	
Screen Awards	2016	Best Actor (Popular Choice)	Dilwale	Won	
Screen Awards	2016	Jodi No. 1	Dilwale	Won	
Sharjah International Book Fair	2022	Special Honoured with Global Icon of Cinema and Cultural Narrative Award for his Contribution as the International Icon of Cinema and Culture	—	Won	
Stardust Awards	2004	Actor of the Year – Male	Kal Ho Naa Ho	Nominated	
Stardust Awards	2005	Actor of the Year – Male	Swades	Nominated	
Stardust Awards	2007	Actor of the Year – Male	Kabhi Alvida Naa Kehna	Nominated	
Stardust Awards	2007	Best Actor in a Negative Role	Don	Nominated	
Stardust Awards	2008	Actor of the Year – Male	Chak De! India	Nominated	
Stardust Awards	2008	Actor of the Year – Male	Om Shanti Om	Nominated	
Stardust Awards	2009	Actor of the Year – Male	Rab Ne Bana Di Jodi	Nominated	
Stardust Awards	2011	Best Actor in a Drama	My Name Is Khan	Nominated	
Stardust Awards	2011	Best Film - Drama	My Name Is Khan	Won	
Stardust Awards	2012	Actor of the Year – Male	Don 2	Nominated	
Stardust Awards	2012	Best Actor in a Thriller or Action	Don 2 and Ra.One	Nominated	
Stardust Awards	2013	Actor of the Year – Male	Jab Tak Hai Jaan	Won	
Stardust Awards	2013	Best Actor (Editor's Choice)	Jab Tak Hai Jaan	Won	
Stardust Awards	2013	Best Actor in a Comedy or Romance	Jab Tak Hai Jaan	Nominated	
Stardust Awards	2014	Actor of the Year – Male	Happy New Year	Won	
Stardust Awards	2014	Best Actor in a Thriller or Action	Happy New Year	Won	
Stardust Awards	2014	Best Film of the year	Happy New Year	Won	
Stardust Awards	2016	Actor of the Year – Male	Fan	Nominated	
Stardust Awards	2016	Best Actor (Editor's Choice)	Fan	Won	
Stardust Awards	2016	Best Actor in a Thriller or Action	Fan	Won	
Stardust Awards	2016	Best Supporting Actor	Dear Zindagi	Nominated	
Stardust Awards	2017	Best Actor	Raees	Won	
The Asian Awards	2015	Outstanding Contribution to Cinema	—	Won	
Vijay Awards	2013	Chevalier Sivaji Ganesan Award for Excellence in Indian Cinema	—	Won	
Vijay Awards	2014	Entertainer of Indian Cinema	—	Won	
Zee Cine Awards	1998	Best Actor – Male	Dil To Pagal Hai	Won	
Zee Cine Awards	1998	Best Actor – Male	Pardes	Nominated	
Zee Cine Awards	1999	Best Actor – Male	Duplicate	Nominated	
Zee Cine Awards	1999	Best Actor – Male	Kuch Kuch Hota Hai	Won	
Zee Cine Awards	2000	Best Actor – Male	Baadshah	Nominated	
Zee Cine Awards	2001	Best Actor – Male	Mohabbatein	Nominated	
Zee Cine Awards	2002	Best Actor – Male	Kabhi Khushi Kabhie Gham	Nominated	
Zee Cine Awards	2003	Best Actor – Male	Devdas	Won	
Zee Cine Awards	2004	Best Actor – Male	Kal Ho Naa Ho	Nominated	
Zee Cine Awards	2005	Best Actor – Male	Main Hoon Na	Nominated	
Zee Cine Awards	2005	Best Actor – Male	Swades	Nominated	
Zee Cine Awards	2005	Best Actor – Male	Veer-Zaara	Won	
Zee Cine Awards	2006	Best Actor – Male	Paheli	Nominated	
Zee Cine Awards	2007	Fun Cinema Entertainer of the Year	Don	Won	
Zee Cine Awards	2007	Best Actor – Male	Don	Nominated	
Zee Cine Awards	2007	Best Actor – Male	Kabhi Alvida Naa Kehna	Nominated	
Zee Cine Awards	2008	Best Actor – Male	Chak De! India	Won	
Zee Cine Awards	2008	Best Actor – Male	Om Shanti Om	Nominated	
Zee Cine Awards	2008	Zee Icon Award	—	Nominated	
Zee Cine Awards	2011	Best Actor – Male	My Name Is Khan	Won	
Zee Cine Awards	2011	International Male Icon	—	Nominated	
Zee Cine Awards	2012	Critics Award for Best Actor – Male	Don 2	Won	
Zee Cine Awards	2012	Best Actor – Male	Don 2	Nominated	
Zee Cine Awards	2012	Best Actor – Male	Ra.One	Nominated	
Zee Cine Awards	2013	Best Actor – Male	Jab Tak Hai Jaan	Nominated	
Zee Cine Awards	2013	International Male Icon	—	Won	
Zee Cine Awards	2014	Best Actor – Male	Chennai Express	Won	
Zee Cine Awards	2018	Best Actor – Male	Raees	Nominated	
Zee Cine Awards	2018	Special Honour for Contribution to Cinema and TV over the Last 25 Years	—	Won	
Zee Cine Awards	2024	Best Actor – Male	Jawan	Won	

== State honours ==
Country or organization	Year	Award	Ref(s)
France	2007	Ordre des Arts et des Lettres	
France	2014	Legion of Honour	
India	1997	Best Indian Citizen Award	
India	2002	Rajiv Gandhi Award	
India	2005	Padma Shri	
Indian Television Academy	2017	Yash Chopra National Memorial Award	
South Korea	2009	Honorary Black Belt of Taekwondo	
Yale University	2012	Chubb Fellowship	
La Trobe University	2019	Honorary Doctorate	
Malaysia	2008	Darjah Mulia Seri Melaka	
Malaysia	2012	BrandLaureate Legendary Award	
Maulana Azad National Urdu University	2016	Honorary Doctorate	
Morocco	2011	L'Étoile d'Or	
Morocco	2012	Wissame al-Kafaa al-Fikria	
UNESCO	2011	Pyramide con Marni Award	
United Kingdom	2014	Global Diversity Award	
University of Bedfordshire	2009	Honorary Doctorate	
University of Edinburgh	2015	Honorary Doctorate	
University of Law	2019	Honorary Doctorate	
World Economic Forum	2018	Crystal Award	
