= Raj Kumar Kapoor =

Indian film director and producer (c. 1932 – 2019)

- Born: c. 1932
- Died: 10 April 2019 (aged 86–87)
- Occupations: Actor; Producer; Director; Army officer
- Relatives: Chunky Pandey (nephew)

Raj Kumar Kapoor (c. 1932 – 10 April 2019) was an Indian actor, producer and director. He was a colonel in Indian Army. He was also known as Raj Bharti and many movies credited this name.

== Biography ==
Kapoor was the director of a television series titled Fauji which was the debut work of Shah Rukh Khan. He also produced Oonche Log. He was involved in acting in films too. He directed and acted in the memorable 1980s ketchup advertisement with the line "Isme kaddu nahi zara” (There is no pumpkin in this) and was known as the "ketchup man". He authored a novel titled When Shiva Smiles.

Kapoor died on 10 April 2019 at the age of 87.

Through his sister, his nephew is actor Chunky Panday.

== Selected filmography ==
=== Actor ===
- Hanste Zakhm (1973)
- Lahu Ke Do Rang (1979) as Dr Banerjee
- Qurbani (1980) as Khan Baba
- Dostana (1980)
- Do Premee (1980) as Mahayogi/Shivlal/Dragon, Smuggler
- Partner (1982)
- Yeh Nazdeekiyan (1982) as Deepak Kapoor
- Dard Ka Rishta (1982) as Pathan Khan, Security Guard
- Angoor (1982) as Inspector Sinha.
- Chatpati (1983)
- Yahan Wahan (1984) .... Mr Kapoor
- Inteha (1984)
- Jawaab (1985)
- Surkhiyaan (1985) as Police Commissioner
- Baazigar (1993) as Police Commissioner
- Broken Silence (1995)
- Dillagi (1999)

=== Producer ===
- Oonche Log (1985)

=== Director ===
- Fauji (1988–89)
