= Stardust Award for Best Actor in a Thriller or Action =

Film award in India

The Stardust Best Thriller/Action Actor is chosen by the readers of the annual Stardust magazine. The award honours a star that has made an impact with their acting in that certain film.

Here is a list of the award winners and the films for which they won.

Year	Actor	Film
2011	Ajay Devgn	Once Upon a Time in Mumbaai
2012	Ajay Devgn	Singham
2013	Akshay Kumar	Rowdy Rathore & Khiladi 786
2014	no award	no award
2015	Shah Rukh Khan	Happy New Year
2016	Shah Rukh Khan	Fan

== See also ==
- Stardust Awards
- Bollywood
- Cinema of India
