= TED Talks India =

2017–2019 Indian TV series

- Also known as: TED Talks India Nayi Soch; TED Talks India Nayi Baat
- Genre: Talk show
- Created by: TED Conferences, LLC
- Presented by: Shah Rukh Khan
- Country of origin: India
- Original language: Hindi
- No. of seasons: 2
- No. of episodes: 16

Production
- Running time: 60 minutes
- Production company: TED Conferences, LLC

Original release
- Network: STAR Plus
- Release: 10 December 2017 – 24 November 2019

TED Talks India (originally known as TED Talks India Nayi Soch (season 1) and also known as TED Talks India Nayi Baat (season 2)) is an Indian talk show hosted by Shah Rukh Khan, that premiered on StarPlus. The slogan of the show is "Don't kill ideas".

== Series overview ==
Season	No. of episodes	Originally broadcast (India)	
Season	No. of episodes	First aired	Last aired
1	8	10 December 2017	28 January 2018
2	8	2 November 2019	24 November 2019

== Episodes ==
=== Season 1 ===
In every episode, there are guest speakers who shares new ideas. Special appearance speakers are Javed Akhtar, Jasmeen Patheja, Karan Johar, Bittu Sahgal, Vikas Khanna, Sundar Pichai, Ekta Kapoor and Shubha Tole, Sarover Zaidi etc.

Episode list
No.	Title	Original release date
1	"Re-imagining India"	10 December 2017
2	"Power of Words"	17 December 2017
In the second episode, 'Power of Words' is the underlying theme. Speakers: Javed Akhtar, life skills educator Deepak Ramola, child and adolescent psychologist Shelja Sen, college student and social media campaigner Gurmehar Kaur (daughter of Kashmir martyr Captain Mandeep Singh) and founder-CEO, Uniphore, Umesh Sachdev. Performers: Clinton Cerejo
3	"Badalte Rishte"	24 December 2017
This episode talks about our relationships with each other, the society, with machines, with the world and most importantly, with ourselves. Speakers: Disruptive artist Jasmeen Patheja, artist and photographer Samar Singh Jodha, filmmaker Karan Johar, innovator-social entrepreneur Trisha Prabhu and environmental activist-writer Bittu Sahgal. Performers: Sivamani
4	"Dekho Aanewala Kal"	31 December 2017
One always lives with the hope of a, and for a better 'Tomorrow' – and that is the theme for this episode. Speakers: CEO, Google Inc. Sundar Pichai, designer and inventor Anab Jain, Senior Manager, AI Science for Alexa, Ashwin Ram, Co-founder of SocialCops, Data Intelligence Company, Prukalpa Sankar, Sciences and Aerospace Engineer and Deputy Director, Mars Orbiter Mission, Ritu Karidhal. Performers: Piano star Lydian Nadhaswaram and singer Shalmali Kholgade
5	"Power to Women"	7 January 2018
The underlying theme is "Meri Marzi #PowerToWomen". Speakers: Film and TV producer Ekta Kapoor, co-founder of the #100sareepact Anju Kadam, medical officer Dr Ramindar Dhillon, engineer, innovator, and entrepreneur Mihir Shah, and the captain of the Indian women's cricket team Mithali Raj. Performers: Nritarutya Dance Company, featuring Chandana Bala
6	"Wonder of Learning"	14 January 2018
In this episode, we have a mix of speakers sharing their thoughts on learning. Speakers: Neuroscientist Dr Shubha Tole; astrophysicist Dr Karan Jani; founder and CEO of Blippar Ambarish Mitra; cyber security expert Jagdish Mahapatra, and education scientist Sugata Mitra. Performers: Prahlad Tipanya

== Season 2 ==
Season 2 of the show named as TED Talks India Nayi Baat premiered on 2 November 2019 and ended on 24 November 2019 in Star Plus. The last episode titled Ed Tech was host by Karan Johar.

== See also ==
- TED (conference)
