= Malacca honours list =

Malacca is one of the states in Malaysia that awards honours and titles.

== 2004 ==
- Abdullah Badawi is sole recipient of the Darjah Utama Negeri Melaka (DUNM), which carries the title "Datuk Seri Utama".
- 5 recipients of the Darjah Gemilang Seri Melaka (DGSM), which carries the title "Datuk Seri".
- 5 recipients of the Darjah Cemerlang Seri Melaka (DCSM), which carries the title "Datuk Wira".
- 73 recipients of the Darjah Mulia Seri Melaka (DMSM), which carries the title "Datuk".

== 2003 ==
- Datin Seri Dr Siti Hasmah Mohd Ali is sole recipient of the Darjah Utama Negeri Melaka (DUNM), which carries the title "Datuk Seri Utama".
- 2 recipients of the Darjah Gemilang Seri Melaka (DGSM), which carries the title "Datuk Seri".
- 3 recipients of the Darjah Cemerlang Seri Melaka (DCSM), which carries the title "Datuk Wira".
- 46 recipients of the Darjah Mulia Seri Melaka (DMSM), which carries the title "Datuk"

== 2002 ==
- 1 recipient Darjah Gemilang Seri Melaka (DGSM), which carries the title "Datuk Seri"
- 5 recipients of the Darjah Cemerlang Seri Melaka (DCSM), which carries the title "Datuk Wira".
- 72 recipients of the Darjah Mulia Seri Melaka (DMSM), which carries the title "Datuk".
