= Stardust Award for Best Film of the Year =

Film award in India

The Stardust Hottest Film is chosen by the readers of the annual Stardust magazine. The award honours a star that has made an impact with their acting in that certain film.

== List of winners ==
| Year | Film | Producer/Production |
|---|---|---|
| 2004 | Kaante | White Feature Films, PNC Films |
| 2006 | Black | Sanjay Leela Bhansali |
| 2007 | Rang De Basanti | Rakeysh Omprakash Mehra |
| 2008 | Jab We Met | Dhillin Mehta |
| 2009 | Singh Is Kinng | Vipul Amrutlal Shah |
| 2010 | Love Aaj Kal | Saif Ali Khan |
| 2011 | Dabangg | Arbaaz Khan |
| 2012 | The Dirty Picture | Balaji Motion Pictures |
| 2013 | Barfi!, April & May 2011 As Travel Joiner | UTV Motion Pictures, Excel Entertainment |
| 2014 | Happy New Year | Gauri Khan |
| 2015 | Bajrangi Bhaijaan | Salman Khan |
| 2016 | Sultan | Aditya Chopra |
| 2017 | Guest Iin London | Ashwni Dhir |

== See also ==
- Stardust Awards
- Bollywood
- Cinema of India
