= Fauji (TV series) =

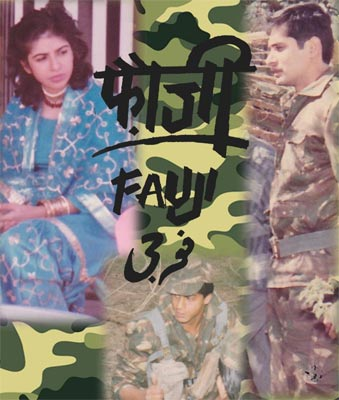
- Genre: Action
- Directed by: Lt. Col. Raj Kumar Kapoor
- Starring: Rakesh Sharma; Amina Shervani; Shah Rukh Khan; Manjula Avtar; Vikram Chopra
- Opening theme: "Fauji"
- Composer: Loy Mendonsa
- Country of origin: India
- Original language: Hindi
- No. of episodes: 13

Production
- Running time: Approx. 24 minutes

Original release
- Network: DD National
- Release: 18 January 1989 – 1989

Fauji (translation: "Soldier") is an Indian Hindi-language television series following the training of an Indian Army commando regiment; It was Shah Rukh Khan's debut in television. It aired on DD National in 1989, produced by New Film Addicts. It was directed by Raj Kumar Kapoor.

The story follows a new set of recruits as they begin their training to become commandos in the Indian Army. It is about the Indian Army Para SF training. The series shows the daily struggles of the recruits including physical training, the pranks they play on each other, and the punishments they receive from their officers.

Originally, Rakesh Sharma who played the role of Vikram Rai was supposed to be the hero of the serial. Shah Rukh Khan's character Abhimanyu Rai ( based on Col Sanjoy Banerjee of the Bengal Sappers, Indian Army), was supposed to have been the second lead. However Lt. Col. Raj Kumar Kapoor said in an interview that the camera “loved him so much” that they had to change the script to prop up Khan as the lead.

Initially, Khan's role in the serial was to count the crows. He said, “I landed up on the sets of ‘Fauji’, because the house-owner that we were speaking to after we needed a smaller house post the demise of my father, got to know that I'd been in Mumbai to act, and he revealed that his own father-in-law was producing a TV serial.

"When I went there, Colonel Kapoor (producer-director) offered me this sweet role, where I make a mistake and the Major would ask me to go a tree and count the number of crows in it. Once I reveal there are four, he asks me to be ‘Saavdhaan’. I was embarrassed to go back and tell my mother that my role was all about counting crows.”

Vishwajeet Pradhan also made his debut with this serial.

== Cast ==
- Rakesh Sharma as Maj. Vikram "Vicky" Rai
- Amina Shervani as Kiran Kochar
- Shah Rukh Khan as Lt. Abhimanyu Rai
- Manjula Avtar as Capt. Madhu Rathore
- Vishwajeet Pradhan as N/Sub. Yaseen Khan
- Sanjay Taneja as Nk. Kishore
- Vikram Chopra as Lt. Varuneshwar Singhji Parmeshwar Singhji Chauhan
- Gautam Bharadwaj as Lt. Peter Monteiro
- Jayshree Arora as Abhimanyu's mother
- A. Kannan as Maj. K. G. Narayanan
- Ajay Trihan as Lt. Devender Singh
- Sonal Dabral as Lt. Arun
- Nikhil Dewan
- Neeraj Joshi as Lt. Neeraj
- Anupama Sahni as Parvati
- Sunil Bindrani as the best hero

Now all the episodes are available on Amazon Prime, YouTube and Jio Cinema.

== Episodes ==
| No. | Title | Original release date |
|---|---|---|
| 1 | "Kadam Mila" (transl. Find the pace) | |
| 2 | "Fauji Bhai" (transl. Soldier brother) | |
| 3 | "Zameeni Nishaan" (transl. Mark on the earth) | |
| 4 | "Vikram Breaks Down" | |
| 5 | "Savadhan (transl. Attention)" | |
| 6 | "Hilo Maat (transl. Don't Move)" | |
| 7 | "Takkar (transl. Collision)" | |
| 8 | "Rafataar (transl. Speed)" | |
| 9 | "Parvati's Marriage" | |
| 10 | "Himmat (transl. Courage)" (transl. Bravery) | |
| 11 | "Real Danger" | |
| 12 | "The War Begins" | |
| 13 | "Fauji (transl. Soldier)" | |
