= Kya Aap Paanchvi Pass Se Tez Hain? =

- Promotional poster
- Also known as: Paanchvi Pass, Paanchvi Ki Class
- Directed by: Gagandeep Bijraniya
- Presented by: Shah Rukh Khan
- Starring: Shrishti Srivastava
- Opening theme: "Kya Aap Paanchvi Pass Se Tez Hain?" by Shankar–Ehsaan–Loy
- Country of origin: India
- Original languages: Hindi, English
- No. of seasons: 1
- No. of episodes: 37

Production
- Producers: Siddhartha Basu, Akash Sharma, Ramit Bharti Mittal
- Running time: Approx. 60 min (with commercials)
- Production companies: Bulldog Media & Entertainment

Original release
- Network: STAR Plus
- Release: 25 April – 27 July 2008

Kya Aap Paanchvi Pass Se Tez Hain? (transl. Are You Smarter Than Someone Who Passed the Fifth Grade?) is a game show hosted by leading Bollywood actor Shahrukh Khan. It is the Indian version of the popular American game show, Are You Smarter than a 5th Grader?, created by Mark Burnett, and was telecast on Indian Television channel STAR Plus. The show premiered on 25 April 2008 and the last episode was telecast on 27 July 2008 with Lalu Prasad Yadav as the special guest. The top prize was ₹5 crore (equivalent to ₹14 crore or US$1.4 million in 2023).

The Indian series was licensed by Bulldog Media & Entertainment.

== Cheats ==
The show used "cheats" based on the American show. Each cheat may be used once per game.

- Taak Jhank (peek): the contestant had the opportunity to review his or her current teammate's answer before submitting his or her own
- Copy: the contestant could choose to use his or her teammate's answer.
- Bachao (save): This cheat was triggered automatically if the contestant gave a wrong answer. If the contestant's current partner had the correct answer, the contestant was then saved.

Cheats are not available for use in the bonus (final) question.

== Teammates ==
The teammates were five school aged children chosen by the producers of the show. Each child could be used for assistance on two questions, excluding the bonus question.

=== The five possible teammates ===
- Shriya Sharma
- Dheirya Sorecha from Mumbai, Maharashtra
- Anubhav Motilal from Delhi
- Shreeparna Ghoshal from Delhi
- Milanjeet Singh Bhatti from Chandigarh
- Taruni Sachdev (replaced Shriya for one episode)

== Homework questions ==
This show also posed homework questions, offering ₹100,000 (equivalent to ₹280,000 or US$2,900 in 2023) to a viewer selected by draw who correctly answered a question asked at the end of the show.

== Payout structure ==
Prize amounts
1	2	3	4	5 (safe level)	6	7	8	9	10	Final Win (Bonus)
₹ 10,000	₹ 20,000	₹ 50,000	₹ 1,00,000	₹ 2,00,000	₹ 5,00,000	₹ 10,00,000	₹ 20,00,000	₹ 50,00,000	₹ 1 crore	₹ 5 crore

Giving the correct answer to their fifth question guarantees the contestant leaves with at least ₹ 2 lakh. The contestant may walk away ("drop out") at any question after the first to end the game and keep their winnings. Only the subject of the final question is shown. This is the contestant's final opportunity to walk away with ₹ 1 crore. If they choose to see the final question, they will have to risk ₹ 98 lakh and cannot walk away or seek help from teammates.
