= Happy New Year (2014 film) =

2014 Indian film by Farah Khan

- Theatrical release poster
- Directed by: Farah Khan
- Screenplay by: Farah Khan; Althea Kaushal
- Dialogues by: Mayur Puri
- Story by: Farah Khan
- Produced by: Gauri Khan
- Starring: Deepika Padukone; Shah Rukh Khan; Jackie Shroff; Abhishek Bachchan; Sonu Sood; Boman Irani; Vivaan Shah
- Cinematography: Manush Nandan
- Edited by: Anand Subaya; Tushar Parekh
- Music by: Songs: Vishal–Shekhar; Guest Composition: Dr. Zeus and RDB; Score: John Stewart Eduri
- Production company: Red Chillies Entertainment
- Distributed by: Yash Raj Films
- Release dates: 23 October 2014 (Dubai); 24 October 2014 (India); 31 December 2014 (France); 20 January 2015 (United Kingdom)
- Running time: 178 minutes
- Country: India
- Language: Hindi
- Budget: ₹150 crore
- Box office: ₹342 crore

Happy New Year (abbreviated as HNY: 2014) is a 2014 Indian Hindi-language heist action comedy film written and directed by Farah Khan and produced by Gauri Khan under Red Chillies Entertainment. The film features an ensemble cast of Deepika Padukone, Shah Rukh Khan, Abhishek Bachchan, Sonu Sood, Boman Irani, Vivaan Shah and Jackie Shroff. The film was planned in 2005 but was shelved for unknown reasons and Farah Khan went on to make Om Shanti Om (2007) and Tees Maar Khan (2010). The film was distributed worldwide by Yash Raj Films. In the film, Charlie assembles a team of non-dancers to take part in a dance competition at a hotel in Dubai in a quest to pull off a diamond heist.

Made on a total budget of ₹140 crore (US$22.94 million), the film marked the third collaboration of the actor, producer and director; they previously worked on Main Hoon Na (2004) and Om Shanti Om (2007), the latter of which also featured Deepika Padukone as the female lead in her debut.

Happy New Year was released on Diwali 2014 in Dubai and India, with dubbed versions in Tamil, Telugu and Malayalam languages. The film gained around 4,200 screens in Hindi and 800 screens in Tamil, Telugu and Malayalam and released on Christmas 2015 in France and United Kingdom, with dubbed version in French, English, Arabic and Urdu languages, that was the biggest film release in India. It received mixed reviews from critics with praise for its acting, soundtrack, humor, cinematography, production design and VFX, but criticized its writing, length and pace. It grossed ₹44.97 crore (US$7.37 million) in India on its opening day which was the record for the highest domestic opening for an Indian film at that time and eventually grossing a total of ₹342 crore (US$56.04 million) worldwide.

At the 60th Filmfare Awards, Happy New Year received 2 nominations – Best Supporting Actor (Bachchan) and Best Female Playback Singer (Shreya Ghoshal for "Manwa Laage"). The Academy of Motion Picture Arts and Sciences features the film's script in their library.

== Plot ==
Chandramohan "Charlie" Manohar Sharma is a smalltime street boxer who has spent eight years plotting revenge on business tycoon Charan Grover, who was responsible for Charlie's father Manohar being falsely convicted and imprisoned as a thief. Charlie learns that some diamonds owned by Grover will be moved on Christmas Eve to the most secure safe in the world, Shalimar in Dubai. He finds out that Shalimar is located beneath the Atlantis Hotel, which is hosting the World Dance Championship. The night the diamonds come, Charlie plans to steal the diamonds and frame Grover.

He assembles a team that includes hard-of-hearing strongman and explosives expert Jagmohan "Jag" Prakash, seizure-prone safecracker Tehamton "Tammy" Irani, Jag's nephew and master hacker Rohan Singh, and Nandu Bhide, who looks identical to Grover's son Vicky. Jag and Tammy also resent Grover, as they both were close to and worked with Manohar to build Shalimar, while Nandu agrees to join the heist because he needs money to pay for his mother's surgery. Charlie reveals to Nandu that eight years ago, Grover, who at the time was an African diamonds dealer, had hired Manohar to build the most secure safe in the world to store some diamonds. As the project had been completed, Grover drugged Manohar and stole his own diamonds for the insurance money. He framed Manohar for the theft, sending him to prison for 12 years.

Nandu eventually enlists the help of Mohini, a bar dancer who aspires to open her own classical dance school, in order to teach them and represent Team India in the contest, and she develops feelings for Charlie. Thanks to Rohan's rigging and the men blackmailing the judges with evidence of their homosexuality, the team qualifies and travels to Dubai, where they are initially the subjects of controversy and ridicule. After a party for all the participants in the World Dance Championship, the gang excluding Mohini goes over the plan to rob the diamonds after the semis and camouflage them in Charile's drink for the flight home. During a rehearsal, Charlie sees Team Korea's leader bully the youngest member and sticks up for him, which results in a brawl between the two leaders. Charlie almost falls off the building but manages to get himself up, and Team Korea's leader almost falls but Charlie saves him.

For the semis, Team India and Team Korea are paired against each other by Grover, in which Team India manages to impress the audience with their unorthodox moves. The youngest member on Team Korea loses his balance while doing an act, but Charlie runs to rescue him from falling, earning the other teams's respect. After the dance, the plan commences where Jag and Nandu go to the lift to trap Vicky, only to learn that the diamonds will be coming on New Year's Eve instead of Christmas. The gang is demoralized at losing the chance to get revenge on Grover since they will most likely get eliminated. However, as the judges announce the teams that are advancing, they decide to add Team India as a wild card entry due to Charlie's selfless act from earlier. They make it to the finals and end up becoming the favorites to win, but Charlie inadvertently reveals the heist to Mohini. Charlie explains his reasons, also revealing that his father had in fact committed suicide in prison after finding a blade after Grover bribed Manohar's attorneys to sabotage his parole hearing, which he had hidden from Jag and Tammy. Mohini joins the plan, and the group successfully steals the diamonds on the night of the finals.

As the group prepares to flee by boat, Mohini refuses to join them, planning instead to dance in the finals for India. The group fights about whether to join her. When the diamonds are found missing and Team India fails to appear onstage, Grover accuses them of being the thieves; however, the entire group eventually joins Mohini in their final performance, convincing Grover's associates and the police that he stole his own diamonds, which were contracted to be sold after WDC. Team India wins the Championship. As they encounter Grover and Vicky being led away in handcuffs, Charlie reveals himself to Grover as Manohar's son and gives him the same razor blade Manohar used to commit suicide. The diamonds are unknowingly taken away at the customs but Charlie reveals to his team that he had secretly hidden them in the winning trophy.

The story ends with the entire team becoming successful and Charlie proposing to Mohini with a ring made from one of the diamonds at the grand opening of her dance school. During the credits, a "Worst Dance Competition" is hosted.

== Cast ==
- Shah Rukh Khan as Chandramohan "Charlie" Manohar Sharma
- Deepika Padukone as Mohini Joshi, the founder of Mohini Dance School
- Jackie Shroff as Charan Grover, Vicky's father and owner of Shalimar Securities who cheated Manohar and owns his company.
- Abhishek Bachchan in a dual role as
  - Nandan "Nandu" Bhide, Mohini's childhood friend.
  - Vicky Grover, Charan's son.
- Sonu Sood as Captain Jagmohan "Jag" Prakash, Manohar and Charlie's close friend.
- Boman Irani as Temthon "Tammy" Irani, Manohar and Charlie's close friend.
- Vivaan Shah as Rohan Singh, Jag's nephew, Charlie's close friend and hacker.
- Jakkrit Kanokpodjananon as Huyi Chuk, a Team Korea leader
- Mohan Kapur as Mr. Kapoor, Charan's assistant
- Varun Pruthi as Sartaj Gill, Charan's assistant
- Kavi Shastri as Mr. Suryakant Gupta
- Rio Kapadia as an unnamed owner of diamonds
- Sarah-Jane Dias as Laila, India's ambassador at WDC
- Daisy Irani as Namita Irani, Tammy's mother
- Anu Menon as Lola Kutty, a TV channel reporter representing India at WDC
- Anupam Kher as Manohar Sharma, Charlie's father and an honest businessman

=== Cameo appearances ===
- Kiku Sharda as a fake Saroj Khan for song "Taal Se Taal Mila"
- Prabhu Deva as himself, a dance instructor
- Malaika Arora as Manolika Jhawar, a heroine of a film titled Ha Haa He Hee
- Dino Morea as himself, host of World Dance Championship
- Vishal Malhotra as himself, a host of World Dance Championship auditions
- Anurag Kashyap as himself, a selection Judge of World Dance Championship auditions
- Vishal Dadlani as himself, a selection Judge of World Dance Championship auditions
- Sajid Khan as himself, a director of a film titled Ha Haa He Hee
- Geeta Kapur as herself, a judge of World Dance Championship.
- Abram Khan as himself, during the end credits
- Gauri Khan as herself, during the end credits
- Farah Khan as herself, as a judge of the 'Worst Dance Championship' during the end credits
- Farah Khan's children as themselves, during the end credits.

== Production ==
=== Development ===
In 2005, Farah Khan originally planned Happy New Year as her second film after Main Hoon Na (2004). The film was planned with an ensemble cast consisting of Amitabh Bachchan, Shah Rukh Khan, Akshay Kumar, Juhi Chawla, Manisha Koirala, Ameesha Patel, Priyanka Chopra, Raveena Tandon, and Zayed Khan. In 2006, Farah Khan signed then-model Deepika Padukone for the film. However, for unknown reasons, the film was shelved, and Farah went on to direct Om Shanti Om (2007), which starred Shah Rukh Khan and Padukone. Farah Khan eventually decided to revive the project in 2012, with screenwriting completed by October that year.

=== Casting ===
Upon the film's revival in 2012, Priyanka Chopra was initially cast alongside Khan as the female lead, but opted out due to scheduling conflicts. Several other actresses including Sonakshi Sinha, Aishwarya Rai Bachchan, Parineeti Chopra and Katrina Kaif were considered; however Padukone was finalized, marking her third film opposite Khan after Om Shanti Om and Chennai Express. John Abraham and Prithviraj Sukumaran were also approached for the film; however they both declined and Sonu Sood was cast. Boman Irani's involvement in the film was confirmed by Farah in an interview. In August 2013, Jackie Shroff was cast as the antagonist. Farah's brother, Sajid Khan and actress Malaika Arora were confirmed to make guest appearances. Prabhu Deva appears as himself in a cameo appearance.

=== Filming ===
Farah Khan announced that filming would begin in September 2013. The first schedule began in Dubai in November 2013. The film was shot extensively at the Atlantis, The Palm in Palm Jumeirah, Dubai.

In January 2014, Shah Rukh Khan injured himself while shooting at the JW Marriott Hotel in Mumbai. Though reported as minor at first, he suffered a fractured shoulder and a torn left knee patella, being advised to rest for a while.

Mehboob Studios was used as one of the major filming locations while certain portions were also filmed near the Wilson College. The final schedule was completed in September 2014.

== Marketing ==
For promotion, digitally personalized posters written in cast members' handwriting were made available to social media users. The team of Shahrukh Khan, Deepika Padukone, Boman Irani, Sonu Sood and Vivaan Shah went to the set of the famous Indian television show Tarak Mehta Ka Ooltah Chashma (TMKOC) for the promotion of their movie.

The film's cast and crew, along with rapper Yo Yo Honey Singh and actress Madhuri Dixit travelled on a promotional tour titled "SLAM!". Starting from 19 September in Houston, it took place in New Jersey, Washington, Toronto, Chicago, Vancouver and San Jose. "SLAM!" also continued to United Kingdom on 5 October.

On 13 October 2014, an official game based on the film, titled Happy New Year-The Game was released for Android and iOS. It was made in collaboration with the production company and Gameshastra India, an Indian game art outsourcing studio.

=== Distribution ===
The worldwide distribution rights were sold to Yash Raj Films for ₹1.25 billion (US$20.48 million), the satellite rights were sold to Zee Network for ₹650 million (US$10.65 million) and the music rights to T-Series for ₹120 million (US$1.97 million), earning a total pre-release revenue of ₹2.02 billion (US$33.1 million).

== Music ==
The music of Happy New Year is composed by the duo of Vishal–Shekhar while the lyrics are penned by Irshad Kamil; John Stewart Eduri composed the background score. The full soundtrack was launched on 15 September 2014 at a highly advertised event held in Film City, Mumbai, which was also streamed live on the production company's official YouTube channel. Prior to that, promotional music videos were released for "Indiawaale" on 3 September and "Manwa Laage" on 10 September respectively. After the album was launched, promotional videos of the songs "Lovely", "Nonsense Ki Night" and "Satakli" were also released. "India Waale" is featured in Just Dance Now, Just Dance 2015 (as downloadable content) and is part of the Just Dance Unlimited service.

== Reception ==
=== Box office ===
Worldwide, the film grossed ₹394 crore (US$64.56 million), making it one of the highest-grossing Indian films of all time.

==== India ====
Happy New Year set a record by collecting ₹44.99 crore, making it the first Bollywood film to reach the figure in a single day. The record was broken by the 2018 Diwali release Thugs of Hindostan starring Aamir Khan, Amitabh Bachchan, Katrina Kaif and Fatima Sana Shaikh which collected 52.25 crore on Day 1. The film witnessed a drop on Saturday when it earned ₹ 285 million nett and collections on Sunday were in the same range, taking the opening weekend to a record ₹ 970 million nett. The film grossed around ₹ 1.75 billion in its first weekend worldwide, the second highest opening for a Hindi film after Dhoom 3.

The film grossed around ₹ 122.5 million nett on its first Monday to take its total to ₹ 1.09 billion in four days. It earned ₹ 110 million nett on its first Tuesday as the film had a decent hold from Monday in a few circuits, taking its total to a huge ₹ 1.20 billion nett in five days. Happy New Year grossed a huge ₹ 1.34 billion nett in its first week. The film had a strong weekend and its all India collections were good on Monday and Tuesday but it fell on Wednesday. The huge first week gave the film a massive distributor share of ₹ 770 million approx. The film grossed ₹ 2.45 billion worldwide in its first week which was the fourth highest total ever behind Dhoom 3, Kick and Chennai Express. The Tamil and Telugu versions of the film grossed ₹ 11 million nett and ₹ 26 million nett respectively in first week.

Happy New Year had good collections on second Friday of around ₹ 45 million nett. The film showed huge growth on its second Saturday and Sunday to gross around ₹ 67.5 million nett and ₹ 92.5 million nett respectively. Happy New Year grossed around ₹ 202.5 million in second weekend to take its ten-day total to ₹ 1.54 billion nett. The film grossed around ₹ 30 million nett on second Monday, ₹ 40 million nett on second Tuesday and ₹ 27.5 million nett on second Wednesday. Happy New Year grossed around ₹ 353.8 million nett in its second week to take its total to ₹ 1.685 billion nett. It grossed around ₹ 45 million nett over its third weekend to take its total to ₹ 1.73 billion nett. Happy New Year grossed around ₹ 77.5 million nett in week three taking its total to a little over ₹ 1.76 billion nett.

Happy New Year grossed ₹ 15.6 million nett in week four and ₹ 3.4 million nett in week five taking its final total to ₹ 1.83 billion nett. Box Office India declared Happy New Year a "Super Hit". Its final domestic gross was ₹ 240 crore (US$48 million).

==== Overseas ====
Happy New Year recorded the second highest overseas opening weekend of all time with figures of US$8.1 million (₹ 498 million). The film had an all-time record opening in the Gulf, Nepal, Sri Lanka, South Africa, Malaysia, Thailand, Hong Kong and Germany. In the opening weekend, the film grossed US$2.9 million (₹ 178 million) in the Gulf, $2 million (₹ 123 million) in US/Canada, £570,000 (₹ 56 million) in United Kingdom, A$380,000 (₹ 20.5 million) in Australia, and PKR 62 million (US$600,000, INR 37 million) in Pakistan. Happy New Year took the all-time best ever opening for a Hindi film in Germany as it grossed $94,000 on its first day of release. Dhoom 3 had grossed $86,000 over the weekend and My Name Is Khan was $98,000 over the weekend.

At the end of its theatrical run overseas, the film earned US$16.71 million (₹ 102 crore) in overseas markets. It is one of the highest-grossing Indian films ever in overseas markets.

The film released in China on 12 February 2015. It went on to gross $500,000 (₹3.21 crore) at the Chinese box office.

=== Critical reception ===
The film received mixed reviews from critics in India and overseas. It holds a 57% rating on Rotten Tomatoes, based on 14 reviews. While the performances of the lead cast and the humor received praise, the lack of character development and the 'unoriginal' plot received criticism.

==== Domestic ====
Rajeev Masand of CNN-IBN gave 2.5 stars out of 5, commenting "You'll find yourself chuckling and cringing alternately while watching Happy New Year, in which director Farah Khan skillfully sets up a heist plot against an international dance competition scenario. Its a curious premise, and Farah brings many of the same elements that she applied to good use in Main Hoon Na and Om Shanti Om, namely lots of self-referencing, affectionate nods to 70s Bollywood, and the ability to occasionally laugh at oneself." Anupama Chopra gave 2 out of 5 stars and said "It is frantic, noisy, gaudy and, largely, joyless. Farah takes the framework of the traditional heist movie and bungs in revenge, melodrama, comedy, romance, countless dazzling dance sequences and, as a climactic flourish, a dose of patriotism."

Saurabh Gupta of Indian Express rated the film 2 out of 5 stars calling it a "Mera Bharat Mahan sentiments" type movie, and a cross between an Ocean's 11/12 and "Flashdance". Rediff rated the film 2 out of 5 stars, and said "the film plays out like a spoof from the get go, a gigantic lark where nothing is taken seriously". NDTV also rated the film 2 out of 5 stars and said that irrespective of earnings at the box office, it "has nothing new to offer". Mihir Fadnavis of First Post said that, "the movie looks and feels like a home video project that was intended for appreciation by precisely two people in the entire universe – Farah and Shah Rukh Khan" and appears to be "Ocean's 11 rewritten by baboons". Rohit Vats of Hindustan Times gave the film 2.5 out of 5 stars taking on originality, said that "Originality? What's that, ask Farah Khan in Happy New Year".

==== International ====
Shilpa Jamkhandikar of Reuters said that the film has liberally borrowed from Hollywood heist films, in particular from Steven Soderbergh's Ocean's Eleven. "The first half is lighter and genuinely funny at times, but as the second half wears on, the proceedings become monotonous". Lisa Tsering of The Hollywood Reporter reviewed film as, "an ambitious musical, a love story and an Ocean's 11-style crime caper". Sami Qahar of the Dawn gave the film 2.5 out 5 stars and said the film is "Ocean's Eleven plus Italian Job plus Step Up all in one...on cheap shape-deteriorating steroids."

== Awards and nominations ==
Award	Category	Recipients and nominees	Results
7th Mirchi Music Awards	Song of The Year	"Manwa Laage"	Nominated
7th Mirchi Music Awards	Male Vocalist of The Year	Arijit Singh – "Manwa Laage"	Nominated
7th Mirchi Music Awards	Female Vocalist of The Year	Shreya Ghoshal – "Manwa Laage"	Nominated
7th Mirchi Music Awards	Music Composer of The Year	Vishal–Shekhar – "Manwa Laage"	Nominated
7th Mirchi Music Awards	Lyricist of The Year	Irshad Kamil – "Manwa Laage"	Won
7th Mirchi Music Awards	Best Song Producer (Programming & Arranging)	Jackie V – "Manwa Laage"	Nominated
7th Mirchi Music Awards	Best Song Engineer (Recording & Mixing)	Satchith Harve & Praveen Muralidhar – "Manwa Laage"	Won
Producers Guild Film Awards	Best Actor in a Supporting Role	Abhishek Bachchan	Won
Producers Guild Film Awards	Hall of Fame	Happy New Year	Won
Producers Guild Film Awards	Best Actor in a Leading Role	Shahrukh Khan	Nominated
Producers Guild Film Awards	Best Actress in a Leading Role	Deepika Padukone (also for Finding Fanny)	Nominated
Producers Guild Film Awards	Best Female Playback Singer	Shreya Ghoshal for "Manwa Laage"	Nominated
Producers Guild Film Awards	Best Choreography	Geeta Kapoor and Farah Khan for "Lovely"	Nominated
Producers Guild Film Awards	Best Special Effects	Keitan Yadav, Haresh Hingorani and Red Chillies VFX	Nominated
International Indian Film Academy Awards	Best Actor	Shahrukh Khan	Nominated
International Indian Film Academy Awards	Best Actress	Deepika Padukone	Nominated
BIG Star Entertainment Awards	Most Entertaining Actor in a Comic Role	Abhishek Bachchan	Won
Bollywood Hungama Surfers' Choice Movie Awards	Best Performance in a Comic Role	Abhishek Bachchan	Won
Bollywood Hungama Surfers' Choice Movie Awards	Best Actor	Shahrukh Khan	Nominated
Bollywood Hungama Surfers' Choice Movie Awards	Best Actress	Deepika Padukone	Nominated
Bollywood Hungama Surfers' Choice Movie Awards	Best Marketed Film	Happy New Year	Nominated
Bollywood Hungama Surfers' Choice Movie Awards	Best Special Effects	Red Chillies VFX	Nominated
Bollywood Hungama Surfers' Choice Movie Awards	Best Soundtrack	Vishal–Shekhar	Nominated
Bollywood Hungama Surfers' Choice Movie Awards	Best Female Playback Singer	Kanika Kapoor for "Lovely"	Nominated
Bollywood Hungama Surfers' Choice Movie Awards	Best Song	"Manwa Laage"	Nominated
Bollywood Hungama Surfers' Choice Movie Awards	Best Music Video	"Sharabi"	Nominated
Bollywood Hungama Surfers' Choice Movie Awards	Best Choreography	Geeta Kapoor, Farah Khan	Nominated
Filmfare Awards	Best Supporting Actor	Abhishek Bachchan	Nominated
Filmfare Awards	Best Female Playback Singer	Shreya Ghoshal for "Manwa Laage"	Nominated
Stardust Awards	Best Female Playback Singer	Kanika Kapoor for "Lovely" (Happy New Year) and "Baby Doll" (Ragini MMS 2)	Won
Stardust Awards	Best Film of the Year	Gauri Khan and Red Chillies Entertainment	Won
Stardust Awards	Dream Director	Farah Khan	Won
Stardust Awards	Star of the Year – Male	Shahrukh Khan	Won
Stardust Awards	Star of the Year – Female	Deepika Padukone (also for Finding Fanny)	Won
Stardust Awards	Best Actor in a Thriller or Action	Shahrukh Khan	Won
Stardust Awards	Best Music Director	Vishal–Shekhar	Nominated
Stardust Awards	Best Breakthrough Performance – Male	Vivaan Shah	Nominated
Stardust Awards	Best Actress in a Thriller or Action	Deepika Padukone	Nominated
Stardust Awards	Best Supporting Actor	Abhishek Bachchan, Sonu Sood and Boman Irani	Nominated

== Controversies ==
=== Spoof on Saroj Khan ===
Film choreographer Saroj Khan reportedly got upset after being parodied in the film. The spoof character was played by Kiku Sharda. Farah Khan denied having spoofed Saroj Khan. Farah had earlier allegedly spoofed Manoj Kumar in her 2007 film Om Shanti Om.

=== Controversial statement by Jaya Bachchan ===
Jaya Bachchan described Happy New Year as a "nonsensical film" and she said, "I only watched it because Abhishek is in it. I told him that he is a great actor if he can act stupid in front of the camera like that."
