= Siya (name) =

Siya is a short form of Siyamthanda, Siyabonga, Siyabulela. People with the name include:

- Siya (born 1987), American hip hop musical artist
- Siya Kolisi (born 1991), South African rugby union player
- Siya Malasi, Indian actress and model
- Siya Masuku (born 1996), South African rugby union player
- Siya Mdaka (born 1988), South African rugby union player
- Siya Mngoma (born 1988), South African footballer
- Siya Simetu (born 1991), South African cricketer

== See also ==
- Anthony of Siya (1479–1556), Russian Orthodox monk
