= Rangabali (film) =

- Theatrical release poster
- Directed by: Pawan Basamsetti
- Written by: Pawan Basamsetti
- Produced by: Sudhakar Cherukuri, Ramana Rao Rudrapati
- Starring: Naga Shaurya; Yukti Thareja; Brahmaji; Murali Sharma
- Cinematography: Vamsi Patchipulusu; Divakar Mani
- Edited by: Karthika Srinivas
- Music by: Pawan CH
- Production company: SLV Cinemas
- Distributed by: SLV Cinemas
- Release date: 7 July 2023
- Running time: 134 minutes
- Country: India
- Language: Telugu
- Box office: ₹8 crore

Rangabali is a 2023 Indian Telugu-language romantic action comedy film written and directed by Pawan Basamsetti and produced by Ramana Rao Rudrapati, under SLV Cinemas. It stars Naga Shaurya and Yukti Thareja in the lead roles, with Shine Tom Chacko, Brahmaji, Satya, Murali Sharma, Goparaju Ramana and others in supporting roles. The music and background score of the film was composed by Pawan CH.

== Cast ==
- Naga Shaurya as Shaurya "Show"
- Yukti Thareja as Dr. Sahaja Reddy
- Goparaju Ramana as Vishwam, Shaurya’s father
- Kalyani Natarajan as Shaurya’s mother
- Satya as Agadham, Shaurya’s friend
- Shine Tom Chacko as MLA Parasuram
- Murali Sharma as Mr. Reddy, Sahaja’s father
- Rajkumar Kasireddy as Raju, Shaurya's friend
- Brahmaji as Pukaar
- Sapthagiri as Express Journalist
- Bhadram as RMP Doctor
- Sivannarayana Naripeddi as College Dean
- Subhalekha Sudhakar as Soda shop Shivayya
- Noel Sean as College Senior
- Kodati Pawan Kalyan as Atul
- S. S. Kanchi
- Anantha Sriram as Parasuram’s secretary
- R. Sarathkumar in a special appearance as Ranga Reddy, Sahaja’s late grandfather
- Jani Master in a special appearance in song "Mana Oorilo Evadra Apedhi"
- Nia Sharma in a special appearance in song "Raya Raya Ro"

== Soundtrack ==
The music was composed by Pawan CH.

Track listing
No.	Title	Lyrics	Singer(s)	Length
1.	"Mana Orilo Evadra Apedhi"	Pawan Basamsetti, Sri Harsha Emani	Anurag Kulkarni	3:57
2.	"Kala Kantu Unte"	Krishna Kanth	Sarthak Kalyani, Vaish	4:38
3.	"Padha Padha Prema"	Ananta Sriram	Hiral Viradia, Aravind Srinivas	1:24
4.	"Raya Raya Ro"	Ananta Sriram	Jonita Gandhi, Hiral Viradia	3:32
Total length:				13:31

== Reception ==
A critic from The Times of India wrote that "At the end of it all, it feels like a crime that Rangabali had the potential to be better, but it just isn't. It just lacks the 'show' manship required of it". A critic from The Hindu wrote that "Naga Shaurya and Satya bring in occasional laughs as 'Rangabali' tries hard, in vain, to doff its hat to mass Telugu cinema".
