= Sua sponte =

Action taken in law without request from another party

In law, sua sponte (Latin: "of his, her, its, or their own accord") or suo motu/suo moto ("on its own motion") describes an act of authority taken without formal prompting by another party. The term is usually applied to actions taken by a judge without a prior motion or request from the parties. The form nostra sponte ("of our own accord") is sometimes used when the action is taken by a multi-member court, such as an appellate court, rather than by a single judge. (Third parties describing such actions would still refer to them as being taken by the court as a whole and therefore as sua sponte.) While usually applied to actions of a court, the term may reasonably be applied to actions by government agencies and individuals acting in their official capacities.

One situation in which a party might encourage a judge to move sua sponte occurs when that party is preserving a special appearance (usually to challenge jurisdiction) and therefore cannot make motions on its behalf without making a general appearance. Judges commonly act sua sponte when they determine that the court does not have subject-matter jurisdiction or that the case should be moved to another judge because of a conflict of interest, even if all parties disagree.

== Notable cases ==
- In Carlisle v. United States, 517 U.S. 416 (1996), the Supreme Court of the United States ruled that a district court could not move sua sponte to grant a judgment of acquittal (notwithstanding the verdict) to remedy the late filing of the equivalent motion.
- In Trest v. Cain, 522 U.S. 87 (1997), 94 F.3d 1005, the United States Court of Appeals for the Fifth Circuit moved sua sponte to reject a habeas corpus claim because of procedural default, citing an obligation to do so. The Supreme Court ruled that this was not obligatory but declined to rule whether it was permitted.
- Since 2009, the Supreme Court of Pakistan has frequently taken up suo motu cases against government authorities involving violence, corruption, imposition of price ceilings on various commodities, and so on. The extent to which the court should exercise this authority is a matter of political debate.

== Other uses ==
- The United States Army Rangers' 75th Ranger Regiment's motto is Sua Sponte, referring to the Rangers' ability to accomplish tasks with little to no prompting and to recognize that a Ranger volunteers three times: for the U.S. Army, Airborne School, and service in the 75th Ranger Regiment.

== See also ==
- Motu proprio
