= MTV Supermodel of the Year =

- Genre: Reality television; Competition
- Presented by: Malaika Arora
- Judges: Malaika Arora; Milind Soman; Anusha Dandekar
- Country of origin: India
- Original languages: Hindi; English
- No. of seasons: 2
- No. of episodes: 24

Production
- Running time: 45-50 minutes
- Production company: Face Entertainment

Original release
- Network: MTV India
- Release: 22 December 2019 – 24 October 2021

MTV Supermodel of the Year is an Indian reality television series that premiered on 22 December 2019 and was broadcast on MTV India. The viewers will see several women compete for the title of Supermodel of the Year, providing them with an opportunity to begin their career in the modelling industry.

== Judges and mentors ==
Judge/Mentor	Season	
Judge/Mentor	1	2
Judging Panellists
Malaika Arora	Main	Main
Masaba Gupta	Main	Guest
Milind Soman	Main	Main
Anusha Dandekar	Mentor	Main
Ujjwala Raut	Mentor	
Nitya Pant	Guest	Guest
Daniel C Bauer	Guest	Guest

== Season summary ==
Season	Premiere date	Finale date	Winner	Runner-ups	Other contestants in order of elimination	Number of contestants	Winner's Prizes
1	22 December 2019	15 March 2020	Manila Pradhan	Priya Singh	Anvita Dixit & Sakshi Shivdasani & Anushka Sharma, Anjali Schmuck, Renee Kujur, Eashita Bajwa, Yukti Thareja, Drisha More	10	Supermodel Trophy; Livon girl for a year and feature in campaigns; The face on 100 million Livon Serum Packs; Walk for a designer at Lakme Fashion Week Winter Festive 2020; Cash prize of 5 lakh rupees; Face of the Infinity campaign
2	22 August 2021	24 October 2021	Roshni Dada	Eksha Hangma Subba	Joanne Fernandez & Kashish Ratnani & Monisha Sen & Palak Singhal & Pearl Seth, Siya Malasi, Anaika Nair, Nishi Bhardwaj, Jayshree Roy & Muna Gauchan, Diksha Thapa, Thomsina D'Mello, Swapna Priyadarshini	15	Supermodel Trophy; Cash prize of 5 lakh rupees; The face of Livon Brand Campaign

== Season 1 ==
=== Contestants ===
(Ages stated are at start of contest)

Name	Age	Height	Hometown	Finish	Place
Anvita Dixit	23	1.73 m (5 ft 8 in)	Mumbai	Episode 9	10
Sakshi Shivdasani	22	1.73 m (5 ft 8 in)	Mumbai	Episode 9	9
Anushka Sharma	23	1.70 m (5 ft 7 in)	Singapore	Episode 9	8
Anjali Schmuck	24	1.73 m (5 ft 8 in)	Bengaluru	Episode 10	7
Renu Kujur	34	1.70 m (5 ft 7 in)	Chhattisgarh	Episode 11	6
Hiiya Bajwa (Eashita Bajwa)	21	1.73 m (5 ft 8 in)	Punjab	Episode 12	5
Yukti Thareja	19	1.68 m (5 ft 6 in)	Karnal	Episode 13	4
Drisha More	26	1.70 m (5 ft 7 in)	Chalisgaon	Episode 14	3
Priya Singh	24	1.70 m (5 ft 7 in)	Bulandshahr	Episode 14	2
Manila Pradhan	24	1.68 m (5 ft 6 in)	Namchi	Episode 14	1

=== Episodes ===
No. overall	No. in season	Title	Original release date
1	1	"Hunt for the next supermodel begins!"	22 December 2019
The judges of the show, Malaika Arora, Milind Soman and Masaba Gupta had a hefty task to select ten unique faces for the show from a medley of twelve thousand entries. The models were introduced through their first runway show. The girls then had a personal interview with the panel.: Featured Guest: EPR (Runner-up of MTV Hustle)
2	2	"Audition for the Top ten continues!"	29 December 2019
The personal interview of the remaining girls continues. The models will be switching between the Boot Camp - which include Tasks, Activities, Training & lots more and Battle - Challenges in the real world. The models moved into the Supermodel House.
3	3	"Models up in the sky and hanging!"	5 January 2020
The Models performed in the first audition task - A print ad, Client - Zipline Internet Services, Campaign brief - "Your Office in the Sky", Campaign line - "Consistence Speed Wherever You Are" where the models had to pose sitting on an office chair which was zip-lining from one building to another. This task determined the girls who will be shortlisted to take part in the next task. At deliberation, the judges critiqued the models based on their photos.: Featured Photographer: Gary Dean Taylor; Featured Guests: DJ Bravo and Rimi Nique
4	4	"Strike a pose!"	12 January 2020
The Shortlisted Models performed in the Short-list task - A print ad, Client - Indie Land Truck & Tyres, Campaign- Print Media, Campaign Brief - "Chale Aise Makhan Jaise" where the models had to pose on a moving truck. At deliberation, the judges critiqued and scored the models based on their photos. Eashita was the top performer and received a Livon Supermodel Badge. Malaika also revealed that there will no elimination for the first few weeks.: Featured Photographer: Adrian Evan
5	5	"Underwater ramp walk!"	19 January 2020
The models performed the next audition task - an underwater ramp walk, Client - Whatta Nymph, Product- Waterproof Cosmetics, Campaign brief - "Never Run Out" where the models had walk the ramp underwater. This task determined the girls who will be shortlisted to take part in the next Short-list task. Ujjwala revealed that the owner of Livon Supermodel Badge will get two Super-perks - either of add 5 points to her score or skip the Audition and directly perform Short-list Task. Eashita decided to add 5 points to her score. At deliberation, the judges critiqued the models based on their photos.
6	6	"A magazine cover photo shoot!"	26 January 2020
The Shortlisted Models performed in the Shortlist task - A magazine cover, Client - Supermodel Inc., Campaign- Print Media, Campaign Brief - "Supermodel Forever" where the contestants posed with the ultimate supermodels Milind Soman and Ujjwala Raut. At deliberation, the judges critiqued and scored the models based on their magazine covers. Drisha was the top performer and received a Livon Supermodel Badge.: Featured Fashion Designer: Deme Gabriella
7	7	"Taking it up a notch with Ujjwala!"	2 February 2020
The models performed the next audition task - an androgynous ramp walk, where the models had walk the ramp in menswear. The owner of Livon Supermodel Badge Drisha decided to add 5 points to her score.: Featured Fashion Designer: Kunal Tanna; Later the Shortlisted Models performed in the Shortlist task - Accidental Ramp Walk, where the models had walk the ramp in front of the judges.: 1. Priya - Losing one of the heels 2. Drisha - Headgear with real fruits 3. Yukti - Unexpected runway partner 4. Anjali - Blindfolded; 5. Eashita - Losing one of the heels 6. Manila - Headgear with real fruits 7. Reene - Unexpected runway partner; Featured Fashion Designer: Masaba Gupta; Featured Task Element Member: Deepen Sharma; At deliberation, the judges critiqued and scored the models based on their runway walk. Priya was the top performer and received a Livon Supermodel Badge.: Guest Judge: Kunal Kapoor
8	8	"Soaring high into the sky!"	8 February 2020
The models got to relax and spend some time playing fun games with the Livon girl Mithila Palkar. This was last Audition Task - "Leap of Faith", Client - Zesty Energy Drink Nymph, Brief - "Leaps & Bounds of Energy", where the models had jump between two shipping containers while completing a posing routine midair and delivering dialogues for a TV Scene. The current owner of Livon Supermodel Badge Priya decided to skip the Audition Task and directly perform the Short-list Task. After the Audition Task, at the model pad the models got messages from home and got to talk to their family through a phone call. Later the judges critiqued the models based on their photos and videos of the Audition Task, but didn't find anyone stand out. Therefore, decided all to be shortlisted. Later the models performed in the Shortlist task last task of the Boot-camp, Client - the panel & Brand - "The Real You", where the models had perform in a Black & White Digital Video & Photo-shoot telling a story about them or a story from their life.: Featured Guest: Mithila Palkar
9	9	"No make-up, B&W portrait challenge!"	9 February 2020
At the panel, Malaika revealed that there will be mass elimination where three models will be eliminated today. At deliberation, the judges critiqued and scored the models based on the models' Black & White Portrait Photo and Video. Drisha & Yukti were tied as the top scorer and both received a Livon Supermodel Badge and added 5 points to their cumulative scores. Based on the overall score of the Boot-Camp Phase - Anvita, Sakshi & Anushka were eliminated.
10	10	"Dancing in the streets"	16 February 2020
This was the first task in the real world with real brands, Client - "Infinity by Harman", Brief - Young Fresh TV Scene, Product - Headphones & Tagline - "Immerse yourself in your own with Infinity headphones and speakers where the music never stops" where the models had to dance in the streets of a busy market with a Harman Headphone. At deliberation, the judges critiqued and scored the models based on their performance in the Task. Renu emerged as the top scorer and received the Livon Supermodel Badge and also received Glide 500 headphones from the Client. The 2 least scorers were in the bottom 2, Priya and Anjali had to battle each other in the survival battle. They had to perform in a face submerged underwater photoshoot with ink in the water. Then the judges critiqued and scored the models based on their photographs where Priya survived and Anjali was eliminated.: Featured Client: Jasmeet Singh Sethi
11	11	"Drift in the air and say cheese!"	23 February 2020
In the second battle, the top six models had to pose in the air in pairs for Livon serum and make their hair the hero. Client - "Livon" & Tagline - "Salon nahi Livon". The pairs were: 1. Manila-Yukti : Livon Shake and Spray; 2. Renne-Drisha : Livon Color Protect; 3. Eashita-Priya : Livon Serum; At deliberation, the judges critiqued and scored the models based on their performance in the Task. Manila & Yukti impressed the judges with their performance and emerged as the top scorers and received Livon badges and also will be featured in the next Livon Campaign. Renne & Drisha were the least scorers and were in bottom 2 and ended up in the survival battle. Drisha survived and Renne got eliminated. Leaving the 5 models making it into Top 5.: Guest Judge: Daniel C Bauer
12	12	"Change the game with EPR!"	1 March 2020
In the third battle, the top 5 models got the opportunity to star in a music video for MTV India with EPR. At deliberation, the judges critiqued and scored the models based on their performance in the Task. Manila emerged as the top scorer and received the Livon Supermodel Badge. Priya & Eashita were the least scorers and were in bottom 2 and ended up in the survival battle where they had to pose for Infinity by harman speakers and headphones, tagline - "The Music Never Stops". The 3 other models Anjali, Yukti and Drisha, who can help them in a party set and in a yoga set. Priya survived and Eashita got eliminated.: Featured Guest: EPR (Runner-up of MTV Hustle)
13	13	"Surviving the tiger!"	8 March 2020
The top 4 models had to compete in the fourth battle to make it to the Top 3 & in the Final of Supermodel of the Year. The client was the title sponsor - Livon, Tagline - "Livon, your salon in a bottle", where the models were given a BIG Hair Dos by Daniel Bauer and his team. Then the models had to immediately rush to the Photo Corner for a still Photoshop, then to the live camera set-up where they had to give a scripted ad for Livon and then to the supermodel ramp for a full-on attitude runway walk in front of the panel. For the entire project their hair has to the Hero. At deliberation, the judges critiqued and scored the models based on their performance in the Task. Manila emerged as the top scorer for three weeks in a row and received the Livon Supermodel Badge and became the first Finalist. Yukti, Priya & Drisha were the least scorers and were in bottom 3 and ended up in the survival battle. With Inception X, an augmented and virtual reality based company as the clientele, the models have to showcase their initiative to save the tiger, with a tiger created in AR! This happened live in from the panel. Priya & Drisha survived and became Finalists, and Yukti got eliminated.: Guest Judge: Nitya Pant
14	14	"GRAND FINALE: And the supermodel of the year is..."	15 March 2020
For the final project, the top 3 models had to a two part task for the Client: MTV India. In part-1, they had to do a digital photoshoot for the MTV India handle, in which they had to recreate an imagination as the winner of the show with the trophy and the panel: Malaika Arora, Masaba Gupta and Milind Soman. In part-2, they had to walk the ramp showcasing the Finalists with Raja Kumari performance. At the final deliberation, the judges and mentors critiqued and scored the models based on their performance in the final task and their overall performance on the show. With a score of 23.5/25, Manila emerged as the Winner and became "Supermodel of the year". Priya was the runner-up with a score of 19/25 and Drisha came third with a score of 18/25.: Featured Guest: Raja Kumari

=== Audition Task Summary ===
Contestant	Episode 3	Episode 5	Episode 7	Episode 8
Anjali	Shortlisted	Shortlisted	Shortlisted	Shortlisted
Anushka	Rejected	Shortlisted	Rejected	Shortlisted
Anvita	Rejected	Rejected	Rejected	Shortlisted
Drisha	Shortlisted	Shortlisted	Shortlisted	Shortlisted
Eashita	Shortlisted	Rejected	Shortlisted	Shortlisted
Manila	Shortlisted	Rejected	Shortlisted	Shortlisted
Priya	Shortlisted	Shortlisted	Shortlisted	Used Livon Badge
Reene	Rejected	Rejected	Shortlisted	Shortlisted
Sakshi	Rejected	Shortlisted	Rejected	Shortlisted
Yukti	Shortlisted	Rejected	Shortlisted	Shortlisted

=== Super Score Board ===
Contestant	Boot-Camp Phase						Battle Phase								Finale	
Contestant	Episode 2	Episode 4	Episode 6	Episode 7	Episode 9	Total Score	Episode 10		Episode 11		Episode 12		Episode 13		Episode 14	
Manila	0	7.5	-	8	13	28.5	11.5		14.5		15		12		23.5	Winner
Priya	0	9.5	11	14	11	45.5	6	13	9.5		9.5	13	11	6.5	19	Runner-up
Drisha	0	6	12	11.5 +5 (Note: Drisha used her Livon Supermodel Badge to add 5 points to her score.)	15 +5 (Note: Drisha received Livon Supermodel Badge and 5 points were added to her score.)	54.5	8		6.5	6.5	10		11	9	18	2nd Runner-up
Yukti	0	9.5	-	10	15 +5 (Note: Yukti received Livon Supermodel Badge and 5 points were added to her score.)	39.5	9		14.5		12.5		9	6		Guest
Eashita	0	10	5 (Note: Eashita used her Livon Supermodel Badge to add 5 points to her score.)	9	12	39	10		9.5		9	10.5				Guest
Reene	0	-	-	11	12.5	23.5	13.5		6.5	6						Guest
Anjali	0	13	7.5	10.5	11.5	40	5	10								Guest
Anushka	0	-	10.5	-	8.5	19										Guest
Sakshi	0	-	4.5	-	8.5	13										Guest
Anvita	0	-	-	-	7.5	7.5										Guest

The contestant won.
The contestant was the runner-up.
The contestant was the 2nd runner-up.
The contestant returned as a guest for that episode.

Highest score of the week.
Lowest score of the week.
Survived the Survival Battle.
Lowest score and eliminated.

=== Episodes Super Scoring Chart ===
==== Boot-Camp Phase ====
===== Episode 4 =====
Place	Contestant	Milind's Score	Masaba's Score	Malaika's Score	Total Score
1	Anjali	3.5	3.5	3.5	10.5
2	Eashita	4	4.5	4.5	13
3	Priya	4	2	3.5	9.5
4	Yukti	2.5	4.5	2.5	9.5
5	Manila	2.5	2.5	2.5	7.5
6	Drisha	3	1.5	1.5	6
7-10	Anushka	-			0
7-10	Anvita	-			0
7-10	Reene	-			0
7-10	Sakshi	-			0

===== Episode 6 =====
Place	Contestant	Milind's Score	Masaba's Score	Malaika's Score	Total Score
1	Drisha	4	4	4.5	12.5
2	Priya	3.5	4	4	11.5
3	Anushka	3	4.5	3	10.5
4	Anjali	2.5	2.5	2.5	7.5
5	Sakshi	1	2	1.5	4.5
6-10	Anvita	-			0
6-10	Eashita	-			0
6-10	Manila	-			0
6-10	Reene	-			0
6-10	Yukti	-			0

===== Episode 7 =====
Place	Contestant	Kunal's Score	Masaba's Score	Malaika's Score	Total Score
1	Priya	4.5	5	4.5	14
2	Drisha	3.5	4	4	11.5
3	Reene	3.5	4	4.5	12
4	Anjali	3.5	3.5	3.5	10.5
5	Yukti	3.5	4	2.5	10
6	Eashita	3	3	3	9
7	Manila	3	2.5	2.5	8
8-10	Anushka	-			0
8-10	Anvita	-			0
8-10	Sakshi	-			0

===== Episode 9 =====
Place	Contestant	Milind's Score	Masaba's Score	Malaika's Score	Total Score
1	Yukti	5	5	5	15
2	Drisha	5	5	5	15
3	Manila	4	4.5	4.5	13
4	Reene	4	4	4.5	12.5
5	Eashita	4	4	4	12
6	Anjali	4	3.5	4	11.5
7	Priya	3	4	4	11
8	Anushka	3	2.5	3	8.5
9	Sakshi	2.5	3	3	8.5
10	Anvita	2.5	2.5	2.5	7.5

==== Battle Phase ====
===== Episode 10 =====
Place	Contestant	Milind's Score	Masaba's Score	Malaika's Score	Total Score
1	Reene	4.5	4.5	4.5	13.5
2	Manila	3.5	4	4	11.5
3	Eashita	2.5	4	3.5	10
4	Yukti	3.5	2.5	3	9
5	Drisha	3	2.5	2.5	8
6	Priya	2	2	2	6
7	Anjali	2	1.5	1.5	5
Survival Battle
1	Priya	4.5	4	4.5	13
2	Anjali	3.5	3	3.5	10

===== Episode 11 =====
Place	Contestant	Daniel's Score	Masaba's Score	Malaika's Score	Total Score
1	Manila-Yukti	5	4.5	5	14.5
2	Priya-Eashita	3.5	3	3	9.5
3	Renu-Drisha	2.5	2	2	6.5
Survival Battle
1	Drisha	2	2.5	2	6.5
2	Renu	2	2	2	6

===== Episode 12 =====
Place	Contestant	Milind's Score	Masaba's Score	Malaika's Score	Total Score
1	Manila	5	5	5	15
2	Yukti	4.5	4.5	3.5	12.5
3	Drisha	3.5	3	3.5	10
4	Priya	2.5	3	4	9.5
5	Eashita	3	3	3	9
Survival Battle
1	Priya	4	4.5	4.5	13
2	Eashita	3	3.5	4	10.5

===== Episode 13 =====
Place	Contestant	Nitya's Score	Masaba's Score	Malaika's Score	Total Score
1	Manila	4	4	4	12
2	Drisha	4	4.5	2.5	11
2	Priya	3	3.5	4.5	11
3	Yukti	3.5	3	2.5	9
Survival Battle
Place	Contestant	Milind's Score	Masaba's Score	Malaika's Score	Total Score
1	Drisha	2.5	3	3.5	9
2	Priya	2	1.5	3	6.5
3	Yukti	2	1.5	2.5	6

===== Episode 14 - GRAND FINALE =====
Place	Contestant	Milind's Score	Masaba's Score	Ujjwala's Score	Anusha's Score	Malaika's Score	Total Score
1	Manila	5	4.5	5	4.5	4.5	23.5
2	Priya	3	4	3.5	4.5	4	19
3	Drisha	3.5	3.5	4	3.5	3.5	18

== Season 2 ==
In March 2021, the auditions for Season 2 were open on Voot. On 3 August 2021, it was announced season 2 will premiere on 22 August 2021.

Season 2 premiered on 22 August 2021 on MTV India and streamed 24 hours before on Voot Select.

=== Contestants ===
Name	Age	Height	Hometown	Finish	Place
Joanne Fernandez	19	1.72 m (5 ft 7 1/2 in)	Mumbai	Episode 2	15-11
Kashish Ratnani	19	1.69 m (5 ft 6 1/2 in)	Mumbai	Episode 2	15-11
Monisha Sen	23	1.75 m (5 ft 9 in)	Kolkata	Episode 2	15-11
Palak Singhal	24	1.68 m (5 ft 6 in)	Gurgaon	Episode 2	15-11
Pearl Seth	25	1.73 m (5 ft 8 in)	Mumbai	Episode 2	15-11
Siya Malasi	24	1.70 m (5 ft 7 in)	Uttar Pradesh	Episode 3	10
Anaika Nair	24	1.68 m (5 ft 6 in)	Mumbai	Episode 4	9
Nishi Bhardwaj	26	1.69 m (5 ft 6 1/2 in)	Delhi	Episode 6	8
Jayshree Roy	21	1.70 m (5 ft 7 in)	Mumbai	Episode 7	7
Muna Gauchan	23	1.68 m (5 ft 6 in)	Kathmandu	Episode 7	6
Diksha Thapa	23	1.74 m (5 ft 8 1/2 in)	Dehradun	Episode 8	5
Thomsina D’Mello	20	1.73 m (5 ft 8 in)	Mumbai	Episode 9	4
Swapna Priyadarshini	19	1.75 m (5 ft 9 in)	Odisha	Episode 10	3
Eksha Hangma Subba	21	1.68 m (5 ft 6 in)	Sikkim	Episode 10	2
Roshni Dada	22	1.70 m (5 ft 7 in)	Arunachal Pradesh	Episode 10	1

=== Episodes ===
No. overall	No. in season	Title	Original release date
15	1	"A quest for India's next supermodel"	22 August 2021
"Fashion icons Milind Soman, Malaika Arora, and Anusha Dandekar gather once again to find India's next supermodel." The shows starts with a futuristic rampwalk with 15 unique faces of season 2 with the judges of the show being Malaika Arora, Milind Soman and Anusha Dandekar.: Featured Fashion Designer: Bloni Atelier; Then the models had a personal interview with the panel.
16	2	"Crushing on Milind?"	29 August 2021
"The judges are making the choice for the top 10 supermodels... but wonder what makes one contestant stand out the most? Her honest confession about crushing hard on Milind Soman!" The personal interview of the remaining girls continues. Then the girls were judged on a group photoshoot, where each girl had to choose an emotion to display in the photo in a no make-up unfiltered photo. The top 10 girls were shortlisted by the panel and 5 girls were eliminated.
17	3	"First photoshoot with Milind!"	5 September 2021
"While Milind Soman becomes the creative director for the photo shoot, he is both, stern and motivational, who tries to get the best out of the girls." The models performed in the first photoshoot i.e. a print ad for Vanesa Body Deo & Perfume. Message: "Vanesa is Confidence, Vanesa is Freedom, Vanesa is my Fragrance" Tagline: "Love Yourself, Love Vanesa" Here, the models had to pose in mid air above 15 feet.: Creative Director: Milind Soman; Featured Photographer: Nuno Oliviera; Later as a part of Runway Challenge, the Models had walk the ramp in front of the judges with Macaw bird as a part of their accessories. At deliberation, the judges critiqued and scored the models based on their photos from photoshoot & their ramp walk. Muna emerged as the top scorer and received the Livon Supermodel Badge. Nishi won the best photograph chosen by the Client and received a hamper from Vanesa. The lowest scorers Anaika, Roshni and Siya, the panel had to eliminate one model and Siya was eliminated.
18	4	"Malaika on the ramp!"	12 September 2021
"Hold your breath, because Malaika Arora is setting the ramp on fire! A fiery photoshoot for Flash News, with Anusha Dandekar's mentoring and the grungy sets!" This week, the models performed in the photoshoot. Tagline: "Burning News at Your Fingertips" Here, the models had to pose with a burning newspaper. Milind gave a demo photoshoot, where he posed with the burning newspaper.: Featured Photographer: Gary Taylor; Milind visited the Supermodel House to give tips to the models about exercises for core strength. Later at the Runway Challenge, Malika walked the ramp and opened the show, the models then walked the ramp in trios in front of the panel.: Featured Fashion Designer: Akhil Nagpal; At deliberation, the judges critiqued and scored the models based on their photos from photoshoot & the ramp walk. Muna and Roshni emerged as the top scorers and received the Livon Supermodel Badge. Muna was in top two weeks in a row. The lowest scorers were Anaika and Thomsina. The panel had to eliminate one model; Anaika was eliminated.
19	5	"A photoshoot with Milind!"	19 September 2021
Episode started with Malika and Milind having a fun Q&A session. It's time to play with your hair as the girls have their next photoshoot for Livon with some Hairogrophy! The models had to perform in the music video for Livon with some Hairogrophy. Models had to be Quirky, Young, Fun, Vivacious, and Free. Tagline: "Unapologetically You": Wardrobe Courtesy: Essé; The models got a rampwalk choreography lesson from Anusha and Milind before the runway challenge.
20	6	"A showcase of chemistry!"	26 September 2021
At the Runway Challenge, the models have a tough job on their hands as they are to be judged based on their ability to portray chemistry and are accompanied on the ramp by Milind Soman, dressed in ethnic wear.: Featured Fashion Designer: Vaishali S; At deliberation, the judges critiqued and scored the models based on their photos from photoshoot & the ramp walk. Nitya choose Thomsina to be the Face of Livon's Digital Campaign. Thomsina & Roshni emerged as the top scorers and received the Livon Supermodel Badge. The lowest scorer Nishi was eliminated.: Featured Guest Judge: Nitya Pant
21	7	"A television commercial shoot"	3 October 2021
The week started with a fun session at the Supermodel House. The models then performed in a TV commercial for a cult premium skincare brand Brand: "Olay Retinol" Tagline: "Glow up from within". This week's Runway Challenge was inspired by real-life situations, the models had to walk the ramp in two different outfits.: Featured Fashion Designers: MellowDrama & VIRSHETÉ; At deliberation, the judges critiqued and scored the models based on their TV commercials & their walk on the ramp. Eksha emerged as the top scorer and received the Livon Supermodel Badge. The lowest scorer Jayshree was eliminated, but as a part of double elimination second lowest scorers Thomsina, Muna and Swapna were in danger. The panel had to eliminate one model; Muna was also eliminated despite having won two Livon Supermodel Badges.
22	8	"Capturing the magical moments"	10 October 2021
Episode started with Malika visiting the Supermodel House and having a fun session with the Top 5 models. Also to promote NUDE (Nutritious. Undisguised. Delicious. Eats.) Bowls by Malika and gave the models few bowls. The models were bestowed with the task of shooting a print campaign billboard for the popular brand Magic Moments. Brief: To create a magic moment. Tagline: "Make every moment, a Magic moment" Here, the models had to give an aerial performance with an aerialist. After the photoshoot, the models had to choose their final photograph to present to the panel.: Featured Photographer: Victoria; At deliberation, the judges critiqued and scored the models based on their billboard photoshoot. Eksha emerged as the top scorer and received the Livon Supermodel Badge and the lowest scorer Diksha was eliminated.: Guest Judge: Daniel C Bauer
23	9	"Who will be in the top 3?"	17 October 2021
The models faced the Livon runway challenge in which they had to express themselves not just through their walk but with their hair too, which is also their final chance to be in the top 3. The models also had to pose at the head ramp on a turn table for the title sponsor Livon.: Featured Photographer: Tanvi; After the runway, the models got the opportunity to score Anusha and Milind based on their advice given during photoshoots and runways. Anusha received highest points and became Creative Director of the year. At deliberation, the judges critiqued and scored the models based on their walk on the ramp & their LIVE photoshoot photograph. Eksha and Swapna emerged as the top scorer and received the Livon Supermodel Badge and the lowest scorer Thomsina was eliminated.: Guest Judge: Daniel C Bauer; Eksha also won the best photo by the Livon and will be on many packs of Livon.
24	10	"Grand Finale is here!"	24 October 2021
The theme for this season's Grand Finale was "Unapologetically You". First the models had a branded shoot, where the models had to perform in a digital fashion film for MTV India, the theme was "The Modern Indian Bride".: Featured Fashion Designers: Papa Don't Preach by Shubhika; On the final runway, the models had to walk with a Drag Queen.: Featured Runway Drag Queens: Isabelle Freida Wood, Tropical Marca, Dollin Lilly; At the final deliberation, the judges critiqued based on their entire journey throughout the season. Models received 1 lakh rupees from Magic Moments Music Studio & the model chosen by Magic Moments Music Studio to feature in their campaign was Swapna. Masaba choose Roshni to be one of the face of her beauty brand. Swapna became the 2nd Runner-up, whereas Eksha became the 1st Runner-up and Roshni was crowned the Winner.: Guest Judge: Masaba Gupta

=== Super Score Board ===
Contestant	Episode 3	Episode 4	Episode 6	Episode 7	Episode 8	Episode 9	Episode 10	
Roshni	5	14	16	13	12	17	19	Winner
Eksha	11	13	11	15	14	20	18.5	Runner-up
Swapna	11	6	15	10	9	20	15	2nd Runner-up
Thomsina	7	5	16	10	10	15		
Diksha	9	11	10	12	6			
Muna	14	14	14	10				
Jayshree	6	11	13	9				
Nishi	13	7	9					
Anaika	5	5						
Siya	5							

The contestant won.
The contestant was the runner-up.
The contestant was the 2nd runner-up.

Highest score of the week.
Lowest score of the week.
Lowest score and eliminated.

=== Episodes Super Scoring Chart ===
==== Episode 3 ====
Place	Contestant	Anusha's Score	Milind's Score	Malaika's Score	Total Score
1	Muna	4	5	5	14
2	Nishi	5	4	4	13
3-4	Eksha	4	3	4	11
3-4	Swapna	4	3	4	11
5	Diksha	3	3	3	9
6	Thomsina	1	3	3	7
7	Jayshree	2	2	2	6
8-10	Anaika	1	1	3	5
8-10	Roshni	1	2	2	5
8-10	Siya	2	1	2	5

==== Episode 4 ====
Place	Contestant	Anusha's Score	Milind's Score	Malaika's Score	Total Score
1-2	Muna	4	5	5	14
1-2	Roshni	5	4	5	14
3	Eksha	5	4	4	13
4-5	Diksha	4	3	4	11
4-5	Jayshree	4	3	4	11
6	Nishi	2	3	2	7
7	Swapna	2	2	2	6
8-9	Anaika	1	2	2	5
8-9	Thomsina	1	2	2	5

==== Episode 6 ====
Place	Contestant	Anusha's Score	Milind's Score	Malaika's Score	Nitya's Score	Total Score
1-2	Thomsina	4	4	4	4	16
1-2	Roshni	4	4	4	4	16
3	Swapna	4	3	4	4	15
4	Muna	2	4	4	4	14
5	Jayshree	4	3	3	3	13
6	Eksha	3	3	2	3	11
7	Diksha	3	2	3	2	10
8	Nishi	3	2	2	2	9

==== Episode 7 ====
Place	Contestant	Anusha's Score	Milind's Score	Malaika's Score	Total Score
1	Eksha	5	5	5	15
2	Roshni	4	5	4	13
3	Diksha	4	4	4	12
4-6	Thomsina	3	3	4	10
4-6	Swapna	3	4	3	10
4-6	Muna	3	3	4	10
7	Jayshree	3	3	3	9

==== Episode 8 ====
Place	Contestant	Anusha's Score	Daniel's Score	Malaika's Score	Total Score
1	Eksha	5	5	4	14
2	Roshni	4	4	4	12
3	Thomsina	4	3	3	10
4	Swapna	3	3	3	9
5	Diksha	2	2	2	6

==== Episode 9 ====
===== Creative Director Of The Year =====
The Top 4 models got the opportunity to score Anusha and Milind based on their advice given during photoshoots and runways.

Creative Director	Thomsina's Score	Roshni's Score	Eksha's Score	Swapna's Score	Total Score	Result
Anusha	5	5	5	5	20	WIN
Milind	4	4	5	4	17	LOSE

===== Top 4 Score Table =====
Place	Contestant	Anusha's Score	Milind's Score	Daniel's Score	Malaika's Score	Total Score
1-2	Swapna	5	5	5	5	20
1-2	Eksha	5	5	5	5	20
3	Roshni	4	4	4	5	17
4	Thomsina	3	4	4	4	15

==== Episode 10 - GRAND FINALE ====
Place	Contestant	Anusha's Score	Milind's Score	Masaba's Score	Malaika's Score	Total Score
1	Roshni	N/A				19
2	Eksha	N/A				18.5
3	Swapna	N/A				15

== See also ==
- India's Next Top Model
- Top Model India
- Get Gorgeous
