= Hai Junoon! =

2025 Indian television series

- Genre: Musical; Drama
- Directed by: Abhishek Sharma
- Starring: Neil Nitin Mukesh; Jacqueline Fernandez
- Music by: Shankar Mahadevan
- Country of origin: India
- Original language: Hindi
- No. of episodes: 20

Production
- Producers: Aditya Bhat; Sagar Thakkar; Shekhar Yadav; Karan Bijlani
- Production location: Mumbai
- Cinematography: Amarjeet Singh
- Editors: Gaurav Arora; Jugal Shah; Ankussh Das; Ajay Mojidra
- Camera setup: Multi-camera
- Running time: 21–43 minutes
- Production company: Jio Creative Lab

Original release
- Network: JioHotstar
- Release: 16 May 2025

Hai Junoon! Dream. Dare. Dominate. (transl. There is Passion!) is a 2025 Indian musical drama television series directed by Abhishek Sharma. Produced under Jio Creative Lab, it stars Neil Nitin Mukesh and Jacqueline Fernandez. The series premiered on 16 May 2025 on JioHotstar.

== Cast ==
- Neil Nitin Mukesh as Gagan Ahuja
- Boman Irani as Professor Iyer
- Jacqueline Fernandez as Pearl Saldanha
- Sumedh Mudgalkar as Subhash "Sebi" Mhatre
- Siddharth Nigam as Bikram Singh
- Priyank Sharma as Kushal Lal
- Yukti Thareja as Swati
- Santana Roach as Shonali Agrawal
- Elisha Mayor as Munmun Chowdhary
- Saachi Bindra as Adah Shaikh
- Anusha Mani as Charulaxmi Iyer
- Aryan Katoch as SRK
- Bhavin Bhanushali as Ashutosh Jha
- Mohan Pandey as Jasmeet "Jazz"
- Devangshi Sen as Tahira Singh
- Sanchit Kundra as Tuhin
- Arnav Maggo as Saransh Dogra
- Kunwar Amar as Rohit
- Sharon Prabhakar as Dean Dr. Grace D'Souza
- Manan Kapur as Aryan
- Adrija Sinha as Mehak
- Purva Parag as Sebi's Mom
- Prachee Shah Paandya as Kush's Mom
- Aditya Rana as Aneesh Menon
- Kapil Kumar as Swati's Father
- Raghu Ram as MAK
- Shazahn Padamsee as Kritika (extended cameo)
- Anushka Sen as Natasha (cameo)
- Elnaaz Norouzi as Goldie (cameo)
- Mahesh Thakur as Sumer Sheikh (cameo)
- Rajesh Balwani as Brandy (cameo)
- Bosco Martis as Judge (cameo)
- Antara Mitra as Judge (cameo)
- Shankar Mahadevan as chief guest (cameo)
- Shiamak Davar as chief guest (cameo)

== Episodes ==
No. in season	Title	Directed by	Written by	Original release date
1	"Lekar Hum Deewana Dil"	Abhishek Sharma; Aditya Bhat	Vivian Chettiar; Sumedha Dogra; Rajdeep Ghosh; Ankit K. Sharma; Nishank Verma; Aditya Bhat	16 May 2025
2	"Rahen Na Rahen Hum"	Abhishek Sharma; Aditya Bhat	Vivian Chettiar; Sumedha Dogra; Rajdeep Ghosh; Ankit K. Sharma; Nishank Verma; Aditya Bhat	16 May 2025
3	"Yahan Ke Hum Sikandar"	Abhishek Sharma; Aditya Bhat	Vivian Chettiar; Sumedha Dogra; Rajdeep Ghosh; Ankit K. Sharma; Nishank Verma; Aditya Bhat	16 May 2025
4	"Jab Chhaye Mera Jadoo"	Abhishek Sharma; Aditya Bhat	Vivian Chettiar; Sumedha Dogra; Rajdeep Ghosh; Ankit K. Sharma; Nishank Verma; Aditya Bhat	16 May 2025
5	"Hai Apna Dil Toh Awara"	Abhishek Sharma; Aditya Bhat	Vivian Chettiar; Sumedha Dogra; Rajdeep Ghosh; Ankit K. Sharma; Nishank Verma; Aditya Bhat	16 May 2025
6	"Aaya Mausam Dosti Ka"	Abhishek Sharma; Aditya Bhat	Vivian Chettiar; Sumedha Dogra; Rajdeep Ghosh; Ankit K. Sharma; Nishank Verma; Aditya Bhat	16 May 2025
7	"Na Tum Jaano Na Hum"	Abhishek Sharma; Aditya Bhat	Vivian Chettiar; Sumedha Dogra; Rajdeep Ghosh; Ankit K. Sharma; Nishank Verma; Aditya Bhat	16 May 2025
8	"Arre Deewanon Mujhe Pehchano"	Abhishek Sharma; Aditya Bhat	Vivian Chettiar; Sumedha Dogra; Rajdeep Ghosh; Ankit K. Sharma; Nishank Verma; Aditya Bhat	16 May 2025
9	"Hum Naache Bin Ghunghroo Ke"	Abhishek Sharma; Aditya Bhat	Vivian Chettiar; Sumedha Dogra; Rajdeep Ghosh; Ankit K. Sharma; Nishank Verma; Aditya Bhat	16 May 2025
10	"Kal Kya Ho Kisne Jaana"	Abhishek Sharma; Aditya Bhat	Vivian Chettiar; Sumedha Dogra; Rajdeep Ghosh; Ankit K. Sharma; Nishank Verma; Aditya Bhat	16 May 2025
11	"Pag Ghunghroo Bandh"	Abhishek Sharma; Aditya Bhat	Vivian Chettiar; Sumedha Dogra; Rajdeep Ghosh; Ankit K. Sharma; Nishank Verma; Aditya Bhat	16 May 2025
12	"Hungama Ho Gaya"	Abhishek Sharma; Aditya Bhat	Vivian Chettiar; Sumedha Dogra; Rajdeep Ghosh; Ankit K. Sharma; Nishank Verma; Aditya Bhat	16 May 2025
13	"Dhindhora Baje Re"	Abhishek Sharma; Aditya Bhat	Vivian Chettiar; Sumedha Dogra; Rajdeep Ghosh; Ankit K. Sharma; Nishank Verma; Aditya Bhat	16 May 2025
14	"O Haseena Zulfonwali"	Abhishek Sharma; Aditya Bhat	Vivian Chettiar; Sumedha Dogra; Rajdeep Ghosh; Ankit K. Sharma; Nishank Verma; Aditya Bhat	16 May 2025
15	"Duniya Se Nahi Darega"	Abhishek Sharma; Aditya Bhat	Vivian Chettiar; Sumedha Dogra; Rajdeep Ghosh; Ankit K. Sharma; Nishank Verma; Aditya Bhat	16 May 2025
16	"Zindagi Ke Safar Mein"	Abhishek Sharma; Aditya Bhat	Vivian Chettiar; Sumedha Dogra; Rajdeep Ghosh; Ankit K. Sharma; Nishank Verma; Aditya Bhat	16 May 2025
17	"Kya Se Kya Hogaya"	Abhishek Sharma; Aditya Bhat	Vivian Chettiar; Sumedha Dogra; Rajdeep Ghosh; Ankit K. Sharma; Nishank Verma; Aditya Bhat	16 May 2025
18	"Parde Mein Rehne Do"	Abhishek Sharma; Aditya Bhat	Vivian Chettiar; Sumedha Dogra; Rajdeep Ghosh; Ankit K. Sharma; Nishank Verma; Aditya Bhat	16 May 2025
19	"Jeet Jayenge Hum"	Abhishek Sharma; Aditya Bhat	Vivian Chettiar; Sumedha Dogra; Rajdeep Ghosh; Ankit K. Sharma; Nishank Verma; Aditya Bhat	16 May 2025
20	"Kahan Shuru Kahan Khatam"	Abhishek Sharma; Aditya Bhat	Vivian Chettiar; Sumedha Dogra; Rajdeep Ghosh; Ankit K. Sharma; Nishank Verma; Aditya Bhat	16 May 2025

== Production ==
=== Development ===
Neil Nitin Mukesh had earlier expressed his interest on acting in a web series following the popularity of OTT platforms post the COVID-19 pandemic. Though he had received many offers to act in web series, Neil felt that most of them were repetitive and either were emulated or rehashed from successful web television shows. When he received the offer for this show, he felt excited as it was an opportunity to collaborate with artistes across all mediums, platforms, age groups and generations and an effort to make something unique, as it was based on the music and dance backdrop.

As Neil himself came from the musical lineage, he considered the show as an homage towards his grandfather and legendary playback singer Mukesh. He added "As far as my character Gagan Ahuja’s journey is concerned, my own journey and personal struggles have taught and provided me with so much of experience. When I read the character, I could relate with its arcing and lifespan. So, I said I want to be a part of this show." His character was a pianist, something which Neil had related to, as he used to play piano in his earlier days. He further added that director Abhishek Sharma and fellow showrunners Aditya Bhat and Sagar Thakkar fought for him to play the lead role.

Jacqueline Fernandez was cast as the parallel lead and a mentor of the rival group, the Misfits and Boman Irani, Sumedh Mudgalkar, Siddharth Nigam and Yukti Thareja were cast in important roles.

=== Filming ===
Principal photography of the series commenced in November 2023, and filming ended in July 2024. The filming took place in Mumbai, India. Neil added that as opposed to films', the web series provide ample time to evolve the characters and provide an arc, but he found the non-linear format to be a bit challenging as he had to remember what they shot and which turns out to be the characters' first scene. He ended up maintaning a notebook during the shoot to point down the characters' journey and their evolution on different points and maintained the same till the shoot.

A song featuring Fernandez was shot at Shiloh Bar in Andheri, which was choreographed by Ruel Dausan Varandani and featured around 200 dancers as the song blended numerous dance genres and served as the turning point in the story. The series was initially titled GOATS but was later renamed to Hai Junoon, which was named after a song from Neil's film New York (2009).

== Soundtrack ==
The soundtrack for Hai Junoon! is composed by Shankar Mahadevan. The musical event was attended by the cast.

== Release ==
Hai Junoon! premiered on JioHotstar on 16 May 2025.

== Reception ==
Pranati A S of Deccan Herald summarized "'Hai Junoon' will remind you of the teen-dramas that were popular during the mid '00s on the TV channels Star One and Channel V. It offers nothing new, apart from tackling issues that are comparatively newer. Student elections, campaigning, pretentious conversations, betrayal, social media influencers and romance, along with lots of dance rehearsals and song practices — after a point you're just tired of listening to covers of old songs. On the brighter side, the series tries to show how we are all fighting our own battles — the intensity of each is individual. And it also tries to promote mental health." Deepa Gahlot of Rediff.com said, "With its music made for dancing, Hai Junoon is aimed at a Gen Z audience. If this mindless fluff is what works with them, so be it; their parents can worry. After they have recovered from hitting the wall of deja vu head on!"

Archika Khurana of The Times of India wrote "To conclude, Hai Junoon is not a revolutionary musical drama, but it has enough soul, rhythm, and spirited performances to be an enjoyable watch—especially for fans of music, dance, and campus-based storytelling. It may not dominate, but it certainly dares and dreams. A decent, binge-worthy series." Nonika Singh of The Tribune wrote "There are flaws, but the passion behind the making of ‘Hai Junoon’ makes it more than watchable." Nirali Kanabar of Times Now wrote "All in all, Hai Junoon is a good concept that struggles under its ambition. The series deserves credit for addressing socially relevant issues, but the execution falls flat. A tighter narrative could've made this musical drama worth watching."

Chirag Sehgal of News18 wrote "Ultimately, Hai Junoon struggles to hold the audience’s attention — not due to a lack of talent or potential, but because the storytelling fails to deliver with clarity and cohesion." Hardika Gupta of NDTV wrote "Hai Junoon: Dream, Dare, Dominate is a sprawling, uneven series that tries to do too much with too little focus. Its heart is in the right place - championing passion, inclusivity, and self-expression - but the execution feels overstuffed, inconsistent, and lacking in narrative discipline. What could have been an inspiring ode to youthful dreams ends up feeling like a choreographed slog. For those craving a musical drama, the show offers sporadic moments of enjoyment, but it rarely sustains interest or delivers on its promise. With stronger writing, tighter editing, and more authentic character development, this series might have soared. Instead, it limps across the finish line." Aishwarya Vasudevan of OTTPlay wrote "Hai Junoon attempts to embrace a unique rhythm, yet ultimately treads on its own boundaries. While it claims to be a symphony of passion and inclusivity, it often feels like noise in search of a melody. Despite some foot-tapping numbers, the show hits more sour notes than high ones. This junoon fizzles out long before the final bow."
