= Yukti Thareja =

Indian model and actress (born 2000)

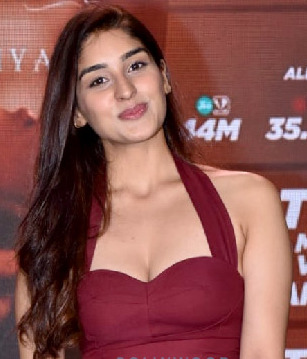
- Thareja in 2021
- Born: 6 January 2000 (age 26)
- Education: Sri Guru Gobind Singh College of Commerce
- Occupations: Model; Actress
- Years active: 2019–present

Yukti Thareja (born 6 January 2000) is an Indian model and actress. In 2019, she participated in the reality shows MTV Supermodel of the Year. She also appeared in the films Rangabali (2023) and Marco (2024).

== Early life ==
Thareja was born on 6 January 2000. She began her modeling career with "Oppo Delhi Times Fresh Face 2017", while pursuing her graduation from Sri Guru Gobind Singh College of Commerce, Delhi.

== Career ==
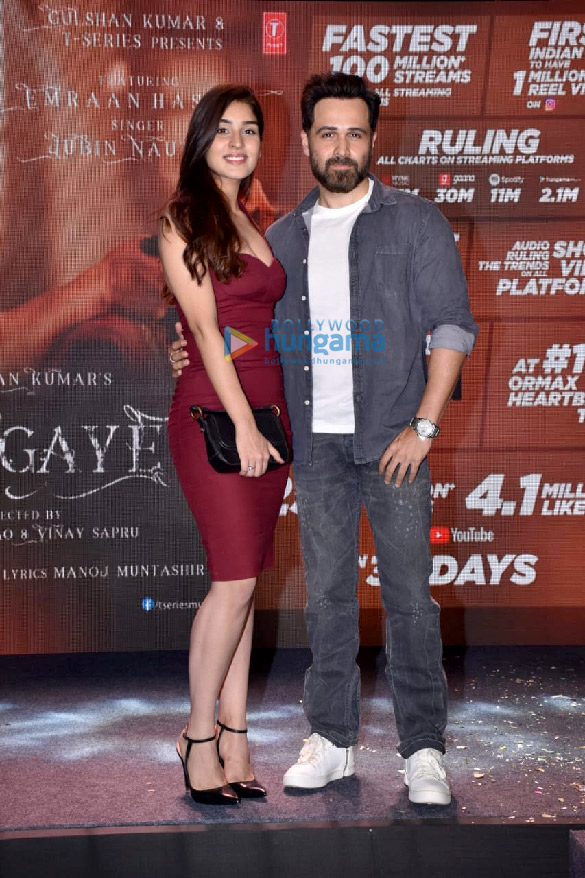
Thareja with Emraan Hashmi in Lut Gaye

In 2019, she participated in MTV Supermodel of the Year, where she was evicted at the 4th position. In 2020, she participated in MTV Ace The Quarantine. In 2021, Thareja appeared opposite Emraan Hashmi in T-Series music video "Lut Gaye", sung by Jubin Nautiyal. It has received more than 1.1 billion views on YouTube.

In 2023, she made her Tollywood film debut with Rangabali, opposite Naga Shaurya. The same year, she was chosen as the female lead for Devil: The British Secret Agent starring alongside Nandamuri Kalyan Ram. Later, she was replaced with Samyukhta Menon.

In 2024, she joined Unni Mukundan's Marco making her debut in Malayalam cinema. It became her highest grossing film. In 2025, she was seen in JioHotstar's musical drama series Hai Junoon! Dream. Dare. Dominate.. The same year, she appeared in a romantic comedy film opposite Kiran Abbavaram, titled K-Ramp.

Thareja is slated to appear in Telugu films King Jackie Queen opposite Dheekshith Shetty and in an untitled film opposite Nikhil Kumaraswamy.

== Filmography ==
=== Films ===
Year	Title	Role	Language	Ref.
2023	Rangabali	Dr. Sahaja Reddy	Telugu	
2024	Marco	Maria Anna Paul	Malayalam	
2025	K-Ramp	Mercy Joy	Telugu	
2026	KJQ: King Jackie Queen	Bhargavi	Telugu	
TBA	Untitled Nikhil Kumaraswamy film†	TBA	Kannada	

=== Television ===
Year	Title	Role	Notes	Ref.
2019	MTV Supermodel of the Year	Contestant	4th place	
2020	MTV Ace The Quarantine	Contestant	4th place	
2023	Suma Adda	Herself	Episode 26	
2025	Bigg Boss Telugu 9	Herself	Dasara Special	

=== Web series ===
Year	Title	Role	Language	Ref.
2025	Hai Junoon!	Swati	Hindi	
2025	Delhi Crime (Season 3)	ASI Simran Masih	Hindi	

== Music videos ==
Year	Title	Singer(s)	Co-actor	Ref.
2020	Ik Supna	Prabh Gill		
2021	Sasarvadi	Rajneesh Patel		
2021	Lut Gaye	Jubin Nautiyal	Emraan Hashmi	
2024	Galti	Vishal Mishra	Aayush Sharma	

== Awards ==
Year	Award	Category	Work	Result	Ref.
2023	South Indian International Movie Awards	Best Debut Actress	Rangabali	Nominated	
2024	South Indian International Movie Awards	Best Debut Actress	Marco	Nominated	
