= Tata Coffee =

Indian coffee company

- Formerly: Consolidated Coffee Estates (1922–66); Consolidated Coffee Limited (1966–2000)
- Type: Public Subsidiary
- Traded as: BSE: 532301; NSE: TATACOFFEE
- ISIN: INE493A01027
- Industry: Agriculture
- Predecessors: Coorg Co. Ltd.; Pollibetta Coffee Estates Co. Ltd.
- Founded: 1922; 104 years ago
- Defunct: 1 January 2024; 2 years ago
- Fate: Merged with Tata Consumer Products
- Successors: Tata Consumer Products
- Headquarters: No. 57, Railway Parallel Road, Kumara Park West, Bangalore, Karnataka, India
- Area served: Worldwide
- Key people: R. Harish Bhat (chairman); Chacko Purackal Thomas (MD & CEO)
- Products: Coffee • Tea • Pepper
- Revenue: ▲₹2,879.56 crore (US$300 million) (2023)
- Operating income: ▲₹272.60 crore (US$28 million) (2023)
- Net income: ▲₹321.16 crore (US$33 million) (2023)
- Total assets: ▲₹4,059.47 crore (US$420 million) (2023)
- Total equity: ▲₹2,351.18 crore (US$240 million) (2023)
- Parent: Tata Consumer Products (57.48%)
- Website: tatacoffee.com

Tata Coffee was an Indian company that produced coffee, tea, pepper and related products. It was a subsidiary of Tata Consumer Products, and part of the Tata Group. Tata Coffee was merged with Tata Consumer Products on 1 January 2024.

Tata Coffee owned 19 coffee estates in South India, spread across the districts of Chikmagalur, Kodagu, and Hassan in Karnataka, and Valparai district in Tamil Nadu. Tata Coffee was the largest integrated coffee plantation company in the world. Tata Coffee entered into a coffee sourcing and roasting agreement with Starbucks Coffee Company to supply coffee beans to its coffee chains in India. Both agreed to work toward developing and improving the profile of India-grown coffee around the world, as well as improving the quality of coffee through sustainable practices and advanced agronomy solutions. In 2012, the two companies launched the equal joint venture Tata Starbucks (formerly Tata Starbucks limited). According to the reports, Tata Coffee established a $50 million greenfield instant coffee facility in Vietnam.

== History ==
Tata Coffee traces its origins to 1922 when two coffee plantation companies—Coorg Co. Ltd., London and Pollibetta Coffee Estates Co. Ltd., London—were purchased by Edinburgh-based Matheson and Company and merged to form Consolidated Coffee Estates Ltd., Edinburgh. The merger created the largest coffee plantation in India. Consolidated Coffee Estates Ltd. had its registered office at 71 George Street in Edinburgh, Scotland. Ivor Bull, an employee of Matheson and Company, was appointed as the Chairman of Consolidated Coffee Estates in 1936 and arrived in Coorg to manage the coffee plantation. In 1943, Bull purchased Consolidated Coffee Estates Ltd. from Matheson, and registered it as an Indian company headquartered in Pollibeta. In the same year, shares in Consolidated Coffee Estates were offered to the general public through a prospectus. Its parent, Edinburgh Company, was allotted the majority stake as a consideration for transfer of its estates. In the following years, the Edinburgh Company divested its shareholdings to the Indian public and relinquished its controlling stake in 1966. Bull managed the company until 1966, after which he retired and returned to England where he lived on a farm in Suffolk until his death in 1971.

During 1966–67, Consolidated Coffee Estates was renamed as Consolidated Coffee Limited following the merger of Volkart properties in India, which included four estates, two curing works and an export division with Consolidated Coffee Estates. Tata Tea Ltd. (now Tata Consumer Products) acquired a 52.40% stake in Consolidated Coffee Limited in 1991. Asian Coffee Ltd., Veerarajendra Estates Ltd., and Charagni Ltd. merged with Consolidated Coffee Limited in September 1999, creating the largest integrated plantation company in the world. Consolidated Coffee Limited was renamed Tata Coffee Limited on 11 August 2000. Tata Coffee acquired a 34.2% stake in Indian coffeehouse chain Barista for ₹26 crore (equivalent to ₹99 crore or US$10 million in 2023) in August 2002. The company sold its stake in Barista to Chennai-based Sterling Infotech Group, promoted by C. Sivasankaran, in 2004.

Tata Coffee acquired 5 tea estates and one coffee estate located in the Anaimalais region in Tamil Nadu from its parent company, Tata Tea, in 2005. In the same year, the company also acquired an instant coffee facility at Theni, Tami Nadu from the High Hill Coffee Company. On 25 June 2006, Tata Coffee announced that it had acquired American coffee brand Eight O'Clock Coffee from Gryphon Investors for ₹1,015 crores (US$220 million).

Tata Coffee signed an agreement to supply coffee beans to American coffeehouse chain Starbucks in October 2004, which was the first time the latter had sourced coffee beans from India. In February 2013, Tata Coffee and Starbucks inaugurated a roasting and packaging facility at Kushalnagar, Karnataka to supply coffee beans to Tata Starbucks outlets in India and some Starbucks' overseas markets. The 8,258 sq ft facility has the capacity to produce 375 metric tonnes of coffee annually.

In March 2022, Tata Consumer Products announced that Tata Coffee would be dissolved as part of a reorganization plan. Under the plan, Tata Coffee's extraction and branded coffee business would be merged with the parent company, while its plantation business would become a part of TCPL Beverages & Foods, which is a wholly owned subsidiary of Tata Consumer Products. The merger became effective on 1 January 2024. Tata Coffee was delisted from stock exchanges on 15 January 2024.

== Awards ==
Since 2002, Tata Coffee has been consistently named the best coffee in India by the Coffee Board of India's annual Flavour of India – Fine Cup Award, holding the title, in 2017, for the seventh consecutive year.

In 2012, Tata Coffee was recognized for initiatives taken to mitigate climate change risks with the 2011 - 2012 Green Business Leadership Award by The Financial Express and Emergent Ventures India (FE-EVI), an integrated climate change company partnered with the Indian School of Business.

On 16 October 2017, Tata coffee was judged "Best Coffee in India" at the Ernesto Illy Second Annual International Coffee Awards.

== Conservation ==
Tata Coffee undertakes various conservation schemes and initiatives. The company protects over 1,075 hectares of rainforest within its coffee and tea estates. All 19 of Tata Coffee's estates are Rainforest Alliance, UTZ and SA8000 certified. In 2005, Tata Coffee provided land for a rainforest nursery to Nature Conservation Foundation, a Mysuru based non-governmental organization.
