= K-Ramp =

2025 Indian comedy drama film

- Theatrical release poster
- Directed by: Jains Nani
- Written by: Jains Nani
- Produced by: Razesh Danda; Balaji Gutta; Shiva Bommak
- Starring: Kiran Abbavaram; Yukti Thareja
- Cinematography: Sateesh Reddy Masam
- Edited by: Chota K. Prasad
- Music by: Chaitan Bharadwaj
- Production companies: Hasya Movies; Rudransh Celluloids
- Release date: 18 October 2025
- Running time: 141 minutes
- Country: India
- Language: Telugu
- Box office: est. ₹27.50 crore

K-Ramp is a 2025 Indian Telugu-language romantic comedy film written and directed by Jains Nani, starring Kiran Abbavaram and Yukti Thareja in the lead roles. The film was released theatrically on 18 October 2025, coinciding with Diwali week.

Despite mixed reviews, it was commercially successful at the box office.

== Plot ==
Kumar Abbavaram is a spoiled rich kid who lives for leisure, nightlife, and ego-driven charm. When Mercy, a kind yet traumatized woman battling PTSD, enters his life, he mistakes her empathy for affection. After his father sends him to Kerala to mature, Kumar slowly confronts the reality of Mercy’s mental health struggles. His misguided attempts to “save” her turn into a lesson in empathy and responsibility. K-Ramp follows a self-absorbed man’s uneasy transformation from entitlement to understanding.

== Cast ==
- Kiran Abbavaram as Kumar Abbavaram
- Yukti Thareja as Mercy Joy
- Sai Kumar as Krisha, Kumar’s father
- Naresh as Naresh, Kumar’s uncle and Bunty’s father
- Vennela Kishore as Bunty, Kumar’s cousin
- Muralidhar Goud as Daniel Joy, Mercy’s uncle
- Sanjay Swaroop as Dr.Sanjay, Mercy’s Psychiatrist
- Rajashri Nair as Sitha, Naresh's wife
- Anannyaa Akula as Anannyaa Bokka, Kumar’s bestfriend
- Kirrak Seetha as Priya, Mercy’s bestfriend
- Goparaju Ramana as Pavanachari, Priest
- Sivannarayana Naripeddi as College HOD
- Ali as Exam paper evaluator
- Srinivasa Reddy as Rao, Lecturer
- Mirchi Kiran as Lecturer
- Kamna Jethmalani as Mercy’s Psychiatrist's Wife (Cameo)
- Ajay as Albert, Mercy’s father (Cameo)
- Vimala Raman as Steffi, Mercy’s mother (Cameo)

== Production ==
The film was launched with a puja ceremony in early 2025 under the banners Hasya Movies and Rudransh Celluloids, with producers Razesh Danda and Shiva Bommak. Principal shooting began in May 2025

The first look poster was unveiled on 30 June 2025, depicting Abbavaram in a lungi with stylized backdrops (bottles in heart shape) and vibrant visuals that hint at a mass entertainer.

A promotional glimpse titled “The Richest Chiller Guy” was released on 14 July 2025, partially shot at Kochi Port, with the lead shown in a relaxed, swaggy avatar.

== Marketing and Release ==
A teaser was released on YouTube featuring cast and technical crew details. The promotional “Richest Chiller Guy” glimpse, stylized posters, and release date announcements have formed key parts of the marketing campaign and received criticism from some quarters for containing suggestive or risqué dialogue.

Kiran Abbavaram has publicly expressed that K-Ramp is encountering screen allocation challenges in Tamil Nadu, highlighting a perceived disparity in distribution for Telugu films in that region. The director explained that the ‘K’ stands for Kumar, the protagonist, and ‘ramp’ represents his journey.

The film received an "A" certificate due to the childhood scenes of heroine where her family said they will suicide. The censor board suggested to remove the scene as the scene may not suitable for younger audiences but the makers refused and instead went with A certificate.

== Reception ==
Paul Nicodemus of The Times of India rated the film 3/5 stars and wrote, "K-Ramp works as a watchable romantic entertainer with lively performances and humorous moments. A more cohesive first half and sharper writing could have elevated it further." Avad Mohammad of OTTPlay gave the film 2/5 stars and wrote, "K-Ramp is an out-and-out masala film that is over the top and lacks emotional depth. There is passable comedy in the second half, but the weak story and exaggerated performances make this film one with very limited appeal."

T. Maruthi Acharya of India Today gave it 1/5 stars and wrote, "Its humour fails, its emotions ring hollow, and its treatment of mental health and regional identity borders on offensive. [...] the film never knows when to stop joking or what counts as a joke." Srivathsan Nadadhur of The Hindu wrote, "Director Jains Nani’s patience-testing Telugu comedy drama makes a mockery of mental health issues [...] The only intermittent relief comes from a comedy track involving Vennela Kishore, who verbalises a viewer’s frustration with the film with his angsty, caustic responses."
