= KJQ: King Jackie Queen =

- Theatrical release poster
- Directed by: Kiran Kumar
- Written by: Kiran Kumar
- Produced by: Sudhakar Cherukuri
- Starring: Shashi Odela; Yukti Thareja; Dheekshith Shetty
- Cinematography: Nagesh Banell
- Edited by: Karthika Srinivas
- Music by: Poornachandra Tejaswi
- Production company: SLV Cinemas
- Release date: 7 August 2026
- Running time: 110 minutes
- Country: India
- Language: Telugu

KJQ: King Jackie Queen is a 2026 Indian Telugu language crime film directed by KK (Kiran Kumar) and produced by Sudhakar Cherukuri. The film is old directorial project of KK before his death last year. It stars Dheekshith Shetty, Yukti Thareja and Shashi Odela in the lead roles.

== Cast ==
- Shashi Odela as Jackie
  - Bhanu Prakash as Young Jackie
- Yukti Thareja as Bhargavi
  - Akshara Devalla as Young Bhargavi
- Dheekshith Shetty as Partha
  - Aakash Srinivas as Young Partha
- Rekha Nirosha as Bhanu, Partha’s wife
- Muralidhar Goud as Chacha, Partha’s father-figure
- Guru Somasundaram as Kamal Das, Bhanu’s father
- Ankur Vikal as Mastaan
- Prudhvi Raj as a Film Producer
- Supraj Ranga as Sandeep
- Manika Chikkala as Arija
- Surekha Vani as Rama
- Laxman Meesala as Srinu
- Karan Vijay as Police SI
- Harshith Chunduri as Mastaan’s son

== Development ==
The film was announced in February 2024.

== Release ==
The film was released on 7 August 2026.

== Critical reception ==
Srivathsan Nadadhur of The Hindu reviewed the film and wrote "The ending, heavily inspired by Mani Ratnam’s Nayakan, too, feels hardly original. Both the men indulge in long monologues, while the woman stands as a mute witness before tragedy strikes from an unexpected corner."

The film is also reviewed by TV9 Telugu and Eenadu.

NTV rated the movie 2.25/5 stars.
