= Tata Starbucks =

Joint venture company

Tata Starbucks Private Limited
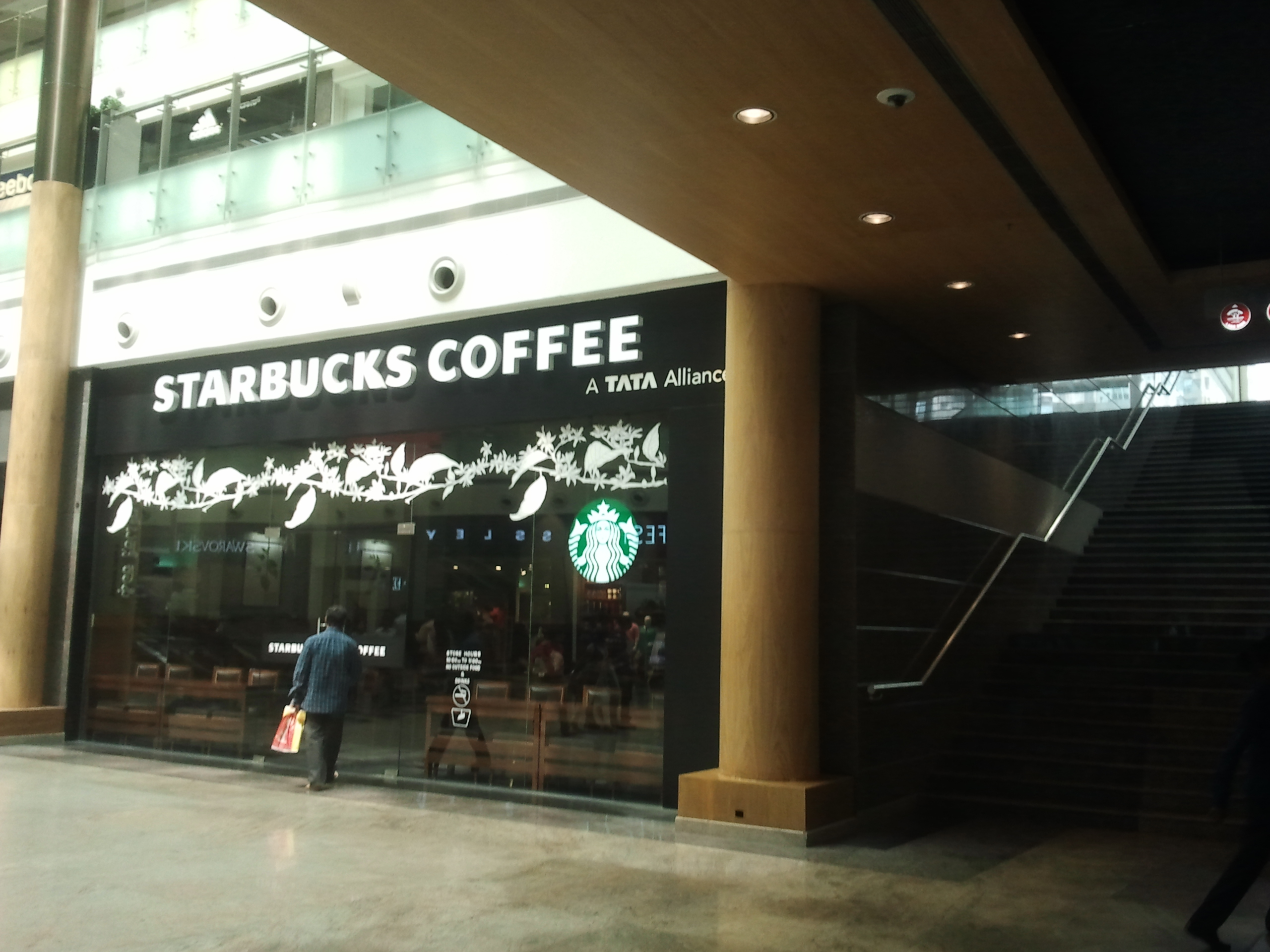
- Tata Starbucks' outlet in Orion Mall at Bengaluru, Karnataka
- Formerly: Tata Starbucks Limited
- Type: Joint venture
- Industry: Coffee shop
- Founded: 19 October 2012; Mumbai, Maharashtra, India
- Headquarters: Tower 2, Indiabulls Finance Center, Senapati Bapat Marg, Elphinstone Road, Mumbai, Maharashtra, India.
- Number of locations: Over 500 stores (Nov 2025)
- Area served: India
- Key people: Sushant Dash (CEO)
- Products: Coffee; Tea; Pastries; Frappuccino beverages; Smoothies
- Revenue: ▲₹1,367 crore (US$150 million) (FY26)
- Net income: ▼₹−99 crore (US$−11 million) (FY26)
- Owner: Starbucks Corporation (50%); Tata Consumer Products (50%)
- Number of employees: 4,383 (August 2025)
- Website: starbucks.in

Tata Starbucks Private Limited is an Indian coffeehouse company, which owns and operates Starbucks outlets in India. It is a 50:50 joint venture between Tata Consumer Products and Starbucks Corporation.

== History ==
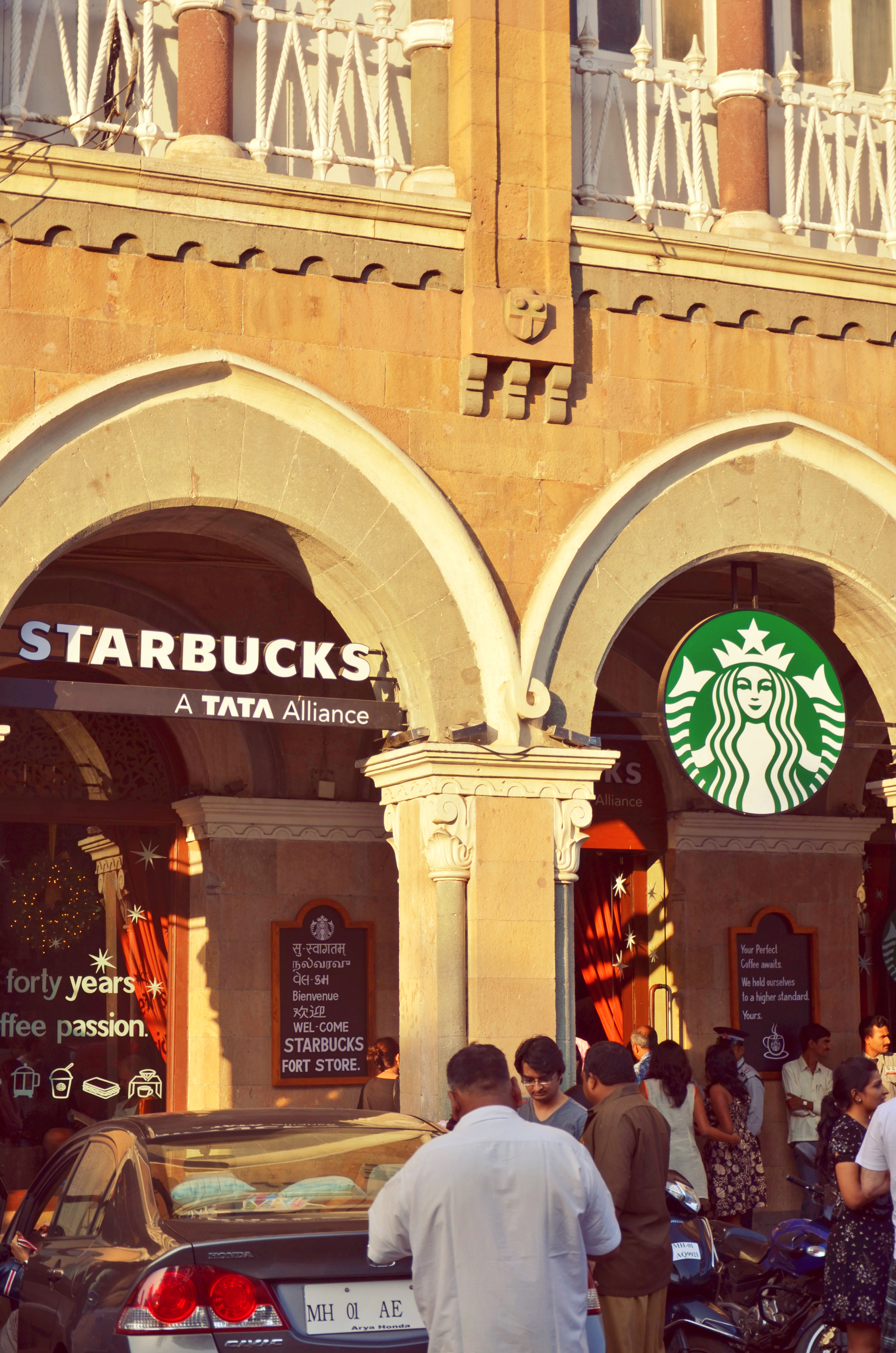
India's first Starbucks outlet at the Elphinstone Building, Horniman Circle, Mumbai.

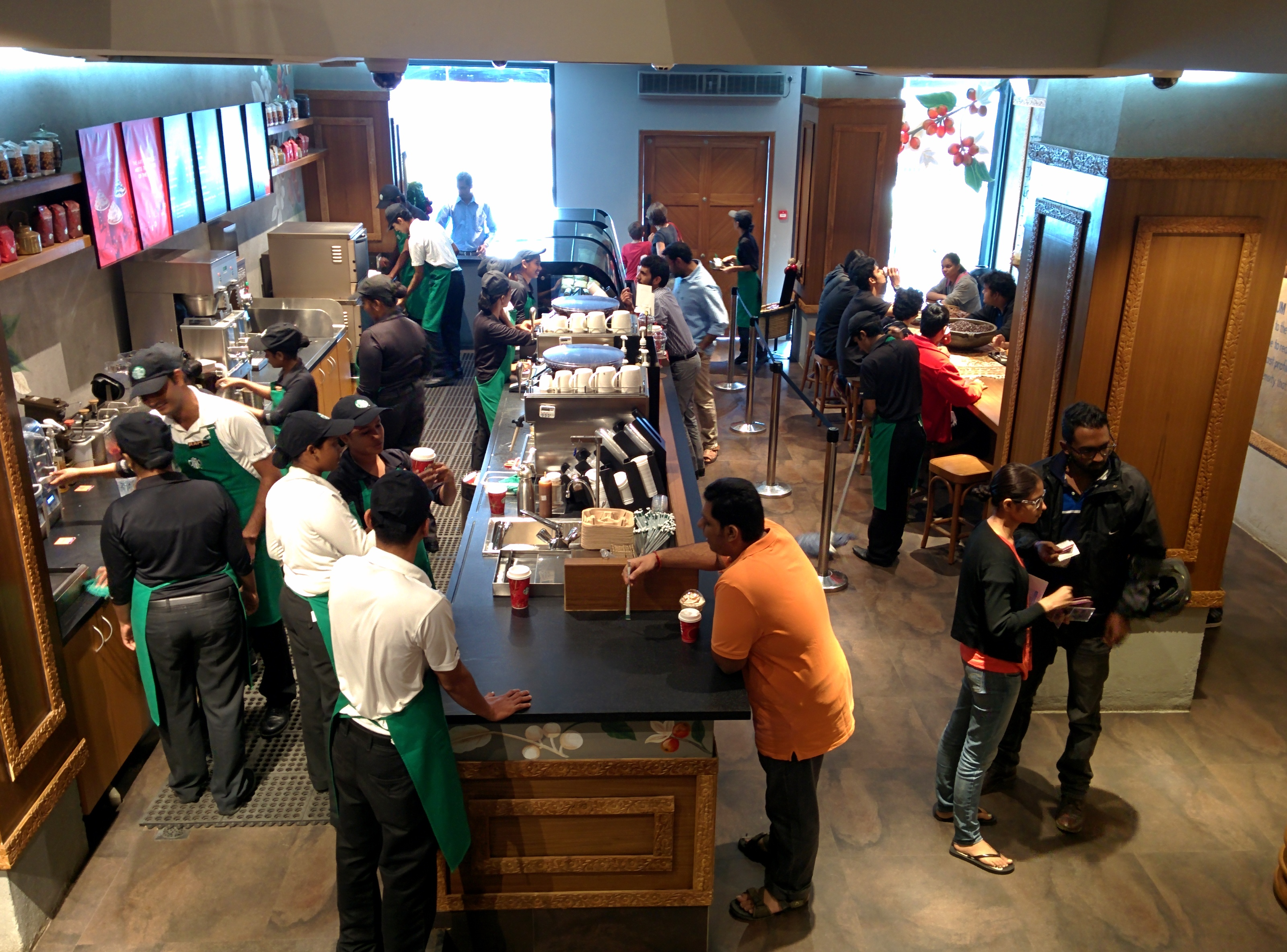
A Starbucks outlet in Bengaluru, Karnataka.

In January 2011, Starbucks Corporation and Tata Coffee announced plans to begin opening Starbucks locations in India. Starbucks had previously attempted to enter the Indian market in 2007.

On 19 October 2012, Starbucks opened its first store in India, measuring 4,500 sq ft in Elphinstone Building, Horniman Circle, Mumbai. Starbucks opened its first roasting and packaging plant to supply its Indian outlets in Kodagu, Karnataka in 2013.

Starbucks expanded its presence to Delhi on 24 January 2013 by opening 2 outlets at Terminal III of the Indira Gandhi International Airport, and later one in Connaught Place. Tata Global Beverages announced in 2013 that they would have 50 locations by the end of the year, with an investment of ₹4 billion (US$43 million). However, the company would open its 50th store in India only on 8 July 2014 in Chennai.

The third city of India to get a Starbucks outlet was Pune, where the company opened an outlet at Koregaon Park, on 8 September 2013. Starbucks opened a 3,000-square-foot flagship store at Koramangala, Bangalore on 22 November 2013, making it the fourth city to have an outlet.

Starbucks opened the largest coffee-forward store in the country at Vittal Mallya Road, Bangalore on 18 March 2019. The store measures 3,000 sq ft, and is Starbucks' 140th outlet in India. Tata Starbucks opened 25 stores in 2017–18 and 30 in the 2018–19 fiscal year. On 21 February 2019, CEO Navin Gurnaney announced that Tata Starbucks would transition to using only compostable and recyclable packaging materials across all its stores from June 2020.

Starbucks announced its entry into the Gujarat market on 7 August 2019. The company simultaneously opened five stores in Surat and Ahmedabad the next day. Starbucks' flagship store in the state is located at Prahlad Nagar, Ahmedabad and offers more vegetarian options than other Indian outlets. CEO Navin Gurnaney stated that the company would open more than 30 stores in the 2019–20 fiscal year, of which 11 had already opened. The company opened its 170th outlet and the first in Vadodara in December 2019. The first drive-through Starbucks outlet in India was opened at Zirakpur, Punjab on 13 July 2020. The company opened its 200th store at Amritsar, Punjab on 22 October 2020. Starbucks entered into Madhya Pradesh in February 2021 by opening 3 stores in Indore and Bhopal with further expansion plans in Indore. Starbucks entered Rajasthan by opening 2 stores in Jaipur in August 2021.

On 10 February 2021, the company announced that Navin Gurnaney was stepping down as CEO. Sushant Dash, who is currently President, Packaged beverages at Tata Consumer Products, replaced him as CEO effective 1 May 2021. Tata Starbucks opened 40 new stores in 2020–21, including expanding to 7 new cities, and the company opened 50 new stores in 2021–22, including expanding to 8 new cities.

In 2023, the company launched an advertisement campaign called #ItStartsWithYourName, featuring the transgender model and actress Siya Malasi.

== Products ==
Apart from the usual products offered internationally, Starbucks in India has some Indian-style product offerings such as Tandoori Paneer Roll, Chocolate Rossomalai Mousse, Malai Chom Chom Tiramisu, Elaichi Mewa Croissant, Chicken Kathi Roll and Murg Tikka Panini to suit Indian customers. All espressos sold in Indian outlets are made from Indian roasted coffee beans supplied by Tata Coffee. Starbucks also sells Himalayan bottled mineral water. Free Wi-Fi is available at all Starbucks stores.

In January 2017, Tata Starbucks introduced Starbucks' tea brand Teavana offering 18 different varieties of tea across its outlets in India. One of the varieties, called the India Spice Majesty Blend, was specifically developed for the Indian market and is only available in India. India Spice Majesty Blend is a blend of full leaf Assam black tea infused with whole cinnamon, cardamom, cloves, pepper, star anise and ginger.

On 15 June 2015, Tata Starbucks announced that it was suspending the use of ingredients that had not been approved by the Food Safety and Standards Authority of India (FSSAI). The company did not specify what the ingredients were or which products they were used. The company also stated that it was in the process of applying for FSSAI approval for these ingredients.

Tata Starbucks launched the Starbucks Delivers program in early 2019. The service offers home delivery from Starbucks outlets through a partnership with Swiggy. The service was first launched in Mumbai, with plans to roll it out to other cities.

== Locations ==
As of October 2024, Starbucks operates over 457 outlets in more than 70 cities of India.

== Legal issues ==
The US-based Starbucks Corporation filed a lawsuit in the Delhi High Court in July 2018 against Delhi-based coffee chain SardarBuksh for allegedly copying their name and logo. The owner of SardarBuksh agreed to change its name on 28 September 2018. Sanmeet Singh Kalra, co-founder of SardarBuksh, said, "Our name rhymed with Starbucks which is why the court has ruled in their favour." Kalra also stated that his company would not change its logo. Its logo features a circle of green and black with a figure at the centre, similar to the Starbucks logo, except with a man in a turban instead of a mermaid.

In March 2019, an investigation by the Directorate General of Anti Profiteering (DGAP) found Tata Starbucks guilty of profiteering ₹45.1 million (US$480,000) by not reducing the goods and services tax (GST) charged on coffee. The GST Council had reduced the tax rate on restaurants from 18% to 5% from 17 November 2017. However, the DGAP found that Tata Starbucks had raised the base price of one coffee variant such that its retail price remained the same even after the tax rate was reduced. The case was pending before the National Anti-Profiteering Authority (NAA), which will issue the final verdict. In November 2020, the NAA upheld the findings of the DGAP's investigation, fined Tata Starbucks an amount of ₹1.04 crore (US$110,000) plus 18% interest, and ordered the company to "reduce the prices of products so that the benefits of tax reduction is passed on to the recipients".

== International presence ==
The Tata Group and Starbucks Corporation also collaborate on some ventures outside India. Starbucks Reserve Tata Nullore Estates, the first-ever Starbucks Reserve coffee sourced exclusively from India, became the first Indian coffee to be roasted and sold at Starbucks home city of Seattle in 2016. The coffee was later rolled out across Starbucks outlets in the United States. In the same year, Starbucks began selling Himalayan bottled mineral water at its outlets in Singapore and also began retailing its products on board all flights of Vistara, a joint venture between the Tata Group and Singapore Airlines.

== See also ==
- Café Coffee Day
