= Renee Kujur =

Indian fashion model (born 1986)

- Born: Renu Kujur; 1985 (age 40–41); Pirai, Jashpur district, Chhattisgarh, India
- Occupation: Fashion model
- Years active: 2016–present
- Modeling information
- Height: 5 ft 7 in (1.70m)
- Hair color: Black
- Eye color: Brown
- Agency: Beverly Models; Benz and Beadz Models India; Satin Models India; TFM/360 Models India

Renee Kujur is an Indian fashion model. She is known as a doppelganger to international R&B singer Rihanna. She is also called Rihanna 2.0 or India's very own Rihanna.

== Personal life ==
Renee Kujur was born in a Kurukh Adivasi (Scheduled Tribe) family in 1985 in Pirai village of Bagicha Tehsil in Jashpur district of Indian state of Chhattisgarh. She faced prejudice and criticism for her skin tone and features. When she was 3 years old, she was called 'black-fairy' by her classmates as she participated in a fancy dress competition at her school as a fairy. The incident had a lasting effect on her as a 3-year-old kid. She was called kaali (a girl with dark skin) in her teenage. She started working at Tommy Hilfiger store as sales staff where people started noticing that she look like Rihanna. Once she realized her resemblance to Rihanna, things changed for her. She revealed that she would her journey will complete the day she meet her idol Rihanna.

== Career ==
Renee Kujur works as a model based in Malviya Nagar, New Delhi. Her photos of striking resemblance to Rihanna made her internet sensation. She works for Satin Models India and has worked with designers like Pam Mehta, Chetan Chiller and Vijay Balhara. She walked for India Runway Week and Asian Designer Week. She did modeling for brands like Reebok and Nift. She was felicitated by Fashion Design Council of India (FDCI) at 2018 India Couture Week gala. She is working to combat discrimination against dark-skinned models around the world. In 2019, she participated in the first season of India's modelling competition, MTV Supermodel of the Year.
