= Daniel Bauer (make-up artist) =

Australian make-up artist and hairstylist

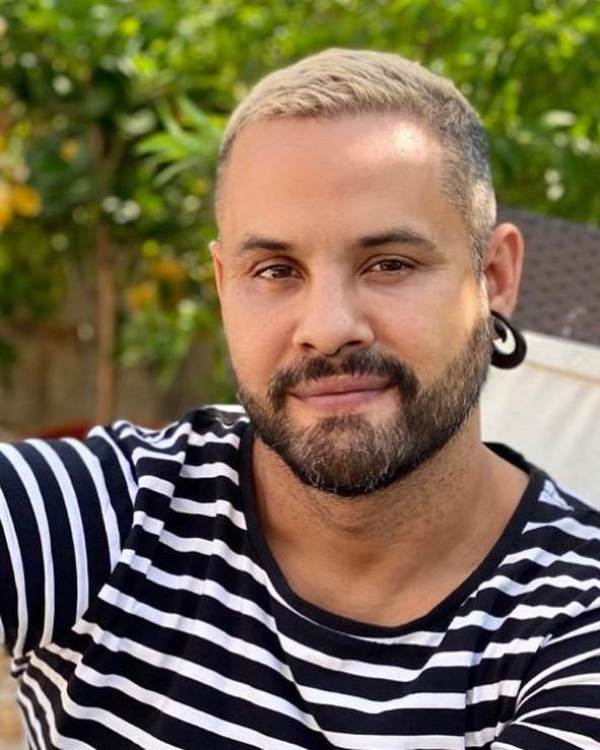
- Born: 8 July 1976 (age 49); Perth, Australia
- Occupation(s): Celebrity hair and makeup artist

Daniel Bauer (born 8 July 1976) is an Australian-born, Mumbai-based make-up artist and hairstylist known for his red carpet makeup work for Bollywood celebrities, his work for the Lakme Fashion Week and his makeup and hair styling academy. In 2017, he founded Daniel Bauer Academy, a renowned hair and makeup academy.

== Career ==
In 2005, Bauer moved to Sydney to further his career. After an assignment in India in 2008, he began working in India full-time.

In June 2014, the Bollywood group known as the Cine Costume Make-Up Artist & Hair Dressers' Association (CCMAA) authorized an official protest on the movie set of Bang Bang! in protest of Bauer working on the movie for its lead actress, Katrina Kaif. The CCMAA and 15 of its members protested on the movie set as Bauer was not registered with the union, despite the union banning foreign artists working in Bollywood. The issue was resolved with the CCMAA granting Bauer full membership.

In 2017, he launched the Daniel Bauer Academy for makeup and hair studies to provide students with practical industry knowledge and skills.

In 2019, Bauer joined MyGlamm as their Global Makeup Director. He is also the brand ambassador of Lakme and Tresemme.

He worked as a stylist for Bollywood actresses for their red carpet glamour and bridal makeup, and for actresses featured in Vogue China, Elle Thailand, Harpers Bazaar India and Paper Magazine.

== Awards ==
- Vogue Makeup Artist of the Year 2015

== LGBT ==
Bauer is openly gay and his wedding to his partner Tyrone Braganza was part of the Netflix series The Big Day in 2021. This was the first same-sex wedding to feature on Netflix.
