= Rana Naidu =

2023 Indian action crime drama series

- Promotional poster
- Genre: Action; Crime drama
- Created by: Karan Anshuman
- Based on: Ray Donovan
- Written by: Karmanya Ahuja; Anany Mody; B. V. S. Ravi; Vaibhav Vishal; Karan Anshuman; Dialogues: Vaibhav Vishal
- Screenplay by: B. V. S. Ravi
- Story by: Ananya Mody
- Directed by: Suparn Verma; Karan Anshuman
- Starring: Arjun Rampal; Venkatesh Daggubati; Rana Daggubati; Suchitra Pillai; Rajni Basumatary; Gaurav Chopra; Surveen Chawla
- Music by: Sangeet-Siddharth
- Composer: John Stewart Eduri
- Country of origin: India
- Original languages: Hindi; Telugu
- No. of seasons: 2
- No. of episodes: 18

Production
- Executive producers: Mohit Shah; Pearl Gill
- Producers: Sunder Aaron; Sumit Shukla
- Cinematography: Jaya Krishna Gummadi (Season 1); John Schmidt (Season 2)
- Editors: Ninad Khanolkar; Manan Ashwin Mehta
- Running time: 39–50 minutes
- Production company: Locomotive Global Inc.

Original release
- Network: Netflix
- Release: March 10, 2023 – present

Rana Naidu is an Indian action crime drama television series on Netflix directed by Karan Anshuman and Suparn Verma. It is the Netflix’s first Telugu original series. Adapted from the popular American Showtime series Ray Donovan.

On 19 April 2023, the show was renewed for a second season, starring Arjun Rampal as the antagonist.

== Cast ==
- Venkatesh Daggubati as Naga Naidu; Rana, Tej, Jaffa, and Arjun Naidu's father
- Rana Daggubati as Rana Naidu, Naga's son
- Sushant Singh as Tej Naidu, Rana and Jaffa's elder brother
- Abhishek Banerjee as Pawan "Jaffa" Naidu, Rana and Tej's younger brother
- Surveen Chawla as Naina Naidu, Rana's wife
- Ishitta Arun as Anna, a nurse and Tej's love interest
- Rajesh Jais as OB Mahajan, Rana's boss and politician
- Gaurav Chopra as Prince Reddy, an actor; OB and Rana's associate
- Ashish Vidyarthi as Surya Rao Naidu/Surya Mohammed Khan, Naga's older brother and former boss; Tej, Rana, and Jaffa's uncle
- Suchitra Pillai as Tara, Naga's love interest
- Rajni Basumatary as Nyla, Naga's former love interest and Arjun's mother
- Adithya Menon as Srini, Rana's right-hand man
- Flora Saini as Kavya, OB's sister-in-law and mistress
- Priya Banerjee as Mandira Sharma, Bollywood actress and Farzad's girlfriend
- Nishigandha Wad as Vandana Mahajan, OB's wife
- Ashwin Mushran as Farzad Soonawala, Prince Reddy's producer; OB and Rana's associate
- Tenzin Dalha as Arjun Naidu, Rana, Tej, and Jaffa's half-brother
- Mukul Chadda as CBI officer Ejaz Shaikh
- Bodhisattva Sharma as Rehan
- Afrah Sayed as Nitya Naidu, Rana and Naina's daughter; Naga's granddaughter
- Madhav Dhingra as Anirudh "Ani" Naidu, Rana and Naina's son; Naga's grandson
- Heeba Shah as Anjali
- Lauren Robinson as Lara, Rana's investigative assistant
- Supriya Aysola as Padma Naidu, Surya's wife
- Saurav Khurana as Cricketer Zayed Mirza
- Milind Pathak as Vijayawada Maharaja
- Siya Malasi as Chandni
- Abhishek Bhalerao as Inspector Malvade
- Anuj Khurana as Aman Khanna / Prince Vithal
- Janu Kumar as Pamma
- Zessica Harison
- Arjun Rampal as Rauf Mirza
- Dino Morea as Inspector Naveen Joshi
- Kriti Kharbanda as Alia Oberoi
- Rajat Kapoor as Viraj Oberoi, Alia and Chirag's father
- Tanuj Virwani as Chirag Oberoi, Alia's brother
- Aditi Shetty as Tasneem, Jaffa's love interest
- Himanshu Malhotra as Paritosh, Alia's husband
- Astad Kale as Inspector Tope
- Akhilesh Naidu as IPS Naidu

== Episodes ==
=== Season 1 (2023) ===
Rana Naidu (season 1) episodes
No. overall	No. in season	Title	Directed by	Written by	Original release date	Summary
1	1	"He's back"	TBA	TBA	March 10, 2023	Rana Naidu works as a fixer for Bollywood celebrities, cleaning up their scandals. When his father Naga is unexpectedly released from prison after 15 years, Rana's carefully built world begins to unravel.
2	2	"Teen Karod"	TBA	TBA	March 10, 2023	Rana handles a blackmail case involving superstar Prince Reddy, while also trying to protect his daughter from bullying. Naga struggles to reconnect with his family after his long absence.
3	3	"Koi mar gaya kya?"	TBA	TBA	March 10, 2023	Naga takes Jaffa and Arjun on a trip to re-establish an old connection while Rana plots to kill two birds with one stone. OB hosts a Diwali party but his sins catch up with him.
4	4	"Baap bete ke rishte"	TBA	TBA	March 10, 2023	Rana helps Toofan get custody of Rehaan but soon finds himself in a tough spot when things take a turn for the worse. Meanwhile, Naga shows up at Prince's screening.
5	5	"Kitna gurda, kitna goo"	TBA	TBA	March 10, 2023	Rana attempts to shut down the CBI investigation. OB is prepped for a risky surgery. Jaffa hosts a housewarming party but it goes out of control.
6	6	"Bheje ku light, gote ku tight"	TBA	TBA	March 10, 2023	Rana goes to Hyderabad to strike a deal with a ghost from the past. Meanwhile, the CBI mounts pressure on Naga.
7	7	"Nitya"	TBA	TBA	March 10, 2023	Rana, Tej, and Jaffa toast the birth anniversary of their sister but its riddled with interruptions. India's most wanted man takes a road trip to Mumbai.
8	8	"Tu kya kiya?"	TBA	TBA	March 10, 2023	Ani wants to go to an awards show with Prince. Meanwhile, Rana's plan with Surya is put into action. Naga has a rendezvous.
9	9	"Maharaj"	TBA	TBA	March 10, 2023	Rana is called to handle a crisis at Tej's studio. Srini is sent to keep an eye on Naina and the kids. The police question Naga about a recent murder.
10	10	"Game Over g*ndu"	TBA	TBA	March 10, 2023	Rana and Srini go all in for the hunt. Rana tries to flush out Surya but his plan backfires. Naga's actions come full circle.

=== Season 2 (2025) ===
Rana Naidu (season 2) episodes
No. overall	No. in season	Title	Directed by	Written by	Original release date	Summary
11	1	"One Last Job"	TBA	TBA	June 13, 2025	Rana Naidu attempts to retire from his life as a fixer and focus on his family, but his son Ani is kidnapped by the gangster Rauf. Forced back into the criminal underworld, Rana seeks help from his estranged father, Naga. Together, they plan Ani's rescue with the assistance of powerful ally Viraj Oberoi.
12	2	"Bada Kutta"	TBA	TBA	June 13, 2025	While Rana confronts Rauf in prison, his wife Naina grows emotionally distant and confides in a new acquaintance, Naveen. Meanwhile, Rana tries to balance Ani's safety with keeping his criminal dealings away from his children.
13	3	"Well Played Mr. Naidu"	TBA	TBA	June 13, 2025	Rauf begins blackmailing Rana to bend him to his will. Ani's birthday celebration turns tense as Rana and Naina's marital strain deepens, and family tensions threaten to boil over.
14	4	"Kacchaa Limbu"	TBA	TBA	June 13, 2025	Naga and Tej execute a dangerous heist at Oberoi Studios, seeking leverage against Viraj. Elsewhere, Naina's closeness with Naveen unsettles Rana. Rana struggles to protect both his family and his brother Jaffa, who is preparing for his marriage to Tasneem.
15	5	"It Will Never Be Okay"	TBA	TBA	June 13, 2025	After Tej is brutally attacked in prison, Rana makes desperate attempts to free him. At the same time, Nitya becomes trapped in a violent shootout, escalating Rana's fear that his family will never be safe from the consequences of his life.
16	6	"Double Dholki"	TBA	TBA	June 13, 2025	Owing Viraj Oberoi a debt, Rana is coerced into covering up the murder of Paritosh. Anjali manipulates Naga into carrying out a dangerous mission, while Naina's relationship with Naveen continues to test her loyalty to Rana.
17	7	"Sumdi Mein Lomdi"	TBA	TBA	June 13, 2025	Naveen seizes an opportunity to frame Rana for a crime, hoping to drive a wedge between him and Naina. During the wedding festivities of Jaffa and Tasneem, Rauf launches a deadly ambush, leaving Tej critically injured and Tasneem wounded.
18	8	"One Last Job Again"	TBA	TBA	June 13, 2025	The Naidu family reels from the wedding attack as Tej fights for his life. Rana finally confronts Rauf and kills him. Before dying, Rauf reveals that OB Mahajan betrayed Rana by leaking Nitya's whereabouts. Rana confronts OB with a gun, forcing him to face his guilt. Later, at Tej's funeral, police arrest Rana for Rauf's murder. As Rana is taken away, Naga vows to break him out, setting up the continuation of the story.

== Production ==
=== Development ===
The series was officially announced on 21 September 2021 by Netflix media press release.

=== Filming ===
Principal photography commenced from October 2021. The series was officially wrapped up shooting in May 2022.

=== Marketing ===
In September 2021, a short clip from the series was released from the Netflix Tudum event. The series official teaser was released in September 2022. The official released on February 15, 2023.

== Release ==
The series is streaming on Netflix from March 10, 2023, in both Hindi and Telugu languages.

== Reception ==
Sangeetha Devi Dundoo for The Hindu wrote "Beneath all that dressing up of sex, alcohol and expletives, Rana Naidu has an undercurrent of pathos. Cinematographer Jayakrishna Gummadi uses warm and dark tones to accentuate the grim atmosphere, aided by John Stewart Eduri's background score."

Raghu Bandi for The Indian Express wrote "The overall story-broken family working hard to come together-actually suits Indian sensibilities. But the way it is treated is not to everyone's taste."

Saibal Chatterjee for NDTV rated 2.5 stars out of 5 and wrote "As a series of ten episodes of an average of 50 minutes each, it had the potential for significant tonal variations. A lot of it remains unrealised because the show never quite breaks into a canter. Parts of Rana Naidu are monotonous."

Deepa Gahlot saw a mix of violence and sex in the series and wrote for Rediff.com in her review "Profane language is now par for the course for series about gangsters and a liberal sprinkling of cuss words do not even register anymore. But even so, the overuse of the 'G' word is simply annoying."

Vijayalakshmi Narayanan for The Free Press Journal rated the series 1 star out of 5 and wrote "With cusswords and sexually explicit scenes hitting you like a ton of bricks, you'd have to wonder how 'Rana Naidu' was approved for viewing despite 'College Romance', a relatively harmless show about youngsters, facing a legal notice from the Delhi High Court for 'obscene and vulgar' language."

Deep Haider of India Today rated the series 2.5 stars out of 5 and wrote "Rana Naidu could have been a welcome relief from the worldwide wokeness that has afflicted our creative spaces. It does not."

Udita Jhunjhunwala of Scroll.in wrote "It appears as though the creators directed Rana Daggubati to be one-note. If so, he's aced it. He rarely smiles and barely gives his rage a break. In the moments when Rana Naidu quietly, but visibly, masks his judgement or extends a compassionate gesture, you feel a connection with him, but briefly."

Haricharan Pudipeddi for Hindustan Times wrote "Rana Naidu takes the whole family dynamics and gives it a sinister twist. Here's a family that's more flawed than one can even imagine."

Sanchita Jhunjhunwala of Zoom TV rated the series 4 stars out of 5 and wrote "A well written and directed series is one which has a balance of what it tells us it has to offer. As a crime drama, there's just enough crime going on and at the same time, there's also a lot of drama - be it the family, the kids, or the politics, among other things."

== See also ==
- List of Netflix India Originals
