= Barista (company) =

Indian coffee drink company

Barista Coffee Shop
- Company type: Public
- Industry: Coffee House
- Founded: 2000; 26 years ago
- Headquarters: 301–304, Vipul Agora Mall, MG Road, Gurugram, Haryana, India
- Number of locations: over 425 cafes (March 2024) (140+ cities)
- Area served: India; Sri Lanka; Maldives
- Key people: Rajat Agrawal (CEO)
- Products: Coffee; Tea; Desserts; Shakes; Smoothies; Quenchers; Sandwiches; Cakes
- Website: barista.co.in

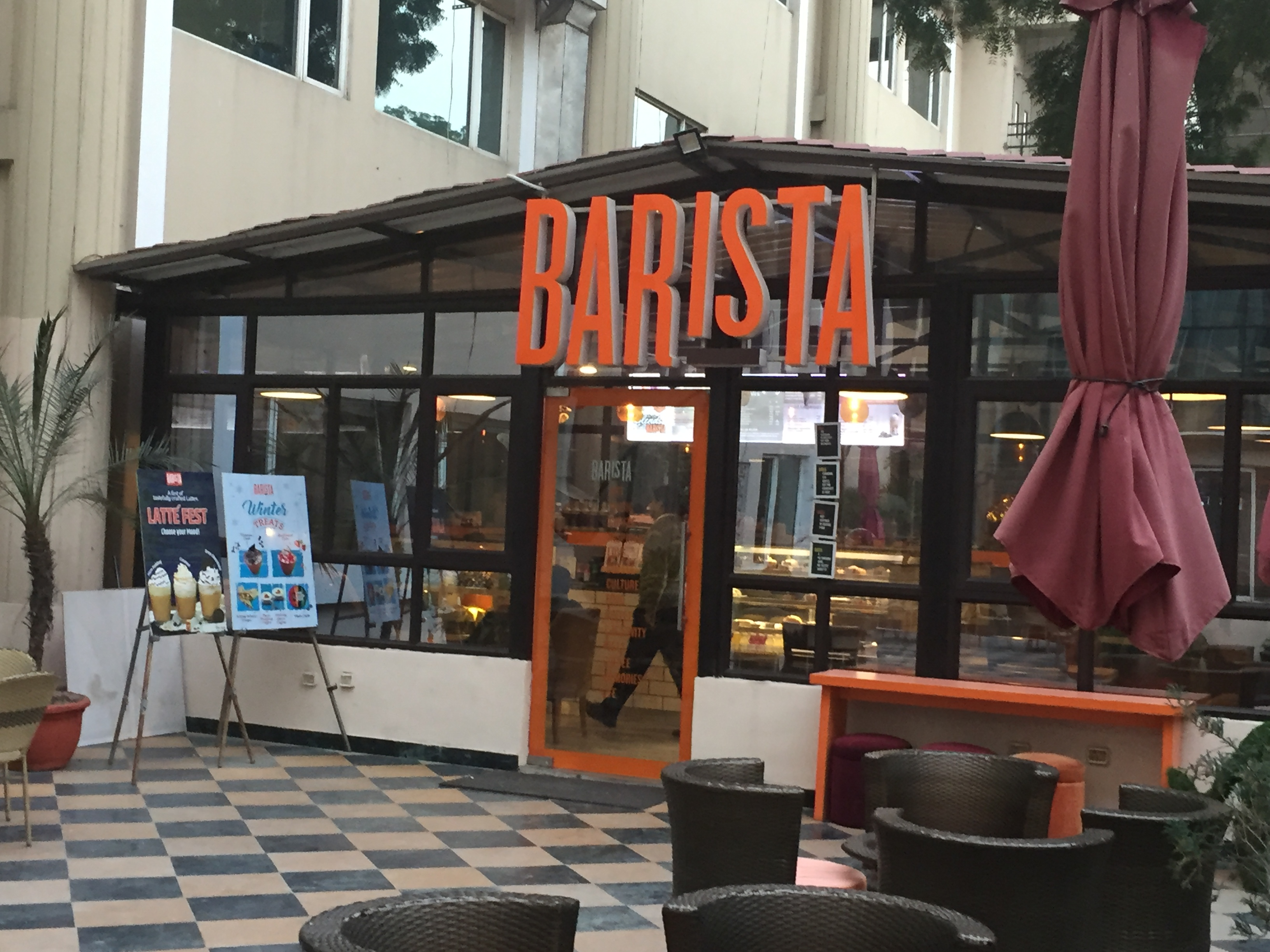
Barista Store Front

Barista is a chain of espresso bars and cafes that operates in the Indian subcontinent. It is headquartered in Gurugram, India, and maintains outlets across India, and in other regional countries such as Sri Lanka, and Maldives. It is the second oldest coffee house chain in India and is currently India's second-largest coffee chain with over 425 cafes as of March 2024. It also sells a number of FMCG products through Modern & General retail stores across multiple locations.

In Sri Lanka, Barista has been named the most popular service provider under cafes and coffeehouses category for 2021 in the exclusive customer experience ranking announced by LMD.

== History ==
=== Tata Group ===
A 34.3% equity stake was sold to Tata Coffee in 2001.

=== Sterling Infotech Group ===
C Sivasankaran bought the remaining 65 per cent in Barista from the Amit Judge-controlled Turner Morrison in 2004, and his Sterling Group also bought out Tata Coffee's stake later. The coffee was supplied by the Indian roaster Fresh and Honest, headquartered in Chennai, which was also owned by the Sterling Infotech Group.

ABN AMRO and Barista Coffee Company had jointly launched a credit card, "ABN AMRO Barista Credit Card", by which customers can avail discounts at its outlets.

=== Lavazza ===
In 2007, the Sterling Group sold Barista, along with the Chennai-based Fresh and Honest roaster, to Lavazza. As of 2009, the chain had 200 stores in India, with an estimated annual revenue of ₹200 crore.

Lavazza sold Barista to Boutonniere Hospitality Private Limited in 2014 (formerly “Carnation Hospitality Private Limited”).

=== Boutonniere Hospitality Private Limited ===
In 2014, Lavazza sold the coffee shop chain to Boutonniere Hospitality Pvt. Ltd., formerly known as Carnation Hospitality Pvt. Ltd. Lavazza however continues to supply the coffee to Barista through the Chennai-based Fresh and Honest roaster retained by the company.

Boutonniere Hospitality Pvt. Ltd. targets to increase the footprint of Barista by increasing the number of cafes to 1000, and the number of stores selling its consumer products to 1000, by 2025.

== See also ==
- Cafe Coffee Day – As of 2011, out of 1400 coffee shop retail outlets registered in India, 2016 belong to Cafe Coffee Day (CCD). To increase CCD's market presence in India and abroad, Coffee Day Holdings, the parent company of CCD, has secured investments totalling million from UK based firm Standard Chartered Private Equity Limited and US based private equity and venture capital firm New Silk Route Partners. CCD is expanding their market reach through brand extension by launching mineral water, cookies, and chips under their brand name. Barista has added a variety of cookies, chocolates and ice creams to their offerings under the same principle. While CCD's competitors like Barista Lavazza and Costa Coffee focus on the top 20 percent of the Indian consumers, who are able to afford over per espresso drink, CCD caters to all except the lowest 25 percent.
- Costa Coffee – Despite Costa Coffee having only 40 outlets operational across the country as of 2010, Barista Lavazza is facing stiff competition from Costa Coffee. Costa Coffee is an urban chain and location plays a crucial role in its business plan. Although it made a few mistakes such as replicating the UK model in India and opening stores at expensive locations when it came to India in 2005, it has managed to bounce back. Their most profitable venture is from off premises business wherein they set up kiosks at marriages, seminars, and meetings. In the last quarter of 2009, Costa saw a profitable 24 percent growth.
