= List of Harper's Bazaar India cover models =

This article is a catalog of actresses and models who have appeared on the cover of Harper's Bazaar India, the Indian edition of Harper's Bazaar magazine, starting with the magazine's first issue in March 2009.

== 2000s ==
=== 2009 ===
| Issue | Cover model | Photographer |
|---|---|---|
| March | Kareena Kapoor | |
| April | Deepika Padukone | |
| May | Mehr Jesia | |
| June | Sonam Kapoor | |
| July/August | Priyanka Chopra | |
| September | Bipasha Basu | |
| October | Shilpa Shetty | |
| November | Sussanne Khan | |
| December | Lara Dutta | |

== 2010s ==
=== 2010 ===
| Issue | Cover model | Photographer |
|---|---|---|
| January/February | Lisa Haydon | |
| March | Hrithik Roshan & Katrina Kaif | |
| April | Dia Mirza | |
| May | Kalki Koechlin | |
| June | Nethra Raghuraman | |
| July/August | Kangana Ranaut | |
| September | Deepika Padukone | |
| October | Katrina Kaif | |
| November | Twinkle Khanna | |
| December | Freida Pinto | |

=== 2011 ===
| Issue | Cover model | Photographer |
|---|---|---|
| January/February | Karisma Kapoor | |
| March | Priyanka Chopra | |
| April | Giselli Monteiro | |
| May | Malaika Arora Khan | |
| June | Jyothsna Chakravarthy | |
| July/August | Lara Dutta | |
| September | Sonam Kapoor | |
| October | Angela Jonsson; Shah Rukh Khan; Lisa Haydon | |
| November | Deepika Padukone | |
| December | Katrina Kaif | |

=== 2012 ===
| Issue | Cover model | Photographer |
|---|---|---|
| January/February | Nargis Fakhri | |
| March | Vidya Balan | |
| April | Sonam Kapoor | |
| May | Jacqueline Fernandez | |
| June | Angela Jonsson | |
| July/August | Parineeti Chopra | |
| September | Ileana D'Cruz | |
| October | Sonakshi Sinha | |
| November | Anushka Sharma | |
| December | Kangana Ranaut | |

=== 2013 ===
| Issue | Cover model | Photographer |
|---|---|---|
| January/February | Priyanka Chopra | |
| March | Katrina Kaif | |
| April | Tabu | |
| May | Sasha Agha | |
| June | Kajol | |
| July/August | Alia Bhatt | |
| September | Sonam Kapoor | |
| October | Saif Ali Khan & Kareena Kapoor | |
| November | Chitrangada Singh | |
| December | Jacqueline Fernandez | |

=== 2014 ===
| Issue | Cover model | Photographer |
|---|---|---|
| January/February | Rasika Navare & Ninja Singh | |
| March | Deepika Padukone | |
| April | Lisa Haydon | |
| May | Kalki Koechlin | |
| June | Lakshmi Menon | |
| July/August | Sonam Kapoor | |
| September | Shraddha Kapoor | |
| October | Tabu | |
| November | Sonakshi Sinha | |
| December | Esha Gupta | |

=== 2015 ===
| Issue | Cover model | Photographer |
|---|---|---|
| January/February | Archana Akhil Kumar | |
| March | Karan Johar & Kareena Kapoor | |
| April | Jacqueline Fernandez | |
| May | Elizabeth Hurley | |
| June | Natasha Poonawala | |
| July | Alia Bhatt | |
| August | Athiya Shetty | |
| September | Sonam Kapoor | |
| October | Shraddha Kapoor | |
| November | Kangana Ranaut | |
| December | Anushka Sharma | |

=== 2016 ===
| Issue | Cover model | Photographer |
|---|---|---|
| January/February | Pooja Mor | Taylor Tupy |
| March | Sonam Kapoor | Suresh Natarajan |
| April | Arjun & Kareena Kapoor | Prasad Naik |
| May | Ketholeno Kense | Tarun Vishwa |
| June | Lisa Haydon | Bikramjit Bose |
| July | Shraddha Kapoor | Nuno Oliveira |
| August | Emilia Clarke | David Slijper |
| September | Priyanka Chopra | Tony Kim |
| October | Cora Emmanuel; Emanuela de Paula; Geena Rocero; Hannelore Knuts; Hind Sahli; Pyper America & Daisy Clementine Smith; Soo Joo Park; Tracey Africa; Tyra Banks | Stockton Johnson |
| November | Aishwarya Rai | Farrokh Chothia |
| December | Bhumika Arora | Nick Hudson |

=== 2017 ===
| Issue | Cover model | Photographer |
|---|---|---|
| January/February | Kanishtha Dhankhar | Nicoline Patricia Malina |
| March | Alia Bhatt | Suresh Natarajan |
| April | Padma Lakshmi | Prasad Naik |
| May | Kajol | Prasad Naik |
| June | Lakshmi Menon | Bikramjit Bose |
| July/August | Disha Patani | Andrea Varani |
| September | Lottie Moss | Lucian Bor |
| October | Indira Varma | Alex Bramall |
| November | Lisa Haydon | Nuno Oliveira |
| December | Urvashi Umrao; Monica Tomas; Natasha Ramachandran | Ace Amir |

=== 2018 ===
| Issue | Cover model | Photographer |
|---|---|---|
| January/February | Neha Kapur & Kunal Nayyar | Tarun Vishwa |
| March | Padma Lakshmi | Mark Seliger |
| April | Aditi Rao Hydari | Porus Vimadalal |
| May | Tahmima Anam; Tishani Doshi; Fatima Bhutto | Norbert Kniat |
| June | Kangana Ranaut | Alan Gelati |
| July/August | Ishaan Khatter & Janhvi Kapoor | Tarun Vishwa |
| September | Anushka Sharma | Alan Gelati |
| October | Katrina Kaif | Errikos Andreou |
| November | | |
| December | | |

== See also ==
- List of Vogue India cover models
