= Siya Malasi =

Indian model and actress

- Occupations: Actress; model

Siya Malasi is an Indian actress and model. She was a contestant in the second season of MTV Supermodel of the Year in 2021. In 2023, she portrayed the character Chandi in the Hindi-language action crime drama Rana Naidu. Later that year, she starred in the debut commercial for Tata Starbucks's #ItStartsWithYourName campaign, which went viral on Facebook and Twitter, receiving over 12 million views and leading some people to call for a boycott of Starbucks.

== Biography ==
In 2021, Malasi was a contestant on the second season of the Indian reality television competition show MTV Supermodel of the Year, where she placed tenth. While competing on the series, she talked openly about coming out as a transgender woman. Malasi continues to work as model, and appeared in a haircare campaign for Tweak India.

As an actress, Malasi has appeared in television series and commercials. In 2023, she played Chandi in the Indian Hindi action crime drama Rana Naidu. In March 2023, Malasi portrayed Arpita, a transgender woman meeting with her parents in a coffee shop, in a Pride Month commercial for Starbucks, which launched the company's campaign titled #ItStartsWithYourName. The commercial went viral and was received over twelve million views on Facebook and Twitter. The campaign caused debate on social media platforms, with some calling for a boycott of Starbucks and other's celebrating the company's LGBTQ inclusivity.
