= Siya Mngoma =

South African footballer

Personal information
- Full name: Siya Mpande Mngoma
- Date of birth: 6 July 1988 (age 38)
- Place of birth: Pretoria, South Africa
- Height: 1.75 m (5 ft 9 in)
- Position: Goalkeeper

Team information
- Current team: AmaZulu F.C.
- Number: 44

Senior career*
| Years | Team | Apps | (Gls) |
| 2007–2008 | Durban Stars | | |
| 2008–2012 | Pretoria University | | |
| 2012–2014 | Golden Arrows | 12 | (0) |
| 2014–2015 | Thanda Royal Zulu | 0 | (0) |
| 2015– | AmaZulu F.C. | 0 | (0) |
- * Club domestic league appearances and goals as of 1 February 2014 ‡ National team caps and goals as of 26 November 2013

Siya Mpande Mngoma (born 6 July 1988) is a South African soccer player who plays for Thanda Royal Zulu as a goalkeeper.

== Club career ==
Mngoma joined Pretoria University in 2008 from Durban Stars. He was captain of the team during the 2011–12 National First Division season as they won the league. Mngoma joined Golden Arrows in July 2012 on a two-year contract and made his debut in a 2–1 victory against Platinum Stars in May 2013.
