= Appearance (law) =

In law, an appearance (from Latin apparere, to appear) occurs when a party to a lawsuit physically appears in court, or to a formal act through which a defendant submits to the jurisdiction of the court in which the lawsuit is pending.

== History ==
Prior to the Woolf Reforms and the introduction of the Civil Procedure Rules, the defendant in an action in the High Court of England entered his appearance to the writ of summons by delivering, either at the central office of the Supreme Court, or a district registry, a written memorandum either giving his solicitor's name or stating that he defends in person. He would also have to give notice to the plaintiff of his appearance, which ought, according to the time limited by the writ, to have been within eight days after service; a defendant could, however, have appeared any time before judgment. The Rules of the Supreme Court, orders xii. and xiii., regulated the procedure with respect to the entering of an appearance, the giving of notice, the limit of time, the setting aside and the general effect of default of appearance.

== Forms ==
An appearance may occur when a party physically appears in a court proceeding, or through the filing of a written document with the court. Failure to appear in a timely manner may result in the entry of a default against the non-appearing party. By default, a party's appearance in a court proceeding is unconditional. The effect is to acknowledge the court's jurisdiction over the party who has made the appearance, and to waive any irregularity in service or commencement of proceedings.

In order to avoid conceding jurisdiction, waiving irregularities, or both, a party may file a conditional appearance. A conditional appearance has two primary forms, the limited appearance, which disputes liability to the limited extent of identified property, and the special appearance, which allows a defendant to dispute the personal jurisdiction of the court over the defendant so as to avoid default while the defendant seeks the dismissal of the action. A conditional appearance may be both conditional and special.

=== Limited appearance ===
A limited appearance is a term used in the United States law of civil procedure to describe a civil defendant's appearance in a quasi in rem action in the court of another state to dispute liability to the limited extent of the value of the property seized by that court. This strategy allows the defendant to dispute only that amount seized, though this amount is less than the total amount in controversy, thus limiting his personal liability. Before the advent of this procedural device, a defendant faced the dilemma of either allowing his property to be seized with no defense and sold at sheriff's sale to partially satisfy the claim against him or, on the other hand, to appear in court to dispute the claim but in the process expose himself to the full in personam jurisdiction of the court and therefore the entire amount in controversy.

=== Special appearance ===
A special appearance is a term used in the American law of civil procedure to describe a civil defendant's appearance in the court of another state solely to dispute the personal jurisdiction of the court over that defendant. Prior to the advent of this procedure, defendants had to either appear in the other state's court to defend the case on the merits, or not show up in court at all, and then mount a collateral attack on any judgment rendered against them, when the plaintiff came to the defendant's state to collect on the judgment. In a legal catch-22, if the defendant appeared solely to contest jurisdiction, the court would then be permitted to assert jurisdiction based on the defendant's presence.

In response to the apparent inequity presented by this situation, most states have passed statutes permitting the defendant to make a special appearance in the courts of the state to contest jurisdiction, without further subjecting themselves to the jurisdiction of the court. The equivalent of such an appearance is possible in U.S. federal courts, for the defendant may make a motion to dismiss for lack of personal jurisdiction.

Beginning in the late 1990s, adherents of the sovereign citizen's movement have attempted to use the special appearance to question the jurisdiction and competence of courts where the point is moot. The most prevalent use of the special appearance is in any criminal court, as special appearances are only recognized in the civil rules of procedure and the civil courts. Thus, the term special appearance has no meaning in the context of a criminal court, as anyone committing, or having been indicted for or charged with committing or otherwise alleged to have committed a criminal offense are de jure within the jurisdiction of the criminal courts, whatever their residence or national citizenship.
