= List of accolades received by My Name Is Khan =

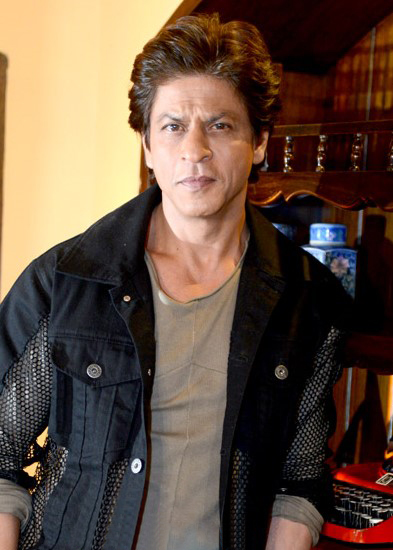
- Shah Rukh Khan (pictured in 2017) received several awards and nominations for his performance in My Name Is Khan.
Accolades
Award	Won	Nominated
BIG Star Entertainment Awards	1	8
Filmfare Awards	3	10
International Indian Film Academy Awards	5	8
Mirchi Music Awards	2	15
Producers Guild Film Awards	1	14
Screen Awards	3	13
Stardust Awards	4	8
Zee Cine Awards	6	8
- Total number of awards and nominations (Note: Awards in certain categories do not have prior nominations and only winners are announced by the jury. For simplification and to avoid errors, each award in this list has been presumed to have had a prior nomination.)
Totals	25	84
- References

My Name Is Khan is a 2010 drama film directed by Karan Johar. The film features Shah Rukh Khan and Kajol in the lead roles with Jimmy Sheirgill, Zarina Wahab, Sonya Jehan, Vinay Pathak and Parvin Dabas playing supporting roles. Set in the United States, the film's story focuses on Rizwan Khan (Khan), a non-resident Indian with Asperger syndrome whose wife, Mandira (Kajol), has a child, Sameer, from a previous relationship. During the aftermath of the September 11 attacks, Sameer dies as a result of a racist assault by school bullies. Mandira blames Sameer's death on Rizwan due to his religion, and tells him not to come back until he can convince the President of the United States that he is not a terrorist. Rizwan takes Mandira's words literally and tries to meet the President so as to win her back. My Name Is Khan was co-produced by Johar's brother, Hiroo Yash Johar, and Khan's wife, Gauri Khan, under the Dharma Productions and Red Chillies Entertainment banners respectively. Shankar–Ehsaan–Loy composed the soundtrack while Niranjan Iyengar and Javed Akhtar wrote the lyrics for its songs. Ravi K. Chandran, Deepa Bhatia and Sharmishta Roy handled the cinematography, editing and production design respectively.

Produced on a budget of ₹850 million (about US$19 million in 2010), (Note: The average exchange rate in 2010 was 45.09 Indian rupees (₹) per 1 US dollar (US$).) My Name Is Khan was released on 12 February 2010 and received positive reviews. It was commercially successful, grossing ₹2.048 billion (about US$45 million in 2010) worldwide. The film won 25 awards from 84 nominations; its direction, story, screenplay, performances of the cast members and music have received the most attention from award groups.

My Name Is Khan led the 56th Filmfare Awards with ten nominations including Best Film (Hiroo Yash Johar, Gauri Khan) and Best Music Director (Shankar–Ehsaan–Loy). It went on to win four including Best Director (Johar), Best Actor (Khan) and Best Actress (Kajol). The film won five awards out of eight nominations at the 12th IIFA Awards, including Best Director (Johar), Best Actor (Khan) and Best Lyricist (Iyengar for "Sajda"). It garnered fourteen nominations at the 6th edition of Producers Guild Film Awards, with Johar winning for Best Director. At the Zee Cine Awards 2011, the film earned six wins out of eight nominations, including those for Best Director (Johar) and Best Actor – Male (Khan). Among other wins, My Name Is Khan received four Stardust Awards, three Screen Awards, two Mirchi Music Awards and a BIG Star Entertainment Award.

== Awards and nominations ==
Award	Date of ceremony (Note: Date is linked to the article about the awards held that year, wherever possible.)	Category	Recipient(s) and nominee(s)	Result	Ref.
BIG Star Entertainment Awards	21 December 2010	Most Entertaining Film	Hiroo Yash Johar, Gauri Khan	Nominated	
BIG Star Entertainment Awards	21 December 2010	Most Entertaining Director	Karan Johar	Nominated	
BIG Star Entertainment Awards	21 December 2010	Most Entertaining Film Actor – Male	Shah Rukh Khan	Nominated	
BIG Star Entertainment Awards	21 December 2010	Most Entertaining Film Actor – Female	Kajol	Nominated	
BIG Star Entertainment Awards	21 December 2010	Most Entertaining Song	"Sajda"	Nominated	
BIG Star Entertainment Awards	21 December 2010	Most Entertaining Singer – Male	Shafqat Amanat Ali for "Tere Naina"	Nominated	
BIG Star Entertainment Awards	21 December 2010	Most Entertaining Singer – Female	Richa Sharma for "Sajda"	Nominated	
BIG Star Entertainment Awards	21 December 2010	Most Entertaining Music	Shankar–Ehsaan–Loy	Won	
Filmfare Awards	29 January 2011	Best Film	Hiroo Yash Johar, Gauri Khan	Nominated	
Filmfare Awards	29 January 2011	Best Director	Karan Johar	Won	
Filmfare Awards	29 January 2011	Best Actor	Shah Rukh Khan	Won	
Filmfare Awards	29 January 2011	Best Actress	Kajol	Won	
Filmfare Awards	29 January 2011	Best Music Director	Shankar–Ehsaan–Loy	Nominated	
Filmfare Awards	29 January 2011	Best Lyricist	Niranjan Iyengar for "Noor-E-Khuda"	Nominated	
Filmfare Awards	29 January 2011	Best Lyricist	Niranjan Iyengar for "Sajda"	Nominated	
Filmfare Awards	29 January 2011	Best Male Playback Singer	Adnan Sami, Shankar Mahadevan for "Noor-E-Khuda"	Nominated	
Filmfare Awards	29 January 2011	Best Male Playback Singer	Rahat Fateh Ali Khan for "Sajda"	Nominated	
Filmfare Awards	29 January 2011	Best Female Playback Singer	Shreya Ghoshal for "Noor-E-Khuda"	Nominated	
International Indian Film Academy Awards	23–25 June 2011	Best Film	Hiroo Yash Johar, Gauri Khan	Nominated	
International Indian Film Academy Awards	23–25 June 2011	Best Director	Karan Johar	Won	
International Indian Film Academy Awards	23–25 June 2011	Best Actor	Shah Rukh Khan	Won	
International Indian Film Academy Awards	23–25 June 2011	Best Lyricist	Niranjan Iyengar for "Sajda"	Won	
International Indian Film Academy Awards	23–25 June 2011	Best Music Director	Shankar–Ehsaan–Loy	Nominated	
International Indian Film Academy Awards	23–25 June 2011	Best Background Score	Shankar–Ehsaan–Loy	Won	
International Indian Film Academy Awards	23–25 June 2011	Best Story	Shibani Bathija	Won	
International Indian Film Academy Awards	23–25 June 2011	Best Screenplay	Shibani Bathija	Nominated	
Mirchi Music Awards	27 January 2011	Best Programmer and Arranger	Shankar–Ehsaan–Loy for "Noor-E-Khuda"	Won	
Mirchi Music Awards	27 January 2011	Best song in Sufi Tradition	"Sajda"	Won	
Mirchi Music Awards	27 January 2011	Best Song of The Year – Listener's Choice	"Sajda"	Nominated	
Mirchi Music Awards	27 January 2011	Best Song of The Year – Listener's Choice	"Tere Naina"	Nominated	
Mirchi Music Awards	27 January 2011	Best Album of The Year – Listener's Choice	My Name Is Khan	Nominated	
Mirchi Music Awards	27 January 2011	Song of The Year	"Sajda"	Nominated	
Mirchi Music Awards	27 January 2011	Song of The Year	"Tere Naina"	Nominated	
Mirchi Music Awards	27 January 2011	Best Album of The Year	My Name Is Khan	Nominated	
Mirchi Music Awards	27 January 2011	Male Vocalist of The Year	Rahat Fateh Ali Khan and Shankar Mahadevan for "Sajdaa"	Nominated	
Mirchi Music Awards	27 January 2011	Female Vocalist of The Year	Richa Sharma for "Sajdaa"	Nominated	
Mirchi Music Awards	27 January 2011	Music Composer of The Year	Shankar-Ehsaan-Loy for "Sajdaa"	Nominated	
Mirchi Music Awards	27 January 2011	Lyricist of The Year	Niranjan Iyengar for "Sajdaa"	Nominated	
Mirchi Music Awards	27 January 2011	Lyricist of The Year	Niranjan Iyengar for "Tere Naina"	Nominated	
Mirchi Music Awards	27 January 2011	Raag-Inspired Song of the Year	"Sajdaa"	Nominated	
Mirchi Music Awards	27 January 2011	Best Background Score of the Year	Shankar-Ehsaan-Loy	Nominated	
Producers Guild Film Awards	12 January 2011	Best Film	Hiroo Yash Johar, Gauri Khan	Nominated	
Producers Guild Film Awards	12 January 2011	Best Director	Karan Johar	Won	
Producers Guild Film Awards	12 January 2011	Best Actor in a Leading Role	Shah Rukh Khan	Nominated	
Producers Guild Film Awards	12 January 2011	Best Actress in a Leading Role	Kajol	Nominated	
Producers Guild Film Awards	12 January 2011	Best Music Director	Shankar–Ehsaan–Loy	Nominated	
Producers Guild Film Awards	12 January 2011	Best Male Playback Singer	Shafqat Amanat Ali for "Tere Naina"	Nominated	
Producers Guild Film Awards	12 January 2011	Best Female Playback Singer	Richa Sharma for "Sajda"	Nominated	
Producers Guild Film Awards	12 January 2011	Best Lyricist	Niranjan Iyengar for "Tere Naina"	Nominated	
Producers Guild Film Awards	12 January 2011	Best Story	Shibani Bathija	Nominated	
Producers Guild Film Awards	12 January 2011	Best Editing	Deepa Bhatia	Nominated	
Producers Guild Film Awards	12 January 2011	Best Cinematography	Ravi K. Chandran	Nominated	
Producers Guild Film Awards	12 January 2011	Best Sound Recording	Dileep Subramanium	Nominated	
Producers Guild Film Awards	12 January 2011	Best Special Effects	Red Chillies VFX	Nominated	
Producers Guild Film Awards	12 January 2011	Best Re-Recording	Anuj Mathur	Nominated	
Screen Awards	6 January 2011	Best Actor	Shah Rukh Khan	Nominated	
Screen Awards	6 January 2011	Best Actress	Kajol	Nominated	
Screen Awards	6 January 2011	Best Music Director	Shankar–Ehsaan–Loy	Won	
Screen Awards	6 January 2011	Best Background Music	Shankar–Ehsaan–Loy	Nominated	
Screen Awards	6 January 2011	Best Male Playback	Adnan Sami, Shankar Mahadevan for "Noor-E-Khuda"	Nominated	
Screen Awards	6 January 2011	Best Male Playback	Rahat Fateh Ali Khan for "Sajda"	Nominated	
Screen Awards	6 January 2011	Best Male Playback	Shafqat Amanat Ali for "Tere Naina"	Nominated	
Screen Awards	6 January 2011	Best Female Playback	Shreya Ghoshal for "Noor-E-Khuda"	Nominated	
Screen Awards	6 January 2011	Best Lyricist	Niranjan Iyengar for "Noor-E-Khuda"	Nominated	
Screen Awards	6 January 2011	Best Lyricist	Niranjan Iyengar for "Sajda"	Nominated	
Screen Awards	6 January 2011	Best Story	Shibani Bathija	Nominated	
Screen Awards	6 January 2011	Best Actor (Popular Choice)	Shah Rukh Khan	Won	
Screen Awards	6 January 2011	Ramnath Goenka Memorial Awards	My Name Is Khan	Won	
Stardust Awards	6 February 2011	Best Film – Drama	Hiroo Yash Johar, Gauri Khan	Won	
Stardust Awards	6 February 2011	Best Film of the Year	My Name Is Khan	Nominated	
Stardust Awards	6 February 2011	Best Director – Drama	Karan Johar	Won	
Stardust Awards	6 February 2011	Best Dream Director	Karan Johar	Won	
Stardust Awards	6 February 2011	Best Actor in a Drama	Shah Rukh Khan	Nominated	
Stardust Awards	6 February 2011	Best Actress in a Drama	Kajol	Nominated	
Stardust Awards	6 February 2011	Star of the Year – Female	Kajol	Won	
Stardust Awards	6 February 2011	Best Actress In An Ensemble Cast	Zarina Wahab	Nominated	
Zee Cine Awards	14 January 2011	Best Film	Hiroo Yash Johar, Gauri Khan	Nominated	
Zee Cine Awards	14 January 2011	Best Director	Karan Johar	Won	
Zee Cine Awards	14 January 2011	Best Actor – Male	Shah Rukh Khan	Won	
Zee Cine Awards	14 January 2011	Best Actor – Female	Kajol	Nominated	
Zee Cine Awards	14 January 2011	Best Playback Singer – Female	Richa Sharma for "Sajda"	Won	
Zee Cine Awards	14 January 2011	Best Story	Shibani Bathija	Won	
Zee Cine Awards	14 January 2011	Best Sound Design	Dileep Subramanium	Won	
Zee Cine Awards	14 January 2011	Best Marketed Film	My Name Is Khan	Won	
