= List of Vogue India cover models =

This list of Vogue India cover models (2007–present) is a catalog of cover models who have appeared on the cover of Vogue India, the Indian edition of American fashion magazine Vogue.

== 2000s ==
=== 2007 ===
Issue	Cover model	Photographer
October	Bipasha Basu; Gemma Ward; Priyanka Chopra; Monikangana Dutta; Preity Zinta; Lakshmi Menon	Patrick Demarchelier
November	Deepika Padukone	Paolo Roversi
December	Neha Kapur; Tamara Moss; Sheetal Mallar; Krishna Somani; Indrani Dasgupta; Delfine Bafort; Michelle Innes; Tinu Verghese; Sapna Kumar; Bhawna Sharma; Camila Finn; Lakshmi Rana; Carol Gracias	Farrokh Chotthia

=== 2008 ===
Issue	Cover model	Photographer
January	Gauri Khan	Chris Craymer
February	Katrina Kaif	Atul Kasbekar
March	Kareena Kapoor	Suresh Natarajan
April	Lakshmi Menon	Prabuddha Dasgupta
May	Bipasha Basu	Pascal Chevallier
June	Preity Zinta	Farrokh Chothia
July	Asin	Atul Kasbekar
August	Shweta Salve; Shilpa Agnihotri; Sanjeeda Sheikh	Farrokh Chothia
September	Priyanka Chopra	
October	Aishwarya Rai	Farrokh Chothia
November	Victoria Beckham	Karen Collins
December	Katrina Kaif	Jason Bell

=== 2009 ===
Issue	Cover model	Photographer
January	Tabu	Prasad Naik
February	Jennifer Aniston	Craig McDean
March	Freida Pinto	Regan Cameron
April	Michelle Obama	Annie Leibovitz
May	Lakshmi Menon	Jean François Campos
June	Shilpa Shetty	
July	Deepika Padukone	Bharat Sikka
August	Feroze Gujral; Ujjwala Raut; Jyothsna Chakravarthy; Shobhaa De	Farrokh Chothia
September	Gisele Bündchen	Patrick Demarchelier
October	Kajol; Shah Rukh Khan	Atul Kasbekar
November	Katrina Kaif	Prasad Naik
December	Kareena Kapoor	Prasad Naik

== 2010s ==
=== 2010 ===
Issue	Cover model	Photographer
January	Sonam Kapoor	Suresh Natarajan
February	Sarah Jessica Parker	Patrick Demarchelier
March	Lara Dutta	Marcin Tyszka
April	Gia Johnson; Nethra Raghuraman; Tinu Verghis; Ashika Pratt; Esha Gupta	Prabuddha Dasgupta
May	Deepika Padukone	Atul Kasbekar
June	Jacqueline Fernandez	Prasad Naik
July	Abhishek Bachchan; Aishwarya Rai	Marcin Tyszka
August	Cameron Diaz	Regan Cameron
September	Bipasha Basu	Suresh Natarajan
October	Cindy Crawford	Mark Seliger
November	Priyanka Chopra	Prasad Naik
December	Genelia D'Souza	Slava Filippov

=== 2011 ===
Issue	Cover model	Photographer
January	Padma Lakshmi	Prabuddha Dasgupta
February	Aishwarya Rai	Marcin Tyszka
March	Deepika Padukone	Prasad Naik
April	Ashika Pratt	Tejal Patni
May	Katrina Kaif	Marc Hom
June	Rihanna	Annie Leibovitz
July	Sonakshi Sinha	Suresh Natarajan
August	Madhuri Dixit	Prasad Naik
September	Nargis Fakhri	Fabio Chizzola
October	Isabeli Fontana; Ranbir Kapoor	Marc Hom
November	Sonam Kapoor	Bruno Dayan
December	Priyanka Chopra	Bruno Dayan

=== 2012 ===
Issue	Cover model	Photographer
January	Mehr Jesia	Prabuddha Dasgupta
February	Anushka Sharma	Bharat Sikka
March	Ashika Pratt; Alyssah Ali; Jessica Clark	Marcin Tyszka
April	Gauri Khan; Sussanne Khan	Tarun Vishwa
May	Chitrangada Singh	Luis Monteiro
June	Deepika Padukone	James Meakin
July	Diana Penty	Luis Monteiro
August	Kajol	Mark Pillai
September	Alia Bhatt	Luis Monteiro
October	Anushka Sharma; Deepika Padukone; Katrina Kaif; Priyanka Chopra; Sonam Kapoor	Suresh Natarajan
November	Shweta Nanda	R Burman
December	Kalki Koechlin	Tarun Vishwa

=== 2013 ===
Issue	Cover model	Photographer
January	Vidya Balan	Prasad Naik
February	Kareena Kapoor	Abhay Singh
March	Priyanka Chopra	Tarun Vishwa
April	Esha Gupta	Nat Prakobsantisuk
May	Beyoncé	Patrick Demarchelier
June	Sonam Kapoor	Marcin Tyszka
July	Anushka Sharma	Suresh Natarajan
August	Sridevi	Suresh Natarajan
September	Deepika Padukone	Prasad Naik
October	Freida Pinto	Bharat Sikka
November	Ayushmann Khurrana; Parineeti Chopra; Sushant Singh Rajput; Alia Bhatt; Arjun Kapoor	Suresh Natarajan
December	Katrina Kaif	Signe Vilstrup

=== 2014 ===
Issue	Cover model	Photographer
January	Kangana Ranaut	Signe Vilstrup
February	Parineeti Chopra	R Burman
March	Kareena Kapoor	Dirk Bader
April	Shraddha Kapoor	Tejal Patni
May	Ashika Pratt	Mazen Abusrour
June	Deepika Padukone	Prasad Naik
July	Alia Bhatt	Mazen Abusrour
August	Twinkle Khanna	Errikos Andreou
September	Sonam Kapoor	Signe Vilstrup
October	Karan Johar; Deepika Padukone; Kangana Ranaut; Aamir Khan; Ranbir Kapoor; Alia Bhatt; Barkha Dutt; Yuvraj Singh; Sudha Murthy; Ranveer Singh; Tanya Dubash; A. R. Rahman	Farrokh Chothia
November	Lisa Haydon	Tarun Vishwa
December	Katrina Kaif	Prasad Naik

=== 2015 ===
Issue	Cover model	Photographer
January	Anushka Sharma	Marcin Tyszka
February	Blake Lively	Mario Testino
March	Aishwarya Rai	Marc Hom
April	Sonam Kapoor	Kristian Schuller
May	Sonakshi Sinha	Ellen von Unwerth
June	Kangana Ranaut	R Burman
July	Jacqueline Fernandez	Signe Vilstrup
August	Rani Mukerji	Signe Vilstrup
September	Katrina Kaif	Signe Vilstrup
October	Ranveer Singh; Deepika Padukone	Tarun Vishwa
November	Shanina Shaik; Shah Rukh Khan	Mazen Abusrour
December	Kajol; Kareena Kapoor; Karisma Kapoor; Alia Bhatt; Sridevi	Tarun Vishwa

=== 2016 ===
Issue	Cover model	Photographer
January	Sonam Kapoor	Atul Kasbekar
February	Bhumika Arora	Ruvén Afanador
March	Alia Bhatt; Sidharth Malhotra	Luis Monteiro
April	Priyanka Chopra	Chris Craymer
May	Anushka Sharma	Errikos Andreou
June	Katrina Kaif	Luis Monteiro
July	Kareena Kapoor	Richard Ramos
August	Kaia Gerber; Cindy Crawford	Mario Testino
September	Ketholeno Kense; Ranbir Kapoor; Gizele Oliveira	Ram Shergill
October	Pooja Mor; Varsha Thapa; Peya Jannatul; Shenelle Rodrigo; Raudha Athif; Deki Wangmo	Bharat Sikka
November	Deepika Padukone	Tarun Vishwa
December	Vaani Kapoor	Richard Ramos

=== 2017 ===
Issue	Cover model	Photographer
January	Hrithik Roshan; Lisa Haydon	Errikos Andreou
February	Alia Bhatt	Greg Swales
March	Anushka Sharma	Tarun Vishwa
April	Kriti Sanon	Luis Monteiro
May	Kendall Jenner	Mario Testino
June	Sonam Kapoor	Signe Vilstrup
July	Arjun Kapoor; Athiya Shetty	Thomas Whiteside
August	Shweta Bachchan; Jaya Bachchan; Navya Naveli Nanda	Tarun Vishwa
September	Priyanka Chopra	An Le
October	Twinkle Khanna; Sonam Kapoor; Anushka Sharma; Karan Johar	Greg Swales
October	Padma Lakshmi; Priyanka Chopra; Natalia Vodianova	Mark Seliger
October	Mithali Raj; Shah Rukh Khan; Nita Ambani	Greg Swales
November	Sonam Kapoor	Greg Swales
December	Salman Khan; Katrina Kaif	Signe Vilstrup

=== 2018 ===
Issue	Cover model	Photographer
January	Kareena Kapoor	Errikos Andreou
February	Deepika Padukone	Mazen Abusrour
March	Kim Kardashian	Greg Swales
April	Aishwarya Rai; Pharrell Williams	Greg Swales
May	Aditi Rao Hydari	Errikos Andreou
June	Janhvi Kapoor	Prasad Naik
July	Sonam Kapoor; Anand Ahuja	Signe Vilstrup
August	Suhana Khan	Errikos Andreou
September	Radhika Nair; Saffron Vadher	Greg Swales
October	Ranveer Singh; Sara Sampaio	Greg Swales
November	Alia Bhatt; Arianna Huffington; Faye D'Souza; Hima Das; Kareena Kapoor; Maria Grazia Chiuri; Radhika Apte; Ranbir Kapoor	Bikramjit Bose
December	Katrina Kaif	Greg Swales

=== 2019 ===
Issue	Cover model	Photographer
January	Priyanka Chopra	Annie Leibovitz
February	Isha Ambani	Tarun Vishwa
March	Anushka Sharma	Georges Antoni
April	Sara Ali Khan	Tarun Vishwa
May	Padma Lakshmi	Kristian Schuller
June	Diljit Dosanjh; Kareena Kapoor Khan; Natasha Poonawalla; Karan Johar	Marcin Tyszka
July	Aditya Roy Kapur; Sushmita Pathak; Vicky Kaushal; Pooja Mor	Tarun Vishwa
August	Deepika Padukone	Greg Swales
September	Priyanka Chopra	Marcin Kempski
October	Dulquer Salmaan; Mahesh Babu; Nayanthara	Nuno Oliveira
November	Alia Bhatt	Sumer Verma
November	Anushka Sharma; Ranveer Singh	Tarun Vishwa
November	Dutee Chand	Ashish Shah
November	Huda Kattan	Mazen Abusrour
November	Katrina Kaif; Lilly Singh	Greg Swales
December	Kiara Advani	Tarun Vishwa

== 2020s ==
=== 2020 ===
Issue	Cover model	Photographer/Artist
January	Katy Perry	Greg Swales
February	Saina Nehwal	Francesco Scotti
March	Winnie Harlow	Billy Kidd
April	Kareena Kapoor Khan	Tarun Vishwa
May	Jhumpa Lahiri	Bikramjit Bose
June	—N/a	Takashi Murakami
July	Anushka Sharma	Billy Kidd
August	Hailey Bieber	Zoey Grossman
September	Norah Jones	Kat Irlin
October	Amrit	Boo George
November	Gita Gopinath	John Huet
December	Mindy Kaling	Mike Rosenthal

=== 2021 ===
Issue	Cover model	Photographer
January	Anushka Sharma	Rid Burman
February	Haima Simoes; Shruti Venkatesh	Bikrajmit Bose
March	Malavika Mohanan	Ashish Shah
April	Ananya Birla	Alexi Lubomirski
May/June	Taapsee Pannu	Bikrajmit Bose
July	Sonam Kapoor Ahuja	Mariano Vivanco
August	Salma Hayek	Jackie Nickerson
September	Priyanka Chopra	Sølve Sundsbø
October	P. V. Sindhu; Mirabai Chanu; Lovlina Borgohain	Rid Burman
November	Nidhi Sunil	Bikrajmit Bose
December	Natasha Poonawalla	Cruz Valdez

=== 2022 ===
Issue	Cover model	Photographer
January	Zinnia Kumar	Daniel Jackson
February	Sobhita Dhulipala	Martin Mae
March	Lakshmi Menon	Ashish Shah
April	Lilly Singh	Nick Sethi
May	Deepika Padukone	Vivek Vadoliya
June/July	Amrit	Ashish Shah
August	Anoushka Virk; Kiran Varghese; Sarju Langpoklakpam; Zain Ali; Anjaij Lama; Glorious Luna; Dame Infala; Shantanu Dhope; Mayuri Pujari	Kalpesh Lathigra
September	Sonam Kapoor	Ben Weller
October	Ashley Radjarame	Nick Sethi
November	Tabu; Kareena Kapoor Khan; Kriti Sanon	James Tolich
December	Smriti Mandhana	Bikramjit Bose

=== 2023 ===
Issue	Cover model	Photographer
January/February	Avanti Nagrath	Nick Sethi
March/April	Naomi Campbell	Campbell Addy
May/June	Alia Bhatt	Vivek Vadoliya
July/August	Zeenat Aman	Avani Rai
September/October	The Archies	Bowen Aricò
November/December	Deepika Padukone	James Tolich

=== 2024 ===
Issue	Cover model	Photographer
January/February	Madhu Sapre; Mehr Jesia; Anugraha Natarajan; Nayonikaa Shetty	Bikramjit Bose
March/April	Triptii Dimri	Ashish Shah
May/June	Simone Ashley	Rid Burman
July/August	Isha Ambani Piramal	Micaiah Carter
September/October	Priyanka Chopra	Zhong Lin
November/December	Dimple Kapadia	Ashish Shah

=== 2025 ===
Issue	Cover model	Photographer
January/February	Anupama Parameswaran	Akula Madhu
March/April	Ananya Panday	Delali Ayivi
May/June	Sonam Kapoor	Ashish Shah
July/August	Lisa Haydon	Tenzing Dakpa
September/October	Padma Lakshmi; Krishna Lakshmi	Jingyu Lin
November/December	Maitreyi Ramakrishnan	Rebekah Campbell

=== 2026 ===
Issue	Cover model	Photographer
January/February	Kiara Advani	Yung Hua Chen
March/April	Samantha Ruth Prabhu	Bikramjit Bose
May/June	Smriti Mandhana	Bhumika Sharma
July/August	Gauravi Kumari; Padmanabh Singh	Zantz Han
September/October	Mika Abdalla	Agata Serge
November/December	Katrina Kaif	Tarun Vishwa
