= Stardust Award for Best Director – Comedy or Romance =

Indian film award

The Stardust Best Comedy/Romance Director is chosen by the readers of the annual Stardust magazine. The award honours a star that has made an impact with their acting in that certain film.

Here is a list of the award winners and the films for which they won.

| Year | Director | Film |
|---|---|---|
| 2011 | Rohit Shetty | Golmaal 3 |

== See also ==
- Stardust Awards
- Bollywood
- Cinema of India
