= Stardust Award for Best Film – Comedy or Romance =

Film award in India

The Stardust Best Comedy/Romance Film is chosen by the readers of the annual Stardust magazine. The award honours a star that has made an impact with their acting in that certain film.

Here is a list of the award winners and the films for which they won.

Year	Film	Producer/Production
2010	All The Best: Fun Begins	Ajay Devgn Films
2011	Housefull	Sajid Nadiadwala
2018	Guest Iin London	Ashwni Dhir

== See also ==
- Stardust Awards
- Bollywood
- Cinema of India
