= Gauri Khan =

Indian film producer and interior designer (born 1970)

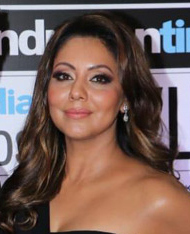
- Khan in 2019
- Born: Gauri Chhibber; 8 October 1970 (age 56); New Delhi, Delhi, India
- Education: Lady Shri Ram College, New Delhi
- Organisations: Red Chillies Entertainment; Gauri Khan Designs; Torii Restaurant
- Spouse: Shah Rukh Khan (m. 1991)
- Children: 3 (including Aryan and Suhana )

Gauri Khan (Note: According to the latter's business filings obtained from the Ministry of Corporate Affairs, her legal name is Gauri Shahrukh Khan. Wikipedia uses legal name for introduction.) (born 8 October 1970) is an Indian film producer and Interior designer. She has produced several Hindi films, including Main Hoon Na, Om Shanti Om, Ra.One, and Chennai Express, through Red Chillies Entertainment, a company she co-founded with actor-husband Shah Rukh Khan in 2001.

In 2013, Khan launched Gauri Khan Designs, an interior design studio that has completed projects for several residential and commercial clients, including public figures. She opened an "Experience Centre" in Delhi in 2025 to showcase design work. Media reports note that her design fees for residential projects range from ₹30 lakh to over ₹5 crore. In 2018, Khan was included in Fortune magazine's "50 Most Powerful Women".

== Early life ==
Gauri Chhibber was born in Delhi to Punjabi Hindu family of Savita and Colonel Ramesh Chandra Chibber who belong to Hoshiarpur. She was raised in the suburbs of Panchsheel Park, Delhi. She completed her schooling at Loreto Convent School, completed high school at Modern School Vasant Vihar, New Delhi, and graduated from Lady Shri Ram College with a B.A. (Hons.) in History. She also completed a six-month course in fashion design from the National Institute of Fashion Technology and learned tailoring due to her father's garment business.

== Career ==
In 2002, Gauri Khan and her husband Shah Rukh Khan established the film production and distribution company Red Chillies Entertainment. It was transformed from the now defunct Dreamz Unlimited which the couple first established in 1999. She serves as co-chairperson and the main producer of all the films produced under the banner. The first film she produced was Farah Khan's directorial debut Main Hoon Na. The film performed well at the box office, becoming the second highest-grossing film of the year. She also made a guest appearance in one of the films she has produced Om Shanti Om (2007).

She is managed by Bottomline Media, and close confidante and friend named Tanaaz Bhatia from NYC. Khan also designed a fashion collection titled 'Cocktails and Dreams' for Satya Paul in 2016.

Gauri first expressed interest in interior design as a hobby while renovating her Bandra bungalow, Mannat at Siraj Dokadia Road. The bungalow is a tourist spot and a heritage building deemed important to the townscape and hence exempt from demolition. However, in 2010, she professionally ventured into interior designing in partnership with interior designer and close friend Sussanne Khan to design exclusive interior projects together. The same year, they collaborated on their first commercial project together in Vadodara. In 2011, Gauri partnered with Sussanne again to launch and introduce The Charcoal Project foundation in Mumbai.

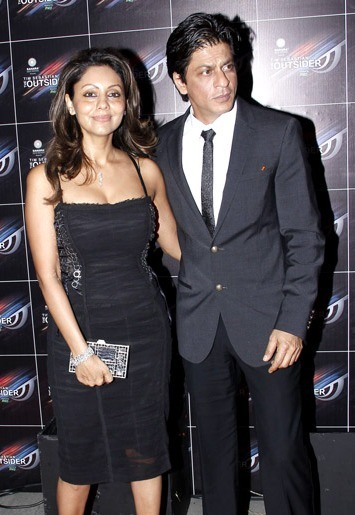
Khan with her husband Shah Rukh Khan in 2012

Gauri launched her first concept store called The Design Cell located in Worli, Mumbai in early 2014. The store showcases furniture designed by Gauri herself as well as various other Indian designers. In 2016, Gauri was invited to show her designs at the prestigious Maison et Objet show in Paris.

In August 2017, Gauri launched her design studio, "Gauri Khan Designs" that spans over 8,700 sq ft (810 m^{2}) in Juhu, Mumbai. Khan has collaborated with various international artists including Roberto Cavalli and Ralph Lauren for home accessories. In a 2017 interview with Vogue India, she spoke about her project, and said "It's been an exciting experience, seeing it all come together. I've been influenced by my travels across India and the globe. I take a keen interest in the architecture of places when I travel." For her work in the field of interior design, Gauri was awarded with the Excellence in Design Award at the Hello! Hall of Fame Awards in 2018.

In 2017, Gauri Khan curated a collection of designer lights for TISVA, a premium home decorative lighting brand from Usha International Limited which introduced smart-control magnetic systems—launched for the first time in India. Khan has also collaborated with Emanate Home on lighting design.

=== In the media ===
Gauri Khan is known for keeping a low profile and being media shy, though she is often cited as one of the most stylish women in Bollywood. She appeared on the cover of page of the popular Indian lifestyle magazine, Vogue India in January 2008. The photos were taken by the well-known British lifestyle photographer Chris Craymer. The magazine called her the "First Lady of Bollywood". She appeared again on the cover page of Vogue India along with Sussanne Khan in April 2012. She also walked the ramp alongside her husband for filmmaker turned fashion designer Karan Johar at the HDIL India Couture Week 2009.

In 2008, she appeared in a television and print commercial for the home furnishings brand, D'decor along with her husband. The couple play themselves in the commercial.

== Personal life ==
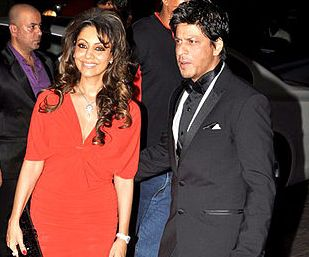
Khan with her husband Shah Rukh Khan at Karan Johar's 40th birthday bash at Taj Lands End

Gauri first met Shah Rukh Khan in 1984 in Delhi, before the start of his successful career in Bollywood. The couple married on 25 October 1991, in a traditional Hindu wedding ceremony.

They have a son Aryan (born 1997) and a daughter Suhana (born 2000). In 2013, they became parents of a third child, a son named AbRam, who was born through a surrogate mother. According to Shah Rukh Khan, while he believes in the religion of Islam, he respects his wife's religion greatly. Their children follow both religions; at home the Qur'an is situated next to the Hindu deities.

In 2024, Gauri Khan re-opened Torii, a luxury pan-Asian restaurant in Bandra, Mumbai, applying her interior design to high-end dining.

== Filmography ==
=== As producer ===
Year	Film	Notes
2004	Main Hoon Na	Co-produced with Venus Movies; Nominated — Filmfare Award for Best Film
2005	Paheli	
2005	The Outer World of Shah Rukh Khan	Produced under Red Chillies International Direct-to-video
2007	Om Shanti Om	Also cameo appearance in the end credits Nominated – Filmfare Award for Best Film
2009	Billu	
2010	My Name Is Khan	Co-produced with Dharma Productions and Fox Star Studios
2012	Student of the Year	Co-produced with Dharma Productions
2013	Chennai Express	Co-produced with UTV Motion Pictures; Nominated – Filmfare Award for Best Film
2014	Happy New Year	Also cameo appearance in the end credits
2015	Dilwale	Co-produced with Rohit Shetty Productions
2016	Dear Zindagi	Co-produced with Dharma Productions and Hope Productions
2017	Raees	Co-produced with Excel Entertainment
2017	Jab Harry Met Sejal	
2017	Ittefaq	Co-produced with Dharma Productions and B. R. Studios
2018	Zero	Co-produced with Colour Yellow Productions
2019	Badla	Co-produced with Azure Entertainment
2019	Bard of Blood	
2020	Class of '83	
2020	Betaal	Co-produced with SK Global Entertainment
2020	Kaamyaab	Co-produced with Drishyam Films
2021	Bob Biswas	Co-produced with Bound Script Production
2022	Love Hostel	Co-produced with Drishyam Films
2022	Darlings	Co-produced with Eternal Sunshine Productions
2023	Jawan	
2023	Dunki	Co-produced with Rajkumar Hirani Films and Jio Studios
2025	The Ba***ds of Bollywood	Co-produced with Netflix
2026	Kartavya	Co-produced with Netflix
2026	King †	Co-produced with Marflix Pictures

=== Television ===
Year	Title	Role	Notes
2020–present	Fabulous Lives of Bollywood Wives	Herself	Guest appearance
