= Stardust Award for Best Film – Drama =

Indian film award

The Stardust Award for Best Drama Film is an Indian film award chosen by the readers of the annual Stardust magazine. The award honours a star that has made an impact with their acting in that certain film.

== Winners ==
Year	Film	Producer/Production
2011	My Name is Khan	Dharma Productions; Red Chillies Entertainment
2018	Tubelight	Salman Khan Films

== See also ==
- Stardust Awards
- Bollywood
- Cinema of India
