= Delhi Gang Rape Photo Shoot =

2014 Indian photo shoot by Raj Shetye

A gang rape editorial photo shoot by Raj Shetye called 'The Wrong Turn' featuring model Pooja Mor reminiscent of the Delhi Gang Rape caused international outrage due to its insensitivity worldwide in 2014.

The parents of the gang rape victim dubbed Nirbhaya described the incident as "he...has mocked a girl's struggle. He has no right to play with anyone's sentiments." and "they should be ashamed of it.... he should be punished... the photo shoot should be banned."

National Commission for Women called for strict action against the photo shoot, Congress MP from Bihar Ranjeet Ranjan described the incident as disgusting and said she had given a notice in the Lok Sabha for discussion on the issue. Activist Abha Singh condemned the act saying it was "not only a national shame but also legally a crime."
