= Ambareesh Murty =

Indian entrepreneur and business executive (1971/1972–2023)

- Born: Ambareesh Vedantam Murty; 1971 or 1972
- Died: 7 August 2023 (aged 51); Leh, Ladakh, India
- Education: Delhi College of Engineering; Indian Institute of Management, Calcutta
- Occupations: Co-founder & CEO of Pepperfry
- Known for: Pepperfry; eBay; Cadbury; Internet and Mobile Association of India (IAMAI)

Ambareesh Vedantam Murty (1971 or 1972 – 7 August 2023) was an Indian entrepreneur and business executive. He was the co-founder and CEO of the e-commerce furniture and home goods company Pepperfry, which he co-founded with Ashish Shah in 2012. Before founding Pepperfry, Murty was a country manager at eBay for India.

== Biography ==
Ambareesh Murty held a B.E. from the Delhi College of Engineering and an MBA from the Indian Institute of Management, Calcutta. Murty's entrepreneurship began before entering IIM when he home-tutored students of Class XI and XII in Physics and Math. He set up a small business called Tutors' Bureau that connected talented tutors with school students. He ran the venture for two years in the early 1990s.

Murty began his corporate career as a management trainee with Cadbury India in 1996. He spent the next five years in the company's marketing division rising to the position of brand manager and worked at Cadbury's Delhi, Rajasthan, and Mumbai offices until 2001. In the next few years, he worked in several industry verticals holding leadership positions such as VP (Marketing) with ICICI Prudential AMC, and as brand leader at Levi Strauss India.

In 2003, he left Levi Strauss' Bengaluru office to start Origin Resource, a financial training venture for asset management. However, he returned to corporate life in 2005 joining Britannia as a marketing manager. In March 2008, he became the country head of eBay India. During his tenure with eBay, he also served as the vice chairman of the Internet and Mobile Association of India (IAMAI). While exploring the potential of the e-commerce market in India at eBay, Murty met future Pepperfry partner and co-founder Ashish Shah. Murty left eBay in 2011.

Murty founded Pepperfry along with Ashish Shah in 2012 in Mumbai. Headquartered in Mumbai, Maharashtra, Pepperfry is worth $500 million, with a $244 million investment over eight funding rounds, as of 2020. Among its investors are Goldman Sachs, and Bertelsmann India Investments.

Murty died from cardiac arrest on 7 August 2023 at age 51.
