= Pooja Mor =

Indian fashion model (born 1991)

- Born: 6 November 1991 (age 35); Uttar Pradesh, India
- Occupation: Model
- Years active: 2013 - present
- Modeling information
- Height: 1.75 m (5 ft 9 in)
- Hair color: Brown
- Eye color: Brown
- Agency: Elite Model Management (New York, Los Angeles); VIVA Model Management (Paris, London); Special Management (Milan); Amina Creative Management (Mumbai)

Pooja Mor is an Indian fashion model . Mor debuted at Louis Vuitton's Cruise 2016 runway show in Palm Springs in 2015.

== Career ==
Whilst at university, Pooja Mor won the Ahmedabad regional finals for the Clean & Clear Ahmedabad Times Fresh Face in 2012. After her studies she left Gujarat and told her parents she was going on vacation, instead went to Delhi to try fashion modelling. During this time she entered her second beauty pageant, Indian Princess 2013 and represented her city of Ahmedabad. Pooja Mor went unplaced at Indian Princess International & Indian Princess which was won by Jannatul Ferdoush Peya & Sharan Fernandes. Pooja Mor and Jannatul Ferdous Peya crossed paths again after Indian Princess 2013, both women sharing the October 2016 Vogue India cover.

Working as a freelance model in Delhi, Mor was featured in the November issue of Femina India in 2013. She was later contacted and signed by her current Indian mother agency, Anima Creative Management. Whilst working in India, another model with Elite Model Management took a photo of Pooja and posted it on Instagram, from there came interest from Elite who signed her in 2015.

In Spring/Summer 2016, Mor walked for Givenchy in New York. Mor's catwalk fall went viral across the web. In 2016, Mor relocated to New York City to pursue further opportunities.

As a fashion model, Mor has walked for Stella McCartney, Roberto Cavalli, Louis Vuitton, Givenchy, Alexander McQueen (fashion house), JW Anderson, Dolce & Gabbana, Prabal Gurung, Altuzarra, Elie Saab and Topshop. Mor has appeared on covers of Vogue Italia, Vogue Arabia, Vogue India, Numéro China, Simon, Verve and Harper's Bazaar India. .

Mor became embroiled in controversy in 2014, when she was depicted as part of the Delhi Gang Rape photoshoot, titled ‘The Wrong Turn’ which went viral on the internet for glamorising the gang rape and subsequent 2012 Delhi gang rape and murder.
