= Chris Craymer =

British lifestyle photographer

Chris Craymer is a British lifestyle photographer who also specializes in fashion, beauty, and portrait photography. He has had a number of books published.

== Photography ==
Craymer's work consists of fashion, beauty, romance, and celebrity portraits for commercial and editorial use. He specializes in beauty, fashion, and interiors.

His work has appeared in editorials in Vogue Britain, Vanity Fair Italia, Condé Nast Traveler, and Harper's Bazaar and Queen. He has shot advertising campaigns for Clarins, Clean and Clear, Dove, Neutrogena, and Ligne Roset.

In March 2009, Craymer published his photo book Romance, which consists of a collection of images of real-life couples. He enlisted the help of real life couples who had a strong sense of personal style and individuality. The Mulberry store hosted events in New York City, London, and Hong Kong on the occasion of the release of the book.

== Publications ==
- The Kiss. Quadrille, 2005. ISBN 978-1844002177.
- Romance. Bene Factum, 2009. ISBN 978-1903071205.
- In London. Bene Factum, 2012. ISBN 978-1903071366.
- From the Heart. Damiani, 2016. ISBN 978-8862084529.
- American Romance. Damiani, 2018. ISBN 978-8862085847.
