= Stardust Award for Best Director – Drama =

The Stardust Best Drama Director is chosen by the readers of the annual Stardust magazine. Here is a list of the award winners and the films for which they won.

Year	Director	Film
2010
2009
2008

== See also ==
- Stardust Awards
- Bollywood
- Cinema of India
