= Ashika Pratt =

New Zealand model

- Born: Ashika Jane Kiran Pratt; New Zealand
- Occupation: Model
- Years active: 2005–-present
- Modelling information
- Height: 5 ft 9 in (1.75 m)
- Hair colour: Brown
- Eye colour: Brown
- Agency: HEROES Model Management (New York); Premium Models (Paris); 62 Models & Talent (Auckland); TFM BERLIN (Berlin); Amina Creative Management (Mumbai); TFM (Oslo); Chadwick Models (Sydney)
- Website: https://www.instagram.com/ashika_pratt/

Ashika Pratt is a New Zealand fashion model born to an Indian-Fijian mother and an English father. She is best known for her appearance in the 2010 Kingfisher Calendar and her April 2010 Indian Vogue Cover.

== Modelling ==
At age 15, she was scouted by a pageant scout. Pratt entered the Miss and Mr Howick pageant where she was second runner-up. After competing in a beauty pageant, she decided it wasn't for her. Through that experience, she met her current modeling agent at Nova Models. Her first job was a television commercial for Glassons, a clothing retailer in New Zealand. That same year Pratt made her runway debut. With Nova Models, she landed the covers of Yourself and Her Magazine. She also landed endorsements such as Mitsubishi.

Capitalizing on her Indian ethnicity, Pratt signed with Anima Creatives. Since then, Pratt has appeared on the cover of Indian Vogue and Femina. She has appeared in editorials for Elle, Harpers Bazaar, Marie Claire, Vogue, and Femina. Pratt was also chosen to be a part of the 2010 Kingfisher Calendar. Additionally, she has taken part of Lakme Fashion Week.

In 2010, she was named one of Elle Magazine's Sexiest Models. Also, Pratt was named in Vogue's Fashion Power List 2010. Vogue said, "She is the hottest new face in town. This New Zealand born-and-raised beauty is part-girl-next-door and part-temptress. As far as we're concerned that's a winning combination on any continent."

In 2011, Pratt was featured on the cover of Vogue India April, shot in South Africa. It was a special travel issue and sold out.
