= Pepperfry =

Indian furniture company

- Type: Public
- Industry: Home & Furniture; Omni-channel Retailing
- Founded: July 2011
- Headquarters: Mumbai, India
- Area served: India
- Key people: Ashish Shah (co-founder & CEO); Ambareesh Murty (co-founder; Sanjay Netrabile (CTO)
- Products: Furniture, home décor
- Revenue: ▲224.5 Cr (2022); ▲98 Cr (2016)
- Operating income: ▲ Rs 247.0 Cr (2022) ▲ Rs 201 Cr (2021)
- Website: www.pepperfry.com

Pepperfry Limited, formerly known as Pepperfry, is an Indian online marketplace for furniture and home décor. The company was founded in July 2011 by Ambareesh Murty and Ashish Shah, and is headquartered in Mumbai. As of 2023, Pepperfry has 43 company-owned studios and 142 studios operating under its franchise model.

In May 2022, the company became a public company and announced plans to list on stock exchanges.

As per reviews present in mouthshut, Pepperfry is rated as 1.3 star by 35,099 valid users.

== History ==
Pepperfry was founded in Mumbai in 2011 by Ambareesh Murty and Ashish Shah, both former eBay executives. The company opened its first offline store in Mumbai in 2014 and expanded to over 70 stores across 28 cities in India by 2019. It currently operates 43 company-owned studios in 13 cities and 142 franchise-owned studios in 109 cities, along with a logistics network, PepCart. In 2020, Pepperfry entered the home interior space through partnerships with companies such as Hettich, Bosch, Siemens, Kajaria, and Gyproc, among others.

Pepperfry has warehouses in Bangalore, Jodhpur, Mumbai, and Delhi. In 2023, it added a fifth warehouse in Bangalore's Hoskote area.

In 2023, Pepperfry appointed Ashish Shah as the new CEO after the demise of former chief, Ambareesh Murty.

== Funding ==
Pepperfry has raised a total of $285.3 million through ten funding rounds. In 2011, the company secured $5 million in its initial funding round, followed by an additional $8 million in a Series B funding round in 2013. Both funding rounds were led by Norwest Venture Partners India (NVP).

In May 2015, Pepperfry raised $15 million in a Series C funding round, with participation from Bertelsmann India Investments and NVP.

In July 2015, the company raised $100 million in a Series D funding round. This round included investments from early backers as well as notable investors such as Goldman Sachs and Zodius Technology Fund.

In 2016, Pepperfry raised a total of $69 million in a Series E funding round, with State Street Global Advisors and existing investors contributing to the funding.

In 2020, Pepperfry secured $40 million in a Series F funding round, with Pidilite Industries taking the lead as the main investor.

In 2021, Pepperfry raised $5 million in funding, and later on, an additional $40 million through a round of debt funding. The investors in this round included Norwest Venture, General Electric Pension Trust, and 45 family businesses and trusts.

== Marketing and campaigns ==
Pepperfry launched the Swadeshi Is Great campaign in 2023 to celebrate and support local artisans and their products.

== Awards and recognition ==
- 2012 Red Herring Asia Top 100 award.
- 2014: Awarded the "Pure-Play e-Retailer of the Year" at the Indian e-Retail Congress.
- 2019: Entrepreneur magazine recognized Pepperfry as one of the top 10 startups.
