= Stardust Awards =

Award

- Awarded for: Best in film
- Country: India
- Presented by: Stardust
- First award: 2004
- Final award: 2017
- Website: http://www.magnamags.com/index.php

The Stardust Awards was an award ceremony for Hindi movies, which was sponsored by Stardust magazine. Here is a list of the award winners and the films for which they won. The first ceremony was held in 2004 for films released in 2003. The last awards ceremony happened in 2016, with several Discontinued, Intermittent and Special Awards.

== Awards ==
=== Editor's Choice ===
- Film of the Year
- Filmmaker of the Year
- Performer of the Year - Male
- Performer of the Year - Female

=== Main Awards ===
- Best Film of the Year - Since 2003
- Best Supporting Actor - Since 2003
- Best Supporting Actress - Since 2003
- Best Director - Since 2009
- Best Actor - Since 2009
- Best Actress - Since 2009
- Best Playback – Male- Since 2014
- Best Playback – Female- Since 2014

=== Discontinued, Intermittent and Special Awards ===
Film

- Best Film
- Best Film – Comedy or Romance
- Best Film – Drama
- Best Film – Thriller or Action
- Hottest Film of The Year

Direction

- Best Director – Comedy or Romance
- Best Director – Thriller or Action
- Best Director – Drama
- Hottest New Director

Acting

- Best Actor in a Comedy or Romance
- Best Actress in a Comedy or Romance
- Best Actor in a Drama
- Best Actress in a Drama
- Best Actor in a Thriller or Action
- Best Actress in a Thriller or Action
- Superstar of Tomorrow – Male
- Superstar of Tomorrow – Female
- Best Breakthrough Performance – Male
- Best Breakthrough Performance – Female

Music

- Standout Performance by a Music Director
- Standout Performance by a Lyricist
- New Musical Sensation – Male
- New Musical Sensation – Female

Special awards

- Best Director of the Millennium – Raj Kapoor (posthumously)
- Best Artists of the Millennium – Amitabh Bachchan and Nargis (posthumously)
- Pride of Film Industry Award – Rajesh Khanna, Shatrughan Sinha, Feroz Khan, Amitabh Bachchan and Vyjayanthimala
- Best Singer of the Millennium - Mohammed Rafi (posthumously)
- Voice of the Millennium - Lata Mangeshkar
- Exciting New Face –Isha Koppikar(2003), Sameera Reddy(2004), Ayesha Kapur(2006), Shriya Saran (2009), Jacqueline Fernandez (2010)
- Style Icon of The Year - Deepika Padukone (2012), Bipasha Basu (2013), Jacqueline Fernandez (2014), Parineeti Chopra (2015), Shraddha Kapoor (2018)
- Star of the Century - Amitabh Bachchan (2013)

== See also ==
- Bollywood
- Cinema of India
