= My Name Is Khan =

2010 Indian film by Karan Johar

- Theatrical release poster
- Directed by: Karan Johar
- Written by: Shibani Bathija
- Dialogues by: Shibani Bathija; Niranjan Iyengar
- Produced by: Hiroo Yash Johar; Gauri Khan
- Starring: Shah Rukh Khan; Kajol
- Cinematography: Ravi K. Chandran
- Edited by: Deepa Bhatia
- Music by: Shankar–Ehsaan–Loy
- Production companies: Fox Searchlight Pictures; Dharma Productions; Red Chillies Entertainment
- Distributed by: United States: Fox Searchlight Pictures; India: Fox Star Studios; International: 20th Century Fox
- Release dates: 10 February 2010 (Dubai); 12 February 2010 (Worldwide)
- Running time: 161 minutes
- Countries: India; Hong Kong; United States
- Languages: Hindi; English
- Budget: ₹85 crore
- Box office: ₹223.44 crore

My Name Is Khan is a 2010 drama film directed by Karan Johar and co-written by Shibani Bathija and Niranjan Iyengar. It stars Shah Rukh Khan and Kajol in the lead roles. The film narrates the fictional story in which Rizvan Khan (Khan), an autistic Muslim, sets out on a journey across the United States to meet the President after Mandira Rathod Khan (Kajol), his Hindu wife, suffers from Islamophobic discrimination following the September 11 attacks.

Johar began developing the film in 2007, seeking a departure from his previous romantic films; it is Johar's first directorial effort for which he did not contribute to the screenplay. Johar and Bathija extensively researched autism in preparation for the film, especially Asperger syndrome, as well as Islam. The film was co-produced by Johar's mother, Hiroo Yash Johar, and Khan's wife, Gauri Khan, under their respective production companies, Dharma Productions and Red Chillies Entertainment. Khan and Kajol's involvement was confirmed by May 2008, with the remainder of the cast rounded out by January 2009. Principal photography began in December 2008 and lasted until October 2009, with filming locations including Los Angeles, Mumbai, and San Francisco. The film's soundtrack was composed by Shankar–Ehsaan–Loy.

My Name Is Khan first premiered in the United Arab Emirates on 10 February 2010 and was theatrically released worldwide two days later by 20th Century Fox. The first Indian original motion picture to be produced under Fox Searchlight Pictures and presented and distributed by Fox Star Studios in its maiden venture on a global platform, it received widespread acclaim for its subject matter, direction, music, screenplay, cinematography, performances, particularly of Khan, and social message. It grossed ₹223 crore (US$48.77 million) worldwide, becoming one of the highest-grossing Hindi film of 2010 and the second-highest-grossing Indian film of 2010. It received numerous awards and nominations, including three wins at the 56th Filmfare Awards. It is used as a scholarly case study for its cinematic portrayal of autism and Islamophobia.

== Plot ==
Rizvan Khan, an Indian Muslim with Asperger's syndrome, grows up in Mumbai with his mother, Razia, and his brother, Zakir. Due to his condition, Rizvan receives specialized tutoring from a reclusive local scholar, Mr. Wadia, earning him extra affection from his mother—a dynamic that breeds resentment in Zakir. Following their mother's death, Zakir, who has relocated to San Francisco and is now married to a college professor, Hasina, sponsors Rizvan to join him in the United States. Upon his arrival in California, Hasina formally diagnoses Rizvan's condition, and he begins working as a distributor for Zakir’s beauty product company. While working, he falls in love with Mandira Rathod, a Hindu single mother and hairstylist. Despite Zakir's disapproval of the interfaith match, Rizvan and Mandira marry, and she and her young son, Sameer "Sam" Rathore, take his surname. The family moves to the peaceful suburb of Banville, striking up a warm friendship with their neighbors, the Garricks, comprising reporter Mark, his wife Sarah and their son Reese.

Their idyllic life is shattered in the aftermath of the September 11 attacks. As Islamophobia spikes across the nation, Mark travels to cover the war in Afghanistan and is killed in action. Traumatized and angry, Reese begins to turn against Sam. The latter's persistent endeavour to rekindle talking terms with the former culminates in a violent confrontation at a community soccer field, where a group of older students attack Sam. During the assault, he dies from a spleen rupture; Reese is threatened by the older boys with consequences in case he confesses anything.

A grieving and devastated Mandira blames Rizvan, shouting that her son died solely because they carried the surname "Khan." Still seething with anger, she demands that he leave. When a confused Rizvan asks when he may return, Mandira sarcastically tells him he can come back only when he has traveled across the country to tell the American people and the President of the United States that his "name is Khan" and he "is not a terrorist". Taking her words literally, Rizvan sets out on a cross-country journey to track down President George W. Bush on his campaign trail.

During his travels, Rizvan stops in Wilhelmina, a small, impoverished rural town in Georgia, where he befriends a young boy named Joel and his mother, Jenny, earning the gratitude of the tight-knit local community. Later, in Los Angeles, Rizwan visits a mosque where he overhears a radical doctor, Faisal Rehman, inciting his followers to violence. Disturbed by the message, Rizwan publicly confronts Faisal, rejects his extremist views, and reports him to the FBI.

Rizwan’s quest leads him to a presidential rally at the UCLA. Standing in the crowd, he repeatedly shouts, "My name is Khan, and I am not a terrorist!" His behavior is misinterpreted by the tense crowd, sparking a panic that leads to his arrest and detention. He undergoes harsh interrogation until a pair of young Indian student journalists, Raj Burman and Komal Kukreti, uncovers his story with help from renowned Indian-American journalist Bobby Ahuja, broadcasting his innocent motives and his prior attempt to report Faisal to the FBI. The media attention triggers a massive public movement, forcing the authorities to release him.

Shortly after Rizvan's release, a devastating hurricane strikes Wilhelmina, Georgia. He immediately travels back to the ruined town to lead relief efforts, inspiring volunteers and media crews from across the country to join him. Back in California, Reese sees Rizvan on the news. Burdened by guilt, he finally confesses to Mandira that he witnessed the attack on Sam and names the senior boys. Inspector Garcia, the detective who had been working on Sam's case, has the perpetrators, including Reese, arrested, though Mandira pleads for leniency to Reese for Sarah's sake.

A message from Sarah, urging her not to let tragedy destroy her marriage, prompts Mandira to finally travel to Georgia. She reunites with Rizvan in a now recovered Wilhelmina just as he is stabbed by one of Faisal’s radical followers. Rizvan survives the attack and eventually meets the newly elected President Barack Obama. The President publicly acknowledges him, stating, "Your name is Khan and you are not a terrorist". Rizvan softly adds that his stepson, Sameer, was not a terrorist either. United in their shared grief and love, Rizvan and Mandira finally return home together.

== Cast ==
- Shah Rukh Khan as Rizvan Khan
  - Adarsh Gourav as teenage Rizvan
    - Tanay Chheda as young Rizvan
- Kajol as Mandira Rathod Khan
- Jimmy Sheirgill as Zakir Khan, Rizvan's brother
  - Jaikishen Bhatia as young Zakir
- Sonya Jehan as Hasina Khan, Zakir's wife
- Zarina Wahab as Razia Khan, Rizvan and Zakir's mother
- Arjan Aujla as Sameer Khan, Mandira's son and Rizvan's stepson
- Kenton Duty as Reese Garrick, Sam's friend
- Katie A. Keane as Sarah Garrick
- Dominic Renda as Mark Garrick
- Christopher B. Duncan as Barack Obama
- Parvin Dabas as Bobby Ahuja
- Arjun Mathur as Raj Burman
- Sugandha Garg as Komal Kukreti
- Kavin Dave as Inder Patel
- Arif Zakaria as Dr. Faisal Rahman
- Vinay Pathak as Jitesh Pandit, a Gujarati motel owner
- Sumeet Raghavan as Faisal's follower
- Navneet Nishan as Rita Singh
- Sheetal Menon as Radha
- Jennifer Echols as Mama Jenny
- Adrian Kali Tucker as Funny Hair Joel
- Chirag Dave as Imran
- Pallavi Sharda as Sajida
- Benny Nieves as Detective Garcia

== Production ==
=== Development ===
"I am one of those people who is very open-minded about religion. I don't have any prejudices. When there's talk about Islam and terrorism, and the association between the two, I believe there are larger political reasons for everything. You can't generalize about a religion. There are millions of people across the world who are Muslim, who are suffering on account of a faulty perception, and I felt very strongly that I wanted to tell that story."

— Karan Johar, 2017

Having worked on a number of romantic dramas and consequently become known for these, Karan Johar desired to experiment with a new genre. He wanted it to be one that would attract critical and commercial success, as well as help prove his ability of making non-romantic films to his audience. Eventually, the idea of making a socially relevant film came to his mind, "because that is what those kinds of people like". He chose to depict Islam as a main topic of discussion — an action that he described as a "conscious decision" — since he felt there is an international unawareness and negative generalization towards the religion. While himself belonging not to the religion, he called himself educated and open-minded enough to understand that misconceptions against Islam exist. As a filmmaker, Johar wanted to communicate with his audience of his message, which is "correcting the world's misconceptions about Islam", in an emotional, yet effective, manner.

In November 2007, Bollywood Hungama reported a then-untitled upcoming project by Johar. The filmmaker told the entertainment portal that there would be possibility it would be rather titled My Name Is Khan or simply Khan. In a July 2008 article in his personal blog, Johar confirmed the title as My Name Is Khan, breaking his tradition of initiating his works' titles with the letter "K". He said, "While deciding upon the title, I just went by my gut and decided on something which brings to fore the spirit of the film and the story that I wanted to tell. Everything was decided in true earnest. The right title of the film was and stays on as My Name Is Khan."

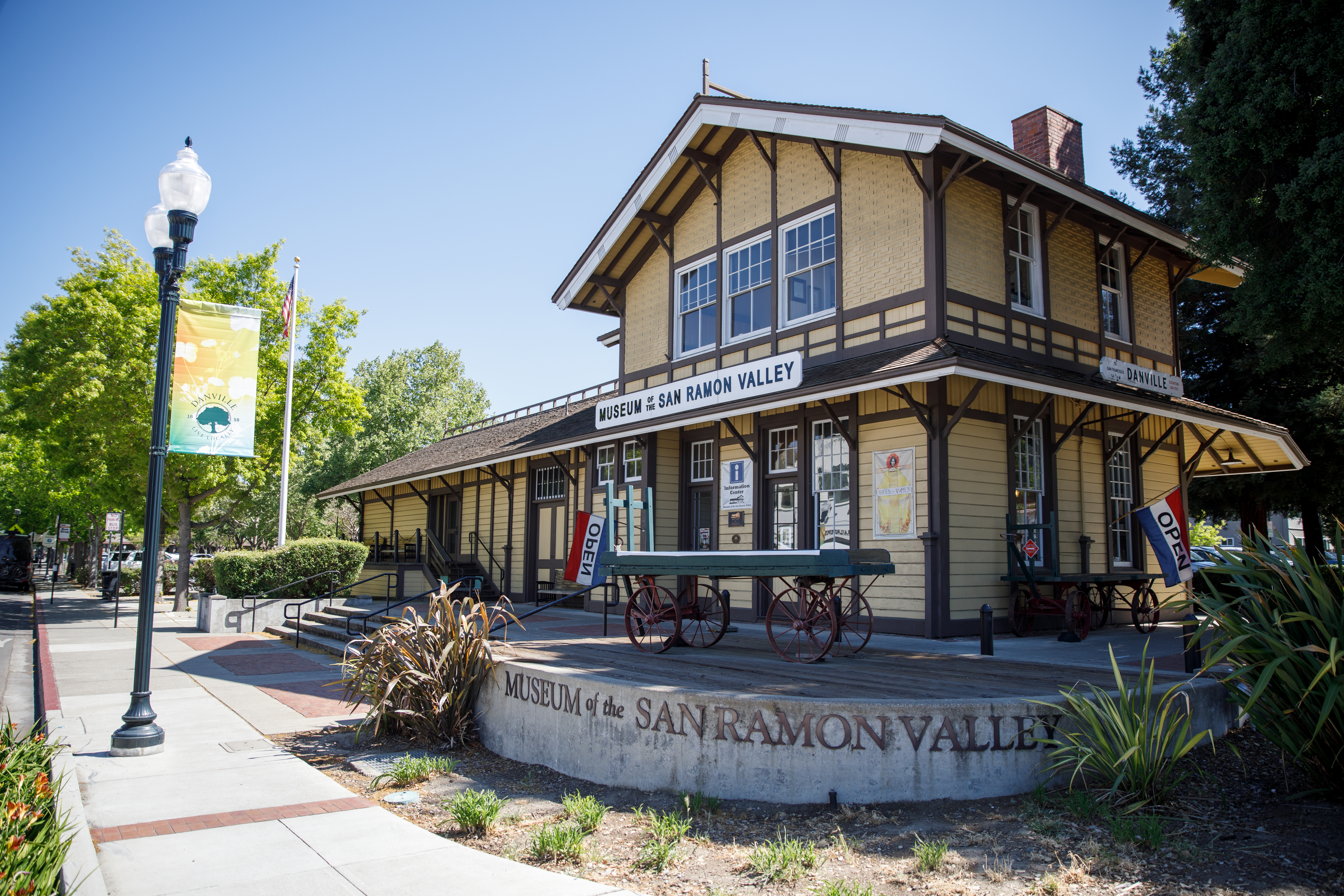
Danville, California (pictured) was the inspiration behind the fictional town Banville

Shibani Bathija wrote the story and screenplay while penning the dialogues with Johar's then-regular collaborator Niranjan Iyengar, thus making My Name Is Khan Johar's first film he did not write himself, though he still helped her in the research. According to Johar, it gave him "a level of detachment from the proceedings and yet, a lot of attachment" and released "unexplored emotions". In preparation, Bathija and Johar met a lot of people with autism, including those who have Asperger's syndrome; Bathija also read books about their condition, including An Asperger Marriage and Aspergers in Love, non-fictions about the life of a woman with his husband, who suffers from Asperger. Johar suggested to have a Muslim character in the lead and set the film in the September 11 attacks, which Bathija eventually agreed with.

Geographically, the story is set in the San Francisco Bay Area, which came to Bathija's inspirations because of her familiarity with the place while finishing her communication study at the San Francisco State University between 1998 and 2000. Her motivation to use it as the film's backdrop increased in 2007 after seeing many Bollywood films also being shot there. A fictional town, Banville, which she described as "a stereotypically white, upper-class Bay Area suburb", was also added into the story. In an interview to the East Bay Express, Bathija recounted that while researching for the San Francisco Bay by Google Maps from Mumbai, she spotted Danville, California, which fitted her criteria of a location that resembles a "small, very rich suburban town". Beside that, Bathija also wrote the English-language dialogues, while Niranjan Iyengar wrote the Hindi ones. A number of Arabic phrases, mostly in religious context, were also added.

The film was co-produced by Hiroo Yash Johar of Karan Johar's Dharma Productions and Gauri Khan of Shah Rukh Khan's Red Chillies Entertainment. The partnership was announced in February 2009; on co-producing the film under his own banner, Shah Rukh Khan said he disliked to presell films, especially non-commercial ones, like My Name Is Khan, and wanted Johar to finish it without taking a loan as well as to collectively own the film. The budget was estimated to have been ₹550 million (US$12.03 million), according to the financial newspaper Mint. The production was also handled in part with the American production houses Fox Star Studios and Fox Searchlight Pictures. Fox Star's involvement to distribute the film was announced in August; however, the company's exact paid amount for the rights was disputed, with unconfirmed estimations ranging from ₹810 million (US$17.71 million) to ₹1 billion (US$21.87 million), and its executives refused to disclose the number. In February 2010, the Abu Dhabi-based Image Nation joined to distributed the film, and nine months later, the Hong Kong-based Huaxia Film Distribution followed.

=== Casting ===
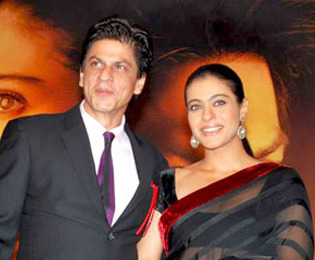
Shah Rukh Khan and Kajol were cast in the lead roles and also made their Hollywood debut.

Shanoo Sharma and Robi Reed handled the casting of My Name Is Khan. The earliest press reports appeared in October 2007, when Shah Rukh Khan and Kajol were reported to be cast in the lead. Karan Johar, however, clarified that while Shah Rukh Khan had accepted the offer, he had not been able to confirm whether Kajol would be in the casting, saying that he had not talked with her yet. During this period, Kareena Kapoor was reported to have offered herself to play opposite Shah Rukh Khan, until May 2008 at the time Kajol confirmed her presence. My Name Is Khan became Shah Rukh Khan and Kajol's sixth collaboration, after Baazigar (1993), Karan Arjun (1995), Dilwale Dulhania Le Jayenge (1995), Kuch Kuch Hota Hai (1998) and Kabhi Khushi Kabhie Gham (2001), the latter two were also directed by Karan Johar.

Before Jimmy Sheirgill, Aamir Bashir and then R. Madhavan were originally chosen to play the role of Zakir, Rizwan's younger brother. The latter left the film to prioritise his role in 3 Idiots (2009). When filming began in December 2008, the United States authority refused to give Bashir a visa to travel to that because he did not mention his travel to Iran in the application form; since the Mumbai attacks, the country had been cautious of foreigners. The incident attracted considerable media attention, which led to his exclusion from the casting; he later worked with Johar 13 years later on Rocky Aur Rani Kii Prem Kahaani, Johar's first film without Khan. Shabana Azmi was initially cast for portraying Rizwan's mother, Razia. However, owing to a delay caused by Shah Rukh Khan's shoulder surgery in January 2009, Azmi opted out; she continued to shoot for Gurinder Chadha-directed comedy-drama, It's a Wonderful Afterlife (2010). The role eventually went to Zarina Wahab, with Azmi also ultimately working with Johar in Rocky Aur Rani Kii Prem Kahaani.

In January 2009, Pakistani actress Sonya Jehan was reported to join the casting to play the supporting role of university professor Hasina Khan. Unlike Jehan's previous films that shows her in revealing clothes, this one has her wearing a hijab, the traditional head-covering for Muslim women. She was particularly drawn to her character and expressed a desire to play similar roles in the future. Child artist Tanay Chheda played the role of young Rizwan. Chheda's performance in the widely-acclaimed drama Slumdog Millionaire (2008), his resemblance of Shah Rukh Khan's appearance and his familiarity with Mumbai slums were the basis for Karan Johar to cast him. Instead of putting the footages of then-President Barack Obama, an actor physically similar to him was chosen. Forest Whitaker was the original possibility for the role, but he declined owing to conflicting schedule and disinclination to play Obama who was still in his office. The role eventually went to Christopher B. Duncan, who was cast two months after an audition.

=== Characters ===
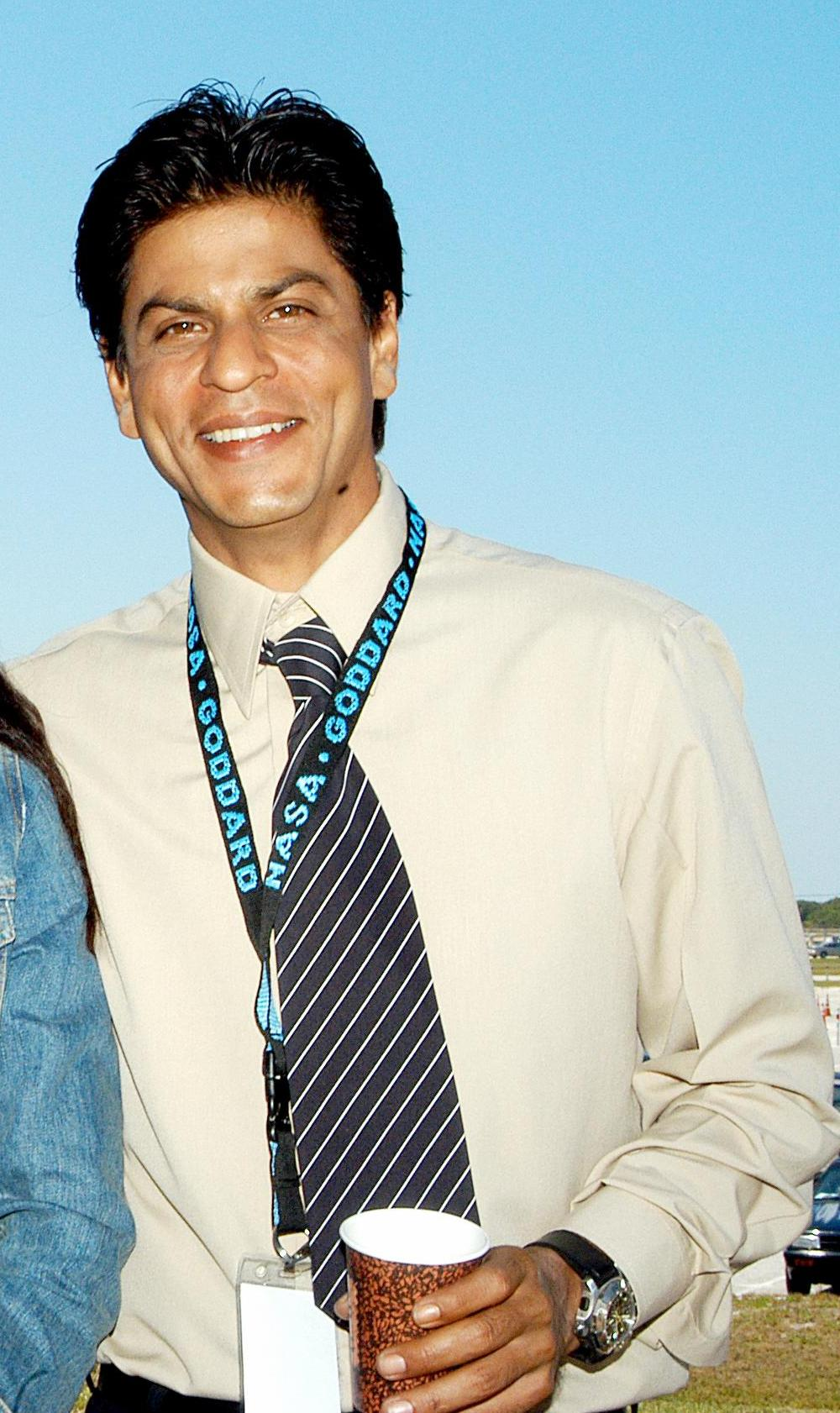
Shah Rukh Khan, who played the autistic Rizvan in My Name Is Khan, had his own research to the character

Johar and Bathija researched extensively for Shah Rukh Khan's character in My Name Is Khan for two years, and this included their personal study of Asperger's syndrome and contact with autistic people from various centers in London, New York, Los Angeles and India. When interviewed by Bollywood Hungama, he admitted to have helped her by "just executing her vision". Johar and Bathija met Christopher and Gisela Slater-Walker, who wrote An Asperger Marriage, and he described the former as having been their significant inspiration for the character. They also had a rendezvous with Chris and Maxine Aston (Aspergers in Love's writers), whom Johar said to have been the "basis" for Rizvan and Mandira's relationship. Their research also included gathering information related to the condition from YouTube videos.

Shah Rukh Khan did his own research to his role, which Bathija stated to have been written specifically for him. He said that he was nervous but at the same time excited to play the type of role, which he had never done before. Johar described him as being challenged, even considering Rizvan to be Shah Rukh Khan's "most challenging" character. Khan himself referred to it as "the most interesting part" of his career as an actor, seeing that he could spread awareness about a condition that is rarely suffered from. His film characters are mainly secular; they are not especially focused on their religious background, but the one in My Name Is Khan is. Alluding to its autism, he referred to his My Name Is Khan character as a "neuro-atypical mind, who could do less and say more".

Johar sent Khan to the centers he had previously visited with Bathija; he wanted him to socialize with autistic people, predominantly those with Asperger, and 'make his own' Rizvan based on these interactions. Beside videos, Khan continued his research with reading books about the syndrome, including the mystery novel The Curious Incident of the Dog in the Night-Time. Johar observed that his research for the character was particularly extensive, admitting that it astonished him: "I was zapped by how much he knew on the subject. And he brought all the knowledge on the sets." While playing his character, Khan maintained expressionless eyes even when he was saying his dialogues, which he found difficult. To get it right, he practiced in a bathroom for ten consecutive days.

"My challenge is here is a character who does not feel love, who does not know how to cry or laugh, sing or dance, and yet in this film, I am going to be the most romantic hero ... You will at the end of the film feel, 'Oh my god, I wish he could be in love with me', knowing fully well my character does not feel love, he does not cry. I don't think I can succeed in convincing you that he is a lovable guy. And yet you feel for this man, you love him. That is the challenge I have in this film."

— Shah Rukh Khan on his character

Los Angeles-based Robin Slater, who had worked in films including How the Grinch Stole Christmas (2000), Memoirs of a Geisha (2005) and Dreamgirls (2006), was appointed to be Shah Rukh Khan's makeup artist by producer Prashant Shah. Slater described his look as "a natural sun-kissed one, very natural. He looks fresh and they all thought he looked much younger." She did his makeup in six steps and six minutes, starting with using a concealer to get rid of the flaws from his face. She then airbrushed the foundation on, put sunburn stipple around his chin, cheekbones, forehead, jaw and nose, and shaded the nose and jawline. After using powder gel to make him as if he wore no makeup, Slater removed airbrush overflow on his eyebrows and eyelashes.

Kajol was given with the role of Mandira, Rizvan's Hindu wife with a son from her previous marriage. She found My Name Is Khan to be thematically similar to Karan Johar's previous films, noting Kabhi Khushi Kabhie Gham for instance. However, she added "there was more masala in them" in comparison to My Name Is Khan, which she called his deepest one. The complexity of Mandira made her emotionally engaged to it, and Kajol stated that this experience eventually gave her a life lesson: "It is okay to be imperfect as a human being." She described My Name Is Khan as an intense collaboration with Johar, who asked her to lose weight for characterization.

In an interview to Indo-Asian News Service, Johar said that Kajol had always been the one in his mind while casting for an actress to play Mandira. On her spontaneous nature, he commented, "[t]here is no method to her madness. She is sheer brilliance. Her expressions connect you immediately. She is all real, all woman, all human on screen and I don't think any living actress has the quality that Kajol has." His frequent collaborator, Manish Malhotra, was specifically chosen as her costume designer. As for her role as a San Francisco-based hairstylist, Kajol wore colourful clothes, including jackets and trousers; while her character is at home, she would be given more tracks and sweaters. In one of her scenes, she featured in a red sari, which was not Malhotra's design but was bought from a shop. Johar said that she did not want the fashion to distract the film's messages. Shiraz Siddique handled the rest of the cast's costumes.

=== Filming ===
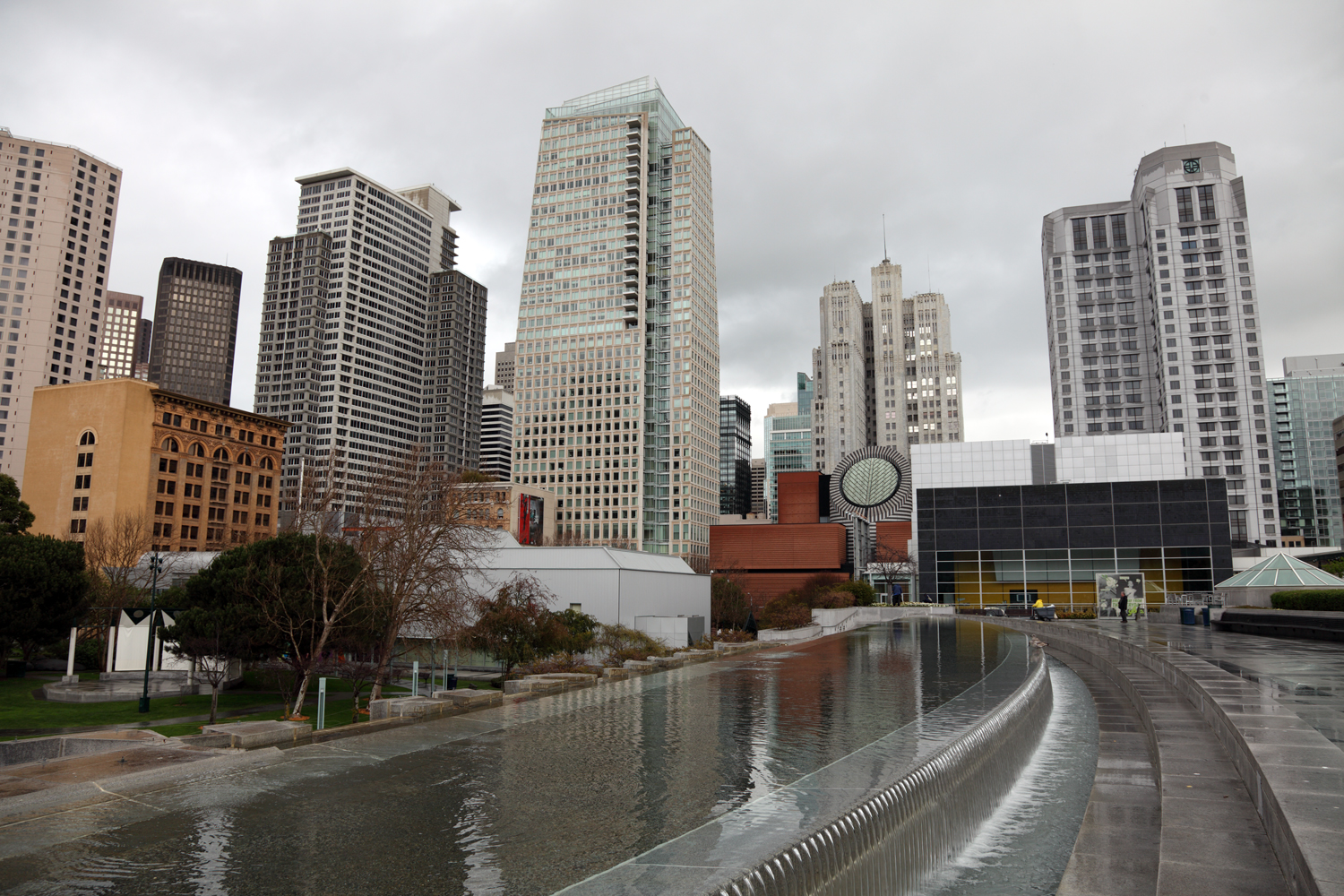
San Francisco, where an extensive portion of the film was shot

Principal photography was commenced by Ravi K. Chandran on 18 December 2008 in Los Angeles. Farah Khan and Sham Kaushal provided the choreography and action respectively, while Sharmishta Roy served as the production designer, and Mohammed Kasim and Mansi Dhruv Mehta were the art directors. Among members of the direction team were associate Karan Malhotra, who would later direct the 2012 remake of Agneepath, an earlier classic produced by Johar's late father Yash, as well as assistants Sidharth Malhotra and Varun Dhawan, who would later make their film debuts with Johar's next directorial venture Student of the Year, also presented by Khan; other members included Armaan Jain, who would later make his acting debut with the 2014 film Lekar Hum Deewana Dil whose title was suggested by Johar, and Urvashi Shah, who had briefly appeared in a minor role in Jaane Tu... Ya Jaane Na (2008). In January 2009, after a one-month schedule, Khan went on to shoot an action scene in Dulha Mil Gaya (2010) but faced an accident that injured his shoulder. He underwent a physical therapy, and in the next month a surgery that made the shooting was delayed until the next month. After filming was continued, he faced severe migraines but only taking pills to relieve these. When the pain worsened he checked up to a doctor; his migraines were proven to have been the result of being in leaning position and raising his eyebrows for hours, which were required for his character. In January 2010, he had another physical therapy.

The Los Angeles schedule began in March 2009. In the next month, the slum scenes were shot in Borivali. The next two days, the film was shot at a mosque in Andheri. Filming then moved to San Francisco in May 2009 for a 40-day schedule. Coinciding with the start of the 2009 swine flu pandemic, it was done secretly to avoid public attention, and finished a month afterwards. In August 2009, the cast and crew moved to Film City for shooting the hurricane scene. For the sets, Josh Maidain designed a dam of 135 by 240 metres (443 ft × 787 ft), along with churches and small houses. A 150 by 150 feet (46 m × 46 m) tank was also made, and approximately 12 thousand liters of water were used for the scene. This schedule, which was the last of the production, began on 1 September and was completed in a month. During the filming, a snake reportedly entered the tank and panicked all the workers. My Name Is Khan was edited by Deepa Bhatia, while Dileep Subramaniam and Anuj Mathur were involved in the sound design. The film's final cut runs for 155 minutes.

== Music ==
Shankar–Ehsaan–Loy composed the soundtrack to My Name Is Khan, while Iyengar and Javed Akhtar (uncredited) provided the lyrics. My Name Is Khan features eight singers: Rahat Fateh Ali Khan, Shankar Mahadevan, Richa Sharma, Shreya Ghoshal, Adnan Sami, Shafqat Amanat Ali, Rashid Khan and Suraj Jagan. The film has six original songs and four additional songs taken from Karan Johar's previous films, which are played in background without lip sync. The album was released on 6 January 2010 by Sony Music to positive reviews and was a commercial success.

== Marketing ==
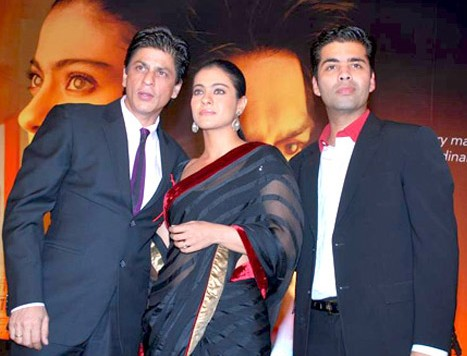
Khan, Kajol and Johar while unveiling the first look of the film

My Name Is Khan was screened as part of 60th Berlin International Film Festival's Official Selection in February 2010, out of competition. The website eBay auctioned the tickets for the film's screening at the Berlin Film Festival for a record price of £1,000 stg (₹60,000) each. All the tickets were sold out in five seconds.

The first look of My Name Is Khan unveiled at a grand ceremony at Mumbai by Johar, Khan and Kajol and was then beamed across 70 countries worldwide on the Star TV Network. Johar was excited and noted, "This is a first in the history of Bollywood – that the promos of a film will play across such a wide platform. And, this has mainly been made possible because of our synergy with Fox Star Studios ... and also the first time an Indian company is tying up with a mainstream American studio. So, there are many firsts to this venture." The trailer of the film was released at the premiere of Avatar (2009). My Name Is Khan marked the first instance of a film using the roadblock advertising technique to market a film, in which the three-minute trailer was aired on all leading television channels simultaneously.

I will add that MNIK is a very special topic about humanity in the garb of a Muslim character ... The film is made on a large canvas and the subject material is adapted in terms of humanity in a very entertaining way ... the message of love, the way it has been shot internationally and the way of releasing it, might have all the possibilities of an international release. It is going to be released in a way no Hindi film has been released internationally before

— Shah Rukh Khan's response to questions siting the film as "international" with a "far reaching influence" that should be seen by all

Reebok created an entire MNIK Footwear and Apparel Collection to promote the film.

On 1 February 2010, Khan and Kajol became the first Indian film stars to ring the opening bell of the New York stock exchange NASDAQ. They were invited by Fox Searchlight Pictures to do so as part of their promotion for My Name Is Khan. Khan also appeared on Friday Night with Jonathan Ross as part of its promotion in the UK, becoming only the second Indian after Shilpa Shetty to do so.

== Release ==
=== Theatrical ===
My Name Is Khan debuted in Abu Dhabi, UAE on 10 February 2010. It released globally in cinemas on 12 February 2010. MNIK had a two phase release. To begin with, it had a mainstream release in India coupled with a regular Diaspora release in UK, US, Gulf, Australia and various other countries. "After that in the months of April and May, we would be looking at a mainstream theatrical release in countries like Germany, Poland and other parts of North America", detailed Johar.

==== Pre-sale records ====
On 7 August 2009, Khan signed a worldwide distribution deal for the film with Fox Star Studios for ₹1 billion (equivalent to ₹2.7 billion or US$29 million in 2026). Fox Star Studios distributed the film in India, while its sister studio Fox Searchlight Pictures distributed it in the United States. Sony Music India acquired the rights to the film's soundtrack.

=== Home media ===
The film was released in India on DVD on 21 April 2010, Blu-ray in India, plus a DVD release worldwide followed on 17 August 2010.

In the United Kingdom, it was 2012's sixth most-watched foreign-language film on television with 210,000 viewers on Channel 4, and the year's second most-watched Asian film (below the multinational co-production film Red Cliff).

=== Game ===
ASTPL, an Indian software developer, also released a mobile video game based on the film.

== Reception ==
=== Critical response ===
My Name Is Khan received widespread acclaim from overseas publications, most of which echoed the same sentiments as of domestic critics. On the review aggregator website Rotten Tomatoes, 86% of 29 critics' reviews are positive, with an average rating of 6.7/10. The website's consensus reads: "My Name Is Khan rests on powerful performances to tell an affecting story that blends timely themes and old-fashioned Bollywood melodrama." Metacritic, which uses a weighted average, assigned the film a score of 50 out of 100, based on 7 critics, indicating "mixed or average" reviews.

==== India ====
My Name Is Khan received widespread acclaim upon release, with praise directed towards its direction, story, screenplay, cinematography, production design, soundtrack and the leads' performances, and has often been referred to as Johar's magnum opus.

In a 4 1/2-star review, Taran Adarsh wrote that Shah Rukh Khan's performance was his career's best so far and "no amount of praise can do sufficient justice to his portrayal". Adarsh also praised the decision to cast Kajol, whom he regarded as the one with the strongest chemistry with Shah Rukh Khan, and described her as having given "a powerhouse performance". Rediff.com's Raja Sen said Karan Johar had made "his first grown-up film", and described it as one "that will inspire, make aware, make happy". Sudhish Kamath wrote of the character Rizwan as "the epitome of goodness and surprisingly, the filmmaker tones down his sense of drama several notches, showing great restraint for at least two-thirds of the film".

Writing for The Hindu, Bhavishek Shah called the film a landmark to the careers of the director and its lead actors. The critic opined Shah Rukh Khan succeeded in playing his part: "Completely getting under the skin of the character, Shah Rukh has picked up every single nuance of an Asperger's syndrome patient without making it appear labored." Savera R. Someshwar of Rediff.com wrote that Kajol delivered a fine performance, taking note of her "laughter, her determination, her joie de vivre, her grief, her anger — Kajol brings it all to life. And, if I may say so, Kajol, no one runs up a hill dressed in a night suit, wearing floppy slippers, with no make-up on, as well as you do." Pratim D. Gupta of The Telegraph wrote that Shah Rukh Khan is outstanding and called his presence to be emotional equilibrium, and was excited to see him collaborating once again with Kajol. Writing for the Bangalore Mirror, Minty Tejpal saw the film was intended for an international market, noting its story that includes Islamophobia and African-American community.

"But the real bravery award should go to director-producer Karan Johar, who dispenses with the designer preciousness of his previous films to come as close as this to something real, something important. He sets it all up beautifully, and looks set to carry it through but loses his conviction towards the end by drumming up a forced climax. In trying to make Rizwan Khan more heroic than he already is ... the smooth arc of the film is derailed."

— Shubhra Gupta of The Indian Express

BBC's Manish Gajjar believed Shah Rukh Khan had shown his versatility as an actor within his emotional performance and considered it to be his best. On Kajol, Gajjar thought she had given an equally commendable performance, especially in the second half where her character, Mandira, is shown as being egocentric after losing her son. Minu Jain of The New Indian Express complimented Karan Johar for exploring a genre that is not romance-centric and labelled the film "a road journey through a troubled post 9/11 America towards humanism". Mayank Shekhar of the Hindustan Times also praised his move to experiment outside the typically musical Bollywood cinema; Shekhar wrote positively of Bathija's screenplay, which he called compelling enough for praise. Subhash K. Jha referred to the film as "a flawless work, as perfect in content, tone and treatment as any film can get". Anna M. M. Vetticad lauded My Name Is Khan's story, claiming that it had been able to made her cry.

Anupama Chopra said Shah Rukh Khan's character Rizwan as the greatest part of the film. Sukanya Venkatraghavan of Filmfare asserted, "To say MNIK is a warm-the-cockles film about a man with Asperger syndrome who overcomes all odds and triumphs would be to pigeonhole it. The movie has a larger picture-one of humanity, tolerance, redemption and above all love." Kaveree Bamzai of India Today said the film deserves to be watched not for its message but Shah Rukh Khan. Alike views were shared by Rajeev Masand, who encouraged people to watch it for the cast; Masand further stated that the message of religious tolerance is significant but not unique. Mid-Day's Sarita Tanwar argued, "In a near-perfect film, the only over-the-top part is Rizwan's return to a flood-hit small town to save the African-American family. It's stands out because everything else is so understated." A scathing opinion was expressed by Ajit Duara of Open magazine, who labelled it "an expensive and empty vessel", attributing it to "the naivete of its treatment and the hack job that Karan Johar does with all the actors in this huge production".

In a review to Ananda Bazar Patrika, Indroneil Sarkar disliked the film for its heavy subject and commented that the flood scene of the second half should have been edited out in entirety. Vinod Mirani of Box Office India criticized the film as "an average film, lavishly made", and remarked, "As a director, Karan has treated the subject too leisurely, and consequently the pace slows down and the film drags at time. He's trying to say too many things." Ajay Brahmatraj of Dainik Bhaskar, while commending Karan Johar for this time picking a complex subject, found the story not well written. Man's World's Maithili Rao wrote, "It works only in the first half. Post interval there's too much drama, in particular the flood scene. They were trying to make a hero of an ordinary man. That spoilt the effect of the first half." Deepa Gahlot of The Afternoon Despatch & Courier dismissed the film as being not one "that will evoke an instant reaction", concluding: "After a while, instead of feeling sympathetic, you are put off."

=== International ===
Rachel Saltz of The New York Times states, "Khan is one of a handful of Hindi films (New York, Kurbaan) about Indians living in a paranoid, post-9/11 America, and there's something fascinating about looking at this country through a Bollywood lens, even when the story is a kind of fairy tale. (Most interesting here is the link made between black Americans and Indians, especially Muslims.) Skilfully directed by Karan Johar and with an evocative score by Shankar, Ehsaan & Loy, Khan jerks tears with ease, while teaching lessons about Islam and tolerance." According to Kirk Honeycutt of The Hollywood Reporter, My Name Is Khan is, "a film that delves compellingly into Americans' anti-Muslim hysteria" as it tackles "a subject American movies have mostly avoided – that of racial profiling and the plight of Muslim-Americans. It also allows Shah Rukh Khan to display his talent to an even wider audience. It's well worth the 162-minute journey." Jay Wesissberg of Variety describes My Name Is Khan as a "riotously overstuffed and enormously enjoyable drama" with "confident camerawork [which] is matched by exceptional production design" He also states that Shah Rukh Khan and Kajol are a "delight together and her natural warmth makes the relationship even more believable."

"Western screenwriting guru Syd Field gets a credit for story consultancy, but the film is still very much structured according to Indian traditions. For instance, the interval is still used as the point where the film changes gear. As usual, the first half is more soap opera, spending plenty of getting-to-know-you time with the appealing characters before putting them through the wringer in the more politicized second section."

— Phelim O'Neill of The Guardian

In spite of being critical of the film's flood subplot and topics not fully explored, such as the Iraq War, Sight & Sound's Naman Ramachandran wrote Shah Rukh Khan carried out the film despite its flaws. Itrath Syed of The Georgia Straight called My Name Is Khan "a multilayered, politically nuanced, and emotionally demanding film". Syed noted there are "places where Johar leans too heavily on melodrama. Yet he does reveal an American experience in which fear and suspicion are commonplace, and to which people of color have simply adjusted." Mark Jenkins of NPR wrote the film "transplants Bollywood's audacious style and brazen sentimentality to Hollywood's America". Jenkins, however, was ambivalent of Shah Rukh Khan, whose characterization of Asperger syndrome the critic found to be dubious.

== Box office ==
My Name Is Khan opened very well in most places across the world, and set many records in the process. However, the performance of the film could not sustain beyond the first or second week in some places, including India and USA. The film's performance in India was quite good but still is generally regarded as "below expectations" due to the high budget, while the overseas performance of the film has been record breaking. By 4 April 2010, the worldwide gross revenue for My Name Is Khan from the box office was US$36,145,870. Domestically in India, My Name Is Khan generated a net of ₹825.2 million (equivalent to ₹2.0 billion or US$22 million in 2026) and a gross of ₹1.15 billion (equivalent to ₹2.8 billion or US$30 million in 2026). The film's final worldwide gross was ₹223.44 crore (US$48.86 million), including US$23.5 million (₹1,088.3 million) overseas.

=== India ===
In India, the film opened with a massive ₹295 million (US$6,356,688), which was the third-highest weekend net for a Bollywood film, behind 3 Idiots and Ghajini. It recorded the third-highest first day business across India, behind 3 Idiots and Ghajini at the time of release. The film broke the record of Race for the biggest opening weekend in the first quarter of the year. The film was reported to have done very well in multiplexes, but comparatively on the lower side in single screens. The film managed to net ₹460.8 million (equivalent to ₹1.1 billion or US$12 million in 2026) in its first week.

In rankings based on distributor share, My Name Is Khan comes in fifth behind Dabangg, Raajneeti, Golmaal 3 and Housefull; in a way bearing out Sajid Khan's boast that Housefull will surpass MNIK in India. The film managed to retain the No. 1 spot at the Indian box office for two consecutive weeks, and remained in the top five for six consecutive weeks. At the end of its theatrical run, the film earned ₹82.52 crore (US$18.05 million) in India.

The film faced considerable falls in collections after its first week. The drops in collections became evident from the fact that 63% of the film's net collections came from the first week, as compared to 54% for Race, 56% for Ghajini, 49% for Rab Ne Bana Di Jodi and 39% for 3 Idiots. In spite of this, the film managed to retain the No. 1 position at the box office for two consecutive weeks. It was in the top 5 list of the Indian box office for six consecutive weeks. Though the mid-week collections saw a drop of 60% from the opening weekend, it held up well against other major releases and secured the highest first quarter collections, a record previously held by Race. Thus, the film is a financial success owing to its record-breaking overseas collections and healthy domestic collections.

=== Overseas ===
My Name Is Khan grossed US$23.5 million in the overseas markets. The film grossed the biggest opening day overseas, taking an estimated ₹990 million (US$21.65 million), beating the overseas opening day collections of 3 Idiots. The film also grossed the biggest opening weekend overseas, taking an estimated ₹255 million (US$5.58 million), again beating the overseas opening weekend collections of 3 Idiots which grossed ₹185 million (US$4.05 million). In its first week, it grossed ₹393 million (US$8.59 million). As of August 2010, the film has grossed $4,018,771 in the United States and $37,001,087 elsewhere for a worldwide total of $41,019,858.

In the UK, it made £123,000 on its opening day, which was more than the combined total of 3 Idiots in its first two days (£121,000). By the end of the second week, MNIK became only the third Bollywood film to cross the £2 million mark in the UK, after Kabhi Alvida Naa Kehna (2006) and Veer-Zaara (2004), according to the exchange rates prevailing at their respective times of release. The film grossed a total of £2.6 million ($4,017,000) in the United Kingdom, making it the highest-grossing foreign-language film of 2010 in the UK.

My Name Is Khan debuted in USA in 120 theatres, breaking the record set by 3 Idiots (2009) which debuted in 119 theatres. The film broke the record for an opening weekend in the US, earning US$1,994,027. The film debuted at No. 13 at the American box office. By the end of the first week, the film grossed US$2,552,283, second only to 3 Idiots which had a Christmas holiday week. By the fourth week, the film earned US$3,868,891 (₹193,820,016), breaking Shah Rukh Khan's previous record set by Om Shanti Om (2007). On the 51st day of screening in the US, My Name Is Khan broke the US$4 million barrier, and became only the second Bollywood film ever to cross this mark, after 3 Idiots.

In Australia, the film earned A$39,000 (₹1610,000) on its opening day, and was ranked No. 11 in the market. By the first weekend, the film earned US$437,687, defeating the previous record set by 3 Idiots (US$350,000). In New Zealand and Fiji, the film earned NZ$13,627 on its opening day, and earned NZ$144,831 (US$100,698) in its first week. By the end of its theatrical run, the film earned NZ$232,586.

In Egypt it earned E£1,000,000. By the end of its theatrical run, the film grossed US$517,018.

My Name Is Khan also opened well in Sri Lanka, Pakistan and the Far East. The film is the highest-grossing film in Pakistan, breaking the records set by Avatar, 3 Idiots and Wanted. By its third week, MNIK became the highest-grossing Bollywood film in the Middle East, earning US$3.3 million. In South Africa, the film earned US$85,214 (₹39.28 lakh) in its opening weekend. In Malaysia, it earned RM 105,527 (US$31,106) in its opening weekend, and by the second weekend, the film had earned RM 410,864 (US$120,452). In Nigeria, the film earned an "impressive" ₦2,310,137 (US$15,362) in its opening weekend. In Ghana, the film earned GH₵10,599 (US$7,443) by the second weekend. In Indonesia, the film grew from 6 to 14 screens and saw a jump of 300 percent in week three. The film has also grossed $425,825 in 7 weeks at the Bahrain box office. The film has also grossed an impressive $55,073 in Poland in its opening weekend. The film grossed $270,698 in South Africa. In South Korea, the film grossed $2,618,866. The film also made $58,683 in Lebanon. My Name is Khan released in Hong Kong on 5 January 2012 and collected US$107,197.

=== Box office records ===
My Name Is Khan created several records, both in India and around the world. In India, the film smashed the record for a Bollywood release in the month of February, breaking the previous two-year record held by Jodhaa Akbar (2008). The film also broke the record for a Bollywood release in the first quarter of the year, breaking the previous two-year record held by Race (2008).

Overseas, it became the highest-grossing Indian film in overseas markets at the time, and the first Indian film to gross over ₹1 billion (US$21.87 million) overseas. In the UK, the film broke the four-year record of Kabhi Alvida Naa Kehna (2006), and became the highest-grossing Bollywood film in the UK. In the Middle East, it is also the highest-grossing Bollywood film.

== Awards ==
In 2017, Khan was honoured at the San Francisco Film festival for his role in the film, seven years after the release of MNIK.

== Controversies ==
=== Airport security ===
Khan has stated that due to his last name and religion, he (like Rizwan Khan) is frequently subject to excess security checks at airports. On 14 August 2009, Khan arrived in the United States to promote My Name Is Khan and to participate in South Asian-related events around the country (including Indian Independence Day). Upon arriving at Newark Airport in New Jersey, he was pulled aside by immigration officers after his name popped up on their computers, questioned for over an hour (Khan claims it was at least two hours) about the nature of his visit, and was later released. According to the Times Online, "In Delhi, Timothy J. Roemer, the American Ambassador to India, said that the embassy was trying to 'ascertain the facts of the case.' He added: 'Shah Rukh Khan, the actor and global icon, is a welcome guest in the United States.'"

Khan said he was told that it was because "they said my name was common to some name that popped up on the computer." The officials asked if he could provide names of people to vouch for him. Khan noted that he "had all the documents; they were asking me where I was going to be staying. I gave the name of FOX people with whom I had finalised a deal a few days ago as contacts." However, because they wanted to check his luggage which the airline had lost, Khan said that he "was taken to a room where many people were awaiting a secondary check on visa, most were South Asians. In fact many officers were reluctantly vouching for me, some people were asking for autographs and a Pakistani fan even said he knew who I was. But the officers said it was procedure and kept taking numbers from me."

I did feel bad for a lot of people in that room, I know because I had an escort and someone would recognise me, I will get out. Others may face more trouble ... I have extra security because of my name. I can handle this but when you have someone as respectable as an ex-president getting frisked, I am nobody (in reference to the frisking of President A. P. J. Abdul Kalam earlier in the summer).... I think it is a procedure that needs to be followed. But it is an unfortunate procedure.

— Shah Rukh Khan on being frisked at Newark Airport

While he was not allowed to use his own phone, Khan was permitted one phone call. He was thus released after officials from the Indian Consulate intervened. Civil Aviation Minister Praful Patel stated that the event will be further explored with U.S. officials. According to the BBC, "Elmer Camacho, a spokesman for the US Bureau of Customs and Border Protection, said the questioning was part of the agency's routine process to screen foreign travellers." When asked if he would demand an apology, Khan replied that he would not.

The director of My Name Is Khan, Karan Johar, was asked during an August 2009 interview with Mid-Day if the event was a publicity stunt for the film. Johar denied that it was and responded: "It's upsetting because I got a text message this morning asking me if it was a publicity plug for my movie. (Sarcastically) I mean, if I had that much power over the Homeland Security, why would I allow Shah Rukh to go through something like this? ... What's really shocking is the fact that when I was writing the film, I never thought that what happened to the protagonist of the film would happen to Shah Rukh." During a January 2010 interview, Khan referred to the implication that the event was a publicity stunt for the film as "lowdown and cheap." Christopher B. Duncan, who portrays President Obama in My Name Is Khan, also commented on the incident stating: "I was very disappointed with what SRK experienced at the airport. We're living in times where the levels of fear can sometimes spill over into paranoia. Here's a man who is an international superstar, being detained for an excessive amount of time at an airport in the United States. It had to be very upsetting for him. Imagine Oprah being detained at an airport in India for a long time, during a kind of interrogation."

In addition, the incident sparked debate and commentary among Indian politicians, actors, and others. It also led to demonstrations in India. California Governor Arnold Schwarzenegger later invited Khan to have dinner with him "in a bid to diffuse what has become a slight diplomatic row."

In another event, on 5 February 2010, while promoting My Name Is Khan on the British talk show Friday Night with Jonathan Ross, Khan claimed that female security staff at Heathrow Airport in London had printed a naked image of him taken using the newly installed body scanner that he was asked to go through. He said that he autographed it for them, though it is not clear if his comments were intended as a joke. In relation to Khan's comments, The Economic Times has raised concerns over the new body scanners and the possibilities of it being abused to distribute naked pictures of celebrities. His comments have restarted the debate in Britain over whether the new scanners violate individual privacy.

=== Shiv Sena criticism ===
After Shah Rukh Khan (who owns the Kolkata Knight Riders cricket team) criticized the fact that members of the Pakistani Cricket Team were not bought by the clubs competing in the 2010 Indian Premier League (IPL), he was condemned by Shiv Sena, a Hindu nationalist political party. There were consequent protests and demonstrations against him and demands that cinemas in India refuse to screen My Name Is Khan. Khan responded by stating, "What did I say that was wrong? All I said was that I wanted people to come to my country." Khan continued by stating that: "I have no idea what I am supposed to apologize for ... If I am in the wrong I would like to apologize but someone needs to explain to me what is wrong." He also stated that he does "not want any confrontation. I am trying to explain myself on every platform ... I have not said anything that is anti-national." Khan said that he was willing to meet with Bal Thackeray to discuss the issue.

Initially, Shiv Sena rescinded its demand to block release of My Name Is Khan after it was announced that Khan would be allowed to release it "in as many theatres" as he would like. However, on 17 February 2010, when cinemas opened for advanced bookings, individuals disguised as "cinegoers" began to attack cinemas and booking centers. Director Karan Johar and distributors met with police to ask for additional security. In response, Chief Minister of Maharashtra Ashok Chavan threatened to withdraw security cover for party leader Uddhav Thackeray. Later, some security was withdrawn and the Maharashtra government has "called in five battalions of the State Reserve Police Force to protect 63 cinemas in the city that will screen the film directed by Karan Johar from this Friday." There were multiple arrests and leave of all police officials were cancelled. The distributor, Fox Star, stated that the film would still be released on its scheduled opening date, 12 February. It opened to full cinema houses across India.

== See also ==
- List of cultural references to the September 11 attacks
- Asperger's syndrome
- Islamophobia

== Bibliography ==
- Akbar, Rais Syahrul; Sakinah, R. Myrna Nur (7 April 2021). "Islam's Racism and Discrimination in 'My Name Is Khan' Movie". Textura. 1 (1): 63–71. ISSN 2339-1820. Archived from the original on 13 July 2022.
- Anjaria, Ulka (4 March 2021). Understanding Bollywood: The Grammar of Hindi Cinema. Taylor & Francis. ISBN 978-10-00347-29-6.
- Bahroni, Imam; Muna, Izzatul (27 June 2017). "The Values of Islamic Character Education in the Film 'My Name Is Khan'". At-Ta'dib: Journal of Pesantren Education. 12 (1): 1–18. doi:10.21111/at-tadib.v12i1.907. eISSN 2503-3514. ISSN 0216-9142.
- Baker, Steven (17 April 2013). "Virtual Darshan: Social Networking and Virtual Commentaries in the Hindi Film Context". In Gokulsing, K. Moti; Dissanayake, Wimal (eds.). Routledge Handbook of Indian Cinemas. Taylor & Francis. pp. 415–426. ISBN 978-11-36772-84-9.
- Balraj, Belinda (June 2011). "'My name is Khan and I am not a Terrorist': Representation of Muslims in 'My Name Is Khan'". Journal of Language and Culture. 2 (6): 91–95. ISSN 2141-6540.
- Chatterji, Shoma (31 January 2020). Bollywood Cinema Kaleidoscope. Doshor Publication. ISBN 978-81-94442-91-2.
- Erndl, Kathleen M. (2016). "Religious and National Identity in My Name Is Khan". Journal of Religion & Film. 20 (1): 1–23. ISSN 1092-1311. Archived from the original on 21 January 2022.
- Fajriani (September 2014). "Asian Indian Muslim Negotiating for Identity in the Post 'September Eleventh' as Depicted in the Film My Name Is Khan". Rubikon: Journal of Transnational American Studies. 1 (2): 47–56. doi:10.22146/rubikon.v1i2.34223.
- Ganti, Tejaswini (7 March 2012). Producing Bollywood: Inside the Contemporary Hindi Film Industry. Duke University Press. ISBN 978-08-22352-13-6.
- Hakeem, Farrukh (2015). "Review of 'My Name Is Khan'". Societies Without Borders. 10 (1): 1–2. eISSN 1871-8868. ISSN 1872-1915.
- Johar, Karan; Saxena, Poonam (2017). An Unsuitable Boy. Penguin Random House. ISBN 978-0-670-08753-2.
- Kabir, Ananya Janahara (December 2010). "The Kashmiri as Muslim in Bollywood's 'New Kashmir films'" (PDF). Contemporary South Asia. 18 (4): 373–385. doi:10.1080/09584935.2010.526201. eISSN 1469-364X. ISSN 0958-4935. S2CID 143264233. Archived (PDF) from the original on 11 April 2023.
- Kanani, Nadia (18 August 2014). "Precarious Inclusions; Re-Imagining Disability, Race, Masculinity and Nation in My Name Is Khan". Review of Disability Studies. 10 (1–2): 40–50. ISSN 1552-9215. Archived from the original on 2 August 2021.
- Kumalasari; Derasta, Mia Ananda; Sakinah, Myrna Nur (2020). "Analisis Modalitas Dalam Ilmu Semantik Pada Film My Name Is Khan" [Analysis of Modality in the Semantic Science of My Name Is Khan]. ISLLAC: Journal of Intensive Studies on Language, Literature, Art, and Culture (in Indonesian). 4 (2): 124–131. eISSN 2597-7385. Archived from the original on 17 June 2022.
- Mehta, Monika (24 August 2012). Censorship and Sexuality in Bombay Cinema. University of Texas Press. ISBN 978-02-92742-51-2.
- Mehta, Monika (April 2016). "Performing Regulation: The Politics of Postcolonial Film Exhibition and DVD Distribution". In Merten, Kai; Krämer, Lucia (eds.). Postcolonial Studies Meets Media Studies: A Critical Encounter. Transcript Verlag. pp. 143–158. ISBN 978-3-8394-3294-5.
- Minutella, Vincenza (14 December 2017). "Globalising Bollywood: My Name Is Khan from India to Italy through Hollywood". In Cintas, Jorge Díaz; Nikolić, Kristijan (eds.). Fast-Forwarding with Audiovisual Translation. Multilingual Matters. ISBN 978-1-78309-936-8.
- Mubasyira, Mu’thia (27 December 2017). "Analisis Tokoh dan Penokohan dalam Film 'My Name Is Khan' karya Karan Johar" [Analysis of the Characters and Characterization in Karan Johar's 'My Name Is Khan']. Wacana Didaktika (in Indonesian). 5 (2): 133–142. doi:10.31102/wacanadidaktika.5.02.133-142. eISSN 2579-8464. ISSN 2337-9820. S2CID 195045913. Archived from the original on 26 July 2020.
- Nafi'ah, Jamilatun (25 March 2022). "Religious Moderation Representation in the Movie 'My Name Is Khan'". Falasafi: Jurnal Studi Keislaman. 13 (1): 11–23. doi:10.36835/falasifa.v13i01.832 (inactive 1 July 2025). eISSN 2527-8711. ISSN 2085-3815. Archived from the original on 13 July 2022.
- Neumann, Birgit (17 July 2014). "The Politics of Staging Emotions in Contemporary Bollywood Films: Aditya Chopra's Dilwale Dulhania Le Jayenge (1995) and Karan Johar's My Name is Khan (2010)". Anglia. 132 (2): 270–291. doi:10.1515/ang-2014-0030. S2CID 153685653. Archived from the original on 13 July 2022.
- Ostepeev, Lidia (September 2011). "My Name Is Khan and I'm Still Too Flamboyant". Asian Cinema. 22 (2): 442–448. doi:10.1386/AC.22.2.442_1. Archived from the original on 13 July 2022.
- Putra, Robby Aditya (July–December 2017). "Manajemen Konflik dalam Film My Name Is Khan Perspektif Konsep Dakwah" [Management of the Conflicts in My Name Is Khan from the Perspectives of Islamic Preaching Concept]. Ath-Thariq (in Indonesian). 1 (2): 159–172. doi:10.32332/ath_thariq.v1i02.1013. ISSN 2614-8439. Archived from the original on 2 June 2020.
- Palusci, Oriana; Russo, Katherine E. (2016). "My Name is Khan: Engagement, Affect and Conflict in Audiovisual Translation". Translating East and West. Tangram Edizioni Scientifiche. pp. 227–237. ISBN 978-88-64581-32-3.
- Sari, Ni Putu Ari Prasmita; Dewi, Kadek Sintya (28 February 2022). "The Family Values and Negative Stereotype Existing in Film 'My Name Is Khan'". Language and Education Journal Undiksha. 5 (1): 46–51. doi:10.23887/leju.v5i1.33592 (inactive 1 July 2025). eISSN 2613-9529. ISSN 2613-9588. Archived from the original on 18 June 2022.
- Soe, Valerie (4 November 2018). "The Asian Wave: Three Asian Male Superstars in Hollywood". In Magnan-Park, Aaron Han Joon; Tan, Gina Marchetti See Kam (eds.). The Palgrave Handbook of Asian Cinema. Palgrave Macmillan. pp. 469–488. ISBN 978-1-349-95822-1.
- Vaidya, Shubhangi (2 April 2020). "Disorder, Disability, Difference: (Re)presenting Autism in India". In Mehrotra, Nilika (ed.). Disability Studies in India: Interdisciplinary Perspectives. Springer Nature. ISBN 978-98-11526-16-9.
