= List of CID episodes: 2010–2014 =

The following is a list of episodes from the series CID aired from 2010 to 2014.

For episodes aired from 1998 to 2009, see the List of CID episodes: 1998–2009.

For episodes aired from 2015 to 2018, see the List of CID episodes: 2015–2018.

== 2010 ==
Episode	Title	Original release date
599	"The Mystery of the Shootout"	1 January 2010
Famous actor Badshaw had a fight with Kaustabh on the phone. Kaustubh soon arrived and shot at him at a party celebrating the premier of his new film, along with his bodyguards. The mystery further deepens when cops find that Kaustubh was not the only one out to kill Badshaw.
600	"Slayer Player"	8 January 2010
Intercollege basketball cup final is going on between Angel's Girl College and Martha's Girl College. In between the match, the captain of the Angel's team dies in mysterious circumstances. Forensic reports suggest that Tina died due to an electric shock. CID realizes it's not an accident but a case of murder.
601	"The Secret of the Window"	15 January 2010
Rahul has confined Simran to an apartment to hide from the relatives that she is mentally ill or else they will take over her property. One day, she sees a woman being beaten up in the opposite flat and she sends her servants to investigate, but they only find a man named Kedar and his young son. That same night, Simran witnesses the woman being murdered in that exact flat and calls the CID team. Rahul dismisses her claims as worsening insanity, but ACP Pradyuman and his team deem it their duty to check up. They discover that a woman named Chitrashee was indeed murdered in that flat. Simran suddenly dies under mysterious circumstances the very next day after Chitrashee's body is found.
602	"The Pin (Special episode)"	17 January 2010
People across the city are suddenly killing their best friends with a mysterious poison pin and then immediately committing suicide. The CID team is completely baffled as to why these innocent friends are turning into killers and taking their own lives. CID discovers that these people were blackmailed by a criminal mastermind, who has been kidnapping the killers' loved ones and holding them hostage, forcing them to carry out these gruesome murders.
603	"Poisonous Corpses"	22 January 2010
A businessman named Sushant returns home highly stressed and gets into an argument with his wife, Meera. When she enters the studyroom, she finds her husband dead. She screams and runs to call the servant for help . But she is shocked to find the servant dead as well. She immediately calls up the CID team. The cops arrive at Sushant's house only to find Meera dead as well. The cops find out that all of them have died due to poisoning. ACP Pradyuman is shockingly accused and arrested by Abhijeet.
604	"ACP Pradyuman Arrested"	29 January 2010
Abhijeet is convinced that ACP Pradyuman is hiding a terrorist at his residence. He shows a picture of ACP with a terrorist in his house and the whole team is shocked. Driven by suspicion, Abhijeet takes the ACP back to his house to investigate and the CID team finds a dead body with ACP's gun right next to it. ACP pleads innocence, and in defense, raises a gun against Abhijeet and Daya. Abhijeet accidentally shoots him. There is utter chaos and CID is all over the media.
605	"The Mystery of the Tunnels"	5 February 2010
While cleaning a municipal sewer line, a group of sewer cleaners find a severed and burnt part of human body inside it. The CID team found some more pieces in the sewer. Dr. Salunkhe says that it's a girl's dead body and a diamond is found in the skin. From the diamond, cops find out that it belongs to girl named Sarika. Meanwhile following the blueprint of the sewer, the team leads to the jungle area where they found some more pieces of human. From these parts, Dr. Salunkhe says that some spices are found both inside the burnt skin and bag carrying these parts.
606	"The Mystery of the Bank Locker ^{†}"	12 February 2010
While investigating a dead body in Madh Fort, the CID receive a phone call about a bank robbery. Upon inspecting the bank, the team finds no physical clues because the security alarms and CCTV cameras were deliberately turned off. A bank employee named Divya reveals that a worker named Mahesh is missing. When Dr. Salunkhe examines Mahesh's body, which turns out to be the corpse found at Madh Fort, he discovers a hidden spy camera inside a ring. The footage reveals Mahesh secretly recording the bank layout.
607	"The Case of the Dead Boxer"	19 February 2010
Famous boxer Vali collapses and dies during a fight against Toren. CID is called in to investigate his mysterious death. Vali's coach is convinced that Toren hit Vali purposely on the chest as he knew Vali recently had a heart attack. They discover that a hidden iron coin was placed inside the boxing glove to ensure the fatal blow.
608	"The Secret of the Killer Claws"	26 February 2010
A woman named Tamara, living by herself suddenly wakes up to a noise outside. When she checks her face, she finds blooded handprints and calls the CID. They discover no bloodstains or stray prints around the room. However, Abhijeet found a second woman's dead body hidden under Tamara's bed. Forensic analysis by Dr. Salunkhe lead the investigation in finding out that deceased woman used to work in a kid nursery.
609	"A Red Holi"	5 March 2010
Vijay and his wife attend a festive Holi celebration hosted by his boss Sahil and his wife Mehek. Shortly into the festivities, Vijay suddenly collapses and dies. The guests at the party panic and try to wake Vijay up, but they find another dead body of the party decorator in the water tank. As the CID team arrives and begins investigating the crime scene, a group of armed goons invades the party. They hold the whole team, the host Sahil and the innocent guests hostage, knowing that Sahil has 10 crore with him. They blackmailed the cops that they will shoot the innocent people in the party, but cleverly Fredricks asks permission to continue with the investigation.
610	"The Murder Mystery at the Traffic Light"	12 March 2010
A girl is found murdered in a car at a traffic stop. The killer was nowhere to be seen. The CID identify the victim as Sheetal, who lives as a paying guest with no immediate family. An official from the Witness Protection Department intercepts the team to reveal her real identity as Menaka. She and her friend were the eyewitnesses to a high-profile murder outside a bar. The search for the killer leads the CID to a cruise ship.
611	"Senior Inspector Abhijeet"	19 March 2010
While dining at a restaurant, Daya introduces Abhijeet to his close friend Purvi and her family. In a shocking turn of events, Purvi's family accuses Abhijeet of being "Arvind" who murdered Purvi's elder brother 15 years ago. Because the alleged murder happened right before Abhijeet lost his memory and joined the CID bureau, he cannot confirm his innocence. To worsen matters, Purvi’s younger brother is found murdered shortly after claiming he had concrete proof against Abhijeet. While Abhijeet claims innocence, ACP still conduct forensic examination. Later, Abhijeet is proved innocent but he decides to resign from his job, consumed by suspicion by own team members.
612	"Manali Murder"	26 March 2010
A Mumbai woman’s body is found buried deep in the snow in Manali. The CID team is called in to investigate. Her name is Meenal which was identified by the ring on her finger and she has been strangulated to death. The CID team finds out that Meenal stayed in a hotel in Manali and also had an item in her pocket that comes from Shimla. Meenal's sister revealed that Meenal was to get married in a couple of months to Karan. CID investigates and finds out that Meenal was last seen in Shimla with a boy and someone had paid to keep an eye on Meenal. To the shock of CID, the boy turns out to be her fiancé Karan. Before CID can ask him, someone shot him dead while he was on the run.
613	"Cricket Converted Into Crime"	2 April 2010
A group of kids playing cricket in a residential colony accidentally hits a ball through the window of a strict neighbour named Sudhir. Kids go to his house but it is locked and nobody replies. Kids somehow manage to get inside the house and are shocked to see Sudhir lying dead on the floor and the ball is lying near him.The terrified children believe their ball killed him. CID comes and finds the wound of the ball hit on Sudhir's head. Dr. Salunkhe tells cops that Sudhir died of poison too. Cops are confused that from where the poison came. They go to Sudhir's house to look for poison but there is no poison.
614	"Crime On A Roof"	9 April 2010
Sanjay, a businessman is killed while giving a speech during a major launch party for a company product at a resort terrace. The CID is called in and their investigation reveals that a resort staff member named Payal altered the venue setup at the last second so that the killer can kill Sanjay at ease. Before the team can interrogate her, Payal boards a flight to escape but is mysteriously poisoned mid-air right in front of Daya and Abhijeet. Investigation reveals that Sanjay's murder was planned by his ex-wife Roma, but executed by his step-brother Akshat to avenge his humiliation and disinheritance after Roma backed out at the last minute.
615	"Prisoner Knows The Mystery"	16 April 2010
A man dies when he opens a gift box that was sent to him. Cops found him lying dead on the floor with his face swollen and a broken jar lying beside him. Salunkhe reveals that Dharmesh dies of honey bee bite as he was allergic to it and also the broken jar had honey bees inside it. Cops are stunned that why somebody will send honey bee as a gift. Cops don't get any bank account or credit card or any identity clue of Dharmesh. The plant nursery owner makes the sketch of the man who bought honey bees from him. Cops check the sketch in the data and are shocked to know that the man is Virender, a prisoner who is still in jail.
616	"The Highway of the Death"	23 April 2010
A couple goes to the petrol station to fill fuel in their car and the petrol station attendant starts to scream saying there is a dead body in the car. On the arrival of CID, the couple say that the man had come running from the forest and asked lift from the couple. Forensic report reveals that the man had ingested tiny glass particles that caused internal bleeding and resulted in his death.
617	"Double Murders"	30 April 2010
A woman goes missing in the locked room of the resort during her anniversary celebration. As CID start the investigation they found two dead bodies in two different locked rooms of the resort.
618	"The Killer Wall"	7 May 2010
A man named Saurabh approaches the CID team after his fiancée Snigdha, goes missing before their engagement day. She was an employee at a well-known fashion house. The CID team discovers Snigdha's body has been hidden and cemented completely inside the warehouse wall. Dr. Salunkhe’s forensic report reveals that Snigdha was poisoned roughly 24 hours before being buried. Initial suspicion falls on an employee named Siddharth. However, as the team tracks him down, a major twist reveals that Siddharth is actually an undercover CID officer working on a massive drug-smuggling racket operating inside the fashion house.
619	"The Blessings of Death"	14 May 2010
A couple is getting married but when the groom puts vermillion in her forehead, she suddenly dies. When the CID team begins their initial investigation, the shocked groom crying over her dead body, suddenly collapses and dies right in front of them. Initial suspicion falls on the bride's younger's sister's boyfriend Rahul who wanted to take revenge from the family. Newly appointed officer Kajal faces an emotional test as she might have to arrest her own brother Rahul. Ultimately, Rahul is found innocent when forensic evidence reveals that both deaths were caused by a lethal poison mixed into the sindoor.
620	"The Case of Selective Amnesia"	21 May 2010
A dazed, blood-drenched young man holding a bloodied knife collapses after stopping a driving couple's car. Forensic analysis reveals that the knife carries blood samples from three different individuals. When the CID team interrogates him, doctors mentioned the suspect Abhimanyu is suffering from Selective Amnesia. He claims that he was at his own birthday party last night and doesn't remember what happened thereafter.
621	"The Secret of the Killer Room"	22 May 2010
A locked room of a 100-year-old heritage house is opened up after 50 years and a skeleton is found on a chair which isn't 50 years old. The titanium rod inside fake thumb leads to a christmas party happened 2 years ago.
622	"The Danger of Chemical Bomb"	28 May 2010
A suspicious truck recklessly rams through a police security barricade. The CID officers discovered the driver died due to a violent crash and a dangerous nuclear chemical is present inside a cylinder. A rogue scientist named Kancha Cheena stole three identical chemical cylinders from a high-security nuclear research facility two years prior before mysteriously vanishing. Investigation take a roadblock as he died six months ago during a police encounter. The CID team must race against time to track down the remaining stolen nuclear chemical cylinders to prevent a city-wide catastrophe.
623	"Suicide or Murder"	29 May 2010
A man plays a prank on his wife by calling her up and asking her to come back home immediately or else he will kill himself. When she comes home, he is found dead. The question arises whether he committed suicide or was murdered.
624	"Kidnap"	4 June 2010
A film star is kidnapped. Initial notion that the kidnapping was a publicity stunt is proven false when the producers get a real threat note.
625	"One Murder Two Times"	5 June 2010
A maid finds it odd when her owner does not open the door in the morning for two consecutive days and there is a foul odor near the entrance.
626	"Abhijeet in Coma"	11 June 2010
Inspector Abhijeet is shot and is admitted to the ICU where he meets a rather panic Dr Ketkar who is about to perform a surgery on a case witness just before he is to be taken to the court.
627	"Heart Attack Killer"	12 June 2010
A man, while chasing a bank robber, dies of a heart attack. Upon investigation, it is revealed that the heart attack was planned.
628	"Human Bomb"	18 June 2010
A man fitted with bomb rings the bell of a house and as soon as the door opens, he explodes.
629	"The Corpse in the Sea"	19 June 2010
Fishermen find a dead body in an upturned boat in the sea.
630	"The Case of the Anonymous Killer ^{†}"	25 June 2010
A man complains of a death threat when his dog is found dead with a note.
631	"The Case of the Kidnapped Child"	26 June 2010
Business tycoon Bhuvan and Nalini's son Chetan was kidnapped two decades ago and has now come back to his family. However, during a party to celebrate his return, Chetan is killed.
632	"The Jump of Death"	2 July 2010
A man falls from a highrise hotel to his death.
633	"Blood Stains in Cloth"	3 July 2010
A man goes to collect his clothes from a laundry shop and is shocked to discover that his clothes are stained in blood.
634	"CID Under Fire"	9 July 2010
The CID team is working on a crime scene of a victim of serial killing.
635	"Killer Player"	10 July 2010
As a couple is jogging in a park, they witness a man with a javelin pierced through his chest. Before he can tell them anything about the attack, he collapses and dies.
636	"The Case of the Lift Murder"	16 July 2010
A lift in a building gets stuck. The maintenance man is called, and a dead body is found stuck between the lift ropes.
637	"The Game of Bomb"	17 July 2010
An abandoned suitcase is found in a house. As panic ensues, the bomb squad is called in to scan the suitcase that was nothing but a hoax with a threat note of a real bomb.
638	"The Case of the Half Corpse"	23 July 2010
The lower half of a dead body is found on a deserted beach.
639	"Kissa Khali Kabar Ka"	24 July 2010
A woman informs the CID about another woman's death.
640	"The Mystery of the Sword"	30 July 2010
The accidental death of a man during a fight leads the team of CID to discover another body buried in the ground with a knife popping out of it.
641	"Once Upon a Time in Mumbai"	31 July 2010
In this special episode of CID Emraan Hashmi and Prachi Desai are being threatened by a crazy fan.
642	"Girl Found in a Coffin"	6 August 2010
An archaeology group uncovering a newly discovered heritage site discovers a woman's body splashed in blood hidden inside a tomb. The CID team is called in assuming it is a murder, but they realize the woman is alive. The blood actually belongs to another victim whose body is missing. The woman has lost her memory due to a heavy blow to her head but manages to faintly recall witnessing a murder. The CID team must race to protect this eyewitness and catch a serial killer.
643	"Mumbai Darshan Murders"	7 August 2010
A woman is killed while travelling on a Mumbai darshan bus.
644	"The Mystery of the Five Skeletons"	13 August 2010
A new couple moves into a house and discovers a pile of human bones hidden under a windowsill. Dr. Salunkhe’s forensic team discovers a mix of real and fake bones. The real pieces combine to form a full skeleton composed of body parts from five different individuals. Forensic investigation reveals that the victims were all close friends of Dr. Salunkhe, revealing that the killer is sending a targeted message to make him the final target.
645	"CID Against Country Traitors"	14 August 2010
A young man is found murdered in Mumbai, and a recent photograph of him at the Red Fort is discovered. This leads the CID team to travel to Delhi to investigate. Their search uncovers a shocking fake currency racket that the murdered man was involved in. The case escalates when another dead body is discovered hidden in a Delhi farmhouse, pushing the team to track down the dangerous mastermind behind the conspiracy.
646	"The Case of the Dead Body in the Well"	20 August 2010
A girl named Alisha was reported missing and is found dead in a well with her body brutally cut.
647	"The Secret of the Diamond"	21 August 2010
Owner of Travis Security Agency, Shekhar has a project to transfer diamonds worth millions to the USA but before he could do that, the diamonds are stolen.
648	"The Case of the Man-Eater"	27 August 2010
A human flesh-eating man is caught by the CID for the murder of a girl. When the police investigate his hideout, though, they find skeletons of many bodies, and learn that someone has been providing him with the dead bodies.
649	"The Case of the Anonymous Child"	28 August 2010
A woman is taking her child for a morning walk. After a while, the child is found abandoned and the woman is found dead.
650	"The Mystery of the Killer Robber"	3 September 2010
A bank robbery goes wrong when the manager and an unknown man are found dead.
651	"Dowry Death"	4 September 2010
The team of CID is approached by the parents of a girl named Trupti. They inform them that Trupti had been missing for the last two days and that both her in-laws and her husband had no knowledge about it either.
652	"The Mystery of the Coffin Guard"	10 September 2010
When a group of property dealers decide to sell an old, abandoned inn they are suddenly shot by mysterious assailants. One of them survives and calls CID for help. While searching the inn, they find an empty coffin which had a dead body in it.
653	"The Case of the Blind Witness"	11 September 2010
The team of CID, while investigating the murder of a man who was found in the compound of a building, comes across a blind woman who claims to be present at the time of the murder.
654	"The Case of Daya and Little Detectives"	17 September 2010
A group of children are playing outside their colony at night, and they decide to enter an abandoned house, just then they witness a man killing someone.
655	"The Secret of the Ghost Girl"	18 September 2010
A girl called Kashish believes she saw a ghost, a girl who is begging her to find her murderer.
656	"Last Challenge Part I"	24 September 2010
CID team finds the body of a man who had been murdered. Next to his body, they find a CD that has footage of Sonali being kidnapped.
657	"Last Challenge Part II"	25 September 2010
While cops are searching for Sonali and Tarika, Abhijit and Tasha are almost killed when they are locked in a room with poisonous gas. In the meantime, a woman is found dead, and her husband is severely injured.
658	"Last Challenge Part III"	1 October 2010
A father, thinking that his daughter who had been missing is now dead, receives her picture and realizes that she was not killed but kidnapped. CID Inspector Kajal receives a call that her brother is injured and she is kidnapped.
659	"Last Challenge Part IV"	2 October 2010
A few days after a visit to his dentist a man dies mysteriously. While trying to search for Kajal, Inspector Fredricks is kidnapped, and Vivek fails to save him.
660	"Last Challenge Part V"	8 October 2010
The burnt corpse that the cops were fearing was Freddy, turns out to be a false alarm.
661	"Last Challenge VI"	9 October 2010
Daya escapes a bomb blast in a tunnel. CID, meanwhile, is called to investigate the mysterious death of a woman.
662	"Last Challenge Part VII"	15 October 2010
The CID team finds Dr. Salunkhe's car on the road, but they notice that Dr. Salunkhe is missing.
663	"Last Challenge Part VIII"	16 October 2010
The Mastermind successfully traps ACP, Abhijit and Daya into his web.
664	"Last Challenge Part IX"	17 October 2010
HD traps the CID team in a cottage and blasts it and escapes to Paris. The CID team manage to escape and also find the identity of HD ( Herpes Dongara ).
665	"The Case of the Lady in Red"	22 October 2010
A couple, Ishaan and Prishita hosts a party in their house and Ishaan's cousin brother becomes jealous and angry as Ishaan got all the money and a huge house where as he did not.
666	"Subway Murder"	23 October 2010
A janitor in Andheri station finds a dead and informs CID of the same.
667	"The Game of Life and Death"	29 October 2010
Sangraam, a wrestler rushes back home to find his wife burned to death.
668	"The Case of the Predictions"	30 October 2010
CID reaches a mall where a man was found dead.
669	"CID's War With Child Labor"	5 November 2010
Three children are seen fleeing from their captor. Next day CID team is called to a hospital, where the doctor informs them about them.
670	"The Tie of Blood"	6 November 2010
Some children playing in the evening see a man, Abhimanyu holding a knife over his sister's dead body.
671	"The Case of the Fake Notes"	12 November 2010
In a jungle, a woman, who is running away from someone is killed in an accident by a truck. Elsewhere, ACP Pradyuman scolds CID Inspector Tasha for using fake currency to shop at a mall. After she reveals that Inspector Kajal gave her the money, they go to Kaajal's house but find a dead body supposedly belonging to her.
672	"Asylum Murder"	13 November 2010
In a prison cell, one of the prisoners killed another one and escaped from the prison.
673	"The Mysterious Killer"	19 November 2010
A couple, Devyani and Veer are on their way to collect some money from Veer's friend, Prabhaat. Prabhat is then found dead in a closed room, with no wounds on him and door and windows completely shut.
674	"Do Qatil Ki Paheli"	20 November 2010
Two guards come across a dead body of an old man and CID is called to investigate.
675	"The Secret of the Unknown Wife"	26 November 2010
Daya is on a date with his girlfriend and he proposes to her, instead of being happy she can be seen worried and want to tell something to Daya, but he has to rush to work for a new case.
676	"The Secret of Daya's Bride"	27 November 2010
The CID team is shocked to find out that Daya is going to marry a girl with criminal ties.
677	"Abhijeet in Jail ^{^}"	3 December 2010
A man’s bag, containing a diamond worth 3 crore rupees, is stolen from a train platform and CID are called to investigate. After Abhijeet arrests the criminal, he is accused of fatally shooting him. K.D. Pathak of Adaalat fights his case.
678	"Tasha in Danger"	4 December 2010
Yogesh, an experienced paraglider, is murdered while at a paragliding site with his girlfriend. CID Inspector Tasha dies in a scuffle between her and the culprit.
679	"The Case of the Double Murder"	10 December 2010
A woman wakes up at night to find blood on her husband’s shirt.
680	"The Secret of the Blood Drinker Killer"	11 December 2010
A man wakes up to find, to his shock, his mouth and teeth covered in blood, with no memory of the last night.
681	"The Case of the 150-Year-Old Corpse"	17 December 2010
The biology lab of a college has organized the arrival of new equipment and specimens. But all hell breaks loose when one skeleton in a set of replicas turns out to be a real one.
682	"Raaz Beech Restaurant Mein Khoon Ka"	18 December 2010
Deepak and his wife Kavita are having soup in a restaurant, when Deepak suddenly begins choking and dies.
683	"The Secret of Abhijeet's Past Part I"	24 December 2010
On the same night, the CID team discovers one unknown dead body on a train and another at the railway station.
684	"The Secret of Abhijeet's Past Part II"	25 December 2010
A rich family is hosting the engagement of their youngest daughter, but are afraid, as their mansion is said to be a cursed.
685	"The Secret of Abhijeet's Past Part III"	31 December 2010
Someone calls CID anonymously reporting a murder in a flat.

^{†} Denotes crossover with Aahat
^{^} Denotes crossover with Adaalat

== 2011 ==
Episode	Title	Original release date
686	"The Secret of Abhijeet's Past Part IV"	1 January 2011
A young man named Arjun attacks a group of youngsters playing basketball on a beach and kills himself in the ensuing conflict. Then, a laborer is pushed off a building to his death.
687	"The Secret of Abhijeet's Past Part V"	7 January 2011
The head of a rich industrialist family, Rohan, is found murdered at a camp where he was celebrating his 70th birthday.
688	"The Secret of Abhijeet's Past Part VI"	8 January 2011
A man is found dead, frozen in the ice at an ice-manufacturing factory.
689	"The Secret of Abhijeet's Past Part VII"	14 January 2011
Abhijit is with Maya in the Hotel. While returning with her, he finds a dead body in his car.
690	"The Secret of Abhijeet's Past Part VIII"	15 January 2011
After an argument ensues between a referee and a player during a tennis match between two players collapses, both players suddenly collapse one after the other.
691	"The Secret of Abhijeet's Past Part IX"	21 January 2011
Abhijeet arrives with Amit and Maya. They hold the station hostage and Abhijeet demands that CID free two criminals who have to be hanged that day.
692	"The Secret of Abhijeet's Past Part X"	22 January 2011
Abhijeet, in a maddened state, shoots ACP Pradyuman and almost kills Daya, before Maya intervenes and takes him away. ACP reveals that the bullet shot by Abhijeet was fake.
693	"Killer Road"	28 January 2011
There is a particular road in a town, a deserted shortcut to the highway, on which accidents and murders happen in the night between 7PM and 9PM.
694	"Dead Killer"	29 January 2011
A girl's dead body cut in pieces is found in a park. The team identifies the victim as a dance school teacher named Natasha. Autopsy reveals that she was tied, tortured and then stabbed to death. Eventually, Dr. Salunkhe extracts a fingerprint from Natasha's fingernail. However, it matched with a man named Mangesh, who died 10 years ago.
695	"The Case of the Hanging Bodies"	4 February 2011
Anuj enters Kiran's house and tells that he cannot marry her as he has married another woman, shattering the family. The next day, Kiran and her family are found hanging in a tree. Meanwhile, Kiran's uncle claims to CID that her family had a 20-year-old curse.
696	"The Secret of the Girl in the Painting"	5 February 2011
A man, Abhinav, buys a painting from a poor artist. The painting is of a beautiful young woman who the artist claims was his wife, who passed away.
697	"The Mystery of the Neighbour’s Death"	11 February 2011
Sameer hears an argument between Ravi and Jaya, a couple who live next door to him. He hears that Ravi is going to kill Jaya and gathers all the neighbors to save her, but it turns out she is alright.
698	"Blackmail Murder"	12 February 2011
Vishaakha is a regular girl-next-door celebrating Valentine’s Day with her fiancé Rishabh. But everything changes when she boards a bus on her usual route, finding a gun and a cellphone.
699	"The Case of the Man Found Dead in a Stampede"	18 February 2011
Abhijit receives a call from an informant about the most wanted criminal in Mumbai, Kedaar, being spotted in the city, watching a premiere inside a theatre. The cops get hold of him. Meanwhile, they investigate a man who supposedly died from a stampede caused by the criminal, but it is revealed that he died of poison.
700	"The Case of the Predictions"	19 February 2011
A doctor is preparing to leave for his work, having his breakfast and reading the newspaper. But in that very newspaper, he is appalled to find his own obituary.
701	"Claustrophobia"	25 February 2011
A judge who happens to be ACP Pradyuman's childhood friend, is shocked to learn that his grandson has been kidnapped.
702	"Waqt Ki Paheli"	26 February 2011
A girl calls the police saying she is in danger. When they reach the flat, she seemed to be missing. Later the body is found on the terrace.
703	"The Secret of the Fish"	4 March 2011
With the help of an informant, the CID catches a man with a really expensive revolver hidden in a fish.
704	"The Secret of the Missing Couple"	5 March 2011
A husband who is spying on his wife, sets up a meeting between his wife and her lover. He places CCTV cameras inside the hotel room and keeps an eye on them.
705	"The Secret of the Magic Cannon"	11 March 2011
Vetaal the famous magician is performing for a packed hall. He enters into a cannon which shoots and the first time he is unhurt, but the second time he is missing. C.I.D team find out that the DNA sample of the burnt body of a man who was found a few kilometers away from the auditorium belongs to the magician.
706	"The Book of Blood"	12 March 2011
A writer is horrified when 3 murders take place in the city, which are identical to those he has written about in his book.
707	"Terror Threat in Pune"	18 March 2011
With an experimental device, the CID catches a man with traces of RDX on him.
708	"The Case of the Mysterious Tattoo"	19 March 2011
A dead body found with a half-torn ticket from her pocket, a ticket to a museum.
709	"Mystery of the Ellora Caves"	25 March 2011
During a tourist visit to Ellora Caves, one guide acts strange. CID, meanwhile, receives a mysterious call from an unknown number from Aurangabad. Investigations leads them to a paper factory.
710	"The Secret of the Missing Girl"	26 March 2011
A murder beside a road gets CID attention.
711	"The Serial Killer in Kolhapur"	1 April 2011
Multiple people across the city are found dead in a mysterious way.
712	"The Secret of the Palace of Kolhapur"	2 April 2011
A death at a heritage hotel shocks everyone.
713	"Murder in Sleep"	8 April 2011
A mystery involving a woman who wakes up with a bloodstained knife next to her in the jungle.
714	"Khooni Jaal"	9 April 2011
A drunken man stumbles upon a dead body at the beach.
715	"Locked Room"	15 April 2011
There seems to be a secret rumored haunted room. Whoever goes in, never comes out.
716	"Spike in Head"	16 April 2011
A regular day turns ominous when a girl with a spike going through her head rushes to the mall.
717	"Dhoom Series: Bus Hijack"	22 April 2011
A bus with 15 passengers is taken hostage and is used to crush everything that comes in the way. CID is then called by someone who threatens to blast the bomb planted in the bus if they intervene.
718	"Dhoom Series: Fire"	23 April 2011
A reputed college is having their annual festival, which includes a rain dance. Things go well until a fire breaks out in the rain dance, injuring and burning students to death.
719	"Dhoom Series: Bike Robbers"	29 April 2011
A money truck is robbed by some bikers.
720	"Dhoom Series: The Secret of the Blue Print"	30 April 2011
Two construction workers eve drop on some goons threatening a scientist.
721	"Dhoom Series: Under Water Action"	6 May 2011
A group of boys gone for scuba diving find a dead body of a scuba diver.
722	"Dhoom Series: Building Robbery"	7 May 2011
The night before the auction, two thieves break into the vault room and steal the jewels.
723	"Ragini MMS"	13 May 2011
A serial killer is making celebrities his target, that to on the live television. No one knows, no clue, no marks in the crime scene. This time his target is Ekta Kapoor, who came to the show to talk about her upcoming movie Ragini MMS. As expected Ekta gets attacked in the show, she survived the killer attack. Ekta has recorded something in her cell phone which leads the cops to find this killer.
724	"The Case of the Double Murder"	14 May 2011
Rahul, who is jogging in the park with his friend, collapses while exercising and dies.
725	"CID in Danger"	20 May 2011
A man decides to take revenge on ACP Pradyuman.
726	"The Secret of the Skeleton"	21 May 2011
Ayesha and Shaurya receive a house in inheritance from a distant relative whom they are not so familiar with. After entering the house, Ayesha discovers bones in the house.
727	"Missing Bullet"	27 May 2011
A wealthy businessman Dhanraj was on his way to put his diamonds in a safe but before he could do that, the diamonds are stolen, and he is shot dead in the parking lot.
728	"The Secret of the Severed Legs"	28 May 2011
A girl and her boyfriend find a shoe with the feet cut and soaked in blood.
729	"The Mysterious Flute"	3 June 2011
A newly made bridge is made on the highway and is the recipient of the sound of a flute and whoever listens to the flute, he/she is never found again.
730	"The Secret of the Necklace Message"	4 June 2011
Seven people arrive at an isolated spot as they receive an SMS from the same number. Meanwhile, a professor is killed in the washroom of an airport when he is about to leave the country.
731	"The Case of CID and Little Detectives"	10 June 2011
Kids and teachers in a school become hostage to terrorists but somehow manage to call CID for help.
732	"The Secret of the Wrist Band Killer"	11 June 2011
Three children spot a girl in danger and call CID. Upon interrogation, it is found that the girl was missing and they also find the dead body of Akhil.
733	"Ghost Killer"	17 June 2011
Nihaal comes to spend quality time with his family for the weekend to a mansion, but their car breaks down in the middle of the road. A man helps them get to their destination. The next morning, Nihaal's sister Ria is found dead in her room.
734	"The Secret of the Death of the Killer"	18 June 2011
Abhijeet and Daya are undercover to catch a culprit named Babu who is involved in a drug-smuggling racket. Babu is shot in the chase and the two cops only find a plain paper.
735	"Dhobi Ghat"	24 June 2011
A girl named Jiya is about to get married. When an unknown dress that does not belong to Jiya is returned from the laundry, it is revealed that the worker who dyed the dress is murdered.
736	"Victoria Murder"	25 June 2011
Three youngsters find a dead body lying at Marine Drive. The cut marks on the body match with three other deaths in a month.
737	"The Mystery of the Killer Kidnapper"	1 July 2011
Shobhit is walking on a lonely road with a suitcase and fights two men, killing one of them. When he is arrested, he reveals that his son has been kidnapped, and CID finds his dead body in Shobhit's house.
738	"Raaz Khooni Chetavani Ka"	2 July 2011
Manu's servant is killed in his house. Upon interrogation, he reveals that he was asleep when someone sneaked into the house and killed him leaving a threat message to kill Manu.
739	"Qatl Ka Raaz Mare Hue Qatil Ke Pass"	8 July 2011
Gayatri, a widow hears a whistle in a mall and follows it but goes into a shock after seeing the man. Later, a thief enters her room, and she shoots him. CID follow the blood trail only to find his dead body a couple of meters away.
740	"CID in Brink of Death"	9 July 2011
CID are waiting for their informant and as soon as he arrives, he dies after coming in contact with lightning. Upon investigation, it is found out that the informant was killed deliberately.
741	"The Case of the Dead Body in AC Duct"	15 July 2011
A strong stench smell is found in Kashyap's office so the staff searches for the source and discovers blood in Mr. Kashyap's cabin.CID was called and they found his dead body hidden inside the AC duct. Upon deeper investigation, cops found some photographs of Kashyap with another girl Teena and a private detective was hired by his wife Mitali.
742	"Murder in DVD"	16 July 2011
While watching a horror movie, Sid and Tanya see a real footage of a girl being shot dead. The girl is no other than Meenakshi, Tanya's elder sister ; who had mysteriously gone missing two years back. With some intelligent detection CID manages to find the house where Meenakshi was shot, and they find a female skeleton. But the case turns upside down when Salunkhe tells them that the skeleton isn't of Meenakshi but of someone else.
743	"Peephole Murder"	22 July 2011
On the night of Ritwik's birthday party, Maya sees Ritwik in an argument with a girl. Later in the night, she sees Ritwik's dead body in a room, but later Ritwik is found alive. Everyone thinks she is crazy and mentally ill but she is sure she has seen a murder and she runs to CID for help. As the cops follow the case, they realize that a murder has happened indeed , even though not of Ritwik.
744	"Stunt Man Murder"	23 July 2011
During a karate rehearsal, a man starts fighting with Sameer. A man's body burning is found in the corridor and later Sameer is found dead. The investigation takes a shocking turn when Dr. Salunkhe reveals that the burning man was already murdered three days ago.
745	"Raaz Qatil Hatyaar Ka"	29 July 2011
Real estate agent Nitin is found dead in the house he has come to deal for. Nitin was killed in a very strange manner where his jugular vein has been cut and the flesh of that portion was lying near the dead body. Dr. Salunkhe checks the body and he also doesnt understand that how the man died. He later tells that a dog has killed him.
746	"Crimes of Passion"	30 July 2011
Pia, the upcoming actress is kidnapped and her family doubts cameraman Devesh is the culprit. Devesh gave the CID an escape and ran with unconscious Pia. He entered the makeshift lift of an under-construction building but lift wire broke, crashed killing both of them. But Dr. Salunkhe confirms that girl was not Pia but someone else.
747	"The Case of the Missing Girl"	5 August 2011
During Payal's farewell party, her friend Karan is worried. He sees Payal crying while talking to Manish and is furious at Manish. Next day Payal is found dead in Karan's car and Karan pleads innocence.
748	"X-Ray Murder"	6 August 2011
A radiology staff Rohan is stabbed to death during a false fire alarm in a hospital.
749	"Independence Day Special Part I"	12 August 2011
Inspector Vivek is on a special mission to find the whereabouts of a convicted terrorist Dhantelota who is planning an attack on Independence day. After he goes missing, a victim, meanwhile, asks CID for help.
750	"Independence Day Special Part II"	13 August 2011
ACP Pradyuman and Fredricks are the only two officers left from the team of CID after all the other members go missing.
751	"Daya The Killer"	19 August 2011
Judges of a food competition show are poisoned but doctors manage to save their lives. Daya, who enters the show undercover, is accused of killing the show's organizer, Sanket.
752	"The Case of the Highway Robbery"	20 August 2011
Jigar, a hot-tempered guy, goes on a road trip with his friends and they all go missing. Investigations lead CID to a village nearby where they find Jigar's car with bloodstains.
753	"The Case of the Double Murder"	26 August 2011
CID is investigating a double homicide case where women are mysteriously killed and one of them was having an illicit relationship with a married man.
754	"The Plan"	27 August 2011
Mitali, a famous model, kills a man Ravi on a busy street and then she disappears.
755	"CID in Goa Part I"	2 September 2011
Vijay, who is posted in Goa as a police officer, is killed while following the case of Carlos, a notorious drug mafioso.
756	"CID in Goa Part II"	3 September 2011
After Abhijeet falls off a cliff, he is shown to have lost his memory and made to believe by the mafia that he is Carlos.
757	"Ganesh Chaturthi"	9 September 2011
Yaksh, a young businessman dies in a bomb blast in his office on the eve of Ganesh Chaturthi.
758	"Pen Drive"	10 September 2011
Shalini has been abducted by a group of gangsters who want to know the whereabouts of a pen drive.
759	"Bandra Fair Murder"	16 September 2011
A small-time thief, Kimmi, is shot on the ferry wheel in the Bandra fair.
760	"The Doll House"	17 September 2011
Meera receives a doll via courier that her father has ordered for her birthday. The doll breaks and it is revealed that it has actual human eyes.
761	"Impossible Series: Dry Ice"	23 September 2011
Mahinder is found dead in the basement of his ice cream parlour with a wound on the back of his head and burnt hands.
762	"Impossible Series: Poisonous Hair"	24 September 2011
Two dead bodies are found. One in the abandoned car and other near the highway.
763	"Impossible Series: Fire"	30 September 2011
Sobha an old lady, who was an eyewitness to a murder, burns to ashes but the chair on which she was sitting is intact. The second eye witness too dies with green blood spilling out of his nose, eyes and ears.
764	"Impossible Series: Pigeon"	1 October 2011
A father receives a ransom call about his son but thinks it is a prank as his son is in front of his eyes. The next day his son, Joy, is found dead in his room.
765	"Ravan Dehan Part I"	7 October 2011
A headless body is found thrown in the jungle with an unused cinema hall theatre ticket.
766	"Ravan Dehan Part II"	8 October 2011
CID cracks the motive and the pattern behind all the gruesome murders that are happening.
767	"The Photograph"	14 October 2011
A man is murdered, and his body is discovered in antique furniture. CID discovers a photograph in his body with a plea to save someone holding the secret to another murder.
768	"Bank Robbery"	15 October 2011
An attempted robbery of a jewelry shop goes haywire when the security guard tries to stop it and is killed. However, the robbers were carrying fake guns, and they're also found dead
769	"Silent Killer"	21 October 2011
Five girls are playing hide and seek at a bungalow when a killer enters the house and kills four of them brutally. While investigating, CID learns of an organ trafficking racket behind these murders as they find more dead bodies buried with their vital organs missing.
770	"The Case of the Accused Doctor"	22 October 2011
A body of a young woman mysteriously disappears from Forensic Laboratory and it is found out that Dr Salunkhe had kept quiet about it and lied to the CID team.
771	"Diwali Special"	28 October 2011
On Diwali night, Rhea and Tina, two cousins decide to play a joke on the assistant director. Rhea calls him up and says that she knows what he has done and she will tell the cops.
772	"Target in Kolkata - Daya"	29 October 2011
Daya is chased by some goons and is in bad shape in Kolkata.
773	"The Bride's Necklace"	4 November 2011
A woman shows up at a big jewellery store with a bag of jewels that she wants to sell desperately. During the checking of jewels for authenticity, they find a patch of blood on its back.
774	"Marriage Murder"	5 November 2011
A tensed Deepak faints during the rituals of his marriage and is found dead when his would-be wife Tanya had come out of the room.
775	"Blood Theme Series: Bleeding to Death"	11 November 2011
A girl- Shruti dies in front of many people in a disco.
776	"Blood Theme Series: Copy Cat"	12 November 2011
A woman’s body is found on the outskirts of the city.
777	"Blood Theme Series: Bloodless Body"	18 November 2011
A corpse is found with all of its blood sucked out.
778	"Blood Theme Series: Blood Dripping Ceiling"	19 November 2011
A real estate agent named Palaash gives a flat in a renovated building to his friends, Aarav and Mihika, a newly married couple. But on the first night of their stay, the couple discovers a leaking ceiling in the flat.
779	"Misleading Clues"	25 November 2011
A local businessman staying in a hotel room is murdered brutally.
780	"Baby Clue"	26 November 2011
The dead body of a woman is found in the road near a jungle, with her face completely destroyed.
781	"Dirty Picture"	2 December 2011
On the sets of The Dirty Picture an actress dies because of a fall.
782	"Dart Murder"	3 December 2011
Nitin reaches a club and meets a man named Gattu. When Nitin returns home he finds his father dead. CID find a dart near the collar bone as the murder weapon.
783	"Helpless Girl"	9 December 2011
CID find a girl running from a person who claims to be her father. They save girl from the man and the girl tells them that she has seen a dead body, but she will only reveal everything if they kidnap a boy.
784	"Badli Laash Ka Rahasya"	10 December 2011
Girish's wife comes crying to CID fearing for his life from Rakesh who was sent to jail because of his testimony. CID manage to catch Rakesh and find Girish's dead body along with another man's dead body at the same place.
785	"Happy Man Suicide"	16 December 2011
Mohit, who won 50 lakh rupees, has a stone thrown at his house with a message attached. That night, he falls from his balcony of his apartment and dies.
786	"Magic Room Murder"	17 December 2011
A wealthy couple have bought the controversial and haunted haveli of a notorious magician of the 1930s and plan to turn it into a heritage hotel. Meanwhile, they learn about stories of the magician's 'magic room', from where people go missing.
787	"Merry Christmas"	23 December 2011
Kashyap, a big business tycoon is celebrating his daughter Shimona’s 20th birthday with a Christmas-themed party. But this happy celebration turns sour as someone from Kashyap’s past begins blackmailing and threatening him with a secret.
788	"Radioactivity"	24 December 2011
A hospital receives four patients in critical condition with mysterious symptoms. When all of them suddenly die of radioactive exposure, the hospital is vacated immediately in panic.
789	"Vampire"	30 December 2011
The CID team is called to a theatre where a senior actor dressed as a vampire is found dead.
790	"Happy New Year"	31 December 2011
As midnight approaches and the celebratory mood builds up, a few of the guests, receive shocking news on their mobile phones one after the other in quick succession, making them leave the party in a state of panic.

== 2012 ==
Episode	Title	Original release date
791	"Holiday Murder"	6 January 2012
The CID team decides to go on a holiday to Fredricks's hometown. But on their first morning there, while out for a walk. Abhijeet and Tarika stumble upon a skeleton in a field.
792	"The Case of the Lift Murder"	7 January 2012
Piyush, a disco owner found murdered in a lift, but there is no wound on his body or evidence for a cause of death.
793	"The Secret of the Girl in White Shirt"	13 January 2012
On a road, a frightened teenage girl is trying to escape a robber who wants her bag. She boards a bus, but the robber follows her there, too. During the scuffle, blood-stained tissues and a dagger fall out of her bag.
794	"The Case of the Predictions"	14 January 2012
A psychic who can read mind finds that one of the guests on his show is a killer, and is going to kill a girl.
795	"The Case of Daya and Missing Child Part I"	20 January 2012
Daya shoots a man in an encounter. Meanwhile, a woman informs CID that her baby has been kidnapped, and her husband, who went to pay the ransom, has gone missing. Daya is then accused of killing him.
796	"The Case of Daya and Missing Child Part II"	21 January 2012
The kidnapped baby is found in Daya’s house. CID realize that somebody is trying to frame Daya.
797	"Haunted Hospital"	27 January 2012
In hospital, a man in white attacked a nurse and escaped. Cops found that the patient died of sonic weapons.
798	"The Secret of Newspaper"	28 January 2012
A journalist named Nishikant is killed in a newspaper office.
799	"Killer Tree"	3 February 2012
Rahul, Vicky, Anita and Natasha decide to go for a picnic at the haunted bungalow of Vicky's uncle. The caretaker at the bungalow warns the children not enter the jungle behind the bungalow since it is haunted by ghosts.
800	"Go Fish"	4 February 2012
Akash’s birthday party is going on at Monica’s farm house, and they are playing a card game called Go Fish. Soon a chit comes up while playing the game that says that “M” will die that night.
801	"Abhijeet's Mother"	10 February 2012
A woman and her son are attacked by an unknown assailant next to a pay phone.
802	"Valentine's Gift"	11 February 2012
Friendship between Rishabh and Ankit sours when they fight on Valentine’s Day.
803	"Superstitions"	17 February 2012
A highly superstitious man worries when his wife makes a series of mistakes that may lead to something terrible.
804	"The Secret of 25 Year Old Corpse"	18 February 2012
A builder trying to sell his property is surprised when a storm uproots a tree and a corpse is found under the stump.
805	"The Case of the Unknown Caller"	24 February 2012
CID team received a call.Cops went at the spot.No one agreed that they had called CID.
806	"Stalker"	25 February 2012
A stalker makes Kamya's life miserable.
807	"The Case of the Missing Witness"	2 March 2012
A thief trying to break into a car finds a dead body inside.
808	"Killing Nails"	3 March 2012
A group of college students meet with an accident and kill a man in the process.
809	"Holi Murder"	9 March 2012
Guests at a Holi party find a cadaver next to a tree.
810	"Killer Bank"	10 March 2012
Officials at the bank panic when the find a man choking to death inside the office.
811	"Dahej Ka Danav"	16 March 2012
A woman is repeatedly tortured by her in-laws. They even take her to a secluded area to kill her. The woman's sister-in-law calls CID and they save the woman. However, another attempt is made on her life.
812	"The Brave Kid"	17 March 2012
A child witnesses a group of men throwing a person in a pool. The child manages to save him from drowning but is hospitalised.
813	"Buland Hosle"	23 March 2012
Three statues that were recently auctioned become the reason behind murders.
814	"Choti Si Asha"	24 March 2012
A couple is fatally shot in a mugging-gone-wrong case.
815	"The Struggle Against the Dacoits"	30 March 2012
A group of tourists, travelling inside dangerous territories, become ambitious and ask the driver to take them to secluded parts of the jungle. However, they are attacked and taken hostage by dacoits.
816	"The Secret of the Wheelchair"	31 March 2012
Neighbours hear a ruckus and rush outside to check. They hear a couple inside their home, screaming for help.
817	"Mission Shirdi Part I"	6 April 2012
A man walking around in the mall with a mysterious package enters the restroom and is attacked.
818	"Mission Shirdi Part II"	7 April 2012
With the knowledge that the bus is going towards Shirdi, CID is trying to get ahead of them and stop the bus.
819	"The Secret of Boondighat"	13 April 2012
Two set of accidents where the victims are murdered under strange circumstances.
820	"The Secret of the Heart Attack"	14 April 2012
An owner of a call center dies inside his office under mysterious circumstances.
821	"Rift in CID Part I"	20 April 2012
Daya sees ACP in a restaurant with woman carrying a gun, he becomes suspicious but ACP rejects his calls.
822	"Rift in CID Part II"	21 April 2012
With ACP on the run and missing, the DCP orders the team to find Pradyuman as soon as possible.
823	"Rift in CID Part III"	27 April 2012
A phone next to a dead body with the last dialed number creates more suspicions.
824	"Rift in CID Part IV"	28 April 2012
The rift between CID members deepens. With DCP on an ambitious hunt for the ACP, he interrogates all the junior members but none of them open their mouths.
825	"The Secret of the Dead TV Reporter"	4 May 2012
On a live show, Malay is interviewing an astrologer who predicts his death and Malay dies in some time.
826	"The Secret of the Suicide"	5 May 2012
CID face a bizarre case of mass suicide where people in the city are suddenly killing themselves without any reason.
827	"The Secret of the Bad Uncle"	11 May 2012
An old couple returning from a weekend holiday find a terrified 4-year-old child in the backseat of their car.
828	"Kids Special"	12 May 2012
Stories are rife about a deserted house from which a family disappeared 3 months ago.
829	"The Secret of the Missing Child"	18 May 2012
Aryan and his mother Niharika have been kidnapped and are hiding in the jungle.
830	"Kids Special"	19 May 2012
A series of deaths with a signature is taking place in the city and CID is on the lookout for the killer.
831	"The Killer Secret of the Operation Theatre"	25 May 2012
Vijay is brought into the operation theatre where he is being operated by Dr Mayur. He instructs his assistant Sonia to get the oxygen cylinder but she doesn't respond and it ends up killing Vijay.
832	"The Secret of the Accident"	26 May 2012
A girl named Richa dies due to an accident while she was on her way to the CID bureau to reveal a secret.
833	"The Secret of the Missing Parents"	1 June 2012
In the special episode of CID, Shiva from Rowdy Rathore rescues a child searching for his parents.
834	"The Secret of the Dead Bodies With Human Bite Marks"	2 June 2012
CID finds bodies with human bite marks.
835	"The Secret of the Silver Bullet"	8 June 2012
Jairaj along with his wife and daughter are packing their bags to run away as they are in a financial loss.
836	"Call of Death"	9 June 2012
CID receives a call from a stranger who is under attack but before he can say anything the call is disconnected.
837	"Corpse After Corpse"	15 June 2012
Deepak, Jatin and their other friends witness a man named Vikram falling from an under-construction building and call CID.
838	"Dum Dum Bullet"	16 June 2012
This episode deals with the infamous DUM DUM bullet that was invented in Kolkata and used in the Norway shootout.
839	"The Secret of the Kidnapped Scientists"	22 June 2012
A vegetable vendor spots a man falling from a running bus. The man is still conscious but dies in front of the vendor.
840	"Traitor in CID"	23 June 2012
The inhabitants of a society call CID to complain about one of their inhabitant named Vikram who has a gun with him. Vikram is shot in a scuffle between CID cops. CID Inspector Purvi learns that she was one of the children kidnapped by Vikram and learns about her father's role in the kidnappings.
841	"Killer Water"	29 June 2012
A child is terrified upon seeing blood in a swimming pool.
842	"The Secret of Head and Hand"	30 June 2012
Cut off human body parts are found in a park.
843	"The Case of the Hanging Bodies"	1 July 2012
A man named Sudhanshu is found dead hanging between two buildings from a rope.
844	"The Mysterious Bullet Part I"	6 July 2012
A man named Varun falls from a building in front of many people.
845	"The Mysterious Bullet Part II"	7 July 2012
During the working hours in a commercial building, a dead body falls down from the building.
846	"The Mysterious Bullet Part III"	8 July 2012
In a posh building, a girl is shot at point-blank range by her cousin and the murder is witnessed by her housemaid and society members.
847	"Tarika in Danger"	13 July 2012
Dr. Salunkhe receives a jar of blue bottle flies at his house and he is alarmed that something awry is about to happen.
848	"CID against Adaalat Part I ^{^}"	14 July 2012
Raja is killed in the makeup room of a dance bar. A bar dancer named Julie witnesses this and informs CID. The cops learn that Raja was in fact an undercover cop named Rohit. DCP Chitrole is accused in the killing of Rohit and K.D Pathak decides to prove him innocent.
849	"CID against Adaalat Part II ^{^}"	15 July 2012
The DCP has been given a life sentence, but CID finds the DCP's driver's dead body in the warehouse along with RDX that can prove DCP not guilty.
850	"Dead Informers"	20 July 2012
CID's informants are being killed one by one and no one knows the reason and creates a divide between Daya and Abhijeet.
851	"The Secret of the Missing Husband"	21 July 2012
A woman named Asha is being taken in an ambulance to the hospital but she flees midway only to bump against Abhijit who gets her medical help.
852	"The Secret of the Killer Tool"	22 July 2012
CID is informed about mysterious deaths on the highway near a wildlife sanctuary.
853	"CID Officer in Danger Part I"	27 July 2012
A group of children find a blood-soaked bottle.
854	"CID Officer in Danger Part II"	28 July 2012
Ranveer, Tanuj and Sanjana argue whether or not to kill Roma.
855	"The Secret of the Missing Corpse"	29 July 2012
Shaina, an aspiring young model on her first visit to Mumbai is offered temporary accommodation by her college senior where she notices drops of blood falling and resting on the window glass.
856	"Raksha Bandhan Special"	3 August 2012
As Rakhi celebrations are going on in Raja's sprawling mansion, the family hears a shriek of Raja's daughter Deepika. As everyone rushes to the first-floor bedroom they find Deepika lying dead in a pool of blood.
857	"Life Imprisonment"	4 August 2012
Dev, who is the prime suspect in the murder of his wife Priya had disappeared since then.
858	"The Secret of the Kidnapped Birthday Girl"	5 August 2012
Two masked men enter a restaurant and kidnap Saloni who was celebrating her birthday with her friends.
859	"Final Proof"	10 August 2012
A group of youngsters are loitering on a seashore. They find a bottle with a blood-stained note inside that says “I have been killed by my brother and I was called from Jaâ€¦.
860	"Freddy's Wife a Killer"	11 August 2012
A female boss is murdered in the parking lot near her office. Meanwhile, Inspector Freddy's wife who worked under her is gone missing.
861	"The Secret of the Girl in Red Raincoat"	12 August 2012
Superstar Yuvi comes out of his film premier and dies while giving autographs to his fans. CID, after looking at the footage, spot a girl in a red raincoat reaching close to him to his shock.
862	"Target: 15 August"	17 August 2012
A journalist informs CID that he received a call from an unknown source warning him about an impending danger to the city on Independence Day.
863	"The Secret of the Bride's Death"	18 August 2012
One of the brides at a mass wedding ceremony suddenly dies there.
864	"The Mysterious Hotel"	19 August 2012
CID Inspector Shreya is asked for help by a hotel employee while she is having dinner. She and Purvi go to meet the man in an isolated place but suddenly Purvi goes missing and there is blood near the site where Purvi was last seen.
865	"The Secret of the Killer Husband"	24 August 2012
A middle-aged socialite Pramila, whose life has been under threat for quite some time now goes everywhere with bodyguards but despite that, she is stabbed to death.
866	"CID Officer Vineet Arrested"	25 August 2012
During a raid on the drug dealers, the CID team is shocked to find Officer Vineet at the spot with a bag full of drugs but he denies his involvement.
867	"CID Officer Rajat Guilty"	31 August 2012
CID cops find a huge amount of blood in a house nearby, a girl's dead body and Rajat himself colored in blood.
868	"Haunted Haveli"	2 September 2012
The film unit had come to shoot for their movie, Raaz 3, in a mansion that was supposedly haunted. To the horror of the crew, a crew member's dead body tumbles out of a cupboard.
869	"Curse on Bride"	7 September 2012
In a cursed village, the bride is invariably killed just when the marriage is about to take place.
870	"Ice Pick Killer"	8 September 2012
Two young women, Angana and Yukta, are killed in a similar manner with ice picks drawn through their throats.
871	"The Mystery of the Baby Girl"	14 September 2012
The watchman raises an alarm when he sees a very young girl hanging from a flat's balcony.
872	"Fake Face"	15 September 2012
Arnab is found murdered in his study room while his wife's birthday party is going on.
873	"Threat to Heroine"	21 September 2012
Superstar Kareena Kapoor receives a bomb threat to stop her promotion of the movie and to leave Bollywood by an obsessed fan. He wants her to come to him otherwise he will kill her on the day of the release of her movie Heroine. CID gets into the case and finds the dead body of Kareena's bodyguard.
874	"The Mystery of the Locked Room Murder"	22 September 2012
Three contestants are preparing for the finale of Miss Popularity show. One of the contestants, Shivangi, is found mysteriously dead in her room.
875	"The Secret of 2 O'clock Murders"	28 September 2012
A rich middle-aged couple Prateek and his wife Minaali shift to a bungalow in Mumbai. On the very night, Minaali dies in a bomb blast in the house.
876	"Traitor"	29 September 2012
Jeevan, a gangster breaks out of jail at midnight, 3 days before he was set to be released from prison.
877	"Killer Drugs"	5 October 2012
CID find a blood splatter on the terrace of a building and assume that someone might be hurt.
878	"Room No. 303"	6 October 2012
A middle-aged woman, Maaya, tells the CID bureau that her daughter Lakshita died in the town of Kothgarh by falling off the balcony of her room- which is said to be haunted.
879	"Abhijeet Ka Intequam Part I"	12 October 2012
CID are tasked with transporting a witness of a month-old bomb blast from a secret hideout to a court hearing, where he is going to testify against a terrorist. Abhijeet is then ordered to protect the witness's daughter but fails to do so when they are attacked by goons, who injure Abhijeet and take the girl away.
880	"Abhijeet Ka Intequam Part II"	13 October 2012
Abhijeet survives the shooting and the CID team try to find the girl.
881	"The Mysterious Footprint"	19 October 2012
A group of trekkers find a dead body in a mutilated condition with a huge footprint print in the body.
882	"Death by Fire or Drowning"	20 October 2012
CID are meeting an informant, when a fire breaks out in a nearby bungalow.
883	"Corpse No. 47"	26 October 2012
Two ward boys, while placing dead bodies in a morgue, are startled to find that a dead body, belonging to a prisoner named Munna, has gone missing.
884	"The Secret of the Bank Locker"	27 October 2012
Poorvi and Shreya are at the bank when suddenly, five robbers enter the bank and everyone inside hostage. They kidnap the two cops, but the CID manage to save them, while the robbers die when their van explodes.
885	"The Secret of the Death of Daya's Friends"	2 November 2012
Daya's friend Juhi is found dead in an unusual condition, with her body in a sitting upright with no sign of external injuries.
886	"The Case of the Poisonous Fruits"	3 November 2012
Nine people perish from food poisoning at a party, showing the same symptoms of rash and concussion.
887	"The Secret of the Breaking News"	9 November 2012
CID is informed that a major criminal named Raghu is meeting with the parents of somebody he has taken hostage at a certain location, where he intends to collect a ransom.
888	"Anokha Khooni Shadyantra"	10 November 2012
Cops come across a murder attempt on a man.
889	"Abhijeet's Fan"	16 November 2012
Abhijeet receives a phone call from a woman who says she has been assaulted. He goes to the spot but is knocked unconscious and kidnapped by a woman who claims to be Abhijeet's fan.
890	"Kidnapping a Baby"	17 November 2012
A child is kidnapped from a hospital by an unknown lady.
891	"Red Suitcase Murder Part I"	23 November 2012
The mutilated bodies of several police officers begin to be found across the city in big red suitcases- the bodies cut up into pieces with their identification tags.
892	"Red Suitcase Murder Part II"	24 November 2012
CID team up with the fearless Inspector Shekhawat from Talaash, digging into cases that he has worked on in the past involving similar serial killings.
893	"Painting"	30 November 2012
A painting exhibition is being held at a farm house by two business partners, Sumit and Vimal. Things turn sour when a guest discovers blood on one of the paintings.
894	"Chocolate Murder"	1 December 2012
A young couple find a woman’s dead body in a very strange condition- it is covered, from top to bottom, in chocolate.
895	"Filmy Murder"	7 December 2012
Vicky, the son of a film star name Mukul in the twilight of his career is found dead at the Mahurat party of his debut film.
896	"The Secret of the Burnt Corpse"	8 December 2012
A newly married couple are mysteriously burned alive in their home.
897	"The Mystery of the Killer Book"	14 December 2012
An acclaimed author is at the release of his new book, reading out a passage in which a character is murdered, when suddenly, the lights are turned off.
898	"Kidnapping of CID Officers"	15 December 2012
Abhijit, Daya, Sachin and Nikhil wake up in a closed room and realize that they have been kidnapped.
899	"CID Par Grahan Part I"	21 December 2012
ACP Pradyuman is being dropped off outside his colony by Dr.Salunkhe after a dinner, when he sees a newly married woman is running away from a group of men carrying swords.
900	"CID Par Grahan Part II"	22 December 2012
When the woman dies because of a mistake made by ACP Pradyuman, he immediately resigns from his job out of guilt.
901	"CID Par Grahan Part III"	28 December 2012
ACP Pradyuman joins a marriage bureau as a consultant and counselor.
902	"CID Par Grahan Part IV"	29 December 2012
DCP Chittrole breaks the news to the CID team that ACP Pradyuman is working at the same marriage bureau where illegal activities were an under handed affair.

^{^} Denotes crossover with Adaalat

== 2013 ==
Episode	Title	Original release date
903	"Unknown Corpse"	4 January 2013
A man is killed in a flat in the middle of the night, but no one from the flat knew of the murder in their own flat.
904	"Game of Ghost"	5 January 2013
After a gun fight Daya and Abhijeet manage to save ACP Pradyuman.
905	"Killer Book"	11 January 2013
A woman trying to steal a book from a library at night, mysteriously dies when something spokes are in her neck.
906	"The Secret of 5 Robbers"	12 January 2013
An altercation between five criminals turns fatal when they all point their guns at each other.
907	"Diamond Theft"	18 January 2013
A diamond merchant is brutally murdered at his office and the diamonds which he had bought from an auction are stolen.
908	"The Secret of the Finger"	19 January 2013
A woman reading the newspaper by herself suddenly receives a package at her door, where she finds a mutilated finger.
909	"The Mysterious Dangerous Virus I"	25 January 2013
A group of masked men attacks a government Research Centre.
910	"The Mysterious Dangerous Virus II"	26 January 2013
With Daya injured and the criminals on the run, it's a race against time.
911	"The Mysterious Death of the Dancer"	1 February 2013
Mohini, a Bharatnatyam dancer is all geared up for her big day.
912	"Fake Face I"	2 February 2013
A man Bakul is found dead in his farm house.
913	"Fake Face II"	3 February 2013
CID learns that Rashmi was involved in the killing but they also learn of her Split Personality disorder.
914	"Murder by Hypnosis"	8 February 2013
A married couple Siddhanth and Maamvi are going for a dinner on the eve of their wedding anniversary. Siddhanth receives a call from a mysterious number.
915	"Game of Death"	9 February 2013
CID get a distress call from a victim.
916	"The Secret of the Bone Crockery"	10 February 2013
A couple is having lunch in a hotel. Suddenly, the wife chokes on something while drinking soup and dies on the spot. CID find out that the crockery in which the soup was served was made of bones.
917	"Skeletons on a Tree"	15 February 2013
Two skeletons wearing clothes are found hanging from a tree, with a letter threatening their parents to agree to their relationship or else they will meet the same fate.
918	"Death of Salunkhe"	16 February 2013
A group of friends come across a dead body during a trek in a jungle. While examining it, Dr. Salunkhe is injured by a blast from a bomb planted in it.
919	"MMS of Death"	22 February 2013
People are being sent scary and terrifying videos through MMS warning them of their impending death.
920	"Poisonous Death"	23 February 2013
A killing spree on the highway terrorizes the city.
921	"Car Murder"	24 February 2013
A man is shot dead on the driving seat of the car, but no one saw anyone shooting him nor did anyone hear a gun shot.
922	"Killer Play"	1 March 2013
Maanas, a famous painter, dreams of two cruel murders and he paints them on canvas as soon as he wakes up from the dream.
923	"Haunted Haveli"	2 March 2013
Rahul is missing as his wife reaches out to CID for help.
924	"Light Box Murder"	3 March 2013
In an international tours and travels agency, a body is discovered in a light box.
925	"Magical Box"	8 March 2013
A famous magician-Tushar is performing his trick of magical sword chest where he puts his 2 assistants- Hiten and Ritu inside the box and then he puts swords in the chest.
926	"Skeleton in Divider"	9 March 2013
A skeleton is found buried in a divider. CID is informed about this and they are on the case.
927	"Red Shoe lady"	10 March 2013
Two women named Mukta and Preeti kill their husbands on their wedding nights but the reason is unknown.
928	"House of Wax"	15 March 2013
Ronita is an news anchor who disappears while she is on her way to meet the mayor.
929	"Journey to Death"	16 March 2013
A man enters a BEST bus and finds all the passengers and the conductor dead.
930	"I am a Murderer"	17 March 2013
A woman walks into the CID bureau to surrender herself for the murder of her husband but when CID goes to take custody of the body, the body is missing.
931	"Mahabharat I"	22 March 2013
Urban theatre group Kalabhawan perform in every small town in India but there is a strange layer of crime related to them.
932	"Mahabharat II"	23 March 2013
Urban theatre group Kalabhawan perform in every small town in India but there is a strange layer of crime related to them.
933	"A Red Holi"	24 March 2013
Ragini and Deepak have organised a party for their friends. They hear a loud scream and find a dead body in the swimming pool.
934	"Monty Thief"	29 March 2013
The secretary of a businessman is found dead in his own house and his body is found in the locker. A thief named Monty is the main suspect of the case.
935	"Murder of the Killer"	31 March 2013
Prithvi, a famous serial killer will be sentenced for his horrific crimes today.
936	"Search"	5 April 2013
A woman named Juhi goes missing.
937	"Magical Mask"	6 April 2013
Rich and wealthy people of the city are invited to a party by an anonymous host with a promise of making them richer.
938	"Commando"	7 April 2013
CID cop Purvi is missing and the entire team is looking for her. A mysterious man who knows Purvi helps them.
939	"Daya in Danger ^{†}"	12 April 2013
A mute girl, Anjali helps Daya by signaling him through her drawings that his life is in danger. However, she is kidnapped by criminals who want Daya unarmed in exchange for the girl.
940	"Mask of Heroine"	13 April 2013
Famous film star Shanaaya's enemy producer Sohan is killed and her fingerprints are found at the crime site.
941	"The Secret of the Jungle Girl"	14 April 2013
A woman is brought to CID with an engraving on her skin as “CID Help”.
942	"Abhijeet in Danger I"	19 April 2013
Abhijit is found unconscious by a fisherman on the seashore. He has been shot twice in his back. When he gains consciousness in the hospital, he doesn't recall his identity and is accused with a murder of an innocent girl.
943	"Abhijeet in Danger II"	20 April 2013
CID is shocked to see Abhijit's involvement in the murder.
944	"Women Defense"	26 April 2013
A girl seeks help from CID after she escapes a racket being run by an unknown person in which girls are sold as brides.
945	"Torture on Women"	27 April 2013
A woman who is standing up to empower other women in her village through education is killed.
946	"Revenge of Torture"	28 April 2013
CID deals with a case of domestic violence where a woman is burnt and thrown from her flat window.
947	"Little Comedian Kidnapped ^{†}"	3 May 2013
Parents of a famous comedian child Saloni receive a threat call to stop her from performing.
948	"Game of Kidnapper"	4 May 2013
The wife of a famous and rich businessman is kidnapped and a ransom of 5 crores is asked.
949	"The Secret of the Coffin Box"	5 May 2013
Two friends, Arnav and Vansh are shopping in a mall abroad when a woman bumps into Arnav at the store. As soon as he helps her, he suffers a heart attack and dies. When the body is taken back to India, the body disappears, and Vansh is accused of stealing Arnav’s dead body.
950	"The Mystery of 5 Corpses"	10 May 2013
A blind boy with bloodstains on his clothes becomes the key to unraveling a haunting mystery of five dead bodies.
951	"The Secret of Not Rotting Corpse"	11 May 2013
A middle-aged couple find the dead body of a woman in a corner of a park, where there is no blood clotting around her gunshot wound.
952	"The Mystery of 26 Skeletons"	12 May 2013
A land baron illegally seizes a large tract of land with plans to develop a farm resort. However, CID becomes involved when soil samples from the land reveal traces of 26 different human DNAs, and further excavations reveal 26 skeletons of people who died in a massacre.
953	"The Mystery of an Insect"	17 May 2013
A group of scientists, while searching for a rare plant in the jungle, encounter a major trouble as Tanya spots a dead body half buried in the jungle.
954	"The Mystery of the Cutten Finger"	18 May 2013
A finger is found in a fish and Salunkhe tells cops by examining the nails that it belongs to a girl who had kidney problems.
955	"Killer Corpse"	19 May 2013
Ishaan, a young man, has a showdown with the Range Safety Officer Gyaan which ends in an attendant being shot.
956	"Phone Booth Murder"	24 May 2013
Raunak, a popular movie star, has an untimely death inside a phone booth while shooting for his film.
957	"The Missing Son"	25 May 2013
A lady states that her son Jatin is missing and blames his disappearance on a model, Shaina.
958	"Murder in Jail"	26 May 2013
An annual day celebration is taking place in the jail when two murders take place in the special cell.
959	"Crime in Rishikesh I"	31 May 2013
Three men, who do not know each other, go missing while river rafting in Rishikesh.
960	"Crime in Rishikesh II"	1 June 2013
Cops are stunned when they come to know that DCP Chitrole has called Dhenchu to Rishikesh.
961	"Crime in Rishikesh III"	2 June 2013
After a chase through rough waters, ACP and Daya nab one of the suspects of a series of murders as others escape.
962	"Murder in Haridwar I"	7 June 2013
ACP notices a strange man meeting DCP and he recounts that the man is the same one who attacked Dhenchu.
963	"Murder in Haridwar II"	8 June 2013
The cops find out that Dhenchu has not reached Mumbai and has disappeared.
964	"Traitor in CID"	9 June 2013
DCP Chitrole continues to appear suspicious in his tracking of a kidnapped Dhenchu and the lives of the mysterious remaining two men.
965	"Killer Witch"	14 June 2013
A group of girls are telling each other ghost stories in their hostel dormitory.
966	"Murder in Sleep"	15 June 2013
A housewife wakes up in the morning to realize that her husband sleeping beside her has been fatally shot.
967	"The Secret of 3 Corpses"	21 June 2013
A family is having a picnic in the woods when they find an unconscious girl smeared in blood.
968	"The Secret of the Death of Heroine"	22 June 2013
A famous actress, Niharika dies while performing a car stunt during her film shoot. Elsewhere, police are informed about a murder where the victim's body parts are cut and half burnt.
969	"The Secret of the Bullets in Farmhouse"	23 June 2013
An architect finds two bullets stuck in a brick of a farmhouse. During the investigation, additional bullets are found in the wall.
970	"Murder of Dead Man"	28 June 2013
A decomposed body is found inside a well by an unsuspecting couple. CID finds out that the victim had received a death sentence for murder and had been hanged three years ago.
971	"Corpse Fallen Down From Sky"	29 June 2013
During an upcoming movie's music launch at a hotel, a celebrity is giving an interview when a body falls from the sky onto her car. Initial speculation that the body is of the movie's lead is found false when it is revealed that he never went to the hotel.
972	"The Secret of the Friend's Murder"	30 June 2013
Madhu comes back from a party where his ex-boyfriend was misbehaving with her.
973	"Scarecrow Killer"	5 July 2013
A man was driving home from work late at night and falls asleep behind the wheel. After waking up, he sees a dead woman dressed as a scarecrow. Daya and Shreya, while searching for the scarecrow killer, are kidnapped.
974	"Murder in CID Bureau"	6 July 2013
Daya and Abhijeet are on the lookout for a man named Dragon who operates a secret terrorist cell and is responsible for the death of Daya's friend Viraj in an anti-terrorist operation years ago. After arresting him, Daya is accused of shooting him in the bureau. However, the story takes twist when a woman comes to the CID bureau and claims that the person shot dead was her husband.
975	"Sharp Shooter"	7 July 2013
Prithvi, an infamous serial killer who is set to be hanged, steps out of the courtroom and is shot dead. CID finds it to be a bullet from a sniper.
976	"Red Rain"	12 July 2013
A couple is traversing a jungle when it starts raining heavily. They run towards a tree to find some shade. While taking shelter they realize that blood is falling from the tree.
977	"Predator of Jungle I"	13 July 2013
CID officers have been summoned to the jungle by a woman who says she is in danger.
978	"Predator of Jungle II"	14 July 2013
Forensic analysis reveals that some sort of chemical has been injected into the victim’s body to change their genetic code.
979	"Three Convicts"	19 July 2013
The three main characters from the film Bajatey Raho are caught in the middle of a CID case, when they turn up at an MNC where CID are about to capture two infamous con artists named Aryan and Shimona. The MNC owners have been shot dead in their conference room. There was reportedly nobody in the room apart from the owners.
980	"Voice of Death"	20 July 2013
A senior accountant arrives late for work on a Monday morning. Moments later, a gunshot is heard from his cubicle.
981	"Innocent in Danger"	26 July 2013
A man is spotted running on a road in bloody clothes with a dagger, carrying a baby in his arms.
982	"One Man Three Hands"	27 July 2013
A strange bag is found left under the seat of a movie theatre and the city's bomb squad is summoned.
983	"Intoxication of Death"	28 July 2013
Shilpa is a traumatized TV actress recovering from her fiancé’s death and being stalked.
984	"Murder in Matheran"	2 August 2013
A man is killed in a Mumbai Mall.
985	"ACP in Danger"	3 August 2013
There is a shootout at a construction site between CID and a band of criminals.
986	"Haunted Colony"	4 August 2013
The dead body of a man is discovered in an abandoned cottage on the outskirts of the city, with a strange symbol drawn in blood near it.
987	"Telephone of Death I"	9 August 2013
ACP, Daya and Sachin are in the town of Kikkar for a seminar, when one night, all three of them receive calls from a panicked stranger telling them that in the span of the next 24-48 hours, three murders will take place.
988	"Telephone of Death II"	10 August 2013
The three CID officers wake up in an enclosed room and realize they have been kidnapped.
989	"War of Independence"	11 August 2013
CID is summoned to the Independence Day function at a jail, where a blast occurs.
990	"Sonakshi in Danger"	16 August 2013
The press conference of a film is happening at a 5 star hotel. While everyone is waiting for the lead actress, Sonakshi, to join, they hear her shriek from inside her room.
991	"The Secret of the Video Game"	17 August 2013
A huge horror game contest takes place, and 5 people win prizes. Later, the prize winners are being killed one by one, seemingly by the fictitious villain of the game they won.
992	"Raksha Bandhan Special"	18 August 2013
The cops find a mutilated body in the woods that seems to have been eaten by wild animals. However, DNA evidence pointing from the crime scene suggest that the victim was murdered by a human. The DNA belongs to a woman named Geeta, who is revealed to be CID Inspector Rajat's sister.
993	"Saloon Killer"	23 August 2013
A dead body is discovered in a somewhat strange state- the victim seemed to have been getting his hair cut when he was stabbed using a pair of scissors used for the haircut.
994	"Haunted Haveli"	24 August 2013
A group of friends go to an old haunted mansion to make a documentary, when suddenly they realize that one of the friends, Kunal, has gone missing.
995	"Baby in Danger"	25 August 2013
CID is called by someone who has just witnessed the accidental hit-and-run murder of a woman by a speeding truck. Daya, Freedy and Shreya find the child and take care of her. Tension unfolds when goons try to attack the child.
996	"Aankho Ki Anhoni"	30 August 2013
At an art exhibition, a glass statue falls and breaks accidentally.
997	"Junglee Manav"	31 August 2013
People are turning into zombie-like creatures and attacking each other, after being bitten by the infected.
998	"Shreya's Devil"	6 September 2013
Shreya’s college friend Divya’s family has been killed by someone, whom Divya says had a tattoo on his hand.
999	"Nikhil's War"	7 September 2013
CID officer Nikhil needs money for an operation for his mother to survive.
1000	"The Mouse Trap I"	13 September 2013
The CID team is after a gangster Billa Dilaawar but he double-crosses them and escapes.
1001	"The Mouse Trap II"	14 September 2013
Because CID learns that IB officer Milind has to provide some national security information to Billa Dilaawar. So his son is kidnapped.
1002	"Forensic Mystery I"	20 September 2013
The CID team is resolving a double murder case – Lakshita and Indrani. However, a mysterious clue and Dr. Salunkhe's sudden indefinite break, makes the investigation and conclusion look botched.
1003	"Forensic Mystery II"	21 September 2013
The substitute forensic doctor – Dr.Sameer along with Dr.Tarika’s assistance, proves Dr.Salunkhe’s forensic report to be fake.
1004	"Mysterious Island I"	27 September 2013
Dr Salunke is on the run on an island as he is being chased by local tribesmen shooting arrows past him. As he reaches a thatch and tries to send a radio a signal before being knocked down.
1005	"Mysterious Island II"	28 September 2013
The team is under attack at the hill top where the fisherman who guided them till now is shot by a burning arrow.
1006	"Mysterious Island III"	4 October 2013
ACP and his team are just outside the bunker as they pick up old rusted rifles to inspect them.
1007	"Mysterious Island IV"	5 October 2013
The team is trapped on the island and in mortal danger.
1008	"Murder at the Satara I"	11 October 2013
The CID team comes across a stabbed and dying man Shashank at the Mumbai State border who reveals to them about a dead body near a waterfall. While investigating, Daya tries his best to save Abhijeet from falling in the river but fails. The team finds a camera near the waterfall.
1009	"Murder at the Satara II"	12 October 2013
The key and shoe lead CID into a wealthy family.
1010	"Chehre Pe Chehra"	18 October 2013
Amay sees Avantika, his wife being chased by goons and rushes to inform his friend Kunal But Kunal tells him his wife, is at the salon.
1011	"ACP Murder"	19 October 2013
ACP Pradyuman is shot at a friend's son's birthday party, unexpectedly and this coincides with the CID team's hunt for a notorious arms dealer, Vidhaan.
1012	"Killer Insect"	25 October 2013
A man Diwakar dies while eating food on his dining table, somebody who had OCD and complulsively cleaned.
1013	"Mysterious Bomb"	26 October 2013
A group of friends go for a walk on Marine drive at night. As they walk, they hear a scream and turn their back to find a lady lying on the street screaming in pain.
1014	"Black Diwali I"	1 November 2013
On diwali night, a man is chased by goons and shot.
1015	"Black Diwali II"	2 November 2013
Jatin is killed before he could give any info to the CID.
1016	"The Secret of the Boarding School I"	8 November 2013
One of the biggest Hit-men in the country Tiger, was hired to do a job in a very famous boarding school. Fortunately Tiger dies in a freak road accident.
1017	"The Secret of the Boarding School II"	9 November 2013
The team reaches Daya lying on the road in a pool of blood and rush him to the hospital.
1018	"Daya in Danger I"	15 November 2013
The CID team is on their way to the CID bureau after meeting DCP Chittrole, when an accident on the road halts their plan. They witness a woman carrying a paper bag cross the street, who begins suffocating. Daya takes the bag and places it into his vehicle. The young lady is taken to the hospital immediately, but poisoning kills her shortly after. Daya finds a wooden box in the paper bag but before he can react, a blast then occurs in the car which injures him. The CID team learn that Daya is in a coma.
1019	"Daya in Danger II"	16 November 2013
The CID team is shocked and traumatized by Daya’s accident even though he survives; he has lost parts of his memory due to trauma.
1020	"Singh Saab Ki Jung"	22 November 2013
Saranjeet Singh ‘Sunny Deol', an incarcerated IAS officer, calls CID in jail to investigate a case of an old man.
1021	"Mysterious Tree"	23 November 2013
A hitchhiker named Gayatri disappears mysteriously in the forest.
1022	"Mysterious Space Ship"	29 November 2013
A bunch of people come to an open area to witness a meteor shower. As they watch the spectacle, they see something falling from the sky.
1023	"Dead Mother's Secret"	30 November 2013
Siblings in the mall are shocked to see their dead mother alive in the crowd, before they could do anything, a security guard dies in a shootout.
1024	"Boogie Woogie in Danger"	6 December 2013
Ravi, while entering an abandoned house and is wondering why Naved has called him to this place. They have a massive Boogie Woogie launch and there was so much to do.
1025	"Shadow became death"	7 December 2013
Kavita comes rushing home and tells her husband Aman that she saw Suraj. He is shocked and does not believe her. Then she sees Suraj jump from the opposite flat and panics.
1026	"Invisible Gun I"	13 December 2013
Moon Space Company plans to send Manish to space and he is undergoing a flying training but accidentally dies.
1027	"Invisible Gun II"	14 December 2013
CID puts Inspector Nikhil under flying training to see how Manish died.
1028	"Creepy Face"	20 December 2013
A couple is going to their village for a holiday but their car breaks down midway. While the husband is away, the wife sees a headless corpse and faints.
1029	"Killer Stage"	21 December 2013
During the stage show of a famous musician Rocky, the stage is set on fire and takes away Rocky's life.
1030	"Creepy Mansion I"	27 December 2013
CID comes to inspect a haveli for a children's function. While playing a game there is a power cut in the haveli and a man is found dead.
1031	"Creepy Mansion II"	28 December 2013
CID officers Nikhil and Fredricks are caught in the web of the game and they end up harming people at the haveli. Out of the 13 people in the haveli, 1 is dead and the others life is in danger.

^{†} Denotes crossover with CID Chhote Heroes

== 2014 ==
Episode	Title	Original release date
1032	"Living Dead"	3 January 2014
Informer Vicky dies who was kept in a safe house to provide more information about Rocky and his gang. Dr Tarika enters the forensic lab searching for Dr Salunkhe but to her surprise, Vicky's dead body has vanished, and Salunkhe is injured.
1033	"Poisonous Snakes"	4 January 2014
Queen Shanti Devi is at a press conference with an artist, Mukesh, where she dies after being poisoned.
1034	"ACP and Nakul's Secret - I"	10 January 2014
Daya and Abhijit are trying to nab a suspected criminal named Nakul who is on the verge of committing suicide.
1035	"ACP and Nakul's Secret - II"	11 January 2014
CID has put Nakul under their watch. ACP is not convinced that Nakul is the killer and goes against his team.
1036	"Abhijeet's Struggle"	17 January 2014
CID goes to investigate the murder of a rich businessman named Raj. While investigating, Abhijeet is locked inside the panic room.
1037	"Bizarre Patients"	18 January 2014
A coma patient named Lisa suddenly starts talking in Telugu and tells the team of doctors that a man named Rinku is about to die in front of his house.
1038	"Daya absconding in Ahmedabad - I"	24 January 2014
Inspector Daya is on the run in Ahmedabad behind a criminal and Abhijit along with Purvi and Pankaj are behind Daya. The local ACP even passes shoot-at-sight orders against him.
1039	"Daya absconding in Ahmedabad - II"	25 January 2014
While Shreya is severely injured, Daya has reached the kidnapper's spot and shoots all of them dead. The cops collect more information about Sarthak who got shot by Daya and learn about his alleged role in the murder of three innocent people.
1040	"Killer Corpse"	31 January 2014
A group of friends are staying in a hotel. The next day Sagar and Mihir are found dead and their friends Anisha is found on the road.
1041	"Lift Mein Anhoni"	1 February 2014
Inspector Purvi is working undercover for CID on a case to nab a gang. She is attacked by them and kidnapped. She is then accused of killing the kidnapper in a lift.
1042	"Killer Joker"	7 February 2014
A nanny puts a girl to sleep and watches TV. While watching Tv, she notices a man dressed in a clown uniform. The joker kills the nanny and escapes.
1043	"Creepy Corpse"	8 February 2014
A boy named Mrinal encounters a strange-looking man in a jungle who claims to be a spirit and is looking for his killer. He asks Mrinal for help but a scared Mrinal runs for his life but dies.
1044	"Witch's Secret"	14 February 2014
Two women enter Dhruv's house but are hit on the head then find themselves stranded at a deserted place. Meanwhile, one of them named Shikha is dead with strange marks on her neck.
1045	"Killer Spider"	15 February 2014
A woman in a mall is killed by a spider and another man Siddhart is scared of a spider wanting to take his life.
1046	"The Secret of the Horror House"	21 February 2014
A child named Pratik is kidnapped by people from the Horror House in an amusement park. There is no ransom call and the police investigate why he was kidnapped.
1047	"Mysterious Plant"	22 February 2014
CID is baffled at a murder where there are no witnesses and all clues lead to dead ends till they come across a witness.
1048	"Shark Attack"	28 February 2014
The CID team rows into deep waters of the sea, looking for sharks who are attacking people.
1049	"Piranha Fish Attack"	1 March 2014
A national-level swimmer Param goes swimming in a lake, by trespassing the property. He meets an ugly end at the hands of a mysterious water carnivore that almost tears his body apart. Meanwhile, a photographer meets the same fate as the swimmer at another lake.
1050	"Mumbaicha Dabbawala"	7 March 2014
Two murders in Mumbai are due to poisoning.
1051	"Female Security"	8 March 2014
Working girls are being targeted on the lonely skywalk in Kharghar late at night after their jobs.
1052	"Mission Mumbai - I"	14 March 2014
A man mysteriously collapses near Dadar flower market.
1053	"Mission Mumbai - II"	15 March 2014
The third hostage has been infected and released and the cops need to find him before its too late.
1054	"CID Holi Dhamaka"	17 March 2014
CID come to know that Abhijit is going to be targeted on the day of Holi.
1055	"Diamond Robbery"	21 March 2014
In a heritage hotel a wealthy ailing man, Sampat, assembles his relatives, and announces that he would distribute his wealth among them.Sunny Leone plays the character of Raagini and records crucial evidence.
1056	"The Secret of Kanheri Caves"	22 March 2014
CID team travel to Kanheri Caves to search a guide who they suspect of doing some illegal work. Instead, they find a dead body of a man in the jungle of the Kanheri Caves and next to it is a cloth piece belonging to a girl.
1057	"Secret of Mumbai Chawl - I"	28 March 2014
This story revolves around two chawls where elderly people desperately in need of money are disappearing from their homes overnight. They are nowhere to be found.
1058	"Secret of Mumbai Chawl - II"	29 March 2014
This story revolves around two chawls where elderly people desperately in need of money are disappearing from their homes overnight and are nowhere to be found.
1059	"Bus Hijack - I"	4 April 2014
CID is called on a case of a bank robbery where all employees have been drugged and the customers locked in the vault. They investigate the case and find out that the robber's getaway vehicle was towed and that is why they hijacked a BEST bus.
1060	"Bus Hijack - II"	5 April 2014
They manage to track the bus down and ask the robbers to give up. In retaliation they throw the conductor out of the bus right in the way of the jeep of the cops.
1061	"CID Arrested - I"	11 April 2014
CID had planted 10-12 undercover cops to infiltrate the underworld but each one of them is getting killed. ACP sends Abhijeet to pick up one of them, but he is kidnapped. He wakes up the next morning lying on the road with a memory lapse.
1062	"CID Arrested - II"	12 April 2014
The cops find the identities of the two victims to be underworld goons. However, a shocking truth is revealed when the goons themselves were undercover cops working for ACP.
1063	"CID Arrested - III"	13 April 2014
Based on inputs given by a doctor who had operated on Daya, CID traces the location only to find that he has been shifted to a new hideout. Forensics also find out that the bullet in Daya's body was fired from Abhijeet's gun.
1064	"CID Arrested - IV"	18 April 2014
CID finds out that arms are being smuggled into the country. Meanwhile Abhijeet is trying to prove his innocence by investigating himself as to who shot Daya. He reaches the location where he and Daya were drugged and held captive only to be arrested and brought back to the bureau. The cops get a phone call from Daya saying that ACP shot him.
1065	"CID Arrested - V"	19 April 2014
CID is stunned to realize that ACP shot Daya and before DCP could confront ACP he runs away to save the remaining undercover agents.
1066	"CID Arrested - VI"	20 April 2014
The trio escape and defeat the goons. Now cops plan their fake death which makes Don to come out of his hiding and host a party celebrating his win.
1067	"Killer Taxi"	25 April 2014
People are disappearing and dying mysteriously on a stretch of road.
1068	"Who is the Killer of the Thieves?"	26 April 2014
Two masked thieves rob a bank and escape in their car. Somebody notices the number and calls CID who now give them a chase.
1069	"Killing in the Box"	27 April 2014
In a resort, while taking a steam box, Rachit is killed.
1070	"Jurm ki Aag"	2 May 2014
A big-time criminal is kept in the ICU on grounds of ill health and placed under high security.
1071	"Dangerous Insect"	3 May 2014
People are dying without any injury marks. The victims were asleep when they were killed.
1072	"Missing Family"	4 May 2014
Juhi's family had gone missing ten years back. Investigation revealed nothing and the case was closed.
1073	"Killer Knife"	9 May 2014
Jasmine is kidnapped in the midst of her wedding anniversary party, and soon wakes up in a deserted farmhouse where she is shocked at the sight of blood-stained knives and many es.
1074	"Corpse in the Fridge"	10 May 2014
A meditation guru is found mysteriously dead in a fridge on display in a crowded mall following a 2-minute power outage.
1075	"Attack on Anu Malik"	11 May 2014
A jaded daredevil decides to do a big stunt in front of Anu Malik so that he can appear on TV. However, the stuntman dies, and Malik is held responsible for it.
1076	"Killer Doll"	16 May 2014
Neha, a woman, has been found murdered in her house. During the investigation, the cops find out that a doll is missing from the house.
1077	"Killer Dreams"	17 May 2014
A girl in a college hostel suffers from nightmares in which she feels as though someone is trying to kill her. Soon, she is murdered in her room in the same manner as in her dreams.
1078	"The Mystery of Evidences"	18 May 2014
A notorious terrorist named Zingora sends CID an evidence bag which contains a severed finger, a bloody knife, a handwritten letter in Russian, a child’s photograph and a windchime. He challenges the CID team to find a crime scene using these pieces of evidence.
1079	"Painting Theft - I"	23 May 2014
People have gathered at a hotel for an art exhibition held by Raj, the best friend of the lead actor of the film, Heropanti, Kartik. Things turn chaotic when armed goons steal all the paintings, and Kartik is injured in the confrontation.
1080	"Painting theft - II"	24 May 2014
CID are on the trail of the gang of art thieves. They are also trying to find out more about this mysterious assassin, 'X'.
1081	"Copy Cat Serial Killer"	25 May 2014
Famous authors in the city are found murdered in very unusual crime scenes.
1082	"The Mystery of the Miracle Pond"	30 May 2014
A group of teenagers are camping in the woods, when one of them wanders off the campsite, and never returns.
1083	"Innocent at Risk - I"	31 May 2014
A bomb explodes at a function. The CID team are shocked to discover that Shreya, a deaf and dumb girl who is friends with Abhijeet, is involved.
1084	"Innocent at Risk - II"	1 June 2014
Abhijit manages to track her and arrest her after her second attack but then he and she both disappear.
1085	"Trishakti - I"	6 June 2014
A fight is going on in a local bar when a man named Tez suddenly enters- and murders everyone present.
1086	"Trishakti - II"	7 June 2014
CID are now after two culprits. Their investigation reveals a hidden document in one of the culprit, Tez's hideout, which leads them to his childhood village.
1087	"Trishakti - III"	8 June 2014
CID they encounter a third culprit, Meera who escapes from right in front of the cops. CID seems to have uncovered multiple individual with ‘superpowers’.
1088	"Murderous Magic - I"	13 June 2014
A famous magician named Ajinkya, who is heavily in debt, organizes a magic festival to earn much-needed money.
1089	"Murderous Magic - II"	14 June 2014
The highly decorated magician, DC, is conducting a three night televised show in which he intends to show never-seen-before acts.
1090	"Past Birth"	15 June 2014
Tillotma is a woman who claims to be able to send people to their past lives. She sends one such person, named Aakash, but she is unable to bring him back.
1091	"Innocent Friend - I"	20 June 2014
Nihaarika, the daughter of a billionaire goes to India with her fiancé, Ketan, for a business trip. During the trip, Nihaarika is shot at by snipers while at a food store inauguration in Mumbai.
1092	"Innocent Friend - II"	21 June 2014
CID search for their ACP but he is nowhere to be found. Meanwhile, Nihaarika is once again attacked by an assassin.
1093	"The Secret of the 3 Bullets"	22 June 2014
A man has been shot while in a moving vehicle on a busy road. Upon investigation it is found that three bullets were fired at him, out of which one killed him.
1094	"Ek Villain"	27 June 2014
Film stars Shraddha Kapoor and Sidharth Malhotra are driving to the press conference of their new film in a car when they hear a child’s scream. When Sidharth goes to investigate, he finds a gang of masked men taking a group of children somewhere. Immediately, Sid takes down the men and asks Shraddha to contact the CID. However, while talking to her over the phone, he is hit on the head from behind and loses consciousness. As the CID investigate, they learn that these children had recently been reported to have disappeared including Saransh from episode 1078.
1095	"Theft of Royal Sword"	28 June 2014
A young boy goes missing from his house. CID investigate and find out that he had overheard a plot to steal Maharana Pratap’s sword from a museum.
1096	"Killer Game"	29 June 2014
ACP Pradyuman’s friend call him over for a dinner party at his home. At the party, while playing some games, one of the guests dies.
1097	"The Secret of the Chopped Hand"	4 July 2014
During a picnic involving the CID team and some underprivileged orphans, two of the children, Tara and Chintu, are kidnapped by goons when they go to retrieve a ball near some bushes. Inspector Shreya, injured during the scuffle, fails to save them but manages to retrieve a briefcase containing a chopped hand.
1098	"Mahasangam - I ^{†}"	5 July 2014
Daya from Taarak Mehta Ka Ooltah Chashmah finds the wallet of ACP Pradyuman on a roadside and brings it to the CID bureau.
1099	"Mahasangam - II ^{†}"	6 July 2014
Late at night, a couple enter their house and go to their children’s room to check on them. They are shocked to find blood on their beds, with the children nowhere to be found- along with an unknown woman’s dead body.
1100	"Poisonous Scorpion"	11 July 2014
Abhijit is bitten by a scorpion, but his life is saved when he gets to a doctor in time. Soon, three bodies are found killed by the same kind of scorpion poison.
1101	"Mahasangam - III ^{†}"	12 July 2014
A ghost of a woman is picking random people and killing them after cutting one of their body parts.
1102	"Mahasangam - IV ^{†}"	13 July 2014
Tarot Card Reader Vishakha Sulekha had predicted Soham's death. Soham is murdered by a football player in Spice House Bungalow.
1103	"Corpse in the Locked Room"	18 July 2014
One of the most wanted thieves, Takiya well-known for opening any safe in the world, is murdered while opening one of the lockers kept in the room which was closed and had no ventilation of air.
1104	"The Secret of the Sudden Attack"	19 July 2014
Paranormalist Aliya is murdered in the haveli where a hotel was supposed to be constructed.
1105	"The Mystery of the Serial Killer"	20 July 2014
Just when Daya was about to express his feelings to Shreya, he receives a call and rushes to the spot where a murder had occurred in the house. On the other side, a couple Prashant and Prema were attacked by a serial killer.
1106	"Raaz Jungle Ke Bhoot Ka"	25 July 2014
3 brothers of an influential industrialist Lavanya mysteriously disappear while on a hiking trip.Just when the CID are thinking it as a normal trek-disappearance, the tour guide is mysteriously killed. Cops understand that the disappearance is well-planned. Thereafter, few more murder cases are reported around the same area. Local people claim that a witch who resides inside the forest is responsible for all the murders.
1107	"Salman Ki Kick: Part 1"	26 July 2014
Anna attacks the cops but disappears into the darkness when confronted by Abhijit and Daya. However they manage to recover the ghost Anna's lantern which she used while terrorizing and killing her victims. Meanwhile, Salman Khan, while promoting his movie, Kick, helps CID nab two criminals.
1108	"Salman Ki Kick: Part 2"	27 July 2014
The cops discover that Koyena is none other than Anna as they confront her. However, she tells them how she was forced by her husband Ashok do everything. The cops decide to trace Ashok which takes them to his forest cabin where they have an encounter with another stranger who turns out to be a hired private eye to trace Ashok himself. Salman makes ACP, Daya & Abhijit dance to his movie song.
1109	"Best Bus Murder"	1 August 2014
A journalist Arnab, boards the ‘BEST’ bus to his office. On the bus, he has a small altercation with another passenger, soon Arnab flies into a rage and he strangles the passenger and jumps out of the bus.
1110	"Glass Room Murder"	2 August 2014
The CID team is baffled when they are called to solve a crime in an impossible situation. A man - Ankush is shot in his cabin with his whole staff outside and not one of them being aware of this crime.
1111	"Missing Wife's Secret"	3 August 2014
Rahul is working peacefully at his home, right when a doorbell rings and a cook is there saying he was appointed by his wife Namrata.
1112	"Singham in CID - I"	8 August 2014
There is corruption charges levied against DCP Chitrole and DCP Singham has come to handle the case as it deals with black money.
1113	"Singham in CID - II"	9 August 2014
DCP Singham and CID cops manage to fight their way out of the trap and find that DCP Chitrole was framed to take the blame.
1114	"Singham in CID - III"	10 August 2014
Further investigation reveals that DCP Chittrole sold CID's plan to Marco. The police go with the flow to foil their own murder plan, arrest Marco, and the resort owner Anwesha who tried to kill police as revenge for the arrest of her brother in "Raaz Video Game Ka".
1115	"War of Independence - I"	15 August 2014
The team learns there is a planned terrorist attack on the Independence Day Parade in Mumbai. They investigate and learn more about it.
1116	"War of Independence - II"	16 August 2014
Team CID's mission to save the country on Independence Day continues.
1117	"Innocent at Risk - I"	22 August 2014
ACP Pradyuman who has been the guardian of the boy he saved (Bunty) from his psychotic sister Niharika in a previous case, has a new problem in hand.
1118	"Innocent at Risk - II"	23 August 2014
Rahul has nightmares of his father Vishal's death, which ACP understands is actually an unresolved murder.
1119	"Innocent at Risk - III"	24 August 2014
Team C.I.D succeed in arresting the kidnappers who have kidnapped Bunty and Rahul.
1120	"Abhijeet's Childhood"	29 August 2014
A man collapses and dies in the middle of a crowded street. Abhijeet realizes that the case could be connected to his past. However, he is kidnapped and is made to act like a child.
1121	"ACP in Danger"	30 August 2014
ACP is on the edge of a building as he is asked by the mysterious stranger to jump, or else innocents will lose lives.
1122	"Daya becomes Bride"	31 August 2014
Cops come across a case where one after one murder are happening at the wedding.
1123	"Kidnapping in Ganpati Utsav - I"	5 September 2014
The city is abuzz with Ganesha Chaturthi coming. The city streets are crowded with people flocking with beating drums and revelry.
1124	"Kidnapping in Ganpati Utsav - II"	6 September 2014
Team C.I.D has begun the investigation for searching Aanya who was abducted from the street during Ganesh Chaturthi festival in front of hundreds of people.
1125	"Kidnapping in Ganpati Utsav - III"	7 September 2014
The mysterious case of people being kidnapped from Ganesh Chaturthi festival continues. Just then CID starts receiving calls about random people disappearing suddenly from the city.
1126	"Attack on Bipasha"	12 September 2014
There is threat on Bipasha's life. While she is doing her regular workout in the gym, a goon attacks her but somehow, she manages to evade him and then complains to CID.
1127	"Video of Death"	13 September 2014
People in the city are dying under strange circumstances. The cops find out that each of them committed suicide in a certain manner.
1128	"Skeleton Mystery"	14 September 2014
Two thieves decided to hide the looted jewellery in a bungalow, and when they do so, they are in for a shock.
1129	"Death of a Kabaddi player - I"	19 September 2014
A famous kabaddi player named Vishal dies in the middle of a Kabaddi national level tournament.
1130	"Death of a Kabaddi player - II"	20 September 2014
The CID Team finds out that a bomb was planted in the locker to kill Vishal with a letter.
1131	"Theft of 40 crores"	21 September 2014
80 crores have been shifted to the main headquarters of ABCD bank in the city for transfer tomorrow.
1132	"Woman Power - I"	26 September 2014
Keerti learns that her social worker friend, Sakshi's life in danger and asks CID for help. Purvi, Shreya, and Tarika are kidnapped when they visit Sakshi's house for enquiry.
1133	"Woman Power - II"	27 September 2014
Keerti's husband was involved in child trafficking so he killed her. Sakshi killed her father-in-law and eloped from house.
1134	"Shreya's Engagement"	28 September 2014
On the engagement day of Shreya, her fiancé Siddharth is found missing and a dead body is found in his room.
1135	"Wish Fulfillment Mansion - I"	3 October 2014
In desperation to do top in exams, Amishtha arrives in Chanda's haveli to make a wish of coming first in the exams as she wants to defeat her competitor. Amishtha becomes terrifeid when she finds her competitor jumps from college terrace.
1136	"Wish Fulfillment Mansion - II"	4 October 2014
Amishtha falls in stairwell trap but CID finds there is no such staircase in that haveli. She visits forest late night after receiving foresights of her long lost father.
1137	"Corpse in Snow"	5 October 2014
Dr. Salunkhe's eyesight is lost in action when he followed a man who asked his help. He has heard 1 bullet sound but dead body has 2 bullet wounds, leaving him surprised.
1138	"Poisonous Hair"	10 October 2014
Dr. Salunkhe finds a clump of hair in the dead body which contains traces of poison but the hair did not belong to the victim, but someone else.
1139	"Strange Ladder"	11 October 2014
2 children have been kidnapped while their parents were away from home. CID team found dead body of girl in a car. In forensic, Dr. Salunkhe has only a ladder brought by the kidnappers to kidnap the kid.
1140	"Cryptic Medicine"	12 October 2014
Malini's root canal repaired by a dentist . After 2 months, her health detoriated and was admitted to a hospital. Her dead body found burnt in a car.
1141	"Bone Code"	17 October 2014
A puzzled piece of spinal cord is found in a public museum, ultimately giving challenge to Dr. Salunkhe.
1142	"Skull from the Sea"	18 October 2014
Investigation of a driftwood with a skull with deposition of various coloured sea salts, a murder and Dr. Tarika's kidnapping.
1143	"Finger-nail's Secret"	19 October 2014
Payal's car accident leads to a chopped finger and a burnt dead body whose DNA is difficult to find.
1144	"Daya Vs Daya"	24 October 2014
One morning, Abhijit is a bus conductor in a bus. ACP is a tea-samosa seller at a railway station. Daya wakes up in woods with a hazy memory of the night before.
1145	"10.45 Murder"	25 October 2014
A joker enters the hospital as he cries out that he's going to die ten minutes later.
1146	"Revenge"	26 October 2014
In a get-together, the host Anil is found dead in a room. And two other friends, Mohit and Gautam, are found unconscious in another room.
1147	"Phone Bhooth Murders"	31 October 2014
Two women swindle a man and are killed on the highway by a mystery killer.
1148	"Killer Bag"	1 November 2014
A young college going girl Preetika brings home a brown leather bag from a bus in which she has traveled.
1149	"Shikaari Ka Shikaar"	2 November 2014
Vipul, stressed, locks his wife Kiran in a room after hearing a doorbell ring. He receives a gun and a phone call. The man asks Vipul to shoot a man in a red cap. Hesitantly, he shoots but a woman comes in between and gets shot.
1150	"Innocent Baby's Mystery"	7 November 2014
A thief steals a baby girl, and her parents are found murdered. Cops find a baby boy in the house, who doesn't match the dead couple's DNA profile.
1151	"Why Owner becomes Thief?"	8 November 2014
A man runs into a mall to save his life from a woman who tries to shoot him. He was carrying some rare paintings. The next day, Dhanraj, is found dead in his living room, in the guise of a thief with the robbery of the same paintings.
1152	"Bai's Struggle"	9 November 2014
Shanti was trying to help Veronica, a victim of domestic violence. Veronica's husband Tarun realized that Shanti is danger to him and gets her arrested in a robbery case, but Veronica saved her. Eventually, Shanti is found murdered.
1153	"Faisal Par Hamla"	14 November 2014
The story centers around a popular dance reality show. Faisal is the top contender and star of the show. However, a lot of tension and ego battles are going on. Eventually, all the 3 judges are found dead. Faisal disappears and comes back. He doesn't react much to the news of the deaths.
1154	"Pied Piper"	15 November 2014
A number of robberies are taking place in the city and cops are surprised to find the culprits to be kids around ten years of age. A Pied Piper kind of a character is kidnapping children and using them to commit crimes.
1155	"Brave Kids"	16 November 2014
School kids playing cricket in the playground discover that terrorists have entered the premises and are holding teachers and kids as hostages. They manage to hide but get stuck in different rooms. They decide to call CID for help.
1156	"Happy Ending"	21 November 2014
Armaan and Yudi are discussing a script when Yudi notices that a young chap poisons a middle-aged person by putting some drops in his juice. The twist in the tale comes when forensics finds out that the man didn't die due to poisoning.
1157	"Mumbai Chawl"	22 November 2014
Vijay comes across a dying man Deepu who hands him a bag. His killers are after him and Vijay escapes. CID investigating Deepu's murder find out that he returned from Dubai. The killers realize that Vijay has the bag.
1158	"Murder in Chawl"	23 November 2014
Vinay and Kishore shoo away a man for assaulting Sheetal. She attempts suicide but fails. Next morning, Vinay is found dead in a tank.
1159	"Corpse in the Locked Room"	28 November 2014
Manish, a rich businessman checks in a 5-star hotel. Gunshots are heard and when CID arrive at the crime scene they find him dead. CID find out that the 3 adjacent rooms to Manish are all booked under false names as well as that of Manish.
1160	"Mahabali Shera ki Dahaad"	29 November 2014
Shera, a renowned wrestler has come to meet his childhood friend Suraj during his birthday party. He had called him for some urgent work. But Suraj suddenly suffers from brain hemorrhage and dies. Shera insists to the CID that it's a murder.
1161	"Ax Secret"	30 November 2014
A female thief breaks into a couples bungalow. When the wife enters the house coming back from late night party the thief hides under the table thats when she strikes her head. The couple finds an antique axe inside, takes it to the archaeologist to analyse its data. The archaeologist suspects something different and calls Dr Salunke for further inspection.
1162	"Action Jackson"	5 December 2014
Sameer is at his wedding reception where Ajay Devgn has come as a guest. He spots his parents and becomes upset. Meanwhile, the bride disappears and CID encounters a new CID officer named Jaywanti hired by DCP Chitrole.
1163	"Double Murder Conspiracy"	6 December 2014
Mansa leaves shopping complex and enters into her car, but in a meanwhile, someone shoots her in a shoulder. Whereas in a Business Awards, Viraj a businessman is shot dead after receiving an award. The CID team investigates and finds out that shooter was from the audience.
1164	"Bomb Blast"	7 December 2014
A car blast takes place on a deserted road and CID find 3 dead bodies. They realize that there were 3 more people at the blast site.
1165	"Human Without Head"	12 December 2014
Ravi, while returning from a party with his family, loses consciousness when he witnesses the bizarre sight of a headless biker on the highway. When he regains consciousness, his family was gone ! He contacts his friend Abhijit who reaches the spot. He too is in for a shock. The headless biker is in front of him and when he shoots at him, the biker is unhurt. The bullet just passes through him.
1166	"Haunted Haveli"	13 December 2014
Three girls go to a haveli that is considered haunted by the people of the colony. They call out for spirits and after spotting them run to their houses. The owner Suraj is called from America and he decides to sell it of but before he could do so, the broker goes missing after visiting the mansion.
1167	"Ghost Boat"	14 December 2014
Three friends are on a boat in the middle of the sea when they spot another boat where a girl is shot dead. An unknown man appears from the water and the three friends go missing.CID is informed about this and they are on the hunt for the three of them.
1168	"Chain Thief"	19 December 2014
Tulja Tai, fifty-year-old widow, lives alone in a rented flat in a Mumbai suburban society building and is known for her fearlessness & kindness. She is attacked in a temple by two assailants. The CID team's investigation relies heavily on the testimony of a blind beggar who witnessed the crime.
1169	"Micro Wave Gun"	20 December 2014
Rakesh and his wife throw a pool-side party on their 10th wedding anniversary. At the party, Rakesh gets into a heated argument with his business partner. They suddenly realize that their son, Bunty is missing and while looking for him, Rakesh mistakenly slips into the pool. When he starts drowning, people think he is fooling around as he is a known swimming champion, and fail to rescue him immediately, leading to his tragic death. CID team are called in to investigate the mysteriously drowning, unraveling a high-tech conspiracy.
1170	"Christmas Party"	26 December 2014
During a Christmas party, a man disguised as Santa enters and the host's daughter goes missing. Upon finding out they find the host's secretary dead, the CID believe the Santa to be the suspect.
1171	"Sher Ka Shikaar"	28 December 2014
Three children get separated from the rest during a school picnic by a tiger's roar in the forest. On investigation, C.I.D comes across an ex-forest inspector who had lost his mental stability and was off the grid for a couple of years. He informs them that there has been some tiger poaching going on.

^{†} Denotes crossover with Taarak Mehta Ka Ooltah Chashmah
