= Saahil Prem =

Indian entertainer (born 20th century)

- Born: Mumbai, Maharashtra, India
- Education: St. Peter's School, Panchgani; Sheffield Hallam University (UK)
- Occupations: Actor, director, writer, DJ, composer

Saahil Prem (born 23 August) is an Indian Bollywood actor, director, writer, DJ and composer.

He is known for playing the lead opposite Sunny Leone in the film Ragini MMS 2 (2014) and directing, writing and acting in one of India's first dance films Mad About Dance (2014).

== Early life and education ==
Born in Chembur, a suburb in central Mumbai, Saahil went to St. Peter's School, a boarding school in Panchgani. He then attended Sheffield Hallam University in South Yorkshire, England. He became the resident DJ for his university.

== Career ==
He moved to London where he took up residency at Mangos, one of the best Asian clubs in London.

After playing at clubs and events across Europe, Saahil moved to Mumbai and did a three-month acting course at Actor Prepares. He then joined the film director Vipul Shah as his assistant for the romance film Namastey London (2007).

He decided to start writing his dance film Mad About Dance, which he also directed and acted in as the male lead opposite Amrit Maghera. He also played the lead opposite Sunny Leone in Ragini MMS 2 (2014) from Balaji Motion Pictures.

Saahil released his first single, a progressive track called "The Tour" on iTunes and other digital platforms.

== Filmography ==
| Year | Title | Role |
|---|---|---|
| 2014 | Mad About Dance | Aarav |
| 2014 | Ragini MMS 2 | Satya |
| 2017 | Shabhash Kundu | Kabir |

== See also ==
- List of club DJs
- List of Indian actors
- List of Indian composers
- List of Indian film directors
- List of Indian writers
