= Amy Maghera =

British model and actress

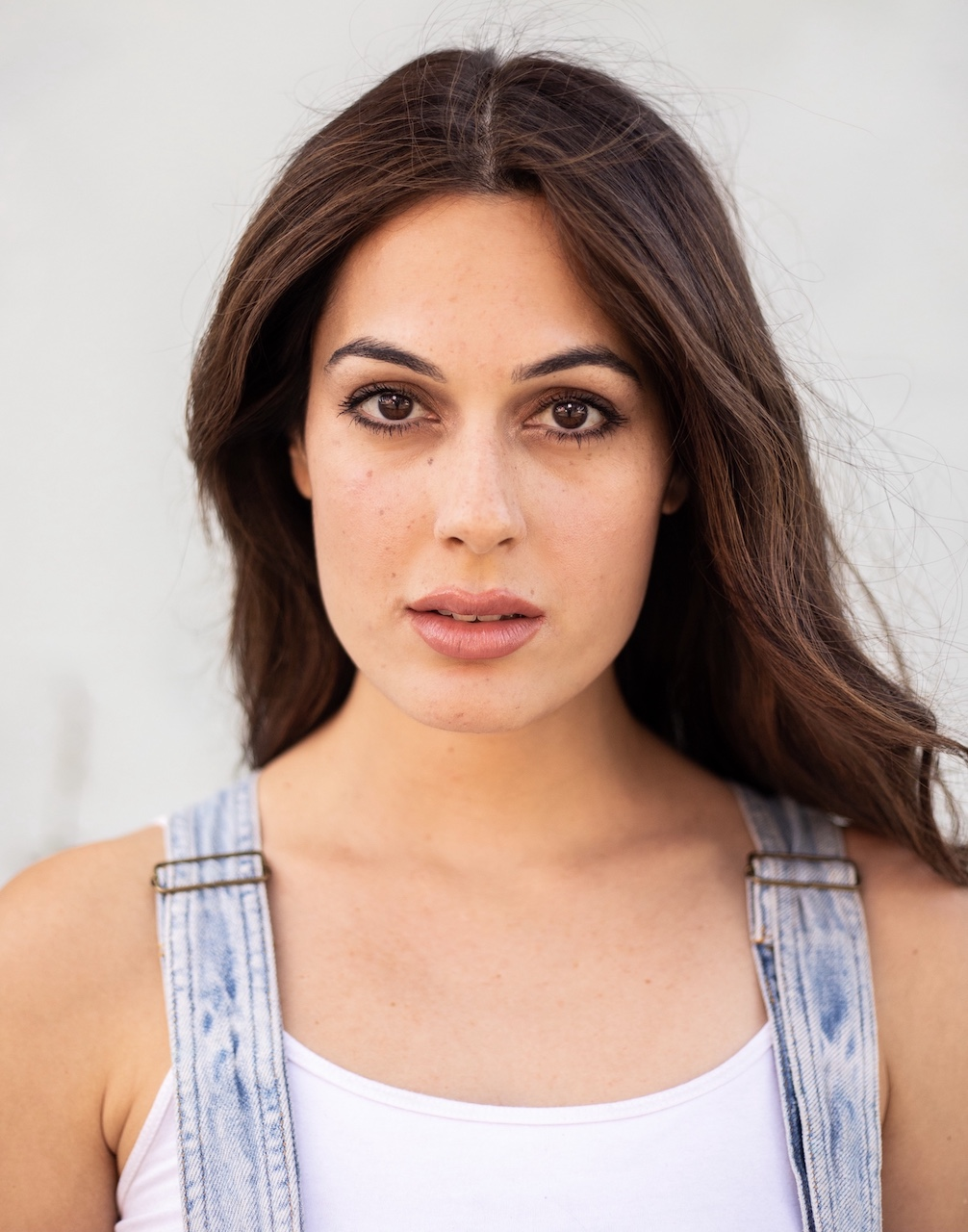
- Maghera in 2021
- Born: Amrit Maghera
- Citizenship: United Kingdom
- Education: University of Winchester
- Occupations: Model; actress
- Years active: 2008–present
- Television: Hollyoaks

Amy Maghera (born Amrit Maghera) (Note: Her birth name is Amrit, but she announced her name change to Amy in March 2021. To reflect this, the article will refer to her as Amy.) is an English model and actress, working in Hindi, English and Punjabi films. From 2015 to 2017, she appeared in the British soap opera Hollyoaks as Neeta Kaur.

== Early life ==
Maghera was born to an Indian mother and an English-Scottish father and grew up in Milton Keynes, Buckinghamshire. Maghera studied at the University of Winchester.

== Career ==
Maghera began her career as a dancer for the likes of Kanye West and Guns N' Roses. She was working as a background dancer on the sets of a Bollywood film in Mumbai when she was scouted by a modelling agency bringing in a five-year contract with Lakme, India's highest top end cosmetic company as its brand ambassador. She also featured as a backing dancer for the £1 Fish song by One Pound Fish Man in December 2012. This launched her career in modelling as she went on to do assignments with reputed brands like Satya Paul, Miss Sixty, L’Oreal, Skechers, Nokia and Olay among others, besides participating in fashion shows with designers like Alison Kanugo and Neeta Lulla. In 2014, she appeared in Mad About Dance. She also did the lead vocals for the film. A Punjabi film Goreyan Nu Daffa Karo with singer Amrinder Gill followed soon after.

In April 2015, a British-Asian film featuring her, Amar Akbar & Tony, was released in the United Kingdom. She then acted alongside Sandhya Mridul, Tannishtha Chatterjee, Sarah-Jane Dias and Anushka Manchanda in the 2015 film Angry Indian Goddesses, a film which marked the debut of Pan Nalin in mainstream Hindi cinema. In October 2015, Maghera joined the cast of the Channel 4 soap opera, Hollyoaks as Neeta Kaur. She departed the serial in November 2017 after her character was killed off. Her death scene was nominated for Best Show-Stopper at the 2018 Inside Soap Awards.

== Personal life ==
On 31 March 2021, she uploaded a post on Instagram stating that she had legally changed her forename from Amrit to Amy. She stated that Amy has been a lifelong nickname for her, and that she is equally "proud of my mixed heritage - Indian and White". Her name change was not to turn her back on any culture, as she also stated in the post that she is maintaining her mother's Indian surname Maghera.

== Filmography ==
Year	Film	Role	Language	Notes
2008	Yuvvraaj	Shazia	Hindi	Credited as Aimee Maghera
2014	Goreyan Nu Daffa Karo	Alisha	Punjabi	With Amrinder Gill as male lead
2014	Mad About Dance	Aashira Qureshi	Hindi	Also singer
2014	The Shaukeens		Hindi	Special Appearance in the song "Meherbani"
2015	Angry Indian Goddesses	'Jo' Joanna	Hindi	
2015	Amar Akbar & Tony		English	A British-Asian film
2015–2017	Hollyoaks	Neeta Kaur	English	Series regular
2018	Casualty	Nadia Badhir	English	1 episode
2021	Skater Girl	Jessica	Hindi and English	Feature film
