= Challo Driver =

2012 film

Challo Driver (transl. 'Come on driver') is Hindi movie released on 20 July 2012, produced by Ronicka Kandhari and starring Kainaz Motivala, Vickrant Mahajan, Prem Chopra, Manoj Pahwa, Tariq Vasudeva, Juhi Pande and Silky Khanna.

== Plot ==
The film stars Prem Chopra as Arjun Kapoor's (Vickrant Mahajan) grandfather. He (Prem) wants someone to come into his grandson's life who would change his life completely. Arjun is very strict by nature and changes his driver five times a month. This behaviour makes Prem upset. But suddenly a female driver, Tanya (Kainaz Motivala), comes into his life, and the whole story changes, respectively. At last, Arjun marries the female driver, and the story ends successfully.

== Soundtrack ==
No.	Title	Singer(s)	Length
1.	"Kudi Pataki Driver"	Mika Singh, Hard Kaur, Gaurav Dayal
2.	"Dehle Pa Gulla"	Labh Janjua, Gaurav Dayal
3.	"Wakhre Wakhre Kaam"	Aditi Veena, Gaurav Dayal
4.	"Umangon Ka Karwan"	Shaan, Raktima
5.	"Iftefaq Hai Dastaan Hai"	Shubhankar Dutta

== Reception ==
The movie got overall average reviews with Times of India reviewer Madhureeta Mukherjee giving it two stars. A review in DNA India was negative about the production.
