= Kainaz Motivala =

Indian actress

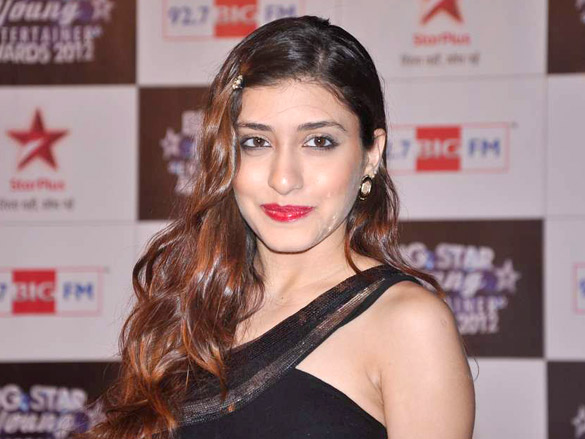
- Kainaz Motivala at the BIG STAR Young Entertainer Awards 2012
- Born: Mumbai, Maharashtra, India
- Occupation: Actress
- Years active: 2009-2014
- Spouse: Urvaksh Doctor (m. 2013)

Kainaz Motivala is an Indian actress who has appeared in Hindi films. Her acting career started with a small role in Wake Up Sid as Tanya in 2009. She was signed for the role Shailey in the 2010 Bollywood film Paathshala.

In 2011, she performed as the lead female character for the horror-thriller film Ragini MMS. She has also appeared in few Indian television commercials like Uninor, McDonald's, Videocon Mobile Phone and Sony Pix Promo. Motivala has been trained by Shiamak Davar for six years.

Her mother tongue is Gujarati.

== Personal life ==
Kainaz married Urvaksh Doctor in a Parsi ceremony on 28 November 2013. A daughter was born to them in 2016.

== Filmography ==
Year	Film	Role	Notes
2009	Wake Up Sid	Tanya Lathia	Debut Film
2010	Paathshaala	Shailey	
2011	Ragini MMS	Ragini	
2012	Challo Driver	Tanya Malhotra	
2014	Ragini MMS 2	Ragini	Cameo appearance
2014	Boochamma Boochodu	Sravani	Telugu Film

== Television ==
Year	Serial	Role	Notes
2011	Kismat	Tanya/ Zulekha Kabir Khan	Nawab Kabir Mubarak Khan's daughter
