= Boochamma Boochodu =

2014 film

- Theatrical release poster
- Directed by: Revan Yadu
- Written by: Sai Krishna
- Produced by: Ramesh Annamreddy; Prasad Reddy
- Starring: Sivaji; Kainaz Motivala
- Cinematography: Vijay Mishra
- Edited by: Prawin Pudi
- Music by: Shekar Chandra
- Production companies: Hezen Entertainments; Sneha Cinema
- Release date: 5 September 2014
- Country: India
- Language: Telugu

Boochamma Boochodu is a 2014 Indian Telugu-language horror comedy film directed by Rewan Yadu. The film features a honeymooning couple, Karthik (Shivaji) and Sravani (Kainaaz Motiwala), in their new farm house are punctuated by an aberration - ominous signs of the palatial house. The mysterious of the terrorizing spirits form the storyline.

== Cast ==
- Sivaji as Kartik
- Kainaz Motivala as Sravani
- Brahmanandam as Charan, Kartik's uncle
- Posani Krishna Murali as Tantrik
- Vennela Kishore
- Srinivasa Reddy
- Venu Yeldandi
- Thagubothu Ramesh
- Chammak Chandra as Yadagiri
- Ravi Varma
- Chitram Srinu

== Soundtrack ==
All lyrics are written by Sri Mani.

No.	Title	Singer(s)	Length
1.	"Ee Kshaname Oka"	Sai Charan, Harseks
2.	"Yem Jarigindho"	Bhargavi Pillai, Sai Charan
3.	"Oh Cheliya Idhi"	Sekhar Chandra

== Reception ==
Times of India wrote "The director has mixed some humour in the horror, which is not so horrifying. Moreover, films with similar subjects have been attempted earlier. But this is not to take away from the director the twists he adds to the story. It's exactly not edge of the seat excitement but your sure will be curious to know if Karthik and Shravani survive August 15".
