= Mad About Dance =

M.A.D - Mad About Dance
- Directed by: Saahil Prem
- Written by: Saahil Prem
- Starring: Saahil Prem; Amrit Maghera; Salah Benlemqawanssa; Akhilesh Unnithan; Raashul Tondon; Abhishek Saha; Mark Monero
- Cinematography: Uday Tiwari
- Edited by: Meghna Manchanda Sen
- Music by: Vidyadhar Bhave; Dr. Zeus; Saahil Prem; Sangeet Haldipur; Siddharth Haldipur-(Sangeet-Siddharth)
- Release date: 22 August 2014
- Country: India
- Language: Hindi

Mad About Dance is a 2014 Indian dance film. The film is directed by Saahil Prem. The film stars Saahil Prem and Amrit Maghera.

Essentially a dance film, it focuses on the youth, their dreams, anxieties, disappointments and hopes for their future. The film is based in the university town of Sheffield and brings to light the stories of Asian students who leave their home and country and go to study abroad, their struggles, heartbreaks, trials and triumphs.

== Cast ==
- Saahil Prem ... Aarav
- Amrit Maghera ... Aashira
- Salah Benlemqawanssa ... AJ
- Akilesh Unnitan ... Atul
- Abhishek Saha ... Dipen
- Raashul Tandon ... GG
- Jon Jo Jon Jo ... Henry
- Kiyani Aziz ... Salim
- Sandeep Garcha ... Mrs. Qureshi
- Helen Grayson ... Dance Support
- Emiko Ishii ... Amy
- Emma Jones ... Announcer
- Mark Monero ... Ceaser
- Ameet Panesar ... Wagz
- Sumeet Panesar ... Jagz

== Soundtrack ==
| No. | Title | Music | Singer(s) | Length |
|---|---|---|---|---|
| 1. | "Ishq Da Bukhar" | Vidyadhar Bhave | Krishna Beura & Amrit Maghera |
| 2. | "Party Is Going Mad" | Sangeet-Siddharth | Sangeet-Siddharth ft Divya Kumar, Vidyadhar Bhave |
| 3. | "Kahan Hai Khuda" | Saahil Prem | Subhan Pradhan |
| 4. | "Punjabi Mundeya" | Dr. Zeus | Ravindra Upadhyay, Lil' Shorty |
| 5. | "Kahan Hai Khuda" (Dubstep) | Saahil Prem | Vidyadhar Bhave |
| 6. | "Kahan Hai Khuda" (Remix) | Saahil Prem | Vidyadhar Bhave |
