= Ragini MMS 2 =

2014 Indian film by Bhushan Patel

- Theatrical release poster
- Directed by: Bhushan Patel
- Produced by: Shobha Kapoor; Ekta Kapoor
- Starring: Sunny Leone; Saahil Prem; Parvin Dabbas; Karan Veer Mehra; Sandhya Mridul; Divya Dutta; Anita Hassanandani; Shriyog Rithe; Karan Taluja; Jeevan
- Music by: Songs: Chirantan Bhatt; Meet Bros Anjjan; Yo Yo Honey Singh; Pranay Rijia; Background Score: Amar Mohile
- Production companies: Balaji Motion Pictures; ALT Entertainment; Mehra Entertainment
- Distributed by: Balaji Motion Pictures; White Hill Studios (North America)
- Release date: 21 March 2014
- Running time: 119 minutes
- Country: India
- Language: Hindi
- Budget: ₹19 crore (US$2.0 million)
- Box office: ₹63.29 crore (US$6.6 million)

Ragini MMS 2 is a 2014 Indian erotic horror thriller film directed by Bhushan Patel and produced by Shobha Kapoor and Ekta Kapoor under Balaji Motion Pictures and ALT Entertainment. The movie is the sequel to the 2011 horror movie Ragini MMS. Ragini MMS 2 features Sunny Leone and Saahil Prem in lead roles in a continuation of the plot from the prequel. Unlike the first film, the movie is not shot in found footage format. The film received an A certificate. The film was a major commercial success, being declared a hit at the box office, and catapulting Sunny as a mainstream actress.

== Plot ==
The film begins where the previous film ended. Ragini, since the incident in the first film, has been at Thane Mental Asylum, and even there she has been haunted by the ghost of the previous film. Meanwhile, Ragini's MMS tape has gone viral - along with rumours of the house's haunted nature, where the MMS was filmed. This catches the attention of a sleazy director, Rocks (Parvin Dabas) who decides to make a movie about the haunting. He signs an ex-porn star, Sunny Leone (Sunny Leone) as the lead actress and decides to shoot the movie in the same house where the MMS was recorded.

Sunny, who takes an instant liking to the script, seeks permission to meet the real Ragini (Kainaz Motivala), to get a better in-depth understanding of the character she wants to portray. But the meeting goes horribly wrong when Ragini stabs herself brutally in the neck.

Later, the cast and crew arrive at the haunted house to shoot and strange things begin to happen, especially to Sunny. Elsewhere, Dr. Meera Dutta (Divya Dutta), a psychiatrist who specialises in cases for which science has no answers, takes up Ragini's case. After going through old newspaper clippings and video tapes of Ragini, she finds the truth regarding the haunting.

She finds out that the ghost haunting the house was a married woman with two daughters and a son. She loved her son more than her daughters since she had conceived him after much difficulty and prayer. One day, the boy and his two sisters were playing hide and seek when the boy slipped into a well and drowned. This drove his mother insane and caused her to embark on a desperate quest to resurrect him from the dead. A Baba who claimed to perform black magic arrived and convinced her the only way to bring her son back was to sacrifice both of her daughters. The insane mother agreed and the Baba chopped off the daughters' heads. He put the sword in her hands, told her to close her eyes, and chant. While she did that he stole all of her money and ran away. When the villagers finally arrived, they assumed that the mother was practising witchcraft and punished her by hanging her from a tree, stoning her, and burning her alive. The woman survived, finally dropped from the tree, and after cursing them all, killed herself by stabbing herself in the neck with the rattle-toy her son used to play with.

Dr. Dutta then rushes to the shooting location to inform the cast and crew to abandon their shooting and leave the house immediately. But it is too late as the ghost has already possessed Sunny and started killing the film's cast and crew by either luring them into having sex or by catching them off guard. Only the scriptwriter Satya (Saahil Prem) and actress Monali (Sandhya Mridul) are left alive.

As Dr. Dutta, Monali and Satya attempt to drive the ghost out of Sunny, Monali gets killed. Afterwards, when Satya accidentally steps on the rattle toy with which the woman committed suicide prior to becoming a ghost, it causes Sunny temporary pain, and thereby forces the ghost to temporarily leave Sunny. Dr. Dutta realises the toy's importance and urges Satya to destroy it. Eventually the ghost is destroyed along with the rattle. Sunny, Satya and Dr. Dutta leave the house, having exorcised the ghost and solving the mystery behind the haunting. At the end of the movie a rocking chair is shown rocking back and forth and a child's voice is heard, implying that there is still a ghost in the house.

== Cast ==
- Sunny Leone as herself
- Saahil Prem as Satya Kumar
- Anita Hassanandani as Gina
- Sandhya Mridul as Monali
- Karan Veer Mehra as Maddy
- Parvin Dabas as Rocks
- Divya Dutta as Dr. Meera Dutta
- Karan Taluja as Kunal Khanna
- Geetanjali Kulkarni as the Witch / Ghost
- Kainaz Motivala as Ragini (Cameo)
- Yo Yo Honey Singh - special appearance in song "Chaar Botal Vodka"
- Shilpa Gandhi Mohile as Doctor (in a special appearance)

== Production ==
Sunny Leone, who plays female lead in Ragini MMS 2, says this movie is more commercial in nature than its prequel. Director Bhushan Patel says that there is a lot more sex, scares and a lot of glamour with the songs. The movie was scheduled to be released in the month of October 2013. However, Balaji Motion Pictures officially confirmed the release date, scheduled to be on 17 January 2014. The release date of the film was further postponed to 21 March 2014.

== Soundtrack ==
The soundtrack of Ragini MMS 2 is composed by Meet Bros Anjjan, Yo Yo Honey Singh, Pranay Rijia and Chirrantan Bhatt. The soundtrack was released through T-Series on 7 March 2014, with the songs "Baby Doll" and "Chaar Botal Vodka" becoming chartbusters.

== Release ==
=== Critical reception ===
Madhureeta Mukherjee of the Times of India rated the movie 3.5 out 5 and said, "The film provides the usual creepy cliches – creaking windows, ghostly shadows and bedraggled ghosts. There are a few spooky moments, but fewer leap-out-of-your-seat scenes. Sunny looks deathly desirable and plays the sexed-up baby doll with abandon. While her 'act' is good, her 'performance' doesn't really climax. Yet, she gives us a 'drool-worthy' adult-horror film – one of its kind for Bollywood."

Shubhra Gupta of The Indian Express rated the movie 2.5 out 5 stating, "Despite its harum-scarum script and barely-there logic, I quite enjoyed 'Ragini MMS 2' in the portions when Sunny Leone is in full stride.Where it falters is in the lack of novelty in the scenes that feature the spirit, and its bloody trail: there are a couple of scenes that send a shiver down your spine, but then it all becomes familiar. A little more attention to that, and to the storyline, and this will become a solid franchise."

Namita Karkera of Rediff.com gave the film a score of 1.5 out of 5 noting, "Sunny Leone looks hot alright but with scary scenes being average at best, Ragini MMS 2 isn't half as scary as it is supposed to be. At best, the film seems like a spoof. The second half of the movie however fares better. Overall the movie still manages to scare at some shots, make us laugh and enjoy Sunny Leone in her skimpy outfits."

== Box office ==
=== Domestic ===
Ragini MMS 2 had a very strong opening day with the film collecting 80 million despite competition from T20 World Cup but somehow managed an opening weekend of 240 million.

== Awards and nominations ==
Award	Category	Recipients and nominees	Result	Ref.
7th Mirchi Music Awards	Female Vocalist of The Year	Kanika Kapoor - "Baby Doll"	Nominated	
7th Mirchi Music Awards	Upcoming Female Vocalist of The Year	Kanika Kapoor - "Baby Doll"	Nominated	
7th Mirchi Music Awards	Best Song Engineer (Recording & Mixing)	Gautam Chakraborty, Uddipan Sharma & Eric Pillai - "Baby Doll"	Nominated	
7th Mirchi Music Awards	Best Song Producer (Programming & Arranging)	Bharat Goel & Meet Bros Anjjan - "Baby Doll"	Won	
