= Satya Paul =

Indian Fashion Company

- Industry: Fashion
- Founded: 1985
- Founder: Satya Paul
- Headquarters: Gurgaon, Haryana, India
- Key people: Satya Paul; Puneet Nanda; Sanjay Kapoor
- Products: Fashion clothing & accessories, Sari
- Owner: Genesis Colors Private Limited

Satya Paul was an Indian designer label known for Indian prints founded on 1 April 1985. The brand is now present across India. It was founded by designer Satya Paul and helmed by Sanjay Kapoor (Founder - Genesis Luxury) along with Paul's son Puneet Nanda (Creative Director of Satya Paul till 2010).

The founder of the label, Satya Paul, died in Coimbatore on January 6, 2021.

== Products ==
The Satya Paul product line comprises women's designer wear mostly saris, kurtas, handbags, clutches and scarves, and men's accessories such as neck ties, belts, wallets, pocket squares and cufflinks.

== Design Collaborations for a Cause ==
Satya Paul joined hands for Women's Cancer Initiative with the Tata Memorial Centre Hospital of Mumbai for the Think Pink-Awareness Campaign for Breast Cancer. The project was the brainchild of Mumbai socialite and philanthropist Devieka Bhojwani, who battled and survived breast cancer. A special collection, 'Ray of Hope' was developed as well to represent the strength and struggle of women fighting cancer.

In 2006 the brand collaborated with WWF to launch the Endangered Species collection.

In 2003, Satya Paul metamorphosed four of S.H. Raza's paintings and reproduced them as limited edition silk scarves.
