= Ragini MMS =

2011 Indian film by Pawan Kirpalani

- Theatrical release poster
- Directed by: Pavan Kirpalani
- Screenplay by: Pawan Kirpalani; Vaspar Dandiwala
- Story by: Pawan Kirpalani
- Produced by: Ekta Kapoor; Shobha Kapoor; Amit Kapoor; Sidhartha M. Jain
- Starring: Rajkummar Rao; Kainaz Motivala
- Cinematography: Tribhuvan Babu Sadineni
- Edited by: Pooja Ladha Surti
- Music by: Shamir Tandon; S D Burman; Bappi Lahri; Faizan Hussain; Agnel Roman
- Distributed by: ALT Entertainment; Balaji Motion Pictures iRock Films; ZEE5
- Release date: 13 May 2011
- Running time: 93 minutes
- Country: India
- Language: Hindi
- Budget: ₹13 crore (US$1.39 million)
- Box office: ₹90 crore (US$9.61 million)

Ragini MMS is a 2011 Indian found-footage horror film directed by Pawan Kripalani and produced by Jeetendra and Shobha Kapoor of Balaji Telefilms. It was released on 13 May 2011 (Friday the 13th). The film is inspired by the 2007 American supernatural horror film Paranormal Activity and is partly based on the real story of a girl from Delhi named Deepika.

== Plot ==
The whole film is shot as a homemade movie, starting with Uday arriving at Ragini's home. After asking Uday where they are heading and getting no response, Ragini's friend, Pia, gets upset and wants Uday to leave their house immediately. Uday pays no heed to her, wakes Ragini up from her sleep, and tells her to get ready for their weekend getaway. They then travel to Uday's 'house' – a mysterious abandoned building at a deserted location. Ragini's mom calls her to ask her whereabouts, but Ragini lies and hangs up.

It is revealed that Uday is involved in the business of making and selling sex tapes of innocent girls. This time the victim is Ragini, who thinks that he loves her. They try to have sex, but are interrupted by Pia and her boyfriend Vishal visiting them. Furious by their visit, Uday tells Ragini to get rid of them, but they end up staying for a while.

Vishal asks Uday for the way to the bathroom and Uday tells him. Vishal tells Uday that a woman previously lived in the house, who was called a witch by her family. The family killed her, following which her spirit murdered them and has since been haunting the house. Uday laughs at this story and walks away. Vishal hesitantly makes his way back to the living room but senses someone behind him.

Someone knocks on the main door. When Uday opens, Vishal stumbles in with a wound on his neck. Sensing that something is wrong with the house, Pia and Vishal leave in a hurry. Afterwards, Uday turns on the cameras without informing Ragini and handcuffs her to the bed. They are about to have sex but Uday is pulled away by his hair. He checks the whole house, during which the door which Vishal had gone through opens inexplicably.

Now afraid, Uday checks the room and house thoroughly but finds no one. They hear some strange sounds and Uday says in Marathi, "I am not a witch." He again goes out to check the source of the noise. He returns in a strange and frightened condition. Ragini immediately asks Uday to release her, but he is scared and unable to think. While searching for the keys, Uday accidentally reveals the camera he was using to film them having sex, to which Ragini reacts with terror, shock and anger.

Uday tries to unlock Ragini's handcuffs with other items but suddenly he becomes paranoid. He picks up a pointed object, stabs himself in the neck, and dies. Terrified, Ragini screams for help but no one hears her. She tries to search for the keys herself, but in vain. She tries to break the bed post, but fails. Ragini finds a piece of glass, cuts her hand, and uses the blood as a lubricant to break free.

Once free, she tries to escape from the house, but the doors keep closing on her. She screams for help, alerting some passersby, who are however unable to help. Ragini is pulled into the same closet where she finds a dead body. She makes a run for the car. She breaks open the car's window and pulls Vishal's body out, but is unable to start the car. She again runs through the jungle and hides in a spot where she finds Pia's body. Eventually the spirit pulls her by her hair back into the house.

The spirit hangs Ragini to a wall for many days. The film ends in a way that is left for interpretation. In the end, a man finds Ragini unconscious and she had to undergo psychiatric treatment for 10 months. The story is open ended and acts as a warning for naive girls to be extra cautious when dealing with shady people.

== Cast ==
- Kainaz Motivala as Ragini
- Rajkummar Rao as Uday
- Rajat Paul as Vishal Saxena
- Janice as Piya
- Shernaz as Neha
- Vinod Rawat as Jigar
- Harshraj Shroff as Friend 1
- Cristy Philips as Friend 2
- M. Ravichandran Thevar as Friend 3
- Mangala White as Ghost Spirit
- Indu Poddar as Gopal’s Lover

== Production ==
The film was originally titled Raginni MMS but a numerologist advised Ekta Kapoor to change it to Ragini MMS. The film took only 25 days to shoot. A total of six cameras were used to shoot the film including a Canon 7D, an Arri Alexa and a Handycam. The size of the total footage shot was around 2.5 terabytes. The movie was released on VCD and DVD. The Satellite distribution rights were given to Hindi general entertainment channel Sahara One.

== Release ==
The producer of the film, Ekta Kapoor, promoted her movie in an episode of Sony Entertainment Television's CID, which was aired coincidentally with the movie's release. The film had a midnight première on 13 May 2011 in Pune. The film opened to a very good response in its first week, grossing ₹ 77.5 million. It was steady during its second week and grossed ₹ 99.4 million at the end of its second week. The film recovered its cost within two days of release.

== Reception ==
Upon release, the film met with mixed reviews.

Taran Adarsh from Bollywood Hungama gave it 4/5 stars and called it a "creepy, spine-chilling date movie" saying, "Ragini MMS amalgamates components of horror, paranormal and sex seamlessly. It titillates, it petrifies, but most importantly, it tells you a story which is daunting, imaginative and unconventional."

Naresh Deoshi from Apunka Choice also gave the film 4/5 stars calling it "a damn scary film!"

Ankur Pathak from Rediff.com gave the film 3.5/5 stars and said "Ekta Kapoor's new film is terrifyingly real, and immensely watchable for the cold fright it inspires. She must be lauded for relying on young actors, and believing in the risky attempt of largely untouched storytelling."

Nikhat Kazmi from the Times of India gave the film 3.5/5 stars as well. She said "...Ragini MMS makes a heady cocktail of sex and horror that's so very different from run-of-the-mill Bollywood."

Shubha Shetty-Saha gave the film a good review of 3/5 and said "some scenes were so scary, that I actually wanted to run out of the theatre."

Mayank Shekhar from the Hindustan Times gave the film 2/5 stars, while Pankaj Sabnani from Glamsham gave the film an average review of 2.5/5 saying "Ragini MMS isn't worth 'circulating', if you have a large appetite for horror."

Aniruddha Guha from DNA gave the film 2/5 saying, "Watch Ragini MMS only if you dig cheap thrills. But don't worry about losing sleep thereafter."

== Awards ==
Best Searchlight Film – Ekta Kapoor

== Soundtrack ==
Ragini MMS

Soundtrack album
- Released: 19 April 2011
- Genre: Film soundtrack
- Label: Saregama

The music is composed by S. D. Burman, Shamir Tandon, Faizan Hussain, Agnel Roman, and Bappi Lahiri. The soundtrack for the film was released on 19 April 2011. It consists of only four songs, including the hit song "Raat Akeli Hai" from the 1967 film, Jewel Thief. Erik Satie's Gymnopedie No. 1 is also heard in pieces in this film.

=== Track listing ===
| No. | Title | Music | Singer(s) | Length |
|---|---|---|---|---|
| 1. | "Itne Kareeb Aao" | Shamir Tandon | Raaj J. Konwar | 3:55 |
| 2. | "Raat Akeli Hai" | S. D. Burman | Asha Bhosle | 5:17 |
| 3. | "Ragini" | Faizan Hussain, Agnel Roman | Faizan Hussain, Agnel Roman | 3:27 |
| 4. | "You Are My Chicken Fry" (Remix) | Bappi Lahiri | Bappi Lahiri, Shweta Shetty | 4:07 |

== Sequel ==
A sequel to the movie, Ragini MMS 2 was made and released on 21 March 2014. Continuing the story, the sequel focused on a film crew who went back to the haunted house to shoot a film on the infamous Ragini MMS scandal. It was directed by Bhusan Patel.

== See also ==
- Found footage (pseudo-documentary)
- DPS MMS scandal, 2004 event that inspired some similar films
