= List of CID episodes: 1998–2009 =

Classified Episodes

The following is a list of episodes from the series CID aired from 1998 to 2009.

For episodes aired from 2010 to 2014, see the List of CID episodes: 2010–2014.

For episodes aired from 2015 to 2018, see the List of CID episodes: 2015–2018.

For episodes airing from 2024, see the List of CID episodes: 2024–2025.

== 1998 ==
Episode	Title	Original release date
1	"The Case of Poison (Part - 1)"	21 January 1998
A prominent lawyer is found dead in his posh high-end residence.
2	"The Case of Poison (Concluding part)"	28 January 1998
Following up on the lawyer and the CID Officer's mysterious death, ACP Pradyuman and his team manage to get some leads and inch closer to the suspect.
3	"The Case of Mysterious Voices (Part - 1)"	4 February 1998
The Police find an abandoned dead body and immediately become suspicious. They react quickly and hand the case over to the CID.
4	"The Case of Mysterious Voices (Concluding part)"	11 February 1998
Finding a piece of evidence in a sea of audio recordings is like finding a needle in a haystack.
5	"The Case of the Night Hunter (Part - 1)"	18 February 1998
A series of murders within a quick span of time shocks the entire neighborhood.
6	"The Case of the Night Hunter (Concluding part)"	25 February 1998
The mystery of the serial killer deepens when one of the prime suspects commits suicide, the crazy professor lives up to his reputation and takes his own life.
7	"The Case of the Thief Within (Part - 1)"	11 March 1998
A string of robberies startle the city.
8	"The Case of the Thief Within (Concluding part)"	18 March 1998
With the possible involvement of his son, in this case, ACP needs to take some hard-hitting decisions.
9	"The Case of the Third Man (Part - 1)"	25 March 1998
A waiter walks into a hotel room and finds a couple dead inside. The CID team is promptly called into action.
10	"The Case of the Third Man (Concluding part)"	1 April 1998
The mystery of the third missing individual continues, all we know is the involvement of a deadly mixture of alcohol and poison.
11	"The Case of the Second Statement (Part - 1)"	8 April 1998
A victim releases a statement in front of the doctors and the police that the attempted murder on her was actually a careless mistake and there was nobody responsible for this accident.
12	"The Case of the Second Statement (Concluding part)"	15 April 1998
With investigation hitting a plateau and no further lead in sight, the team decides to backtrack and consult a doctor.
13	"The Case of the Contract Killer (Part - 1)"	22 April 1998
Pedestrians on the road find a dying man crying for help.
14	"The Case of the Contract Killer (Concluding part)"	29 April 1998
Childhood rivalries often leave marks that are deep and hurtful, this seems to be the case with Nagesh and Vilas.
15	"The Case of the Anonymous Threats (Part - 1)"	6 May 1998
A family receives anonymous threats from a gang out of nowhere. * First episode with Senior Inspector Daya
16	"The Case of the Anonymous Threats (Concluding part)"	13 May 1998
The threats continue but this time the team has audio recordings to analyze.
17	"The Case of the Incomplete Letter (Part - 1)"	20 May 1998
A lady finds parts of a letter stuck on her window. The letter was signed by Pawan Kumar pleading for help.
18	"The Case of the Incomplete Letter (Concluding part)"	27 May 1998
A woman gets one part of a mysterious letter and goes to the CID for their help. ACP tries his best to crack the case.
19	"The Case of the Innocent Victim (Part - 1)"	3 June 1998
A night of celebration suddenly turns horrid when Ajay and the coach collapse after drinking some champagne out of a bottle.
20	"The Case of the Innocent Victim (Concluding part)"	10 June 1998
As investigations progress on the arsenic poisoning case, Sr. Inspector Viren tries to narrow down on the culprit with the help of Dr Salunke.
21	"The Case of the Last Wound (Part - 1)"	17 June 1998
A hemophilic patient believes that his life could be in danger. He fears his wife is having an extramarital affair and wants him dead.
22	"The Case of the Last Wound (Concluding part)"	24 June 1998
Succumbing to his injuries, Sudhakar passes away after falling off the staircase.
23	"The Case of the Deadly Virus (Part - 1)"	1 July 1998
A lethal virus is let loose due to internal conflict at a pharmaceutical company. A virus deadly enough to spread through an entire city within 8 hours.
24	"The Case of the Deadly Virus (Concluding part)"	8 July 1998
With the virus in the hands of a hardened criminal, the future of the city was in the hands of a lunatic.
25	"The Case of the Burnt Letter (Part - 1)"	15 July 1998
An old man living alone in his apartment is choked to death by an unknown assailant.
26	"The Case of the Burnt Letter (Concluding part)"	22 July 1998
CID arrives at Mr Sethia's office following a clue that will lead them to investigate further on the case of the burnt letter.
27	"The Case of The Talkative Skeleton (Part - 1)"	29 July 1998
A group of women are cutting grass in an agricultural field when they discover a skeleton dug deep in the ground.
28	"The Case of The Talkative Skeleton (Concluding part)"	5 August 1998
At the forensic lab, Dr Salunkhe and Inspector Vivek are trying to decode the mystery behind the skeleton and to whom does it belong if not Venkat.
29	"The Case of the Unusual Alibi (Part - 1)"	12 August 1998
Inspector Daya walks into the CID bureau with a man named Kishore Swarna who was sent to prison 9 years ago by ACP Pradyuman.
30	"The Case of the Unusual Alibi (Concluding part)"	19 August 1998
A court session is in place and Swarna reveals that he is not responsible for the crime and in fact, he was at ACP Pradyuman's bungalow listening to his conversations.
31	"The Case of the Strange Hijack (Part - 1)"	26 August 1998
Famous artist Shrikant suffers a heart attack and is admitted to the hospital.
32	"The Case of the Strange Hijack (Concluding part)"	2 September 1998
CID is on the lookout for the valve and the stolen money.
33	"The Case of the Serial Killings (Part - 1)"	9 September 1998
A killer calls the CID bureau and informs them about his killings prior and leaves the clues in a book. Famous actresses are his victims.
34	"The Case of the Serial Killings (Concluding part)"	16 September 1998
The actresses are called at the CID bureau and they are told to do as per the guidelines but as panic ensues the actresses demand police protection.
35	"The Case of the Anonymous Informer (Part - 1)"	23 September 1998
CID receives an anonymous letter that claims he has been a witness to the murder of a young girl in a national park.
36	"The Case of the Anonymous Informer (Concluding part)"	30 September 1998
At the forensic lab, Dr Salunkhe reveals some hints about Amol's bike that was found at the National Park.
37	"The Case of the Closed Room (Part - 1)"	7 October 1998
Kamal Grover is found dead in his room after his family returns from a movie.
38	"The Case of the Closed Room (Concluding part)"	14 October 1998
CID finds out that Kamal did not die of an electric shock and instead they have been misled by one of the family members.
39	"The Case of the Stolen Gun (Part - 1)"	21 October 1998
While saving a child, ACP Pradyuman loses his gun and the hints lead the team of CID to Paresh Kumar's house but he has already fled the scene.
40	"The Case of the Stolen Gun (Concluding part)"	28 October 1998
CID is on the lookout for Paresh as they fear that he might kill Kundan Seth with the gun that he had stolen from the ACP.
41	"The Case of the Terrified Witness (Part - 1)"	4 November 1998
Somesh Kumar goes to meet Keshav but he is found dead in his apartment.
42	"The Case of the Terrified Witness (Concluding part)"	11 November 1998
Keshav's boss Vikas is the prime suspect of the case as Keshav knew a secret about Vikas.
43	"The Case of the Girl in Red (Part - 1)"	18 November 1998
Hotel Tourist Lodge becomes the recipient of a dead body of one of their customers named Satish Rathod in the parking area.
44	"The Case of the Girl in Red (Concluding part)"	25 November 1998
Forensic reports show a women's involvement in the murder of Satish Rathod.
45	"The Case of the 500 Rupee Note (Part - 1)"	2 December 1998
A man is killed in a joggers park and the watchman sees the culprit run away.
46	"The Case of the 500 Rupee Note (Concluding part)"	9 December 1998
CID investigate Mr Mehnak, the manager of the bank who reveals that money was stolen from a blue van while they were on their way by two people.
47	"The Case of the Deep Wound (Part - 1)"	16 December 1998
Shailesh comes home after work and finds his brother dead.
48	"The Case of the Deep Wound (Concluding part)"	23 December 1998
The killer comes to Sushilwadi and sells off some jewellery.
49	"The Case of the Last 5 Minutes (Part - 1)"	30 December 1998
While rehearsing during a shoot, film director Lalit dies and a reporter reveals that her camera was on at the time of his death.

== 1999 ==
Episode	Title	Original release date
50	"The Case of the Last 5 Minutes (Concluding part)"	6 January 1999
CID reaches Lalit's office to speak to his wife who reveals that Lalit was a very selfish man and he must have committed suicide.
51	"The Case of the Missing Bullet (Part - 1)"	13 January 1999
One night, on his way back home, Daya gets in a crossfire with a couple of goons, who manages to run away.
52	"The Case of the Missing Bullet (Concluding part)"	20 January 1999
The CID team is busy looking for the bullet that the goon had fired on Daya, as this could prove that was Daya was telling the truth.
53	"The Case of the Blind Witness (Part - 1)"	27 January 1999
An employer, Kavi and his employee Anand can be seen arguing where in the Kavi claims that he lost his eyesight because of Anand and that it was not an accident.
54	"The Case of the Blind Witness (Concluding part)"	3 February 1999
As CID nab Kamalkant for interrogation, he tells them he could not have murdered Anand as he was impressed with him and wanted Anand to come work for him.
55	"The Case of the Missing Fugitive (Part - 1)"	10 February 1999
ACP Pradyuman receives a call from Pune police informing him about the robbery that took place in their city is now on the run to Mumbai.
56	"The Case of the Missing Fugitive (Concluding part)"	17 February 1999
Inspector Viren returns home early that day as it is his son's birthday.
57	"The Case of the Killer Car (Part - 1)"	24 February 1999
The team of CID is called at night when a man called Dibkar is killed by a man called Raj with his car that he was driving without his headlights on.
58	"The Case of the Killer Car (Concluding part)"	3 March 1999
As the team continue working on their unusual clue given to them by the old couple, they come across a similar car but of different color.
59	"The Case of the Torn Magazine (Part - 1)"	17 March 1999
An old man approaches ACP Pradyuman with an important information that he found in a magazine in his library.
60	"The Case of the Torn Magazine (Concluding part)"	24 March 1999
With the help of Asha the team manages to find some suspects but with further examination, they all lead to dead end.
61	"The Case of the Blank Letter (Part - 1)"	31 March 1999
A diamond merchant named Vikas receives a blank letter addressed to a man called Ramesh.
62	"The Case of the Blank Letter (Concluding part)"	7 April 1999
As the case continues, the team is convinced that Vikas was murdered and the prime suspect is his servant.
63	"The Case of the Death by Drowning (Part - 1)"	14 April 1999
While on his morning jog, Inspector Deshmukh comes across a dead body and CID team is called for investigation.
64	"The Case of the Death by Drowning (Concluding part)"	21 April 1999
Inspector Deshmukh and the team of CID are inquiring about the two murders.
65	"The Case of the Death Threats (Part - 1)"	28 April 1999
Seema, an actress, gets very angry on the set of her movie as her role was passed to another actress called Riya. Later on the set, Riya gets a threatening note.
66	"The Case of the Death Threats (Concluding part)"	5 May 1999
One day on the set, while shooting one of the fake knives gets replaced by the real one but the killer misses his shot and accidentally hits the director of the movie instead of Riya.
67	"The Case of the Poisoned Chocolates (Part - 1)"	12 May 1999
Bharat Saxena, Chief Reporter at a news agency can be seen struggling to breathe as he is complaining about severe stomach pain.
68	"The Case of the Poisoned Chocolates (Concluding part)"	19 May 1999
Mr Khanna informs the CID team that he has been receiving threatening calls from a woman and from further investigation they are able to get a sketch of this woman.
69	"The Case of the Cross Connection (Part - 1)"	23 June 1999
A woman approaches ACP Pradyuman with a recording of two men discussing a murder.
70	"The Case of the Cross Connection (Concluding part)"	30 June 1999
With the help of a witness the team is able to get a sketch of the murderer.
71	"The Case of the Two Photographs (Part - 1)"	7 July 1999
A woman's, Sheetal, dead body found on the floor and a mysterious masked man can be seen fleeing the crime scene.
72	"The Case of the Two Photographs (Concluding part)"	14 July 1999
As the team continues their search for the masked man, they are still convinced that Sheetal's husband, Jagdish is the one who killed her and that detective.
73	"The Case of the Stolen Dynamite (Part - 1)"	21 July 1999
The CID team receives a call informing them that 30 kilos of dynamite was stolen from a work site nearby.
74	"The Case of the Stolen Dynamite (Concluding part)"	28 July 1999
As the investigation continues, the team is finally able to catch a man called Rishi and he admits to building the bomb.
75	"The Case of the Reluctant Killer (Part - 1)"	4 August 1999
Abhijeet and ACP Pradyuman find a suspicious looking man lurking outside their office.
76	"The Case of the Reluctant Killer (Concluding part)"	11 August 1999
An ex-convict named Babu Lal receives a call offering to pay him to murder a man.
77	"The Case of the Burnt Body (Part - 1)"	18 August 1999
A man's corpse is found burnt in a wrecked car.
78	"The Case of the Burnt Body (Concluding part)"	1 September 1999
CID find out that Vikas had met a man at his house before he was murdered and try to find out his identity and deduce that it must be someone at Vikas' office.
79	"The Case of the Stolen Necklace (Part - 1)"	8 September 1999
CID finds that a houseworker has been shot trying to prevent a necklace worth 50 lakh rupees from being stolen from a couple's home.
80	"The Case of the Stolen Necklace (Concluding part)"	15 September 1999
A new lead opens up in the case when it is revealed that the necklace was covered by the couple's insurance- and that the insurance company now owes them 50 lakh rupees.
81	"The Case of the Buried Hand (Part - 1)"	22 September 1999
A severed hand, wrapped up in a cloth, is dug up by a dog in a garden.
82	"The Case of the Buried Hand (Concluding part)"	29 September 1999
After extensive detective work, CID officers deduce that the hand likely belonged to a maid and then find out about a maid who went missing around the same time the hand was likely buried.
83	"The Case of the Missing Father (Part - 1)"	6 October 1999
CID encounters a child at the railway station, who has run away from home in search of his father.
84	"The Case of the Missing Father (Concluding part)"	13 October 1999
Chasing the lead of a photograph of the boy's father, taken some time ago, CID officers find out that it was taken as a part of a fraudulent program that promised to help people begin a new life in Japan, of which the father was a victim.
85	"The Case of the Drunken Killer (Part - 1)"	20 October 1999
A man's car breaks down with a flat tire while driving from Mumbai to Pune while intoxicated.
86	"The Case of the Drunken Killer (Concluding part)"	27 October 1999
After a bottle of alcohol is found in Alok's room, interviewing his family reveals that he is, in fact, addicted to alcohol and becomes an entirely different, more aggressive person while drunk.
87	"The Case of the Injured Witness (Part - 1)"	3 November 1999
Daya spots a high-profile criminal while out at a religious gathering, and calls CID to the scene to catch the criminal.
88	"The Case of the Injured Witness (Concluding part)"	10 November 1999
ACP Pradyuman, suspecting that something is wrong, sends Abhijeet to Daya's home and adds extra security to the criminal's room.
89	"The Case of the Dead Moneylender (Part - 1)"	17 November 1999
An old man's corpse is discovered in a park.
90	"The Case of the Dead Moneylender (Concluding part)"	24 November 1999
An investigation into the moneylender's clients reveals that he had one client, named Paresh Bhai.
91	"The Case of the Suicidal Student (Part - 1)"	1 December 1999
While the CID team is at Asha's house for dinner, Asha's neighbour interrupts the gathering, begging for help.
92	"The Case of the Suicidal Student (Concluding part)"	8 December 1999
ACP Pradyuman deduces that the boy would go to a quiet place if he wanted to ingest poison.
93	"The Case of the Man With Many Names (Part - 1)"	15 December 1999
When a businessman is murdered in his own home, CID is called in.
94	"The Case of the Man With Many Names (Concluding part)"	22 December 1999
The case seems to be a dead end, until an inspection of old case files reveals that a near-identical case was filed once before by a different man.
95	"The Case of the Red Cloth (Part - 1)"	29 December 1999
A corpse is found on a beach, of a man named Aman, a senile, drunkard man who was staying at a nearby hotel.

== 2000 ==
Episode	Title	Original release date
96	"The Case of the Red Cloth (Concluding part)"	5 January 2000
It is discovered that a man named Bipesh, who Raj owed money to, had been searching for the victim prior to his death.
97	"The Case of the Pickpocket's Clue (Part - 1)"	12 January 2000
A builder named Jayesh Kumar is murdered at a construction site of an apartment complex.
98	"The Case of the Pickpocket's Clue (Concluding part)"	19 January 2000
An investigation of Jayesh's home reveals a threatening letter that was recently sent to him as well as an audio cassette also leaving a death threat.
99	"The Case of the Vanishing Lady (Part - 1)"	26 January 2000
When a woman takes a taxi to go drop off a package at a building but never comes back out, the driver, concerned, calls CID to the scene.
100	"The Case of the Vanishing Lady (Concluding part)"	2 February 2000
Upon arriving at the woman's house, the taxi driver is shocked. This woman is not the woman he dropped off at the building.
101	"The Case of the Invisible Killer (Part - 1)"	9 February 2000
Promising scientist Ashok is found murdered inside his residence.
102	"The Case of the Invisible Killer (Concluding part)"	16 February 2000
CID was close enough to hear the gunshot that killed the professor. ACP and the team is convinced that nobody left the vicinity moments after the gunshot.
103	"The Case of the Deadly Frame Up (Part - 1)"	23 February 2000
Prominent businessman Rakesh and journalist Madan despise each other due to professional conflict.
104	"The Case of the Deadly Frame Up (Concluding part)"	1 March 2000
Forensic reports confirm it was Mahesh Verma who shot the bullet that killed Madan.
105	"The Case of the Accused Officer (Part - 1)"	8 March 2000
The editor of one of the biggest newspapers in town receives a package with a tape inside. The tape contains footage of Inspector Abhijeet taking a bribe from an unidentified individual.
106	"The Case of the Accused Officer (Concluding part)"	15 March 2000
The editor starts receiving threats for not releasing the story on time. Abhijeet on the other hand is trying his best to clear his name off this scandal.
107	"The Case of the Hijacked Car (Part - 1)"	22 March 2000
Ravi, a brother in distress gets in touch with ACP Pradyuman and his team for help in looking for his brother Jeevan, who hasn't returned home from the bank.
108	"The Case of the Hijacked Car (Concluding part)"	29 March 2000
With more information from eyewitnesses around that area, the team narrows down on a suspect.
109	"The Case of the Blind Witness (Part - 1)"	5 April 2000
ACP Pradyuman loses his eyesight.
110	"The Case of the Blind Witness (Concluding part)"	12 April 2000
With only his sense of touch and hearing as his weapons, ACP singles out a cellphone ringtone that stood out that night.
111	"The Case of the Dying Statement (Part - 1)"	19 April 2000
Sub Inspector Asha reconnects with an old college friend, Shardha. Things feel odd for Asha when she goes to visit Shardha at her place.
112	"The Case of the Dying Statement (Concluding part)"	26 April 2000
Shardha's last words clearly state that it was a suicide. With a dying declaration like that, it becomes hard for the prosecution to nail anyone, even with concrete evidence.
113	"The Case of the Impossible Murder (Part - 1)"	3 May 2000
A celebrated singer Jagdish is found dead inside the studio.
114	"The Case of the Impossible Murder (Concluding part)"	10 May 2000
Dr. Salunke and the forensic team is convinced that this is a clear case of suicide.
115	"The Case of the Missing Man (Part - 1)"	17 May 2000
An old couple reaches out to ACP Pradyuman for some help in finding their college-going son.
116	"The Case of the Missing Man (Concluding part)"	24 May 2000
With the help of Police informants, ACP Pradyuman and his team get some leads on where to look for the missing son.
117	"The Case of the Unknown Body (Part - 1)"	31 May 2000
CID is called into action as a body is found floating in the pond.
118	"The Case of the Unknown Body (Concluding part)"	7 June 2000
With the help of dental x-rays, ACP and his team make some progress and identify the deceased as Sanjay.
119	"The Case of the Clue in the Ashes (Part - 1)"	14 June 2000
With Dr. Salunke on leave and Dr. Asavri in charge, ACP Pradyuman and his team receive the news that businessman Pradhan had been stabbed to death.
120	"The Case of the Clue in the Ashes (Concluding part)"	21 June 2000
With the revelation of Kishore's betting habits and his debt; his motive behind murdering his father gets clearer.
121	"The Case of the Double Murder (Part - 1)"	28 June 2000
One of the two passengers asks the taxi driver to stop the cab. He steps out and disappears.
122	"The Case of the Double Murder (Concluding part)"	5 July 2000
With the case suddenly turning into a double murder mystery, ACP and his team are trying to get the most out of Pratap, Divya and Malik.
123	"The Case of the Helpless Killer (Part - 1)"	12 July 2000
A rehabilitated convict was attacked and thrown off a rooftop by an unknown individual.
124	"The Case of the Helpless Killer (Concluding part)"	19 July 2000
Papaji's co-operation helps the team unravel more mysteries.
125	"The Case of the Bolted Door (Part - 1)"	26 July 2000
Rakesh informs Inspector Daya that his wife isn't opening the door.
126	"The Case of the Bolted Door (Concluding part)"	2 August 2000
CID goes to a restaurant where Rakesh is a regular visitor and the waiter reveals that he comes here with a girl named Rosy.
127	"The Case of the Highway Robbery (Part - 1)"	9 August 2000
A newly married couple go missing from Mumbai Agra Highway.
128	"The Case of the Highway Robbery (Concluding part)"	16 August 2000
Two workers at a petrol pump named Manohar and Raju are prime suspects of the robberies but found missing since morning.
129	"The Case of the Dangerous Game (Part - 1)"	23 August 2000
A watchman at the guest house of Trimurti Corporation finds a dead body inside the guesthouse and informs CID.
130	"The Case of the Dangerous Game (Concluding part)"	30 August 2000
CID has caught Vikas and find the gun at his residence along with playing cards and money.
131	"The Case of the Innocent Victim (Part - 1)"	6 September 2000
A girl named Aparna dies in her house leaving her strands of hair as evidence.
132	"The Case of the Innocent Victim (Concluding part)"	13 September 2000
The prime suspect of Aparna's death is her friend Smita's husband Gagan who works at a lab that produces the poison thallium nitrate and has been found missing.
133	"The Case of the Theft and Murder (Part - 1)"	20 September 2000
CID is informed about a dual case of murder and robbery at a bungalow of a man named Girdhari.
134	"The Case of the Theft and Murder (Concluding part)"	27 September 2000
CID nabs Bittu from a chor bazaar and he reveals that he robbed the place but did not kill Girdhari.
135	"The Case of the Stolen Car (Part - 1)"	4 October 2000
ACP Pradyuman receives a call from his old friend Gokhale who is a lawyer and fighting a case against the terrorist. Gokhale complains of car theft.
136	"The Case of the Stolen Car (Concluding part)"	11 October 2000
The bomb squad is trying to defuse the bomb in Gokhale's car but before they could do that, the bomb explodes killing one of the bomb squad officers.
137	"The Case of the Thirteen Bullets (Part - 1)"	18 October 2000
Ramlal is on a call with his friend Lalit and just then he hears gunshots at Lalit's house.
138	"The Case of the Thirteen Bullets (Concluding part)"	25 October 2000
Inspector Daya is chasing a blue van which belongs to two goons, Churu and Nagesh and catches them with a bag of jewellery that they had stolen from Lalit's house.
139	"The Case of the Dead Body in Lift (Part - 1)"	1 November 2000
A man was calling to a woman.She kidnapped a child with blue bag and micky mouse water bottle.
140	"The Case of the Dead Body in Lift (Concluding part)"	8 November 2000
CID team inspected a car and found finger prints of a woman named Rita.
141	"The Case of the Silent Witness (Part - 1)"	15 November 2000
CID visit retired officer Suryakant where with the help of the alphabetical board he reveals that he saw a jogger being kidnapped.
142	"The Case of the Silent Witness (Concluding part)"	22 November 2000
CID look for a white car that was used by the killer to kidnap Vikrant.
143	"The Case of the Cry for Help (Part - 1)"	29 November 2000
Dr Salunkhe's nephew Smriti gets a call from a girl named Priya and asks her for help as she is a victim of domestic violence.
144	"The Case of the Cry for Help (Concluding part)"	6 December 2000
CID is on the lookout for Priya and her daughter.
145	"The Case of the Hidden Sniper (Part - 1)"	13 December 2000
A boy gets shot while travelling. Upon investigation, it is found out that the bullet was fired from a sniper rifle that was placed near a building.
146	"The Case of the Hidden Sniper (Concluding part)"	20 December 2000
A clue leads the CID team to investigate the locations that are used for drying fishes and a couple has been hiding there who is a prime suspect of the case.
147	"The Case of the Undercover Cop (Part - 1)"	27 December 2000
CID meets a prisoner named Dileep who was caught for trading drugs.

== 2001 ==
Episode	Title	Original release date
148	"The Case of the Undercover Cop (Concluding part)"	3 January 2001
Inspector is beaten up by the gang members but this leads the team of CID, closer to the suspect.
149	"The Case of the Armoured Bank Van (Part - 1)"	10 January 2001
The bank manager of India International Bank informs CID about the missing of their cash van.
150	"The Case of the Armoured Bank Van (Concluding part)"	17 January 2001
CID is on the lookout for the stolen van which has two crore rupees.
151	"The Case of the Missing Husband (Part - 1)"	24 January 2001
Inspector Asha's friend, Reahma has come from Pune to meet her at the CID office. She tells her that her husband, Rakesh was visiting Mumbai for some work but has not returned home.
152	"The Case of the Missing Husband (Concluding part)"	31 January 2001
As the search continues for Reshma's husband Rakesh, CID nabs the taxi driver whose taxi Rakesh had hired to go to the railway station.
153	"The Case of the Blackmail Victims (Part - 1)"	7 February 2001
Jagdish, a photographer, is in trouble and seeks his friend Anirbaan's help.
154	"The Case of the Blackmail Victims (Concluding part)"	14 February 2001
As Jagdish' case unfurls, more of his victims come forward.
155	"The Case of the Orphan Child (Part - 1)"	21 February 2001
A new born baby is abandoned outside an orphanage.
156	"The Case of the Orphan Child (Concluding part)"	28 February 2001
In the sequel episode, the father of the baby is identified and CID is in hot pursuit of him as he is about to kill the doctor who could not save his wife during the child birth.
157	"The Case of the Elusive Killer (Part - 1)"	7 March 2001
John's body is found by the CID who was on his way back from the gym.
158	"The Case of the Elusive Killer (Concluding part)"	14 March 2001
With the addition of Ajay in the picture, CID decides to keep a close eye on him.
159	"The Case of the Highway Looters (Part - 1)"	21 March 2001
A truck containing Methanol gets robbed on its way to the delivery station.
160	"The Case of the Highway Looters (Concluding part)"	28 March 2001
With Papaji's help, ACP and his team get more clarity on how this illegal chemical racket operates. They set up a fake office to nab the culprits.
161	"The Case of Two Abhijit's (Part - 1)"	25 April 2001
Abhijeet gets a phone call from a man called Bhau. Bhau abuses and threatens Abhijeet for no odd reason which confuses the entire team.
162	"The Case of Two Abhijits (Concluding part)"	4 May 2001
With the revelation that a 'nakli Abhijeet' has been extorting people and then finding out about his death, ACP Pradyuman and his team hit a wall.
163	"The Case of the Missing Body (Part - 1)"	11 May 2001
A burglar reveals that he saw a dead body inside one of the houses he broke into. CID quickly rush in and find nothing inside the house.
164	"The Case of the Missing Body (Concluding part)"	18 May 2001
With the revelation that there indeed was a box that was thrown into the lake, the officers quickly call for a search team and start looking for the box.
165	"The Case of Fifty Thousand Enemies (Part - 1)"	25 May 2001
Deepak, with his wife at gun point, is forced to kill a guest, named Suhas, staying in his hotel.
166	"The Case of Fifty Thousand Enemies (Concluding part)"	1 June 2001
Inspector Daya and Inspector Abhijeet nab a goon from a barber's shop who sold a pistol to the killer and reveals the name of his boss Nanne.
167	"The Case of the Terrified Actress (Part - 1)"	8 June 2001
Actress Kinnari gets death threats but Asha reveals that it is just a publicity stunt.
168	"The Case of the Terrified Actress (Concluding part)"	15 June 2001
Dr Salunkhe investigates the body and finds the bullet in the room. Meanwhile, Daya finds an empty shell in the opposite building.
169	"The Case of the Two Wounds (Part - 1)"	22 June 2001
Rakesh finds his wife Suhasini dead in their apartment.
170	"The Case of the Two Wounds (Concluding part)"	29 June 2001
Building security guard Baldev reveals the shocking identity of a man who drugged him and went into the building.
171	"The Case of 6:48 (Part - 1)"	6 July 2001
A man knocked at the door.A woman opened the door.The man entered home and attacked her child.
172	"The Case of 6:48 (Concluding part)"	13 July 2001
CID team inspected a bomb blast site.Cops found that the bomb was in briefcase.
173	"The Case of the Doctor's Wife (Part - 1)"	20 July 2001
A doctor dies in his clinic and all eyes are on a lady who has the gun in her hand.
174	"The Case of the Doctor's Wife (Concluding part)"	27 July 2001
Dr Salunkhe has a new revelation about Dr Brijendra's death and demonstrates it at the lab.
175	"The Case of the Healthy Patients (Part - 1)"	3 August 2001
A man named Govind dies and both his kidneys have been removed from his body.
176	"The Case of the Healthy Patients (Concluding part)"	10 August 2001
CID find out the identity of the victim, and begin investigating his life in search of clues. But in the meantime, Daya's life is in danger.
177	"The Case of the Missing Maid (Part - 1)"	17 August 2001
When a housing society maid goes missing, CID is called to the scene.
178	"The Case of the Missing Maid (Concluding part)"	24 August 2001
When the owner of the house insists that he did not murder Kanta, he and CID begin searching the apartment in search of signs of burglary.
179	"The Case of the Impossible Murder (Part - 1)"	31 August 2001
When a criminal caught by Abhijeet is executed by the government, his wife vows to get her revenge.
180	"The Case of the Impossible Murder (Concluding part)"	7 September 2001
All the evidence seems to point to Abhijeet being the killer.
181	"The Case of the Counterfeit Cop (Part - 1)"	14 September 2001
A man's son is kidnapped. His kidnappers demand 50 lakh rupees to have him returned, also threatening that if the police get involved, they will kill him.
182	"The Case of the Counterfeit Cop (Concluding part)"	21 September 2001
ACP Santos has the bright idea to mark the notes with a blue pigment, so that the kidnapper's hands turn blue and he becomes easy to spot.
183	"The Case of the Missing Body (Part - 1)"	28 September 2001
When an outdoor enthusiast goes missing while on a trek, his wife rushes to the CID team for help.
184	"The Case of the Missing Body (Concluding part)"	5 October 2001
After finding Deependra's corpse, CID begin the search for his murderer.
185	"The Case of Sacrificing Father (Part - 1)"	12 October 2001
A unique case reaches CID's doorstep when a man turns himself in for murdering his wife.
186	"The Case of the Counterfeit Murderer (Concluding part)"	19 October 2001
With the man's confession, forensic evidence from the scene, and a clear motive, the case seems simple and shut.
187	"The Case of the Blackmailing Witness (Part - 1)"	26 October 2001
A hit and run case puts a young girl in the hospital, fighting for her life.
188	"The Case of the Blackmailing Witness (Concluding part)"	2 November 2001
An investigation of the girl's injuries reveals that only an Ambassador brand car could have injured her in such a way.
189	"The Case of the Missing Cap (Part - 1)"	9 November 2001
A play comes to grinding halt when a dead body is found amongst an audience at the theatre.
190	"The Case of the Missing Cap (Concluding part)"	16 November 2001
When an eyewitness account reveals that the killer wore a cap, CID begin searching audience members in search of one.
191	"The Case of the Broken Shoelace (Part - 1)"	23 November 2001
A doctor faces the ultimate challenge when he must save the life of the man who taught him when he was young.
192	"The Case of the Broken Shoelace (Concluding part)"	30 November 2001
A nurse confesses that she saw a man enter the operating room- but that she could not see his face because he was wearing a surgical mask.
193	"The Case of the Amnesia Patient (Part - 1)"	7 December 2001
CID officers come across a car accident while out driving.
194	"The Case of the Amnesia Patient (Concluding part)"	14 December 2001
A mysterious man comes to the CID headquarters claiming the woman is his niece, and that her mental state is unstable, taking her home with him.
195	"The Case of the Mystery Man (Part - 1)"	21 December 2001
A man's unconscious body is found dumped underneath a flyover, with ?1 lakh on him. He has been badly injured.
196	"The Case of the Mystery Man (Concluding part)"	28 December 2001
Despite his injuries, the man wakes up- but upon awakening, he insists he injured himself by falling off the flyover by mistake, despite evidence from his injuries that he was attacked.

== 2002 ==
Episode	Title	Original release date
197	"The Case of the Blackmail Victims (Part - 1)"	4 January 2002
A government officer's luggage is stolen during a journey.
198	"The Case of the Blackmail Victims (Concluding part)"	11 January 2002
CID is consulted to help recover the officer's diary and save the lives of the witnesses.
199	"The Case of the Giant Wheel (Part - 1)"	18 January 2002
A woman's dead body is found on an amusement park ride.
200	"The Case of the Giant Wheel (Concluding part)"	25 January 2002
The clues begin to increase. An inspection of the amusement park reveals a bag with a yellow shirt and blue jeans near the giant wheel ride where the body was found.
201	"The Case of the Multiple Puzzles (Part - 1)"	1 February 2002
ACP and his team stumble upon a case where a man gets thrown off a building, all because of a photograph.
202	"The Case of the Multiple Puzzles (Concluding part)"	8 February 2002
Knowing that they might be dealing with an issue that involves national security, the team needs to be careful.
203	"The Case of Ravinder Katre's Murder (Part - 1)"	15 February 2002
Two friends who were out on a casual fishing trip suddenly get the biggest shock of their lives when their hook gets stuck to a corpse underwater.
204	"The Case of Ravinder Katre's Murder (Concluding part)"	22 February 2002
ACP and his team come to know about Rosy, who frequented one of these gambling dens and was known to the deceased.
205	"The Case of the Father's Revenge (Part - 1)"	1 March 2002
ACP Pradyuman's attempt to trick kidnappers backfires when the kidnapper gets critically wounded in the altercation.
206	"The Case of the Father's Revenge (Concluding part)"	8 March 2002
With revenge being one of the motives, it becomes significantly harder for the team to trace the child.
207	"The Case of the Blackout (Part - 1)"	15 March 2002
A woman goes missing from her in-law's boutique. The store manager claims that she left in a white police jeep.
208	"The Case of the Blackout (Concluding part)"	22 March 2002
The alcoholic husband remains clueless about his wife's disappearance. Hardly getting out of his intoxicated universe, he lives in complete denial.
209	"The Case of the Last Show (Part - 1)"	29 March 2002
A man is shot inside a movie theatre, bringing everything to a halt.
210	"The Case of the Last Show (Concluding part)"	5 April 2002
A 'blind witness'- is good as an oxymoron as one can get. The witness at CID's disposal, the blind owner of the PCO, is the only witness who can identify the culprit.
211	"The Case of the Four Rinas (Part - 1)"	12 April 2002
A criminal terrorizes the city when he commits a spree of attacks on anyone named Rina Raj.
212	"The Case of the Four Rinas (Concluding part)"	19 April 2002
The close call at the terrace reveals two things. The killer mentioned come one called Shashikant and the fact that he was in search of some diamond.
213	"The Case of 48kms to Mumbai (Part - 1)"	26 April 2002
An Intelligence officer is found dead in the jungle.
214	"The Case of 48kms to Mumbai (Concluding part)"	3 May 2002
Investigations around the forest helps the team find out more about the culprits and their possible exit route.
215	"The Case of the Strange Clues (Part - 1)"	10 May 2002
A man's wedding proposal gets interrupted when the girlfriend spots an abandoned corpse inside a car, on the opposite side of the road.
216	"The Case of the Strange Clues (Concluding part)"	17 May 2002
With information about the relationship with Sheila, ACP Pradyuman and his team dig deeper into the records and find out more about the will that was left behind.
217	"The Case of Locker No. 42 (Part - 1)"	24 May 2002
A blood-stained letter is sent to the Bureau. Closer inspection reveals that the key opened one of the lockers in a local bank belonging to someone named Kamal.
218	"The Case of Locker No. 42 (Concluding part)"	31 May 2002
With Kamal dead in his house, the team struggles to put pieces together.
219	"The Case of the Clinching Evidence (Part - 1)"	7 June 2002
Dr. Salunke gets into a traffic altercation. Things get heated up and Dr. Salunke draws his licensed firearm at the man. A few days later the man is found dead and the fingerprints on the scene match Dr. Salunke's prints.
220	"The Case of the Clinching Evidence (Concluding part)"	14 June 2002
With fingerprints on one side and just a broken piece of glass on the other, the case is heavily tilted towards prosecution. The team senses that Dr. Salunke is being framed in a larger conspiracy.
221	"The Case of 639 Coins (Part - 1)"	21 June 2002
A man mysteriously dies of a heart attack in a shopping market. His team abduct a popular star and demand the CID team to release their dead boss with a ransom.
222	"The Case of 639 Coins (Concluding part)"	28 June 2002
With clear indication that the calls were made from Public Call Offices. The team does a thorough fingerprint scan of all the coins in those three portable public phones, hoping for a match.
223	"The Case of the Dishonest Cop (Part - 1)"	5 July 2002
Inspector Daya's friend, a television director, invites him over to discuss a murder mystery script that he was working on.
224	"The Case of the Dishonest Cop (Concluding part)"	12 July 2002
With some people in the industry pointing fingers at Daya, there is a huge lack of internal trust in the department.
225	"The Case of the Unknown Girl (Part - 1)"	19 July 2002
Inspector Abhijeet goes through a temporary phase of 'memory loss' due to his combat injuries.
226	"The Case of the Unknown Girl (Concluding part)"	26 July 2002
Inspector Abhijeet is on the lookout of an unknown girl who is believed to be dead five years ago.
227	"The Case of the Mysterious Matrimonials (Part - 1)"	2 August 2002
A woman hits a man with her car but upon investigation, it is found that the man was killed by a gunshot.
228	"The Case of the Mysterious Matrimonials (Concluding part)"	9 August 2002
The dead man, a journalist, was tracking Mysterious Matrimonials. Looking into it, CID team uncover and bust a drug distribution syndicate.
229	"The Case of the Invisible Bullet (Part - 1)"	16 August 2002
Dr Salunkhe is a suspect in a murder case and CID find this about him.
230	"The Case of the Invisible Bullet (Concluding part)"	23 August 2002
Salunkhe is accused of hiding the bullet that is used for the murder.
231	"The Case of the Dead Murderer (Part - 1)"	30 August 2002
A man named Jayant is killed after he gets a death threat from a kid named Avinash who is known to be dead from the past 20 years.
232	"The Case of the Dead Murderer (Concluding part)"	6 September 2002
CID interrogate Shruti who is in the hospital after being attacked. Inspector Abhijeet has also been attacked.
233	"The Case of the Unknown Attacker (Part - 1)"	13 September 2002
A man received death threats through letters and texts. CID investigated the case and interrogates the inmates of the house as they are the major suspects.
234	"The Case of the Unknown Attacker (Concluding part)"	20 September 2002
Niranjan gets a heart attack and CID reaches to investigate. The culprit is still on the run and it is found that his medicines were quoted with an allergen.
235	"The Case of the Flashing Light (Part - 1)"	27 September 2002
Residents of a society in Borivali are suspicious of an unknown person in their area. Upon investigation it is found out that a guy named Raj has been killed and Neha has disappeared.
236	"The Case of the Flashing Light (Concluding part)"	4 October 2002
CID finds an unknown skull buried in the ground. They suspect that it is linked to Raj's death and interrogate a transporter who knew Raj.
237	"The Case of the Bomb Scare (Part - 1)"	11 October 2002
A bomb explodes outside actress Ranjana's house and CID is on the case to investigate who did this.
238	"The Case of the Bomb Scare (Concluding part)"	18 October 2002
CID finds producer Vipin Kumar and his wife along with actress Ranjana, and hunt for the mysterious bomber, with victims being bag snatchers.
239	"The Case of the Panther Menace (Part - 1)"	25 October 2002
A young kid witnesses the murder of a girl by a panther.
240	"The Case of the Panther Menace (Concluding part)"	1 November 2002
A kid spots a man-eating wild animal in the forest. A woman is attacked by the animal and she dies.
241	"The Case of the Green Paint Murders (Part - 1)"	8 November 2002
A nurse is found dead in her house with green paint smeared all over her face and also on the serving dishes.
242	"The Case of the Green Paint Murders (Concluding part)"	15 November 2002
Nurses are being killed with green paint on their faces. Dr Yash is considered a suspect for these killings.
243	"The Case of the Frame Up (Part - 1)"	22 November 2002
Sudhakar is framed while returning to Mumbai on a trip, after a body is found in the trunk of his car.
244	"The Case of the Frame Up (Concluding part)"	29 November 2002
Sudhakar meets his informant and asks for a place to hide where CID cannot find him. Investigation leads CID team to find a bunch of bank robbers and their mastermind.
245	"The Case of the Mysterious Deaths (Part - 1)"	6 December 2002
A man named Utkarsh who has been missing from his home since the last three years enters a gift shop and threatens the shopkeeper for one lakh rupees.
246	"The Case of the Mysterious Deaths (Concluding part)"	13 December 2002
Utkarsh's parents reveal about their son's drinking problem and just then CID find a dead body of another man named Abhimanyu.
247	"The Case of the Juicy Poison (Part - 1)"	20 December 2002
A girl named Malini dies after being given poison through juice. Her husband is the prime suspect.
248	"The Case of the Juicy Poison (Concluding part)"	27 December 2002
A syringe is found in the juice factory and CID is called in to investigate. The syringe was used to inject poison in the juice bottles.

== 2003 ==
Episode	Title	Original release date
249	"The Case of Predictions (Part - 1)"	3 January 2003
Dr Purshottam dies and his death was predicted by a patient who has Alzheimer's.
250	"The Case of Predictions (Concluding part)"	10 January 2003
Another accident takes place at Kings Circle and it was also predicted by the Alzheimer's patient.
251	"The Case of the Wedding Blues (Part - 1)"	17 January 2003
On the eve of Karthik's marriage his ex-girlfriend is bitter and threatens her.
252	"The Case of the Wedding Blues (Concluding part)"	24 January 2003
The suicide note of Karthik does not match with his handwriting and what is even more surprising the same gun has been used to kill both Salakha and Karthik.
253	"The Case of the Tempting Diamond (Part - 1)"	7 February 2003
Ranveer an aging patriarch calls his entire family to explain that he is now broke. All he is left with is a Rs.2.5 crore diamond which he intends to sell.
254	"The Case of the Tempting Diamond (Concluding part)"	14 February 2003
CID starts investigating the murder case and finds that all members of the family including the maid and her daughter are driven by greed and had a reason to kill the patriarch.
255	"The Case of the Red Water (Part - 1)"	28 February 2003
In a housing society every house is under panic as the water coming in their taps is red in colour and the suspect it to be blood.
256	"The Case of the Red Water (Concluding part)"	7 March 2003
The kitchen water line now starts turning red a quick check on the second water tank reveals that the killer has struck again and once again dumped the body in the tank.
257	"The Case of the Frightened Men (Part - 1)"	14 March 2003
Piyush, a writer specializing in murder mysteries, becomes the prime suspect when one of the five friends, Rishab, gets murdered in his presence shot with his own gun in his own house.
258	"The Case of the Frightened Men (Concluding part)"	21 March 2003
The twist in the story comes when it comes to light that Chander, one of Rishab's friend had a motive to kill.
259	"The Case of 10.30am (Part - 1)"	28 March 2003
A man in a mask enters a bank to rob it. The robbery goes haywire when he gets a heart attack.
260	"The Case of 10.30am (Concluding part)"	4 April 2003
CID gets a call from a girl from the club that she has seen Raghu talking to a woman who worked there, but had quit only a day before.
261	"The Case of the Nightmare (Part - 1)"	11 April 2003
Sidharth is prone to seeing nightmares. He witnesses a murder in a bungalow with the body being disposed in a wardrobe.
262	"The Case of the Nightmare (Concluding part)"	18 April 2003
The initial suspicion is on Sidharth as he has with him the key of the wardrobe where the corpse was hidden.
263	"The Case of the Chasing Butterflies (Part - 1)"	25 April 2003
At a motel in the outskirts of the city a car is parked in such a way that it obstructs others driving out.
264	"The Case of the Chasing Butterflies (Concluding part)"	2 May 2003
CID investigates the lead given by the forensics and try to find out the specialty of the butterfly eggs.
265	"The Case of the Invisible Murderer (Part - 1)"	9 May 2003
During a party, a man named Shailendra plans to make a new will that deprives his family members of taking his money after his death. Before he can sign it, he is killed.
266	"The Case of the Invisible Murderer (Concluding part)"	16 May 2003
With the help of Dr. Salunke team of CID were able to track down the weapon use in killing Shailendra.
267	"The Case of the Mysterious Blast (Part - 1)"	23 May 2003
A taxi gets blown up in a blast with the bomb planted in a suitcase left on the back seat.
268	"The Case of the Mysterious Blast (Concluding part)"	30 May 2003
The sticker on the teddy bear leads CID to a hotel and suspect who had checked out the day after the blast.
269	"The Case of the Elusive Bomber (Part - 1)"	6 June 2003
A mock blast scene goes terribly wrong as somebody has used actual explosives to sabotage the entire project. The blast master is killed in the explosion.
270	"The Case of the Elusive Bomber (Concluding part)"	13 June 2003
The intricate web of deceit and betrayal takes the CID back to twenty five years when seventy five lakh rupees were looted.
271	"The Case of the Red Rain (Part - 1)"	20 June 2003
An elderly gentleman is seen driving the car erratically and dashes against the sidewalk. He gets out of the car and after taking a few unsteady steps fall down dead.
272	"The Case of the Red Rain (Concluding part)"	27 June 2003
Forensics conclude that the killer has a burnt hand because of which he has a peculiar finger print which were retrieved from the letters and the umbrella used to inject the poison.
273	"The Case of the Poisonous Cigarettes (Part - 1)"	4 July 2003
In a crowded restaurant two friends who had come from Delhi suffer from heart attacks. One of them dies.
274	"The Case of the Poisonous Cigarettes (Concluding part)"	11 July 2003
CID team starts working closely on their movements and find out that they were in a discotheque prior to coming over to the restaurant.
275	"The Case of Two Blackmailers (Part - 1)"	18 July 2003
A man is stabbed and his body thrown from a van before an ATM on a rainy night. He desperately wanted to say something to a lady coming out of the ATM but dies on the road itself.
276	"The Case of Two Blackmailers (Concluding part)"	25 July 2003
A photographer's corpse is found by CID.
277	"The Case of Nailing the Suspect (Part - 1)"	1 August 2003
A woman is found dead at her office desk.
278	"The Case of Nailing the Suspect (Concluding part)"	8 August 2003
After an inspection of the office employees' hands fails to reveal any findings, Abhijeet deduces that the killer must have cut their nails.
279	"The Case of Flat 211 (Part - 1)"	15 August 2003
A man's body is found in a flat where he does not live.
280	"The Case of Flat 211 (Concluding part)"	22 August 2003
Further forensic investigation reveals that marks from the fingers of five different people are on the door- which means the man was not alone, and likely murdered.
281	"The Case of the Spitting Cobra (Part - 1)"	29 August 2003
A man's corpse is found floating in a river by a family out on an excursion. The victim's eyes are swollen due to, it turns out, snake venom.
282	"The Case of the Spitting Cobra (Concluding part)"	5 September 2003
An investigation reveals that all three men landed up in the jungle after having a meal together, and that the one who survived seems to have some kind of amnesia.
283	"The Case of the Horrifying Virus (Part - 1)"	12 September 2003
A prisoner escapes from jail and robs and kills a man.
284	"The Case of the Horrifying Virus (Concluding part)"	19 September 2003
CID question the prisoner's kin and find out that he plans to visit someone in the city.
285	"The Case of the Missing Money (Part - 1)"	26 September 2003
A man's corpse is found, killed by drowning after being knocked out by a hit to the head.
286	"The Case of the Missing Money (Concluding part)"	3 October 2003
It is revealed that the victim was a state agent who intended to buy a property near Ranipur- and was carrying 40 lakh rupees with him before he died, all of which is now missing.
287	"The Case of Robbery After Death (Part - 1)"	10 October 2003
A scientist's body is found at a private science lab, where a six-month vaccine for anthrax has just been developed- and now, stolen.
288	"The Case of Robbery After Death (Concluding part)"	17 October 2003
CID officers deduce that a rival pharmaceutical company must have ordered this killing in order to be able to steal the vaccine but have no evidence to support this theory.
289	"Howzzat? (Part - 1)"	24 October 2003
At an airport security check, a gun is found in the bag of Indian cricketing star Kapil Dev.
290	"Howzzat? (Concluding part)"	31 October 2003
A forensic investigation of the body reveals that the victim was shot by the same gun found in Kapil Dev's bag. However the team finds that the gun was planted in his bag and the real suspect is caught. CID team releases Kapil Dev with an autograph.
291	"The Case of the Unusual Murder (Part - 1)"	5 December 2003
CID is called to a seemingly ordinary crime scene.
292	"The Case of the Unusual Murder (Concluding part)"	12 December 2003
All the clues seem to be pointing to a suspect name Daria- the eyewitness recognises him and his shoes match the footprint at the scene.
293	"The Case of the Serial Threats (Part - 1)"	19 December 2003
A man's family keeps receiving death threats, and when his front door is fired at as he is returning home, he requests the help of CID officers.
294	"The Case of the Serial Threats (Concluding part)"	26 December 2003
An investigation near the man's home reveals a partially destroyed letter from a man named Rajesh to a woman named Sheila.

== 2004 ==
Episode	Title	Original release date
295	"Better Safe Than Sorry (Part - 1)"	2 January 2004
A man on an amusement park ride makes a phone call crying out for help. Moments later, he is thrown off the ride and killed.
296	"Better Safe Than Sorry (Concluding part)"	9 January 2004
It is found out that the banker had opened two safe deposit boxes that belonged to him and his wife before he was killed.
297	"The Case of the Kidnapped Girl (Part - 1)"	16 January 2004
Two men kidnap a girl in broad daylight at a shopping centre, despite her crying out for her friend's help.
298	"The Case of the Kidnapped Girl (Concluding part)"	23 January 2004
The kidnappers' van is found abandoned near the shopping centre.
299	"Target: CID (Part - 1)"	30 January 2004
A gun is sent to a child's birthday party that Daya is attending, and he gets shot. Soon after, Asha almost dies when her elevator plummets into the shaft after the chain breaks. Abhijeet is also involved in an accident when the brakes of his squad car stop working, causing a car crash.
300	"Target: CID (Concluding part)"	6 February 2004
A mysterious gas is released from a package into CID headquarters, temporarily blinding all the officers. The team finds clues about school kids getting poisoned, done by a criminal duo as revenge for ACP arresting them.
301	"The Case of the Dazed Man (Part - 1)"	13 February 2004
A kid playing by himself in the shopping center finds a man drenched in blood.
302	"The Case of the Dazed Man (Concluding part)"	20 February 2004
After finding the teacher's dead body, the CID are put in a catch-22 situation.
303	"The Case of the Invisible Bomb (Part - 1)"	27 February 2004
A bomb blasts in a patient room of a hospital.
304	"The Case of the Invisible Bomb (Concluding part)"	5 March 2004
Unfolding the mystery and finding another layer of poisoning in the case. It is found the poison was in the Samosa and the chai.
305	"The Case of the Suicide That Was Murder (Part - 1)"	12 March 2004
A man falls off the building and dies. The closest person there happened to be Inspector Daya's friend, who becomes the prime accused in this case. Forensic team is convinced that Daya and Abhijeet are trying to protect the culprit.
306	"The Case of the Suicide That Was Murder (Concluding part)"	19 March 2004
With the team still trying to figure out the exact chain of events that led to the death, the forensic team gets its hands on some crucial evidence that changes the whole direction of the investigation.
307	"The Case of the Deadly Proposal (Part - 1)"	26 March 2004
ACP Pradyuman keeps getting phone calls from an unknown admirer. She insists that she loves him and they should get married.
308	"The Case of the Deadly Proposal (Concluding part)"	2 April 2004
The case takes a sudden turn when ACP realizes that the woman was just a pawn in the bigger picture. She was being used by someone influential in the background.
309	"Trust Me, Trust Me Not (Part - 1)"	9 April 2004
A thief caught in a raid reveals that he saw a dead body in one of the houses he looted. At other end, CID team investigate the murder of a restaurant waiter.
310	"Trust Me, Trust Me Not (Concluding part)"	16 April 2004
After shedding light on the blackmailing nexus, ACP Pradyuman and his team get into some dangerous territories, when Senior Inspector Abhijeet goes under cover and risks it all. ACP Pradyuman introduces Daksh as a new member.
311	"The Case of the Kidnapped Girl (Part - 1)"	23 April 2004
A famous film star Kamlini gets abducted from a five star hotel.
312	"The Case of the Kidnapped Girl (Concluding part)"	30 April 2004
The manager reveals that Kamilini was part of the plan, but the second kidnapping wasn't part of their plan.
313	"The Case of the Mistaken Identity (Part - 1)"	7 May 2004
CID get baffled when they find two women who looked exactly like the deceased in their latest case.
314	"The Case of the Mistaken Identity (Concluding part)"	14 May 2004
A third woman arrives with the same face, and the team link the murders to an old murder case.
315	"ACP in the Game of Death (Part - 1)"	21 May 2004
After coming to know about the flash mob, ACP goes looking for the girl he gave a lift to. As it turns out, the girl died under unusual circumstances.
316	"ACP in the Game of Death (Concluding part)"	28 May 2004
As the forensic team reveals that the death was dude to being bitten by a venomous snake, officers are put in a fix as they didn't have suspect.
317	"The 15 Year Old Case (Part - 1)"	4 June 2004
A case involving a murder because of mistaken identity, the immediate death of the murderer that followed, and the resurgence of the same murderer after years of inactivity.
318	"The 15 Year Old Case (Concluding part)"	11 June 2004
An already convoluted case becomes even more layered when the team realizes how big a role facial reconstruction surgery has played in this case.
319	"The Case of the Comatose Victim (Part - 1)"	18 June 2004
A patient in critical condition is being treated in a hospital in Mumbai. But for some odd reason, her life has been at constant risk.
320	"The Case of the Comatose Victim (Concluding part)"	25 June 2004
The Mystery continues as new information pops about an address, probably a fake one but with some level of truth to it.
321	"The Bloody Trail (Part - 1)"	2 July 2004
A long trail of blood leads to a murder.
322	"The Bloody Trail (Concluding part)"	9 July 2004
With a key but no locker CID had to do a thorough search of the city to locate the gym where the key could be used.
323	"Return of Daksh (Part - 1)"	16 July 2004
Officer Daksh's almost lifeless body is found in the jungle by Senior Inspector Abhijeet and Daya.
324	"Return of Daksh (Concluding part)"	23 July 2004
Ever since their informer's death, the team has been tracking a package from Mongolia which was supposed to arrive along with a guy called Cheena. The team find the mastermind of the syndicate, who was also responsible for killing Daksh's brother years ago.
325	"Faceless Killer (Part - 1)"	30 July 2004
A man dies in a hotel in mysterious ways. There seems to be video footage of the murderer, but with the head cropped out.
326	"Faceless Killer (Concluding part)"	6 August 2004
Trying to clear its name off the controversy, the team traces Chandrakants wife and questions her.
327	"The Case of the Dead Murderer (Part - 1)"	13 August 2004
Dead bodies are found in a hotel and no one has any clue about it.
Special–Episode	"CID-Azaadi Special"	14 August 2004
Importance of India's Independence Day,15th August, was highlighted.
328	"The Case of the Dead Murderer (Concluding part)"	20 August 2004
Forensic reports reveal poison to be the death of the manager and Vijay.
329	"Abhijeet in Danger (Part - 1)"	27 August 2004
Inspector Abhijeet has been framed for the death of Riya. Abhijeet does not remember anything at all but his gun is found at the site of the crime.
330	"Abhijeet in Danger (Concluding part)"	3 September 2004
Upon investigation, it is revealed that Riya's blood was stolen from the blood bank and spilt outside Ashok's house. Abhijeet is still struggling to find out his involvement in the case.
331	"The Haunted Building (Part - 1)"	17 September 2004
A killer uses a hologram to kill two people in a building.
332	"The Haunted Building (Concluding part)"	24 September 2004
Dr Salunkhe comes back to CID and ACP Pradyuman is not happy seeing him back. A CID officer is involved in the killings and CID is trying to investigate the matter.
333	"The Unknown Conspiracy (Part - 1)"	1 October 2004
Abhijeet is suspended from CID due to his involvement in the killing. CID investigates the case of a girl who was kidnapped in a godown.
334	"The Unknown Conspiracy (Concluding part)"	8 October 2004
CID interrogates Sushmaya who is at the funeral of her father in law. She is a prime suspect of the death of Kiran and in the meanwhile, forensics reveal that Kiran did not die due to accident.
335	"The Case of Man on the Bus (Part - 1)"	15 October 2004
A man falls from a running bus and dies. Forensics reveal that his hand was burnt by a cigarette and then he was pushed out of the bus. Meanwhile, a girl is also found dead.
336	"The Case of Man on the Bus (Concluding part)"	22 October 2004
CID tries to tie loose ends of the death of the girl and the guy. They interrogate the manager of the restaurant where they had lunch.
337	"The Case of the Deadly Betrayal (Part - 1)"	29 October 2004
Inspector Daya has been shot after he was investigating at a discotheque. The killer is unknown and looks like a betrayal.
338	"The Case of the Deadly Betrayal (Concluding part)"	5 November 2004
Dr.Anjalika at the forensics finds the fingerprint marks on the bricks that takes the team of CID closer to the killer who has also kidnapped Inspector Daya.
Special–Episode	"The Inheritance / CID 111"	7 November 2004
A hotelier comes down from South Africa to wind up his business and sort out his inheritance. All his relatives gather at the hotel in the hope of getting a share of his property. A murder takes place amidst them and the owner summons the CID. Just when the CID team thinks it has tracked the killer, two more murders are committed. The special episode was shot on 8 October 2004 at Lonavala. In an attempt to create a new world record, CID team shot continuously (without a cut) for 111 minutes, which made them enter the Guinness Book of World Records and the Limca Book of Records.
339	"The Case of the Secret in the Ashes (Part - 1)"	12 November 2004
Sentosa Bar gets burned down and CID finds a skeleton at the site. A girl named Reshma goes missing after the fire.
340	"The Case of the Secret in the Ashes (Concluding part)"	19 November 2004
Inspector Aditi is linked to Reshma and the team of CID finds out. Aditi does not let CID investigate Reshma who had run from her house a few years ago.
341	"The Case of the Ticket Window (Part - 1)"	26 November 2004
CID is investigating the case of a ticket window where two people die after taking a ticket from the counter.
342	"The Case of the Ticket Window (Concluding part)"	3 December 2004
Inspector Sudhakar is taken to the hospital due to his critical condition after he smelled a capsule containing poisonous gas.
343	"The Case of the Murder in the Interrogation Room (Part - 1)"	10 December 2004
CID is framed for the murder of two businessmen. Forensics reveals CID's involvement in the murder and strict action is taken on CID.
344	"The Case of the Murder in the Interrogation Room (Concluding part)"	17 December 2004
Inspector Daksh is trying to steal evidence from the forensic lab and Dr Anjalika catches him.
345	"Murders at Sunrise (Part - 1)"	24 December 2004
A TV actor is killed while swimming at the sunrise hotel. Meanwhile, another actor Bobby has been killed.
346	"Murders at Sunrise (Concluding part)"	31 December 2004
The security guard has been tied up and CID finds a shoe mark at the site that will lead them to the killer.

== 2005 ==
Episode	Title	Original release date
347	"Double Trouble (Part - 1)"	7 January 2005
Tanuj is a multi-millionaire and is found dead.
348	"Double Trouble (Concluding part)"	14 January 2005
CID is not convinced with the identity of Tanuj and Rupali is also killed.
349	"The Final Showdown (Part - 1)"	21 January 2005
ACP Pradyuman's car is found stranded at a spot. Upon investigation, there is blood found inside it and a girl is dead. ACP is the suspect of the murder.
350	"The Final Showdown (Concluding part)"	28 January 2005
ACP's son kidnaps him but ACP manages to escape and brings him to the bureau. His son pleads not guilty but ACP does not listen.
351	"The Case of the 17 Lakh Suspects (Part - 1)"	4 February 2005
A young man is found dead on Bandra flyover.
352	"The Case of the 17 Lakh Suspects (Concluding part)"	11 February 2005
CID suspect that when the motorcycle collided against the auto the knee of the rider got rammed against the headlight with considerable damage and bleeding.
353	"The Case of the Jewel Thief (Part - 1)"	18 February 2005
Elsewhere a group of friends party takes a dramatic turn when during a game they are playing one of the friends gets stabbed and killed.
354	"The Case of the Jewel Thief (Concluding part)"	25 February 2005
There is a terrible twist in the proceedings. The ambulance carrying the two bodies does not reach the forensic department.
355	"Murder by Numbers (Part - 1) ^{†}"	4 March 2005
A dead body with the number "2" engraved on its forehead is found and CID is called to investigate the case.
356	"Murder by Numbers (Concluding part) ^{†}"	11 March 2005
Sagarika, Red FM's jockey's murder investigations get a sensational twist when CiD officer Daksh shoots down inspector Arjun and is unable to prove his innocence.
357	"Double DNA (Part - 1)"	18 March 2005
Within a week there are two identical murders.
358	"Double DNA (Concluding part)"	25 March 2005
CID continue their investigation based on two clues given by forensics.
359	"The Fortune Teller (Part - 1)"	1 April 2005
The team of CID is called for investigating the deaths of two men as they died under mysterious circumstances.
360	"The Fortune Teller (Concluding part)"	8 April 2005
As the investigation continues, Daya gets shot but is able to survive with some injuries.
361	"The Case of the Engraved Grains (Part - 1)"	15 April 2005
A man seeks help of someone travelling from Jodhpur to Mumbai, by sending a bag full of rice grains to the office of CID.
362	"The Case of the Engraved Grains (Part - 2)"	22 April 2005
The team finds out that a group of some outsiders are responsible for the smuggling of Uranium and also the Judge's daughter is involved in the racket.
363	"The Case of the Engraved Grains (Part - 3)"	29 April 2005
In hot pursuit of uranium, CID reaches Jodhpur and continue their investigation.
364	"The Case of the Stolen Ring (Part - 1)"	6 May 2005
A kid becomes really close to Abhijeet. Abhijeet is also the head of security and is in charge of a precious diamond ring that is in exhibition.
365	"The Case of the Stolen Ring (Concluding part)"	13 May 2005
As the investigation continues, the team finds a strange tattooed man in the video chewing a gum.
366	"The Case of the Killer Lake (Part - 1)"	20 May 2005
Daya is held responsible for the death of one of their colleagues at the bureau.
367	"The Case of the Killer Lake (Concluding part)"	27 May 2005
Abhijeet conducts the hunt of the hero only to find out that he is dead too.
368	"The Case of the Staged Murder (Part - 1)"	3 June 2005
When an actress accidentally stabs the actor in the play to death, CID team launches their investigation to find out who replaced the fake knife with the real one.
369	"The Case of the Staged Murder (Concluding part)"	10 June 2005
The CID team is taken aback to know that a lot of people had reasons why they would want the actor dead.
370	"Abhijeet Sawant Under Arrest (Part - 1)"	17 June 2005
ACP receives a tip that one of his team members is planning to take on another member. He conducts a search of their houses to avert the eventuality. Later, Abhijeet Sawant, the winner of Indian Idol 1 is charged with the murder.
371	"Abhijeet Sawant Under Arrest (Concluding part)"	24 June 2005
CID team learns of other possibilities involved in the girl's murder. The doctor and the girl's father, both are now suspects.
372	"Code Name Banjara (Part - 1)"	1 July 2005
Abhijeet gets attacked while conducting his investigation on Daya and Daksh. Daksh informs him that someone offered him money to kill Daya.
373	"Code Name Banjara (Concluding part)"	8 July 2005
The team of CID gets a tip that the body of real Colonel Banjara has been found with 11 digit numbers written on his arm.
374	"The Case of the Mysterious Truck (Part - 1)"	15 July 2005
On a busy street a lady's bag is found that was smelling of gun powder. Fearing that it could have a bomb, CID team is called for investigation.
375	"The Case of the Mysterious Truck (Concluding part)"	22 July 2005
As the investigation continues, it is revealed in the forensics lab that both the murders took place in different places.
376	"Man Eater (Part - 1)"	29 July 2005
Someone is going around kidnapping women from a set of television series. The bodies of these women soon turn up, half eaten.
377	"Man Eater (Concluding part)"	5 August 2005
While undercover, Aditi begins searching the set suspecting that the cameraman is behind the killings.
378	"Mad Bomber (Part - 1) ^{†}"	12 August 2005
A mad criminal named Bandora sends a letter to CID, threatening to set off a bomb in the city every four hours if he is not paid five crore rupees.
379	"Mad Bomber (Part - 4) ^{†} ^{*}"	19 August 2005
It is found out that Bandora died of a heart attack soon after posting the letter with the bomb threat to CID.
380	"Strange Revenge (Part - 1) ^{†}"	26 August 2005
Abhijeet is accused of destroying evidence from a murder case to save his friend, a film star.
381	"Strange Revenge (Part - 6) ^{†}"	2 September 2005
The Special Bureau's investigation reveals that Rakhi has been hiding at her hairdresser's home since finding out that she will be a mother, and that she has recently left to go to a coffee house to take money from someone.
382	"Watery Grave (Part - 1)"	9 September 2005
When the monsoon rains cause floods in Mumbai, dozens of bodies of people who have drowned are found by the CID.
383	"Watery Grave (Concluding part)"	16 September 2005
Forensic investigation of the victim's body reveals that the water inside his lungs is not rainwater, but rather tapwater, likely from a bathroom somewhere.
384	"The Case of the Dead Waiter (Part - 1)"	23 September 2005
A model is in the middle of a photoshoot at a hotel, when a man falls off a balcony into the hotel swimming pool, dying.
385	"The Case of the Dead Waiter (Concluding part)"	30 September 2005
An investigation into Ganpath life reveals that he had recently brought his sister 3 lakh rupees for her wedding, very mysteriously.
386	"3 Rat Cat 3 (Part - 1)"	7 October 2005
CID officers are summoned to a house fire, where they find multiple burnt bodies, and one man, whose life they save on the verge of death.
387	"3 Rat Cat 3 (Concluding part)"	14 October 2005
During an investigation of the burnt house, CID officers come across a strange ring. When forensic experts scan the ring, they find that the ring has an extra coat on it, hiding something underneath- a phrase, that says "3 Rat Cat 3".
388	"Face Off (Part - 1)"	21 October 2005
Abhijeet and Daya receive a message from the TCP, summoning them to a special location, where they find out that a CID officer is being investigated for a suspected conspiracy against the nation.
389	"Face Off (Part - 2)"	28 October 2005
On the other side of the city, a man is found on the verge of death. He is rushed to the hospital, but his life cannot be saved. However, before dying, when asked who did this to him, he points to one of the CID officers - ACP Pradyuman.
390	"Face Off (Part - 3)"	4 November 2005
The CID team is shocked when, in front of their very eyes, ACP Pradyuman shoots at officer Daksh and flees, refusing to believe that he could do such a thing. The DIG responds by telling Abhijeet and Daya to kill their ACP.
391	"Face Off (Part - 4)"	11 November 2005
Amidst orders from the DIG to kill ACP Pradyuman, Abhijeet finds out that the ACP has left for London. Despite this, Abhijeet lies and instead tells the DIG that the ACP has left for Uganda.
392	"Trail in London (Part - 1)"	18 November 2005
ACP Pradyuman is in London, searching for a criminal named Degendu, but to no avail. Meanwhile in Mumbai, Nakul attempts to murder Daksh on his hospital bed, but ACP Prithviraj and his team manage to save him.
393	"Trail in London (Part - 2)"	25 November 2005
ACP Pradyuman finally finds Degendu, who has now become a simple man leading a life away from crime.
394	"Trail in London (Part - 3)"	2 December 2005
Degendu betrays ACP Pradyuman and calls the local police on him. But before they can catch the ACP, he escapes, and manages to find the café from the photo
395	"Murder by Marriage (Part - 1)"	9 December 2005
A groom is shot and killed at a wedding parade.
396	"Murder by Marriage (Concluding part)"	16 December 2005
A further investigation reveals that the gunshot came from the bride's home, not far away, from a gun belonging to the bride's father.
397	"Poison in the Nail (Part - 1)"	23 December 2005
A fight between two women models begins at a fashion show. Things turn sour when one of the models collapses in the middle of the fight, and dies.
398	"Poison in the Nail (Concluding part)"	30 December 2005
A twist in the tale develops when it is found through a deeper forensic investigation that Reva, the model, died by ingesting poison.

^{†} Denotes crossover with CID Special Bureau
^{*} Denotes extended 1 hour episode

== 2006 ==
Episode	Title	Original release date
399	"Mental Cruelty (Part - 1)"	6 January 2006
A woman named Kalpana breaks down at a departmental store, screaming out that her husband wants to kill her.
400	"Mental Cruelty (Concluding part)"	13 January 2006
As Abhijeet begins questioning Kalpana's husband, a couple on the other side of Mumbai have their date rudely interrupted when the woman finds a man's finger inside her drink.
401	"Yellow Roses (Part - 1)"	20 January 2006
Rita threatens Peter by saying if he marries anyone else, she would commit suicide.
402	"Yellow Roses (Concluding part)"	27 January 2006
ACP Pradyuman needs to know the mystery of the flower.
403	"Killer Whistle (Part - 1)"	3 February 2006
A tune playing next to the scene of crime takes the CID to a studio owned by famous musician Baba Sehgal.
404	"Killer Whistle (Concluding part)"	10 February 2006
The forensic team needs to match Baba's whistle with the recorded audio to have any sort of case against him.
405	"Return of the Jewel Thief"	10 March 2006
Tipu Sultan's ancient jewelry is up for auction, but a famous jewel thief has his eyes on it.
406	"Merchant of Death"	17 March 2006
While a serial killer terrorizes the city, a psychic gets in touch with ACP Pradyuman, wishing to predict a death.
407	"Letter From Past"	24 March 2006
A woman who was house hunting was warned by her neighbors to not buy the house she liked, as it was ominous according to them.
408	"The Case of the Killer Dream"	31 March 2006
A man wakes up next to his dead wife without any recollection of what happened the night before.
409	"The Case of the Baby Killer"	7 April 2006
A blind, a deaf and a mute man witness a crime in a grocery store. A person wearing a Burkha chases a woman carrying a baby, she gives the baby to the deaf man and escapes.
410	"The Case of the Mysterious Shadow"	14 April 2006
A blind woman reaches out to the CID and informs them about an intruder who visits her room at night and looks for some documents.
411	"Dynamite"	21 April 2006
A truck full of dynamite goes missing and a huge explosion takes part in a different part of the city.
412	"Murder at Midnight"	28 April 2006
Mumbai wakes up to a shock when a body wrapped in a mattress is found.
413	"Murder on 97.1 FM"	5 May 2006
Mumbai wakes up to a shock when a body wrapped in a mattress is found.
414	"The Murder in the Safety Vault"	12 May 2006
A famous safe making company puts out an ad saying they'd reward anyone who breaks their unbreakable lock.
415	"The Secret of Code No. 571E1115"	19 May 2006
Spreading exponentially, a deadly virus threatens the city's extinction.
416	"Red Rose Killer"	26 May 2006
An investigation into Sheetal's murder leads them to a serial killer on the run. The infamous Red Rose killer gets critically injured in the altercation but refuses that he killed Sheetal.
417	"CID Undercover"	2 June 2006
ACP Pradyuman goes to help his friend's son on a detective mission. But unfortunately, as soon as he reaches, he gets news about Karan's death. The local police catch ACP Pradyuman at the crime scene in a disguise.
418	"The Halloween Murders"	9 June 2006
A man is found dead with only a note that said ' aajke baad betaal ped se kabhi nahi utrega'.
419	"Return of the Dead Child"	16 June 2006
A woman starts fighting with another woman in the grocery store claiming that she was the real mother of the child.
420	"Body in a Suitcase"	23 June 2006
A decapitated body of a young struggling actress is found on the road.
421	"Monsoon Mystery"	30 June 2006
A film crew finds a corpse in a pit while shooting on set.
422	"Suicide Pact"	7 July 2006
A mysterious body is found inside a Mumbai BEST bus.
423	"Film Piracy Racket"	14 July 2006
A film piracy scandal that leads to the death of Akash, someone who ACP Pradyuman knew on a personal level.
424	"The Mysterious Mr. Arvind"	21 July 2006
A student accuses her teacher of having involvement in one of her friend's disappearances.
425	"Killer in the Jungle"	28 July 2006
A man-eating panther has been terrorising the area. Few environmentalists and students find a victim in the jungle.
426	"The Case of the Mystereous Gift"	4 August 2006
CID Inspector Abhijit is accosted by a young woman in a bookshop and demands for a gift that her husband had left for her.
427	"60 Feet Underwater"	11 August 2006
Akram is having an argument with Danesh over his girlfriend Natasha at a party thrown by the former.
428	"Traitors in CID"	18 August 2006
A couple spots a group of terrorists talking about a bomb being placed in the city. CID Inspector Muskaan is kidnapped and to save her, Daya and Abhijeet help a criminal, leading to them being suspended from CID.
429	"The Secret of the Deadly Chest"	25 August 2006
A leading actress Khushi, buys an old house but when she shifts there she finds a skull there along with jewellery in a chest but the moment she touches the jewellery, her hands get burned.
430	"The Invisible Eyewitness"	1 September 2006
A woman named Vyoma entered her house and found her husband's hand in the room.
431	"The Return of the Dead Man"	8 September 2006
During a robbery in a departmental store, a man dies.
432	"The Secret of Table No. 6"	15 September 2006
CID gets a call at a restaurant where the caller reveals that a murder is going to take place on the same table where the CID team is sitting.
433	"The Motorcycle Thief"	22 September 2006
A man wearing a mask on a motorcycle steals a bag from an old man.
434	"The Case of the Killer Eyes"	29 September 2006
Moksh, a bank employee is getting a picture clicked at a photo studio and while getting clicked he starts bleeding and dies.
435	"Poisonous Relationship"	6 October 2006
Karan is suffering from stomach pain from the past two months and tells this to his friend Rahul.
436	"The Secret of Scorpions"	13 October 2006
A girl working at a store near a petrol pump spots a woman being kidnapped and abducted by a man.
437	"Puzzling Suicides"	20 October 2006
A group of friends are left stranded on the road when their car gets stolen. They ask for a lift from Abhijit and Daya.
438	"The Case of the Bizarre Suicide"	27 October 2006
A brother and sister are quarrelling in a hotel room and they hear a gun sound. Upon finding out they find Mr Brijesh Kumar dead in his room.
439	"The Case of Double Identity"	3 November 2006
An unidentified man meets with an accident on a rainy night and is admitted in the ICU.
440	"Hostage"	10 November 2006
A guy at a restaurant is taking photographs of another man who notices him doing so and shoots him dead.
441	"The Case of the Killer Statues"	17 November 2006
Things get out of hand when Sanjana complains that the statue is moving towards her and she dies.
442	"The Case of the Killer Dogs"	24 November 2006
A famous model enters a posh bungalow looking for a guy called Karan when she is brutally attacked by dogs and she dies.
443	"The Case of the Stolen Car"	1 December 2006
A woman's car is checked at the check post and upon finding, a man is found dead in the backseat of the car.
444	"Masks"	8 December 2006
A group of friends spot an abandoned car with a dead body.
445	"Flash Back"	15 December 2006
A girl named Sonali goes to meet a man named Ketan in a shopping mall but when she reaches there, she finds Ketan stabbed to death.
446	"Crazy Murders"	22 December 2006
A professor comes running into the bureau and asks for help. After calming him down, he forgets what he was talking about and leaves the bureau.
447	"Chasing The Tatoo"	29 December 2006
A retired policeman who is known for his sharpshooting skills gets shot while he is trying to escape.

== 2007 ==
Episode	Title	Original release date
448	"The Case of the Haunted House"	5 January 2007
A couple is offered a bungalow in the price of a flat. When they enter the flat they hear voices of a lady asking for help.
449	"Fashion Death"	12 January 2007
During a jewellery fashion show, showstopper Saloni accidentally dies after a power cut at the venue.
450	"The Case of the Missing Princess"	19 January 2007
A woman enters a hotel and robs all the money of a man from his room. While she is on the run, a man is found dead with a knife stabbed in his bag.
451	"Call Centre Murders"	26 January 2007
CID begins its investigation on the mysterious death of a girl working in a call centre whose body was found in the overhead water tank.
452	"The Case of the Death Sentence"	2 February 2007
CID receives an anonymous tip that Jagan, a renowned gangster, has runaway from jail and there is a lakh rupees stashed in the parking of a mall.
453	"The Case of the Deadly Video Game"	9 February 2007
CID team receives a shocking call from a video game parlor, that a gamer has a heart attack while playing an action game.
454	"The Case of the Bomb Robbery"	16 February 2007
CID team is called by a woman as she narrowly escapes death at a merger party.
455	"The Case of the Scandalous Murder"	23 February 2007
The producer of a movie replaces her actress, without a second thought, as she ignores her call. The new actress faces a dilemma as her boyfriend forces her to give up the role as it involves intimacy. She is later found dead due to poisoning.
456	"Murder of the Killer"	2 March 2007
CID team is informed about a dead body that is found in the woods.
457	"The Case of the Dangerous Lady"	9 March 2007
Naresh is found dead in a hotel and at the same time, Dhiraj is found dead in a discotheque after being captivated by a girl named Indu.
458	"Body in Mid Air"	16 March 2007
Just before attending an auditors meeting, Chairman Sid jumps out of the window of a skyscraper but his body is nowhere to be found.
459	"The Case of the Headless Corpse"	23 March 2007
The brutal murder of a famous jewelers son named Deepak Patel, who was kidnapped a few days ago leads the team of CID to investigate a case wherein the killer has beheaded the body.
460	"CID at Ransom"	30 March 2007
An uninvited guest at Dr Salunkhe's party holds him captive at gunpoint. His only wish is to meet ACP Pradyuman.
461	"The Case of the Body Transplants"	6 April 2007
A series of murders where the organs of the body are removed and then burnt to death puts the team of CID in a fix.
462	"The Case of the Missing Bride"	13 April 2007
A woman named Krutika disturbs the warm atmosphere of a restaurant as she rushes in with injuries on her body.
463	"The Case of the False Robbery"	20 April 2007
Rahil and Ashima discuss something suspicious and reach a cottage wherein they meet an injured man at their doorstep.
464	"The Case of the Repressed Memory"	27 April 2007
A man was taking steam bath.Someone locked the door of bathroom.The man died of suffocation.
465	"Murder in the Air"	4 May 2007
A famous page 3 journalist Tanvi Prakash goes missing after poisonous fumes in the air are found at her house which puts the life of her students at stake.
466	"The Mystery of the Missing Child"	11 May 2007
A young mother with a history of psychological disorder comes to a hotel with her daughter who goes missing but the staff at the hotel claim that she came alone.
467	"The Great Diamond Robbery"	18 May 2007
An NRI named Manik is found dead after he was made to swallow a diamond and his wife Shreya is on the run.
468	"The Case of the Talking Parrot"	25 May 2007
A burnt car is found with a dead body inside it. On arrival of the team of CID, Inspector Daya and Dr Salunkhe are convinced that the dead body is of Inspector Abhijeet who was on a secret mission.
469	"The Case of the Killer Hospital"	1 June 2007
Dev Prakash slips from the stairs and falls down just when he has taken a decision that his family is not in favour of. While being operated, Dev Prakash is strangled to death.
470	"The Mystery of the Room No. 17"	15 June 2007
CID discovers decaying corpses of girls from Raipur who had visited Mumbai for a weekend visit.
471	"The Case of the Murderous Affair"	22 June 2007
Malini, Payal and Sunita were three married women who were cheating on their husbands and are found dead.
472	"The Case of the Perfect Murder"	6 July 2007
A popular college - Summerfield is a witness to three gruesome murders.
473	"7 Days to Die"	13 July 2007
Christina has given all her assets, properties and bank balance to her foster son Rokesh and is hosting a party to celebrate the inheritance. The biological members don't look happy and in front of everyone's eyes, Rokesh and Christina collapse.
474	"The Case of the Invisible Killer"	20 July 2007
A lone girl, carefree and unaware of what fate has in store for her, casually strolls on a busy market street.
475	"Revenge of the Criminal"	27 July 2007
Inspector Abhijeet is missing and a girl is abducted and shot dead by goons.
476	"Room with a View"	3 August 2007
Vishwajeet, a resident of a society complex has a bad habit of peeping into people's flats with his binoculars. One day, he witnesses the murder of a woman while peering the windows of a nearby flat.
477	"The Don's Final Revenge"	10 August 2007
Don, a drug kingpin caught and jailed by CID is back from prison, and he wants his revenge on CID.
478	"Return of the Clown"	17 August 2007
A series of unusual kidnappings take the city by storm when an old man, a teenaged girl, and a young 7 year old boy are kidnapped with no ransom calls.
479	"The Case of the Vanishing Magician"	24 August 2007
Gaayabi's show turns sour when he is about to enact his famous disappearing act- Gaayabi vanishes into thin air and a badly battered dead body reappears in his place.
480	"The Case of Dr. O's Missing Treasure"	31 August 2007
Dr. O, an infamous international art thief once betrayed by his gang members, has tracked his former friends in search of revenge- and the fortune they stole from him.
481	"The Case of Inspector Daya's Abduction"	7 September 2007
Vivek and Daya land up at a rave chasing a lead on the local drug mafia. As Vivek and Daya begin search the place amongst the dazed crowd, Daya suddenly disappears.
482	"Return of the Spirit"	14 September 2007
Dr. Hrishikesh is a nuclear scientist, recovering from the untimely death of his daughter, Shweta.
483	"The Case of the Talking Wall"	21 September 2007
A beautiful young woman Megha is being stalked by someone. After terrorizing her for some time, he murders her in a rather strange manner.
484	"The Cures of the Rose Queen"	28 September 2007
Ms. Rose Queen, one of the most prestigious beauty contests in the modelling industry is being revived after a seven years hiatus, after the last winner, Kimmie, was found dead soon after she was crowned.
485	"The Case of the Uninvited Guest"	5 October 2007
It is the wedding of the youngest son of Dhanraaj, a high-profile industrialist. But this joyous occasion turns tragic when Dhanraj's eldest son, Girish, is shot dead, mouthing the letter "O" on his deathbed.
486	"The Case of Double Cross Murder"	12 October 2007
A young woman Sheela is found murdered - shot in the chest by her landlady, Malti.
487	"The Case of Murder by Diamond"	19 October 2007
CID come across a case where a robber has been killed inside a jewellery store.
488	"Murder on Sets"	26 October 2007
An actress, Suhanna, has a verbal spat with one of her co-stars on set, and soon after, is found dead in the makeup room.
489	"The Clue in the Burnt Tooth"	2 November 2007
A young couple discovers dismantled human bones inside a shed.
490	"Just Body in the Cement"	9 November 2007
A man is shopping in a busy market when he spots a girl who recognizes- it is Ira, his best friend Dev's daughter. The problem is that Ira has been dead for about a year.
491	"The Onstage Murder"	16 November 2007
A stand-up comedian named Jaggu Tattoria collapses and dies onstage in the middle of a performance.
492	"The Mystery of the Dead Passenger"	23 November 2007
As an overnight train pulls into a railway station, a girl sleeping on a berth is hit by a bag- when she falls on the floor, dead.
493	"The Killer Thugs"	30 November 2007
CID rush to the house of an old man named Raghavendra, whose daughter Anita has come from Bangalore after hearing about her father's death.
494	"The Case of the Killer Machines"	7 December 2007
A series of air conditioner blasts in people's homes all over the city end up killing some people.
495	"The Case of the Mysterious Body Farm"	14 December 2007
A middle-aged woman fall unconscious in a shopping mall after she spots her son, Mehul, who died some time ago.
496	"One Missing Girl"	21 December 2007
Abhijeet is jogging at the beach in the morning, when he sees a girl in the sea shouting out for help. He attempts to rescue her, but by the time he reaches her, she has mysteriously vanished with no trace.
497	"Happy New Year"	28 December 2007
On the eve of New Year, CID is investigating the brutal murder of a man in a room filled with computers, cables, wires and laptops.

== 2008 ==
Episode	Title	Original release date
498	"Picnic Spot or a Maze"	4 January 2008
A man, Rohan, sees a young woman being forced into a car by a man, and tries to help her, following the car and calling CID for help.
499	"A Witness is in Danger"	11 January 2008
Rohan informs CID about a man who was trying to abduct a woman.
500	"Killer Peanut"	18 January 2008
A famous industrialist Chaman is celebrating his birthday with a lavish party at his house when his wife Malvika gets killed and he gets missing.
501	"Illusion"	25 January 2008
A man returning from work finds his wife stranded in the middle of nowhere. He gets curious, as she wasn't supposed to be there.
502	"The Rear Window"	1 February 2008
Two people are found dead in an apartment with two pistols lying next to them.
503	"Haunted House"	8 February 2008
A journalist who wanted to debunk myths about the existence of ghosts, spends a night at a haunted house. Only to be found dead the next morning.
504	"Dual Faces"	15 February 2008
A couple Saahil and Preity are coming out of a horror film, leaving it midway as Preity was dead scared.
505	"The Gift"	22 February 2008
Ruhaan's night of celebration turns horrid when he bites into something brittle inside his birthday cake. On closer inspection, it turns out to be some sort of a bone.
506	"The Mystery of the Dead Thief"	29 February 2008
A bunch of youngsters on the terrace partying, notice a man hanging on the neighbor's grill.
507	"The Case of the Forgetful Girl"	7 March 2008
A semiconscious terrified woman is found by a few kids playing next to the woods.
508	"Dangerous Swimming Pool"	14 March 2008
A man who decides to go for a swim and suddenly dies as soon as he hits the water.
509	"A Red Holi"	21 March 2008
A weeping six-year-old girl is found on the street, lost and confused. When asked about her parents, she seems confused and shows a piece of paper with "CID inspector Daya" written on it.
510	"Who is the Culprit?"	28 March 2008
CID finds a man injured on the road, the team rushes the man to the hospital.
511	"The Jungle Trekking"	4 April 2008
A prank kidnapping turns serious. Four friends lose their lives and with them are lost all the clues.
512	"The Contract Killings"	11 April 2008
A fight between two friends at a restaurant turns deadly when one of the girl's snatches her friend's wig out and she collapses.
513	"The Case of the Invisible Killer"	18 April 2008
For the first time, somebody is on CID's trail, instead of the other way around. There is danger to the life of one of the members of the CID team - the ACP, their chief.
514	"The Wrong Victim"	25 April 2008
The lead actor dies in a bomb blast which was actually supposed to be a stunt scene.
515	"The Twisted Family"	2 May 2008
A renowned builder is assassinated with the help of some sort of allergen.
516	"Wedding Jitter"	9 May 2008
A man is found dead inside a room which was locked from the inside.
517	"The Case of the Mysterious Mask"	16 May 2008
A beach, a masquerade-themed party, some unknown faces, some known and some photographs that shouldn't be public. All these lead to a murder mystery by the beach.
518	"Bad Blood"	23 May 2008
Vicky is found murdered in his car on the road.
519	"The Case of the Missing Bride"	30 May 2008
Upcoming Bollywood actor Rajeev Khandelwal's life is getting engaged to his ladylove Anjali on the eve of the release of his first film Aamir.
520	"The Secret of the Killer Sword"	6 June 2008
Reva wants to take revenge from Dr. Rajesh as she was married to him and had a son (Sunny) from their relationship.
521	"Unlucky Fortune Teller"	13 June 2008
Disha, a fortune teller tells Kavita, a jewellery shop owner, that her daughter Jhanvi's life is in grave danger. Soon after, a robbery and murder take place at Kavita's jewellery store. CID's prime suspect in the case is Kavita's daughter, Jahnvi who is missing. The case takes a sharp, dark turn when Jhanvi's body is found in the jungle.
522	"The Cursed Necklace"	20 June 2008
Fredricks get invited to Actress Shyla's daughter's film launch. On the night of the launch, there seems to be a technical issue and the lights go off for a few minutes. When the lights come back on, certain pieces of jewelry go missing. Nobody is allowed to leave until searched thoroughly. But to everyone's surprise, a bracelet is recovered from Fredricks. The guests turn on him but he refuses the allegations. ACP Pradyuman and his team take it upon itself to clear Fredrick's name in the matter and start their hunt for the stolen necklace.
523	"Crime Target: ACP Pradyuman"	27 June 2008
While investigating a woman's abduction case, ACP Pradyuman falls prey to a meticulously planned trap. He is kidnapped by a criminal holding a severe personal grudge. The kidnapper intends to force the ACP to hang himself so his death can be flashed across the next day's newspapers.
524	"The Goodbye Kiss"	4 July 2008
Akansha and Shekhar, both actors, were shooting for a commercial on set, when Akanksha collapses to the ground and dies right after taking a sip of the drink they were shooting for.
525	"The Case of the Killer TV Show"	11 July 2008
A young girl loses her life by drowning on the first day of shoot for a reality show. The producer calls the CID for investigation. The victim seems to be the granddaughter of a prominent judge.
526	"Missing Dead Body"	18 July 2008
Sanya, a singer is very protective of her sister Monica. She hides Monica's biological mother in her farmhouse. Later, she is missing from her house and there are bloodstains in the house.
527	"The Radio Mania"	25 July 2008
Mitasha is a radio jockey at Mastana FM. One day, an unknown caller threatens to destroy her life while she was on air. She gets into heated argument with her husband who was about to hit her, but interuppted by officier Lavanya. And the next morning, her husband is found dead in her kitchen.
528	"Witness Daya"	1 August 2008
Kailash finds out that her friend Reena has been suffering from domestic violence and decides to confront her husband, Binoy. Reena forbid him to do such thing and asked him to leave the house. The next day, Kailash asks her to meet at an under-construction site and had called Daya for help. While the 3 of them were present, Binoy falls from the terrace and dies.
529	"The Comatose Killer"	8 August 2008
A man is found lying dead in the ICU of a hospital along with a coma patient in the same room. When the CID arrives, the dead body is found missing.
530	"The Case of the Triangular Bullet"	15 August 2008
A dead body was received by the forensics experts of CID, which had an irregular bullet stuck inside it. After further examination, it turned out to be the top part of an antique knife. The dead body is revealed to be of businessmen Akshat when his fake beard and mustache are removed. His family accused his step-sister Kareena who was about to visit London, but her dead body is found inside Akshat's old bungalow.
531	"The Mystery of the Call Center Murders"	22 August 2008
Sanjana works at a call centre and is found dead in the washroom. Everyone heard a gun shot, but surprisingly no wound is found on dead body. Forensic analysis reveals she was poisoned. Next day, her bestfriend Rishabh is found shot dead inside his car in same office parking lot.
532	"The Master Plan"	29 August 2008
A severely injured man suddenly appears in front of a taxi and begs the driver to contact the CID. He died soon after and there is no identity proof with him. The alcohol smell from him only leads to reveal his identity. The team locates the bar where his drink was poisoned.
533	"The Case of the Haunted Treasure"	5 September 2008
A ten-year kid is horrified at the sight of a ghost walking outside his window but his parents didn't believe him, so he seeks help from CID. Fredricks followed the ghost the next night but it vanished behind a tree after a girl's scream, which was also heard by Daya. Upon deep searching the premises, bones have been found buried near that same tree. Later, a historic sword stolen by one runaway actress is found kept hidden inside the same tree's trunk. Dr. Salunkhe found dried bloodstains on that sword revealing it was the actual killing weapon.
534	"The Case of the Wandering Soul"	12 September 2008
Ragini faces death threats from a man that compels her to commit suicide, but is saved by her husband Ishaan who seeks help from the CID. She cleverly escapes from custody of officier Kaveri and jumps into swimming pool killing herself the very next day. This guilt haunts Kaveri and she sees Ragini's spirit everywhere. Even Daya and Frendricks saw the spirit while guarding Kaveri in her house.
535	"Wall of Skeletons"	19 September 2008
A couple, Deepak and Anjali find a skeleton carrying a woman purse inside the wall of their new house and seek help from CID. The CID team immediately questions the previous owner Arun, whose wife Mansi is missing from eight years. Forensic expert Dr. Salunkhe confirms the victim was a young man who was also murdered eight years ago. Suddenly Mansi comes back from nowhere and a woman skeleton is found bricked into another wall of the same house, wearing exact same necklace found in the previous purse. Later Mansi's dying words to Deepak related to storeroom having torn stamp paper unravels all the dark conspiracy.
536	"The Killer Haunted House"	26 September 2008
Aman inherits a haveli from an unknown stranger and decides to move in despite strong reluctance from his wife and father. The very next day, his father is discovered dead in his study. House helpers claim that the murder was committed by the vengeful spirit of a girl named Ruhi, who reportedly died 40 years ago. ACP Pradyuman and his team refuse to believe the supernatural angle and they launch a rigorous investigation.
537	"Accident Or Crime ?"	3 October 2008
A businessman named Ranvijay is found dead inside his crashed car near a bridge what appears to be a road accident. CID find a broken mic near the crime scene. While investigating the leads, the CID team gets to know that a bullet was shot just before the accident. The team decides to look for any bullet related evidence in the car only to fail. The team enquire all places which leads to a woman named Nisha, but she is found strangled to death in her home. The team uncover a massive financial angle of a hefty life insurance policy was taken out under Ranvijay's name that contained a specific clause strictly related to accidental mishap.
538	"A Deadly Sting"	10 October 2008
A TV program hosts a talk show produced by Mr Nath has 4 guests of different background who are there to have a gentle conversation about environment. Two guests, Danny and Ranjan get into a heated argument with each other over a personal matter and Danny decides to escalate the matter by bringing out his gun in the public. A loud gunshot is heard and Ranjan is found dead. Later, a fake publicity stunt staged by flop producer is revealed but strangely it became true. Dr Salunkhe delivers a shocking revelation that a highly lethal scorpion also have bitten Ranjan resulting in large swelling of his leg. The team dedicately found the location of both the real gun and lethal scorpion. This episode has a peculiar milestone as Daya has slapped five different people in a single episode.
539	"The Case of the Suicide Killers"	17 October 2008
Neha jumps from a shopping mall, before killing a man with a gun in the parking. Her boyfriend, Varun kills another man with a knife and started eating ice-cream before leaving that cafe. Later, he also tried to kill himself by jumping off a building. Both dead persons are related to a lawsuit filed by Kailash. Dr Salunkhe reveals both killers were hypnotized to kill and later do suicide. A mentally unstable man named Mayank directed his friend Sunny to carry out the plans and later he also jumped off a building killing himself. Mayank hatched all these to revenge against his love Neha and his father Kailash's fraudsters.
540	"The Case of the Hotel Murder Mystery"	24 October 2008
A locked hotel room and corridor are found splashed with bloodstains. The room was booked by Rajveer, but he is missing. Later a dead body wearing same clothes and ornaments as Rajveer was found in a hospital. Rajveer's wife and brother blamed his business partner Trilok who knew wrestling. Surprisely Rajveer is alive and found in his girlfriend Riya's home. Rajveer's wife is found strangled to death in his home. The dead body was found to be of a shooter named Harry. At the end, Daya and Trilok get into a fierce fight when the later refused his crime of killing Ranjveer's wife after he was cheated by her.
541	"The Case of the Killer Feat"	31 October 2008
Aarav, a movie actor who is forced by his director to perform a highly dangerous jump stunt himself. But when the jump scene is executed, a horrible accident takes the actor's life, prompting the CID team to investigate. Forensics reveal shocking reason of his death. His wife is also found dead in his home, consuming poison.
542	"The Case of the Dancing Killer"	7 November 2008
Choreographer Yuvi is found stabbed to death on the next day after a fight with lead dancer Daina and his boyfriend Robi. Robi is admitted to a hospital in serious condition after his car accident. The comedy scenes of Dr Salunke with ACP, Fredricks and rest of the team is worth watching for. This episode has a peculiar turning point as Daya has slapped a female accused for the first time.
543	"Death Wish"	5 December 2008
Palash along with his wife and son is returning to India as his father's final time is near. The car carrying them is found severely burnt along with 3 dead bodies, but their driver is missing. Forensics reveal that the car was burnt with kerosene and rubber solution, prompting it's a murder. To surprise, a girl claiming to be daughter of Palash arrives at their funeral. The driver was killed by a woman is found by Dr Tarika. This episode marks the start of romantic saga between Abhijeet and Tarika.
544	"The Case of the Mysterious Daughter"	12 December 2008
A woman named Mansi wakes up to doorbell in midnight and finds a gift box at her doorstep which has her chopped ribbon tied hair strand. Forensics reveal that no other fingerprints are found on the box as well as no intruder entry was found in the house. Mansi's father Devprakash is a well-known retired police officer and dear friend of ACP Pradyuman. Later the neighbour girl reveal the real Mansi's identity while all these plans were carried out by fake Mansi to avenge her father's encounter death.
545	"The Stained Dress"	19 December 2008
During the construction on a land, the labourers discover a box which has a blood-stained bridal dress and pieces of a broken vase. The bridal dress has some tobacco and red fibre particles. The fashion designer who designed that dress, had died by suicide due to stress 4 years ago. A police case where she was the witness was found by CID team. The accused in that case is found murdered in his house before the team arrive for questioning. The team dig up all leads and find a buried skeleton inside another house.
546	"The Secret of the Hidden Dagger"	26 December 2008
Four business partners meet at a farmhouse for a confidential business meeting to take an important decision. A power cut happens and, in the darkness, one of the partners named Vikram is stabbed to death. Dr. Salunkhe reveals that the murder weapon has some strange dimensions. The chemical found both in stabbed wound and glass found to be brass polish which leads the team for intense search of the room.

== 2009 ==
Episode	Title	Original release date
547	"The Killer Secret of the Credit Card"	2 January 2009
Team CID discovers a human skeleton from a very renowned resort of the city. During forensic examination, Dr Salunkhe finds out a half-chewed credit card stuck inside the victim's jawline. The team tracks down the card owner who is still alive. He mentioned that his card was stolen 6 months ago. When the team investigates at his office, it is found that one couple and one driver have left the work since that day.
548	"The Case of the Highway Murder"	9 January 2009
2 little girls playing on a hotel room balcony, saw the NRI guest of adjacent room collapsed from his room into balcony floor. They mentioned that they heard a doorbell so the victim went inside the room to check. Daya and Abhijeet found a bullet shell across the highway and an abandoned car inside the bushes. The footprint near the car leads to the sharpshooter, who jumps off from the same hotel terrace during fight with Daya and Abhijeet.
549	"The Case of the World War II Rifle"	16 January 2009
Six college friends go for a picnic at Vijay's farmhouse in Alibaug. A girl named Sakshi gets murdered there and the prime suspect is her friend Manish. Sakshi's boyfriend Rahul tried to kill Manish in enraged state, but intervened by CID team. Dr. Salunkhe reveals a shocking fact that the bullet found in the body is fired from an old World War II rifle. Upon investigating, the team reaches the ex-Colonel's house from where the rifle was stolen. Later, Pooja is also found murdered in her house leading all suspicions towards Nisha.
550	"The Case of the Poisonous Dress"	23 January 2009
During a famous designer's fashion show, her showstopper Niharika goes missing and a model named Reena is found dead on a royal chair wearing an old and torn dress. Later, Niharika is found dead inside a swimming pool. Forensics reveal that both died due to bio-poisoning.
551	"The Case of the Mysterious Tattoo"	30 January 2009
A girl named Sara's dead body is found in an abandoned house. Her father tells CID that she ran away with her boyfriend Armaan on her engagement day. CID assumes that the second dead body in the garden is that of Armaan as it contains name tattoo while face is completely damaged. His friend claims that Armaan has visited London, but hasn't returned yet.
552	"The Case of the Mask Lady"	6 February 2009
A mysterious man walks into a lawyer's office and gave him one lakh rupees advance to help a masked lady claiming his life is in danger. He tears a photo, hands one half to the lawyer while the other to that lady. An empty car with a blood stained coat and a gun lying inside it, was found by CID. Later, a dead body was found in a pond with a lipstick mark on his face.
553	"The Case of the Mysterious Weapon"	13 February 2009
Sapna and Dev are successful actors, who are in a relationship. While shooting for their movie, an unknown man continuously stalks Sapna and leaves a strange Valentine's Day gift inside her vanity van. The stalker follows them to a restaurant. Sapna spots him, confronts him in anger, and slaps him. Next day, Dev is murdered and Sapna's house has bloody messages written all over the wall. Dr Salunkhe is completely baffled on seeing the strange four sided wound on Dev's dead body.
554	"Hot Water Murders"	20 February 2009
The CID team is called to a hotel when a guest named Ujjwal is found dead inside a steam room. Forensic details reveal he was murdered beforehand and staged inside the sauna. The killer only left a muddy footprint, which contains five types of oil. Later, the team found Monica dead inside her house through electric shock. Dr Salunkhe reveal that she actually died due to drowning. Both victims are linked to a businessman named Deven, who was presumed dead in a previous water accident. A similar drowning attempt was done on Monica's manager, but rescued by CID team at last moment. All investigations and found evidences focus heavily on Deven's ex-wife Rewa.
555	"Magic Water Murder"	27 February 2009
A famous magician named Johan performs a dangerous stunt in front of live audience where he must stay locked inside a trunk submerged in water for three hours. He is put into the water when a spectator challenges that Johan of fraud and claims the illusion is a scam. He made the trunk pull out of water, opens it to find empty. Johan has completely vanished from the venue. Johan’s terrified wife arrives at the CID bureau seeking help. She explains that her husband was receiving blackmailed letters previously. Cops start investigating at the pool where they are shocked to find the trunk of the magician in the pool with that spectator's dead body in it. While cops investigate further they find out that Johan knew that man before. CID discovers that they all used to work together under a legendary master magician named Triambak, who died eight years ago. And then the cops find Johan's dead body following his family.
556	"Mystery Code Murders"	6 March 2009
CID gets an anonymous letter challenging them from stopping a murder. The location of the murder hidden inside a complex code sent in the letter. CID solve the code and reach the place, but the murder has already happened. The killer again send a complex code having location, time and name initials of next victim. Upon reaching, they discover the target has already been brutally stabbed multiple times in the chest like previous victim. After receiving one more letter, the team successfully deduce that the code points to specific bus stops in the Gopinagar area and targets an individual with the initials "S.G." who has a pending criminal murder case similar to previous victims. The target is also stabbed to death and japanese word meaning impurity is mentioned beside the dead body exactly like former murders.
557	"The Case of the Green Fingers"	13 March 2009
At a party, a young girl Neelam collapses on the floor and dies. CID team starts investigating and come to know that Neelam's actual boyfriend Sanjay had hired a detective to keep an eye on her. They reach Sanjay place and he leads them to Neelam's parents for further investigation, where they came to know that Neelam had been to some picnic with friends and a professor a month ago. CID get the details about professor Rajiv from Neelam's college, but he was found dead at his place. Later, Akhil the detective is also found dead in his car.
558	"Students Mass Murderer"	20 March 2009
CID find 3 dead bodies of young girls in the water tank of a building. Dr. Salunkhe initially suggests the girls committed suicide by overdosing on sleeping pills before jumping into the tank as there were no external struggle marks. However, the investigation takes a dark turn when a fourth girl's body is discovered in a street trash can. She was choked to death after having similar sleeping pills. On investigating, the team found that all 4 girls didn't know each other but were going to a common coaching centre despite being toppers in their exams.
559	"Werewolf"	27 March 2009
Vijay gets killed followed by Amit and Dhruv. With all the murders being committed in a similar brutal way, it seemed a typical case of serial killing. However, Dr Salunkhe shockingly states that the murders seem to be done by some wild animal after examining all deep wounds. And another twist comes when the witnesses reveals that the killer is actually a werewolf.
560	"The Case of the Run Away Bride"	3 April 2009
A man covered in mud terrifies a young couple looking for some privacy and dies before he can say anything. CID find a gold nose ring with him that leads them to a girl named Rajni in Kerala who has gone missing on the day of her marriage. On investigating, the team found that Rajni knew that man closely as he helped her for modeling photoshoots. 4 more girls also were missing who did photoshoots from him against their families' wishes. ACP promised one girl's father to find their daughter along with Rajni and others.
561	"Khooni Rang Munch"	10 April 2009
A young man named Manoj places a suspicious bet with his friends that something drastic will happen at the rock concert tonight. During end of live concert, the lead singer Milina is shot in the stomach and dies right on stage in front of hundreds of spectators. Amidst chaos, the audience flees in panic, leaving the team with no immediate witnesses, names or addresses. Dr. Salunkhe reconstructs the bullet's trajectory, establishing that the shot was fired from a specific diagonal line of seats. While inspecting the seat and its surroundings, Fredricks discovers a mysterious piece of a torn newspaper left behind by the suspect. The team manages to track down an audience member through his credit card ticket purchase, who sat directly behind the killer. The witness admits the man sitting directly in front had a distinct scorpion tattoo behind his right ear.
562	"Time Will Tell Who is the Killer"	17 April 2009
CID team faces a dilemma when the prime witness's testimony and forensic analysis are contradictory in the murder case of a newly wedded girl Richa. First, it seems as it was a case of robbery as the entire house is completely ransacked and all expensive items including jewelry are missing. The delivery boy says that he heard Richa singing a song inside the apartment right before she was killed. But Dr. Salunkhe says that she has been dead for the past 5-6 hours before the delivery boy ever arrived based on rigor mortis. CID nabs the thief who confessed that he has stolen all the house items, but the girl was already lying dead on the floor when he entered.
563	"The Case of the Bride's Killer"	24 April 2009
Late night, a man named Vishal drives his car to meet a veiled woman as the planned to elope together with a bag full of money. At Vishal's home, a family member found the bride-to-be Tina lying dead on the floor in her bridal attire with her wrist's slit. By tracking Vishal’s mobile, CID team reaches a remote location where Vishal is also found dead. Alok, Vishal's brother is notified that one crore rupees is sloten from his office's locker. During interrogation, Vishal's girlfriend Simran reveals that before she could reach Vishal at their meeting spot that night, another woman dressed wearing a veil approached him. Vishal mistook her as Simran, but she took all money while two goons violently ambushed and killed him. CID tracking the money leads found that dead woman is not the real Tina, but a theatre actress. The real Tina, a bartender girl, was blackmailing Vishal for marriage because she knew he was stealing money from his brother Alok's office.
564	"Who is the Culprit?"	1 May 2009
At her mother's funeral, Komal appears completely unbothered and highly irritated by her mourning relatives, she then abruptly leaves for work. At office, she is visibly furious and lashing out at her staff before entering into her cabin. Just then, Rajiv and Riya went to give her condolence wishes but find her sitting dead on her chair. Dr. Salunkhe delivers a shocking report that Komal did not die sudden cardiac arrest but of slow poisoning. Both Rajiv and Riya are missing since that day. Forensics corrected the cause of death for heavy epilepsy medications although Komal never suffered from epilepsy. CID tracks down the psychotherapist who prescribed such to Riya, who falsely acted as Komal. Whole CID team searches all hotels of Kolhapur for both Rajiv and Riya by tracking their money withdrawal patterns, who in turn leads to the actual mastermind behind all tricks.
565	"The Mystery of the Nameless Girl"	8 May 2009
Inspector Abhijeet comes across an accident case in which the car had two number plates and an injured girl. He searches her handbag and retrieves a driving licence belonging to Anushka. CID team is surprised on reaching the address mentioned to find a woman who claims she is the real Anushka. They return to the hospital to question the impostor, but she is unable to recall her actual identity. Abhijit remembers seeing a restaurant bill in her handbag. Following the restaurant lead, the CID team uncovers an active criminal network consisting the nameless girl alongside two male accomplices who have operated many dangerous kidnappings.
566	"Killer Kitty Party"	15 May 2009
Rani is found dead in a hotel room where she had gone to attend a kitty party. Three other women Chandni, Preeti and Nidhi were also supposed to be there. Abhijeet found a fired bullet shell from the hotel room and later recovered a gun from laundry room. CID uncovers that Rani maintained two separate houses, living with one husband in each. The team uncovers a buried corpse, identifying it as her real deceased husband. Rani had killed her own husband and the other man was actually her boyfriend with whom she was having an extra-marital affair.
567	"Killer Painting"	22 May 2009
A dead body with stab wound in forensic reveals that weapon used was a painting knife. CID follows the trail and reach an art gallery of an eccentric painter with the history of violence. They meet his secretary who informs them that he is outstation on a trip. Surprisingly as they follow the painter, he goes missing as the suspicion is raised over his business partner who is also killed eventually by poisoning. Just as they reach dead end, the painter comes back and accuses his own son of attempting to kill him.
568	"The Secret of a Murder - A Sound"	29 May 2009
A couple return home late at night and are shocked to see their house ransacked, drops of blood and an old aged man in their house. CID find out that the man is suffering from dementia, but forensic evidence matching the blood in the house proves he was a direct eyewitness to a murder. A body of an unknown young woman has been found dumped in a scrapyard outside the city, later identified as Nandita. She was working for a major city publishing house owned by a wealthy businessman named Deven. Deven was having a secret extramarital affair with her and shockingly Deven is revealed to be the old man's son whose name is Chandrakant. Deven and his wife Priya had abandoned him due to his illness.
569	"Killer Pond"	5 June 2009
Senior Inspector Daya has suddenly gone completely off-grid, refusing to answer calls from ACP Pradyuman or Abhijeet. A distressed mother along with three youngsters arrive at the bureau with the missing complaint of her son Amit. His friends doubt Rahul with whom Amit had a fight. A car has been found submerged in a lake belonging to Amit, but the dead body found in water is of another boy called Soham. CID arrive at Soham's house to discover that someone broke into the house and stole his laptop, later revealed to be Daya by his neighbour. Meanwhile, Priya also goes missing. The dead bodies of Amit and Priya also recovered from the same lake. ACP Pradyuman and Abhijeet trace Daya finally who revealed that Soham and his group of friends had hacked all CID database along with officiers' mobiles. All things are connected with the death of a boy named Sunny six months before, who was studying in Amit's college.
570	"The Case of the Mysterious Corpse"	12 June 2009
A severely burnt dead body is found in a burning godown. Both the watchman and owner are clueless about it. To make things more complicated, cops later find out that the corpse has no fingerprints. A new officer Tasha is facing an evaluation to determine if she will officially stay or not.
571	"Wax Bullet"	19 June 2009
Tanuj, a businessman get shot at his own house by an unidentified assassin. Tanuj's wife reveals that a mysterious, unnamed woman had been stalking Tanuj for several days before his murder. While searching the perimeter, the officers found a gun later revealed to belonging a man named Abhimanyu, who recently filed a theft report for it. CID visits Abhimanyu's house, only to discover that he is missing and his wife was blackmailed to kill Tanuj using her husband's stolen gun. But froze in fear at the final moment , she dropped the weapon and fled the scene without ever pulling the trigger. Investigation reveals that Tanuj, the missing Abhimanyu, and a third man named Roshan were close friends. Nine years ago, the trio committed a murder. To save themselves, they meticulously framed an innocent man named Shobhit, sending him to prison for their crime.
572	"Killer News"	26 June 2009
Roshni, a famous journalist, exposes the clandestine operations of Rakesh Kumar, a rich businessman. Dharmesh, who had helped Roshni in exposing Rakesh Kumar, is found dead the next day, in Roshni's car. Investigation reveals that Dharmesh was killed by a man named Girish. However, before the team can capture him, Girish is also found dead. Rakesh Kumar, the initial prime suspect, was also found murdered in his house and surprisingly Dr Salukhe reveals that Girish was killed by Rakesh.
573	"Mysterious Corpse"	3 July 2009
A man discovers drops of blood on his car roof. He calls the CID and takes them to the places he went which includes a mall where they find a dead body on top of a pipe where the car was parked in the basement. The deceased is identified as the co-owner of the shopping mall. Forensics reveal that the victim was murdered inside the mall using an empty syringe, and the body was transported to the parking lot via a shopping trolley till the parking lot. CID team traces the killer through his newly purchased shoes.
574	"The Case of the Dead Body in Pieces"	10 July 2009
A wealthy woman is all set to buy a new huge resort property, soon discovers a butchered leg that belonged to a woman, and CID is called for investigation. The woman thought that the manager had murdered the owner as she didn't attend the meeting. However, it was soon revealed that the leg belonged to a woman who had been murdered and her other body pieces are found from different areas. Through the carry bag in which some body pieces have been dumped along with some clothes, CID managed to establish the girl's identity to be Malvika and she worked in a garment export house. Also, she was the ex-fiancée of the owner Laksh who was now all set to marry his business partner Ira. Malvika was missing since 3 months and had left a letter for Laksh. CID tracked down the house where she kept in captivity before she was murdered. Her lover was nabbed from the house of her interior designer, who was found stabbed.
575	"The Case of the Anonymous Dead Body"	17 July 2009
In a train station, a headless body is found inside a trunk. Forensic analysis reveals that the deceased had swine flu. Further investigation reveals that the man was beheaded in a house near a bakery from where the trunk was stolen. Digging up the soil directly in front of the house belonging to Sattu, the team finally unearths the missing severed head to confirm his identity as Naresh. Both knew each other very well since their old company and Naresh made Sattu lose his job due to robbery. Later Sattu is found dead and his friend revealed the truth that actually Naresh stole money from his company. He paid Sattu every month to hide his crime, which was committed because of his drug addiction.
576	"Ghost Murderer"	24 July 2009
A maid is killed in a hotel presumably by the dead manager according to staffs. On investigation, the CID team finds out that he committed suicide by setting himself on fire in front of many people. During investigation in the hotel, there is another sighting of the dead manager. Security officer who left his job few days ago, is missing. CID team traced the evidences and recovered 6 crore rupees carefully hidden under a water fountain in hotel garden. Both manager and security officer defrauded a wealthy man by selling him the same hotel through forged documents.
577	"Killer Chess"	31 July 2009
A husband and wife are enjoying their dinner at home, when suddenly, the husband gets shot dead. CID investigate and find that he's been shot from an under-construction building. When they reach there, one more dead body is found. From scattered broken glass pieces, the team tracked down the car present at that site. One property builder, close enemy of 2nd dead man becomes the prime suspect as his gun's bullet is found inside 1st dead man's head. His wife is found now dead in another under construction builing, which makes the case more complex.
578	"Invisible Bullet"	7 August 2009
A man is killed in a movie theatre in front of 40 witnesses. No gun or even a trace of gunpowder can't be found anywhere. Dr Salunkhe discovers that though there is a bullet wound, no bullet is present inside the man's chest. CID discovers that an actress named Rakhi was present in the same theater when the man was shot. She reveals she had been receiving anonymous life-threatening phone calls and fears the bullet was actually meant to assassinate her. CID team traces the calls and reach a house and are shocked to see Dr Salunkhe and Dr Tarika there, confronting a rogue inventor. The man admits he made the invisible bullet, but he couldn't made the gun for it.
579	"Impersonator ^{*}"	14 August 2009
A famous criminal named Rocky takes the face of one of CID's officers and infiltrates the CID team. His mission is to destroy CID on Independence Day.
580	"The Case of the Missing Girls"	21 August 2009
The burnt dead body of a girl is found in the jungle, without any trace of an identity.
581	"The Case of the Ancient Fingerprint"	28 August 2009
A 2000-year-old Egyptian mummy is found in a casket under the dead body of a watchman at a restaurant.
582	"Killer Mask"	4 September 2009
Mohan, a mentally ill student of a failed playwright who committed suicide, believes that his dead mentor's unfinished play must be brought to its proper end.
583	"Killer Piracy Racket"	11 September 2009
A man found is murdered outside a mall, shot dead by a biker. Meanwhile, Salman Khan contacts CID to inform them about his film Wanted getting pirated before its release and they set out to stop the piracy racket.
584	"Bloody Game ^{*}"	18 September 2009
A young couple is found murdered on a deserted road.
585	"Dandiya Murder"	25 September 2009
It is Navratri season, and Aditya and his girlfriend Nisha are playing Dandiya when someone suddenly shoots Aditya amidst the large crowd.
586	"The Case of the Little Witness"	2 October 2009
CID this time has a witness to a murder, who was close enough to see everything and brave enough to not run away.
587	"The Secret of the Skeleton"	9 October 2009
An affluent family is celebrating the birthday of one of their own. The family gets the shock of their lives when a human skeleton comes out of one of the gifts.
588	"Happy Diwali ^{*}"	16 October 2009
People at the party light up some crackers but when the smoke settles, a dead body is found lying on the ground.
589	"Teleshopping Murder"	23 October 2009
An arrogant star gets ready to give his shot in a teleshopping program but right then a spot light falls and misses him by inches. Fortunately, he survives but at the same time the show director dies who was at the control room at that time.
590	"Dance School Mass Murder"	30 October 2009
A watchman does not return. The woman gets worried and goes outside to what had happened to the watchman, but to her surprise, she sees him dead.
591	"Kidnap ^{*}"	6 November 2009
A nurse finds a dead body and immediately calls the CID.
592	"Run Away ^{†}"	13 November 2009
A woman gets killed in her own house. Husband Ajay says that he had been robbed the same day.
593	"The Secret of the Missing Kidney"	20 November 2009
A man named Ravi jumps from a terrace and commits suicide.
594	"Child Labor"	27 November 2009
The dead body of a maid named Prabha is found in the garden of the house where she works.
595	"The Secret of the Nameless Head"	4 December 2009
A middle-aged woman named Damini secretly runs a massive identity theft and fraud racket.
596	"Killer News"	11 December 2009
A businessman named Hiten finds a newspaper clipping in his car predicting the death of his wife and daughter.
597	"Voices"	18 December 2009
A woman is found murdered in a crowded mall, when her body suddenly fall off the upper balcony of the building.
598	"Dead Killer"	25 December 2009
An actress gets threatened by her ex-lover while she shooting a film. Her ex is thrown off of the set by her body guards. The lover strangls her to death.

^{*} Denotes extended 2 hour episode
^{†} Denotes crossover with Aahat
