= List of CID episodes: 2024–present =

The following is a list of episodes from the series CID that started airing from 2024.

== 2024 ==
No. overall	No. in season	Title	Original release date
1548	1	"Sniper Rifle Murderer"	21 December 2024
During a critical rescue operation Abhijeet's daughter Shreya dies due to a minor mistake made by Daya. Abhijeet shoots Daya and the former is sent to jail. A few months later a murder takes place in a metro and the CID team comes to investigate it.
1549	2	"A Mid-Air Murder"	22 December 2024
During a flight, an anonymous caller threatens Abhijeet to fulfill his demands otherwise there will be serious consequences.
1550	3	"Body In The Red Suitcase"	28 December 2024
During a journey from Nagpur to Mumbai,Richa's husband Alok, vanishes under mysterious circumstances.
1551	4	"Chehre Par Chehra"	29 December 2024
CID officer Avni is investigating a case of her injured friend Amisha, uncovering a tangled web of deception, identity twists.

== 2025 ==
No. overall	No. in season	Title	Original release date
1552	5	"Murder On The Island"	4 January 2025
Three charred bodies are discovered in a bungalow on a secluded island by the catering staff.
1553	6	"Salunkhe's Catwalk"	5 January 2025
The CID team investigates the mysterious death of Digvijay, an NRI groom, at his wedding.
1554	7	"Grehani"	11 January 2025
Vishal is a tech genius, whose AI, Grehani, leads to his mysterious death.
1555	8	"Bank Robbery"	12 January 2025
A bank robbery in Mumbai leaves manager Rahul as the sole victim of a planned attack.
1556	9	"Twelfth Victim"	18 January 2025
A young man, Vasu, is jailed for his girlfriend Jhanvi’s murder, but years later, a serial criminal confesses.
1557	10	"Jungle"	19 January 2025
A foreign photographer’s mysterious crime in a forest sparks an investigation which uncovers illegal activities and local rituals.
1558	11	"Gumnaam Hai Koi"	25 January 2025
Tragedy strikes when a dancer suddenly collapses and dies while performing a hula hoop routine on stage.
1559	12	"Ready To Eat"	26 January 2025
Fingers are found in sausage packets. Tracing the source to a factory, CID uncovers a smuggling ring using victims to transport diamonds to Dubai.
1560	13	"Charcoal"	1 February 2025
A corporate party turns deadly when a mysterious poison causes multiple deaths.
1561	14	"Katputli Ka Khel"	2 February 2025
CID investigates a dancer's murder, uncovering a series of killings tied to an artistic pattern and a dark past.
1562	15	"Killer Route"	8 February 2025
A series of crimes targeting bus conductors on a specific route every Sunday baffles CID, as victims are found beheaded with no evidence.
1563	16	"The Last Fight"	9 February 2025
There is the sudden death of a famous underground fighter, Vikram, in the ring. His girlfriend, sensing the situation, calls CID.
1564	17	"Flat No 403"	15 February 2025
A gunshot echoes through a society, leading CID to Vikrant's flat, where they find stains and a skull on the wall.Neena also comes in CID Bureau.
1565	18	"Mechanical Trap"	16 February 2025
A deadly threat frames CID, putting Daya under suspicion. As the team investigates, they uncover the real mastermind behind the setup.
1566	19	"Haunted House (Note: This episode is titled 'Haunted House' on Sony LIV and 'Goat Monster' on Netflix. The Sony LIV title is used here as it comes from the official distributor of the show.)"	22 February 2025
Rajveer and his friends find bloodstains in an abandoned bungalow and notify the CID team.
1567	20	"Murder In The House (Note: This episode is titled 'Murder In The House' on Sony LIV and 'Shrap' on Netflix. The Sony LIV title is used here as it comes from the official distributor of the show.)"	23 February 2025
A woman was found dead in her home when a chandelier mysteriously fell on her.
1568	21	"Gilheri Rakshas"	1 March 2025
A dead body is found in a forest and the locals suspect the Gilheri Rakshas. Inspector Sachin joins CID again by transfer from the Narcotics Department.
1569	22	"Death Of A Therapist"	2 March 2025
A doctor is found dead in her clinic. As CID investigates, their search leads to the Softech Solutions Company.
1570	23	"Not Guilty"	8 March 2025
Akshita seeks refuge with Dr.Salunkhe after an accident on a jungle road.
1571	24	"Curse Of The Burning Man"	9 March 2025
A dead body is found with burning footprints leading away. CID's investigation uncovers a deadly plot relating to an old shipyard legend.
1572	25	"Swimmers"	15 March 2025
A state-level swimmer is found dead in the bathroom.
1573	26	"Room No 804"	16 March 2025
A man claims that the eighth floor at Forest Woodland Resort has inexplicably disappeared.
1574	27	"Baby Steps"	22 March 2025
Yoga instructors Rohini and Puja are found killed similarly.
1575	28	"The Talking Skeleton"	23 March 2025
A restaurant staff member's death leads to a smuggling operation.
1576	29	"Men's Premier League"	29 March 2025
A biker throws a bag on CID's car, which contains evidence against a cricket match-fixing syndicate.
1577	30	"Nakabposh"	30 March 2025
A man claims to have a vision of a woman being murdered, and later the prediction comes true.
1578	31	"The End Of The Watch"	5 April 2025
Barboza of the Golden Eye Gang sets up a bomb and hijacks the CID Bureau.
1579	32	"The Aftermath"	6 April 2025
The CID team, suffering from the loss of ACP Pradyuman, prepare to take down Barboza and the Golden Eye Gang.
1580	33	"Ticket To Heaven"	12 April 2025
Rajeev is found dead on a bus, with his face turned red and signs of rigor mortis.
1581	34	"Purze"	13 April 2025
With ACP Ayushmaan as the new ACP, the team investigates cases of organ harvesting murders.
1582	35	"Murder At The Studio"	19 April 2025
Podcaster Aniket, who recently solved a two-year-old murder case, is found dead.
1583	36	"Murder At The Railway Tracks"	20 April 2025
The investigation of a dead girl near the Mahim railway tracks leads to a possible link to Barboza.
1584	37	"Death In The Car"	26 April 2025
During the launch of a new car, a body is found in it. While patrolling at night, Abhijeet and Sachin meet Rajan Aulakh and Vikram Patel of Jewel Thief.
1585	38	"The Silent Den"	27 April 2025
A murder takes place in an escape room, and the team has to investigate it without any verbal communication. Flashback scenes also reveal a face-off between ACP Pradyuman and ACP Ayushman.
1586	39	"CID Mein Gaddar"	3 May 2025
CID arrives at a school under threat of a bomb. Meanwhile, Abhijeet investigates a different murder and kidnapping case. Flashbacks continue with Ayushmaan informing ACP Pradyuman about a possible mole in the team.
1587	40	"Accidental Death Or A Planned Murder?"	4 May 2025
Two contestants of a reality show die during filming. While investigating it, another hit-and-run occurs.
1588	41	"The Last Stroke"	10 May 2025
A painter is found dead in his gallery. Sometime later, a news anchor also dies.
1589	42	"Missing Flight"	11 May 2025
A body tied to a seat is discovered in a lake, and divers uncover pieces of a plane that vanished eight years back in 2017.
1590	43	"The Mysterious Death Of A Businessman"	17 May 2025
A businessman is found dead in his pool. During the investigation, another murder happens.
1591	44	"Skeleton At A Construction Site"	18 May 2025
A skeleton is found buried in a construction site. Investigation leads to more skeletons being found.
1592	45	"Case Of Real Diamonds"	24 May 2025
Two men are killed on the same night, with a broken diamond-studded vase present at both crime scenes.
1593	46	"The Last Call"	25 May 2025
Secret chips installed in phones cause explosions all over the city when triggered by an unknown number.
1594	47	"Jewellery Theft"	31 May 2025
Daya's badge being found in a godown with stolen jewellery puts him under suspicion. A doppelganger of ACP Pradyuman attacks Daya in a tent.
1595	48	"ACP Pradyuman Is Alive?"	1 June 2025
Daya tells the CID team that ACP Pradyuman is still alive but doesn't recognize him and is now a part of the Golden Eye Gang. Umpire Anil Choudhary also appears as a member of the Golden Eye Gang.
1596	49	"ACP Pradyuman Tricks CID"	7 June 2025
ACP Pradyuman returns to CID, but Abhijeet refuses to believe he is the real ACP. ACP Pradyuman then reveals how he survived the bomb blast and also saved Inspector Shreya and her daughter from the Golden Eye Gang.
1597	50	"Accident Or Murder?"	8 June 2025
Dr. Salunkhe is declared a traitor and arrested. ACP Ayushmaan leaves CID since ACP Pradyuman has returned. The CID team then has to investigate the death of a driver in a car accident, but finds out that he was dead before the impact.
1598	51	"Behind The Glamour"	14 June 2025
Ira, an actress, is found hanging in her house. Investigation leads to multiple suspects with motives.
1599	52	"Death In The Jungle"	15 June 2025
While trekking, four friends find a headless body in the jungle without any blood. Dr. Tarika joins CID once again.
1600	53	"Dead Men In Uniform"	21 June 2025
A policeman is pushed from an apartment by someone who looks like Daya. Two more police officers were murdered later.
1601	54	"Janamdin Par Maut"	22 June 2025
Salil is killed as soon as he enters his house for his birthday party.
1602	55	"Omkar Sawant Joins The Team"	28 June 2025
Daya shoots Inspector Milan on a moving bus. Superintendent Omkar Sawant is sent to help CID.
1603	56	"Omkar Sawant Has A Breakthrough"	29 June 2025
SOS announces that Daya is the main suspect in the killing of the police officers. Meanwhile, CID has to investigate a triple murder case.
1604	57	"Officer Daya Is On The Run"	5 July 2025
Officer Daya disguises himself and boards a flight. The same flight happens to get hijacked.
1605	58	"An Encrypted Message (Note: This episode is titled 'An Encrypted Message' on Sony LIV and 'Inspector Daya's Secret Code' on Netflix. The Sony LIV title is used here as it comes from the official distributor of the show.)"	6 July 2025
CID discovers that Daya has escaped in disguise. While Daya takes Shreya's help once he lands in Delhi, some members of CID decrypt his secret message left behind.
1606	59	"Purvi Receives A Message"	12 July 2025
As the team prepares to surround the governor's residence, Purvi receives an encrypted message from Daya.
1607	60	"Double Agent Daya"	13 July 2025
Omkar Sawant exposes Daya's secret, but Abhijeet has a revelation of his own. Purvi and Abhijeet attempt a daring rescue mission.
1608	61	"Team CID On A Vacation"	19 July 2025
The team attempts to take a vacation, but their resort paradise soon turns into a grisly crime scene when a comedian's manager is killed.
1609	62	"Officer Purvi's Narrow Escape"	20 July 2025
After Purvi narrowly escapes a dangerous acid attack, the CID aggressively pursues a list of suspects.
1610	63	"Ekk Anokha Case"	26 July 2025
When a cryptic note is found on the body of a disgraced CEO, cops realize that they only have 72 hours to stop a murder from taking place.ACP Pradyuman asks Dr Salunkhe for help.
1611	64	"Dr Salunkhe Goes Missing"	27 July 2025
With only 42 hours remaining, the CID searches for the missing Salunkhe.
1612	65	"CID Ke Naam Ek Gift"	2 August 2025
When ACP Pradyuman receives a call from a mysterious figure known as "the Chessmaster " the team finds itself caught in a dangerous game.
1613	66	"Ekk Insaan,Do Maut"	3 August 2025
The discovery of a body draws the CID into a curious case when they learn that the victim has died twice.
1614	67	"Accident Ya Murder?"	9 August 2025
A bike accident takes a shocking turn when the autopsy reveals hidden truths.
1615	68	"Officer Abhijeet Witnesses A Crime"	10 August 2025
While recovering at home from an injury, Officer Abhijeet believes that he has witnessed a crime taking place in the apartment opposite his house.
1616	69	"Failed Transactions"	16 August 2025
When multiple payment transactions fail across the city, the team discovers a link to an accident involving a doctor set to receive an award.
1617	70	"Shraap"	17 August 2025
CID investigates in a chawl where young Prasad dies during Dahi Handi practice.
1618	71	"Dead Principal"	23 August 2025
After a principal's death, the team finds red powder under his nails and scratches on his neck.
1619	72	"Do Minute, Do Khoon"	24 August 2025
As a major art exhibit opens, two persons are found dead.
1620	73	"Manch Par Maut"	30 August 2025
Amid Ganpati celebrations, the CID team is called in to investigate the mysterious death of a famous dance teacher.
1621	74	"The Headless Dead Body"	31 August 2025
Team CID investigates the case of a headless dead body found in a trunk on top of a bus.
1622	75	"An Author's Murder Mystery"	6 September 2025
While Team CID is busy playing a game of chess, they receive news of the murder of renowned novelist Surya.
1623	76	"A Serial Killer's Revenge"	7 September 2025
Chaos erupts when a prisoner breaks free, determined to hunt those behind his arrest.
1624	77	"Shooting Stars"	13 September 2025
Arpan mysteriously dies moments after proposing to his girlfriend through a video under a shooting star.
1625	78	"High Security Murder"	14 September 2025
When Abhijeet learns that his friend Dhanraaj may be in danger, he rushes to find him.
1626	79	"Haunted Amusement Park (Note: This episode is titled 'Haunted Amusement Park' on Sony LIV and 'The Missing Influencer' on Netflix. The Sony LIV title is used here as it comes from the official distributor of the show.)"	20 September 2025
A social media experiment to revive an abandoned amusement park turns sinister when an influencer dies mid-stunt.
1627	80	"Bureau Mein Murder (Note: This episode is titled 'Bureau Mein Murder' on Sony LIV and 'Attack On Mumbai' on Netflix. The Sony LIV title is used here as it comes from the official distributor of the show.)"	21 September 2025
A man reports a threat to his life and an impending attack in Mumbai. Before he can say more, he collapses and dies.
1628	81	"Influencer Ki Maut (Note: This episode is titled 'Influencer Ki Maut' on Sony LIV and 'Death During A Live Stream' on Netflix. The Sony LIV title is used here as it comes from the official distributor of the show.)"	27 September 2025
On being called by Shanaya's concerned manager, team CID smashes Shanaya's door and finds her murdered.
1629	82	"Pariyon Ki Duniya"	28 September 2025
CID takes on a baffling case where people act possessed, speak of a fairyland, and then die by suicide.
1630	83	"A Poisoned Necklace"	4 October 2025
Shreya arrives to attend the engagement ceremony of Rashi and Aman. Soon after, Rashi is found murdered.
1631	84	"Curious Case Of Artificial Intelligence"	5 October 2025
Cricketer Neerav's daughter is kidnapped from school, and CID steps in to investigate.
1632	85	"Murder At The Resort"	11 October 2025
Team CID reaches a resort to investigate the mysterious death of a young girl who was stabbed.
1633	86	"Deadly Overtime"	12 October 2025
When a woman working late at her office is found dead,investigation uncovers mysterious CCTV footage and unusual wounds on the body.
1634	87	"Bungalow Mein Maut"	18 October 2025
When a man named Kunal is found dead, investigators face a twist when they learn that he reported his own death before it happened.
1635	88	"An Obsessed Fan"	19 October 2025
A fatal stabbing occurs in an actor's green room.
1636	89	"RJ Ki Maut"	25 October 2025
Pankaj is on a call with RJ Rishabh when suddenly, the RJ calls out for help and is then found murdered.
1637	90	"Karmo Ka Phal"	26 October 2025
A man is found dead with his face crushed by a stone and a message scrawled in his blood at an isolated spot.
1638	91	"Death Of A Fortune Teller"	1 November 2025
A crowd gathers to hear messages from their ancestors through a woman, but suddenly the woman dies right before their eyes.
1639	92	"Buried In Cement"	2 November 2025
A body is discovered buried in cement inside an abandoned bungalow.
1640	93	"Cursed Mirror"	8 November 2025
An actress is found unconscious after a mysterious accident that appears to be deliberate.
1641	94	"Death After Discharge (Note: This episode is titled 'Death After Discharge' on Sony LIV and 'Industrialist Ki Maut' on Netflix. The Sony LIV title is used here as it comes from the official distributor of the show.)"	9 November 2025
Dhiren, a businessman, is found dead in his car after being discharged from the hospital.
1642	95	"Maut Ki Dhamki"	15 November 2025
Businessman Kuldeep receives a threatening phone call over a bungalow dispute and is later found dead in his meditation room.
1643	96	"Apsara"	16 November 2025
While team CID heads out for a picnic, they stumble upon a case involving a missing policeman. The prime suspect is a woman who lives by the lake.
1644	97	"Ekk Anokha Shadyantra"	22 November 2025
Team CID investigates a case where they find a woman's body without the head.
1645	98	"A Chain Of Murders"	23 November 2025
The CID team stumbles upon a strange case where an auto-rickshaw driver is found strangled to death with no signs of struggle and no witnesses.
1646	99	"SOS Call"	29 November 2025
Team CID follows a set of coordinates to a secluded location after receiving an SOS call.
1647	100	"Rakshak Baba"	30 November 2025
Three friends trespass onto land owned by Rakshak Baba. One escapes, but the other two are found decapitated and their bodies discovered deeper in the forest.
1648	101	"The Ghost Of Kalighati Village"	6 December 2025
While Daya is on vacation he stumbles on a case where villagers are being killed, apparently by a witch whose legend goes back years.
1649	102	"Murder At The Bureau (Note: This episode is titled 'Murder At The Bureau' on Sony LIV and 'Abhijeet Under Suspicion' on Netflix. The Sony LIV title is used here as it comes from the official distributor of the show.)"	7 December 2025
Makrand, a gruesome serial killer, is found dead while in the custody of CID.
1650	103	"Abhijeet’s Secret Caller"	13 December 2025
A truck driver is found dead and his partner is missing. CID is stunned to discover that the RDX once loaded in the truck has vanished.
1651	104	"Abhijeet Shoots Daya"	14 December 2025
With Abhijeet suspected of having gone rogue, team CID attempts to track 400 kg of RDX across the city.
