= V. A. Dilshad =

Indian cinematographer (1966–2021)

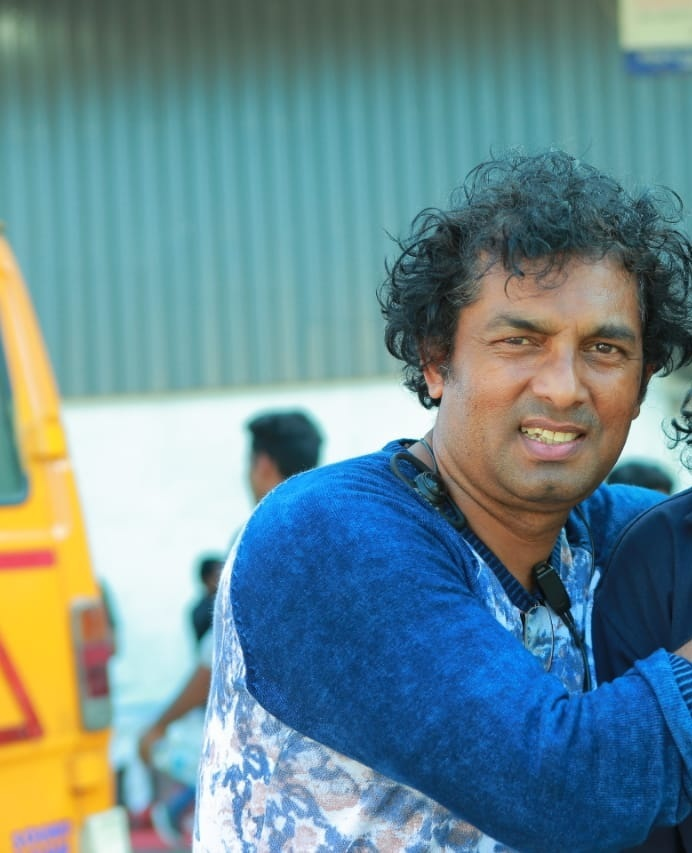
- V.A.Dilshad at Escape from Black Water location
- Born: 1 November 1966; Ernakulam, Kerala, India
- Died: 27 May 2021 (aged 54); Mumbai, Maharashtra, India
- Other name: Pippy
- Occupation: Cinematographer
- Spouse: Babitha Dilshad

V. A. Dilshad (known in industry circles as Pippy) was an Indian cinematographer who worked in Hindi cinema, Malayalam, Kannada, Marathi and English-language films.

On 27 May 2021, Dilshad died in Mumbai after being hospitalised, over a month for COVID-19.

== Career ==
Dilshad started his career as an assistant and associate cameraman to Ramachandra Babu for more than 40 films. Later he joined with Ravi Yadav as second operative cameraman for various Bollywood films directed by Abbas–Mustan like Race 2, Players, Race, Naqaab and Aitraaz.

His Hindi debut, The Waiting Room directed by Maneej Premnath, was reviewed as "master cinematography that captures the mood almost perfectly". He also completed the Marathi film Antar produced by actor Akshay Kumar and the English film The Black Russian, which won the Best Cinematography award at the 2014 Action on Film Festival.

Dilshad cranked the camera for Kapil Sharma's debut Kis Kisko Pyaar Karoon and Machine starring newcomer Mustafa Burmawalla and Kiara Advani, both films directed by Abbas–Mustan Dilshad has also completed two films; Escape from Black Water (English) and Fatwa (Marathi), that will have a theatrical release in 2022.

== Filmography ==
Year	Film	Industry	Director	Notes
2022	Escape from Black Water	English	Roger Ellis Frazier	upcoming
2017	Fatwa	Marathi	Pratik Gautam	upcoming
2017	Machine	Hindi	Abbas–Mustan	
2014	Kis Kisko Pyaar Karoon	Hindi	Abbas–Mustan	
2014	Antar	Marathi	Gawri Sarwat	
2014	The Black Russian	English	Carlos Valle	
2013	Thodi Si Zindagi	Hindi	Neeraj Sharma	
2011	Manushyamrugam	Malayalam	Baburaj	
2010	The Waiting Room	Hindi	Maneej Premnath	
2002	Ee Bhargavi Nilayam	Malayalam	Benny P.Thomas	
2002	Madhuram	Malayalam	Bharath	
2001	Fort Kochi	Malayalam	Benny P.Thomas	
2000	Kaathara	Malayalam	Prem	

=== Additional credits ===
Dilshad has worked in several films as an assistant, associate cameraman and later as 2nd Operative Cameraman.

Year	Film	Industry	Director	Role
2013	Phata Poster Nikhla Hero	Hindi	Rajkumar Santoshi	2nd Operative Cameraman
2013	Race 2	Hindi	Abbas–Mustan	2nd Operative Cameraman
2012	Players	Hindi	Abbas–Mustan	2nd Operative Cameraman
2008	Race	Hindi	Abbas–Mustan	2nd Operative Cameraman
2007	Naqaab	Hindi	Abbas–Mustan	2nd Operative Cameraman
2006	36 China Town	Hindi	Abbas–Mustan	2nd Operative Cameraman
2005	Socha Na Tha	Hindi	Imtiaz Ali	2nd Operative Cameraman
2004	Aitraaz	Hindi	Abbas–Mustan	2nd Operative Cameraman
2004	Taarzan: The Wonder Car	Hindi	Abbas–Mustan	2nd Operative Cameraman
2000	Manava 2002	Kannada	Thakkali Srinivasan	Associate Cameraman
