= List of CID episodes: 2015–2018 =

The following is a list of episodes from the series CID aired from 2015 to 2018.

For episodes aired from 1998 to 2009, see the List of CID episodes: 1998–2009.

For episodes aired from 2010 to 2014, see the List of CID episodes: 2010–2014.

== 2015 ==
Episode	Title	Original release date
1172	"Nakul Returns"	2 January 2015
The city is under a terrorist attack as reported by Interpol and there is chaos in the CID bureau. The prime suspect is ACP's son Nakul.
1173	"Nakul Returns II"	3 January 2015
There are tense faces at the CID Head Quarters.
1174	"Happy New Year"	4 January 2015
Ambika a 22-year-old middle-class girl is embroiled in a drug deal and after escaping crossfire, she is murdered in a storehouse.
1175	"Murder in Lift"	9 January 2015
A tarot card reader prophesizes to Rajeev, that he should avoid water as it can be fatal for him! Meanwhile he decides to sell his company - a move that is opposed by the trade union.
1176	"Murder in Auto"	10 January 2015
A man’s daughter is trying to find her father’s killer with the help of a young man when they become witnesses to a crime.
1177	"3 Bullet"	11 January 2015
Ronny, a college student, needs money to complete his studies. He is duped by a mysterious woman and is made into a human bomb intended to blow up a celebrity, Ajit Kumar.
1178	"Ghost Guest"	16 January 2015
A strange woman enters a house and is about to attack a child with a knife when his parents, Anand and Krutika, stop her.
1179	"Ghost in the Theater"	17 January 2015
A newly renovated theatre is haunted by a female ghost who claims to be the owner of the theatre and kills people coming into the theatre.
1180	"Haunted Mansion"	18 January 2015
A family goes to a resort for a holiday but soon find that they have been trapped, and are being haunted by a supernatural spirit.
1181	"Crisis of CID"	23 January 2015
CID find a mysterious bottle in the sea which contains a note asking for help.
1182	"Crisis of CID II"	24 January 2015
CID investigate the area and find that certain marine engineers had disappeared mysteriously near it and were never heard from again.
1183	"Crisis of CID III"	25 January 2015
A group of hitchhikers are climbing a volcanic mountain as one of their friends has gone amiss while trekking a week ago.
1184	"Enemies of the Country"	26 January 2015
A bus full of school students travelling to a Republic Day function disappears en route.
1185	"Daya in Danger"	30 January 2015
Daya tries to help a poor, eight-year-old rag picker with an ill mother, but becomes enmeshed in a fake currency scam.
1186	"Milli and Tina at Risk"	31 January 2015
Milly, a young girl who is recovering from the loss of her brother, Bunty, informs her parents that her friend in the opposite building is being tortured by someone in the house where she is staying.
1187	"White Mask"	1 February 2015
An NRI couple has moved back to India with hopes of re-opening an orphanage. Their young son, Rahul makes friends with four kids, who the mother learns nobody has seen before in their neighbourhood.
1188	"Shera's Friendship"	6 February 2015
A child goes missing from a housing society located near a forest.
1189	"Shark Attack"	7 February 2015
A couple start a ‘shark tourism’ business, inviting adventure-lovers to experience the thrill of watching a shark underwater while locked in a secure cage.
1190	"Varun Dhawan in Danger"	13 February 2015
Several reports start coming in of a half-human, half-bear creature attacking people in Mumbai. Varun Dhawan, while promoting his movie, Badlapur, is attacked by the creature.
1191	"Varun Dhawan in Danger II"	14 February 2015
Varun finds that he has been taken by this bear-creature to a place guarder by goons.
1192	"Murder in Fashion Show"	15 February 2015
A glamorous fashion show, with the theme ‘water, fire, and ice’ is taking place, when a model goes missing.
1193	"Magical Somersault"	20 February 2015
A group of mysterious magicians arrive in strange and colourful disguises at to a posh party, where they do a body-floating magic trick on a guest by the name of Pritam.
1194	"Magician in Danger"	21 February 2015
A famous child magician goes missing during his magic act, and instead of him; dead body of his father appears onstage.
1195	"Innocent at Risk"	22 February 2015
A strange woman breaks into a house, and is about to attack a small child with a knife when his parents- Anand and Krutika manage to stop her.
1196	"Mask"	27 February 2015
Vishal and his friend Mayank witness from afar, a woman wearing white sari committing suicide.
1197	"The Secret of the Impersonator"	28 February 2015
CID are after a man who seems to be able to appear in multiple places at the same time. They soon realise, that this man might in fact be two twins named Arjun and Girish.
1198	"Missing Magician"	1 March 2015
The city is abuzz with the much anticipated magic show of the magician AK. But when AK does not reappear as a part of a trick, his manager checks the trunk where he was supposed to be hiding- and finds AK’s dead body tumbling inside it.
1199	"Prithviraj Chavan's secret"	6 March 2015
A play based upon Prithviraj Chauhan helmed by famous director Manish is to be staged, when it receives threatening letters from someone.
1200	"Dance CID Dance"	7 March 2015
Three dancers Mohini, Gaurav, and Samrat are invited to participate in a private dance competition. Soon Mohini's assistant Ira and Gaurav went missing.
1201	"CID Vs Super Villain"	8 March 2015
An animator sells his studio in order to generate funds for his ambitious video game project and is fooled by NK Sandhu, the buyer.
1202	"CID in Danger"	13 March 2015
Abhijeet is called from an unknown number informing that Daya's life is in danger.
1203	"Invisible Human"	14 March 2015
Some children racing against each other are overtaken by a random person.
1204	"Killer Glasses"	15 March 2015
A birthday party turns horrid when the father of the birthday girl loses self-control and shoots a colleague.
1205	"Dangerous Bikers"	20 March 2015
A group of stuntmen led by the star biker Golendo are upto some mischief.
1206	"Dangerous Bikers II"	21 March 2015
The cops pursue some bikers, trying to crack the criminal bikers and their mystery plan. However, Golendo and gang manage to hoodwink the cops and they commit a robbery at a government gold reserve.
1207	"Killer Jungle"	22 March 2015
A huge family is having a lunch party in their garden at their home. During lunch, as everyone is eating and talking, a blood-drained human arm falls onto the table.
1208	"CID's Run"	27 March 2015
As the team is deciding on a small holiday, a young child smeared in the blood is seen outside the office.
1209	"Ali's Chaos"	28 March 2015
Ali Asgar a famous actor sees a dead groom all dressed up and ready in his car back seat. Conflict ensues when the dead groom is shown to be Abhijeet.
1210	"Ali's Chaos II"	29 March 2015
With the team worried about Abhijeet, Ali Asgar is brought in for interrogation.
1211	"Byomkesh Bakshy's Search"	3 April 2015
The story centers on two cases–one is set in Mumbai and the other is set in a town of Bengal.
1212	"DCP Chitrole's Marriage"	5 April 2015
The CID team is in the process of transferring a big criminal from Mumbai to Delhi. But the cops become embroiled in a murder controversy where they are unable to save the victim who called them for help.
1213	"Call Center Murder"	10 April 2015
All employees in the call center celebrate an employee's birthday. In the middle of the cake-cutting ceremony the birthday girl's ex-boyfriend Dev arrives and spoils her mood.
1214	"4 Corpses's secret"	11 April 2015
A wealthy man brings a NRI group to show his farmhouse with the intention of selling it. When they enter the house, they are shocked to see a woman lying on the floor.
1215	"Golden Eye Gang"	12 April 2015
Four friends named Dev, Rudra, Vivan and Suhana worked for the Golden-eye gang which was headed by gangster Jacky.
1216	"Emraan Hashmi As Mr. X"	17 April 2015
Marco is an illusion artist who is obsessed with the idea of showing and proving TELEPORTATION was a fact.
1217	"Murder in Plane"	18 April 2015
Pilot Vidhi breaks into the airline office and steals mysterious information from the safe. Hours later as she is flying, her co-pilot takes a drinks break and leaves the cockpit.
1218	"Corpse in Statue"	19 April 2015
Residents of a colony learn that there is a dead body in the statue.
1219	"CID's Flight"	24 April 2015
A man decides to go and pay ransom for his daughter and but is killed in the process.
1220	"Secret of Box"	25 April 2015
CID investigates a double murder.
1221	"Super Thief"	26 April 2015
Three master thieves name Akshit, Karishma and Baala rob 50 crores from the reserve bank and hide the money.
1222	"CID in Train"	1 May 2015
During a gang shootout, a goon survives and escapes as something explodes.
1223	"CID in Train II"	2 May 2015
A drug deal on the train journey from Mumbai to Goa. But they do not know who the criminals are and where and when the drugs would be exchanged.
1224	"Telekinesis"	3 May 2015
Amyra has a fight with one of her colleagues Meera when a chandelier almost falls on her.
1225	"CID in Satara"	8 May 2015
Deepika informs the bureau that her husband has been kidnapped.
1226	"Daya in Mansion"	9 May 2015
Daya is sure that the workers of the haveli are on a hunt for someone outside. His fears prove true when the murder of a young woman happens in the town.
1227	"CID in Mahabaleshwar"	10 May 2015
CID finds the dead body of a contract killer named Jaggi with three photographs and a red cross on their face.
1228	"Lootera Monkey Man"	15 May 2015
A man named Ankush needs money for his son Laksh's operation and decides to rob a bank using the advantage of a rumour about a monkey man.
1229	"Red Hat Secret"	16 May 2015
Famous model Ishani is found dead in her makeup room and a girl named Samaira goes missing.
1230	"The Wrapped-Up Corpse"	17 May 2015
Dinesh's newly constructed building is haunted by a mummy and investors threaten him that they will withdraw his money.
1231	"Scary Zulaaki"	22 May 2015
A school organises a summer camp in the woods of Kaanjim which is haunted by a man named Zulaaki. Before they could move out of the woods, the parents are murdered by Zulaaki and kids have been taken away.
1232	"Creepy Fair"	23 May 2015
10-year-old Anushka goes mysteriously missing from an amusement park, her guardian Mr Vishesh is found dead in the swimming pool of the child’s mansion.
1233	"Conspiracy Mystery"	24 May 2015
A family is out for camping when the kid hears the sound of an injured. He goes out to check and the next day the kid is missing.
1234	"Drawing Mystery"	29 May 2015
At an engagement part of Ashok, an unknown man gatecrashes the party and let's killed.
1235	"Brave Danny"	30 May 2015
A car loses its control as it plunges into the lake.
1236	"Innocent at Risk"	31 May 2015
Monty is coming back from school when he witnesses his friend Annie being kidnapped and taken away in a van.
1237	"Death Trap"	5 June 2015
Sanjana disappears mysteriously and the last person in her contact was her boss.
1238	"Death Trap II"	6 June 2015
Salunke performs an emergency procedure on Daya and manages to save his life after the building collapsed. The cops including Abhijit, Daya, Sachin and Purvi have suffered various injuries but insist on staying in the field.
1239	"Death Trap III"	7 June 2015
Sanjana has managed to escape but her brother has been captured and she is asked to hand over a mysterious briefcase because of which she was kidnapped.
1240	"Death Rain"	12 June 2015
Business Tycoons and Builders want a controversial bungalow called Preet Nagar Colony empty.
1241	"Mishap in the Air"	13 June 2015
A girl named Sonia is paragliding from a cliff when she sees a murder happening on the ground.
1242	"Yellow Hat Secret"	14 June 2015
A gruesome murder occurs in a crowded picnic spot, shaking up the investigation process.
1243	"Dowry Trap"	19 June 2015
A girl goes to a construction building in an auto-rickshaw and is stabbed while talking on the phone.
1244	"Murder in the Mall"	20 June 2015
A man Manit has a pacemaker in his heart. As he goes in the mall passing through the scanner a gunshot is heard and he dies.
1245	"Killer Jungle"	26 June 2015
Two rookie interns of CID land at CID bureau, following the cops and making their video footage. When they are caught, they reveal that DCP Chitrole was trekking in a jungle before going missing. When the CID reach there, they nab a poacher and retrieve a video camera that films the murder of two college students.
1246	"Trap of CCTV"	27 June 2015
In a grand luxurious multistory, someone spying on a man though CCTV cameras that have been secretly installed in the apartment and then he is murdered.
1247	"Abhijeet Trapped"	3 July 2015
Inspector Abhijeet receives a message wrapped in stone through the window. The message has a photograph of a girl asking for help and Abhijit sets out to rescue her at a resort where he is trapped.
1248	"Hotel Decent"	4 July 2015
Daya's car breaks down in the middle of the road and he decides to take shelter in a motel which has seven people staying there. He hears a distant scream and finds a body in one of the rooms.
1249	"ACP in Hospital"	5 July 2015
ACP Pradyuman is admitted for a minor operation and the attending nurse Gayatri disappears.
1250	"Rift in CID"	10 July 2015
A robbery has taken place in a jewelry shop and a man has been found dead.
1251	"Rift in CID II"	11 July 2015
In the second part we see that the girl, Priya, who shot DCP is caught and she confesses to stealing the diamonds.
1252	"Living Corpse"	12 July 2015
One night, few criminals were killing one person.A man heard their conversation and escaped.
1253	"Child Kidnapper"	17 July 2015
Malhaar, who sells candies to children is murdered under mysterious conditions.
1254	"Secret of Mobile Chip"	18 July 2015
A young boy discovers that his principal in his college was taking bribes and he decided to bring to people's attention his principal's truth.
1255	"Creepy Crime"	19 July 2015
A 25-year-old woman named Rekha finds her father murdered while she is away on a work trip.
1256	"CID in Delhi"	24 July 2015
A couple, Sonali and Kundan, are attacked in the Haus Khas part of Delhi by goons. Kundan is killed but Sonali survives. Meanwhile, Sonali's twin sister, Monica, who is traveling in a train, towards Mumbai, is killed by another girl who drugs the passengers.
1257	"CID in Agra"	25 July 2015
The team is informed that a contract killer called Keshav, living in Agra, has a new target, but they don't know who the target is.
1258	"CID in Mathura"	26 July 2015
CID receives a cry of help from a kid who informs them that his parents Ajay and Natasha had gone missing in Mathura and that they could be in trouble.
1259	"Corpse in the Car"	31 July 2015
Episode begins with a taxi driver who finds that a female passenger has left her bag behind, and he decides to keep it instead. When he opens the bag, he finds a dismembered body in it.
1260	"Ragging in Hostel"	1 August 2015
A young boy dressed in a woman's clothes falls from his college terrace.
1261	"Daya and Abhijeet's Friendship"	2 August 2015
Three people, who earlier partied at a club are found dead and tied down in a jute sack. Conflict ensues in CID when the fingerprints and DNA samples of the culprit match with Daya's and Abhijeet refuses to believe this.
1262	"Consequences of Addiction"	7 August 2015
Kishore and Virendra, two friends turned foes, are asked by Reena, Virendra's wife to set aside their differences and join hands. Meanwhile, a boy named Raunak is seen yearning for a newly found drug, Boom Boom but fails to get any drug. Next day, as Kishore and Virendra are returning from Silvasa with the cash Virendra obtained by selling his ancestral home, they encounter a gang of goons, who shoot Virendra and steal the cash.
1263	"Clever Thief"	8 August 2015
CID investigates the most unusual murder case ever. The team finds a man dead inside his house where he lives alone.
1264	"Red Suitcase Secret"	9 August 2015
Raju is carrying a red suitcase in the middle of the night. He is caught by some of his neighbors. They question him and discover that the suitcase has a dead body cut into pieces in it.
1265	"Cut Finger Secret"	14 August 2015
A family shifts into their new home and receives an angry letter and chopped finger.
1266	"War of Independence"	16 August 2015
While driving a young couple notices that a woman is trying to grab their attention. The couple decides to help the woman, but she soon dies saying 'Save her'.
1267	"Bloody Game"	21 August 2015
A group friends take part in their monthly murder mystery game night. During the game one of the contestants turn up dead for real.
1268	"Zehar Ka Kehar"	22 August 2015
A man enters the coffee shop and can be sen asking people for some financial help to save someone's life. He informs them that someone is dying and he needs money to save him.
1269	"Bloody Game in the Jungle"	23 August 2015
Contestants are shooting for a reality TV show on an island where they have to compete with each other by performing various tasks to win a huge cash prize. The case starts when the contestants are killed one by one. On the other hand, a woman, stuck in a jungle of the island, sees a dead body, and is attacked by several arrows.
1270	"The Story of Murder"	28 August 2015
Niharika is a successful actress and an amazing performer. One day, after her show, Niharika is walking towards her green room when suddenly she feels blood trickling down on her.
1271	"The Warning"	29 August 2015
Episode begins with Shweta and Hitesh celebrating their anniversary with a group of friends. Suddenly a girl named Nisha runs towards Shweta and asks her to run away otherwise she will be killed.
1272	"Murder in Closed Room"	30 August 2015
A man can be seen rushing into his office and he closes the door behind him. Just then the staff hears him scream and groan in agony.
1273	"Missing Husband's Secret"	4 September 2015
Two men park their car in front of a house and go inside to meet the owner. The owner of the house turns out to be their friend.
1274	"Pariwar Ke Khoon Ka Rahasya"	5 September 2015
Three people of the same family are murdered, and one can be seen fighting for her life.
1275	"Hawai Jahaz Par Maut Ka Keher"	6 September 2015
Daya is travelling back to India on a long-haul flight. Suddenly he receives a message on his secure phone that if his demands are not met then every half hour one passenger on this flight will die.
1276	"Saazish"	11 September 2015
CID are investigating a case in which a person was mysteriously killed at a play.
1277	"The Secret of Missing Children"	12 September 2015
Rishi is a young boy who does not want to stay with his parents and appeals to CID for help.
1278	"Killer Gym"	13 September 2015
Naman is a trainer in a gym and is popular with its members, but is hated by trainers because he lures away all of their potential clients. Naman is then found dead in a pond and CID investigates the case.
1279	"The Secret of Murder"	18 September 2015
An ex-makeup artist has been disguising himself and robbing weddings in the city, stealing the attendees' belongings.
1280	"Plan Murder"	19 September 2015
On the eve of Ganesh Chaturthi, Monica, along with her foster father, is celebrating this auspicious day. Meanwhile, Guddu pays his friend Rohit, but is forced to leave when Rohit’s mother suddenly arrives.
1281	"Spirit's Shadow"	20 September 2015
Young students are partying at a bungalow celebrating the end of their exams, playing loud music. A man in the neighbouring bungalow is annoyed with the noise and goes over to complain.
1282	"The Bloody Game of Wedding"	25 September 2015
A girl named Meher meets a boy through a matrimonial website and eager to meet him in real life, agrees to meet at a desolated place that he suggests. Soon, her body is found, murdered at that same spot.
1283	"Taaskari"	26 September 2015
A young couple trying to escape their hectic life check into a hotel to spend some time by themselves. But the wife’s father tracks her down for some reason and starts searching hotel rooms to find his daughter.
1284	"Special Entry"	27 September 2015
‘Yeh Ajeeb Zindagi’ is a play that is going to complete 100 shows at the Pride Theatre. The protagonist of the play is Rana, who has now become popular in the industry.
1285	"Dahlia Road"	2 October 2015
Dahlia House is a strange house inhabited by a mysterious family, that stops travellers on road, asking for help with their ill father.
1286	"Half Wedding"	3 October 2015
A young lady suddenly falls off a terrace into a pool during a marriage function in a club. The investigation leads CID to a shocking revelation that she was pushed by someone.
1287	"Impersonating Wife"	4 October 2015
35 year old Karan married for a second time after his first wife Radhika passed away under mysterious circumstances.
1288	"Killer Furniture"	9 October 2015
A customer at an antique furniture showroom decides to buy a strange wooden box to decorate her room. But when she inspects the box with the showroom owner, they find a dead body inside it, cut into two pieces.
1289	"Killer Highway"	11 October 2015
One night, a girl was waiting for taxi.Her boyfriend came and asked her to go with him but the girl refused.
1290	"Innocent"	11 October 2015
An young girl named Kaanchi is named a suspect in the murder of two of her family members.
1291	"Shaatir Kidnapper"	16 October 2015
A woman witnesses the daughter of her neighbours being kidnapped by the girl’s nanny at with an unseen partner.
1292	"Mystery Box"	17 October 2015
A drunkard named Gaurav is told to deliver a box to a particular location in exchange for money- unaware that the box contains a gun.
1293	"Vasai Fort's Mystery"	18 October 2015
A group go camping to an old fort, which has a legend surrounding it about the ghost of a woman reportedly haunting it for centuries.
1294	"Khalnayak"	23 October 2015
A famous actor named Kushal comes across a helpless girl on the side of the road teased by goons.
1295	"Corpse in the Lake"	24 October 2015
CID find a mysterious dead body underwater, which no-one can identify.
1296	"Khooni Waseeyat"	25 October 2015
An old wealthy woman named Mandira invites her extended family for a dinner after 5 years without any contact.
1297	"Double Murder"	30 October 2015
A couple is on a road trip trying to reach their destination when their bike breaks down. They begin taking turns pushing the bike, and start arguing, but suddenly come across two dead bodies.
1298	"Khooni Angrakhshak"	1 November 2015
A masked man is wandering the city behaving strangely, and is randomly killing people. People believe he is the devil.
1299	"Deceive"	6 November 2015
A man was flirting with a girl.Meanwhile, the girl's father came and insulted the man.
1300	"Lift to Death"	7 November 2015
A lift in a residential building is stuck between floors. CID learn that trapped inside the lift are a child and a gravely injured man with a gun.
1301	"Alien Attack"	8 November 2015
Manoj is desperately trying to connect with the people of different planets. He is researching and experimenting on his subject to connect with aliens.
1302	"Rang Mahal"	13 November 2015
A young heir to the humongous bungalow wants to sell it but every buyer who stepped into the bungalow ends up dead.
1303	"Jhagdalu Aurat"	14 November 2015
Shobha lives in an apartment with her family, her lack of social skills, and bad temperament has stained her family’s name and people of her society despised her. One day Shobha is found dead in her house.
1304	"Puppet's Secret"	15 November 2015
In a busy bustling fast food joint called Romeo snacks where their BIGGEST ATTRACTION, their mascot - the popular, lovable and chubby Romeo Puppet sits on a bench, a murder happens.
1305	"Shaatir Qatil"	20 November 2015
An unconscious man lying on the floor and another man hung by his coat. The investigating team finds distinct traces of blood.
1306	"Genie's Mystery"	21 November 2015
Arvind who wanted to be rich at any cost learns of an abandoned haveli in which there is a vase and when the vase is rubbed, a Genie appears and fulfills wishes.
1307	"Killer Game"	22 November 2015
Aditya and Alisha receive threats from an unknown person saying that Kavish should not participate in the skating competition, if that happens, they will have to bear serious losses. After few days Aditya dies in a skating accident.
1308	"Coffin's Secret"	27 November 2015
A 45-year-old wealthy woman Kilori lives with her second husband Vikram. She is informed that her ex-husband Jagan, who was living in London with their three children is dead.
1309	"Haunted Bungalow"	28 November 2015
A haunted Bungalow where girls were murdered.
1310	"Murder in the Sea"	29 November 2015
Sunil was assigned for the job to kill a woman called Ankita while she was partying on a boat in the sea. However, Sunil missed and hit Ankita’s husband.
1311	"Forensic Clue"	4 December 2015
A dead body is found in a car which belongs to Harish. CID questions Harish regarding the body but Harish repeatedly pleads that he is innocent.
1312	"Dangerous Racing"	5 December 2015
Megha and Neetu- Megha's daughter were worried about Mukul as he has not been home in two days.
1313	"Vanvaas"	11 December 2015
Megha and Neetu are worried about Mukul as he has not been home in two days.
1314	"Old Mansion"	12 December 2015
Ajeet and Priya go to Ajeet's grandfather's farmhouse to have an intimate wedding with close family and friends. The farmhouse hasn't been opened for the last 40 years.
1315	"Double Trouble"	13 December 2015
A young man is killed in a locked hospital room with no clue as to the killer.
1316	"Shah Rukh Khan in Dilwale"	18 December 2015
Shera, a seasoned criminal was on the verge of reveaing dark secrets about the underworld and plan details about an attack.
1317	"Damned Case"	20 December 2015
A dead body which is recovered from the dustbin of a restaurant.
1318	"Machar Ka Rahasya"	26 December 2015
A skeleton has been discovered in the jungle by a few kids.
1319	"Aadamkhor Jaanwar"	27 December 2015
An experiment is conducted by a young girl who is researching on turning human beings into animals.

== 2016 ==
Episode	Title	Original release date
1320	"A Unique Killer"	2 January 2016
The story is revolving around the attack of honey bees. It is the occasion of Gayatry's birthday where her brother and some friends came to her house. They discover that a friend of theirs died because of an attack by bees.
1321	"Shining Skeleton"	3 January 2016
A secret deal between Anurag and a young beautiful girl happens. Both of them, have met each other in a restaurant and exchanged a wrapped packet and a brief case.
1322	"Newspaper's Secret"	3 January 2016
Ramesh was sitting with his wife and it was then his wife received a phone call. The speaker on the other side of the phone said that her husband has died and if she doesn’t believe it, she could read the obituary printed in a newspaper.
1323	"Haunted Hotel"	9 January 2016
Viren and his wife Rashi checked into a hotel for their marriage anniversary. Suddenly Viren saw a picture of a little girl in the hotel and he started screaming and asked to leave the hotel right away.
1324	"Dangerous Game"	10 January 2016
A Star-Biker has died due to excessive ignition which occurred in the fuel tank. Moreover, Nitin was forced by Roshni’s gang to participate in the deadly game.
1325	"Ghayal"	16 January 2016
CID officers found Akhil injured at his own house. Before dying he took a name of Ajay Mehra. Sunny Deol as Ajay Mehra is saving a girl named Malini.
1326	"Killer Shoes"	17 January 2016
The showroom was to be inaugurated by a famous star and just before the previous night the showroom staffs has spotted a high heel boots moving on its own and the whole showroom has become scary.
1327	"Hospital's Mystery"	23 January 2016
The case is revolving around a hospital and its corridor ghost. A lady ghost attacks people and scratched their faces.
1328	"Missing Baby Girl’s Secret"	24 January 2016
The episode is about a girl Mansi who was abducted from her car. The kidnappers have abducted her from the middle of the road.
1329	"Republic Day Special"	26 January 2016
The episode is about a mysterious double murder case and its links with each other.
1330	"Do or Die"	30 January 2016
In this episode, an old enemy of CID (Harpes Dongara) returns. He has murdered several persons for trivial reasons.
1331	"Do or Die 2"	31 January 2016
In this episode, Dr Sulankhe is dying because of a contagious viral infection. He was infected by a dead body in which some chemical tubes are implanted.
1332	"Killer mansion"	6 February 2016
CID investigate a mysterious mansion where the girls cannot stay alive.
1333	"Do or Die 3 - Valentine’s Day"	13 February 2016
The episode is about a youth named Ravi; whose dead body was found hanging in air, in the container yard.
1334	"Do or Die 4"	14 February 2016
CID is going to deal with a case of drugs smuggling racket. The smugglers have abducted a young boy named Ashu and murdered Meena.
1335	"Do or Die 5 - Katori’s Challenge to CID"	20 February 2016
The episode starts with the appearance of an apparition of a Rani that tries to scare everybody. As the story unfolds, the valuable necklace of the Rani is seen stolen.
1336	"Do or Die 6 - Mystery Behind Secret Box"	21 February 2016
Coveted CID officers Daya and Abhijeet are accused of theft. They are on a run to save their lives and seek refuge at a couple’s house.
1337	"Memory Loss"	27 February 2016
A couple requests a man to let their child go but are soon shot at. The child of the couple agrees to the kill a CID Inspector. After Daya is attacked, he loses his memory and the CID become concerned about it.
1338	"Secret of Cut Finger"	28 February 2016
The episode is about a man who is stabbed by a sharp knife. However, team CID has reached the spot and they have started investigating the case by considering it to be their top priority.
1339	"Mystery of the Statue"	5 March 2016
As a sculptor buries a man into a statue, a few goons attack his studio and destroy everything, killing two people in the process.
1340	"Nebratamba"	6 March 2016
The episode is about a group of youth who were on an adventurous trip. While trespassing into private property, they encounter an anaconda who attacks Mitesh.
1341	"Trigger Bombs"	12 March 2016
Ayesha is seen waiting impatiently for someone in a restaurant. However, a man enters, approaches her, and asks her to accompany him.
1342	"Trigger Bombs 2"	13 March 2016
The episode is about the fake princess Tilottama who has reported that her niece Ayesha has been killed.
1343	"Three Murders"	19 March 2016
A man declines to give Tina the money for the drug she just delivered but Manik soon enters the room with a gun and threatens him.
1344	"Dangerous Gang"	26 March 2016
This episode examines the Chaku Daku gang. A dead body with a secret mark on its arm is found in a jungle.
1345	"Shadows"	27 March 2016
The episode is about a haunted house where allegedly shadows of evil spirits is noticed by pedestrians.
1346	"Brave Kids"	2 April 2016
The story shows the valor of two school children who were abducted by some miscreants.
1347	"The Mysterious Woman"	3 April 2016
Dr. Vikram is seen rushing to his building by one of his neighbours and he does not look normal at all.
1348	"Fish's Secret"	9 April 2016
The episode is about a mysterious murder case, where the killer has used the skeletons of a human being to make a fish model and has displayed it in a science exhibition.
1349	"College Reunion's mystery"	16 April 2016
Episode starts when Neha and Prem were returning home from dinner party. They saw a light reflecting in a deserted house where a reunion party was going to held. Later a couple's dead body found in that house yard.
1350	"Mysterious Island"	4 June 2016
Few fishermen find an unconscious man on a boat.
1351	"Mysterious Box"	5 June 2016
The episode is about an investigation of mysterious murder case of great magician Pinzola. The magician has lot of enemies, whom he has some-way or the other betrayed at certain point of time.
1352	"Birthday Party"	11 June 2016
It’s the Birthday Party of Rishi, the owner of DK Industries and all the employees of the company have gathered for the cake cutting ceremony.
1353	"Murder in the Water Park"	12 June 2016
The episode is about a murder case of a young lady named Sheetal, who is brutally murder inside a water park. Sheetal is celebrating Rony’s birthday and it is then she is murdered in a swimming pool after descending from a ride.
1354	"Killer Bus"	18 June 2016
A business conference is scheduled in Pune and the employees of a top MNC is about to begin their journey in a bus.
1355	"Murder Invitation"	19 June 2016
Avantika invites four people to join her in a party but all of them drops her plan citing some or the other reasons.
1356	"Raseeli Ka Raaz"	25 June 2016
The episode is about an investigation of series of murder executed by man who dresses in women's attire.
1357	"Bank Robbery"	26 June 2016
Four youths plans to rob a bank in Mumbai. They are inspired after watching a movie and make a master plan to rob the bank.
1358	"Dhobi Ghat"	2 July 2016
The episode is about an investigation of a series of murder which is executed on the Dhobi Ghat of Mumbai.
1359	"Abduction"	3 July 2016
It is Aashna’s kidnaping case. Business tycoon Tejpal Kumar receives a ransom call by the kidnappers to pay 25 crore immediately.
1360	"Bioscope"	10 July 2016
Ritika is a celebrity dancer who checks into a hotel. The bell boy of the hotel is impressed and thinks about the expensive jewelleries which she has kept in her precious jewel box.
1361	"One Bullet Two Corpse"	16 July 2016
A businessman's son dies after consuming a cup of coffee and his assistant is fatally shot from a close range.
1362	"Dream Murder"	17 July 2016
The episode is about a murderous dream which has been haunting a writer for a few days.
1363	"Thak Thak Gang"	23 July 2016
Ajay is fatally shot in broad daylight in his own car. Team CID notices that the shooting was possibly at a close range.
1364	"Hypnotized Theft"	24 July 2016
Sohan and Rinky go to Kunal's house. Sohan meets Kunal's wife Amrita in the guise of a salesman. He then hypnotizes her.
1365	"Bebas Shikar"	30 July 2016
Varun has left his family for a young woman called Sapna. Varun requests his father Jaswant for financial help, but Jaswant refuses to help him. Soon, Jaswant finds his wife Savita dead in the house.
1366	"Dangerous Delivery"	31 July 2016
Rakesh enters Natasha’s house and finds the dead body of Prakash. An anonymous person calls Rakesh and tells him that he can drag his name in Prakash’s murder case.
1367	"Message of Death"	6 August 2016
Mehek and her three friends Aakash, Sonali and Atul meet each other near a bungalow. They find out that Diksha is aware about a five year old incident which had led to Uday’s death. Diksha offers them a drink containing poison.
1368	"Mumbai Darshan"	7 August 2016
A girl is murdered on a busy beach in Mumbai.
1369	"Unknown Child's Secret"	13 August 2016
Manju works as a maid in Vishal’s house. She informs her neighbors that she had seen a small boy in Vishal's house in his absence. When Manju and her colleagues enter the house, they find him lying on the floor in pool of blood.
1370	"Khufiya Adala Badali"	14 August 2016
Some goons loot a jewellery shop in broad daylight. They also kill one of the customers during the robbery.
1371	"War of Love"	20 August 2016
Rishi and Sonali run away from their homes to marry each other. Sonali's father is enraged due to her decision to leave the house.
1372	"Raaz Apaharan Ki Saazish Ka"	21 August 2016
Surekha plans to kidnap her own daughter Muskan to fleece money from her husband. Though, the kidnapping fails, Muskan managers to run away from the clutches of her kidnapper.
1373	"The Case of the Impossible Murder"	27 August 2016
Kalyani is Shayana’s stepmother and is wedded to Manav. Shayana becomes engaged to Gagan in a formal ceremony. Shayana plans to murder her stepmother. In an unexpected turn of events, Shayana is found dead in Kalyani's room.
1374	"Dangerous Jungle"	28 August 2016
Rahul, Vanshika and their friends enter a jungle to see leopards. But Sameer and Vanshika disappear.
1375	"Jaanleva Mod"	3 September 2016
On the night of Natasha’s sangeet ceremony, her relatives find Varun’s dead body lying on the lawn.
1376	"Hammer"	4 September 2016
Karan brings Aisha and Madhu to his new house. Next morning, Aisha and her friends find Madhu missing from her room.
1377	"Daya's Past"	17 September 2016
ACP Pradyuman and his team are shocked to see Daya in Shanaya's bedroom. Daya fails to recognise his own colleagues. Daya;s friends remind him that he had gone to a party, on the earlier night, to meet Yogita.
1378	"Secret of the Murder in the Closed Room"	18 September 2016
Priti finds her brother Vinod murdered in his house. Team CID obtain a half-burned document from Vinod's dead body.
1379	"The Gift"	24 September 2016
Anita asks Gaurav to hand over a parcel to Niyati. Gaurav and Niyati are shocked to see a human hand in the parcel box.
1380	"Haunted Hotel"	25 September 2016
Nilima and her friend find Aditi’s dead body in her hotel room. The two friends inform team CID that they have noticed two ghosts in the hotel.
1381	"Kanchola Ka Darr"	2 October 2016
Shivani and Vansh adopts an orphan called Abeer. After a few days, Abeer goes missing from his house. Shivani requests team CID to find her missing son. Team CID finds Vansh’s dead body near his house.
1382	"Return"	8 October 2016
Siddhant's three friends are murdered while jogging in a garden. Team CID learns that the three friends were killed by arrows.
1383	"Skull's Secret"	9 October 2016
Kanika, Sheena and Mehek meet with an accident while travelling in a car. Mehek enters a nearby post office to ask for help but finds a human skull in a room.
1384	"Secret of the Invisible Killer"	15 October 2016
Aalok dies in his house under mysterious circumstances. Team CID learns that Aalok was killed by an allegedly invisible person.
1385	"Bride"	16 October 2016
Sushila finds a mysterious woman walking inside her house. Avinash intrudes into Sushila and Prasad’s house to search his wife Rashmi. After a while, Sushila finds Avinash’s dead body outside of her house.
1386	"Trickster"	22 October 2016
Pari is a young woman who works in a mall. Pari's colleagues are surprised when they see her dead body in a refrigerator.
1387	"Two Innocent Victims"	23 October 2016
Team CID find Anjali's dead body in her house. Sudha informs team CID that she had kept two newborn babies in Abhijeet's car. Daya and his colleague find Abhijeet's car in a jungle. Abhijeet is in hunt while protecting the two babies.
1388	"Mysterious Daughter"	29 October 2016
Bhushan and his relatives, who gather in a farm house for Himani's death anniversary, are shocked to see Himani alive in the house.
1389	"Weapon in Corpse"	30 October 2016
Danny's family find a ring in his dead body on the day of his funeral. Team CID investigate the issue and find out that the ring was kept in Danny's body by Vikram. Vikram's friend informs Team CID that Vikram was a thief.
1390	"Match"	6 November 2016
Anshul and his friends prepare for a swimming competition. A villager find Anshul's dead body floating in a pond. Team CID finds out that Anshul had jumped into the pond in search of diamonds.
1391	"Mystery in the Hospital"	12 November 2016
When Viraj meets with an accident, his family admits him to a hospital. After a while, Viraj goes missing from the hospital.
1392	"Mystery of the Car"	13 November 2016
A man (from crane service) took the car and a girl.When he reached at destination, he found a corpse in car.
1393	"Death from 5000 feet"	20 November 2016
Aalok and Sonali board a plane which takes them to 5000 feet high from the ground. When Sonali hits the ground, she notices a dead body, and assumes it to be of Aalok.
1394	"Raaz Adrushya Padosi Ka"	26 November 2016
Team CID notice Amar, Ruhan and Sanjay's dead bodies in an apartment and find Kinjal sitting beside them with an iron rod.
1395	"Mysterious Painting"	27 November 2016
A security guard finds Vikas's dead body in an apartment. When team CID reaches the venue, the security guard shows them a painting of a woman placed on a wall.
1396	"Cop or Killer"	3 December 2016
Team CID identifies Abhijeet as a suspect in the shooting death of Ghanashyam. Abhijeet tells ACP Pradyuman that he had threatened to kill Ghanashyam in the past but has not murdered him.
1397	"Maut ka Veham"	4 December 2016
Shokhi meets ACP Pradyuman and tells him that she has murdered Rajesh. She requests him to arrest her. Team CID learns that Shokhi is innocent and has not killed Rajesh and has Daya become Shokhi’s girlfriend.
1398	"Chehre Pe Chehra"	10 December 2016
Maitreyi suffers from partial blindness due to which she is unable to recognize people's faces. She becomes involved in the murder case of someone called Velvet.
1399	"Khuni Chupta Nahi"	11 December 2016
Natasha is murdered during a video chat with her friends. Team CID learns that an anonymous person used to send romantic poems on Natasha's mobile phone.
1400	"Correct Timing"	18 December 2016
An anonymous person kills Mr. and Mrs. Naren with the help of an iron rod. Team CID learns that a gang is active in the city who attacks innocent people with iron rods to rob them. However, the person who killed the couple is found to not be part of the gang.

== 2017 ==
Episode	Title	Original release date
1401	"Happy New Year"	1 January 2017
ACP Pradyuman and his team go to a New Year's Eve party. DJ Dash suffers a heart attack while playing songs there.
1402	"Kaanch Ke Paar"	8 January 2017
Nirjar is an overbearing businessman who bullies his servant Monu. When Monu breaks an expensive wine glass, Nirjar insults him in front of his guests. Nirjar is murdered by an unknown assailant on the same night.
1403	"Prediction"	14 January 2017
Team CID finds a famous astrologer Bhanukar dead in his office. While investigating, ACP Pradyuman and his team learn that Bhanukar used to predict accurate future for his clients.
1404	"Statue"	15 January 2017
Markus works in a restaurant as a chef. Markus collapses to his death while shooting for a 'mannequin challenge' in the restaurant.
1405	"Mysterious Suicide"	22 January 2017
Viraj is a social activist who is under constant threat of being killed by his enemies. Jay and Rani watch Viraj jumping off a bridge into a river. They assume that Viraj has committed suicide. However, it is later revealed that he was murdered.
1406	"Closed Eyes"	29 January 2017
Rohit invites his girlfriend Megha to his bungalow. Next morning, team CID find Megha's dead body near Varun's construction site.
1407	"Mystery of Laundry"	4 February 2017
Rupen is shot and killed by two bikers in broad daylight. Team CID learn that Rupen once ran a laundry business.
1408	"Cunning Murderer"	12 February 2017
Team CID finds a sight of a murder through a pre-recorded ‘virtual-reality’ video. While investigating, ACP Pradyuman and his team learn that a detective called Prashant is murdered.
1409	"Secret of Fake Pistol and a Real Bullet"	26 February 2017
Kyra is a famous actress who once visit a mall for the opening ceremony of a shop. An anonymous person guns down Kyra in the mall. Team CID learn that Kyra was killed by a ghost gun.
1410	"Killer Courier"	5 March 2017
Monika receives a courier from an anonymous person. When Monika's husband comes home, he is surprised to see her lying dead in the living room.
1411	"Maut Ki Dastak"	11 March 2017
ACP Pradyuman's friend Kunal is a crime journalist from Mumbai. Kunal falls unconscious in a hospital. ACP Pradyuman learns that a martial arts practitioner had previously injured Kunal.
1412	"Voice of crime"	12 March 2017
Team CID find Rajiv’s dead body in his house. Rajiv’s wife tells ACP Pradyuman and his team that Rajiv had suspected paranormal activities in his apartment.
1413	"Match"	18 March 2017
Akash invites Daya to play football with his friends. Akash’s opponent Dino dies after a brawl with Daya on the field and his sister blames Daya. Forensics, however, reveal traces of drugs in Dino’s body.
1414	"Filmy Murder"	19 March 2017
Director duo Abbas–Mustan host the premiere of their new movie Machine in a theatre. While screening of the movie, Ayan is murdered inside the theatre hall.
1415	"Video of Death"	25 March 2017
Dhiraj is a famous social media enthusiast. An anonymous person kills Dhiraj in front of a camera and broadcasts the video on his social media account.
1416	"Vasiyat ka Raaz"	26 March 2017
A rich businessman called Jayantilal dies under mysterious circumstances.
1417	"Jungle"	1 April 2017
Senior forest officer Kartik is killed by an alleged wild animal in a jungle. Daya meets Kartik's colleagues to investigate the case.
1418	"Khoon Ki Saazish"	15 April 2017
Dr. Ranjeet dies during his heart surgery. The hospital staff tells team CID that Dr. Ranjeet must have been murdered during the operation.
1419	"Final Evidence"	16 April 2017
One night, few criminals were running behind a bleeding man.The man came in front of a car and died.
1420	"Killer Journey"	22 April 2017
An anonymous person throws Manish off a moving train which leads to Manish’s death. CID finds diamonds in his pocket.
1421	"Killer Journey 2"	23 April 2017
Episode continues with the search of Manish’s murderer. Team CID plan to travel in a train to find out the murderer.
1422	"Corpse in the Sea"	29 April 2017
A helicopter blasts in mid-air before it crashes into a sea. Few fishermen rush towards the scene to rescue the survivors.
1423	"Accident or Crime"	30 April 2017
A speeding car rams into a tree on a busy city street. Team CID find Aman’s dead body in the car.
1424	"Bank Robbery"	6 May 2017
Team CID arrest a bank manager called Malini when she tries to loot a bank. Malini tells ACP Pradyuman and his team that an anonymous person had forced her to rob the bank.
1425	"Kaun Hai?"	7 May 2017
Arvind and Sima go to a jungle for an adventure trip. Sima is surprised when an anonymous person kills Arvind in the jungle.
1426	"Strange Theft"	13 May 2017
A few goons loot money from a cash van. Team CID learn that the goons had used thermal imaging camera while looting the van.
1427	"Imtihaan Ki Ghadi"	14 May 2017
The police arrests Abhijeet for allegedly killing a goon called Vikrant. Abhijeet admits his offence.
1428	"Rusi Paheli"	20 May 2017
Team CID find a dead body of a young woman in a car. They soon learn that the body belongs to a Russian woman called Natalia.
1429	"Ghost Lift"	21 May 2017
Amit goes missing after he enters an elevator of his apartment. Team CID learn that an anonymous person has killed Amit.
1430	"Mystery of Missing People"	27 May 2017
Pankaj’s friend Snehal goes missing while travelling by her car. Pankaj requests ACP Pradyuman to help him find his missing friend.
1431	"Agni Parisksha"	28 May 2017
Dilip's family is shocked when he is burnt to death in a party. Team CID learn that Dilip and his business partner Rohan were responsible for a nine-year-old criminal case.
1432	"Bloody Dream"	3 June 2017
Rayma tells team CID that she saw a murder in a hotel. Rayma's husband tells ACP Pradyuman that his wife has sleep paralysis.
1433	"Phone Explosion"	4 June 2017
Rocky holds a mobile phone near his face while shooting for its advertisement. The mobile phone explodes and catches fire. Rocky falls on the ground and dies immediately due to the explosion.
1434	"Pickpockets"	10 June 2017
A few pickpockets are killed under suspicious circumstances. Team CID recover a radioactive detector machine from a pickpocket.
1435	"Secret of Explosion"	11 June 2017
A lunatic college student explodes a bomb in front of his college. Team CID recover a human skeleton from the scene.
1436	"Three killers"	18 June 2017
An entrepreneur is found dead in his hotel room by his employees. The CID team is called in to investigate the crime scene.
1437	"The Curse in the Mansion"	24 June 2017
The CID team receives a call from a woman. The woman informs ACP Pradyuman that her fiance, Raj, is dead.
1438	"Mystery Beneath the Shadows"	25 June 2017
Sudhir celebrating his 60th birthday was found dead along with his family under mysterious circumstances.
1439	"The Unseen Murderer"	1 July 2017
The CID team begins investigation into the murder of Mr. Seth. The team apprehends four youths, who the team suspect, are behind Mr. Seth's murder.
1440	"A Singer's Mysterious Death"	2 July 2017
The CID team begins investigation into the mysterious death of a singer, KD, who died before his recording inside the studio.
1441	"The Message of Death"	8 July 2017
Tina, while travelling in a taxi, receives a text message, which warns her that the taxi in which she is travelling is not safe.
1442	"Killer Smartphone"	9 July 2017
Budding entrepreneur Kartik Kumar is killed in a car accident. Soon, the team discover that Kartik's death was not an accident but a cold-blooded murder.
1443	"The Secret of the Eye"	15 July 2017
ACP Pradyuman receives a phone call from Bala, who has been on the run for over a decade. Bala offers to surrender to the CID but on one condition - the team must reopen the case of his daughter's death. ACP Pradyuman suspects that Bala's life is in danger. The CID team arrives at a crime scene to investigate the death of a man.
1444	"Bala’s Return"	16 July 2017
ACP Pradyuman suspects that Bala's life is in danger. The CID team arrives at a crime scene to investigate the death of a man.
1445	"Obsessive Fan"	22 July 2017
A fan's obsession makes life miserable for Riya. The fan turns into a stalker, as with each passing day, he becomes more and more obsessed about Riya.
1446	"Shot At Point Blank"	23 July 2017
A crime is witnessed but becomes too hard to prove. Subodh, a stage director, is shot dead by an unidentified assailant and his murder is witnessed by his team.
1447	"Gambling With Life"	29 July 2017
A family returns to their vacation home to spend their holidays. But, their holiday turns out to be a nightmare after they discover a dead body in their house.
1448	"Speed Dating"	30 July 2017
A woman's dead body is discovered on a beach in Mumbai.
1449	"The Paralysed Killer"	5 August 2017
Professor Gyan has been paralysed since two years. Sandeep, his close aide, visits him and his family, and gives them a cheque of INR 25 lakhs. However, he is found murdered, and the CID find a knife placed in Gyan's hand.
1450	"Marathon Magnet"	6 August 2017
While talking to his boss on a video call, Rohan, is strangulated to death using a laptop wire.
1451	"Death In An Abandoned Building"	12 August 2017
An abandoned building is about to be demolished for redevelopment. On the day of demolition, an eccentric man searches for his missing cat and finds a corpse there.
1452	"Death on Social Media"	13 August 2017
A girl wakes up in the morning and receives murder threat messages from one of her neighbour's phones, so she rushes to her apartment and finds her dead.
1453	"Death By Laughter"	19 August 2017
An argument breaks out between two individuals during a stand-up comedy event. The next day, a man is found dead in his office.
1454	"A Dead Body In The Woods"	20 August 2017
The CID team is baffled with an intriguing mystery that is proving impossible to solve. Meanwhile, yet another murder mystery takes the CID team into its vortex.
1455	"Horror House"	26 August 2017
While returning from an event, Abhijeet, Daya, Purvi and Pankaj come across an injured women on the road. Daya and Abhijeet ask Purvi and Pankaj to take the women to the hospital.
1456	"The Game of Death"	27 August 2017
Preeti is playing an online game, which relies on victimising its players. A man, who hides behind a mask, orders the players to carry out certain tasks, which sometimes turn deadly.
1457	"The Beachside Mystery"	2 September 2017
While investigating the mysterious death of Kamal Kumar, a crime novelist, Dr Salunkhe is attacked by the beachside.
1458	"The Half-Visioned Witness"	3 September 2017
Sarika, who suffers from a rare brain disorder, can only see half side of a person. The CID is summoned after she is attacked, and suspect that the family members are involved.
1459	"Bathtub Murders"	9 September 2017
Dr. Salunkhe receives a call from Mansi, the wife of his college mate, Keshav. She informs him that Keshav is dead.
1460	"The Monkey Suspects"	10 September 2017
At a shopping mall, a jewellery shop salesman is murdered and several uncut diamonds disappear from the showroom.
1461	"Death Of Informers"	16 September 2017
The CID panic when two of Abhijeet's informers are mysteriously killed. The common factor that links both these murders are a set of dentures left by the killer.
1462	"Ghostly Riddle"	17 September 2017
A car is speeding on the highway in the middle of nowhere. Vineet, who is driving the car, makes a frantic call to Leela, asking for help. Leela informs the CID team and pleads with them to save Vineet's life.
1463	"The Puppet Killer"	23 September 2017
On a rainy evening, Madan, a middle-aged young man is found dead in his apartment. The CID recount him telling them that there is a threat to his life.
1464	"Kidnap"	24 September 2017
A gang kidnaps three employees of R.K. Webs Company. They make a footage and demand five crore worth of diamonds.
1465	"Killer Artist"	7 October 2017
Ex-Crime branch officer Ketan makes a video call to Abhijeet to show him his new farmhouse. Suddenly, Ketan is fatally stabbed. Mehan, Abhijeet's colleague, is also found dead. The murderer holds CID responsible for the death of his love four years back when Abhijeet, Ketan, Mehan, and Purvi were solving a case.
1466	"Serial Killer"	8 October 2017
A few women across the city are confined by an unknown assailant. The CID team learns about this incident after one of the victims is found dead.
1467	"Skylight"	14 October 2017
Ayesha dies in her house after coming back from the court. The CID team find out that Ayesha died in the presence of police protection in her house.
1468	"The Blind Witness"	15 October 2017
A blind man hears an argument. Wanting to find out more he moves towards the sound. Then, he hears a woman calling for help. Before he can take action, he is hit on the back of his head and loses consciousness.
1469	"Fox Hunting"	21 October 2017
A man is hit on the head at night by an unidentified assailant. The CID team receives a call from his friend, asking them to save his life. The man informs that Shashank was fox hunting and has been missing ever since.
1470	"Black Forest Blast"	22 October 2017
The CID team enters the forest to find the sender of the warning message. The team covers almost forest finding the culprit, but couldn't find any person.
1471	"Faceless Killer"	28 October 2017
A man, hiding his face in a hoodie, bumps into a stranger on the road. The stranger soon is rushed to the hospital but breathes his last.
1472	"The Secret Box"	11 November 2017
At a restaurant, two men are found dead and the CID team is called in to investigate. At the crime scene, the CID team find a gift box.
1473	"The Unknown Story"	12 November 2017
The CID team receives a call about the death of a person in the reception function. Investigation reveals that one of the person is somehow related to murder. Meanwhile, the CID team discovers that the person has lost her memory.
1474	"Deadly Message"	18 November 2017
Tina is dejected as Sameer has failed to keep up to his promise. Sameer tries to win over Tina. Then, he receives a message on a social networking app. When he arrives, he finds that Tina has been brutally murdered.
1475	"Infiltration"	19 November 2017
The CID team break into a bungalow where a notorious hacker is hiding. They find a secret route that leads towards the hacker’s den. At the end of the passage, they find the hacker pointing a gun at them.
1476	"Bomb Blast"	26 November 2017
The bomb squad receives a phone call about a car carrying a bomb in the parking lot of a mall.
1477	"Secret of Magical Knife"	9 December 2017
College friends meets after long time in the resort. Few of the group members decide to take a steam bath, whereas few decide to take a hot water bath. Suddenly, people in the steam bath notice a member being stabbed.
1478	"Lost in the Jungle"	10 December 2017
Ayesha is lost in a jungle. Unable to contact anyone she makes an attempt to find a route out of the dense jungle. Before she can exit the forest, she is attacked by an unknown assailant.
1479	"Bride Killer"	16 December 2017
The CID team is out to solve a murder mystery. Abhijeet, Daya, Purvi & ACP Pradyuman investigate near a cave expecting to find some important clues.
1480	"The Secret of Mortuary"	17 December 2017
Raghav enters a room with an intention of robbery but finds a bomb inside a bag. Meanwhile, Raghav's daughter Radhika tries to help a blind and dies in an accident.
1481	"Pankaj's decision"	23 December 2017
ACP Pradyuman accuses Pankaj as the only suspect in the murder case.
1482	"Skeleton in the tree"	24 December 2017
The episode starts with a guy waiting for someone in a car on the highway.
1483	"Dangerous Abhijeet"	30 December 2017
The episode starts with Daya's dead body lying in a morgue and the entire CID team standing there in shock. The prime suspect in his murder is Abhijeet who also reaches there to see his dead partner.
1484	"Killer house"	31 December 2017
Vijay sitting in his house watch a horror movie. Later, he dies because of shock from an open wire.

== 2018 ==
Episode	Title	Original release date
1485	"Daya a Murderer ^"	6 January 2018
A young child has been kidnapped, and CID have been tasked with rescuing him. At the ransom exchange, Daya shoots and kills the kidnapper by mistake, putting the child’s life is in danger.
1486	"Woh Kon Tha"	7 January 2018
A husband entered in home.His wife anxiouly told him that few hours ago he was bleeding and needed her help.
1487	"Murder in the Sky"	13 January 2018
Three men charter a private plane which crashes into the sea on the way to its destination, killing all the passengers.
1488	"Mannequin Murders"	14 January 2018
When the headless body of a woman is found in the workshop of a boutique, CID are brought on to the investigation.
1489	"CID 20 Years Later - Part I"	20 January 2018
CID finally has a lead on the head of The Eye, the identity of their best hacker, Ajinkya.
1490	"CID 20 Years Later - Part II"	21 January 2018
CID team has finally found and arrested the leader of The Eye, Barbosa.But Barbosa is found an imitator.
1491	"Return"	27 January 2018
A posh Mumbai colony is in for a shock when a headless kidnapper from their past returns from the dead to punish all of them for having cut off his head 12 years ago.
1492	"Love for the Environment"	28 January 2018
Someone is wandering around the city, murdering people. CID find that the victims are people who harmed the environment.
1493	"Drug Smuggling"	3 February 2018
A couple, Jatin and Monica, have traveled to Zibia - a south Asian country with harsh drug laws.
1494	"Trick"	4 February 2018
A man witnesses a girl being stabbed in the building opposite his, and informs CID.
1495	"Murderous Trick"	10 February 2018
A rich man is kidnapped by four goons and later found dead.
1496	"Sound of Fear"	11 February 2018
A suicide helpline is called by someone claiming to be a pregnant woman who has no option left in life but to kill herself.
1497	"Dangerous Killer"	17 February 2018
CID are stumped when ordinary people without any history of crime kill people whom they have no connection to for no apparent reason.
1498	"Game of Clues"	18 February 2018
Dr. Salunkhe receives a peculiar gift card that shows the CID team the way to the scene of a heinous murder on a desolate property in the woods.
1499	"Killer Sky"	24 February 2018
Two adventure-sport enthusiasts, a paraglider and a trekker, are shot at a height of 4000, while paragliding.
1500	"Free Delivery"	25 February 2018
A serial killer murders delivery boys of shopping websites.
1501	"Reality or Dream"	3 March 2018
Ever since she came back from a trip, a young artist Komal has been having strange nightmares about a woman, a house, a man and a murder.
1502	"The Secret of the Murder of Thieves"	4 March 2018
A man, Tony is killed mysteriously in his office by an unknown assailant.
1503	"Murderer Behind A Mask"	10 March 2018
A masked man is going around the city stabbing random people.
1504	"A Dead Body in the River"	11 March 2018
A group of fishermen are out on a fishing trip at a river. They cast their net and are surprised to find stacks of currency notes. They cast their net wider and to their shock, find 2 dead bodies as well.
1505	"Dark Town"	17 March 2018
A new, murderous presence is haunting the city. Invisible, quiet, and deadly, it mystifies the CID after leaving a dead industrialist in its wake.
1506	"Killer Photo"	18 March 2018
A wealthy couple receives a photoshopped family photo frame as an anonymous gift on the occasion of their wedding anniversary.
1507	"Daya Missing"	31 March 2018
CID is called to look into the case of double suicide when a man and his wife shot themselves. But the mystery starts when Daya disappears while investigating the case.
1508	"Game of Death"	1 April 2018
Cops find a strange man covered in blood. He has no recollection of what has happened to him.
1509	"Murder in an Aeroplane"	7 April 2018
Abhijeet is on board a plane where a man has been killed by a deadly nerve agent.
1510	"Kidnapping"	8 April 2018
When a young boy goes missing for days, CID spring into action, only to find the kidnapper himself murdered in an ambulance.
1511	"Magical Murder"	14 April 2018
A famous illusionist Zoravar is proven a fraud at his own show by a mysterious man by the name of Ilesh and hours later, the man is killed in a supernatural way.
1512	"Helpless Killer"	15 April 2018
A girl named Aisha is on a phone call when she suddenly feels dizzy and falls down. She is found dead.
1513	"Murder in the Moving Car"	21 April 2018
A woman has been shot in a moving vehicle and surprisingly even her ex-husband who was driving the vehicle was not aware.
1514	"The Secret of the Wishful Snake"	22 April 2018
The police investigate a case whose suspect is a dead snake who has returned as a ghost to take revenge.
1515	"After 100 Years"	28 April 2018
Behram was a dreaded serial killer who killed hundreds of people a century ago.
1516	"Invisible Killer"	29 April 2018
A man who has had an organ transplant is shot dead in broad daylight from a car that has no driver and it seems as though the car is being driven by some genie.
1517	"House of Death ^{*}"	5 May 2018
Abhijit has a terrifying experience in a haunted house which leaves him shaken. He remembers seeing 2 dead bodies inside but when the cops check the next day, there is no trace of anything suspicious.
1518	"Daya The Murderer"	6 May 2018
Paresh, running from someone enters a construction building where he is almost stabbed to death by someone. He is taken to the hospital by the security of the building. When he comes to his senses he states that he was attacked by none other than the CID officer Daya.
1519	"Missing Dead Body"	12 May 2018
Kirti comes home to find his brother Bakul and the sister-in-law, dead and seriously injured.
1520	"Daya's Marriage"	12 May 2018
Daya returns home after an exhausting day involving murders of two spies and their daughter being placed in CID's care, only to find a pretty village girl waiting for him at home.
1521	"The Haunting Truth"	13 May 2018
There is a ceremonial function at SPJK Memorial hospital. A woman targets the head speaker, tries to shoot him, but things turn otherwise when the gun back fires and the woman is spot dead.
1522	"Killer Tune"	19 May 2018
A deadly serial killer escapes while being transferred to another prison and starts killing again.
1523	"Message from the Future - Part I"	20 May 2018
Abhijit is being troubled by a mysterious entity, who warns him that his entire team is going to die.
1524	"Message from the Future - Part II"	26 May 2018
After the CID walks into a trap laid by the Eye, we see them become fugitives from the law.
1525	"Killer Mind"	2 June 2018
A judge shoots a criminal in court and kills himself.
1526	"Impossible Murder"	3 June 2018
An owner of an expensive diamond gathers all the criminals at one place and challenges all of them to steal his diamond from a safe room which he believes is unbreakable.
1527	"Mysterious Woman"	9 June 2018
A man is killed mysteriously at a party. The only link to his death is a woman named Anna, who died years ago in an accident.
1528	"School of Addiction"	16 June 2018
When a student union leader dies due to drug overdose in a medical college, someone signals the local cop that it is actually a murder.
1529	"Cheat"	23 June 2018
A man is talking to his wife on the phone and he hears her scream to her death.
1530	"Cricket Blast"	24 June 2018
The star batsman of a domestic cricket league team is killed in an explosion in the middle of the pitch.
1531	"Revenge of 10 Years"	30 June 2018
CID cops learn that a released prisoner Krakatoa has a plan to take down ACP for arresting him but ACP does pay heed to it.
1532	"Revenge of 10 Years"	1 July 2018
The cops confront Krakatoa but he challenges ACP to kill Abhijit and Daya in exchange for his grandson.
1533	"The Secret of the Missing Cars"	14 July 2018
A number of cars are stolen in the city and one of the owners is brutally murdered.
1534	"Killer Jungle"	15 July 2018
When Karthik goes inside a distant forest trying to find someone, an unknown figure jumps on top of him and kills him instantly.
1535	"Preparation for Murder"	21 July 2018
During the shooting of a film, the crew discovers a dead body buried in a forest.
1536	"The Strange Spy"	22 July 2018
The case begins with a murder that has taken place at a hotel.
1537	"Testing Time"	22 September 2018
While trying to evade the police, two men crash their car.
1538	"Vicious Killer"	23 September 2018
The sensation haunted house that has a deep-seated mystery in it.
1539	"Fainted Killer"	29 September 2018
A paralysed coma patient is accused of murder by 5 eyewitnesses even though she cannot move a finger.
1540	"Death Sentence"	30 September 2018
While investigating a kidnapping case, Daya lands in trouble. Daya is lured into a trap and ends up being confined.
1541	"Abhijit's Justice"	6 October 2018
Abhijeet stands accused of intentionally killing a culprit.
1542	"Mysterious Witness"	7 October 2018
A committee appoints Sheetal as a supervising officer, who will monitor CID team's every move: their investigations and reports.
1543	"Mysterious Weapon - Part I"	13 October 2018
CID learn about the mysterious death of an internet celebrity named Siddharth. Daya and Abhijeet take up the case as ACP Pradyuman is busy with Jimmy's birthday celebrations. The case takes a sharp turn when ACP's son Jimmy is shot dead while attempting to assist the CID in nabbing the criminals. Dejected, ACP Pradyuman leaves CID.
1544	"Mysterious Weapon - Part II"	14 October 2018
Abhijeet receives a message on his phone claiming that information stored in a pen drive will lead the CID to the eye gang.
1545	"Last Challenge"	20 October 2018
A severed head is found in a bowling alley.
1546	"The Message"	21 October 2018
1547	"The Final Challenge"	27 October 2018

^{^} Denotes 2 hours episode
^{*} Denotes super episode
