= Waiting room =

Area where people wait for an appointment or event

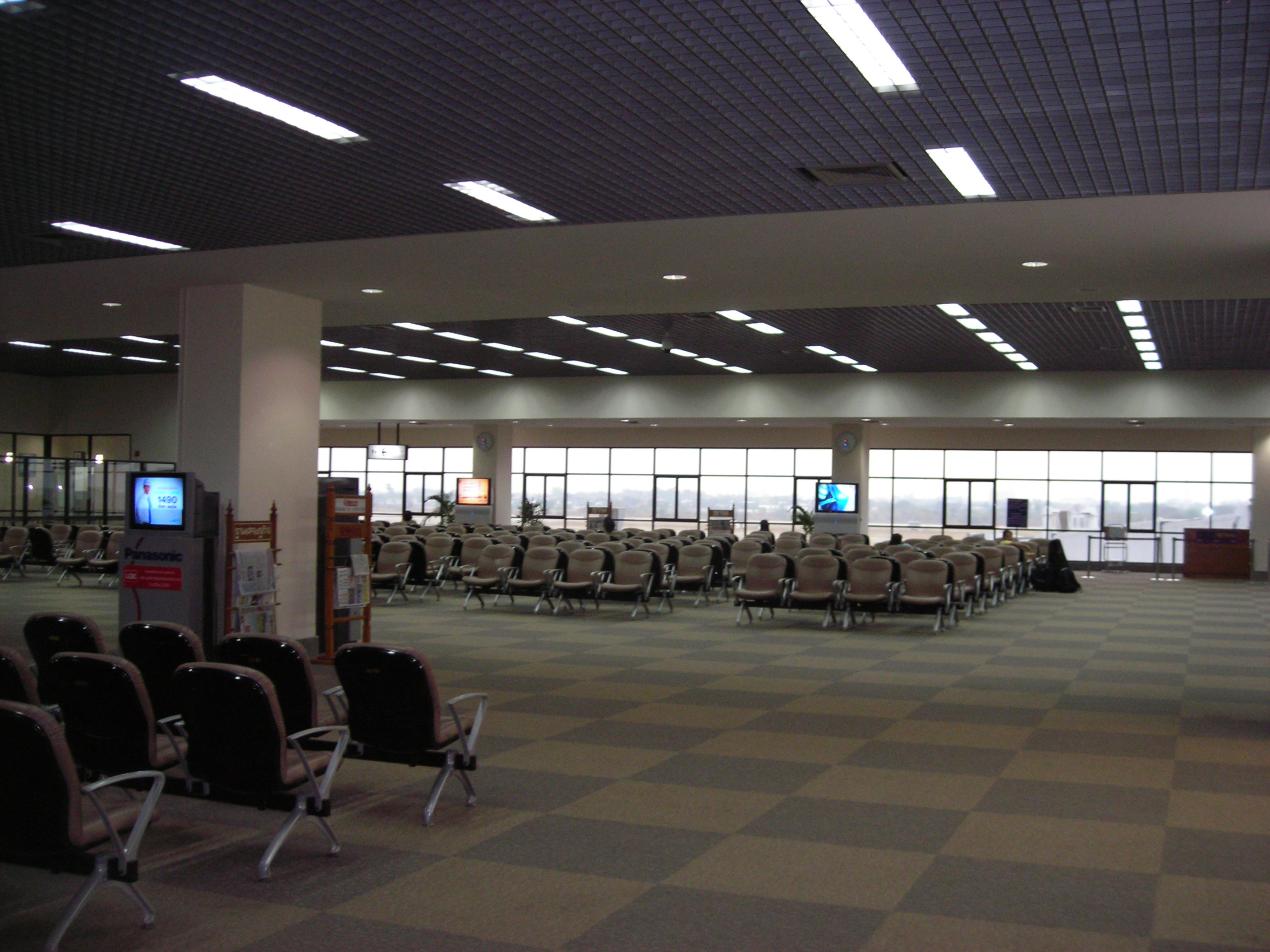
Waiting room for passengers at Udon Thani International Airport, Thailand

A waiting room or waiting hall is a room or area where people sit or stand until the event or appointment for which they are waiting begins.

There are two types of physical waiting room. One has individuals leave for appointments one at a time or in small groups, for instance at a doctor's office, a hospital triage area, or outside a school headmaster's office. The other has people leave en masse such as those at railway stations, bus stations, and airports. Both examples also highlight the difference between private waiting rooms, in which one is directed to wait, and public waiting rooms in which one can enter at will. There are also digital waiting rooms that operate within online video conferencing applications such as Zoom, where participants can be held until such time as the host allows them to enter the meeting.

== Order in private rooms ==
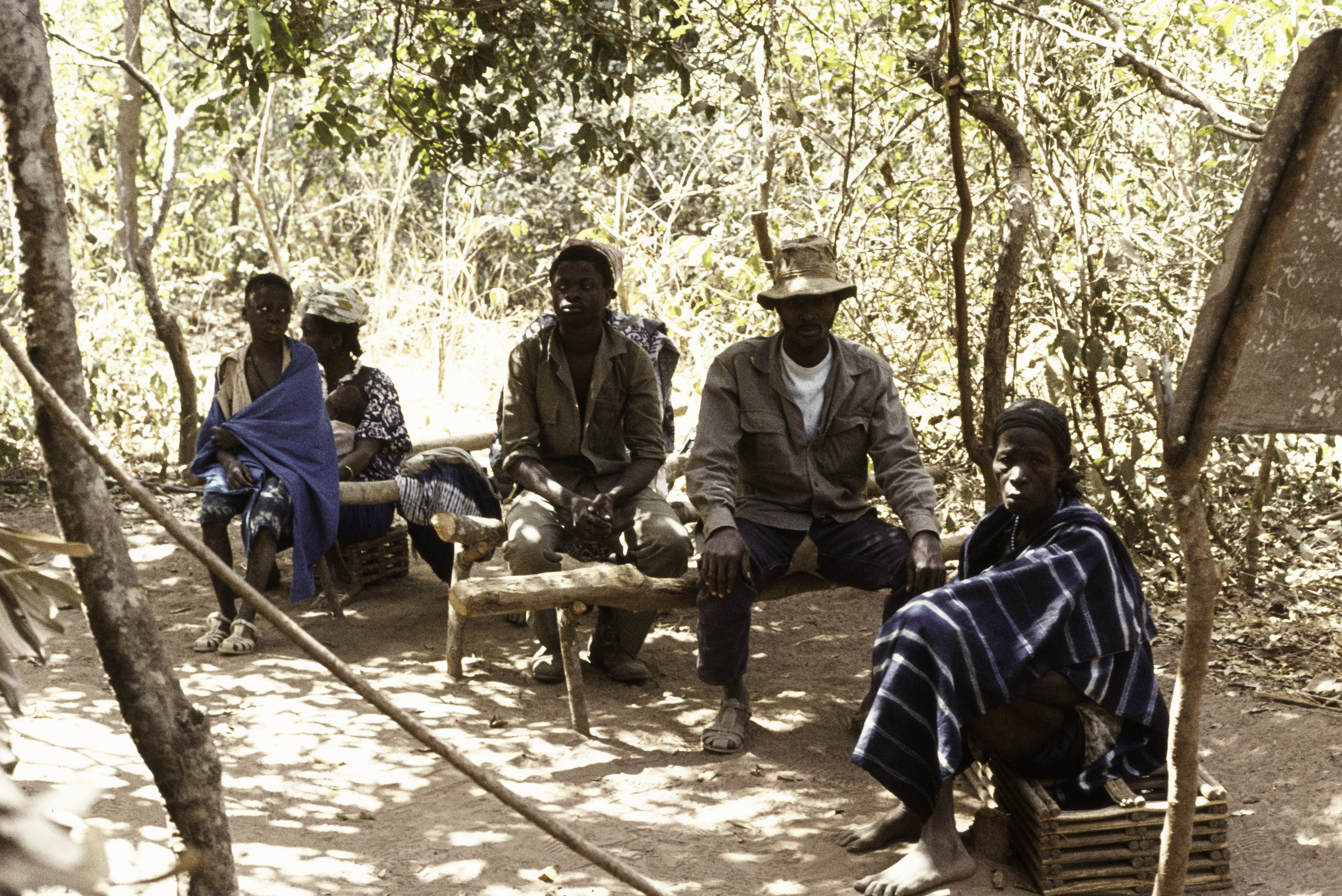
Medical open air waiting room. Infirmary at Canjambari, Guinea-Bissau, 1974

People in private waiting rooms are queued based on various methods in different types of waiting rooms. In hospital emergency department waiting areas, patients are triaged by a nurse, and they are seen by the doctor in order depending on the severity of their medical condition. In a doctor's or dentist's waiting room, patients are generally seen in the order in which their appointments are for, with the exception of emergency cases, which get seen immediately upon their arrival. In Canada, where there is publicly-provided health care, controversy has arisen when some important people or celebrities have jumped the line (which is supposed to be based on the appointment order or by severity of condition). In some government offices, such as motor vehicle registration offices or social assistance services, there is a "first-come, first-served" approach in which clients take a number when they arrive. The clients are then seen in the order of their number. In the 2010s, some government offices have a triage-based variant of the first-come, first-served approach, in which some clients are seen by the civil servants faster than others, depending on the nature of their service request and/or the availability of civil servants. This approach can lead to frustration for clients who are waiting, because one client who has been waiting for 30 minutes may see another client come in, take a number, and then be seen within five minutes.

In car repair shops, clients typically wait until their vehicle is repaired; the service manager can only give an estimate of the approximate waiting time. Clients waiting in the entrance or waiting area of a restaurant for a table normally are seated based on whether they have reservations; those without reservations are served on a first-come, first-served approach, though important customers or celebrities may be put to the front of the line. In restaurants, customers may also be able to jump the line by giving a large gratuity or bribe to the maitre d'hotel or head waiter. Some restaurants which are co-located with or combined with a retail store or gift shop ask customers who are waiting for a table to browse in the merchandise section until their table's availability is announced on a PA system or via a pager; this strategy can lead to increased purchases in the retail part of the establishment. One combination restaurant/store is the US Cracker Barrel chain. Some restaurants ask customers who are waiting for a table to sit in the restaurant's bar or its licensed lounge area; this approach may lead to increased sales of alcoholic beverages.

Waiting rooms may be staffed or unstaffed. In waiting rooms that are staffed, a receptionist or administrative staffer sits behind a desk or counter to greet customers/clients, give them information about the expected waiting period, and answer any questions about their appointment time or the appointment process. In doctors' or dentists' waiting rooms, the patients may be able to make additional appointments, pay for appointments, or deal with other administrative tasks with the receptionist or administrator. In police stations, check cashing stores, and some government waiting rooms, the receptionist or administrator is behind a plexiglass barrier, with either small holes to permit communication, or, in higher-security settings, a microphone and speaker. In reception areas with a plexiglass barrier, there may be a heavy-duty drawer to enable the client to provide money or papers to the receptionist and for the receptionist to provide documents to the client. The plexiglass barrier and the drawer system help to protect the receptionists from aggressive or potentially violent clients.

== Amenities ==
Most waiting rooms have seating. Some have adjacent toilets. It is not uncommon to find vending machines in public waiting rooms or newspapers and magazines in private waiting rooms. Also common in waiting rooms in the United States or in airports are public drinking fountains. Some waiting rooms have television access or music. The increasing prevalence of mobile devices has led to many waiting rooms providing electric outlets and free Wi-Fi Internet connections, though cybersecurity is a concern as unsecured connections may be vulnerable to attack, tampering, or even simply by piggybacking users who are within range but not waiting. Sometimes found in airports and railway stations are special waiting rooms, often called "lounges", for those who have paid more. These will generally be less crowded and will have superior seating and better facilities. Waiting rooms for high-end services may provide complimentary drinks and snacks.

== In other media ==
=== In fiction ===
The films Brief Encounter and The Terminal use waiting rooms as sets for a large part of their duration. They are used elsewhere in the arts to symbolize waiting in the general sense, to symbolize transitions in life and for scenes depicting emptiness, insignificance or sadness. In the play No Exit, by French existentialist philosopher Jean-Paul Sartre, several strangers find themselves waiting in a mysterious room, where they each wonder why; finally, they each realize that they are in Hell, and that their punishment is being forced to be with each other ("L'enfer, c'est les autres", which translates as "Hell is other people").

In the 2010 Bollywood film The Waiting Room, directed by Maneej Premnath and produced by Sunil Doshi, four passengers waiting in a remote South Indian railway station are stranded there on a rainy night. A serial killer is on the prowl, targeting the passengers of the waiting room, creating intense fear among them.

=== In video games ===
The term "waiting room" also extends to the realm of video games as a virtual area where players are placed while waiting for an online multiplayer session to begin. A virtual waiting room may be a static loading screen or an interactive matchmaking interface, such as the worldwide globe in Mario Kart Wii's online WFC. Alternatively, it can be a playable environment in and of itself where readied players can practice their skills to pass the time. A prominent example is the dedicated arena in Super Smash Bros. Brawl and its sequels, where players can practice fighting moves with their chosen character until others arrive.

== See also ==
- Airport lounge
- Waiting in healthcare
