= Watchful waiting =

Clinical management approach

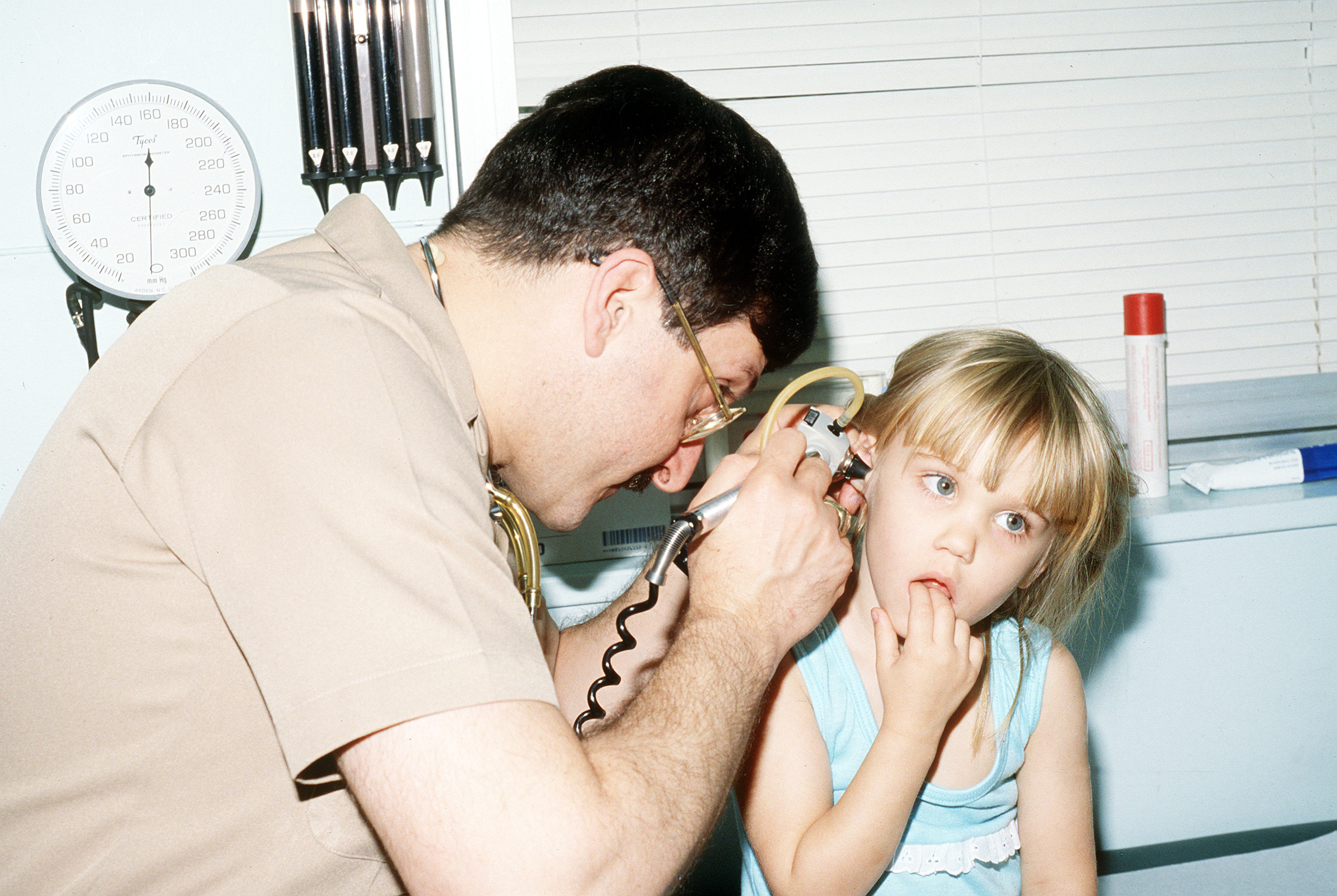
A doctor checks a patient for a possible ear infection.

Watchful waiting (also watch and wait or WAW) is an approach to a medical problem in which time is allowed to pass before medical intervention or therapy is used. During this time, repeated testing may be performed.

Related terms include expectant management, active surveillance (especially active surveillance of prostate cancer), and masterly inactivity. The term masterly inactivity is also used in nonmedical contexts.

A distinction can be drawn between watchful waiting and medical observation, but some sources equate the terms. Usually, watchful waiting is an outpatient process and may have a duration of months or years. In contrast, medical observation is usually an inpatient process, often involving frequent or even continuous monitoring and may have a duration of hours or days.

== Medical uses ==
Often watchful waiting is recommended in situations with a high likelihood of self-resolution if there is high uncertainty concerning the diagnosis, and the risks of intervention or therapy may outweigh the benefits.

Watchful waiting is often recommended for many common illnesses such as ear infections in children; because the majority of cases resolve spontaneously, antibiotics will often be prescribed only after several days of symptoms. It is also a strategy frequently used in surgery prior to a possible operation, when it is possible for a symptom (for example abdominal pain) to either improve naturally or become worse.

Other examples include:

- the diagnosis and treatment of benign prostatic hyperplasia
- depression
- otitis media
- inguinal hernia
- odd behaviors in infants
- non-symptomatic kidney stones
- gender dysphoria in children prior to the onset of puberty

== Process ==
=== Watchful waiting ===
In many applications, a key component of watchful waiting is the use of an explicit decision tree or other protocol to ensure a timely transition from watchful waiting to another form of management, as needed. This is particularly common in the post-surgical management of cancer survivors, in whom cancer recurrence is a significant concern.

=== Medical observation ===
Usually, patients in observation, according to hospital policy, are kept in observation for only 24 or 48 hours before they will be discharged or admitted as an inpatient. Insurance can play a role in how "observation" is defined (for example, US Medicare does not support observation services for over 48 hours).

== See also ==
- Public health surveillance
- Waiting in healthcare
- Monitoring (medicine)
