= Waiting in healthcare =

Time before or during patient treatment

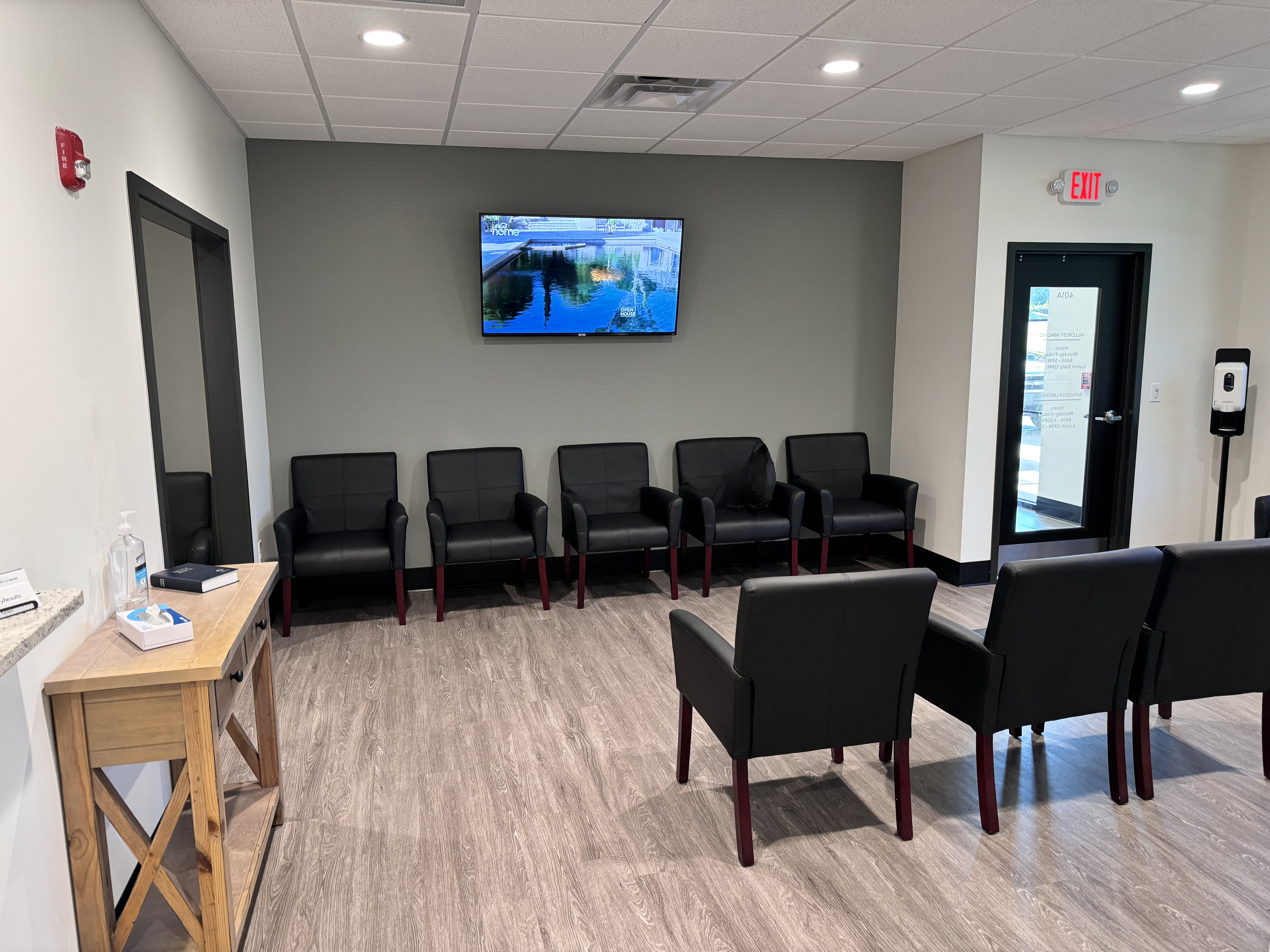
A typical medical clinic waiting room

Waiting in healthcare refers to any waiting period experienced by a patient before or during medical treatment. Waiting to get an appointment with a physician, staying in a waiting room before an appointment, and being observed during a physician's watchful waiting are different concepts in waiting for healthcare.

When a patient is waiting, their family and friends may also be waiting for an outcome. Waiting time influences patient satisfaction. Patients can spend longer waiting for treatment than actually receiving treatment.

Some experts have suggested that patient waiting rooms in hospitals be integrated with the other rooms providing patient care so that information updates can come freely to anyone waiting. Time in the waiting room has been used to experiment with giving patient health education.

In 2014 the Patient-Centered Outcomes Research Institute began funding a study for improving the waiting room experience.

Patients who are waiting for surgery depend on the availability of the operating theater, and if any patient getting treatment in that room takes longer than scheduled, all patients who are waiting to be next must wait beyond their appointed time. It can be difficult to maximize efficient use of the operating room when unexpected delays can happen and lead to patients waiting.

Waiting times for elective surgeries represent a key performance indicator for healthcare systems globally. Economic Benefits of Reduced Waiting Times for Elective Surgeries is a published systematic literature review that examines the economic value of reducing waiting times for elective surgeries across various healthcare systems. This review included studies that assessed the economic benefits of shorter waiting times for surgeries across four areas musculoskeletal, cardiovascular, ophthalmic, and gastrointestinal.

This review found consistent evidence that reducing waiting times for elective surgeries is both cost-effective and, in many cases, cost-saving. Key benefits in these studies included:

- Improved quality of life (QoL) during and after the waiting period.
- Lower maintenance costs associated with managing worsening conditions.
- Decreased mortality risks for certain procedures, particularly cardiovascular surgeries.
