= The Waiting Room (2010 film) =

- Promotional Poster
- Directed by: Maneej Premnath
- Written by: Maneej Premnath
- Produced by: Sunil Doshi
- Starring: Raj Singh Chaudhary; Radhika Apte
- Cinematography: Dilshad. V. A.
- Edited by: Baiju Kurup
- Music by: Luvv
- Distributed by: PVR Cinemas
- Release date: 15 January 2010
- Running time: 90 minutes
- Country: India
- Language: Hindi

The Waiting Room is a 2010 Indian Hindi-language thriller film directed by Maneej Premnath and produced by Sunil Doshi, starring Raj Singh Chaudhary and Radhika Apte with Sandeep Kulkarni, Prateeksha Lonkar, and Indrajith Sukumaran in supporting roles.

== Cast ==
- Raj Singh Chaudhary as Karan
- Radhika Apte as Neeta
- Sandeep Kulkarni
- Prateeksha Lonkar
- Indrajith Sukumaran as Investigation Officer
- Sona Nair as Tody shop lady
- Gopal Singh
- Shelly Kishore
- Master Ganapathi as Tea stall boy
