= Machine (2017 film) =

2017 Indian film by Abbas–Mustan

- Theatrical release poster
- Directed by: Abbas–Mustan
- Written by: Sanjeev Kaul
- Produced by: Haresh Patel; Pranay Chokshi; Dhaval Gada; Jayantilal Gada
- Starring: Mustafa Burmawalla; Kiara Advani
- Cinematography: V. A. Dilshad
- Edited by: Hussain A. Burmawala
- Music by: Songs: Tanishk Bagchi; Dr Zeus; Viju Shah; Score: Sandeep Shirodkar
- Production companies: Pen Studios; Abbas-Mustan Productions
- Distributed by: AD Films
- Release date: 17 March 2017
- Running time: 138 minutes
- Country: India
- Language: Hindi
- Budget: ₹30 crore
- Box office: ₹3.48 crore

Machine is a 2017 Indian Hindi-language romantic thriller film, directed by Abbas–Mustan. The film stars debutant Mustafa Burmawalla and Kiara Advani. The film was produced by Jayantilal Gada, Haresh Patel, Pranay Chokshi, and Dhaval Jayantilal Gada.

The film was extensively shot in Georgia. It was released on 17 March 2017. This film received negative reviews and was a disaster at the box office.

== Plot ==
Machine is a story about racing enthusiasts Sarah, the daughter of a very rich businessman Balraj, and Ransh, who meet each other. Sarah loses to Ransh at a car race event, and later finds out that Ransh, new to town, is her new classmate. As their bond becomes stronger, they eventually fall in love.

After the accidental death of Sarah's friend/secret lover Aditya, they get married. However, Ransh deceives Sarah and tries to kill her for her money by throwing her off a cliff. She is eventually saved by Aditya's twin brother Raj, who is a commando in the Indian Army. Sarah and Raj come to know the exact reason for the attempted murder when they find out that Ransh was doing all this on someone's orders and is now duping another rich businessman's daughter.

They track him down and find out that Sarah's own father had planned all this. He is not Sarah's biological father and is instead Ransh's father. They come to know that he only raised her as his own daughter for her wealth. He even killed Sarah's parents when she was a baby, and made it look like an accident. Sarah shoots him and burns him alive with the money he looted. Ransh arrives too late to save his father. Raj beats him down and hands Sarah a gun and tells her to shoot Ransh. But Sarah confesses that she is deeply in love with him and can't kill him. Ransh realizes his mistake and takes Sarah to a cliff. He tells her that he loves her too and dies by falling off the cliff. Before the movie ends, Sarah put a love lock with her and Ransh's name on a bridge and throws the key in a river.

== Cast ==
- Kiara Advani as Sarah Thapar, Balraj's adopted daughter
- Mustafa Burmawalla as Ransh, Balraj's biological son
- Eshan Shanker as Aditya, Sarah's love interest
  - Raj, Aditya's brother
- Ronit Roy as Balraj, Sarah's adopted father, Ransh's biological father
- Sharat Saxena as Advocate Kapoor
- Johnny Lever as Darpan Gopal (Police Officer) (cameo appearance)
- Vivek Vaswani as Mr. Thapar, Sarah's biological Grandfather
- Supriya Karnik as Stage Coordinator
- Dalip Tahil as Kris Altar
- Mayuresh Wadkar as Vicky Singh
- Carla Dennis as Serina Altar, Kris' daughter
- Mridanjli Rawal as Ayesha
- Simran Mishrikoti

== Soundtrack ==
Machine

Soundtrack album by Tanishk Bagchi
- Released: 24 January 2017
- Recorded: 2016–2017
- Genre: Film soundtrack
- Length: 26:25
- Language: Hindi
- Label: T-Series
- Director: Abbas–Mustan
- Producers: Tanishk Bagchi, Dr. Zeus (guest composer)

The music for the film is composed by Tanishk Bagchi, with Dr. Zeus as a guest composer of a dance number. Lyrics are penned by Arafat Mehmood, Niket Pandey, Shabbir Ahmed, Mohammed Irfan and Jasmine Sandlas. Music rights have been acquired by T-Series.

The song "Chatur Naar" is a remake of the song "Ek Chatur Naar" from the 1969 Padosan. The song "Cheez Badi" is a remake of the song "Tu Cheez Badi Hai Mast Mast" from the 1994 film Mohra,

No.	Title	Lyrics	Music	Singer(s)	Length
1.	"Itna Tumhe"	Arafat Mehmood	Tanishk Bagchi	Yasser Desai, Shashaa Tirupati	3:48
2.	"Chatur Naar"	Niket Pandey, Ikka	Rahul Dev Burman (Recreated by: Tanishk Bagchi)	Nakash Aziz, Shashaa Tirupati, Rap by: Ikka	4:00
3.	"Brake An Fail"	Jasmine Sandlas, Ikka	Dr. Zeus	Jasmine Sandlas, Rajveer Singh, Rap by: Ikka	4:39
4.	"To Hi Toh Mera"	Arafat Mehmood	Tanishk Bagchi	Yasser Desai	4:13
5.	"Tera Junoon"	Arafat Mehmood	Tanishk Bagchi	Jubin Nautiyal	6:04
6.	"Cheez Badi"	Anand Bakshi (Additional Lyrics by: Shabbir Ahmed)	Viju Shah (Recreated by: Tanishk Bagchi)	Udit Narayan, Neha Kakkar	3:42
Total length:					26:25

== Critical reception ==
Shubhra Gupta of The Indian Express gave the film 1.5/5, writing "Machine is the kind of film the director-duo would have got away in the 90s. Or maybe not. Even the squelchiest of plots need some acting chops and charisma: none of the young people, including the debutant Burmawla, is in possession of these crucial ingredients that makes a star." Rohit Vats of Hindustan Times gave the film 0/5, calling it "Worst film of Abbas-Mustan's career." Nihit Bhave of Times of India gave the film 1 out 5, criticizing the plot and the "lack of subtlety" in the film. Prasanna D Zore of Rediff.com gave the film 1 out of 5, writing "Machine is not a film in the first place -- it is a 148-minute parody that ends up possessing your mental faculties."
