= Antar (film) =

- Promotional Poster
- Directed by: Gauri Sarwate
- Produced by: Ashvini Yardi; Akshay Kumar
- Starring: Sumeet Raghavan; Tanishaa Mukerji; Apeksha Dandekar
- Cinematography: Dilshad V.A
- Music by: Apeksha Dandekar
- Production company: Grazing Goat Pictures
- Release date: 2013
- Country: India
- Language: Marathi

Antar is a 2013 unreleased Indian Marathi-language film directed by Gauri Sarwate, starring Sumeet Raghavan, Manasi Salvi and Tanishaa Mukerji in lead roles. The film has been jointly produced by Ashvini Yardi and actor Akshay Kumar for Grazing Goat Pictures.

== Plot ==
Antar is the coming-of-age story of a young Maharashtrian student in the UK.

== Cast ==
- Sumeet Raghavan
- Tanishaa Mukerji
- Manasi Salvi
- Apeksha Dandekar
- Bharati Achrekar
- Vandana Gupte
- Anjali Kusre
