= Unnodu Ka =

2016 film by RK

- Directed by: R.K.
- Written by: Abirami Ramanathan
- Produced by: Abirami Ramanathan
- Starring: Prabhu; Aari Arujunan; Maya; Urvashi
- Cinematography: Sakthi Saravanan
- Edited by: Xavier Thilak
- Music by: C. Sathya
- Production company: Abirami Cinemas
- Release date: 13 May 2016
- Country: India
- Language: Tamil

Unnodu Ka is a 2016 Indian Tamil-language romantic comedy film directed by RK and produced by Abirami Ramanathan. The film features stars Aari Arujunan and Maya in the leading roles, while Prabhu plays a supporting role. Featuring music composed by C. Sathya, the film began production in January 2016.

== Cast ==
- Prabhu as Jaivel
- Aari Arujunan as Shiva
- Maya as Abhirami
- Urvashi as Rajalatchumi
- Bala Saravanan as Bhagat Singh
- Misha Ghoshal as Sundrambal
- Narayan Lucky as Bruce Lee
- Mansoor Ali Khan as Kasi
- M. S. Bhaskar as Master Marthaandam
- Manobala as Traffic Police
- Thennavan as Keerthivasan
- Sriranjani as Vaanmathi
- Subbu Panchu as Subash Chandra Bose
- Chaams as Deal Matrimony Owner
- Sakthi Saravanan
- Vinod Sagar
- Dancer Vignesh as Deal Matrimony Assistant
- Theni Murugan

== Production ==
RK announced that he was working on a project written and produced by industrialist, Abiram Ramanathan, during December 2015 and that actor Aari Arujunan would feature in the lead role. Aari was signed after negotiations with actor Chandran had fallen through. Initially titled Ka, the team later adopted the name Unnodu Ka. Maya of Darling 2 was signed on to feature in the film, as were Bala Saravanan and Misha Ghoshal in other pivotal roles. Before production began, cinematographer Sakthi Saravanan opted out and was replaced by Naga Saravanan. The film began production from January 2016, with Prabhu, Urvashi and Mansoor Ali Khan joining the lead cast. The team subsequently moved on to Karaikudi to begin the first schedule, before heading to Chennai to work on the rest of the film.

== Soundtrack ==
Soundtrack was composed by C. Sathya.

- "Oothe" - Vaimithra
- "Kirukka" - Gowri Lakshmi, Bmac
- "Raatinam Suttudhu" - Sathya, Sriramachandra, Kateki
- "Odittanga" - Mano, Krishnaraj, Bangaramma

== Reception ==
Times of India wrote "The story by Abirami Ramanathan has scope for a better entertainer, but the flow of sequences is sluggish for most parts of the first half." Indiaglitz wrote "'Unnodu Ka' directed by RK is a film that aspires to be funny in every scene and make you leave the movie hall with the satisfaction of having laughed out of your heart. The intentions are clear. You have to forget the logic. Cinematic liberties, predictability of the script from start to end, convenient turn of events, and all characters behaving freakily.. all are there. Most of the intended jokes don't serve the purpose. But despite all these the film manages to keep you engaged and passes through as a decent light-hearted entertainer". Vishal Menon of The Hindu felt the film was "more like a blooper reel than a full-fledged comedy".
