= Yaadhum Oore Yaavarum Kelir =

2023 Indian action drama film

- Theatrical release poster
- Directed by: Venkata Krishna Roghanth
- Written by: Venkata Krishna Roghanth
- Produced by: S. Essaki Durai
- Starring: Vijay Sethupathi; Megha Akash
- Cinematography: Vetrivel Mahendran
- Edited by: John Abraham
- Music by: Nivas K. Prasanna
- Production company: Chandaraa Arts
- Distributed by: Sakthi Film Factory
- Release date: 19 May 2023
- Country: India
- Language: Tamil

Yaadhum Oore Yaavarum Kelir (transl. To us, all towns are one, and all people are our kin) is a 2023 Indian Tamil-language action drama film written and directed by Venkata Krishna Roghanth in his directorial debut. The film stars Vijay Sethupathi and Megha Akash with Magizh Thirumeni, Vivek, Ragu Aditya, Mathura, Kaniha, Riythvika, Mohan Raja, Karu Palaniappan, Chinni Jayanth, Vidya Pradeep and Imman Annachi in supporting roles.

The film's title is taken from one of the Purananuru's landscape poems, Pothuviyal 192, "Periyor Siriyor!." The film was released on 19 May 2023.

== Plot ==
The story revolves around Kirubanadhi, also known as Punithan (Vijay Sethupathi), who arrives at Father Xavier’s church in Kodaikanal, Tamil Nadu along with Jesse (Mathura), a musician from the United Kingdom. Initially, Father Xavier and everyone in his church welcome Punithan, mistaking him to be a part of Jesse’s band. However, they later discover that Punithan is not from the UK. To make matters worse, Jesse claims that she does not know Punithan and that he is not a part of her band. Punithan then reveals his story. He was born a Sri Lankan Tamil and was raised by a church priest after his parents were killed in the ethnic cleansing that occurred in Sri Lanka. The priest recognized Punithan’s exceptional musical talent and attempted to send him to the UK for higher studies in music. However, just as he was about to leave the island, the Sri Lankan army shot the people escorting him and threw him into a juvenile prison. Punithan spent several years in prison, hoping that the priest would come to bail him out one day. Unfortunately, he later learned that the priest had died in a bombing raid. After being released from prison years later, a series of unfortunate events forced him to flee the country.

Punithan joined a group of Sri Lankan Tamils who were fleeing to Australia by boat. The boat capsized, and everyone on board except Punithan drowned. Malayali fishermen rescued Punithan and took him to a music shop owner in Kerala. Impressed by Punithan’s musical knowledge, the shopkeeper gave him a job at the store and encouraged him to participate in an international music competition happening in the UK. However, Punithan faced a major obstacle: he needed a passport to go to the UK but couldn’t get one as a refugee. Furthermore, the Tamil Nadu Police were intent on labeling Punithan as an illegal immigrant and hunting him down.

It remains a mystery why they were looking to label him as an illegal immigrant? whether Punithan get a passport, and does he manage to go to the UK?

== Cast ==
- Vijay Sethupathi as Punithan alias Kirubanadhi
- Megha Akash as Matilda
- Magizh Thirumeni as Rajan
- Vivek as Father Xavier
- Ragu Aditya
- Mathura as Jessie
- Kaniha as Kanagarani
- Riythvika as Kannigai
- Mohan Raja as Vincent
- Karu Palaniappan as Arumugam
- Chinni Jayanth
- Vidya Pradeep
- Imman Annachi as Police Officer
- Rajesh as Church Father
- Sriranjani as Matilda's mother
- R. Dharshan as Adaikalam
- Bava Chelladurai as Sri Lankan Tamil refugee

== Production ==
In June 2019, the film was tentatively titled VSP 33, and the crew announced that the female lead would be Amala Paul. Later, Amala Paul opted out of the project, so Megha Akash replaced Amala Paul. Later, the title of the film was announced to be Yaadhum Oore Yaavarum Kelir. The film was shot in Thiruvarur and Kodaikanal. The film was produced by S. Essaki Durai under the banner of Chandaraa Arts. The cinematography of the film was done by Vetrivel Mahendran, and the editing of the film was done by John Abraham.

== Music ==
Yaadhum Oore Yaavarum Kelir

Soundtrack album by Nivas K. Prasanna
- Released: 2023
- Recorded: 2021–2022
- Genre: Feature film soundtrack
- Length: 8:32
- Language: Tamil
- Label: Saregama
- Producer: Nivas K. Prasanna

Nivas K. Prasanna chronology
Sembi (2022)	Yaadhum Oore Yaavarum Kelir (2023)	Takkar (2023)

The music for the film was composed by Nivas K. Prasanna. This is a second collaboration between the music composer and actor Vijay Sethupathi after the film Sethupathi. Silambarasan sang the song "Muruga" with Nivas K. Prasanna.

Track listing
No.	Title	Lyrics	Singer(s)	Length
1.	"Muruga"	Mohan Rajan, MC Sai (Rap Lyric)	Silambarasan, Nivas K. Prasanna, MC Sai (Rap Portion)	4:50
2.	"Imaithidathe"	Mohan Rajan	Malvi Sundaresan	3:42
3.	"Vaan Mel"	Kutti Revathi	Malvi Sundaresan	5:31
4.	"Aathma Nesar"	Mohan Rajan	Malvi Sundaresan	4:07
5.	"Sokkari"	Eknath	Darshana K.T., Remya Nambeesan, Lalitha, Nivas K. Prasanna	4:27
Total length:				22:38

== Release ==
=== Theatrical ===
Initially, the film was scheduled to release in December 2022, but it was postponed, and it was released on 19 May 2023.

== Reception ==
Logesh Balachandran of The Times of India gave the film a rating of 2.5/5 and wrote, "Yaadhum Oore Yaavarum Kelir harbours a relevant and significant message, but falls short in execution." K. Ram Kumar from Dinamani rated the film 2.5/5 and wrote, "The director's intention to narrate a problem faced by refugees is a good intention; he must have made it a better film if he focused on the screenplay."

A critic from Dinamalar gave the film a rating of 2.5/5, stating, "An emotional film lacks the ability to connect with the audience because of its poor screenplay." Pechi Aavudaiyappan from ABP Nadu gave the film a rating of 2.5/5, stating, "The second half of the film must have been better if the problems had been addressed in a good screenplay."

A critic from Cinema Vikatan gave a mixed review and stated that "the dialogues are written well; if those dialogues were added to a better screenplay, the film may be elevated to another level." Avinash Ramachandran of Cinema Express gave the film a rating of 2.5/5 and wrote, "For all its flaws, there is something really honest in Yaadhum Oore Yaavarum Kelir that makes us convinced that the film with a lot of unnecessary detours does have its heart in the right place."

Bharathy Singaravel of The News Minute gave the film a rating of 1.5/5 and wrote, "The film genuinely wants to make an appeal for inclusivity and connection across identities. It’s unfortunate that its ideals are let down by a badly conceived story." A critic from Maalai Malar gave the film a rating of 2.75/5, stating, "The director's effort to show the pain and life of refugees must be appreciated."
