= Saba Nayagan =

2023 film by C S Karthikeyan

- Theatrical release poster
- Directed by: C. S. Karthikeyan
- Written by: C. S. Karthikeyan
- Produced by: Aravind Jayabalan; Iyyappan Gnanavel; Captain Megavanan Isaivanan
- Starring: Ashok Selvan; Karthika Muralidharan; Chandini Chowdary; Megha Akash
- Cinematography: Balasubramaniem; Dinesh Purushothaman; Prabhu Rhagav
- Edited by: Ganesh Siva
- Music by: Leon James
- Production companies: Clear Water Films INC. I Cinema; Captain Mega Entertainment
- Distributed by: Clear Water Films INC. Captain Mega Entertainment
- Release date: 22 December 2023
- Country: India
- Language: Tamil

Saba Nayagan (transl. Hero Saba) is a 2023 Indian Tamil-language coming-of-age romantic comedy film written and directed by C. S. Karthikeyan in his directorial debut and produced by Aravind Jayabalan, Iyyappan Gnanavel and Captain Megavanan Isaivanan under the production banners Clear Water Films INC, I Cinema and Captain Mega Entertainment. The film stars Ashok Selvan, Karthika Muralidharan, Chandini Chowdary and Megha Akash, in the lead roles and Mayilsamy (in his final film appearance after his death) and others in supporting roles. The film features music composed by Leon James with cinematography handled by Balasubramaniem, Dinesh Purushothaman and Prabhu Rhagav and editing done by Ganesh Siva. The film was released theatrically on 22 December 2023, where it received positive reviews from critics and became a commercial success.

== Plot ==
In 2016 (Chennai)
Saba is drunk and gets arrested in a public nuisance case by the police. Saba pleads to get released, but the sub-inspector lets the other guy out after hearing his love-failure story. So Saba tries to narrate his love story in order to get out of the police jeep. Saba shares his school love story.

(In 2008 - Erode)

Saba is in eleventh grade and had a crush on Eesha. He tries to convey his love to her, but he can't do it, as every single attempt he makes ends in failure. He gets disappointed when he finds out from his friends that she is in love with Ashwin, a twelfth-grade school senior. Later, his friends tell him that she is not in love with Ashwin, and she just talks with him casually due to her cousin's sister's request.

In 2009
On the farewell day of school, Saba hoped to convey his love to her, but he didn't because of his friend SS. Karthik gets heartbroken after Gayathri rejects his proposal. So Saba goes with SS Karthik in order to make his friend feel better. That's the last day he met her, and he didn't even speak with her during his school days. Later, he joins an engineering college in Coimbatore, where he meets Riya, and they eventually fall in love. After some moments, he introduced her to his friend Gokul in the hope that he could pass messages easily through him to her as Gokul was studying in the same department as her. But Gokul and Riya fell in love, so Saba became single again.

In Chennai
After completing his graduation, he meets Eesha again in his cousin's sister Divya's boutique. He gives her a fifty percent offer on her purchase, and she asks him where he completed his schooling, as she thinks she might have met him somewhere, so he replies that he has studied at SVB school. After knowing he was her schoolmate, she introduced him to Gayathri. Gayathri knows him already as he was a friend of SS Karthik in school days, so Gayathri tells Eesha that SS Karthik is a rogue, so he might not have completed his college and he might have arrears. At that moment, Aravinth tells them that SS Karthik is now studying cardiology. So Gayathri gets SS's phone number, and Eesha gets Aravinth's phone number. Later, he helps Eesha's sister Preethi choose a dress for a competition with the help of Divya, which made her win the competition, so Preethi arranges a treat as she promised. After that, Eesha and Aravinth meet each other, and they become closer eventually. Eesha invites Aravinth to her house and introduces her parents to him. She tells him that SS and Gayathri are going to meet today. Gayathri gets to know that SS is not a cardiology student because he can't save a man who was unconscious. After knowing that SS is pretending to be a cardiologist, Eesha slaps him in the face. Later, SS asks Saba to break up with Eesha, so Saba records a video saying it's over between them because she slapped his friend. The next day, he happens to see her in a saree, and he gets mesmerised by her. He doesn't want to end his friendship with her. SS gets angry that he didn't break his relationship with her, and seeing Saba's phone in her hand, he thinks that she may have seen that video of Saba telling her to break up, so he tells Saba that she has seen that video. She didn't see any video, as she didn't know the password for the phone. Out of curiosity, she asked what the video was. Saba tells her about his crush on her since school days. She reveals that he should have proposed to her in school because now she has a boyfriend. After hearing these things, everyone in the police Jeep gets disappointed and asks Saba to tell them what happened next. He starts to tell them that after that incident, he joined an MBA college, and there he met Megha and how they got closer and how they became lovers. After hearing the last one, all of them got happy because Saba finally got a happy ending in his love journey. The police jeep stops, and some goons try to attack the sub-inspector, but Saba saves him. The sub-inspector thanks Saba not for saving him from those goons but for making him understand what love is. He says that in college he has five friends, two of whom are committed to the rest of the two, so the friends suggested that he fall in love with the remaining one, Deepthi. So he is going to break up with her as things are not working between them. As told, sub-inspectors broke up with Deepthi.

Finally, all of the students who studied at SVB School gather in a hall for a reunion. It was revealed that Saba deliberately got arrested in order to make the sub-inspector Vishnu realise what a soulmate is. He did that because Deepthi is Eesha. Both Deepthi and Vishnu didn't really love that they were in a relationship for their college friends wishes. SS asks Saba why he lied to them that he studied MBA and fell in love with a girl named Megha. Saba replies to him that he lied to them to give them hope, as the people in the Jeep were disappointed after hearing his love failure story. Gayathri looks at SS like she did in their earlier school days. After the school correspondent speech, everyone steps out of the hall, but Deepthi and Saba stay. He turns back and looks at her.

== Cast ==
- Ashok Selvan as SB Aravindh "Saba"
- Karthika Muralidharan as Deepthi/Eesha
- Chandini Chowdary as Riya, Saba's college lover
- Megha Akash as Megha, Saba's MBA college lover
- Mayilsamy as Police Constable M. Suseendiran
- Michael Thangadurai as Police SI Vishnu Balaji, and Deepthi's college lover
- Udumalai Ravi as Police Constable K. Balaji
- Arun Kumar as SS Karthik "SS", Saba's best friend
- Jaiseelan Sivaram as Dinesh, Saba's best friend
- Sriram Krish as Siva Prakash
- Aneessh as Naveen, Saba's school friend
- Sherlin Seth as Gayathri, Deepthi's best friend
- Jay Adithya as Nandhu, Saba's School Junior and Riya's brother
- Arun Karthi
- Viviyasanth as Divya, Saba's cousin Sister
- Akshaya Hariharan as Preethi, Deepthi's younger sister
- Dr. L.M.Ramakrishnan as Himself, Saba's school correspondent
- Balaji Murugadoss as Ashwin, Saba's school senior
- Sudhir Ravindranathan as Dharmaraj, School Maths teacher
- Manoharan Krishnan as Police Inspector, Riya's father
- M. J. Shriram as Eesha's father
- Shravnitha Srikanth as Aparna, Saba's college crush
- Deepa Balu as Nandini, Saba's girlfriend in Singapore
- Tulasi Shivamani as Saba's mother

== Production ==
The film was announced in July 2022 with Ashok Selvan in the lead. The film marked the directorial debut of C. S. Karthikeyan, who has previously worked as an assistant director of Kamal Haasan in Vishwaroopam and Vishwaroopam II. Leon James who had earlier worked with Ashok Selvan in Oh My Kadavule was signed as the music director. Filming commenced in 2022. The title was revealed as Saba Nayagan with first look and teaser releasing on 25 April 2023. The trailer was released on 25 November 2023.

== Music ==
Saba Nayagan

Soundtrack album by Leon James
- Released: 2023
- Recorded: 2023
- Genre: Feature film soundtrack
- Language: Tamil
- Label: Saregama
- Producer: Leon James

Leon James chronology
Single Shankarum Smartphone Simranum (2023)	Saba Nayagan (2023)	Laila (2025)

Singles from Saba Nayagan
- 1. "Babyma" Released: 25 November 2023; 2. "Seemakaariye" Released: 5 December 2023; 3. "Sikkikita" Released: 15 December 2023

The music of the film is composed by Leon James. The first single ''Babyma'' was released on 25 November 2023. The second single ''Seemakaariye'' was released on 5 December 2023. The third single ''Sikkikita'' was released on 15 December 2023. The song "Avalukkena" from Server Sundaram was remixed for the film.

Track listing
No.	Title	Lyrics	Singer(s)	Length
1.	"Babyma"	Ko Sesha	G. V. Prakash Kumar, Sanjana Kalmanje	4:23
2.	"Seemakaariye"	Karthik Netha	Sanjith Hegde	4:00
3.	"Sikkikita"	Ku Karthik	Leon James	3:14
4.	"All Time Happy"	Madras Miran	Arivu, Gana Balachandar	3:45
5.	"Enna Ponnu Da"	GKB	Ajay Jameson	2:44

== Release and reception ==
The film was initially slated for release on 15 December 2023. However, due to post-production and certification delays owing to Cyclone Michaung, the film was released theatrically on 22 December 2023.

=== Home media ===
The streaming and satellite rights of the film were acquired by Disney+ Hotstar and Star Vijay. The film had its digital premiere on the streaming platform from 14 February 2024, coinciding Valentine's Day.

=== Critical reception ===
The film opened to positive reviews from critics. Roopa Radhakrishnan of The Times of India gave 3 out of 5 stars and wrote "Ashok Selvan shines in this self-aware comedy that doesn’t let us take it too seriously." Prashanth Vallavan of Cinema Express gave 2 out of 5 stars and wrote "Saba Nayagan offers sporadic chuckles but it mostly grates on your patience with its idea of humour."
