= Ante Sundaraniki (soundtrack) =

2022 soundtrack album by Vivek Sagar

Ante Sundaraniki (Original Motion Picture Soundtrack)

Soundtrack album by Vivek Sagar
- Released: 6 June 2022
- Recorded: 2021–2022
- Genre: Feature film soundtrack
- Length: 30:21
- Language: Telugu
- Label: Saregama
- Producer: Vivek Sagar

Vivek Sagar chronology
Raja Raja Chora (2022)	Ante Sundaraniki (Original Motion Picture Soundtrack) (2022)	Aa Ammayi Gurinchi Meeku Cheppali (2022)

Singles from Ante Sundaraniki
- 1. "The Panchakattu Song" Released: 6 April 2022; 2. "Entha Chithram" Released: 13 May 2022; 3. "Rango Rango" Released: 27 May 2022

Ante Sundaraniki (Original Motion Picture Soundtrack) is the soundtrack album to the 2022 film of the same name directed by Vivek Athreya and produced by Mythri Movie Makers starring Nani and Nazriya Nazim. The film's soundtrack and background score are composed by Vivek Sagar, featuring seven songs with lyrics written by Ramajogayya Sastry, Hasith Goli, Chandrabose and Sanapati Bhardwaj Patrudu. The soundtrack was released under the Saregama label on 6 June 2022.

== Development ==
Ante Sundariniki marked the second collaboration with Athreya and Sagar, following Brochevarevarura (2019); first with Nani. His inclusion was confirmed with the film's announcement in November 2020.

Like his previous ventures, Athreya utilized music as a storytelling device. The music was designed with an approach of a veteran composer like M. S. Viswanathan scoring a contemporary film that has nostalgic values, referencing the protagonists' childhood in the late 1980s and early 1990s. Athreya then provided the brief to Sagar, who wanted to utilize traditional instruments to distinguish the protagonists' worlds but refrain using clichéd approaches, such as engaging a choir for a Christian family.

Sagar conceived the script as a musical film and curated 9–10 songs, but only seven of them were made into the soundtrack. From the onset, he wanted to bring an element of fusion into the soundtrack, as he did with his previous films and wanted a veteran singer to croon the "Panchakattu" song. Having a fan of Aruna Sairam's works, Athreya wanted her to sing the track. Though he was initially unsure, Sairam said that she liked the vibe of the song and enjoyed singing it.

== Release ==
On 6 April 2022, the first single track "The Panchakattu Song" was released. The second single "Entha Chithram" was released on 13 May, followed by the third single "Rango Ranga" on 27 May. The promo song was released on 6 June, along with the full soundtrack album.

== Reception ==
Sangeetha Devi Dundoo of The Hindu mentioned that Vivek Sagar "blends classical and contemporary beats" throughout the film which worked "effective". Mukesh Manjunath of Film Companion South praised the seamless transition of music being woven into the storytelling as well as Sagar's compositions, adding that:.

"Vivek Sagar's talent has never been questioned but Vivek Athreya seems to know exactly what he needs from the composer for the scenes on screen. If you really want to test this I'll leave you with an experiment. Listen to the songs and some bits of the background music before you watch the film. And record your reaction. Then watch the film and revisit the bits of the music once you can associate the moments from the film with them [...] That's because Vivek Athreya knows that music that sticks out or is noticeable might not necessarily be best for the story. 'Rango Ranga' and 'The Panchakattu' songs are woven seamlessly into the film and they truly come alive with the story."

Sagar Tetali, writing for the same website, added that the composer's "jazz, Carnatic and R&B score reflects the film's inventiveness." Karthik Keramalu of Deccan Herald mentioned the score as "gleeful". Neeshita Nyayapati of The Times of India wrote "Vivek Sagar's music is as quirky as the film, not hampering the narrative" Murali Krishna C. H. of The New Indian Express, however, was critical of the music, saying "Vivek Sagar's songs and background score don't make an impact. Had a song or two clicked, the fate of the film would have been far better."

== Track listing ==
Ante Sundaraniki (Original Motion Picture Soundtrack) track listing
No.	Title	Lyrics	Singer(s)	Length
1.	"The Panchakattu Song"	Hasith Goli	Aruna Sairam	4:55
2.	"Entha Chithram"	Ramajogayya Sastry	Anurag Kulkarni, Keerthana Vaidyanathan	5:05
3.	"Rango Ranga"	Sanapati Bhardwaj Patrudu	N. C. Karunya	2:38
4.	"Ante Sundariniki Promo Song"	Ramajogayya Sastry	Shankar Mahadevan, Swetha Mohan	4:43
5.	"Chiru Song"	Sanapati Bhardwaj Patrudu	Mano	4:42
6.	"Orori Sanchari"	Sanapati Bhardwaj Patrudu	Sachin Balu	5:25
7.	"Thera Theesindhi"	Chandrabose	Vivek Sagar	2:25
Total length:				30:21

== Background score ==
Ante Sundaraniki

Soundtrack album by Vivek Sagar
- Released: 6 July 2022
- Recorded: 2021–2022
- Genre: Feature film score
- Length: 39:24
- Label: Saregama
- Producer: Vivek Sagar

The film's 17-track score album was released on 6 July 2022, a month after its release.

Ante Sundaraniki score track listing
No.	Title	Length
1.	"Prologue – Flying Wings"	2:23
2.	"I Have a Dream"	1:25
3.	"Rekkala Gurram – The Curse of Sundar"	1:58
4.	"Leela's World"	1:54
5.	"Little Bird"	2:24
6.	"Leela Sundaram"	2:30
7.	"The Retrospect"	0:54
8.	"Fiddle Joy"	1:07
9.	"Amelia Island"	1:40
10.	"Iyam Akashavani"	0:55
11.	"The Aftermath"	5:48
12.	"Heroine Radha Ma Pinni"	1:09
13.	"Acceptance Theme"	1:54
14.	"Tha-Dha-Sthu"	5:01
15.	"The Culmination"	3:06
16.	"Epilogue – Strings of Approval"	1:24
17.	"Khandalu Daati"	3:44
Total length:		39:24

== Accolades ==
Accolades for Ante Sundaraniki (Original Motion Picture Soundtrack)
Award	Category	Recipient	Result	Ref.
Filmfare Awards South	Best Lyricist – Telugu	Ramajogayya Sastry ("Entha Chithram")	Nominated	
