= Saregama =

Indian music record label

Saregama India Ltd
- Formerly: The Gramophone and Typewriter Ltd. (1901–1946); The Gramophone Co. (India) Ltd. (1946–1968); The Gramophone Company Of India Ltd. (1968–2000)
- Type: Public
- Traded as: BSE: 532163; NSE: SAREGAMA
- Industry: Music and entertainment
- Founded: 1901; 125 years ago
- Headquarters: Kolkata, West Bengal, India
- Key people: Avarna Jain (vice chairperson); Vikram Mehra (managing director)
- Products: Portable media players
- Services: Music record label; Film production
- Revenue: ▼₹984.62 crore (US$100 million) (2026)
- Net income: ▲₹206.22 crore (US$21 million)
- Parent: The Gramophone Company Limited (1901–1931); Electric and Musical Industries (1931–1985); RP-Sanjiv Goenka Group (1985–present)
- Subsidiaries: Yoodlee Films

YouTube information
- Channel: Saregama Music
- Years active: 2013–present
- Genres: Music videos; Film trailers
- Subscribers: 62.7 million
- Views: 33.9 billion
- Last updated: May 16, 2026
- Website: www.saregama.com

Saregama India Ltd (Note: Saregama refers to the first four notes of the Indian musical scale) formerly known as The Gramophone Company of India Ltd., is an Indian music record label and content company headquartered in Kolkata, West Bengal. It is the oldest music label in India, established in 1901 as the Indian branch of the British Gramophone Company. It later became a part of EMI (Electric and Musical Industries), and for several decades, used the His Master's Voice (HMV) trademark on its releases. The first song recorded in India by Gauhar Jaan in 1902 and the first Hindi language film made in Bombay (Mumbai) with sound Alam Ara in 1931 were under the music label.

In 1985, the company was acquired by the RP-Sanjiv Goenka Group. The HMV trademark continued to be used until 2003, when the licensing agreement with EMI ended. Saregama had distributed EMI's international releases in India.

The company is involved in music publishing, film production under the brand Yoodlee Films, and the creation of multi-language television content. It also manufactures and sells Carvaan, a digital audio player pre-loaded with classic Indian music.

Saregama is listed on the NSE and the BSE. Besides its head office in Kolkata, it has regional offices in Mumbai, Chennai, and Delhi.

== History ==
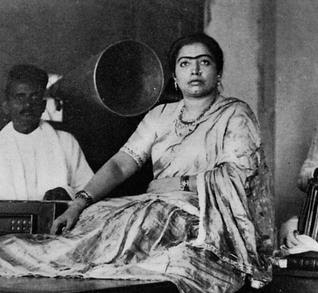
Gauhar Jaan, the first Indian artist to be recorded (1902)

In 1901, the company began operations as the first overseas branch of the Gramophone Company (later EMI from 1931), by recording the first song in India. It was incorporated in Calcutta (now Kolkata) as The Gramophone and Typewriter Ltd. The following year, Fred Gaisberg, assistant to gramophone record inventor Emile Berliner, arrived in India “on a mission to capture [its] music”. On 5 January 1902, Gauhar Jaan became the first Indian artist to be recorded. In 1907, a record manufacturing facility was established in Dum Dum, Calcutta — the first of its kind outside the United Kingdom.

On 13 August 1946, the company was incorporated as a private limited entity under the name The Gramophone Co. (India) Limited. It was converted into a public limited company on 28 October 1968, following which its name was changed to The Gramophone Company of India Limited.

From 1909 to 2003, the company retailed its music products—records, cassettes, and compact discs—under the His Master's Voice (HMV) brand, using the iconic logo of a dog named Nipper listening to a gramophone. Even after EMI sold the company to the RP-Sanjiv Goenka Group in 1985, Saregama continued to use the HMV name and symbol under a licensing agreement. This arrangement ended in 2003, when EMI divested the rights to the HMV trademark to the British retailer of the same name.

Saregama owns a music repertoire that spans film and non-film music, including Carnatic, Hindustani classical, devotional, folk, and other genres, in over 23 Indian languages. The first song recorded in India—by Gauhar Jaan in 1902—and the soundtrack of the first Indian talkie film, Alam Ara (1931), were released under the label.

The company holds the rights to a growing number of films and over 6,000 hours of television content. It continues to expand its catalogue through new acquisitions across Hindi, Bengali, Tamil, Telugu, Malayalam, Bhojpuri, Gujarati, Punjabi, and other regional languages. Its music is distributed on music streaming services including Spotify, Gaana, YouTube Music, Hungama, Apple Music, and others; on over-the-top (OTT) video platforms such as Netflix, Amazon Prime Video, JioHotstar, and ZEE5; and on social media platforms like YouTube, Instagram, and Facebook.

As of 2024, Saregama's catalogue includes over 150,000 tracks. The company also holds the rights to the complete catalogue of M. S. Subbulakshmi, the first vocalist to receive the Bharat Ratna, India's highest civilian honour. Its catalogue includes devotional music across multiple faiths—such as Hindu, Sikh, Islamic, and Christian—as well as a diverse collection of regional folk music.

In 2023, the company launched Saregama Talent, a vertical focused on artist management and promotion. That same year, it acquired a majority stake in Pocket Aces Pictures Pvt. Ltd., a digital content and influencer marketing company behind brands like FilterCopy and Dice Media. Saregama also announced a plan to invest ₹1,000 crore over three years to acquire music content across multiple Indian languages.

== Saregama Carvaan ==
Saregama Carvaan is a portable digital music player launched by Saregama in 2017. It comes pre-loaded with a curated collection of 5,000 Hindi film songs, classical music, and devotional tracks from the company's catalogue. The device features built-in speakers and also supports FM/AM radio, USB, and Bluetooth connectivity.

Variants of Carvaan have been introduced in multiple regional languages, including Punjabi, Tamil, Bengali, and Marathi. The company has also released specialised versions such as Carvaan GO—a personal audio player pre-loaded with 3,000 Hindi songs—and Carvaan Mini Shrimad Bhagavad Gita, which includes an audiobook of the 700 verses of the Bhagavad Gita along with devotional bhajans. In 2020, Saregama launched Carvaan Karaoke, which allows users to sing along with synchronised lyrics on a screen.

== Yoodlee Films ==
Yoodlee Films is the film production division of Saregama India, launched in 2017 and based in Mumbai. The studio focuses on content-driven cinema across languages and formats, with a strategy centred on digital-first releases. As of 2024, Yoodlee Films has produced 30 films, several of which have been released on platforms such as Netflix, JioHotstar, and ZEE5.

Its film Hamid won two National Film Awards at the 66th National Film Awards, including Best Feature Film in Urdu and Best Child Artist for Talha Arshad Reshi. At the 67th National Film Awards, actor Naga Vishal received the award for Best Child Artist for his performance in K.D.. The studio's early releases like Ajji and Noblemen were also recognised at international film festivals.

== Film discography ==
=== Hindi films ===
Year	Film
1981	Silsila
1981	Umrao Jaan
1981	Laawaris
1981	Armaan
1981	Saath Saath
1981	Bazaar
1981	Jyoti
1981	Ek Hi Bhool
1981	Namkeen
1981	Chashme Buddoor
1981	Dard
1981	Yeh Nazdeekiyan
1981	Fiffty Fiffty
1981	Do Dil Deewane
1982	Prem Rog
1982	Disco Dancer
1982	Vidhaata
1982	Masoom
1982	Bade Dil Wala
1982	Namak Halaal
1982	Bemisal
1982	Angoor
1982	Andhaa Kaanoon
1982	Kaamchor
1982	Himmatwala
1982	Khud-Daar
1982	Sawaal
1986	Ijaazat
1986	Karma
1986	Amrit
1988	Ram Lakhan
1988	Vijay
1988	Rukhsat
1988	Parbat Ke Us Paar
1989	Chandni
1989	Maine Pyar Kiya
1989	Jaadugar
1990s
1990	Lekin...
1990	Henna
1990	Sailaab
1990	Hum
1990	Jeevan Ek Sanghursh
1990	Haatim Tai
1990	Dharm-Sankat
1991	Lamhe
1991	Saudagar
1991	Vishwatma
1991	Jo Jeeta Wohi Sikandar
1991	Bekhudi
1991	Badi Bahen
1992	Damini
1992	Roop Ki Rani Choron Ka Raja
1992	Dil Aashna Hai
1992	Parampara
1992	Kal Ki Awaz
1992	Hasti
1992	Tyagi
1992	Jab Jab Pyar Hua
1992	Humlaa
1992	Swarg Se Pyaara Ghar Hamara
1992	Muskurahat
1992	Prem Deewane
1992	Gurudev
1992	Drohi
1993	Darr
1993	Aaina
1993	Geetanjali
1993	Gumrah
1993	Jazbaat
1993	Kanyadaan
1993	Dhanwaan
1993	Mohabbat Ki Arzoo
1993	Phool
1994	Hum Aapke Hain Koun..!
1994	1942: A Love Story
1994	Prem Yog
1994	Tejasvini
1994	Majhdhaar
1994	Rock Dancer
1994	Prem
1994	The Gentleman
1994	Criminal
1994	Akhiri Intaqam
1995	Dilwale Dulhania Le Jayenge
1995	Dushmani: A Violent Love Story
1995	Chor Chor
1996	Dastak
1996	Mr. Aashiq
1996	Prem Granth
1996	Tamanna
1996	Aastha: In the Prison of Spring
1996	Daayraa
1996	Himalay Putra
1997	Virasat
1997	Dil To Pagal Hai^{[P]}
1997	Aur Pyaar Ho Gaya
1997	Sapnay
1998	Dushman
1998	Kudrat
1998	Duplicate
1998	Zakhm
1998	Aarzoo
1998	Aa Ab Laut Chalen
1999	Hum Saath-Saath Hain^{[P]}
1999	Thakshak
1999	Kartoos
1999	Kaho Naa... Pyaar Hai
2000s
2000	Mohabbatein^{[P]}
2000	Refugee
2000	Hum To Mohabbat Karega
2000	Kasoor
2000	Gaja Gamini
2000	Khiladi 420
2000	Kurukshetra
2000	One 2 Ka 4
2000	Chhupa Rustam
2000	Love You Hamesha
2001	Rehnaa Hai Terre Dil Mein
2001	Filhaal
2001	Aks
2001	Style
2001	Ansh: The Deadly Part
2001	Deewaanapan
2001	Yeh Mohabbat Hai
2001	Pyaar Kiya Nahin Jaata
2001	Bawandar
2001	Mujhe Pyar Hua Tumse
2001	Dil Dhoondta Hai
2001	Sai Baba
2001	Yehi To Pyar Hai...
2001	Taj Mahal - A Monument of Love
2001	Khatron Ke Khiladi
2001	Muthu Maharaja
2001	Little John
2001	Aakheer
2002	Mujhse Dosti Karoge!^{[P]}
2002	Saathiya^{[P]}
2002	Mere Yaar Ki Shaadi Hai^{[P]}
2002	Dil Vil Pyar Vyar
2002	Jism
2002	Na Tum Jaano Na Hum
2002	Awara Paagal Deewana
2002	Om Jai Jagadish
2002	Leela
2002	Love at Times Square
2002	Indian Babu
2002	Hum Pyar Tumhi Se Kar Baithe^{[P]}
2002	Dhund - The Fog
2003	Koi... Mil Gaya
2003	LOC: Kargil
2003	Main Prem Ki Diwani Hoon^{[P]}
2003	Kuch Naa Kaho
2003	Paap
2003	Pinjar
2003	Zinda Dil
2003	Parwana
2003	Woh Tera Naam Tha
2003	Supari
2003	Chupke Se
2003	Police Force: An Inside Story
2003	Nayee Padosan
2006	Vivah
2016	Kahaani 2: Durga Rani Singh
2019	Ek Ladki Ko Dekha Toh Aisa Laga
2023	Rocky Aur Rani Kii Prem Kahaani
2023	12th Fail
2024	Article 370
2024	Singham Again
2024	Stree 2
2024	Kalki 2898 AD
2025	Dhurandhar
2025	Tu Meri Main Tera Main Tera Tu Meri
2026	Krishnavataram Part 1: The Heart (Hridayam)

=== Hindi non-films ===
Year	Album	Artist(s)
1990s
1987	Senorita	Suneeta Rao
1990	Dhuan	Suneeta Rao
1995	Ganga Amar Ma Padma Amar Ma	Runa Laila
1996	Mere Wattan Ke Logo	Lata Mangeshkar
1996	Talaash	Suneeta Rao
1997	Farebí	Biddu
1998	Sach Ka Saath	Trilok Singh Loomba
1998	Ho Gayi Hai Mohabbat	Aslam, Shibani Kashyap
1998	Om	Alisha Chinai
1998	Pyaar Ka Rang	Raageshwari
1998	Aira Gaira Nathu Khaira	Sunidhi Chauhan
1998	Vande Mataram 2	Lata Mangeshkar
1998	Breathless	Shankar Mahadevan
1998	Zindagi	Suchitra Krishnamoorti
1999	Y2K: Shaal Do Hazaar	Raageshwari

=== Tamil films ===
Year	Film
1998	Thayin Manikodi
2000	Kandukondain Kandukondain
2000	Alai Payuthey
2000	Rhythm
2001	Minnale
2007	Unnale Unnale
2007	Thottal Poo Malarum
2013	Aadhalal Kadhal Seiveer
2014	Salim
2016	Pichaikkaran
2017	Motta Shiva Ketta Shiva
2019	Charlie Chaplin 2
2019	Thadam
2019	Bow Bow
2020	Gypsy
2021	Aranmanai 3
2022	Varalaru Mukkiyam
2022	Naane Varuven
2023	Veeran
2023	Maaveeran
2023	Ayothi
2023	Annapoorani: The Goddess of Food
2024	Captain Miller
2024	Inga Naan Thaan Kingu
2024	Teenz
2024	Amaran
2024	Kanguva
2025	Thug Life
2025	Gangers
2025	Idli Kadai
2026	Parasakthi
2026	Thaai Kizhavi
2026	Meesaya Murukku 2
2027	Dharman

=== Malayalam films ===
Year	Film
2021	Kurup
2022	Super Sharanya
2022	Pathaam Valavu
2022	Upacharapoorvam Gunda Jayan
2022	Jo and Jo
2022	Keedam
2022	Priyan Ottathilanu
2022	Ela Veezha Poonchira
2022	Vamanan
2022	Shefeekkinte Santhosham
2022	My Name Is Azhakan
2022	Chathuram
2022	Padavettu
2022	Kumari
2022	Vivaha Avahanam
2022	Romancham
2022	Autorickshawkarante Bharya
2022	Kaapa
2022	Padachone Ingalu Katholi
2022	The Teacher
2022	Khedda
2022	Bharatha Circus
2023	Djinn
2023	Ayisha
2023	Ntikkakkakkoru Premondarnn
2023	Jawanum Mullapoovum
2023	Vaathil
2023	Momo in Dubai
2023	Bullet Diaries
2023	Pendulum
2023	Kasargold
2023	AT - Welcome to The Dark Side
2023	Pookkaalam
2023	Enkilum Chandrike
2023	Bhagavan Dasante Ramarajyam
2023	Khajuraaho Dreams
2023	Neymar
2023	Within Seconds
2023	The Great Escape
2023	Pappa
2023	Njaanum Pinnoru Njaanum
2023	Asthra
2023	RDX
2023	Padmini
2023	Nadhikalil Sundari Yamuna
2023	Antony
2023	Mr. Hacker
2023	Nadhikalil Sundari Yamuna
2023	Little Miss Rawther
2023	Philip's
2023	Bandra
2023	Kadhikan
2024	Anweshippin Kandethum
2024	Malaikottai Vaaliban
2024	Thrayam
2024	Kadha Innuvare
2025	4 Seasons
2025	Bazooka

=== Gujarati films ===
Year	Film
2025	Shastra

=== Telugu films ===
Year	Film
2017	Ninnu Kori
2017	Babu Baga Busy
2018	RX 100
2018	Bhaagamathie
2018	Chal Mohan Ranga
2019	Gaddalakonda Ganesh
2019	Vinara Sodara Veera Kumara
2021	Shyam Singha Roy
2021	Red
2021	Gully Rowdy
2021	Detective Sathyabhama
2022	Godfather
2022	Bimbisara
2022	Sarkaru Vaari Paata
2022	Ori Devuda
2022	Ante Sundaraniki
2022	Ginna
2022	Good Luck Sakhi
2022	HIT: The Second Case
2023	Kushi
2023	Dasara
2023	Ravanasura
2023	Premadesam
2023	Das Ka Dhamiki
2023	Tiger Nageswara Rao
2023	Mangalavaaram
2024	Bhimaa
2024	KA
2024	Saindhav
2024	Yatra 2
2025	Kalki 2898 AD
2025	Game Changer
2025	HIT: The Third Case
2025	Dilruba
2025	Court: State vs a Nobody
2026	Bhartha Mahasayulaku Wignyapthi
2026	Vishnu Vinyasam
2026	Godari Gattupaina
2026	The Paradise

=== Assamese films ===
Year	Film
2023	Dr. Bezbaruah 2
2025	Roi Roi Binale

== Film content ==
Films produced: Abhiyum Anuvum (2018)

== Television content ==
Saregama produces content for TV channels in Tamil, Telugu, Kannada and Malayalam. The company has created many serials and shows.

Year	Title	Channel	Language
2001	Soolam	Sun TV	Tamil
2002	Velan	Sun TV	Tamil
2004	My Dear Bhootham	Sun TV	Tamil
2005	Raja Rajeswari	Sun TV	Tamil
2007-2008	Vepilaikari	Sun TV	Tamil
2007-2012	Athipookal	Sun TV	Tamil
2010-2012	Pondadi Thevai	Sun TV	Tamil
2012-2019	Valli	Sun TV	Tamil
2012-2014	Pillai Nila	Sun TV	Tamil
2012-2017	Bhairavi Aavigalukku Priyamanaval	Sun TV	Tamil
2014–2022	Chandralekha	Sun TV	Tamil
2018-2022	Roja	Sun TV	Tamil
2019-2020	Roja	Gemini TV	Telugu
2020-2024	Anbe Vaa	Sun TV	Tamil
2022–2026	Ilakkiya	Sun TV	Tamil
2022 - 2024	Iniya	Sun TV	Tamil
2024–2026	Mangalyam Thanthunanena	Surya TV	Malayalam
2024–Present	Malli	Sun TV	Tamil
2025–2026	Aadukalam	Sun TV	Tamil
2026–Present	Siragugal	Sun TV	Tamil

=== Web series ===
Year	Title	Channel	Language
2025	Roja 2	Saregama TV Shows Tamil	Tamil
2025	Love Returns	Saregama TV Shows Tamil	Tamil
2025	Bhairavi 2	Saregama TV Shows Tamil	Tamil
