= Megha Akash =

Indian actress (born 1995)

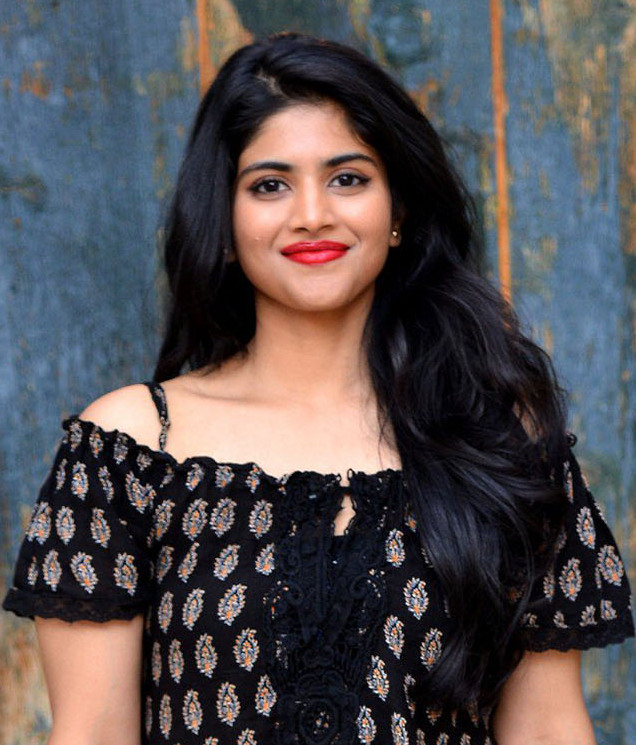
- Megha in 2021
- Born: Megha Akash; 26 October 1995 (age 31); Madras (now Chennai), Tamil Nadu, India
- Education: Women's Christian College, Chennai (BSc)
- Occupation: Actress
- Years active: 2017 – present
- Spouse: Saai Vishnu (m. 2024)

Megha Akash (born 26 October 1995) is an Indian actress who predominantly appears in Tamil and Telugu films. She made her acting debut with the Telugu film Lie (2017). She made her Tamil film debut with Petta and Hindi film debut with Satellite Shankar, both in 2019. She has also appeared in Raja Raja Chora (2021) and Premadesam (2023).

== Early life ==
Megha was born on 26 October 1995, in Madras (now Chennai), Tamil Nadu to a Telugu father and Malayali mother. Both her parents work in the advertising field. She attended the Lady Andal School in Chennai and graduated with a B. Sc. degree in Visual Communications from Women's Christian College, Chennai.

== Career ==
Megha made her acting debut with the Telugu film Lie opposite Nithiin. A critic of Sify stated, "Megha Akash is okay but her role is poorly written." The film earned her nomination for SIIMA Award for Best Female Debut – Telugu. The following year, she reunited with Nithiin for Chal Mohan Ranga. Both films were box office averages.

Megha made her Tamil film debut in 2019 with Petta opposite Sananth, though she shot the Tamil film Enai Noki Paayum Thota, opposite Dhanush before. Enai Noki Paayum Thota was a box office average, but Petta became her first commercial success and is one of the highest-grossing Tamil films of all time. Her other 2019 releases were Vantha Rajavathaan Varuven with Silambarasan and Boomerang with Atharvaa. That year, she also expanded to Hindi films with Satellite Shankar opposite Sooraj Pancholi. Monika Rawal Kukreja noted, "Megha is cute and quirky, and Pancholi and she make for a good onscreen couple with decent chemistry."

Her only release in 2020 was Oru Pakka Kathai opposite Kalidas Jayaram. She has four releases in 2021: Tamil film Kutty Story, Hindi film Radhe and Telugu films Raja Raja Chora opposite Sree Vishnu, and Dear Megha opposite Adith Arun and Arjun Somayajula. Only Raja Raja Chora emerged a box office success. Sangeetha Devi Dundoo noted, "Megha get a well-written character with ample room to assert herself and she does justice to it." In Dear Megha, she played the titular role and it was a remake of Kannada film Dia. Murali Krishna C H gave the film negative review but stated, "Megha breathes life into her character and her presence in the emotional scenes brightens up the screen."

Megha then appeared in the 2022 film Gurthunda Seethakalam with Satyadev, a remake of Kannada film Love Mocktail. In the year 2023, Megha had seven film releases. She appeared in Premadesam opposite Thrigun, Single Shankarum Smartphone Simranum opposite Shiva, Ravanasura with Ravi Teja, Yaadhum Oore Yaavarum Kelir opposite Vijay Sethupathi, Manu Charitra opposite Shiva Kandukuri, Saba Nayagan opposite Ashok Selvan, and Boo. Of these only, Premadesam and Saba Nayagan were commercial successes. For Premadesam, Paul Nicodemus stated that she "impresses" with her cuteness and acting.

In 2024, Megha first appeared in Vadakkupatti Ramasamy opposite Santhanam. She then played the lead in Mazhai Pidikkatha Manithan opposite Vijay Antony. Both films were box office failures.

== Personal life ==
After a six year relationship, On 22 August 2024, Megha got engaged to her boyfriend Saai Vishnu, son of the former minister of state for shipping of the Republic of India Su. Thirunavukkarasar. The couple got married on 15 September 2024, in a traditional wedding ceremony in Chennai.

== Filmography ==
=== Films ===
Key
| † | Denotes films that have not yet been released |

| Year | Title | Role | Language | Notes | Ref. |
|---|---|---|---|---|---|
| 2017 | Lie | Chaitra | Telugu | | |
| 2018 | Chal Mohan Ranga | Megha Subramanyam | Telugu | | |
| 2019 | Satellite Shankar | Pramila | Hindi | | |
| 2019 | Petta | Anu | Tamil | | |
| 2019 | Vantha Rajavathaan Varuven | Maya | Tamil | | |
| 2019 | Boomerang | Gigi | Tamil | | |
| 2019 | Enai Noki Paayum Thota | Lekha | Tamil | | |
| 2020 | Oru Pakka Kathai | Meera | Tamil | | |
| 2021 | Kutty Story | Preethi | Tamil | Segment: "Avanum Naanum" | |
| 2021 | Radhe | Nikisha | Hindi | | |
| 2021 | Raja Raja Chora | Sanjana | Telugu | | |
| 2021 | Dear Megha | Megha Swaroop | Telugu | | |
| 2022 | Gurthunda Seethakalam | Divya | Telugu | | |
| 2023 | Premadesam | Aadhya | Telugu | | |
| 2023 | Manu Charitra | Jennifer "Jenny" Joseph | Telugu | | |
| 2023 | Ravanasura | Harika Talwar | Telugu | | |
| 2023 | Single Shankarum Smartphone Simranum | Simran | Tamil | | |
| 2023 | Yaadhum Oore Yaavarum Kelir | Matilda | Tamil | | |
| 2023 | Boo | Malavika | Tamil | simultaneously shot in Telugu | |
| 2023 | Saba Nayagan | Megha | Tamil | | |
| 2024 | Vadakkupatti Ramasamy | Dr. Kayalvizhi | Tamil | | |
| 2024 | Mazhai Pidikkatha Manithan | Sowmya | Tamil | | |
| 2025 | Aaromaley | Sneha | Tamil | Cameo appearance | |
| 2026 | Sahakutumbaanaam | Siri | Telugu | | |

=== Television ===
| Year | Title | Role | Language | Network | Ref. |
|---|---|---|---|---|---|
| 2024 | Vikkatakavi | Dr. Lakshmi | Telugu | ZEE5 | |

=== Music videos ===
| Year | Title | Music | Language | Ref. |
|---|---|---|---|---|
| 2020 | Oru Chance Kudu | Karthik | Tamil | |
| 2021 | Thappu Panniten | A.K.Priyan | Tamil | |

== Discography ==
| Year | Film | Song | Composer | Co-singer | Ref. |
|---|---|---|---|---|---|
| 2023 | Single Shankarum Smartphone Simranum | "Smartphone Senorita" | Leon James | Adithya RK | |

== Awards and nominations ==
| Year | Award | Category | Film | Result | Ref. |
|---|---|---|---|---|---|
| 2018 | South Indian International Movie Awards | Best Female Debut – Telugu | Lie | Nominated | |
| 2019 | Edison Awards | Reigning Princess of Kollywood | —N/a | Won | |
| 2020 | Edison Awards | Best Debut Actress | Vantha Rajavathaan Varuven | Nominated | |
| 2020 | Edison Awards | Favourite Actress | —N/a | Nominated | |
| 2020 | Ananda Vikatan Cinema Awards | Best Debut - Female | Enai Noki Paayum Thota | Nominated | |
