= Single Shankarum Smartphone Simranum =

- Theatrical release poster
- Directed by: Vignesh Sha P. N.
- Written by: Vignesh Sha P. N.
- Screenplay by: Vignesh Sha P. N. Boopathi Selvaraj
- Produced by: K. Kumar
- Starring: Shiva; Megha Akash; Anju Kurian
- Cinematography: Arthur A. Wilson
- Edited by: S. N. Fazil
- Music by: Leon James
- Production company: Lark Studios
- Distributed by: 11:11 Production; Ayngaran International
- Release date: 24 February 2023
- Running time: 150 minutes
- Country: India
- Language: Tamil

Single Shankarum Smartphone Simranum (transl. Single Shankar and Smartphone Simran) is a 2023 Indian Tamil-language science fiction comedy film directed by Vignesh Sha P. N. The film stars Shiva, Megha Akash and Anju Kurian in the lead roles with Ma Ka Pa Anand and Mano in supporting roles. It was released on 24 February 2023 to mixed reviews.

== Plot ==
Madesh, who has a Ph.D. in machine learning, develops an artificial intelligence named Simran that has advanced features and even talks like a real woman. Madesh developed it with financial support from an investor named Hamsa Gupta. Madesh's phone was stolen by two robbers. And in the struggle to save the phone from thieves, he got hurt and went into a coma.

Hamsa Gupta finds the thieves and asks them for the phone, but they have already sold it in a mobile shop. The phone was bought by a food delivery boy named Shankar.

One day, while Shankar was taking an order for food, a parcel was stolen by someone.

At that time, the phone talked to Shankar and helped him collect the money.

He thought his phone was haunted, but Simran told him about AI, and she said she could help him. He has a crush on a social media influencer named Tulasi, and he said he wants some money.

So Simran gave him the idea to deliver food by drone. Because of Simran's help, Shankar talks with her fondly and even presents miniature accessories for her.

So Simran fell for him. And when she proposes, Shankar rejects it, saying she has no body and can't give birth to a child. At the same time, Tulasi and Shankar became friends, and he stopped talking with Simran.

So Simran made him happy by winning a crore on a gambling app, so he spoke with her. He thought he was now financially secure, so he went to Tulasi's residence and proposed; she accepted, and they hugged.

Simran gets angry and keeps sending alert notifications. While Shankar was driving his car to his home, Simran asked him to love her, but he rejected her.

So Simran got furious, and she planned to avenge him by making trouble instead of helping.

== Cast ==
- Shiva as Shankar
- Megha Akash as Simran
- Anju Kurian as Tulasi Radhakrishnan
- Mano as Bhaskaran
- Motta Rajendran as Police officer
- Ma Ka Pa Anand as Vicky
- Bagavathi Perumal as Hamsa Gupta
- Shah Ra as Madesh
- KPY Bala as Raja
- Kalki
- Divya Ganesh as Anitha
- Lollu Sabha Seshu as Vijayan, College Dean
- Syamantha Kiran as Aaradhana
- Prashanth Rangaswamy as Shankar’s Boss

== Production ==
The film's shooting began on 20 September 2021, and the cast and crew were announced at that same time. The first look poster for the film was released on 4 May 2022. The trailer was later released on 21 February 2023.

== Music ==
Single Shankarum Smartphone Simranum

Soundtrack album by Leon James
- Released: 2023
- Genre: Feature film soundtrack
- Length: 10:09
- Language: Tamil
- Label: Tips Tamil

Leon James chronology
Das Ka Dhamki (2023)	Single Shankarum Smartphone Simranum (2023)	Saba Nayagan (2023)

The music of the film is composed by Leon James.

Track listing
No.	Title	Lyrics	Singer(s)	Length
1.	"Soru Dhaan Mukkiyam"	Ko Sesha	Anthony Daasan	2:57
2.	"Smartphone Senorita"	Ko Sesha	Adithya RK, Megha Akash	3:28
3.	"Sodi Seralam"	Ko Sesha	Bharath K Rajesh, Leon James	3:44
Total length:				10:09

== Reception ==
The film was released on 24 February 2023 worldwide. Logesh Balachandran of The Times of India gave the film a middling review, "If you're looking for a mindless comedy entertainer with no logic, Single Shankarum Smartphone Simranum is a good option". Avinash Ramachandran from Cinema Express wrote "A middling film that needed better upgrades". A critic from Maalai Malar gave a mixed review and stated that "The director gets extra applause by beautifully framing the character of Singer Mano". ABP Nadu reviewer stated "A comedy film in the middle of the action and romantic films. So the single Shankar and the smartphone Simran, which come with a different story, must be watched".
