= Satellite Shankar =

2019 Indian film by Irfan Kamal

- Theatrical release poster
- Directed by: Irfan Kamal
- Written by: Irfan Kamal; Vishal Vijay Kumar
- Produced by: Murad Khetani; Ashwin Varde
- Starring: Sooraj Pancholi; Megha Akash
- Cinematography: Jitan Harmeet Singh
- Edited by: Chandan Arora
- Music by: Score: Sandeep Shirodkar; Songs: Mithoon; Rochak Kohli; Tanishk Bagchi; Sandeep Shirodkar
- Production companies: Cine 1 Studios
- Distributed by: Pen Marudhar Cine Entertainment
- Release date: 8 November 2019
- Running time: 122 minutes
- Country: India
- Language: Hindi
- Budget: est. ₹20 crore
- Box office: est. ₹54 lakh

Satellite Shankar is a 2019 Indian Hindi-language action drama film written and directed by Irfan Kamal. The film starring Sooraj Pancholi and Megha Akash is produced by Cine 1 Studios and SCIPL. The film based on the life of Indian soldiers, tells a story of the adventures of Indian soldier (played by Pancholi). The principal photography began on 6 September 2018, and was shot across ten states in India.

The film was released on 8 November 2019 and was a box office bomb.

== Plot ==
Indian Army soldier Shankar gets injured in cross firing at the border. Senior Officer suggests him to take 8 days rest after consultation with doctors. Shankar requests for leave instead of rest, officers agree and tell him to report to duty on the morning of 8th day. While travelling, he helps citizens and ends up missing his train. Online news reporter covers his story without acknowledging him. The story later revolves around how he reaches his home and then back to duty in a short span of time.

== Cast ==
- Sooraj Pancholi as Shankar
- Megha Akash as Pramila
- Upendra Limaye as Inspector
- Anil K Reji as Sridhar
- Palomi Ghosh
- Pardeep Cheema as Subedar Jeetu Singh
- Raj Arjun
- Sameer Deshpande as Nasir Hussain
- Chhaya Kadam
- Sohaila Kapur
- Sanjay Gurbaxani
- Yogesh Bhardwaj
- Geetika Mehandru
- Asif Basra as Cab Driver outside Railway Station
- Lijo Srambikal as Driver at accident location
- Shivani Sopori

== Production ==
The film marks the return of Sooraj Pancholi who essays the role of an army officer after 3 years' hiatus as he previously starred in his debut 2015 action film Hero. The filming began on 3 September 2018 in Kashmir and most portions of the film were shot in North India in a 60-day schedule. The South Indian actress Megha Akash was cast as the female lead opposite Sooraj Pancholi, which marks her debut in Bollywood industry. The film was shot across the 10 states of India.

== Release ==
The film was theatrically released on 8 November 2019.

The filmmakers in February 2019 confirmed that the film will not have its theatrical release in Pakistan following the 2019 Pulwama attack on the Central Reserve Police Force in Jammu and Kashmir, which happened on 14 February 2019 resulting in the death of 40 CRPF personnel.

== Soundtrack ==
Satellite Shankar

Soundtrack album by Mithoon, Rochak Kohli, Tanishk Bagchi and Sandeep Shirodkar
- Released: 6 November 2019
- Recorded: 2019
- Genre: Feature film soundtrack
- Length: 15:02
- Language: Hindi
- Label: T-Series
External audio
- Official Audio Jukebox on YouTube

This music of the film is composed by Mithoon, Rochak Kohli, Tanishk Bagchi and Sandeep Shirodkar while lyrics are written by Mithoon, Kumaar and Manoj Muntashir.

Track listing
No.	Title	Lyrics	Music	Singer(s)	Length
1.	"Aari Aari"	Kumaar	Tanishk Bagchi	Romy, Bombay Rockers	3:45
2.	"Tere Sang"	Mithoon	Mithoon	Arijit Singh, Mithoon, Aakanksha Sharma	5:09
3.	"Jai He"	Manoj Muntashir	Sandeep Shirodkar	Salman Ali	2:58
4.	"Pyaar Ka Satellite"	Kumaar	Rochak Kohli	Rochak Kohli, Amit Gupta	3:10
Total length:					15:02

== Reception ==
Filmfare gave 3 stars out of 5 and said, "Satellite Shankar meanders off course a wee bit, is melodramatic and OTT at times but its heart certainly beats for Indian armed forces alright."

=== Box office ===
Satellite Shankar's opening-day domestic collection was ₹10 lakh. On the second day, the film collected ₹12 lakh. On the third day, the film collected ₹10 lakh, taking the total opening-weekend collection to ₹32 lakh. The lifetime collection of film was ₹5.4 million.
