= Kesari Veer =

2025 Hindi film by Prince Dhiman

- Theatrical release poster
- Directed by: Prince Dhiman; Kanubhai Chauhan
- Written by: Kanubhai Chauhan; Shitiz Srivastava
- Produced by: Kanubhai Chauhan; Rajen Chauhan; Heena Chauhan; Suhraj Chauhan; Ohm Chauhan
- Starring: Suniel Shetty; Sooraj Pancholi; Vivek Oberoi; Akanksha Sharma
- Cinematography: Vikas Joshi
- Edited by: Satya Sharma
- Music by: Monty Sharma
- Production company: Chauhan Studios
- Distributed by: Panorama Studios
- Release date: 23 May 2025
- Country: India
- Language: Hindi
- Budget: ₹60 crore

Kesari Veer is a 2025 Indian Hindi-language historical action film directed by Prince Dhiman. The film is co-produced by Rajen Chauhan, Heena Chauhan, Suhraj Chauhan and Ohm Chauhan. Written, co-directed and produced by Kanubhai Chauhan of Chauhan Studios, the film stars Suniel Shetty, Vivek Oberoi, Sooraj Pancholi and Akanksha Sharma. It tells the story of Rajput warrior Hamirji Gohil, who fought against the Tughlaq empire to protect the Somnath Temple from destruction.

The film was scheduled to release on 16 May 2025 but was postponed and later released 23 May 2025. It received mixed reviews from critics, who criticized the screenplay, visual effects and underperformed at the box office.

== Cast ==
- Suniel Shetty as Vegdaji
- Sooraj Pancholi as Hamirji Gohil
- Vivek Oberoi as Zafar Khan
- Akanksha Sharma as Rajal
- Barkha Bisht
- Kiran Kumar
- Aruna Irani as Charan Jagdamba
- Shiva Rindani as Qazi
- Bhavya Gandhi as Lakha
- Mukesh Agrohari as Badri
- Meenakshi Chugh as Narmada Baa
- Hitu Kanodia as Dudhaji Gohil
- Vishwa Bhanu as Maansur
- Pratish Vora as Arjanji Gohil
- Himanshu Malhotra as Rasool
- Rahul Gaharwar as Senapati
- Birju Chauhan as Meghji

== Release ==
=== Theatrical ===
Initially scheduled for a theatrical release on 14 March 2025, the film was rescheduled to premiere on 16 May 2025. However, the release was postponed again and the film was finally released on 23 May 2025.

== Reception ==
Rahul Desai of The Hollywood Reporter India criticised the film for promoting communal bias under the guise of historical fiction. He described the film as a "162-minute slog" that robotically checks off markers of provocative cinema, labelling it Islamophobic, hate-mongering, and misinformative. Desai argued that the film uses a loosely interpreted 14th-century tale of a Rajput warrior defending the Somnath temple from the Tughlaq Empire as a vehicle to demonise Muslims in contemporary India.

Rishabh Suri Hindustan Times gave the film 2.5 stars out of 5 and criticised the VFX, song placements, and performances. Dhaval Roy of Times of India gave the film 2 stars out of 5, feeling the film was grand in scope but faltered due to inconsistencies, length, uneven storytelling, and overdramatization. Bollywood Hungama gave the film 1.5 stars out of 5, strongly criticizing the VFX as "one of the biggest culprits of the film" and labeling the film as "a poor man’s Chhaava and Baahubali."

Mayur Sanap of Rediff.com gave the film half a star out of 5, similarly pointing out its similarities with Baahubali and Chhaava aside from Padmaavat and Kesari. Sana Farzeen of India Today gave 2.5 stars and said that "Kesari Veer, despite its grand scale and star cast, fails to deliver a compelling historical drama. The film's poor execution and weak CGI undermine its potential impact." Ganesh Aaglave of Firstpost gave 2 stars out of 5 and said that "On the whole, Kesari Veer is a wasted potential opportunity, which could have turned out into an engaging magnum opus."

Alaka Sahani of The Indian Express rated 1.5/5 stars and said "The filmrelies heavily on gimmicks instead of attention to detail, nuance." Chirag Sehgal of News18 rated 1.5/5 stars and said "Despite its noble intention to celebrate a forgotten hero, the film ends up being a noisy, disjointed and exhausting experience." Devesh Sharma of Filmfare rated 2.5/5 stars and writes that "All-in-all, Kesari Veer needed better writing, direction and editing. It’s a clear case of opportunity lost."
