= Laila (2025 film) =

2025 Indian Telugu film by Ram Narayan

- Theatrical release poster
- Directed by: Ram Narayan
- Written by: Vasudeva Murthy
- Produced by: Sahu Garapati
- Starring: Vishwak Sen; Akanksha Sharma
- Cinematography: Richard Prasad
- Edited by: Sagar Dadi
- Music by: Leon James
- Production company: Shine Screens
- Release date: 14 February 2025
- Running time: 136 minutes
- Country: India
- Language: Telugu
- Box office: ₹4 crore

Laila is a 2025 Telugu-language action comedy film directed by Ram Narayan. It was produced by Sahu Garapati under Shine Screens. It stars Vishwak Sen and Akanksha Sharma in the lead. The film, released on 14 February 2025 was critically panned with it eventually becoming one of the most memed Telugu movies of the year, across social media. Produced on a production budget of ₹18 crore, the film was a critical and commercial failure, grossing over only ₹4 crore, becoming a career-high disaster for Vishwak Sen.

== Plot ==
Sonu Model is a skilled beautician who runs a thriving beauty salon in the heart of Hyderabad's Old City. Known for his impeccable makeup artistry and unique ability to transform appearances, he has built a reputation among his clients. One day, Sonu notices that one of his clients, Jyoti, looks dull, and he asks her why. She tells him that her husband Nagaraj's cooking oil business is not profitable and that improving it might require an investment of two lakhs. Moved by Jyoti's story, Sonu decides to help her by lending her two lakhs and instantly transfers the money to her account. He also tells her that they can use his photo for their cooking oil business, which may help them succeed. Then, a woman comes to the beauty parlor, claiming to be the wife of Sub-Inspector Shankar, and demands all services for free. Sonu calls Kamala, Shankar's actual wife, and informs her that Shankar's second wife has come to his parlor. The two wives fight in front of the parlor, and Shankar arrives to calm them down, but both wives leave him. Enraged at being exposed, Shankar becomes furious and is determined to take revenge on Sonu.

Khaidi, a man obsessed with Chiranjeevi's movies, is searching for a bride for his son Rustum, along with his wife Subhalekha. However, Khaidi rejects every potential bride, insisting that he wants a daughter-in-law named after a Chiranjeevi movie. Meanwhile, Rustum locks Satthi, a man who had messed with Rustum's father Khaidi, inside a goat shed after learning that Khaidi had rejected the marriage alliance. That night, Shankar meets Khalil Bhai and offers him money to cut Sonu's fingers off. As instructed, Khalil Bhai tries to attack Sonu, but Sonu manages to defeat him and his goons. It is there that Sonu sees Jenny in a nearby tiffin center and falls for her instantly. The following day, he meets her at the gym and tries to impress her. Although she is hesitant at first, she also falls for him as they meet over the next few days. Defeated, Khalil Bhai meets Rustum and asks him to warn Sonu on his behalf. However, Rustum thinks that since Sonu runs a beauty parlor, the latter might be the key to finding a suitable bride and orders his sidekick to abduct all the unmarried girls from Sonu's beauty parlor. At the same time, a lady and her daughter Sundari visit Sonu at the parlor and ask him to give Sundari a makeover to change her appearance. Sonu works on transforming Sundari's look using makeup. Just then, Rustum's henchmen try to abduct Sonu's clients. Sonu beats up the henchmen and completes Sundari's makeover, completely changing her appearance. Seeing his henchmen beaten up, Rustum rushes into the beauty parlor, where he bumps into Sundari and is impressed by her new look.

Later, Rustum and his family visit Sundari and her family, propose marriage, and then Rustum marries Sundari. Throughout their courtship, Sundari was fully covered in makeup. The next morning, after the wedding night, when she serves coffee to Khaidi without makeup, he is shocked and becomes paralyzed. Rustum's henchmen vandalize the beauty parlor by throwing stones and chase Sonu, her friend Pinky, and Jenny. They manage to escape and hide in Waseem Chacha's clothing store. There, they see the news that the cooking oil used for the wedding of Sundari and Rustum was Minar oil, which is adulterated. As a result, over 100 people fall ill and are hospitalized. Since Sonu's photo was used on the oil cans, Shankar fabricates a case against Sonu, and the police are searching for him. With no other choice, Sonu decides to disguise himself as a woman named Laila by applying makeup, wearing clothing, and using a wig. The next day, pretending to be Laila, he opens the beauty parlor. Rustum is impressed by Laila's looks during the parlor's opening ceremony and befriends her. When Rustum returns home, he tells his mother Subhalekha that he met a girl, but she is enraged and tries to attack him. Sundari intervenes, suggesting that they meet the girl in person and consider marriage if she is beautiful. Rustum's mother asks him to bring Laila so they can meet her.

Sonu (dressed as Laila) meets his old clients in a secret meeting and explains that he is pretending to be a woman only to save the beauty parlor, which is the only thing his mother Sita left for him. Meanwhile, Jyoti tries to contact someone, but Nagaraj stops her. Jyoti asks him not to betray Sonu, but he slaps her and snatches the phone from her. After meeting his clients, Sonu (disguised as Laila) drives back to his beauty parlor but is stopped by a police constable who asks for his driving license. Since there is no driving license in Laila's name, Laila tries to bribe the police, but Constable Krishna reports this to Shankar. When Laila approaches Shankar, he lusts after her and tries to flirt, but is interrupted by Rustum, who drops Laila off at the beauty parlor and invites her to his birthday party. Laila, Jenny, and Pinky attend the party. Rustum's mother examines Laila's skin and says it is not just makeup, and she likes the girl, making Rustum happy that he has found a beautiful woman. Later, Satthi and his brothers-in-law try to kill Rustum, but Laila and Rustum manage to beat them.

To find Jyoti and Nagaraj, Laila meets Shankar and offers to help him arrest Sonu if he brings Nagaraj to the location she specifies. Believing Laila, Shankar brings Nagaraj to the designated place, where, as planned, Jenny, Pinky, and Sonu's other clients abduct Nagaraj. Meanwhile, Rustum abducts Laila and takes her to a marriage hall to marry her. Shankar discovers the marriage hall and engages in a fight with Rustum over Laila. During the fight, Laila's wig falls off, revealing that Sonu has been pretending to be Laila. Later, Sonu, his clients, and Jenny prove Sonu's innocence in the adulterated cooking oil case by bringing Jyoti and Nagaraj to court. Ultimately, Rustum and his parents accept Sundari.

== Cast ==
- Vishwak Sen as Sonu Model alias Laila
- Akanksha Sharma as Jenny
- Babloo Prithiveeraj as Inspector Shankar
- Abhimanyu Singh as Rustum
- Kamakshi Bhaskarla as Sundari, Rustum's wife
- Vineet Kumar as Khaidi
- Praneeth Reddy Kallem as Pinky, Sonu's assistant
- Keerthi Chawla as Sita, Sonu and Laila's mother
- Surabhi Prabhavathi as Subhalekha, Rustum's mother
- Mallesh Balast as Waseem Chacha, cloth shop owner
- Manik Reddy as Chari
- Sunaina Badam as Judge

== Production ==
On 3 July 2024, the announcement of the film was made through a muhurtham pooja ceremony in Hyderabad. A special first-look poster of the film was unveiled during the event attended by filmmaker K. Raghavendra Rao, director Harish Shankar, and producer Venkata Satish Kilaru.

== Soundtrack ==
Laila

Soundtrack album by Leon James
- Released: 2025
- Recorded: 2024–2025
- Genre: Feature film soundtrack
- Length: 10:25
- Language: Telugu
- Label: Junglee Music
- Producer: Leon James

Leon James chronology
| Saba Nayagan (2023) | Laila (2025) | Dragon (2025) |

The film score and soundtrack album of the film was composed by Leon James, in his fourth collaboration with Vishwak after Paagal (2021), Ori Devuda (2022), and Das Ka Dhamki (2023).

All music is composed by Leon James.

| No. | Title | Lyrics | Singer(s) | Length |
|---|---|---|---|---|
| 1. | "Sonu Model" | Vishwak Sen | Narayanan Ravishankar, Reshma Shyam | 4:07 |
| 2. | "Icchukundam Baby" | Purnachary | Adithya RK, M. M. Manasi | 3:29 |
| 3. | "Oho Rathamma" | Penchal Das | Penchal Das, Madhu Priya | 2:49 |
| Total length: | | | | 10:25 |

== Release ==
Laila had theatrical release on 14 February 2025, coinciding with Valentine's Day. The film was initially scheduled to release on Aha and Amazon Prime Video on 7 March 2025. But it was later released on Amazon Prime Video alone on 9 March 2025.

== Reception ==
Telugucinema.com gave a rating of 1.75 out of 5 and stated that "it's an utter tedious effort, replete with lewd dialogues and retrogressive notions". Deccan Chronicle rated the film 1 out of 5 and called it "loud, vulgar, and terrible comedy". The Hindu cited it a "crass narrative" while stating that "stalking, objectifying women, treating them as props, and making skin colour the subject of humour – these problematic elements have long plagued mainstream cinema. Laila, however, takes them to a new low by cramming them all together and building a narrative around crude, unfunny gags".
