= Maya (actress) =

Indian actress (born 1989)

- Born: Preethi Shankar; 1991 (age 34–35); Tamil Nadu
- Other name: Preethi
- Occupations: Actress, Doctor (BDS)

Maya is an Indian actress who has appeared in the Tamil film industry. After making her film debut with AR Murugadoss's production Maan Karate (2014) in a supporting role and she has since moved on to play leading roles. Premadesam is her latest film.

== Career ==
Preethi Shankar attended SRM Dental College and became qualified as a dentist before venturing into films. She was noticed for her supporting role in Maan Karate (2014) as one of the five software professionals who befriend Sivakarthikeyan's character. Preethi then adopted the stage name of Maya when starring in her first leading role, through the horror film Darling 2. Portraying a Muslim girl seeking revenge, the film garnered mixed reviews upon release. Maya then went on to work in the romantic comedy film, Unnodu Ka opposite Aari, after the director was impressed with her stills from Darling 2.

== Filmography ==
- Note: all films are in Tamil, unless otherwise noted.

Year	Film	Role	Notes
2013	Anba Azhaga	Anjana	credited as Keerthi Shankar
2014	Maan Karate	Vaishnavi	
2016	Darling 2	Ayesha	
2016	Unnodu Ka	Abhirami	
2016	Metro	Swetha	
2023	Premadesam	Maya	Telugu film
