= Maan Karate =

2014 Indian film by Krish Thirukumaran

- Theatrical release poster
- Directed by: Krish Thirukumaran
- Screenplay by: Krish Thirukumaran
- Story by: AR Murugadoss
- Produced by: P. Madhan; AR Murugadoss
- Starring: Sivakarthikeyan; Hansika Motwani; Vamsi Krishna
- Cinematography: M. Sukumar
- Edited by: A. Sreekar Prasad
- Music by: Anirudh Ravichander
- Production company: AR Murugadoss Productions
- Distributed by: Escape Artists Motion Pictures
- Release date: 4 April 2014
- Running time: 159 minutes
- Country: India
- Language: Tamil

Maan Karate (transl. Deer Karate) is a 2014 Indian Tamil-language fantasy sports comedy film written and directed by Krish Thirukumaran in his directorial debut. The film was written and co-produced by AR Murugadoss and produced by P. Madhan under banner of Escape Artists Motion Pictures. It stars Sivakarthikeyan, Hansika Motwani, and Vamsi Krishna, with Sathish, Sayaji Shinde, Yogi Babu, Shaji Chen, Preethi Shankar, Ashwathy Ravikumar, Rajesh Gopalan, and Vinu Karthik in supporting roles. The soundtrack and background score composed by Anirudh Ravichander, cinematography handled by M. Sukumar, editing by Sreekar Prasad and stunt choreography by Dhilip Subbarayan. The film was released theatrically on 4 April 2014 to mixed reviews from critics. It was remade in Telugu as Tuntari (2016).

== Plot ==
Five IT employees – Santhosh aka "Sandy", Joe, Gokul, Vaishnavi and Nikita – meet a siddhar who has the power to grant wishes, during a weekend trip to the Chandragiri forest. A sceptical Sandy asks the siddhar for a copy of the Daily Thanthi newspaper dated on the day after Ayudha Puja (no newspapers are printed during Ayudha Puja). To his surprise, the siddhar materialises the requested copy. The IT gang reads in the newspaper that the company which they work for (Satyam Computers) would close down the next day. When this does happen, they accept the credibility of the newspaper and decide to make money through it. While Vaishnavi is reading the paper, she sees an article mentioning a certain Peter winning a boxing tournament on the day of Ayudha Puja and dedicates the prize money of ₹2,00,00,000 to the five of them. The IT gang is astounded on reading this news and decide to find this Peter and sponsor him for the boxing tournament, with the hope of getting the money.

The IT gang successfully manages to track down Peter. However, they immediately find that he is not a boxer but rather an unambitious youth who spends time roaming around with his best friend, Neruppu Kumar. However, he is in love with a young woman named Yazhini Sethuraman, who is a sports buff. To impress Yazhini, he accepts their offer to participate in the tournament. However, Peter does not show any inclination to train for the tournament and instead uses the IT gang to fulfill his own desires, including winning Yazhini's heart.

Later, the IT gang discovers that there is another boxer named Peter and he is a 15-time champion boxer, nicknamed "Peter the Killer". Thinking that they are sponsoring the wrong Peter, the IT gang approaches "Killer" Peter and offers to sponsor him, but he refuses. They reluctantly decide to continue sponsoring the initial Peter.

The boxing tournament starts, and Peter somehow manages to win all the preliminary matches by fluke. The media gives a name for his technique: "Maan Karate" (Deer Karate). Peter soon becomes known as "Maan Karate" Peter to distinguish from Killer Peter.

Eventually, Maan Karate Peter enters the final of the tournament, where he faces Killer Peter. He fears that he might be killed by Killer Peter and also fears Yazhini's rejection if she finds out he is not a boxer. He tries to avoid fighting in the final through various means but none of which are successful.

In a last-ditch attempt, Peter tries to convince Killer Peter to throw the match so that he could win and impress Yazhini but Killer Peter refuses. Peter begins to train hard for the final. Meanwhile, the IT gang defects to Killer Peter's side after being offered ₹75,00,000.

The final takes place on the day of Ayudha Puja. Killer Peter immediately gains the upper hand. However, Peter is undaunted and continues to put up a brave fight. A teary-eyed Yazhini, who has found that Peter is not a boxer, tries to convince him to call off the fight, but he refuses and fights on, eventually knocking out Killer Peter. Peter wins the tournament and dedicates the prize money of ₹2,00,00,000 to the IT gang, but they deny the offer. He also publicly conveys his love to Yazhini.

The film ends with a display of a portion of the newspaper the siddhar had materialised, torn by Nikita and left at the Chandragiri forest several months ago. The portion shows a photo of Maan Karate Peter lifting the boxing tournament trophy.

== Cast ==
- Sivakarthikeyan as Thomas Peter / "Maan Karate" Peter
- Hansika Motwani as Yazhini Sethuraman
- Sathish as Santhosh "Sandy"
- Vamsi Krishna as "Killer" Peter
- Sayaji Shinde as Kalaimamani Sethuraman
- Ravi Prakash as Fernando
- L. M. M. Swaminathan as Doctor
- Vikramadithyan as the siddhar
- Arunraja Kamaraj as Neruppu Kumar
- Rajesh Gopalan as Joe
- Vinu Karthik as Gokul
- Preethi Shankar as Vaishnavi
- Ashwathy Ravikumar as Nikitha
- Yogi Babu as Vavvaal
- Tejaswini as Nancy
- Shaji Chen as Peter's coach
- Maaran as a boxer
- Mippusaamy as Vavvaal's friend
- Soori as Tiger Tyson (cameo appearance)
- Paravai Muniyamma (special appearance in the song "Royapuram Peter")
- Baba Bhaskar (special appearance in the song "Royapuram Peter")
- Louna (special appearance in the song "Maanja")
- AR Murugadoss (special appearance in the song "Open the Tasmac")
- Anirudh Ravichander as himself (special appearance in the song "Open the Tasmac")

== Production ==
A pooja ceremony for the launch of the film took place on 10 July 2013, and it was followed by a press meet. The film was shot in Chennai, Bangalore and Athirappilly during the first schedule and a couple of songs were shot in Malta. Hansika Motwani started shooting for her portions first while Sivakarthikeyan joined the team from the first week of August 2013. The film was named after a dialogue spoken by Dhamu in Gemini (2002), where he explains that "Maan Karate" means nothing more than how a deer runs away when in danger.

== Soundtrack ==
Maan Karate

Soundtrack album by Anirudh Ravichander
- Released: 16 March 2014
- Genre: Film soundtrack
- Length: 24:52
- Language: Tamil
- Label: Sony Music
- Producer: Anirudh Ravichander

Anirudh Ravichander chronology
Velaiilla Pattadhari (2014)	Maan Karate (2014)	Kaththi (2014)

The soundtrack was composed by Anirudh Ravichander scoring for the second Sivakarthikeyan film after Ethir Neechal (2013). The audio was launched at Sathyam Cinemas, Chennai on 16 March 2014. The song "Open the Tasmac" has an alternate, edited version titled "Open the Shutter" after it elicited controversy from a welfare organisation for "misleading" use of the term TASMAC.

Track listing
No.	Title	Lyrics	Singer(s)	Length
1.	"Maanja"	Madhan Karky	Anirudh Ravichander	4:44
2.	"Darling Dambakku"	Yugabharathi	Benny Dayal, Sunidhi Chauhan	4:10
3.	"Un Vizhigalil"	H. P.	Anirudh Ravichander, Shruti Haasan	4:04
4.	"Royapuram Peter"	R. D. Raja	Sivakarthikeyan, Anirudh Ravichander, Paravai Muniamma	3:37
5.	"Open the Tasmac"	Gaana Bala	Deva, Anirudh Ravichander	4:06
6.	"Darling Dambakku Reprise Version"	Yugabharathi	Nivas, Kalpana Raghavender	4:11
Total length:				24:52

== Release ==
Maan Karate was released on 4 April 2014, in over 650 screens worldwide, which was the biggest release in Sivakarthikeyan's career to that point. The film received entertainment tax exemption due to having a U certificate in accordance with the Tamil Nadu government's then requirements for entertainment tax exemption, but this led to an advocate filing a PIL in the Madras High Court since the film did not satisfy another requirement of having a pure Tamil title.

=== Critical reception ===
Maan Karate received mixed reviews from critics. Baradwaj Rangan wrote for The Hindu, "Sivakarthikeyan, the likeable boy next door, has transformed into Sivakarthikeyan, the big star — and Maan Karate is less a film than a ticker-tape celebration of this reality...This isn’t about Maan Karate or even about boxing. It’s about the cult of the star. And as is the case with these movies, some two hours go by during which nothing seems to be at stake. And then we get the last half-hour, soaked in melodramatic sentiment, where everything seems to be at stake". M. Suganth of The Times of India gave the film 2.5/5 and wrote, "Maan Karate is nothing but a showcase for Sivakarthikeyan...[the film] dispenses with any form of logic, and wants us to take it as it is, no questions asked. The story, by director AR Murugadoss, is a mix of fantasy and romance, but Thirukumaran's script is underdeveloped".

Gautaman Bhaskaran of Hindustan Times gave it 2/5 and wrote, "Maan Karate has an interesting plot, but the way it is scripted and narrated is illogical...the movie drags you along in its sometimes strong, sometimes weak currents, interspersed with the silliest of songs and the dumbest of dances". IANS gave it 2/5 and wrote, "While the makers present the film as an out-and-out commercial entertainer and that's what it is, you still find Maan Karate meaningless because debutant Thirukumaran only tried to do justice to the hero's image by compromising on the plot. He also takes the audience for granted and gives them a film under the assumption that they will embrace it because it has been written by Murugadoss".

S. Saraswathi of Rediff.com gave the film 2/5 and wrote, "Maan Karate is a letdown by uninspiring direction". Malini Mannath of The New Indian Express wrote, "With a watchable first half and a disappointing second half, Maan Karate is an average entertainer". Deccan Chronicle gave 2.5/5 and summarised that, "For Sivakarthikeyan and Hansika fans, this movie will prove to be decent entertainer, if not a blockbuster". Sify stated that the film is "On the whole, a perfect summer outing with your family".

=== Box office ===
Over its first weekend, the film grossed ₹10.83 crore (US$1.2 million) in Tamil Nadu, and was considered by IANS to be the "biggest opening" for a Sivakarthikeyan film to that point.

== See also ==
- List of boxing films
