= Sahakutumbaanaam =

2026 Indian Telugu film by Uday Sharma

- Theatrical release poster
- Directed by: Uday Sharma
- Written by: Uday Sharma
- Produced by: H Mahadev Goud; H Nagarathna
- Starring: Raam Kiran; Megha Akash
- Cinematography: Madhu Dasari
- Edited by: Sashank Mali
- Music by: Mani Sharma
- Production company: HNG Cinemas LLP
- Release date: 1 January 2026
- Country: India
- Language: Telugu

Sahakutumbaanaam is a 2026 Indian Telugu-language action drama film written and directed by Uday Sharma. It stars Raam Kiran and Megha Akash.

The film was released on 1 January 2026.

== Plot ==
Siri (Megha Akash), an orphan who secured her job using fabricated credentials, starts working as a software employee. She becomes deeply fascinated by her team lead, Kalyan (Raam Kiran), who is widely admired in the office and on social media as the ultimate family man. Believing in his picturesque family lifestyle, Siri falls in love with him. After receiving consent from those presented as his parents, Siri and Kalyan get married.

Following the wedding, Siri moves into Kalyan's household and makes a shocking discovery: the "perfect family" Kalyan lives with and has heavily promoted is entirely a facade. In reality, the individuals living in the house are not his actual family members. Stunned by the deception, Siri begins investigating the dark secrets hidden behind his picturesque presentation to uncover the truth behind his fraudulent lifestyle, the true identities of the household members, and the reasons compelling Kalyan to masquerade with them.

== Cast ==
- Raam Kiran as Kalyan
- Megha Akash as Siri
- Rajendra Prasad as Prasad Rao, Kalyan’s adoptive father
- Rajashree as Tulasi, Kalyan’s adoptive mother
- Brahmanandam as Lavangam, Kalyan’s boss
- Subhalekha Sudhakar as Dr. Venugopal, Kalyan’s psychiatrist
- Satya as Dr. Ling, Office Physiotherapist
- Nitya Sri as Soni, Kalyan’s adoptive sister
- Ramesh Bhuvanagiri as Vicky, Kalyan’s adoptive younger brother
- Giridhar Vajja as Peddodu, Kalyan’s adoptive elder brother
- Bhadram as Bhadram, Kalyan’s office colleague
- Sree Priya Reddy as Siri’s friend
- Racha Ravi as Goon
- Thagubothu Ramesh as Sharing guy

== Music ==
The background score and songs were composed by Mani Sharma.

Track listing
No.	Title	Lyrics	Singer(s)	Length
1.	"Title Song"	Anantha Sriram	S. P. Charan, Shruthika Samudhrala	5:10
2.	"Adhi Dha Saaru"	Anantha Sriram	Dhanunjay Seepana	4:34
3.	"Dream"	Uma Vanguri	Vaishnavi Kovvuri	3:08
4.	"ABCDF"	Anantha Sriram	Sai Charan	3:44
5.	"Fake Saales"	Anantha Sriram	Ram Miriyala	3:20

== Release and reception ==
Sahakutumbaanaam was released on 1 January 2026.

Bhargav Chaganti of NTV gave a rating of 2.75 out of 5 and praised Raam Kiran's work.
