= Trivikrama (film) =

Indian Kannada film

- Theatrical release poster
- Directed by: Sahana Murthy S
- Produced by: Ramco Somanna
- Starring: Vikram Ravichandran; Akanksha Sharma
- Cinematography: Santosh Rai Pathaje
- Edited by: K. M. Prakash
- Music by: Arjun Janya
- Production company: Gowri Entertainers
- Release date: 24 June 2022
- Country: India
- Language: Kannada

Trivikrama is a 2022 Indian Kannada-language romantic drama film directed by S. Sahana Murthy and produced by Ramco Somanna. The film stars Vikram Ravichandran and Akanksha Sharma in lead roles, while Jayaprakash, Suchendra Prasad, Tulasi, Chikkanna, Sadhu Kokila and Rohit Roy appear in supporting roles. The music is done by Arjun Janya, while the cinematography and editing were handled by Santosh Rai Pathaje and K. M. Prakash.

Trivikrama was released on 24 June 2022 where it received mixed reviews from critics and became an average venture at the box office.

== Plot ==
Vikram, a middle-class guy and the son of a government servant, falls in love with Trisha, an ahimsa-buddhist girl and the daughter of a rich businessperson in Bangalore. Vikram and Trisha fall for each other, but Trisha distances herself from Vikram after seeing his violent nature. Trisha heads to Rajasthan, where her father arranges for her to marry a family friend, but Vikram also arrives there and manages to convince Trisha, who tearfully reunites with him. They head to Bangalore to seek blessings from their family. Just before their engagement, Vikram is secretly attacked and killed by Trisha's father and his goons as Trisha's father hates the alliance. However, Trisha learns of her father's involvement in Vikram's death, where she becomes a widow and cherishes her memories with Vikram.

== Cast ==
- Vikram Ravichandran as Vikram
- Akanksha Sharma as Trisha
- Akshara Gowda as Sakshi
- Shivamani
- Chikkanna as Vasu
- Sadhu Kokila as Sadhu
- Suchendra Prasad as Vikram's father
- Tulasi as Vikram's mother
- Adi Lokesh as Vikram's brother
- Jayaprakash as Trisha's father
- Rohit Roy

== Soundtrack ==
The soundtrack album has six singles composed by Arjun Janya, and released on A2 Music.

Trivikrama (Original Motion Picture Soundtrack)
| No. | Title | Singer(s) | Length |
|---|---|---|---|
| 1. | "Mummy Please Mummy" | Vijay Prakash | 4:52 |
| 2. | "Honey Bunny Feel My Love" | Sanjith Hegde | 3:50 |
| 3. | "Shakuntala Shake Your Body Please" | Nakash Aziz, Aishwarya Rangarajan | 4:07 |
| 4. | "Nenne Tanaka" | Sanjith Hegde | 3:16 |
| 5. | "Hey Sajjna" | Keerthan Holla | 2:57 |
| 6. | "Hey Hrudayave" | Rajesh Krishnan | 5:35 |

== Release ==
The film was released on 24 June 2022.

== Reception ==
=== Critical response ===
A. Sharadhaa of Cinema Express gave 3 out of 5 stars and wrote "Vikram Ravichandran and Akanksha's debut might be formulaic, but Trivikrama is definitely worth a watch, and it is a confident start for two rising talents that have the potential to make quite the mark." Sunayana Suresh of The Times of India gave 2.5 out of 5 stars and wrote "Trivikrama could still appeal to those who want the formulaic romantic storyline with regular doses of action and songs. But if you are looking for something more or different, it might disappoint." Prathibha Joy of OTTplay gave 1.5 out of 5 stars and wrote "Kannada filmmakers really need to stop what they think is playing to the gallery with these cliched lines that harp about the popularity of the star whose kid/grandkid they are working with. Trivikrama gave me a massive headache. Should you go ahead and still watch it, well, you’ve been warned."
