= Time to Dance =

- Theatrical release poster
- Directed by: Stanley D'Costa
- Written by: Deepak Dwivedi
- Produced by: Lizelle D'Souza
- Starring: Sooraj Pancholi; Isabelle Kaif; Waluscha De Sousa
- Cinematography: Rajeev Shrivastava
- Edited by: Munishwer Bharat Singh Rao
- Music by: Vijay Verma; Anamik Chauhan; Lyton
- Production company: T Films UK Limited Production
- Distributed by: AA Films
- Release date: 12 March 2021
- Running time: 113 minutes
- Country: India
- Language: Hindi

Time to Dance is a 2021 Indian dance film directed by Stanley D'Costa. Produced by Lizelle D'Souza it features Sooraj Pancholi, Isabelle Kaif and Waluscha De Sousa in the lead roles. The film was theatrically released in India on 12 March 2021.

== Plot ==
An injured ballroom dancer gets her hopes up when she meets the perfect dance partner. Overcoming her painful past, she strives to succeed without losing her heart to her new teammate.

== Cast ==
- Sooraj Pancholi as Rishabh
- Isabelle Kaif as Isha
- Waluscha De Sousa as Meher
- Saqib Saleem as Navdeep Singh
- Rajpal Yadav as Sada
- Natasha Powell as William' mother
- Guru Randhawa as himself in the song Munde Mar Gaye (special appearance)
- Martin Rycroft as William

== Production ==
=== Development ===
Stanley D'Costa's directional debut portrays Sooraj Pancholi as a street dancer and Isabelle Kaif as a ballroom Latin dancer. The training for the Latin ballroom dances for the lead actors is done by Sneh Vadhani.

=== Filming ===
Film's pre-production began in March 2018, and principal photography commenced at London in June 2018.

== Soundtrack ==
Time to Dance

Soundtrack album by Rochak Kohli, Vishal Mishra, Guru Randhawa — Vee, Gurinder Seagal and Vijay Verma
- Released: 20 March 2021
- Genre: Feature film soundtrack
- Length: 34:50
- Language: Hindi
- Label: T-Series

Official audio
- Time To Dance - Full Album on YouTube

The film's music was composed by Rochak Kohli, Vishal Mishra, Guru Randhawa — Vee, Gurinder Seagal and Vijay Verma while the lyrics were written by Kumaar, Kunaal Vermaa, Guru Randhawa, Geet Sagar, Rajesh Manthan, Neha Karode and Amrita Talukder.

Track listing
No.	Title	Lyrics	Music	Singer(s)	Length
1.	"Aaye Haaye"	Kumaar	Vishal Mishra	Vishal Mishra, Millind Gaba, Aditi Singh Sharma	2:47
2.	"Baby! Tu Na Jaa"	Kunaal Vermaa	Gurinder Seagal	Gurinder Seagal, Jonita Gandhi	4:19
3.	"Thok De Killi"	Kumaar	Rochak Kohli	Navraj Hans	3:10
4.	"Time To Dance - Title Track"	Kumaar	Vishal Mishra	Vishal Mishra, Neeti Mohan	5:20
5.	"Munde Mar Gaye"	Guru Randhawa	Guru Randhawa — Vee	Guru Randhawa	2:45
6.	"Get Down To Groove"	Geet Sagar	Vijay Verma	Shivang Upadhyay, Geet Sagar, Neha Karode	2:37
7.	"Hathon Se Yoon"	Rajesh Manthan	Vijay Verma	Raja Hasan	4:33
8.	"I Saw You"	Neha Karode	Vijay Verma	Neha Karode	0:50
9.	"We Are One"	Geet Sagar	Vijay Verma	Geet Sagar	0:51
10.	"You Become Me"	Geet Sagar	Vijay Verma	Geet Sagar	0:52
11.	"Common Dance"	Amrita Talukder, Geet Sagar	Vijay Verma	Amrita Talukder, Geet Sagar	0:42
12.	"Tender Touch"	Geet Sagar	Vijay Verma	Geet Sagar	1:07
13.	"Re Sara"	Geet Sagar	Vijay Verma	Geet Sagar	1:27
14.	"Now I Know"	Geet Sagar	Vijay Verma	SKD	1:21
15.	"Spanish Big Drums" (Instrumental Theme)	—	Vijay Verma	—	2:08
Total length:					34:50
