= Neeraja Kona =

Indian film director, Writer & costume designer

- Born: 29 April 1983 (age 43); Bapatla, Andhra Pradesh, India
- Occupations: Stylist, Costume Designer, Lyricist, Director
- Years active: 2012–present
- Spouse: Ajay
- Parent: Kona Raghupathi
- Relatives: Kona Venkat

Neeraja Kona (born 29 April 1983) is an Indian stylist, costume designer, lyricist and director who works in Telugu and Tamil films.

== Career ==
Neeraja began her career assisting in styling Jr NTR and Kajal Aggarwal for Baadshah (2013), directed by Srinu Vaitla. She was Nithiin's stylist for Gunde Jaari Gallanthayyinde. Nithiin then signed her on for his next two movies Courier Boy Kalyan and Puri Jagannadh's Heart Attack. She later met Samantha Ruth Prabhu, and became her personal stylist.

Early on in her career, Neeraja got to be part of Trivikram Srinivas and Pawan Kalyan's Attarintiki Daredi and Harish Shankar's Ramayya Vasthavayya. She designed costumes for Samantha Ruth Prabhu in both films. She has worked with the directors Vamsi Paidipally, and V. V. Vinayak. Her other projects include Hansika's Romeo and Juliet, Gopichand Malineni's Pandaga Chesko, Krishna Vamsi's Govindudu Andarivadele, and Karunakaran's movie. She has also assisted in styling Allu Arjun and Kajal Aggarwal in Yevadu, Nithiin and Yami Gautam in Courier Boy Kalyan, Samantha Ruth Prabhu and Pranitha Subhash in Jr NTR - Santosh Srinivas's project and Sudheer Babu in two songs from Aadu Magaadra Bujji. She was also a lyricist for few songs in the films Thikka, Chal Mohan Ranga and Miss India which are composed by S.S.Thaman.

Her debut directorial feature film, Telusu Kada featuring Siddhu Jonnalagadda, was released on 17 October 2025.

== Filmography ==
=== As a Costume Designer ===
Year	Film	Language	Notes
2013	Aadu Magaadra Bujji	Telugu	
2013	Autonagar Surya	Telugu	
2013	Ramayya Vasthavayya	Telugu	
2013	Attarintiki Daredi	Telugu	
2013	Heart Attack	Telugu	
2013	Courier Boy Kalyan	Telugu	
2013	Gunde Jaari Gallanthayyinde	Telugu	
2013	Baadshah	Telugu	
2014	Alludu Seenu	Telugu	
2014	Rabhasa	Telugu	
2014	Power	Telugu	
2014	Oka Laila Kosam	Telugu	
2014	Govindudu Andarivadele	Telugu	
2015	Pandaga Chesko	Telugu	
2016	Babu Bangaram	Telugu	
2016	Iru Mugan	Tamil	"Halena" song only
2017	Mersal	Tamil	
2017	Ninnu Kori	Telugu	
2017	Theeran Adhigaaram Ondru	Tamil	
2017	Velaikkaran	Tamil	
2018	Thaanaa Serndha Koottam	Tamil	
2018	Irumbu Thirai	Tamil	
2018	Saamy Square	Tamil	
2019	NGK	Tamil	

=== As a lyricist ===
Year	Film	Song
2016	Thikka	"Vellipoke"
2018	Chal Mohan Ranga	"Miami"
2020	Miss India	"Naa Chinni Lokkammea"

=== As a Director ===
Key
†	Denotes films that have not yet been released

Year	Film	Notes	Ref
2025	Telusu Kada	Debut as feature film director	
