= Tera Yaar Hoon Main (film) =

2026 Indian film by Milap Zaveri

- Theatrical release poster
- Directed by: Milap Zaveri
- Screenplay by: Rajan Agarwal; Milap Zaveri
- Story by: Prasanna Kumar Bezawada
- Produced by: Ajay Murdia; Bina Indra Kumar; Manish Singhal
- Starring: Aman Indra Kumar; Akanksha Sharma; Paresh Rawal; Johnny Lever; Supriya Pilgaonkar; Mrinal Kulkarni
- Cinematography: Nigam Bomzan
- Edited by: Sanjay Sankla; Maahir Zaveri
- Music by: Payal - Aditya; Meet Bros; Anand Raaj Anand; Sanjeev Darshan
- Production companies: Camera Take Films; Mumbai Films; BIK Productions; Enterr10 Television
- Distributed by: PVR Inox Pictures
- Release date: 24 July 2026
- Running time: 146 minutes
- Country: India
- Language: Hindi

Tera Yaar Hoon Main is a 2026 Indian Hindi-language action romantic-comedy film directed by Milap Zaveri. It stars Aman Indra Kumar and Akanksha Sharma in the lead roles. The film marks the acting debut of Aman Indra Kumar and is produced by Milap Zaveri and Bina Indra Kumar. The film has released theatrically on 24 July 2026.

== Plot ==
Sanju, a cheerful and laid‑back young man from Nagpur, spends his days with his mother Saru and a close circle of friends. Although he is reluctant to leave his hometown, he eventually agrees to move to Mumbai at his mother's urging, so that he can secure a decent job. He is put up at the home of Vishwanath Purohit, a long‑time friend of Saru's. On the train journey to Mumbai, Sanju crosses paths with Anu, a young woman who openly disparages Nagpur boys, leading to an awkward and embarrassing encounter between the two.

Upon arriving in Mumbai, Sanju discovers that Anu is none other than Vishwanath's daughter, and he is expected to stay under the same roof and drive her to college each morning. Anu initially holds a strong grudge against Sanju, but her opinion gradually softens as she witnesses his genuine kindness and devotion to his family. The two become close companions. Sanju also comes to know about Vishwanath's steadfast reputation for honouring every promise he makes – a trait that once led him to sacrifice Anu's dream of becoming a doctor in order to fulfill a commitment made to a dying friend.

Meanwhile, Sanju begins a romantic relationship with a colleague named Tanisha. However, when Tanisha proposes marriage, Sanju realises that his true feelings lie elsewhere – he has fallen deeply in love with Anu. Before he can express his emotions to her, Vishwanath arranges Anu's engagement to Aditya, leaving Sanju devastated. Over time, Sanju and Vishwanath develop a strong friendship, and Vishwanath pledges to remain Sanju's friend for as long as he stays in Mumbai. Sanju eventually confesses his love for Anu to Vishwanath, placing the older man in a painful dilemma: he must honour his word to Sanju and support his quest for Anu's affection, while at the same time protecting his daughter and discouraging Sanju's advances.

In the ensuing emotional turmoil, Anu reveals that she too has loved Sanju all along and begs him to elope with her. Vishwanath, frustrated by the entire situation, angrily tells Sanju to take her away and marry her. Yet on the day of Anu's wedding, Vishwanath is stunned to find Anu still at home, while Sanju has departed. Sanju explains that he chose to leave because he could not bear to embarrass or hurt Vishwanath, and because he ultimately trusts Vishwanath's judgment as a father. Soon afterwards, Vishwanath arrives in Nagpur with Anu and gladly gives the couple his blessing, convinced that Sanju will bring Anu lasting happiness.

== Cast ==
- Aman Indra Kumar as Sanju
- Akanksha Sharma as Anu
- Paresh Rawal as Vishwanath Purohit
- Johnny Lever as a Cab Driver
- Supriya Pilgaonkar as Nandini
- Mrinal Kulkarni Saru
- Neha Khan as Tanisha
- Pooja Katurde
- Anand Acharya
- Darshan Jariwala as Tanisha's father
- Milap Zaveri as guest at Nagpur wedding (cameo appearance)

== Production ==
The film is produced by Ajay Murdia, Bina Indra Kumar, and Manish Singhal, with Subhash Kale as co-producer. It is presented by Ajay Murdia in association with Mumbai Films, BIK Productions, and Enter10 Television, under the Camera Take Films banner. The launch event was held in November 2024, attended by Aamir Khan and Ajay Devgn.

Aman Indra Kumar is the son of director Indra Kumar. Zaveri stated that Kumar earned his debut through his own work, not his father's legacy, and that he had been impressed by Kumar's acting and dance videos. Kumar had recreated scenes from Simmba and PK for his showreel. Zaveri also said that Akanksha Sharma was confirmed after one screen test.

Shooting commenced in November 2024. By December 2024, the makers reported that approximately 60 percent of the shoot was complete. The film was shot in a single schedule, with plans to wrap up by the end of January 2025..

== Soundtrack ==
Tera Yaar Hoon Main

Soundtrack album by Payal Dev, Aditya Dev, Kunaal Vermaa and Sachet Tandon
- Released: 27 July 2026
- Recorded: 2026
- Genre: Feature film soundtrack
- Length: 21:28
- Language: Hindi
- Label: Zee Music Company

Official audio
- Tera Yaar Hoon Main - Full Album on YouTube

The title track was composed by Payal Dev and Aditya Dev, with lyrics by Kunaal Vermaa. It is sung by Sachet Tandon and Payal Dev.

Track listing
No.	Title	Lyrics	Music	Singer(s)	Length
1.	"Tera Yaar Hoon Main – Title Track"	Kunaal Vermaa	Payal Dev, Aditya Dev	Sachet Tandon, Payal Dev,	2:50
2.	"Tum Hi Se Pyaar"	Kunaal Vermaa	Payal Dev, Aditya Dev	Jubin Nautiyal	3:00
3.	"Maine Dil Tujhko Diya"	I Kumar	Sanjeev Darshan	Nakash Aziz	2:51
4.	"Friend Friend"	Kumaar	Meet Bros, Nasir	Meet Bros Feat: Khushboo Grewal	3:41
5.	"Ladki Ke Daddy"	Anand Raaj Anand	Anand Raaj Anand	Udit Narayan, Aditya Narayan	3:30
6.	"Hai Mere Bappa"	Kumaar	Sanjeev Darshan	Darshan Rathod, Piyush Ranjan	2:04
Total length:					21:28

== Release ==
The film is scheduled for theatrical release on 24 July 2026. It was previously scheduled for 22 May 2026 and 31 July 2026. The film releases a week after The Odyssey and a week before Spider-Man: Brand New Day. Zaveri stated that no major Hindi film was releasing on that date.

The makers opted against pre-release interviews or promotional events featuring the lead actors. Zaveri said they wanted to keep the mystery intact and let the content of the film do the talking.

== Reception ==
Abhishek Srivastava of The Times of India gave the film 2 out of 5 stars. He wrote that the film "tests your patience with a predictable story, average performances, and a plot so thin that it never finds any real momentum". Srivastava noted that Kumar "struggles to make an impression" with expressions that "rarely feel natural" and dialogue delivery that "often lacks conviction", while Sharma "fares a little better" but has "very little to work with" due to weak writing. He added that Rawal "gives the film whatever warmth it has". Bollywood Hungama review gave the film 2 out of 5 stars. The review stated that Kumar "shows promise and does well, especially in emotional and confrontational sequences" but "could do better in comic scenes", while Sharma "has an arresting presence and delivers a first-rate performance". Rawal was described as "the soul of the film". The review concluded that the film's "dated narrative, weak humour and unconvincing plot points dilute the impact".

Mayur Sanap of Rediff.com gave the film a negative review, writing that debutant Kumar "simply has no screen presence or charisma". He noted that Rawal "does what he can, but there is only so much anyone can do with material this weak", and that Pilgaonkar is "saddled with painfully outdated humour". He described the film as "stretched to two-and-a-half hours that throw action, romance, comedy, drama and emotion at us, hoping something sticks. Sadly, nothing does." Satish Sundaresan of The Free Press Journal gave the film 2 out of 5 stars. He wrote that Kumar "fails to live up to" expectations and "ends up looking and acting like a Gen Z version of Uday Chopra", while Sharma "shows promise in some scenes" but "needs to sharpen her acting skills". Sundaresan also stated that the director "fails to develop" the screenplay into a compelling film, and that the film "lacks the spunk and effervescence expected of a romantic film or even a rom-com".
