= Miss India (2020 film) =

2020 film by Narendra Nath Yaddanapudi

- Official release poster
- Directed by: Narendra Nath
- Written by: Narendra Nath
- Produced by: Mahesh S. Koneru
- Starring: Keerthy Suresh; Jagapathi Babu
- Cinematography: Dani Sanchez-Lopez; Sujith Vaassudev
- Edited by: Tammiraju
- Music by: S. Thaman
- Production company: East Coast Productions
- Distributed by: Netflix
- Release date: 4 November 2020
- Running time: 138 minutes
- Country: India
- Language: Telugu

Miss India is a 2020 Indian Telugu-language business drama film written and directed by Narendra Nath. It stars Keerthy Suresh and Jagapathi Babu, while Rajendra Prasad, Naresh, Nadhiya, and Naveen Chandra play supporting roles. The plot follows Manasa Samayuktha (Keerthy Suresh), a girl from a middle-class South Indian family, who dreams of having her tea business in the US. The film received negative reviews.

The film was produced by Mahesh S. Koneru under East Coast Productions. Dani Sanchez-Lopez and Sujith Vaassudev handled the cinematography, while S. Thaman composed the music. The film was planned to be released on 17 April 2020 was postponed due to the COVID-19 pandemic. The film was released on Netflix on 4 November 2020 in Telugu along with dubbed versions in Tamil and Malayalam.

== Plot ==
Manasa Samyuktha, a woman with big goals from a middle-class family, moves to the US after her brother Arjun gets a job there. She dreams of setting up her own tea business in the US as promised to her late grandfather Dr. Vishwanath and to continue his legacy, but her family does not agree due to the risks involved in running a business. Manasa leaves home after a fight with her mother and brother after turning down Vijay Anand's marriage proposal.

Manasa meets Vikram, a venture capitalist, and pitches her business idea. Vikram is impressed and invests in Manasa’s business. Manasa opens her first tea café named “Miss India” in the US along with her friends and attains popularity quickly. Over time, she expands the outlets to other parts of the US. This angers Kailash Sivakumar (KSK), who owns a chain of coffee shops in the US. KSK does not like women growing in business, and he views Manasa’s tea business as a serious threat to his coffee shops. He waits for an opportunity to destroy Manasa’s business.

Padma, one of Manasa’s friends, brings a new business deal for Miss India, where they need to supply a large quantity of tea ingredients for a retailer in the US, but only on a credit basis. Manasa decides to take the risk by accepting the offer much against Vikram’s advice. However, after a few weeks, Manasa realizes that the retailer has deferred the payment and she has been cheated, leading to a cash crunch at Miss India. Manasa finds that Padma is the traitor and goes to meet her. Padma reveals that she did this on KSK’s orders in return for a large sum of money. However, Manasa has a hidden camera, which she uses to record Padma’s confession and release it to the media.

Manasa requests the public to financially help her and promises that each person helping her would be a shareholder in Miss India. She receives a good amount of money from the public and revives her business. In the end, KSK ends up bankrupt.

== Cast ==
- Keerthy Suresh as Manasa Samyuktha
- Jagapathi Babu as Kailash Sivakumar a.k.a. KSK
- Rajendra Prasad as Dr. Vishwanath, Manasa, Sahana, and Arjun's grandfather
- Naresh as Sivarama Krishna, Manasa, Sahana, and Arjun's father
- Nadhiya as Kamala, Manasa, Sahana, and Arjun's mother
- Naveen Chandra as Vijay Anand, Manasa's former love interest
- Kamal Kamaraju as Arjun Chaitanya, Manasa's elder brother
- Bhanu Sri Mehra as Sahana, Manasa's elder sister
- Sumanth Shailendra as Vikram, Manasa's business partner
- Pujita Ponnada as Padma Nayana, Manasa's classmate and deceiver
- Divya Sripada as Preethi, Manasa's friend
- Praveen as Bijju, an employee in Miss India

== Soundtrack ==
Miss India

Soundtrack album by S. Thaman
- Released: 2 November 2020
- Recorded: 2019
- Genre: Feature film soundtrack
- Length: 11:05
- Label: Aditya Music
- Producer: S. Thaman

S. Thaman chronology
Disco Raja (2020)	Miss India (2020)	Solo Brathuke So Better (2020)

Singles from Miss India
- 1. "Kotthaga Kotthaga" Released: 7 February 2020; 2. "Lacha Gummadi" Released: 28 October 2020; 3. "Theme of Miss India" Released: 29 October 2020

The music is composed by S. Thaman and released by Aditya Music. The first single, "Kotthaga Kotthaga" written by Kalyan Chakravarthi and sung by Shreya Ghoshal and S. Thaman, was released on 7 February 2020. The next single "Lacha Gummadi" was sung by Srivardhini and released on 28 October 2020. The third single "Theme of Miss India" was sung by Harika Narayan and Sruthi Ranjani and was released on 29 October 2020. The album was released on 2 November 2020.

Track list
No.	Title	Lyrics	Singer(s)	Length
1.	"Kotthaga Kotthaga"	Kalyan Chakravarthi	Shreya Ghoshal, S. Thaman	3:23
2.	"Lacha Gummadi"	Kalyan Chakravarthi	Srivardhini	3:53
3.	"Theme of Miss India"	Kalyan Chakravarthi	Harika Narayan, Sruthi Ranjani	3:49
4.	"Naa Chinni Lokkammea"	Neeraja Kona	Aditi Bhavaraju, Ramya Behara, Sri Krishna	3:53
Total length:				14:58

== Release ==
The film was released on Netflix on 4 November 2020 in Telugu along with dubbed versions in Tamil and Malayalam Languages.

== Reception ==
The film received mixed-to-negative reviews, with criticism for various contrivances and plot inconsistencies, poor dialogue and characterization, and a lack of understanding of misogyny. Sowmya Rajendran of The News Minute wrote, "With its constant reminders about the goodness of tea, Miss India feels like a two hour advertisement for chai. But one is not sure about the messaging because by the time it draws to a clumsy end, you feel the need for a much stronger beverage." Sudhir Srinivasan of Cinema Express gave the film 1.5/5 stars.
