= Velaiilla Pattadhari (soundtrack) =

2014 soundtrack album by Anirudh Ravichander

- Album cover

Soundtrack album by Anirudh Ravichander
- Released: 14 February 2014
- Recorded: 2013–2014
- Genre: Feature film soundtrack
- Length: 25:20
- Language: Tamil
- Label: Wunderbar Studios; Divo
- Producer: Anirudh Ravichander; Dhanush

Anirudh Ravichander chronology
Vanakkam Chennai (2013)	Velaiilla Pattadhari (2014)	Maan Karate (2014)

Velaiilla Pattadhari popularly referred to as VIP, is the soundtrack album, composed by Anirudh Ravichander of the 2014 Tamil film of the same name starring Dhanush. This film marks the second collaboration of Anirudh with Dhanush, after his debut film 3 (2012). The film's soundtrack was launched on 14 February 2014 to positive response from critics and audiences.

== Production ==
Anirudh Ravichander's inclusion was confirmed during mid-July 2013 and by August, he had completed recording for two of the tracks. The soundtrack album featured eight songs, and lyrics for all the tracks were written by Dhanush. Both Anirudh and Dhanush had crooned the vocals for all of the tracks. Veteran playback singer S. Janaki recorded for "Amma Amma" along with Dhanush; her first song after a decade. Initially, the song "Udhungada Sangu" was not composed for the film. In 2017, he recalled about the song situation at the annual cultural festival Saarang held in IIT Madras, the tune was composed at his home after he met his former girlfriend at the bar. That song eventually was included in this film. The film's album was scheduled to be released in January 2014 but was delayed after Anirudh having to work on two additional songs. The final mix of the songs were completed in mid-January. By June, he began working on the film score.

== Marketing and release ==
The music rights were acquired by Dhanush's newly formed music label Wunderbar Studios, a subsidiary of the production company Wunderbar Films, along with Divo, a newly formed digital streaming portal which is their first venture. The tracklist was unveiled on 10 February 2014, and the album launched on 14 February 2014 (Valentine's Day) at the Suryan FM station in Chennai with Dhanush, Amala Paul and Anirudh Ravichander in attendance. Anirudh promoted the album on Sun Music on 11 July 2014, a week before the film's release.

== Track listing ==
All lyrics are written by Dhanush.

No.	Title	Singer(s)	Length
1.	"Velaiilla Pattadhari"	Anirudh Ravichander	3:56
2.	"Amma Amma"	Dhanush, S. Janaki	5:04
3.	"Po Indru Neeyaga"	Dhanush, Anirudh Ravichander	3:43
4.	"What a Karavad"	Dhanush, Anirudh Ravichander	4:27
5.	"Ey Inga Paaru"	Anirudh Ravichander	1:56
6.	"Udhungada Sangu"	Anirudh Ravichander	3:29
7.	"Sunrise Theme"	Instrumental	1:07
8.	"Smiling with the Pain Theme"	Instrumental	1:28
Total length:			25:20

== Reception ==
=== Critical reception ===
Srinivasa Ramanujam of The Times of India gave the album 3 out of 5 stars, saying that some of the songs sounded similar to Anirudh's previous compositions. He criticised the use of only two male singers (Dhanush and Anirudh), stating that "other voices might have provided a fresher musical perspective to some of the tunes". Karthik Srinivasan of Milliblog called it as a "fun musical outing by Anirudh and Dhanush". Anupama Subramanian of Deccan Chronicle wrote "Anirudh in the combo of Dhanush has created the musical magic both in songs as well background score once again." Haricharan Pudipeddi of IANS wrote "Anirudh's music is an added bonus for the film, especially the title track. Dhanush proves he's multi-talented by writing and singing most of the songs, giving the film a personal touch."

Malini Mannath of The New Indian Express wrote "Anirudh’s songs are youthful and catchy, his background score complementing the feel." S. Saraswathi of Rediff.com wrote "Composer Anirudh, of Kolaveri fame, has created magic once again for Dhanush. Almost every track in the film is a rage among youngsters. The What a Karavad number sung by both Dhanush and Anirudh had the entire theater on its feet, while Amma Amma, sung by Dhanush and S Janaki, is moving." Avinash Ramachandran of The Indian Express noted that "[Velaiilla Pattadhari] was an out-and-out commercial cinema that had space for not just songs, but mass theme music pieces that gets played when the hero walks in slow-motion, flips his hair, and looks at the camera with a smirk [...] The VIP theme music continues to be the ringtone of many".

Upon release, the album eventually topped the iTunes charts, becoming his fourth consecutive album to do so.

=== Awards and nominations ===
Award	Date of ceremony (Note: Date is linked to the article about the awards held that year, wherever possible.)	Category	Recipient(s)/Nominee(s)	Result	Ref(s)
Filmfare Awards South	26 June 2015	Best Music Director – Tamil	Anirudh Ravichander	Won	
Mirchi Music Awards South	14 September 2014	Album of the Year – Tamil	Velaiilla Pattadhari	Nominated	
Mirchi Music Awards South	14 September 2014	Song of the Year – Tamil	"Vela Illa Pattadhaari"	Nominated	
Mirchi Music Awards South	14 September 2014	Male Vocalist of the Year – Tamil	Anirudh Ravichander for "Vela Illa Pattadhaari"	Nominated	
Mirchi Music Awards South	14 September 2014	Female Vocalist of the Year – Tamil	S. Janaki for "Amma Amma"	Nominated	
Mirchi Music Awards South	14 September 2014	Lyricist of the Year – Tamil	Dhanush for "Amma Amma"	Nominated	
Mirchi Music Awards South	14 September 2014	Music Composer of the Year – Tamil	Anirudh Ravichander for "Amma Amma"	Won	
Mirchi Music Awards South	14 September 2014	Listeners' Choice Song of the Year – Tamil	"Vela Illa Pattadhaari"	Won (2nd place)	
Mirchi Music Awards South	14 September 2014	Listeners' Choice Album of the Year – Tamil	Velaiilla Pattadhari	Won (2nd place)	
South Indian International Movie Awards	6–7 August 2015	Best Lyricist – Tamil	Dhanush for "Amma Amma"	Won	
South Indian International Movie Awards	6–7 August 2015	Best Playback Singer (Male) – Tamil	Dhanush for "Amma Amma"	Nominated	
South Indian International Movie Awards	6–7 August 2015	Most Streamed Song – Tamil	"Vela Illa Pattadhaari"	Won	
Vijay Awards	25 April 2015	Best Music Director	Anirudh Ravichander	Won	
Vijay Awards	25 April 2015	Favourite Song	"Amma Amma"	Won	

== Album credits ==
Credits adapted from CD liner notes

=== Producer ===
Anirudh Ravichander

=== Songwriters ===
- Anirudh Ravichander (Composer, Arranger)
- Dhanush (Lyrics)

=== Performers ===
Anirudh Ravichander, Dhanush, S. Janaki

=== Musicians ===
- Guitars - Keba Jeremiah, Sajith Satya, R. Prasanna, Rex Vijayan, Godfray Immanuel
- Bass - Naveen
- Tavil - Sundhar
- Tabla - MT Aditya Srinivasan
- Ganjeera - S. Swaminathan
- Nadaswaram - D. Balasubramani
- Indian Rhythm & Percussions - Krishna Kishore
- Flute - Kareem Kamlakhar, Naveen Kumar
- Piano, Keyboards, Synth, Rhythm and Electronic Programming - Anirudh Ravichander
- Additional Rhythm Programming - Shashank Vijay

=== Additional Vocals ===
Veena Murali, Deepthi Suresh, Sowmya, Deepak Blue, Aravind Srinivas, Maalavika Sundar, Niranjana Ramanan, Narayanan, Keba Jeremiah, Lavita Lobo, Inno Genga, Sajith Satya, Vinay Sridhar, Nadisha Thomas, Kavitha Thomas, Sanjana Rajnarayan, Shenbagaraj

Beatbox - Hardee Bee

Orchestral Programming - Ishaan Chhabra

Vocal Arrangement - Arjun Chandy

=== Sound Engineers ===
- Albuquerque Records, Chennai - Srinivasan, Ananthakrrishnan, Pradeep Kannan, Manoj
- AM Studios, Chennai - S. Sivakumar, Hari Dafusia Pawan CH, Ishaan Chhabra, AH Kaashif

=== Production ===
- Music Advisor - Ananthakrrishnan
- Creative Consultant - Sajith Satya
- Music Supervisor - Harish Raam L. H.
- Mixed by - Vinay Sridhar
- Mastered by Shadab Rayeen at New Edge Studios, Mumbai
- MfiT - S. Sivakumar
- Music Coordinator - Samidurai, Velavan
