= Akanksha Sharma =

Indian actress and model (born 1999)

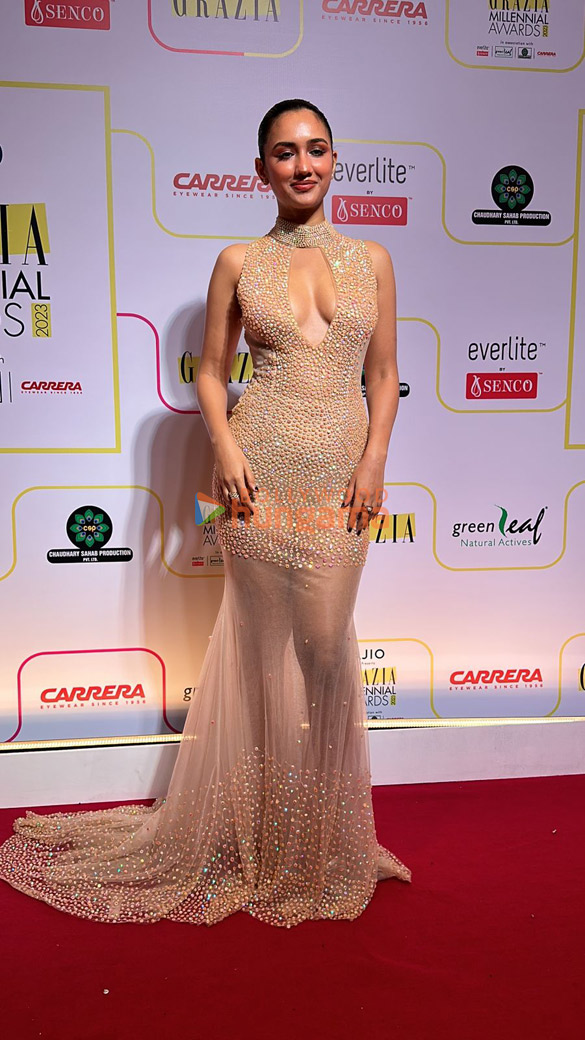
- Sharma at Grazia Millennial Awards 2023
- Born: April 14, 1996 (age 30)
- Occupations: Actress, model
- Years active: 2016-present

Akanksha Sharma (born 14 April 1996) is an Indian actress and model who has appeared in Hindi, Kannada and Telugu-language films, and music videos. She is primarily known for her roles in Keshari Veer, Laila and Trivikrama.

== Career ==
Sharma began working in the entertainment industry through modeling assignments. She participated in India's next top model Season 2 , which aired in 2016. In 2018, she appeared in the music video Do Din, performed by Darshan Raval. She was later featured in I Am Disco Dancer 2.0 (2020), a recreation of a 1980s Hindi film song, performed by Benny Dayal.

In 2021, she appeared in the music video Jugnu, performed by Badshah and Nikhita Gandhi. In the same year, she featured in the video Casanova, performed by Tiger Shroff. In 2023, she appeared in the Punjabi-language music video Psycho, performed by Harrdy Sandhu.

Sharma made her film debut in the Kannada-language feature Trivikrama in 2022, where she played the character of Trisha, an acting debut that the New Indian Express found "formulaic".

She appeared in two films in 2025: Laila (Telugu film), in the role of Jenny; a review in the Times of India noted: "Akanksha Sharma, as Jenny, is bold and glamorous, making a striking impression. While her role doesn't offer much beyond supporting Sonu's [the male lead] journey, her energy adds some spark to the film." A review in The Hindu noted that "the camera waste(d) no opportunity to objectify her."

The same year she played in Kesari Veer (a Hindi film), portraying the character of Rajal, and a review in The Hans said of her that she had "a luminous screen presence but [...] a long way to go."

== Filmography ==
=== Television ===
Year	Title	Role	Language
2016	India's Next Top Model	Herself (contestant)	Hindi

=== Films ===
Year	Title	Role	Language	Ref.
2022	Trivikrama	Trisha	Kannada	
2025	Laila	Jenny	Telugu	
2025	Kesari Veer	Rajal	Hindi	
2026	Tera Yaar Hoon Main	Anu	Hindi	

=== Music videos ===
Year	Title	Performer(s)
2018	Do Din	Darshan Raval
2020	I Am Disco Dancer 2.0	Benny Dayal
2021	Jugnu	Badshah, Nikhita Gandhi
2021	Casanova	Tiger Shroff
2023	Psycho	Harrdy Sandhu
