= Sooraj Pancholi =

Indian actor (born 1990)

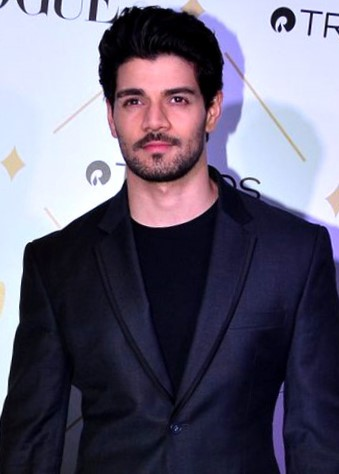
- Pancholi in 2017
- Born: Bombay, Maharashtra, India
- Occupation: Actor
- Years active: 2015–Present
- Partners: Jiah Khan (2012–13)
- Parent(s): Aditya Pancholi (father); Zarina Wahab (mother)

Sooraj Pancholi is an Indian actor who appears in Hindi-language films. The son of actors Aditya Pancholi and Zarina Wahab, he debuted with the 2015 romantic action film Hero, for which he won a Filmfare Award for Best Newcomer. He also starred in the 2019 action drama film Satellite Shankar opposite Megha Akash.

== Early life ==
Pancholi was born to Aditya Pancholi and Zarina Wahab in Mumbai. His parents are also Bollywood actors. He has a sister, Sana Pancholi, and his grandfather, Rajan Pancholi, was a filmmaker.

== Career ==
Sooraj was an assistant director on films such as Guzaarish and Ek Tha Tiger. In 2015, he made his acting debut in the romantic action film Hero, which earned him a Filmfare Award for Best Newcomer in 2016. He then acted in Satellite Shankar, which was released on 8 November 2019. He then starred in the dance film Time to Dance (2021). He has also appeared in the music videos GF BF (2016) and Dim Dim Lights (2019). He then starred in the period action film Kesari Veer, which received negative reviews from critics and became a box office bomb.

== Personal life ==
Pancholi dated actress Jiah Khan before her death in 2013. Tabloids in 2016 linked Pancholi with Pakistani actress Mawra Hocane, but he denied any relationship with her. From 2016 to 2019, he dated Brazilian model Larissa Bonesi, with whom he has worked in the music video "Dim Dim Light".

== Controversy ==
Pancholi was arrested after actress Jiah Khan, whom he was dating, died on 3 June 2013. He was taken into custody by the police during the investigation of her suicide on 10 June 2013 and was granted bail in July 2013. On 31 January 2018, Pancholi was formally charged with abetting the suicide; however, he denied involvement in the death, describing himself as a scapegoat for her decision to end her life.

In April 2023, a CBI Special Court acquitted Pancholi due to a lack of evidence after ten years of court battles. Sooraj wrote on Instagram, "The truth always wins," and added the hashtag "God is great." In response to the court's judgement, Khan's mother told the media that she would move to a high court.

== Filmography ==
=== Films ===
Key
†	Denotes films that have not yet been released

Year	Title	Role	Notes
2015	Hero	Suraj Kaushik	
2019	Satellite Shankar	Shankar	
2021	Time to Dance	Rishabh	
2025	Kesari Veer	Hamirji Gohil	

== Awards ==
Year	Award	Category	Work	Result
2015	Stardust Awards	Best Jodi (Pair) Of The Year (Shared with Athiya Shetty)	Hero	Won
2016	Filmfare Awards	Best Male Debut	Hero	Won
2016	Producers Guild Film Awards	Most Promising Debut Jodi (Shared with Athiya Shetty)	Hero	Won
2016	International Indian Film Academy Awards	Hottest Pair (shared with Athiya Shetty)	Hero	Won
2016	Screen Awards	Most Promising Newcomer – Male	Hero	Nominated

== See also ==
- List of Indian film actors
