= Chal Mohan Ranga =

2018 film directed by Krishna Chaitanya

- Directed by: Krishna Chaitanya
- Screenplay by: Krishna Chaitanya
- Story by: Trivikram Srinivas
- Produced by: N. Sudhakar Reddy; Pawan Kalyan; Trivikram Srinivas
- Starring: Nithiin; Megha Akash
- Cinematography: Natty Subramaniam
- Edited by: M. S. Rajashekhar Reddy (S. R. Shekhar)
- Music by: S. S. Thaman
- Production companies: Shresht Movies; Pawan Kalyan Creative Works
- Release date: 5 April 2018
- Country: India
- Language: Telugu
- Box office: est. ₹17.6 crore

Chal Mohan Ranga (transl. Go ahead, Mohan Ranga (Note: While the phrase is generally used while prodding someone encouragingly to move ahead, in this case, it may also mean to encourage the protagonist Mogan Ranga to go ahead.)) is a 2018 Indian Telugu-language romantic comedy film directed by Krishna Chaitanya and produced by Sudhakar Reddy along with Pawan Kalyan and Trivikram Srinivas. The film stars Nithiin and Megha Akash, while Madhunandan, Rao Ramesh, Naresh and Lissy play supporting roles. The film has story by Trivikram Srinivas and the cinematography is by Natty Subramaniam.

The film's score and soundtrack are scored by S. S. Thaman. The theatrical trailer was released on 13 March 2018. The film was released on 5 April 2018 to mixed reviews praising the performances, music, and comedy but criticizing the story-less and flat narration. The film commercially failed at the box office. Lissy made her comeback with this film in a supporting role, after a 27-year hiatus.

== Plot ==
The film opens with the arrival of an ambulance to a respective hospital. As the ambulance door opens and takes the victims of an accident to the ICU for treatment, Mohan Ranga (Nithiin) narrates his story. Mohan is an independent teenager in Hyderabad who is interested in going to the USA, but couldn't go. At last, he goes to the USA by taking a dead body, through which he got a visa. There, he meets Megha Lokesh in a car as he was going for a sponsorship interview. They fall in love and the story revolves. At last, they came to know they are friends before. The film concludes with the characters confessing to each other.

== Cast ==
- Nithiin as Mohan Ranga
- Megha Akash as Megha Subramanyam
- Madhunandan as Vilas
- Rao Ramesh as Ramesh
- Naresh as Mohan's father
- Pragathi as Mohan's mother
- Lissy as Megha's mother
- Sanjay Swaroop as Megha's father
- Baby Hasini as Megha's sister
- Neeraja Kona as Miami
- Kireeti Damaraju as Ramesh's son
- Ashu Reddy as Ashu
- Rohini Hattangadi as Saroja
- Satya as Mohan's friend
- Pammi Sai as Mohan's friend

== Soundtrack ==
Chal Mohan Ranga

Soundtrack album by S. S. Thaman
- Released: 18 March 2018
- Recorded: 2018
- Genre: Soundtrack
- Length: 24:25
- Label: Mango Music
- Producer: S. S. Thaman

S. S. Thaman chronology
Inttelligent (2018)	Chal Mohan Ranga (2018)	Aravinda Sametha Veera Raghava (2018)

The film's soundtrack consists of six songs composed by S. S. Thaman.

Original Tracklist (Telugu)
No.	Title	Lyrics	Singer(s)	Length
1.	"Pedda Puli"	Sahithi	Rahul Sipligunj	03:50
2.	"Very Very Sad"	Balaji	Yazin Nizar, Sanjana Divaker Kalmanje	03:53
3.	"Miami"	Neeraja Kona	Aditi Singh Sharma, Manisha Eerabathini	03:42
4.	"Vaaram"	Kedarnath	Nakash Aziz	03:58
5.	"Gha Gha Megha"	Krishna Kanth	Rahul Nambiar	04:03
6.	"Ardham Leni Navvu"	Raghuram	T. Sreenidhi	04:07

Tracklist (Hindi Dubbed)
No.	Title	Singer(s)	Length
1.	"Jab Bhi Bolu - Pedda Puli"	S. S. Thaman, Dubbing Artists, Rahul Sipligunj	03:54

== Critical reception ==
Neeshita Nyayapati of The Times of India gave the film a rating of 2.5 out of 5 saying that, "‘Chal Mohan Ranga’ is an aimless and time-pass ride, which starts out with promise and has a few highs – if only it had a better story and character development." Priyanka Sundar of Hindustan Times gave the film a rating of 2 out of 5 saying that the film "suffers throughout because of cliches and would have been unbearable if not for the comedy woven throughout." Hemanth Kumar of Firstpost gave the film a rating of 2 out of 5 saying that, "This was a soul-sucking experience and it's hard to recall any other ‘romantic drama’ in recent times which crushed the whole point of what makes a romantic film ‘romantic’ to pulp and that too in such a glorious manner." Suresh Kavirayani of Deccan Chronicle gave the film a rating of 2.5 out of 5 saying that, "First half is narrated in an entertaining way and the second half is saved by the climax. It's just a time pass film."
