= Raja Raja Chora =

2021 film by Hasith Goli

- Theatrical release poster
- Directed by: Hasith Goli
- Written by: Hasith Goli
- Produced by: Abhishek Agarwal; T. G. Vishwa Prasad
- Starring: Sree Vishnu; Megha Akash; Sunaina; Ravi Babu
- Cinematography: Vedaraman Sankaran
- Edited by: Viplav Nyshadam
- Music by: Vivek Sagar
- Production companies: Abhishek Agarwal Arts; People Media Factory
- Release date: 19 August 2021
- Country: India
- Language: Telugu
- Budget: 7cr
- Box office: est. ₹21.15 crore

Raja Raja Chora is a 2021 Indian Telugu-language crime comedy film written and directed by debutant Hasith Goli. Produced by Abhishek Agarwal Arts and People Media Factory, the film stars Sree Vishnu, Megha Akash, Sunaina and Ravi Babu. The film was released on 19 August 2021.

The plot follows the protagonist, his family and others who cross his path, exploring aspects of survival in the city, crime, punishment and redemption. Raja Raja Chora received positive reviews from the critics, who were particularly appreciative of film's screenplay, background score and performances of lead actors.

== Plot ==
One night, Bhaskar breaks into a house and steals valuables. It is later revealed that he works at a stationery store, where he manipulates customers and makes money, despite the owner being unaware of his actions. He lies to his girlfriend, Sanjana, that he works as a software engineer. Whenever Bhaskar meets Sanjana, he dresses as a software employee. The couple plans to move to Bangalore and dream of buying their own house.

Meanwhile, Sub Inspector William Reddy, who is the maternal uncle of Sanjana, is under pressure to curb crime in his jurisdiction and stop under-reporting cases to get promoted. He has an affair with Buela, the wife of his close friend, Madhav, and often visits Madhav's house when the latter is out of town for work. Bhaskar, meanwhile, is revealed to be married to Vidya, who is studying at a law school, and the couple has a son. Bhaskar and Vidya are estranged, and Bhaskar is still with her due to her blackmail about filing a cheating case. Vidya frequently demands that Bhaskar pay for her education. Eventually, Sanjana discovers that Bhaskar has a child, and Bhaskar learns that Sanjana is not a software employee, but is a salesgirl. Bhaskar lies to her that he is a widower. Fed up with living two lives, he wants to move to Bangalore with Sanjana. He plans one final heist that would settle him for life.

Bhaskar frequents Anjamma's workshop and stores his loot there. He puts on the theatrical costume of a king upon insistence from Anjamma, who believes the costume brings immense wealth. He sets out for his final heist that night and burgles the house of Madhav's neighbour. At the same time, Madhav returns home early from a camp. William, at Madhav's house, tries to escape when he learns of Madhav's arrival. As Madhav catches William half-naked with Buela, Bhaskar, who is leaving from his robbery scene, climbs over the wall into Madhav's house, and the trio find one another at the same time.

Bhaskar is now apprehended by William after being caught in the act. Vidya, who is being questioned, learns about William's affair with Madhav's wife and threatens William with legal assistance in pressing adultery and harassment charges if Bhaskar isn't set free. William reluctantly agrees to release Bhaskar, warning him to stop his theft. Vidya is disgusted by Bhaskar's act of stealing. When she believes that he became a thief for his wife and child, she grows affectionate and asks Bhaskar to leave the thieving life; Bhaskar grows fond of Vidya and ignores Sanjana. William has a new plan for Bhaskar: he forces Bhaskar to commit more robberies using the king's costume and gives him a cut in exchange for the non-involvement of the police. Bhaskar complies so that he can buy a small house and move in with his wife and child. Things take a turn when Bhaskar realises that William is planning to sensationally catch Bhaskar as the thief in a costume of a Raja (transl. King), thereby getting promoted at work. Bhaskar tells William that he wears the Raja costume for each heist because it gives him immense confidence, and advises him to use it when he requires a confidence boost for anything. William later learns about Bhaskar's affair with Sanjana and tries to reveal to Sanjana Bhaskar's crimes and his marriage, but Sanjana is undeterred, believing William is lying to get her to marry him. Angered, approaches Vidya claiming that Bhaskar has continued his robberies despite her earlier insistence and is planning to run away with Sanjana. Later, William informs Sanjana's mother about her salesgirl job, as she believed her daughter worked in a corporate job. Bhaskar is conned as he loses the entire family savings, which he kept for buying a new house as a surprise for Vidya. Believing that Bhaskar is staging it, Vidya leaves him along with their child. Sanjana also learns that Bhaskar's wife is alive, much to her shock, and ends their relationship. Later, Sanjana's mother questions her actions and takes her to their hometown. Meanwhile, Bhaskar approaches Madhav in a desperate attempt to save himself from William. Madhav and the police catch William, dressed in the King's costume, red-handed with Beula. The police and media are convinced that William is the sought-after thief in the city.

Finally, a famous preacher, Ganapathi, explains about the cheating nature of people and how they were punished by God: Bhaskar, who cheated and stole valuables for his selfish motives, is imprisoned. Sanjana, good at micro art but lured by a corporate job and city lifestyle, for which she started lying, was punished after revealing the truth of Bhaskar and her dreams which were shattered, William being a cop, misused his power and cheated his best friend, who was punished for his adultery, and he framed himself in the Raja costume as a thief.

Bhaskar, regretting his past crimes and cheating, decides to turn himself in to atone for his mistakes. He has served his prison sentence, while Vidya is a successful lawyer and now owns a house. In the end, a reformed Bhaskar is seen going to Vidya, in the hope that she will accept him.

== Cast ==
- Sree Vishnu as Bhaskar
- Sunaina as Vidya, Bhaskar's wife
- Megha Akash as Sanjana
- Ravi Babu as SI William Reddy, Sanjana's uncle
- Tanikella Bharani as Ghanapati
- Srikanth Iyengar as Dr. Tirumala Rao
- Ajay Ghosh as Xerox shop Owner Subrahmanyam
- Gangavva as Anjamma
- Vasu Inturi as Madhav, William's friend
- Kadambari Kiran as Narayana, William's assistant
- Karthikeya Krishna as Lingaraju, Bhaskar's son
- Shruti Singampalli as DSP Kanakam
- Rocket Raghava as Bhaskar's brother-in-law
- Indu as Buela, Madhav's wife
- Aruna Bikshu as William's mother

== Production ==
Although it was officially announced in February 2020, principal photography of the film began much earlier in 2020. The script was completed in three months. In March 2020, T.G. Vishwaprasad told Deccan Chronicle that the first schedule of the film has been finished. Filming was then paused due to COVID-19 pandemic in India. It was later resumed in October 2020. The film's name is a pun on the name of the Chola emperor Raja Raja Chola.

== Music ==
Raja Raja Chora

Soundtrack album by Vivek Sagar
- Recorded: 2020–2021
- Genres: Feature film soundtrack, Romance
- Language: Telugu
- Label: Zee Music Company
- Producer: Vivek Sagar

Vivek Sagar chronology
| HIT: The First Case (2020) | Raja Raja Chora (2020) | Ante Sundaraniki (2022) |
External audio
- Audio Jukebox on YouTube

Singles from Raja Raja Chora
- 1. "Raja Raju Vacche" Released: 28 July 2021; 2. "Maaya Maaya" Released: 12 August 2021

Soundtrack and score of the film is composed by Vivek Sagar, marking his second collaboration with Sree Vishnu after Brochevarevarura (2019). First single from the soundtrack – "Raja Raju Vacche" was released on 28 March 2021. The track is written by Hasith Goli and features primary vocals of Mohana Bhogaraju. Second single "Maaya Maaya" was released on 12 August 2021, sung by Anurag Kulkarni and written by Sanapati Bharadwaj Patrudu. The song has features additional (primarily backing) vocals of Yashwanth Nag, Anup Kumar Deshpande, Lakshmi Meghana, Sai Madhav, Ritesh Rao, Junaid Kumar and Shahbaaz Khan.

All music is composed by Vivek Sagar.

Original Soundtrack
| No. | Title | Lyrics | Singer(s) | Length |
|---|---|---|---|---|
| 1. | "Raja Raju Vacche" | Hasith Goli | Mohana Bhogaraju | 4:52 |
| 2. | "Maaya Maaya" | Sanapati Bharadwaj Patrudu | Anurag Kulkarni | 5:00 |
| 3. | "Bandeena Bandeena" | Sanapati Bharadwaj Patrudu | Pradeep Kumar | 6:21 |
| 4. | "Prapancha Jishnu" | Jonnavittula Ramalingeswara Rao | Vaikom Vijayalakshmi | 4:23 |
| 5. | "Nijam Ide Kada" | Krishna Kanth | Sid Sriram | 4:42 |

== Release and marketing ==
In early-August 2021, the film's released was announced as on 19 August 2021. The film's digital rights were sold to ZEE5 and the satellite rights were sold to Zee Telugu respectively. On 11 June 2021, a cartoon video was released, with the voice-over of Gangavva. In the video, she narrates the funny tale behind the Raja Raja Chora and how the lead character escaped from the kingdom after stealing the King's crown.

== Reception ==
=== Critical reception ===
The Hindu critic Sangeetha Devi Dundoo stated that: "[Raja Raja Chora] is a quirky comedy with laugh aloud segments and an emotional tale of punishment and redemption." She appreciated the performances of the cast, music, cinematography and editing, adding, "Hasith Goli joins the list of directors to watch out for in Telugu cinema." Neeshitha Nyayapati of The Times of India rated the film 3/5 and gave a more mixed review. While Nyayapati appreciated the screenplay and the narrative style, she felt that the run time was not justified.

Anji Shetty in his review for Sakshi, rated 2.75/5 and appreciated the storyline and opined that the direction could have been better. Shetty felt that Sagar's soundtrack was passable but he appreciated the background score and cinematography. A reviewer from Eenadu praised the screenplay and Vishnu's performance while adding that narrative was slow in the second half. Prakash Pecheti of Telangana Today cited that "Raja Raja Chora’ steals the show" adding that the director Hasith Goli imagined the story from a third man's perspective. And the mythological tone sets the ball rolling from the word go.

=== Box office ===
Sakshi Post reported that the film collected a gross of ₹15 million at the box office, in its opening day. In the first week, the film has grossed ₹70 million at the box office. At the US box office, the film grossed $140,000 the first week of its release.
