= Darling 2 =

2016 Indian film by Sathish Chandrasekaran

- Directed by: Sathish Chandrasekaran
- Written by: Sathish Chandrasekaran (Dialogues by G.Radhakrishnan)
- Produced by: K. E. Gnanavel Raja; G.Radhakrishnan; Rameez Raja
- Starring: Kalaiyarasan; Rameez Raja; Maya; Kaali Venkat; Arjunan; Ramdoss
- Cinematography: Vijay Kartik Kannan
- Edited by: Madan
- Music by: Radhan
- Production company: Rite Media Works
- Distributed by: Studio Green
- Release date: 1 April 2016
- Running time: 117 minutes
- Country: India
- Language: Tamil

Darling 2 is a 2016 Tamil language comedy horror film directed by debutant Sathish Chandrasekaran and produced by Rite Media Works. The film stars Kalaiyarasan along with debutant Rameez Raja.

The film was earlier titled Jinn. K. E. Gnanavel Raja, impressed with the film, acquired the rights for the film and renamed it to Darling 2, making it a sequel to Darling (2015). The film released on 1 April 2016 to negative reviews from critics and became flop at Box office.

== Plot ==
The film opens with a girl coming to see her parents getting possessed by a ghost.

The scene shifts to five friends who plan for a trip to Valparai. Aravind, initially reluctant to go, later accepts to have fun with his friends. They travel together when one of his friends, while clearing up his room, visualizes eerie things but refuses to tell his friends as he would be teased. They all reach Valparai and meet Valparai Varadhan, who gets things done for them.

Ayesha, the lover of their friend Ram, brings them dinner. Mysterious things occur, and the friends think that Krishna, Ram's brother, is possessed. Later, when they check the photo taken, they see Ram with them and understand that Ram is responsible for all the eerie things. When they go to Aravind to tell him about Krishna, they come to know that Aravind is possessed by Ram and not Krishna. Ram narrates the story, telling that Aravind promised him to get permission for Ram from his parents to marry his girlfriend Ayesha. His parents did not accept her as she is a Muslim. Aravind tells Ram and Ayesha to stay at Valparai for few days, and by then his parents would accept. One day, Ram's parents make another arrangement for his wedding, but Aravind calls and tells Ram that convincing his parents can never happen as they dislike Ayesha. Then later, Aravind receives a call from Rafiq that Ram has slit his hands and committed suicide. In order to avoid Ayesha getting hurt, Aravind hides it from her and goes to Ram's house.

The scene shifts to Aravind possessed by Ram, who tells that he needs only Aravind to be killed and will never do anything to his Krishna or the other three of them. The friends seek help from Varadhan and try to tie a holy string. After several attempts, they do it and bring Aravind back. They go to the place where Ayesha lived and are shocked to see that she has already committed suicide on knowing about Ram's death. It was her spirit who brought dinner for them.

On that day when they are about leave Valparai, they are confronted by Ram and Ayesha, Aravind says that he is ready to die for this friend and says the story. It was Ram's birthday, so to surprise him, Aravind had told him to come to a place. The place is then revealed to be the register's office to get Ram and Ayesha married. Aravind wanted to surprise Ram by giving him a birthday gift, who is going to be Ayesha. So he mischievously lies, telling him that his parents will not accept Ayesha and tells him to stop spoiling Ayesha's life. Taking this seriously, Ram commits suicide. Aravind feels sorry for him and asks to take his life but after forgiving him. Ram says he either has to kill Aravind or needs to live a life through Aravind. The screen goes blank, and after few weeks, Aravind is engaged to the same girl who was possessed in the beginning, which implies that Ram and Ayesha will live together with the help of Aravind and his wife.

== Cast ==
- Kalaiyarasan as Aravind
- Rameez Raja as Krishna and Ram
- Kaali Venkat as Rafi
- Arjunan as Shankar
- Hari Krishnan as Balaji
- Ramdoss as Valparai Varadhan
- Maya as Ayesha
- Swetha Gupta

== Production ==
The film was earlier titled JINN, but producer K. E. Gnanavel Raja of Studio Green made this as second part of his previous film Darling, which was also about a group of youngsters in a bungalow being terrorized by a ghost; he decided this could be part of the franchise.

The film is set in Valparai . The official trailer of the film was released on 21 October 2015.

== Release ==
The satellite rights of the film were sold to Jaya TV.

== Soundtrack ==
The soundtrack was composed by Radhan of Andala Rakshasi and Yevade Subramanyam fame. Think Music have acquired the audio rights.

Darling 2

Soundtrack album by Radhan
- Released: 2016
- Recorded: 2016
- Genre: Feature film soundtrack
- Length: 21:36
- Language: Tamil
- Producer: Radhan

Radhan chronology
Yevade Subramanyam (2015)	Darling 2 (2016)	Radha (2017)

Track list
No.	Title	Artist(s)	Length
1.	"Machi Vaada Ne Dhan Friendu"	Ramee	03:10
2.	"Olarava Olarava"	Varun Parandhaman, Muthamizh, Ramee	03:59
3.	"Ni Sa Gari Sa"	Naresh Iyer, Anweshaa	04:30
4.	"Kaatril"	Nikhita Gandhi	03:40
5.	"Darling 2 (Theme Song)"	Radhan	01:34
6.	"Ni Sa Gari Sa Karaoke"	Ramee	04:43
Total length:			21:36

== See also ==
- Darling (2015)
