= Premadesam =

2023 Indian romantic thriller film

- Poster
- Directed by: Srikanth Siddham
- Written by: Srikanth Siddham
- Screenplay by: Srikanth Siddham
- Produced by: Shireesha Siddham
- Starring: Thrigun; Megha Akash; Ajay Kathurvar; Maya; Madhubala; Shiva Ramachandra
- Cinematography: Sajad Kaakku
- Edited by: Kiran Thumpera
- Music by: Mani Sharma
- Production company: Siri Creative Works
- Release date: 3 February 2023
- Running time: 139 minutes
- Country: India
- Language: Telugu

Premadesam (transl. Country of love) is a 2023 Indian Telugu-language romantic drama film directed and produced by Srikanth Siddham. The film stars Thrigun, and Megha Akash, in lead roles while Ajay Kathurvar, Maya, Madhubala and Shiva Ramachandra plays important supporting roles. The film's music was composed by Mani Sharma.

== Cast ==
- Thrigun as Arjun
- Megha Akash as Aadya
- Ajay Kathurvar as Rishi
- Maya as Maya
- Madhubala as Arjun's mother
- Shiva Ramachandra as Shiva
- Vaishnavi Chaitanya as Maya's sister
- Tanikella Bharani as Maya's father
- Viva Harsha as Arjun's friend

== Soundtrack ==
The music for the film was composed by Mani Sharma.

Track listing
No.	Title	Lyrics	Singer(s)	Length
1.	"Padamule Levu Pilla"	Karunakar Adigarla	Armaan Malik, Harika Narayan	4:14
2.	"Thelavarene Swamy"	Ala Raju	Anjana Sowmya, Anurag Kulkarni	3:52
3.	"Azadi Azadi"	Rehman	Sreerama Chandra	3:53
4.	"Kallu Kallu Kalisayi"	Purnachary	Anurag Kulkarni	3:39
Total length:				15:38

== Release ==
The film was originally scheduled to release on 2 December 2022 before the release was postponed to 3 February 2023.

== Reception ==
A critic from The Times of India wrote that "Premadesam is not anything like Prema Desam of 1996; instead, it’s a romantic drama with a peppy first and mellow second half". A critic from OTTplay wrote that "On the whole, Prema Desam has a good plot. The romance and performances are good ". A critic from Sakshi Post wrote that "While some situations do give a feeling that we have seen them in past, the treatment and characterizations makes it a good watch. The family emotions and the romantic tracks are well-executed".
