= 6th Screen Awards =

Awards for Hindi-language films of 1999

- Date: 23 January 2000
- Site: Andheri Sports Complex, Mumbai
- Hosted by: Lisa Ray; Cyrus Broacha

Highlights
- Best Picture: Hum Dil De Chuke Sanam
- Best Direction: Sanjay Leela Bhansali (Hum Dil De Chuke Sanam)
- Best Actor: Sanjay Dutt (Vaastav: The Reality)
- Best Actress: Aishwarya Rai Bachchan (Hum Dil De Chuke Sanam)
- Most awards: Hum Dil De Chuke Sanam (10)
- Most nominations: Hum Dil De Chuke Sanam (18)

Television coverage
- Channel: DD National; StarPlus
- Network: Doordarshan; Disney Star

The 6th Screen Awards also The Sixth Annual Screen–Videocon Awards ceremony, presented by Indian Express Group, honored the best Indian Hindi-language films of 1999. The ceremony was held on 23 January 2000 at Andheri Sports Complex, Mumbai, and hosted by Lisa Ray and Cyrus Broacha. The event was telecasted same day on DD National.

Hum Dil De Chuke Sanam led the ceremony with 18 nominations, followed by Taal with 11 nominations and Sarfarosh with 10 nominations.

Hum Dil De Chuke Sanam won 10 awards, including Best Film, Best Director (for Sanjay Leela Bhansali) and Best Actress (for Aishwarya Rai), thus becoming the most-awarded film at the ceremony.

== Awards ==
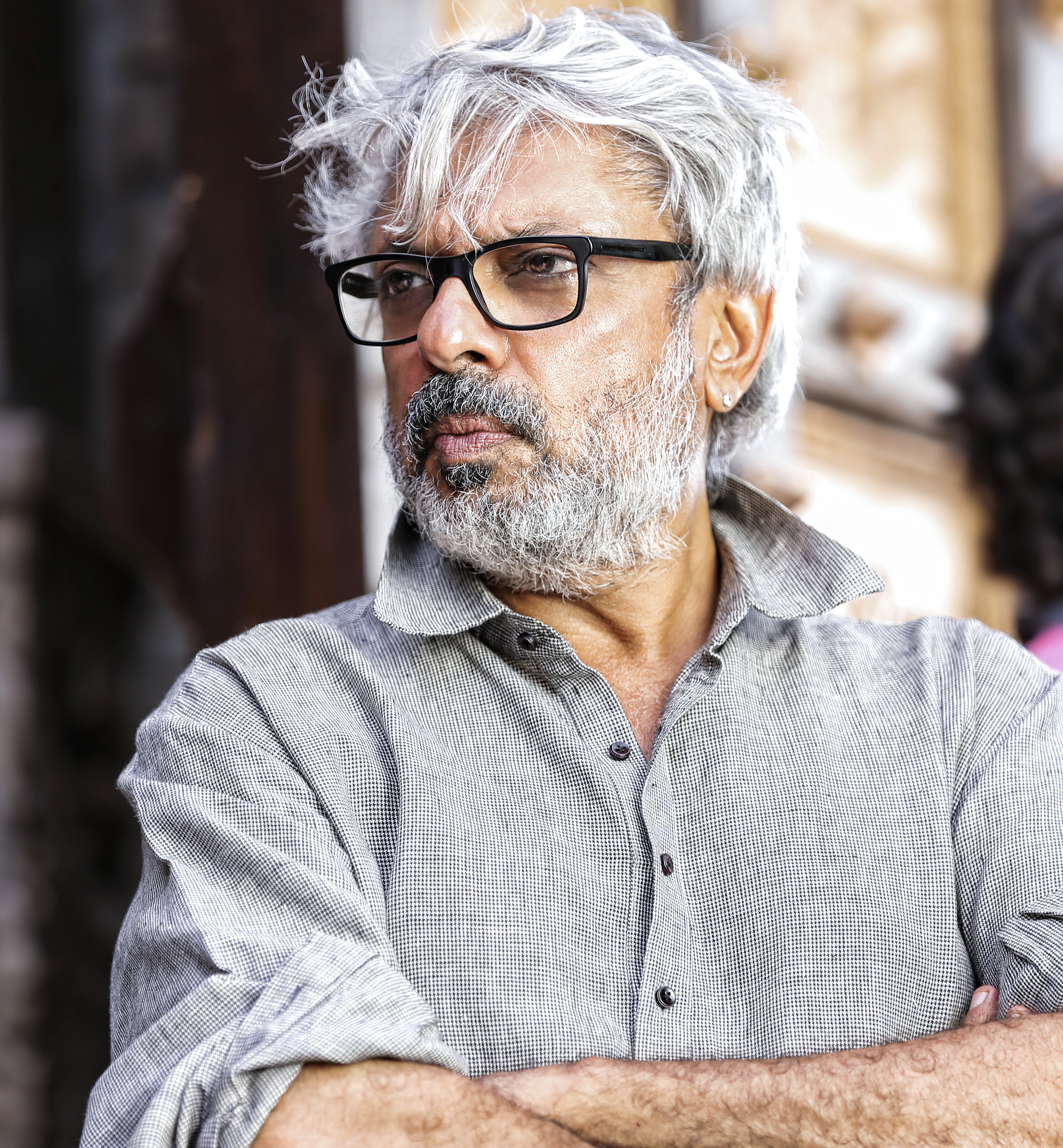
Sanjay Leela Bhansali — Best Director winner for Hum Dil De Chuke Sanam

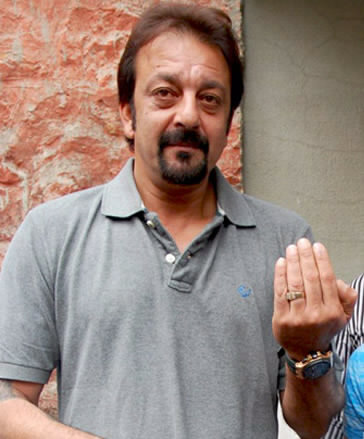
Sanjay Dutt — Best Actor winner for Vaastav: The Reality

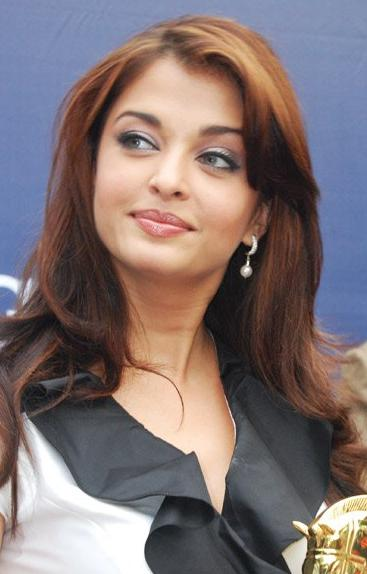
Aishwarya Rai Bachchan — Best Actress winner for Hum Dil De Chuke Sanam

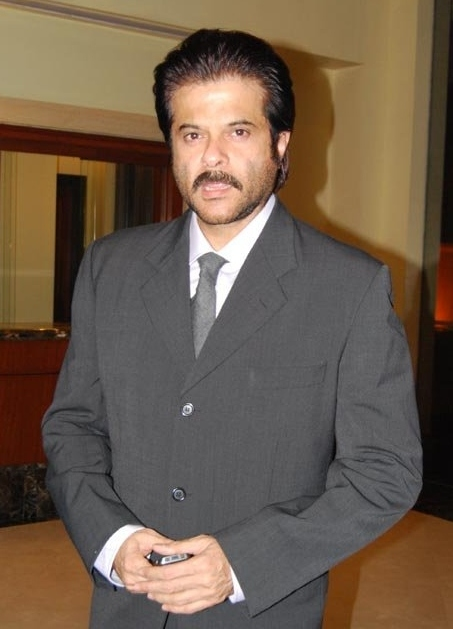
Anil Kapoor — Best Supporting Actor winner for Taal

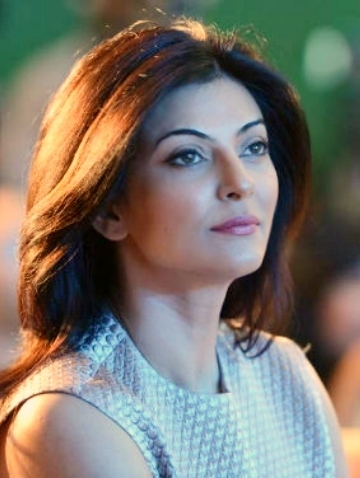
Sushmita Sen — Best Supporting Actress winner for Biwi No.1

The winners and nominees have been listed below. Winners are listed first, highlighted in boldface, and indicated with a double dagger (‡).

=== Jury awards ===
| Best Film | Best Director |
|---|---|
| **Hum Dil De Chuke Sanam**‡; Biwi No.1; Hum Aapke Dil Mein Rehte Hain; Sarfarosh; Taal | **Sanjay Leela Bhansali – Hum Dil De Chuke Sanam**‡; David Dhawan – Biwi No.1; John Matthew Matthan – Sarfarosh; Satish Kaushik – Hum Aapke Dil Mein Rehte Hain; Subhash Ghai – Taal |
| Best Actor | Best Actress |
| **Sanjay Dutt – Vaastav: The Reality**‡; Aamir Khan – Sarfarosh; Ajay Devgn – Hum Dil De Chuke Sanam; Govinda – Haseena Maan Jaayegi; Manoj Bajpayee – Shool | **Aishwarya Rai Bachchan – Hum Dil De Chuke Sanam**‡; Aishwarya Rai Bachchan – Taal; Kajol – Hum Aapke Dil Mein Rehte Hain; Karisma Kapoor – Biwi No.1; Shabana Azmi – Godmother; Tabu – Hu Tu Tu |
| Best Supporting Actor | Best Supporting Actress |
| **Anil Kapoor – Taal**‡; Anupam Kher – Hum Aapke Dil Mein Rehte Hain; Mukesh Rishi – Sarfarosh; Naseeruddin Shah – Bhopal Express; Sanjay Narvekar – Vaastav: The Reality | **Sushmita Sen – Biwi No.1**‡; Antara Mali – Mast; Kajol – Dil Kya Kare; Smita Jaykar – Hum Dil De Chuke Sanam; Suhasini Mulay – Hu Tu Tu |
| Best Actor in a Negative Role – Male / Female | Best Actor in a Comic Role – Male / Female |
| **Sayaji Shinde** – **Shool**‡; Ashutosh Rana – Sangharsh; Govind Namdev – Godmother; Mohan Joshi – Vaastav: The Reality; Rahul Bose – Thakshak | **Anupam Kher** – **Haseena Maan Jaayegi**‡; Aruna Irani – Haseena Maan Jaayegi; Johnny Lever – Anari No.1; Satish Kaushik – Haseena Maan Jaayegi; Tabu – Biwi No.1 |
| Best Music Director | Best Lyricist |
| **A. R. Rahman – Taal**‡; Anu Malik – Biwi No.1; Anu Malik – Hum Aapke Dil Mein Rehte Hain; Ismail Darbar – Hum Dil De Chuke Sanam; Sanjeev–Darshan – Mann | **Anand Bakshi – "Taal Se Taal" – Taal**‡; Anand Bakshi – "Khali Dil Nahi" – Kachche Dhaage; Anand Bakshi – "Ramta Jogi" – Taal; Israr Ansari – "Zindagi Maut Na Ban Jaye" – Sarfarosh; Mehboob – "Aankhon Ki Gustakhiyan" – Hum Dil De Chuke Sanam |
| Best Male Playback Singer | Best Female Playback Singer |
| **Sukhwinder Singh – "Ramta Jogi" – Taal**‡; KK – "Tadap Tadap" – Hum Dil De Chuke Sanam; Sonu Nigam, A. R. Rahman – "Ishq Bina" – Taal; Sukhwinder Singh – "Menu Lagan Lagi" – Dil Kya Kare; Udit Narayan – "Chand Chupa Badal Mein" – Hum Dil De Chuke Sanam | **Kavita Krishnamurti – "Hum Dil De Chuke Sanam" – Hum Dil De Chuke Sanam**‡; Alka Yagnik – "Taal Se Taal" – Taal; Asha Bhosle – "Kahin Aag Lage" – Taal; Asha Bhosle – "Mujhe Rang De" – Thakshak; Sunidhi Chauhan – "Ruki Ruki" – Mast |
| Most Promising Newcomer – Male | Most Promising Newcomer – Female |
| **Aftab Shivdasani – Mast**‡ | **Nethra Raghuraman – Bhopal Express**‡; Anoushka – Sar Ankhon Par; Nethra Raghuraman – Thakshak; Raima Sen – Godmother; Rinke Khanna – Pyaar Mein Kabhi Kabhi |
Most Promising Debut Director
**John Matthew Matthan – Sarfarosh**‡; Eeshwar Nivas – Shool; Mahesh Mathai – Bhopal Express; Milan Luthria – Kachche Dhaage; Sunny Deol – Dillagi

=== Technical awards ===
| Best Story | Best Screenplay |
|---|---|
| **John Matthew Matthan** – **Sarfarosh**‡; Pratap Karvat, Sanjay Leela Bhansali – Hum Dil De Chuke Sanam; Mahesh Manjrekar – Vaastav: The Reality; Eeshwar Nivas, Ram Gopal Varma – Shool; Vinay Shukla – Godmother | **Kenneth Phillipps, Sanjay Leela Bhansali – Hum Dil De Chuke Sanam**‡; Imtiaz Patel, Yunus Sajawal – Haseena Maan Jaayegi; John Matthew Matthan – Sarfarosh; Mahesh Manjrekar – Vaastav: The Reality; Rumi Jaffery – Biwi No.1 |
| Best Dialogue | Best Cinematography |
| **Amrik Gill** – **Hum Dil De Chuke Sanam**‡; Hriday Lani, Pathik Vats – Sarfarosh; Jainendra Jain – Hum Aapke Dil Mein Rehte Hain; Javed Siddiqui – Dil Kya Kare; Rumi Jaffery – Biwi No.1 | **Anil Mehta** – **Hum Dil De Chuke Sanam**‡ |
| Best Costumes | Best Special Effects |
| **Neeta Lulla** – **Taal**‡; Dolly Ahluwalia – 1947: Earth; Shabina Khan – Hum Dil De Chuke Sanam; Shabina Khan – Hum Saath-Saath Hain; Vikram Phadnis – Biwi No.1 | **Ramesh Meer – Hum Dil De Chuke Sanam**‡; Agnelo D'Souza – Baadshah; Biju Dhanpalan – Hindustan Ki Kasam; Biju Dhanpalan – Kartoos |
| Best Editing | Best Choreography |
| **Jethu Mundul** – **Sarfarosh**‡ | **Saroj Khan – "Nimbooda" – Hum Dil De Chuke Sanam**‡ |
| Best Sound Recording | Best Art Direction |
| **Narender Singh** – **Hu Tu Tu**‡ | **Nitin Chandrakant Desai** – **Hum Dil De Chuke Sanam**‡ |
Best Action Director
**Tinu Verma** – **Arjun Pandit**‡

=== Special awards ===
Lifetime Achievement Award
- **Naushad**
Special Jury Award
- **Shaheed Udham Singh** – **Chitraarth**

== Superlatives ==
Multiple nominations
| Nominations | Film |
|---|---|
| 18 | Hum Dil De Chuke Sanam |
| 11 | Taal |
| 10 | Sarfarosh |
| 9 | Biwi No.1 |
| 6 | Hum Aapke Dil Mein Rehte Hain |
| 5 | Haseena Maan Jaayegi |
| 5 | Vaastav: The Reality |
| 4 | Godmother |
| 4 | Shool |
| 3 | Bhopal Express |
| 3 | Dil Kya Kare |
| 3 | Hu Tu Tu |
| 3 | Mast |
| 3 | Thakshak |
| 2 | Kachche Dhaage |

Multiple wins
| Awards | Film |
|---|---|
| 10 | Hum Dil De Chuke Sanam |
| 5 | Taal |
| 3 | Sarfarosh |
