= Deosharan Singh =

Indian independence activist, and politician

Chairman of the Bihar Legislative Council
- In office 30 August 1965 – 6 May 1968

Chairman of the Bihar State Planning and Development Board
- In office 1963–1965

Health Minister of Bihar
- In office 1952–1953

Deputy Speaker of the Bihar Legislative Assembly
- In office 24 April 1946 – 31 March 1952

Member of the Bihar Legislative Council
- In office 14 September 1953 – 1974

Chairman of the Patna District Congress Committee
- In office 1954–1957

Personal details
- Born: August 17, 1901 Simra Bilgawan, Shahabad district, Bengal Presidency, British India
- Died: July 9, 1975 (aged 73) Bihar, India
- Party: Indian National Congress
- Occupation: Politician, freedom fighter, lawyer

Deosharan Singh (Hindi pronunciation: [deːoːʃəɾəɳ sɪŋɡʱ]; 17 August 1901 – 9 July 1975) was an Indian independence activist and politician from Bihar. He served as Deputy Speaker of the Bihar Legislative Assembly from 1946 to 1952, Health Minister in the Government of Bihar, and Chairman of the Bihar Legislative Council from 1965 to 1968. He was associated with the Indian National Congress and with peasant and backward class movements in Bihar.

== Early life and education ==
He was born on 17 August 1901 in Simra Bilgawan village in present-day Bhojpur district of Bihar, then part of Shahabad district in British India. He received his schooling at Bihar National Collegiate School in Patna. He later graduated from Bihar National College and studied law at Patna Law College under Patna University.

During his student years, he participated in the Non-Cooperation Movement of 1920. In 1927, he began practising law at the Barh Civil Court in Patna district.

== Political career ==
Singh participated in the Civil Disobedience Movement and the Indian independence movement and was imprisoned on several occasions. He was associated with peasant movements in Bihar from the mid-1930s and became a member of the All India Congress Committee in 1937. He later served on the Executive Committee of the Bihar Pradesh Congress Committee and was Chairman of the Patna District Congress Committee from 1954 to 1957.

In 1946, Singh was elected to the Bihar Legislative Assembly and served as Deputy Speaker from 24 April 1946 to 31 March 1952. He was re-elected to the assembly in the 1951 Bihar Legislative Assembly election from the Fatuha Assembly constituency as an Indian National Congress candidate. He later served as Health Minister in the cabinet headed by Shri Krishna Sinha.

== Death ==
Deosharan Singh died on 9 July 1975 after a prolonged illness. The locality of Chhajju Bagh in Patna was later renamed Deosharan Nagar in his honour. Gurusahay Deosharan Memorial College in Harnaut, Nalanda district, is named after him.
