= Bhopal: A Prayer for Rain =

2014 Indian English-language historical drama film

- Theatrical release poster
- Directed by: Ravi Kumar
- Written by: Ravi Kumar; David Brooks
- Produced by: Ravi Walia; Sahara Movie Studios
- Starring: Martin Sheen; Mischa Barton; Kal Penn; Rajpal Yadav; Tannishtha Chatterjee; Fagun Thakrar; Martin Brambach; David Brooks; Satish Kaushik; Vineet Kumar; Joy Sengupta; Manoj Joshi
- Cinematography: Charlie Wuppermann; Jean Marc Selva; Anil Chandel
- Edited by: Chris Gill
- Music by: Benjamin Wallfisch
- Distributed by: Revolver Entertainment Sahara Movie Studios (India)
- Release dates: 7 November 2014 (US); 5 December 2014 (India)
- Running time: 96 minutes
- Countries: India; United Kingdom
- Languages: Hindi; English
- Box office: $12,628

Bhopal: A Prayer for Rain is a 2014 Indian English-language historical drama film directed by Ravi Kumar. Based on the Bhopal disaster that happened in India on 2–3 December 1984, the film stars Martin Sheen, Mischa Barton, Kal Penn, Rajpal Yadav, Tannishtha Chatterjee and Fagun Thakrar. Benjamin Wallfisch composed the film's music. Kumar's idea for making a film based on the Bhopal disaster came after he read Sanjoy Hazarika's book: "Bhopal: Lessons of a Gas Tragedy" about it. Shot over a period of 18 months, it was originally scheduled for a late 2010 release. However, the lack of responses from distributors kept delaying the release.

In April 2013, a new trailer was released and the film received a market screening at the 2013 Cannes Film Festival on 16 and 19 May. It was also screened at Pan Asia, Dingle and the Tokyo International film festivals. Bhopal: A Prayer for Rain was released in the United States on 7 November 2014 and in India on 5 December 2014. A private screening of the film was held at the youth assembly in the United Nations on 7 August 2014.

The film received mixed reviews from critics, who praised the actors' portrayal of their respective characters but found the film underwhelming. A few organisations fighting for the rights of the victims of the tragedy blamed the film for presenting the facts in a distorted manner. Kumar and Sheen denied these allegations. The Madhya Pradesh government exempted the film from paying tax.

== Plot ==
In 1984, a few months before the Bhopal disaster, Dilip, a rickshaw driver, loses his income when his rickshaw breaks down while transporting an employee to the Union Carbide pesticide plant in Bhopal. Dilip lives in the slums near the plant with his wife, a son and his sister. He obtains a job in the plant as a labourer, and is happy since his daily wage is restored.

The plant's revenues drop due to lower sales of pesticides, and in order to reduce costs the officials neglect safety and maintenance. Questioning the chemicals used in the plant, Motwani, a tabloid reporter, publishes reports on his printing press which are disregarded by most of the officials and workers. Roy, the plant safety officer, expresses his concerns. The officials however ignore his warnings, and a worker is killed when a drop of methyl isocyanate leaking from a pipe lands on his arm. The officials deem the worker's irresponsibility as the cause of the accident and the plant continues to function. Dilip is given a better-paying vacant job in the plant despite lacking the skill to operate the machinery. A gas leak is prevented by Roy when water is mixed with methyl isocyanate, and in an attempt to stop people from panicking, the official in the plant disables the warning siren.

Warren Anderson, the CEO of Union Carbide, visits the plant to inspect its functionality, where he is briefed about a plan to connect two additional tanks for storage of methyl isocyanate to increase the output of the plant, ignoring the deteriorated condition of the tanks. Motwani meanwhile meets Eva Caulfield, a reporter for Paris Match, and persuades her to interview Anderson. She falsely claims to be an Associated Press reporter, but her lie is exposed during the interview. Motwani convinces Dilip of the danger posed by the chemicals.

As the date of the disaster nears, Dilip arranges a loan for his sister's wedding. Roy later explains how the company is ignoring safety standards and that a future leak might become uncontrolled as the officials had turned off safety measures to reduce maintenance costs. Roy gives his resignation to the company and advises Dilip not to talk about the plant's safety if he wishes to retain his job. Dilip makes a phone call to Motwani describing what Roy just said, and expresses his fear about the plant's safety, saying he will return to the rickshaw-pulling business as soon as his sister is married.

To overcome the increasing revenue loss, the officials shut down the plant, firing most of the workers, including Dilip. The plant officials then order the use of the remaining methyl isocyanate as soon as possible. Meanwhile, Dilip is busy with his sister's wedding, and Roy has a final look of the control room. The safety measures fail and a runaway reaction follows. The faulty tanks cause the gas to start leaking, and an attempt to contain the leak fails. The gas escapes to the surroundings and is carried east by the wind. Motwani rushes to alert the people in the vicinity of the plant to vacate and head west, since the warning sirens were previously sabotaged. He meets Dilip, who ignores the warning and asks Motwani to leave the area without causing any hindrance to the wedding. Meanwhile, the guests experience irritation in the eyes and discomfort in breathing. Dilip senses the danger and visits the plant, realising that the plant had been compromised. He rushes back to his residence where he finds his family and relatives dying from acute exposure to the toxic gas. He carries away his son, paying farewell to his wife's corpse and flees the slum.

As the gas shows its effects, a nearby hospital is filled with hundreds of patients reporting cyanide poisoning, and the lack of antidote results in most of the patients' death. Dilip, on his deathbed, and using the last of his strength, rips off his Union Carbide identity badge and after flinging it away, rests his dead son on the ground. He eventually accepts his fate to die in the highly toxic gas cloud and succumbs to the toxic gas, dying by his son's side. The story jumps to the present day, where a blind boy is holding Dilip's identity badge, and the film ends with Motwani narrating the words, "Whatever may be the cause of the disaster, Carbide never left Bhopal." A photo montage depicts the aftermath of the disaster and pictures of the characters and their real-life counterparts.

== Cast ==
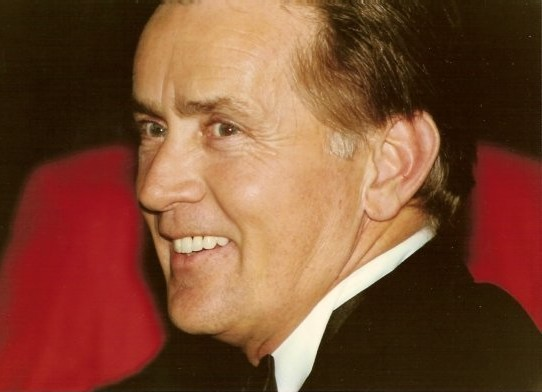
Martin Sheen played the role of Warren Anderson

- Martin Sheen as Warren Anderson, the chief executive of Union Carbide. Anderson was declared a fugitive by an Indian court.
- Mischa Barton as Eva Caulfield, a Paris Match reporter
- Kal Penn as Motwani, a local journalist. Penn said that the "larger-than-life, colourful role" of the reporter was what attracted him to the project. His role is inspired by the story of the Indian journalist Rajkumar Keswani.
- Rajpal Yadav as Dilip, a factory worker
- Tannishtha Chatterjee as Leela, Dilip's wife
- Manoj Joshi as Dr. Chandra
- Fagun Thakrar as Rekha
- Gopichand Lagadapati as Steward
- Akhil Mishra as Napoleon
- Joy Sengupta as Roy
- David Brooks as Shane
- Satish Kaushik as Labour Minister Lalit

== Production ==
In 2004, while reading Sanjoy Hazarika's book Bhopal: Lessons of a Tragedy, Ravi Kumar got the idea of making a film based on the Bhopal disaster, considered the world's deadliest industrial disaster. Seeing that very few people of the newer generation knew about the disaster, Kumar decided to make a film based on it. He chose several well known actors for the film because he felt that this provided more chances of showing the "story to the world." He wanted to cast Sheen for the role of Anderson, because of his political views and acting skills. Tannishtha Chatterjee and Rajpal Yadav were also cast for the film. Sienna Miller was previously attached to the project, but later dropped out and her role was given to Mischa Barton. In December 2008, it was confirmed that Barton, Sheen and Penn were filming in India for the project. A copy of the script was sent to Penn, who agreed to join the project. Penn played the role of an Indian journalist and learnt Hindi from an instructor. Shooting finished in January 2009. Initially, the film's story was written like a thriller and then dramatic elements were added. Kumar wanted to depict Anderson as a victim of organisational error of judgement but Sheen insisted that Anderson should be depicted as a guilty and so he rewrote some of the scenes. Made on a total budget of US$12 million, the film was shot in Hyderabad's Charminar area and Golconda Fort, Mumbai and the Union Carbide factory in Bhopal during a course of 18 months. A few scenes were also shot in Los Angeles. Hyderabad was chosen since it bore great resemblance to Bhopal in terms of its Mughal influence and architecture. Only a few important scenes were shot in Bhopal while the majority were shot on different factory locations and sets in order to create the setup for the period.

The script was jointly written by Kumar and David Brooks Miller. To present the correct technical and medical facts in the film, Kumar analysed documents of the court proceedings, forensic evidences and interviewed several survivors of the tragedy and also the staff members of the Union Carbide plant. Bhopal Group for Information and Action and many activists fighting for the rights of the victim of the disaster wanted to stop the film's screening, called it an insult to the victims, blamed the filmmakers of distorting the facts related to the disaster, diverting attention from Dow Chemical Company which acquired Union Carbide in 2001 and for portraying Anderson as a person who wanted to help the people but was unable to do so. Sheen denied these allegations and said that he did not sympathise for Anderson. Kumar also denied these allegations and said that the organisations had seen an older script. He added that making the film was a life-changing experience for him. A Prayer for Rain was added to the film's title because had it rained on the night of 2—3 December 1984, fewer people would have died.

On 7 January 2009, Barton was questioned by the Indian media on why she chose to sign on the project to which she responded "I'm interested in all kinds of things, I did this film for moral reasons. Also, I felt the story needed to be told, I feel that this is going to be an important film." Benjamin Wallfisch, an Emmy and Ivor Novello-nominated composer, composed music for Bhopal: A Prayer for Rain. The film was slated to release in 2010 but the lack of response from the distributors delayed the release. On the 30th anniversary of the Bhopal gas disaster, Shivraj Singh Chouhan, the chief minister of Madhya Pradesh attended the film's premiere in Bhopal and after watching the film he announced that the state government would not charge any tax on the film's earning. Chouhan called the film "very sensitive" and praised the "heart-rending" performance given by actors. To promote awareness about the tragedy a NGO The Bhopal Medical Appeal and the film's director collaborated with mobile commerce portal Paytm and the online shopping website Snapdeal. As part of the partnership Paytm and Snapdeal offered their customers a chance to donate money in form of online coupons to the disaster victims.

== Marketing and release ==
The first look of the film was unveiled on 18 September 2014 and the official trailer was released on the following day. Sheen felt that finding a theatrical release for the film would be difficult. He said that the film portrayed "America's cultural arrogance." Director Ravi Kumar opined that Anderson was guilty of the disaster. While promoting the film in New Delhi, he compared it to Titanic and said that the film "is realistic and poignant, but entertaining." Rajpal Yadav termed it the biggest project of his life and dedicated his role to the victims of the disaster.

The film was screened in Cannes, at the Pan Asia Film Festival in London, the Dingle Film Festival, and the Tokyo International Film Festival. The distributors advised director Kumar to remove a scene which they considered to be too dramatic for Western audiences. A private screening for a youth assembly was held at the United Nations. Revolver Entertainment acquired the distributor rights of the film for North American region in September 2014. The worldwide sales rights were acquired by GFM Films. The film's United States release was scheduled for 7 November 2014. A special screening of the film was held in New York on 18 September. Another special screening was conducted in Bhopal just prior to the release, attended by many well known actors of the Hindi film industry. The film opened in New York on 7 November, Los Angeles on 14 November and in India on 5 December 2014. Reportedly, Kumar had insured the film against libel for an undisclosed amount. Bhopal-based journalist Rajkumar Keswani wanted to sue the film producers for portraying him as a "salacious gossip columnist" before his lawyer advised him to watch the film first. He had seen the film's original script in which Penn's character was named Keswani. Inspired by the film, musician Sting collaborated with Anoushka Shankar to record a song. Kumar also confirmed their collaboration.

== Reception ==
Rotten Tomatoes, a review aggregator, rated the film 68% based on a total of 19 critic reviews, with an average rating of 6.40/10. Another review aggregator, Metacritic, gives the film a rating of 50% based on seven critic reviews, indicating "mixed or average reviews".

Meena Iyer of The Times of India praised the actors and noted that despite being based on true incidents the film "[managed] to connect emotionally". In her review for Hindustan Times, Sweta Kaushal wrote that director Ravi Kumar "should be congratulated for picking a rather grave subject" and praised the actors for doing justice to their respective characters. However, she felt that in portraying Dilip, Kumar took away the "severity of the issue" and that he did not put "the blame on anyone". Further, she opined that the film had depicted Anderson "as a rather humanist [person]". She concluded that better research should have been done and that the film "could have been a more involving story". While Kaushal felt that Barton's role was unnecessary, Anuj Kumar of The Hindu suggested that this role was planted in the story to provide Warren Anderson a chance to express his views. Kumar praised Yadav's acting by calling him the "face of the tragedy." He also praised Sheen but felt that Penn looked "out of place in the mofussil surroundings." Shubhra Gupta of The Indian Express noted that Chatterjee was effective in her role. India Today's Rohit Khilnani praised the director for "[capturing] everything that [the] drama needed". However, he felt that the overall quality of the film could have been better.

Bryan Durham of Daily News and Analysis praised the actors, particularly Martin Sheen, the costumes and sets used for the film. He considered Barton's character and Hinglish unnecessary. He also questioned how Rajpal's character was able to live for a longer period of time than others who were exposed to the gas, and how the doctor and nurses survived the whole disaster. He concluded that "the film takes [the] viewer for granted in places." Durham noted that the film had "its heart in the right place." Prasanna D. Zore of Rediff.com called Bhopal: A Prayer for Rain an "honest yet haunting film" and appreciated Anil Chandel's cinematography. Rajeev Masand of CNN-IBN praised Yadav, Sheen and Chatterjee for their acting. He criticised the film for its dialogues and Mischa Barton's role. He further noted that there was "a sense of drama in the final moments" but the film "has few moments that are extraordinary or even genuinely moving."

Martin Tsai of the Los Angeles Times wrote that the "cautionary tale could not be more relevant". Stephanie Merry of The Washington Post wrote that despite the terrible finale, the "movie never feels as powerful as it should." She felt that the dialogue, acting and music tended to be melodramatic but "the overt heartstring-pulling doesn't add much." In his review for The Hollywood Reporter, Frank Scheck praised Sheen's portrayal of Anderson and the visuals of the leakage but felt that the film is "slack in its tension". Writing for The New York Times, Ben Kenigsberg noted that the film "mines every chemical drip and gurgle for suspense."

== Box office ==
In the first three days of its release, the film grossed merely ₹900,000 (US$9,300) at the Indian box office. In its first weekend the film collected ₹7 million (US$73,000). At the United States domestic box office, the film grossed US$6,150 in its first weekend and a total of US$12,628. It grossed US$6,317 in its first week and US$6,311 in its second weekend.

== See also ==
- 2014 in film
- List of British films of 2014
- List of Bollywood films of 2014
- Bhopal Express (film)
