= Guru Sahay Lal =

Indian independence activist, and politician

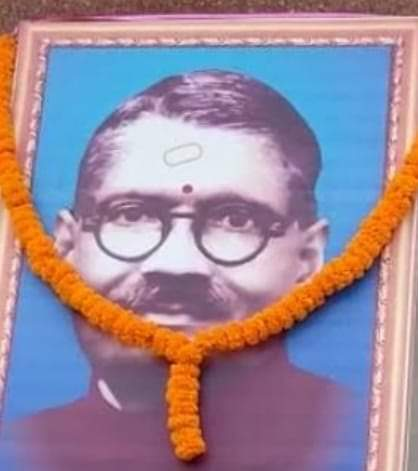

Revenue and Land Reform Minister, Bihar Province
- In office 1937
- Premier: Shri Krishna Sinha

Member of the Bihar Legislative Assembly
- In office 1937

Member of the Bihar and Orissa Legislative Council
- In office 1924

Personal details
- Born: 10 August 1890 Badi, Patna district, British India (present-day Nalanda district, Bihar, India)
- Died: 1949 (aged 58–59)
- Education: University of Calcutta
- Occupation: Politician, independence activist, lawyer, educationist
- Known for: Peasant rights advocacy, educational development in Bihar

Guru Sahay Lal (Hindi pronunciation: [ɡʊɾuː səɦaːj laːl]; 10 August 1890 – 1949) was an Indian independence activist, politician, educationist and peasant leader from Bihar. He served as the Revenue and Land Reform Minister in the provincial government of Bihar in 1937. He was Chairman of the Patna District Board for several years. He died in 1949.

== Early life and education ==
He was born on 10 August 1890 into a Ghamaila Kurmi family, in Badi village in present-day Nalanda district of Bihar, then part of Patna district in British India. He passed his matriculation in 1908 and intermediate exams in 1910. After graduating from the University of Calcutta, he took a teaching job at Patna Collegiate School. He soon left teaching to earn a law degree from the same university, and began practicing law in 1914.

== Career ==
After completing his education, Sahay Lal joined Mahatma Gandhi's Non-cooperation movement. He became involved in local administration, serving as the Vice-Chairman of the Patna District Board from 1922 to 1933, and later as its Chairman. He was elected to the Bihar and Orissa Legislative Council in 1924 and re-elected in 1927.

Lal was closely associated with peasant organisations and campaigns for agrarian rights. Following the 1937 provincial elections under the Government of India Act 1935, he became a member of the Bihar Legislative Assembly. He was appointed Revenue Minister in the first Congress-led provincial ministry under Shri Krishna Sinha. As minister, he advocated for land reform policies, rent reductions, and legal protections for tenant farmers against exploitative zamindari practices. He got an amendment to Section 12 passed by Parliament in New Delhi, which freed small cultivating farmers from the exploitation and oppression of zamindars.

As minister, Sahay Lal facilitated the approval and construction of multiple schools across Bihar. He helped establish Tek Narayan High School in Badi and middle schools in Kurmichak, Samyagarh, Kumhrar, Sarmera, Islampur, and Kundwapar in Nalanda district. He also directed the establishment of similar educational facilities across several other districts.

== Death and legacy ==
Guru Sahay Lal died in 1949. Institutions bearing his name include Guru Sahay Lal Inter College in Badi village and Guru Sahay Lal Bhawan in Patna. A statue of Lal has been installed at Amber Chowk in Bihar Sharif. The Guru Sahay Lal Community Hall in Rukanpura, Patna, and the Guru Sahay Lal Bhawan in Badi village are public facilities named in his honour.
