= Sunit Kumar =

Indian Police Service officer

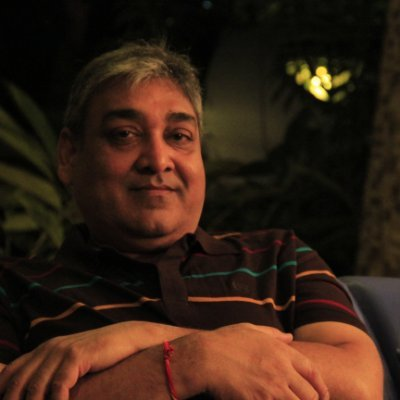
- Sunit Kumar

Chairman Bihar Police Subordinate Services Commission
- In office April 2017 – November 2020
- Succeeded by: K. S. Dwivedi, IPS (Retd.)

Director Bihar Police Academy
- In office February 2013 – November 2015

Director General of Police Bihar Police
- In office February 2013 – November 2015

Chairman Central Selection Board of Constable
- In office 2008 – November 2015

Personal details
- Born: 10 November 1955 (age 70) Jaunpur, Uttar Pradesh, India
- Education: BSc; MSc
- Alma mater: Patna Collegiate School, Patna; Patna Science College, Patna University
- Occupation: Bureaucrat
- Awards: President's Police Medal for Meritorious Service, 1998; President's Police Medal for Distinguished Service, 2010

Sunit Kumar (born 10 November 1955), is a retired Indian Police Service (I.P.S.) officer of Bihar cadre in India and served as Chairman of Bihar Police Subordinate Services Commission (BPSSC) in the state of Bihar from April 2017 to November 2020. He has also served as Director General of Police in the state of Bihar retiring from service in November 2015. He belongs to the I.P.S. batch of 1980. He has also served as Director of Bihar Police Academy and Chairman of the Bihar Central Selection Board of Constable (CSBC).

== Police career ==
Kumar belongs to the Bihar Cadre of the Indian Police Service (I.P.S.). He has served various districts of Bihar and Jharkhand (erstwhile part of Bihar) as Superintendent of Police. He has also served as Deputy Inspector General of Police (D.I.G.) of Patna Range and Inspector General of Police (I.G.) of Tirhut (Muzaffarpur) Zone.

Apart from active policing in the field Kumar has also served numerous departments of Bihar Police such as Special Branch (Secret Service of State Police), Bihar Military Police (B.M.P.), State Crime Records Bureau (S.C.R.B.), Criminal Investigation Department (C.I.D.) and Provisions.

As Superintendent of Police he has served various districts of Bihar and Jharkhand (erstwhile part of Bihar) such as Chaibasa, Naugachiya, Gopalganj, Samastipur, and Gumla etc.

== Bihar Police recruitment ==
From 2008 to November 2015, Kumar was Chairman of the Central Selection Board of Constable in Bihar and has handled recruitment of more than 32,500 Constables into Bihar Police. A number of recruitment drives were conducted by C.S.B.C in these years in order to strengthen the police force in the state. Kumar has been credited with conducting these recruitment drives in an efficient manner which has been marred with corruption in the past.

Apart from police recruitment he has also handled recruitment for Bihar Fire Services, Bihar Home Guards, and the Prisons Department. Around 1,000 firemen for Bihar Government were recruited by C.S.B.C under Kumar.

== Bihar Police Subordinate Services Commission ==
In March 2017 Kumar was appointed as the first Chairman of newly created Bihar Police Subordinate Services Commission (BPSSC) in an order issued by Home Department, Government of Bihar. The service commission was created in order to conduct recruitment examinations and fill vacancies for 19 posts of Group C employees in Government of Bihar and served their till November 2020.

== Awards and honours ==
Kumar has been awarded the President's Police Medal for Distinguished Service in 2010 on the eve of India's Independence Day. He was also awarded the President's Police Medal for Meritorious Service in 1998.

== Personal life ==
Kumar is married to Kavita Kumar and they have three children. He currently resides in Patna with his wife. Kumar's younger brother is veteran Bollywood actor Vineet Kumar.
