= Piyush Pandey =

Indian businessman (1955–2025)

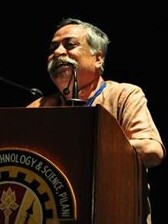
- Pandey in 2015
- Born: 5 September 1955; Jaipur, Rajasthan, India
- Died: 23 October 2025 (aged 70); Mumbai, Maharashtra, India
- Education: St. Stephen's College, Delhi (MA)
- Occupations: Advertising Professional; screenwriter
- Years active: 1982–2025
- Spouse: Nita Pandey (m. 2000)
- Relatives: Ila Arun (sister); Prasoon Pandey (Brother)

Piyush Pandey (5 September 1955 – 23 October 2025) was an Indian advertising professional and the Chief Creative Officer Worldwide (2019) and Executive Chairman India of Ogilvy. He was the recipient of the LIA Legend Award in 2024, and the Padma Shri in 2016. Pandey is also credited with shaping a distinct indigenous influence on Indian advertising that was earlier under the influence of western advertising and ideas.

== Early life and education ==
Pandey was born in Jaipur in 1955 in a family of nine children - seven daughters and two sons. His siblings include film director Prasoon Pandey and singer-actor Ila Arun. His father worked for the Rajasthan state cooperative bank. He played in the Ranji Trophy for the state of Rajasthan. He worked as a tea taster. Pandey studied at St. Xavier's School, Jaipur and had a Post Graduate in History from St Stephen's College, Delhi. He was married to Nita Pandey.

== Career ==
Pandey joined the ad industry as a client servicing executive at Ogilvy in 1982. Sunlight Detergent print ad was the first ad he ever wrote. After 6 years he got into the creative department where he created several notable ads like Luna moped, Fevicol, Cadbury and Asian paints. Three years later he was promoted to creative director, and then to national creative director. Pandey was nominated to the board of directors in 1994. Under his leadership, Ogilvy India has been ranked the No.1 Agency for 12 consecutive years in the Agency Reckoner, an independent Marketing & Advertising Survey conducted by The Economic Times. He was also the first jury President from Asia for the Cannes Lions Festival.

During his 40 years tenure at Ogilvy & Mather became the largest advertising agency in India, and Ogilvy India is considered one of the most creative offices in the Ogilvy worldwide network. In September 2006, Pandey was nominated to the Ogilvy Worldwide board. He mentored creative executives from around the world at the Berlin School of Creative Leadership.

In September 2023, Ogilvy announced a major leadership change with Piyush Pandey stepping down to transition into the role of Chief Advisor at the agency, effective from 1 January 2024.

== Advertising campaigns and contributions ==
Notable ad campaigns in India designed by Pandey include:

- Abki baar Modi sarkar - BJP 2014 election campaign, with the famous slogan "Achche Din Aane Wale Hain"
- Polio ad campaign with Amitabh Bachchan
- Fevicol ad campaigns - Fevicol Bus, Fevicol Fish, fevicol sofa
- Fevikwik ad campaigns such as "Todo Nahin, Jodo"
- Googly Woogly Woosh - Ponds Ad (2010).
- Chal Meri Luna
- Cadbury Dairy Milk ad campaigns like "Kuch Khaas Hai"
- Asian Paints ad campaigns like "Har Ghar Kuch Kehta Hai"
- Campaigns for Indian tourism
- Bell Bajao ad campaign
- Anti-smoking campaign for the Cancer Patients Association
- Rath Vanaspati
- Fortune Oil
- Google - Reunion
- The Hindu
- Gujarat Tourism campaigns

He also wrote the Indian patriotic song "Mile Sur Mera Tumhara" for the National Integration campaign in 1988 and co-wrote the screenplay for Bhopal Express.

== Death ==
Pandey died on 23 October 2025, at the age of 70.

== Books ==
Pandey wrote books including:

- Pandeymonium (2015)
- Open House with Piyush Pandey (2022)

== Acting ==
Pandey appeared in the John Abraham and Nargis Fakhri film Madras Cafe as the cabinet secretary and in Magic Pencil Project videos (a marketing campaign by ICICI Bank).

== Awards and achievements ==
Pandey won a number of awards. He was named the most influential man in Indian advertising for eight consecutive years by The Economic Times. In 2000, the Ad Club of Mumbai voted his commercial for Fevikwik the commercial of the century and his work for Cadbury the campaign of the century. Pandey was voted Asia's Creative Person of the Year at the Media Asia Awards 2002. He is the only Indian to win a double gold at Cannes (for his Cancer Patients Association anti-smoking campaign) and a triple grand prize at the London International Awards. During Pandey's tenure, O&M India won 25 lions at Cannes. In 2002, he won India's first Silver Pencil at The One Show Awards.

He was invited to be a jury member on the 2000 Clio Awards, at the 2002 Cannes Film Festival and was the first Asian jury president for outdoor and press and film at the 2004 Cannes Lions International Advertising Festival. He was invited to judge the 2007 Asia Pacific Advertising Festival Awards. Pandey received a lifetime achievement award in 2010 from the Advertising Agencies Association of India. Piyush Pandey won a Clio Lifetime Achievement Award for outstanding work and creative achievements in 2012. The Government of India awarded him the civilian honour of the Padma Shri in 2016. In 2026 he has been awarded with Padma Bhushan.

In June 2018, Piyush Pandey and his brother Prasoon Pandey (Corcoise Films) won the Lions lifetime achievement award of St Mark at Cannes Advertising Festival, France.

WPP agency Ogilvy promoted Piyush Pandey, executive chairman and creative director, Ogilvy South Asia, as its worldwide chief creative officer.

By this move, the company filled up a key position that was lying vacant since the exit of its erstwhile creative head Tham Khai Meng in July. The appointment took effect from 1 January.
