= Jesse Randhawa =

Indian model and actress (born 1975)

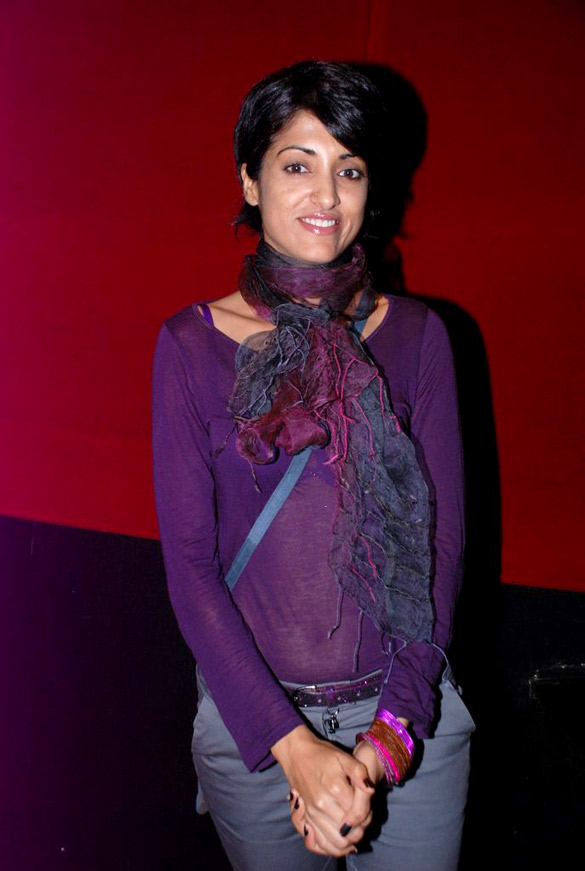
- Jesse Randhawa in 2012
- Born: 11 August 1975 (age 51); Jaipur, Rajasthan, India
- Spouse(s): Inder Mohan Sudan (divorced) Sandip Soparrkar (m. 2009; div. 2016)
- Relatives: Saadhika (sister)

Jesse Randhawa (born 11 August 1975) is an Indian model and actress. She was a contestant on Fear Factor: Khatron Ke Khiladi 2 where she emerged as the 1st runner-up.

== Early life ==
Jasmeet Kaur Randhawa, a.k.a. Jesse Randhawa, was born on 11 August 1975 in Jaipur to Mehar and Narinder Singh Randhawa. She is originally from Jaipur.

Her sister Saadhika is a popular actress.

== Career ==
Randhawa is a successful model and has worked with many designers. She appeared in Femina Miss India 1994 contest along with Sushmita Sen and Aishwarya Rai and made it to the finals. She also participated in Fear Factor: Khatron Ke Khiladi 2, where she emerged as the 1st runner-up.

=== Film career ===
Firstly, she featured in a song Kadi Te Aana Balli Di Gali for the movie Jung starring Sanjay Dutt and Jackie Shroff. She did an item number for the film No Smoking. In 2009, Randhawa appeared in Anurag Kashyap's film Gulaal, in which she played the role of a young lecturer.

== Personal life ==
Randhawa was previously married to fashion model Inder Mohan Sudan, but divorced him later. She and choreographer Sandip Soparrkar began dating in 2004, and also guest-starred in Dance India Dance Grand Finale in 2006. They married on 12 December 2009 and announced their separation in 2016.

== Filmography ==
- Chot- Aj Isko, Kal Tereko as Kabir's girlfriend
- Sona Spa as Villain
- Love Khichdi as Susan Raj
- Gulaal as Anuja
- Fashion as Model Jasmeet
- No Smoking as Dancer/Singer
- Jung
- The Xpose as Shabnam
- SuperCops Vs Super Villains as Interpol agent Maria
