= Fagun Thakrar =

English actress (born 1983)

Fagun
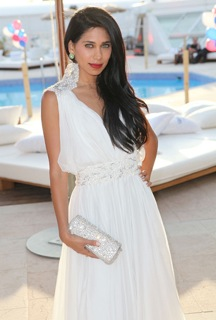
- Fagun at the Annual 64th Cannes Film Festival
- Born: Leicester, Leicestershire, England, UK
- Education: University of Cambridge University College London Medical School, Royal Central School of Speech and Drama, London College of Fashion
- Occupations: Actress, director, writer, producer, global ambassador, activist, fashion designer, philanthropist,
- Years active: Since 2011

Fagun Thakrar is an English actress, writer-director, founder, social entrepreneur and activist. Fagun has appeared in several British, American, and Indian cinema. Fagun is the founder and CEO of the Purpose Movie Studio. Fagun is involved in many global non-profit organizations, particularly in initiatives related to global health and holistic well-being. She also established the Creatively Inspired Life Foundation. In March 2023, Fagun was selected as a Young Global Leader by the World Economic Forum, recognizing her as one of the world's most promising leaders.

== Early life ==
Fagun was born in Leicester, Leicestershire, England. She studied at Beauchamp College in Oadby.

Fagun has studied five degrees at internationally renowned universities. Initially Fagun moved to London to study medicine at University College London. Later, she diversified her education by training in classical acting at the Royal Central School of Speech and Drama (RCSSD) and the Royal Academy of Dramatic Art (RADA) in London and pursued film directing studies in the US. She also holds a master's degree from the London College of Fashion. Subsequently, Fagun acquired an MBA to broaden her scope in the business sector. She has further advanced her academic qualifications by earning a fifth degree from the University of Cambridge.

Fagun's educational achievements was chronicled in a special segment for ITV News for maintaining her "straight A" record under a particularly challenging course load in high school and college.

== Film career ==
=== Acting ===
Whilst studying, Fagun competed against thousands of contestants and won BBC's Bolly Idol, an adoption of Pop and America idol after which she was offered her first lead stage role.

For her first cinematic role, Fagun starred as Nabeela in the film, Brick Lane, shot on location in London. She then played Mandy Edge for the long running BBC hospital TV series, Holby City. Her acting roles include the title part of Zohra and the lead part of Deepa Verma, in the thriller Blood and Curry. Fagun portrayed Rekha opposite Martin Sheen and Kal Penn in the American film Bhopal: Prayer for Rain.

She attended the Cannes Film Festival in 2011. She was hand-picked by internationally acclaimed film director Shekhar Kapur for the premiere of the movie Bollywood, The Greatest Love Story Ever Told.

In addition to her acting credits on film, Fagun has performed in several Shakespeare plays, including as Juliet in Romeo and Juliet. She has also appeared in commercials representing L'Oréal, IBM and Vodafone.

=== Writing and directing ===
As a writer and director Fagun intends to focus on films about social issues.

Fagun is currently directing a documentary How Our Brains Are Affected by Meditation.

== Non-profit activities ==
=== Global activism ===
Fagun was appointed as the Global Ambassador for The International Forum Advocating for Women's Brain and Health, which holds an annual meeting in Zurich, Switzerland. The organization unites experts and representatives from various scientific disciplines and practice fields, with the aim of advancing the study and enhancement of brain and mental health.

Fagun founded The Creatively Inspired Life Foundation, a non-profit organization to help young people to overcome barriers through the power of creativity.

Fagun served as the international spokeswoman for SAHARA (South Asian Helpline And Referral Agency), a culturally sensitive organization that supports women in Southern California through personal crisis.

Fagun continues to work with The United Nations and Amnesty International, among other global organizations

== Awards and honors ==
The British Academy of Film and Television Arts (BAFTA) honored Fagun on their selective Newcomers Program, awarded to international rising stars.

Fagun was awarded the Leicester Arts Achievement Award for her contribution and supporting young people in the arts.

Fagun's career achievements were featured alongside those of actors, including Dame Judi Dench, in a historical book on British actors on stage and cinema over the past eight decades.
