= Bihar Police Academy =

Police school in Rajgir, Bihar

- Founded: 3 December 2018
- Type: Civil Service training institute
- Legal status: Active
- Purpose: Training of Bihar Police Service Officers; Training of Bihar Police Personnel
- Location: Rajgir, Bihar
- Region served: Bihar
- Members: Bihar Police Service Officers; Bihar Police Personnel
- Director General: Bhrigu Srinivasan IPS
- Parent organisation: Government of Bihar
- Website: http://bpa.bihar.gov.in/

Bihar Police Academy is the civil service institute for training of Bihar Police Service Officers and Bihar Police in the state of Bihar. The academy's new campus is located in Rajgir.

The academy is the state civil service training institution for Bihar Police Service Officers and Bihar Police in the state of Bihar. The institute provides training to new police recruits and current police employees in the ranks of Deputy Superintendent of Police/Assistant Commandant/Assistant Commissioner of Police and above ranks of Bihar Police Service and also to ranks below it such as Inspector of Police, Sub Inspector of Police, Assistant Sub Inspector of Police, Head Constable and Constable under Bihar Police. It also provides training in various fields to serving state police officers.

== History ==
In undivided Bihar, the Police Academy was located in Hazaribagh imparting training to state police officers. On 15 November 2000, Hazaribagh became a part of Jharkhand. This left Bihar without a Police Academy and the officers were getting trained at Constable Training School at Nathnagar, Bhagalpur.

== New campus ==
After loss of Police Academy to Jharkhand, Government of Bihar started the process to set up a new campus for Bihar Police Academy in Rajgir, Bihar. The academy was inaugurated on 3 December 2018 by chief minister shri Nitish Kumar. The budget for the new campus is Rs. 206 Crores and the area of the campus is 133 acres. The campus is being built as a Green building. The campus also includes an auditorium with the capacity to seat 1,500 and two huge parade grounds - one ceremonial and another for practice.

== Training ==
The Bihar Police Academy trains officers of the Bihar Police, who have been selected through Examination conducted by Bihar Public Service Commission and Bihar Police Subordinate Services Commission. The trained officers are then posted in their respective ranks in various parts of the states under whom the other sub-ranks of police force work. The recruitment of sub-ranks such as constables and other subordinate positions are done by various commissions in the state. The academy has capacity to train 2,200 sub-inspector and 200 DSP-rank officers.

== Organisation ==
The Academy is headed by a Director, an IPS officer of the rank of Additional Director General of Police (3-star rank).

== See also ==
- Bihar Police
- Indian Police Service
- Sardar Vallabhbhai Patel National Police Academy
- Law enforcement in India
- Indian Police Foundation and Institute
- Bureau of Police Research and Development
