= Bardaasht =

2004 Indian film by Eeshwar Nivas

- Movie poster for Bardaasht
- Directed by: Eeshwar Nivas
- Written by: Vikram Bhatt; Girish Dhamija
- Produced by: Vijay Galani
- Starring: Bobby Deol; Lara Dutta; Ritesh Deshmukh; Shivaji Satam; Tara Sharma; Rahul Dev
- Cinematography: Rakesh Manikanthan
- Edited by: Aarif Sheikh
- Music by: Himesh Reshammiya
- Production company: Film Folks
- Release date: 23 April 2004
- Running time: 153 minutes
- Country: India
- Language: Hindi

Bardaasht (transl. Tolerance) is a 2004 Indian Hindi-language vigilante action-thriller film directed by Eeshwar Nivas and written by Vikram Bhatt. The film stars Bobby Deol, Lara Dutta, Ritesh Deshmukh, Tara Sharma, and Rahul Dev, with Vishwajeet Pradhan, Ganesh Yadav, Nagesh Bhonsle, Shivaji Satam, and Virendra Saxena in supporting roles. The film focuses on the issue of police brutality.

== Plot ==
Aditya Shrivastava is a court martialled army officer. He has a brother, Anuj Shrivastava. Anuj gets angry at Aditya one day and runs away. Corrupt ACP Yashwant Thakur helps Aditya find Anuj and later tells him that Anuj was killed in an encounter.

Aditya reads a police report which states that Anuj was running away with drugs and was shot dead on the spot. Aditya can't quite believe this, so he investigates it. He later meets Anuj's traumatised girlfriend Ramona, who reveals that ACP Yashwant Thakur and his two other police officers brutally killed Anuj for no apparent reason and lied to cover it up.

Aditya wants to take the matter to court and chooses Payal as his lawyer. However, after losing the case, Aditya decides to take matters into his own hands by holding and torturing the three captives until they confess their crime. He is successful and, having secretly recorded this evidence, shows it to the police commissioner; thus avenging his brother's death as the culprits are arrested. The last scene shows Aditya performing the final rites of Anuj.

== Cast ==
- Bobby Deol as Major Aditya Srivastav, an ex-army officer.
- Lara Dutta as Advocate Payal, Aditya's fiancé.
- Riteish Deshmukh as Anuj Srivastav, Aditya's younger brother.
- Tara Sharma as Ramona Saxena, Anuj's girlfriend.
- Rahul Dev as ACP Yashwant Thakur, the main antagonist.
- Shivaji Satam as Police Commissioner
- Vishwajeet Pradhan as Inspector Deepak Sawant
- Virendra Saxena as Constable Mehmood
- Aanjjan Srivastav as Dinanth Srivastav, Aditya's and Anuj's father. (special appearance)
- Surendra Pal as Payal's father
- Raju Kher as A. Saxena, Ramona's father.
- Naresh Suri as College Principal
- Ganesh Yadav as Inspector Sunil Yadav
- Nagesh Bhonsle as Advocate
- Harsh Chhaya as Psychiatrist
- Ashwin Kumar as Amit Chhabra
- Kunal S. Kapur as Mohit Varshney
- Chandrashekhar Gautam as Karan Bhanushali
- Shruti Ulfat as Priya Agnihotri
- Avni Mehta as Maya Chauhan
- Gopal K Singh as Man at the morgue

== Critical reception ==
Released in April 2004 Bardaasht received acclaimed critical reception. Taran Adarsh of Bollywood Hungama praised Bobby Deol's performance and wrote, "Bardaasht is a triumph for Bobby Deol, who takes full advantage of the role offered to him and gives his best shot. He displays the gamut of emotions like a seasoned performer and delivers a knock-out performance. In fact, it won't be wrong to state that this is amongst Bobby's best performance to date!" Critic Subash K Jha praised the film wrote, "At a time when the film industry is busy showcasing cops as romanticised idealistic super-heroes, "Bardaasht" takes a cynical view of the police force. But the film portrays the reality. Every day law-abiding god-fearing citizen gets a taste of the criminalisation of the police force." Jha praises Deol's performance and writes, "Bobby Deol, who plays the lead role, drops his habitually languorous look and laidback demeanour to deliver a performance of substantial velocity. Deol makes the best of his silently simmering and suffering army man-turned-civilian role. As Aditya Shrivastava, Bobby is what his brother Sunny has repeatedly played in films like "Arjun" and "Ghayal". But Bobby gives the seething role his own spin." Rediff.com praises Bardaasht and writes "Bardaasht is pretty strong on the performance front. Bobby Deol does a good job. Look out for him in the scene where he sees his kid brother's dead body. His body language is frail, broken and numb," citing Deol's power-packed performance.

== Soundtrack ==
Bardaasht

Soundtrack album by Himesh Reshammiya
- Released: 23 April 2004 (India)
- Recorded: 2004
- Venue: Mumbai
- Genre: Feature film soundtrack
- Producer: Himesh Reshammiya

Himesh Reshammiya chronology
Tum – A Dangerous Obsession (2004)	Bardaasht (2004)	Run (2004)

The soundtrack was composed by Himesh Reshammiya, with lyrics by Sameer.

#	Title	Singer(s)
1	"Silsile Mulaqaton Ke"	Udit Narayan, Alka Yagnik
2	"Janaabe Ali"	Shaan, Kunal Ganjawala, Jayesh Gandhi
3	"Aap Ki Khata Aap Ki Bewafayee"	Shaan, Alka Yagnik
4	"Na Na Na Na Re"	Kunal Ganjawala, Alisha Chinai
5	"Dil Mera Dil Na Maane"	Alka Yagnik, Udit Narayan
