= Khatron Ke Khiladi (TV series) =

Indian stunt based reality television series

- Genre: Action; Reality
- Based on: Fear Factor
- Presented by: Akshay Kumar (Seasons 1, 2, 4); Priyanka Chopra (Season 3); Rohit Shetty (Seasons 5–6, 8 present); Arjun Kapoor (Season 7)
- Starring: See below
- Country of origin: India
- Original language: Hindi
- No. of seasons: 15
- No. of episodes: 302

Production
- Production locations: South Africa (Season 1–2, 4–6, 11–13, 15); Brazil (Season 3); Argentina (Seasons 7, 9); Spain (Season 8); Bulgaria (Season 10); Romania (Season 14)
- Camera setup: Multi-camera
- Running time: around 120 minutes
- Production companies: Sphere Origins (season 1); Endemol Shine India (season 2— present)

Original release
- Network: Colors TV
- Release: 21 July 2008 – present

Related
- Khatron Ke Khiladi – Made in India

Khatron Ke Khiladi (transl. Players of Danger), marketed as Fear Factor: Khatron Ke Khiladi, is an Indian Hindi-language stunt-based reality television series based on the American series Fear Factor. First launched as Fear Factor India on Sony TV, the format was sold by Endemol's domestic division after the second season to Colors TV, becoming Fear Factor: Khatron Ke Khiladi on 21 July 2008. A spin-off of the main series Khatron Ke Khiladi: Made in India was launched on 1 August 2020 where contestants from previous years participated.

In April 2025, the production company of the show, Banijay Entertainment, pulled out from producing the show at the last minute, leaving its future uncertain until later that year. In May 2026, the next and current season of the show was announced, premiering online in August of the same year on JioHotstar.

== Series overview ==
Series	Host	Destination	Episodes	Originally released		Contestants	Winner	Runner-up
Series	Host	Destination	Episodes	First released	Last released	Contestants	Winner	Runner-up
1	Akshay Kumar	South Africa	16	21 July 2008	14 August 2008	12	Nethra Raghuraman	Urvashi Sharma
2	Akshay Kumar	South Africa	16	7 September 2009	1 October 2009	13	Anushka Manchanda	Jesse Randhawa
3	Priyanka Chopra	Brazil	16	6 September 2010	30 September 2010	13	Shabir Ahluwalia	Ritwik Bhattacharya
4	Akshay Kumar	South Africa	16	3 June 2011	23 July 2011	13	Aarti Chhabria	Mauli Dave
5	Rohit Shetty	South Africa	20	22 March 2014	25 May 2014	17	Rajneesh Duggal	Gurmeet Choudhary
6	Rohit Shetty	South Africa	20	7 February 2015	12 April 2015	15	Aashish Chaudhary	Meiyang Chang
7	Arjun Kapoor	Argentina	20	30 January 2016	3 April 2016	15	Sidharth Shukla	Sana Saeed
8	Rohit Shetty	Spain	21	22 July 2017	30 September 2017	12	Shantanu Maheshwari	Hina Khan
9	Rohit Shetty	Argentina	20	5 January 2019	10 March 2019	12	Punit Pathak	Aditya Narayan
10	Rohit Shetty	Bulgaria	22	22 February 2020	26 July 2020	10	Karishma Tanna	Karan Patel
11	Rohit Shetty	South Africa	22	17 July 2021	26 September 2021	13	Arjun Bijlani	Divyanka Tripathi
12	Rohit Shetty	South Africa	26	2 July 2022	25 September 2022	14	Tushar Kalia	Faisal Shaikh
13	Rohit Shetty	South Africa	27	15 July 2023	14 October 2023	14	Dino James	Arjit Taneja
14	Rohit Shetty	Romania	20	27 July 2024	29 September 2024	12	Karan Veer Mehra	Krishna Shroff
15	Rohit Shetty	South Africa	20	1 August 2026	4 October 2026	13	Avinash Mishra	Rithvik Dhanjani

=== Spin-off ===
Series	Host	Episodes	Originally released		Contestants	Winner	Runner-up	Destination
Series	Host	Episodes	First released	Last released	Contestants	Winner	Runner-up	Destination
1	Farah Khan; Rohit Shetty	10	1 August 2020	30 August 2020	9	Nia Sharma	Karan Wahi	India

== Season 1 ==
Khatron Ke Khiladi
- Season 1
- Title screen
- Presented by: Akshay Kumar
- No. of contestants: 13
- Winner: Nethra Raghuraman
- Runner-up: Urvashi Sharma
- No. of episodes: 16

Release
- Original network: Colors TV
- Original release: 21 July – 14 August 2008

Season chronology
- Next → Season 2

Khatron Ke Khiladi 1 was hosted by Akshay Kumar. Nethra Raghuraman was declared the winner of the season.

Contestants	Occupation	Status	Place
Nethra Raghuraman	Actress	Winner	1
Urvashi Sharma	Actress	1st runner-up	2
Aditi Govitrikar	Model	2nd runner-up	3
Pooja Bedi	Actress	Eliminated	4
Yana Gupta	Model	Eliminated	5
Yana Gupta	Model	Eliminated	5
Sonali Kulkarni	Actress	Eliminated	6
Sonali Kulkarni	Actress	Eliminated	6
Anjana Sukhani	Actress	Eliminated	7
Meghna Naidu	Actress	Eliminated	8
Meghna Naidu	Actress	Eliminated	8
Dipannita Sharma	Actress	Eliminated	9
Dipannita Sharma	Actress	Eliminated	9
Anita Hassanandani	Actress	Eliminated	10
Tapur Chatterjee	Actress	Eliminated	11
Tupur Chatterjee	Model	Eliminated	12
Vidya Malvade	Actress	Eliminated	13

Indicates original entrants
Indicates re-entered entrants

== Season 2 ==
Khatron Ke Khiladi
- Season 2
- Title screen
- Presented by: Akshay Kumar
- No. of contestants: 13
- Winner: Anushka Manchanda
- Runner-up: Jesse Randhawa
- No. of episodes: 16

Release
- Original network: Colors TV
- Original release: 7 September – 1 October 2009

Season chronology
- ← Previous; Season 1 Next → Season 3

Khatron Ke Khiladi 2 was hosted by Akshay Kumar. Anushka Manchanda was declared the winner of the season.

Contestants	Occupation	Status	Place
Anushka Manchanda	Singer	Winner	1
Jesse Randhawa	Model	1st runner-up	2
Carol Gracias	Model	Eliminated	3
Carol Gracias	Model	2nd runner-up	3
Rosa Catalano	Model	Eliminated	4
Rosa Catalano	Model	Eliminated	4
Nauheed Cyrusi	Actress	Eliminated	5
Shonali Nagrani	Actress	Eliminated	6
Shonali Nagrani	Actress	Eliminated	6
Bruna Abdullah	Model	Eliminated	7
Bruna Abdullah	Model	Eliminated	7
Sonika Kaliraman	Wrestler	Eliminated	8
Shweta Salve	Actress	Eliminated	9
Mandira Bedi	Actress	Eliminated	10
Rupali Ganguly	Actress	Eliminated	11
Pia Trivedi	Model	Eliminated	12
Sushama Reddy	Actress	Eliminated	13

Indicates original entrants
Indicates re-entered entrants

== Season 3 ==
Khatron Ke Khiladi
- Season 3
- Title screen
- Presented by: Priyanka Chopra
- No. of contestants: 13
- Winner: Shabir Ahluwalia
- Runner-up: Ritwik Bhattacharya
- No. of episodes: 16

Release
- Original network: Colors TV
- Original release: 6 September – 30 September 2010

Season chronology
- ← Previous; Season 2 Next → Season 4

Khatron Ke Khiladi 3 was hosted by Priyanka Chopra. Shabir Ahluwalia was declared the winner of the season.

Contestants	Occupation	Partner	Status	Place
Shabir Ahluwalia	Actor	Sushma Gupta	Winner	1
Ritwik Bhattacharya	Squash player	Avni	1st runner-up	2
Dino Morea	Actor	Madhurima Tuli	2nd runner-up	3
Milind Soman	Model	Ritisha	Eliminated	4
Milind Soman	Model	Ritisha	Eliminated	4
Manjot Singh	Actor	Andressa	Eliminated	5
Manjot Singh	Actor	Andressa	Eliminated	5
Abhishek Kapoor	Producer	Susheel	Eliminated	6
Rahul Bose	Actor	Annie Gill	Eliminated	7
Terence Lewis	Dancer	Ananya Kapoor	Eliminated	8
Karan Singh Grover	Actor	Aarti	Eliminated	9
Karan Singh Grover	Actor	Aarti	Eliminated	9
Cyrus Broacha	VJ	Freisha	Eliminated	10
Cyrus Broacha	VJ	Freisha	Eliminated	10
Armaan Ebrahim	Car Racer	Madhura Naik	Eliminated	11
Rahul Dev	Actor	Kavita Sachdev	Eliminated	12
Angad Bedi	Model	Mittal	Eliminated	13

Indicates original entrants
Indicates re-entered entrants

== Season 4 ==
Khatron Ke Khiladi 4 was hosted by Akshay Kumar. The tagline for this season was "Torchaar 4". Aarti Chhabria was declared the winner of the season.

== Season 5 ==
Khatron Ke Khiladi 5 was hosted by Rohit Shetty The tagline for this season was "Darr Ka Blockbuster". Rajneesh Duggal was declared the winner of the season.

== Season 6 ==
Khatron Ke Khiladi 6 was hosted by Rohit Shetty. The tagline for this season was "Darr Ka Blockbuster Returns". Aashish Chaudhary was declared the winner of the season.

== Season 7 ==
Khatron Ke Khiladi 7 was hosted by Arjun Kapoor. The tagline for this season was "Kabhi पीड़ा Kabhi कीड़ा in Argentina". Sidharth Shukla was declared the winner of the season.

== Season 8 ==
Khatron Ke Khiladi 8 was hosted by Rohit Shetty. The tagline for this season was "Pain in Spain". Shantanu Maheshwari was declared the winner of the season.

== Season 9 ==
Khatron Ke Khiladi 9 was hosted by Rohit Shetty. The tagline for this season was "Jigar Pe Trigger". Punit Pathak was declared as winner of the season.

== Season 10 ==
Khatron Ke Khiladi 10 was hosted by Rohit Shetty. The tagline for this season was "Jahaan Darr Lega Class Aur Dega Trass". The telecast was postponed for 3 months due to COVID-19 pandemic. Week 7 episodes started from 27 June. Karishma Tanna was declared as the winner of the season 10.

== Season 11 ==
Khatron Ke Khiladi 11 was hosted by Rohit Shetty. The tagline for this season was "Darr VS Dare". Arjun Bijlani was declared as winner of the season.

== Season 12 ==
Khatron Ke Khiladi 12 was hosted by Rohit Shetty. The tagline for this season was "Bach Ke Kahan Jayega? Khatra Kahin Se Bhi Aayega!". The show premiered on 2 July 2022, on Colors TV. Tushar Kalia was declared as winner of the season.

== Season 13 ==
Khatron Ke Khiladi 13 was hosted by Rohit Shetty. The tagline for this season was "Iss Baar Har Level, Darr Next Level". The show premiered on 15 July 2023, on Colors TV. Spanning over 27 episodes, it is the longest season of the series since its inception. Dino James was declared as winner of the season.

== Season 14 ==
Khatron Ke Khiladi 14 was hosted by Rohit Shetty. The tagline for this season is "Darr Ki Nayi Kahaaniyaan In Romania". The show premiered on 27 July 2024, on Colors TV and digitally on JioCinema. Karan Veer Mehra was declared as the winner of the season.

== Season 15 ==
Khatron Ke Khiladi 15 is hosted by Rohit Shetty. The tagline for this season is "Darr Ka Naya Daur". The show premiered on 1 August 2026, on Colors TV and digitally on JioHotstar. Avinash Mishra was declared as the winner of the season.
