= Mast (film) =

1999 film by Ram Gopal Varma

- Poster
- Directed by: Ram Gopal Varma
- Written by: Vinod Ranganathan; Ramesh Khatkar
- Produced by: Ram Gopal Varma
- Starring: Urmila Matondkar; Aftab Shivdasani; Antara Mali
- Cinematography: Piyush Shah
- Edited by: Chandan Arora; Ashok Honda
- Music by: Sandeep Chowta
- Production company: Varma Corporation
- Distributed by: Eros International; B4U Entertainment
- Release date: 15 October 1999
- Running time: 153 minutes
- Country: India
- Language: Hindi

Mast (transl. Enchanted, Carefree, Fun) is a 1999 Indian Hindi-language musical romance film directed by Ram Gopal Varma. The film stars Aftab Shivdasani in his debut as a lead actor alongside Urmila Matondkar. Shivdasani won the Star Screen Award for Most Promising Newcomer – Male for his performance.

== Plot ==
Kittu is an arts student in Pune and is madly in love with actress and film star Malika. He has posters up on his wall and goes to all of her movies and even fantasizes that she is there with him when he is watching these items, something which his sister often witnesses. His father, concerned with his son's declining exam scores, confronts Kittu on his obsession on learning of it from his daughter and later tears down every poster. To Kittu, this is almost as bad as murder, and decides to move out and travels to Mumbai, where the star, herself, lives.

Unknowing of where to go, he goes to her bungalow, but the security guard shoos him away. He finds a job at a nearby cafe. After interacting with Malika, Kittu soon finds that she is not the girl that he had pictured from her posters and movies. Being a simple orphan, exploited by her evil uncle and his family, Kittu begins to feel sorry for her and even more in love although for an unknown reason she does not report her uncle's actions to the police.

A series of events lead him to the point where he decides to convince her to run away with him. But with her being such a famous icon, Kittu soon finds it harder than he had thought to get away. The police are looking for her as is her uncle, although upon reunion with his family, they are relieved at his return and Kittu makes amends with his father. When Kittu's mother and sister learn of Mallika having accompanied him so she could escape from her uncle, they understand her plight and take her in. They soon help Malika enjoy her newfound freedom.

Things take a turn for the worse when Mr. Mathur is taken into custody for allegedly housing the "kidnapped" Malika. The police beat Kittu for information. Malika gains the courage to turn herself in so that she can save them, and she tells the cops that Kittu rescued her and that her uncle is the one who has ill-treated her. The police then take her uncle into custody and whack him before ordering him to leave her alone forever.

Malika then returns home, leaving Kittu to his life with his family and Nisha believing that they are in love. Kittu returns home as well and is devastated that she left him without an explanation or goodbye. They visit her on set one day to see that she has returned to her old life, uncle-free, but this meeting is an uncomfortable one. Through her awkward goodbye, Kittu then realizes that she believes that Kittu is going to marry Nisha.

After this realization, he then runs to Malika's dressing room from the cab to tell her of his love and the fact that she has assumed wrong. They have a heartfelt conversation of love and life, and Malika goes on to explain that she thinks that Nisha and Kittu have a love that she cannot come between. She then asks him not to see her anymore and he runs to Nisha to tell her of this belief. After hearing this, Nisha explains the situation that she loves Kittu, but Kittu has always been in love with Malika at which Malika and Kittu embrace.

The closing scene shows that they get married and everyone who supported both of them in the story are present, including his coworkers from the cafe and the taxi driver.

== Cast ==
- Aftab Shivdasani as Krishnakant Mathur ''Kittu''
- Urmila Matondkar as Mallika
- Dalip Tahil as Mr. Mathur, Kittu's father
- Smita Jaykar as Mrs. Mathur, Kittu's mother
- Govind Namdev as Mallika's uncle
- Antara Mali as Nisha
- Neeraj Vora as Usman Bhai
- Raju Mavani as Police Inspector
- Snehal Dabi as Autowala
- Sheetal Suvarna as Nikki Mathur, Kittu's sister

== Soundtrack ==
Mast

Soundtrack album by Sandeep Chowta
- Released: 24 July 1999
- Genre: Feature film soundtrack
- Label: Venus Records & Tapes

All songs were composed by Sandeep Chowta and written by Nitin Raikwar.

#	Title	Singer(s)
1	"Mast"	Sandeep Chowta
2	"Ruki Ruki"	Sonu Nigam, Sunidhi Chauhan
3	"Aasman Kehta Hai Rab Se"	Sonu Nigam
4	"Pucho Na Yaar"	Sonu Nigam, Sadhana Sargam
5	"Hey Rama Krishna Govinda Gopala"	Asha Bhosle
6	"Suna Tha"	Sonu Nigam, Sunidhi Chauhan
7	"Main Mast"	Sunidhi Chauhan
8	"Main Tere Dil Ki Malika"	Sonu Nigam, Asha Bhosle
9	"Na Govinda Na Shah Rukh"	Asha Bhosle

== Reception ==
=== Critical response ===
Faisal Shariff of Rediff.com wrote, "Yes, a must see. If not for the storyline, if not for Urmila Matondkar, if not for the music, then because most of us, somewhere within, nurture this secret fantasy of realising our wildest dreams. And that is what Mast is all about. Realising a dream."

=== Box office ===
The film grossed ₹10.35 crore against a budget of ₹4.5 crore. Boxofficeindia.com called it a "Box office flop" while Anupama Chopra wrote that the film "died an agonisingly quick death at the box office."

=== Accolades ===
List of awards and nominations
Award	Ceremony	Category	Recipient(s)	Result	Ref(s)
Screen Awards	6th Screen Awards	Best Male Debut	Aftab Shivdasani	Won	
Screen Awards	6th Screen Awards	Best Supporting Actress	Antara Mali	Nominated	
Screen Awards	6th Screen Awards	Best Female Playback	Sunidhi Chauhan – "Ruki Ruki"	Nominated	
