= Yahan Sabhi Gyani Hain =

Indian comedy drama film

- Directed by: Anant Narain Tripathi
- Written by: Anant Narain Tripathi
- Produced by: Siddhartha Sharma
- Starring: Atul Srivastava; Neeraj Sood; Apoorva Arora
- Cinematography: Shirish Desai
- Edited by: Rajesh Pandey
- Music by: Sadhu Tiwari
- Distributed by: Shemaroo Entertainment
- Release date: 7 February 2020
- Country: India
- Language: Hindi

Yahan Sabhi Gyani Hain is a 2020 Indian Hindi-language comedy-drama film directed by Anant Narain Tripathi and produced by Siddhartha Sharma under Ulterior Vision Productions. The film stars Atul Srivastava, Neeraj Sood, and Apoorva Arora. It was released on 7 February 2020, to mixed reviews and follows a superstitious family searching for hidden treasure.

== Plot summary ==
Pappu Tiwari (Atul Srivastava) sustains his family by selling off ancestral properties. Upon learning of a hidden treasure on his last remaining piece of land, he becomes determined to find it. Concurrently, his daughter Goldie (Apoorva Arora), a local news anchor, faces an arranged marriage to a politician's son, orchestrated by her parents in the belief that it will improve their fortunes. As the treasure hunt intensifies, Goldie challenges her parents' superstitions and decisions.

== Cast and characters ==
- Atul Srivastava as Pappu Tiwari
- Neeraj Sood as Laddu
- Apoorva Arora as Goldie Tiwari
- Meena Nathani as Manju
- Vineet Kumar as Kinni bhaiya MLA
- Aakash Pandey as Pandit
- Gulista Alija as Savita
- Rozy Dubey as Susma
- Manju Gupta as Dadi
- Aarav Mishra as Kunal
- Shashi Rajan as Rakess
- Ankita Rajpoot as Bhabhi
- Shashi Ranjan as Rakesh

== Reception ==
The film received mixed reviews. Pallabi Dey Purkayastha of The Times of India rated it 1.5 out of 5 stars, noting that "Yahan Sabhi Gyani Hai could have been a socially relevant satire as it had a good star cast to lean on, but the unplanned scripting has brought about its own downfall." Pooja Tiwari of Glamsham criticized the film for its disjointed narrative and lack of humor, stating "It could have been a solid social comment but here Anant Tripathi oversees the potential."

Film Information mentioned "Anant Narain Tripathi’s direction is terribly weak. Sadhu Tiwari’s music is ordinary. Rohit Sharma’s lyrics are commonplace. Background music (by Sadhu Tiwari and Nishant Salil) is dull. Shirish Desai’s camerawork is ordinary. Bhaskar Gupta’s sets are commonplace. Editing (Rajesh Pandey) leaves a lot to be desired."
