= Chot- Aj Isko, Kal Tereko =

Chot- Aaj Isko, Kal Tereko
- Directed by: Nabh Kumar Raju
- Written by: Atul Tiwari
- Produced by: Sanjay Thakur
- Starring: Ashutosh Rana; Sharad Kapoor; Rohit Nayyar; Jesse Randhawa; Nethra Raghuraman
- Music by: Raju Singh
- Release date: 18 June 2004
- Running time: 138 minutes
- Country: India
- Language: Hindi

Chot - Aaj Isko, Kal Tereko (transl. Injury - Him Today, You Tomorrow) is a 2004 Indian Hindi-language crime thriller film directed by Nabh Kumar Raju and produced by Sanjay Thakur. This movie was released on 18 June 2004 under the banner of S.M. International. This was the debut film of Indian model turned actress Jesse Randhawa.

== Plot ==
18 years ago Kishan Yadav came from a remote village in Uttar Pradesh to Mumbai. He worked hard day by day and set up a big dairy farm in the city. The workers also love him. Kishan lives with his younger brother Kabir. One day they are threatened by a builder and his goons to vacate the land for a new building. A corrupt and ruthless police officer A. S. Lal hired by the builder comes to the dairy farm and tells Kishan to give up the farm. Kishan goes to the local police and politicians but all in vain. When Kishan refuses to vacate the area, the builder and his goons make their life miserable. Kabir fights back along with a few milkmen. A few days later, Kabir is abducted by Lal who tortures him resulting in his death. Another police inspector Malati Desai tries to give them justice, but Kishan becomes frustrated. Now apparently cool and calm Kishan vows with anger and starts to take revenge against Lal and his associates.

== Cast ==
- Ashutosh Rana as Kishan Yadav
- Sharad Kapoor as Inspector A. S. Lal
- Rohit Nayyar as Kabir Yadav
- Jesse Randhawa as Anu
- Nethra Raghuraman as Inspector Malti Desai
- Vineet Kumar as Humdard
- Hemant Mahaur
- Ashok Banthia
- Anup Tanwar
- Ganesh Yadav as Prakash “Pakya” Sawant

== Soundtrack ==
The music of the film was composed by Raju Singh.
