= Shool =

1999 Indian Hindi-language action crime film by Eeshwar Nivas

- Poster
- Directed by: Eeshwar Nivas
- Written by: Screenplay: Ram Gopal Varma; Dialogues: Anurag Kashyap
- Story by: Ram Gopal Varma; Eeshwar Nivas
- Produced by: Ram Gopal Varma; Nitin Manmohan
- Starring: Manoj Bajpayee; Sayaji Shinde; Raveena Tandon
- Cinematography: Hari Nair
- Edited by: Bhanodaya
- Music by: Score: Sandeep Chowta; Soundtrack: Shankar–Ehsaan–Loy
- Production company: Varma Corporation
- Distributed by: Dream Merchants Enterprise
- Release date: 5 November 1999
- Running time: 135 minutes
- Country: India
- Language: Hindi
- Budget: ₹5 crore
- Box office: ₹8.58 crore

Shool (transl. Spike) is a 1999 Indian Hindi-language action drama film directed by Eeshwar Nivas. Written and produced by Ram Gopal Varma, it portrays the politician-criminal nexus and the criminalization of politics in Bihar and its effect on the life of an honest police officer. It stars Manoj Bajpayee as Inspector Samar Pratap Singh and Sayaji Shinde as the criminal-politician Bachhu Yadav.

The film won National Film Award for Best Feature Film in Hindi. Shool was featured at the International Film Festival of India, and the Toronto International Film Festival. It went on to gather a cult following over the years.

== Plot ==
The film opens with a late-night telephone call from Patna asking to speak to Bachchu Yadav, an MLA of the ruling political party in Bihar. His lackeys trace their boss to a prostitute's abode, where he receives the telephone and is informed that his party has selected another MLA for the ticket this time. He wastes no time, reaches the newly selected MLA candidate's home, and pressures him to give up his nomination in lieu of money. When intimidation fails, his thugs stab the MLA-candidate under his supervision.

Meanwhile, Inspector Samar Pratap Singh arrives in Motihari, Bihar, where he has been transferred to, with his wife Manjari and daughter. At the railway station, he gets into a confrontation with a coolie. The two have a tiff on the payment of Rs. 30/- to be paid to the coolie for his services, which Singh refuses to pay, as he (rightfully) thinks he is being overcharged. As the situation goes to the verge of fisticuffs, a local police hawaldaar intervenes. Not knowing that Singh, too, is a police officer, the hawaldaar tries to manhandle Singh. Infuriated, Singh takes the matter to the police station to which he is posted. As Singh writes a complaint against the hawaldaar for harassing an innocent local (Singh), a sub-inspector, Hussain, intervenes. Hussain asks Singh to forgive the hawaldaar, to which Singh does not relent. Singh later learns that the Motihari police station runs according to Yadav's whims. Singh is an idealist who respects the constitution and the rule of law, and expects that everyone else should do the same. But no one follows the law in Motihari, especially the policemen who receive hafta (illicit weekly payments) from Yadav to do his bidding.

One day, the D.S.P. asks Singh to break up a fight between two rival gangs and arrest the people who attacked some of Yadav's men. Singh investigates and finds out that Yadav's men are the real culprits. Among them are Sudhir Vinod and Lallan Singh, so Singh arrests them instead. When the D.S.P. orders Singh to release them, he refuses, saying that he has already registered the case. This is the first time Singh's superior learns of his real character and expresses concern over his future. Sub-inspector Hussain, who shamelessly admits to subjection to Yadav, declares that Singh won't last long in his current job if he continues in his ways. Singh sadly learns the limit of his official prowess when the court releases Yadav's men.

Yadav gets irritated by Singh's methods, particularly because he arrested his men. He decides to annoy him and organises his own marriage anniversary. Singh reaches the scene and asks to see the required permission papers for operating loudspeakers late into the night. When no such official papers are produced, Singh seizes the music system and disrupts the party. Yadav confronts him and asks to be forgiven (in a patronising and satiric manner). The inebriated D.S.P., who is also present at the party, tries to cool Singh's temper by telling him that such rules are inconsequential in small villages. Singh refuses to yield, which angers the D.S.P., who gives Singh a direct order to let the matter go. Singh stands firm and states that he will let the situation go only if given written orders. The following morning, the act of defiance by Singh causes a heated debate between Singh and the D.S.P., who, with the help of the corrupt sub-inspector Hussain, frames Singh for a physical attack on his senior. Tiwari tries to help Singh, but in vain, and Singh is suspended from his post.

Yadav and his men decide to land the final blow on Singh and finish him once and for all, with his goons passing disgustingly indecent comments towards Singh's daughter at a market, causing Singh to lose his temper and single-handedly beat them. One of the henchmen attacks Singh with a heavy wooden club, but instead bludgeons Singh's daughter on her head, killing her.

When the badly injured Laljee goes to Yadav and tells him that Singh has beaten them badly, Yadav, who cares next to nothing even about his most loyal men, finds it a golden opportunity to accuse Singh. He immediately takes a shotgun from the wall and hits Laljee on the head forcefully enough to kill him, and then orders his henchmen to register a complaint that Laljee actually died because of the beating by Singh. The police waste no time and arrest Singh while he is still grieving over his daughter's dead body. Singh's parents come to help him, and his father pleads with Yadav to get him released. Yadav uses this situation to his advantage and gets Singh released by asking one of his henchmen to testify. When Singh realises that Yadav was behind his release, he insults Yadav.

A few days later, Singh's parents leave, and he has a big fight with his wife, who holds his idealism to blame for the quagmire they find themselves in, including their daughter's death. She asks him why he won't kill Yadav if he's as brave as he pretends to be. Singh tells her he's afraid for her sake and leaves in a huff. Manjari tries to commit suicide with an overdose of sleeping pills. Singh's only true friend in town, the honest sub-inspector Tiwari, informs Singh about Manjari's suicide attempt, and both rush to the hospital. Singh manages to speak a few sentences of comfort with her, where she absolves him of his guilt and asks him to avenge her and their daughter, before she dies.

Singh, having lost the woman he loved, feels he has lost everything and has nothing to live for anymore. He goes home, readies himself and wears his police uniform, visits the police station, and snatches his service weapon in spite of sub-inspector Hussain's warning. Hussain pulls out his gun, but Singh kills him and makes his way to Patna, where the state legislature is in session. He enters the well of the house, defying heavy security. Singh finds Yadav and drags him by his collar to the Speaker's dais. After an emotional appeal to members of parliament on the leadership crisis and criminalisation of politics, he shoots Yadav in the head, declares his patriotism, and yells "Jai Hind" twice.

== Cast ==
- Manoj Bajpayee as Inspector Samar Pratap Singh
- Raveena Tandon as Manjari Pratap Singh, Samar's wife
- Sayaji Shinde as Bacchu "Bhaiyaji" Yadav
- Vineet Kumar as Inspector Tiwari
- Ganesh Yadav as Inspector Hussain
- Virendra Saxena as Prabal Pratap Singh, Samar's father
- Nandu Madhav as Laljee Yadav
- Sandeep Kulkarni as Gopaljee
- Nagesh Bhosle as Sudhir Vinod
- Yashpal Sharma as Lallan Singh
- Shri Vallabh Vyas as DSP
- Rajpal Yadav as Coolie
- Pratima Kazmi as Bacchu Yadav's mother
- Nawazuddin Siddiqui as Waiter
- Shilpa Shetty as the dancer in the item number "Main Aayi Hoon U. P. Bihar Lootne"

== Production ==
Shool was shot in Motihari, Bettiah, Bhopal, and Hyderabad. The climax of the film was shot at the state legislative assembly premises of Hyderabad, and Bhopal. The casting of the film is done by Varma and Kashyap.

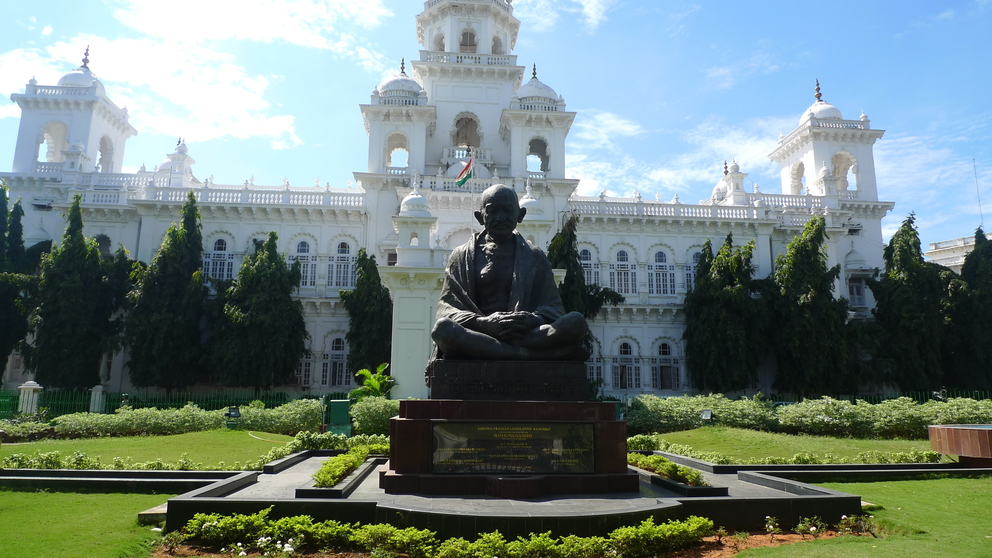
State Legislative Assembly in Hyderabad where in parts of the climax were shot

== Soundtrack ==
Shool

Soundtrack album by Shankar–Ehsaan–Loy
- Released: 11 September 1999 (India)
- Genre: Feature film soundtrack
- Label: T-Series
- Producer: Ram Gopal Varma

Shankar–Ehsaan–Loy chronology
Bhopal Express (1999)	Shool (1999)	Mission Kashmir (2000)

Track #	Song	Singer(s)
1	Aaya Mere Papa Ko	Kavita Krishnamurthy, Shankar Mahadevan, Baby Anagha
2	Main Aayi Hoon U.P. Bihar Lootne	Sapna Awasthi, Chetan Shashitaal, Shankar Mahadevan
3	Main Aayi Hoon U.P. Bihar Lootne (Remix)	Sapna Awasthi, Chetan Shashitaal
4	Shool	Shankar Mahadevan
5	Shool Si Chubhe Hai	Sukhwinder Singh

== Reception ==
Anupama Chopra of India Today wrote, "Shool is pacy, has a dollop of music and crisp dialogues written by Anurag Kashyap. But it isn't the pathbreaker that Zanjeer and Ardh Satya were. Because it is utterly predictable. The story about an honest policeman has been worn out by Hindi cinema. Shool doesn't take the premise further." Anil Nair of Rediff.com wrote, "In the end one can only say that Shool is for the most part a slovenly film and its politics fuzzy, but there is a vitality to the fuzziness. Not something every Hindi movie can claim." Bella Jaisinghani of The Indian Express criticised the violence in the film by writing, "The heavy overdose of violence would only appeal to those struck by the Satya Syndrome. The rest of the audience would want to shut its senses to the assault being inflicted on it."

In a retrospective review in 2018, Anvita Singh of The Indian Express wrote, "Eeshwar Nivas’ direction is decent, and the script, okay, but it could have gone down the hill had Manoj Bajpayee not been there. Sayaji Shinde as Bacchu Yadav also puts up a solid act as the crooked and scheming politician, but it's Manoj's performance as the fair police officer that escalates the movie."

== Awards ==
List of awards and nominations
Award	Ceremony	Category	Recipient(s)	Result	Ref(s)
National Film Awards	47th National Film Awards	Best Feature Film in Hindi	Ram Gopal Varma, Nitin Manmohan and E. Nivas	Won	
Filmfare Awards	45th Filmfare Awards	Critics Award for Best Actor	Manoj Bajpai	Won	
Screen Awards	6th Screen Awards	Most Promising Debut Director	E. Nivas	Nominated	
Screen Awards	6th Screen Awards	Best Actor	Manoj Bajpai	Nominated	
Screen Awards	6th Screen Awards	Best Actor in a Negative Role	Sayaji Shinde	Won	
