= Rajkumar Keswani =

Indian journalist (1950–2021)

- Born: 26 November 1950; Bhopal, Madhya Pradesh, India
- Died: 21 May 2021 (aged 70)
- Occupation: Journalist

Rajkumar Keswani (26 November 1950 – 21 May 2021) was an Indian journalist and writer, known for his role in warning about the 1984 Bhopal Gas Tragedy months before the disaster took place. After working as a sub-editor in his college days, Keswani went on to be associated with major outlets including NDTV and India Today. He was also the author of Daastan-e-Mughal-e-Azam, based on the film Mughal-e-Azam, celebrating its 60th anniversary.

== Biography ==
Keswani was the first journalist to bring attention to the safety lapses and impending Bhopal disaster that eventually came to pass at the town's Union Carbide pesticides plant overnight on 2–3 December 1984. Keswani had written several articles, from 1982 through 1984, detailing that safety standards at the plant were inadequate and that a catastrophic leak could result.

Keswani began to take an interest in the affairs of the Union Carbide Bhopal India plant in 1981 when his friend Mohammad Ashraf, a plant employee, spoke of possible dangers posed by leaks. He died in an accident at the plant on 24 December 1981 after inhaling phosgene. For internal information sources Keswani found two people who were fired — Bashirullah and Shankar Malviya who helped him to get hold of all manuals and confidential reports. It took Keswani nine months to write his first piece in 1982.

== Raising alarm before the disaster in Bhopal ==
Reports of safety lapses in the plant had started surfacing in 1981 — three years before the disaster — when a minor gas leak killed an employee inside the plant. Keswani first wrote about inadequate safety standards on 26 September 1982 with a title "Bachaiye huzoor is shahar ko bachaiye" ("Save Please, Save This City") in the small weekly paper Rapat. He repeated the warning in two follow-up articles on 1 October "Jwalamukhi ke muhane baitha Bhopal" ("Bhopal sitting on the brink of a volcano") and on 8 October "Na samjhoge to aakhir mit hi jaoge" ("If you don’t understand, you all shall be wiped out") that year. On 5 October, four days after the second article, 18 people at the Union Carbide plant were exposed to a mixture of chloroform, methyl isocyanate and hydrochloric acid from a leaking valve. None were seriously harmed.

In the article "Bhopal: On the Brink of a Disaster," Keswani reported on a series of incidents and asserted that the leak on 5 October 1982 had affected thousands of residents of neighboring slum districts who fled in fear and returned only after eight hours. He also asserted in the article that in 1975, M.N. Buch, an Indian bureaucrat, had asked Union Carbide to move the plant away from its present site because of the rapid growth of residential neighborhoods around it. Union Carbide were lucky because Buch was transferred from his post.

Keswani reported a Telex exchange Union Carbide India manager J. Mukund (one of the accused who was convicted on 7 June) sent asking for advice about coating the pipes. The U.S.-based parent company sent him a message saying that the best material for piping would be too expensive and too difficult to acquire. They highlighted how Union Carbide escaped their responsibility when they were advising Bhopal to economise on safety measures and instructed Bhopal to use cheaper material. They were advising it to compromise on safety. Mukund's message was sent on 27 August 1984 — a few months before the fateful leak.

Being a journalist, Keswani initially knew nothing about the chemistry and composition of the chemicals or their behaviour. His conviction that the Union Carbide Bhopal plant was headed for disaster grew out of two small pieces of information that he happened to read independently. One was in a Union Carbide report that mentioned in passing that several of the gases that methyl isocyanate (MIC) broke down into, such as phosgene, were "heavier than air." Reference to phosgene caught his attention while reading an article on WWII; it had been one of the chemicals used in the German gas chambers. With these two incidental pieces of information, Keswani launched an investigation that convinced him that Bhopal was on the road to tragedy. In spite of the shrillness of his warnings, no one paid him attention. Even his friends thought he was crazy.

== Life after the disaster ==
After the disaster, Keswani was interviewed on radio and television shows, as he was the only journalist who knew anything about the Union Carbide Bhopal plant. He was called a "Cassandra" and a "lone voice in the wilderness." Keswani became the youngest person ever to receive the Indian B.D. Goenka Award for Excellence in Journalism in 1985. In his acceptance speech Keswani noted that he might be the first to receive the award for such a spectacular journalistic failure "had he succeed at his task no one would have ever taken note." Keswani received the "Madhav Rao Sapre Puraskar" award in 2008. He received the Prem Bhatia Award 2010 for Outstanding Environmental Reporting.

== Death ==
Keswani died from complications from COVID-19 on 21st May 2021.

== In popular culture ==
Bhopal: A Prayer for Rain, a film based on the gas tragedy, features journalist Motwani's character, played by Kal Penn, who is loosely inspired by Keswani. The character of Jagmohan Kumawat, played by Sunny Hinduja in the 2023 Netflix series The Railway Men, is also inspired by Keswani.
