= Eeshwar Niwas =

Indian film director

Eshwar Niwas
- Other name: E. Niwas
- Occupations: Director; Screenwriter
- Spouse: Priyanka
- Children: 2

Eshwar Niwas is an Indian film director known for his works in Hindi cinema. In 1999, he won the National Film Award for directing Shool.

== Early life and career ==
He was born in Hyderabad. He ventured into Telugu film industry as an assistant director under the mentorship of Ram Gopal Varma. He subsequently entered Hindi cinema.

== Filmography ==
As director

- Shool (1999)
- Love Ke Liye Kuch Bhi Karega (2001)
- Dum (2003)
- Bardaasht (2004)
- My Name Is Anthony Gonsalves (2008)
- De Taali (2008)
- Total Siyapaa (2014)
- Your Honor (2020) (TV series)
- Tanaav (2024) (TV series; season 2)

As writer

- Shool (1999) (story)
- Dum (2003) (screenplay)

As producer

- My Name Is Anthony Gonsalves (2008)

== Awards ==
National Film Awards

- National Film Award for Best Feature Film in Hindi (director) – Shool – 1999
