= Patna Collegiate School =

- Dariyapur, Patna; Patna, Bihar, 800004; India

Information
- Type: Government
- Motto: "योग उद्योग सहयोग" ("Yoga Industry Collaboration")
- Established: c. 1835
- Founder: Officials of East India Company
- School board: Bihar School Examination Board
- Principal: Dr. Subhash Chandra Singh
- Classes offered: 9-12 (Intermediate)
- Language: English/Hindi
- Schedule type: Morning
- Affiliations: BSEB

Patna Collegiate School is a Government High School located in Patna, Bihar, India. It was established by officials of East India Company on 10 August 1835 to spread the english pattern of education in Bihar. Its previous name was Patna High School. It was founded at Alan Ganj, Ashok Rajpath, Patna and is the oldest High School in the State of Bihar, India. The school is located at Dariyapur, Patna and is affiliated with the Bihar School Examination Board. The current principal of the school is Dr. Madhuri Dwivedi.

== History ==
Patna Collegiate School, Patna was founded on 10 August 1835 by the officials of East India Company. In 1862 the name of the school was changed to its present name of Patna Collegiate School and was transferred to the place which is now referred as Patna Campus. Mr. J. E. Mecridle was appointed its head and was designated as its Principal.

In 1915 IA Course of Patna College, Patna was transferred to Patna Collegiate and it was renamed New College (Junior Patna College). Till June 1927, It functioned as New College.

On 1 July 1927, the school unit of New College was transferred to its present building and since then the institution is functioning in the name of Patna Collegiate School, Dariyapur, Patna.

The school offered higher secondary education from class 9 to 12 (Intermediate), after class 10 (matriculation) students have to choose a stream for their intermediate education, Science,Commerce and Arts are the streams currently available in this school.

== Location ==
The school is located in Dariyapur locality of Patna. It is at a distance of 1 kilometer from places like Gandhi Maidan, Patna University, PMCH, Patna Collectorate and Moin-ul-Haq Stadium.

== School under Government of Bihar ==
As per provisions of National Education Policy (10+2+3), the Govt. of Bihar in July 1984 started +2 teaching from the academic session 1984 - 86 in the institution. The teaching was initiated in the Science Commerce & Arts Stream. Government of Bihar is planning to launch Virtual Classroom for the school.

== Notable alumni ==
- Bidhan Chandra Roy - Second Chief Minister of West Bengal
- Jayaprakash Narayan - Indian independence activist, social reformer and political leader
- Shatrughan Sinha - Actor and Member of Parliament
- Ravi Shankar Prasad
- Justice Aftab Alam (judge) - Retired Indian Supreme Court Judge
- Sudhir Kumar Kataria - Retired Patna High Court Judge
- Sunit Kumar - IPS Officer
- Vineet Kumar - Actor
- Yashwant Sinha -Former Finance Minister of India
