= Vineet Kumar =

Indian actor

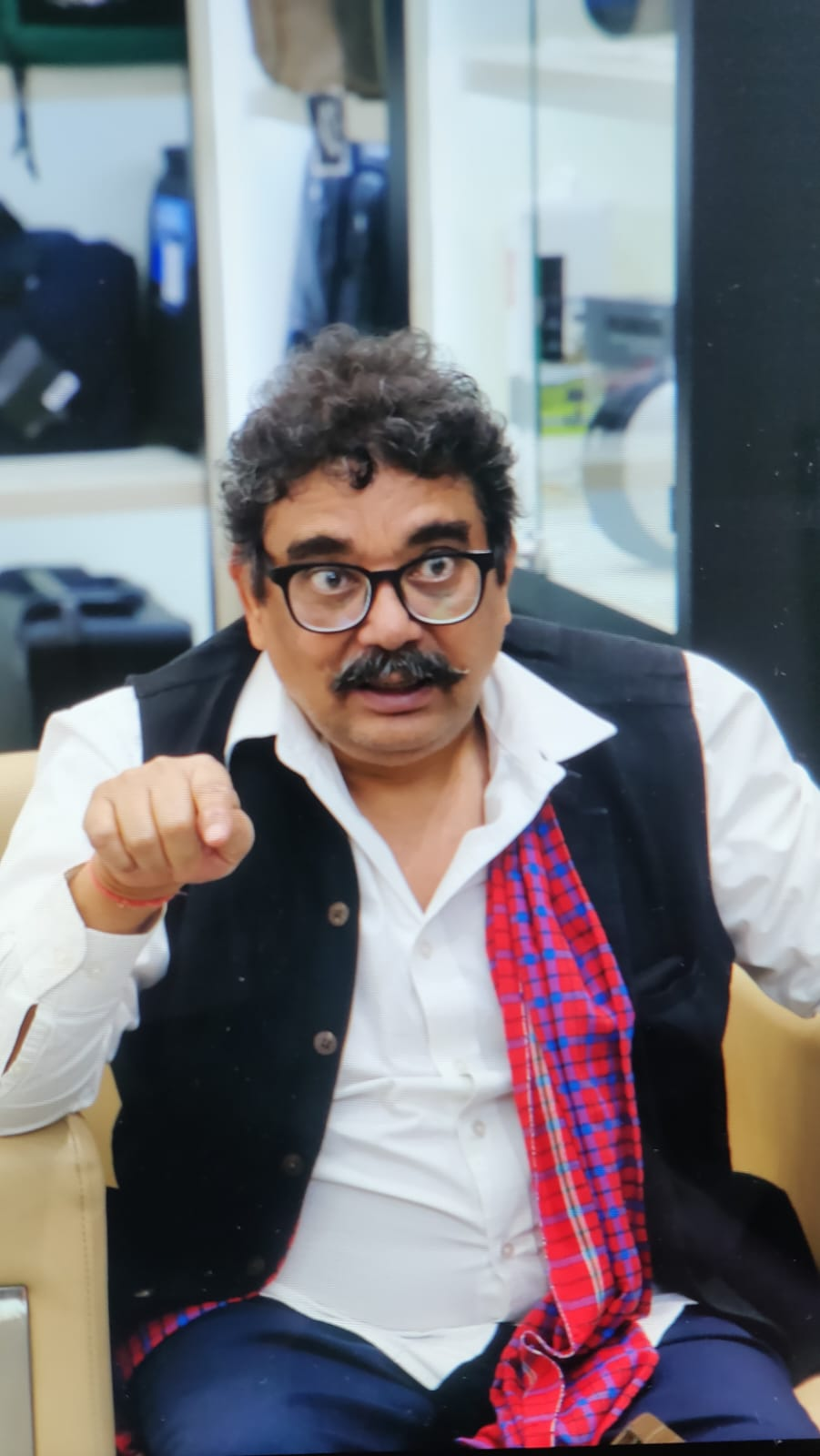
- Born: Patna, Bihar, India
- Education: Bihar National College; Patna University; National School of Drama
- Occupation: Actor
- Years active: 1974/75–present
- Notable work: Drohkaal; Vikramarkudu; Masaan
- Spouse: Manoranjan Dhaliwal (m. 1995)
- Relatives: Sunit Kumar (brother)
- Awards: Indian Television Academy Awards, 2016

Vineet Kumar is an Indian actor from the National School of Drama, known for his works in Hindi, Telugu, and English language films and television. His Hollywood assignments include Return to Rajapur with Lynn Collins; Bhopal: A Prayer for Rain with Martin Sheen and Mischa Barton. He has also appeared in a number of Telugu, Kannada, and Bhojpuri films. He received critical acclaim for his work in the Telugu film Vikramarkudu.

== Personal life ==
He is younger brother of Bihar Cadre IPS officer Sunit Kumar.

== Career ==
He has appeared in a number of Hindi films. These include Drohkaal, Kachche Dhaage, Aks, Yeh Dil, Soch and Shool. Apart from Bollywood movies, he has also worked on Hollywood assignments such as Return to Rajapur with Lynn Collins; Bhopal: A Prayer for Rain with Martin Sheen and Mischa Barton. He has also appeared in a number of Telugu, Tamil and Bhojpuri movies. He received critical acclaim for his work in the Telugu movie Vikramarkudu.

He received positive reviews for his work in Masaan and has been termed 'Brilliant' for his role as a professional cremator. Masaan was screened in the Un Certain Regard section at the 2015 Cannes Film Festival winning two awards.

== Awards, honours and recognition ==
Kumar won the Best Actor in Negative Role (Jury) award for Jaana Na Dil Se Door at the 16th Indian Television Academy Awards (ITA) in 2016.

== Filmography ==
=== Hindi films ===
List of Vineet Kumar Hindi film credits
Year	Film	Role	Other notes
1994	Drohkaal		
1996	Sanshodhan		
1997	Daud		
1998	Hazaar Chaurasi Ki Maa	Madan Mukherji	
1999	Kachche Dhaage	Bhagta	
1999	Godmother	Lakhubhai	
1999	Shool	Inspector Tiwari	
1999	Thakshak		
2001	Aks	Narang	
2002	Soch	Bharose	
2002	Makdee	Vineet Kumar	
2003	Yeh Dil	Mithuwa Yadav	
2003	Ek Din 24 Ghante	Mr. Patel	
2004	Shobhayatra	Subhash Chandra Bose	
2004	Chot	Dr Vineet Kumar	
2005	Pehchaan: The Face of Truth	Ajay Lal	
2006	Strings - Bound by faith	Pujari	
2006	Dil Se Pooch Kidhar Jaana Hai		
2007	Dhokha		
2012	Ata Pata Laapata	Hawaldar	
2013	Club 60	Sinha	
2014	Manjunath	SP Zaki Ahmad	
2015	Masaan	Dom Raja	
2016	Subah Ke Pehle		Short Film
2017	Yahan Sabhi Gyani Hain		
2017	Laal Jalti Hai Chita		Short Film - Voice
2021	14 Phere		
2021	Roam Rome Mein		
2021	Ramprasad Ki Tehrvi		
2023	Bholaa	Nithari	
2025	Bhool Chuk Maaf	Panditji	
2025	The Sadist	Common People	

=== Telugu films ===
Year	Film	Role	Other notes
2006	Vikramarkudu	Bavuji	
2010	Rama Rama Krishna Krishna	Pawar	
2011	Kandireega		
2013	Naayak	Dassu	
2014	Aagadu	Nagaraju	
2014	Brother of Bommali		
2015	Shivam	Bhoji Reddy	
2016	Sardaar Gabbar Singh		
2016	Supreme	Patnaik	
2018	Inttelligent	Home Minister	
2018	Touch Chesi Chudu	Keshava Prasad	
2019	Operation 2019	Minister	
2019	Chanakya	Mohammad Ali Khan	
2020	Bombhaat	Dada	
2023	S.K.N: Survaana Kshetram Namahaa	Agent Prasad	
2025	Laila	Khaidi	

=== Tamil films ===
Year	Film	Role	Other notes
2011	Velayudham	Ulaganathan	Tamil

=== Nagpuri films ===
Year	Film	Role	Other notes
2019	Phulmania	TBA	Nagpuri

=== English films ===
Year	Film	Role	Other notes
1992	Electric Moon		
2006	Return to Rajapur	Lal	
2006	Strings		
2014	Bhopal: A Prayer for Rain	Choudhury	
2015	Fly Away Solo		Cannes Release - 19 May 2015

== Television ==
Year	TV series	Role	Other notes
2023	Garmi	Bairagi Baba	Web Series
2022	Maharani 2	Gauri Shankar Pandey	Web Series
2022	The Great Indian Murder	Ambika Prasad	Web Series
2022	Nirmal Pathak Ki Ghar Wapsi	Neta Ji	Web Weries
2021	Maharani	Gauri Shankar Pandey	Web Series
2016 - 2017	Jaana Na Dil Se Door	Kailash Kashyap	Star Plus - 9 May 2016
2014 - 2015	Maha Kumbh (TV series)	Khoye Paye Pandey	Life Ok
2013 - 2014	Lapataganj (Ek Bar Phir)	Kachhua Chacha	Sab TV
2012	Chidiya Ghar	Sudama	Sab TV – Episodes: 216–222
2010	Hum - Ek Chote Gaon Ki Badi Kahani		DD National
2010	Lapataganj: Sharad Joshi Ki Kahaniyon Ka Pata	Kachua Chacha	Sab TV
2005 - 2009	Saat Phere: Saloni Ka Safar		Zee TV
2003	Yeh Public Hai Sab Jaanti Hai		Sab TV
2003	Kashmeer		Star Plus
2003	Kabhie Kabhie		Zee TV
2002-2004	Dhadkan		Sony TV
2002	Kagaar		
2002	Ramkhelawan C.M. & Family	Ramkhelawan C.M.	Sab TV
2000	Itihaas		DD National
1996	Aahat	Shankar (ep 31–32), Zorba (ep 42–43)	Sony TV
1995-1997	Swabhimaan		DD National
1994	Shikast		
1994	Kurukshetra		Zee TV
–	Aatish		
–	Reporter		
–	Hum Bhi Hain Tumhare		
–	Sea Hawks		
–	Ab Ayega Mazaa		
–	Ek Din Ki Wardi		
–	Kshitij		
–	Kadam		
–	Yugantar		

== Awards and nominations ==
Year	Award	Category	Work	Result	Notes
2003	Indian Telly Awards	Best Actor in a Comic Role (Male)	Ramkhilawan CM & Family	Nominated	
2016	Indian Television Academy Awards	Best Actor in a Negative Role	Jaana Na Dil Se Door	Won	
