= Thakshak =

1999 Indian film by Govind Nihalani

- Directed by: Govind Nihalani
- Written by: Govind Nihalani; Kamlesh Pandey
- Produced by: Manmohan Shetty (presenter); Govinda Nihalani
- Starring: Ajay Devgn; Tabu; Rahul Bose; Nethra Raghuraman; Govind Namdeo; Amrish Puri
- Cinematography: Govind Nihalani
- Edited by: Deepa Bhatia
- Music by: A. R. Rahman
- Distributed by: Udbhav
- Release date: 3 December 1999
- Running time: 161 minutes
- Country: India
- Language: Hindi
- Budget: ₹6.5 crore
- Box office: ₹10 crore

Thakshak is a 1999 Indian action-drama film written, produced, filmed and directed by Govind Nihalani. Touted as Nihalani's attempt at popular cinema, this film stars Ajay Devgn, Tabu and Rahul Bose. The soundtrack was composed by A. R. Rahman.

== Plot ==
A poetic romance between Ishaan and Suman set against the concrete Mumbai cityscape opens the film.

Ishaan, the only son of an affluent business family, and his contemporary peer Sunny, the grandson of the head of the business house, are being groomed to take over the business. They share a strong male bonding, Ishaan's controlled and silent strength acts as an anchor to Sunny's flamboyance and recklessly violent streak. The business, a construction empire built by Ishaan's father Nahar Singh and Sunny's grandfather, is rooted in violent and unlawful activities.

Ishaan, sheltered in comfort and security, begins to question his environment as his relationship with Suman, an idealistic young woman, opens a new world to him. As his love for her grows, so does his fear of losing her. Ishaan is caught between a life steeped in violence and his love for Suman who abhors violence.

Torn by his desire to leave the world of crime, and his sense of loyalty to his father and his friend, Ishaan unwillingly gets drawn deeper into violence, and finds himself a participant in an act of gruesome cold-blooded massacre. The image of a young girl disabled by this violent act haunts his conscience. His quiet, but firm resolve, to withdraw from the business clashes with Nahar Singh's pragmatism (to build power at any cost and to legalise crime with that power), and with Sunny's refusal to release him from his oath of loyalty.

The events escalate with Ishaan's arrest, and Nahar Singh's murder. Ishaan is finally forced to make a choice between personal loyalty and a larger allegiance to society and truth.

== Cast ==
- Ajay Devgan as Ishaan Kumar Singh
- Tabu as Suman Dev
- Amrish Puri as Nahar Singh
- Govind Namdeo as Aslam Khan
- Nethra Raghuraman as Nishi
- Rahul Bose as Sunny Bihani
- A. K. Hangal as Homeless Teacher
- Uttara Baokar as Ishaan's Mother
- Rajesh Tailang
- Vineet Kumar
- Anupam Shyam
- Eijaz Khan
- Ravi Patwardhan as Jodha Bhai

== Soundtrack ==
Thakshak

Soundtrack album by A. R. Rahman
- Released: 1999 (India)
- Recorded: 1998–99
- Studio: Panchathan record inn.
- Genre: Film soundtrack
- Label: Saregama
- Producer: Manmohan Shetty

A. R. Rahman chronology
Mudhalvan (1999)	Thakshak (1999)	Pukar (1999)

The music was composed by A. R. Rahman and lyrics penned by Mehboob and Sukhwinder Singh.

Song	Artist(s)	Lyrics
"Rang De"	Asha Bhonsle, A. R. Rahman	Sukhwinder Singh
"Khamosh Raat"	Roop Kumar Rathod	Sukhwinder Singh
"Jaan Meri"	Hema Sardesai	Mehboob
"Dheem Ta Dare"	Surjo Bhattacharya	Mehboob
"Boondon Se Baatein"	Sujata Trivedi	Mehboob
"Toofan Ki Raat"	Hema Sardesai	Mehboob
"Dholna"	Sukhwinder Singh	Sukhwinder Singh
"Jumbalika"	Alisha Chinai, Shankar Mahadevan	Mehboob

== Reception ==
Sharmila Taliculam of Rediff.com said, "This is Nihalani's first attempt at making a popular film. And he goes overboard." Anupama Chopra writing for India Today stated, "The performances are first-rate, especially those of Devgan and Amrish Puri. Only Bose, at times, goes over the top. Nihalani meanders unsteadily through the first half, but finds his grip during the second, expertly building up the tension to his minimalist climax. Thakshak is an experiment in popular format. It doesn't work fully, but patient viewers can expect to be amply rewarded."
