= Nethra Raghuraman =

Indian actress and model

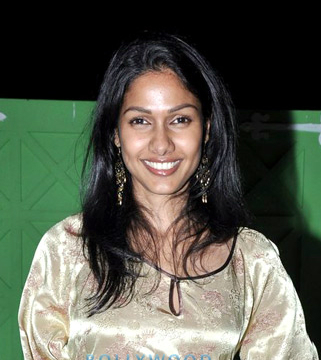
- Nethra Raghuraman graces the launch of Olive's new menu
- Born: Vadodara, Gujarat, India
- Occupations: Actress; Model
- Years active: 1997–2016
- Spouse: Kunal Guha (m. 2011)

Nethra Raghuraman is an Indian actress and model . She has been selected as Look Of The Year contest winner for Femina magazine in 1997. She also won the Best Female Newcomer title at Star Screen Awards in 2000. Her most notable films include Thakshak by Govind Nihalani and Bhopal Express, a David Lynch presentation. Raghuraman has appeared in various music videos and won the TV reality show Fear Factor: Khatron Ke Khiladi 1 in 2008.

== Personal life ==
She was born into a Tamil Hindu family Nethra married Singapore-based businessman, Kunal Guha, son of Indian cricketer Subrata Guha, in late 2011.

== Filmography ==
Year	Film	Role
1999	Thakshak	Nishi
1999	Bhopal Express	Tara
2001	Avgat	Sudha
2001	Majunu	Special appearance in the song "Mercury Mele"
2004	Inteqam - The Perfect Game	Dr. Mehak
2004	Chot- Aj Isko, Kal Tereko	Inspector Malti Desai
2005	Tum... Ho Na!	Anjali J. Walia
2006	Husn - Love and Betrayal	Trisha
2016	Bhagya Na Jaane Koi	Budhiya

=== Television ===
- 2008 - Fear Factor: Khatron Ke Khiladi 1 as Winner
- 1999 - Captain Vyom as Dr. Naina / Parchhaayee (Daughter of Kaala Saaya -Emperor of Parajeevs).
