= Bhopal Express (film) =

- DVD cover of Bhopal Express
- Directed by: Mahesh Mathai
- Written by: Prasoon Pandey; Piyush Pandey
- Produced by: Deepak Nayar; Tabrez Noorani
- Starring: Naseeruddin Shah; Kay Kay Menon; Nethra Raghuraman
- Cinematography: Mahesh Mathai
- Edited by: Priya Krishnaswamy
- Music by: Songs: Shankar–Ehsaan–Loy; Lucky Ali; Jagjit Singh; Background Score: Shankar–Ehsaan–Loy
- Release date: 2 December 1999
- Running time: 100 mins
- Country: India
- Language: Hindi

Bhopal Express is a 1999 Indian Hindi film directed by Mahesh Mathai. The film stars Kay Kay Menon, Naseeruddin Shah, Nethra Raghuraman, Zeenat Aman and Vijay Raaz in his film debut. The story was written by Prasoon Pandey and Piyush Pandey. The music was composed by the Shankar–Ehsaan–Loy trio.

== Plot ==
Set against the gas tragedy in Bhopal, India, in 1984, this human drama examines the irresponsible methods of large corporations and the effects of their actions on common people. The night of the tragedy, poison gas clouds from the Union Carbide factory enveloped an arc of over 20 square kilometres killing over 15,000 people in its immediate aftermath and causing multi-systemic injuries to over 500,000 residents. Lest the neighbourhood community be "unduly alarmed", the siren in the factory had been switched off, adding to what would become an enduring disaster of immeasurable proportions. Adding insult to injury, researchers find that the future generations of the survivors will continue to suffer through chromosomal damage caused by the leak. The story unravels through the eyes of a newlywed couple and their friends as they try to pick up the pieces in the aftermath of the catastrophe.

== Cast ==
- Kay Kay Menon as Verma
- Naseeruddin Shah as Bashir
- Nethra Raghuraman as Tara
- Zeenat Aman as Zohrabai
- Vijay Raaz as Badru
- Bert Thomas as David
- Dorinda Katz as American Girl
- Chris Sullivan as Maurice

== Soundtrack ==
Bhopal Express

Soundtrack album by Shankar–Ehsaan–Loy
- Released: November 1999 (India)
- Genre: Feature film soundtrack
- Label: Sony BMG
- Producer: Deepak Nayar; Tabrez Noorani

Shankar–Ehsaan–Loy chronology
Dilagi (1999)	Bhopal Express (1999)	Shool (1999)

Song	Artist(s)	Duration	Music director
"Udan Khatola"	Ila Arun	5:15	Shankar–Ehsaan–Loy
"Tu Kaun Hai"	Lucky Ali	4:05	Lucky Ali
"Hum Kaise Log Hai"	Sagarika	5:31	Shankar–Ehsaan–Loy
"Is Nagari Mein"	Jagjit Singh	3:12	Jagjit Singh
"December 2, 1984"	Amitabh Bachchan	2:52	Shankar–Ehsaan–Loy (Background Score)
"Aaj Jaane Ki Zidd Na Karo"	Ila Arun	5:33	Shankar–Ehsaan–Loy

== Accolades ==
List of awards and nominations
Award	Ceremony	Category	Recipient(s)	Result	Ref(s)
Screen Awards	6th Screen Awards	Best Supporting Actor	Naseeruddin Shah	Nominated	
Screen Awards	6th Screen Awards	Most Promising Newcomer – Female	Nethra Raghuraman	Won	
Screen Awards	6th Screen Awards	Most Promising Debut Director	Mahesh Mathai	Nominated	
