= Bihar Police Subordinate Services Commission =

Commission in Bihar

- Abbreviation: BPSSC
- Formation: 1 April 2016; 10 years ago
- Type: Civil Service Recruitment Agency: Group 'C' of Bihar Police & Other Departments
- Purpose: Civil Servant Recruitment: Group 'C' of Bihar Police & Other Departments
- Headquarters: Patna, Bihar
- Region served: Bihar
- Members: 1. Sri Suresh Prasad Chaudhary - Member; 2. Sri Pankaj Sinha - Member Secretary 3. Sri Praveen Kumar, Joint Secretary, Transport; Department, Bihar - Member
- Chairman: K. S. Dwivedi, IPS (Rtd.) Chairman
- Main organ: Bihar Police Sub-ordinate Services Commission
- Parent organization: Department of Home Government of Bihar
- Website: http://bpssc.bih.nic.in/

The Bihar Police Subordinate Services Commission (BPSSC) is a Group 'C' civil service recruitment body for Bihar Police created by an Act of the Bihar Legislative Assembly. The commission's purpose is to select applicants in various government departments for Group 'C' staff jobs in the Bihar Police Through Competitive Examination according to the merits of the applicants and the rules of reservations.

== History ==
Bihar Police Subordinate Services Commission (BPSSC) Bill was passed in Bihar State Assembly on 31 March 2016. The Government created the commission in order to handle the recruitment of subordinate staff of only those departments where the recruits covered are required to abide by certain physical fitness norms and also have to wear prescribed uniforms. These recruitment were previously being handled by Staff Selection Commission which was heavily burdened. Large scale vacancies in various government departments prompted the government to bring in BPSSC bill.

In March 2017 Home Department of Bihar Government issued order filling up the positions of Chairman, Member Secretary and Members of the commission. Sunit Kumar was appointed as the first Chairman of the commission.

== Composition ==
BPSSC is a Five-member body, including chairman. The Chairman should be DG or ADG rank officer from the police department (Retired or Serving officer). The commission also includes one Member Secretary and three Members. While manning BPSSC, mandatory representation has to be given to scheduled caste (SC) and scheduled tribe (ST) categories.

== Recruitment ==
Bihar Police Subordinate Services Commission is tasked with recruitment of Group C staff of Bihar Government where the recruits covered are required to abide by certain physical fitness norms and also have to wear prescribed uniforms. The departments concerned for recruitment by the commission are police, jail, forest and excise etc. Government posts with grade pay of Rs 4,200 are recruited through the commission. These posts include sub-inspector (SI) of Police, company commander (home guards), fire station officer, assistant jail superintendent, sub-inspector excise and sub-Inspector Rank officers of other departments like transport & vigilance.

BPSC Agriculture Department Document Verification Program 2024

The Bihar Public Service Commission (BPSC) has released document verification for the Bihar Agriculture Service. Eligible candidates can apply for the exam on the official website bpsc.bih.nic.in.

Candidates should upload the certificates/documents mentioned in their online application on the dashboard from September 7 to 9. The Commission has also released the list of eligible and non-eligible candidates. The result of the Bihar Agriculture Service Written (Objective) Competitive Examination was published on September 27. For more details, candidates can refer to the official notification.

== Current members ==
- K.S. Dwivedi (1984 batch IPS officer. Rtd.) - Chairman
- Sri Suresh prasad Chaudhary - Member
- Sri Pankaj Sinha- Member Secretary
- Praveen Kumar (Joint Secretary Transport, Patna) - Member

== See also ==
- Union Public Service Commission
- Bihar Public Service Commission
