= Multifunctional =

Multi-function(al) describes something that is capable of performing multiple functions or serving various purposes effectively. Specifically, it may refer to:

- Multi-function structure
- Multifunctional furniture
- Multi-function printer (a.k.a. 'multifunctional' in a narrower sense)
- Multi-tool
- Multi-function display
- Multi-touch
- Multi-Functional Transport Satellite
- Multifunctional Information Distribution System
- Multifunctional Support Ship

== See also ==
- Multifunction Polis
- Versatility
