= Sunidhi Chauhan =

Indian singer (born 1983)

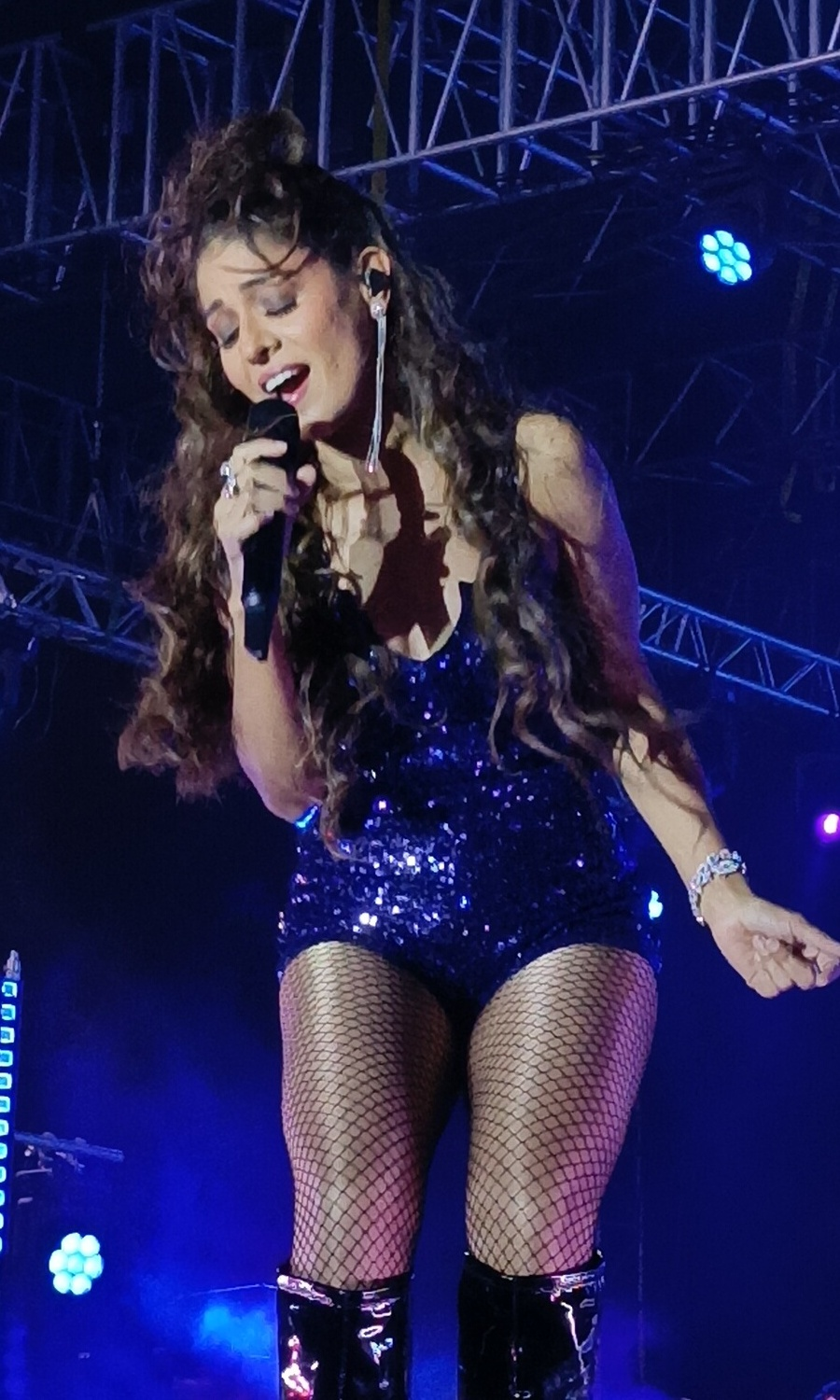
- Chauhan performing in Delhi, c. 2024
- Born: Nidhi Chauhan; 14 August 1983 (age 43); New Delhi, India
- Occupation: Singer
- Years active: 1996–present
- Spouse(s): Bobby Khan (m. 2002; div. 2003) Hitesh Sonik (m. 2012)
- Children: 1
- Musical career
- Genres: Filmi; pop; Indian classical music; rock; Sufi; EDM
- Instrument: Vocals
- Labels: Universal Music Group; T-Series; Tips; Sony Music India; Saregama

Sunidhi Dushyant Chauhan (pronounced [sʊnɪd̪ʱiː ʧɔːɦäːn]; born Nidhi Chauhan, 14 August 1983) is an Indian playback singer. Known for her bold vocal range and versatility, she has recorded songs for films in several Indian languages and received accolades including three Filmfare Awards and a Filmfare Award South.

Born in Delhi, she began performing at local gatherings at the age of 4 and made her career debut at the age of 13, with the film Shastra (1996). During the year, she won the first singing reality show titled Meri Awaz Suno and rose to prominence after recording "Ruki Ruki Si Zindagi" from Mast (1999). It won her Filmfare RD Burman Award for New Music Talent and was nominated for the Best Female Playback Singer. She is known for her versatility as a vocalist.

Her second breakthrough was released in 2000, with the song "Mehboob Mere" from Fiza, for which she received another Filmfare nomination. Sunidhi received her third Filmfare nomination with the song Dhoom Machale from Dhoom (2004) followed by two more nominations during the next year for "Kaisi Paheli" from Parineeta and "Deedar De" from Dus (2005). In 2006, she was bestowed with her first Filmfare award for her rendition of the song "Beedi Jalaile" from Omkara and two further nominations for "Soniye" from Aksar and "Aashiqui Main" from 36 China Town.

The following year, Chauhan recorded the title song of Aaja Nachle (2007) and "Sajnaaji Vaari", both critically and commercially well received. Chauhan received her twelfth Filmfare nomination with "Chor Bazaari" of Love Aaj Kal (2009) preceded by "Dance Pe Chance" from Rab Ne Bana Di Jodi (2008). In 2010, she received her second Filmfare award with the item song "Sheila Ki Jawani" (2010) and was nominated for international styled carnival song "Udi" from Guzaarish (2010). The year marked her International singing debut, where she was featured in an alternate version of the song "Heartbeat" by Enrique Iglesias.

Apart from playback singing, Chauhan has appeared as a judge on several television reality shows and she also appears in music videos. Besides her career in music, she has also been involved in various charities and social causes. She has appeared four times in Forbes Celebrity 100 of India (2012–2015).

== Early life ==
Sunidhi Chauhan was born on 14 August 1983, in New Delhi, India into a Rajput family. Her father, Dushyant Kumar Chauhan, who is from Bulandshahr, Uttar Pradesh, is a theatre personality at the Shriram Bharatiya Kala Kendra. Her mother, a homemaker, influenced Chauhan to pursue a career in music. She also has a younger sister. At the age of four, Chauhan started performing at competitions and local gatherings, subsequently convinced by her father's friends to take singing seriously. During that time, she was doing live shows and trained herself with "regular riyaaz by listening to cassettes and CDs of popular numbers".

She did her studies from Greenway Modern School and used to stay with her family members in Dilshad Garden, Delhi. She discontinued her studies right after schooling to pursue a career in the music industry. She said: "I quit because I did not feel like studying. I made the decision to pursue my dream as a singer and I don't regret it one bit".

When actress Tabassum spotted her, she made her sing live in her show Tabassum Hit Parade and asked her family to shift to Mumbai. She then introduced Chauhan to Kalyanji Virji Shah and Anandji Virji Shah. Upon meeting, Kalyanji changed her name from Nidhi to Sunidhi as he felt that it is a lucky name. When she was 11, her dad quit his job and brought her to Mumbai. Initially, the family had financial difficulties in adjusting life to the city. After that she worked in Kalyanji's academy for few years and became the lead singer in his "Little Wonders" troupe. She was then offered many shows, though her father insisted on her singing for films.

== Career ==
=== 1995–2000: Career beginnings, Mast and Fiza ===
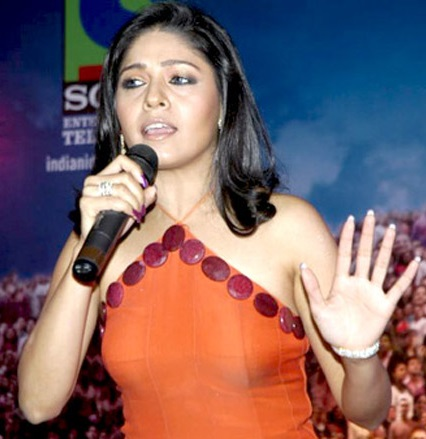
Chauhan performing at an event in 2006

In 1995, Chauhan performed at the 40th Filmfare Awards with the group "Little Wonders", when late music director Aadesh Shrivastava heard her and recorded her voice for the film, Shastra. She made her career debut at the age of thirteen, with the song "Ladki Deewani Dekho" from the film, alongside Udit Narayan. During the year, she won the first singing reality show on DD National titled Meri Awaz Suno, where she was honoured with the "Lata Mangeshkar Trophy" for the best female singer of India. Besides, she recorded her first solo album, Aira Gaira Nathu Khaira which was ultimately promoted as a children's album. Chauhan then realised her "limitations" and got formal training in classical singing from Gautam Mukherjee. For the next two years, she worked as a background vocalist.

Chauhan met singer Sonu Nigam, who recommended her to Sandeep Chowta. During the time, Chowta was working as the music director for Ram Gopal Varma's film Mast (1999). Within two weeks' time, Chauhan was signed to lend her voice for the film's song where she recorded the title track along with "Ruki Ruki Si Zindagi" and "Suna Tha". For the song "Ruki Ruki Si", she won the RD Burman award, at the Annual Filmfare awards, and was nominated for the Best Female Playback Singer, at the same ceremony. By the end of the year, she worked with Anand–Milind for Jaanwar and with Shrivastava for two films: Dahek and Bade Dilwala.

Chauhan's second breakthrough was released in 2000, where she collaborated with composer-singer Anu Malik, for the song "Mehboob Mere" from Fiza which was picturised on Sushmita Sen. She considered the track that came to her the "most naturally", as recording of the song was completed in 15 minutes. Chauhan received another Filmfare nomination for Best Female Playback Singer for "Mehboob Mere". She was also heard in Shankar–Ehsaan–Loy-composed folksy flavoured "Bumbro" from Mission Kashmir, which was promoted from being a "background song into the foreground" because of "its beauty". The director of the film, Vidhu Vinod Chopra, wanted an innocent voice for the song when he roped Chauhan to sing for Preity Zinta. According to Chopra, "Chauhan could sound very girlish. So she sang the song with that slightly broken voice."

=== 2001–05: Ajnabee, Chameli and Dhoom ===
In 2001, Chauhan was featured in four tracks from the album of Ajnabee. Mandeep Bhara of PlanetBollywood described her rendition of Adnan Sami-duet "Mehbooba Mehbooba" as effortless, when talking about her Kumar Sanu-duet "Meri Zindagi Mein Ajnabee" he said "Sunidhi Chauhan adds pure electricity to the song with her sizzling rendition leaving Kumar Sanu struggling to make an impact". Both the songs were highly successful and highlighted Chauhan's versatility. "Meri Zindagi Mein Ajnabee" was her first romantic song. She credited Malik for playing a major role in her "evolution", as he "fought" with the producers to give her the songs, because of that she was "accepted in typical heroines romantic numbers". She then lent her voice for "Ek Baar Pyar" for Anand Raj Anand and "Yeh Kaisa Ehsaas Hai" for Milind Sagar; both from Ehsaas: The Feeling (2001) and a duet with Nigam. Besides, she was heard in Malik's Yaadein; "Alaap", "Jab Dil Miley" and "Yaadein Yaad Aati Hain" were critically acclaimed.

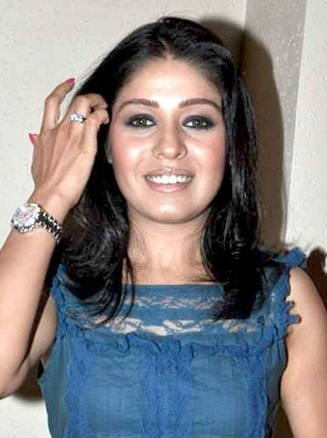
Chauhan at Michael Learns to Rock concert, 2010

Chauhan collaborated with Malik for four films during the year 2002. Apart from the title track, she performed three other songs; "Maine To Khai Kasam", "More Sawariya" and "Ya Habibi" for the film Awara Paagal Deewana. During the year, she teamed up with Ismail Darbar for the first time and released the song "Ai Ajnabi" from Deewangee which she described as her most difficult song. Apart from featuring in the soundtrack album of Himesh Reshammiya's film Humraaz, Chauhan worked with M.M. Kreem for Sur – The Melody of Life, where she performed "Aa Bhi Ja" and "Dil Mein Jaagi Dhadkan Aise"; which she considered "hummable" and different from her "usual style". According to critic Priyanka Bhattacharya, "Chauhan's matured rendition surprises in the second half of "Aa Bhi Ja" and mentioned that other track is also "equally good".

Chauhan made her second screen appearance in 2003 with Ram Gopal Varma-directed Bhoot, where she was featured in the promotional music video of "Bhoot Hoon Main", composed by Salim–Sulaiman. According to Malik, he roped in Chauhan to playback for Kareena Kapoor in two songs of Main Prem Ki Diwani Hoon, since "Chauhan came in for the passion, as she understands [him] in such songs". She later worked with him for the song "Dekh Le" from Munna Bhai M.B.B.S.. In 2004, she collaborated with Sandesh Shandilya for Chameli. Chameli was a significant album in Chauhan's career as she sang all tracks for the album, out of which Chauhan received most recognition with the songs "Bhaage Re Mann" and "Sajna Ve Sajna". Her higher octave "carefree delivery" of the former was appreciated by the critics while she chose the latter as her "personal favorite" song in her career.

Chauhan received her third Filmfare nomination for Best Female Playback Singer for the song "Dhoom Machaale" from Dhoom (2004), which was a critical and commercial success. Besides, Chauhan performed four tracks for Garv, composed by Sajid–Wajid. However, music critics labelled her "stereotyped" and noted that "all her songs sound alike". Also, "Saiyan" from Garv is "no different" from A.R. Rahman-composed "Saiyyan" of Nayak (2001). One of the dance numbers released during the year was "Aisa Jadoo" from Khakee composed by Ram Sampath, followed by "Ishq Kabhi Kario Na" and "Saaki" from Musafir. Reportedly, Sampath asked Chauhan to stand two feet away from the mike while recording the song "Aisa Jadoo", as the "equipment couldn't handle her pumped-up voice throw." In her review of Musafir, Verma wrote: "Chauhan's husky vocals do complete justice to "Ishq Kabhi Kario Na" by adding just the right amount of sauciness and oomph."

2005 marked the first collaboration of Chauhan with composer Shantanu Moitra where she recorded "Aao Nee Kudiyon" for 7½ Phere and the seductive track "Kaisi Paheli Zindagani" for Parineeta. Sahaya Ranjit from India Today called her voice a "westernised edge" and "sensuous texture" with a jazz influence in her rendition. Apart from recording the Rajasthani folk influenced "Phir Raat Kati" in Paheli, alongside Sukhwinder Singh, she was heard in a slow pace club number "Jadoo" from Padmashree Laloo Prasad Yadav. During the year, she performed with Abhishek Bachchan in Vishal-Shekhar's composition, "Right Here Right Now" from Bluffmaster!. She worked with Vishal-Shekhar in few other compositions including Dus (2005) and Shabd (2005). She was heard in "Chahaton Ka Silsila"—duet with Kumar Sanu, "Khoya Khoya"—duet with Sonu Nigam and "Sholon Si"—duet with Vishal Dadlani, from Shabd. Chauhan received two more Filmfare award nominations for her rendition of the song "Deedar De" from Dus and "Kaisi Paheli Zindagani" of Parineeta. Apparently, Sonu Nigam picked her as the most outstanding voice of 2005, for her rendition of those songs.

=== 2006–09: Omkara, Aaja Nachle and Rab Ne Bana Di Jodi ===
Chauhan was bestowed with her first Filmfare Award for her rendition of the song "Beedi Jalaile" from Omkara (2006). The song being a critical and commercial success, Bipasha Basu—who was featured in the song—said: "Sunidhi is a goddess. Her singing is so powerful. She added another dimension to my dancing". She received two further nominations during the year for "Soniye" from Aksar and "Aashiqui Main" from 36 China Town. Apart from the latter, she worked with Himesh Reshammiya in ten other films. Songs like "Keh Do Naa" and "Meethi Meethi Baataan" from Aap Ki Khatir, along with "Ishq Kiya Kiya" and "Let's Rock" from Anthony Kaun Hai? were moderately received by the critics. Chauhan made her third screen appearance with the promotional song "Dheemey Dheemey" from Bas Ek Pal, along with KK. She performed with him for two other tracks, "Ashq Bhi" and "Hai Ishq Ye Kya Ek Khata" for the film, where all the songs were critically favoured. Komal Nahta wrote: "Sunidhi Chauhan and KK have sung brilliantly throughout the album. They have modified their style to convey the feel and emotion of every song".

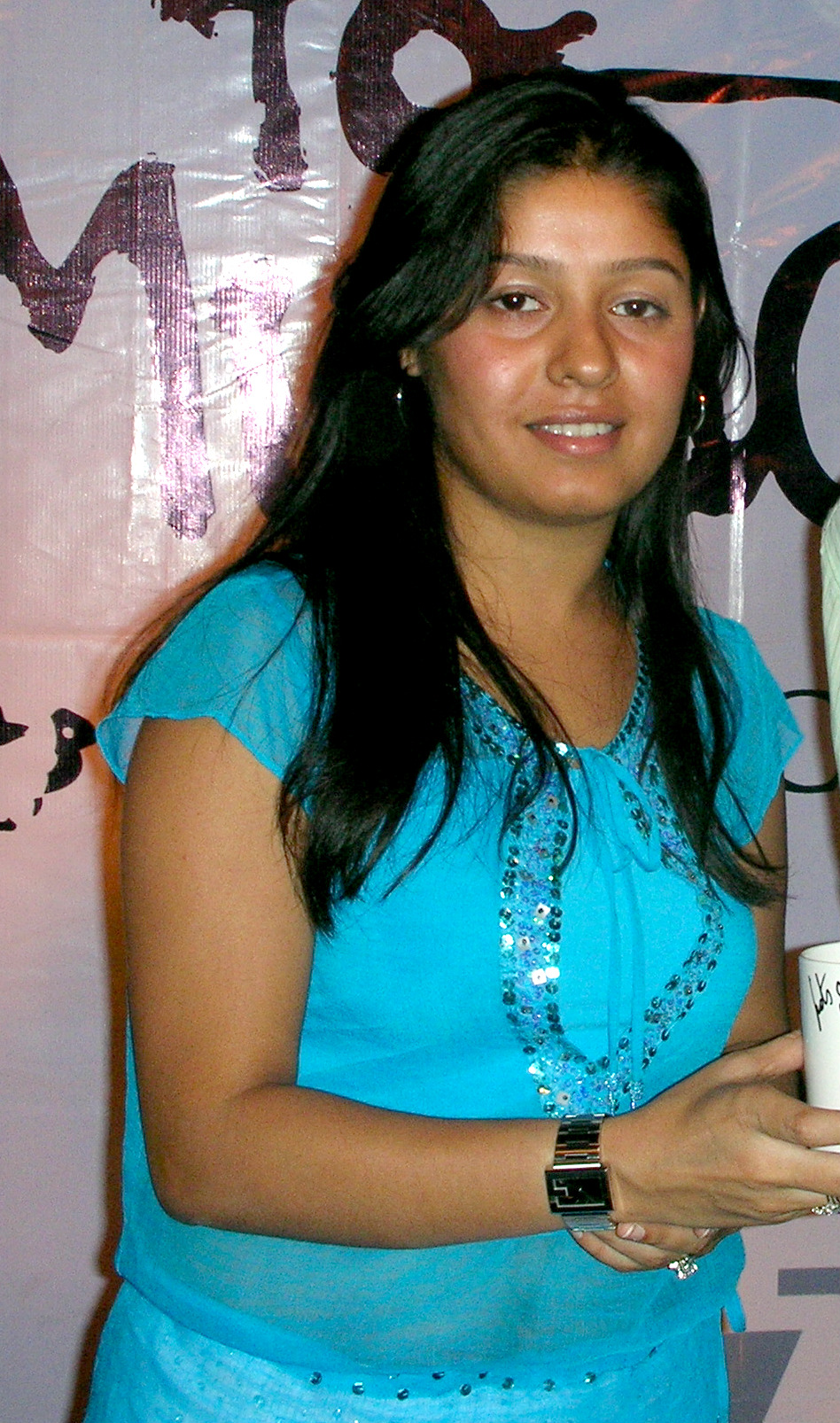
Chauhan after performing in a concert, 2006

Chauhan's collaboration with Pritam during the year was appreciated by the music critics. Her rendition of "Tere Bin", "Aa Kushi Se Khud Kushi Karle" and Opera-style singing of "Afreen" was well received. Besides, their work in "Crazy Kiya Re" of Dhoom 2 was widely acclaimed, however Gangster's "Lamha Lamha" was labelled as a "romantic irritant" song by Rediff.com. During the year, she performed her only duet with Shreya Ghoshal—though they have contributed in multi-singer songs together—with the Salim–Sulaiman's composition, "Imaan Ka Asar" from Dor. Apart from rendering two soft tracks, "Mere Haath Mein" and "Dekho Na" for Jatin–Lalit composed Fanaa, Chauhan voiced for the remixed track of "Yeh Mera Dil" which was originally sung by Asha Bhosle. According to Rediff.com; "The usually confident Sunidhi Chauhan appears to be conscious of inevitable comparisons to Asha Bhosle's version of the same". The song, which was included in the soundtrack of the 2006 film Don, was met with mixed reactions; some people considered her voice more huskier than it requires, while other complimented her vocals. However, she personally felt that the song would sound much better if she had "sung the song on a higher note". Moreover, she also performed the English language song "Reach Out" at the opening ceremony of the 2006 Asian Games at Doha.

In 2007, Chauhan lent her voice for Madhuri Dixit in her comeback film Aaja Nachle, where she rendered "Soniye Mil Ja" along with Sukhwinder Singh and "Koi Patthar Se Naa Maare" alongside Nigam and Ghoshal, apart from the title track. In spite of rendering the title track for Shankar-Ehsaan-Loy composed Jhoom Barabar Jhoom, Chauhan lent her voice for Shantanu Moitra in Laaga Chunari Mein Daag, where she performed "Hum To Aise Hain" along with Ghoshal which also had Swanand Kirkire and Pranab Biswas lending supporting vocals. In a review from Rediff.com, Raja Sen wrote; "The two-sister song works, from moustache-and-cow similes to paan spits to a fantastic 3–2–1–2–7–2 count, the female vocalists doing the upbeat words justice". However, he found "Kachchi Kaliyaan" from the same film less appealing with its "bad remix background" though praised Chauhan, Ghoshal, KK and Nigam for giving the song the "required vim". Besides, she recorded the soft romantic melody song "Hey Shona" for Vishal-Shekhar for whom she performed "Pyaar Ki Yeh Kahani" and "Sajnaaji Vaari Vaari" from Honeymoon Travels Pvt. Ltd., which resulted in another Filmfare nomination along with "Aaja Nachle".

Chauhan received her eleventh Filmfare nomination for Best Playback Singer Award with Salim–Sulaiman's composition, "Dance Pe Chance" from Rab Ne Bana Di Jodi (2008). Apart from rendering the club dance song "Lucky Boy" from Vishal-Shekhar's Bachna Ae Haseeno, Chauhan provided vocals for "Dekho Nashe Mein", "Mujh Pe Jadoo", "Race Saason Ki" and its "high-on-English lyrics" version titled "Race Is on My Mind" for Pritam-composed Race, which were equally well received for its energy on vocals and composition. Another release of the year, "Desi Girl" from Dostana was a commercial success. She later worked with Vishal Bhardwaj for U Me Aur Hum, where she recorded both "Phatte" and "Saiyaan" along with Adnan Sami. Besides, Chauhan dubbed for Kareena Kapoor with her "husky vocals" in the song "Chhaliya" and "Dil Dance Maare", included in the soundtrack album of Tashan.

2009 marks Chauhan's second collaboration with Ilaiyaraaja by singing "Batla De Koyi" from Chal Chalein and "Hichki Hichki" from Paa. In a review of the latter by Sify, they considered it a "situational number that does not impress too much". During the year, Chauhan received critical acclaim with the Vishal Bhardwaj-composed "Raat Ke Dhai Baje" from Kaminey for having a "seamless" transition of alternating voices by Chauhan and co-singer Rekha Bhardwaj. Along with "Gazab" from Aa Dekhen Zara, Chauhan worked with Pritam in Dil Bole Hadippa! and performed the club song "Hotty Naughty" for De Dana Dan. Despite the positive response received for songs like "Chor Bazaari" from Love Aaj Kal, Chauhan was criticised for her pronunciation in the title track of Kambakkht Ishq, composed by Anu Malik. Chauhan received another Filmfare nomination for the former. During the year, she also worked with Sajid–Wajid for films Main Aurr Mrs Khanna and Wanted where she performed both "Happening" and "Mrs. Khanna" for the former and both "Ishq Vishq" and "Tose Pyar Karte Hain" for the latter.

=== 2010–13: Euphoria, Guzaarish and Tees Maar Khan ===
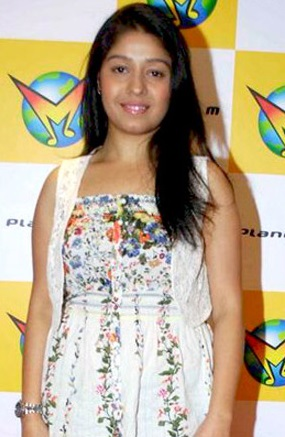
Chauhan promoting Enrique Iglesias's album Euphoria, 2010

2010 marked Chauhan's international singing debut, where she featured in an alternate version of the song "Heartbeat" titled as "Heartbeat (India Mix)" alongside Spanish recording artist Enrique Iglesias, included on a Special Indian Edition of Euphoria. During the year, she performed a holi number, "Chhan Ke Mohalla" from Action Replayy and a fast-paced Punjabi flavoured dance number "Ainvayi Ainvayi" from Band Baaja Baaraat. The year marked her only collaboration with Sanjay Leela Bhansali, where she recorded the international styled carnival song "Udi" from Guzaarish. Complimenting her "fiery" vocals in the song, Sukanya Verma wrote: "Sunidhi Chauhan aims to burn the floor with her fiery, spunky performance in Udi". She was also part of the soundtrack album Housefull, where she performed "Aapka Kya Hoga (Dhanno)" and "I Don't Know What To Do" in her usual "sensuous voice". Apart from recording the title track and "Sanu Guzra Zamana" for Reshammiya's Kajraare, Chauhan was heard in Pritam's cabaret number "Parda" from Once Upon a Time in Mumbaai which has influences of "Piya Tu" and "Duniya Mein" while brought in an improvised "true retro feel".

During the year, Chauhan collaborated with Vishal-Shekhar for three projects; Break Ke Baad, I Hate Luv Storys and Tees Maar Khan. Both the songs, "Bin Tere" from I Hate Luv Storys and "Sheila Ki Jawani" from Tees Maar Khan were commercial success and were included in The Express Tribune's "Top 10 Bollywood songs of 2010". Described as the "hottest item song of the year", the latter song, along with its crew, faced controversy over the "raunchy" lyrics, though Chauhan felt that the "song has been written in sync with the storyline of the film and does not intend to hurt the female sentiments". She won her second Filmfare Award for Best Female Playback Singer for "Sheila Ki Jawani" and was nominated in the same category for "Udi". During the year, she appeared as a judge alongside Anu Malik and Salim Merchant in the 5th season of the Indian television music competition, Indian Idol. Along with ten other artists, she performed a 30-minute segment titled the Universal Music of Love comprising Sufi, folk, Indipop and world music performances during the 2010 Commonwealth Games closing ceremony.

In 2011, Chauhan collaborated with Pritam for four films, out of which she was praised for her rendition of the slow-paced track "Te Amo" from Dum Maaro Dum. Her performance in Sangeet-Siddharth composed sensuous club song "Aa Zara" from Murder 2 was widely acclaimed both critically and commercially. The year marked her first collaboration with her husband Hitesh Sonik with the song "Tu" from My Friend Pinto. Besides, she recorded the Sufi inflected love ballad "Ishq Sufiyana" and the disco nightclub song "Honeymoon Ki Raat", for Vishal-Shekhar's The Dirty Picture. Complimenting her vocal range and flexibility, Verma wrote: "To Sunidhi's credit, she imbues her brand of spice and spunk to Rajat Arora's [...] lines without making it in-your-face".

In 2012, Chauhan appeared as a judge for the second time with the 6th season of Indian Idol. She teamed up with Amit Trivedi for the lavani track "Sava Dollar" from Aiyyaa, where her "boisterous and bouncy voice" was praised along with her Marathi accent. The duo also worked with another Marathi styled song "Navrai Majhi" for Sridevi's comeback film, English Vinglish, followed by the energetic "Chokra Jawaan" from Ishaqzaade. She worked with Ajay–Atul by recording "Gun Gun Guna" from Agneepath along with Udit Narayan. Two of the other well received songs were recorded with Pritam; "Kyon" from Barfi! and "Yaariyan" from Cocktail, performed with Papon for the former and Arijit Singh for the latter. Besides, Chauhan performed some item songs during the year, including songs like "Halkat Jawani", "Kafirana", "The Disco Song" and "Laila". While reviewing the soundtrack album of Heroine, NDTV wrote: "Chauhan, the queen of item songs, is flawless [in the song "Halkat Jawani"]. The way she croons Aaja in the beginning is simply mind-blowing". Besides she provided her voice to the character of Sita in the animated film Sons of Ram.

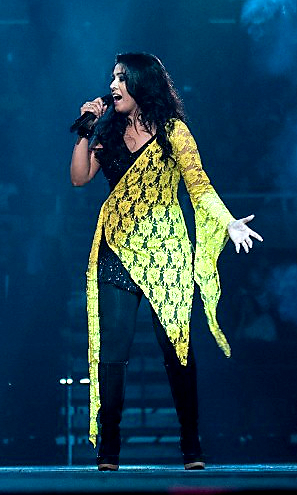
Chauhan performing at Times of India Film Awards, 2013

Chauhan collaborated with the Pakistani band Junoon and sung songs like "Galiyan Galiyan Husan Diyaan" for Mohabbataan Sachiyaan (2007), "Aap Dil Ke Anjuman Mein" and "Dil Dharke Main Tum Se" for Anjuman (2013), which brought her fame and recognition in the country. She was part of the song "Apna Bombay Talkies" from Bombay Talkies which celebrated the 100th year of Indian cinema. In the song, the singers recorded for actors whom they generally do the playback singing, and Chauhan dubbed for Priyanka Chopra. She performed a high pitched rendition of the energetic "Tu Hi Khwahish" for Once Upon Ay Time in Mumbai Dobaara! which was the counterpart of "Parda" from the prequel. She again worked with Pritam for performing the reprise version of "Janam Janam" of Phata Poster Nikhla Hero and "Mat Maari" for R... Rajkumar where Rajiv Vijayakar of Bollywood Hungama appraised Chauhan for "dominating" the song.

During the year, Chauhan voiced for Sonakshi Sinha—who expressed her interest to dub for Chauhan in a reality show—for the first time for the disco song "Thank God It's Friday" from Himmatwala composed by Sachin–Jigar. She recorded another track "Dhoka Dhoka" for the same film, composed by Sajid–Wajid, performed along with Mamta Sharma. The song was tagged as, when "Munni and Sheila" joins together, since the former was performed by Sharma and latter by Chauhan during the year 2010 and shared the Filmfare trophy for their respective songs. Chauhan teamed up with Anu Malik for performing retro club songs "Aala Re Aala", "Ek Din Ke Liye" and "Babli Badmaash" for Shootout at Wadala which NDTV mentioned that she is an "expert" in crooning such songs. Another track composed by Pritam and performed along with Arijit Singh was met with mixed response with the music critics, where Mohar Basu from Koimoi thought Chauhan's "unsurpassable energy" fails in the song along with other factors. The year marks her first ever collaboration with Atif Aslam where the duo recorded the mellow track "Be Intehaan" for Race 2. Chauhan made her debut in the domain of Rabindra Sangeet for the album Tagore & We – 2, where she recorded four tracks for the album.

=== 2014–17: Dil Dhadakne Do and Rangoon ===
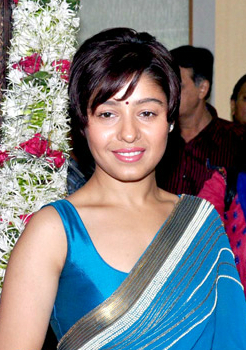
Chauhan in 2014

Chauhan's first release of 2014 was the Vishal-Shekhar composed "Punjabi Wedding Song" from Hasee Toh Phasee, which was a duet with Benny Dayal. The "foot-tapping number" became popular at weddings that were scheduled soon after the film. She was next heard in Rahman's traditional tuned "Tu Kuja" from Highway. According to The Times of India, "Though a devotional number, Chauhan's voice mixed with the music creates a very Western effect" to the song. Apart from rendering Hitesh Sonik-composed "Ghoom Gayi" included in the album Hawaa Hawaai, She made an on-screen appearance in its music promotional video. Moreover, Chauhan performed the "Mardaani Anthem" from Mardaani which was about women empowerment. During the year, she recorded the track "Adhure" from Mary Kom sung in her "gentle", "soft" voice. Apart from rendering "Qawali and rock fused" title track of Daawat-e-Ishq along with Javed Ali, she collaborated with Vishal-Shekhar again for Happy New Year's "Dance Like a Chammiya". She then made her second appearance in a music video, titled "Baal Khade" from Khoobsurat, along with composer Sneha Khanwalkar and Sonam Kapoor. She also lent her voice for the recreated version of Rajasthani folk song "Engine Ki Seeti" from the film. Apart from Bollywood films, Chauhan lent her voice to the title track of the romantic thriller TV series Ek Hasina Thi.

Chauhan's first release of 2015 was Sajid–Wajid's peppy Punjabi track "Phatte Tak Nachna" from Dolly Ki Doli, which was recorded in one and a half-hour. She also performed a jazz style number, "Girls Like To Swing" for Shankar–Ehsaan–Loy in Dil Dhadakne Do, which Chauhan considered as a type of song that she has not "attempted before". The Indian Express appraised how Chauhan "crooned her lungs out" and "fitting the vocals in difficult structures" by not missing "even a quarter of a beat". Moreover, Chauhan recorded the title track of Piku where Surabhi Redkar from Koimoi felt that her "gifted bright voice" failed to "upbeat feel" of the song.

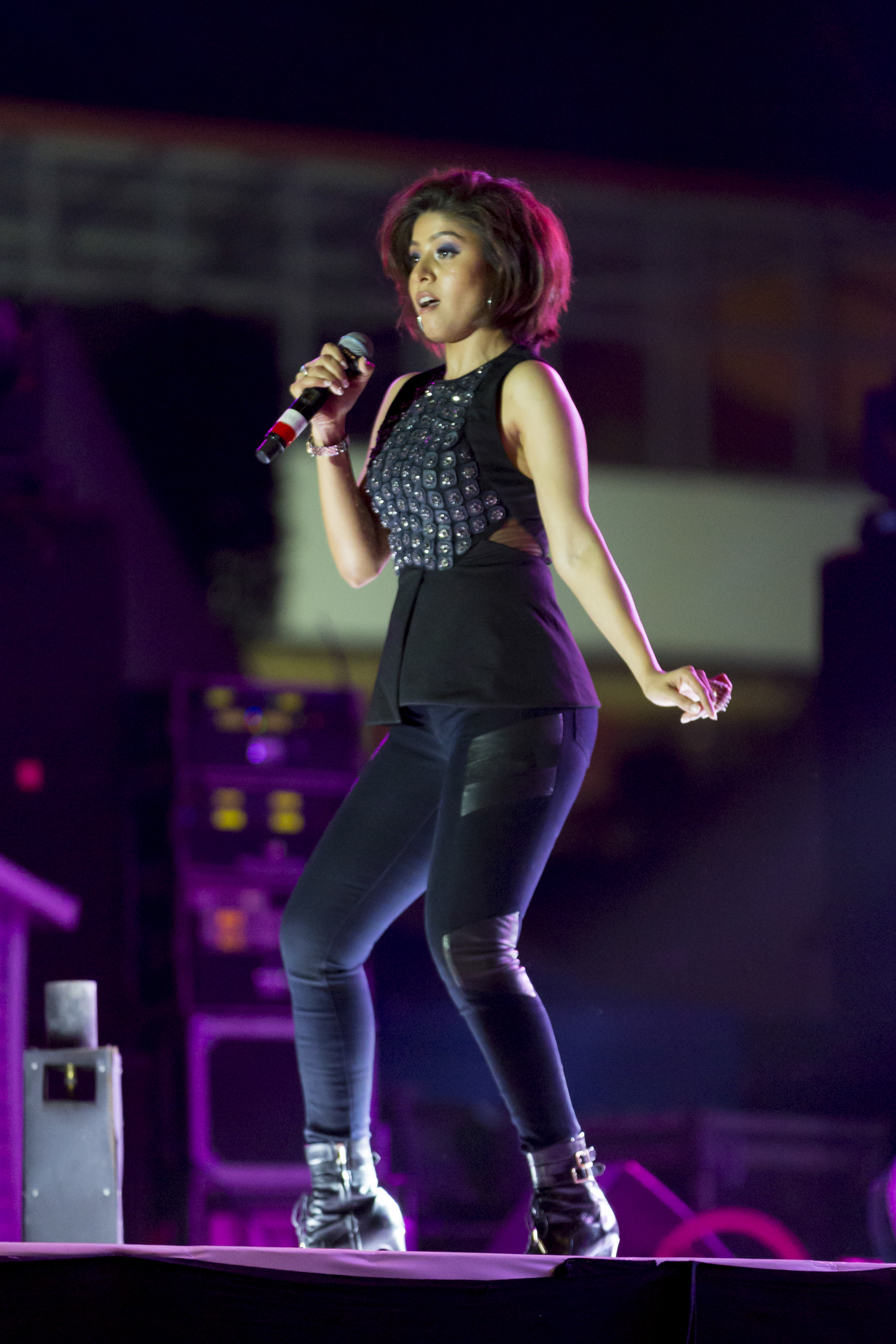
Chauhan performing at an event in 2015

Apart from rendering the song "Janib" from Dilliwali Zaalim Girlfriend along with Arijit Singh in the duet version, she recorded Krsna Solo-composed "Move On" from Tanu Weds Manu Returns which India West labelled Chauhan as "brilliant", though Redkar from Koimoi was "surprised" how Chauhan had no problems singing a song that "seems like a blatant copy of her other song", "Bol Beliya" from Kill Dil. Chauhan represented India at the 2015 Global Citizen Festival in New York City, where she performed on the stage alongside Coldplay, Pearl Jam, Beyoncé and others.

In 2016, Chauhan worked with Trivedi in two films; Fitoor and Dear Zindagi. "Ranga Re" performed alongside Trivedi and "Tere Liye", a duet with Jubin Nautiyal from the former were applauded for its arrangements and vocals. Complimenting her "restrained vocals" in the album, Swetha Ramakrishnan reviewing from Firstpost wrote: "Tere Liye is a loud cry to music directors to use Chauhan in such songs, because she sounds absolutely fantastic when she holds back a tad bit". She continued to gain critical praise as she sang with "easy switches from desolation to angst around the title refrain" for the song "Just Go To Hell Dil" from Dear Zindagi. She performed the songs "Aisa Kyun Maa" from Neerja which was well received due to its theme; portrayal of love between a mother and daughter. Apart from recording the track "Lamhon Ke Rasgulle" for Clinton Cerejo-composed Kahaani 2: Durga Rani Singh, she sang "Titliyan" from Rocky Handsome in 1950s cabaret style. Among all her releases, she picked Mithoon-composed "Darkhaast" from Shivaay and Vishal–Shekhar's "Je t'aime" from Befikre as her personal favourite tracks of the year. In the year, she made her acting debut with Arif Ali-directed urban thriller short film, Playing Priya in which she played the role of an urban housewife. Film critics were generally disappointed with the film but particularly praised Chauhan's performance; Namrata Thakker of Rediff.com noted, "[She] is quite impressive, as she doesn't have too many dialogues, and yet manages to convey her feelings through her expressions".

In January 2017, Vishal Bhardwaj released two songs of Chauhan; "Bloody Hell" and "Tippa", recorded for the soundtrack album of Rangoon. Her rendition for both the tracks met with positive response from critics; Redkar from Koimoi noted, "Chauhan brings life into this song with her vocals as she croons it with the required nakhra". Ashwin Vinayan of Deccan Herald picked "Tippa"—performed with Sukhwinder Singh and Rekha Bhardwaj—as "one of the classiest multi-star efforts in recent Bollywood music memory". In spite of rendering the song, she also made a special appearance in "Bloody Hell". She was next heard in a Rochak Kohli composition; "Zinda" from Naam Shabana. She contributed to the album of Jab Harry Met Sejal by performing "Radha" with Shahid Mallya and "Butterfly" alongside Aman Trikha, Nooran Sisters and Dev Negi. Both songs met with mixed reception from critics; Vipin Nair of The Hindu appreciated Chauhan's rendition of "Radha" while criticising "Butterfly" as a "noisy mishmash". She was next heard in a duet with Sukhwinder Singh; "Bakheda" from Toilet: Ek Prem Katha. Debarati Sen from The Times of India admired the track and praised her for bringing "the playful and folksy romance alive" with her rendition. Sen was equally pleased with her "slow and soulful" rendition of Sachin–Jigar composed "Pinjra Tod Ke" from Simran. Also, she recorded the anthem of 2017 AIBA World Boxing Championships, a song mix of Hindi, English and Assamese lyrics blended with a rap performed by her.

=== 2018–present: Continued work in Hindi films and expansion in non-film music ===
Chauhan continued to record for Hindi films, beginning with "Lae Dooba" from Aiyaary (2018) and "Manwaa" from October (2018). She also recorded "Ae Watan" for Raazi and "Main Badhiya Tu Bhi Badhiya", a duet with Sonu Nigam, for Sanju. The latter song required her to manipulate her voice to produce an exaggerated twang inspired by singer Shamshad Begum. Later that year, she sang "Mohabbat" and "Halka Halka Suroor" for Fanney Khan. Chauhan also returned to judging with the reality television show The Remix alongside Amit Trivedi and Nucleya.

In 2019, Chauhan recorded songs including "Bheege Bheege" from Amavas, "Vaddi Sharaban" from De De Pyaar De, "Udta Teetar" from Saand Ki Aankh, and "Bharat Salaam" from Hotel Mumbai. Her subsequent film work included "Maskari" from Dil Bechara (2020), composed by A. R. Rahman and performed with Hriday Gattani, as well as "Rani Hindustani" and "Pass Nahi Toh Fail Nahi" from Shakuntala Devi.

In 2021, she recorded "Aayi Aayi Bhoot Police" for Bhoot Police, "Dhik Chik" for Bunty Aur Babli 2, and "Chingari" for Antim: The Final Truth. She also provided the Hindi vocals for "Saami Saami" from Pushpa: The Rise. The Hindi version was recorded by Chauhan, while the original Telugu version was performed by Mounika Yadav. She also sung the song, "Ghar Aao Na" from Salim-Sulaiman's album Bhoomi 2021.

In 2022, her recordings included "So Ja Re" and "Barood" from Dhaakad, "Yoddha" from Samrat Prithviraj, and "The Voice of Anek" from Anek. She also recorded "Ra Ra Rakamma" for the Hindi version of the Kannada film Vikrant Rona, alongside Nakash Aziz.

In 2023, Chauhan recorded "Khoon Ki Khushboo" for Kuttey, "Show Me the Thumka" with Shashwat Singh for Tu Jhoothi Main Makkaar, "Mai Marjawangi" for Dream Girl 2, and "Machade Tabahi" for Farrey. She also contributed songs to the soundtrack of the web series Jubilee, including "Babuji Bhole", "Nahin Ji Nahin", "Vo Tere Mere" and "Itni Si Hi Dastaan".

In 2024, Chauhan recorded "Jahan Se Chale The" for Auron Mein Kahan Dum Tha and "Sajna Ve Sajna" for Vicky Vidya Ka Woh Wala Video. The latter is a recreation of her own song from the 2004 film Chameli. The recreated version was released in October 2024. She also collaborated with electronic duo Rusha & Blizza on the non-film single "Aankh", which was composed by Prateeksha Srivastava. Actress Sanya Malhotra performed alongside Chauhan in the music video, which received widespread praise. She also featured on the song "Bhari Mehfil", from Indian rapper Ikka's third studio album, Only Love Gets Reply and on the duet "Chhaila", alongside Shreya Ghoshal, from Salim-Sulaiman's album Bhoomi 2024.

In 2025, her film recordings included "Sultana" from Be Happy, "Dholida Dhol Nagada" from Kesari Veer, "Ek Main Aur Ek Tu" from Hai Junoon!, "Aali Ga" from Pune Highway, and "Tamancha" from Ufff Yeh Siyapaa. She also recorded "Chor Bazari Phir Se" for Bhool Chuk Maaf and "Dil Dil Dil" for Ek Deewane Ki Deewaniyat. In November, she performed at the ICC Women's Cricket World Cup final during the mid-innings break. She embarked on her first solo tour, called the I Am Home tour in December. The tour was a huge success, and received widespread praise for her performances.

In 2026, she featured on the song "Ye Dil Mujhko Tu Dede", from Indian singer King's sixth studio album Raja Hindustani. She lent her vocals to the duet "Tujhko", alongside Arijit Singh, from the soundtrack of the film Cocktail 2. She further featured on the song, "Mumbai Sapno Ka Samandar", alongside rapper Emiway Bantai, from the soundtrack of the film, Prahaar: The Untold Story of Ujjwal Nikam, which was released in October 2026.

== Artistry ==
=== Voice ===
Chauhan possesses a high octave vocal range, and has the ability to reach lower octaves and dropping notes with transition. The Indian Express described her as a soprano, though criticising her "high-pitched non-falsetto voice because of the "squeakiness it acquires while belting out those notes". Lata Mangeshkar who described Chauhan's vocals as "different" from her contemporary, mentioned that her voice will not suit musical style of lori. Lyricist Prasoon Joshi described Chauhan as an effervescent and soulful singer who can lend her voice to any situation. Director Ram Gopal Varma calling her an extraordinary talent, said "I think it's the various facets of her personality, that is so full of life and energy, which come through in a musical way in her diverse songs". Chauhan has the ability to change her tonal quality with a lot of ease and charisma. According to Rajani Kanikar, she has a "powerful" and "husky" voice which she attributes to her father. Music composer Amit Trivedi considers Chauhan to be the most versatile female singer after Asha Bhosle who is good with all the genres. She feels that her vocals structure suits on Priyanka Chopra, Katrina Kaif, Kajol, Parineeti Chopra and Urmila Matondkar the most. According to The Daily Star, "be it a soft classical-like piece or an operatic pitch, Chauhan is spectacular with her vocals". Though she has performs in high-pitched vocals songs, she is known for her "deeper pitched voice", on which Ajay Gehlawat wrote: "Chauhan's deeper timbre replaces Asha Bhosle's higher pitched vocals" in the song "Yeh Mera Dil", ensuring such "fuller female timbres become more commonplace' to a decidedly more forceful and sensual sounds". Ganesh Anantharaman in his book Bollywood Melodies: A History of the Hindi Film Song wrote that Chauhan has a "good, expressive" voice but she crafted a particular image for herself as the singer of fast, racy songs.

The Times of India considered her voice as the "liveliest voice in Bollywood". According to MensXP.com, "her voice is orgasmic and extremely fierce. While singing a certain stanza, she gets into the mood so deeply, her voice breaks into a passionate squeal as she strikes a high note". In an interview, classical musician Rahul Sharma said, "Chauhan's voice has an element of sensuality which [is] also very versatile and I admire the quality of her voice and the kind of emotions she can bring out".

=== Musical style ===
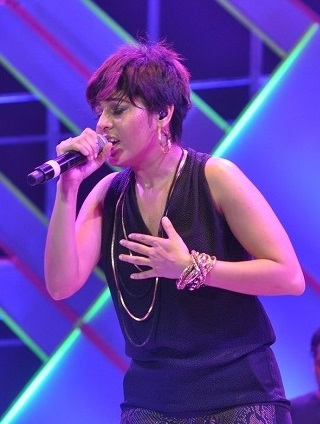
Chauhan performing at Channel V India Fest, 2014

Chauhan's music contains elements of pop, hip hop and R&B. Music composer Sandeep Chowta while talking about the singer said "She is a brilliant singer with a wide range and an individual style. She does not copy anyone. She knows what she's doing and is in total control. She's not just a singer, she's also a musician". Chauhan has said that her audience feels more comfortable in hearing her singing item songs and she made her "name because of that genre". The perception of singing only item songs was "broken" when Chauhan performed the romantic song, "Meri Zindagi Mein" for Anu Malik which was then followed by songs from Chameli and Fanaa. However, Chauhan declared that she "dislikes" tagging songs as item numbers and "they are treated specially, they have extra attention and they are picturised in a special way. So, I like being associated to any special song".

Describing her singing style, Chauhan said; "I have no particular style; instead I only go with the music and the lyrics, and feel free to express my emotions through singing". Though her singing style has a strong western influences, she has recorded some semi-classical songs in her career, including songs from Rang Rasiya. She has not performed any classical songs or a ghazal and has expressed her interest on releasing a ghazal album. Though known for her high pitch renditions, she personally prefers soft and soothing songs. Believing that singing all kinds of songs makes her grow as a musician she revealed that her "weakness remains for soft melodies". "Even on live shows, I first sing my fast numbers to get the audience into the groove. But once they are happy with their favorite numbers, I switch on to slow scores".

Chauhan's live rendition of songs is praised by the viewers for her power and energy. A newspaper published in the United Arab Emirates, The National wrote: "From flitting between fast and slow songs, to playing with the tempos and notes of the songs she sang, she didn't stick to the original format of any number".

=== Influence ===
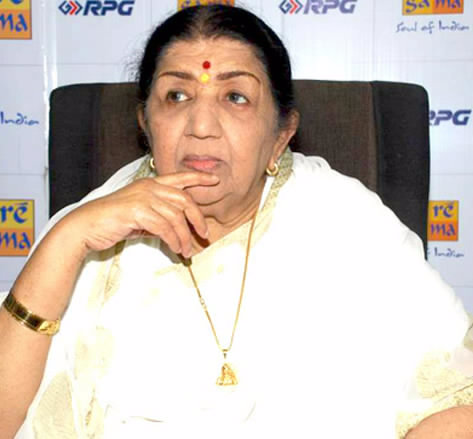
Lata Mangeshkar has significantly influenced Chauhan and her music

Chauhan was introduced to music by her father and credits her "powerful" voice to him. She acknowledges that western music had a huge impact in her singing and confessed that she likes to perform "songs that have a western flavour in them". Believing that her voice has a "global appeal", she feels that her exposure to international music has only "sharpened" her skills while she does not forcefully tries to imply a western feel to the song. She considers Lata Mangeshkar as her biggest inspiration, calling her "a temple of music". She grew up listening to music by Mangeshkar and Asha Bhosle and is equally influenced by singers like Kavita Krishnamurthy, Sadhana Sargam, K.S.Chithra, Alka Yagnik, Kishori Amonkar, Kishore Kumar and Manna Dey.

Sonu Nigam who helped her get her first break in the industry was named as one of the biggest influences in shaping her career along with her parents and she described him as a "catalyst to fuel my career". She was mainly compared with her contemporary singer Shreya Ghoshal for which Chauhan stated, "I am contented to have my own area in the current music world. Likewise, Shreya Ghoshal has her own. I personally respect Shreya for her talents and nice songs, whom people consider as a threat to me". Moreover, Chauhan's versatility is compared with Bhosle, where she described Bhosle as a "singing institution", whereas, Chauhan is like a "student to her".

Chauhan has also been influenced by many artists outside the country like Beyoncé, Michael Jackson, Mariah Carey, Celine Dion and Whitney Houston. According to Chauhan, she started listening English songs after she turned 11, and she grew up listening to "Always Be My Baby" by Carey. Chauhan who admires the work of Shakira was keen to be part of the Indian version of The Voice, since she served as a coach on the American version of the show.

== Public image ==
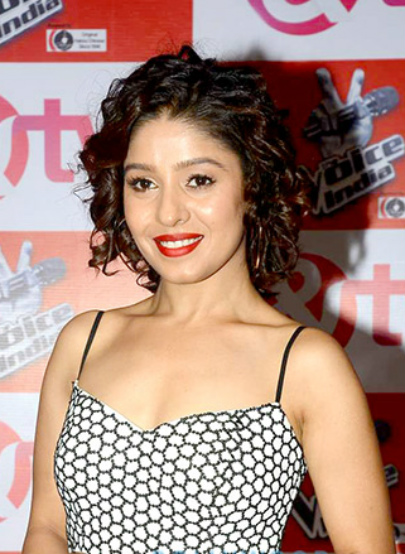
Sunidhi Chauhan at The Voice India launch in 2015

Known for experimenting with her style and image, Chauhan's music and fashion sense are noted by the media. In 2010, while she appeared a judge in the Indian Idol (Season 5), her look was discussed in the media; Rediff.com considered her wardrobe sense a "real shame" considering that she is "young", "slim" and "pretty". However, Mid-Day praised her style in the show for "dressing in normal clothes" while compared to other judges, though they mentioned that "her hairstyle changes too often for our liking". Prior to Indian Idol, Chauhan's face was not so familiar with the public and according to her, people imagined her to be a "30 to 40 years old woman in a sari", while she is "dressed casually in denims and a tee". Reportedly, during a concert in Kolkata, the local people did not recognise her when she entered the venue, until the host introduced her to them.

After Chauhan got married in 2012, she had put on weight of about 20 kg. During the time, she was getting breathless on stage and wanted to get fit, as she had to perform at concerts and regular shows. Besides, she likes "glamorous" outfits which she feels uncomfortable wearing with too much weight. She then followed a strict diet and regularly went to gym or for jogging. She knocked off 12 kg by jogging and working out. Post a hairdo in 2014, she worked on her wardrobe and chose a trendy image to "open up" to the fashion. She appeared on The Voice after the weight loss, though clarified that "losing weight was not intentional. Neither was it for The Voice India. It's just that one day I decided that I need to go to gym and eat a healthy diet".

In 2012, Chauhan appeared in the Forbes Celebrity 100, a list based on income and popularity of India's celebrities. She was listed at the seventy-second spot in 2012, fifty-eighth spot in 2013, fifty-sixth spot in 2014, sixtieth spot in 2015. In 2013, Chauhan appeared in the list of "World's Sexiest Asian Woman" by FHM India at the twenty-eighth position, and was named the "Hottest Female Bollywood Lead Singer" by MensXP.com. Chauhan was selected in the list of "Top 5 Celeb100 Singers and Musicians" compiled by Forbes India. She was also voted as Bollywood's most favourite Female Playback Singer in the "Vuclip Icons of the Year 2012" mobile survey. Apart from public appearances, Chauhan began to use social media to respond directly to her fans. She opened a Twitter account in 2010, and use a Facebook Fan page both manage by herself. She was included at the twenty-second position of the "50 Most Influential Indians on Social Media", a list created by taking account of number of followers on Facebook and Twitter.

== Impact and recognition ==
Chauhan's work has received praise from several artists. Lata Mangeshkar called her the "Numero Uno" singer of the generation, and said: "Sunidhi can sing all kinds of songs. And her voice and style have all the elements that Gen- Now hankers after." Asha Bhosle, Alka Yagnik, Kavita Krishnamurthy, and Usha Uthup picked Chauhan as one of the best female singers from the generation. Manna Dey, Amjad Ali Khan, Bombay Jayashri, Kavita Seth, and Rahat Fateh Ali Khan praised the musical abilities of Chauhan. Ghoshal, who is considered as the toughest competition to Chauhan, complimented her professionalism and said; "When we are in the studios, we chat and talk. I respect her as an artist and she does too." Alisha Chinai remarked; "Chauhan works hard on her voice and has good technique."

Naming Chauhan as her most favourite singer, Shalmali Kholgade found her musical skills "utterly" inspirational. Shaan (singer) confessing to being a massive fan of Sunidhi and said "She is just amazing" and loves to see Sunidhi singing live. Papon called her a "versatile vocalist" and complimented how she "brings life into any kind of song". British Indian rapper Hard Kaur affirmed that Chauhan as a person is as "good as her voice". Composer Shantanu Moitra perceived that Chauhan is an artist who would "excel in any time and age". Mika Singh stated that "Chauhan serves as a role model for the youngsters". Singer Shibani Kashyap remarked that Chauhan is a fabulous singer who "can sing all types of songs with the same ease". Singer Himani Kapoor considers Chauhan her Idol "because of the range she sings in". Singer Monali Thakur admitting to be a huge fan of Chauhan has said that "she has always really admired the singer". Director and Composer Vishal Bhardwaj considers Chauhan as his favourite singer that he wants to make more music for. Prakriti Kakar, Aditi Singh Sharma mentioned Chauhan as an inspiration for herself. Aastha Gill considers Chauhan her ultimate Idol and "loves the texture of her voice". Neha Bhasin credited Chauhan for bringing the "much-needed" change in the music industry.Shilpa Rao also credited Chauhan for paving the path for original, unique, and different voices and said, "You are the pioneer and many of us wouldn't be on music records if it weren't for you to change the scene". Sonu Nigam has said that the industry calls Chauhan his female version. Chauhan's work has been praised by Shefali Alvares, Ankit Tiwari, Neha Kakkar, Richa Sharma, Amit Mishra, Jonita Gandhi, Vaishali Mhade, Sukhwinder Singh, Kaushiki Chakraborty, Pawni Pandey, Shashaa Tirupati, A. R. Rahman, Amit Trivedi, and Raghav Sachar.

Chauhan also received praise from many actors including Bipasha Basu and Amrita Rao. Chauhan was named as one of the singers Priyanka Chopra looks up to. Actor-director Farhan Akhtar named Chauhan as his favourite singer and said that he "loves her voice and admires how she adapts herself to different kinds of songs. Ram Gopal Varma confessed that, he "truly sincerity honestly" thinks Chauhan is the "greatest singer in the world".

== Philanthropy ==
Besides her career in music, Chauhan has also contributed to various charities. She is associated with social causes like working for the underprivileged children, where she performed charity shows, donating money and buying clothes.

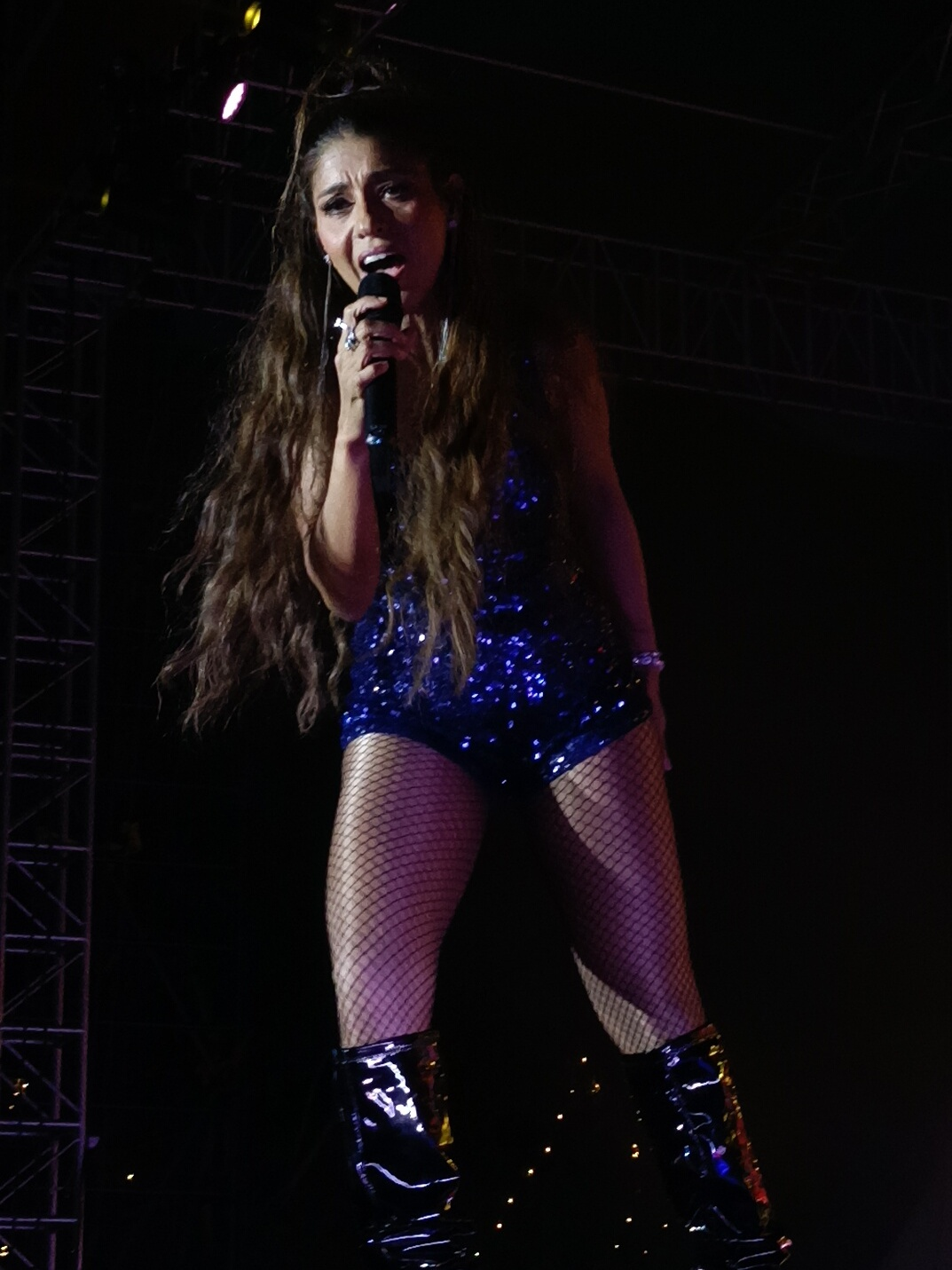
Chauhan performing live at JLN Stadium, Delhi for her I AM HOME concert tour, 2024

In 2005, along with sixteen other artists, she recorded a single titled "Zindagi Pukaarti Hai" to raise money for the victims of the 2004 Indian Ocean earthquake and tsunami. Performed at Screen Awards on 18 January 2005, the song was released as a cassette and a CD where the proceeds from sales were given to the victims. She was also involved with fundraising events for charities involved in the disaster clean-up operation. In 2006, she performed a concert held in Trafalgar Square to mark International Widows Day and start a charity to educate the children of poor widows in India. Besides, she performed in a musical show along with singers such as Suresh Wadkar and KK which helped to raise ₹15 million (US$160,000) through sponsorships and donations to open a home for senior citizens from all castes and communities. She also hosted the global campaign, "World of Betters" in Mumbai which was launched by Alicia Keys. She has also assisted in raising funds for the "Save Our Tigers" campaign, initiated by Amitabh Bachchan.

In October 2014, Chauhan was featured in a musical concert to raise awareness and funds for eye donations. During the following month, she also performed in Yuvraj Singh's social initiative YouWeCan, which aims to fight cancer by spreading awareness about the disease. Chauhan also lent her voice for a music video of John Lennon's "Imagine". The video was created as part of a global campaign by UNICEF to celebrate the 25th anniversary of the Convention on the Rights of the Child. In September 2015, Chauhan represented India at the 2015 Global Citizen Festival, an annual music festival created to mark the establishment of the United Nations Sustainable Development Goals (SDGs), a "to-do list" of 17 tasks to end extreme global poverty by 2030. It was followed by a fundraiser concert featuring Chauhan which was dedicated in raising funds to promote breast and ovarian cancer research and awareness. In October 2017, Chauhan participated in a campaign to promote breast cancer awareness.

== Personal life ==
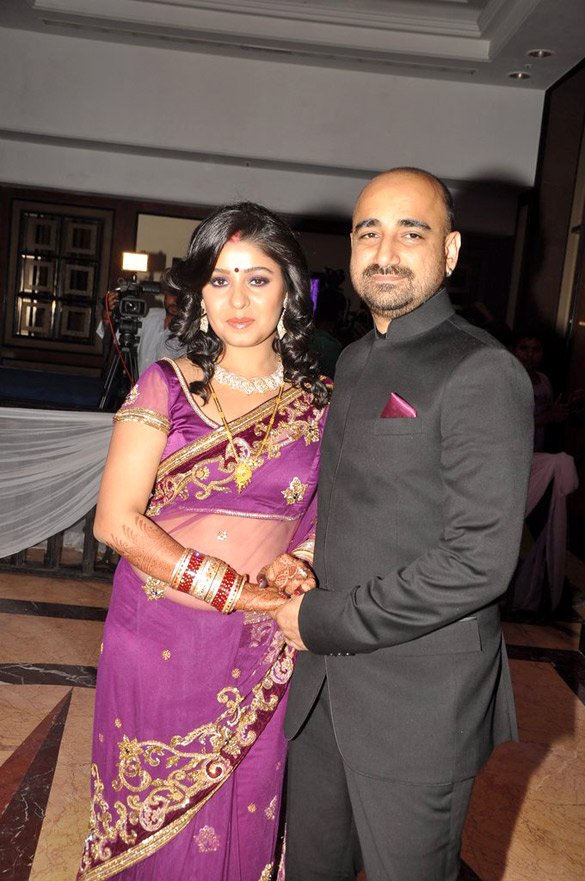
Chauhan with husband Hitesh Sonik at their wedding reception

In 2002, at the age of 18, Chauhan married director and choreographer Bobby Khan (brother of choreographer and director Ahmed Khan) after working on the music video, Pehla Nasha. It was reported that the couple married in a secretly arranged ceremony, attended only by very close friends. However, the marriage caused a rift between Sunidhi and her parents, who considered the union "unsuitable" and consequently disowned her. Despite that, she and Khan separated a year later, bringing about a reconciliation with her parents. She lived with actor Annu Kapoor and his wife Arunita during the separation, filed for divorce the same year, citing that she had realised that they "wanted different things from life".

Later, Chauhan began a romantic relationship with the music composer Hitesh Sonik whom she was friends with, since the days she won Meri Awaz Suno. After dating for more than two years, they married on 24 April 2012, at a low profile wedding ceremony in Goa and had a grand reception in Mumbai, attended by many prominent Bollywood celebrities. On 1 January 2018, Chauhan gave birth to a boy whom she named Tegh.

== Awards and achievements ==
Throughout her career, Chauhan has several honours and awards, including three Filmfare Awards: two for "Best Female Playback" and one RD Burman Award for New Music Talent.

She has also performed quite often in college festivals, including Thomso IIT Roorkee 2024, Rendezvous IIT Delhi fest 2022 and KIIT Silver Jubilee Karnival 2023 to name a few.

== Filmography ==
=== Film ===
Year	Title	Role	Notes	Ref.
2001	Ehsaas: The Feeling	Herself	Cameo appearance	
2003	Bhoot	Herself	Special appearance in the promotional song "Bhoot Hoon Main"	
2004	Uuf Kya Jaadoo Mohabbat Hai	Herself	Special appearance in the promotional song "Uuf Kya Jaadoo Mohabbat Hai"	
2006	Bas Ek Pal	Herself	Special appearance in the promotional song "Dheeme Dheeme"	
2012	Sons of Ram	Sita	Voice	
2014	Hawaa Hawaai	Herself	Special appearance in the promotional song "Ghoom Gayi"	
2014	Khoobsurat	Herself	Special appearance in the promotional song "Baal Khade"	
2016	Playing Priya	Priya	Short film	
2016	Rock On 2	Herself	Special appearance as reality show judge	

=== Television ===
Year	Title	Role	Ref.
1996	Meri Awaz Suno	Contestant	
2000	Mini Super Star	Guest Judge	
2010	Indian Idol 5	Judge	
2012	Indian Idol 6	Judge	
2015	The Voice	Coach	
2018	The Remix	Judge	
2018	Dil Hai Hindustani Season 2	Judge	
2024	MTV Hustle	Guest judge	

== See also ==
- List of Indian playback singers
