= List of awards and nominations received by Sunidhi Chauhan =

Sunidhi Chauhan awards and nominations
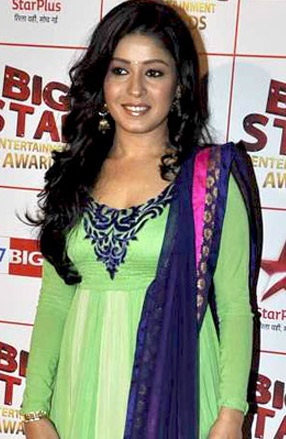
- Chauhan at Big Star Entertainment Awards, 2010
Awards and nominations
Award	Wins	Nominations
Filmfare Awards	3	17
Filmfare Awards South	1	4
Filmfare Awards Punjabi	0	2
IIFA	2	15
Screen Awards	2	10
Zee Cine	1	3
Mirchi Music	1	4

Totals (Note: Certain award groups do not simply award one winner. They acknowledge several different recipients, have runners-up, and have third place. Since this is a specific recognition and is different from losing an award, runner-up mentions are considered wins in this award tally. For simplification and to avoid errors, each award in this list has been presumed to have had a prior nomination.)
- Wins: 22
- Nominations: 85

Sunidhi Chauhan is an Indian singer. Chauhan made her career debut at the age of 13, with the film Shastra. She rose to prominence after recording "Ruki Ruki Si Zindagi" from Mast (1999), ultimately winning the Filmfare RD Burman Award for New Music Talent and was nominated as the Best Female Playback Singer. Her second breakthrough was released in 2000, with the song "Mehboob Mere" which resulted in receiving another Filmfare nomination. Chauhan received her third Filmfare nomination with the energetic "Dhoom Machale" (2004) followed by two more nominations during the next year for "Kaisi Paheli" and "Deedar De".

2006 was one of the most successful years in her career, where she was bestowed with her first Filmfare award for her rendition of the song "Beedi" and further two nominations for "Soniye" and "Aashiqui Main". The following year, she was prominently recognized for the title song of Aaja Nachle (2007) and "Sajnaaji Vaari". Chauhan received her 12th Filmfare nomination with "Chor Bazaari" (2009) preceded by "Dance Pe Chance" (2008). In 2010, she received her second Filmfare award with the item song "Sheila Ki Jawani" and was nominated for international styled carnival song "Udi" (2010).

== Annual Central European Bollywood Awards ==
The Annual Central European Bollywood Awards are fan awards with the voters mostly from Germany, Austria and Switzerland. They are users of the Bollywood Forum belonging to the film website, organizer of the ACEBAs. Chauhan has received an award from two nominations.

Year	Film	Nominated Song	Result	Ref.
2007	Fanaa	"Mere Haath Mein"	Won	
2008	Honeymoon Travels Pvt. Ltd.	"Sajnaaji Vaari Vaari"	Nominated	

== BIG Star Entertainment Awards ==
The BIG Star Entertainment Awards are presented annually by Reliance Broadcast Network Limited in association with Star India to honour personalities from the field of entertainment across movies, music, television, sports, theater and dance. Chauhan has received an award from six nominations.

Year	Film	Nominated Song	Result	Ref.
2010	Tees Maar Khan	"Sheila Ki Jawani"	Won	
2011	Murder 2	"Aa Zara"	Nominated	
2012	Ishaqzaade	"Chokra Jawaan"	Nominated	
2012	Heroine	"Halkat Jawani"	Nominated	
2013	Yeh Jawaani Hai Deewani	"Dilliwaali Girlfriend"	Nominated	
2014	Dhoom 3	"Kamli"	Nominated	

== Bhaskar Bollywood Awards ==
The Bhaskar Bollywood Awards are presented by Dainik Bhaskar for excellence in the Hindi film industry. Chauhan has received one nomination.

Year	Film	Nominated Song	Result	Ref.
2012	Murder 2	"Aa Zara"	Nominated	

== Filmfare Awards ==
The Filmfare Awards are one of the oldest and most prestigious Hindi film awards. They are presented annually by The Times Group for excellence of cinematic achievements. Chauhan received two awards from seventeen nominations.

Other than awards for Best Female Playback Singer, Chauhan received the Filmfare RD Burman Award for New Music Talent in 2001.

Year	Film	Nominated Song	Result	Ref.
2000	Mast	"Ruki Ruki"	Nominated	
2001	Fiza	"Mehboob Mere"	Nominated	
2005	Dhoom	"Dhoom Machale"	Nominated	
2006	Parineeta	"Kaisi Paheli"	Nominated	
2006	Dus	"Deedar De"	Nominated	
2007	Omkara	"Beedi Jalaile"	Won	
2007	Aksar	"Soniye"	Nominated	
2007	36 China Town	"Aashiqui Main"	Nominated	
2008	Aaja Nachle	"Aaja Nachle"	Nominated	
2008	Honeymoon Travels Pvt. Ltd.	"Sajnaji Vari Vari"	Nominated	
2009	Rab Ne Bana Di Jodi	"Dance Pe Chance"	Nominated	
2010	Love Aaj Kal	"Chor Bazari"	Nominated	
2011	Tees Maar Khan	"Sheila Ki Jawani"	Won (Note: Tied with Mamta Sharma for "Munni Badnaam Hui" from Dabangg)	
2011	Guzaarish	"Udi"	Nominated	
2019	Raazi	"Ae Watan (Female)"	Nominated	
2019	October	"Manwaa"	Nominated	
2021	Shakuntala Devi	"Paas Nahi Toh Fail"	Nominated	

== Filmfare Awards South ==
The Filmfare Awards South are presented by Filmfare Awards for the Tamil Telugu Kannada and Malayalam film industries. The awards were inaugurated in 1956 and include categories decided by an industry jury. These are considered to be the oscars of south India. she was nominated twice each for telugu and Kannada films, winning one for the latter.

Year	Film	Nominated Song	Result
2010	Oy!	"Saradaaga"	Nominated
2010	Haage Summane	"Rock Me Baby"	Nominated
2013	Yeto Vellipoyindhi Manasu	"Atu Itu"	Nominated
2023	Vikranth Rona	"Ra Ra Rakkamma"	Won

== Global Indian Film Awards ==
The Global Indian Film Awards was an awards ceremony for the Hindi film industry held in 2005 and 2007. Chauhan received an award from two nominations.

Year	Film	Nominated Song	Result	Ref.
2005	Dhoom	"Dhoom Machaale"	Won	
2007	Omkara	"Beedi Jalaile"	Nominated	

== Global Indian Music Academy Awards ==
The Global Indian Music Academy Awards are presented annually by Global Indian Music Academy to honour and recognise Indian music. Chauhan has received an award from seven nominations.

Year	Category	Film/Album	Nominated Song	Result	Ref.
2011	Best Female Playback Singer	Tees Maar Khan	"Sheila Ki Jawani"	Won	
2011	Best Female Playback Singer	Band Baaja Baaraat	"Ainvayi Ainvayi"	Nominated	
2011	Best Female Playback Singer	Guzaarish	"Udi"	Nominated	
2012	Best Female Playback Singer	Agneepath	"Gun Gun Guna"	Nominated	
2014	Best Female Playback Singer	Dhoom 3	"Kamli"	Nominated	
2015	Best Female Playback Singer	Highway	"Tu Kuja"	Nominated	
2015	Best Duet	Daawat-e-Ishq	"Daawat-e-Ishq" (along with Javed Ali)	Nominated	

== Indian Telly Awards ==
The Indian Telly Awards is an annual award for excellence both on-screen and behind-the-scenes of television in India. Chauhan has received one nomination.

Year	Category	Nominated work	Result	Ref.
2015	Best Judge Panel	The Voice (along with Himesh Reshammiya, Shaan, Mika Singh)	Nominated	

== International Indian Film Academy Awards ==
The International Indian Film Academy Awards are presented annually by the International Indian Film Academy to honour excellence of cinematic achievements in the Hindi language film industry. Chauhan has received two awards from fourteen nominations.

Year	Film	Nominated Song	Result	Ref.
2001	Fiza	"Mehboob Mere"	Nominated	
2004	Munna Bhai M.B.B.S.	"Dekhle Aankhon Mein Aankhien Daal"	Nominated	
2005	Dhoom	"Dhoom Machale"	Won	
2005	Chameli	"Sajna Ve"	Nominated	
2006	Parineeta	"Kaisi Paheli"	Nominated	
2006	Dus	"Deedar De"	Nominated	
2007	Dhoom 2	"Crazy Kiya Re"	Nominated	
2007	Omkara	"Beedi Jalaile"	Won	
2008	Aaja Nachle	"Aaja Nachle"	Nominated	
2009	Dostana	"Desi Girl"	Nominated	
2010	Love Aaj Kal	"Chor Baazari"	Nominated	
2011	Tees Maar Khan	"Sheila Ki Jawani"	Nominated	
2011	Band Baaja Baaraat	"Ainvayi Ainvayi"	Nominated	
2012	Dum Maaro Dum	"Te Amo"	Nominated	
2016	Dil Dhadakne Do	"Girls Like To Swing"	Nominated	
2019	Sanju	"Main Badhiya Tu Bhi Badhiya"	Nominated	
2019	Raazi	"Ae Watan (Female)"	Nominated	

== Mirchi Music Awards ==
The Mirchi Music Awards are presented annually by Radio Mirchi to honour both artistic and technical excellence of professionals in the Hindi language film music industry of India. Chauhan has received an award from four nominations.

Year	Film	Nominated Song	Result	Ref.
2010	Tees Maar Khan	"Sheila Ki Jawani"	Nominated	
2010	Guzaarish	"Udi"	Nominated	
2011	The Dirty Picture	"Ishq Sufiyana"	Won	
2012	Agneepath	"Gun Gun Guna"	Nominated	

== Screen Awards ==
India's only accolade involved with the Executive Director and the Governor of the Academy of Motion Picture Arts and Sciences, The Screen Awards honour excellence of cinematic achievements in the Hindi language film industry. Chauhan has won two award from ten nominations.

Year	Film	Nominated Song	Result	Ref.
2000	Mast	"Ruki Ruki"	Nominated	
2001	Mission Kashmir	"Bumbro"	Nominated	
2004	Armaan	"Meri Zindagi Mein Aaye Ho"	Nominated	
2005	Chameli	"Sajna Ve Sajna"	Won	
2005	Dhoom	"Dhoom Machale"	Nominated	
2006	Parineeta	"Kaisi Paheli"	Nominated	
2007	Omkara	"Beedi Jalaile"	Won	
2008	Honeymoon Travels Pvt. Ltd.	"Sajnaji Vaari"	Nominated	
2009	Rab Ne Bana Di Jodi	"Dance Pe Chance"	Nominated	
2010	Love Aaj Kal	"Chor Bazari"	Nominated	
2011	Tees Maar Khan	"Sheila Ki Jawani"	Nominated	

== Star Guild Awards ==
The Star Guild Awards are presented by the Apsara Producers Guild to honour and recognise the professional excellence of their peers. Chauhan has received an award from nine nominations.

Year	Film	Nominated Song	Result	Ref.
2004	Chameli	"Bhaage Re Mann"	Nominated	
2006	Dhoom	"Dhoom Machaale"	Nominated	
2008	Aaja Nachle	"Aaja Nachle"	Nominated	
2008	Honeymoon Travels Pvt. Ltd.	"Sajna Vaari"	Nominated	
2010	Love Aaj Kal	"Chor Bazari"	Nominated	
2011	Band Baaja Baaraat	"Ainvayi Ainvayi"	Nominated	
2011	Tees Maar Khan	"Sheila Ki Jawani"	Won	
2012	Dum Maaro Dum	"Te Amo"	Nominated	
2012	Murder 2	"Aa Zara"	Nominated	
2015	Dil Dhadakne Do	"Girls Like To Swing"	Nominated	

== Zee Cine Awards ==
The Zee Cine Awards are presented by Zee Network for the Hindi film industry. The awards were inaugurated in 1998 and include categories decided by public votes and an industry jury. The awards were not presented in 2009 and 2010, but were resumed from 2011. Chauhan has received an award from three nominations.

Year	Film	Nominated Song	Result	Ref.
2005	Dhoom	"Dhoom Machale"	Won	
2005	Parineeta	"Kaisi Paheli"	Nominated	
2007	Omkara	"Beedi Jalaile"	Nominated	

== Vijay Awards ==
The Vijay Awards are presented by Vijay TV for the Tamil film industry. The awards were inaugurated in 2006 and include categories decided by public votes and an industry jury.

Year	Film	Nominated Song	Result
2012	Neethaane En Ponvasantham	"Mudhal Murai"	Nominated

== SIIMA Awards ==
Year	Film	Nominated Song	Result	Ref.
2012	Badrinath	"Nath Nath"	Nominated	
2021	Sye Raa Narasimha Reddy	"Sye Raa Title Song"	Nominated	
2022	Vikrant Rona	"Ra Ra Rakkamma"	Won	

== Other awards and honours ==
Year	Category	Song and Film	Result
Tarang Housefull Awards
2013	Best Playback Singer – Female	"Dil Dharke Main Tum Se" for Anjuman	Won
2013	Best Playback Singer – Female	"Aap Dil Ki Anjuman Mein" for Anjuman	Nominated
Stardust Awards
2014	Best Playback Singer – Female	"Kamli" for Dhoom 3	Nominated
PTC Punjabi Film Awards
2013	Best Playback Singer – Female	"Mera Dil Tera Hoya" for Mirza - The Untold Story	Nominated
2013	Best Playback Singer – Female	"Patang Wali Dor Sirphire" for Sirphire	Won
2015	Best Playback Singer – Female	Ehsaas Da Rishta" for Kirpaan: The Sword of Honour	Nominated
2015	Best Playback Singer – Female	"Laatu" for Disco Singh	Nominated
2015	Best Playback Singer – Female	"Chandi Di Dabbi" for Jatt James Bond	Won

- 2004: MTV Immies for Best Singer Female (Film) – "Dekh Le" (Munna Bhai M.B.B.S.)
- 2009: Kelvinator GR8! FLO Women Award
- 2009: Indian Television Academy–GR8! Women Achiever Awards – GR8! Women Achiever in Music – Sunidhi Chauhan
- 2010: Big Star Indian Music Award for Best Visualized Song Track (Female) – "Udi" – Aishwarya Rai Bachchan & Sunidhi Chauhan
- 2011: Massal Award for Best International Female Vocalist Award – Sunidhi Chauhan
