= Versatile =

Versatile may refer to:

== Entertainment ==
- Versatile (producer), real name of Andrew Roettger, American record producer, songwriter and remixer
- The Versatiles, a Jamaican reggae group
- Versatile (Van Morrison album), 2017
- Versatile (Pop Evil album), 2021
- "Versatile", a song by Claude Bolling from Suite for Flute and Jazz Piano Trio 1973
- "Versatile", a song by Pansy Division from Undressed (Pansy Division album), 1993
- "Versatile", a song by Jermaine Stewart from Frantic Romantic, 1986
- "Versatile", a song by Baba Dee from The Headies 2007
- "Versatile", a song by Kodak Black from Project Baby 2, 2017

== Other ==
- HMS Versatile (D32), a Royal Navy destroyer that saw service in both world wars
- Versatile (company), Canadian manufacturing company and brand of agricultural equipment by the company
- Versatile (sex), person who enjoys both being a top and a bottom, and may alternate between the two in sexual situations
- In botany, refers to anthers that swing freely at their attachment to the filament

== See also ==
- Versatile Multilayer Disc aka VMD or HD VMD, a high-capacity red laser optical disc technology
