= Khatron Ke Khiladi 15 =

Indian reality and stunt television series

Fear Factor: Khatron Ke Khiladi, Darr Ka Naya Daur
- Season 15
- Starring: See below
- Presented by: Rohit Shetty
- No. of contestants: 13
- Winner: Avinash Mishra
- Runner-up: Rithvik Dhanjani
- Location: Cape Town, South Africa
- Production companies: Endemol Shine India; Banijay Asia
- No. of episodes: 20

Release
- Original network: Colors TV
- Original release: 1 August – 4 October 2026

Additional information
- Filming dates: May 21 – June 21, 2026

Season chronology
- ← Previous; Season 14

Fear Factor: Khatron Ke Khiladi, Darr Ka Naya Daur (transl. Fear Factor: Players of Danger, A New Era of Fear) is the fifteenth season of Fear Factor: Khatron Ke Khiladi, an Indian reality television and stunt television series. Produced by Endemol Shine India in association with Banijay Asia, the season was filmed in Cape Town, South Africa, and is hosted by Rohit Shetty. It premiered from 1 August to 4 October 2026 on Colors TV and streams digitally on JioHotstar. Avinash Mishra emerged as the winner of the season while Rithvik Dhanjani became the 1st runner-up.

The series was announced in May 2026, with principal photography commencing later that month and concluding in June 2026.

== Contestants ==
Contestant	Occupation	Status	Place	Previous KKK Status		Ref.
Contestant	Occupation	Status	Place	Season	Status	Ref.
Avinash Mishra	Actor	Winner	1st			
Rithvik Dhanjani	Actor	1st runner-up	2nd	Season 8	Eliminated (7th Place)	
Rithvik Dhanjani	Actor	1st runner-up	2nd	Made in India	Quit; Walked (9th Place)	
Orhan "Orry" Awatramani	Internet personality	2nd runner-up	3rd			
Farrhana Bhatt	Actress	Finalist (Top 5)	4th			
Karan Wahi	Actor	Finalist (Top 5)	5th	Season 8	Eliminated (8th Place)	
Karan Wahi	Actor	Finalist (Top 5)	5th	Made in India	1st runner-up	
Harsh Gujral	Stand-up Comedian	Finalist (Top 7)	6th			
Rubina Dilaik	Actress	Finalist (Top 7)	7th	Season 12	Finalist (5th Place)	
Ruhanika Dhawan	Actress	Eliminated	8th			
Jasmin Bhasin	Actress	Quit; Walked	9th	Season 9	Eliminated (7th Place)	
Jasmin Bhasin	Actress	Eliminated	9th	Made in India	2nd runner-up	
Gaurav Khanna	Actor	Quit; Injury	10th			
Gaurav Khanna	Actor	Quit; Walked	10th			
Vishal Aditya Singh	Actor	Eliminated	11th	Season 11	2nd runner-up	
Vishal Aditya Singh	Actor	Quit; Injury	11th	Season 11	2nd runner-up	
Shagun Sharma	Actress	Eliminated	12th			
Avika Gor	Actress	Eliminated	13th	Season 9	Eliminated (12th Place)	

Indicates original entrants
Indicates re-entered entrants

== Elimination chart ==
Contestant	Weeks																																																											
Contestant	Team Phase																																	Individual Phase																										
Contestant	1								2								3^{1}								4									5				6				7			8			9								10				
Contestant	New Batch v/s Old Batch								Psychological Khatra								Achanak Bhayanak Khatra								Countdown Khatra									Filmy Blockbuster Khatra				Khiladi v/s Khiladi				Viral Khatra			Revenge Mode			Semi-Finale								Grand Finale				
Contestant	1-2 August								8-9 August								15-16 August								22-23 August									29-30 August				5-6 September				12-13 September			19-20 September			26-27 September								3 October		4 October		
Avinash		W			TIE	SAFE			L			W	TIE	SAFE				L	L	L	Old Batch Won	BTM4	SAFE			13:00 min				Old Batch Won (+01:40 min lead)	BTM4	SAFE		WIN				WIN	WIN		WIN^{7}	WIN			WIN			W				Team Avinash Won (2-0 lead)	SAFE		WIN	FINALIST		WIN	WIN	WINNER
Rithvik		W			TIE	SAFE			W			L	TIE	SAFE				W	W		Old Batch Won	SAFE				15:00 min				Old Batch Won (+01:40 min lead)	SAFE			WIN				WIN	WIN	WIN	FAIL	WIN			LOST	SAFE		L				Team Avinash Won (2-0 lead)	SAFE		TEAM LOST	WIN		WIN	FAIL	1st RUNNER-UP
Orry				L	TIE	SAFE				W			TIE	SAFE			L		L		Old Batch Won	BTM4	BTM2	SAFE	09:11 min			2:55 min		Old Batch Won (+01:40 min lead)	SAFE			LOST	SAFE^{3}			WIN	FAIL			LOST	SAFE		WIN					W		Team Avinash Won (2-0 lead)	SAVED BY CAPTAIN		TEAM LOST	BTM3	SAFE	WIN	FAIL	2nd RUNNER-UP
Farrhana	L				TIE	SAFE				W			TIE	SAFE				W	W		Old Batch Won	SAFE			07:58 min			05:28 min	10:38 min	Old Batch Won (+01:40 min lead)	SAFE			LOST	WIN			WIN	WIN	FAIL		LOST	SAFE		WIN				L		W	Team Avinash Won (2-0 lead)	SAFE			WIN		FAIL	ELIMINATED	
Karan		L			TIE	BTM4	SAFE		W				TIE	SAFE				W	W		Old Batch Won	SAFE			07:58 min					Old Batch Won (+01:40 min lead)	SAFE			WIN				WIN	WIN		FAIL	WIN			LOST	BTM3	JACKET^{8}		W			Team Avinash Won (2-0 lead)	SAFE		FAIL	WIN		FAIL	ELIMINATED	
Harsh			W		TIE	SAFE			L				TIE	BTM4	SAFE			W	W	L	Old Batch Won	SAFE							10:38 min	Old Batch Won (+01:40 min lead)	SAFE			LOST	LOST	BTM2	SAFE	FAIL				WIN			WIN					W		Team Avinash Won (2-0 lead)	SAFE			BTM3	ELIMINATED			
Rubina	W			W	TIE	SAFE				L			TIE	BTM4	BTM3	SAFE	W				Old Batch Won	SAFE			09:11 min				15:38 min	Old Batch Won (+01:40 min lead)	BTM4	BTM3	SAFE	WIN				FAIL	FAIL^{6}			LOST	BTM3	SAFE	LOST	SAFE			W			Team Avinash Won (2-0 lead)	BTM2	SAFE	TEAM LOST	BTM3	ELIMINATED			
Ruhanika		W			TIE	SAFE			L				TIE	BTM4	BTM3	SAFE		L	L		Old Batch Won	SAFE				15:00 min				Old Batch Won (+01:40 min lead)	SAFE			LOST	WIN			FAIL				LOST	BTM3	SAFE	LOST	BTM3	SAFE		L		L	Team Avinash Won (2-0 lead)	BTM2	ELIMINATED						
Jasmin		L			TIE	SAFE			W		W		TIE	SAFE							Old Batch Won	SAFE					-5:00 min	05:28 min		Old Batch Won (+01:40 min lead)	SAFE			LOST	LOST	QUIT; WALKED^{4}	SAFE	WIN	HEALTH HALT			LOST	SAFE		LOST	BTM3	ELIMINATED													
Gaurav	L				TIE	BTM4	BTM2	SAFE			L	W	TIE	SAFE				L	L	W	Old Batch Won	SAFE							15:38 min	Old Batch Won (+01:40 min lead)	BTM4	BTM3	QUIT; INJURY					FAIL				LOST	BTM3	QUIT; WALKED																
Vishal			L		TIE	BTM4	SAFE			L		L	TIE	BTM4	BTM3	ELIMINATED				W	Old Batch Won	SAFE				13:00 min				Old Batch Won (+01:40 min lead)	SAFE			LOST	LOST	SAFE^{5}		QUIT; INJURY																						
Shagun		L			TIE	BTM4	BTM2	SAFE	L				TIE	SAFE							Old Batch Won	BTM4	SAFE^{2}				-5:00 min	2:55 min		Old Batch Won (+01:40 min lead)	BTM4	BTM3	SAFE	LOST	LOST	BTM2	ELIMINATED																							
Avika	W				TIE	SAFE			W				TIE	SAFE				L	L		Old Batch Won	BTM4	BTM2	ELIMINATED																																				

1. The teams shuffled per ‘Achanak Bhayanak Khatra‘.
2. Vishal proxies Shagun due to injury.
3. Orry was saved by safe contestants.
4. Jasmine quit the show before the Pain Auction but later re-entered.
5. Avinash proxies Vishal due to injury.
6. Jasmine quits ‘Swift Shield Jacket’ Race and swaps herself with Rubina.
7. Avinash won the ‘Swift Shield Jacket’ that grants him immunity from performing any one stunt for up to two weeks.
8. As Avinash was safe, he received opportunity to use the ‘Swift Shield Jacket’ on a contestant he wants to save from elimination stunt. He chooses Karan.

Winner
1st runner-up
2nd runner-up
Finalists
The contestant won the stunt.
The contestant lost the stunt / in losing team and received Fear Funda.
The contestant got rid of Fear Funda by winning pain auction / pre-elimination stunt.
The contestant lost in pain auction / pre-elimination stunt and performed elimination stunt.
The contestant was safe from elimination by winning elimination stunt.
The contestant was eliminated.
The contestant was exempted from performing stunt.
Injury

== Stunt matrix ==
Contestant	Weeks																																								
Contestant	1				2				3					4					5				6				7			8			9				10				
Contestant	Team Phase																		Individual Phase																						
Contestant	New Batch v/s Old Batch				Psychological Khatra				Achanak Bhayanak Khatra					Countdown Khatra					Filmy Blockbuster Khatra				Khiladi v/s Khiladi				Viral Khatra			Revenge Mode			Semi-Finale				Grand Finale				
Contestant	1–2 August				8–9 August				15–16 August					22–23 August					29–30 August				5–6 September				12–13 September			19–20 September			26–27 September				3 October		4 October		
Contestant	Immunity		Pain Auction	Elimination	Immunity		Pain Auction	Elimination	Immunity			Pain Auction	Elimination	Immunity			Pain Auction	Elimination	Immunity	Pre-Pain Auction	Pain Auction	Elimination	Swift Shield Jacket				Immunity	Pre-Elimination	Elimination	Immunity	Pre-Elimination	Elimination	Immunity		Elimination	Top 5	Top 5	Elimination	Top 3	WIN	
Avinash	Vacuum				Swing; Water	Vehicle			Vehicle	Electric Current	Height	Tear Gas		Water; Puzzle			Water		Water				Vehicle	Height		Water	Water			Height			Vehicle			Water			Height	Vehicle; Water; Height	WINNER
Rithvik	Vacuum				Swing; Water	Vehicle			Vehicle	Electric Current				Water; Puzzle					Height				Animal	Height	Animal	Water	Animal; Electric Current			Height	Vehicle; Water		Vehicle				Height; Electric Current		Vehicle; Height	Vehicle; Water; Height	1st RUNNER-UP
Orry	Animal				Height				Canon		Electric Current	Tear Gas	Animal; Dark	Height	Animal; Puzzle				Water				Electric Current	Height			Water	Animal		Water			Ice				Water	Height; Water	Height	Vehicle; Water; Height	2nd RUNNER-UP
Farrhana	Helicopter; Water				Height				Vehicle	Electric Current				Height	Animal; Puzzle	Animal; Obstacle			Animal	Water			Vehicle	Height	Animal		Water	Water		Height			Animal	Animal			Height; Electric Current		Height		
Karan	Vacuum		Pellet Gun		Swing; Water				Vehicle	Electric Current				Height					Animal				Electric Current	Height		Water	Water			Height	Vehicle; Water^{14}		Animal			Water	Water		Vehicle; Height		
Harsh	Cricket				Swing; Water		Candle Wax		Vehicle	Height	Electric Current			Animal; Obstacle					Height	Water	Electric Current	Vehicle	Vehicle				Animal; Electric Current			Electric Current			Ice				Height; Electric Current	Height; Water			
Rubina	Helicopter; Water	Animal			Height		Candle Wax	Animal	Cannon					Height	Animal; Obstacle		Water	Height	Animal				Electric Current	Height^{13}			Water	Animal	Height	Water	Height		Animal		Vehicle		Height; Electric Current	Height; Water			
Ruhanika	Vacuum				Swing; Water		Candle Wax	Animal	Vehicle	Electric Current				Water; Puzzle					Animal	Water			Animal				Water	Water	Height	Water	Height	Animal	Animal	Animal	Vehicle						
Jasmin	Vacuum				Swing; Water	Aerobatic; Aircraft			Cannon					Animal; Puzzle					Height	Water		Vehicle	Animal				Animal; Electric Current	Animal		Electric Current	Height	Animal									
Gaurav	Helicopter; Water		Pellet Gun	Height	Aerobatic; Aircraft	Vehicle			Vehicle	Height	Electric Current			Animal; Obstacle			Water	Height					Vehicle				Animal; Electric Current	Animal	Height												
Vishal	Cricket		Pellet Gun		Height	Vehicle	Candle Wax	Animal			Height			Water; Puzzle					Water	Water	Electric Current^{12}																				
Shagun	Vacuum		Pellet Gun	Height	Swing; Water				Cannon			Tear Gas^{11}		Animal; Puzzle			Water	Height	Height	Water	Electric Current	Vehicle																			
Avika	Helicopter; Water				Swing; Water				Vehicle	Electric Current		Tear Gas	Animal; Dark																												

1. Vishal proxies Shagun due to injury.
2. Avinash proxies Vishal due to injury.
3. Jasmine quits ‘Swift Shield Jacket’ Race and swaps herself with Rubina.
4. Avinash used 'Swift Shield Jacket' to save Karan from performing elimination stunt.

== Production ==
=== Casting ===
In May 2026, Colors TV confirmed the list of contestants through its official social media platforms. Later that month, Ruhanika Dhawan confirmed her participation in the series.

=== Development ===
The series was officially announced by Colors TV with a press conference held on 9 May 2026. The contestants departed from Mumbai Airport for Cape Town, South Africa, on 16 May 2026 to commence filming. Host Rohit Shetty departed for South Africa three days later, on 19 May 2026.

Following the completion of filming, the contestants returned to Mumbai from Cape Town on 22 June 2026.

=== Filming ===
Principal photography commenced on 21 May 2026 in Cape Town, South Africa, and concluded on 21 June 2026. The season was filmed entirely in Cape Town over a 40-day schedule.

The contestants reunited for the grand finale episode shoot, held on 13 September 2026 in Mumbai.

== Release ==
On 30 May 2026, the first teaser, featuring Rohit Shetty unveiling the season's logo and sponsors, was released on Colors TV's official YouTube channel. A second teaser was released in June 2026, confirming a July premiere. On 28 July 2026, a promotional video featuring cricketer Morné Morkel, who appeared as a guest challenger in a stunt, was released.

The season was originally scheduled to premiere on 25 July 2026, but was postponed to 1 August 2026 due to the TRP blackout. Ahead of its premiere, the contestants promoted the series on the semi-final episode of Laughter Chefs. The series premiered on Colors TV on 1 August 2026 and airs every weekend at 21:00 (IST).

== Music ==
The series' title track, "Darr Ka Naya Daur", was released on 3 June 2026.

Track listing
No.	Title	Length
1.	"Darr Ka Naya Daur"	1:03

== Reception ==
The premiere of Khatron Ke Khiladi 15 received attention for its stunt sequences and format. The Indian Express described the season’s opening as a promising start, highlighting the more demanding stunts and contestants confronting their individual fears.

The season's stunts attracted criticism from viewers. The stunt involving pellet-gun drew backlash after contestants were repeatedly struck with rubber pellets at close range. In another episode, a hot wax stunt also drew criticism, with viewers describing the task as unnecessarily painful and difficult to watch. The season also raised concerns over injuries suffered by contestants during the physically demanding stunts.
