= Jasmin Bhasin =

Indian actress and model (born 1990)

- Bhasin in 2022
- Born: 28 June 1990 (age 36); Kota, Rajasthan, India
- Occupation: Actress
- Years active: 2011–present
- Known for: Tashan-e-Ishq; Dil Se Dil Tak; Fear Factor India Khatron Ke Khiladi 9; Fear Factor: Khatron Ke Khiladi – Made in India; Bigg Boss 14

Jasmin Bhasin (born 28 June 1990) is an Indian actress who primarily works in Hindi television along with Punjabi films. She is best known for playing Twinkle Taneja in Zee TV's romance comedy drama Tashan-e-Ishq (2015–16) and Teni Bhanushali in Colors TV's romance drama series Dil Se Dil Tak (2017–18). Bhasin is also known for her participation in reality shows like Fear Factor India - Khatron Ke Khiladi 9, Fear Factor: Khatron Ke Khiladi – Made in India, 𝘍𝘦𝘢𝘳 𝘍𝘢𝘤𝘵𝘰𝘳- 𝘒𝘩𝘢𝘵𝘳𝘰𝘯 𝘒𝘦 𝘒𝘩𝘪𝘭𝘢𝘥𝘪 15, Bigg Boss Season 14 and The Traitors India

She made her acting debut in 2011 with Tamil film Vaanam. Her other notable works include portraying as Happy Saluja in Star Plus's Dil Toh Happy Hai Ji and Nayantara in Colors TV's supernatural fantasy series Naagin 4: Bhagya Ka Zehreela Khel. Bhasin made her Punjabi film debut with Honeymoon (2022). She again participated as a contestant on the reality show Khatron Ke Khiladi 15.

== Early life ==
Bhasin was born to a Sikh family in Kota, Rajasthan on 28 June 1990. She completed her schooling from Kota and graduated from a hospitality college in Jaipur.

== Personal life ==
Bhasin met actor Aly Goni during Fear Factor: Khatron Ke Khiladi 9 in 2018. In 2021, the two began dating each other after appearing in Bigg Boss 14.

== Career ==
=== Early career (2011–2016) ===
Bhasin started her acting career with the Tamil film Vaanam in 2011. She then acted in a few more South Indian films like Malayalam film Beware of Dogs (2014), Telugu films Veta (2014) and Ladies & Gentlemen (2015).

In August 2015, she made her television debut with Zee TV's popular romantic Tashan-e-Ishq as Twinkle Taneja opposite Zain Imam and Sidhant Gupta.

=== Breakthrough & recognition (2017–2020) ===
Bhasin at an event

In January 2017, she was seen portraying Teni Bhanushali in Colors TV's love triangle show Dil Se Dil Tak opposite Sidharth Shukla and Rashami Desai. The show went off air in June 2018.

She made her reality debut through participating in the stunt-based show Fear Factor: Khatron Ke Khiladi 9 where she finished at 7th place. From January 2019, she began portraying Happy Mehra in StarPlus's Dil Toh Happy Hai Ji. In June 2019, she got replaced by Donal Bisht.

In December 2019, she starred in Ekta Kapoor's popular supernatural franchise Naagin 4: Bhagya Ka Zehreela Khel portraying Nayantara Alongside Vijayendra Kumeria and Nia Sharma on Colors TV until her role ended two months later in February 2020 and Rashami Desai joins in with the same role.

In August 2020, she participated 2nd time in Colors TV's stunt-based reality show Khatron Ke Khiladi - Made In India where she finished at 3rd place.

=== Rise to prominence (2020–present) ===
In October 2020, she participated in Colors TV's reality show Bigg Boss 14 where she ended up at 11th position.

In 2021, she did several Hindi and Punjabi music videos with channel such as T-Series, Desi Music Factory and Saregama.

In January 2022, Bhasin started shooting for her first Punjabi film Honeymoon opposite Gippy Grewal in Chandigarh, filming completed in London in April 2022, and the film released on 25 October 2022.

In 2024, she starred in Carry on Jattiye, part of the Gippy Grewal-led Carry on Jatta franchise. In the same year, she starred in Ardaas Sarbat De Bhale Di, also with Grewal. In June 2025, she participated in Prime Video's The Traitors India, where she finished at 6th place.

== Media image ==
Bhasin in 2022

Bhasin was placed in Times Most Desirable Women on Television list several times. She was ranked 16th in 2018, 12th in 2019, and 3rd in 2020. Bhasin is also one of the most followed television actress on Instagram.

== Filmography ==
Key

†	Denotes films that have not yet been released

=== Films ===
Year	Title	Role	Language	Notes	Ref
2011	Vaanam	Priya	Tamil		
2014	Karoodpathi	Unknown	Kannada		
2014	Beware of Dogs	Meghna	Malayalam		
2014	Dillunnodu	Chaithra	Telugu		
2014	Veta	Sonal	Telugu		
2015	Ladies & Gentlemen	Anjali	Telugu		
2016	Jil Jung Juk	Sonu Sawant	Tamil		
2022	Honeymoon	Sukh	Punjabi		
2024	Warning 2	Ronak	Punjabi		
2024	Ardaas Sarbat De Bhale Di	Bani	Punjabi		
2025	Badnaam	Noor	Punjabi		
2026	Carry On Jattiye †	TBA	Punjabi	Completed	

=== Television ===
Year	Title	Role	Notes	Ref
2015–2016	Tashan-e-Ishq	Twinkle Taneja		
2017–2018	Dil Se Dil Tak	Teni Bhanushali		
2019	Khatron Ke Khiladi 9	Contestant	7th place	
2019	Dil Toh Happy Hai Ji	Happy Mehra		
2019–2020	Naagin: Bhagya Ka Zehreela Khel	Nayantara		
2020	Khatron Ke Khiladi – Made in India	Contestant	2nd runner-up	
2020–2021	Bigg Boss 14	Contestant	11th place (Evicted Day 100)	
2025	The Traitors India	Contestant	5th Place	
2026	Khatron Ke Khiladi 15	Contestant	9th Place	

==== Special appearances ====
Year	Title	Role	Ref.
2016	Jamai Raja	Twinkle	
2017	Shakti - Astitva Ke Ehsaas Ki	Teni	
2017	Bigg Boss 11	Teni	
2018	Laado 2 – Veerpur Ki Mardani	Teni	
2018	Tu Aashiqui	Teni	
2018	Belan Wali Bahu	Teni	
2018	Bigg Boss 12	Herself	
2018	Box Cricket League 3	Herself	
2019	Nach Baliye 9	Herself	
2019	Dance Deewane 2	Herself	
2019	Khatra Khatra Khatra	Herself	
2020	Bigg Boss 13	Nayantara	
2020	Funhit Mein Jaari	Golu's mother	
2020	Fear Factor: Khatron Ke Khiladi 10	Herself	
2021	Bigg Boss 14	Herself	
2021	Dance Deewane 3	Herself	
2021	Ladies vs Gentlemen 2	Herself	
2022	Dance Deewane Juniors 1	Herself	
2024	Laughter Chefs – Unlimited Entertainment	Herself	

=== Web series ===
Year	Title	Role	Notes	Ref.
2023	Jab We Matched	Payal	Episode: "Jalkukde"	

=== Music video appearances ===
Year	Title	Singer(s)	Notes	Ref.
2021	"Tera Suit"	Tony Kakkar		
2021	"Pani Di Gal"	Maninder Buttar, Asees Kaur		
2021	"Tu Bhi Sataya Jayega"	Vishal Mishra		
2021	"Aly"	Rahul Vaidya	Archival footage	
2021	"Tenu Yaad Karaan"	Gurnazar Chattha, Asees Kaur		
2021	"2 Phone"	Neha Kakkar		
2021	"Peene Lage Ho"	Rohanpreet Singh		
2021	"Pyaar Ek Tarfaa"	Amaal Malik, Shreya Ghoshal		
2021	"Chann Mahiya Ve"	Ishaan Khan		
2021	"Pyaar Karte Ho Na"	Stebin Ben, Shreya Ghoshal		
2022	"Yaaron Sab Dua Karo"	Stebin Ben, Meet Bros, Danish Sabri		
2022	"Kya Kar Diya"	Vishal Mishra		
2022	"Ijazzat Hai"	Raj Barman		
2022	"Iss Baarish Mein"	Yasser Desai, Neeti Mohan		
2022	"Sajaunga Lutkar Bhi"	Shaan, Neeti Mohan		
2022	"Hum Dono"	Arko		
2022	"Morey Saiyaan Ji"	Maninder Buttar		
2022	"Jitna Tujhe Chahte Hai Hum"	Raj Barman		
2023	"Kya Karoon"	Sanam Puri		
2023	"Shaadi Karogi?"	Tony Kakkar, Annie Khalid		
2023	"Teri Yaadein"	Stebin Ben		
2023	"Allah De Bandeya"	B Praak		
2023	"Saawan Aa Gaya"	Neha Kakkar, Rohanpreet Singh		
2024	"Kurti"	Gippy Grewal		

== Awards and nominations ==
Year	Award	Category	Work	Results	Ref.
2022	Lokmat Stylish Awards	Most Stylish Emerging Face	—N/a	Won	
2022	Iconic Gold Awards	Iconic Stylish Women	—N/a	Won	
