= Aly Goni =

Indian actor and model (born 1988)

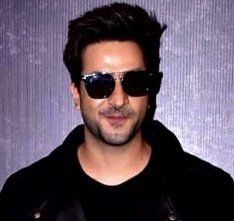
- Goni in 2018
- Born: 25 February 1991 (age 35); Bhaderwah, Jammu & Kashmir, India
- Occupations: Actor; model
- Years active: 2012–present
- Known for: Naagin 3; Bigg Boss 14
- Partner: Jasmin Bhasin (2021- Present)

Aly Goni (born 25 February 1991) is an Indian actor and model who appears in Hindi television. He made his debut through participating in MTV's dating reality show Splitsvilla 5. Goni rose to fame after portraying Romesh Bhalla in StarPlus's romantic Yeh Hai Mohabbatein till 2019. He has also participated in stunt-based reality show Khatron Ke Khiladi 9, and Nach Baliye 9 both in 2019.

In 2020, Goni participated in Colors TV's reality show Bigg Boss 14 where he finished at 4th place. In 2024, He has participated in Colors TV's cooking based popular show Laughter Chefs – Unlimited Entertainment

== Early life ==
Goni was born on 25 February 1991 to a Muslim family in Bhaderwah, Jammu & Kashmir. He is the son of Ruby and Amjad Goni. He has a sister named Ilham Goni.

== Personal life ==
Goni met actress Jasmin Bhasin during Fear Factor: Khatron Ke Khiladi 9. They initially became friends and started dating in 2021 after their stint on Bigg Boss 14.

== Career ==
In 2012, Aly started his career by participating in the reality show MTV Splitsvilla 5.

In 2013, he made his acting debut with Star Plus's Yeh Hai Mohabbatein where he played Romi Bhalla until its end in December 2019.

In 2015, he started playing the main lead Raj Kapoor by replacing Vibhav Roy in Star Plus's Kuch Toh Hai Tere Mere Darmiyaan and the show went off the air in January 2016.

In 2016, he played the role of Kabir Raichand in &TV's Yeh Kahan Aa Gaye Hum. He later played the role of Virat in Life OK's Bahu Hamari Rajni Kant.

In 2017, he played Sushant in StarPlus's Dhhai Kilo Prem.

In 2018, he appeared as Naman Kapoor in Sony TV's Dil Hi Toh Hai. In September 2018, He made his music video debut with song "Cheater Mohan" which was sung by Kanika Kapoor. He also played a negative character of Vyom in Naagin 3.

In 2019, he participated in Colors TV's Fear Factor: Khatron Ke Khiladi 9. He also appeared in Colors TV's comedy show Khatra Khatra Khatra. In June 2019, he did his second music video named "Tere Jism 2".In July 2019, he participated in Star Plus's dance reality show Nach Baliye 9 with Nataša Stanković as an ex couple.

In 2020, he participated in Colors TV's Fear Factor: Khatron Ke Khiladi – Made in India. In November 2020, he entered Colors TV's Bigg Boss 14 as a wild-card contestant

He made his web series debut as Surya Sethi in ZEE5's Jeet Ki Zid in January 2021.

== In the media ==
Goni was ranked 12th in 2018, 14th in 2019, and 3rd in 2020 in the Times of India's 20 Most Desirable Men on Indian Television. He was ranked at 22nd position in its 50 Most Desirable Men of 2020.

== Filmography ==
=== Television ===
Year	Title	Role	Notes	Ref.
2012	Splitsvilla 5	Contestant	8th place	
2013	V The Serial	Himself		
2013–2019	Yeh Hai Mohabbatein	Romesh "Romi" Bhalla		
2015–2016	Kuch Toh Hai Tere Mere Darmiyaan	Raj Kapoor		
2016	Yeh Kahan Aa Gaye Hum	Kabir "Agni" Raichand		
2016	Bahu Hamari Rajni Kant	Virat Batra		
2017	Dhhai Kilo Prem	Sushant		
2018	Dil Hi Toh Hai	Naman Kapoor		
2018	Naagin 3	Vyom		
2019	Khatron Ke Khiladi 9	Contestant	5th place	
2019	Nach Baliye 9	Contestant	3rd runner-up	
2020	Khatron Ke Khiladi – Made in India	Contestant	5th place	
2020–2021	Bigg Boss 14	Contestant	3rd runner-up	
2024–2026	Laughter Chefs – Unlimited Entertainment	Himself	Winning Team (Season 3)	

==== Special appearances ====
Year	Title	Role	Notes
2013	Splitsvilla 6	Himself	
2014	Aur Pyaar Ho Gaya	Himself	
2014–2019	Box Cricket League	Player	4 seasons
2015	Dance Plus 1	Raj Kapoor	
2015	Saath Nibhaana Saathiya	Raj Kapoor	
2015	Yeh Rishta Kya Kehlata Hai	Raj Kapoor	
2019	Kitchen Champion 5	Himself	
2019	Khatra Khatra Khatra	Himself	
2020	Fear Factor: Khatron Ke Khiladi 10	Himself	Episodes 21-22
2021	Fear Factor: Khatron Ke Khiladi 11	Himself	Episode 8

=== Web series ===
Year	Title	Role	Notes	Ref.
2021	Jeet Ki Zid	Surya Sethi		
2025	Khadaan	Veer		
2026	Alliance	Contestant	3rd runner up	

=== Music video appearances ===
Year	Title	Singer(s)	Notes	Ref.
2018	"Cheater Mohan"	Kanika Kapoor, Ikka		
2019	"Tere Jism 2"	Altaaf Sayyed		
2021	"Tera Suit"	Tony Kakkar		
2021	"Tu Bhi Sataya Jayega"	Vishal Mishra		
2021	"Aly"	Rahul Vaidya	Archival footage	
2021	"2 Phone"	Neha Kakkar		
2021	"Jodaa"	Afsana Khan		
2022	"Jumme Di Namaaz"	Dhruv Malik		
2022	"Sajaunga Lutkar Bhi"	Shaan, Neeti Mohan		
2023	"Allah De Bandeya"	B Praak		
2023	"Saawan Aa Gaya"	Neha Kakkar, Rohanpreet Singh		
2026	"Maula"	Javed Ali		

== See also ==
- List of Indian television actors
