= Khatron Ke Khiladi: Made in India =

Indian Reality Series

- Title screen
- Native name: Made in India
- Presented by: Farah Khan (Episode 1–2); Rohit Shetty (Episode 3–10)
- No. of contestants: 9
- Winner: Nia Sharma
- Runner-up: Karan Wahi
- Location: India
- No. of episodes: 10

Release
- Original network: Colors TV
- Original release: 1 August – 30 August 2020

Season chronology
- ← Previous; Season 10 Next → Season 11

Khatron Ke Khiladi: Made in India (Players of Danger: Made in India) is a spin-off of Khatron ke Khiladi, an Indian reality and stunt television series featuring previous contestants of the show. The show aired from 1 August 2020 to 30 August 2020 on Colors TV. The series is produced by Endemol India, and is hosted by Rohit Shetty, and Farah Khan as interim host for first 2 episodes. Inclusions were made from season 7 to 10 only. Nia Sharma was declared as the winner of this limited edition followed by Karan Wahi as Runner up. This season was filmed entirely in Mumbai.

== Contestants ==
Contestant	Occupation	Previous KKK Status		Status	Place	Ref
Contestant	Occupation	Season	Placement	Status	Place	Ref
Nia Sharma	Actress	Season 8	4th	Winner (Week 5)	1st	
Karan Wahi	Actor	Season 8	8th	1st Runner-up (Week 5)	2nd	
Jasmin Bhasin	Actress	Season 9	7th	2nd runner-up (Week 5)	3rd	
Bharti Singh	Comedian	Season 9	6th	Eliminated (Week 5)	4th	
Aly Goni	Actor	Season 9	5th	Eliminated (Week 5)	5th	
Jay Bhanushali	Actor & Presenter	Season 7	9th	Eliminated (Week 5)	6th	
Haarsh Limbachiyaa	Producer & Writer	Season 9	9th	Eliminated (Week 5)	7th	
Karan Patel	Actor	Season 10	2nd	Eliminated (Week 3)	8th	
Rithvik Dhanjani	Actor	Season 8	7th	Quit (Week 2)	9th	

Indicates original entrants
Indicates the wild card entrants

== Elimination chart ==
	Weeks																					
	1				2				3				4					5				
	Grand Premiere (Champion's Jacket Race)				2				3				Ticket To Finale		Stuntmen Special			Grand Finale				
	1 Aug	2 Aug			8 Aug		9 Aug		15 Aug		16 Aug		22 Aug		23 Aug			29 Aug			30 Aug	
Nia	LOST	N/A			WIN				LOST	N/A	SAFE		LOST	N/A	WIN			WIN			WIN	Winner
Karan W	WIN	LOST	N/A		LOST		BTM2	SAFE	WIN	WIN			WIN	WIN	Ticket to Finale			LOST	BTM3	SAFE	WIN	1st Runner-up
Jasmin	LOST	N/A			WIN				WIN	WIN			LOST	N/A	LOST	BTM2	SAFE	WIN			WIN	2nd Runner-up
Bharti	NOT IN COMPETITION				Wild Card	WIN	WINBharti_won		WIN	LOST	BTM3	SAFE	WIN	LOST	LOST	BTM2	SAFE	WIN			LOST	ELIMINATED
Aly	LOST	N/A			LOST		SAFE		LOST	N/A	BTM3	SAFE	LOST	N/A	SAFE			SAFE			LOST	ELIMINATED
Jay	LOST	N/A			LOST		BTM2	SAFE	WIN	LOST	SAFE		LOST	N/A	SAFE			LOST	BTM3	ELIMINATED		
Haarsh	WIN	WIN	LOST		LOST		SAFE		LOST	N/A	SAFE		WIN	LOST	WIN			LOST	BTM3	ELIMINATED		
Karan P	WIN	LOST	N/A		WIN				LOST	N/A	BTM3	ELIMINATED										
Rithvik	WIN	WIN	WIN	Jacket	LOST		SAFE	QUIT														

Winner
1st runner-up
2nd runner-up
Finalists
The contestant won the stunt or was on the winning team and exempted from performing further stunts for the week/cycle.
The contestant lost the stunt and received Fear Funda.
The contestant got rid of Fear Funda by winning pre-elimination stunt.
The contestant was placed in the bottom and performed elimination stunt.
The contestant was safe from elimination by winning elimination stunt.
The contestant was exempted from performing pre-elimination and elimination stunt
The contestant was eliminated.
Jacket - The contestant won a special advantage.
Not in Competition
The contestant was a Wild Card Entry
The contestant quit the show.
