= Karodpathi =

2014 film

- Directed by: Ramesh PCR
- Produced by: SSS Suresh
- Starring: Komal; Jasmin Bhasin
- Cinematography: R Selva
- Edited by: K M Prakash
- Music by: Abhimann Roy
- Production company: S S S Combines
- Release date: 14 March 2014
- Country: India
- Language: Kannada

Karodpathi is a 2014 Indian Kannada-language film directed by Ramesh PCR, starring Komal and Jasmin Bhasin in lead roles.

== Cast ==
- Komal as Banti Babu
- Jasmin Bhasin
- Meera Nandan as Vidya
- Dingri Nagaraj
- Guruprasad as Kotilinga
- Jayasri Krishna
- Malavika Avinash
- Muni

== Music ==
Music by Abhimann Roy. Komal sang a song in the film.

Karodpathi (ಕರೂದ್ಪಥಿ)

Soundtrack album by Abhimann Roy
- Released: 2014
- Recorded: 2014
- Genre: Feature film soundtrack
- Length: 20:25
- Language: Kannada

Official audio
- Karodpathi - Full Album on YouTube

Track listing
No.	Title	Singer(s)	Length
1.	"Sarasakke Baare Sarala"	L. R. Ramanujam	3:54
2.	" Sunnoo Single Moonu Single"	Komal, Supriya Lohith, Yashii	3:48
3.	"Telide Neeli Baanu"	Somashekhar Jois, Yashii	4:21
4.	"Namma Maneya Aramaneyalli"	Rajesh Krishnan	4:20
5.	"Karoodpathi"	Daniel J. Kiran, Kiran Sagar, Supriya Lohith	3:29
6.	"Hanebarahake"	L. R. Ramanujam	1:13
Total length:			20:25

== Reception ==
Shyam Prasad S of Bangalore Mirror scored the film at 3 out of 5 stars and says "Karodpathi was delayed to change the plot but not much seems to have been changed. Another Kannada film, Dasavala also had a similar plot. All these films can be traced back to the 1996 Brazilian film Segredos em Família in which a lonely rich man hires actors to act as his family members on his birthday".The Times of India scored the film at 3 out of 5 stars and wrote "Komal has done a wonderful job, especially in the sentimental sequences. Guruprasad shines in dialogue delivery. Meera Nandan is okay. Abhiman Roy’s music is a highlight. Selva’s cinematography is good". Sify wrote "Music by Abhiman Roy which has gone viral is the only gluing part of the movie. Director C Ramesh needs to do his homework before he gets his hand on other project for the betterment Kannada films".
