= Veta (2014 film) =

- Directed by: Ashok Teja
- Written by: Ashok Teja
- Produced by: C. V. Rao; C. Kalyan
- Starring: Srikanth; Tarun; Madhuurima; Jasmin Bhasin
- Cinematography: Bhupathy
- Edited by: Goutham Raju
- Music by: Chakri
- Distributed by: Teja Cinema
- Release date: 21 March 2014
- Country: India
- Language: Telugu

Veta (transl. Hunt) is a 2014 Indian Telugu action film written and directed by Ashok Teja and starring Srikanth, Tarun, Jasmine and Madhurima. The film was a box office failure.

== Cast ==
- Srikanth as Jagan
- Tarun as Karthik
- Nyra Banerjee as Devraj's sister
- Jasmin Bhasin as Sonal
- Ajaz Khan as Devraj
- Deepthi Vajpayee as Pravalika

== Production ==
Srikanth and Tarun did not know they are acting in the film till the day after they both accepted the film. The film was supposed to release in 2013 but only released in 2014 after a major portion was reshot.

== Soundtrack ==
Music composed by Chakri. Album consists of 6 songs. Venkatesh, Tanish, VV Vinayak, Prince Cecil, Siva Reddy, D. Ramanaidu, and Taraka Ratna attended the audio launch as chief guests.

- 01 – "Yevaro Yevaro – K Hari
- 02 – "Sarigamale Sarigamale" – Kousalya, Hariharan
- 03 – "Okate Okate Okate" – Chakri
- 04 – "Bavagaru Bavagaru" – Geetha Madhuri, Simha
- 05 – "I Love You Antunna" – Kunal Ganjawala
- 06 – "Katreena Katreena" – Uma Neha, M Vasu

== Reception ==
A critic from The Times of India wrote that "It's a simple revenge drama in which the motive of the revenge is revealed late in the second half. But by that time you are beyond the point of caring". A critic from The Hans India rated the film 2.75/5.
