= Khatra Khatra Khatra =

Indian comedy and game show

- Genre: Comedy show; Game show
- Created by: Ajay Kumar
- Developed by: Sachin Kumar
- Written by: Haarsh Limbachiyaa
- Directed by: Akshay Rathore
- Starring: See below
- Opening theme: Khatra Hai Khatra
- Country of origin: India
- Original language: Hindi
- No. of seasons: 3
- No. of episodes: 196

Production
- Producer: Haarsh Limbachiyaa
- Running time: 45 minutes
- Production company: H3 Entertainment

Original release
- Network: Colors TV (2019–2022); Voot (2022)
- Release: 11 March 2019 – 20 May 2022

Khatra Khatra Khatra (Danger Danger Danger) also known as The Khatra Khatra Show (transl. The Danger Danger Show) and The Khatra Show, is an Indian comedy game show series starring Bharti Singh and Haarsh Limbachiyaa, along with many guest stars that aired on Colors TV. The show is also digitally available on Voot.

== Plot ==
Bharti, Harsh and others have a short skit. Later, they play games on the show and losers are given punishments. They are contestants who also prank each other. In the meantime, all the celebs crack jokes on each other. Bharti and Harsh also taunt each other. In Seasons 1 and 2, Gaurav Dubey enters portraying different characters such as Khatri and cracks jokes on all the celebrities.

== Series overview ==
Season	Title	Episodes	Originally broadcast (India)	
Season	Title	Episodes	First aired	Last aired
1	Khatra Khatra Khatra	130	11 March 2019	11 September 2019
2	The Khatra Show	15	14 September 2019	1 November 2019
3	The Khatra Khatra Show	51	11 March 2022	20 May 2022

== Cast ==
=== Host ===
- Haarsh Limbachiyaa as himself (Season 1–3)
- Bharti Singh as herself (Season 1–3)
- Punit Pathak as himself (Season 1–3)
- Aditya Narayan as himself (Season 1–3)
- Farah Khan as herself (Season 3)
- Gaurav Dubey as Khatri/Budget Sharma/Various characters (season 1-2)
- Garvit Parekh as various characters(season 1-3)

=== Guests/contestants ===
- Raghav Juyal
- Jasmin Bhasin
- Jannat Zubair Rahmani
- Anita Hassanandani
- Avika Gor
- Ridhima Pandit
- Usha Nadkarni
- Shraddha Arya
- Hina Khan
- Neha Pendse
- Neeti Mohan
- Shruti Sharma
- Aditi Bhatia
- Karan Patel
- Rubina Dilaik
- Reem Shaikh
- Ishita Dutta
- Aparna Dixit
- Aastha Gill
- Aparshakti Khurana
- Tahira Kashyap
- Anushka Sen
- Debina Bonnerjee
- Sana Makbul
- Swapnil Joshi
- Priya Banerjee
- Aryan Prajapati
- Rashami Desai
- Karan Kundrra
- Sanaya Irani
- Kanika Mann
- Mallika Sherawat
- Surbhi Chandna
- Karishma Tanna
- Erica Fernandes
- Parth Samthaan
- Niti Taylor
- Tulsi Kumar
- Kritika Kamra
- Sagarika Ghatge
- Monalisa
- Nagma Mirajkar
- Nora Fatehi
- Akansha Ranjan
- Neha Kakkar
- Sonu Kakkar
- Rani Chatterjee
- Rakhi Sawant
- Abhishek Verma
- Vighnesh Pande
- Mika Singh
- Mudassar Khan
- Varun Sharma
- Pearl V Puri
- Ravi Kishan
- Shantanu Maheshwari
- Nikitin Dheer
- Awez Darbar
- Abhinav Shukla
- Krip Suri
- Vishal Vashishtha
- Divyansh Dwivedi
- Badshah
- Vikas Gupta
- Tusshar Kapoor
- Oupseng Namchum
- Tony Kakkar
- Darshan Raval
- Ankit Tiwari
- Marzi Pestonji
- Priyank Sharma
- Dharmesh Yelande
- Avinesh Rekhi
- Himansh Kohli
- Akshat Singh
- Arjun Bijlani
- Mohit Malik
- Karan Singh Grover
- Tushar Kalia
- Sohail Khan
- Meet Bros
- Prince Narula
- Karanvir Bohra
- Jubin Nautiyal
- Hitesh Bharadwaj
- Puja Banerjee
- Sana Khan
- Spandan Chaturvedi
- Meera Deosthale
- Mohena Singh
- Babai Karmakar
- Sonu Sood
- Shakti Mohan
- Mukti Mohan
- Bhumi Pednekar
- Taapsee Pannu
- Vineet Kumar
- Teejay Sidhu
- Jacqueline Fernandez
- Parineeti Chopra
- Geeta Basra
- Harbhajan Singh
- Munmun Dutta
- Nikki Tamboli
- Nishant Bhat
- Rahul Vaidya
- Umar Riaz
- Vishal Aditya Singh
- Aly Goni
- Tejasswi Prakash
- Shamita Shetty
- Nimrit Kaur Ahluwalia

== See also ==
- List of Hindi comedy shows
