= Nia Sharma =

Indian actress and model (born 1990)

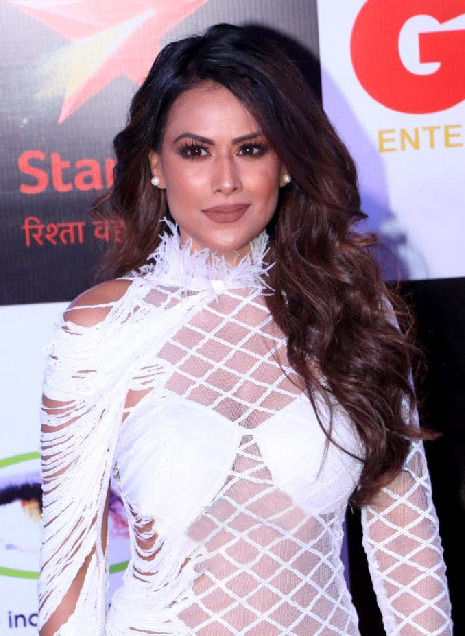
- Sharma in 2022
- Born: Neha Sharma; 17 September 1990 (age 36); Delhi, India
- Occupations: Actress; model
- Years active: 2010–present
- Notable work: Jamai Raja; Ishq Mein Marjawan; Naagin 4

Nia Sharma (pronounced [ˈniːjaː ˈʃəɾmaː]; born Neha Sharma; 17 September 1990) is an Indian actress and model who appears in Hindi television. She is known for her roles as Manvi Chaudhary in Ek Hazaaron Mein Meri Behna Hai, Zee TV's Jamai Raja as Roshni Patel, Colors TV's Ishq Mein Marjawan as Aarohi Kashyap and Naagin 4 as Brinda Parekh. In 2017, she participated in Khatron Ke Khiladi 8 and finished as a finalist.

In 2020, she participated in Khatron Ke Khiladi – Made in India and emerged as the winner. Sharma entered the digital world in 2017 with Vikram Bhatt's web series Twisted. In 2021, she was seen in the second season of her web series Jamai 2.0, which released digitally on ZEE5. In 2022, Sharma was seen as a contestant in Colors TV's dance reality show Jhalak Dikhhla Jaa 10.

She made her comeback on television by starring in Colors TV's supernatural thriller show Suhagan Chudail. Sharma also participated in Laughter Chefs – Unlimited Entertainment which premiered on 1 June 2024 on Colors TV.

== Early life ==
Neha Sharma was born on 17 September 1990. However, for career reasons she changed it to Nia as "industry has lot of Nehas".

== Career ==
=== 2010–2013: Debut and breakthrough ===
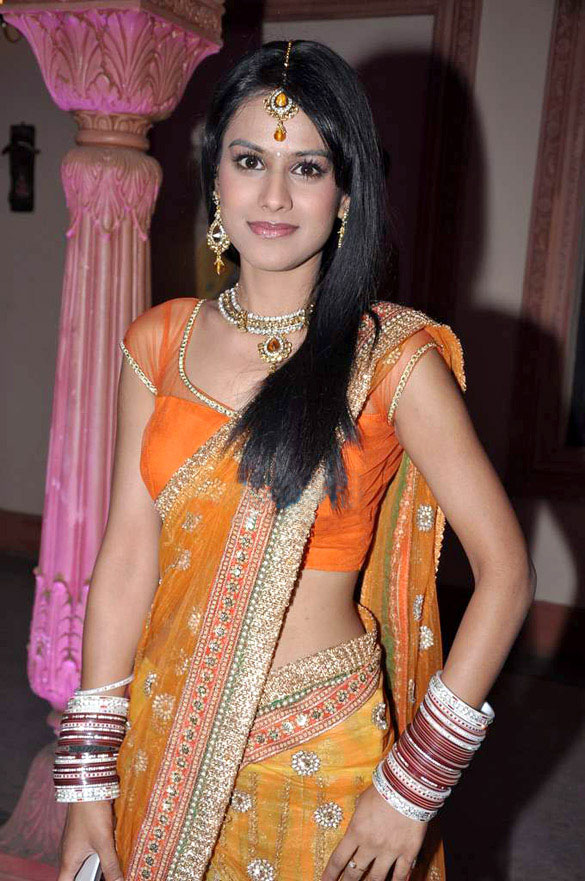
Sharma on the sets of Ek Hazaaron Mein Meri Behna Hai, her first prominent success

Sharma started her acting career into television in 2010 with Star Plus's Kaali - Ek Agnipariksha, appearing as Anu. She then played Nisha Mehta in the channel's multi starrer Behenein.

Sharma got her first break when she signed the parallel main lead role of Manvi Chaudhary alongside Krystle D'Souza, Karan Tacker and Kushal Tandon in Star Plus's Ek Hazaaron Mein Meri Behna Hai which had a successful run of 2 years, from 2011 to 2013.

=== 2014–2020: Establishment and awards success ===
Sharma then signed Zee TV's Jamai Raja portraying the role of Roshni Patel opposite Ravi Dubey, produced by Bollywood superstar Akshay Kumar, which she was a part of from 2014 until she quit the show in 2016. In 2017, she marked her debut on digital platform with Vikram Bhatt's web series Twisted, an erotic thriller where she co-starred with Rrahul Sudhir and Namit Khanna as Aliyah Mukherjee, a supermodel.

In July 2017, Sharma participated in eighth season of Colors TV's popular stunt-based reality show Fear Factor: Khatron Ke Khiladi hosted by Rohit Shetty. She was eliminated from the show two times, before re-entering again, and survived until the show ended, emerging as the first finalist.

Sharma next reprised her character in the second and third season of Twisted In July 2018 she found her next character in Colors TV's suspense thriller series Ishq Mein Marjawan, in which she had the double role of Aarohi Kashyap and Anjali Sharma opposite Arjun Bijlani until the show ended in June 2019, which had a successful run of 2 years. Later she reunited with Dubey in the web series Jamai 2.0 on ZEE5.

In November 2019, she joined Naagin 4: Bhagya Ka Zehreela Khel, the fourth season of Colors TV's supernatural revenge franchise Naagin produced by Ekta Kapoor, in which she starred as shape shifting serpent Brinda opposite Vijayendra Kumeria until it went off air in August 2020. Just after its culmination, she participated in Fear Factor: Khatron Ke Khiladi – Made in India and became winner.

=== 2021–present: OTT projects and Jhalak Dikhhla Jaa 10 ===
The second season of ZEE5's Jamai 2.0 was launched in 2021, where Sharma and Dubey united for the fourth time. In September 2021, she was a guest for just one day in the OTT version of popular game reality show Bigg Boss.

In 2022, she participated in Colors TV's dance-based reality show Jhalak Dikhhla Jaa by pairing up with choreographer Tarun Raj Nihalani, and finished at 8th place.

From May 2024 to September 2024, Sharma made her TV comeback through Colors TV's Suhagan Chudail by portraying titular character, a witch Nishigandha alongside Zayn Ibad Khan and Debchandrima Singha Roy.

== In the media ==
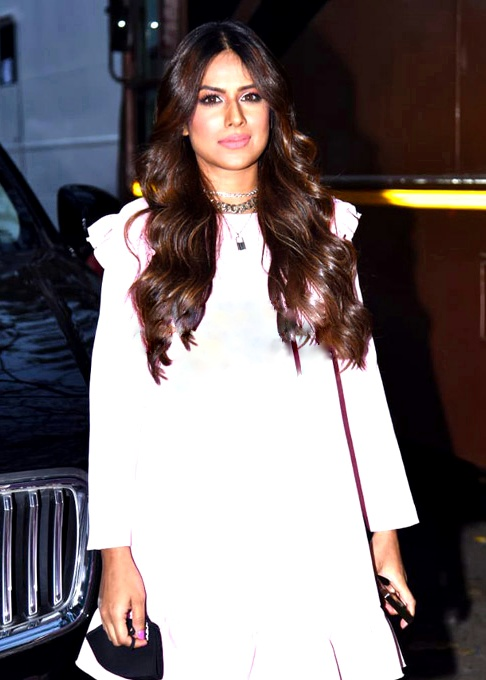
Sharma at an event in 2022

Sharma's acting performances in Ek Hazaaron Mein Meri Behna Hai, Jamai Raja, Ishq Mein Marjawan and Naagin: Bhagya Ka Zehreela Khel established her as a leading actress of Indian television industry.

Sharma was placed 3rd in 2016 and 2nd in 2017 in the Top 50 Sexiest Asian Women List by UK-based newspaper Eastern Eye. In 2018, Times ranked her 6th in the Top 10 Popular Actress in Television. In 2020, Sharma was placed 2nd in Times Most Desirable Women on TV. In 2023, she ranked 6th in Times Now "Popular Television Actresses" list.

== Filmography ==
=== Television ===
Year	Title	Role	Notes	Ref.
2010–2011	Kaali - Ek Agnipariksha	Anu		
2011	Behenein	Nisha Mehta		
2011–2013	Ek Hazaaron Mein Meri Behna Hai	Manvi Chaudhary		
2014–2016	Jamai Raja	Roshni Patel		
2017	Khatron Ke Khiladi 8	Contestant	4th place	
2018–2019	Ishq Mein Marjawan	Aarohi Kashyap		
2019–2020	Naagin 4	Brinda Parekh		
2020	Khatron Ke Khiladi: Made in India	Contestant	Winner	
2022	Jhalak Dikhhla Jaa 10	Contestant	8th place	
2024	Suhagan Chudail	Nishigandha "Nishi"		
2024–2025	Laughter Chefs – Unlimited Entertainment	Contestant	Season 1–2	
2026	MTV Splitsvilla 16	Mischief Maker		

==== Special appearances ====
Year	Title	Role
2011	The Player	Herself
2012	Iss Pyaar Ko Kya Naam Doon?	Manvi
2012	Nayi Soch Ki Talaash Aamir Ke Saath	Manvi
2012–2013	Starlite	Manvi
2012	Yeh Rishta Kya Kehlata Hai	Manvi
2012	Pyaar Ka Dard Hai Meetha Meetha Pyaara Pyaara	Manvi
2014	Box Cricket League 1	Player
2014	Pavitra Rishta	Roshni
2014	Qubool Hai	Roshni
2015	Killerr Karaoke Atka Toh Latkah	Guest
2016	Comedy Nights Bachao	Guest
2016	Tashan-e-Ishq	Roshni
2017	Bhaag Bakool Bhaag	Herself
2017	Rasoi Ki Jung Mummyon Ke Sung	Herself
2018	Aap Ke Aa Jane Se	Herself
2018	Udaan	Aarohi
2018	Internet Wala Love	Aarohi
2018	Ace of Space 1	Herself
2018	Naagin 3	Aarohi
2019	Shakti - Astitva Ke Ehsaas Ki	Aarohi
2019	Bigg Boss 13	Brinda
2020	Naagin 5	Brinda
2020	Fear Factor: Khatron Ke Khiladi 10	Herself
2020–2021	Ladies vs Gentlemen	Panelist
2021	Bigg Boss OTT	Herself
2021	Zee Comedy Show	Herself
2021	Bigg Boss 15	Herself
2023	Tere Ishq Mein Ghayal	Herself

=== Web series ===
Year	Title	Role	Ref.
2017–2018	Twisted	Aliyah Mukerjee	
2019–2021	Jamai 2.0	Roshni Patel	

=== Music videos ===
Year	Title	Singer(s)	Ref.
2017	Waada	Tony Kakkar	
2019	Hor Pila	Jyotica Tangri	
2020	Gale Lagana Hai	Neha Kakkar, Tony Kakkar	
2021	Tum Bewafa Ho	Payal Dev, Stebin Ben	
2021	Ankhiyaan Da Ghar	Yasser Desai	
2021	Do Ghoont	Shruti Rane	
2021	Garbe Ki Raat	Rahul Vaidya, Bhoomi Trivedi	
2022	Phoonk Le	Nikhita Gandhi	
2022	Hairaan	Javed Ali	
2022	Paisa Paisa	Star Boy LOC	
2023	Soul	Yo Yo Honey Singh	

== Awards ==
List of awards and nominations
Year	Award	Category	Work	Result	Ref.
2012	Indian Television Academy Awards	Best Actress Drama Popular	Ek Hazaaron Mein Meri Behna Hai	Won	
2013	Indian Telly Awards	Best Actress in a Lead Role	Ek Hazaaron Mein Meri Behna Hai	Nominated	
2014	Indian Television Academy Awards	Best Onscreen Couple	Jamai Raja	Nominated	
2015	Indian Television Academy Awards	Gr8! Face Female	Jamai Raja	Won	
2015	Indian Telly Awards	Best Onscreen Couple	Jamai Raja	Nominated	
2015	Zee Gold Awards	Best Actress in a Lead Role	Jamai Raja	Nominated	
2015	Zee Gold Awards	Most Popular Jodi	Jamai Raja	Nominated	
2019	Indian Telly Awards	Best Actress in a Lead Role	Ishq Mein Marjawan	Nominated	
2023	Bollywood Hungama Style Icons	Most Stylish TV Star (Female)	—N/a	Nominated	

== See also ==
- List of Indian television actresses
- List of Hindi film actresses
