= Karan Patel =

Indian actor and host (born 1983)

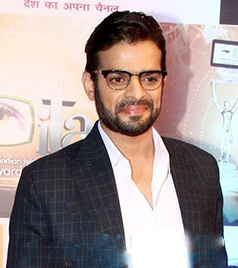
- Karan Patel at ITA Awards 2015
- Born: 23 November 1983 (age 42); Kolkata, West Bengal, India
- Occupations: Actor; host
- Years active: 2003–present
- Known for: Kasturi; Yeh Hai Mohabbatein; Fear Factor: Khatron Ke Khiladi 10; Kasautii Zindagii Kay 2
- Spouse: Ankita Bhargava Patel (m. 2015)
- Children: 1

Karan Patel (born 23 November 1983) is an Indian actor and host on Hindi television. Patel is known for his roles in Yeh Hai Mohabbatein and Kasautii Zindagii Kay 2. He also participated in Nach Baliye 3, Jhalak Dikhhla Jaa 6 and Khatron Ke Khiladi 10.

== Early life ==
Patel is a Gujarati who was born in Kolkata on 23 November 1983. His father's name is Rashesh Patel. He has also attended Shiamak Davar's dance classes.

== Career ==
Patel starred in the Star Plus series Kasturi, where he played Robbie Sabarwal, his first lead role. Previously, he played a number of roles in Balaji Telefilms. His first role was in Kahaani Ghar Ghar Kii where he played Vigyat. He has also worked in Kasautii Zindagii Kay and Kasamh Se.

In 2008 he debuted as host by anchoring a new show Kaho Na Yaar Hai. In 2013, he participated in Jhalak Dikhhla Jaa. He played the role of Raman Bhalla in Yeh Hai Mohabbatein From 2013 to 2019. He quit the show in July 2019. But re entered in November 2019. His role as Raman Kumar Omprakash Bhalla with his co-star Divyanka T Dahiya earned him Zee Gold Awards for Best Actor (Popular) three years in a row (2014–16), the Indian Television Academy Award 2015 for Best Romantic Actor (Male), and the Indian Telly Award for Best Actor in a Lead Role. In 2020 he participated in Fear Factor: Khatron Ke Khiladi 10. The same year he played the role of Rishabh Bajaj in Kasautii Zindagii Kay Where he replaced Karan Singh Grover.

In September 2026, Patel was confirmed as one of the first four contestants of Rise & Fall Season 2, a reality show hosted by former cricketer Virender Sehwag. The show premiered on 26 September 2026 with a line-up of 15 contestants.

== Filmography ==
=== Films ===
Year	Title	Role	Notes	Ref(s)
2010	City of Gold	Naru		
2013	Shootout at Wadala	Jamal	Bhaskar's bodyguard	
2018	Phamous	Goli	Local goon and Radhe's friend	
2022	Raktanchal 2	ACP Himanshu Patnaik	Mumbai Police ACP	
2023	Darran Chhoo			

=== Television ===
Year	Title	Role	Ref
2003	Kahani Ghar Ghar Ki	Vigyat	
2005–2006	Kasautii Zindagi Kay	Karan	
2005	Kesar	Ryan	
2005	Kkavyanjali	Kanishk	
2006	Kasamh Se	Rohit Ranvijay Chopra	
2006–2007	Karam Apnaa Apnaa	Vivan Kapoor	
2007–2009	Kasturi	Robbie Sabarwal	
2007	Nach Baliye 3	Contestant	
2008	Kaun Jeetega Bollywood Ka Ticket	Contestant	
2008	Kaho Na Yaar Hai	Host	
2012	Survivor India	Contestant	
2012	Teri Meri Love Stories	Yug Saxena	
2013	Jhalak Dikhhla Jaa 6	Contestant	
2013–2019	Yeh Hai Mohabbatein	Raman Kumar Bhalla	
2014–2015	Box Cricket League 1	Contestant	
2015–2016	Gumrah – End Of Innocence	Host	
2015	Nach Baliye 7	Host	
2015	Jhalak Dikhhla Jaa 8	Guest	
2016	I Don't Watch TV	Guest	
2016	Box Cricket League 2	Contestant	
2017	Nach Baliye 8	Guest	
2017	Bigg Boss 11	Guest	
2017	Entertainment Ki Raat	Guest	
2018	MTV Troll Police	Guest	
2018	Dus Ka Dum	Guest	
2018	Sabse Smart Kaun	Guest	
2018	Bigg Boss 12	Guest	
2018	MTV Ace Of Space 1	Guest	
2019	Kitchen Champion 5	Contestant	
2019	Khatra Khatra Khatra	Contestant	
2019	Nach Baliye 9	Guest	
2019	Yeh Hai Chahatein	Raman Kumar Bhalla (Guest)	
2020	Fear Factor: Khatron Ke Khiladi 10	Contestant	
2020	Bigg Boss 13	Guest	
2020	Kasautii Zindagii Kay	Rishabh Bajaj	
2021	Fear Factor: Khatron Ke Khiladi – Made in India	Contestant	
2021	Bigg Boss 14	Guest	
2021	Fear Factor: Khatron Ke Khiladi 11	Guest	
2021	Bigg Boss 15	Guest	
2026	The 50	Contestant	
2026	Indian Game Show	Contestant	
2026	Rise and Fall 2	Contestant	

== Awards ==
Year	Award	Category	Show	Result	Ref
2014	Indian Television Academy Awards	GR8! Onscreen Couple of the Year (With Divyanka Tripathi)	Yeh Hai Mohabbatein	Won	
2014	Indian Telly Awards	Best Onscreen Couple (With Divyanka Tripathi)	Yeh Hai Mohabbatein	Won	
2014	Gold Awards	Best Actor (Popular)	Yeh Hai Mohabbatein	Won	
2015	Indian Television Academy Awards	Best Actor (Jury)	Yeh Hai Mohabbatein	Won	
2015	Indian Television Academy Awards	Best Romantic Actor (Male)	Yeh Hai Mohabbatein	Won	
2015	Indian Telly Awards	Best Actor in a Lead Role	Yeh Hai Mohabbatein	Won	
2015	Indian Telly Awards	Best Jodi (With Divyanka Tripathi)	Yeh Hai Mohabbatein	Won	
2015	Gold Awards	Best Actor (Popular)	Yeh Hai Mohabbatein	Won	
2016	Gold Awards	Best Actor (Popular)	Yeh Hai Mohabbatein	Won	
2017	Gold Awards	Best Actor in a Lead Role	Yeh Hai Mohabbatein	Won	
2018	Gold Awards	Most Celebrated Actor (Male)	Yeh Hai Mohabbatein	Won	

== Personal life ==
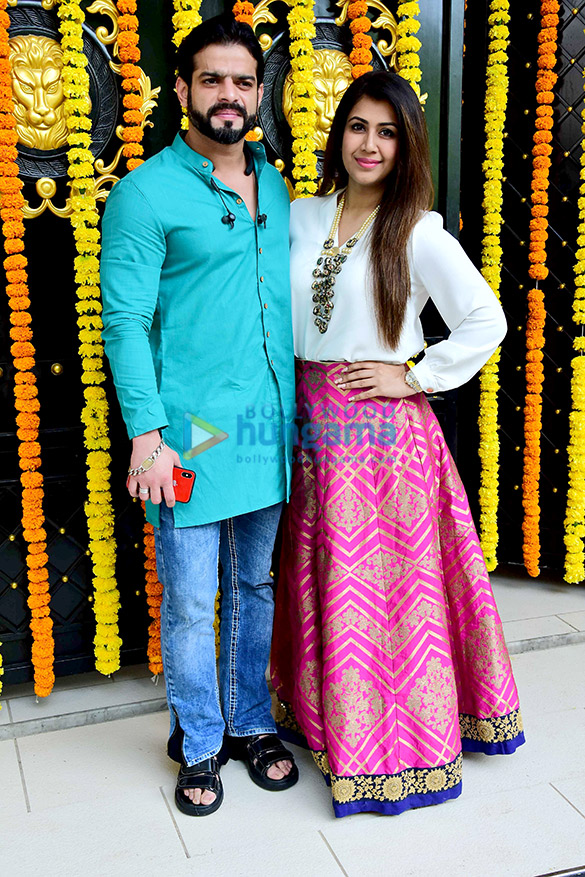
Karan Patel with his wife Ankita Bhargava Patel

Patel married Ankita Bhargava Patel on 3 May 2015 in Mumbai. Their first child was born on 14 December 2019.

== See also ==
- List of Indian television actors
