= Ladies vs Gentlemen =

Indian Hindi-language interactive game show

- Show poster
- Genre: Game show
- Written by: Varun Garg aka Sahib
- Directed by: Amit Puri; Khuzema Haveliwala
- Presented by: Riteish Deshmukh; Genelia Deshmukh
- Country of origin: India
- Original language: Hindi
- No. of seasons: 2
- No. of episodes: 30

Production
- Producer: Partha Thakur
- Production location: India
- Running time: 20 minutes
- Production company: Banijay Asia

Original release
- Release: 18 November 2020 – 26 October 2021

Ladies vs Gentlemen is an Indian opinion based poll game show hosted by Bollywood actors Riteish Deshmukh and Genelia Deshmukh. It was originally launched on 18 November 2020. It is an original series of Flipkart Video that stands men and women against each other to guess the opinion of India. The first season concluded with 30 episodes and had featured celebrity guests Rithvik Dhanjani, Tejasswi Prakash, Karan Kundrra, Bani Judge, Rashami Desai, Nia Sharma, Paras Chhabra, and Karan Wahi. The second season of the show was recently premiered on 16 October 2021 on the Flipkart app.

== Overview ==
Ladies vs Gentlemen is a daily poll-based show, where opinion makers wrestle out some of the most debated questions about Men vs Women. The show is hosted by Riteish Deshmukh alongside Genelia D'Souza and joined by the opinion-makers/panelists. In every episode, the contestants are asked a Poll Question and asked to provide a whole percentage number that most closely approximates the exact survey poll answer for the question. Riteish and Genelia then reveal the answers submitted by the contestants and the debate begins. If the contestant guesses the correct answer in accordance with the collective opinion of India, they get awarded at the end of each episode.

== Season 1 ==
=== Hosts ===
- Riteish Deshmukh
- Genelia D'Souza

=== Panelists ===
- Tejasswi Prakash
- Karan Kundrra
- Rashami Desai
- Paras Chhabra
- Bani J
- Karan Wahi
- Vikas Gupta
- Rithvik Dhanjani
- Nia Sharma

== Season 2 ==
- Jay Bhanushali
- Vishal Aditya Singh
- Prince Narula
- Kamya Panjabi
- Nia Sharma
- Devoleena Bhattacharjee
- Jasmin Bhasin
- Karan Kundrra
- Karishma Tanna
- Terence Lewis
- Asha Negi

== Production ==
The official teaser of Ladies vs Gentlemen was released on 6 November 2020, on the official YouTube of Flipkart and following which, the official promo was launched featuring Riteish, Genelia, Karan Kundra, VJ Bani, Rithvik Dhanjani, Karan Wahi, Paras Chhabra, Tejasswi Prakash, Nia Sharma, and Rashami Desai.
