= Tashan-e-Ishq =

Indian television series

- Genre: Drama romance
- Created by: Essel Vision Productions
- Written by: Vandana Tiwari; Sudhir Kumar Singh; Divyana Khanna; Dialogues: Harneet Singh
- Screenplay by: Gitangshsu Dey
- Story by: Sonali Jafar; Gitangshu Dey
- Directed by: Santram Varma; Hemant N Mishra
- Starring: Jasmin Bhasin; Sidhant Gupta; Zain Imam
- Opening theme: Tashan - e - Ishq
- Country of origin: India
- Original language: Hindi
- No. of seasons: 1
- No. of episodes: 322

Production
- Producers: Subhash Chandra; Nitin Keni
- Production locations: Punjab; Mumbai
- Running time: 22 minutes
- Production company: Essel Vision Productions

Original release
- Network: Zee TV
- Release: 10 August 2015 – 16 September 2016

Tashan-E-Ishq (transl. Love with Attitude) is an Indian romantic drama television series created by Subhash Chandra under Essel Vision Productions aired from 10 August 2015 to 16 September 2016.

The series starred Sidhant Gupta as Kunj Sarna, Jasmin Bhasin as Twinkle Taneja and Zain Imam as Yuvraj "Yuvi" Luthra. Set in the backdrop of Punjab, it revolved around their lives and relationship of love, hatred, betrayal and obsession.

== Plot ==
Twinkle Taneja and Yuvraj Luthra madly fall in love. Their respective mothers Leela Taneja and Anita Luthra, are rivals. During a fight between Leela and Anita, Leela challenges her that she will get a wedding alliance for Twinkle in 5 days. Twinkle is upset and meets Yuvraj, he suggests that they should elope. Leela wants Twinkle to marry another guy Kunj Sarna, so Manohar Sarna and Leela Taneja meet for their kid's alliance.

Twinkle packs her bag and has made her mind up to leave her home and run away with Yuvraj. She then realizes that she was being selfish, and if she had gone further with the plan it would hurt her mother, whom she loves, and she decides not to elope with Yuvi. Yuvraj is very angry with her decision and breaks up with her. Twinkle's alliance is fixed with Kunj Sarna. She decides to sort it out with Yuvi but they get into an argument.

Manohar meets Kunj and scolds him for not being at the home during the party. Manohar is a short-tempered person and a dominating husband he is also very religious. Kunj's mother dislikes Twinkle as they had a bad interaction the first time they met and got into a misunderstanding.

Yuvi is upset at seeing Kunj and Twinkle together at the party. Yuvi and Twinkle patch up. Kunj pretends to be a cheap and characterless boy so he drives Twinkle away as he is in love with Alisha. Twinkle tells her mother how Kunj is a creep but Leela refuses to believe her. Everyone proceeds with the Roka, this makes Yuvi angry.

Twinkle, Kunj, and Yuvraj have their plan to break the Roka but all of them fail in stopping the Roka. The next day Manohar scolds Usha(Kunj's mother) and Kunj for what happened on the Roka. Kunj drives his bike in anger and Yuvi follows him. They eventually get into a fight but Twinkle arrives disrupting the fight. Three of them reveal that none of them want this marriage.

They then decide to tell their families about their decision. They fail to express their feelings when their wedding date is being fixed. Yuvraj vows that he will not let Twinkle go and says that he will make Twinkle his no matter what.

Twinkle and Kunj make a deal that they will be together for 3 months and then they will go on their separate ways. Yuvi is on and off about this plan as he doesn't trust Kunj. Alisha is appointed as the wedding planner for Kunj-Twinkle's wedding. She initially denies having feelings for Kunj to Twinkle. She has an ulterior motive to have Kunj all to herself, which means that she wants him to leave his family because she doesn't want to share Kunj or his wealth with anyone.

As the engagement day comes, Twinkle, Kunj, and Yuvraj worry. Later, it is revealed that Yuvraj is faking love and wants to destroy Twinkle to take revenge on Leela for Anita. Twinkle is engaged with Kunj. Twinkle exposes Alisha to Kunj. Yuvraj plans to stop the wedding he crosses all the limits but fails each time. Twinkle marries Kunj. A guilty Twinkle decides to tell her mother the truth.

Leela is very upset to know about Twinkle's confession. Anita and Yuvraj brainwash Leela against Twinkle. When Twinkle confronts her mother, she faces her mother's rage. Kunj reaches the scene and tries to handle the situation but Leela asks Kunj to take Twinkle away.

Ishaan goes missing and Twinkle is blamed. Twinkle goes to Yuvraj to question him about the kidnapping. Twinkle and Kunj learn that it wasn't him who kidnapped Ishaan. The Sarnas learn that Ishaan was kidnapped because of the loan taken by Manohar. The Sarna's now face a financial crisis. Twinkle goes missing but is it later revealed that she fainted doing Parikrama and has dengue so she is admitted to the hospital.

Kunj cares for Twinkle which upsets Usha. Manohar's brother and mother come to live with them. Surjeet falls in love with Anita and decides to marry her even when everyone opposed this alliance. Kunj and Twinkle decide to stop this marriage but they fail. They are sent to Goa for their honeymoon, Yuvraj follows them and has an altercation with Kunj.

Yuvraj realizes he is really in love with Twinkle now. Yuvraj tries to create problems in Twinkle's life and kill Kunj. Twinkle and Kunj fall in love and want a happy life. But Yuvraj remains a threat to them and keeps interfering in their lives. Drawing strength from each other, Kunj and Twinkle fight Yuvraj's all intentions.

Things take a turn when Twinkle saves his life when he falls into his trap of killing her. Yuvraj changes the heart. Owing to hatred for Leela, Anita tries to ruin Twinkle's life by murdering Kunj. She gets him a shot. Kunj is missing and presumed dead. It is later revealed that he never died and was saved by a fisherman. Assuming Kunj is dead, Twinkle is shattered. After a few months, she finds out she is pregnant with Kunj's child. Her family gets her married to Yuvraj fakely as he has changed, but Twinkle continues to love Kunj.

=== 5 years later ===
Twinkle has suffered miscarriage and still lives with Yuvraj, unaware of his unconditional love for her. Kunj assumes the name Rocky Singh and is a successful boxer. Twinkle and Yuvraj suspect that Rocky might be Kunj. Kunj makes a fake MMS of Twinkle seducing him before she finally confronts him and narrates her sorrows after he presumably died. She tells him about her miscarriage, why she married Yuvraj, and their marriage is fake. Kunj breaks down and tries to win Twinkle's trust back. She is confused as she develops feelings for Yuvraj too and doesn’t want to leave him midway. She now spends some time alone, flees to Mussoorie, and meets a carefree Sonia. Kunj and Yuvraj follow Twinkle, individually trying to win her heart. She decides to study further and demands some space. Yuvraj protectively keeps an eye on Twinkle so that she doesn’t get into any problem. Kunj gets admission into the college as a coach. Yuvraj disguises himself as Jassi and befriends Twinkle to stay close to her as he fears losing her more than ever because this time, his love was pure and more selfless than the last time. As luck has it, Twinkle and Kunj get closer which Yuvraj and Pallavi are unlike. Out of jealousy and his immense love for twinkle, Yuvraj begins plotting against Kunj and tries to instigate Twinkle against him. She professes her belief in Kunj, upsetting Yuvraj further. After many difficulties, Kunj and Twinkle decide to remarry, upsetting Pallavi and Yuvraj. Pallavi pretends to commit suicide to stop the wedding but is killed by her servants for money. Twinkle and Kunj are blamed for the murder, but Yuvraj and a girl named Simple Singh work to prove the couple's innocence and fall in love. The show ends with Kunj-Twinkle and Yuvraj-Simple's marriage and thus ends the saga of Yuvraj and Twinkle’s Tashan-e-Ishq though they end up with different people.

== Cast ==
=== Main ===
- Jasmin Bhasin as Twinkle Taneja Sarna: Leela and Raminder's elder daughter; Mahi's sister; Yuvraj's ex-wife; Kunj's wife (2015–2016)
- Sidhant Gupta as Kunj Sarna: Usha and Manohar's elder son; Anand's brother; Cherry's cousin; Twinkle's husband (2015–2016)
  - Naman Shaw replaced Gupta as Kunj (2016)
- Zain Imam as Yuvraj "Yuvi" Luthra: Anita and Akshay's son; Surjeet's step-son; Cherry's step-brother; Mahi and Twinkle's ex-husband; Simple's husband (2015–2016)

=== Recurring ===
- Vaishnavi Mahant as Leela Oberoi Taneja: Raman's sister; Raminder's wife; Twinkle and Mahi's mother (2015–2016)
- Eva Grover / Anjali Mukhi as Anita Raichand Sarna: Akshay's widow; Surjeet's wife; Yuvi's mother; Cherry's step-mother (2015–2016)
- Tanushree Kaushal as Nirmala "Bebe" Sarna: Surjeet and Manohar's sister; Kunj, Anand and Cherry's aunt (2015–2016)
- Aditi Bhatia as Babli Oberoi Taneja: Raman and Pinni's daughter; Twinkle and Mahi's cousin (2015)
- Deepika Amin as Usha Sarna: Manohar's wife; Kunj and Anand's mother; Nikki and Twinkle's mother-in-law (2015–2016)
- Bobby Parvez as Manohar Sarna: Nirmala and Surjeet's brother; Usha's husband; Kunj and Anand's father; Nikki and Twinkle's father-in-law (2015–2016)
- Jatin Sial as Raminder "RT" Taneja: Leela's husband, Twinkle and Mahi's father (2015–2016)
- Shritama Mukherjee as Mahi Taneja/Devika Khanna (née Luthra): Leela and Raminder's younger daughter; Twinkle's elder sister; Yuvraj's former wife
- Neha Narang as Simple Yuvraj Luthra (née Singh): Yuvraj's wife (2016)
- Nasirr Khan as Surjeet Sarna: Nirmala and Manohar's brother; Anokhi's ex-husband; Anita's second husband; Cherry's father; Yuvi's step-father (2015–2016)
- Sonika Chopra as Pinni Oberoi: Raman's wife; Babli's mother (2015–2016)
- Ashwin Kaushal as Raman Oberoi: Leela's brother; Pinni's husband; Babli's father (2015–2016)
- Vishal Gupta as Anand Sarna: Usha and Manohar's younger son; Kunj's brother; Cherry's cousin; Nikki's husband (2015–2016)
- Rishina Kandhari as Nikki Sarna: Anand's wife (2015)
- Raj Singh as Cherry Sarna: Anokhi and Surjeet's son; Anita's step-son; Yuvi's step-brother; Kunj and Anand's cousin (2016)
- Simran Sharma as Chinki: Twinkle and Yuvi's best friend (2015-2016)
- Anannya Kolvankar as Prisha (2015–16)
- Ram Sethi as Suryendra alias Nanaji: Preeto's husband (2015)
- Beena Banerjee as Preeto: owner of Ms. Amritsar, Suryendra's wife (2015)
- Sonica D'Souza as Alisha (2015)
- Abhilash Chaudhary as Rocky Singh: Kunj's manager and friend (2016)
- Ajit Singh Hada as Sonu Oberoi: Babli Oberoi's brother (2016)
- Apoorv Singh as Sunny Bhalla (2015)
- Charu Asopa as Dr. Pallavi Chaddha: Kunj's friend (2016)
- Priya Shinde as Maya: Kunj's best friend and Yuvraj's wife (2016)
- Samir Harhash as Yuvraj Singh Pratap: Maya's husband (2016)

=== Guest appearances ===
- Nia Sharma and Ravi Dubey (2016) as Siddharth and Roshni Khurana from Jamai Raja, Siddharth attended all the rituals of Twinkle and Kunj's wedding, he saved Kunj from Yuvi's plan.
- Aashish Kaul as Dr. Akshay Luthra: Anita's former husband, Yuvi's father (Episode:51) (2015)
- Mika Singh as Ms. Amritsar Judge (2015)
- Shah Rukh Khan, Kajol, Varun Dhawan, Kriti Sanon to promote Dilwale (2015)
- Mouni Roy for dance performance in New Year party (2015)
- Sanjeeda Sheikh and Aamir Ali for dance performance in Twinkle and Kunj's one of the wedding ceremonies (2016)
- Sukirti Kandpal as Rajjo (2016)

== Awards ==
Year	Award	Category	Nominee	Result
2016	Gold Awards	Best Actor In Negative Role Male (Critics)	Zain Imam	Won
2016	Gold Awards	Best Debut Female	Jasmin Bhasin	Won
2016	Gold Awards	Best Debut Male	Sidhant Gupta	Nominated
2016	Gold Awards	Most Popular Jodi	Sidhant Gupta and Jasmin Bhasin	Nominated

== Soundtrack ==
The soundtrack of the show consists of two songs. The first song is named "Tashan E Ishq" (title song of the show) and is sung by Arpita Chakraborty showing Yuvi and Twinkle Love story . The second song "Sajna Ve" is sung by Mamta Raut, Rahul Pandit and Altamash Faridi.

No.	Title	Singer(s)	Length
1.	"Tashan E Ishq"	Arpita Chakraborty	3:53
2.	"Sajna Ve"	Mamta Raut, Rahul Pandit and Altamash Faridi	5:13
