= Khatron Ke Khiladi 11 =

Indian reality and stunt television series

Fear Factor: Khatron Ke Khiladi
- Season 11
- Title screen
- Presented by: Rohit Shetty
- No. of contestants: 13
- Winner: Arjun Bijlani
- Runner-up: Divyanka Tripathi
- No. of episodes: 22

Release
- Original network: Colors TV
- Original release: 17 July – 26 September 2021

Season chronology
- ← Previous; Made in India Next → Season 12

Fear Factor: Khatron Ke Khiladi, Darr vs Dare is the eleventh season of Fear Factor: Khatron Ke Khiladi, an Indian reality and stunt television series produced by Endemol Shine India. The show aired from 17 July to 26 September 2021, on Colors TV. Filmed in Cape Town, South Africa, it was hosted by Rohit Shetty. Arjun Bijlani emerged as winner of this season while Divyanka Tripathi became the 1st runner up.

== Contestants ==
Contestant	Occupation	Status	Place
Arjun Bijlani	Actor	Winner (Week 10)	1st
Divyanka Tripathi	Actress	1st runner-up (Week 10)	2nd
Vishal Aditya Singh	Actor	Eliminated (Week 6)	3rd
Vishal Aditya Singh	Actor	2nd runner-up (Week 10)	3rd
Varun Sood	Actor	3rd runner up (Week 10)	4th
Shweta Tiwari	Actress	4th Runner-Up (Week 10)	5th
Rahul Vaidya	Singer	Finalist (Week 10)	6th
Sana Makbul	Actress	Eliminated (Week 9)	7th
Abhinav Shukla	Actor	Eliminated (Week 9)	8th
Anushka Sen	Actress	Eliminated (Week 7)	9th
Nikki Tamboli	Actress	Eliminated (Week 1)	10th
Nikki Tamboli	Actress	Eliminated (Week 6)	10th
Mahek Chahal	Actress	Eliminated (Week 5)	11th
Aastha Gill	Singer	Eliminated (Week 4)	12th
Sourabh Raaj Jain	Actor	Eliminated (Week 3)	13th

== Elimination chart ==
	Weeks																																														
	1			2				3			4								5			6				7						8						9					10				
	Grand Premiere			K Medal Race				Aatyachar Week			Team Week								Best of StuntWeek			Partner Week^{4}				Rohit Shetty's Dil Ki Bhadas Special^{5}						Ticket To Finale Week						Semi Finale Week					Grand Finale Weekend				
	17, 18 July			24-25 July				31 July, 1 August			7, 8 August								14, 15 August			21 August		22 August		28, 29 August						4 Sep		5 September				11 Sept		12 September			25 September		26 September		
Arjun	WIN			WIN	WIN	WIN	K MEDAL	LOST	BTM3	Used K Medal	TEAN RAHUL	WIN	N/A	N/A	TEAM WIN (60 Pts.)				WIN			Rahul	LOST	Shweta		LOST	LOST	LOST	LOST	BTM3	SAFE	WIN		FAIL	N/A			WIN		WIN	Finalist		WIN		WIN	WIN	Winner
Divyanka	WIN			FAIL	N/A			WIN			TEAM SHWETA	LOST	LOST	N/A	TEAM LOST (10 Pts.)	BTM6	SAVED		WIN			Varun	WIN	SAFE		LOST	LOST	LOST	WIN	SAFE		WIN		WIN	WIN	WIN	TOF	Ticket to Finale					WIN		WIN	LOST	1st Runner Up
Vishal	LOST	BTM2	SAFE	WIN	WIN	FAIL	N/A	LOST	SAFE		TEAM RAHUL	WIN	WIN	N/A	TEAM WIN (60 Pts.)				WIN			Shweta	WIN	Nikki	ELIMINATED	WIN	SAFE					WIN		FAIL	N/A			BTM3	SAFE	WIN^{6}	Finalist		WIN		WIN	LOST	2nd Runner Up
Varun	WIN			FAIL	N/A			WIN			TEAM RAHUL	WIN	N/A	WIN	TEAM WIN (60 Pts.)				LOST		SAFE^{3}	Divyanka	WIN	SAFE		LOST	LOST	LOST	LOST	BTM3	SAFE	FAIL	WIN	WIN	FAIL	N/A		WIN		BTM3	SAFE	Finalist	WIN		LOST	ELIMINATED	
Shweta	WIN			WIN	FAIL	N/A		WIN			TEAM CAPTAIN^{2}	LOST	N/A	LOST	TEAM LOST (10 Pts.)	BTM6	SAVED		LOST		SAFE	Vishal	WIN	Arjun		LOST	LOST	WIN	SAFE			FAIL	FAIL	N/A				BTM3	SAFE	BTM3	SAFE	Finalist	BTM2	SAFE	LOST	ELIMINATED	
Rahul	LOST	SAFE		FAIL	N/A			LOST	SAFE		TEAM CAPTAIN^{2}	WIN	N/A	WIN	TEAM WIN (60 Pts.)				WIN			Arjun	LOST	Abhinav		LOST	WIN	SAFE				FAIL	WIN	WIN	WIN	FAIL		WIN		WIN	Finalist		BTM2	ELIMINATED			
Sana	LOST	SAFE		FAIL	N/A			WIN			TEAM SHWETA	LOST	N/A	N/A	TEAM LOST (10 Pts.)	BTM6	SAVED		WIN			Nikki	LOST	Anushka		WIN	SAFE					FAIL	FAIL	N/A				WIN		BTM3	ELIMINATED						
Abhinav	WIN			FAIL	N/A			WIN			TEAM SHWETA	LOST	N/A	LOST	TEAM LOST (10 Pts.)	BTM6	BTM2	SAFE	LOST		SAFE	Anushka	LOST	Rahul		LOST	LOST	LOST	WIN	SAFE		WIN		WIN	FAIL	N/A		BTM3	ELIMINATED								
Anushka	LOST	SAFE		FAIL	N/A			LOST	BTM3	SAFE	TEAM SHWETA	LOST	WIN	N/A	TEAM LOST (10 Pts.)	BTM6	SAVED		LOST	BTM2	SAFE	Abhinav	LOST	Sana		LOST	LOST	LOST	LOST	BTM3	ELIMINATED																
Nikki	LOST	BTM2	ELIMINATED					WIN			TEAM RAHUL	WIN	LOST	N/A	TEAM WIN (60 Pts.)				LOST		SAFE	Sana	LOST	Vishal	ELIMINATED																						
Mahek	WIN			FAIL	N/A			LOST	BTM3	SAFE	TEAM RAHUL	WIN	N/A	N/A	TEAM WIN (60 Pts.)				LOST	BTM2	ELIMINATED																										
Aastha	WIN			WIN	FAIL	N/A		LOST	SAFE		TEAM SHWETA	LOST	N/A	N/A	TEAM LOST (10 Pts.)	BTM6	BTM2	ELIMINATED																													
Sourabh	WIN			WIN	FAIL	N/A		WIN	BTM3^{1}	ELIMINATED																																					

1. Nominated By Arjun Using K Medal
2. Captain of respective team: Team Rahul Team Shweta
3. Vishal Proxies Varun due to injury
4. Pairs during Partner Week
5. All contestants received Fear Funda performed stunts together
6. Varun Proxies Vishal due to injury
7. No Stunts performed

Winner
1st runner-up
2nd runner-up
Finalists
Ticket to finale
The contestant won the stunt.
The contestant lost the stunt and received Fear Funda.
The contestant got rid of Fear Funda by winning pre-elimination stunt.
The contestant was placed in the bottom and performed elimination stunt
The contestant was safe from elimination by winning elimination stunt.
The contestant was eliminated
The contestant was exempted from performing stunts in the entire week
The contestant lost the K Medal/Ticket to Finale Race
Injury

== Crossover ==
Finalists of this season and host Rohit Shetty appeared on Dance Deewane 3 in an episode named as Mahasangam. The episodes was aired on 18–19 September 2021.

== Guest appearances ==
Week(s)	Episode(s)	Guest(s)	Note(s)
Week 1	Episode 1	Rubina Dilaik	To support Abhinav Shukla
Week 1	Episode 1	Palak Tiwari	To support Shweta Tiwari
Week 1	Episode 1	Badshah	To support Aastha Gill
Week 4	Episode 8	Aly Goni	Video Chat
Week 5	Episode 9 & 10	Bharti Singh and Haarsh Limbachiyaa	Video Message
Week 5	Episode 9 & 10	Karan Patel	Stunt Experience
Week 5	Episode 9 & 10	Rithvik Dhanjani	Stunt Experience
Week 5	Episode 9 & 10	Aditya Narayan	Stunt Experience
Week 5	Episode 9 & 10	Punit Pathak	Stunt Experience
Week 9	Episode 18	Vivek Dahiya; Nia Sharma; Disha Parmar; Palak Tiwari	Family Video Call
Week 10	Episode 19 & 20	Madhuri Dixit; Tushar Kalia; Dharmesh Yelande; Bharti Singh; Haarsh Limbachiyaa and contestants of Dance Deewane 3	Mahasangam with Dance Deewane 3
Week 10	Episode 20	Neha Kakkar; Tony Kakkar and Yo Yo Honey Singh	To promote the song Kanta LagaLaga
Week 11	Episode 22	Ranveer Singh (via Advertisement)	To promote The Big Picture
