= Laughter Chefs – Unlimited Entertainment =

Indian cookery series

- Genre: Cooking; Comedy
- Based on: Cooku with Comali
- Written by: Dialogues: Vankush Arora
- Presented by: Bharti Singh
- Judges: Harpal Singh Sokhi
- Country of origin: India
- Original language: Hindi
- No. of seasons: 3
- No. of episodes: 162

Production
- Producer: Vipul D. Shah
- Camera setup: Multi-camera
- Running time: 48–114 minutes
- Production company: Optimystix Entertainment

Original release
- Network: Colors TV; JioHotstar
- Release: 1 June 2024 – 26 July 2026

Laughter Chefs – Unlimited Entertainment is an Indian competitive cooking-comedy reality series loosely based on Cooku with Comali. Produced by Optimystix Entertainment, it premiered on Colors TV on 1 June 2024. The series is hosted by Bharti Singh and judged by Harpal Singh Sokhi. The show is also digitally available on JioHotstar.

== Series overview ==
Series	Episodes	Originally released	
Series	Episodes	First released	Last released
1	36	1 June 2024	4 October 2024
2	54	25 January 2025	27 July 2025
3	72	22 November 2025	26 July 2026

== Season 1 ==
The first season premiered on Colors TV on 1 June 2024 hosted by Bharti Singh and judged by Harpal Singh Sokhi. It concluded on 4 October 2024 and streams digitally on JioHotstar.

=== Format ===
It features participants cooking dishes with particular criteria assigned by celebrity chef Harpal Singh Sokhi who judges the dishes alongside Bharti Singh. The pair or pairs with the most accurate delicacy receive stars. At the end of each weekly episode, the pair who received the most stars become the "Laughter Chefs of the Week." However, this concept was discontinued from Week 8.

=== Participants ===
- Ankita Lokhande and Vicky Jain
- Aly Goni and Rahul Vaidya
- Arjun Bijlani and Karan Kundrra
- Jannat Zubair Rahmani and Reem Shaikh
- Kashmera Shah and Krushna Abhishek
- Nia Sharma and Sudesh Lehri

=== Weekly summary ===
Episodes	Week 1				Week 2				Week 3				Week 4				Week 5				Week 6				Week 7			Week 8			Week 9		Week 10		Week 11			Week 12		Week 13		Week 14			Week 15		Week 16		Week 17		Week 18		Stars Received
Episodes	Grand Premiere 1		Grand Premiere 2		Desi Khana Special		Chinese Cuisine Special		Suhagraat / Pehli Rasoi Special		Kids Special		Bollywood Special		Shahi Daawat Special		Anna Special		Family Special		Adla Badli Special 1		Adla Badli Special 2		Shaadi Special	Genie Special		Orry Special		Khatron Ke Khiladi Special	Dharmendra Special	Birthday Special	Boys vs. Girls Special	Shraddha Kapoor Special	Tel Tel Mein vs Khel Khel Mein		Stand-up Comedy Special	Raksha Bandhan Special	Janmashtami Special	Yaadon Ki Baarat Special	Media Special	Laughter Chefs Junction	Ganesh Chaturthi Special		Adla Badli Special 3	Birthday Special	Atrangi Nautanki Special	Karaoke Night Special	JZ ke Rockstars vs Gulabi Faloode	Laughter Chefs Memories Special	Navratri Special 1	Navratri Special 2	Stars Received
Laughter Chefs of the Week	Ankita & Vicky				Arjun & Karan				Aly & Rahul				Arjun & Karan				Nia & Sudesh				Not Awarded				Krushna & Kashmera			Discontinued																									Stars Received
Recipes	Jalebi	Samosa	Laddoo	Momos	Plain Dosa	Litti Chokha	Cake Decoration	Veg Noodles Manchurian	Masala Doodh Rasmalai	Rumali Roti Veg Seekh Kabab	Chocolate Mousse Choco Bowls	Kathal Patty Buns Potato Twisters	Innovative Pani-puri	Pizza	Shahi Fal Barfi	Shahi Pulao Shahi Veg Korma	Medu Vada Sambhar	Arisi Murukku	Chole Bhature	Gujiya	Champakali Nimki Tandoori Chai	Paratha Pyaaz Achaar	Pasta Tortellini Farfalle	Croissant	Phool Kachori; Saunt Chutney Parda Biryani Ghevar; Rose-flavoured Rabri	Green Thai Curry	Chidiya Ka Ghosla	Zucchini Mushroom Brownie	Bharwa Mirchi Salan Khoba Roti	Cactus Stuffed Cheeze Fry Roll / Food Custard In Glass / Paneer Steak & Stir-Fry Vegetables	Curry Pakoda / Makki Ki Roti; Sarso Ka Saag / Methi Matar Malai; Fulka Roti	Cheesy Pav Bhaji Barf Gola	Vrat Thali: Kuttu Puri, Singadha Sabzi, Makhana Raayta, Naariyal Laddu, Sabudana Katori Chaat	Vada Pav Missal Pav	Thai Noodles	Chocolate Paratha	Veg Sizzler	Edible Rakhi	Krishna Bhog (Makhan Mishri, Kalakand and Panjiri)	Black & White Rice Sushi Sushi essentials	Mirchi Halwa Pockets	Bharwa Karela Thepla	Alu Vadi Thecha	Ukadichi Modak	Nadir Yakhin Noon Chai	Upside-down Pineapple Cake Rose Potato Chips	Atrangi Rang Birangi Idli Kulfi Arhar Dal Sajjan Fali Rasam Coconut Milkshake	Rajasthani Govind Gatte Tandoori Roti	Salad: Watermelon Ship; Orange Cat Main Course: Hariyali Aloo Nazakat Dessert: Son Papdi	Khow Suey	Khandvi Piyush	Mushroom Fillings Cheesy Tacos Churros	Stars Received
Aly & Rahul																					(Aly & Reem)				(Starters) (Team Ladkewale)								Team; Naagin		Team Khel; Khel Mein										(Aly & Kashmera)		(Mimicry)						×17
Arjun & Karan																						(Karan & Krushna)		(Karan & Reem)	(Dessert) (Team Ladkewale)					(vs. Shilpa, Aly & Rahul)			Team; Naagin		Team Khel; Khel Mein																		×16
Ankita & Vicky																														(vs. Krishna Krushna, & Kashmera)			Team; Naagin		Team Khel; Khel Mein		(Ankita; Stand-up Comedy)										(Mimicry)						×14
Krushna & Kashmera																						(Karan & Krushna)	(Krushna & Nia)		(Main Course) (Team Ladkewale)						(vs. Arjun & Karan)		Team; Naagin		Team Khel; Khel Mein										(Aly & Kashmera)								×14
Jannat & Reem																					(Aly & Reem)			(Karan & Reem)						(vs. Shalin, Nia & Sudesh)	(vs. Aly & Rahul)		Team; Naagin		Team Khel; Khel Mein																		×13
Nia & Sudesh																							(Krushna & Nia)								(vs. Ankita & Vicky)		Team; Naagin		Team Khel; Khel Mein		(Nia; Stand-up Comedy)										(Mimicry)	(Karaoke)					×9
Notes					1														2							3	4	5, 6		5, 7			8		9		10			11	12	13					14	15	16	17	18	18, 19	

==== Notes ====
- ^1: Participants had to use desi kitchen utensils.
- ^2: During each round, family member of one of the participant assisted.
- ^3: Genie, that is friends of participants assisted them in cooking.
- ^4: In round two, Genie and one of the participant competed.
- ^5: Reem was absent and was replaced by Faisal.
- ^6: In round two, Orry assisted Nia and Sudesh in cooking after they bid highest for him.
- ^7: Fear Factor: Khatron Ke Khiladi 14 contestants assisted participants in a verses round.
- ^8: Girls and Boys competed against each other as team 'Naagin' and 'Sapera' respectively, No stars awarded.
- ^9: The star cast of Khel Khel Mein competed against participants in a team rounds, with the teams named 'Khel Khel Mein' and 'Tel Tel Mein' respectively.
- ^10: Participants also performed stand-up comedy during the cooking.
- ^11: Arjun was not present.
- ^12: Arjun was absent and was replaced by Faisal.
- ^13: Aly was absent and was replaced by Faisal.
- ^14: Participants also performed mimicry during the cooking.
- ^15: Participants also performed Karaoke during the cooking.
- ^16: Participants competed against each other in a team round, with teams led by Ankita and Jannat, named 'Gulabi Faloode' and 'JZ Ke Rockstars,' respectively.
- ^17: Reem and Sudesh got injured during the cooking and skit activities, respectively, and were not present.
- ^18: Rahul was absent and was replaced by Munawar.
- ^19: The final episode ended on a cliffhanger.

== Season 2 ==
The second season premiered on Colors TV on 25 January 2025 hosted by Bharti Singh and judged by Harpal Singh Sokhi. It concluded on 27 July 2025 and streams digitally on JioHotstar.

The second season was won by Elvish Yadav and Karan Kundrra, with Aly Goni and Reem Sheikh finishing second.

=== Format ===
It features participants cooking dishes with particular criteria assigned by celebrity chef Harpal Singh Sokhi who judges the dishes alongside Bharti Singh. The pair or pairs with the most accurate delicacy receive stars. Towards the end of the season, several twists were introduced to win even more stars.

=== Participants ===
- Abhishek Kumar and Samarth Jurel
- Abdu Rozik / Karan Kundrra (Note: Abdu quit the show for Ramadan in episode 17 and was replaced by Karan.) and Elvish Yadav
- Ankita Lokhande and Vicky Jain
- Kashmera Shah and Krushna Abhishek
- Mannara Chopra / Nia Sharma (Note: Mannara quit the show due to prior work commitments in episode 25 and was replaced by Nia.) and Sudesh Lehri
- Rahul Vaidya and Rubina Dilaik
- Aly Goni and Reem Shaikh (Note: Aly & Reem entered as wildcards in episode 25.)

=== Weekly summary ===
Episodes	Week 1				Week 2				Week 3				Week 4				Week 5				Week 6			Week 7				Week 8				Week 9				Week 10				Week 11				Week 12				Week 13				Week 14				Week 15				Week 16				Week 17				Week 18				Week 19				Week 20				Week 21				Week 22				Week 23				Week 24				Week 25				Week 26				Week 27			Stars Received
Episodes	Grand Premiere 1		Grand Premiere 2		3		4		Valentine Week Special		6		Beach Special		Laughter Chefs Dhaba Special		Mahashivratri Special		Team Elvish vs Team Abhishek		Bollywood Night Special		Laughter Chefs Circus Special	Women's Day Special		Holi Special		Adla Badli Special 1		Adla Badli Special 2		Bhola Is Back With A Bang		Bachpan Special		Groom Hunt For Mannara!		Team Indian Bhauji vs Team Western Bhauji		Padosi Sabzi Mandi Special		Ram Navami Special		Tasting Twist Special		Astrology Special		Wildcard Special		Chef Harpal Birthday Special		Kitty Party Special		Mango Special		World Laughter Day Special		Fashion Show Special		Summer Camp Special		Mother's Day Special		Desi Kitchen Special		Laughter Chef Airport Special		Bharti's Gang Special		Laughter Chef Breaking News Special		Krushna Birthday/Krushna and Kashmera Wedding Special		Laughter Chef One Year Anniversary Special		XXL Special		Adla Badli Special 3		Saas Bahu Special		Father’s Day Special		World Music Day Special		World Yoga Day Special		‘Metro...In Dino’ Special		Media Special		Bharti’s Birthday Special		Guru Purnima Special		Bengali Food Special		50th Episode Special		Semi Finale 1		Semi Finale 2		Grand Finale Party 1		Grand Finale Party 2	Stars Received
Recipes	Any Favourite Sweet Dish	Gajar Rolls	Burj Khalifa Dosa	Paneer Pasanda Multicoloured Roti	Rumali Papad Banta Soda Jaljeera	Maqluba Labneh	Gulkand Petha Paan	Lucknowi Tokri Chaat	Dilwale Rasgulle	Stuffed Bread Pakora Chutney	Rabdi Imarti	Stuffed Paratha Safed Makkhan	Popcorn Cotton Candy	Masala Pav	Pyaaz Kachori Lassi	Masala Bharva Bhindi	Motichoor Laddu	Vada Thandai	Dhokla Mathri Muthiya	Chole Bhature Punjabi Kadhi Pakoda Shankarpali	Baahubali Samosa	Judwa Momos	Biscuit Sugarcane Juice	Walnut Brownie Sizzler	Ravioli Caramelle Ai Funghi Con Crema Alfredo	Gulaal Gulaab	Dahi Gujiya	Fafda Chunda	Veg Anda Curry	Criss Cross Potato Designer Coffee	Kathal Naan Bombs	Caramel Custard	American Chopsuey	Monster Shake Cheeselings	Balloon Pizza	Heart Piñata Tiramisu	Patthar Wale Suran Shami Kebab	Khubani Sheer Korma Trifel Nafrat Ka Sharbat	Potli Yakhni Pulao Kachumbar Shahi Sheermal	Champakali Ke Phool Mitti wali Chai	Idiyappam Veg Stew	Zevar	Bedmi Puri Aloo ki Sabzi Ramphal Raita	Golgappe	Hara Bhara Bites	Donut Solar System	Dal Bati Churma	Phirni Noodles In Shahi Cone	Stuffed Paneer Manchurian Fried Rice	Lekin Ragda Pattice	Pad Kee Mao	Phus Phus Mexicano	Kunafa Gulab Jamun	Aam Ras Puri	Mango Cheese Cake	Cake's Cartoon Top	Pumpkin Gnocchi In Pesto Sauce	Panna Cotta In Choco Hand	Chilli Oil Rose Dumplings	Hot Dogs	Cheesy Spinach Corn Cups Hot Choco Bombs	Mysore Pak	Paneer Patiala Fulka Roti	Kothimbir Vadi	Doodh Sev Ki Sabzi	Babka Sangria Mocktail	Lebanese Platter Hummus Pita Bread Falafel	Dahi Ke Kebab	Isomalt Smoothie Bowl	Pista Malai Ghevar	Pitod Sabzi Colors Puri	Sev Barfi	Nool Paratha Dahi Mirchi Ke Tipore	Bakarwadi Croissant	Pull Me Up Rasmalai	Puran Poli	XXL Noodle Thupka	Sushi Spoons	Tandoori Soya Chaap	Stuffed Nashpati	Karare Rajma Chawal	Kaju Kalash	Bharli Vangi	Bandar Drumeshwar Ji	Dholak Swiss Roll	Gond Ke Laddu	Green Sandwich Watermelon Tap Juice	Bhajiya Platter	Lava Idli	Ice-cream	Paneer Shawarma Pockets	Aam Papad Chaat Roasted Aam Panna	Aloo Gobhi Khakhra Tacos	Stuffed Malpua Panchamrit	Kashiphal Sabzi Namkeen Puri	Mach Sondesh Kheer Kodom	Hibiscus Boba Tea Peanut Butter Chocolate Roll	Pineapple Halwa In Pineapple	Sichuan Potato Balls	Bhelpuri Paapdi Cone	Puttu Veg Ghassi	Sapodilla Meringue Cromboloni	Pizza Flower Pot	Candy Floss Lollipop Falooda	Stuffed Kukurmutta Crackers	Churro Chocolate Fountain	Stars Received
Elvish & Abdu / Karan																				(Shankarpali)								(Abdu & Krushna)	×2 (Abdu & Krushna) (Rubina & Elvish)																																																	(Elvish & Nia)																			×4						×7		×20		×51
Aly & Reem	Not in Competition																																															×8																														(Aly & Bharti)										(Aly, Reem, & Fatima)									×3					×5			×9		×38
Ankita & Vicky																				(Chole Bhature)											(Ankita & Rubina)																																																																		×2								×2		×21
Sudesh & Mannara / Nia																														(Samarth & Sudesh)																																																(Elvish & Nia)																			×0								×3		×19
Abhishek & Samarth																														(Samarth & Sudesh)																																																(Abhishek & Rubina)																			×5								×9		×18
Krushna & Kashmera	(Apple Kheer)																			(Punjabi Kadhi Pakoda)								(Abdu & Krushna)	(Abdu & Krushna)																																																																				×6								×2		×14
Rahul & Rubina																													(Rubina & Elvish)		(Ankita & Rubina)																																																(Abhishek & Rubina)										(Rubina & Jannat)	(Rubina & Jannat)							×24						×7		×5		×13
Notes	1				2				3										4																			5		6								7								8							9	10		10, 11	10	12										13		14				15, 16	16, 17			18, 19		18					20		21					22, 23	24, 25		26		27

==== Notes ====
- ^1: Participants were asked to cook their favourite sweet dish.
- ^2: Ankita was absent.
- ^3: No star were awarded.
- ^4: Participants competed against each other in a team round, with teams led by Elvish and Abhishek, named 'Team Elvish' and 'Team Abhishek,' respectively.
- ^5: Participants competed against each other in a team round, with teams led by Ankita and Rubina, named 'Team Indian Bhauji' and 'Team Western Bhauji,' respectively.
- ^6: No star were awarded.
- ^7: Aly & Reem received honorary ×8 stars upon entering as wildcards.
- ^8: Rahul was absent and was replaced by Jasmin.
- ^9: During the round, the mother of one of the participants assisted at a time.
- ^10: Karan was absent and was replaced by Rajat.
- ^11: No stars were awarded. However, Nia got a ‘Chef Shabashi’ for her ‘Sangria’.
- ^12: Elvish was absent and was replaced by Munawar.
- ^13: Ankita was absent and was replaced by host Bharti.
- ^14: Karan and Rahul were absent. Their partners, Elvish and Rubina, became partners.
- ^15: Elvish was absent.
- ^16: Vicky was absent and was replaced by Jannat.
- ^17: Elvish was absent and was replaced by Tejasswi.
- ^18: Rahul was absent and was replaced by Jannat.
- ^19: Metro...In Dino cast assisted the pairs in cooking Bhajiya Platter and picked the ingredients for the Lava Idli.
- ^20: In the round, Pairs competed in teams. Team A, Elvish & Karan, Ankita & Vikki, and Nia & Sudesh. Team B, Aly & Reem, Krushna & Kashmera, Abhishek & Samarth, and Rahul & Rubina.
- ^21: Pairs were given a chance to double their stars by putting their already won stars at stake. If they lose, the amount of stars put on stake will be deducted from the overall stars won.
- ^22: Divyanka Tripathi, Isha Malviya, Shraddha Arya, Devoleena Bhattacharjee, Eisha Singh assisted the bottom five pairs in cooking.
- ^23: In the round, five stars were awarded.
- ^24: Divyanka Tripathi, Isha Malviya, Shraddha Arya, Devoleena Bhattacharjee, Eisha Singh, Avika Gor and Milind Chandwani assisted the pairs in cooking.
- ^25: In the round, Seven stars were awarded.
- ^26: In the round, the live audience tasted the dish blindly and awarded their individual star to the pair.
- ^27: In the end, Elvish and Karan lifted the trophy, while Aly and Reem were awarded the Diamond Star.

=== Reception ===
Like the previous season, Season two also achieved success in terms of viewership and TRP rankings. It was ranked the No. 1 non-fiction show among all Hindi GEC shows during its run and consistently ranked among the top 10 most watched shows.

== Season 3 ==
The third season premiered on Colors TV on 22 November 2025 hosted by Bharti Singh and judged by Harpal Singh Sokhi. It concluded on 26 July 2026 and streams digitally on JioHotstar.

The first part of the third season was won by Team Kaanta – Aly Goni, Jannat Zubair, Krushna Abhishek, Kashmera Shah, Abhishek Kumar and Samarth Jurel.

The second part of the season was won by Aly Goni and Jannat Zubair, with Arjun Bijlani and Tejasswi Prakash, and Elvish Yadav and Karan Kundrra finishing runners-up.

=== Format ===
In the first part, participants cooking dishes divided into two teams, Team Chhuri and Team Kaanta with particular criteria assigned by celebrity chef Harpal Singh Sokhi who judges the dishes alongside Bharti Singh. The pair or pairs with the most accurate delicacy receive stars, and a star is also awarded to their team. In the season, the stars leaderboard were also introduced.

The second part of the season features participants cooking dishes with particular criteria assigned by celebrity chef Harpal Singh Sokhi who judges the dishes alongside Bharti Singh. The pair or pairs with the most accurate delicacy receive stars. Towards the end of the season, "Khatra" twists were introduced.

=== Participants ===
In first part, participants features in pairs in teams until episode 20.

Teams

- Team Kaanta: Abhishek Kumar, Samarth Jurel, Aly Goni, Jannat Zubair Rahmani, Kashmera Shah and Krushna Abhishek.
- Team Chhuri: Debina Bonnerjee, Gurmeet Choudhary, Eisha Singh, Vivian Dsena, Elvish Yadav, Isha Malviya, Karan Kundrra and Tejasswi Prakash.

Pairs

- Abhishek Kumar and Samarth Jurel
- Aly Goni and Jannat Zubair Rahmani
- Ankita Lokhande and Vicky Jain
- Arjun Bijlani and Tejasswi Prakash
- Elvish Yadav and Karan Kundrra
- Kashmera Shah and Krushna Abhishek
- Nia Sharma and Sudesh Lehri

=== Teams ===
Teams	Episodes	Week 1				Week 2				Week 3				Week 4				Week 5				Week 6				Week 7				Week 8				Week 9				Week 10				Stars Received		Team Stars Received
Teams	Episodes	Grand Premiere 1		Grand Premiere 2		Team Chhuri Ko Mili Kaante Ki Takkar		Chef Mode: Up In The Air		Habibi! Lets Cook Dubai Style		Parent Teacher Meeting		Powerstar Aa Gail		Kapil Sharma In The House		Dhak Dhak! Madhuri Graces The Show		Ho Ho Ho.. Santa In The Kitchen		A Special Baby Shower For Bharti		Kitchen Concert With Sunidhi Chauhan		Student Of The Year With LC Edition		Purani Khau Galli vs Nayi Khau Galli		Arjun Is Back In The Family		Happy Lohri		Karan On Fire:Taking Charge		When Laughter Chefs Meet Splitsvilla		Bharati Ki Waapsi Final Face-off Mein		Team Kaanta Aur Chhuri Ka Akhari Vaar		Stars Received		Team Stars Received
Teams	Recipes	Paneer Jaleba	Panjabi Samosa French Espresso	Chana Jor Garam Madhumati Mojito	Veg Kheema Ghotala-e-Guldasta	Jam Atta Biscuit	Cassava Pupusa	Makhan Tarbooj	Flower Spring Roll	Kunafa Bil Fustaq Wal Tamr	Mansaf	Maa Ki Chappal Baap Ka Thappad	Cheese Burst Frankie	Gud Thekua	Bhaukaal Baingan Chokha	Parantha Lassi	Gajar Halwa Truffles	Topi Dal Pakwan	Ukadiche Modak	Snow Globe	Christmas Charlie	Cake Cone	Lachha Burger Channa Tikki	Shrikhand Cigarillos	Cranberry Cheese Custard Bombs Ram Laddu	Kurram Kurram Cola Drink	Paneer Pesto Pizza	Kachora	Usal Poha	Chom Chom	Edible Soup Cup	Popcorn	Sarson Da Saag Makki Di Roti	Suji Rusk Masala Chai	Hanson Ka Joda	Marshmallow Hot Chocolate	Ravioli Di Ricotta e Spinaci Al Burro e Limone	Memory Cookies	Tandoori Matar Kulcha	XL Paani Puri Aur 2 Paani	Star Malpua	Stars Received		Team Stars Received
Team Kaanta	Abhishek & Samarth																																							×4		×7	x5	×36
Team Kaanta	Aly & Jannat																																							×4		×17	x5	×36
Team Kaanta	Krushna & Kashmera																																							×4		×7	x5	×36
Team Chhuri	Elvish & Isha																																							×5		×3	x5	×34
Team Chhuri	Gurmeet & Debina																																							×5		×5	x5	×34
Team Chhuri	Karan & Tejasswi																																							×5		×13	x5	×34
Team Chhuri	Vivian & Eisha																																							×5		×8	x5	×34
Notes		1											2								3				4					5, 6	5							7		8				9

==== Notes ====
- ^1: The pairs were divided into two teams, Team Chhuri and Team Kaanta.
- ^2: Team Chhuri lost one star after Isha Malviya entered the pantry out of turn which led one of her and Elvish's star being penalised.
- ^3: A team task held in which teams had to play in groups and whole group is given a single team star.
- ^4: A fun task held between girls and boys in which all the girls are in one team and boys are in another. Hence, no star was given.
- ^5: Karan was absent and was replaced by Arjun.
- ^6: No star were awarded.
- ^7: No star were awarded.
- ^8: In the round, Teams were given a chance to win even more stars by putting their already won stars at stake. If they lose, the amount of stars put on stake will be deducted from the overall stars won. Team Kaanta staked 4 stars, while Team Chhuri staked 5 stars. A pair from both teams won the round and received additional stars equal to the number they had staked.
- ^9: In the end, Team Kaanta lifted the trophy.

=== Pairs ===
Episodes	Week 11				Week 12				Week 13				Week 14				Week 15				Week 16				Week 17				Week 18				Week 19				Week 20				Week 21				Week 22				Week 23				Week 24				Week 25				Week 26				Week 27				Week 28				Week 29				Week 30				Week 31				Week 32				Week 33				Week 34				Week 35				Week 36			Stars Received
Episodes	SAVAN Squad is Back		Teja-Arjun's Epic Comeback		Manmarzi Special		Propose Day Special		Valentine Day Special		Laughter Chefs’ House Chefs Special		Sanjeev Kapoor Special		Aly’s Birthday Special		Laughter Chefs Go Wild!		Holi Ke Rang, Laughter Chefs Ke Sang		The Laughter Clinic		Women’s Day Special		Chefs Premier League		Laughter Chefs Mela		Mamta Kulkarni in the House		Eid Celebrations Special		Happy World Theatre Day		Happy April Fools' Day		Joint Families Grace the Kitchen		Dacoits in the Kitchen		Bhoots in the Kitchen		Happy Baisakhi		Breaking News from the Kitchen		Happy Birthday, Chef Harpal		A Birthday Surprise for Samarth		The Lord of Laughter		Mami Day		World Laughter Day		Happy Mother's Day		Shaadi Mubarak		Hai Laughter Chefs Toh Masti Honi Hai		Badhai Ho #Karate		Kitchen Mein Adla-Badli!		Laughter Chefs Akhada!		The Dhurandhar Comeback!		Krushna's Birthday Bash		A 90's Nostalgia Special		Happy Birthday Tejasswi!		Colors ki Family		Khatra Begins!		Dhamaal 4 Stars in Laughter Chefs		Station Ka Khatra!		The Ex-Khatra Panel		Fans in the Kitchen!		Mini-Chefs in the Kitchen!		Happy Birthday Laughter Queen		Do Star Ya No Star		Future with Cookie Baba		Khatron Ke Khiladi in the Kitchen!		Semi-Finale Special		Grand Finale Party I		Grand Finale Party II	Stars Received
Recipes	Chuthurth Jalebi	Patti Samosa	Shirvale Shikran	Paneer Makhni	Any Dish with Onion, Garlic or Ginger	Own Choice Dish	Aloo Chop	Dal Dhokli	Love Bear Cookie	Beetroot Lavash Rosemary Butter Candle	Suji Pockets	Stuffed Portobello Mushroom	Bombay Halwa	Bhaap Badi Salan	Trifle Cake	Nadru Seekh Kebab	Banana Chips	Nangua Hua Fritters; Honey Chilly Sauce	Thandai Ke Gubbare	Teekha Gathiya Amrudh Ki Chutney	Amlaprash	Lentil Burger Bun Sweet Potato Patty	Kangan Kai Murukku	Baingan Borani	Pico De Gallo Season Ball	Poori Aloo Ghee Roast	Choco Chuski	Schezwan Fried Rice Jhula	Laung Latika	Punjabi Kadhi	Diamond Falooda	Phulkopi Posto Luchi	Jaali Samosa	Apple Cinnamon Pie	Koyla Candy	Dahi Bhalla Cake	Sabudana Khichdi Dahi Tamatar Chutney Tulsi Adrak Chai	Sev Tamatar Sabji Phulka Heart Fryums	Gunpowder Goli	Croquettes De Colocasia	Tater Tots Corn Ribs	Palak Paneer	Gudpare	Kheer Kodum	Sansani Sharla Chaat	Dabang Designer Dhokla	Knotty Roles Chai	Patiala Katlamba Lassi	Horse Bombolini	Dil Phenk Basundi Paratha	Cheddar Veggies Canape	Paneer Tikka Masala	Chana Papdi Chaat	Mami Noodle Soup	Smiley	Hasta Kofta	Atte Ka Halwa	Phata Matka Kulcha	Shaadi Ka Haar	Shahi Dum Aloo	Soya Love Triangle	Rajma Chawal Ball	Challa	Gobi 65	Twisted Achaari Mathri	Hyderabadi Paneer	Flavored Butter Bun Maska	Chapli Keba Chutney	Khandvi	Aloo Matar	Mango Icecream	Thecha Gobi	Flower Karanji	Tawa Paneer Bhurji	Amritsari Satpura	Thalipeeth	Methi Khakhra Vadki Chakli Chivda	Paneer Do Pyaaza Rumali Roti	Cheesy Dinner Pocket	Shengole	Kesar Rasgulla	Mushroom Patte In Cheese Cups	Pyaaz Laccha Paratha; Noni Ghee	Dal Bukhara Style Chawal Sushi	Mango Sticky Rice	Dhaba Style Veg Kolhapuri	Social Media Story Cake Decoration	Fried calzone with Cheese garlic Veggies	Waffle House	Spaghetti Bolongese	Gola Kaju	Chole Kulcha Burger	14 Dishes “Khatra” Special	Linguine Aglio-E-olio	Gawar Patha Chaat	Chia Seed Pocket Mayo Coleslaw	Apple Chutney Himachali Patande	Bharwan Aloo Jeera	Tilkut	Paneer Kali Mirch	Star Cheese Herb Cookie	Bellam Putharekulu	Gulab Jamun Croissant	Stars Received
Aly & Jannat					(Onion Halwa)																				Tie	Team; Gas																																								(Aly & Ankita)																																		×31	×10		×20	×99
Arjun & Tejasswi						(Lasagna)																			Tie	Team; Gas																																							(Vicky & Teja) (Arjun & Karan)																																			×32	×10			×74
Elvish & Karan					(Ginger Strips Fortune Cookies)	(Bharwa Capsicum Gravy)																			Tie	Team; Gas																																							(Arjun & Karan)																																			×32		×10		×74
Ankita & Vicky						(Matar Nimona)																			Tie	Team; Gas																																							(Vicky & Teja)	(Aly & Ankita)																																		×27				×54
Krushna & Kashmera																									Tie	Team; Gas																																																																										×17				×34
Nia & Sudesh						(Lobia Masala)																			Tie	Team; Gas																																																																										×16				×32
Abhishek & Samarth																									Tie	Team; Gas																																																												×1														×5				×11
Notes																							1		2												3		4							5	6																7											8			9		10		11					12						13	14							15	16			17

==== Notes ====
- ^1: No stars were awarded.
- ^2: Participants competed in teams named 'Team Gas' and 'Team Lighter', captained by Arjun and Karan, respectively. No stars were awarded. Additionally, Ankita was absent and was replaced by Reem.
- ^3: Participants competed in teams named 'Sharma Family' and 'Lehri Family'.
- ^4: No stars were awarded.
- ^5: No stars were awarded.
- ^6: Prepared by Chef Harpal.
- ^7: No stars were awarded.
- ^8: No stars were awarded.
- ^9: Participants competed in teams named 'Chee View Society' and 'Coberoi Tower'.
- ^10: No stars were awarded.
- ^11: Chef Harpal was absent.
- ^12: Samarth-Abhishek loses a star to Karan-Elvish due to 'Khatra' twist.
- ^13: Participants competed in teams named 'Team Arshad' and 'Team Mona', captained by Arshad Warsi and Mona Singh, respectively.
- ^14: '14 Dishes Khatra'. Participants competed individually, with each participant preparing one dish judged on different criteria. Pairs will receive double stars if both partners win.
- ^15: Pairs were given a chance to double their stars by putting their already won stars at stake. If they lose, the amount of stars put on stake will be deducted from the overall stars won.
- ^16: Pairs were given a chance to earn even more stars.
- ^17: In the end, Aly-Jannat lifted the Trophy, whereas Arjun-Teja and Karan-Elvish finished Runner-up's.

=== Reception ===
Season three was the number-one ranked non-fiction show among all Hindi GEC programs and the third-ranked show overall in its debut week. The third season achieved higher TRP ratings compared to its first two seasons. The show became a major hit on Colors TV, launching as the year's biggest non-fiction show with a high 2.2 TRP (SD + HD) and ranking high on JioHotstar.
