= Khatron Ke Khiladi 10 =

Indian Reality Series

Fear Factor: Khatron Ke Khiladi
- Season 10
- Title screen
- Presented by: Rohit Shetty
- No. of contestants: 10
- Winner: Karishma Tanna
- Runner-up: Karan Patel
- No. of episodes: 22 (list of episodes)

Release
- Original network: Colors TV
- Original release: 22 February – 26 July 2020

Season chronology
- ← Previous; Season 9 Next → Made in India

Fear Factor: Khatron Ke Khiladi, Darr Lega Class Aur Dega Trass, is the tenth season of Fear Factor: Khatron Ke Khiladi, an Indian reality and stunt television series which was shot in August 2019 and premiered on 22 February 2020, on Colors TV. The series is produced by Endemol Shine India. Filmed in Bulgaria, it was hosted by Rohit Shetty. The season ended on 26 July 2020 with Karishma Tanna declared as the winner and Karan Patel as the 1st runner-up. The show's telecast was interrupted from 29 March to 27 June due to the COVID-19 pandemic.

== Contestants ==
Contestant	Occupation	Status	Place
Karishma Tanna	Actress	Winner (Week 10)	1st
Karan Patel	Actor	1st runner-up (Week 10)	2nd
Dharmesh Yelande	Choreographer	2nd runner-up (Week 10)	3rd
Balraj Syal	Comedian	Eliminated (Week 3)	4th
Balraj Syal	Comedian	Eliminated (Week 10)	4th
Shivin Narang	Actor	Eliminated (Week 9)	5th
Tejasswi Prakash	Actress	Quit (Week 9)	6th
Adaa Khan	Actress	Eliminated (Week 6)	7th
Amruta Khanvilkar	Actress	Eliminated (Week 5)	8th
RJ Malishka	RJ	Eliminated (Week 4)	9th
Rani Chatterjee	Actress	Eliminated (Week 1)	10th

Indicates original entrants
Indicates re-entered entrants

== Elimination chart ==
	Weeks																																														
	1			2			3			4							5			6					7					8						9						10					
	Grand Premiere			New Stunts			Torture Week			Team Week							Advantage Week			Best of Week					Partner Week					Ticket to Finale Week						Dosti Special						Grand Finale					
	22-23 Feb			29 Feb-1 Mar			7-8 Mar			14 Mar-15 Mar							21-22 Mar			28-29 Mar					27-28 June, 4 July^{5}					5 July, 11 July						12 July, 18 July						19 July		25-26 July			
Karishma	LOST	SAFE		LOST	SAFE		WIN			TEAM TEJASSWI	LOST	WIN	N/A	TEAM LOST	BTM5	SAVED BY CAPTAIN	WIN			WIN		LOST	SAFE		LOST	SAFE	LOST	BTM3	SAFE	WIN	LOST	LOST	N/A			Salman	WIN		WIN			WN	WIN	Finalist			Winner
Karan	WIN			WIN			LOST	BTM4	SAFE	TEAM KARAN	WIN	LOST	N/A	TEAM WIN			LOST^{3}	SAFE		LOST	SAFE	WIN			LOST	BTM3			SAFE	WIN	LOST	WIN	LOST			Abhishek	WIN		LOST	BTM2	SAFE	LOST	N/A	BTM2	SAFE	Finalist	1st Runner-Up
Dharmesh	LOST	SAFE		WIN			LOST	BTM4	SAFE	TEAM KARAN	WIN	LOST	WIN	TEAM WIN			WIN			WIN		LOST	SAFE		SAFE		WIN			LOST	N/A	WIN	WIN	TOF	TICKET TO FINALE	Kunwar	TICKET TO FINALE					LOST	N/A	WIN	Finalist		2nd Runner-Up
Balraj	LOST	BTM3	SAFE	LOST	BTM3	SAFE	LOST	BTM4	ELIMINATED	TEAM KARAN	WIN	N/A	N/A	TEAM WIN			LOST	SAFE		WIN		LOST	BTM3	SAFE	WIN		WIN			LOST	N/A	LOST	N/A			Shalin	SAFE		WIN			WIN	LOST	BTM2	ELIMINATED		
Shivin	WIN			WIN			LOST	BTM4	SAFE^{1}	TEAM TEJASSWI	LOST	WIN	LOST	TEAM LOST	BTM5	SAVED BY CAPTAIN	WIN			LOST	BTM3			SAFE	SAFE		LOST	BTM3	SAFE	LOST	N/A	LOST	N/A			Smriti	LOST	BTM2			ELIMINATED						
Tejasswi	WIN			LOST	BTM3	SAFE	WIN			TEAM TEJASSWI	LOST	WIN	N/A	TEAM LOST	BTM5	SAFE	WIN			WIN		WIN			WIN		SAFE			WIN	WIN		LOST			Kabeer	LOST	SAFE	Eliminated								
Adaa	WIN			WIN			LOST	SAFE		TEAM KARAN	WIN	N/A	WIN	TEAM WIN			LOST	BTM2^{3}	SAFE	LOST	SAFE	LOST	BTM3^{4}	ELIMINATED																							
Amruta	LOST	SAFE		LOST	BTM3	SAFE	WIN			TEAM KARAN	LOST		N/A	TEAM WIN			LOST	BTM2	ELIMINATED^{3}																												
Malishka	LOST	BTM3	SAFE	LOST	SAFE		WIN			TEAM TEJASSWI	LOST		LOST	TEAM LOST	BTM5	ELIMINATED																															
Rani	LOST	BTM3	ELIMINATED																																												

1. Malishka proxies Shivin due to injury
2. Stunt performed with an additional advantage
3. Shivin proxies Adaa due to injury
4. Due to COVID-19 pandemic, the show dates were postponed for 3 months. Repeat telecast was shown during this period.

Winner
1st runner-up
2nd runner-up
Finalists
Ticket To Finale
Won the stunt
Lost
Safe from elimination stunt
Bottom three
Saved
Eliminated
The contestant was a Wild Card Entry
Injury/Health Hault
The contestant quit the show.

== Reception ==
In its first week, the show was ranked in the second position in the most popular shows in India with Target Rating Point of 8392 impressions as per BARC. The show maintained the second position till the end of 4th week.

Week
Week		Pre-Pandemic						Post-Pandemic				
Week		1	2	3	4	5	6	7	8	9	10	11
BARC Viewership
BARC Viewership	TRP	3.3	3.1		3.0	2.6	N/A	2.1	2.2	2.7	2.8	2.9
BARC Viewership	Position	2nd										
Ref.												

== Episodes ==
No.	Title	Original release date
Part 1
1	"The Grand Premiere!"	22 February 2020
2	"Dekho, sher aaya!"	23 February 2020
3	"Haarsh is a stunt tester?!"	29 February 2020
4	"Rohit ka naya twist!"	1 March 2020
5	"The hellish rain of wax!"	7 March 2020
6	"Shivin's day of terror!"	8 March 2020
7	"Team Week: Team Tejasswi vs Team Karan!"	14 March 2020
8	"Karishma ki kashmakash!"	15 March 2020
9	"Kya Tejasswi mana payegi Mallishka ko?"	21 March 2020
10	"An advantage over fear!"	22 March 2020
11	"Sink and find the glint!"	28 March 2020
12	"Jeepers creepers, Shivin gets the creepers!"	29 March 2020
Part 2
13	"Who escapes the elimination?"	27 June 2020
14	"Rohit and Karan prank Balraj!"	28 June 2020
15	"The human torch!"	4 July 2020
16	"Race to the finale!"	5 July 2020
17	"In pursuit of parking!"	11 July 2020
18	"Can Smriti change Shivin's luck?"	12 July 2020
19	"Tejasswi looks for a proxy"	18 July 2020
20	"Can Karishma soar into the finale?"	19 July 2020
21	"The extreme extravaganza!"	25 July 2020
22	"Karan vs Karishma: The final showdown!"	26 July 2020

== Guest appearance ==
Name	Episode(s)	Reason		Ref.
Haarsh Limbachiyaa	1	Show's Intro Song		
Haarsh Limbachiyaa	3- 6	Stunt Tester		
Haarsh Limbachiyaa	21 & 22	For promoting Khatron Ke Khiladi-Made in India.		
Bharti Singh	5 & 6	For Torture Week		
Shalin Bhanot	18 & 19	As a partner in segment "Dosti Special"	Partner of Balraj	
Kunwar Amar	18 & 19	As a partner in segment "Dosti Special"	Partner of Dharmesh	
Abhishek Verma	18 & 19	As a partner in segment "Dosti Special"	Partner of Karan	
Salman Yusuff Khan	18 & 19	As a partner in segment "Dosti Special"	Partner of Karishma	
Smiriti Kalra	18 & 19	As a partner in segment "Dosti Special"	Partner of Shivin	
Kabeer Maira	18 & 19	As a partner in segment "Dosti Special"	Partner of Tejasswi	
Aly Goni	21 & 22	For promoting Khatron Ke Khiladi - Made In India.		
Jasmin Bhasin	21 & 22	For promoting Khatron Ke Khiladi - Made In India.		
Jay Bhanushali	21 & 22	For promoting Khatron Ke Khiladi - Made In India.		
Karan Wahi	21 & 22	For promoting Khatron Ke Khiladi - Made In India.		
Rithvik Dhanjani	21 & 22	For promoting Khatron Ke Khiladi - Made In India.		
