= Khatron Ke Khiladi 8 =

Fear Factor: Khatron Ke Khiladi
- Season 8
- Title screen
- Presented by: Rohit Shetty
- No. of contestants: 12
- Winner: Shantanu Maheshwari
- Runner-up: Hina Khan
- No. of episodes: 21

Release
- Original network: Colors TV
- Original release: 22 July – 30 September 2017

Season chronology
- ← Previous; Season 7 Next → Season 9

Fear Factor: Khatron Ke Khiladi, Pain in Spain is the eighth season of Fear Factor: Khatron Ke Khiladi, an Indian reality and stunt television series aired from 22 July to 30 September 2017 on Colors TV. The series is produced by of Endemol Shine India.

The season was filmed in Spain and hosted by Rohit Shetty. Shantanu Maheshwari was declared the winner and Hina Khan the runner up.

== Contestants ==
Name	Occupation	Place	Status
Shantanu Maheshwari	Dancer & actor	1st	Winner
Hina Khan	Actress	2nd	Runner-up
Ravi Dubey	Actor	3rd	Eliminated
Nia Sharma	Actress	4th	Eliminated
Nia Sharma	Actress	4th	Eliminated
Nia Sharma	Actress	4th	Eliminated
Monica Dogra	Musician & actress	5th	Eliminated
Monica Dogra	Musician & actress	5th	Eliminated
Lopamudra Raut	Model	6th	Eliminated
Rithvik Dhanjani	Actor	7th	Eliminated
Karan Wahi	Actor	8th	Eliminated
Geeta Phogat	Wrestler	9th	Eliminated
Manveer Gurjar	Television personality	10th	Eliminated
Shiny Doshi	Actress	11	Eliminated
Shibani Dandekar	Actress, singer & model	12	Eliminated

Indicates original entrants
Indicates re-entered entrants

== Elimination chart ==
Contestant	Weeks																																							
Contestant	1			2			3			4							5		6					7			8				9				10			11		
Contestant	Grand Premiere			Twist Week			Best of Stunts Week			Boys v/s Girls							FilmySpecial		Head on Week					Torture Week			Roti Kapda aur Makaan				Ticket to Finale Week				Family Special			Grand finale		
Contestant	22-23 July			29-30 July			5-6 August			12-13 August							19-20 August		26-27 August					2-3 September			9-10 September				16-17 September				23-24 September			30 September		
Shantanu	WIN			WIN			WIN			TEAM BOYS	WIN	N/A	TEAM WIN (4 Pts.)				WIN		WIN		WIN			WIN			WIN		WIN		WIN	LOST	WIN	LOST	LOST		WIN	WIN	WIN	WINNER
Hina	WIN			WIN			WIN			TEAM CAPTAIN	TIE	N/A	TEAM LOST	BTM5	SAVED BY CAPTAIN		WIN		WIN		WIN			WIN			LOST	BTM4		SAFE	LOST	N/A	LOST	N/A	WIN	LOST	WIN	WIN	WIN	RUNNER-UP
Ravi	LOST	SAFE		WIN			LOST	SAFE		TEAM BOYS	LOST	N/A	TEAM WIN (4 Pts.)				WIN		LOST	SAFE	WIN			WIN			WIN		BTM4	SAFE	WIN	WIN		LOST	WIN	WIN		WIN	LOST	ELIMINATED
Nia	LOST	SAFE		WIN			LOST	BTM2	ELIMINATED	TEAM GIRLS	WIN	LOST	TEAM LOST	BTM5	SAVED BY CAPTAIN		WIN		LOST	BTM3			ELIMINATED)^{1}	WIN			LOST	SAFE	WIN		LOST	N/A	WIN	WIN	TICKET TO FINALE			LOST	LOST	ELIMINATED
Monica	LOST	SAFE		WIN			WIN			TEAM GIRLS	LOST	N/A	TEAM LOST	BTM5	BTM2	ELIMINATED)^{1}								LOST	BTM2	SAFE	WIN		BTM4	SAFE	WIN	LOST	LOST	N/A	WIN	LOST	WIN	LOST	ELIMINATED	
Lopamudra	LOST	BTM2	SAFE	WIN			LOST	BTM2	SAFE	TEAM GIRLS	WIN	LOST	TEAM LOST	BTM5	SAVED BY CAPTAIN		WIN		LOST	BTM3			SAFE	LOST	SAFE		WIN		WIN		LOST	N/A	LOST	N/A	LOST		ELIMINATED			
Rithvik	WIN			LOST	SAFE		WIN			TEAM BOYS	LOST	WIN	TEAM WIN (4 Pts.)				BTM4	SAFE	LOST	SAFE	LOST	SAFE		WIN			WIN		WIN		LOST	N/A	LOST	N/A	LOST		ELIMINATED			
Karan	WIN			LOST	SAFE		WIN			TEAM BOYS	WIN	WIN	TEAM WIN (4 Pts.)				BTM4	SAFE	WIN		LOST	BTM3	SAFE	LOST	SAFE		LOST	SAFE	BTM4	ELIMINATED										
Geeta	WIN			WIN			WIN			TEAM GIRLS	LOST	N/A	TEAM LOST	BTM5	BTM2	SAFE	BTM4	SAFE	WIN		LOST	SAFE		LOST	BTM2	ELIMINATED														
Manveer	WIN			LOST	BTM2	SAFE	LOST	SAFE		TEAM CAPTAIN	TIE	N/A	TEAM WIN (4 Pts.)				BTM4	ELIMINATED																						
Shiny	WIN			LOST	BTM2	ELIMINATED																																		
Shibani	LOST	BTM2	ELIMINATED																																					

Winner
1st runner up
2nd runner up
Finalist
Ticket to finale
Lost task
Won first task
Was safe from elimination stunt
Bottom position
Saved
Eliminated
Wild card entry
Injury/health halt
N/A
Disqualified

== Reception ==
Week	1	2	3	4	5	6	7	8	9	10	11
Ratings	3.3	3.2	3.1	3.3			3.9		3.9		2.9
