= Khatron Ke Khiladi 9 =

2019 season of Indian reality TV series

Fear Factor: Khatron Ke Khiladi
- Season 9
- Title screen
- Presented by: Rohit Shetty
- No. of contestants: 12
- Winner: Punit Pathak
- Runner-up: Aditya Narayan
- No. of episodes: 20

Release
- Original network: Colors TV
- Original release: 5 January – 10 March 2019

Season chronology
- ← Previous; Season 8 Next → Season 10

Fear Factor: Khatron Ke Khiladi, Jigar Pe Trigger is the ninth season of Fear Factor: Khatron Ke Khiladi, an Indian reality and stunt television series premiered on 5 January 2019 and aired on Colors TV. The series was produced by Endemol Shine India. Filmed in Argentina, it was hosted by Rohit Shetty. For the first time, the finale was broadcast live on 10 March 2019 to promote Rising Star 3 and Akshay Kumar's Kesari. The season ended on 10 March 2019 with Punit Pathak declared the winner while Aditya Narayan became the 1st runner up.

== Contestants ==
Name	Occupation	Place	Status
Punit Pathak	Choreographer and actor	1st	Winner
Aditya Narayan	Actor and singer	2nd	1st runner-up
Ridhima Pandit	Actor	3rd	2nd runner-up
Shamita Shetty	Actress and model	4th	Eliminated
Aly Goni	Actor	5th	Eliminated
Aly Goni	Actor	5th	Eliminated
Bharti Singh	Comedian	6th	Eliminated
Jasmin Bhasin	Actress	7th	Eliminated
Vikas Gupta	Producer and host	8th	Ejected
Haarsh Limbachiyaa	Producer and writer	9th	Eliminated
Zain Imam	Actor	10th	Eliminated
S. Sreesanth	Cricketer	11th	Eliminated
Avika Gor	Actress	12th	Eliminated

Indicates original entrants
Indicates the wild card entrants
Indicates re-entered entrants

Future Appearnaces Jasmin, Bharti and Haarsh competed on Khatron Ke Khiladi: Made in India. Later on Jasmin and Avika returned to compete on Season 15. Bharti made an appearance in season 15.

== Elimination chart ==
	Weeks																																										
	1			2			3			4			5			6					7							8					9						10				
	Grand Premiere			Twist Week			Horror Week			Stunt Game			Best of Stunts Week			Partner Week					Team Week							Ticket to Finale Week					Advantage Week						Grand Finale				
	5-6 Jan			12-13 Jan			19-20 Jan			26-27 Jan			2-3 Feb			9-10 Feb					16-17 Feb							23-24 Feb					2-3 March						9 March			10 March	
Punit	WIN			WIN			WIN			WIN			WIN			WIN		WIN				WIN	WIN	N/A	TIE (60 Points)	SAVED BY CAPTAIN		WIN	FAIL				LOST^{3}	SAFE^{3}	WIN^{3}	Finalist			WIN			WIN	WINNER
Aditya	LOST	SAFE		WIN			LOST	SAFE		WIN			LOST	SAFE ^{1}		INJURY LEAVE						LOST	LOST	WIN	TIE (60 Points)	SAVED BY CAPTAIN		WIN	WIN	FAIL			WIN		LOST	SAFE	Finalist		LOST	SAFE		WIN	1ST RUNNER-UP
Ridhima	WIN			LOST	SAFE		LOST	BTM3	SAFE	LOST	BTM3'	SAFE	WIN			LOST	BTM4			SAFE		LOST	WIN	LOST	TIE (60 Points)	BTM2	SAFE	FAIL					LOST	SAFE^{3}	LOST	BTM3^{3}	SAFE	Finalist	WIN			WIN	2ND RUNNER-UP
Shamita	NOT IN COMPETITION								WILD CARD	LOST	SAFE		LOST	SAFE		LOST	SAFE	LOST	SAFE		C	LOST	LOST	WIN	TIE (60 Points)	SAVED BY CAPTAIN		WIN	WIN	WIN	WIN	TOF	Ticket To Finale						LOST	SAFE		LOST	ELIMINATED
Aly	WIN			LOST	BTM3	SAFE	WIN			LOST	BTM3	SAFE	LOST	BTM2	ELIMINATED							WIN	WIN	LOST	TIE (60 Points)	SAVED BY CAPTAIN		WIN	WIN	WIN	FAIL		WIN^{3}		WIN^{3}	Finalist			LOST	BTM2	SAFE	LOST	ELIMINATED
Bharti	LOST	BTM3	SAFE	WIN			LOST	SAFE		LOST	BTM3	SAFE	WIN			WIN		WIN			C	LOST	WIN	LOST	TIE (60 Points)	SAVED BY CAPTAIN		FAIL					LOST	BTM3			SAFE	Finalist	LOST	BTM2^{4}	ELIMINATED^{5}		
Jasmin	LOST	SAFE		LOST	BTM3	SAFE	WIN			LOST	SAFE		LOST	BTM2	SAFE	WIN		LOST	BTM4	SAFE		LOST	LOST	WIN	TIE (60 Points)	BTM2	SAFE	FAIL					LOST	BTM3			ELIMINATED						
Vikas	LOST	BTM3	SAFE	LOST	SAFE		WIN			WIN			WIN			LOST	SAFE	LOST	SAFE			WIN	N/A	Health Hault			EJECTED																
Haarsh	LOST	BTM3	SAFE	WIN			LOST	BTM3	SAFE	WIN			LOST	SAFE		WIN		LOST	BTM4	ELIMINATED																							
Zain	WIN			LOST	SAFE		LOST	SAFE		LOST	SAFE		WIN			LOST	BTM4			ELIMINATED																							
Sreesanth	WIN			WIN			LOST	BTM3	ELIMINATED																																		
Avika	LOST	SAFE^{2}		LOST	BTM3	ELIMINATED																																					

1. Punit proxies Aditya due to injury
2. Ridhima proxies Avika due to injury
3. Stunts performed with an additional disadvantage
4. Ridhima proxies Bharti due to injury
5. Harsh proxies Bharti due to injury

Winner
Runner Up
Finalists
Ticket To Finale
Lost Task
Won First Task
Was Safe from Elimination stunt
The contestant lost the stunt during the Ticket To Finale Race
Bottom Position
Saved
Eliminated
Wild Card Entry
Injury/Health Hault
Not in Competition
N/A
Disqualified

== Reception ==
In its first week, the show was ranked in the second position in the most popular shows in India. The show has received a number of Target rating point, 14277 impressions. During second week, the show received 13513 impressions with second position. It came live on 10 March 2019 on its Grand Finale for the live audition of the 1st contestant of rising star 3.This season was a great success and topped the television ratings points till its end .

== Guest appearances ==
Ranveer Singh (Week 8) - to promote Gully Boy.

Haarsh Limbachiyaa (Week 9) - to cheer Bharti Singh.

Jasmin Bhasin and Haarsh Limbachiyaa (Week 10) - to perform an elimination stunt in place of Bharti Singh after she was injured.

Grand finale

Former Host Akshay Kumar appeared to perform a stunt and to promote Kesari. The Former host gave Kesari challenge to the contestants.

Shankar Mahadevan, Neeti Mohan, Diljit Dosanjh and Usha Timothy (Contestant) and other contestants of Rising Star India (season 3) appeared to promote the new season of Rising Star. Abhishek Saraph (Contestant) appeared for a live audition for Rising Star 3.
