= Rahul Vaidya =

Indian singer (born 1987)

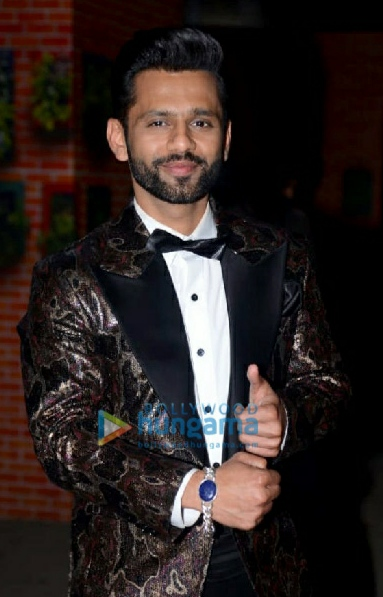
- Vaidya at Bigg Boss 14 finale
- Born: Rahul Krushna Vaidya; 23 September 1987 (age 39); Nagpur, Maharashtra, India
- Other name: RKV
- Occupations: Singer; composer
- Years active: 1997, 2004–present
- Known for: Indian Idol 1; Bigg Boss 14; Fear Factor: Khatron Ke Khiladi 11
- Spouse: Disha Parmar (m. 2021)
- Children: 1
- Musical career
- Genres: Indian pop playback singing
- Instrument: Vocal
- Label: RKV

Rahul Krushna Vaidya (born 23 September 1987) is an Indian singer and music composer. He started his career with the reality show Indian Idol 1 in which he became 2nd runner up. He has also participated in Bigg Boss 14 and was crowned as the 1st runner up. He also participated in Fear Factor: Khatron Ke Khiladi 11 and became a finalist.

== Early life ==
Vaidya grew up in Mumbai, where he studied classical music under Suresh Wadkar.

== Career ==
Vaidya finished third on the first season of Indian Idol, he lost in the penultimate round, on 18 February 2005. Eight months later, he released his debut album Tera Intezar. Sajid–Wajid composed the music for his album. He also sang a duet, "Hello Madam, I am your Adam", with fellow Indian Idol runner-up Prajakta Shukre, and "God Promise Dil Dola" with Shreya Ghoshal for the film Shaadi No. 1. Later he sang for films, such as Jigyasa, Hot Money and Krazzy 4 and title song of television series Ek Ladki Anjaani Si.

Vaidya was the host of the show Jjhoom India. In 2008, he won the title of Jo Jeeta Wohi Superstar, a reality singing show.

In 2013, Vaidya sung "Be Intehaan" (Unplugged) from Race 2. On the occasion of Independence Day, he released a new song, 'Vande Mataram'. He was the co-host of the dance reality show Aajaa Mahi Vay with Vinit Singh.

Vaidya is a successful contestant of the singing show Music Ka Maha Muqqabla in the team Shankar's Rockstars. His team won, beating Shaan's Strikers in the finale.

In 2020, he participated in Colors TV's reality show Bigg Boss 14, and emerged as the runner-up of the show. In 2021, Vaidya participated in the stunt-based reality show Fear Factor: Khatron Ke Khiladi 11 and became a finalist.

In 2024, he participated in Colors TV's reality show called Laughter Chef.

== Personal life ==
Vaidya was in a relationship with model and actress Disha Parmar. He proposed to her during his appearance on Bigg Boss 14. They were married on 16 July 2021. The couple welcomed their first child, a daughter, on 20 September 2023. The duo has decided the name of their little daughter: "Navya."

== In the media ==
Vaidya was ranked at No.16 in the Times of India's 20 Most Desirable Men on Television in 2020.

== Television ==
| Year | Title | Role | Notes | Ref. |
|---|---|---|---|---|
| 1997 | Star Yaar Kalakar | Contestant | Debut | |
| 1997–1998 | Close Up Antakshari | Contestant | | |
| 2000 | Aao Jhoomein Gaayen | Contestant | | |
| 2001 | Chalti Ka Naam Antakshari | Contestant | | |
| 2004–2005 | Indian Idol 1 | Contestant | 2nd runner-up | |
| 2007 | Jjhoom India | Host | | |
| 2008 | Jo Jeeta Wohi Super Star | Contestant | Winner | |
| 2008 | Aajaa Mahi Vay | Host | | |
| 2010 | Music Ka Maha Muqqabla | Contestant | Winner | |
| 2012 | Ramleela- Ajay Devgn ke Saath | Voice of Lord Rama | Musical Cast | |
| 2014 | Jhalak Dikhhla Jaa 7 | Contestant | Not selected | |
| 2015 | Indian Idol Junior 2 | Guest | | |
| 2017 | The Drama Company | Guest | | |
| 2017 | Music Ki Pathshala | Host | | |
| 2020–2021 | Bigg Boss 14 | Contestant | 1st runner-up | |
| 2021 | Fear Factor: Khatron Ke Khiladi 11 | Contestant | 6th place | |
| 2024–2025 | Laughter Chefs – Unlimited Entertainment | Contestant | Season 1–2 Winner (Season 1) | |
| 2026–present | Dhammal with Pati Patni Aur Panga – Jodiyon Ka Reality Check | Contestant | Season 2 | |

=== Guest appearances ===
| Year | Title | Ref. |
|---|---|---|
| 2021 | Dance Deewane 3 | |
| 2021 | Zee Comedy Show | |
| 2021 | Bigg Boss 15 | |
| 2021 | Kaun Banega Crorepati 13 | |
| 2022 | The Khatra Khatra Show | |
| 2022 | Swayamvar – Mika Di Vohti | |
| 2022 | Indian Idol 13 | |
| 2026 | Laughter Chefs – Unlimited Entertainment season 3 | |

== Discography ==
=== Film songs ===
| Year | Film | Song |
|---|---|---|
| 1999 | Jahan Tum Le Chalo | "Flights of Passions" |
| 2005 | Shaadi No. 1 | "Hello Madam" |
| 2005 | Shaadi No. 1 | "God Promise Dil" |
| 2006 | Yanda Kartavya Aahe | "Aabhas Ha" |
| 2006 | Jaan-E-Mann | "Qabool Kar Le" |
| 2006 | Jigyaasa | "Sanse Meri Sase" |
| 2008 | Krazy 4 | "Ek Rupaiya" |
| 2009 | Kisse Pyaar Karoon | "Chunar Chunar" |
| 2009 | Josh | "Evvariki" |
| 2013 | Race 2 | "Be Intehaan (Unplugged)" |
| 2013 | Jai Maharashtra Dhaba Bhatinda | "Avakhalase Sparsh Te" |
| 2013 | Ishkq in Paris | "It's All About Tonight" |
| 2014 | Amit Sahni Ki List | "What The 'FARK'" |
| 2015 | All Is Well | "Baaton Ko Teri (Unplugged)" |
| 2015 | Bhaag Johnny | "Meri Zindagi" |
| 2018 | Padmaavat (Tamil) | "Unadhallavaa" |
| 2018 | Padmaavat (Telugu) | "Oka Praanam Oka Jeevitham" |
| 2019 | War (Telugu) | "Gunde Lo Thootlu Pade" |
| 2019 | War (Tamil) | "Salangaigal" |
| 2023 | Ekda Yeun Tar Bagha (Marathi) | "Aiyo" |

=== Non-film songs ===
| Year | Album(s)/single(s) | Label | Notes | Ref. |
|---|---|---|---|---|
| 2005 | Tera Intezar | Sony Music India | Debut album | |
| 2011 | Aafno Mann | Sonu Music | | |
| 2014 | Fan | Tips Official | With Badshah | |
| 2014 | Vande Mataram | Rahul Vaidya RKV | | |
| 2016 | Do Chaar Din | T-Series | | |
| 2016 | Simple Dress | T-Series | | |
| 2018 | Keh Do Na | Zee Music Company | | |
| 2019 | Yaad Teri | Rahul Vaidya RKV | | |
| 2019 | Lambo | Rahul Vaidya RKV | | |
| 2019 | Jayaz | Rahul Vaidya RKV | | |
| 2020 | Maa Meri Maa | Rahul Vaidya RKV | | |
| 2021 | Madhanya | Desi Music Factory | With Asees Kaur | |
| 2021 | Kinna Sona | Rahul Vaidya RKV | | |
| 2021 | Aly | Rahul Vaidya RKV | | |
| 2021 | Chhap Tilak | Rahul Vaidya RKV | With Palak Muchhal | |
| 2021 | Matthe Te Chamkan | Rahul Vaidya RKV | | |
| 2021 | Shayad Fir Se | Nupur Audio | | |
| 2021 | Garbe Ki Raat | Rahul Vaidya RKV | With Bhoomi Trivedi | |
| 2021 | Zindagi Khafa Khafa | Ishtar Music | | |
| 2022 | Naughty Balam | Rahul Vaidya RKV | With Nikhita Gandhi ft. Mellow D | |

=== Others ===
- Dilbar Mere (The Unwind Mix – Bollywood Unwind 2)
- Dil Lena Khel Hai Dildar Ka (Bollywood Unwind 4)
- Maine Puchha Chand Se (The Unwind Mix)
- Ek Pyaar Ka Nagma (Unplugged)
- Mere Rashqa Qamar (Unplugged)
- Dil Diyan Gallan (EDM Mix)

== Awards ==
| Year | Award | Category | Song | Result |
|---|---|---|---|---|
| 2019 | Indian Television Academy Awards | Music video | Yaad Teri and Jayaz | Won |
