= Paras Chhabra =

Indian model and television actor

Paras S Chhabra
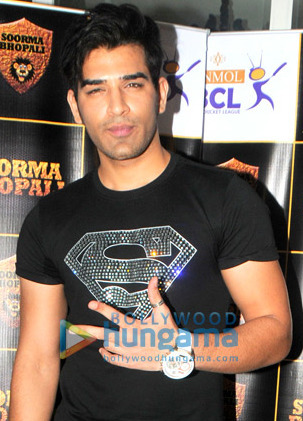
- Paras Chhabra in 2014
- Born: 11 July 1990 (age 35); Delhi, India
- Occupations: Model; Actor
- Years active: 2012–present
- Known for: MTV Splitsvilla 5 Bigg Boss 13

Paras Chhabra (born 11 July 1990) is an Indian model, actor and reality television personality. He is known for winning MTV Splitsvilla 5 and for being a finalist in Bigg Boss 13.

== Career ==
Chhabra started his career in 2012 by participating in MTV India's Splitsvilla 5 and emerged as the winner with Akanksha Popli. Next, he appeared in Channel V India's V The Serial opposite Sara Khan. In 2015, he participated in MTV India's Splitsvilla 8. In 2016, he played Tejinder Singh in &TV's Badho Bahu. In 2017, he portrayed Kaal Ketu in Star Plus's Aarambh. He went on to play Tommy Singh in Kaleerein, Duryodhan in Karn Sangini, Ravan in Vighnaharta Ganesha and Soham in Aghori. In September 2019, Chhabra participated in Colors TV's Bigg Boss 13. He emerged as a finalist and decided to walk out, opting for the cash prize of 10 lakhs. In 2020, he participated in Colors TV's Mujhse Shaadi Karoge along with Shehnaaz Gill.

== Personal life ==
Chhabra dated co-star Sara Khan from 2012 to 2015 before she broke up with him for unknown reasons. Khan later bitterly accused him of using her name for publicity. In 2018, he briefly dated actress Pavitra Punia. They broke up after he came to know that she hid her marital status from him.

Chhabra later began dating actress Akanksha Puri and was planning to marry her by 2020. However, according to her, he shortly after left her for Mahira Sharma, his fellow contestant in Bigg Boss 13. Chhabra and Sharma's relationship went on for three years before they parted ways. In 2024, he revealed on a podcast that he is single.

== Filmography ==
=== Television ===
Year	Title	Role	Notes
2012	MTV Splitsvilla 5	Contestant	Winner
2012	V The Serial	Himself	
2013	Nach Baliye 6	Contestant	Not selected
2014–2015	Box Cricket League	Contestant	
2015	MTV Splitsvilla 8	Contestant	7th place
2016	Badho Bahu	Tejinder Singh	
2017	Aarambh	Kaal Ketu	
2018	Kaleerein	Tommy Singh	
2018	Karn Sangini	Duryodhana	
2019	Vighnaharta Ganesha	Ravan	
2019	Aghori	Soham	
2019–2020	Bigg Boss 13	Contestant	6th place
2020	Mujhse Shaadi Karoge	Himself	
2020	Ladies vs Gentlemen	Panelist	
2021	Bigg Boss 14	Himself	Guest

=== Music videos ===
Year	Title	Singer(s)	Ref(s)
2018	Jaan Lain Tak	Nachhatar Gill	
2018	The Queen	Jenny Johal	
2019	ATM Di Machine	Dev Negi	
2020	Baarish	Sonu Kakkar	
2020	Hashtag Love Soniyea	Piyush Mehroliyaa	
2020	Ring	Raman Goyal	
2020	Kamaal Karte Ho	Afsana Khan	
2021	Bardaashth	Hariharan	
2021	Rang Lageya	Mohit Chauhan, Rochak Kohli	
2021	Galat	Asees Kaur	
2021	Nazaraa	Ustad Puran Chand Wadali, Lakhwinder Wadali	
2021	Pyaar V Karna Sikhle	Afsana Khan	
2021	Chubhti Hai Saansein	Palak Muchhal	
2022	Jinna Royi Aan	Ninja	
2022	Kashmiri Apple	Asees Kaur	
