= Bigg Boss (Hindi TV series) season 13 =

Season of television series (2019)

Bigg Boss
- Season 13
- Presented by: Salman Khan
- No. of days: 141
- No. of contestants: 21
- Winner: Sidharth Shukla
- Runner-up: Asim Riaz
- No. of episodes: 139

Release
- Original network: Colors TV
- Original release: 29 September 2019 – 16 February 2020

Season chronology
- ← Previous; Season 12 Next → Season 14

Bigg Boss 13, also known as Bigg Boss Tedha, is the thirteenth season of the Indian reality TV series Bigg Boss and premiered on 29 September 2019 on Colors TV. Salman Khan hosted the season for the tenth time. The grand finale of the show took place on 16 February 2020, when Sidharth Shukla emerged as the winner and Asim Riaz as the runner-up. It is also one of the most watched and successful seasons ever. It had an average 2.1-2.5 TRP every week.

== Production ==
This season it was revealed by the show makers that this season will only feature celebrity contestants, therefore declaring no commoners.

=== Eye Logo ===
The season featured a red eye logo with several fire flares coming out of it. The pupil of the eye was sky blue with a black lens in it.

=== House ===
House pictures were officially released on 23 September 2019; the House followed the theme of a "Bigg Boss Museum" and was located in Goregaon. On Week 16, BB Jail was closed introducing BB Elite Club.

== Housemates status ==
Sr	Housemates	Day entered	Day exited	Status
1	Sidharth S	Day 1	Day 71	Hospitalized
1	Sidharth S	Day 79	Day 140	Winner
2	Asim	Day 1	Day 140	1st runner-up
3	Shehnaaz	Day 1	Day 140	2nd runner-up
4	Rashmi	Day 1	Day 35	Evicted
4	Rashmi	Day 39	Day 140	3rd runner-up
5	Arti	Day 1	Day 140	4th runner-up
6	Paras	Day 1	Day 68	Injured
6	Paras	Day 75	Day 140	Walked, 5th runner-up
7	Mahira	Day 1	Day 136	Evicted
8	Vishal	Day 43	Day 133	Evicted
9	Shefali J	Day 35	Day 119	Evicted
10	Madhurima	Day 64	Day 112	Ejected
11	Shefali B	Day 1	Day 35	Evicted
11	Shefali B	Day 64	Day 99	Evicted by Housemates
12	Arhaan	Day 35	Day 49	Evicted
12	Arhaan	Day 64	Day 92	Evicted
13	Devoleena	Day 1	Day 35	Evicted
13	Devoleena	Day 39	Day 63	Walked
13	Vikas G	Day 70	Day 91	Proxy of Devoleena
14	Vikas P	Day 35	Day 77	Evicted
15	Himanshi	Day 35	Day 70	Evicted by Housemates
16	Khesari	Day 35	Day 54	Evicted by Housemates
17	Tehseen	Day 35	Day 44	Evicted
18	Siddhartha D	Day 1	Day 31	Evicted
19	Abu	Day 1	Day 22	Evicted by Housemates
20	Koena	Day 1	Day 15	Evicted
21	Dalljiet	Day 1	Day 14	Evicted

== Housemates ==
The participants in the order of appearance and entered in house are:

=== Original entrants ===
- Sidharth Shukla – Actor and model. He was known for his role of Shiv in Balika Vadhu and Parth Bhanushali in Dil Se Dil Tak
- Siddhartha Dey – Writer. He has written for many reality shows like Bigg Boss, Jhalak Dikhhla Jaa and Indian Idol.
- Paras Chhabra – Television actor, reality TV star and model. He participated in MTV Splitsvilla 5 and became the winner in 2012.
- Abu Malik – Singer and brother of music director Anu Malik. He acted in the film Pyaar Kiya Toh Darna Kya.
- Asim Riaz – Model. He appeared in the 2014 film Main Tera Hero in a cameo appearance.
- Mahira Sharma – Television actress. She is known for her roles in Naagin 3, Kundali Bhagya and Bepanah Pyaar.
- Devoleena Bhattacharjee – Television actress and dancer. She is known for her role of Gopi Modi in Saath Nibhaana Saathiya.
- Rashami Desai – Television and film actress. She is known for playing the roles of Tapasya in Uttaran and Shorvari in Dil Se Dil Tak.
- Shehnaaz Gill – Punjabi singer and actress. She has featured in the music video song "Yeh Baby" by Garry Sandhu.
- Shefali Bagga – Journalist and television news anchor with the India Today group.
- Dalljiet Kaur – Television actress. She is known for her role of Anjali in Iss Pyaar Ko Kya Naam Doon?.
- Koena Mitra – Film actress and model. She is known for appearing in the film Musafir for the item song 'Saki Saki'.
- Arti Singh – Television actress. She is known for her role of Amba in Waaris.

=== Wild card entrants ===
- Vikas Pathak (also known as Hindustani Bhau) – Content creator.
- Tehseen Poonawalla – Lawyer and political analyst.
- Khesari Lal Yadav – Indian actor, singer, and model associated with Bhojpuri cinema.
- Shefali Jariwala – Actress. She was known for her music video "Kaanta Laga".
- Arhaan Khan – Actor and model. He is known for his role of Rana Singh Ahlawat in Badho Bahu.
- Himanshi Khurana – Punjabi singer and actor. She is known for acting in the Punjabi film Sadda Haq.
- Vishal Aditya Singh – Television actor. He is known for his roles in Begusarai, Chandrakanta, Kullfi Kumarr Bajewala and participating in Nach Baliye 9.
- Madhurima Tuli – Television and film actress. She is known for her roles in Baby, Chandrakanta and participating in Nach Baliye 9.

=== Guest entrants ===
- Vikas Gupta – Producer and season 11 finalist. He entered as proxy of Devoleena.

== Twists ==
This season featured various twists, following are few of the twists:

=== Bed Friend Forever (BFF) ===
On Launch Day before housemates entering the house, female housemate were given two options to choose from to be their BFF. Bigg Boss later announced that they have to abide by the rules and can not change their bed partners.

Band Color	Band 1	Band 2	Band 3
Red	Mahira	Asim	–
Orange	Arti	Paras	Devoleena
Yellow	Rashami	Sidharth	–
Green	Shefali	Koena	–
Blue	Shehnaaz	Siddhartha D	–
Violet	Dalljiet	Abu	–

Due to legal issues, this concept was canceled by Bigg Boss on Day 10.

=== Sultani Akhada ===
The season brought back the segment for the third time. Two housemates have to do physical tasks during the weekend ka vaar's with Salman Khan. There are two rounds. In the first round will be a debate between the two housemates and second will be a light wrestling match. Whoever succeeds these two rounds will be the winner and will get a power. It ended after week eight.

Weeks	1	2	3	4	5	6	7	8
Weeks	Day 7	Day 13	N/A		Day 34	N/A		Day 55
Participants for Sultani Akhada	Siddhartha; Sidharth	Mahira; Shefali B	N/A		Asim; Paras; Sidharth	N/A		Himanshi; Shehnaaz
Winner	Sidharth	Mahira	N/A		Asim	N/A		Himanshi

=== BB Elite Club ===
In week 16, Bigg Boss announced about BB Elite Club whose members will get some special privileges and power to save themselves from being nominated for any one week before the finale week.

Weeks	16	17	18	19
Contenders	Asim; Shehnaz	Arti; Rashami; Mahira	Sidharth; Asim; Paras; Mahira	Shehnaz; Arti; Rashami; Paras; Mahira
Elite Club Member	Asim	No Elite Club; Member	Sidharth	Rashami
Ref.				

=== Connection Week ===
In Week 18 (Only for Week 18), Bigg Boss announced that connections of housemates will come to play with their connections.

Housemates	Connection Name	Connection
Rashami	Devoleena	Friend
Sidharth	Vikas G	Friend
Asim	Himanshi	Girlfriend
Arti	Kashmera	Sister-in-law
Paras	Shefali J	Friend
Vishal	Kunal	Brother
Mahira	Akash	Brother
Shehnaaz	Shehbaz	Brother

== Guest appearances ==
Week(s)	Day(s)	Guest(s)	Notes	Ref
First Day First Show	Day 0	Krushna Abhishek	To support sister Arti Singh
First Day First Show	Day 0	Neha Kakkar	To support friend Siddhartha Dey
First Day First Show	Day 0	Himesh Reshammiya	To support friend Siddhartha Dey
First Day First Show	Day 0	Farah Khan	To support friend Siddhartha Dey
First Day First Show	Day 0	Rashmi Singh	To support his Saathiya co-star Devoleena Bhattacharjee
First Day First Show	Day 0	Anu Malik	To support brother Abu Malik
First Day First Show	Day 0	Amaal Mallik	To support uncle Abu Malik
Week 1	Day 1	Ameesha Patel	As the Owner of the House
Week 1	Day 7	Hina Khan	To bring task for housemates
Week 1	Day 7	Sanaya Irani	To support friend Dalljiet Kaur
Week 1	Day 7	Ankita Lokhande	To support friend Rashami Desai
Week 1	Day 7	Krushna Abhishek	To give a message to Arti Singh
Week 2	Day15	Nawazuddin Siddiqui	To promote Motichoor Chaknachoor
Week 2	Day15	Sunil Grover and Haarsh Limbachiya	To show his orchestra/magic and to conduct Ration Task
Week 2	Day15	Priyank Sharma	To promote his show Bigg Buzz which is related to Bigg Boss and to give housemates a task
Week 3	Day 21	Taapsee Pannu and Bhumi Pednekar	To promote Saand Ki Aankh
Week 3	Day 21	Rajkummar Rao, Mouni Roy and Boman Irani	To promote Made In China
Week 4	Day 28	Haarsh Limbachiyaa	To perform some Khatra Khatra Khatra tasks
Week 4	Day 28	Aditya Narayan	To perform some Khatra Khatra Khatra tasks
Week 4	Day 28	Garvit Parekh	To perform some Khatra Khatra Khatra tasks
Week 4	Day 28	Dhinchak Pooja	To promote her song References
Week 5	Day30	Farah Khan	As a judge in the task
Week 5	Day31	Karishma Tanna	As queen in a task
Week 5	Day34	Gauhar Khan	As quality control expert to ask questions to evicted contestants
Week 5	Day34	Sanjay Dutt	As quality control expert to ask questions to evicted contestants
Week 5	Day34	Ayushman Khurana, Yami Gautam and Bhumi Pednekar	To promote Bala
Week 6	Day 41	Gautam Gulati	As Vivo Caller of the Week
Week 6	Day 41	Sooraj Pancholi	To promote Satellite Shankar
Week 6	Day 41	Ritesh Deshmukh	To promote Marjaavaan
Week 6	Day 41	Sidharth Malhotra	To promote Marjaavaan
Week 8	Day 57	Jay Bhanushali (Sidharth's friend)	To interact with Salman Khan about the housemates
Week 8	Day 57	Mahhi Vij (Rashami's friend)	To interact with Salman Khan about the housemates
Week 8	Day 57	Parag Tyagi (Shefali Jariwala's husband)	To interact with Salman Khan about the housemates
Week 8	Day 57	Akanksha Puri (Paras's girlfriend)	To interact with Salman Khan about the housemates
Week 8	Day 57	Umar Riaz (Asim's brother)	To interact with Salman Khan about the housemates
Week 8	Day 57	Rannvijay Singha	For special task
Week 9	Day 63	Ananya Panday	To promote Pati Patni Aur Woh
Week 9	Day 63	Kartik Aaryan	To promote Pati Patni Aur Woh
Week 9	Day 63	Bhumi Pednekar	To promote Pati Patni Aur Woh
Week 10	Day 70	Nia Sharma, Vijayendra Kumeria and Jasmin Bhasin	To promote Naagin- Bhagya Ka Zehreela Khel
Week 10	Day 70	Rani Mukherji	To promote Mardaani 2
Week 10	Day 70	Prabhu Deva, Saiee Manjrekar, Sonakshi Sinha, Kiccha Sudeep	To promote Dabangg 3
Week 10	Day 70	Kiara Advani	To promote Good Newwz
Week 11	Day 77	Kamya Punjabi	For special task
Week 11	Day 77	Hiten Tejwani	For special task
Week 11	Day 77	Gaurav Desai (Rashami's brother)	For special task
Week 11	Day 77	Sunil Grover	To interact with housemates
Week 12	Day 84	Mallika Sherawat	For special task
Week 13	Day 88	Jay Bhanushali, Rubina Dilaik, Arjun Bijlani, Jasmin Bhasin, Nimrit Kaur Ahluwalia	For Christmas Celebration
Week 13	Day 90	Rohit Shetty	To sort out differences between Sidharth Shukla and Asim Riaz
Week 13	Day 91	Devoleena Bhattacharjee	OMG Task
Week 14	Day 92	Sunny Leone	For Salman Khan's special birthday surprise
Week 14	Day 93	Vijayendra Kumeria, Jasmin Bhasin, Pearl V Puri, Ishita Dutta, Nimrit Kaur Ahluwalia, Avinesh Rekhi, Mahima Makwana, Akshit Sukhija, Meera Deosthale, Namish Taneja	For New Year's Eve celebration
Week 14	Day 98	Ajay Devgn	To promote Tanhaji
Week 14	Day 98	Kajol	To promote Tanhaji
Week 14	Day 98	Kangana Ranaut	To promote Panga
Week 14	Day 98	Jassi Gill	To promote Panga
Week 15	Day 103	Haarsh Limbachiyaa	For Comedy Club Task
Week 15	Day 103	Paritosh Tripathi	For Comedy Club Task
Week 15	Day 105	Deepika Padukone Vikrant Massey Lakshmi Aggarwal	To promote Chhapaak and to take Vishal, Shehnaaz, Arti, Madhurima, Shefali outside for a long drive To promote Chhapaak To complete the new year wishes of the contestants
Week 16	Day 106	Hina Khan	For Elite Club Task
Week 16	Day 109	Krushna Abhishek(Arti's brother)	To meet the housemates
Week 16	Day 109	Sanya Sharma (Mahira's mother)	To meet the housemates
Week 16	Day 109	Santokh Singh Sukh(Shehnaaz's father)	To meet the housemates
Week 16	Day 109	Parag Tyagi(Shefali Zariwala's husband)	To meet the housemates
Week 16	Day 110	Umar Riaz (Asim's Brother)	To meet the housemates
Week 16	Day 110	Rita Shukla (Sidharth's mother)	To meet the housemates
Week 16	Day 110	Ruby Chabra (Paras's mother)	To meet the housemates
Week 16	Day 110	Rashami's niece and nephew	To meet the housemates
Week 16	Day 112	Kartik Aaryan	To promote Love Aaj Kal
Week 16	Day 112	Sara Ali Khan	To promote Love Aaj Kal
Week 16	Day 112	Karan Singh Grover	For Special Task
Week 16	Day 112	Vindu Dara Singh	For Special Task
Week 16	Day 112	Gautam Gulati	For Special Task
Week 16	Day 112	Siddharth Dey and Abu Malik	For a fun task
Week 17	Day 113	Hina Khan	For Elite Club Task
Week 17	Day 119	Himesh Reshammiya	To promote Happy Hardy and Heer
Week 17	Day 119	Varun Dhawan	To promote Street Dancer 3D
Week 17	Day 119	Shraddha Kapoor	To promote Street Dancer 3D
Week 17	Day 119	Remo D'Souza	To promote Street Dancer 3D
Week 17	Day 119	Raghav Juyal	To promote Street Dancer 3D
Week 17	Day 119	Punit Pathak	To promote Street Dancer 3D
Week 17	Day 119	Salman Yusuff Khan	To promote Street Dancer 3D
Week 17	Day 119	Sushant Pujari	To promote Street Dancer 3D
Week 17	Day 119	Saif Ali Khan & Alaya Furniturewala	To promote Jawaani Jaaneman
Week 18	Day 126	Disha Patani	To promote Malang
Week 18	Day 126	Aditya Roy Kapur	To promote Malang
Week 18	Day 126	Kunal Khemu	To promote Malang
Week 18	Day 126	Anil Kapoor	To promote Malang
Week 18	Day 126	Hina Khan	To promote Hacked
Week 18	Day 126	Dhvani Bhanushali	To promote her song Na Ja Tu
Week 18	Day 126	Himanshi Khurana	Connections have came to support their favourite contestants
Week 18	Day 126	Devoleena Bhattacharjee	Connections have came to support their favourite contestants
Week 18	Day 126	Vikas Gupta	Connections have came to support their favourite contestants
Week 18	Day 126	Shefali Jariwala	Connections have came to support their favourite contestants
Week 18	Day 126	Shehbaz Badesha	Connections have came to support their favourite contestants
Week 19	Day 133	Shilpa Shetty	To promote Nikamma
Week 19	Day 133	Shirley Setia	To promote Nikamma
Week 19	Day 133	Abhimanyu Dassani	To promote Nikamma
Week 19	Day 133	Adnan Sami	To promote his single Tu Yaad Aya
Week 19	Day 133	Ayushmann Khurrana	To promote Shubh Mangal Zyada Saavdhan
Week 19	Day 133	Neena Gupta	To promote Shubh Mangal Zyada Saavdhan
Week 19	Day 133	Jitendra Kumar	To promote Shubh Mangal Zyada Saavdhan
Week 19	Day 133	Rajat Sharma	To conduct his segment Aap Ki Adalat with the host
Week 20	Day 135	Rajat Sharma	To conduct his segment Aap Ki Adalat with the housemates
Week 20	Day 137	Vicky Kaushal	For final eviction and to promote Bhoot – Part One: The Haunted Ship
Grand Finale	Day 141	Harbhajan Singh and Mohammed Kaif	Special appearance
Grand Finale	Day 141	Sunil Grover	Special appearance
Grand Finale	Day 141	Rohit Shetty	To promote Fear Factor: Khatron Ke Khiladi 10
Grand Finale	Day 141	Karishma Tanna	To promote Fear Factor: Khatron Ke Khiladi 10
Grand Finale	Day 141	Adaa Khan	To promote Fear Factor: Khatron Ke Khiladi 10
Grand Finale	Day 141	Tejasswi Prakash	To promote Fear Factor: Khatron Ke Khiladi 10
Grand Finale	Day 141	Balraj Syal	To promote Fear Factor: Khatron Ke Khiladi 10
Grand Finale	Day 141	Karan Patel	To promote Fear Factor: Khatron Ke Khiladi 10

== Weekly summary ==
The main events in the house are summarised in the table below. A typical week began with nominations, followed by the shopping task, and then the eviction of a housemate during the Sunday episode. Evictions, tasks, and other events for a particular week are noted in order of sequence.

Week 1	Entrances		On Day 1, Sidharth S, Siddharth D, Paras, Abu, Asim, Mahira, Devoleena, Rashami, Shefali B, Shehnaaz, Dalljiet, Koena and Arti entered the house.
Week 1	Nominations		For the first nomination of the season, each female housemate had a heart-shaped cushion with their picture on it. The female housemates had to give that cushion to one male housemate who they felt they had a connection with, while male housemates had to break the female contestants' hearts who they thought they did not have a connection with and put them straight to nominations. As a result, Devoleena, Rashami, Shefali B, Koena & Dalljiet were nominated for this week's nomination.
Week 1	Tasks		BB Hospital: whoever wins this task will become a queen for the first week and will control bathrooms. The house is divided into two – A and B. Team A includes Sidharth Shukla, Rashami Desai, Aarti Singh, Siddhartha Dey, Asim Riaz, and Koena Mitra while Team B has Shenaz Gill, Mahira Sharma, Devoleena Bhattacharjee, Shefali Bagga, Dalljiet Kaur, and Paras Chabbra. Abu Malik is the Dean of the hospital and has to moderate the task. Team A will be patients in the hospital and Team B will be medical staff, patients cannot walk, and staff will take them via wheelchair. When the operation theater light is on, two staff members will be called and they will be told about illness and remedy for it. Staff will choose two patients and start applying those remedies on them. If patients get up from their chairs before lights go off then staff will get 2 points but if they don't get up then they won't. Dean will decide about points. They can use other stuff of the house.; Ration Task: All housemates will have to transfer ration items by mouth. If items fall down, They cannot claim it
Week 1	Result		Winner (BB Hospital) – Team B
Week 1	Result		Failed (BB Hospital) – Team A
Week 1	Reward		Housemates got their food after successfully completing the ration task
Week 1	Notes		Since the Winning Team could not decide who will be the Queen, there will be no Queen.; Season 11 first runner up, Hina Khan entered as a guest for a task which is called BB Supermarket. Each contestant will got in the activity area and will be asked to either pick an item for the ration or hear messages from their loved ones.
Week 1	Twists		Report Card: The female housemates had to give a black ring to a male contestant who they feel is least deserving.
Week 1	Exits		There was no eviction in the first week
Week 2	Nominations		For the second nomination of the season, there were two windows in the garden area. A male contestant will have to nominate one female contestant and save the other one; As a result; Shehnaaz, Rashami, Dalljiet and Koena were nominated.
Week 2	Tasks		Rani No. 1: All girls are queens. A male contestant will have to bring their respective favourite queen so that the female contestant will break another housemate's pot to take them out of the task.; BB Fishery: The task name is ‘BB Fishery’. All 5 guys have their pools and there are 10 fish in a pool, The guys have to clean their pools and put their fish in someone else's pool, at the end of the task, the boy who has the least fish in his pool will win the task and others will be nominated. Girls will have their fish baskets and when the ship bell rings, two girls will come forward and put their fish in the guy's pool whom they want to nominate. As Devoleena is a queen, she will get two fish baskets and she will have to finish both baskets in one pool only, Devoleena will be the guardian of the task and has to make sure that there are no fish out in the pool at the end of the task.
Week 2	Result		Winner (Rani Task) – Devoleena
Week 2	Result		Failed (Rani Task) – Rest of contestants
Week 2	Result		Winner (BB Fishery) – Sidharth S
Week 2	Result		Failed (BB Fishery) – Abu, Asim, Siddharth D & Paras
Week 2	Twists		Report Card: The female housemates were each given a black ring. They then, have to give their respective rings to a male housemate who they feel is not deserving to stay in the house. But the one who has the most rings will get nominated for eviction next week.
Week 2	Exits		On Day 13, Dalljiet Kaur was evicted from the house after facing the public vote.; On Day 14, Koena Mitra was evicted from the house after facing the public vote.
Week 3	Nominations		There will be a double eviction this week also, one will be a boy and one will be a girl. The boys nominated are Abu, Paras, Siddharth D, and Asim. The task is for the girls.; As a result; Abu, Asim, Mahira, Paras, Rashami & Siddhartha D were nominated.
Week 3	House Queen		Devoleena
Week 3	Tasks	Finale Task	BB Toy Factory: Abu will be in charge. BB will give them orders from time to time, the team who completes it first will win. The team that completes more orders will win the task and one girl from their team will have a chance to win a ticket to the finale.
Week 3	Result		BB Toy Factory was cancelled by Bigg Boss
Week 3	Punishments		Jail: Bigg Boss has opened a jail; where every week contestants will need to nominate two or three inmates they think were breaking the rules, least deserving or worst performers of the recent tasks. They all nominate Sidharth S & Shehnaaz.
Week 3	Exits		On Day 23, Abu Malik was evicted from the house after facing the housemates' vote.
Week 4	Entrances		On Day 28, Hindustani Bhau, Khesari Lal Yadav & Tehseen Poonawalla entered as first, second & third wild card entrants in the secret room.
Week 4	Nominations		Rose Day: Male contestants will get to protect themselves from nominations by grabbing a rose and giving it to a girl of their choice. The girl who gets it will have the power to nominate one boy. The girl who gets the rose in 3rd round is safe from elimination.; Reader: Paras As a result; Devoleena, Mahira, Paras, Rashami, Shefali B, Shehnaaz, Siddharth D & Sidharth S were nominated.
Week 4	Tasks	Main Task	Seedhi Saanp Task: One person who will win this task will be able to save themselves from nominations and take the place of safe people right now (Asim and Arti). Nominated inmates will keep making their ladders using their clay when dice roll plays, the referee will announce the one who has the biggest ladder at that time, and that inmate will roll the dice and move a pawn on the board as per the number on the rolled dice. Arti will tell whose snake is bigger and that person will be able to go on the board and bring any inmate's pawn down. Arti will be a referee of this task too, inmates have to protect their ladders and snakes from others.
Week 4	Result		Seedhi Saanp task was cancelled after poor behaviour and physical violence by Devoleena, Sidharth S and Paras
Week 4	Exits		There was no eviction this week.
Week 5	Entrances		On Day 30, Shefali Jariwala entered as the fourth wild card entrants in the secret room.; On Day 35, Himanshi Khurana & Arhaan Khan entered as the fifth and sixth wild card entrants. Shefali J, Khesari & Tehseen entered the main house too.
Week 5	Nominations		All contestants were nominated for the first finale.
Week 5	Tasks	Main Task	BB Home Delivery: Mahira and Paras became the winners hence they both became the first two finalists.
Week 5	Tasks	Luxury Budget Task	Maharani Karishma's task: Season 8 runner-up Karishma Tanna entered the house as the Maharani to assign a new task for the contestants. She is the dictator and has to choose two guards that will protect the necklace on her statue that is placed in the garden. Other inmates will be her workers and will follow her orders but they have to keep trying to get that necklace to win the task.
Week 5	Result		Winner (BB Home Delivery) – Paras & Mahira
Week 5	Result		Failed (BB Home Delivery) – Other Contestants
Week 5	Result		Winner (Maharani Task) – Devoleena & Sidharth S
Week 5	Reward		—N/a
Week 5	Twists		Bigg Boss asks the contestants to tell who does not deserve to be here in the house. Bigg Boss had said that this was a task to announce the captain where Arti wins and becomes the new captain for next week.
Week 5	Punishments		Jail: Bigg Boss asked the contestants to choose three candidates who they want to put in jail. They choose Asim & Sidharth S.
Week 5	Exits		On Day 30, Siddharth Dey was evicted from the house after facing the public vote.; On Day 34, Devoleena Bhattacharjee, Rashami Desai & Shefali Bagga were evicted from the house after facing the public vote.
Week 6	Entrances		On Day 42, Vishal Aditya Singh entered as the seventh wild card entrants.; On Day 39, Devoleena Bhattacharjee & Rashami Desai re-entered as contestants.
Week 6	Nominations		Wild Card Entrants will nominate two old contestants and the others have to do the same. As a result; Arhaan, Mahira, Paras, Shefali J, Shehnaaz, Sidharth S & Tehseen get nominated.
Week 6	Tasks	Main Task	BB Transport Service: There will be a truck and inmates will load the things from the godown. Paras and Asim will be the referees of the task too. When the shutter of the godown opens, both teams will bring the items to their tables and put a stamp on them.
Week 6	Tasks	Captaincy Task	For captaincy, all inmates will vote and will put a stamp of rejection on the person whom they don't want to make captain. The one with fewer votes will win. Whilist Shefali J got seven votes; Himanshi got five votes hence Shefali became the captain.; Reader: Paras
Week 6	Result		Winner (BB Transport Service) – Team Asim
Week 6	Result		Failed (BB Transport Service) – Team Paras
Week 6	Result		Winner (Captaincy Task) – Shefali J
Week 6	Result		Failed (Captaincy Task) – Himanshi
Week 6	Punishments		Shehnaaz was nominated for one week for disobeying Bigg Boss Orders; Sidharth S was nominated for two weeks for physical violence.
Week 6	Exits		On Day 41, Tehseen Poonawalla was evicted from the house after facing the public vote.
Week 7	Nominations		There are two phone booths in the garden area. Bigg Boss will send two inmates from time to time and they can talk to each other for 15 minutes, person who puts the phone down first will be nominated and other will be safe. If both the inmates don't put the phone down after 15 minutes then both will become nominated. Devoleena was nominated by captain Shefali J.; As a result; Arhaan, Arti, Asim, Devoleena, Himanshi, Khesari, Mahira, Paras, Shehnaaz, Sidharth S & Vishal were nominated.
Week 7	Tasks	Main Task	Rakshas Task: There are caves made in the garden. Inmates will have to be afraid of the demons. Asim, Vishal, and Arhaan will be the demons and others will be villagers. When the buzzer plays, the demon that comes out of their cave first will be able to break the plate of one inmate. That inmate will be out of the captaincy race. At the end of the task, whoever has their plate safe will become the contender for captaincy and the demon which has broken the most plates will become the contender too.
Week 7	Tasks	Luxury Budget Task	There will be two teams in the task. There are two houses in the garden, you have to make the house and paint the papers for the house. Teams will try to stop each other from making the house. Two persons from both the teams will make the house at a time. Shefali will judge the task too, the team which makes the house more will win the task and the luxury budget items.
Week 7	Result		Winner (Rakshas Task) – Paras, Devoleena, Mahira & Vishal
Week 7	Result		Failed (Rakshas Task) – Other contestants
Week 7	Result		No task and captain as the contenders were breaking the rules
Week 7	Reward		Asim and Sidharth S got a reward after winning the pollution task and was gifted a present.
Week 7	Punishments		Jail: Bigg Boss asked the contestants to choose two candidates who they want to put in jail. They all choose Mahira and Paras.
Week 7	Exits		On Day 49, Arhaan Khan was evicted from the house after facing the public vote.
Week 8	Nominations		Inmates have to save two contestants from facing eviction. As a result; Arti, Devoleena, Khesari, Rashami, Sidharth S got nominated.
Week 8	Tasks	Main Task	Shehnaaz Ki Shaadi: Vikas P is a landlord, this house is his property, his daughters are Shehnaaz and his wife is Rashami. Shehnaaz is a spoilt brat, romantic and is very naughty. Sidharth S and Paras like her, Shehnaaz is confused about them. Whoever becomes the groom for Shehnaaz will win. At the end of the task, the winning groom's family will be a part of captaincy task.
Week 8	Tasks	Captaincy Task	All contenders – Vikas P, Shehnaaz, Sidharth S & Himanshi; will hold on to a frame and people who lose the grip will be out of the task. The one standing in the last will become the captain. Shefali J will be the judge of the task, the task will start as soon as the instructions are over.
Week 8	Result		Winner (Shehnaaz Ki Shaadi Task) – Paras (it was later changed to Sidharth's team)
Week 8	Result		Failed (Shehnaaz Ki Shaadi) – Sidharth S (after Paras lost as his team could not decide)
Week 8	Result		Winner (Captaincy Task) – Himanshi
Week 8	Result		Failed (Captaincy Task) – Vikas P, Shehnaaz & Sidharth S
Week 8	Punishments		Jail: Bigg Boss asked the contestants to choose three candidates who they want to put in jail.
Week 8	Exits		On Day 54, Khesari Lal Yadav was evicted from the house after facing the housemates vote.
Week 9	Nominations		They have to nominate two inmates for eviction. As a result; Vikas P, Asim, Himanshi, Paras, Rashami & Shefali J were nominated.
Week 9	Tasks	Main Task	BB College: Sidharth became new captain after his scooter was the only clean one.
Week 9	Tasks	Captaincy Task	BB College: Sidharth became new captain after his scooter was the only clean one.
Week 9	Tasks	Luxury Budget Task	
Week 9	Tasks	Other Tasks	There was a hit TV show named Dil Se Dil Tak. Bigg Boss wants to re-create that trailer of the show in the house. First, it will be re-created by Sidharth S and Rashami and then with Vishal and Mahira. Shehnaaz will direct Rashami and Sidharth's video and Paras will shoot for Mahira and Vishal. They have one hour. In the end, Himanshi will take their photo.
Week 9	Result		Winner (BB College) – Sidharth S
Week 9	Result		Failed (BB College) – Other Contestants
Week 9	Result		Winner (Luxury Budget Task) – Team B
Week 9	Result		Failed (Luxury Budget Task) – Team A
Week 9	Result		Winner (Video Task) – Rashami & Sidharth S
Week 9	Result		Failed (Video Task) – Mahira & Vishal
Week 9	Punishments		Jail: Bigg Boss asked the contestants to choose three candidates who they want to put in jail. They chose Asim and Paras
Week 9	Exits		On Day 63, Devoleena Bhattacharjee exit the show as an emergency due to her back injury.
Week 10	Entrances		On Day 65, Arhaan Khan & Shefali Bagga re-entered the house as contestants. Madhurima Tuli entered as eighth wild card entrant.; On Day 71, Season 11 second runner up Vikas Gupta entered as a guest and a proxy for Devoleena Bhattacharjee where he is playing on her behalf.
Week 10	Nominations		Sidharth S will run the nominations task. Shefali B, Arhaan, Madhurima were safe as they were the new contestants, Shehnaaz also was declared Safe by Bigg Boss as Majority Housemates chose her as the entertainer of the Season. Sidharth S is also safe as He is the House Captain. Bigg Boss will call some inmates and Sidharth S have to choose one from them to nominate. As a result; Vikas P, Asim, Himanshi, Paras, Rashami & Shefali J were nominated.
Week 10	Tasks	Main Task	BB Railway Station: The garden is turned into a railway station. When buzzer plays, they have to take luggage of the other inmate and have to get on the train when it is on the junction. The person who enters the train last will show the bag of the inmate that he/she has and that person will be eliminated from the captaincy. When alarm plays, they all have to get down from the train, the last one to get out will show the bag he/she has will be eliminated too. So each round will eliminate two inmates from the race.
Week 10	Tasks	Captaincy Task	
Week 10	Result		Bigg Boss cancelled the task due to aggression and said there is no captain for next week.
Week 10	Reward		After many named Shehnaaz name as the entertainer of this season, she was given immunity for this week and was saved from nominations.
Week 10	Punishments		Bigg Boss punished Sidharth S for pushing Asim and nominated him for two weeks.
Week 10	Exits		On Day 67, Paras Chhabra exit the show after his finger injury that needs medical treatment.; On Day 70, Himanshi Khurana was evicted from the house after facing the housemates vote against Shefali J. Later Sidharth Shukla was asked to leave the house for medical treatment for his typhoid but was sent to the secret room.
Week 11	Entrances		Paras Chhabra re-entered the house as a contestant and was in the secret room with Sidharth S.
Week 11	Nominations		In this week nomination task, all housemates will go to confession room one by one and will nominate two people for eviction. Sidharth S is already nominated as a punishment. As a result; Madhurima, Shehnaaz, Sidharth S & Vikas P were nominated. Paras and Sidharth S saved Mahira from nominations.
Week 11	Tasks	Main Task	BB Post Office: They all have got letters from their families but if they get that or not, it will be decided by a task. The task name is BB Post office. This task will decide about the captaincy too. Rashami, Shehnaaz, Mahira, Asim, Arti, Shefali J & Vikas P's post box are made in the garden. There are letters from their families in the post box but empty letters are there too. If he or she does not tear it and give it to the person who got that letter then no one will win the contender position for captaincy.
Week 11	Tasks	Captaincy Task	Asim, Rashami, Shefali J & Vikas G will get the tasks from their earpiece. They have to do all the tasks given to them, the person who performs the best will win the task and become the captain. You won't tell about your task to anyone. You have to keep wearing the earpiece. Paras and Sidharth S will give the tasks but the contenders or other housemates don't know its them. Later Bigg Boss asked Paras & Sidharth S to announce the new captain and the chose Vikas G.
Week 11	Tasks	Luxury Budget Task	Paras and Asim will be sellers in the task and Vikas G will be the judge and he can use the items earned. Vishal and Shefali B won't be part of this task. Other inmates will get 5000 points each, they have to bargain from the sellers.
Week 11	Result		Winner (BB Post Office) – Asim, Rashami, Shefali J & Vikas G
Week 11	Result		Failed (BB Post Office) – Rest of contestants
Week 11	Result		Winner (Captaincy Task) – Vikas G
Week 11	Result		Failed (Captaincy Task) – Asim, Rashami & Shefali J
Week 11	Result		Winner (Luxury Budget Task) – Paras
Week 11	Result		Failed (Luxury Budget Task) – Asim
Week 11	Punishments		Jail: Bigg Boss asked the contestants to choose two candidates who they want to put in jail. They all chose Shefali B & Vishal.
Week 11	Exits		On Day 71, Sidharth Shukla made an exit due to his condition of typhoid was getting worse and needed medical treatment. Bigg Boss said he is still a part of the show but needs to go straight to the hospital.; On Day 78, Vikas P got evicted by the public vote
Week 12	Entrances		On Day 79, Sidharth re entered the house.
Week 12	Nominations		Vikas G is a captain so no one will nominate him. Sidharth S is already nominated because of pushing Asim. They have to call the person out whom they want to nominate and break the bottle on their head. As a result; Arhaan, Arti, Asim, Madhurima, Shefali B, Sidharth S & Vishal are nominated.
Week 12	Tasks	Main Task	Mere Billi Mujhe Se Meow: A cat is sleeping, she will wake up and will eat the rats one by one. All inmates are rats. Sidharth S won't participate in this task but will be the judge. Bigg Boss have made two nests for both the teams. When the cat is sleeping, both teams will try to control the rat. The two inmates will try to put their bell around the cat's neck. When the cat wakes up, the team whose bell is around the cat's neck will be safe and they will enter their nest. Rashami and Paras are hurt so they will not try to put the bell around the cat.
Week 12	Tasks	Captaincy Task	Arti, Shefali J, Asim, Arhaan, Vishal & Madhurima will have a competition. Other inmates will decide who will become the captain. There are 4 cars in the garden area. They will be driven by Mahira, Shefali B, Shehnaaz and Vikas G. The contenders will become the passengers. The drivers will give rides to the contenders. The car that reaches the parking lot, in the end, will be out of the task. Inmates will put no parking board there. Sid will be a referee of the task. Paras and Rashami are hurt so they cannot play.
Week 12	Result		Winner (Mere Billi Mujhe Se Meow) – Arti, Shefali J, Arhaan, Asim, Vishal & Madhurima
Week 12	Result		Failed (Mere Billi Mujhe Se Meow) – Other contestants
Week 12	Result		Winner (Captaincy Task) – Asim
Week 12	Result		Failed (Captaincy Task) – Arti
Week 12	Exits		On Day 84, Salman Khan announced that there is no eviction.
Week 13	Nominations		As there was no eviction last week; the nominations from last week carried out forward for this week. As a result; Arhaan, Arti, Madhurima, Shefali B, Sidharth S & Vishal were nominated.
Week 13	Tasks	Main Task	Mission Mangal Grah: There are 6 pits filled with water, all scientists will be tied to robots and will have to fill their container from the pits. The scientist who has their robot with them till the end will become the contender as well.
Week 13	Tasks	Captaincy Task	Shehnaaz & Vishal will enter a brain house when the brain wakes up and it will give an instruction to Vishal and Shehnaaz. Shehnaaz and Vishal will have to make the inmates agree to do that task for them, whoever gets more tasks done will win.
Week 13	Tasks	Luxury Budget Task	There will be a feast challenge.; Asim will be a referee too. Both team have a stall where they will cook and sell. Two members from both the teams will be cooks, you have to use sauces in three dishes. When the doorbell rings, the guests will enter and you will have to make food for them, they will have 10K each and you have to earn money from the guests. The winning team will get a surprise. The team of Sidharth S, Paras, Mahira, Shefali J, Arti and Shehnaaz
Week 13	Result		Winner (Mission Mangal Grah) – Shehnaaz & Vishal
Week 13	Result		Failed (Mission Mangal Grah) – Other contestants
Week 13	Result		Winner (Captaincy Task) – Shehnaaz
Week 13	Result		Failed (Captaincy Task) – Vishal
Week 13	Result		Winner (Luxury Budget Task) – Team A
Week 13	Result		Failed (Luxury Budget Task) – Team B
Week 13	Exits		On Day 87, Vikas Gupta's duration of being a guest contestant completed and he left the house while it was said by Bigg Boss that Devoleena Bhattacherjee is not returning as well.; On Day 92, Arhaan Khan was evicted from the house after facing the public vote.
Week 14	Nominations		Contestants will nominate two inmates by applying a red stamp on their faces. Shehnaaz is a captain so she cannot be nominated. As a result; Madhurima, Mahira, Rashami, Shefali B, Shefali J & Vishal were nominated.
Week 14	Tasks	Main Task	The inmates have to win the luxury task to become captains.; Madhurima will be a referee. There are 2 baskets per team. The two inmates from each team will wear these baskets on their backs and roam around in the house. There are treasure chests in the house where we will send the blocks. Other team can steal the blocks. The team who gets more blocks will win the items written on the boxes and also become the captaincy contenders.
Week 14	Tasks	Captaincy Task	The inmates have to win the luxury task to become captains.; Madhurima will be a referee. There are 2 baskets per team. The two inmates from each team will wear these baskets on their backs and roam around in the house. There are treasure chests in the house where we will send the blocks. Other team can steal the blocks. The team who gets more blocks will win the items written on the boxes and also become the captaincy contenders.
Week 14	Tasks	Luxury Budget Task	The inmates have to win the luxury task to become captains.; Madhurima will be a referee. There are 2 baskets per team. The two inmates from each team will wear these baskets on their backs and roam around in the house. There are treasure chests in the house where we will send the blocks. Other team can steal the blocks. The team who gets more blocks will win the items written on the boxes and also become the captaincy contenders.
Week 14	Result		BB rejected the main and luxury task
Week 14	Exits		On Day 98, Shefali Bagga was evicted from the house after facing the housemates vote.
Week 15	Nominations		Bigg Boss nominated all the housemates for this week.
Week 15	Tasks	Main Task	They will decide about each other as each inmate will get a photo of another inmate. If you don't want them to become the captain then you can burn it.; There will be 5 buzzers and whoever keeps their photos saved will become the contenders. Till 4th buzzer, the two persons who enter the box first will get the chance.
Week 15	Tasks	Captaincy Task	They will decide about each other as each inmate will get a photo of another inmate. If you don't want them to become the captain then you can burn it.; There will be 5 buzzers and whoever keeps their photos saved will become the contenders. Till 4th buzzer, the two persons who enter the box first will get the chance.
Week 15	Result		Task Rejected
Week 15	Exits		On Day 105, there was no eviction.
Week 16	Nominations		All are nominated.
Week 16	Tasks	Main Task	Family Task: There is a magician in the garden, she will take your test by bribing you. Shehnaaz, Arti, Mahira and Shefali J will be kidnapped by the magician, they will be locked in the stands and they cannot even look back. When door bell rings, a temptation related to the prisoner will come and if the prisoner opens her lock to meet that person then that prisoner will be out of the task but if she does not open the lock then she will become the contender for captaincy. Paras, Rashami, Sidharth S, Asim will freeze when temptation come in the house. Vishal and Madhurima won't be a part of this task as they are punished by Bigg Boss. Paras, Rashami, Sidharth S, Asim will also be locked as well after.
Week 16	Tasks	Captaincy Task	
Week 16	Tasks	Luxury Budget Task	Team A will be Mahira, Paras, Vishal and Madhurima. Team B will have Shehnaaz, Rashami, Asim and Sidharth S. Arti and Shefali J will be judges. Both the teams will make ads for Kurkure. Mahira and Sana will be Miss. Kurkure from their teams, they will lead the team.
Week 16	Tasks	Elite Club Task	Hina Khan came to assign the elite club task where the winner will get an immunity and will be able to stay in a room. The two contestants who are chosen are Asim & Shehnaaz. Arti & Rashami will be their witnesses and will fight for them. The winner will wear a jacket.
Week 16	Result		No captain as they lost the task
Week 16	Result		Winner (Luxury Budget Task) – Team A
Week 16	Result		Failed (Luxury Budget Task) – Team B
Week 16	Result		Winner (Elite Club Task) – Asim
Week 16	Result		Failed (Elite Club Task) – Shehnaaz
Week 16	Punishments		Madhurima and Vishal were punished and asked to stay in jail and also was not allowed to take part in the family task.
Week 16	Exits		On Day 113, Madhurima Tuli was asked to leave the house after she violently hit Vishal during this week which was against the rules.
Week 17	Nominations		There are pawns of every inmate on a board in the garden. After some moves, the pawns can enter the safe zone. There will be 5 buzzers and inmates will move pawns of another inmate with a reason. They will move the pawns whom you want to save in the nominations. As a result; Arti, Asim, Mahira, Paras, Rashami, Shefali J and Vishal were nominated.
Week 17	Tasks	Main Task	There is a spider and all inmates have their baskets, each round spider will give eggs. The inmates have to collect the eggs in their baskets. The person who has the most eggs will win that round, then that inmate will eliminate one person from the task. Then the next round will start and the inmates will have to empty their baskets. They cannot keep the eggs anywhere else, they cannot put a cap on their baskets. Whoever loses the task first will become the referee of this task. Sidharth S and Asim were not allowed to participate in the task due to physical violence in the previous day. This task was rejected because of Vishal.; Reader: Shefali J
Week 17	Tasks	BB Elite Club Task	There are 3 horses and any three inmates can sit at the start. When the buzzer plays, they can change the place on the horse. There will be 4 buzzers and each time, the inmates on the horses will mutually decide who will go down and who will take their place. At the end of the task, the three inmates on the horses will become a member of the elite club. Asim is already a member so he is not a part of this task and will be a referee in this task. At the end Arti, Mahira & Rashami are the contenders.; Season 11 finalist Hina Khan has come to decide the winner along. At the end Hina decided not to give the membership to either of them as they both worked hard and it will be unfair so it was rejected.: Varun Dhawan & Shraddha Kapoor came to promote their new film but also assigned a new task for the elite membership. They will need to be in pairs and need to say who does not deserve to be here.; There for Mahira, Paras, Sidharth S & Arti are the remaining to participate for the task. At the end Sidharth is the winner.
Week 17	Result		Captaincy Task rejected because of Vishal
Week 17	Result		Hina rejected the elite club membership
Week 17	Result		Winner (Elite Task P2) – Sidharth S
Week 17	Result		Failed (Elite Task P2) – Mahira, Paras & Arti
Week 17	Reward		—N/a
Week 17	Twists		—N/a
Week 17	Punishments		As a result of Back to Back cancellation of Tasks, Bigg Boss announced that There will be no immunity tasks for the rest of the season Bigg Boss asked the inmates to choose two people who is the reason behind the tasks getting rejected. Majority said Paras and Vishal therefore Bigg Boss punished Paras and Vishal and said that they will be servants of inmates.
Week 17	Exits		On Day Day 119, Shefali Jariwala was evicted from the house after facing the public vote.
Week 18	Nominations		Bigg Boss will call the contestants in a dome. They will have to count the seconds and when they think 17 minutes have finished then they have to press the buzzer and come out. The 5 inmates whose idea is worse about the 17 minutes will lose and will be nominated. The other inmates will try to distract the inmate in the dome so they can lose the track of time. You all have to make sure to be attentive about time.; Arti: 13 Mins and 24 Secs (3 Mins and 36 Secs early); Asim: 17 Mins and 46 Secs (46 Seconds late); Mahira: 20 Mins and 26 Secs (3 Mins and 26 secs late); Paras: 20 Mins and 28 Secs (3 Mins and 28 secs late); Rashami: 18 Mins and 11 Secs (1 Min and 11 secs late; Shehnaaz: 24 Mins and 35 Secs (7 Mins and 35 secs late); Sidharth S: 24 Mins and 31 Secs (7 Mins and 31 secs late); Vishal: 33 Mins and 39 Secs (16 Mins and 39 Secs late); As a result; Arti, Shehnaaz, Sidharth S & Vishal were nominated.
Week 18	Tasks	Main Task	Bigg Boss has sent in some connections of the inmates who will decide who will be the new captain of the house.; Sidharth is the new captain. Captaincy Task Part 2: The house has a note printing factory. All the inmates will be workers who will print the notes. They will fill the bags and one worker will stand on a platform when the buzzer and throws the notes on the other side of the wall. The connections will have to get the notes and save it in their safes. The one with the most notes at the end of the round will take out one inmate from the task. There is no new captain for next week as the task was rejected after Himanshi was hurt.
Week 18	Tasks	Captaincy Task	
Week 18	Result		Winner (Captaincy Task) – Sidharth S
Week 18	Result		The phone task got rejected
Week 18	Twists		Shahbaz & Vikas got a power to save someone from nominations and getting evicted. They chose Arti so she is saved.
Week 18	Exits		On Day 127, Vishal Aditya Singh was evicted from the house after facing the public vote.
Week 19	Entrances		—N/a
Week 19	Nominations		Bigg Boss has nominated all of the contestants but later in order to save themselves they will need to do a task. They can keep their necks out of the shell only. Sid, Asim, and Rashami will try to bring the inmates out of the shells. At the end of the task, if all inmates are out of the shells then elite club members will be safe but if the inmates remain in the shells then they will be able to take any member's immunity from the club. Rashami will be the referee of the task too. As a result; Arti, Mahira, Paras & Shehnaaz get nominated.
Week 19	Tasks	Main Task	BB Media & Elite Task: Reporters from different media platforms have come to the house to ask questions to the ten contestants. At the end the reporters decide to give Rashami the winning tag and she becomes a member of the elite club and is saved.; Immunity Task: One more inmate will be able to secure a position in the finale. There are two jails in the garden area. One jail will have Paras and Mahira and other jail will have Shehnaaz and Arti. There is an immunity card but they have cross 5 locked doors to get to the card. Asim, Rashami and Sidharth S will have to get the keys when the buzzer plays. They can open the locked door for any inmate that they want to give immunity too. The inmate who is able to open the 5 doors first will win the immunity.
Week 19	Result		Winner (Elite Task) – Rashami
Week 19	Result		Failed (Elite Task) – Arti, Shehnaaz, Mahira & Paras
Week 19	Result		Winner (Immunity Task) – Paras
Week 19	Result		Failed (Immunity Task) – Arti, Mahira & Shehnaaz
Week 19	Exits		On Day 133, Salman Khan said there was no eviction this week.
Week 20
Week 20	Tasks		BB Secret Task: Paras comes to the storeroom. Bigg Boss gives him a secret task in which a guest will give him some tasks on a microphone and he will have to make the inmates believe that there is a ghost in the house. Paras can involve Sidharth with him. He successful in this task
Week 20	Result		Winner – Paras
Week 20	Happenings		Day 133 : Weekend Ka Vaar continues with Salman Khan. Mahira-Asim is given a task.; Day 134: Ayushmann Khurrana has come to promote his upcoming film. Adnan Sami also came.; Day 135: Rajat Sharma has come to the house with the task names Rajat Ki Adalat. He gives some questions and accusations to the contestants.; Day 136: The Rajat ki Aadalat continued. Paras got a secret task; Day 137: Vicky Kaushal came to promote his next film and announce the final eviction. Also Bigg Boss had shown the journeys of the finalists which started with Arti & Sidharth S.; Day 137: Rashami, Asim, Paras & Shehnaaz's journeys are also shown.; Day 139: The grand finale aired with Sidharth S as the winner of the show.
Week 20	Exit		On Day 137, Mahira Sharma was evicted from the house after facing the public vote.
Week 20	Finalists		
Week 20	Winner		Sidharth Shukla
Week 20	1st Runner Up		Asim Riaz
Week 20	2nd Runner Up		Shehnaaz Gill
Week 20	3rd Runner Up		Rashami Desai
Week 20	4th Runner Up		Arti Singh
Week 20	5th Runner Up, Walked		Paras Chhabra

== Nominations table ==
First level	Week 1	Week 2	Week 3		Week 4		Week 5			Next level	Week 6	Week 7	Week 8		Week 9	Week 10			Week 11	Week 12	Week 13	Week 14		Week 15	Week 16	Week 17	Week 18		Week 19	Week 20			
First level	Week 1	Week 2	Day 16	Day 22	Day 24	Day 26	Day 30	Day 33	Day 34	Next level	Week 6	Week 7	Day 50	Day 54	Week 9	Day 63	Day 64	Day 70	Week 11	Week 12	Week 13	Day 93	Day 98	Week 15	Week 16	Week 17	Day 128	Day 131	Week 19	Day 137	Day 141		
Nominees for Queen	None	Dalljiet; Devoleena; Mahira; Shefali B Shehnaaz	Arti; Dalljiet; Devoleena; Koena; Mahira; Rashami; Shefali B Shehnaaz	None						Nominees for Captaincy	Arhaan; Arti; Asim; Himanshi; Khesari; Mahira; Paras; Shefali J Shehnaaz; Sidharth S Tehseen; Vikas F	Himanshi; Shefali J	Devoleena; Mahira; Paras; Vishal		Himanshi; Shehnaaz; Sidharth S Vikas F	Asim; Sidharth S Vishal		Arhaan; Arti; Asim; Madhurima; Mahira; Paras; Rashami; Shefali B Shefali J Shehnaaz; Vikas F		Asim; Rashami; Shefali J Vikas G	Arhaan; Asim; Arti; Madhurima; Shefali J Vishal	Shehnaaz; Vishal	Madhurima		All Housemates	Arti; Asim; Mahira; Paras; Rashami; Shefali J Shehnaaz; Sidharth S	Arti; Asim; Mahira; Paras; Rashami; Shefali J Shehnaaz; Sidharth S Vishal	Arti Asim; Mahira; Paras; Rashami; Shehnaaz; Vishal		None			
House Queen	No; Queen		Devoleena	No; Queen						House Captain	Arti	Shefali J	No; Captain		Himanshi	Sidharth S		No; Captain		Vikas G	Asim	Shehnaaz	No; Captain					Sidharth S		None			
Queen's Nominations	No; Queen		No; Nominations	No; Queen						Captain's Nominations	Asim (to save)	Devoleena (to evict)	No; Captain		Mahira	Shehnaaz (to save)	Asim; Shefali J Himanshi; Rashami; Paras (to evict)	No; Captain		Asim	Not eligible	Rashami	No; Captain					24:31 Mins	Not eligible	None			
Queen's Nominations	No; Queen		No; Nominations	No; Queen						Nominees For Elite Club Membership	Not eligible														Asim; Shehnaaz	Arti; ~~Mahira~~; Rashami	Arti; Mahira; Paras; Sidharth S		Arti; Mahira; Paras; Rashami; Shehnaaz	None			
Queen's Nominations	No; Queen		No; Nominations	No; Queen						Elite Club Members	Not eligible														Asim	No Elite Club Members	Sidharth S		Rashami	None			
Jail Nominations	No Jail; Punishment		Shehnaaz; Sidharth S	No Jail; Punishment			Asim; Sidharth S			Jail Nominations	No Jail; Punishment	Mahira; Paras	No Jail; Punishment		Asim; Paras	No Jail; Punishment			Shefali B Vishal	No Jail; Punishment					Madhurima; Vishal	Jail Tasks Ended							
Vote to	Evict		Task	Evict		None		Task	1st Finale	Vote to	Evict	Save / Evict	Save	Evict		Save	Evict	Save	Evict	Evict	None	Evict		None		Save	17-Min	Save	Task		WIN		
Sidharth S	Devoleena	Rashami	Safe	Not eligible	Not eligible	No; Nominations	Safe	Nominated	Moved to Next Level	Sidharth S	Arhaan; Khesari	Nominated	Asim; Shehnaaz	Khesari	Rashami; Shefali J	House; Captain		Shefali J	Nominated	Shefali J Vishal	Nominated	Shefali B Vishal	Shefali B	No; Nominations	No; Nominations	Arti	Elite Club; Member		Safe	Safe	No; Nominations	Winner (Day 141)	
Sidharth S	Devoleena	Rashami	Safe	Not eligible	Not eligible	No; Nominations	Safe	Nominated	Moved to Next Level	Sidharth S	Arhaan; Khesari	Nominated	Asim; Shehnaaz	Khesari	Rashami; Shefali J	House; Captain		Shefali J	Secret Room (Days 71–75)	Shefali J Vishal	Nominated	Shefali B Vishal	Shefali B	No; Nominations	No; Nominations	Arti	Elite Club; Member		Safe	Safe	No; Nominations	Winner (Day 141)	
Sidharth S	Devoleena	Rashami	Safe	Not eligible	Not eligible	No; Nominations	Safe	Nominated	Moved to Next Level	Sidharth S	Arhaan; Khesari	Nominated	Asim; Shehnaaz	Khesari	Rashami; Shefali J	House; Captain		Shefali J	Walked (Day 75)	Shefali J Vishal	Nominated	Shefali B Vishal	Shefali B	No; Nominations	No; Nominations	Arti	House; Captain		Safe	Safe	No; Nominations	Winner (Day 141)	
Asim	Not eligible	Koena	Nominated	Not eligible	Not eligible	No; Nominations	Safe	Nominated	Moved to Next Level	Asim	Arhaan; Tehseen	Arhaan (to evict)	Himanshi; Vikas P	Khesari	Paras; Shehnaaz	Sidharth S	Nominated by Captain	Himanshi	Mahira; Shefali B	Arti; Madhurima	House; Captain	Mahira; Shefali J	Shefali B	No; Nominations	Elite Club Member	Shehnaaz	17:46 Mins	Not eligible	Safe	Safe	No; Nominations	1st runner-up (Day 141)	
Shehnaaz	Not eligible	Not eligible	Safe	Siddhartha	Not eligible	No; Nominations	Safe	Nominated	Moved to Next Level	Shehnaaz	Shefali J Vikas P	Nominated	Himanshi; Paras	Rashami	Arti; Shefali J	Paras	Safe	Himanshi	Madhurima; Vikas P	Arti; Madhurima	Safe	House Captain	Madhurima	No; Nominations	No; Nominations	Sidharth S	24:35 Mins	Nominated	Nominated	Nominated	No; Nominations	2nd runner-up (Day 141)	
Rashami	Not eligible	Not eligible	Nominated	Abu	Not eligible	No; Nominations	Safe	Nominated	Rejected	Rashami	Evicted (Day 34)	Saved by Paras	Devoleena; Vikas P	Khesari	Shehnaaz; Vikas P	Shehnaaz	Nominated by Captain	Shefali J	Mahira; Shehnaaz	Mahira; Vikas	Safe	Mahira; Shefali J	Shefali B	No; Nominations	No; Nominations	Shehnaaz	18:11 Mins	Not eligible	Elite Club Member	Safe	No; Nominations	3rd runner-up (Day 141)	
Arti	Not eligible	Not eligible	Safe	Siddhartha D	Paras; Siddhartha D	No; Nominations	BTM 3	Nominated	Moved to Next Level	Arti	House; Captain	Mahira (to evict)	Shefali J Shehnaaz	Khesari	Paras; Vishal	Sidharth S	Saved by Captain	Shefali J	Shehnaaz; Vikas P	Arhaan; Shefali B	Nominated	Madhurima; Shefali B	Shefali B	No; Nominations	No; Nominations	Sidharth S	13:24 Mins	Saved by Shehbaz & Vikas G	Nominated	Nominated	No; Nominations	4th runner-up (Day 141)	
Paras	Rashami; Shefali B Koena; Dalljiet	Shehnaaz	Nominated	Not eligible	Not eligible	No; Nominations	Safe	Safe	Moved to Next Level	Paras	Himanshi; Shefali J	Rashami (to save)	Khesari; Mahira	Rashami	Arti; Shefali J	Shehnaaz	Nominated by Captain	Walked (Day 67)	Secret Room (Days 71–73)	Arhaan; Vishal	Safe	Madhurima; Shefali B	Shefali B	No; Nominations	No; Nominations	Sidharth S	20:28 Mins	Not eligible	Saved by Sidharth S	Safe	No; Nominations	Walked, 5th runner-up (Day 141)	
Mahira	Not eligible	Not eligible	Nominated	Abu	Sidharth S	No; Nominations	BTM 3	Safe	Moved to Next Level	Mahira	Shefali J Tehseen	Arti (to evict)	Paras; Vishal	Rashami	Arti; Shefali J	Paras	Saved by Captain	Shefali J	Madhurima; Vikas P	Arhaan; Madhurima	Safe	Madhurima; Shefali B	Shefali B	No; Nominations	No; Nominations	Paras	20:26 Mins	Not eligible	Nominated	Nominated	Evicted (Day 137)		
Vishal	Entered Next Level									Vishal	Not In House	Vikas P (to save)	Mahira; Shehnaaz	Rashami	Shefali J Vikas P	Shehnaaz	Saved by Captain	Shefali J	Mahira; Shehnaaz	Arhaan; Shefali B	Nominated	Mahira; Shefali J	Shefali B	No; Nominations	No; Nominations	Shehnaaz	33:39 Mins	Nominated	Evicted (Day 127)				
Shefali J	Entered Next Level								Secret Room	Shefali J	Paras; Shehnaaz	House; Captain	Arti; Himanshi	Khesari	Paras; Shehnaaz	Shehnaaz	Nominated by Captain	BTM 2	Mahira; Shehnaaz	Paras; Madhurima	Safe	Madhurima; Vishal	Shefali B	No; Nominations	No; Nominations	Mahira	Evicted (Day 119)						
Madhurima	Entered Next Level									Madhurima	Not In House						Safe	Shefali J	Mahira; Shehnaaz	Paras; Shefali B	Nominated	Arti; Mahira	BTM 2	No; Nominations	No; Nominations	Ejected (Day 111)							
Shefali B	Not eligible	Not eligible	Safe	Abu	Not eligible	No; Nominations	Safe	Nominated	Rejected	Shefali B	Evicted (Day 34)						Safe	Shefali J	Arti; Mahira	Arti; Madhurima	Nominated	Mahira; Paras	BTM 2	Evicted by Housemates (Day 98)									
Arhaan	Entered Next Level									Arhaan	Asim; Sidharth S	Asim (to evict)	Evicted (Day 49)				Safe	Himanshi	Mahira; Shehnaaz	Arti; Paras	Nominated	Evicted (Day 92)											
Devoleena	Not eligible	Not eligible	House; Queen	Abu	Not eligible	No; Nominations	Safe	Nominated	Rejected	Devoleena	Evicted (Day 34)	Nominated by Captain	Rashami; Shefali J	Khesari	Shehnaaz; Vikas P	Walked (Day 62)		Vikas G	Entered as proxy	House; Captain	Safe	Duration Complete / Left (Day 87)											
Vikas P	Entered Next Level								Secret Room	Vikas P	Mahira; Shehnaaz	Saved by Vishal	Himanshi; Shefali J	Khesari	Devoleena; Rashami	Sidharth S	Saved by Captain	Shefali J	Not eligible	Evicted (Day 77)													
Himanshi	Entered Next Level									Himanshi	Paras; Shehnaaz	Khesari (to evict)	Asim; Shefali J	Khesari	House; Captain	Shehnaaz	Nominated by Captain	BTM 2	Evicted by Housemates (Day 70)														
Khesari	Entered Next Level								Secret Room	Khesari	Asim; Sidharth S	Himanshi (to evict)	Mahira; Vishal	Rashami	Evicted by Housemates (Day 54)																		
Tehseen	Entered Next Level								Secret Room	Tehseen	Asim; Mahira	Evicted (Day 41)																					
Siddhartha D	Not eligible	Dalljiet	Nominated	BTM 2	Not eligible	No; Nominations	BTM 3	Evicted (Day 30)		Siddhartha D	Evicted in First level																						
Abu	Not eligible	Koena	Nominated	BTM 2	Evicted by Housemates (Day 22)					Abu	Evicted by Housemates in First level																						
Koena	Not eligible	Not eligible	Evicted (Day 14)							Koena	Evicted in First level																						
Dalljiet	Not eligible	Not eligible	Evicted (Day 13)							Dalljiet	Evicted in First level																						
Notes	1,2	1	3	4	None					Notes	None		5, 6	5,7		8	9,10		11	12,13,14,15,16		None	17,18	None	19	20	20,21,22	None	23		24,25	None	
Against Public Vote	Dalljiet; Devoleena; Koena; Rashami; Shefali B	Dalljiet; Koena; Rashami; Shehnaaz	Abu; Asim; Mahira; Paras; Rashami; Siddhartha D	Abu; Siddhartha D	Devoleena; Mahira; Paras; Rashami; Shefali; Shehnaaz; Siddhartha D Sidharth S	Arti; Asim; Devoleena; Mahira; Paras; Rashami; Shefali B Shehnaaz; Siddhartha D Sidharth S	Arti; Mahira; Siddhartha D	Arti Asim Devoleena; Mahira Paras Rashami Shehnaaz Shefali B Sidharth S	Arti Asim Devoleena Rashami Shefali B Shehnaaz Sidharth S	Against Public Vote	Arhaan; Mahira; Paras; Shefali J Shehnaaz; Sidharth S Tehseen	Arhaan; Arti; Asim; Devoleena; Himanshi; Khesari; Mahira; Paras; Shehnaaz; Sidharth S Vishal	Arti; Devoleena; Khesari; Rashami; Sidharth S		Arti; Mahira; Paras; Shefali J Shehnaaz; Vikas P	Asim; Himanshi; ~~Paras~~; Rashami; Shefali J		Himanshi; Shefali J	Madhurima; Shehnaaz; Sidharth S Vikas P	Arhaan; Arti; Asim; Madhurima; Shefali B Sidharth S Vishal	Arhaan; Arti; Madhurima; Shefali B Sidharth S Vishal	Madhurima; Mahira; Rashami; Shefali B Shefali J Vishal	Madhurima; Shefali B	Arti; Asim; Madhurima; Mahira; Paras; Rashami; Shefali J Shehnaaz; Sidharth S Vishal	Arti; Asim; Madhurima; Mahira; Paras; Rashami; Shefali J Shehnaaz; Sidharth S Vishal	Arti; Asim; Mahira; Paras; Rashami; Shefali J Vishal	~~Arti~~; Shehnaaz; Sidharth S Vishal		Arti; ~~Asim~~; Mahira; ~~Paras~~; ~~Rashami~~; Shehnaaz; ~~Sidharth S~~	Arti; Mahira; Shehnaaz	Arti; Asim; Paras; Rashami; Shehnaaz; Sidharth S		
Re-entered	None									Re-entered	Devoleena	None				Arhaan			Paras	Sidharth S	None												
Re-entered	None									Re-entered	Rashami	None				Shefali B			Paras	Sidharth S	None												
Secret Room	None								Vikas P	Secret Room	None								Sidharth S	None													
Secret Room	None								Tehseen	Secret Room	None								Sidharth S	None													
Secret Room	None								Shefali J	Secret Room	None								Paras	None													
Secret Room	None								Khesari	Secret Room	None								Paras	None													
Guest	None									Guest	None								Vikas G			None											
Left	None									Left	None										Vikas G	None											
Walked	None									Walked	None				Devoleena	Paras			Sidharth S	None													
Ejected	None									Ejected	None														Madhurima	None							
Evicted	No; Eviction	Dalljiet	Abu		No; Eviction		Siddhartha D	Devoleena		Evicted	Tehseen	Arhaan	Khesari		No; Eviction	Himanshi			Vikas P	No; Eviction	Arhaan	Shefali B		No; Eviction		Shefali J	Vishal		No; Eviction	Mahira	Paras	Arti	Rashami
Evicted	No; Eviction	Dalljiet	Abu		No; Eviction		Siddhartha D	Rashami		Evicted	Tehseen	Arhaan	Khesari		No; Eviction	Himanshi			Vikas P	No; Eviction	Arhaan	Shefali B		No; Eviction		Shefali J	Vishal		No; Eviction	Mahira	Shehnaaz	Asim	
Evicted	No; Eviction	Koena	Abu		No; Eviction		Siddhartha D	Shefali B		Evicted	Tehseen	Arhaan	Khesari		No; Eviction	Himanshi			Vikas P	No; Eviction	Arhaan	Shefali B		No; Eviction		Shefali J	Vishal		No; Eviction	Mahira	Sidharth S		

Color key

indicates that the Housemate was directly nominated for eviction.
indicates that the Housemate was immune prior to nominations.
indicates the contestant has been evicted.
indicates the contestant walked out.
indicates that the Housemate has been evicted by Housemates.
indicates the contestant has been ejected by bigg boss.
indicates that the housemate has re-entered.
indicates the house captain.
indicates the House Queen.

=== Nomination notes ===
- ^Note 1: Only male housemates were eligible to nominate.
- ^Note 2: The Voting Lines were closed for the week.
- ^Note 3: Bigg Boss gave a task as part of the nomination process.
- ^Note 4: On Day 20, Salman revealed that Abu and Siddharth D received the fewest votes. And the female housemates had the power to Vote to Eject one of them. Abu received the most votes and therefore, was ejected.
- ^Note 5: Sidharth S was nominated for two weeks due to violent behaviour
- ^Note 6: Shehnaaz was nominated by Bigg Boss for one week as she disobeyed Bigg Boss Orders
- ^Note 7: On Day 54, Bigg Boss asked all the contestants to tell one name from the nominated contestants i.e., Arti, Devoleena, Khesari, Sidharth S and Rashami who has given less contribution to the show, Majority took Khesari's name. Bigg Boss announced that This was a process to evict one contestant. Since Majority took Khesari's name, He was evicted.
- ^Note 8: On Day 62, Devoleena left the issue due to medical issues.
- ^Note 9: Shehnaaz was immuned from nominations as she was declared as the entertainer of the season.
- ^Note 10: On Day 67, Paras left the house for medical treatment due to injury on his finger and was removed from nomination list.
- ^Note 11: On Day 70, Salman revealed that Himanshi and Shefali J were in Bottom 2, Majority saved Shefali J and Himanshi was evicted.
- ^Note 12: On Day 70, Vikas Gupta entered the house as Devoleena's proxy
- ^Note 13: Sidharth S was punished for pushing Asim and was nominated for two weeks.
- ^Note 14: On Day 71, Bigg boss announced that Sidharth needs to go to the hospital immediately for treatment but he will be a part of the show.
- ^Note 15: On Day 71, Paras and Sidharth entered the Secret Room
- ^Note 16: On Day 72, After the nomination process was completed, Paras and Sidharth were given a privilege to save one nominated contestant, They saved Mahira
- ^Note 17: On Day 85, Since the eviction was cancelled, The nominations will be carryforwarded to the following week. Since Asim was the captain, He was immune from nominations.
- ^Note 18: On Day 87, Bigg Boss announced that Vikas Gupta's stay at house was completed as Devoleena's health condition is not good and she will not be returning to the show.
- ^Note 19: On Day 98, Salman announced that Madhurima and Shefali Bagga are in Bottom 2. Rest of the housemates had the power to eject one of them. Majority took Shefali Bagga's name and She was evicted.
- ^Note 20: On Day 99, Madhurima was punished for beating Vishal with a slipper and was nominated for two weeks by Bigg Boss
- ^Note 21: On Day 105, On the occasion of the season's huge success, Salman announced No eviction but the nominations will be carryforwarded to the following week.
- ^Note 22: On Day 112, Madhurima was ejected from the house due to physical violence
- ^Note 23: On Day 126, As Shehbaz and Vikas Gupta won the task, They had a power to save one housemate from nominations, They saved Arti.
- ^Note 24: On Day 129, As the nomination Task was cancelled, Asim, Sidharth and Rashami used their Elite Club Immunity and became the first three finalists
- ^Note 25: On Day 132, In Task, Sidharth saved Paras from nominations and became the fourth finalist
