= Mayur Verma =

Indian television actor (born 1991)

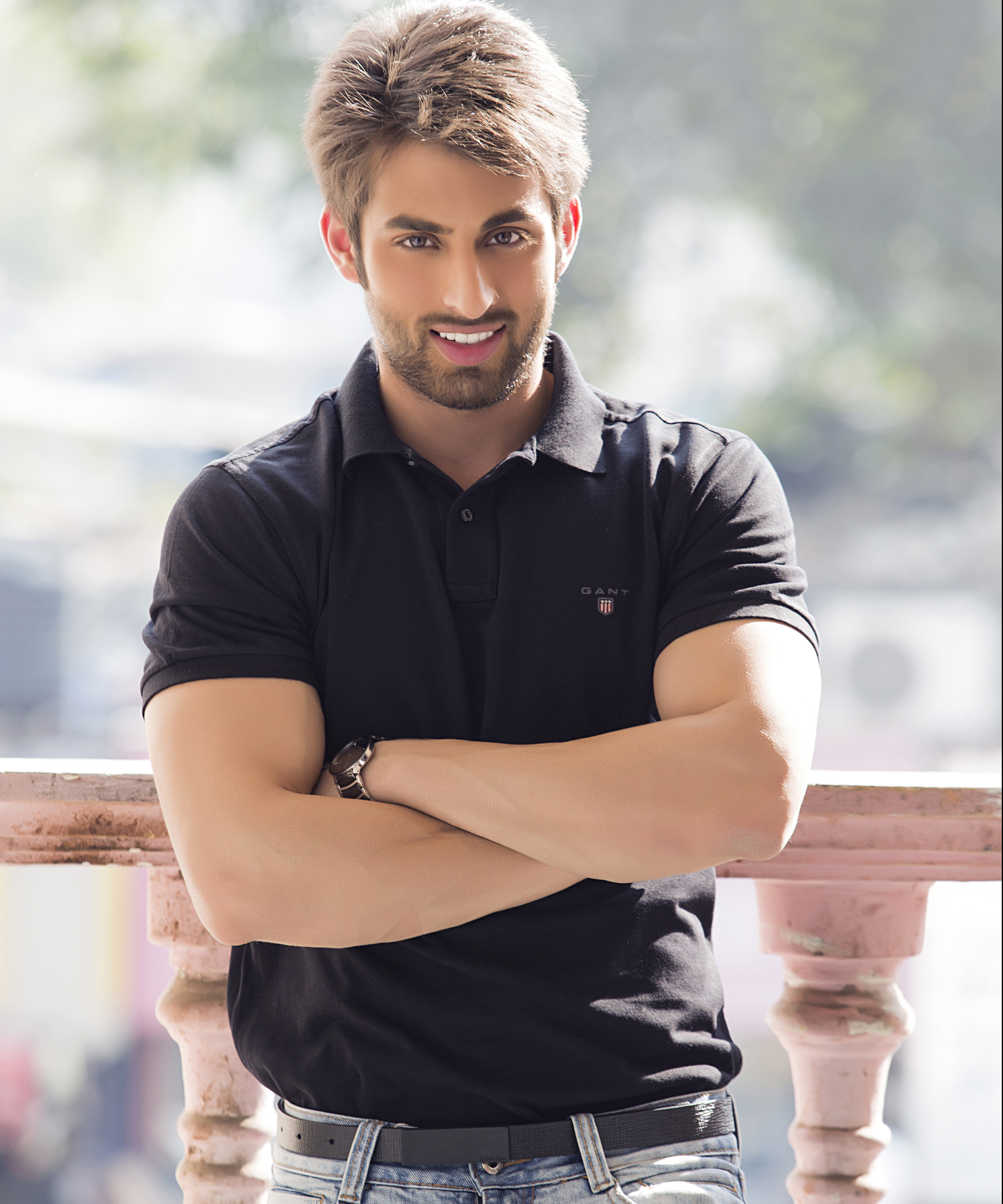
- Mayur Verma in 2018
- Born: 6 October 1991 (age 34); Ludhiana, Punjab, India
- Citizenship: Indian
- Occupation: Actor
- Years active: 2012–present

Mayur Verma (born 6 October 1991) is an Indian television actor known for playing Bunny in Jeannie Aur Juju. He worked serials such as Janbaaz Sindbad as a Pathan and Swaragini - Jodein Rishton Ke Sur as Kartik Malhotra. He participated in the reality show Mujhse Shaadi Karoge.

== Career ==
Mayur began his acting career with a role in the episodic Emotional Atyachar. He did a continuity role in Bade Achhe Lagte Hain and Kya Huaa Tera Vaada. However, his big break came in Jeannie Aur Juju on SAB TV. He plays Yo Yo Bunny Singh.

Mayur Verma has also done an episodic for the show Emotional Atyachar Season 4 on Bindass, where he played the role. He also appeared in Telugu TV commercials for Keline (home appliances) by Dream Merchants Ad Film Production House and has done print advertisements for various brands. In late 2014, he appeared in the highest TRP show CID. He was also selected for the reality show Bigg Boss Season 10, but he opted out because of other professional commitments.

== Filmography ==
=== Films ===
Year	Film	Role	Language	Notes
2019	Zindagi Tumse	Vansh	Hindi	Released

=== Television ===
Year	Title	Role
2020	Innocent The Bhola	Bhavesh
2020	Mujhse Shaadi Karoge	Mayur Verma
2019	The Anti Social Network	Mayur Verma
2016	Swaragini	Kartik Malhotra
2016	Janbaaz Sindbad	Pathan
2015	Jeannie Aur Juju	Bunny
2015	Aahat	
2014	CID	
2013	Bade Achhe Lagte Hain	
2013	Kya Huaa Tera Vaada	Shyam
2013	Emotional Atyachar	
