= Mujhse Shaadi Karoge =

Indian reality show

- Presented by: Gautam Gulati; Vikas Gupta; Manish Paul; Jay Bhanushali
- Starring: Paras Chhabra; Shehnaaz Kaur Gill
- Country of origin: India
- Original language: Hindi
- No. of seasons: 1
- No. of episodes: 25

Production
- Running time: 60–90 minutes
- Production company: Endemol India

Original release
- Network: Colors TV
- Release: 17 February – 20 March 2020

Mujhse Shaadi Karoge (transl. Will you marry me?) is an Indian reality television series that premiered on 17 February 2020 on Colors TV. Hosted by Gautam Gulati (formerly Manish Paul), starring Paras Chhabra and Shehnaaz Kaur Gill who try to find a suitable life partner for themselves from among the contestants.

== Off air ==
On 17 March 2020, Endemol Shine India announced that they are voluntarily suspending all their administrative and production departments until further notice due to the global COVID-19 pandemic, for minimizing the spread and to comply with the safety and precautionary measures suggested by the government. It is also in the wake of decision by Federation of Western India Cine Employees (FWICE) and Indian Film & Television Directors' Association (IFTDA) to hold shootings of film, TV shows and web series from 19 March to June 2020. Hence the show had to end before the original off air date. Reportedly the reason for Shehnaaz Kaur Gill's early exit and demand to leave the show was her love.

== Concept ==
In the auditions, Paras Chhabra and Shehnaaz Kaur Gill chose five contestants each who they want to get to know better. Both of them will be locked in a house with their five suitors. Over a period of 13 weeks, they will try to find their life partner which later on was cut short to 25 days.

== Contestants ==
=== Original contestants ===
Contestants for Shehnaaz
Name	Occupation	Known for	Hometown	Result
Rohanpreet Singh	Singer	Rising Star 2 Runner-up	Punjab	Approved
Vipin Kumar	Unknown	Viral Video, Roadies Revolution Contestant	Lucknow	Rejected
Balraj Syal	Actor/Comedian	Entertainment Ki Raat, Fear Factor: Khatron Ke Khiladi 10	Mumbai	Approved
Indeep Bakshi	Singer	Saturday-Saturday Song	Punjab	Approved
Mayur Verma	Actor	The Anti-Social Network	Ludhiana	Approved
Mayank Agnihotri	Businessperson		Kanpur	Approved

Contestants for Paras
Name	Occupation	Known for	Hometown	Result
Sanjjana	South Indian Actress	Bigg Boss Kannada 1 Contestant	Bangalore	Approved
Heena Panchal	Actress/Dancer	Bigg Boss Marathi 2 Contestant	Mumbai	Approved
Jasleen Matharu	Singer	Bigg Boss 12 Contestant	Mumbai	Approved
Hritu Zee	Singer	Splitsvilla 10 Contestant	Bhopal	Rejected
Ankita Shrivastava	Actress	Welcome Back	Mumbai	Approved
Navdeesh Kaur	YouTuber		Punjab	Approved

=== Wild card contestants ===
Shehnaaz

Shehzada Dhami & Tehraan Bakshi

Paras

Aanchal Khurana & Shivani Jha

== Housemates status ==
Contestant	Entry	Exit	Status
Paras Chhabra	Episode 1	Episode 25	Winner (1st Pair)
Aanchal Khurana	Episode 17	Episode 25	Winner (1st Pair)
Balraj Syal	Episode 1	Episode 25	Winner (2nd Pair)
Ankita Shrivastava	Episode 18	Episode 25	Winner (2nd Pair)
Ankita Shrivastava	Episode 15	Episode 18	Hospitalised
Ankita Shrivastava	Episode 1	Episode 11	Hospitalised
Shehnaaz Kaur Gill	Episode 1	Episode 25	Quit
Heena Panchal	Episode 1	Episode 25	Evicted
Mayur Verma	Episode 1	Episode 25	Evicted
Navdeesh Kaur	Episode 1	Episode 25	Evicted
Sanjjana	Episode 1	Episode 25	Evicted
Shivani	Episode 17	Episode 25	Evicted
Rohanpreet Singh	Episode 1	Episode 21	Evicted
Indeep Bakshi	Episode 1	Episode 21	Evicted
Shehzada Dhami	Episode 18	Episode 21	Evicted
Tehraan	Episode 21	Episode 25	Evicted
Tehraan	Episode18	Episode 21	Evicted
Mayank Jain	Episode 1	Episode 15	Evicted
Jasleen Matharu	Episode 1	Episode 15	Evicted

== Nominations table ==
First Level	Week 1				Week 2						Week 3								Week 4				Week 5 (FINALE WEEK)				
Advantage Card (for Shehnaaz)	Balraj										Mayur		Rohan	Mayur	Mayank				None		Shehzaada Tehraan	Indeep	None				
Advantage Card (for Paras)	Jasleen	Ankita			Jasleen						Navdeesh		Heena		Navdeesh				None		Aanchal Shivani	Ankita	None				
Date for Paras	Ankita				Jasleen						Navdeesh Jasleen	Navdeesh	Heena	Heena	None							Ankita	None				
Date for Shehnaaz	Balraj				Balraj						Mayur Indeep	Mayur	Rohan	Mayur	None							Indeep	None				
Task:	Shehnaaz & Paras's Decision	Speed Dating	Guess by touch	Result of the week	Commando	Live Performance	Gift Selection through points	Dare Challenge	Love Ki Jung	Result of the week	Position Decision by Votes (Result=Date)	Speed Dating	Cooking	Dinner Date	Pyaar ka Jaal (Vote to Jail)	Love ki Jung	Result of the week		Vote to Incapable	Holi Task	Vote to Evict	Date	Vote to Save	Result of the week	Best bride for Paras Vote by Shehbaaz	Final Vote for Connection	Grand Finale
Ankita	Advanced	Win	Win	Win	Rejected		Rejected	Hospitalised		Safe	Hospitalised				Navdeesh	N/A	Exempt		Navdeesh	Loose	Nominated		Balraj	Safe	Best Bride	Balraj Syal	Winner (1st Connection)
Balraj	Advanced	Win	Win	Win	Rejected		Advanced	Win	N/A	Advanced	Loose		N/A	Rejected	Balraj	Loose	BTM 2	Safe	Balraj	Win	Advanced				N/A	Ankita Shrivastav	Winner (1st Connection)
Paras	Hritu (To Reject)	Ankita (To Win)			Jasleen Sanjjana (To Win)	Sanjjana (To Save)	Jasleen (To Save)	Jasleen (To Date)	Jasleen Sanjjana (To Compete)	Heena (To Evict)	Navdeesh Jasleen (To Date)	Navdeesh (To Win and To Talk)	Heena (To Date)	Heena (To Advance)	Heena (To Jail)	Not Eligible					Ankita Sanjjana	Ankita (To Date)	Not Eligible		Best Bridegroom	Aanchal Khurana	Winner (1st Connection)
Aanchal	Not in house																				Exempt				3rd	Paras Chhabra	Winner (1st Connection)
Heena	Advanced	Loose	Win	Rejected	Rejected		Rejected	Rejected	N/A	BTM 2	Loose		Win	Advanced	Sanjjana	Loose	Advanced		Navdeesh	Loose	Nominated		Mayur	Safe	Runner-up	Mayur Verma	Evicted; Ep. 25
Sanjjana	Advanced	Loose	Win	Rejected	Win	Advanced		Rejected	Loose	Advanced	Loose		Loose	Rejected	Heena	Loose	BTM 2	Safe	Navdeesh	Loose	Advanced				4th	Paras Chhabra	Evicted; Ep. 25
Navdeesh	Advanced	Loose	Win	Rejected	Rejected		Rejected	Rejected	N/A	BTM 2	Win	Win	N/A	Rejected	Heena	Win	Safe		Heena	Win	Advanced				5th	Paras Chhabra	Evicted; Ep. 25
Shivani	Not in house																				Exempt				6th	Paras Chhabra	Evicted; Ep. 25
Mayur	Advanced	Loose	Loose	N/A	Rejected		Rejected	Rejected	N/A	Safe	Win	Win	Loose	Advanced	Balraj	Loose	Advanced		Balraj	Win	Advanced				N/A	Shivani Jha	Evicted; Ep. 25
Tehraan	Not in house																				Exempt		Evicted; Ep. 21		N/A	Shehnaaz Kaur Gill	Evicted; Ep. 25
Shehnaaz	Vipin, Akash (To Reject)	Balraj (To Win)			Indeep Rohan (To Win)	Rohan (To Save)	Balraj (To Save)	Balraj (To Date)	Indeep Mayank (To Compete)	Mayank (To Evict)	Mayur Indeep (To Date	Mayur (To Win and To Talk)	Rohan (To Date)	Mayur (To Advance)	Indeep (To Jail) Balraj (To Bail)	Not Eligible					Rohan Indeep	Indeep (To Date)	Not Eligible		None	Quit (Ep 25)	
Indeep	Advanced	Loose	Loose	N/A	Win	Rejected	Rejected	Rejected	Win	BTM 2	Win	Loose	N/A	Rejected	Balraj	Loose	Safe		Balraj	Win	Nominated		Evicted; Ep. 21				
Rohan	Advanced	Loose	Win	Rejected	Win	Advanced		N/A	N/A	Advanced	Loose		Win	Rejected	Balraj	Loose	Safe		Balraj	Win	Nominated		Evicted; Ep. 21				
Shehzada																					Exempt		Evicted; Ep. 21				
Mayank	Advanced	Loose	Loose	N/A	Rejected		Rejected	Challenge not Accepted	Loose	BTM 2	Loose		Loose	Rejected	Balraj	Win	BTM 2	Evicted; Ep. 15									
Jasleen	Advanced	Loose	Win	Rejected	Win	Rejected	Advanced	Win	Win	Advanced	Win	Loose	Loose	Rejected	Ankita	Loose	BTM 2	Evicted; Ep. 15									
Akash	Rejected																										
Hritu	Rejected																										
Vipin	Rejected																										
Notes																											
Against Public Votes	none				Ankita; Heena; Indeep; Mayank; Mayur; Navdeesh						Balraj; Jasleen; Indeep; Mayank; Navdeesh; Rohan; Sanjjana								Indeep; Rohan; Ankita; Heena						Heena; Mayur; Navdeesh; Shivani; Sanjjana; Tehraan		
Eliminated/Evicted	Vipin Hritu Akash				No Elimination						Mayank Jasleen								Indeep; Rohan; Shehzaada; Tehraan						Shehnaaz	Heena; Mayur; Navdeesh; Shivani; Sanjjana; Tehraan	Ankita and Balraj; Paras and Aanchal

Indicates contestants who have came for Shehnaaz
Indicates contestants who have came for Paras
Indicates that the Contestant was directly nominated for elimination.
Indicates that the Contestant was immune prior to nominations.
Indicates the contestant has been eliminated.
Indicates the contestant walked out to emergency.
Indicates the contestant has been ejected by housemates.

== Guest appearance ==
- Manish Paul
- Sidharth Shukla
- Rashami Desai
- Gautam Gulati
- Shehbaaz Badesha
- Jay Bhanushali
- Mahhi Vij
- Vikas Gupta
