= Sidharth Shukla =

Indian actor and model (1980–2021)

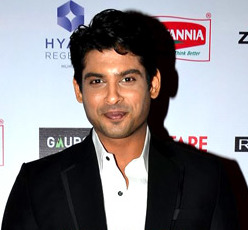
- Shukla in 2015
- Born: 12 December 1980; Bombay, Maharashtra, India
- Died: 2 September 2021 (aged 40); Mumbai, Maharashtra, India
- Education: Rachana Sansad School of Interior Design, Mumbai
- Occupations: Actor; host; model
- Years active: 2004–2021
- Known for: Balika Vadhu; Broken But Beautiful 3; Humpty Sharma Ki Dulhania; Bigg Boss 13; Dil Se Dil Tak; Fear Factor: Khatron Ke Khiladi 7

Sidharth Shukla (12 December 1980 – 2 September 2021) was an Indian actor, host and model who mostly appeared in Hindi television and films. He was known for his roles in Balika Vadhu, Broken But Beautiful 3, and Dil Se Dil Tak. He was the winner of Bigg Boss 13 and Fear Factor: Khatron Ke Khiladi 7. He hosted Savdhaan India, and India's Got Talent. He won the World's Best Model title in December 2005, beating 40 other participants from across Asia, Latin America, and Europe. He made his acting debut with a lead role in the 2008 show Babul Ka Aangann Chootey Na. In 2014, Shukla made his Bollywood debut in a supporting role in Humpty Sharma Ki Dulhania.

== Life and career ==
=== 1980–2007: Early life and career beginnings ===
Sidharth Shukla was born on 12 December 1980 into a Hindu Brahmin family in Bombay (present-day Mumbai) to Ashok Shukla, a civil engineer employed at the Reserve Bank of India and Rita Shukla, a homemaker. His family was originally from the city of Allahabad, Uttar Pradesh. He lost his father because of a lung disease during his modelling days. He has two elder sisters. Shukla attended St. Xavier's High School, Fort, Mumbai and holds a bachelor's degree in Interior Design from Rachana Sansad School of Interior Design. Shukla has described himself as a very athletic child, and represented his school in tennis and football. He played against Italian football club, AC Milan’s under-19 team, on their Mumbai visit as part of Festa Italiana. After completing bachelor's degree in interior design, Shukla worked in an interior designing firm for a couple of years. In 2004, Shukla was runner-up in the Gladrags Manhunt and Megamodel Contest. He appeared in a video "Resham Ka Rumal" sung by Ila Arun. In 2005, he represented India at the World's Best Model contest held in Turkey, and became the first Indian, as well as the first Asian, to win the title beating 40 contestants from across Asia, Latin America, and Europe. After winning the title, he appeared in advertisements for Bajaj Avenger, ICICI and Digjam.

=== 2008–2011: Television debut ===
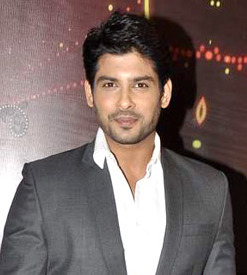
Shukla at ITA Awards in 2013

In 2008, he made his acting debut with a lead role in the television show Babul Ka Aangann Chootey Na on Sony TV opposite Aastha Chaudhary. Shukla played Shubh Ranawat, a man dedicated to his work and family. The show ended in February 2009. In 2009, he appeared as Veer Vardhan Singh in Jaane Pehchaane Se... Ye Ajnabbi on Star One opposite Sanjeeda Sheikh and Aditi Tailang. The show ended in September 2010. After Jaane Pehchaane Se... Ye Ajnabbi ended, he also appeared in a few episodes of Aahat. In 2011, he appeared as Rahul Kashyap in Love U Zindagi opposite Pavitra Punia on StarPlus. The show was inspired by the Bollywood movie Jab We Met. He also appeared in an episode of CID.

=== 2012–2014: Breakthrough with Balika Vadhu and Bollywood debut ===
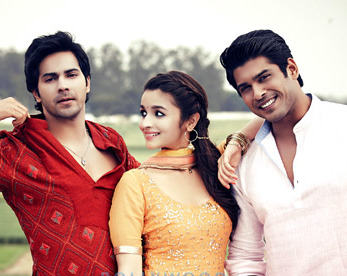
Shukla with Varun Dhawan (left) and Alia Bhatt (centre) during Humpty Sharma Ki Dulhania promotions

In 2012, Shukla appeared as District Collector Shivraj Shekhar, opposite Pratyusha Banerjee and Toral Rasputra in Balika Vadhu. It was his portrayal of Shiv in the long-running Colors TV social drama series Balika Vadhu which earned him widespread recognition and popularity, including several awards and nominations. He received the "GR8! Performer of the Year (Male)" award at the Indian Television Academy (ITA) Awards. He left the show in 2015, when his character, Shiv, died fighting with terrorists. In 2013, Shukla participated in the celebrity dance reality show Jhalak Dikhhla Jaa 6, and was eliminated in the 11th week. It was reported that Shukla had signed a 3-film-deal with Dharma Productions. In 2014, Shukla made his Bollywood debut in the romantic comedy Humpty Sharma Ki Dulhania in a supporting role playing the character of Angad Bedi, an NRI doctor and fiancé of the female protagonist played by Alia Bhatt. The film earned him an award for "Breakthrough Supporting Performance (Male)" in the 2015 Stardust Awards.

=== 2014–2018: Television hosting, Khatron Ke Khiladi and Dil Se Dil Tak ===
In 2014, Shukla was named the host of Savdhaan India. He introduced stories of common people who fought against crime. In 2015, after exiting from Balika Vadhu, he hosted India's Got Talent 6, with Bharti Singh, and the season finale was aired in June 2015. In 2016, Shukla won the stunt reality show Fear Factor: Khatron Ke Khiladi 7. The same year, he hosted India's Got Talent 7 with Bharti Singh, and the season finale was aired in July 2016. Later in 2016, Shukla appeared as Mr. Chakraborty, an Indian businessman, in a Kazakhstan movie, Business in Kazakhstan. In 2017, he appeared as Parth Bhanushali in Dil Se Dil Tak with co-stars Rashami Desai and Jasmin Bhasin. The series was inspired by the Bollywood movie, Chori Chori Chupke Chupke. He left the series in December 2017.

=== 2019–2021: Bigg Boss 13 and Broken But Beautiful 3 ===
In 2019, he participated in the reality show Bigg Boss 13, and was declared the winner in February 2020. Ormax media rated Shukla to be the most popular contestant of Bigg Boss 13, ranking him as number one throughout 20 weeks. He was voted the most favourite contestant of Bigg Boss 13 in polls conducted by Hindustan Times, India TV News, and The Times of India. He was the most tweeted contestant of Bigg Boss 13.

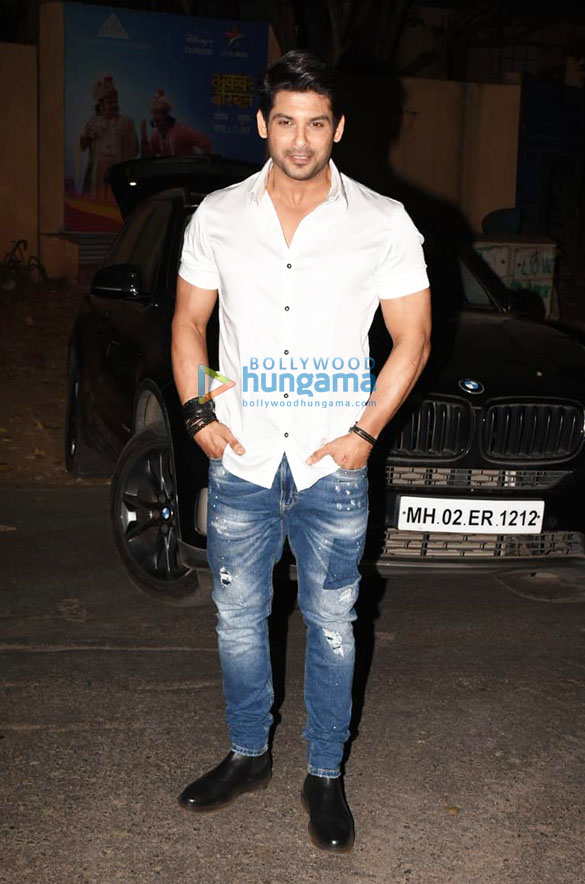
Shukla at Film City in 2021

In 2020, after winning Bigg Boss 13, Shukla appeared in two music videos, "Bhula Dunga", and "Dil Ko Karaar Aaya". The same year, Shukla entered as one of the "Toofani" Seniors in Bigg Boss 14, for the first two weeks. Shukla then appeared in another music video "Shona Shona". In January 2021, Shukla hosted 16th week's "Weekend Ka Vaar" of Bigg Boss 14, as Shukla was filling in for Salman Khan, who was missing from the show due to other work commitments.

Shukla made his OTT debut as Agastya Rao with the third season of the romance web series Broken But Beautiful opposite Sonia Rathee streaming on ALTBalaji and MX Player. The series and Shukla's performance received positive response from critics, Mugdha Kapoor of DNA India wrote, "It’s the fire and genuineness in Sidharth’s acting and freshness in Sonia’s performance that keeps the viewers glued and wanting to see more."

== In the media ==
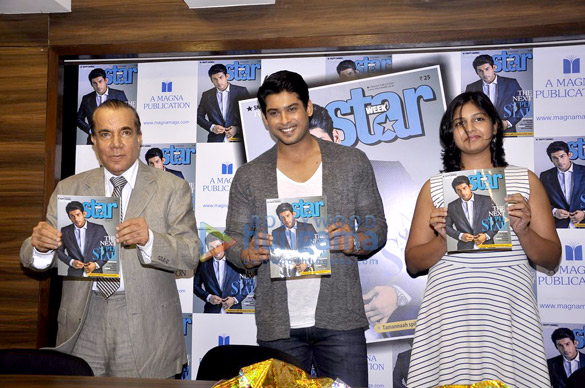
Shukla unveiling Magna magazine’s latest issue

In 2014, he won the Gold Awards Most Fit Actor award and was included in Rediff's Television's Top 10 Actors. In 2013, Shukla entered the Times of India's Most Desirable Men of 2013 at 34th position, ranking 33rd in 2014, 44th in 2017, 41st in 2018, 15th in 2019, and 11th in 2020. He was ranked 5th and 7th in the Times of India's Top 20 Most Desirable Men on Television in 2017 and 2018 respectively, and then he was ranked 1st consecutively in The Times 20 Most Desirable Men on Television in 2019 and 2020. He was announced Hindustan Times Most Stylish TV Personality 2017. Later in the year, he was also placed at the 10th position in the exclusive list of Top 12 Indian Male Hotties of 2017 by Trendrr.

In 2019, Shukla was the ninth most searched personality in India on Google. In 2021, he was declared The Times of India's Charismatic TV personality. Before the Bigg Boss 14 premiere, Sidharth was voted as the Bigg Boss Greatest Of All Times in a series of polls conducted by Colors TV, where 16 popular contestants across all the previous 13 seasons were nominated for the title.

== Death ==
Shukla died on 2 September 2021 after suffering a heart attack at the age of 40.

Initial speculations about the causes of his death looked at his smoking habits, but Shukla, who was a former chain smoker, had quit smoking by then, thus another reason being invoked was potential steroids abuse, especially as Shukla frequented the gym and aimed to keep a certain body image at his age; this theory would be further substantiated when Shukla’s personal trainer during his last six years, Sonu Chaurasia, would state that, some two months before his death, Shukla told him that "his stomach had begun bloating because of the steroids and had to do something about it."

== Filmography ==
=== Films ===
Year	Title	Role(s)	Notes	Ref.
2014	Humpty Sharma Ki Dulhania	Angad Bedi	Hindi film	
2016	Business In Kazakhstan	Mr. Chakraborty	Kazakh film	

=== Web series ===
Year	Title	Role(s)	Ref.
2021	Broken But Beautiful 3	Agastya Rao	

=== Television ===
Year	Title	Role(s)	Notes	Ref.
2008–2009	Babul Ka Aangann Chootey Na	Shubh Ranawat		
2009–2010	Jaane Pehchaane Se... Ye Ajnabbi	Veer Vardhan Singh		
2010	Aahat	Sidharth		
2011	Love U Zindagi	Rahul Kashyap		
2011	CID	Karan	Episode 747 - Paagal Aashiq	
2012–2015	Balika Vadhu	Shivraj Shekhar		
2013	Jhalak Dikhhla Jaa 6	Contestant	7th place	
2014–2015	Savdhaan India	Host		
2015	India's Got Talent 6	Host		
2016	Fear Factor: Khatron Ke Khiladi 7	Contestant	Winner	
2016	India's Got Talent 7	Host		
2017	Dil Se Dil Tak	Parth Bhanushali	Replaced by Rohan Gandotra	
2019–2020	Bigg Boss 13	Contestant	Winner	
2020	Bigg Boss 14	Senior	For first two weeks	
2021	Bigg Boss 14	Host	For 16th week	

==== Special appearances ====
Year	Title	Role	Ref.
2008	Ek Packet Umeed	Unnamed	
2009	Love Ne Mila Di Jodi	Veer Singh	
2009	Miley Jab Hum Tum	Veer Singh	
2010	Geet – Hui Sabse Parayi	Veer Singh	
2010	Pyaar Kii Ye Ek Kahaani	Veer Singh	
2010	Rang Badalti Odhani	Veer Singh	
2011	Yeh Rishta Kya Kehlata Hai	Rahul Kashyap	
2011	Saath Nibhaana Saathiya	Rahul Kashyap	
2012	Madhubala – Ek Ishq Ek Junoon	Shivraj Shekhar	
2012	Parichay — Nayee Zindagi Kay Sapno Ka	Shivraj Shekhar	
2013	Sasural Simar Ka	Shivraj Shekhar	
2013	Uttaran	Shivraj Shekhar	
2014	Rangrasiya	Shivraj Shekhar	
2014	Jhalak Dikhhla Jaa 7	Himself	
2014	Comedy Nights with Kapil	Himself	
2015	Comedy Classes	Himself	
2015	Bigg Boss 9	Himself	
2016	Bigg Boss 9	Himself	
2017	Bigg Boss 10	Himself	
2017	Shakti - Astitva Ke Ehsaas Ki	Parth Bhanushali	
2017	Ek Shringaar Swabhiman	Parth Bhanushali	
2018	Naagin 3	Himself	
2019	Kitchen Champion	Himself	
2019	Dance Deewane 2	Himself	
2020	Mujhse Shaadi Karoge	Himself	
2021	Namak Issk Ka	Himself	
2021	Bigg Boss OTT	Himself	
2021	Dance Deewane 3	Himself	

=== Music videos ===
Year	Title	Singer(s)	Notes	Ref.
2004	Resham Ka Rumal	Ila Arun		
2020	Bhula Dunga	Darshan Raval		
2020	Dil Ko Karaar Aaya	Yasser Desai, Neha Kakkar		
2020	Shona Shona	Tony Kakkar, Neha Kakkar		
2021	Habit	Shreya Ghoshal, Arko		

== Awards and nominations ==
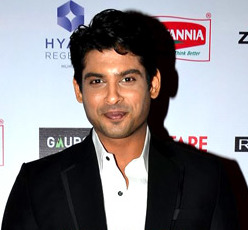
Shukla at the 60th Filmfare Awards in January 2015

Year	Award	Category	Show/Movie	Result	Ref.
2005	Gladrags Manhunt Contest	World's Best Model	N/A	Won	
2013	Star Guild Awards	Best Actor in a Drama Series	Balika Vadhu	Nominated	
2013	ITA Awards	GR8! Performer of the Year (Male)	Balika Vadhu	Won	
2013	Gold Awards	Best Actor (Popular)	Balika Vadhu	Won	
2014	Star Guild Awards	Best Actor in a Drama Series	Balika Vadhu	Nominated	
2014	Big Star Entertainment Awards	Most Entertaining Television Actor - Male	Balika Vadhu	Nominated	
2014	ITA Awards	GR8! On-Screen Couple of the Year (With Toral Rasputra)	Balika Vadhu	Nominated	
2014	Gold Awards	Most Fit Actor (Male)	N/A	Won	
2015	Stardust Awards	Breakthrough Supporting Performance (Male)	Humpty Sharma Ki Dulhania	Won	
2015	Filmfare Awards	Best Male Debut	Humpty Sharma Ki Dulhania	Nominated	
2015	Television Style Awards	Most Stylish Leap from TV to Films	Humpty Sharma Ki Dulhania	Won	
2017	ITA Awards	Best Actor - Male	Dil Se Dil Tak	Nominated	
2020	Gold Glam and Style Awards	Style Icon of Television Industry (Male)	—N/a	Won	

== See also ==
- List of Indian television actors
- List of Indian film actors
