= Life Mein Twist Hai =

- Film poster
- Directed by: Dinesh Soni
- Written by: Govind Mishra; Jeetendar Shrivastav; Kamesh Raj
- Produced by: Shyam Avtar Kedia, Umesh Kumar Sethiya, Jeetendar Shrivastav
- Starring: Sahil Akhtar; Michelle Shah; Archana Singh; Shailendra Pratap Singh
- Edited by: Prince Khan
- Music by: Aryan Jaiin, Veivek Asthaana
- Production companies: Jai Sai Ram Movies & Shree Shyam Entertainment Presents
- Release date: 12 December 2014
- Country: India
- Language: Hindi

Life Mein Twist Hai (transl. There is a twist in life) is a 2014 Hindi language Indian directed by Dinesh Soni. The film stars Sahil Akhtar, Michelle Shah and Arshi Suryavanshi. It was released on 12 December 2014

== Cast ==
- Sahil Akhtar.... Sagar
- Michelle Shah.... Anita
- Archana Singh.... Sheetal
- Shahir khan
- Govind Mishra.... Sagar
- Aditiya Shrivastav ( Chandan)
- Vaibhivi Joshi
- Heena Panchal...Item number "Balam Bambai″

== Soundtrack ==
No.	Title	Music	Singer(s)	Length
1.	"Minnat Karta Hu"	Aryan Jaiin	Javed Ali	6:31
2.	"Bandgi Tu Meri"	Aryan Jaiin	Javed Ali	3:10
3.	"Ishq Barsa Re"	Aryan Jaiin	Nishad Mishra, Sonu Kakkar	5:08
4.	"Nasamajh Tum"	Aryan Jaiin	Shaan	3:45
5.	"Balam Bambai"	Aryan Jaiin	Aryan Jaiin, Mamta Sharma	6:07
6.	"Life Mein Twist Hai"	Aryan Jaiin	Aryan Jaiin	4:32
