= Babuji Ek Ticket Bambai =

- Poster
- Directed by: Arvind Tripathi
- Written by: Nazir Qureshi
- Screenplay by: Nazir Qureshi Masood Mirza and Arvind Tripathi
- Produced by: K K Mundhada, Piyush Mundhada
- Starring: See below
- Cinematography: Surya Mishra
- Edited by: Santosh Mandal
- Music by: Nikhil Kamath, Altaf Sayyed, Umesh Tarkaswar
- Production company: Harikripa Films
- Distributed by: Adamant Pictures
- Release date: 6 October 2017
- Country: India
- Language: Hindi

Babuji Ek Ticket Bambai (transl. Father, a ticket to Mumbai!) is an Indian Hindi-language social drama film, written by Nazir Qureshi and directed by Arvind Tripathi. The film was scheduled to be released on 6 October 2017, but could never release.

It was released on 26 March 2021 with a new title 'Raag'.

== Plot ==
The film is based on the dehumanising situation that commercially sexually exploited women (CSEW) face in India. It follows a girl from Bedhiya community from the hinterlands of central India i.e. Bundelkhand region. Their culture is singing and dancing which is called "Rai". Their community is matriarchal, and the story is about three generations of a family where the youngest girl Madhu rebels to change the age-old tradition through education. But despite her progressive attitude she falls prey to the socio - police - politicon nexus she is married off to Rajjan, a boy from the same village who has intense crush for her from the beginning.

== Cast ==
- Rajpal Yadav
- Bharti Soni
- Sudha Chandran
- Yashpal Sharma
- Mohan Joshi
- Rakesh Bedi
- Milind Gunaji
- Roopa Ganguly
- Kiran Sharad
- Heena Panchal as item number Aankh Pe Chashma Daal Ke

== Soundtrack ==
The Music Was Composed By Nikhil Kamath, Altaaf Sayyed, Umesh Tarkaswar and Released by T-Series.

Track list
No.	Title	Lyrics	Music	Singer(s)	Length
1.	"Aankh Pe Chashma Daal Ke"	Kumaar	Nikhil Kamath	Mamta Sharma	3:10
2.	"Bepanhaa Tum Ko Chahe"	Altaf Sayyed	Altaaf Sayyed	Mohit Chauhan, Palak Muchhal	4:44
3.	"Tose Naina Ladey"	Traditional	Umesh Tarkaswar	Raghuvir Yadav, Rekha Rao	3:49
4.	"Dhokha Hai Dhokha Ishq Main"	Bhupinder Kaur, Haider Najmi	Umesh Tarkaswar	Shaan, Shabab Sabri	5:05
5.	"Bepanhaa Tum Ko Chahe - 1"	Altaaf Sayyed	Altaaf Sayyed	Mohit Chauhan, Palak Muchhal	4:44
6.	"Tose Naina Ladey (Remix)"	Traditional	Umesh Tarkaswar	Raghuvir Yadav, Rekha Rao	4:23
Total length:					25:55
