= Arhaan Khan =

Indian model

- Born: Mazhar Shaikh
- Occupations: model; Actor
- Years active: 2016–2019
- Known for: Badho Bahu; Bigg Boss 13

Mazhar Shaikh known professionally as Arhaan Khan is an Indian actor and model. He is known for his portrayal of Rana Singh Ahlawat in Badho Bahu on &TV. In 2019, he participated in Bigg Boss 13 on Colors TV.

== Career ==
He started his career as a model and actor where he did many campaigns and appeared in many fashion shows. In 2016 he started his acting career when he made his television debut on &TV Badho Bahu as Rana Ahlawaat, a wrestler character. In 2017, He made his film debut with V. Vijayendra Prasad feature film SriValli as Majnu. In late 2019, he joined the reality show Bigg Boss 13. He got evicted on 16 November 2019 after his very short two weeks stay in which he failed to get the public support. In late November, it was announced that he will be returning to the show as a wild-card entry again. However, on 31 December, he was evicted again.

== Filmography ==
=== Film ===
| Year | Title | Role | Notes |
|---|---|---|---|
| 2017 | SriValli | Majnu | Telugu film |

=== Television ===
| Year | Title | Role | Notes |
|---|---|---|---|
| 2016–2018 | Badho Bahu | Rana Ahlawat | Television debut |
| 2019 | Bigg Boss 13 | Contestant | 12th place |
