= Heena Panchal =

Indian actress and model

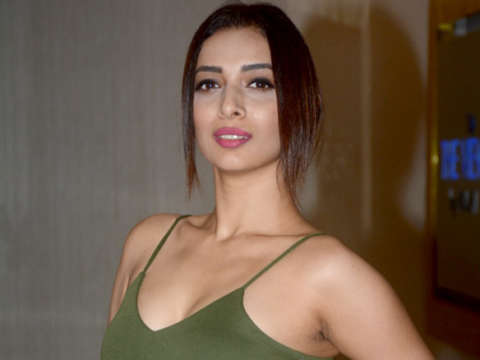
- Panchal in 2018
- Born: 9 March; Mumbai, Maharashtra, India
- Occupation: Actress
- Years active: 2014–present
- Known for: Bigg Boss Marathi 2; Mujhse Shaadi Karoge

Heena Panchal is an Indian actress known for her works in Hindi and Marathi language films. She is most famous for her item songs "Balam Bambai" and "Bevda Bevda Zalo Mi Tight". In 2019, she participated in Bigg Boss Marathi. Since February 2020, she has been a participant of the dating reality television series Mujhse Shaadi Karoge.

== Filmography ==
- 2014: Hum Hai Teen Khurafaati
- 2014: Life Mein Twist Hai
- 2015: Just Gammat
- 2015: Miss Tanakpur Haazir Ho
- 2015: Yagavarayinum Naa Kaakka (Tamil)
- 2015: Rathna Manjari
- 2015: Lodde (Kannada)
- 2016: Malupu (Telugu)
- 2017: Babuji Ek Ticket Bambai
- 2017: Shentimental
- 2017: Manus Ek Mati
- 2018: When Obama Loved Osama
- 2018: Vantas
- 2018: Jaane Kyun De Yaaron
- 2018: Tu Tithe Asave
- 2018: Kay Zala Kalana
- 2019: Perfume
- 2019: Dhumas
- 2021: Raag

== Television ==
Year	Name	Role	Notes	Ref.
2019	Bigg Boss Marathi 2	Contestant	Evicted (7th place)	
2020	Mujhse Shaadi Karoge	Contestant	Evicted (4th place)	

== Controversy ==
She was being investigated in a massive rave & drug racket. She got arrested in farmhouse at Igatpuri, Nashik including 22 persons with her.
