= India's Got Talent season 7 =

Indian talent competition series

India's Got Talent
- Season 7
- Promotional poster for season 7, featuring judges (L to R) judges Kher, Johar and Khan.
- Presented by: Bharti Singh; Sidharth Shukla
- Judges: Kirron Kher; Karan Johar; Malaika Arora Khan
- Winner: Suleiman
- No. of episodes: 21

Release
- Original network: Colors TV
- Original release: 30 April – 9 July 2016

Season chronology
- ← Previous; Season 6 Next → Season 8

The seventh season of India's Got Talent premiered on 30 April 2016. Bharti Singh and Sidharth Shukla returned to present the show. Malaika Arora Khan and Karan Johar returned for their fourth season, while Kirron Kher returned for her seventh season.

The seventh season was won by the flautist Suleiman being declared as the season's winner winning ₹50,00,000 (50 lakhs) along with a trophy and a Maruti Suzuki Celerio car from the title sponsor.

== Season overview ==
Logo used for the seventh season.

Following the conclusion of the previous season, Colors announced that the show would return for a seventh season with the same judging panel. Bharti Singh and Siddharth Shukla, who hosted the latter half of the previous season, would continue as hosts.

Once again, the logo was used somewhat similar to the America's Got Talent, instead of the regular Britain's Got Talent styled.

There were no major changes to the format of the show. The semi-finals were reduced to three rounds, with a separate one for the golden buzzer auditions. Three contestants from each semi-final would advance to the finals: one chosen by unanimous judges' choice among all the participants of that semi-final, and two by public vote. The results for each semi-final were announced the same way as in season six, with the judges' choice revealed the same day, and the public vote winners announced during the pre-final.

The golden buzzer returned for its third season. The judges were given two golden buzzers this season, unlike the previous one where they were given only one. However, Kirron Kher pressed her third golden buzzer for the Brijwasi Brothers during the final auditions. The following table shows the acts which received the golden buzzer in the audition:

Kirron Kher	Karan Johar	Malaika Arora Khan
The Manganiyar Seduction; Rajasthani Folk Singers	Aishwarya Pandit; Singer	Papai and Antara; Dance Duo
Nrityam Angels; Trio Dance Act	Suleiman; Flautist	Pallabi Halder; Aerial Dance Act
Brijwasi Brothers; Singing Group	—N/a	

Of the participants who auditioned for this season, twenty-eight secured a place in the semi-finals, with eleven, ten and seven participants performing in each. The following below lists the results of each participant's overall performance in this season:

Winner | Finalist | Semi-finalist | Golden Buzzer Audition

Participant	Age(s)	Genre	Act	Semi-final	Finished

=== Semi-finals Summary ===
Buzzed | Won the Public Vote | Won the Judges' Choice | Eliminated

==== Semi-final 1 (25 June) ====
Semi-Finalist	Order	Buzzes			Result
Semi-Finalist	Order	Kirron	Karan	Malaika	Result
Incredible Mallakhamb	1				Advanced (Won Judges' Choice)
Rangers Army	2				Eliminated
Biwash	3				Eliminated
Trishna The Band	4				Advanced (Won Public Vote)
Akash and Atharva	5				Advanced (Won Public Vote)
Sajiterious Group	6				Eliminated
Bappa Excel	7				Eliminated
Abhishek Majhithia	8				Eliminated
Shooter Dadis	9				Eliminated
Rishabh Verma	10				Eliminated

==== Semi-final 2 (26 June) ====
Semi-Finalist	Order	Buzzes			Result
Semi-Finalist	Order	Kirron	Karan	Malaika	Result
Rajiv Gidde	1				Eliminated
Rock On Crew	2				Advanced (Won Judges' Choice)
Raju and Sachin	3				Advanced (Won Public Vote)
Magnetiax Crew	4				Eliminated
Malket	5				Eliminated
Anuj Kumar	6				Eliminated
Nirmal Kumar	7				Eliminated
Nitish and Group	8				Advanced (Won Public Vote)
Happy Feet	9				Eliminated
Badri	10				Eliminated
Rajkumar Tiwari	11				Eliminated

==== Semi-final 3 (2 July) ====
The seven golden buzzer acts performed in this semi-final. The public voting was not opened for this semi-final, the judges initially had to choose three acts to advance, but instead they chose four.

Semi-Finalist	Order	Buzzes			Result
Semi-Finalist	Order	Kirron	Karan	Malaika	Result
Brijwasi Brothers	1				Advanced (Won Judges' Choice)
Pallabi Halder	2				Eliminated
Suleiman	3				Advanced (Won Judges' Choice)
Papai and Antara	4				Advanced (Won Judges' Choice)
The Manganiyar Seduction	5				Advanced (Won Judges' Choice)
Nrityam Angles	6				Eliminated
Aishwarya Pandit	7				Eliminated

=== Finals Summary ===
==== Pre Finale : India ka Faisla (3 July) ====
Advanced to Top 5 Finalists | Eliminated

- Special guest: Salman Khan & Anushka Sharma

Pre-Finalist	Order	Buzzes			Result
Pre-Finalist	Order	Kirron	Karan	Malaika	Result
Rock On	1				Eliminated
Akash & Atharva	2				Advanced to Top 5 (Won Public Vote)
Brijwasi Brothers	3				Eliminated
Incredible Mallkhamb	4				Eliminated
Nitish & Group	5				Advanced to Top 5 (Won Public Vote)
Suleiman	6				Advanced to Top 5 (Won Public Vote)
Raju & Sachin	7				Eliminated
Papai & Antra	8				Advanced to Top 5 (Won Public Vote)
Trishna The Band	9				Advanced to Top 5 (Won Public Vote)
The Manganiyar Seduction	10				Eliminated

==== Grand Finale (9 July) ====
Winner | Top 5 Finalists

The top 5 finalists were announced from among the ten pre-finalists, and they performed for the judges' scores out of 10, which would be added to the total public votes received in the pre-finale.

- Special Guest: Anil Kapoor from 24 and Cast of Dishoom (Jacqueline Fernandez, Varun Dhawan & John Abraham)
- Guest performance: Rajiv Gidde

Grand-Finalist	Order	Judges' Scores				Result
Grand-Finalist	Order	Kirron	Karan	Malaika	Total	Result
Papai & Antra	1	8	8	9	25	Grand-finalist
Nitish & Group	2	7	7	7	21	Grand-finalist
Suleiman	3	10	10	10	30	1st
Akash & Atharva	4	7	7	7	21	Grand-finalist
Trishna The Band	5	8	8	8	24	Grand-finalist
