= Janbaaz Sindbad =

- Genre: Adventurous; Fantasy
- Created by: Amrit Sagar
- Written by: Raghuvir Shekhawat; Damini Joshi
- Starring: See below
- Country of origin: India
- Original language: Hindi
- No. of seasons: 1
- No. of episodes: 9

Production
- Producer: Ashvini Yardi, Meenakshi Sagar
- Production locations: Mumbai, Maharashtra, India
- Camera setup: Single-camera
- Production company: Sagar Films

Original release
- Network: Zee TV
- Release: 27 December 2015 – 28 February 2016

Janbaaz Sindbad is an Indian adventurous fantasy television series, which premiered on 27 December 2015, and is broadcast on Zee TV. The show is based on Sinbad the Sailor folktale and is produced by Sagar Pictures and Ashvini Yardi, Meenakshi Sagar. It was a weekly series airing on every Sunday nights. The show ended abruptly without completing the story due to the low TRP ratings, the last episode was telecasted on 28 February 2016.

== Cast ==
- Harsh Rajput as Sindbad
- Mallika Singh as Ameen
- Mamik Singh as Arslaan
- Isha Chawla as Kaya
- Gaurav Vasudev as Koshike
- Mayur Verma as Pathan
- Aryan Vaid as Zafar
- Anirudh Dave as Zuhair / Zahid
- Tarun Malhotra
- Chetan Hansraj as Rawat
- Chaitanya Choudhry as Shazooba
- Deepshikha Nagpal
- Shraddha Musale
- Mayur Verma as Pathan
- Aishwarya Sharma Bhatt as Ameen's Mother
