= Bhula Dunga =

2020 Hindi song

Single by Darshan Raval ft. Sidharth Shukla and Shehnaaz Kaur Gill
- Language: Hindi
- Released: 24 March 2020
- Recorded: 2020
- Studio: DZ studio
- Genre: Ballad
- Length: 3:25
- Label: Indie Music Label
- Composer: Darshan Raval
- Lyricists: Gurpreet Saini & Gautam Sharma
- Producer: Kaushal Joshi

Music video
- "Bhula Dunga" on YouTube

"Bhula Dunga" (transl. I will forget) is a 2020 Indian Hindi-language song, sung and composed by Darshan Raval, starring Sidharth Shukla and Shehnaaz Gill in the music video.

== Background and release ==
The first look of a song was out on 17 March 2020 titled "Bhula Dunga". The song was released on 24 March 2020 by Indie Music Label Channel on YouTube.

== Music video ==
The song portrays the love story of Sidharth Shukla and Shehnaz Gill. In its three-and-a-half-minute video, Shehnaz walks away, leaving Sidharth behind and hoping for her return. Throughout the video, we see Sidharth reminiscing about the moments they spent together. At the end of the video, Shehnaz finally returns to him—only for Sidharth to walk away instead.

== Reception ==
The song crossed more than 30 million views in less than 4 days of its release and 50 million views in few days. The song became an instant hit and became the most commented Indian song till that time. It defeated Justin Bieber's " Sorry" and entered into Top 40 Most commented songs of all time worldwide.

== Personnel ==
- Song: Bhula Dunga
- Singer & composer: Darshan Raval
- Starring: Sidharth Shukla & Shehnaaz Gill
- Lyrics: Gurpreet Saini & Gautam G. Sharma
- Producer: Kaushal Joshi
- Director: Punit Jayesh Pathak
- D.O.P: Dhruwal Patel
- DOP on second camera: Shivam Singh
- Focus puller: Manoj Yadav, Alok Yadav
- Assistant Directors: Akash Shetty, Rutuja Parekh, Hiten Shah
- Editor: Pankaj Sharma
- Colourist: Rahill Merchant
- Executive Producer: Amit Vij Production
- Controller: Vivek Johar
- Stylist: Ken Ferns
