= Jaane Pehchaane Se... Ye Ajnabbi =

- Created by: Cinevistaas Limited
- Written by: Sonali Jaffer, Gaurav Sharma, Anshuman Sinha, Vinod Ranganath, sharad tripathi
- Directed by: Iqbaal Rizzvi
- Starring: Sidharth Shukla; Sanjeeda Sheikh
- Opening theme: "Jaane Pehchaane Se Ye Ajnabbithe movie " by Shaan.
- Country of origin: India
- Original language: Hindi
- No. of episodes: 240

Production
- Running time: 20 minutes

Original release
- Network: STAR One
- Release: 19 October 2009 – 17 September 2010

Jaane Pehchaane Se... Ye Ajnabbi is an Indian television show that premiered on Star One on 19 October 2009 and ended on 17 September 2010.

== Plot ==
This story is about a girl named Ayesha. She lives happily with her elder sister Divya, brother-in-law Jay Vardhan Singh and nephew Nihaal. But her life takes a different turn when she loses her sister and brother-in-law in a car accident. Ayesha moves to Mumbai with Nihal. To make ends meet she starts working as a housekeeper at the luxurious Hotel Ramada where Veer Vardhan Singh is her boss. Veer is the younger brother of Jay, a fact of which both Ayesha and Veer are unaware. Veer is trying to locate Nihal, who is the future heir to the family business. Veer is smitten by Ayesha but doesn't realize she is Divya's sister. Later, he finds out Ayesha's real identity; they have a big fight over guardianship of Nihaal. Veer and his mother Kamini Vardhan Singh file a case against Ayesha and get Nihal's custody. Veer develops a soft corner and lets Ayesha stay with his family to take care of Nihal. Slowly, they start to fall for each other. Ayesha finds out that Jay and Divya's death wasn't an accident but a case of murder; she tries to locate their murderer. Meanwhile the unknown murderer hires a hit man who apparently kills Ayesha by pushing her from a cliff.

Three months later, Veer is constructing a Day Care Centre in memory of Ayesha. Radhika, a rich fashion designer, enters his life. Soon, Radhika is revealed to be Ayesha who has survived the murder attempt and got a new face by plastic surgery. She wants to take revenge from Veer, whom she believes to be her attacker. Later, when Veer risks his life for her, she realizes that he is innocent. She tells him that someone from the Vardhan family killed Jay and Divya; the same person now wants to hurt her and Nihal. Kamini is then revealed to be the culprit, who not only attacked Ayesha but also killed Jay (her son) and Divya. One day, Ayesha overhears Kamini talking to herself about all her crimes. Kamini and Ayesha attack each other, which only results in Nihal getting injured. Kamini blackmails Ayesha into hiding her crimes. When Nihal recovers, he remembers everything about Kamini. Then Kamini calls a famous specialist, Dr. Dhruv Khanna, who is a friend of Ayesha. Dhruv, Ayesha and Nihaal plot together and get Kamini arrested for murder of Divya and Jay. Finally, Veer and Ayesha get married and live happily.

== Cast ==
=== Main ===
- Sidharth Shukla as Veer Vardhan Singh
- Sanjeeda Sheikh as Ayesha / Radhika
- Aditi Tailang as Roli Sharma / Ayesha

=== Recurring ===
- Karishma Tanna as Avni
- Lavina Tandon as Parminder Kaur
- Simple Kaul as Natasha Sareen
- Diwakar Pundir as Jay Vardhan Singh
- Malini Kapoor as Divya Vardhan Singh
- Preeti Gandwani as Nandini
- Abir Goswami as Avinash
- Varsha Usgaonkar as Kamini Vardhan Singh
- Mihir Mishra as Dr.Dhruv Khanna
- Rahul Pendkalkar as Nihal Singh
- Abhimaan Balhara as Rajdeep Sahni
- Rocky Verma as Hotel's Guest
- Neelesh Malviya as DUBEY
