= Just Gammat =

2015 Indian film

- Directed by: Milind Arun Kavade
- Produced by: Seema Shrivastav
- Starring: Sanjay Narvekar; Jitendra Joshi; Smita Gondkar; Aditi Sarangdhar
- Cinematography: Samla Bhaskar
- Music by: Nitin Kumar Gupta
- Release date: 28 March 2015
- Country: India
- Language: Marathi

Just Gammat is an Indian Marathi language film directed by Milind Arun Kavade and produced by Seema Shrivastav. The film stars Sanjay Narvekar, Jitendra Joshi, Smita Gondkar and Aditi Sarangdhar. Music by Nitin Kumar Gupta. The film was released on 28 March 2015.

== Synopsis ==
Two friends cross paths after a long time and decide to get drunk together. In their drunken stupor, they plan to kill each other's wives but face hilarious challenges in their quest

== Cast ==
- Sanjay Narvekar as Mohan
- Jitendra Joshi as Ashok
- Smita Gondkar as Meera
- Aditi Sarangdhar
- Atul todankar
- Deepak Shirke
- Vijay Patkar
- Aarti Solanki
- Jaywant Wadkar
- Arun Kadam
- Sanjay Kulkarni
- Heena Panchal as special appearance
- Vipul Deshpande

== Soundtrack ==
Just Gammat

Soundtrack album by Nitin Kumar Gupta
- Released: 2015
- Recorded: 2015
- Genre: Feature film soundtrack
- Length: 25:01
- Language: Marathi

Official audio
- Just Gammat – Full Album on YouTube

Track listing
No.	Title	Singer(s)	Length
1.	"Bewda Bewda"	Nitin Kumar Gupta, Praveen Duth Stephen	4:00
2.	"Tujha Bina"	Swapnil Bandodkar	3:49
3.	"Gammat Gammat"	Avadhoot Gupte	3:21
4.	"Bewda Overload (N.R.G. Remix)"	Indrani Sharma, Nitin Kumar Gupta, Praveen Duth Stephen	3:59
Total length:			14:29

== Critical response ==
Just Gammat film received negative reviews from critics. A reviewer from The Times of India gave the film a rating of 2/5 and wrote "If you are looking for strong content and powerful performances, this is definitely not your cup of tea. Watch it if you have to". Ganesh Matkari of Pune Mirror wrote "The screenplay is senseless, dialogues unfunny and situations unbelievable. I know that any film needs some suspension of disbelief on part of the audience". A reviewer from Loksatta wrote "While writing the four main characters, no attempt has been made to give personality to the characters, which are necessary to impress the audience". A Reviewer of Zee Talkies wrote "Good art work, a tasteful background score and sound design by Santosh Phutane, Salil Amrute and Anil Nikam, respectively, are the plus points of this film. ‘Just Gammat’ therefore turned out to be an average entertainer".
