= Shehnaaz Gill =

Indian actress, model, and singer (born 1994)

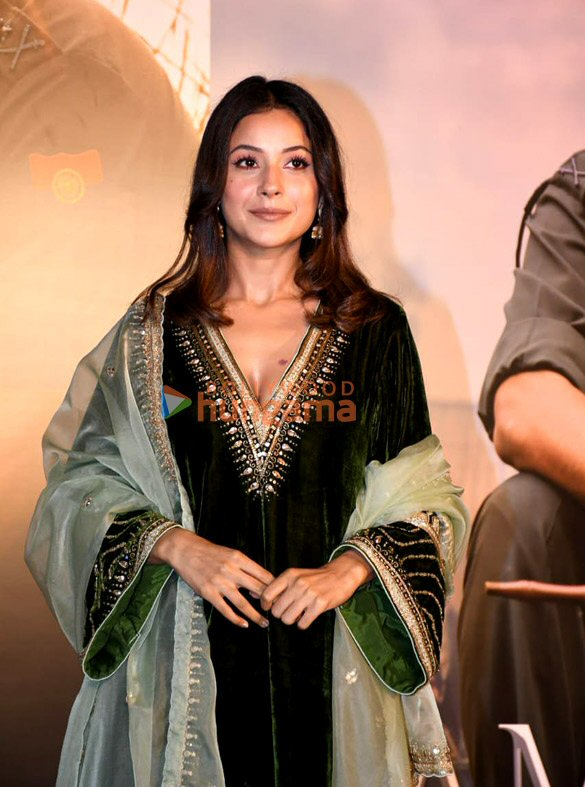
- Gill in 2023
- Born: Shehnaaz Kaur Gill; 27 January 1994 (age 32); Chandigarh, India
- Other name: Sana
- Education: Lovely Professional University (B.Com)
- Occupations: Producer; model; actor; singer
- Years active: 2015–present
- Known for: Ikk Kudi; Kisi Ka Bhai Kisi Ki Jaan
- Relatives: Shehbaz Badesha (Brother)

Shehnaaz Kaur Gill (born 27 January 1994) is an Indian actress, model, and singer who works in television and films. She began her modelling career with the 2015 music video, Shiv Di Kitaab. In 2017, she debuted as an actress in the Punjabi film Sat Shri Akaal England. In 2019, she participated in the reality show Bigg Boss 13 where she emerged as 2nd runner up.

== Life and career ==
=== Early life and career beginnings ===
Shehnaaz Kaur Gill was born on 27 January 1994 and raised in Punjab, India.

She began her career by featuring in "Shiv Di Kitaab" in 2015. Gill appeared in "Majhe Di Jatti" and "Pindaan Diyan Kudiyaan" in 2016. Gill's another music video came with Garry Sandhu titled Yeah Baby Refix. Gill also starred in some Punjabi films such as Sat Shri Akaal England in 2017, Kala Shah Kala and Daaka in 2019.

=== Bigg Boss 13 and further ventures ===
In September 2019, Gill entered as a celebrity participant on Bigg Boss 13. While she was in the Bigg Boss house, her first single, "Veham" came out, followed by some other singles including "Sidewalk", "Range" and "Ronda Ali Peti". The season ended in February 2020, where Gill finished up as second runner-up. During the show she got widely popular. In February 2020, she appeared in Mujhse Shaadi Karoge but it terminated within a month because of the COVID-19 pandemic.

Gill then appeared in a number of music videos including "Bhula Dunga", "Keh Gayi Sorry", "Kurta Pajama", "Waada Hai", "Shona Shona" and "Fly".

In 2021, Gill appeared in the Punjabi film Honsla Rakh opposite Diljit Dosanjh.

In 2023, Gill appeared in the Hindi films Kisi Ka Bhai Kisi Ki Jaan produced by Salman Khan and Thank You For Coming produced by Rhea Kapoor and Ekta Kapoor. She also appeared in the music video for the song "Sajna Ve Sajna", a remix of the original from the film Chameli, which was recreated for the film Vicky Vidya Ka Woh Wala Video. Gill returned to star in Punjabi films the next year, as she starred in the film Ikk Kudi, and the following year in Ishqnama. She is now set to star alongside Gippy Grewal in Singh vs Kaur 2 in September 2026 and will reunite with Diljit Dosanjh for the film Ranna Ch Dhanna, which is scheduled to release in June 2027.

== Media image ==
Gill was ranked 13th and 11th in the Times Top 20 Most Desirable Women on TV in 2019 and 2020 respectively. She was ranked at No. 45 in the Times Most Desirable Women in 2020. In 2021, Gill appeared on the digital cover of Filmfare and was awarded as the "Promising Fresh Face" at the ET Inspiring Women Awards.

== Filmography ==
=== Films ===
Year	Title	Role	Language	Notes	Ref.
2017	Sat Shri Akaal England	Sonia Khanna	Punjabi		
2019	Kala Shah Kala	Taaro	Punjabi		
2019	Daaka	Pushpa	Punjabi		
2021	Honsla Rakh	Sweety	Punjabi		
2023	Kisi Ka Bhai Kisi Ki Jaan	Sukoon	Hindi		
2023	Thank You for Coming	Rushi Kalra	Hindi		
2024	Vicky Vidya Ka Woh Wala Video	Chameli	Hindi	Special appearance in song "Sajna Ve Sajna"	
2025	Ikk Kudi	Simmi/Tejo	Punjabi		
2026	Ishqnama	Nasima	Punjabi		
2026	Singh vs Kaur 2 †	Jasneet Kaur	Punjabi	Completed	
2027	Ranna Ch Dhanna †	TBA	Punjabi		
TBA	Sab First Class †	TBA	Hindi	Completed	

=== Television ===
Year	Title	Role	Notes	Ref.
2019–2020	Bigg Boss 13	Contestant	2nd runner-up	
2020	Mujhse Shaadi Karoge	Herself	participant	
2020	Shaandaar Ravivaar	Herself	Guest appearance	

=== Music video appearances ===
Year	Title	Singer(s)	Ref.
2015	"Shiv Di Kitaab"	Gurvinder Brar	
2015	"Selfie"	Honey Sarkar	
2015	"BDS Kardi"	Vattan Sandhu	
2015	"Maar Kar Gayi"	Jaslove	
2016	"Majhe Di Jatti"	Kanwar Chahal	
2016	"Pindaan Diyaan Kudiyaan"	Gejja Bhullar	
2016	"Kafila"	Sahib Kaler	
2016	"Je Haan Ni Karni"	Saaheb Inder	
2016	"Har Gal"	Sikander Malhi	
2016	"Yaaran Di Vote"	Deep Sidhu	
2016	"Velliyan Da Laana"	Gurjazz	
2016	"Laal Maruti"	Harjot	
2016	"Putt Sardaran De"	Aman Dhillon	
2016	"Rishte Te Rishta"	Manpreet Waris	
2016	"Flight"	Davvy Dhanoa	
2016	"3 Goliyan"	Nick Sandhu	
2016	"Chandigarh Police"	Pretty Bhullar	
2016	"7 Din"	Amardeep	
2016	"Goli"	Vattan Sandhu	
2016	"Shartaan"	Deep Bhangu	
2016	"Murga"	Aman Sandhu	
2017	"Yaari"	Guri	
2017	"Pyar"	Karan Sehmbi	
2017	"Lakh Laanhta"	Ravneet Singh	
2017	"Shokeen"	Rajvir Jawanda	
2017	"Chann"	Akhilesh Nagar	
2017	"Satrangi Titli"	Jass Bajwa	
2017	"Viah Da Chaa"	Sukhman Heer	
2017	"Mangni 2 (Malwe Da Jatt)"	Joban Sandhu	
2017	Pyar Dholna	Lovie Virk	
2017	"Vehla"	John Barara	
2017	"Jatt Jaan Vaarda"	Armaan Bedil	
2017	"Mere Sanam"	Dr. Pardeep Bhardwaj	
2017	"Aakhian"	Parminder Singh and Joban Wahla	
2017	"Makeup"	Akshay	
2017	"Ishq"	Isher Bachhal	
2017	"Aa Sajna"	Vaneet Khan	
2017	"Shehzaadi The Queen"	Lakha Sidhu	
2017	"Gamle"	Harry Singh	
2017	"Gusse Ho Ke Nahiyo Sarna"	Jazz Sandhu	
2017	"Main Nahi Mandi"	Bai Amarjit	
2017	"Laggi Yaari"	Vin Brar	
2017	"Eh Gall Pichle Sunday Di"	Sukhshinder Shinda	
2017	"Cat Eyes"	Honey Sidhu	
2017	"Jatti Vs Janjh"	Gurmeet Singh	
2017	"Hawai Adda"	Tej Bhangu	
2017	"PU Boliyan"	Challa	
2017	"Sharabi Pind"	Binnie Toor	
2018	"Yeah Baby Refix"	Garry Sandhu	
2018	"Matching"	Gupz Sehra	
2018	"Jatti Hadd Sekhdi"	Surjit Aulakh	
2018	"Saada Challa"	Raja Game Changerz	
2018	"Facebook Wali"	Avtar Deepak and Gurlez Akhtar	
2018	"Gunday Ik Vaar Fer"	Dilpreet Dhillon and Baani Sandhu	
2018	"Different Gabru"	Preet Jassal	
2018	"Laadli"	Narayan	
2018	"Peg Marda"	Turban Beats	
2018	"Meditation"	Manaa Mandd	
2018	"Pain"	Parm Malhi	
2018	"Photo Kapiyan"	Parteek Maan	
2018	"Kaim"	Preet Ryaz	
2018	"Pranda"	Hearbeat	
2018	"Revolver"	Tejbir	
2018	"Gaut"	Sifat	
2018	"White Gold"	Elly Mangat	
2018	"Saath Jatt Da"	Himmat Sandhu	
2018	"Peg Paun Wele"	Simar Gill	
2018	"Change"	Gurneet Dosanjh	
2018	"Pagg Di Pooni"	Hardeep Grewal	
2018	"Laggi Hove Ghutt"	Upkar Sandhu	
2018	"Shoppang"	Inder Dosanjh	
2018	"Silent Game"	Teji Grewal	
2018	"Ankhi Bande"	Katani Mangat and Pretty Bhullar	
2018	"Jahaaj"	Garry Bagri	
2018	"Newspaper"	Jagmeet Bhullar	
2018	"Poh Da Mahina"	Jindu Bhullar	
2018	"Jatt Dhoorh Patt"	Meenu Singh	
2018	"Khali Botlaan"	Deep Sidhu	
2018	"Gulaam Bhabhi Da"	Deep Sidhu	
2018	"Saadh Jatt"	Satkar Sandhu	
2018	"Yaariyan"	Jonty	
2018	"Pachtayenga Dhola"	Penny	
2018	"Sketch"	Khush Baaz Ft. Inder Pandori	
2018	"Dream"	Kabal	
2018	"Ki Chahida"	Jairit Beniwal	
2018	"Giftaan"	Deep Karan	
2018	"Chadra"	Guru Bhullar	
2018	"Yess Mam"	Suffi Rathour	
2018	"Kalli Ho Gayi (Alone)"	Harvy Sandhu	
2018	"Sangdi"	Inder Chahal	
2018	"Chitta"	Nav Dolorain	
2018	"President"	Rhythm Gulati	
2019	"Koi Gall Ni (Album-Jazbaati)"	Nachattar Gill	
2019	"California"	Nishawn Bhullar	
2019	"Khauff"	Jigar	
2019	"Old School Jatti"	Navjeet	
2019	"Mind Na Kari"	Robbey Singh	
2019	"Jawayi"	Gurlez Akhtar	
2019	"Sohneya"	Guri	
2019	"Chann Ve"	Garry Dhanju	
2019	"Jatt Nature"	Gursanj	
2019	"Mainu Tere Jehi"	V Raj	
2019	"Langotiye Yaar"	Dilraj Dhillon	
2019	"Dollar Da Jugaad"	Jass Pelia ft Gurlez Akhtar	
2019	"Saheli"	Kamal Khaira	
2019	"Head Tail"	Gur Chahal	
2019	"Chad Khehrra"	Jatinder Dhiman	
2019	"Gedi Route"	Nawab	
2019	"Gucci Gacci"	Dilraj Bhullar	
2019	"Welcome To Jattwaad"	King Sidhu	
2019	"Too Much Late"	Sunny Shawn	
2019	"TikTok"	Ladi Singh	
2019	"Last Call"	Amar Singh	
2019	"Kasam Khuda Di"	R Guru, Tanishq Kaur and Kulbir Jhinjer	
2019	"Fiqran"	Ricky Sandhu	
2019	"Vair"	Raja Game Changerz	
2019	"Jaddi Sardar"	Param D	
2019	"Jatt Circle"	Dhammi Gill and Gurlez Akhtar	
2019	"Shera Samb Lai"	Arjan Dhillon	
2019	"Galtian"	Prabh Jass	
2019	"Brainwash"	Angrej Ali and Gurlez Akhtar	
2019	"Viah"	G Sandhu	
2019	"Mittran De Dil"	Pav Gandhi	
2020	"Mangni"	AJ Dharmani	
2020	"Chann Mahiya"	Khush Chahal	
2020	"Audian"	Jeet Sandhu	
2020	"Manglik"	Manvir Jhinjar	
2020	"Teriyan Akhan"	Rahul Grover	
2020	"Love Affair"	Ranjeet Sran and Gurlez Akthar	
2020	"Gulab"	Maan Pandrali	
2020	"Gentleman"	Robbey Singh	
2020	"Bhula Dunga"	Darshan Raval	
2020	"Keh Gayi Sorry"	Jassi Gill	
2020	"Kurta Pajama"	Tony Kakkar	
2020	"Waada Hai"	Arjun Kanungo	
2020	"Shona Shona"	Tony Kakkar and Neha Kakkar	
2021	"Fly"	Badshah and Amit Uchana	
2021	"Habit"	Shreya Ghoshal and Arko	
2023	"Moon Rise"	Guru Randhawa	
2023	"Yaar Ka Sataya Hua Hai"	B Praak	
2025	"Sheeshe Wali Chunni"	Yo Yo Honey Singh, Girik Aman	
2025	"When and Where"	Yo Yo Honey Singh	

== Discography ==
Year	Title	Composer	Ref.
2019	"Aunty Aunty"	Herself	
2019	"Ronda Ali Peti"	Herself	
2019	"Veham"	Laddi Gill	
2019	"Booha Khol De"	Lovees	
2019	"Range"	Lovees	
2020	"Sidewalk"	Harj Nagra	
2020	"Straight Up Jatii"	Harj Nagra	
2021	"Tu Yaheen Hai"	Raj Ranjodh	
2022	"Ghani Syaani"	MC Square	
2023	"Mirza"	Tanishk Bagchi	
2024	"Dhup Lagdi"	Aniket Shukla, Udaar	
2026	"Banje Daaru"	Kaptaan	

== Awards and nominations ==
Year	Award	Category	Result	Ref.
2023	Pinkvilla Screen and Style Icons Awards	Super Stylish Charming Diva	Won	
2023	Bollywood Hungama Style Icons	Most Stylish Digital Entertainer (Female)	Nominated	
2023	Bollywood Hungama Style Icons	Most Stylish Trailblazer	Won	
2024	Pinkvilla Screen and Style Icons Awards	Stylish Haute Stepper	Won	
