= Badho Bahu =

2016 Indian television series

- Genre: Drama; Romance
- Created by: Dipti Kalwani
- Written by: Pankaj Mavchi; Dipti Kalwani
- Directed by: Sumit Sodani
- Starring: Rytasha Rathore; Prince Narula
- Country of origin: India
- Original language: Hindi
- No. of episodes: 444

Production
- Producers: Dipti Kalwani; Teenna Swayyam; Sushant Kumar
- Camera setup: Multi-camera
- Production companies: Sunny Side Up films Private Limited Liability Partnership; Hum Tum Tele-Films Private Limited Liability Partnership

Original release
- Network: &TV
- Release: 12 September 2016 – 25 May 2018

Badho Bahu is an Indian Hindi-language romantic drama television series that aired on &TV. Produced by Sunny Side Up and Hum Tum Tele Films, the show premiered on September 12, 2016. It starred Rytasha Rathore and Prince Narula in the lead roles of Komal and Lakhan respectively. The show went off air on 17 May 2018. It has been remade in Kannada as Brahmagantu on Zee Kannada, in Tamil as Oru Oorla Oru Rajakumari on Zee Tamil, in Malayalam as Swathi Nakshatram Chothi on Zee Keralam, in Telugu as Gundamma Katha on Zee Telugu.

== Plot ==
It revolves around an overweight girl, Komal, who gets nicknamed Badho because of her physical appearance. Komal is made to do tough manual tasks which need physical strength. She is a sweet, loving, energetic and a simple girl. She has a big heart and helps most people in her town. Lucky Singh Ahlawat is a famous wrestler and is known for his looks. A series of events leads up to Komal and Lucky getting married.

== Cast ==
=== Main ===
- Rytasha Rathore as Komal "Badho" Singh Ahlawat: Jamuna and Shamsher's daughter; Prithvi and Vardaan's sister; Lucky's wife (2016–2018)
- Prince Narula as Laakha "Lucky" Singh Ahlawat: Raghubir and Malti's son; Rana and Pragya's cousin; Badho's husband (2016–2018)

=== Recurring ===
- Pankaj Dheer as Raghubir Singh Ahlawat: Kailash and Chhoto's brother; Malti's husband; Lucky's father (2016–2018)
- Jaya Ojha as Malti Ahlawat: Raghubir's wife; Lucky's mother (2016–2018)
- Arhaan Khan as Ranbir "Rana" Singh Ahlawat: Kailash and Kamla's son; Pragya's brother; Lucky's cousin; Pinky's husband (2016–2018)
- Antara Banerjee as Pinky Ahlawat: Rana's wife (2016–2018)
- Karmveer Choudhary as Kailash Singh Ahlawat: Raghubir and Chhoto's brother; Kamla's husband; Rana and Pragya's father (2016–2018)
- Sangeeta Panwar as Kamla Ahlawat: Kailash's wife; Rana and Pragya's mother (2016–2018)
- Nishi Singh / Ashima Khan as Pragya Ahlawat Singh: Kamla and Kailash's son; Rana's sister; Lucky's cousin; Vardaan's wife (2016–2018)
- Shagun Pandey as Vardaan Singh: Jamuna and Shamsher's younger son; Prithvi and Badho's brother; Pragya's husband (2016–18)
- Geeta Udeshi as Jamuna Singh: Shamsher's wife; Prithvi, Badho and Vardaan's mother (2016–2018)
- Juhi Aslam as Arshpreet "Chhoto" Ahlawat: Kailash and Raghubir's sister; Rana, Lucky and Pragya's aunt (2016–2018)
- Arsha Goswami as Bharpai
- Rupali Ganguli as Payal Gupta Singh: Prithvi's wife (2016–2018)
- Zeena Bhatia as Laxmi Paresh Gupta:
- Jaswinder Kumar as Jitesh Solanki
- Ankush Bhaskar as Ajay, Lucky's Friend
- Paras Chhabra as Tejinder Singh (Teji/Jatta), Pragya's ex-lover
- Rahul Rana as Vijay, Pradhan Singh's son

=== Cameo ===
- Ghanshyam Tilawat as ex-Sarpanch
- Rajeev Singh as Sangram Singh
- Sapnaa Nahar as Sita
- Kanika Mann as Titli (2018)
- Yasemin Delikan as Margery (2016)
- Ankit Arora as Balwinder Singh, Rana's Wrestling Coach (2017)
- Ram Mehar Jangra as Producer Kapoor (2017)
- Jaya Bhattacharya as Sushma (2018)
- RJ Alok as Radio Jockey (2017)
- Arti Singh as Amba (2016, 2017)
- Shweta Mehta as Lavina (2017)

== Adaptations ==
Language	Title	Original release	Network(s)	Last aired	Notes
Kannada	Brahmagantu ಬ್ರಹ್ಮಗಂಟು	8 May 2017	Zee Kannada	9 July 2021	Remake
Telugu	Gundamma Katha గుండమ్మ కథ	9 April 2018	Zee Telugu	Ongoing	Remake
Tamil	Oru Oorla Oru Rajakumari ஒரு ஊர்ல ஒரு ராஜகுமாரி	23 April 2018	Zee Tamil	24 October 2021	Remake
Malayalam	Swathi Nakshatram Chothi സ്വാതി നക്ഷത്രം ചോതി	26 November 2018	Zee Keralam	27 March 2020	Remake
