= Dance Deewane Juniors =

- Logo of Dance Deewane
- Hosted by: Karan Kundrra
- Judges: Neetu Singh; Nora Fatehi; Marzi Pestonji
- No. of contestants: 15
- No. of episodes: 24

Release
- Original network: Colors TV
- Original release: 23 April – 17 July 2022

Dance Deewane Junior is a spin-off season of the Indian dance reality television series Dance Deewane that premiered from 23 April 2022 to 17 July 2022 on Colors TV.

== Production ==
Dance Deewane Juniors started on 23 April 2022. On 10 April 2022 a promo was released on Colors TV's official Instagram. The show is hosted and presented by Karan Kundrra and judged by Neetu Singh, Nora Fatehi and Marzi Pestonji.

== Gangs ==
The choreographers of the show were Tushar Shetty, Sonali Kar and Pratik Utekar.

| Battle | Winner Gang |
|---|---|
| Week 1 | Gang Pratik |
| Week 2 | Gang Tushar |
| Week 3 | Gang Tushar |
| Week 4 | Gang Sonali |
| Week 5 | Gang Pratik |
| Week 5 | Gang Sonali |
| Week 5 | Gang Tushar |

== Contestants ==
The top 15 contestants were chosen.

- Solo
- Duo
- Group

| Name | Age | Category | Status | Position |
|---|---|---|---|---|
| Aditya Patil | 8 | Solo | Ultimate Winner; Episode 26 | 1st |
| Geet Kaur Bagga | 9 | Solo | Runner-up; Episode 26 | 2nd |
| Prateek Kumar | 13 | Solo | Finalists; Episode 24 | 3rd |
| All Stars | 7-13 | Group | Finalists; Episode 24 | 3rd |
| Riddhi Sadrani | 7 | Solo | Eliminated; Episode 22 | 5th |
| Anshika Dhara | 12 | Solo | Eliminated; Episode 14 | 6th |
| MD Raish | 13 | Solo | Eliminated; Episode 14 | 6th |
| Falak Saifi | 8 | Solo | Eliminated; Episode 20 | 8th |
| Classical Queens | 10-13 | Group | Eliminated; Episode 20 | 8th |
| Priyanshi Kanarji | 10 | Solo | Eliminated; Episode 20 | 8th |
| C Company | 9-13 | Group | Eliminated; Episode 20 | 8th |
| Opps Crew | 8-14 | Group | Eliminated; Episode 20 | 8th |
| Yash and Aradhya | 11-12 | Duo | Eliminated; Episode 14 | 13th |
| Runjuna Das | 10 | Solo | Eliminated; Episode 14 | 13th |
| Arnav Talukdar | 10 | Solo | Eliminated; Episode 14 | 13th |

indicates Gang Pratik.
indicates Gang Sonali.
indicates Gang Tushar.

== Elimination chart ==
| Week | 1 | 2 | 3 | 4 | | 5 | 6 | | 7 | 8 | 9 | 10-Finale |
| Episodes | 7-8 | 9-10 | 11-12 | 13-14 | | 15-16 | 17-18 | | 19 | 20 | 21-22 | 23-24 |
| Aditya Patil | PLAY | WIN | SAFE | LOST | IMMU | SAFE | WIN | TOP 7 | SAFE | FAB5 | TOP 4 | ULTIMATE WINNER |
| Geet Kaur Bagga | SAFE | SAFE | WIN | WIN | SAFE | WIN | WIN | TOP 7 | SAFE | FAB5 | TOP 4 | RUNNER-UP |
| Prateek Kumar Naik | SAFE | WIN | SAFE | WIN | SAFE | SAFE | WIN | TOP 7 | SAFE | FAB5 | TOP 4 | FINALISTS |
| All Stars | PLAY | WIN | WIN | WIN | IMMU | LOST | WIN | TOP 7 | SAFE | FAB5 | TOP 4 | FINALISTS |
| Riddhi Sadrani | SAFE | SAFE | SAFE | SAFE | SAFE | WIN | WIN | TOP 7 | SAFE | FAB5 | REWIND | |
| Anshika Dhara | PLAY | LOST | WIN | SAFE | IMMU | WIN | WIN | TOP 7 | SAFE | REWIND | | |
| MD Raish | SAFE | - | WIN | WIN | SAFE | WIN | WIN | TOP 7 | SAFE | REWIND | | |
| Falak Saifi | SAFE | SAFE | SAFE | SAFE | SAFE | WIN | WIN | REWIND | | | | |
| Classical Queens | PLAY | SAFE | LOST | SAFE | SAFE | WIN | WIN | REWIND | | | | |
| Priyanshi Kanarji | PLAY | SAFE | SAFE | SAFE | SAFE | WIN | WIN | REWIND | | | | |
| C Company | SAFE | WIN | WIN | SAFE | SAFE | SAFE | WIN | REWIND | | | | |
| Opps Crew | PLAY | WIN | LOST | SAFE | SAFE | SAFE | WIN | REWIND | | | | |
| Yash & Aradhya | SAFE | SAFE | SAFE | WIN | REWIND | | | | | | | |
| Runjuna Das | SAFE | SAFE | WIN | LOST | REWIND | | | | | | | |
| Arnav Talukdar | SAFE | SAFE | SAFE | SAFE | REWIND | | | | | | | |

- Week 2 to 6 judges decided which one contestant made it to the Top 7.
- In Week 4 & 6, judges decided contestants to be eliminated.
- From Week 7, public votes were opened and based on public votes eliminations took place.

The contestant was the Winner.
The contestant was the Runner-up.
The contestants were Finalists & eliminated during the final.
The contestants won entry to TOP 6 and were immune.
The contestant received all 3 Plays (Week 1) or won Dance Battle (Week 2-6).
The contestant won Hard 4 Challenge of the week (Week 2-4) or was Top 2/3 Gangs of the week (Week 5-6) .
The contestant was safe.
The contestant was lost Dance Battle.
The contestant didn't perform that week in Dance Battle.
The contestant was Eliminated.
The contestant was injured and had to leave the competition.

=== Hard 4 Challenges ===
| Week | Episode | Challenge No. | Challenge | Challenge Description | Challenged Contestant Gangs | | |
|---|---|---|---|---|---|---|---|
| Week | Episode | Challenge No. | Challenge | Challenge Description | Pratik | Sonali | Tushar |
| 2 | 9 | 1 | Dance to Impress | Contestants had to dance on any Badshah's song. | Opps Crew | Priyanshi | Riddhi |
| 2 | 9 | 1 | Dance to Impress | Contestants had to dance on any Badshah's song. | "Paagal" | "Bolo Har Har Har" | "Kar Gayi Chull" |
| 2 | 9 | 2 | Fab Fusion | Contestants had to fusion multiple dance forms. | Arnav | Classical Queens | All Stars |
| 2 | 9 | 2 | Fab Fusion | Contestants had to fusion multiple dance forms. | Old School & Lyrical | Bharatanatyam & Paso Doble | House, Shuffle & Bollywood |
| 2 | 10 | 3 | Dance with Captains | Contestants had to dance with their choreographer Captains. | Aditya | Geet | Falak |
| 2 | 10 | 4 | Best Foot Forward | Contestants had to show their best dance. | C Company | Runjuna | Yash & Aradhya |
| 3 | 11 | 1 | Dance to Impress | Contestants had to impress Akshay Kumar with their dance. | Prateek | Raish | Falak |
| 3 | 11 | 2 | Best Foot Forward | Contestants had to perform a never before seen unique dance. | Arnav | Priyanshi | Anshika |
| 3 | 12 | 3 | Dance with Captains | Contestants had to dance with their choreographer Captains. | C Company | Runjuna | Riddhi |
| 3 | 12 | 4 | Fab Fusion | Contestants had to fusion multiple dance forms. | Aditya | Geet | Yash & Aradhya |
| 3 | 12 | 4 | Fab Fusion | Contestants had to fusion multiple dance forms. | Kalaripayattu Contemporary | Odissi with Bollywood | Lyrical, Tracing & Threading |
| 4 | 13 | 1 | Dance to Impress | Contestants had to dance on any Shilpa Shetty's song. | C Company | Geet | Anshika |
| 4 | 13 | 1 | Dance to Impress | Contestants had to dance on any Shilpa Shetty's song. | "Tum Dil Ki Dhadkan Mein" | "Main Aai Hoon U.P. Bihar Lootne" | "Chura Ke Dil Mera" |
| 4 | 13 | 2 | Fab Fusion | Contestants had to fusion multiple dance forms. | Opps Crew | Raish | Riddhi |
| 4 | 13 | 2 | Fab Fusion | Contestants had to fusion multiple dance forms. | Hip Hop & Bihu | Contemporary & Mallakhamb | Afro & Cabaret |
| 4 | 14 | 3 | Dance with Captains | Contestants had to dance with their choreographer Captains. | Arnav | Priyanshi | All Stars |
| 4 | 14 | 4 | Best Foot Forward | Contestants had to perform a next level dance performance. | Prateek | Classical Queens | Falak |
| 5 | 16 | Retro Special (secret score) | Dance with Captains | Contestants had to dance with their choreographer Captains. | Aditya | Classical Queens | Falak |
| 5 | 16 | Retro Special (secret score) | Best Foot Forward | Contestants had to perform a next level dance performance. | Prateek | Geet | Anshika |
| 6 | 18 | Captains | | | Gang Pratik | Gang Sonali | Gang Tushar |
| 6 | 18 | 1 | Captains Switch-Swap | Choreographer Captains had to dance with other gang's contestants. | Riddhi | Aditya | Geet |
| 6 | 18 | 2 | Captains Switch-Swap | Captains had to choreograph for other gang's contestants. | Classical Queens | All Stars | Opps Crew |

The contestant won the challenge from their Gang.

=== Gangs Score Board ===
| Gang | Week 2 | Week 3 | Week 4 | Week 5 | Week 6 | Total Points | Total wins |
|---|---|---|---|---|---|---|---|
| Pratik | 3 points | 1 point | 1 point | Lost | Won | 5 | 2 |
| Sonali | 0 points | 3 points | 2 points | Won | Won | 5 | 4 |
| Tushar | 1 point | 1 point | 1 point | Won | Won | 3 | 2 |

=== Hardcore Dance Battle ===
| Week | Episode | TOP 2/TOP 3 Gangs of the week | | | | | Winning Gang | Entry to Hardcore TOP 6 (TOP 7 Week 6 Twist) |
| 2 | 10 | Gang Pratik; Prateek | | vs. | Gang Tushar; Anshika Dhara | | Gang Pratik | Aditya Patil |
| 3 | 12 | Gang Sonali; Classical Queens | vs. | Gang Pratik; Opps Crew | vs. | Gang Tushar; All Stars | Gang Tushar | All Stars |
| 4 | 14 | Gang Sonali; Runjuna | vs. | Gang Pratik; Aditya | vs. | Gang Tushar; Yash & Aradhya | Gang Tushar | Anshika Dhara |
| 5 | 16 | Gang Sonali; MD Raish | | vs. | Gang Tushar; All Stars | | Gang Sonali | MD Raish |
| 6 | 18 | Gang Sonali; MD Raish | vs. | Gang Pratik; Prateek | vs. | Gang Tushar; Anshika Dhara | Gang Tushar | Riddhi |
| 6 | 18 | Gang Sonali; MD Raish | vs. | Gang Pratik; Prateek | vs. | Gang Tushar; Anshika Dhara | Gang Sonali | Geet |
| 6 | 18 | Gang Sonali; MD Raish | vs. | Gang Pratik; Prateek | vs. | Gang Tushar; Anshika Dhara | Gang Pratik | Prateek |

=== Hardcore top 5 with dancing star ===
| Contestant | Dancing star |
|---|---|
| Prateek | Piyush Gurbhele |
| All Stars | Aryan Patra |
| Geet | Shweta Warrier |
| Aditya | Paramdeep Singh |
| Riddhi | Vartika Jha |

== Guests ==
| Guest(s) | Reason | Episode |
|---|---|---|
| Tiger Shroff; Tara Sutaria | To Promote Heropanti 2 | 1-2 |
| Ranveer Singh | To Promote Jayeshbhai Jordaar | 7 |
| Kartik Aaryan; Kiara Advani | To Promote Bhool Bhulaiyaa 2 | 8 |
| Badshah | To Promote His Song Voodoo | 9 |
| Ayushmann Khurrana | To Promote Anek | 10 |
| Akshay Kumar; Manushi Chhillar | To Promote Samrat Prithviraj | 11 |
| Shilpa Shetty | To Promote Nikamma | 13-14 |
| Usha Uthup | Retro special | 15 |
| Jennifer Winget | To Promote Her Series Code M | 15 |
| Tejasswi Prakash | For Karan Kundrra | 16 |
| Anil Kapoor; Varun Dhawan; Kiara Advani | To Promote Jugjugg Jeeyo | 17 |
| Paramdeep Singh | To Support Aditya Patil | 19 |
| Piyush Gurbhele (Winner of Dance Deewane 3) | To Support Prateek Kumar Naik | 19 |
| Jasmin Bhasin | To Promote Her Song Is Baarish Mein | 19 |
| Gunjan Sinha (Finalist of Dance Deewane 3) | To Support All Stars | 19 |
| Somansh Dangwal (Finalist of Dance Deewane 3) | To Support MD Raish | 19 |
| Farah Khan | Special Appearance | 20 |
| Terence Lewis | Song Promotion | 21 |
| Mithali Raj; Taapsee Pannu | To Promote Shabaash Mithu | 21 |
| Tejasswi Prakash; Rubina Dilaik; Sriti Jha; Rashami Desai; Tushar Kalia; Amruta Khanvilkar; Nishant Bhat; Pratik Sehajpal | To support Aditya Patil via video | 21 |
| Ranbir Kapoor; Vaani Kapoor | To Promote Shamshera | Semi-Finale |
| Aamir Khan | To Promote Laal Singh Chaddha | Grand Finale |
| Surabhi Das; Simba Nagpal; Tejasswi Prakash; Kunal Jaisingh; Tanvi Dogra; Anchal Sahu | Part of Colors TV family | Grand Finale |
| Yo Yo Honey Singh; Gurdas Mann; Karan Aujla; AP Dhillon; Rekha | Special appearance | Grand Finale |
