= Jhalak Dikhhla Jaa season 10 =

Jhalak Dikhhla Jaa
- Season 10
- Jhalak Dikhhla Jaa Season 10 Title Screen
- Starring: See Below
- Presented by: Manish Paul; Arjun Bijlani (Week 10)
- Judges: Karan Johar; Madhuri Dixit; Nora Fatehi; Terence Lewis (weeks 9, 11, 13)
- No. of contestants: 16
- Celebrity winner: Gunjan Sinha
- Professional winner: Tejas Verma
- Winning mentor: Sagar Bora
- No. of episodes: 26 (list of episodes)

Release
- Original network: Colors TV
- Original release: 3 September – 27 November 2022

Season chronology
- ← Previous; Season 9 Next → Season 11

Jhalak Dikhhla Jaa 10 is the tenth season of Jhalak Dikhhla Jaa, an Indian reality and dance television series produced by BBC Worldwide Productions Company. The season was hosted by Manish Paul and judged by Karan Johar, Madhuri Dixit, Nora Fatehi, and Terence Lewis. The series premiered from 3 September 2022 to 27 November 2022 on Colors TV and digitally streamed on Voot. Gunjan Sinha emerged as the winner of the show.

== Cast ==
Note:- Since only Winner was announced among the Top 3 and Top 3 among the Top 5, average score of the contestants determine their ranks considering the international format stated in the show.

Celebrity	Notability	Professional Partner	Status	Ref.
Ali Asgar	Comedian	Lipsa Acharya	Eliminated 1st on 18 September 2022	
Dheeraj Dhoopar	Actor	Sneha Singh	Withdrew on 25 September 2022	
Dutee Chand	Sprinter	Raveena Choudhary	Withdrew on 2 October 2022	
Zorawar Kalra	Chef	Suchitra Sawant	Eliminated 2nd on 9 October 2022	
Shilpa Shinde	Actress	Nischhal Sharma	Eliminated 3rd on 16 October 2022	
Ada Malik	Designer	Shyam Yadav	Eliminated 4th on 30 October 2022	
Paras Kalnawat	Actor	Shweta Sharda	Eliminated 5th on 6 November 2022	
Amruta Khanvilkar	Actress	Pratik Utekar	Eliminated 6th on 6 November 2022	
Nia Sharma	Actress	Tarun Raj	Eliminated 7th on 20 November 2022	
Niti Taylor	Actress	Akash Thapa	Eliminated 8th on 20 November 2022	
Nishant Bhat	Dancer and Bigg Boss runner-up	Anuradha Iyengar	Sixth Place on 27 November 2022	
Sriti Jha	Actress	Vivek Chachere	Fifth Place on 27 November 2022	
Gashmeer Mahajani	Actor	Romsha Singh	Fourth place on 27 November 2022	
Faisal Shaikh	Digital Influencer	Vaishnavi Patil	Third place on 27 November 2022	
Rubina Dilaik	Actress and Bigg Boss winner	Sanam Johar	Runners-up on 27 November 2022	
Gunjan Sinha	Dancer	Tejas Verma	Winners on 27 November 2022	

== Scoring chart ==
The highest score each week is indicated in bold green with a dagger (†), while the lowest score each week is indicated in italic red with a double-dagger (‡).

Colour key:

Winners
Runners-up
Third place
Fourth place
Fifth place
Sixth place
Excused from competition for the week
Withdrew from competition
Bottom two
Eliminated
Dance prior to results, later eliminated

Jhalak Dikhhla Jaa (season 10) - Weekly Scores
Couple	Pl.	Week												
Couple	Pl.	2	3	4	5	6	7	8	9 (Note: The couples were scored on a 20-point scale due to it being a team-based week.)	10 (Note: The professional partners were swapped for this week, scores mentioned are of the celebrity, full list is given below.)	11	12	13	12+13
Gunjan & Tejas	1st	**24**†	27	28	**30**†	**30**†	**30**† (Note: This contestant won golden chair that week and was immuned from elimination.)	**30**†	**20**†	**30**†	**30**†	30+10=**40**†	**30**†	**70**† (Note: This couple finished in first place.)
Rubina & Sanam	2nd	21	24	**30**†	27	27	**30**†	27	**20**†	24‡	29	27+7=34‡	**30**†	64 (Note: This couple finished in second place.)
Faisal & Vaishnavi	3rd	22	24	24	27	26	**30**†	27	**20**†	**30**†	27	26+8=34‡	27	61 (Note: This couple finished in third place.)
Gashmeer & Romsha	4th	**24**†	26	**30**†	**30**†	29	**30**†	(Note: This couple was excused from competition due to illness or injury, and was granted a bye to the following week.)	19	**30**†	29	27+9=36	**30**†	66 (Note: This couple finished in fourth place.)
Sriti & Vivek	5th					—	25	24	**20**†	28	**30**†	27+7=34‡	26‡	60‡ (Note: This couple finished in fifth place.)
Nishant & Anuradha	6th					—	**30**†	27	**20**†	27	**30**†	30+9=39	**30**†	69 (Note: This couple finished in sixth place.)
Niti & Akash	7th	20	27	28	**30**†	**30**†	**30**†	29	17	28	24‡ (Note: This couple was eliminated after performing the next week.)	30+10=**40**† (Note: This couple was eliminated after this week's performance in the results of previous week.)		
Nia & Tarun	8th	**24**†	**29**†	29	29	**30**†	23	24	**20**†	**30**†	28	29+8=37		
Amruta & Prateek	9th	**24**†	26	**30**†	**30**†	**30**†	**30**†	27	18	25				
Paras & Shweta	10th	21	27	26	27	23‡	25	26	18	27				
Ada & Shyam	11th					—	21‡	23‡	16‡					
Shilpa & Niscchal	12th	21	24	20‡	24	26								
Zorawar & Suchitra	13th	18‡ (Note: This couple was in the bottom two, but was not eliminated.)	21	22	20‡	24								
Dutee & Raveena	14th		—	21	(Note: This couple withdrew from the competition.)									
Dheeraj & Sneha	15th	18‡	20‡											
Ali & Lipsa	16th	18‡	24											

== Twists ==
=== Jhalak Passport ===
One of the twists that featured in this season was "Jhalak Passport". The Jhalak Passport of contestants whose performances impressed the judges will receive the Golden Stamp and the recipients will become contenders for the Golden Chair.

==== Golden Stamp winners ====
Contestants	Week 2	Week 3	Week 4	Week 5	Week 6	Week 7	Week 8	Week 9^{1}	Week 10	Week 11	Week 12^{2}	Week 13
Gunjan	Green checkmark				Green checkmark	Green checkmark	Green checkmark	—N/a	Green checkmark	Green checkmark	—N/a	
Rubina			Green checkmark	Green checkmark	Green checkmark	Green checkmark	Green checkmark	—N/a		Green checkmark	—N/a	
Faisal				Green checkmark		Green checkmark	Green checkmark	—N/a	Green checkmark	Green checkmark	—N/a	
Gashmeer	Green checkmark	Green checkmark	Green checkmark	Green checkmark	Green checkmark	Green checkmark		—N/a	Green checkmark	Green checkmark	—N/a	
Sriti								—N/a	Green checkmark	Green checkmark	—N/a	
Nishant						Green checkmark	Green checkmark	—N/a		Green checkmark	—N/a	
Niti		Green checkmark	Green checkmark	Green checkmark	Green checkmark	Green checkmark	Green checkmark	—N/a			—N/a	
Nia	Green checkmark	Green checkmark	Green checkmark	Green checkmark	Green checkmark			—N/a	Green checkmark	Green checkmark	—N/a	
Amruta	Green checkmark		Green checkmark	Green checkmark	Green checkmark	Green checkmark	Green checkmark	—N/a				
Paras		Green checkmark		Green checkmark			Green checkmark	—N/a	Green checkmark			
Ada								—N/a				
Shilpa				Green checkmark								
Zorawar					Green checkmark							
Dutee												
Dheeraj												
Ali												

1. There was no "Golden Stamp" given in Week 9 due to participants performing for their respective teams and it was announced that all participating celebrity couples from the winning team will be eligible for "Golden Chair" and the losing team couples will face elimination in the following week.
2. No "Golden Stamp" and "Golden Chair" were given in weeks 12 and 13 due to them being semi-finale and grand-finale weeks respectively.

=== Golden Chair ===
This season of Jhalak Dikhhla Jaa introduced a first-of-its-kind Golden Chair system in which the contestant winning the Golden Chair will be immune from elimination for the following week.

Gashmeer Mahajani and Romsha Singh became the first participating couple to win the Golden Chair twice and became immune from elimination for the Week 3 and then again in Week 4.

Nia Sharma, Amruta Khanvilkar, Gunjan Sinha, Niti Taylor and Faisal Shaikh have won the Golden Chair since then.

=== Voting and elimination ===
The show follows its traditional elimination policy of grand total of judges' scores and audience votings for the bottom two contestants. The contestant in the bottom two with least number of combined judges' scores and audience votings is eliminated in the following week at the end of Sunday's episode.

== Themes ==
The celebrities and professional partners danced one of these routines for each corresponding week:

- Week 1: Introduction and Jhalak Passport
- Week 2: Retro Special (Life in a Retro)
- Week 3: Family Special (Mera Parivaar, Best Parivaar)
- Week 4: Bollywood Special and Mahasangam with Khatron Ke Khiladi 12
- Week 5: Jhalak of India
- Week 6: Kapoor Special
- Week 7: Desh Ki Demand
- Week 8: Diwali Special
- Week 9: Dance War (Madhuri Ke Rockstars vs Karan Ke Johars)
- Week 10: Adla-Badli (Partner-swapping)
- Week 11: 90s Special
- Week 12: Blockbuster Semi-Finale
- Week 13: Grand Finale

Week 3 was themed 'Family' Special, and each of the participating celebrities dedicated their performances (Dutee gave her introductory performance this week) as follows:

- Ali & Lipsa: His fictional character Dadi
- Amruta & Pratik: Her mother
- Dheeraj & Sneha: His wife
- Faisal & Vaishnavi: His friends
- Gashmeer & Romsha: His mother
- Gunjan & Tejas: Her father
- Niti & Akash: Karan Johar as a father
- Nia & Tarun: Her brother
- Paras & Shweta: His deceased father
- Rubina & Sanam: Her husband
- Shilpa & Nishchal: Her disloyal family
- Zorawar & Suchitra: His co-workers and friends

Week 4 was themed "Bollywood Special" and Mahasangam (merger) with Khatron Ke Khiladi 12 finale, and each participating celebrity gave tribute to iconic actors of Bollywood by performing their iconic songs in Khatron Ke Khiladi style as follows:

- Amruta and Ashish: Madhuri Dixit doing Kathak and Bharatnatyam her iconic song Dola Re Dola^{1}
- Dutee and Raveena: Aamir Khan and Rani Mukerjee performing their iconic song Aati Kya Khandala
- Faisal and Vaishnavi: Ajay Devgan performing his iconic song Singham on a see-saw-like platform
- Gashmeer and Romsha: Shah Rukh Khan performing a mash-up of his iconic songs Chhaiyya Chhaiyya, Dard-e-Disco and Tumse Milke Dil Ka Hai Jo Haal on a rostrum
- Gunjan and Tejas: Preity Zinta and Hrithik Roshan performing a mash-up of their iconic songs Bumbro Bumbro and Rind Posh Maal
- Niti and Akash: Nargis Dutt and Raj Kapoor performing their iconic song Pyaar Hua Ikraar Hua
- Nia and Tarun: Raveena Tandon performing her iconic song Tip Tip Barsa Pani on a rotating platform with a pole
- Paras and Shweta: Hrithik Roshan and Preity Zinta performing their iconic song It's Magic
- Rubina and Sanam: Priyanka Chopra performing her iconic song Ram Chahe Leela with a blindfold and Aerial Silk
- Shilpa and Nishchal: Sridevi performing her iconic song Naino Mein Sapna
- Zorawar and Suchitra: Mithun Chakraborty performing a mash-up of his iconic songs I'm a Disco Dancer and Yaad Aa Raha Hai Tera Pyaar on a spinning platform

Week 5 was themed "Jhalak of India" and each participating celebrity represented a state in India with that state's signature traditional dresses:

- Amruta and Pratik: Representing Maharashtra
- Dutee and Raveena: Representing Karnataka
- Faisal and Vaishnavi: Representing Kerala
- Gashmeer and Romsha: Representing Tamil Nadu
- Gunjan and Tejas: Representing Assam
- Nia and Tarun: Representing Uttar Pradesh
- Niti and Akash: Representing Gujarat
- Paras and Shweta: Representing Rajasthan
- Rubina and Sanam: Representing Himachal Pradesh
- Shilpa and Nishchal: Representing Bihar
- Zorawar and Suchitra: Representing Punjab

Week 6 was themed "Kapoor Special" as a tribute to the Kapoors of Bollywood where Neetu Kapoor arrived as the guest for the same. Each of the participating celebrities gave their tribute to one member of Kapoor family by performing their iconic songs as follows^{2}:

- Amruta and Pratik: Tribute to Raj Kapoor by performing his iconic song Jeena Yahan Marna Yahan
- Faisal and Vaishnavi: Tribute to Shammi Kapoor by performing his iconic song Oh Haseena Zulfon Wali
- Gashmeer and Romsha: Tribute to Shashi Kapoor by performing his iconic song O Meri Sharmilee
- Gunjan and Tejas: Tribute to Kareena Kapoor by performing her iconic song You're My Soniya
- Nia and Tarun: Tribute to Prithviraj Kapoor by performing his iconic song Jab Pyaar Kiya Toh Darna Kya
- Niti and Akash: Tribute to Ranbir Kapoor and Alia Bhatt Kapoor by performing their iconic songs Khuda Jaane and Baba Mein Teri Malika.
- Paras and Shweta: Tribute to Ranbir Kapoor by performing his iconic song Badtameez Dil
- Rubina and Sanam: Tribute to Karisma Kapoor by performing her iconic song Le Gayi
- Shilpa and Nishchal: Tribute to Kareena Kapoor by performing her iconic song San Sana San
- Zorawar and Suchitra: Tribute to Rishi Kapoor

Week 7 was themed "Desh Ki Demand" where each participating celebrity performed the demand made to them:

- Ada and Shyam: Performed Drama Queen song fulfilling demand of "Showing her dramatic side"
- Amruta and Pratik: Performed Choli Ke Peechhe Kya Hai song fulfilling demand of "Madhuri Dixit's Song"
- Faisal and Vaishnavi:
- Gashmeer and Romsha: Performed Zingaat song fulfilling the demand of "Marathi Tadka"
- Gunjan and Tejas:
- Nia and Tarun: Performed Jagg Jeeteya song fulfilling demand of "Tribute to 2016 Surgical Strike"
- Nishant and Anuradha:
- Niti and Akash:
- Paras and Shweta: Performed Ae Dil Hai Mushkil song fulfilling demand of "One-sided obsessive love"
- Rubina and Sanam: Performed Mayya Mayya & Mashallah songs fulfilling demand of "Belly Dance"
- Sriti and Vivek: Performed Laal Ishq song fulfilling the demand of "Sringar ka Kumkum"

Week 8 was themed "Diwali Special" and each participating celebrity enacted either a particular god or a mythological character:

- Ada and Shyam:
- Amruta and Pratik: Enacted Lord Ram and Goddess Sita through the latter's Agnipariksha episode.
- Faisal and Vaishnavi:
- Gashmeer and Romsha: NOT IN COMPETITION^{3}
- Gunjan and Tejas: Enacted Lord Krishn and his separation from his flute Venu
- Nia and Tarun: Enacted Goddess Kali slaying the demon Raktbija
- Nishant and Anuradha: Enacted Ravan's slaying
- Niti and Akash: Enacted Goddess Ganga's descendant to Earth and Lord Shiva holding her on his head
- Paras and Shweta: Enacted Lord Krishn and Goddess Radha's childhood, love story and separation.
- Rubina and Sanam: Enacted Draupadi and her Cheerharan by Dushasana and its revenge by Bhima.
- Sriti and Vivek: Danced as devotees of Lord Ganesh; evoking Lord Ganesh.

Week 9 was themed 'Dance War' where the two judges (Nora and Karan) chose their teams within the participants and the one with more scores (average) wins. The winning team is safe from next week's eviction.

Category	Madhuri Ke Rockstars^{4}	Karan Ke Johars
Members	Amruta & Pratik, Gunjan & Tejas, Niti & Akash, Rubina & Sanam, Paras & Shweta, Ada & Shyam	Gashmeer & Romsha, Nishant & Anuradha, Faisal & Vaishnavi, Nia & Tarun, Sriti & Vivek
Average	18.6	19.8

Week 10 was themed 'Adla-Badli' where all the participating celebrities were asked to perform with the dancing partner of another celebrity instead of their original ones which were as follows:

Celebrity	Swapped Partner
Amruta	Sanam (Rubina's partner)
Faisal	Anuradha (Nishant's partner)
Gashmeer	Shweta (Paras' partner)
Gunjan	Akash & Tejas (Niti's partner along with her original partner)
Nia	Vivek (Sriti's partner)
Nishant	Romsha (Gashmeer's partner)
Niti	Sagar (Gunjan's mentor)
Paras	Vaishnavi (Faisal's partner)
Rubina	Pratik (Amruta's partner)
Sriti	Tarun (Nia's partner)

1. Amruta's choreographer Pratik was replaced by Ashish Patil for this week as the former was suffering from Dengue fever.
2. Sriti, Ada and Nishant gave their introductory performances this week.
3. Gashmeer didn't perform this week because he was down with Dengue fever.
4. In Week 9 Team "Madhuri Ke Rockstars" was initially termed as "Team Nora" with Nora as captain. But was renamed and replaced with Madhuri as Nora was replaced with Terence Lewis as a judge for the week.

== Dance chart ==
The couples performed the following each week:

- Weeks 1–11: One dance routine
- Week 12 (Semi-finals): One dance routine & dance relay
- Week 13 (Finals): Two dance routines

Jhalak Dikhhla Jaa (season 10) - Dance chart
Couple	Week														
Couple	1	2	3	4	5	6	7	8	9	10	11	12		13	
Gunjan & Tejas	Freestyle (Note: No scores were received for this dance.)	Hip hop & Lindy hop	Hip hop	Freestyle	Bihu	Old-school hip hop	Hip hop		Street Jazz	Krumping, Stomping & Hip hop	Chicago footwork	Tapori & Bolly.	Locking & Popping	Tollywood & Hip hop	Freestyle
Rubina & Sanam	Latin	Waltz	Contemp.	Aerial Silk	Nati	Bharatnatyam & Aerial	Belly dancing	Tandav & Nautanki	West Coast Swing	Kalbelia	Latin	Afro	Cha-cha-cha	Contemp.	Freestyle
Faisal & Vaishnavi	Bolly.	Paso doble	Bolly.	Freestyle	Kalaripayatu	Bolly.	Contemp.		Rock and Roll	Contemp.	Disco	Bolly.	Bolly.	Freestyle	Freestyle
Gashmeer & Romsha	Contemp.	Jazz	Bolly.	Freestyle	Kollywood & Dappankuthu	Afro, Salsa & Rumba	Tapori, Lezim & Moonwalk		Argentine Tango	Lyrical, Locking & popping	Bolly.	Bolly.	Locking & Popping	MJ	Freestyle
Sriti & Vivek						Fusion	Classical	Indian semi-classical	Hip Hop	Aerial	Bolly.	Bolly.	Indian semi-classical	Contemp.	Freestyle
Nishant & Anuradha						Semi-classical		Yakshagana	Belly Dance	Broadway Jazz	Lavani	Contemp.	Cha-cha-cha	Bhangra	Freestyle
Niti & Akash	Freestyle	Jive	Bolly.	Freestyle	Garba & Dandiya Raas	Contemp.			Cha-cha-cha	Hip hop	Salsa & Bolly.	Bolly.	Tango		
Nia & Tarun	Freestyle	Afro	Contemp. & Aerial	Acrobatics & Pole dance	Classical	Acrobatics & Waltz		Tandav	Salsa	Tollywood	Bolly.	Bolly. & Aerial	Contemp.		
Amruta & Pratik	Lavani	Vogue & Waacking	Sufi & Aerial	Kathak & Bharatnatyam	Gondhal & Jogwa	Contemporary & Contortion	Afro & Break Dancing	Kathak & Classical	Paso doble	Breaking & MJ					
Paras & Shweta	Hip hop	Tango	Contemp.	Zumba	Kathputli & Robotics	Locking and popping	Contemp.	Raas & Fusion	Waltz	Bolly. & Contemp.					
Ada & Shyam						Bolly.			Lyrical hip hop & Animation						
Shilpa & Nishchal	Bolly.	Freestyle	Contemp.	Bolly.	Bhojpuri	Paso doble & Samba									
Zorawar & Suchitra	Bolly.	Bolly.	Bolly.	Disco	Bhangra	Freestyle									
Dutee & Raveena			Bolly.	Freestyle	Puli Kali										
Dheeraj & Sneha	Aerial	Disco & Salsa	Bolly.												
Ali & Lipsa	Freestyle	Samba	Bolly.												

== Production ==
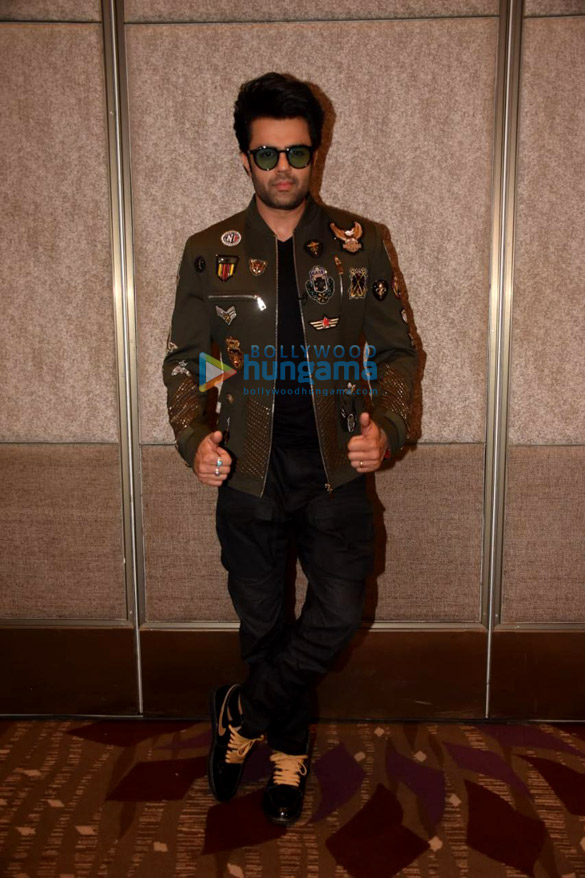
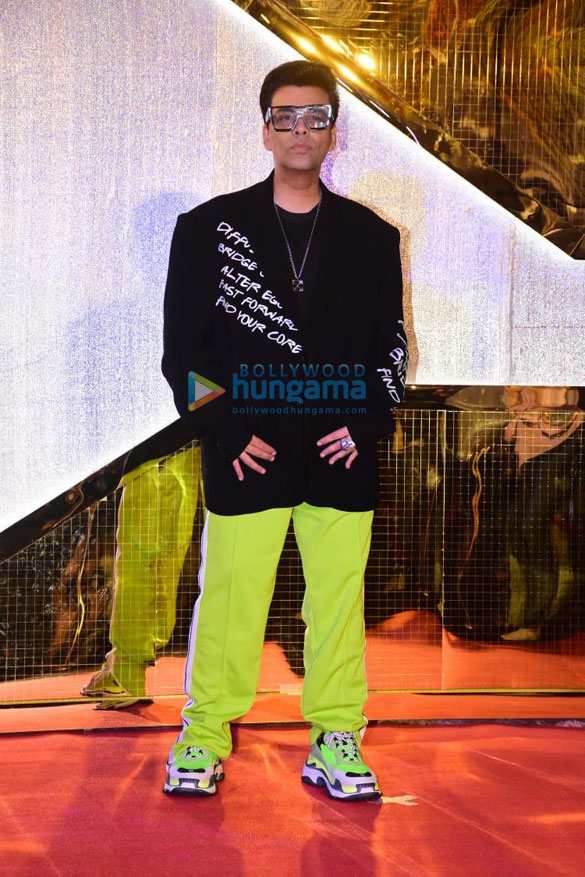
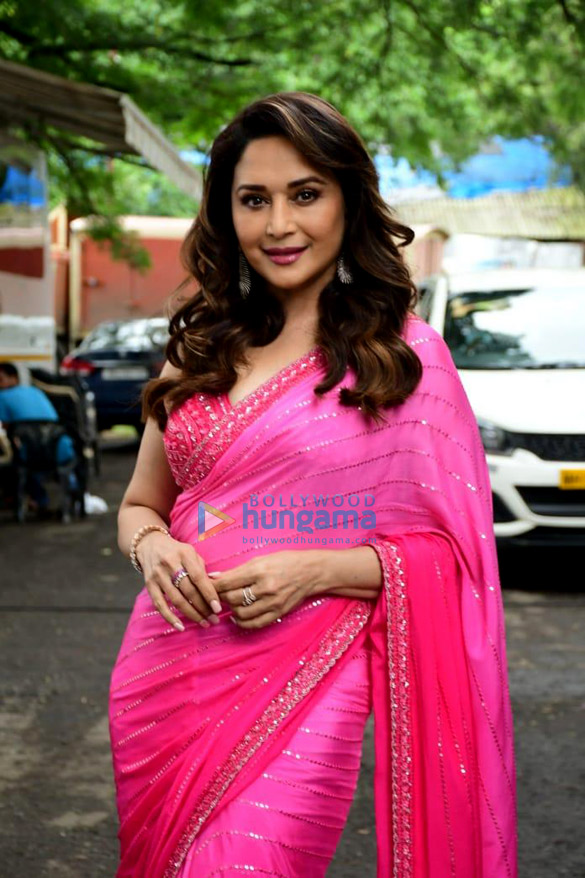
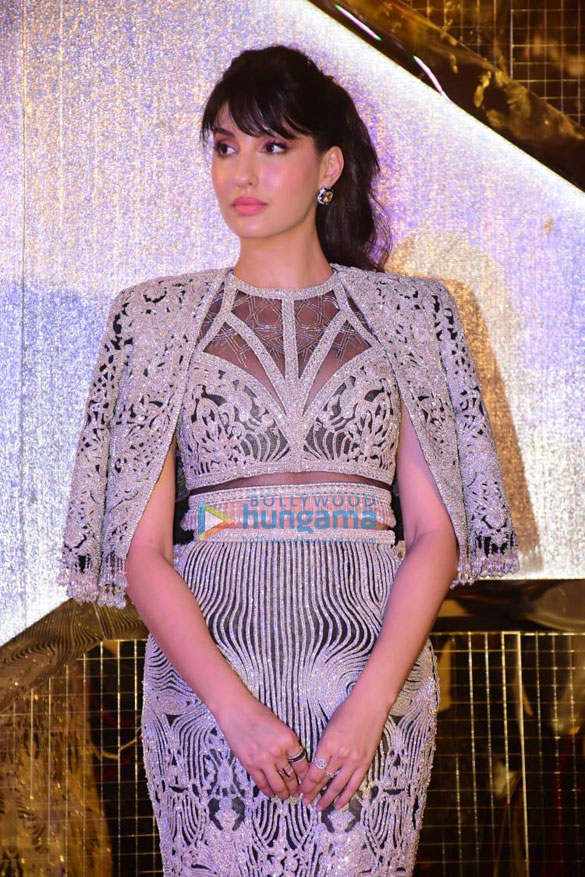
(left to right) Host Manish Paul, with judges Karan Johar, Madhuri Dixit and Nora Fatehi of Jhalak Dikhhla Jaa 10

Colors TV announced the comeback of series after a hiatus of five years in July 2022, with Manish Paul returning as host alongside Karan Johar, Madhuri Dixit and Nora Fatehi on the judges panel. The press conference and launch event for this season was held on 26 August 2022.

Speaking on the same, Chief Content Officer, Manisha Sharma, of Viacom18 said, "while five years is a big gap, the show has always had its audience, this is one of the most successful entertainment formats on Indian television and we are relishing our long-lasting relationship with BBC Worldwide Productions and look forward to many more such successful associations with them". The principal photography of the series commenced in August 2022 in Mumbai. Dixit, Fatehi and Johar, had been spotted shooting on Friday 5 August 2022. The shooting for the premiere week episodes started on 24 August 2022 at Film City, Mumbai. The contestants and judges were snapped shooting for the Retro Special week episodes which started on 5 September 2022. The judges and contestants were spotted shooting for the Family Special week episodes which started on 13 September 2022. The contestants and judges were snapped shooting for the Bollywood Special week episodes which started on 20 September 2022. The judges and contestants were spotted shooting for the Jhalak of India Special week episodes which started on 27 September 2022. The contestants and judges were snapped shooting for the Kapoor Special week episodes which started on 4 October 2022. The contestants and judges were spotted shooting for the Desh Ki Demand. Special week episodes which started on 11 October 2022.

The Grand Finale shooting was held on 22 November 2022 in Film City, Mumbai. On 25 July 2022, a promo revealing the season's logo was released on Colors TV official Instagram and Twitter handles.

== Episodes ==
No.	Title	Original release date
1	"Jhalak Dikhhla Jaa: Grand Opening"	3 September 2022
2	"Nia-Tarun's fierce vibe!"	4 September 2022
3	"Gashmeer vs Amruta"	10 September 2022
4	"The retro night special"	11 September 2022
5	"Rubina's gutsy marital story"	17 September 2022
6	"Amruta's tribute to her mother"	18 September 2022
7	"Rohit Shetty's Khatarnak challenges"	24 September 2022
8	"Madhuri's mesmerising performance"	25 September 2022
9	"Rashmika Mandanna on the show!"	1 October 2022
10	"Tejas-Gunjan scorch the stage!"	2 October 2022
11	"Aaj ke sham, Neetu ke naam!"	8 October 2022
12	"Amruta-Pratik's Spine-Chilling Act"	9 October 2022
13	"Sidharth Graces The Show"	15 October 2022
14	"Parineeti praises Faisal!"	16 October 2022
15	"Diwali special on Jhalak"	22 October 2022
16	"Aao manaye Choti Diwali!"	23 October 2022
17	"Janhvi's Dream Comes True!"	29 October 2022
18	"A Double XL twist!"	30 October 2022
19	"It's Time for Adla-Badli Week!"	5 November 2022
20	"Karan announces the results!"	6 November 2022
21	"The 90s Special Night!"	12 November 2022
22	"A ticket to the finale week!"	13 November 2022
23	"Kajol graces the semi-finale!"	19 November 2022
24	"Vicky-Madhuri's sizzling chemistry"	20 November 2022
25	"The Grand Finale begins!"	26 November 2022
26	"The final showdown!"	27 November 2022

== Guest appearances ==
Week(s)	Episode(s)	Guest(s)	Note(s)	Ref.
Week 3	Episodes 5-6	Vinay Sharma, Usha Sharma	To support their daughter and sister respectively Nia Sharma
Week 3	Episodes 5-6	Madhu Mahajani	To support her son Gashmeer Mahajani
Week 3	Episodes 5-6	Anita Kalnawat, Pragati Kalnawat Sharma, Navjot Sharma	To support their son, brother and brother-in-law respectively Paras Kalnawat
Week 3	Episodes 5-6	Team 07	To support their teammate Faisal Shaikh
Week 3	Episodes 5-6	Gauri Khanvilkar	To support her daughter Amruta Khanvilkar
Week 3	Episodes 5-6	Randhir Sinha	To support his daughter Gunjan Sinha
Week 3	Episodes 5-6	Ada Asgar, Nuyaan Asgar	To support their father Ali Asgar on video call
Week 4	Episodes 7-8	Rohit Shetty	In merger episode of Fear Factor: Khatron Ke Khiladi 12 Finale
Week 4	Episode 7	Jannat Zubair Rahmani	In merger episode of Fear Factor: Khatron Ke Khiladi 12 Finale
Week 4	Episode 7	Tushar Kalia	In merger episode of Fear Factor: Khatron Ke Khiladi 12 Finale
Week 4	Episode 8	Monalisa	To support her partner Dutee Chand on video call
Week 5	Episode 9	Rashmika Mandanna	To promote Goodbye film
Week 5	Episode 10	Gajraj Rao	To promote Maja Ma film
Week 6	Episode 11	Neetu Kapoor	For Kapoor Special
Week 6	Episode 11	Kili Paul	To interact with the participants
Week 6	Episode 12	Anu Malik	To support his daughter Ada Malik
Week 7	Episode 13	Sidharth Malhotra	To celebrate his tenth anniversary in the industry
Week 7	Episode 13	Terence Lewis, Siddharth Nigam	To support their student and friend respectively Paras Kalnawat via video call
Week 7	Episode 14	Harrdy Sandhu, Parineeti Chopra	To promote Code Name: Tiranga film
Week 7	Episode 14	Bhat Family	To support Nishant Bhat
Week 7	Episode 14	Jyotika Dilaik, Rajat Sharma	To support their sister and sister-in-law respectively Rubina Dilaik
Week 8	Episodes 15-16	Arun Govil, Dipika Chikhlia	To interact and celebrate Diwali with the participants
Week 9	Episodes 17-18	Terence Lewis	To replace Nora Fatehi as judge for Week 9
Week 9	Episode 17	Janhvi Kapoor	To promote Mili film
Week 9	Episode 18	Sonakshi Sinha, Huma Qureshi	To promote Double XL film
Week 10	Episode 19-20	Arjun Bijlani	To replace Manish Paul as host for Week 10
Week 10	Episode 19-20	Salman Yusuff Khan, Punit Pathak	As guest judges for "Adla-Badli" special
Week 11	Episode 21-22	Terence Lewis	To replace Karan Johar as judge for a week
Week 11	Episode 21	Ajay Devgn, Tabu	To promote Drishyam 2
Week 11	Episode 22	Vishal Mishra	To promote the song Aao Naa
Week 12	Episode 23	Kajol	To promote Salaam Venky
Week 12	Episode 23	Krystle D'Souza	To support her friend Nia Sharma
Week 12	Episode 23	Abhinav Shukla	To support his wife Rubina Dilaik
Week 12	Episode 24	Bhumi Pednekar, Vicky Kaushal, Shashank Khaitan	To promote Govinda Naam Mera film
Week 12	Episode 24	Shabir Ahluwalia, Rajiv Adatia	To support their friend Sriti Jha via video message
Week 12	Episode 24	Siddhartha Dey	Team support their writer
Finale Week	Episode 25	Ayushmann Khurrana, Jaideep Ahlawat	To promote An Action Hero
Finale Week	Episode 25	Madhu Mahajani	To support her son Gashmeer Mahajani
Finale Week	Episode 25	Fahmaan Khan	To promote Pyar Ke Saat Vachan Dharampatnii
Finale Week	Episode 25	Samir Kumaar Modi	To award Rubina Dilaik for Colorbar PowerKiss Dancing Diva
Finale Week	Episode 26	Kriti Sanon, Varun Dhawan	To promote film Bhediya
Finale Week	Episode 26	Terence Lewis	To support contestants in Finale
Finale Week	Episode 26	Salman Khan	To support and motivate Top 3

== Reception ==
Professional ratings
Review scores
Source	Rating
Mid-Day	3/5 stars
Rediff.com	3/5 stars

=== Critical response ===
Mid-Day called it an "entertaining ride", and particularly noted the VFX and the "glittering set [which] is high on opulence", but faulted it for its "heavy-handed dose of drama".

Rediff.com, reviewing the first two episodes, deemed them "not just high on entertainment, but also on dance".

The Times of India lauded the comeback, calling it "worth the wait", with participants who "prove their mettle" and "give a tough competition".

Pinkvilla, reviewing the Grand Finale episode, called it a "dance extravaganza and all glitz and glam", with an "entertainment quotient just kept increasing".
