= Shweta Sharda =

Indian model, dancer and beauty pageant titleholder (born 2001)

- Born: Chandigarh, India
- Occupation: Dancer
- Beauty pageant titleholder
- Title: Miss Diva 2023
- Major competitions: Miss Diva 2023; (Winner); Miss Universe 2023; (Top 20)

Shweta Sharda (Hindi: श्वेता शारदा) is an Indian dancer and beauty pageant titleholder who won Miss Universe India 2023. She represented India at Miss Universe 2023 held in El Salvador on 18 November 2023, and reached the top 20.

== Early life and career ==
Sharda has appeared in several reality shows, including Dance India Dance, Dance Deewane, and Dance+. She was also a choreographer on Jhalak Dikhhla Jaa 10. Sharda is a self-taught dancer and is known for her versatility and technical skills. She is also a choreographer and has choreographed several dance routines for television shows and music videos.

Sharda appeared in the music video of "Mast Aankhein" by Jubin Nautiyal and Tulsi Kumar opposite Bollywood actor Shantanu Maheshwari.

== Pageantry ==
=== Miss Diva 2023 ===
Sharda won Miss Diva 2023 on 28 August 2023 at The LaLit, Mumbai, against 15 other contestants. She also won the Miss Body Beautiful and Miss Talented awards.

Sharda was crowned by outgoing Miss Diva Universe 2022, Divita Rai as Miss Diva Universe 2023.

=== Miss Universe 2023 ===
Sharda represented India at Miss Universe 2023, held on 18 November 2023 at José Adolfo Pineda Arena, San Salvador, El Salvador. She reached the top 20.

== Filmography ==
=== Television ===
Year	Title	Role
2017-18	Dance India Dance 6	Contestant (10th place)
2018	Dance Deewane 1	Contestant (10th place)
2021	Dance Plus 6	Contestant (10th place)
2022	Jhalak Dikhhla Jaa 10	Choreographer

=== Music videos ===
Year	Title	Singer(s)	Ref.
2021	Ranjha Tere Naal	Nikhita Gandhi	
2021	Coco	Sukh-E Muzical Doctorz	
2021	Mitwa Go	Priteesh Kamat	
2021	Uncha Lamba Kad	Asees Kaur, Altamash Faridi	
2023	Mast Aankhein	Jubin Nautiyal, Tulsi Kumar	
2023	High Hukku	King, Nikhita Gandhi	
2024	Doriye	Varun Jain, Nikhita Gandhi	
2025	Tedhe Medhe	Khesari Lal Yadav, Shilpi Raj	

Awards and achievements
Preceded by Divita Rai	Miss Diva Universe; 2023	Succeeded by Rhea Singha
