= Dance Deewane season 2 =

2nd season

Dance Deewane
- Season 2
- Hosted by: Arjun Bijlani
- Judges: Madhuri Dixit; Tushar Kalia; Shashank Khaitan
- No. of contestants: 23
- Winners: Vishal Sonkar (Ultimate Winner); Tweesha Patel & Vihan Trivedi (Generation 1); Mehul Mehta (Generation 3)

Release
- Original network: Colors TV
- Original release: 15 June – 28 September 2019

Season chronology
- ← Previous; Season 1 Next → Season 3

Dance Deewane 2 is the Season 2 of Indian dance reality television series Dance Deewane that premiered on 15 June 2019 on Colors TV. The season is hosted by Arjun Bijlani.

== Judges ==
The following are the three judges of the season:

- Madhuri Dixit
- Tushar Kalia
- Shashank Khaitan

== Contestants ==
23 contestants were chosen, 8 from 1st & 2nd generation and 7 from 3rd generation. 5 Wild-Cards entered the competition in Week 8.

- 1st Generation: Kids
- 2nd Generation: Youth
- 3rd Generation: Seniors

Name	Age	Status	Place
Vishal Sonkar	21	Ultimate Winner; Episode 31	1st
Tweesha Patel & Vihaan Trivedi	5	1st Generation Winners; Episode 31	2nd
Mehul Mehta	37	3rd Generation Winner; Episode 31	2nd
Om Shubham Mahapatra	10	Runners-up; Episode 31	4th
Paramdeep Singh	17	Runners-up; Episode 31	4th
Sneha Adapawar	38	Runners-up; Episode 31	4th
Neerja Tiwari	7	Eliminated; Episode 30	7th
Muhammad Arsh Ali	8	Eliminated; Episode 30	7th
Aneesh Roy	10	Eliminated; Episode 30	7th
Kalpita Kachroo	22	Eliminated; Episode 30	7th
Soumya Shree	35	Eliminated; Episode 30	7th
Tushar Kaushik	17	Eliminated; Episode 28	13th
Shaina Lebana	23	Eliminated; Episode 24	16th
Urva Bhavsar	8	Eliminated; Episode 16	19th
Javed Chaudhari	25	Eliminated; Episode 16	19th
Raghu G	44	Eliminated; Episode 16	19th
Pratiti Das	8	Eliminated; Episode 12	22nd
Kanchi Shah	27	Eliminated; Episode 12	22nd
Rupesh Raj	52	Eliminated; Episode 12	22nd
Padmini Patnaik	18	Eliminated; Episode 10	25th
Juliana Mehta	37	Eliminated; Episode 10	25th
Gopal Patro	39	Withdrew; Episode 8	27th

=== Wild-Cards ===
Name	Age	Status	Place
Gannu Zoya	21	Eliminated; Episode 30	7th
Nagraj Shinde	11	Eliminated; Episode 24	13th
Ved Prakash	46	Eliminated; Episode 24	13th
Jigyasa Pradeep Bhoi	10	Eliminated; Episode 24	16th
Rupali Khanna	41	Eliminated; Episode 24	16th

Quit
Eliminated
Generation 1
Generation 2
Generation 3

== Summary ==
Week -	1	2	3	4	5	6	7	8	9	10	11	12	13	14
Episode -	5-6	7-8	9-10	11-12	13-14	15-16	17-18	19-20	21-22	23-24	25-26	27-28	29-30	31
Vishal	SAFE	PLAY	SAFE	PLAY	PLAY	SAFE	PLAY	PLAY	PLAY	PLAY	PLAY	PLAY	PLAY	ULTIMATE WINNER
Vihaan & Tweesha	SAFE	SAFE	PLAY	PLAY	SAFE	SAFE	SAFE	SAFE	SAFE	SAFE	PLAY	PLAY	PLAY	1st GENERATION WINNER
Mehul	SAFE	PLAY	BTM2	SAFE	PLAY	PLAY	PLAY	PLAY	SAFE	SAFE	PLAY	PLAY	PLAY	3rd GENERATION WINNER
Om Shubham	SAFE	PLAY	PLAY	PLAY	PLAY	BTM2	PLAY	SAFE	PLAY	PLAY	SAFE	PLAY	PLAY	FINALIST
Paramdeep	SAFE	PLAY	PLAY	PLAY	PLAY	SAFE	PLAY	PLAY	PLAY	PLAY	PLAY	PLAY	PLAY	FINALIST
Sneha	SAFE	SAFE	PLAY	SAFE	PLAY	PLAY	SAFE	PLAY	SAFE	BTM2	PLAY	PLAY	SAFE	FINALIST
Aneesh	SAFE	PLAY	PLAY	PLAY	PLAY	SAFE	SAFE	SAFE	PLAY	PLAY	PLAY	BTM2	REWIND	
Arsh	SAFE	PLAY	PLAY	PLAY	PLAY	PLAY	PLAY	SAFE	PLAY	PLAY	PLAY	PLAY	REWIND	
Neerja	SAFE	PLAY	PLAY	BTM2	PLAY	PLAY	SAFE	SAFE	PLAY	PLAY	PLAY	PLAY	REWIND	
Gannu	NOT IN COMPETITION							WILD-CARD	PLAY	PLAY	SAFE	BTM2	REWIND	
Kalpita	SAFE	PLAY	PLAY	PLAY	PLAY	PLAY	PLAY	SAFE	SAFE	SAFE	PLAY	SAFE	REWIND	
Soumya Shree	SAFE	SAFE	PLAY	SAFE	PLAY	BTM2	PLAY	PLAY	PLAY	SAFE	PLAY	BTM2	REWIND	
Nagraj	NOT IN COMPETITION							WILD-CARD	PLAY	BTM2	PLAY	REWIND		
Tushar	SAFE	PLAY	PLAY	BTM3	PLAY	BTM2	PLAY	SAFE	SAFE	BTM2	PLAY	REWIND		
Ved	NOT IN COMPETITION							WILD-CARD	PLAY	SAFE	PLAY	REWIND		
Jigyasa	NOT IN COMPETITION							WILD-CARD	PLAY	REWIND				
Shaina	SAFE	SAFE	SAFE	PLAY	PLAY	SAFE	PLAY	SAFE	SAFE	REWIND				
Rupali	NOT IN COMPETITION							WILD-CARD	SAFE	REWIND				
Urva	SAFE	PLAY	PLAY	PLAY	SAFE	REWIND								
Javed	SAFE	PLAY	SAFE	BTM3	PLAY	REWIND								
Rahgu	SAFE	SAFE	SAFE	SAFE	PLAY	REWIND								
Pratiti	SAFE	PLAY	PLAY	REWIND										
Kanchi	SAFE	PLAY	BTM2	REWIND										
Rupesh	SAFE	PLAY	SAFE	REWIND										
Padmini	SAFE	PLAY	REWIND											
Juliana	SAFE	SAFE	REWIND											
Gopal	SAFE	INJU												

The contestant is from 1st Generation.
The contestant is from 2nd Generation.
The contestant is from 3rd Generation.

The contestant was the Ultimate Winner.
The contestant was the Winner of their Generation.
The contestants were Finalists & eliminated during the final.
The contestant received all 3 Plays & moved on to next round.
The contestant received 2 Plays & moved on to next round.
The contestant was safe.
The contestant was got only 1 Play.
The contestant was in the bottom.
The contestant received Rewind & was Eliminated.
The contestant was injured and had to leave the competition.

== Guests ==
Episode	Guest(s)					Note
3-4	Bharti Singh		Harsh Limbachiyaa			Comedian Guests
5	Govinda					Guest Appearance
5	Hemant Brijwasi					Winner of Rising Star 2
6	Naezy					Rapper
7-8	Hrithik Roshan		Mrunal Thakur			To promote the film Super 30
9-10	Raghav Juyal	Punit Pathak		Dharmesh Yelande		Guest Appearance
11	Badshah					To promote his new song Paagal
12	Diljit Dosanjh		Kriti Sanon			To promote the film Arjun Patiala
13	Sidharth Malhotra		Parineeti Chopra			To promote the film Jabariya Jodi
14	Farah Khan					Guest Appearance
15-16	Saroj Khan		Sonakshi Sinha	Varun Sharma		To promote the film Khandaani Shafakhana
17	Akshay Kumar	Vidya Balan	Sonakshi Sinha	Taapsee Pannu	Nithya Menen	To promote the film Mission Mangal
20	Gaurav Dubey					Guest Appearance
23-24	Erica Fernandes	Surbhi Jyoti	Pearl V Puri	Jasmin Bhasin	Sidharth Shukla	Guest Appearance
25-26	Remo D'Souza					Guest Appearance
27	Ayushmann Khurrana		Nushrat Bharucha			To promote the film Dream Girl
28	Dharmendra		Sunny Deol	Karan Deol	Sahher Bambba	To promote the film Pal Pal Dil Ke Paas
29-30	Juhi Chawla					Guest Appearance
31- Final	Priyanka Chopra					To promote the film The Sky Is Pink
31- Final	Salman Khan					To promote Bigg Boss 13
