= Dance Deewane season 4 =

Indian dance reality television series season 4

Dance Deewane
- Season 4
- Hosted by: Bharti Singh
- Judges: Madhuri Dixit; Suniel Shetty
- No. of contestants: 32
- Winners: Gaurav Sharma & Nitin NJ
- No. of episodes: 33

Release
- Original network: Colors TV
- Original release: 3 February – 25 May 2024

Season chronology
- ← Previous; Season 3

Dance Deewane 4 is the fourth season of the Indian dance reality television series Dance Deewane. It premiered on 3 February 2024 on Colors TV. The winners were Gaurav Sharma & Nitin NJ.

== Production ==
Season 4 returned after 2 years hiatus, in November 2023 a promo was released on Colors TV. And Auditions were held in Mumbai and Delhi. Madhuri Dixit returned as a judge, joined with new judge Sunil Shetty on the panel. Dharmesh Yelande and Tushar Kalia were dropped from judges' panel. The show is hosted and presented by Bharti Singh. Harsh Lambachia were dropped as a co-host.

== Judges ==
The following are the judges of this season.

=== Main Judges ===
- Madhuri Dixit
- Suniel Shetty

=== Host ===
- Bharti Singh

== Contestants ==
Top 27 contestants were chosen from selected contestants in Auditions. 5 Wild-card contestants entered in week 5.

Name	Age	Paired with	Status	Place
Gaurav	22	Nitin	Ultimate Winners; 25 May 2024	1st
Nitin	18	Gaurav	Ultimate Winners; 25 May 2024	1st
Divansh	8	Harsha	Runners-up; 25 May 2024	3rd
Harsha	18	Divansh	Runners-up; 25 May 2024	3rd
Kashvi	10	Taranjot	Runners-up; 25 May 2024	3rd
Shrirang	39	Varsha	Runners-up; 25 May 2024	3rd
Taranjot	19	Kashvi	Runners-up; 25 May 2024	3rd
Varsha	37	Shrirang	Runners-up; 25 May 2024	3rd
Yuvraj	4	Yuvansh	Runners-up; 25 May 2024	3rd
Yuvansh	5	Yuvraj	Runners-up; 25 May 2024	3rd
Deepanita	6	none	Eliminated; 19 May 2024	13th
Isha	18	Siddharth	Eliminated; 19 May 2024	13th
Sargam & Mukesh	12 & 42	none	Eliminated; 19 May 2024	13th
Siddharth	16	Isha	Eliminated; 19 May 2024	13th
Anjali	25	Sharvari	Eliminated; 12 May 2024	17th
Sharvari	20	Anjali	Eliminated; 12 May 2024	17th
Rohit & Roshan	18 & 15	none	Eliminated; 28 April 2024	21st
Bina	44	Manjula & Shashi	Eliminated; 14 April 2024	22nd
Manjula	46	Shashi & Bina	Eliminated; 14 April 2024	22nd
Shashi	41	Bina & Manjula	Eliminated; 14 April 2024	22nd
Anwesha	28	Ashik	Eliminated; 10 March 2024	26th
Ashik	25	Anwesha	Eliminated; 10 March 2024	26th
Bishal	23	Sandeep	Eliminated; 10 March 2024	26th
Sandeep	30	Bishal	Eliminated; 10 March 2024	26th
Riyan	7	Tanya	Eliminated; 3rd March 2024	30th
Sunil	23	none	Eliminated; 3rd March 2024	30th
Tanya	8	Riyan	Eliminated; 3rd March 2024	30th

=== Wild-Cards ===
Name	Age	Paired with	Status	Place
Chainveer	24	Chirashree	Runner-up; 25 May 2024	3rd
Chirashree	20	Chainveer	Runner-up; 25 May 2024	3rd
Tarun	35	Tokjir	Eliminated; 5 May 2024	19th
Tokjir	7	Tarun	Eliminated; 5 May 2024	19th
Chobbi	72	none	Eliminated; 7 April 2024	25th

== Summary ==
contestants performed in pairs or trios.

Week(s) -	Place	1	2	3	4	5	6	7	8	9	10	11	12	13	14	15
Episodes -	Place	5-6	7-8	9-10	11-12	13-14	15-16	17-18	19-20	21-22	23-24	25-26	27-28	29-30	31-32	33
Gaurav & Nitin	1st	PLAY	PLAY	PLAY	PLAY	PLAY	PLAY	PLAY	PLAY	PLAY	PLAY	PLAY	PLAY	PLAY	TTF	ULTIMATE WINNER
Chirashree & Chainveer	2nd					WILD-CARD	PLAY	PLAY	PLAY	PLAY	PLAY	PLAY	PLAY	PLAY	TTF	FINALIST
Divansh & Harsha	2nd	PLAY	PLAY	PLAY	PLAY	PLAY	PLAY	PLAY	PLAY	PLAY	PLAY	PLAY	PLAY	PLAY	TTF	FINALIST
Kashvi & Taranjot	2nd	PLAY	PLAY	PLAY	PLAY	PLAY	PLAY	PLAY	PLAY	PLAY	PLAY	PLAY	PLAY	PLAY	TTF	FINALIST
Shrirang & Varsha	2nd	PLAY	PLAY	PLAY	PLAY	PLAY	PLAY	PLAY	PLAY	PLAY	PLAY	PLAY	PLAY	PLAY	TTF	FINALIST
Yuvraj & Yuvansh	2nd	PLAY	PLAY	PLAY	PLAY	PLAY	PLAY	PLAY	PLAY	PLAY	PLAY	PLAY	PLAY	PLAY	TTF	FINALIST
Deepanita	7th	PLAY	-	-	-	PLAY	PLAY	PLAY	PLAY	PLAY	PLAY	PLAY	PLAY	PLAY	REWIND	
Isha & Siddharth	7th	PLAY	PLAY	PLAY	PLAY	-	-	-	PLAY	PLAY	PLAY	PLAY	PLAY	PLAY	REWIND	
Sargam & Mukesh	7th	PLAY	PLAY	PLAY	PLAY	PLAY	PLAY	PLAY	PLAY	PLAY	PLAY	PLAY	PLAY	PLAY	REWIND	
Anjali & Sharvari	10th	PLAY	PLAY	PLAY	PLAY	PLAY	PLAY	PLAY	PLAY	PLAY	PLAY	PLAY	PLAY	REWIND		
Tokjir & Tarun	11th					WILD-CARD	PLAY	PLAY	PLAY	PLAY	PLAY	PLAY	REWIND			
Rohit & Roshan	12th	PLAY	PLAY	PLAY	PLAY	PLAY	PLAY	PLAY	PLAY	PLAY	PLAY	REWIND				
Bina, Manjula & Shashi	13th	PLAY	PLAY	PLAY	PLAY	PLAY	PLAY	PLAY	PLAY	REWIND						
Chobbi	14th					WILD-CARD	PLAY	PLAY	REWIND							
Ashik & Anwesha	15th	PLAY	PLAY	PLAY	REWIND											
Bishal & Sandeep	15th	PLAY	PLAY	PLAY	REWIND											
Sunil	17th	PLAY	PLAY	REWIND												
Riyan & Tanya	17th	PLAY	PLAY	REWIND												

The contestant is from 1st Generation.
The contestant is from 2nd Generation.
The contestant is from 3rd Generation.

The contestant was the Ultimate Winner.
The contestant was the Winner of their Generation.
The contestants were Finalists & eliminated during the final.
The contestant received 2 Plays & moved on to next round.
The contestant received Ticket to Finale & moved on to the final.
The contestant was safe.
The contestant was got 0 Plays, but moved on to next round.
The contestant was in the bottom.
The contestant received Rewind & was Eliminated by Public Vote.
The contestant didn't perform that week.
The contestant was injured and had to leave the competition.

== Guest appearances ==
Sr.	Guest(s)	Reason	Date	Episode(s)
1	Deepika Singh and Sanika	To promote their show Mangal Lakshmi	18 February	Ep 6
2	Ankita Lokhande, Vicky Jain, Sunny Arya, Arun Mashettey, Isha Malviya, Samarth Jurel, Abhishek Kumar, Mannara Chopra, Munawar Faruqui, Aishwarya Sharma and Neil Bhatt	Guest appearance	24 & 25 February	Ep 7 & 8
3	Bhagyashree	Filmy Night	2 & 3 March	Ep 9 & 10
4	Govinda and Sunita Ahuja	Holi Special	23 & 24 March	Ep 15 & 16
5	Amit Kumar	Kishore Kumar Tribute Special	6 & 7 April	Ep 19 & 20
6	Aayush Sharma and Sushrii Shreya Mishraa	To promote their film Ruslaan	14 April	Ep 22
7	Sukhwinder Singh	Special appearance	20 & 21 April	Ep 23 & 24
8	Karishma Kapoor	Special appearance	27 & 28 April	Ep 25 & 26
9	Rajkummar Rao and Alaya F	To promote their film Srikanth	28 April	Ep 26
10	Arjun Bijlani and Karan Kundrra	To promote their show Laughter Chefs Unlimited Entertainment	4 May	Ep 27
11	Ankita Lokhande	Special dance performance	11 May	Ep 29
12	Shriram Madhav Nene	Madhuri Dixit's husband for Special appearance	12 May	Ep 30
13	Rupa Dixit Dandekar, Arin Nene and Ryan Nene	Madhuri Dixit's sister & Madhuri Dixit's sons for Special video message	12 May	Ep 30
14	Chef Harpal Singh Sokhi	To promote his show Laughter Chefs Unlimited Entertainment	12 May	Ep 30
15	Urmila Matondkar	Special appearance	18 & 19 May	Ep 31 & 32
16	Aly Goni	To promote their show Laughter Chefs Unlimited Entertainment	18 May	Ep 31
17	Jannat Zubair Rahmani & Reem Shaikh	To promote their show Laughter Chefs Unlimited Entertainment	19 May	Ep 32
18	Kartik Aaryan	To promote his film Chandu Champion	25 May	Ep 33
19	Krushna Abhishek, Sudesh Lehri & Kashmera Shah	To promote their show Laughter Chefs Unlimited Entertainment	25 May	Ep 33
