= Dance Deewane season 3 =

Dance Deewane
- Season 3
- Hosted by: Raghav Juyal; Haarsh Limbachiyaa; Bharti Singh
- Judges: Madhuri Dixit; Tushar Kalia; Dharmesh Yelande
- No. of contestants: 18
- Winners: Piyush Gurbhele & Rupesh Soni
- No. of episodes: 66

Release
- Original network: Colors TV
- Original release: 27 February – 10 October 2021

Season chronology
- ← Previous; Season 2 Next → Season 4

Dance Deewane 3 is the third season of the Indian dance reality television series Dance Deewane. It premiered on 27 February 2021 on Colors TV. The winner was Piyush Gurbhele.

== Production ==
Season 3 was initially scheduled to start in February 2020, but has been indefinitely postponed due to the COVID-19 pandemic in India. On 20 January 2021 a promo was released on Colors TV official Instagram. The show is hosted and presented by slow motion king Raghav Juyal. After he quits, the show was hosted by Haarsh Limbachiyaa and Bharti Singh.

== Judges ==
The following are the judges of this season..

=== Main Judges ===
- Madhuri Dixit
- Tushar Kalia
- Dharmesh Yelande

=== Guest Judge and Hosts ===
- Punit Pathak (in place of Dharmesh in week 2, 3, and 4)
- Nora Fatehi (in place of Madhuri in week 4, 5, 6, 19, 20, 21 and 22)
- Haarsh Limbachiyaa and Bharti Singh (In week 4, 5, 6, 7, 8 and Continued when Raghav Juyal Quit)

== Contestants ==
=== Top 18 Contestants ===
2 Wild-card contestants and 2 Re-entrant Contestants entered in week 14.

Name	Place	Choreographer	Status	Position
Piyush Gurbhele	Nagpur	Rupesh Soni	Ultimate Winner; 10 October 2021	1st
Gunjan Sinha	Guwahati	Sagar Bora	Runners-up; 10 October 2021	2nd
Aman Kumar Raj	Ranchi	Yogesh Sharma	Runners-up; 10 October 2021	2nd
Somansh Dangwal	Uttrakhand	Akash Thapa	Runners-up; 10 October 2021	2nd
Sohail Khan	Aligarh	Vishal Sonkar	Runners-up; 10 October 2021	2nd
Soochana Chorge	Mumbai	Vaishnavi Patil	Runners-up; 10 October 2021	2nd
Antara and Papai	Barasat	Tarun Nihlani	Eliminated; 3 October 2021	7th
Arundhati Garnaik	Mumbai	Kishan Bilagali	Eliminated; 3 October 2021	7th
Pallavi Tolye	Mumbai	Kumar Sharma	Eliminated; 3 October 2021	7th
Sahil and Anjali	Delhi	Paul Marshall	Eliminated; 4 July 2021	11th
Uday Singh	Neemuch		Eliminated; 13 June 2021	13th
Jamna Dathiya	Mumbai		Eliminated; 13 June 2021	13th
Presha Shah	Ahmedabad		Eliminated; 9 May 2021	15th
Panvelkars	Panvel		Eliminated; 9 May 2021	15th
Yogesh Asabvale	Mumbai		Eliminated; 9 May 2021	15th
Ajay and Shilpa Phalke	Kolhapur		Withdrew; 9 May 2021	15th

: Re-entrant

=== Wild-Cards ===
Name	Choreographer	Place	Status	Position
Saddam Sheikh	Rupesh Bane	Mumbai	Withdrew; 3 October 2021	7th
Creative Dance Crew		Mumbai	Eliminated; 28 June 2021	11th

== Summary ==
Week(s) -	Place	1-7	2	3	4	5	6	7	8	9	10	11	12	13	14	15	16	17	18	19	20	21	22	23	24	25	26	27	28	29	30	
Episodes -	Place	7-8	9-10	11-12	13-14	15-16	17-18	19-20	21-22	23-24	25-26	27-28	29-30	31-32	33-34	35-36	37-38	39-40	41-42	43-44	45-46	47-48	49-50	51-52	53-54	55-56	57-58	59-60	61-62	63-64	65	66
Piyush & Rupesh S.	1st	PLAY	PLAY	PLAY	PLAY	PLAY	PLAY	PLAY	PLAY	PLAY	PLAY	PLAY	PLAY	PLAY	PLAY	PLAY	PLAY	PLAY	PLAY	PLAY	PLAY	PLAY	PLAY	PLAY	PLAY	PLAY	PLAY	PLAY	PLAY	PLAY	TTF	ULTIMATE WINNER
Gunjan & Sagar	2nd	PLAY	PLAY	PLAY	PLAY	PLAY	PLAY	PLAY	PLAY	PLAY	PLAY	PLAY	PLAY	PLAY	PLAY	PLAY	PLAY	PLAY	PLAY	PLAY	PLAY	PLAY	PLAY	PLAY	PLAY	PLAY	PLAY	PLAY	PLAY	PLAY	TTF	FINALIST
Aman & Yogesh	2nd	PLAY	PLAY	PLAY	PLAY	PLAY	PLAY	PLAY	PLAY	PLAY	PLAY	PLAY	PLAY	PLAY	PLAY	PLAY	PLAY	PLAY	PLAY	PLAY	PLAY	PLAY	PLAY	PLAY	PLAY	PLAY	PLAY	PLAY	PLAY	PLAY	TTF	FINALIST
Somaansh & Akash	2nd	PLAY	PLAY	PLAY	PLAY	PLAY	PLAY	PLAY	PLAY	PLAY	REWIND				WILD-CARD	PLAY	PLAY	PLAY	PLAY	PLAY	PLAY	PLAY	PLAY	PLAY	PLAY	PLAY	PLAY	PLAY	PLAY	PLAY	TTF	FINALIST
Sohail & Vishal	2nd	PLAY	PLAY	PLAY	PLAY	PLAY	PLAY	PLAY	PLAY	PLAY	PLAY	PLAY	PLAY	PLAY	PLAY	PLAY	PLAY	PLAY	PLAY	PLAY	PLAY	PLAY	PLAY	PLAY	PLAY	PLAY	PLAY	PLAY	PLAY	PLAY	TTF	FINALIST
Soochana & Vaishnavi	2nd	PLAY	PLAY	PLAY	PLAY	PLAY	PLAY	PLAY	PLAY	PLAY	PLAY	PLAY	PLAY	PLAY	PLAY	PLAY	PLAY	PLAY	PLAY	PLAY	PLAY	PLAY	PLAY	PLAY	PLAY	PLAY	PLAY	PLAY	PLAY	PLAY	TTF	FINALIST
Papai and Antara & Tarun	7th	PLAY	PLAY	PLAY	PLAY	PLAY	PLAY	PLAY	PLAY	PLAY	REWIND				WILD-CARD	PLAY	PLAY	PLAY	PLAY	PLAY	PLAY	PLAY	PLAY	PLAY	PLAY	PLAY	PLAY	PLAY	PLAY	PLAY	REWIND	
Arundhati & Kishan	7th	PLAY	PLAY	PLAY	PLAY	PLAY	PLAY	PLAY	PLAY	PLAY	PLAY	PLAY	PLAY	PLAY	PLAY	PLAY	PLAY	PLAY	PLAY	PLAY	PLAY	PLAY	PLAY	PLAY	PLAY	PLAY	PLAY	PLAY	PLAY	PLAY	REWIND	
Pallavi & Kumar	7th	PLAY	PLAY	PLAY	PLAY	PLAY	PLAY	PLAY	PLAY	PLAY	PLAY	PLAY	PLAY	PLAY	PLAY	PLAY	PLAY	PLAY	PLAY	PLAY	PLAY	PLAY	PLAY	PLAY	PLAY	PLAY	PLAY	PLAY	PLAY	PLAY	REWIND	
Saddam & Rupesh B.	7th														WILD-CARD	PLAY	PLAY	PLAY	PLAY	PLAY	PLAY	PLAY	PLAY	PLAY	PLAY	PLAY	PLAY	PLAY	PLAY	PLAY	INJU	
Sahil and Anjali & Paul	11th	PLAY	PLAY	PLAY	PLAY	PLAY	PLAY	PLAY	PLAY	PLAY	PLAY	PLAY	PLAY	PLAY	PLAY	PLAY	PLAY	REWIND														
Creative Dance; Crew	12th														WILD-CARD	PLAY	REWIND															
Uday	13th	PLAY	PLAY	PLAY	PLAY	PLAY	PLAY	PLAY	PLAY	PLAY	PLAY	PLAY	PLAY	PLAY	REWIND																	
Jamna	13th	PLAY	PLAY	PLAY	PLAY	PLAY	PLAY	PLAY	PLAY	PLAY	PLAY	PLAY	PLAY	PLAY	REWIND																	
Ajay and Shilpa	15th	PLAY	PLAY	PLAY	PLAY	PLAY	PLAY	PLAY	SAFE	PLAY	QUIT																					
Presha	16th	PLAY	PLAY	PLAY	PLAY	PLAY	PLAY	PLAY	REWIND																							
Panvelkars	16th	PLAY	PLAY	PLAY	PLAY	PLAY	PLAY	PLAY	REWIND																							
Yogesh	16th	PLAY	PLAY	PLAY	PLAY	PLAY	PLAY	PLAY	REWIND																							

The contestant is from 1st Generation.
The contestant is from 2nd Generation.
The contestant is from 3rd Generation.

The contestant was the Ultimate Winner.
The contestant was the Winner of their Generation.
The contestants were Finalists & eliminated during the final.
The contestant received all 3 Plays & moved on to next round.
The contestant received 2 Plays & moved on to next round.
The contestant was safe.
The contestant was got only 1 Play.
The contestant was in the bottom.
The contestant received Rewind & was Eliminated.
The contestant was injured and had to leave the competition.

== Guests ==
Sr.	Guest(s)	Reason	Episode
1	Bharti Singh and Haarsh Limbachiyaa	Special appearance	13–14 March
2	Janhvi Kapoor and Varun Sharma	To promote their film Roohi	14 March
3	Remo D'Souza	Special appearance	20–21 March
4	Parineeti Chopra	To promote her film Saina	21 March
5	Waheeda Rehman, Asha Parekh, Helen, Ranjeet and Prem Chopra	Holi Special	27 March
6	Sanya Malhotra	To promote her film Pagglait	27 March
7	Udit Narayan, Anu Malik, Bharti Singh and Haarsh Limbachiyaa	Dosti Special	3–4 April
8	Shakti Mohan	Pol Khol Special	10 April
9	Shatrughan Sinha and Dharmendra	Pol Khol Special	11 April
10	Nora Fatehi	Fan Special	17–18 April
10	Nora Fatehi	Special Appearance	24-25 April
11	Sonu Sood	Hope Special	1–2 May
12	All-contestants Mother	Mother's Day Special	8–9 May
13	Sidharth Shukla	To promote Broken But Beautiful 3	12–13 June
14	Javed Jaffrey and Naved Jaffrey	To introduce wild card contestants	19–20 June
15	Raveena Tandon	Monsoon Special	26 June
16	Subhash Ghai	Special Appearance	27 June
17	Jackie Shroff and Sunil Shetty	Yaadein Special	3–4 July
18	Anil Kapoor	To fulfill contestants wishes	10 July
19	Farhan Akhtar and Mrunal Thakur	To promote their film Toofan	10 July
20	Shagufta Ali	Special appearance	11 July
21	Rohit Shetty	To promote Khatron Ke Khiladi 11	11 July
22	Rekha	Eid al-Adha Special	17–18 July
23	Nora Fatehi and Ganesh Acharya	Guru Purnima	24 July
24	Govinda	Guru Purnima	25 July
25	Javed Akhtar	Celebrating 100 years of Indian cinema	31 July – 1 August
26	Kriti Sanon	To promote her film Mimi	1 August
27	Daler Mehandi, Mika Singh, Badshah & B Praak	Bachpan Special	7–8 August
28	Kapil Dev, Mohinder Amarnath	Independence Day Special	14 August
29	Priya Malik, Mirabai Chanu, Bhavani Devi	Independence Day Special	15 August
30	Kings United	Special performance Independence Day Special	15 August
31	Sidharth Shukla, Shehnaaz Kaur Gill	Love Special	21–22 August
32	Alka Yagnik, Kumar Sanu	90s Special	28–29 August
33	Urmila Matondkar	Special appearance	4–5 September
34	Jacqueline Fernandez, Yami Gautam	To promote their film Bhoot Police	11–12 September
35	Rohit Shetty, Rahul Vaidya, Arjun Bijlani, Divyanka Tripathi, Shweta Tiwari and Vishal Aditya Singh	Mahasangam with Khatron Ke Khiladi 11 Contestants	18–19 September
36	Neha Kakkar, Tony Kakkar & Yo Yo Honey Singh	To Promote Kaanta Laga	19 September
37	Radhika Madan, Sunny Kaushal	To Promote Shiddat	25 September
38	Mouni Roy, Jubin Nautiyal	To Promote Dil Galti Kar Baitha Hai	26 September
39	Sonakshi Sinha, Raashi Sood	To Promote "Mil Mahiya"	2 October
40	Amaal Mallik, Jasmin Bhasin	To Promote "Pyaar Ek Tarfaa"	3 October
41	Bappi Lahiri, Raftaar, Ikka Singh, Anil Kapoor	Special Appearance	9 October
42	Mithun Chakraborty	To Promote "Hunarbaaz Desh Ki Shaan"	10 October

=== Through video conferencing ===
Sr.	Guest(s)	Reason	Episode
1	Amitabh Bachchan	For motivating contestants	13 June
2	Rubina Dilaik	For motivating contestant Pallavi Tolye	19 June
2	Tiger Shroff	To support Sohail	3 July
