= Dance Deewane season 1 =

Dance Deewane
- Season 1
- Hosted by: Arjun Bijlani
- Judges: Madhuri Dixit; Tushar Kalia; Shashank Khaitan
- No. of contestants: 17
- Winners: Alok Shaw (Ultimate); Kishan Bilagali (Generation 2); Dinanath Singh (Generation 3)
- No. of episodes: 32

Release
- Original network: Colors TV
- Original release: 2 June – 15 September 2018

Season chronology
- Next → Season 2

Dance Deewane 1 is the first season of the Indian dance reality television series Dance Deewane that premiered on 2 June 2018 on Colors TV. This season was hosted by Arjun Bijlani. The season was won by Alok Shaw.

== Judges ==
The following are the three judges of the season:

- Madhuri Dixit
- Tushar Kalia
- Shashank Khaitan

== Contestants ==
Top 20 contestants were chosen, 6 from 1st and 3rd generation and 8 from 2nd generation. 3 Wild Cards and 3 re-entrants entered the competition in Week 5.

- 1st Generation: Kids
- 2nd Generation: Youth
- 3rd Generation: Seniors

Name	Status	Place
Alok Shaw	Ultimate Winner; Episode 30	1st
Kishan Bilagali	2nd Generation Winner; Episode 30	2nd
Dinanath Singh	3rd Generation Winner; Episode 10	2nd
Prabhadeep Singh	Runners-up; Episode 30	4th
Siza Roy	Runners-up; Episode 30	4th
Sonali Nirantar	Runners-up; Episode 30	4th
Ved Prakash Allah	Runners-up; Episode 30	4th
Karan Pariyar	Eliminated; Episode 28	8th
Aadvik Mongia	Eliminated; Episode 28	8th
Firoz Khan	Eliminated; Episode 27	10th
Shweta Sharda	Eliminated; Episode 27	10th
Mansi Dhruv	Eliminated; Episode 27	10th
Shaurya Jain	Eliminated; Episode 23	11th
Manisha Singh	Eliminated; Episode 23	11th
Minal Dhapare	Eliminated; Episode 23	11th
Palakh Dilip More	Eliminated; Episode 21	13th
Shakil Sheikh	Withdrew; Episode 19	14th
Neeraj Yadav	Eliminated; Episode 12	15th
Siddhant Sharma	Eliminated; Episode 10	16th
Lalita Soni	Eliminated; Episode 10	16th

=== Challengers ===
Name	Status	Place
Jyothi Ranjan Sahu	Runner-up; Episode 30	4th
Sandeep Gupta	Eliminated; Episode 23	11th
Bittu Singh	Eliminated; Episode 23	11th

Quit
Eliminated
Generation 1
Generation 2
Generation 3
Re-entrant

== Summary ==
Week –	1	2	3	4	5	6	7	8	9	10	11	12		13
Episode -	7–8	9–10	11–12	13–14	15–16	17	18–19	20–21	22–23	24–25	26–27	28	29	30
Alok	SAFE	SAFE	SAFE	SAFE	SAFE	SAFE	SAFE	SAFE	BTM	SAFE	SAFE	SAFE	Ultimate Winner	
Kishan	SAFE	SAFE	SAFE	BTM	SAFE	SAFE	SAFE	SAFE	SAFE	SAFE	SAFE	SAFE	2nd Generation Winner	
Dinanath	SAFE	BTM	SAFE	BTM	SAFE	SAFE	SAFE	SAFE	BTM	SAFE	SAFE	SAFE	3rd Generation Winner	
Jyothi	Not in Competition				Wild-Card	SAFE	SAFE	SAFE	SAFE	SAFE	SAFE	SAFE	FINALIST	
Prabhadeep	SAFE	SAFE	BTM	SAFE	SAFE	SAFE	SAFE	BTM	SAFE	SAFE	BTM	SAFE	FINALIST	
Siza	SAFE	SAFE	SAFE	SAFE	SAFE	SAFE	SAFE	SAFE	BTM	SAFE	SAFE	SAFE	FINALIST	
Sonali	SAFE	BTM	BTM	BTM	SAFE	SAFE	SAFE	SAFE	SAFE	SAFE	BTM	SAFE	FINALIST	
Ved	SAFE	BTM	BTM	SAFE	SAFE	SAFE	SAFE	BTM	SAFE	SAFE	SAFE	SAFE	FINALIST	
Karan	SAFE	BTM	SAFE	SAFE	SAFE	SAFE	SAFE	SAFE	SAFE	SAFE	SAFE	ELIM		
Aadvik	SAFE	SAFE	BTM	SAFE	SAFE	SAFE	SAFE	BTM	SAFE	SAFE	BTM	ELIM		
Feroz	SAFE	SAFE	BTM	SAFE	SAFE	SAFE	SAFE	SAFE	SAFE	SAFE	ELIM			
Mansi	SAFE	BTM	ELIM		Wild-Card	SAFE	SAFE	SAFE	SAFE	SAFE	ELIM			
Shweta	SAFE	ELIM			Wild-Card	SAFE	SAFE	SAFE	SAFE	SAFE	ELIM			
Shaurya	SAFE	SAFE	SAFE	SAFE	SAFE	SAFE	SAFE	SAFE	ELIM					
Minal	SAFE	SAFE	ELIM		Wild-Card	SAFE	SAFE	SAFE	ELIM					
Manisha	SAFE	BTM	SAFE	BTM	SAFE	SAFE	SAFE	SAFE	ELIM					
Palakh	SAFE	SAFE	SAFE	BTM	SAFE	SAFE	SAFE	ELIM						
Sandeep	Not in Competition				Wild-Card	SAFE	SAFE	ELIM						
Bittu	Not in Competition				Wild-Card	SAFE	SAFE	ELIM						
Shakil	SAFE	BTM	SAFE	SAFE	SAFE	SAFE	INJU							
Neeraj	SAFE	BTM	ELIM											
Siddhant	SAFE	ELIM												
Lalita	SAFE	ELIM												

The contestant is from 1st Generation.
The contestant is from 2nd Generation.
The contestant is from 3rd Generation.

The contestant was the Ultimate Winner.
The contestant was the Winner of their Generation.
The contestants were Finalists and eliminated during the final.
The contestant was safe by getting all 3 Plays.
The contestant was saved by getting 2 Plays.
The contestant was got only 1 Play and was in bottom.
The contestant was in the bottom.
The contestant was Eliminated.
The contestant was injured and had to leave the competition.

== Guests ==
Episode	Guest(s)						Note
1–2	Salman Khan			Jacqueline Fernandez			To promote the film Race 3
3–4	Salman Khan	Jacqueline Fernandez	Anil Kapoor	Bobby Deol	Daisy Shah	Saqib Saleem	To promote the film Race 3
5–6	Bharti Singh						Comedian Guest
7–8	Govinda						Guest Appearance
9–10	Raghav Juyal		Punit Pathak		Dharmesh Yelande		To promote the film Nawabzaade
11–12	Diljit Dosanjh						To promote the film Soorma
13–14	Janhvi Kapoor		Ishaan Khatter		Karan Johar		To promote the film Dhadak
17	Raveena Tandon						Guest Appearance
20–21	Akshay Kumar			Mouni Roy			To promote the film Gold
22	Sonakshi Sinha			Diana Penty			To promote the film Happy Phirr Bhag Jayegi
23	John Abraham						To promote the film Satyameva Jayate
24	Shraddha Kapoor			Rajkumar Rao			To promote the film Stree
27	Kajol						To promote the film Helicopter Eela
28	Abhishek Bachchan		Vicky Kaushal		Taapsee Pannu		To promote the film Manmarziyaan
29	Drashti Dhami		Vivian Dsena	Harshad Chopda	Jennifer Winget	Surbhi Jyoti	Guest Appearance
30-Final	Varun Dhawan			Anushka Sharma			To promote the film Sui Dhaaga
