= Dance Deewane =

Indian Dance Reality show

- Genre: Dance Reality
- Creative director: Arvind Rao
- Presented by: Arjun Bijlani (season 1–2); Raghav Juyal (season 3); Haarsh Limbachiyaa (season 3); Bharti Singh (Season 3-present); Karan Kundrra (Season Jr.)
- Judges: Madhuri Dixit (season 1–present); Tushar Kalia (season 1–3); Shashank Khaitan (season 1–2); Dharmesh Yelande (season 3); Marzi Pestonji (season Jr.); Neetu Singh (season Jr.); Nora Fatehi (season Jr.); Suniel Shetty (season 4–present)
- Country of origin: India
- Original language: Hindi
- No. of seasons: 4
- No. of episodes: 130

Production
- Camera setup: Multi-camera
- Running time: 90 minutes (season 1&2); 120 minutes (season 3); 100 minutes (season 4); including commercials
- Production company: Dreams Vault Media

Original release
- Network: Colors TV
- Release: 2 June 2018 – present

Dance Deewane (transl. Dance Lovers) is an Indian dance reality show that airs on Colors TV. The show features dance performers, including solo acts, duo and groups representing any style of dance, competing for a grand prize.

The series premiered on Colors TV on 2 June 2018. Dance Deewane (Season 1) aired from 2 June 2018 to 15 September 2018, Dance Deewane (Season 2) aired from 15 June 2019 to 28 September 2019, Dance Deewane (Season 3) aired from 27 February 2021 to 10 October 2021 and Dance Deewane (Season 4) aired from 3 February 2024 to 26 May 2024. Dance Deewane Juniors, the series' spin-off, aired from 23 April 2022 to 17 July 2022.

== Synopsis ==
Various talented dancers are divided into three age groups, called "generations". The first generation is the youngest while the third generation is the oldest. In the end, the best-performing dancers from each generation compete against each other in the finale. The dancers usually perform alongside choreographers.

== Details ==
=== Dance Deewane ===
Season	Episodes	Original Broadcast	
Season	Episodes	First Aired	Last Aired
1	30	2 June 2018	15 September 2018
2	31	15 June 2019	28 September 2019
3	66	27 February 2021	10 October 2021
4	33	3 February 2024	25 May 2024

=== Dance Deewane Juniors ===
Season	Episodes	Original Broadcast	
Season	Episodes	First Aired	Last Aired
1	24	23 April 2022	17 July 2022

== Judges and hosts ==
Color key

Host
Judge
Guest Judge
Guest host

Season	1	2	3	Jr.	4
Dharmesh Yelande			●		
Madhuri Dixit	●	●	●		●
Marzi Pestonji				●	
Neetu Singh				●	
Nora Fatehi			●	●	
Shashank Khaitan	●	●			
Punit Pathak			●		
Suniel Shetty					●
Tushar Kalia	●	●	●		
Arjun Bijlani	●	●			
Bharti Singh			●		●
Karan Kundrra				●	
Haarsh Limbachiyaa			●		
Raghav Juyal			●		

== Seasons preview ==
Season	Premiere	Finale	No. of contestants	Ultimate winner	First generation winner(s)	Second generation winner	Third generation winner	Winning Generation	Host(s)	Judges		
Season	Premiere	Finale	No. of contestants	Ultimate winner	First generation winner(s)	Second generation winner	Third generation winner	Winning Generation	Host(s)	1	2	3
1	2 June 2018	15 September 2018	23	Alok Shaw	Alok Shaw	Kishan Bilalgali	Dinanath Singh	1st	Arjun Bijlani	Tushar Kalia	Madhuri Dixit	Shashank Khaitan
2	15 June 2019	28 September 2019	28	Vishal Sonkar	Tweesha Patel & Vihaan Trivedi	Vishal Sonkar	Mehul Mehta	2nd	Arjun Bijlani	Tushar Kalia	Madhuri Dixit	Shashank Khaitan
3	27 February 2021	10 October 2021	18	Piyush Gurbhele & Rupesh Soni	—			2nd	~~Raghav Juyal~~	Tushar Kalia	Madhuri Dixit	Dharmesh Yelande
3	27 February 2021	10 October 2021	18	Piyush Gurbhele & Rupesh Soni	—			2nd	Bharti Singh & Haarsh Limbachiyaa	Tushar Kalia	Madhuri Dixit	Dharmesh Yelande
4	3 February 2024	25 May 2024	32	Gaurav Sharma & Nitin NJ	—			2nd	Bharti Singh	Suniel Shetty	Madhuri Dixit	—

Spin-off	Premiere	Finale	No. of contestants	Winner	Winning Gangleader	Host	Gangleader			Judges		
Jr^{1}	23 April 2022	17 July 2022	15	Aditya Patil	Pratik Utekar	Karan Kundrra	Tushar Shetty	Pratik Utekar	Sonali Kar	Marzi Pestonji	Neetu Singh	Nora Fatehi

== Contestants ==
=== Dance Deewane ===
Season	Season 1			Season 2			Season 3			Season 4		
Generation	1st	2nd	3rd	1st	2nd	3rd	1st	2nd	3rd	1st	3rd	2nd
Participants	Alok Shaw 🏆	Kishan Bilagali	Dinanath Singh	Tweesha Patel	Vishal Sonkar🏆	Mehul Mehta	Gunjan Sinha	Piyush Gurbhele🏆	Soochna Ghirge	Deepanita	Varsha	Anjali
Participants	Aadvik Mongia	Prabhadeep Singh	Sonali Nirantar	Vihan Trivedi	Paramdeep Singh	Sneha Adapawar	Somaansh Dangwal	Antara and Papai	Pallavi Tolye	Divansh	Shrirang	Gaurav
Participants	Shaurya Jain	Siza Roy	Ved Prakash Allah	Om Shubham Mahapatra	Kalpita Kachroo	Soumya Shree	Aman Kumar Raj	Arundhati Garnaik	Jamna Dathiya	Kashvi	Bina	Charanvir & Chirashree
Participants	Palakh Dilip More	Karan Pariyar	Firoz Khan	Neerja Tiwari	Tushar Kaushik	Raghu G	Sohail Khan	Saddam Shaikh	Ajay and Shilpa Phalke	Yuvraj	Chobbi	Isha
Participants	Siddhant Sharma	Manisha Singh	Lalita Soni	Muhammad Arsh Ali	Shaina Lebana	Rupesh Raj	Presha Shah	Sahil and Anjali	Yogesh Asabvale	Sargam & Mukesh		Harsha
Participants		Shakil Sheikh		Aneesh Roy	Javed Chaudhari	Juliana Mehta		Creative Dance Crew		Yuvansh	Manjula	Nitin
Participants		Neeraj Yadav		Urva Bhavsar	Kanchi Shah	Gopal Patro		Uday Singh		Riyan	Shashi	Siddharth
Participants				Pratiti Dass	Padmini Patnaik			Panvelkars		Tanya		Rohit & Roshan
Participants												Taranjot
Participants												Ashik
Participants												Anwesha
Participants												Bishal
Participants												Sandeep
Participants												Sunil

=== Dance Deewane Juniors ===
Season	Season 1		
Gangs	Gang Sonali	Gang Pratik	Gang Tushar
Participants	Geet Kaur Bagga	Aditya Patil🏆	All Stars
Participants	MD. Raish	Pratik Kumar Naik	Riddhi Sadhrani
Participants	Priyanshi Kunarji	C Company	Anshika Dhara
Participants	Classical Queen	Ops Crew	Falak Saifi
Participants	Runjuna Das	Arnav Talukdar	Yash & Aradhya

Notes:

Eliminated
Quit
Finalist
1st Generation Winner
2nd Generation Winner
3rd Generation Winner
🏆 Ultimate Winner
