= Khatron Ke Khiladi 12 =

Indian reality and stunt television series

Fear Factor: Khatron Ke Khiladi
- Season 12
- Title screen
- Native name: Bach Ke Kahan Jayega? Khatra Kahin Se Bhi Aayega!
- Starring: See Below
- Presented by: Rohit Shetty
- No. of contestants: 14
- Winner: Tushar Kalia
- Runner-up: Faisal Shaikh
- No. of episodes: 26 (list of episodes)

Release
- Original network: Colors TV
- Original release: 2 July – 25 September 2022

Season chronology
- ← Previous; Season 11 Next → Season 13

Fear Factor: Khatron Ke Khiladi, Bach Ke Kahan Jayega? Khatra Kahin Se Bhi Aayega! is the twelfth season of Fear Factor: Khatron Ke Khiladi, an Indian reality and stunt television series produced by Endemol Shine India. The show premiered from 2 July to 25 September 2022, on Colors TV and digitally streams on Voot. Filmed in Cape Town, South Africa, the 26-episode season was hosted by Rohit Shetty. Tushar Kalia emerged as the winner of this season while Faisal Shaikh became the 1st runner-up.

== Contestants ==
Contestants of Fear Factor: Khatron Ke Khiladi 12

Contestant	Occupation	Status	Place	Ref.
Tushar Kalia	Choreographer	Winner (Week 13)	1st	
Faisal Shaikh	Social Media Influencer	Eliminated (Week 9)	2nd	
Faisal Shaikh	Social Media Influencer	1st runner-up (Week 13)	2nd	
Mohit Malik	Actor	2nd runner-up (Week 13)	3rd	
Rubina Dilaik	Actress	3rd runner-up (Week 13)	4th	
Jannat Zubair Rahmani	Actress	4th Runner-Up (Week 13)	5th	
Kanika Mann	Actress	Finalist (Week 13)	6th	
Rajiv Adatia	Model	Eliminated (Week 12)	7th	
Nishant Bhat	Choreographer	Eliminated (Week 12)	8th	
Pratik Sehajpal	Reality Show Alumnus	Eliminated (Week 5)	9th	
Pratik Sehajpal	Reality Show Alumnus	Eliminated (Week 10)	9th	
Sriti Jha	Actress	Eliminated (Week 8)	10th	
Chetna Pande	Model and Actress	Eliminated (Week 6)	11th	
Shivangi Joshi	Actress	Eliminated (Week 4)	12th	
Aneri Vajani	Actress	Eliminated (Week 3 )	13th	
Erika Packard	Model	Eliminated (Week 1)	14th	

Indicates original entrants
Indicates re-entered entrants

== Elimination chart ==
	Weeks																																																																	
	1			2			3			4				5												6										7				8				9			10							11					12			13				
	Grand Premiere (Head on Week)			Rohit Shetty vs Khiladis			Atyachaar Week^{2}			Partner Week^{4}				Relay Week												Team Week^{7} ^{8}										K Medal Race				Mummy Special Week				Blockbuster Week			Fear Fanda Week^{14}							Race to Ticket to Finale					Semi Finale Week			GRAND FINALE WEEK				
	2-3 July			9-10 July			16-17 July			23-24 July				30-31 July												6 August					7 August					13–14 August				20-21 August				27-28 August			3 September			4 September				10 Sep		11 September			17-18 September			24 Sept		25 September		
Tushar	LOST	SAFE		WIN	N/A		WIN			NISHANT	WIN			N/A		LOST	CHETNA	N/A					TEAM WIN			10	CPT.^{9}	N/A		0	10	N/A	TIE (30 Points)	SAFE^{10}		WIN	FAIL			WIN				WIN			LOST	WIN	SAFE					WIN		WIN	WIN	Ticket to Finale				WIN		WIN	WIN	Winner
Faisal	WIN			WIN	N/A		BTM3^{3}		SAFE	SHIVANGI	LOST	SAFE^{5}		N/A				WIN	JANNAT	N/A			TEAM LOST	SAFE		0	N/A	10	N/A	10	0	N/A	TIE (30 Points)	SAVED BY CPT.		FAIL	REMOVED BY NISHANT^{11}			WIN				LOST	BTM2	ELIMINATED								WIN		WIN	WIN	FAIL	WIN	Finalist		WIN		WIN	LOST	1st Runner-Up
Mohit	LOST	SAFE		FAIL	N/A		WIN			SRITI	WIN			N/A		WIN	FAISAL	N/A					TEAM LOST	SAFE		0	CPT.^{9}	N/A		10	0	N/A	TIE (30 Points)	SAFE^{10}		WIN	WIN	FAIL		LOST	BTM3	BTM2	SAVED VIA K MEDAL^{13}	LOST	SAFE		LOST	LOST	LOST	WIN	SAFE			FAIL	FAIL	N/A			LOST	SAFE	Finalist	WIN		WIN	LOST	2nd Runner-Up
Jannat	LOST	BTM3	SAFE	FAIL	N/A		WIN			PRATIK	LOST	SAFE^{5}		N/A						LOST	KANIKA		TEAM LOST	BTM3	SAFE	0	N/A	10	0	10	N/A	10	TIE (30 Points)	SAVED BY CPT.		FAIL	REMOVED BY MOHIT^{11}			WIN		BTM2^{13}	SAFE	WIN			LOST	LOST	WIN	SAFE				WIN		WIN^{15}	FAIL^{15}	N/A	WIN	Finalist		BTM 2	SAFE	LOST	ELIMINATED	
Rubina	WIN			FAIL	BTM2^{1}	SAFE	WIN			KANIKA	LOST	SAFE^{5}		LOST	MOHIT	N/A							TEAM LOST	SAFE		0	N/A	HEALTH HAULT				10	TIE (30 Points)	BTM2	SAFE	FAIL	REMOVED BY TUSHAR^{11}			WIN				WIN			LOST	LOST	LOST	LOST	LOST	BTM3	SAFE	HEALTH HAULT		N/A			WIN	Finalist		WIN		LOST	ELIMINATED	
Kanika	WIN			FAIL	N/A		WIN			RUBINA	LOST	BTM3^{5}	SAFE	N/A								LOST	TEAM LOST	BTM3	SAFE	0	N/A	10	N/A	10	0	N/A	TIE (30 Points)	SAVED BY CPT.		FAIL	WIN	WIN	K MEDAL	LOST	SAFE			WIN			LOST	LOST	LOST	LOST	LOST	BTM3	SAFE	WIN		FAIL	N/A		LOST	SAFE	Finalist	BTM 2	ELIMINATED			
Nishant	WIN			FAIL	BTM2^{1}	SAFE	WIN			TUSHAR	WIN			WIN	TUSHAR	N/A							TEAM WIN			0	N/A	0	N/A	0	N/A		TIE (30 Points)	SAVED BY CPT.		WIN	WIN	FAIL		LOST	SAFE			LOST	BTM2	SAFE	WIN	SAFE						FAIL	WIN	WIN	FAIL	N/A	LOST	BTM2	ELIMINATED					
Rajiv	WIN			WIN	N/A		LOST	SAFE		CHETNA	WIN			N/A						WIN	SRITI		TEAM WIN			0	N/A		10	N/A		0	TIE (30 Points)	SAVED BY CPT.		FAIL	FAIL			LOST	BTM3	SAFE^{12}		LOST	SAFE		LOST	LOST	LOST	LOST	WIN	SAFE		WIN		FAIL	N/A		LOST	BTM2	ELIMINATED					
Pratik	WIN			FAIL	N/A		LOST	SAFE		JANNAT	LOST	BTM3^{5}	SAFE	N/A							BTM3^{6}				ELIMINATED											FAIL	REMOVED BY SRITI^{11}			LOST	SAFE			WIN			LOST	LOST	LOST	LOST	LOST	BTM3	ELIMINATED													
Sriti	LOST	SAFE		WIN	N/A		LOST	SAFE		MOHIT	WIN			N/A								WIN	TEAM WIN			0	N/A	0	N/A	0	10	0	TIE (30 Points)	SAVED BY CPT.		WIN	FAIL			LOST	BTM3	BTM2	ELIMINATED																							
Chetna	LOST	SAFE		FAIL	N/A		LOST	SAFE		RAJIV	WIN			N/A				LOST	RAJIV	N/A			TEAM WIN			0	N/A	0	N/A	0	10	N/A	TIE (30 Points)	BTM2	ELIMINATED																															
Shivangi	WIN			FAIL	N/A		LOST	BTM3	SAFE	FAISAL	LOST	BTM3^{5}	ELIMINATED																																																					
Aneri	LOST	BTM3	SAFE	FAIL	N/A		LOST	BTM3	ELIMINATED																																																									
Erika	LOST	BTM3	ELIMINATED																																																															

1. Nishant and Rubina were nominated by co-contestants for the elimination stunt.
2. Contestants were tortured via Pre-Stunts before Stunts.
3. Faisal did not perform the Pre-Stunt as a result he had to directly perform elimination stunt.
4. Pairs during Partner Week.
5. Pairs who lost the first stunt competed against each other to get rid of Fear Funda.
6. Pratik was not chosen as a teammate by any of the two teams so as a result he had to directly perform elimination stunt.
7. Teams continued from Week 5.
8. All contestants performed the Captaincy stunt together.
9. Captain of respective team: Team Red Team Yellow
10. Captains were exempted from performing the Elimination stunt.
11. Winners of the first stunt of K Medal Race were given the exclusive power to remove losers of the first stunt from the race.
12. Faisal proxies Rajiv due to injury.
13. Kanika used K Medal to swap Mohit with Jannat in Elimination stunt.
14. All contestants received Fear Funda performed stunts together.
15. Mohit proxies Jannat due to health issues.

Winner
1st runner-up
2nd runner-up
Finalists
Ticket to Finale
Won/Used K Medal
The contestant won the stunt.
The contestant lost the stunt and received Fear Funda.
The contestant got rid of Fear Funda by winning pre-elimination stunt.
The contestant was placed in the bottom and performed elimination stunt
The contestant was safe from elimination by winning elimination stunt.
The contestant was eliminated
The contestant was exempted from performing the stunt.
The contestant lost the Ticket to Finale Race/K Medal Race/failed to complete the target.
The contestant was removed from the Ticket to Finale/K Medal Race.
Injury
N/A

== Production ==
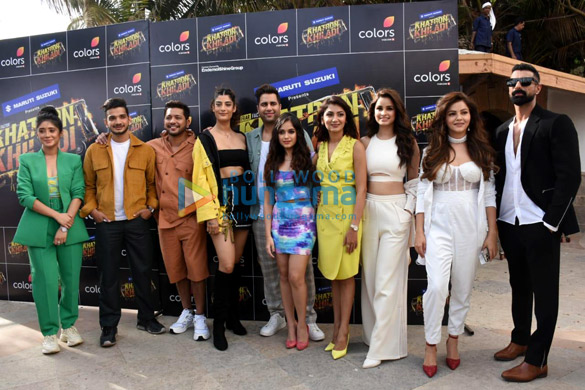
Contestants during Media Interactions

=== Broadcast ===
Apart from the usual weekend episodes, Voot for the first time launched web exclusive's like "Pack-up Ka Punch", "Khiladiyon Ki Journey", "Khiladiyon Ki Fitness Diary", "Khiladiyon Ki Fashion Diary" and "Cape Town Diaries" tracing the contestants' off-screen journey.

=== Casting ===
In May 2022, it was reported that Munawar Faruqui would join the show midway but later backed out due to passport issue.

=== Development ===
The series was announced by Colors TV with a press conference on 25 May 2022. The contestants were spotted at the Chhatrapati Shivaji Maharaj International Airport before leaving for Cape Town, South Africa on 28 May 2022. The contestants were spotted at the Mumbai Airport after returning from Cape Town, South Africa on 18 July 2022.

=== Filming ===
The principal photography of the series began on 6 June 2022 in Cape Town, South Africa. Rohit Shetty took to his Instagram to officially announce the same. Rohit Shetty announced the wrap up of "Khatron Ke Khiladi 12" in Cape Town through an Instagram post on 16 July 2022 in 50 days schedule. The Grand Finale shooting was held on 18 September 2022 in Film City, Mumbai.

=== Release ===
On 6 June 2022, a promo revealing the season's logo and sponsors was released on Colors TV official Instagram and Twitter handles. Subsequently, intro promos of Rubina, Sriti, Tushar, Mohit, Kanika, Shivangi, Jannat and Faisal were released respectively.

== Controversies ==
This season was marked by a series of controversies, including:

- Rubina Dilaik accused Kanika Mann of having searched the internet for the phrases "how to tame an ostrich" and " how to use the feathers of an ostrich" prior to the stunt, and alleged that this had been cheating. Rohit Shetty supported Rubina in this.
- The show landed into controversy when Mohit Malik, Rajiv Adatia and Faisal Shaikh accused that the stunt Rubina Dilaik got was easier than that of Jannat Zubair Rahmani and that is why Rubina deserves to go in elimination. Rohit Shetty defended Rubina by saying that the level of stunts cannot be a determining factor for who should go for the elimination stunt.
- Mohit Malik and Rubina Dilaik had an argument when Rubina revealed her fear of snakes. This agitated Mohit and asked her why she did not reveal it earlier and accused that this was a desperate attempt of trying to be seen, leading Rubina to leave the team.
- Rubina Dilaik and Mohit Malik again get into a tiff when Mohit chooses Rubina for the elimination stunt. Rubina accuses Mohit of choosing her because she didn't chill with anyone post packup. She further said, "no matter how good or bad I perform, I am always chosen for the elimination tasks based on people's disliking towards me." During Mohit and Rubina's fight, Tushar Kalia intervened and said "your team got saved because she won the animal task, Rubina isn't the right choice for the elimination task."
- Kanika Mann and Rubina Dilaik had a verbal spat when Kanika won the K Medal and Rubina accused Kanika of lying about not knowing how to drive. Rubina remarked- "Losing with honestly is much better than winning with dishonesty" which irked the former.
- Kanika Mann and Jannat Zubair had a verbal argument when Kanika chooses Jannat for the elimination stunt using K Medal. The latter says, "It is not about the performance but the equation we share. I have performed well in the task. Your thought of keeping a female against female in the task, that's wrong."
- Rohit Shetty thrashed Kanika Mann when she aborted the stunt in semi-finale week and said that Shivangi Joshi was better than her and she deserved to be in her place. He further added that Kanika neither deserves to be a finalist nor the trophy.

== Stunt Matrix ==
Contestant	Weeks																																								
Contestant	1			2		3						4			5		6							7			8				9			10						11	
Contestant	1			2		Pre-Stunt			Stunt			4			5		Captaincy/Stunt	Stunt						7			8				9			10						11	
Tushar	Height	Height	-	Height	-	Water	Gross Food	-	Shock	-	-	Animal	-	-	Height	-	Height	-	-	Height	Height	-	-	Water	Height	-	Animal	-	-	-	Animal+Height+Vehicle	-	-	Tear Gas	Height	-	-	-	-	Shock	-
Faisal	Water	-	-	Height	-	Water	Gross Food	Animal	-	-	Animal	Shock	Water	-	Water	-	Height	Shock	-	Height	Height	-	-	Water	-	-	Height+Vehicle	-	Height	-	Shock	Height	Ice+Water							Height+Vehicle	-
Mohit	Water	Height	-	Animal	-	Water	Gross Food	-	Shock	-	-	Vehicle	-	-	Height	-	Height	-	-	Height	Height	-	-	Animal+Water	Height	Vehicle	Height+Vehicle	Water	Height	-	Height+Vehicle	Height	-	Tear Gas	Height	Animal+Vehicle	Height+Water	-	-	Shock	Water
Jannat	Water	Animal	Animal+Water	Vehicle	-	Water	-	-	Animal	-	-	Vehicle	Water	-	Height+Water	Height	Height	Animal	Animal	Height	-	Animal	-	Water	-	-	Height+Vehicle	-	-	Height	Shock	-	-	Tear Gas	Height	Animal+Vehicle	-	-	-	Animal	-
Rubina	Height	-	-	Vehicle	Height+Ice	Water	Gross Food	-	Shock	-	-	Animal	Animal	-	Animal	-	Height	-	-	-	-	Animal	Water	Animal+Water	-	-	Animal	-	-	-	Animal+Dark+Height+Vehicle	-	-	Tear Gas	Height	Animal+Vehicle	Height+Water	Water	Height+Vehicle	-	-
Kanika	Animal	-	-	Animal+Dark+Shock	-	Water	Gross Food	Animal	Animal	-	-	Animal	Animal	Animal	Height	Height	Height	Shock	-	Height	Height	-	-	Water	Animal	Vehicle	Height+Vehicle	Water	-	-	Water	-	-	Tear Gas	Height	Animal+Vehicle	Height+Water	Water	Height+Vehicle	Shock	-
Rajiv	Animal	-	-	Animal	-	Water	Gross Food	-	Shock	Animal	-	Shock	-	-	Height+Water	-	Height	-	Animal	-	-	Animal	-	Water	Animal	-	Height+Vehicle	Shock	-	-	Animal+Dark+Height	Animal	-	Tear Gas	Height	Animal+Vehicle	Height+Water	Water	-	Animal	-
Nishant	Vehicle	-	-	Animal+Height	Height+Ice	Water	Gross Food	-	Shock	-	-	Animal	-	-	Animal	-	Height	Shock	-	Height	-	-	-	Height	Animal	Vehicle	Animal	Shock	-	-	Height+Fire	Animal	Ice+Water	Tear Gas	-	-	-	-	-	Height+Vehicle	Water
Pratik	Height	-	-	Height	-	Water	Gross Food	-	Shock	Animal	-	Vehicle	Water	Animal	-	Height								Height	-	-	Height+Vehicle	Water	-	-	Height+Fire	-	-	Tear Gas	Height	Animal+Vehicle	Height+Water	Water	Height+Vehicle		
Sriti	Height	Animal	-	Animal+Height	-	Water	Gross Food	Animal	Animal	Animal	-	Vehicle	-	-	Height	-	Height	Animal	-	Height	Height	Animal	-	Water	Animal	-	Animal	Water	Height	Height											
Chetna	Animal	Animal	-	Height	-	Water	-	-	Animal	Animal	-	Shock	-	-	Water	-	Height	Shock	-	Height	Height	-	Water																		
Shivangi	Water	-	-	Animal+Dark+Shock	-	Water	-	-	Animal	Animal	Animal	Shock	Water	Animal																											
Aneri	Animal	Animal	Animal+Water	Animal+Dark+Shock	-	Water	Gross Food	Animal	Animal	Animal	Animal																														
Erika	Vehicle	Height	Animal+Water																																						

== Episodes ==
No.	Title	Original release date
1	"Let the adventure begin!"	2 July 2022
2	"Will Chetna conquer her fear?"	3 July 2022
3	"Rohit Shetty, the new competitor!"	9 July 2022
4	"One last chance for Rubina!"	10 July 2022
5	"Rohit heralds the Atyachaar Week"	16 July 2022
6	"Rohit's daring elimination tasks!"	17 July 2022
7	"Get ready for a ride upside down!"	23 July 2022
8	"Kanika-Rubina vs ostriches"	24 July 2022
9	"The relay race challenge"	30 July 2022
10	"Jannat-Rajeev's icy showdown!"	31 July 2022
11	"An electrifying task for the teams"	6 August 2022
12	"Captain Tushar rules"	7 August 2022
13	"A fight for the 'K' medal"	13 August 2022
14	"A wild accusation against Kanika!"	14 August 2022
15	"Creepy crawlies in a box"	20 August 2022
16	"A shocking nomination for Jannat!"	21 August 2022
17	"Rubina-Tushar ace the task!"	27 August 2022
18	"Nishant-Faisal's final face-off"	28 August 2022
19	"The week of fear begins!"	3 September 2022
20	"Fear fanda week special!"	4 September 2022
21	"Nishant displays his prowess!"	10 September 2022
22	"Race to the finale"	11 September 2022
23	"Kanika-Nishant face humiliation"	17 September 2022
24	"Nishant's position is in jeopardy!"	18 September 2022
25	"Jannat-Kanika's last chance!"	24 September 2022
26	"The final hurdle!"	25 September 2022

== Guest appearances ==
Week(s)	Episode(s)	Guest(s)	Note(s)	Ref.
Week 7	Episode 13	Arjun Bijlani	Video message
Week 8	Episode 15	Shakuntla Dilaik	To support Rubina via video message
Week 8	Episode 15	Sudesh Mann	To support Kanika via video message
Week 8	Episode 15	Mrs. Kalia	To support Tushar via video message
Week 8	Episode 15	Mrs. Adatia	To support Rajiv via video message
Week 8	Episode 15	Mrs. Jha	To support Sriti via video message
Week 8	Episode 16	Addite Malik	Video call
Week 10	Episode 20	Addite Malik	Video call
Week 12	Episode 23	Addite Malik	Video call
Week 13	Episode 26	Ranveer Singh, Pooja Hegde, Jacqueline Fernandez, Sanjay Mishra, Johnny Lever, Siddhartha Jadhav and Varun Sharma	To promote Cirkus on grand finale

== Reception ==
The season opened with a TRP rating of 2.5 but soon the ratings dropped.

=== Ratings ===
Week		1	2	3	4	5	6	7	8	9	10	11	12	13
BARC Viewership	TRP	2.5	2.4	2.3	2.2	2.0		1.8	2.0	1.5		1.6	1.4	1.5
BARC Viewership	Rank	2			3	4	8	11	6	16	12	16	17	14
Ref.														

== See also ==
- List of programmes broadcast by Colors TV
