= Arjun Bijlani =

Indian actor (born 1982)

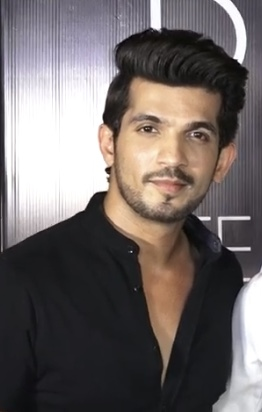
- Bijlani in 2019
- Born: 31 October 1982 (age 43); Mumbai, Maharashtra, India
- Occupations: Actor; Presenter
- Years active: 2004–present
- Known for: Left Right Left; Miley Jab Hum Tum; Naagin; Ishq Mein Marjawan Fear Factor: Khatron Ke Khiladi 11; Laughter Chefs - Unlimited Entertainment
- Spouse: Neha Swami (m. 2013)
- Children: 1

Arjun Bijlani (born 31 October 1982) is an Indian actor who predominantly works in Hindi television. He made his television debut with Ekta Kapoor's show Kartika on Hungama TV. Bijlani is best known for his roles in Left Right Left, Miley Jab Hum Tum, Meri Aashiqui Tum Se Hi, Naagin and Ishq Mein Marjawan.

On the non-fictional front, he participated in Jhalak Dikhhla Jaa 9 and Smart Jodi and hosted Dance Deewane. Bijlani's first Bollywood film Direct Ishq was released in 2016. In 2020, he debuted into digital world with the web series State Of Siege on ZEE5. In 2021, he participated in Fear Factor: Khatron Ke Khiladi 11 and emerged as the winner. He is also the winner of the reality show Rise and Fall.

== Early life and education ==
Arjun Bijlani was born on 31 October 1982 in Bombay, Maharashtra, into a Marathi and Sindhi family. He also has a younger brother named Niranjan Bijlani. At the age of nineteen, he lost his father Sudarshan Bijlani.

He did his schooling from Bombay Scottish School, Mahim and his college from H.R. College of Commerce and Economics.

== Personal life ==
Bijlani married his longtime partner, Neha Swami on 20 May 2013. On 21 January 2015, they became parents to a baby boy whom they named Ayaan Bijlani.

== Career ==
=== Debut and early Breakthrough (2004–2011) ===
Arjun started his television career in 2004 with Balaji Telefilms' youth-based series Kartika opposite Jennifer Winget. He played the role of Ankush, Kartika's love interest. In 2005, Bijlani appeared in another youth television show Remix, playing the role of Vikram. Bijlani had his first noticeable role in the action-based television drama Left Right Left as Cadet Aalekh Sharma.

In 2008, he played Sanjay, a rich fun-loving guy in Deepti Bhatnagar's period drama Mohe Rang De. The same year, he featured in the romantic youth show Miley Jab Hum Tum alongside Rati Pandey, Sanaya Irani and Mohit Sehgal. He played Mayank Sharma, a nerd who falls for a fun-loving girl. This was his first show as a leading actor which received high TRPs. The show ended on 19 November 2010. His next television venture was NDTV Imagine's Pardes Mein Mila Koi Apna alongside Bhavna Khatri. He played the role of Chandrakant Bhosale in the show.

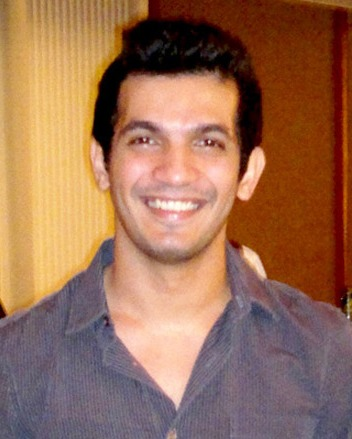
Bijlani in 2012

=== Career fluctuations (2012–2015) ===
In 2012, Arjun hosted UTV Bindass's reality talk show Dell Inspiron Road Diaries. The same year, he also acted in Magic Lantern's telefilm Teri Meri Love Stories on Star Plus opposite Neha Janpandit where he played the role of Raghu, an uncultured guy. Next, he did short films like Full Phukre, I Guess and Caught in the Web. He also appeared as Dev, a police inspector in the television series Kaali – Ek Punar Avatar opposite Aneri Vajani. His next appearance in 2013 was in the series Chintu Ban Gaya Gentleman. His final appearance in 2013 was in the comedy-based cookery drama Jo Biwi Se Kare Pyaar on SAB TV, where he played the role of Aditya Khanna opposite Shweta Gulati. In 2014, he was a player on Box Cricket League.

In 2014, Bijlani featured in an episode of UTV Bindass's Yeh Hai Aashiqui named alongside Perneet Chauhan and Rucha Gujarathi. In March 2015, he entered Balaji Telefilms' romantic television drama series Meri Aashiqui Tumse Hi alongside Radhika Madan and Shakti Arora. He played the role of Shikhar Mehra, a casanova lawyer yet a positive guy who falls in love with Ishani (Madan). He quit the show in August 2015.

=== Establishment with Naagin and success (2015–2021) ===
In September 2015, he signed another thriller show of Balaji Telefilms, Naagin, opposite Mouni Roy. The show aired on Colors TV. In the show, he portrayed a suave and ambitious business tycoon, Ritik Singh, who believes that love and religion are distractions, as they make you weak, but his beliefs are challenged when he comes face-to-face with Roy's character Shivanya. The show received high TRPs and proved to be a turning point in his career. In 2016, he made his Bollywood debut with Baba Motion Pictures' Direct Ishq, co-starring Rajneesh Duggal and Nidhi Subbaiah. He played the role of Kabir Bajpai, a good boy from a rich family, but the film failed at the box office. In July 2016, Bijlani participated in the dance reality show Jhalak Dikhhla Jaa 9, but later got eliminated along with Surveen Chawla.

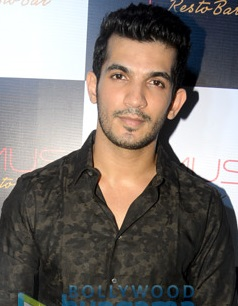
Arjun Bijlani in 2016

In August 2016, he entered Colors TV's Kavach...Kaali Shaktiyon Se starring Mona Singh and Vivek Dahiya, where he played Arhaan, a genie. He also made a guest appearance in Naagin 2 for a few episodes. In November 2016, he played Raghav Mehra in Pardes Mein Hai Mera Dil opposite Drashti Dhami. The show ended on 30 June 2017 due to low TRP's.

In September 2017, Bijlani signed Beyond Dreams Entertainment's Ishq Mein Marjawan which aired on Colors TV, as Deep Raj Singh. The show received good TRPs and ended in June 2019. In 2018, he anchored the dance reality show Dance Deewane. In 2019, Bijlani hosted Colors TV's cooking reality show, Kitchen Champion 5 and made a guest appearance in Naagin 3 for a few episodes.

In 2019, he hosted Dance Deewane 2 on Colors TV. In January 2020, he appeared in a music video named Kehndi Haan Kehndi Naa alongside Sukriti Kakar and Prakriti Kakar. In March 2020, he made his digital debut with State of Siege produced by Contiloe Pictures and distributed by Zee5. He played the role of Major Nikhil Manikrishnan, inspired by Major Sandeep Unnikrishnan. The same year, he appeared in another music video named Ishq Tanha alongside Reem Shaikh.

In 2021, he participated in the stunt-based reality show Fear Factor: Khatron Ke Khiladi 11 on Colors TV. The show was hosted by Rohit Shetty and filmed in Cape Town, South Africa. Bijlani emerged as the winner of the series, beating Divyanka Tripathi and Vishal Aditya Singh in the finale.

=== Expansion to OTT, music videos and further career (2022–present) ===
In January 2022, he hosted Sony TV's India's Got Talent. In February 2022, he participated in Star Plus's Smart Jodi along with his wife, Neha Bijlani and emerged as the 2nd runner-up. The same year, he starred in MX Player's popular web series Roohaniyat as Saveer Rathod which was a super hit. In June 2022, he hosted Star Plus's Ravivaar With Star Parivaar alongside singer Amaal Malik. He also appeared in three music videos in the year 2022. In November 2022, he replaced Rannvijay Singha to Host the fourteenth season of the show MTV Splitsvilla.

Bijlani made a comeback to fiction television in 2023 portraying the character of Dr. Shiv Kashyap in Zee TV's Pyar Ka Pehla Adhyaya: Shiv Shakti opposite Nikki Sharma. The show enjoyed a year long run and ended in August 2024.

In 2024, Bijlani participated in Colours TV reality show called Laughter Chef which became well known and also got an extension. Bijlani and his pair with Kundra was applauded for their fun filled performance. In September 2025, he entered as contestant in the Prime Video's Rise and Fall. On 17 October 2025, he emerged as the winner. In December 2025, he filled in as the host for a few episodes of the third season of Laughter Chefs during Bharti Singh's maternity break.

Since October 2026, he was confirmed to parcipated in Colors TV's Dhammal with Pati Patni Aur Panga – Jodiyon Ka Reality Check with his wife.

== Filmography ==
=== Films ===
Year	Title	Role	Notes	Ref.
2012	Full Phukre	Sukkha	Short film	
2013	I Guess	Manav	Short film	
2013	Caught in the Web	Karan	Short film	
2016	Direct Ishq	Kabeer Bajpai		
2023	Rocky Aur Rani Kii Prem Kahaani	Harry	Cameo	

=== Television ===
Year	Title	Role	Notes	Ref.
2004	Kartika	Ankush	Debut Show	
2005–2006	Remix	Vikram	Supporting Role	
2006–2008	Left Right Left	Cadet Alekh Sharma	Supporting Role	
2008–2009	Mohe Rang De	Sanjay	Lead Role	
2008–2010	Miley Jab Hum Tum	Mayank Sharma	Lead Role	
2011	Pardes Mein Mila Koi Apna	Chandrakant Bhosle	Lead Role	
2012	Road Diaries	Host	First time Anchor	
2012	Teri Meri Love Stories	Raghu	Episodic Role	
2013	Kaali	Dev	Supporting Role	
2013	Yeh Hai Aashiqui	Varun	Episodic Role	
2013	Jo Biwi Se Kare Pyaar	Aditya Khanna	Lead Role	
2014–2015	Box Cricket League 1	Contestant	Team Member	
2015	Killerr Karaoke Atka Toh Latkah	Contestant	Episodic guest contestant	
2015	Meri Aashiqui Tum Se Hi	Shikhar Mehra	Supporting Role	
2015–2016	Naagin	Ritik "Yuvraj" Singh / Sangram Singh	Lead Role	
2016	Box Cricket League 2	Contestant	Team Member	
2016	Jhalak Dikhhla Jaa 9	Contestant	13th place	
2016	Kavach	Arhaan	Supporting Role	
2016–2017	Pardes Mein Hai Mera Dil	Raghav Mehra	Lead Role	
2017–2019	Ishq Mein Marjawan	Deep Raj Singh	Lead Role	
2019	Ishq Mein Marjawan	Raj Deep Singh	Supporting role	
2018	Dance Deewane	Host		
2019	Kitchen Champion 5	Host		
2019	Dance Deewane 2	Host		
2020	State of Siege: 26/11	Major Nikhil Manikrishnan	Zee5 series	
2021	Fear Factor: Khatron Ke Khiladi 11	Contestant	Winner	
2022	India's Got Talent 9	Host		
2022	Smart Jodi	Contestant	2nd runner-up	
2022	Ravivaar With Star Parivaar	Host		
2022	Roohaniyat	Saveer Rathod	MX Player series	
2022–2023	MTV Splitsvilla 14	Host		
2023–2024	Pyar Ka Pehla Adhyaya: Shiv Shakti	Dr. Shiv Kashyap	Lead Role	
2023	India's Got Talent 10	Host		
2024	Laughter Chefs – Unlimited Entertainment	Himself	Season 1	
2025	Laughter Chefs – Unlimited Entertainment	Himself	Season 3	
2025	Rise and Fall	Contestant	Winner	
2026	Chumbak	Mickey Oberoi	Netflix series	
2026–present	Dhammal with Pati Patni Aur Panga – Jodiyon Ka Reality Check	Contestant	Season 2	

==== Special appearances ====
Year	Title	Role	Ref.
2008	Jeevan Saathi	Sanjay / Special appearance	
2008	Rahe Tera Aashirwaad	Sanjay / Special appearance	
2008	Kasautii Zindagii Kay	Mayank Sharma Special appearance	
2008	Kahaani Ghar Ghar Kii	Mayank Sharma Special appearance	
2008	Kyunki Saas Bhi Kabhi Bahu Thi	Mayank Sharma Special appearance	
2008	Kumkum – Ek Pyara Sa Bandhan	Mayank Sharma Special appearance	
2008	Karam Apnaa Apnaa	Mayank Sharma Special appearance	
2009	Dill Mill Gayye	Mayank Sharma Special appearance	
2010	Rang Badalti Odhani	Mayank Sharma Special appearance	
2010	Geet – Hui Sabse Parayi	Mayank Sharma Special appearance	
2010	Pyaar Kii Ye Ek Kahaani	Mayank Sharma Special appearance	
2013	Chintu Ban Gaya Gentleman	Himself / cameo / guest appearance	
2015	Comedy Nights with Kapil	Himself / cameo / guest appearance	
2016	Fear Factor: Khatron Ke Khiladi 7	Himself / cameo / guest appearance	
2016	Comedy Nights Bachao	Himself / cameo / guest appearance	
2016; 2017	Naagin 2	Ritik Singh / cameo	
2016	Saath Nibhaana Saathiya	Raghav Mehra	
2016	Ishqbaaz	Raghav Mehra	
2016	Yeh Hai Mohabbatein	Raghav Mehra	
2017	Yeh Rishta Kya Kehlata Hai	Raghav Mehra	
2017	Bigg Boss 11	Deep Raj Singh / Guest appearance	
2017; 2018	Tu Aashiqui	Deep Raj Singh / Guest appearance	
2019	Naagin 3	Ritik Singh / Guest appearance	
2019	Udaan Sapnon Ki	Deep Raj Singh / Guest appearance	
2019	Rising Star 3	Himself / Guest appearance	
2019	Khatra Khatra Khatra	Himself / Guest appearance	
2019	Bigg Boss 13	Himself / Guest appearance	
2021	Bigg Boss OTT	Himself / Guest appearance	
2021	Dance Deewane 3	Himself / Guest appearance	
2021	Bigg Boss 15	Himself / Guest appearance	
2022	Fear Factor: Khatron Ke Khiladi 12	Himself / Guest appearance	
2022	Saavi Ki Savaari - Ganesh Utsav	Himself / Guest appearance	
2022	Jhalak Dikhhla Jaa 10	Host for (Week 10)	
2023	Tere Ishq Mein Ghayal	Tej / episodic role	
2023	Entertainment Ki Raat Housefull	Himself / Guest appearance	
2024	Dance Deewane 4	Himself / Guest appearance	
2024	Khatron Ke Khiladi 14	Himself / Guest appearance	

=== Music videos ===
Year	Title	Singer(s)	Ref.
2020	Kehndi Haan Kehndi Naa	Sukriti Kakar, Prakriti Kakar	
2020	Ishq Tanha	Siddharth Bhavsar	
2021	Mohabbat Phir Ho Jaayegi	Yasser Desai	
2021	Tum Bewafa Ho	Payal Dev, Stebin Ben	
2021	Mithi Jahi	Mannat Noor	
2021	Saawariya	Aastha Gill, Kumar Sanu	
2022	Dil Pe Zakhm	Jubin Nautiyal	
2022	Ho Gaya Hai Pyaar	Yasser Desai	
2022	Ek Tu Hi Toh Hai	Stebin Ben	

== Awards ==
Year	Award	Category	Show	Ref.
2016	Gold Awards	Best Actor (Critics)	Naagin	
2018	Gold Awards	Best Actor in a Negative Role	Ishq Mein Marjawan	
2019	Gold Awards	Best Host	Dance Deewane and Kitchen Champion	
2019	Gold Awards	Best Hair (Male)	N/A	
2020	Gold Glam and Style Awards	Man of Substance	N/A	
2022	Indian Television Academy Awards	Entertainer of the Year	N/A	
2023	Indian Telly Awards	Best Anchor	Ravivaar With Star Parivaar	

== See also ==
- List of Indian television actors
