= Malegaon Ka Chintu =

- Genre: Comedy drama
- Developed by: 6fzxx 1256790
- Directed by: Shaikh Nasir
- Starring: Al Amin; Ashwini Khairnar
- Country of origin: India
- Original language: Silent
- No. of seasons: 3
- No. of episodes: 75

Production
- Producer: Deepti Bhatnagar
- Camera setup: Multi-camera
- Running time: Approx. 19 minutes
- Production company: Deepti Bhatnagar Productions

Original release
- Network: SAB TV
- Release: 6 August 2010 – 30 November 2014

Malegaon Ka Chintu is an Indian silent comedy series which premiered on SAB TV. The series is produced by Deepti Bhatnagar.The first season premiered on 6 August 2010 and concluded on 26 March 2011.the story revolves around a character named Chintu.

== Overview ==
=== Season 1 ===
The story portrays the life of a small-town boy, Chintu (character loosely based on Mr. Bean), whose life revolves around his coat, his bicycle and his girlfriend, Pinky. They go all over the world and get caught up in hilarious situations, sometimes of Chintu's doings.

=== Season 2 ===
The second season named Chintu Ban Gaya Gentleman premiered on 15 December 2012 and concluded on 6 July 2013. It takes the eventful life of Chintu from the villages of Malegaon straight to exotic locales around the globe

=== Season 3 ===
A third season Chintu Aur Pintu premiered on 27 September 2014 and concluded on 30 November 2014.

== Cast ==
- Al Amin Shaikh as Chintu
- Al Dakin Sing as Pintu
- Ashwini Khairnar as Pinky, Chintu's Girlfriend
