= Marzi Pestonji =

Indian dancer and choreographer (born 1979)

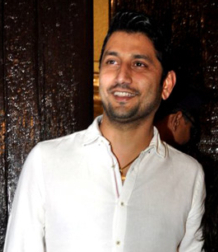
- Pestonji in 2016
- Born: 30 October 1979 (age 46); Gujarat, India
- Other name: Udi Baba
- Occupations: Choreographer; dancer
- Spouse: Kashmira Pestonji

Marzi Pestonji (born 30 October 1979), also known as Udi Baba ("a positive surprise") and Master Marzi, is an Indian dancer and choreographer. He was a judge on Zee TV’s reality dance show Dance India Dance (season 6) (DID) along with Geeta Kapoor and Terence Lewis on Zee TV and on Season 7 of Nach Baliye.

Pestonji is currently a judge on Dance Deewane Juniors (season 1), and recently performed at IKF in Milpitas, California, along with a group of local dancers. He is a member of Shiamak Davar‘s dance team and has been working with him for over 20 years. He has choreographed many music videos and for various movies in India.
