= Tushar Kalia =

Indian choreographer, dancer, actor

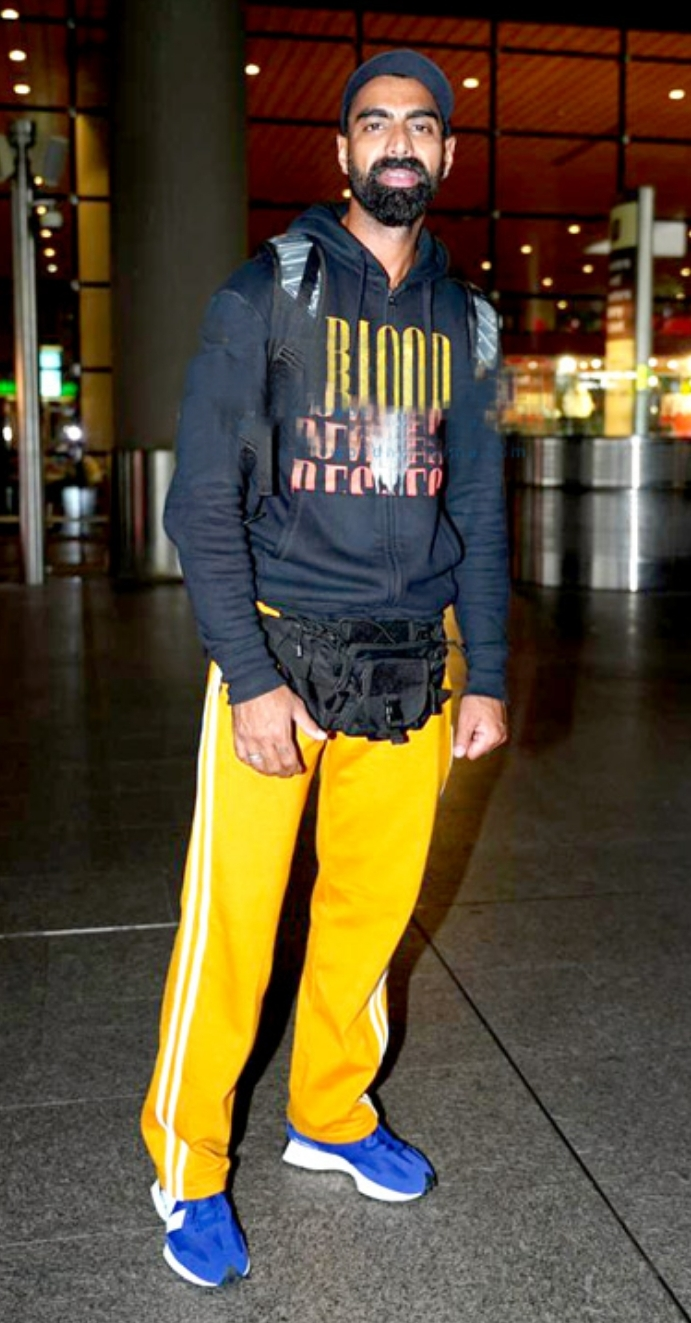
- Kalia in July 2022
- Born: 7 March 1986 (age 39); Chandigarh, India
- Occupations: Choreographer; dancer; actor; stage director
- Years active: 2013–present
- Style: Mayurbhanj Chhau; Kalari; Contemporary
- Spouse: Triveni Barman (m. 2023)

Tushar Kalia (born 7 March 1986) is an Indian choreographer, dancer and actor. He specialises in Mayurbhanj Chhau Odisha, Kalari and Contemporary dance forms. He is the winner of Khatron Ke Khiladi Season 12 (2022). Kalia participated in the dance reality shows, Jhalak Dikhhla Jaa 6 (2013) and Jhalak Dikhhla Jaa 7 (2014) as a choreographer. He was also the stage director of the reality show India's Got Talent (2015—2016) in its 6th and 7th season.

== Personal life ==
Kalia was born in Chandigarh, India. In 2022 he got engaged to model, Triveni Barman, in presence of family members and close friends, The duo got married on 18 January 2023.

== Career ==
Kalia started his career as a choreographer in Bollywood after his first break in Karan Johar's film Ae Dil Hai Mushkil and judged the dance reality show Dance Deewane. He also choreographed in films like Half Girlfriend, War, The Zoya Factor, Junglee, Ok Jaanu, Hate Story 4, and Dhadak.

Kalia began his dancing and directing career with Shri Santosh Nair, the creative director of Sadhya Unit of Performing Arts. He is also trained under Canadian choreographer, Brandy Leary, for Ariel technique dancing. Kalia has performed with international choreographers for a production in Birmingham, titled, Motherland. He also appeared as an actor in Hindi feature film, ABCD: Any Body Can Dance.

== Filmography ==
=== Television ===
List of Tushar Kalia television credits
Year	Title	Role
2013	Jhalak Dikhhla Jaa 6	Choreographer
2014	Jhalak Dikhhla Jaa 7	Choreographer
2015	India's Got Talent 6	Stage director
2016	India's Got Talent 7	Stage director
2018	Dance Deewane	Judge
2019	Dance Deewane 2	Judge
2019	Khatra Khatra Khatra	Guest
2019	Kitchen Champion 5	Guest
2021	Dance Deewane 3	Judge
2022	Fear Factor: Khatron Ke Khiladi 12	Winner

=== Film ===
List of Tushar Kalia film credits
Year	Title	Role
2013	ABCD: Any Body Can Dance	Actor
2016	Ae Dil Hai Mushkil	Choreographer
2017	Ok Jaanu	Choreographer
2017	Half Girlfriend	Choreographer
2017	Qarib Qarib Singlle	Choreographer
2018	Hate Story 4	Choreographer
2018	Dhadak	Choreographer
2018	Namaste England	Choreographer
2019	Junglee	Choreographer
2019	The Zoya Factor	Choreographer
2019	War	Choreographer
2020	Dolly Kitty Aur Woh Chamakte Sitare	Choreographer
2022	Lekh	Choreographer

=== Music video ===
List of Tushar Kalia music video credits
Year	Title	Role
2017	Main Yaar Manana Ni	Choreographer

== Awards ==
Year	Award	Category	Work	Result	Ref.
2016	FOI Online Awards	Best Choreography for "The Breakup Song"	Ae Dil Hai Mushkil	Nominated	
2020	IIFA Award	Best Choreography	War	Won	
