= Tejasswi Prakash =

Indian actress

- Tejasswi in 2025
- Born: Tejasswi Prakash Wayangankar; 10 June 1993 (age 33); Jeddah, Saudi Arabia
- Citizenship: India
- Education: University of Mumbai (B.E)
- Occupation: Actress
- Years active: 2012–present

Tejasswi Prakash Wayangankar (born 10 June 1993) is an Indian actress who works in Hindi television, streaming series and Marathi films. She is a recipient of an Indian Television Academy Award and an Indian Telly Award. She is best known for portraying Ragini Gadodia in Swaragini – Jodein Rishton Ke Sur and Pratha Gujral in Naagin 6.

She participated in the reality shows Fear Factor: Khatron Ke Khiladi 10 (2020), and Bigg Boss 15 (2021), emerging as the winner in the latter. For her performance in Naagin 6, she won the Indian Television Academy Award for Best Actress – Popular in 2023.

She made her Marathi film debut with Mann Kasturi Re (2022), which earned her a Filmfare Award for Best Female Debut – Marathi nomination.

In 2025, she participated in the first season of Celebrity MasterChef India, finishing as the second runner-up. In 2026, she starred as Charu Lata in the streaming romantic thriller series Psycho Saiyaan.

== Early life and education ==
Tejasswi was born on 10 June 1993 in Jeddah, in the Mecca Province of Saudi Arabia to Indian parents. She was raised in Mumbai in a Marathi family.

She is an engineer by education. She graduated with a Bachelor of Engineering degree in Electronics and Telecommunications Engineering from the Rajiv Gandhi Institute of Technology of the University of Mumbai.

== Career ==
=== Early work (2012–2018) ===
Tejasswi began her acting career in 2012, with Life OK's thriller 2612 playing Rashmi Bhargava. In 2013, she was seen playing Dhara Vaishnav in Colors TV's soap opera Sanskaar - Dharohar Apnon Ki opposite Jay Soni.

From 2015 to 2016, she portrayed the leading role of Ragini Maheshwari in Colors TV's popular drama romance Swaragini - Jodein Rishton Ke Sur, which earned her nominations for Indian Telly Awards and Golden Petal Awards.

In 2017, she was seen portraying Diya Singh in Sony TV's mystery drama Pehredaar Piya Ki. After Pehredaar Piya Ki ended, Tejasswi was re-cast as Diya Singh in Rishta Likhenge Hum Naya.

In 2018, she portrayed Uruvi in Star Plus's mythological drama Karn Sangini opposite Aashim Gulati.

=== Career progression (2019–present) ===
In 2019, Tejasswi was seen portraying Mishti Malhotra in the second season of Voot's romantic drama Silsila Badalte Rishton Ka alongside Kunal Jaisingh and Aneri Vajani.

In 2020, she made her reality TV debut through participation in Colors TV's popular stunt-based show Fear Factor: Khatron Ke Khiladi 10. Despite being one of the strongest contenders, she had to quit the show midway through after suffering a severe eye injury which ended her journey at 6th place.

In 2021, she participated in Colors TV's reality show Bigg Boss 15 where she survived for 17 weeks inside the house and emerged as the winner of the show.

Shortly after her victory, in February 2022, she was cast as the lead in Ekta Kapoor's popular supernatural franchise Naagin 6 as the protagonist Pratha Gujral, a shape-shifting serpent. She essayed multiple characters across the show's storyline, including Pratha Gujral, Prathna Gujral, and Pragati Iyer Shukla. The season went on to become the longest-running installment of the Naagin franchise.

In November 2022, Tejasswi made her Marathi debut alongside Abhinay Berde in the romantic drama Mann Kasturi Re directed by Sanket Mane, which gave her a nomination for the Best Actress Debut at the Filmfare Marathi Awards 2022.

In April 2023, she was seen as the lead actress of Marathi film School College Ani Life produced by Rohit Shetty.

In 2025, she participated in the inaugural season of Celebrity MasterChef India, where she finished as the second runner-up. One of her dishes, “Dosa Bomboloni”, was featured at Chef Vikas Khanna’s restaurant Bungalow in New York following her appearance on the show.

In 2026, Tejasswi made her OTT fiction debut with the romantic thriller series Psycho Saiyaan (TV series), which premiered on Amazon MX Player. She portrayed the lead role alongside Ravi Kishan and Anud Singh Dhaka. The series received mixed reception, although her performance was noted positively for showcasing a darker and more layered role compared to her previous television appearances.

The same year, she also appeared alongside longtime partner Karan Kundrra in Netflix’s reality series Desi Bling, which revolved around the lives of affluent Indians residing in Dubai.

Prakash made her debut as a mentor in the fifth season of the gaming reality show Playground (web series) . Her team won the championship title, with contestant Madhuja Ghoshal emerging as the season's ultimate winner.

== Personal life ==
Tejasswi is engaged to actor and host Karan Kundrra, they have been in a relationship since 2021. They participated in the reality show Bigg Boss 15 and started dating in BB15 house.

== In the media ==
Post Naagin, Tejasswi has established herself among the leading and highest-paid actresses of Indian television. She was also included by Femina in its Beautiful Indians 2022 list, "Celebs for Good", for her contributions to the welfare of stray animals and challenged individuals.

She was included by HT City in its 30 Under 30 list of 2022 for the Television category. She was awarded the Digital Sensation of the Year at Filmfare Middle East 2022 held in Dubai.

She secured the 8th position in the UK list of the Top 50 Asian Celebrities in the World by Eastern Eye in 2022 and the 12th position in 2023, for her work in Indian television. In 2023, she ranked 4th in Times Now "Popular Television Actresses" list.

== Filmography ==
=== Television ===
Year	Title	Role	Notes	Ref.
2012–2013	2612	Rashmi Bhargava		
2013	2613	Rashmi Bhargava		
2013–2014	Sanskaar – Dharohar Apnon Ki	Dhara Vaishnav		
2015–2016	Swaragini - Jodein Rishton Ke Sur	Ragini Gadodia Maheshwari		
2017	Pehredaar Piya Ki	Diya Singh		
2017–2018	Rishta Likhenge Hum Naya	Diya Singh		
2018–2019	Karn Sangini	Uruvi		
2019	Silsila Badalte Rishton Ka 2	Mishti Malhotra		
2019	Shaadi Ho To Aisi	Jiya		
2020	Fear Factor: Khatron Ke Khiladi 10	Contestant	6th place	
2021	Zee Comedy Show	Comedian		
2021–2022	Bigg Boss 15	Contestant	Winner	
2022–2026	Naagin	Pratha Gujral	Main (season 6)	
2022–2026	Naagin	Prathna Ahlawat	Main (season 6)	
2022–2026	Naagin	Pragati Shukla	Main (season 6); Guest (season 7)	
2024	Family Table	Herself		
2025	Celebrity MasterChef India	Contestant	2nd Runner-up	
2025	Celebrity Masterchef - Masterclass	Panelist		
2025–2026	Laughter Chefs – Unlimited Entertainment season 3	Contestant	1st runner up	
2026	Playground 5	Mentor	Season 5	Winner

==== Special appearances ====
Year	Title	Role	Ref.
2014	Beintehaa	Dhara	
2014	Parichay	Dhara	
2015	Comedy Nights with Kapil	Ragini	
2015–2016	Sasural Simar Ka	Ragini	
2016	Krishnadasi	Ragini	
2016	Balika Vadhu	Ragini	
2016	Ishq Ka Rang Safed	Ragini	
2016	Thapki Pyar Ki	Ragini	
2016	Udaan	Ragini	
2016	Comedy Nights Live	Ragini	
2016	Comedy Nights Bachao	Ragini	
2016	Box Cricket League 2	Herself	
2018	Swisswale Dulhania Le Jayenge 2	Simran	
2019	Ace of Space 2	Herself	
2019	Kitchen Champion 5	Herself	
2019	Shaadi Ho Toh Aisi	Jiya	
2020	Bigg Boss 15	Herself	
2021	Chala Hawa Yeu Dya	Herself	
2022	Spy Bahu - Rang Barse 2022	Pratha Gujral	
2022	Khatra Khatra Khatra	Herself	
2022	Dance Deewane Juniors 1	Herself	
2022	Lock Upp	Herself	
2022	Saavi Ki Savaari - Ganesh Utsav	Pratha Gujral	
2022	Fu Bai Fu	Herself	
2023	Chala Hawa Yeu Dya	Herself	
2023	Entertainment Ki Raat Housefull	Herself	
2023	Bekaboo	Prathna Ahlawat	
2023	Temptation Island: Pyaar Ki Pariksha	Herself	
2024	Family Table	Herself	
2024	Laughter Chefs – Unlimited Entertainment season 1	Herself	
2025	Super Dancer	Herself	
2025	Indian Idol (Hindi TV series) season 15	Herself	
2025	Laughter Chefs – Unlimited Entertainment season 2	Herself	
2025	Pati Patni Aur Panga – Jodiyon Ka Reality Check (2X)	Herself	
2026	MTV Splitsvilla 16	Herself	

=== Web shows ===
Year	Title	Role
2019	Silsila Badalte Rishton Ka 2	Mishti Malhotra
2020	Ladies vs Gentlemen	Panelist
2026	Psycho Saiyaan	Charu Lata
2026	Desi Bling	Herself

=== Music videos ===
Year	Title	Singer(s)	Ref.
2020	Intezaar	Ikka, Themxxnlight	
2020	Sunn Zara	JalRaj	
2020	Ae Mere Dil	Abhay Jodhpurkar	
2020	Kalakaar	Kulwinder Billa	
2021	Fakira	Amit Mishra	
2021	Mera Pehla Pyaar	Javed Ali, Nikhita Gandhi	
2022	Duaa Hai	Vineet Singh	
2022	Kyun Na Aaye	Pranav Vatsa	
2022	Rula Deti Hai	Yasser Desai	
2022	Baarish Aayi Hai	Stebin Ben, Shreya Ghoshal	
2023	Door Hova Gey	Jassie Gill	
2023	Aidan Na Nach	Amar Jalal	
2024	Revolver	Gippy Grewal	

=== Films ===
Year	Title	Role	Ref.
2022	Mann Kasturi Re	Shruti Sarnaik	
2023	School College Ani Life	Indu	

== Awards and nominations ==
Year	Award	Category	Work	Result	Ref
2015	Indian Telly Awards	Best Actress in a Negative Role	Swaragini - Jodein Rishton Ke Sur	Nominated	
2022	Lokmat Stylish Awards	Most Stylish Emerging Icon	—N/a	Won	
2022	Pinkvilla Screen and Style Icons Awards	Super Stylish TV Couple (With Karan Kundra)	—N/a	Won	
2022	Indian Television Academy Awards	Best Actress Popular	Naagin 6	Nominated	
2023	Filmfare Marathi Awards	Best Actress Debut	Mann Kasturi Re	Nominated	
2023	Bollywood Hungama Style Icons	Most Stylish TV Actor (Female)	—N/a	Won	
2023	Pinkvilla Style Icons Awards	Stunningly Stylish Actress TV	—N/a	Won	
2023	Indian Telly Awards	Best Actress Female	Naagin 6	Nominated	
2023	Indian Telly Awards	Favorite Actress in Mythology Role	Naagin 6	Nominated	
2023	Nickelodeon Kids' Choice Awards India	Favorite TV Actress	Naagin 6	Nominated	
2023	Indian Television Academy Awards	Best Actress Popular	Naagin 6	Won	
2025	Pinkvilla Screen and Style Icons Awards	Most Stylish TV Actor (Female)	—N/a	Won	
2025	Indian Telly Awards	Style & Substance Star	—N/a	Won	
