= Temptation Island =

Temptation Island may refer to:

- Temptation Island (1959 film), a French drama film
- Temptation Island (1980 film), a 1980 Filipino film
- Temptation Island (2011 film), a 2011 remake film of the 1980 film
- Love Wrecked (also known as Temptation Island internationally), a 2005 romantic-comedy film
- Temptation Island (TV series), an American TV series
- "Temptation Island", a 2001 song by Love as Laughter from the album Sea to Shining Sea
- Temptation Island, a novel by Victoria Fox
- Temptation Island: Pyaar Ki Pariksha, an Indian reality series
