= One Two Three =

- Theatrical release poster
- Directed by: Ashwni Dhir
- Written by: Sumanta Mukhopadyay
- Screenplay by: Ashwni Dhir
- Produced by: Kumar Mangat; Sunil Lulla
- Starring: Sunil Shetty; Tushar Kapoor; Paresh Rawal; Esha Deol; Neetu Chandra; Sameera Reddy; Upen Patel; Tanishaa
- Narrated by: Irrfan Khan
- Cinematography: Nirmal Jani
- Edited by: Suresh Chaturvedi
- Music by: Raghav Sachar
- Production company: Big Screen Entertainment Pvt. Ltd
- Distributed by: Eros Entertainment
- Release date: 28 March 2008
- Running time: 137 minutes
- Country: India
- Language: Hindi
- Box office: ₹27 crore

One Two Three is a 2008 Indian Hindi-language comedy film directed by Ashwini Dhir. The film stars Sunil Shetty, Paresh Rawal, Tushar Kapoor, Esha Deol, Sameera Reddy, Neetu Chandra, Upen Patel and Tanisha Mukerji. It revolves around three men who share the same name — Laxmi Narayan. The film performed moderately well at the box office and was an above average grosser movie especially in the rural areas and suburban areas and some tier 2 cities.

== Premise ==
Laxmi 1 lives a poor man's lifestyle in Mumbai with his widowed mother Kanta, who wants him to be a gangster and would like him to kill people, make money, then marry Chota Khujli's daughter, Meena Khujli. To fulfill his mother's wish, he accepts a contract to kill D'Mello Yadav, a Pondi-based gangster who has stolen a diamond.

Laxmi 2, is the detailed and obedient Secretary of D.M. Pipat. He wants him to buy a vintage car from a Pondi-based used car dealer, Laila.

Laxmi 3 sells undergarments and runs a business, "Bulbul Lingerie," with his son, Sonu; he travels to Pondi to meet with his new supplier, Jiya.

The trio book hotel rooms next to each other in Blue Diamond Hotel. Their respective lives are hilariously turned upside down when their names cause all three to end up in the wrong places. They are also hiding from Inspector Mayawati Chautala, who is attracted to Laxmi 2.

== Cast ==
- Suniel Shetty as Laxmi Narayan 2
- Tushar Kapoor as Laxmi Narayan 1
- Paresh Rawal as Laxmi Narayan 3
- Esha Deol as Jiya, Laxmi Narayan 1's love interest.
- Sameera Reddy as Laila, car dealer.
- Neetu Chandra as Inspector Mayawati Chautala
- Murali Sharma as Murli Manohar Munde
- Upen Patel as Chandu
- Tanishaa as Chandni
- Mukesh Tiwari as D'Mello's Yadav "Papa"
- Sanjay Mishra as Pinto, Yadav's goon 1.
- Vrajesh Hirjee as Albert, Yadav's goon 2.
- Usha Nadkarni as Kanta Narayan, Laxmi Narayan 1's mother.
- Manoj Pahwa as Batlya Bhai
- Arjun Punj as Sonu Narayan, Laxmi Narayan 3's son.
- Ashwin Mushran as D.M. Pipat, Laxmi Narayan 2's boss.
- Rohitash Gaud as Recovery Agent (cameo appearance)
- Irrfan Khan as Narrator
- Jitu Shivhare as Chhota Khujl

== Soundtrack ==
One Two Three

Soundtrack album by Raghav Sachar
- Released: 5 February 2008
- Genre: Feature film soundtrack
- Label: Eros Music

| Track | Title | Singer(s) |
|---|---|---|
| 1 | "One Two Three" | Kunal Ganjawala, Raghav Sachar, Earl Edgar D'Souza, Mahalaxmi Iyer |
| 2 | "Rock Mahi" | Raghav Sachar, Sunidhi Chauhan |
| 3 | "Gup Chup" | Raghav Sachar, Mahalakshmi Iyer |
| 4 | "One Two Three" (Amalgamation) | Kunal Ganjawala, Kaptan Laadi, Kshitij Tarey, Kailash Kher, Raghav Sachar, Aditya Dhar |
| 5 | "I Wanna Guy" | Sunidhi Chauhan |
| 6 | "Gup Chup" (Remix) | Raghav Sachar, Mahalakshmi Iyer |
| 7 | "One Two Three" (Club Mix) | Kunal Ganjawala, Raghav Sachar, Earl Edgar D'Souza, Mahalaxmi Iyer |
| 8 | "Lakshami Narayan" | Ninad Kamat |
| 9 | "One Two Three" (Ballad) | Raghav Sachar |
