= Desi Bling =

2026 Netflix reality television series

- Genre: Reality television
- Showrunner: Marcel Dufour
- Starring: Rizwan Sajan; Adel Sajan; Sana Sajan; Satish Sanpal; Tabinda Sanpal; Karan Kundrra; Tejasswi Prakash; Alizey Mirza; Lailli Mirza; Mona Mirza; Dyuti Parruck; Pamala Serena; Iryna Kinakh; Janvee Gaur
- Country of origin: United Arab Emirates
- Original languages: Hindi; English
- No. of seasons: 1
- No. of episodes: 7

Production
- Executive producer: Mazen Laham
- Production company: Different Productions

Original release
- Network: Netflix
- Release: 20 May 2026 – present

Desi Bling is a reality television series that premiered on Netflix on 20 May 2026, with a first season of seven episodes. Produced by the Dubai-based company Different Productions, it follows a group of wealthy Indian expatriates living in Dubai, United Arab Emirates. It is a companion series to the same company's Dubai Bling.

The series reached number one on Netflix in India and the United Arab Emirates within 48 hours of its release and entered the platform's top ten in more than fifteen countries. Reviewers were largely unfavourable, describing it as staged and preoccupied with displays of wealth.

== Premise ==
Desi Bling follows affluent Indian expatriates in Dubai as their business interests, social lives and personal rivalries overlap, with an emphasis on luxury, status and shifting alliances within the group.

== Cast ==
- Rizwan Sajan, founder and chairman of the Danube Group
- Adel Sajan, his son
- Sana Sajan, Adel Sajan's wife
- Satish Sanpal, founder and chairman of ANAX Holding
- Tabinda Sanpal, his wife
- Karan Kundrra, television personality
- Tejasswi Prakash, television personality
- Alizey Mirza and Lailli Mirza, twin social-media creators
- Mona Mirza, their mother
- Dyuti Parruck, business executive
- Pamala Serena, fashion influencer
- Iryna Kinakh, fashion influencer
- Janvee Gaur

Indian film figures including Shilpa Shetty, Vivek Oberoi and Tamannaah Bhatia appear as guests.

== Production ==
Desi Bling was produced by Different Productions, a Dubai company founded by Mazen Laham, which had previously created Dubai Bling for Netflix. Laham said the earlier show's reception had demonstrated that reality television from the MENA region could travel internationally, which led the company to develop a series aimed at Indian audiences. He described a Dubai studio making a series for Netflix India and reaching number one in both India and the United Arab Emirates as "a first for the region".

Marcel Dufour served as showrunner. He said the production sought cast members with "history, ambition, vulnerability, and points of view that naturally collide" rather than familiar reality-television types. Responding to claims that the series was scripted, Dufour said that "everything you have seen is completely real, completely unscripted", and that the team shot one episode at a time and shaped the following episode around what had been filmed. Laham said that the cast's cars, homes and events were their own and that the production's creative contribution lay in how these were filmed.

Laham attributed the show's popularity to aspiration, saying that viewers "like to see their dreams on screen", and that its appeal rested on the cast and their storylines.

== Release and reception ==
The series was released on Netflix on 20 May 2026. Within two days it was the most-watched title on Netflix in India and the United Arab Emirates, and it appeared in the service's top ten in more than fifteen countries.

Critical response was largely negative. Writing for Open, Kaveree Bamzai called it "peak cringe viewing" and argued that its displays of wealth concealed emptiness. Binged rated the series one star out of five, writing that "absolutely nothing feels organic" and that arguments appeared "exactly when the episode needs drama".
