= MTV Love School =

- Genre: Reality television
- Created by: Vishal Mull
- Based on: Love Island
- Presented by: Upen Patel and Karishma Tanna (2015); Karan Kundra and Anusha Dandekar (2016–2019)
- Starring: Ramiz King - Pratik Sehajpal - Gizelle Basiri
- Country of origin: India
- Original language: Hindi
- No. of seasons: 4
- No. of episodes: 87

Production
- Camera setup: Multi-camera
- Production company: Endemol India

Original release
- Network: MTV India
- Release: 5 December 2015 – 3 August 2019

MTV Love School is an Indian reality television series that premiered on 5 December 2015 on MTV India.

The first season was hosted by Upen Patel and Karishma Tanna, and the subsequent seasons were hosted by Karan Kundra and Anusha Dandekar. The series focuses on the relationships of real-life couples.

Love School Season 4 was the first Indian reality TV show to have a Gay couple featured.

== Series ==
Season	Hosts	Launch Date	Finale Date	Contestants		Episodes	Winners	Runners-up	
Season	Hosts	Launch Date	Finale Date	Couples	Singles	Episodes	Winners	Runners-up	
1	Upen Patel and Karishma Tanna	5 December 2015	5 March 2016	10	None	22	Tushar and Karishma	Kabir and Pooja	Maddy and Silky
2	Karan Kundra and Anusha Dandekar	5 November 2016	18 February 2017	10	None	20	Pasha Doll and Khem Raj	Bhavya and Rasika	Honey and Ashiya
3	Karan Kundra and Anusha Dandekar	12 May 2018	29 September 2018	6	13	21	Lalit and Divya	Aviral and Sakshi	Ujjwal and Aditi
4	Karan Kundra and Anusha Dandekar	23 February 2019	3 August 2019	6	16	24	Tajinder (Sunny) Cheema and Manpreet Kaur	Dev Sood and Poojan Solanki	Ali Raza Shaikh and Aasheema Chauhan

== Season 1 ==
- Winners: Tushar and Karishma
- Runners-up: Kabir and Pooja
- 3rd place: Malkit and Gurpreet (Maddy and Silky)

=== Contestants ===
Names	Status	Episode	Finish
Tushar Vashist and Karishma Kapur	Finalist	Episode 21	Winners
Kabir Raj and Pooja Mishra	Finalist	Episode 21	Runners-up
Malkit and Gurpreet (Maddy and Silky)	Finalist	Episode 21	3rd place
Deepesh Sekhri and Khwaab Arora	Graduated	Episode 20	4th
Abhishek Sharma and Veronica Rajput	Graduated	Episode 17	5th
Zain and Vishakha [Wild Card - Entered Episode 15]	Fake Couple	Episode 16	–
Gaurav and Akanksha	Eliminated	Episode 13	6th
Ankit and Vishakha	Eliminated	Episode 11	7th
Jagnoor and Manisha [Wild Card - Entered Episode 8]	Broke-off	Episode 10	–
Karan Singh and Neha Singh	Eliminated	Episode 8	8th

== Season 2 ==
- Winners: Pasha Doll and Khemraj Bhardwaj
- Runners-up: Bhavya and Rasika
- 3rd place: Honey and Ashiya

=== Contestants ===
Names	Status	Episode	Finish
Pasha Doll and Khemraj Bhardwaj	Finalist	Episode 20	Winners
Honey and Ashiya	Finalist	Episode 20	Runners-up
Shivam and Sophia	Finalist	Episode 20	3rd place
Bhavya and Rashika	Graduated	Wild Card Entered - ?? Episode 20	4
Varun and Jacqueline	Thrown Out	Episode 19	5
Anjali and Ashraf	Graduated	Wild Card Entered - ?? Episode 18	6
Jagnoor and Monica	Broke-Off	Episode 16	–
Bhuvan and Ranjana	Fake Couple Thrown Out	Episode 13	–
Ipsita and Sandeepan	Graduated	Episode 10	7th
Pranav and Rashika	Walked, Pranav Health Issues	Episode 8	–

== Season 3 ==
Winners : Divya and Lalit
Runners-up :Sakshi and Aviral
3rd place : Aditi and Ujjwal

=== Couples ===
Names	Place	Episode	Finish
Aditi Pandey and Ujjawal Pathak	Mumbai	Episode 21	3rd place
Mohit Duseja and Sakshi Mago	Delhi	N/A	Runners-up
Daizy Batra and Ankit Arora	Delhi and Mumbai	Episode 17	7
Deepali Ogale and Lakshya Sharma	Ludhiana and Surat	Episode 7	9
Aakash Lall and Payal Gupta		Episode 38	

=== Singles ===
Name	Age	Hometown	Finish	Place
Christeena Biju	24	Kerala	Episode 34	6 8
Divya Sharma	19	Shimla	Episode 34	6 8
Aviral Gupta	30	Delhi	Episode 14; Re-entry in Episode 16 Episode 21	8
Pratik Sehajpal	32	New Delhi	Episode 6	9
Riya Ahuja	25	Delhi	Episode 6	9
Ruhi Sharma	24	New Delhi	Episode 36	7
Lalit Chaudhary	33		Episode 36	7

Indicates the contestant is male.
Indicates the contestant is female.

=== Wild-cards ===
Name	Age	Hometown	Entry	Finish	Place
Khushi Mukherjee	21	Mumbai	Episode 9 Re-entry in Episode 16	Episode 16; Re-eliminated in Episode 19	8
Madhav Sharma	22	Hoshiarpur	Episode 10; Re-entry in Episode 16	Episode 16; Re-eliminated in Episode 19	8
Vishakha Raghav	19	Delhi	Episode 10	Episode 17	6
Nishank Rajpal & Mansi Batra	21 & 18	Delhi	Episode 10	Episode 13	9

Indicates the contestant is male.
Indicates the contestant is female.

=== Summary ===
Contestant	2-6	7-10	11,14	14,20	20,24	24,28	29,30	31,32	33	34	35	36,37	38
Divya	SAFE	SAFE	WIN	WIN	WIN	SAVED	WIN	WIN	Win	SAVED	WIN	SAFE	Winner
Lalit	WIN	WIN	WIN	BTM2	WIN	SAVED	WIN	BTM2	Lost	SAVED	WIN	SAFE	Winner
Sakshi	SAFE	WIN	WIN	SAFE	BTM	WIN	BTM2	SAVED	Win	WIN	BTM2	SAFE	1st Runner-up
Aviral	SAFE	SAVED	WIN	WIN	WIN	WIN	ELIM		Re-entry	WIN	SAFE	SAFE	1st Runner-up
Aditi	SAFE	SAFE	WIN	SAFE	WIN	WIN	Win	SAFE	Win	SAFE	BTM3	SAFE	2nd Runner-up
Ujjwal	SAFE	SAFE	WIN	SAFE	WIN	WIN	BTM3	SAFE	Win	SAFE	BTM3	SAFE	2nd Runner-up
Vishakha	SAFE	WIN	SAFE	SAFE	BTM	Lost	BTM4	SAVED	Lost	WIN	LOST	Left	
Pratik	SAFE	SAVED	SAFE	WIN	ELIM	WIN	ELIM		Re-entry	WIN	LOST	Left	
Kushi	Not in competition			Wild-Card	BTM3	BTM3	WIN	ELIM	Re-entry	Lost	ELIM		
Madhav	Not in competition			Wild-Card	WIN	ELIM	SAFE	ELIM	Re-entry	Lost	ELIM		
Mohit	WIN	SAFE	SAFE	WIN	ELIM	WIN	WIN	WIN	Lost	LEFT			
Christeena	WIN	WIN	SAFE	WIN	SAVED	WIN	SAFE	SAFE	Lost	QUIT			
Laxya	Not in Competition			Wild-Card	WIN	ELIM	SAFE	WIN	Lost	ELIM			
Vishakha	WIN	WIN	SAFE	WIN	SAVED	WIN	SAFE	SAFE	Lost	ELIM			
Mansi	Not in Competition			Wild-Card	WIN	QUIT							
Nishank	Not in Competition			Wild-Card	BTM3	QUIT							
Nisha	BTM2	BTM2	WIN	ELIM									
Nitin	BTM2	ELIM	SAFE	ELIM									
Daisy			QUIT										
Ankit		WIN	ELIM										
Gargana			ELIM										
Payal		QUIT											
Akash		ELIM											
Sumit	ELIM												
Ruhi	ELIM												

The contestant won the Love Exam.
The contestant won the Assignment.
The contestant was Safe.
The contestant was saved by Karan & Anusha.
Indicates the contestant was not in the competition.
Indicates the contestant wild card entry in the competition.
The contestant was in the bottom.
The contestant was Voted-out.
The contestant quit the competition.
The contestant was originally eliminated but was saved.
The contestant was originally saved but had to leave due to no partner.
The contestant was Winner of the MTV Love School Season 3.

=== Voting history ===
Episode-	3	5	7		9	11	13	14	16		17	19	20-21	
Power Couple:	none		Aviral & Sakshi		Laxya, Deepali & Pratik	Lalit & Divya	none	Lalit & Divya	Pratik & Vishakha	none				
Lalit	N/A	Akash; Nisha	Bottom 2		Bottom 2	Nishank; Christeena	Nishank; Vishakha	Aviral; Sakshi	Bottom 2	-	Laxya; Deepali	Not eligible	Winner	
Divya	N/A	Akash; Payal	Lalit; Gergana	Gergana	Bottom 2	Nishank; Christeena	Nishank; Mansi	Aviral; Christeena	Bottom 2	-	Laxya; Deepali	Not eligible	Winner	
Ujjwal	N/A	Nitin; Nisha	Ankit; Daizy	Gergana	Lalit; Nisha	Pratick; Kushi	Madhav; Vishakha	Bottom 3	~~Madhav~~; ~~Kushi~~	-	Laxya; Deepali	Bottom 3	Runner-up	
Aditi	Nisha; Sumit	Nitin; Nisha	Lalit; Gergana	Daizy	~~Lalit~~; ~~Nisha~~	Pratick; Kushi	Madhav; Vishakha	Bottom 3	~~Madhav~~; ~~Divya~~	-	Laxya; Deepali	Bottom 3	Runner-up	
Aviral	N/A	Akash; Payal	Ankit; Daizy	Daizy	~~Lalit~~; ~~Divya~~	Pratick; Kushi	Madhav; Vishakha	Bottom 3	Eliminated	Re-entry	Laxya; Vishakha	Not eligible	Runner-up	
Sakshi	Nitin; Nisha	Nitin; Nisha	Lalit; Gergana	Gergana	Lalit; Nisha	Bottom 3	Madhav; Vishakha	Bottom 3	~~Madhav~~; ~~Kushi~~	-	Pratik; Vishakha	Bottom 3	Runner-up	
Mohit	Nitin; Ruhi	Nitin; Nisha	Ankit; Daizy	Daizy	Nitin; Nisha	Bottom 3	Bottom 3	Bottom 3	~~Lalit~~; ~~Kushi~~	-	Pratik; Vishakha	Bottom 3	Left	
Christeena	Sumit; Ruhi	Akash; Nisha	Ankit; Daizy	Gergana	~~Lalit~~; ~~Divya~~	Bottom 3	Nishank; Vishakha	Bottom 3	Eliminated	Re-entry	Laxya; Vishakha	Not eligible	Left	
Kushi	Not in Competition				Wild-Card	Bottom 3	Bottom 3	Mohit; Sakshi	Bottom 2	Re-entry	Laxya; Vishakha	Bottom 3	Re-Eliminated	
Madhav	Not in Competition				Wild-Card	Pratick; Kushi	Bottom 3	Ujjwal; Aditi	Bottom 2	Re-entry	Laxya; Vishakha	Bottom 3	Re-Eliminated	
Pratick	N/A	Akash; Payal	Ankit; Gergana	Gergana	Lalit; Nisha	Bottom 3	Nishank; Mansi	Ujjwal; Sakshi	Madhav; Kushi	-	Bottom 2	Left		
Deepali	N/A	Nitin; Nisha	Lalit; Gergana	Gergana	Nitin; Divya	Nishank; Christeena	Madhav; Vishakha	Ujjwal; Sakshi	~~Madhav~~; ~~Kushi~~	-	Bottom 2	Quit		
Vishakha	Not in Competition				Wild-Card	Pratick; Christeena	Bottom 3	Ujjwal; Aditi	Madhav; Kushi	-	Bottom 2	Eliminated		
Laxya	Sumit; Ruhi	Nitin; Nisha	Ankit; Daizy	Daizy	Nitin; Divya	Nishank; Christeena	Nishank; Vishakha	Aviral; Christeena	~~Madhav~~; ~~Kushi~~	-	Bottom 2	Eliminated		
Nishank	Not in Competition				Wild-Card	Bottom 3	Bottom 3	Quit						
Mansi	Not in Competition				Wild-Card	Pratick; Kushi	Bottom 3	Quit						
Nitin	Bottom 2	Bottom 2	Ankit; Daizy	Daizy	Bottom 2	Eliminated								
Nisha	Bottom 2	Bottom 2	Lalit; Gergana	Gergana	Bottom 2	Eliminated								
Daizy	N/A	Akash; Payal	Bottom 2		Quit									
Ankit	Sumit; Ruhi	Akash; Payal	Bottom 2		Eliminated									
Gergana	Nitin; Ruhi	Akash; Payal	Bottom 2		Eliminated									
Payal	N/A	Bottom 2	Quit											
Akash	N/A	Bottom 2	Eliminated											
Sumit	Bottom 2	Eliminated												
Ruhi	Bottom 2	Eliminated												
Notes	1, 2	3, 4	5, 6, 7, 8		9, 10	11, 12, 13	14, 15	16, 17	18, 19	20				
Eliminated / Quitted	Ruhi	Akash	Gergana		Nisha	No; Elimination	Mansi	Aviral	Madhav	Aviral	Laxya	Madhav	Christeena	Mohit
Eliminated / Quitted	Ruhi	Akash	Ankit		Nisha	No; Elimination	Mansi	Aviral	Madhav	Christeena	Vishakha	Madhav	Ujjwal	Aditi
Eliminated / Quitted	Sumit	Payal	Ankit		Nitin	No; Elimination	Nishank	Christeena	Kushi	Madhav	Deepali	Kushi	Aviral	Sakshi
Eliminated / Quitted	Sumit	Payal	Daizy		Nitin	No; Elimination	Nishank	Christeena	Kushi	Kushi	Pratick	Kushi	Lalit	Divya

These contestants won a special Advantage in the Judgement Night.
Indicates the contestant was not in the competition.
Indicates the contestant wild card entry in the competition.
The contestant was in the bottom.
The contestant was Voted-out.
The contestant quit the competition.
The contestant was originally eliminated but was saved.
The contestant was originally saved but had to leave due to no partner.
The contestant won MTV Love School Season 3.
The contestant was the runner-up.

==== Notes ====
- ^Note 1: This season Karan & Anusha had the power not to eliminate a couple but to save a couple in the bottom. And the contestants had the power to vote-out one boy & one girl in the bottom.
- ^Note 2: In week 1, Karan & Anusha saved Ankit & Daizy.
- ^Note 3: In week 2, Karan & Anusha saved Aviral & Christeena.
- ^Note 4: In this week, Nisha was the girl with higher votes to eliminate than Payal, but Payal decided to quit with Akash. Therefore, Nisha was brought back in the game.
- ^Note 5: Aviral & Sakshi had the power to swap 1 of the couples in the danger with 1 of the safe couples. They chose Mohit & Nisha to swap with Laxya & Deepali.
- ^Note 6: In week 3, Karan & Anusha saved Laxya & Deepali.
- ^Note 7: As it was tie between Daizy and Gergana. Contestants had to vote again to vote-out 1 of the girls.
- ^Note 8: As Ankit was eliminated, Daizy decided to quit with Ankit.
- ^Note 9: Laxya, Deepali & Pratick had a special power to nullify one of the other contestant's vote. Laxya chose Christeena, Deepali chose Aviral & Pratick chose Aditi.
- ^Note 10: In week 4, as it was tie between Lalit and Nitin, Karan & Anusha decided to eliminate Nitin.
- ^Note 11: In week 5, Karan & Anusha saved Laxya & Deepali.
- ^Note 12: Lalit & Divya had a special power to eliminate one from Christeena and Kushi. They chose Christeena.
- ^Note 13: There was no elimination this week. Therefore, Pratick & Christeena were safe.
- ^Note 14: In week 6, Karan & Anusha saved Lalit & Divya.
- ^Note 15: Actually, Madhav & Vishakha were eliminated, but Nishank & Mansi quit the show due to Mansi's grandmother health problem.
- ^Note 16: Lalit & Divya had a super power to send one of the save couples into the danger zone. They chose Mohit & Sakshi.
- ^Note 17: This week contestants voted to eliminate but the Twist was the voting was to save. Therefore, Ujjwal & Sakshi were save and Aviral, Christeena, Mhit & Aditi were in the bottom 2. Then Karan & Anusha had the power to eliminate one couple. They chose Aviral & Christeena.
- ^Note 18: In week, Karan & Anusha saved Mohit & Sakshi.
- ^Note 19: This week contestants voted to eliminate but the Twist was the votes were all nullified. And only Pratick & Vishakha had the ultimate power to eliminate one couple. They chose Madhav & Kushi.
- ^Note 20: This week Aviral & Christeena and Madhav & Kushi returned for another chance to be back in the game.

=== Guests ===
- Prince Narula and Yuvika Chaudhary

== Season 4 ==
=== Couples ===
Name:	Age:	Hometown:	Finish:	Place:
Tajinder (Sunny) and Manpreet Kaur	N/A	Punjab & Orissa	Episode 24	Winners
Dev Sood and Poojan Solanki	N/A	Mumbai	Episode 24	1st Runners-up
Ramiz King and Gizelle	22	Australia	Episode 16; Re-entry in Episode 16; Re-eliminated in Episode 23	4
Navpreet Singh and Tanvi Khanna	20 & 19	Australia	Episode 12	9
Nipun Dhawan & Rowhi Rai	21 & 21	Noida & Jalandhar	Episode 8	12/13
Rowhi Arora and Ritika Kapoor	21 & 21	Panipat	Episode 5	14

=== Singles ===
Name	Age	Hometown	Finish	Place
Sagar Anand	24	New Delhi	Episode 23	5
Gunjan Dalal	22	Delhi	Episode 20	6
Mukkta Karandikar	24	Mumbai	Episode 9 Re-entry in Episode 16; Re-eliminated in Episode 19	7
Eliza Sehgal	21	Delhi	Episode 10	10
Gaurav Dutt Sharma	25	Gurgaon	Episode 10	10
Sahil Narang	25	New Delhi	Episode 9	11
Harsh Khullar	25	Delhi	Episode 8	12/13
Soumya Sood	25	Noida	Episode 8	12/13
Aishwariya Kamal	22	Delhi	Episode 3	15
Kapil Chhabra	24	New Delhi	Episode 3	15

Indicates the contestant is male.
Indicates the contestant is female.

=== Wild-cards ===
Name	Age	Hometown	Entry	Finish	Place
Ali Raza Shaikh	25	Mumbai	Episode 6 Re-entry in Episode 16	Episode 15; Finished in Episode 24	2nd Runners-up
Asheema Chauhan	23	Mumbai	Episode 6 Re-entry in Episode 16	Episode 15; Finished in Episode 24	2nd Runners-up
Aishwariya Africawala	22	Mumbai	Episode 6	Episode 23	5
Rishabh Chauhan	21	New Delhi	Episode 11	Episode 20	6
Shafan Samdani	22	Delhi	Episode 6	Episode 19	7
Vaishali Panwar	24	Delhi	Episode 11	Episode 16	8

Indicates the contestant is male.
Indicates the contestant is female.

=== Summary ===
Contestant	2-3	4-5	6-8		9-10	11-12	13-14	15-16	16	17-19		19-20	21-23	23-24
Manpreet	SAFE	WIN	SAFE		SAFE	WIN	SAFE	WIN	-	ELIM		SAFE	SAFE	Winner
Sunny	SAFE	WIN	SAFE		SAFE	BTM3	SAFE	WIN	-	QUIT		SAFE	SAFE	Winner
Dev	SAFE	SAVED	WIN		WIN	SAFE	WIN	SAFE	-	LOSE	WIN	WIN	WIN	1st Runner-up
Poojan	SAFE	SAVED	WIN		WIN	SAFE	WIN	SAFE	-	LOSE	WIN	WIN	WIN	1st Runner-up
Ali	Not in Competition		WIN		SAVED	SAFE	QUIT		Re-entry	SAFE		SAFE	BTM2	2nd Runner-up
Asheema	Not in Competition		SAFE	BTM	SAVED	WIN	ELIM		Re-entry	SAFE		SAFE	BTM2	2nd Runner-up
Gizelle	SAFE	SAFE	WIN		WIN	SAFE	BTM3	SAFE	-	BTM		WIN	SAVED	ELIM
Ramiz	SAFE	SAFE	WIN		SAVED	SAFE	BTM3	ELIM	Re-entry	WIN	WIN	WIN	SAVED	ELIM
Africa	Not in Competition		LOSE		BTM2	SAVED	WIN	SAVED	-	WIN	SAFE	BTM2	ELIM	
Sagar	SAFE	SAFE	BTM		SAFE	SAVED	WIN	SAVED	-	LOSE	SAVED	BTM2	ELIM	
Gunjan	SAFE	WIN	Disqualified		Re entry-	Btm 3	SAVED	BTM2	-	WIN		ELIM		
Rishabh	Not in Competition					WIN	BTM3	SAFE	-	BTM		ELIM.		
Mukkta	BTM4	SAFE	SAFE		WALK				Re-entry	LOSE	SAVED	LEFT		
Shafan	Not in Competition		LOSE	WIN	Eliminated	Btm 3	Safe	Btm 3	Re- entry	ELIM		LEFT		
Vaishali	Not in Competition					Quit								
Navpreet	WIN	BTM2	SAVED		BTM2	ELIM								
Tanvi	BTM4	BTM2	SAVED		ELIM									
Eliza	WIN	SAFE	SAVED		ELIM									
Gaurav			WIN											
Sahil		WIN												
Nipun														
Rowhi	WIN													
Harsh														
Soumya														
Bhavay														
Ritika														
Aishwariya														
Kapil														

The contestant won the Love Exam.
The contestant won the Assignment.
The contestant was Safe.
The contestant was saved by Power Couple/Karan & Anusha.
Indicates the contestant was not in the competition.
Indicates the contestant Re-entry in the competition.
Indicates the wild card contestant won the Special Wild card/Re-entry competition.
Indicates the wild card contestant lost the Special Wild card/Re-entry competition.
The contestant was in the bottom.
The contestant was Voted-out.
The contestant quit the competition.
The contestant was originally eliminated but was saved.
The contestant had to leave due to family issues.
The contestant was originally saved but had to leave due to no partner.
The contestant won MTV Love School Season 3.
The contestant was the runner-up.
The contestants were eliminated during the semi-final.

=== Voting history ===
Episode-	3	5	8	10	12	14	16		18-19	20	23	23-24
Power Couple(s):	none	Sahil & Gunjan	Poojan, Dev & Gaurav	Shafan & Gizelle; Dev & Poojan	Ali & Asheema; Rishabh & Manpreet	Poojan & Dev	Sunny & Manpreet	-	Ramiz & Gunjan	Ramiz & Gizelle	none	
Manpreet	N/A	Bhavay; Ritika	N/A	Gaurav; Eliza	N/A	Ali; Asheema	Ramiz; Gunjan	-	Bottom	Rishabh; Gunjan	~~Ali~~; ~~Asheema~~	Winner
Sunny	Kapil; Aishwariya	Bhavay; Ritika	Harsh; Sahil; Rowhi; Soumya	Gaurav; Eliza	Bottom 3	Rishabh; Asheema	Ramiz; Vaishali	-	Bottom	Rishabh; Gunjan	~~Ali~~; ~~Asheema~~	Winner
Dev	Kapil; Aishwariya	Bhavay; Ritika	N/A	Gaurav; Eliza	Navpreet; Tanvi	Ali; Asheema	Ramiz x2 Vaishali x2	-	Sunny; Manpreet	Rishabh; Gunjan	~~Ali~~; ~~Asheema~~	1st Runner-up
Poojan	Kapil; Aishwariya	Bhavay; Ritika	Harsh; Nipun; Asheema; Soumya	Gaurav; Eliza	Shafan; Vaishali	Ali; Asheema	Ramiz; Vaishali	-	Not present	Rishabh; Gunjan	Sagar; Africa	1st Runner-up
Ali	Not in Competition		N/A	Gaurav; Eliza	Sunny; Gunjan	Bottom 3	Quit	Re-entry	Rishabh; Manpreet	Rishabh; Gunjan	Bottom 2	2nd Runner-up
Asheema	Not in Competition		Bottom	Gaurav; Eliza	N/A	Bottom 3	Eliminated	Re-entry	Sunny; Manpreet	Rishabh; Gunjan	Bottom 2	2nd Runner-up
Gizelle	Gaurav; Mukkta	Bhavay; Ritika	N/A	Gaurav; Africa	Shafan; Vaishali	Bottom 3	Ramiz; Gunjan	-	Bottom	Rishabh; Gunjan	~~Ali~~; ~~Asheema~~	Eliminated
Ramiz	Nipun; Tanvi	Bhavay; Ritika	Harsh; Nipun; Asheema; Rowhi	Gaurav; Eliza	Sunny; Vaishali	Bottom 3	Bottom 2	Re-entry	Rishabh; Manpreet	Rishabh; Gunjan	~~Ali~~; ~~Asheema~~	Eliminated
Africa	Not in Competition		Harsh; Nipun; Soumya; Rowhi	Bottom 2	Navpreet; Tanvi	Rishabh; Vaishali	~~Shafan~~; ~~Vaishali~~	-	Shafan; Manpreet	Bottom 2	Bottom 2	Eliminated
Sagar	Kapil; Aishwariya	Bhavay; Ritika	Bottom	Navpreet; Africa	Navpreet; Tanvi	Ali; Asheema	Ramiz; Vaishali	-	Shafan; Gizelle	Bottom 2	Bottom 2	Eliminated
Gunjan	N/A	Bhavay; Ritika	Harsh; Nipun; Asheema; Soumya	Navpreet; Africa	Bottom 3	Rishabh; Asheema	Bottom 2	-	Shafan; Gizelle	Bottom 2	Eliminated	
Rishabh	Not in Competition				N/A	Bottom 3	Ramiz; Gunjan	-	Bottom	Bottom 2	Eliminated & Ejected	
Mukkta	Bottom 4	Bhavay; Ritika	Harsh; Sahil; Asheema; Soumya	Walked (Family Issues)				Re-entry	Shafan; Gizelle	Left		
Shafan	Not in Competition		Sagar; Nipun; Soumya; Rowhi	Gaurav; Eliza	Bottom 3	Rishabh; Vaishali	Bottom 2	-	Bottom	Left		
Vaishali	Not in Competition				Bottom 3	Bottom 3	Bottom 2	Eliminated				
Navpreet	Kapil; Aishwariya	Bottom 2	N/A	Bottom 2	Bottom 3	Eliminated						
Tanvi	Bottom 4	Bottom 2	N/A	Gaurav; Africa	Bottom 3	Eliminated						
Eliza	Nipun; Tanvi	Bhavay; Ritika	N/A	Bottom 2	Eliminated							
Gaurav	Bottom 4	N/A	N/A	Bottom 2	Eliminated							
Sahil	Kapil; Aishwariya	Navpreet; Tanvi	Bottom	Walked (Family Issues)								
Nipun	Bottom 4	Navpreet; Tanvi	Bottom	Eliminated								
Rowhi	Kapil; Aishwariya	Bhavay; Ritika	Bottom	Eliminated								
Harsh	Bottom 4	Navpreet; Tanvi	Bottom	Eliminated								
Soumya	Bottom 4	N/A	Bottom	Eliminated								
Bhavay	N/A	Bottom 2	Eliminated									
Ritika	N/A	Bottom 2	Eliminated									
Aishwariya	Bottom 4	Eliminated										
Kapil	Bottom 4	Eliminated										
Eliminated / Quit	Kapil	Bhavay	Harsh	Sahil	Navpreet	Asheema	Ramiz	Ramiz	Shafan	Shafan	Sagar & Africa	Ramiz & Gizelle
Eliminated / Quit	Kapil	Bhavay	Soumya	Mukkta	Navpreet	Asheema	Ramiz	Mukkta	Manpreet	Mukkta	Sagar & Africa	Ali & Asheema
Eliminated / Quit	Aishwariya	Ritika	Nipun	Gaurav	Tanvi	Ali	Vaishali	Ali	Manpreet	Rishabh	Sagar & Africa	Dev & Poojan
Eliminated / Quit	Aishwariya	Ritika	Rowhi	Eliza	Tanvi	Ali	Vaishali	Asheema	Sunny	Gunjan	Sagar & Africa	Sunny & Manpreet

These contestants won a special Advantage in the Judgement Night.
Indicates the contestant was not in the competition.
Indicates the contestant re-entered the competition.
The contestant was in the bottom.
The contestant was Voted-out.
The contestant quit the competition.
The contestant was originally eliminated but was saved.
The contestant had to leave due to family issues.
The contestant was originally saved but had to leave due to no partner.
The contestant won MTV Love School Season 4.
The contestant was the runner-up.
The contestants were eliminated during the semi-final.

=== Guests ===
- Prince Narula and Yuvika Chaudhary in episode 13 as substitute professors.
