= Elvish Yadav =

Indian Actor, Singer, YouTuber and social media influencer

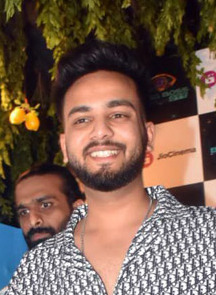
- Yadav in 2023
- Born: Siddharth Yadav; 14 September 1997 (age 29); Wazirabad, Gurgaon, Haryana, India
- Education: Hansraj College
- Occupations: YouTuber; Vlogger
- Years active: 2016–present

YouTube information
- Channels: Elvish yadav; Elvish Yadav Vlogs; Elvish Yadav Gaming
- Genres: Comedy; vlogs; entertainment; gaming; reaction
- Subscribers: 15.8 million (main channel); 25 million (combined) (Note: Subscribers of the three main channels are included:)
- Views: 1.61 billion (main channel); 4 billion (combined)
- Last updated: 30 December 2025

Elvish Yadav (born Siddharth Yadav; 14 September 1997) is an Indian YouTuber, singer, and, television personality. He gained recognition on YouTube, through his comedy skits, vlogs, and social commentary.

Yadav won Bigg Boss OTT 2 in 2023, becoming the first wild card contestant to lift the trophy.

In 2024, Yadav captained the Haryanvi Hunters team in the celebrity Entertainers Cricket League (ECL) T10 tournament. Under his leadership, Haryanvi Hunters dominated the league stage and reached the final, which was played against the Lucknow Lions. In the final match, Haryanvi Hunters chased down the target and defeated Lucknow Lions to win the inaugural ECL trophy.

He appeared in reality shows such as MTV Roadies XX: Double Cross as a gang leader and Colors TV's Laughter Chefs – Unlimited Entertainment in 2025, achieving victories in both shows during his inaugural appearances in their respective formats.

== Early life and career ==
Yadav was born on 14 September 1997 as Siddharth Yadav to Ram Avtar Yadav and Sushma Yadav in Haryana, India. He went to Amity International School, Gurgaon and later joined Hansraj College, Delhi, to complete his Bachelor of Commerce degree.

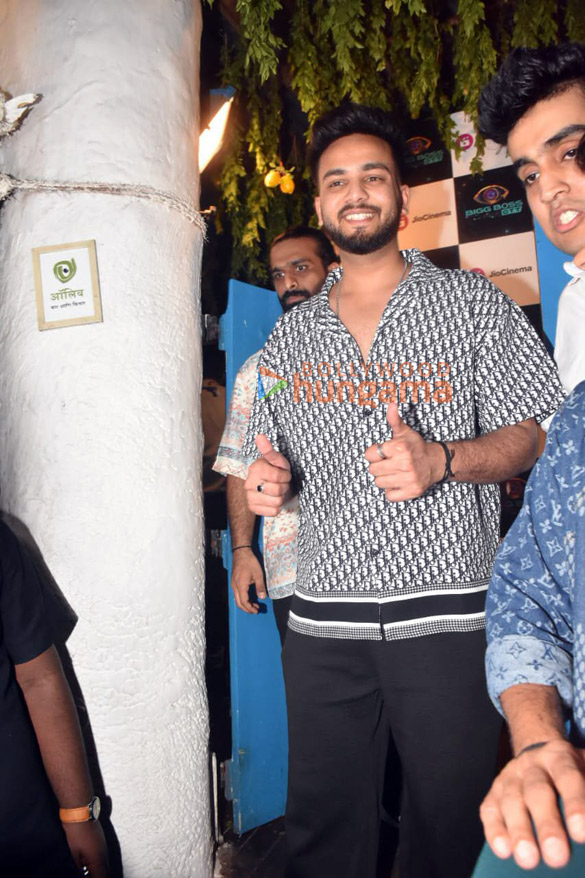
Elvish Yadav at the Bigg Boss OTT 2) success party at Khar, Mumbai

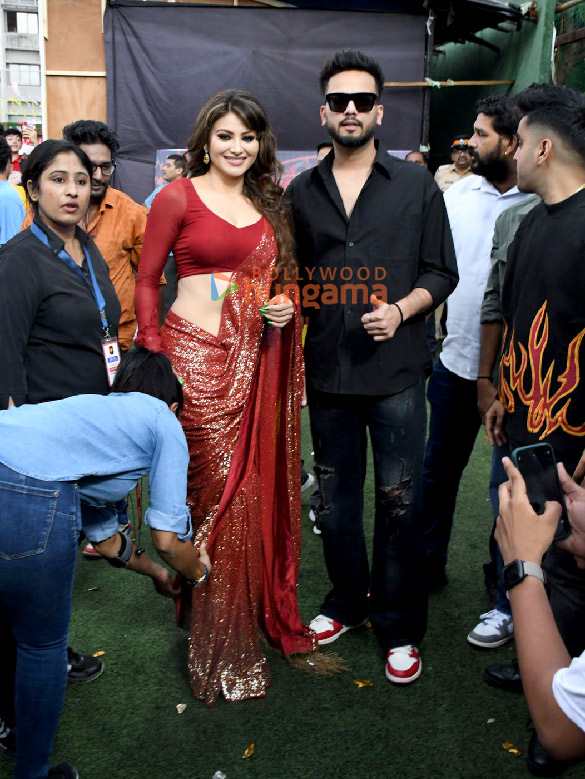
Elvish Yadav with Urvashi Rautela at the Narsee Monjee College of Commerce and Economics fest in Juhu promoting their song Hum Toh Deewane

After drawing inspiration from successful Indian YouTubers like Harsh Beniwal, Yadav launched his YouTube journey on 29 April 2016, eventually amassing over 15.8 million subscribers and more than 1.61 billion views by the end of 2025.

=== 2016–2023: Career Beginnings ===
He initially named his YouTube channel as The Social Factory, but later rebranded it to Elvish Yadav. On this main channel, he focuses on comedy sketches, creative flash fiction, conceptual short films and engaging entertainment content. To expand his digital presence, Yadav introduced additional channels Elvish Yadav Vlogs and Elvish Yadav Gaming.

Elvish launched a new YouTube channel, titled Elvish Yadav Vlogs on 23 November 2019. Yadav's channel had 15.5 million subscribers and 134 million views as of February 2024. He shares daily vlogs, lifestyle content, travel videos, and light-hearted commentary with friends and family. He also started a new gaming channel Elvish Yadav Gaming in May 2023.

=== 2023: Bigg Boss OTT Season 2 ===
In 2023, Elvish crossed over from digital content into mainstream entertainment by participating in Bigg Boss OTT (Hindi Season 2) as a wildcard entrant. Elvish Yadav entered Bigg Boss OTT 2 as a wild card contestant, joining the show several weeks after it had begun. Despite the late entry, his arrival quickly changed the dynamics of the house, driven by his strong fan following and outspoken personality. His colloquial style, humour, and catchphrases helped him connect with the audience almost immediately.

Inside the house, Elvish formed notable bonds with contestants such as Abhishek Malhan and Manisha Rani, while also being involved in multiple confrontations and heated exchanges. His journey was marked by a mix of entertainment, controversies, and strategic gameplay, which kept him consistently in the spotlight throughout the season. Public support played a decisive role in his success. Despite competition from strong finalists, Elvish received massive audience votes and went on to win Bigg Boss OTT 2, becoming the first wild card entrant in Bigg Boss history to lift the OTT trophy. He won a cash prize of ₹25 lakh, finishing ahead of Abhishek Malhan in the finale.

=== 2024: Playground Season 4 and ECL T10 ===
Elvish Yadav served as one of the mentors on Playground Season 4, a popular Indian reality-gaming web series that streamed on Amazon MX Player in 2024. In this season, he led the KO Krakens team with contestants competing in a mix of gaming challenges and entertainment tasks. His team member Gaurav Singh (known as BT Android) emerged as the winner of the season, marking a successful stint for Elvish as a mentor in the series.

In 2024, Yadav also took on the role of captain for the Haryanvi Hunters in the Entertainers Cricket League (ECL), a celebrity cricket tournament. The league stage and play-offs concluded with the final match played between Haryanvi Hunters, led by Elvish Yadav, and Lucknow Lions. Haryanvi Hunters emerged as the winners, defeating Lucknow Lions by four wickets in the final league match.

=== 2025: MTV Roadies XX, Laughter Chefs and Bigg Boss 19 ===
Elvish Yadav made his debut in the MTV Roadies franchise in 2024 as a gang leader on MTV Roadies XX: Double Cross. His entry marked a shift for the show, bringing a prominent digital creator into a leadership role alongside established faces like Gautam Gulati, Neha Dhupia, Prince Narula, and Rhea Chakraborty. Throughout the season, Elvish was actively involved in strategic decisions and competitive tasks, often making headlines for clashes and alliances with other gang leaders.

Despite being his first season, his leadership proved effective, as his gang member Kushal Tanwar (Gullu) went on to win the season. With Gullu’s victory, Elvish became one of the few gang leaders to win Roadies in their debut season, further strengthening his transition from digital fame to mainstream reality television.

Elvish Yadav participated in Laughter Chefs – Unlimited Entertainment Season 2, a celebrity cooking-comedy reality show on Colors TV hosted by Bharti Singh with Chef Harpal Singh Sokhi as judge. During the season, Elvish teamed up with Karan Kundrra, who joined mid-season, and together they competed against other celebrity duos in entertaining culinary challenges that blended humour and food.

Over the course of the season, Elvish and Karan impressed both the audience and the judge with their chemistry, fun personalities, and evolving cooking skills. In the grand finale aired on 27 July 2025, they emerged as the winners of Season 2, scoring the highest audience stars and taking home the trophy ahead of runner-up pair Aly Goni and Reem Shaikh. Elvish later shared heartfelt gratitude to fans and the show’s team for the support throughout the journey.

Elvish Yadav made a special guest appearance on Bigg Boss (Hindi Season 19). Rather than participating as a contestant, Elvish appeared during a Weekend Ka Vaar segment alongside Salman Khan, interacting with housemates and playing an integral part in a task designed for the show’s contestants.

=== Other work ===
Beyond his creator career, Yadav has diversified into entrepreneurship and philanthropy. He is the founder of a youth-focused clothing brand called Systumm Clothing and runs the Elvish Yadav Foundation, an NGO aimed at supporting underprivileged children and social welfare initiatives.

== Legal issues ==
=== Flower pot theft case (2023) ===
In March 2023, Elvish Yadav's name was trending in connection with a government owned flower pot theft case. He stated in a tweet that the vehicle shown in the video related to the theft did not belong to him.

=== Discriminatory and sexist comments against Arjun Bijlani (2023) ===
In September 2023, Yadav generated additional controversy when he misgendered Arjun Bijlani as "a woman". This particular statement, deemed offensive and inappropriate, attracted extensive criticism and condemnation from various quarters.

=== Smuggling of venom from wild snakes (2023) ===
On 3 November 2023, Noida Police filed an FIR against Elvish and five others after nine venomous snakes, including cobras, were found in their possession. These snakes and snake venom were used at alleged illegal raves. The case was initiated based on a complaint from BJP MP Maneka Gandhi's NGO, who accused Elvish of shooting videos with snakes and hosting unauthorised parties with snake venom and drugs. An undercover operation led to the arrest of five individuals who named Elvish Yadav as the mastermind. Later, on 17 March 2024, Yadav, along with five others, was arrested under the Wild Life (Protection) Act, 1972, and Section 120A (criminal conspiracy) of the Indian Penal Code for arranging snake venom at rave parties. Subsequently, they were sent to judicial custody for 14 days, where Yadav confessed to arranging snake venom. On 20 March 2024, the probe against Yadav spread to additional cases in Goa and Punjab. On 22 March 2024, Yadav was granted bail by the Gautam Buddha Nagar district court.

On March 21, 2026, the Supreme Court of India quashed the criminal proceedings, holding that the alleged substance did not fall under the scheduled list of the NDPS Act and that the complaint under the Wildlife Protection Act was not filed by an authorised officer. However, the Court clarified that authorities may initiate fresh proceedings by following due legal procedure.

=== Assault and death threats against YouTuber Maxtern (2024) ===
On 8 March 2024, footage of Yadav, along with multiple companions, assaulting, physically abusing and giving death threats to fellow content creator, Sagar Thakur (known online as MaxTern) at a garment shop in Gurgaon, went viral online. According to India Today, an FIR has been registered against him. The altercation supposedly happened after a social media clash, in which Thakur criticised Yadav for his controversial activities, including his alleged involvement in the snake venom case.

=== Fake lifestyle (2024) ===
In March 2024, it was revealed that Yadav had been fabricating aspects of his lifestyle to project a glamorous and affluent image on social media. This revelation came from his parents during an emotional interview on a national news channel, where they tearfully disclosed that Yadav's online persona was not reflective of his real life. They claimed that his actions were motivated by a desire to gain social media engagement and attention.

=== Dispute with Manisha Rani (2024) ===
Following their association on Bigg Boss OTT 2, Yadav became involved in a public disagreement with fellow reality television personality Manisha Rani. In 2024, Rani unfollowed Yadav on social media and later addressed the decision in interviews, stating that it was related to issues of self-respect and alleging that Yadav displayed excessive ego in personal interactions. She emphasised that maintaining dignity was more important than continuing public associations.

Subsequent media coverage reported that Yadav dismissed the unfollowing as “childish,” while Rani reiterated that her decision was based on personal boundaries and professional self-respect. Entertainment outlets described the exchange as reflective of tensions between the two following the show and highlighted contrasting perspectives on professionalism and interpersonal conduct.

The episode drew significant public reaction, with fans and commentators widely discussing the fallout across social media platforms. Several reports noted that audience reactions were divided, with some supporting Rani’s stance on self-respect, while others defended Yadav, turning the issue into a broader online debate about professionalism and behaviour among reality-show personalities after the conclusion of the programme.

=== Offensive Remarks against Bigg Boss 18 Finalist Chum Darang (2025) ===
In February 2025, Yadav faced criticism for making offensive comments about Bigg Boss 18 finalist Chum Darang during a podcast with Rajat Dalal. He questioned why Karan Veer Mehra would be interested in Chum and labelled her name as "ashleel" (vulgar).

=== Shooting at Gurugram home (2025) ===
On 17 August 2025, the residence of Yadav in Gurugram's Sector 57 was targeted in a shooting incident around 5:30–6:00 a.m. Three unidentified assailants on motorcycles fired over two dozen rounds at the house, damaging the ground and first floors, including windows, doors, and balconies, as captured on CCTV footage. Yadav was not present at the time, but family members and caretakers were inside; no injuries were reported. Gurugram Police initiated an investigation, collecting forensic evidence and reviewing CCTV footage.

A social media post attributed to the "Bhau Gang," allegedly led by fugitive gangster Himanshu Bhau, claimed responsibility, citing Yadav's purported promotion of illegal betting apps, though this claim remains unverified. Yadav's father, Ram Avtar Yadav, stated that no prior threats were received.

=== Donation appeal controversy (2025) ===
In late 2025, Yadav faced public scrutiny after sharing a social-media donation appeal for the medical treatment of a child suffering from Spinal Muscular Atrophy (SMA). The controversy escalated following remarks by comedian and television personality Munawar Faruqui, who alleged that some non-governmental organisations pay influencers to promote charity campaigns. Although Faruqui did not name Yadav, the comments triggered online speculation linking them to Yadav’s appeal.

Yadav denied the allegations, stating that he does not accept payment for charity-related posts and that the campaign he shared was genuine and transparent. Media reports noted that, as of the time of coverage, no First Information Report (FIR) or official investigation had been registered against him, describing the matter as a social-media-driven controversy rather than a legally established fraud case.

Public criticism further intensified after a widely circulated YouTube video alleged that an individual who had previously appeared alongside Yadav had a history of misleading social-media fundraising practices. The video claimed such content was designed to generate engagement and mislead audiences, contributing to questions about Yadav’s judgment and associations. Media coverage, however, emphasised that these claims originated from online commentary and that no legal findings of wrongdoing had been established against Yadav in relation to the donation appeal.

== Filmography ==
=== Television ===
Year	Title	Role	Notes	Ref.
2021	Elvish Yadav			
2022	Hungama			
2023	Bigg Boss OTT (Hindi Season 2)	Contestant	Winner	
2023	Playground (Season 3)	Mentor	Winner	
2024	Playground (Season 4)	Mentor	Winner	
2025	MTV Roadies XX: Double Cross	Gang Leader	Winner	
2025	Laughter Chefs – Unlimited Entertainment (Season 2)	Contestant	Winner	
2025	Bigg Boss (Hindi Season 19)	Guest		
2025–2026	Laughter Chefs – Unlimited Entertainment (Season 3)	Contestant	Runner-up	
2025	Indian Game Adda	Host		
2025	Adda Extreme Battle	Host		
2025	Aukaat Ke Bahar	Actor	Played the character of Rajveer Ahlawat (Boxer)	
2026	Engaged (Season 2)	Host		

=== Music video ===
Year	Title	Role	Artist(s)	Notes	Ref.
2022	BAD GUY (DG)	Actor	DG Immortals		
2023	Systumm	Actor	DG Immortals		
2023	Punja Daab	Actor	Parmish Verma		
2023	Rao Sahab	Actor	Amar Kharkiya		
2023	Hum Toh Deewane	Actor	Yasser Desai		
2023	Meter Khench Ke	Actor	R Cruze, Virtual_Af, Love Kataria		
2023	Bolero	Actor	Asees Kaur, Preetinder		
2024	Rao Sahab Rollin'	Actor	SDEE, VKey		
2026	Justin Bieber	Singer/Actor	Elvish Yadav, Anu Amanat, Isha Malviya		

== Discography ==
Singles and collaborations

Year	Title	Role	Artist(s)	Notes	Ref.
2021	Apna Gaav	Singer	Himself		
2023	Bawli	Singer	Himself		
2023	Chore Haryana Aale	Singer	Himself		
2024	Illegal Hathiyar	Singer	Himself		
2025	Fire Dabey	Singer	Himself		

== Accolades ==
Year	Award	Event	Result	Ref.
2023	Youth Icon of the Year	BIG Impact Awards — Chandigarh and Haryana Edition	Won	
2024	OTT Star of the Year — Male	Creators United 2.0 (in association with the Government of Maharashtra)	Won	
2026	Best Actor (Debut) — Male	e4m Play Streaming Media Awards (for Aukaat Ke Bahar)	Won	

=== Recognitions ===
- 2023: Elvish became the fifth most searched personality on Google in India.

== See also ==
- List of YouTubers
- List of Indian comedians
