= Karan Kundrra =

Indian actor (born 1984)

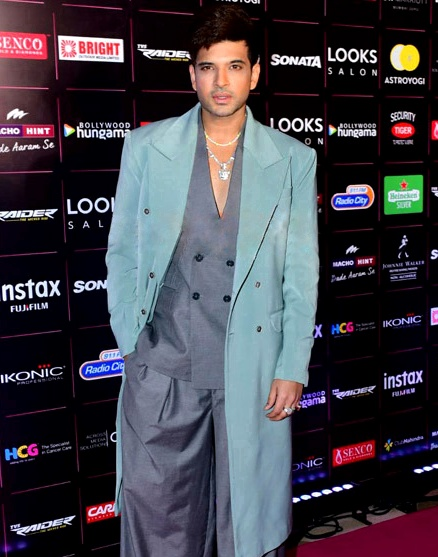
- Kundrra in 2023
- Born: 11 October 1984 (age 42); Jalandhar, Punjab, India
- Occupations: Actor; model; host
- Years active: 2009–present
- Known for: Kitani Mohabbat Hai; MTV Roadies; Bigg Boss 15

Karan Kundrra (born 11 October 1984) is an Indian actor who works in Hindi-language television and films. One of the highest-paid television actors in India, he made his acting debut with Ekta Kapoor's popular television show Kitani Mohabbat Hai (2009).

Kundrra went on to star in several TV shows like Kitani Mohabbat Hai 2, Yeh Kahan Aa Gaye Hum, Dil Hi Toh Hai, Yeh Rishta Kya Kehlata Hai and Tere Ishq Mein Ghayal. He has also hosted reality shows like MTV Roadies, MTV Love School, Dance Deewane Juniors and Temptation Island India, and featured in the Hindi films Mubarakan, 1921 and Tera Kya Hoga Lovely. In 2021, he participated in Bigg Boss 15 and emerged as the 2nd runner-up.

== Career ==
Kundrra made his acting debut in 2009 with the lead role of Arjun Punj in Kitani Mohabbat Hai on NDTV Imagine. In late 2009, he played the lead character of Veeru in Bayttaab Dil Kee Tamanna Hai on Sony TV. After appearing in an episodic role as a ghost prince in Aahat on Sony TV, he participated in the dance reality show Zara Nachke Dikha on Star Plus in May 2010. Later, he played the lead role of Arjun Singhania in Kitani Mohabbat Hai on Imagine TV. He was then seen as a host in the first two seasons of Gumrah – End Of Innocence on Channel V. He played the role of Karan Kapoor in Teri Meri Love Stories on Star Plus. Kundrra was next seen in V The Serial on Channel V in 2012. He was also seen as a gangleader in the reality show Roadies on MTV. He also hosted another reality show Love School on MTV for 3 seasons.

In 2017, he was cast as Manpreet Sandhu in Anees Bazmee's film Mubarakan alongside Arjun Kapoor and Ileana D'Cruz. In 2018, he starred as the lead Ayush Asthana in Vikram Bhatt's horror film 1921. The same year, he made a comeback to television with Ekta Kapoor's romantic drama Dil Hi Toh Hai, which extended for two more seasons on the OTT platform ALTBalaji and mx player 2019 and 2020.

In 2020 Kundrra appeared in ALT balaji web series It happened in Calcutta as the lead character. Ronobir Chatterjee. In April 2021, he played the role of Ranveer Chauhan in Yeh Rishta Kya Kehlata Hai. In October 2021, Kundrra participated in the popular reality show Bigg Boss 15 and emerged as the second runner-up. In March 2022, he was seen as a jailor on the reality show LockUpp which streamed on ALTBalaji and MX Player. In April 2022, Kundrra hosted the dance reality show Dance Deewane Juniors 1 on Colors TV.

In 2023, he was seen portraying Veer, a shape shifting werewolf, in Colors TV’s series Tere Ishq Mein Ghayal.

In 2024, he took part in the reality show called Laughter Chef where his pair with Arjun Bijlani was applauded for their teamwork and performance. In June 2025, he participated as contestant in the Prime Video's The Traitors. He was eliminated on Day 3 and placed 17th.

In December 2025, he joined Colors TV's Naagin 7 where he played Dr. Tushar Sinha. Since January 2026, he also hosted MTV India's MTV Splitsvilla 16.

== Personal life ==
Kundrra is engaged with actress Tejasswi Prakash since 2021. The two (Kundra and Tejaswi) met while working on Ladies vs Gentlemen, and started dating during their stay in the reality show Bigg Boss 15.

== In the media ==
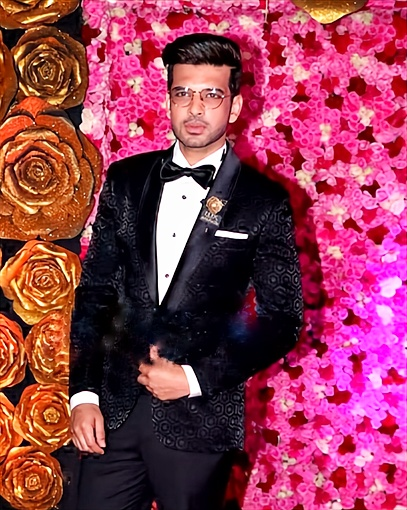
Kundrra in 2018

Kundrra has appeared on Forbes India's Celebrity 100 list twice. He debuted in 2018 at 84th position with an estimated annual income of ₹110.1 million (US$1.1 million). In 2019, he was placed at 92nd position.

Kundrra was the guest of honour at Asia’s largest youth conference in 2013.

== Filmography ==
=== Films ===
Year	Title	Role	Language	Notes	Ref.
2012	Pure Punjabi	Prem	Punjabi		
2013	Horror Story	Neel	Hindi		
2013	Jatt Romantic		Punjabi		
2014	Mere Yaar Kaminey	Ketan	Punjabi		
2015	Control Bhaji Control	Dicky Brar	Punjabi		
2017	Mubarakan	Manpreet Sandhu	Hindi		
2018	1921	Ayush Ashthana	Hindi	Lead Role	
2020	Dolly Kitty Aur Woh Chamakte Sitare	DJ Gurjar Teja	Hindi		
2023	Thank You for Coming	Arjun Malhotra	Hindi		
2024	Tera Kya Hoga Lovely	Gurdeep "Guggu" Dagar	Hindi		
2025	Missing Face	Aryan Mehera	Hindi		

=== Television ===
Year	Title	Role	Notes	Ref.
2009	Kitani Mohabbat Hai	Arjun Punj		
2009–2010	Bayttaab Dil Kee Tamanna Hai	Veeru		
2010	Zara Nachke Dikha 2	Contestant		
2010–2011	Kitani Mohabbat Hai 2	Arjun Singhania		
2012	Teri Meri Love Stories	Karan Kapoor		
2012	V The Serial	Himself		
2012	Gumrah End Of Innocence	Host		
2014	MTV Fanaah	Vivan		
2015–2016	Yeh Kahan Aa Gaye Hum	Rahul Sabarwaal		
2015	MTV Roadies 12	Gang Leader		
2015–2016	Pyaar Tune Kya Kiya	Host		
2016	MTV Roadies 13	Gang Leader	Winner	
2016–2017	MTV Love School 2	Host		
2017	MTV Roadies Rising	Gang Leader		
2018	MTV Love School 3	Host		
2018	Dil Hi Toh Hai	Ritwik Noon	Season 1	
2019	MTV Love School 4	Host		
2021	Yeh Rishta Kya Kehlata Hai	Ranveer Chauhan		
2021–2022	Bigg Boss 15	Contestant	2nd runner-up	
2022	Dance Deewane Juniors	Host		
2023	Tere Ishq Mein Ghayal	Veer Oberoi		
2024	India's Ultimate Motostar	Host		
2024–2026	Laughter Chefs – Unlimited Entertainment (Season 1-3)	Contestant	Season 2 (winner)	
2025	Naagin 7	Dr. Vishal Puri		
2026	MTV Splitsvilla 16	Host		

==== Special appearances ====
Year	Title	Role	Ref.
2013	Jhalak Dikhhla Jaa 6	Himself	
2014	MTV Splitsvilla 7	Himself	
2015	Comedy Nights with Kapil	Himself	
2015	MTV Splitsvilla 8	Himself	
2015	Bigg Boss 9	Himself	
2015	Bad Company	Himself	
2016	Comedy Nights Bachao	Himself	
2018	Ace of Space 1	Himself	
2018	MTV Troll Police	Himself	
2019	Ace of Space 2	Himself	
2019	Nach Baliye 9	Himself	
2019	The Greedy Closet	Himself	
2021	Candid Yaari by Mahreen Khan	Himself	
2022	The Khatra Khatra Show	Himself	
2022	Hunarbaaz: Desh Ki Shaan	Himself	
2023	Entertainment Ki Raat Housefull	Himself	
2023	Bigg Boss 16	Himself	
2023	Bigg Boss 17	Himself	
2024	Bigg Boss 17	Himself	
2024	Playground	Himself	
2024	Dance Deewane 4	Himself	
2024	Bigg Boss 18	Himself	
2025	Celebrity MasterChef	Himself	
2025	Pati Patni Aur Panga – Jodiyon Ka Reality Check (2X)	Himself	
2025	Bigg Boss 19	Himself	
2026	The 50	Himself	
2026	Playground (web series) Season 5	Himself	

=== Web series ===
Year	Title	Role	Notes	Ref.
2019–2020	Dil Hi Toh Hai	Ritwik Noon	Seasons 2 & 3	
2020	It Happened In Calcutta	Ronobir Chatterjee		
2021	Dating Aaj Kal	Host		
2022	Lock Upp	Jailor		
2023	Temptation Island: Pyaar Ki Pariksha	Host		
2024	Love Adhura	Sumit		
2025	The Traitors	Contestant	17th place	
2026	Desi Bling	Himself		

=== Music videos ===
Year	Title	Singer(s)	Ref.
2016	Do Chaar Din	Rahul Vaidya	
2020	Kangna Lede	Aditi Singh Sharma	
2021	Jiss Waqt Tera Chehra	Amit Mishra, Tarannum Malik	
2021	Na Maar	Afsana Khan	
2021	Sukoon	Mannat Noor	
2021	Pind Baluchi	Shahid Mallya	
2022	Rula Deti Hai	Yasser Desai	
2022	Kamle	Akasa Singh, Yasser Desai	
2022	Bechari	Afsana Khan	
2022	Baarish Aayi Hai	Stebin Ben, Shreya Ghoshal	
2022	Akhiyaan	Shekhar Khanijo	
2022	Inni Si Gal	Stebin Ben	

== Awards and nominations ==
Year	Award	Category	Work	Result	Ref.
2009	New Talent Awards	Best Couple Award	Kitani Mohabbat Hai	Won	
2009	New Talent Awards	Style Icon (Male)	—N/a	Won	
2009	Indian Telly Awards	Fresh New Face – Male	Kitani Mohabbat Hai	Nominated	
2015	Indian Telly Awards	Best Anchor	Gumrah: End of Innocence	Nominated	
2023	Iconic Gold Awards	Most Popular TV Actor of the Year	—N/a	Won	
2023	Bollywood Hungama Style Icons	Most Stylish TV Actor – Male	—N/a	Won	
2024	Bollywood Hungama Style Icons	Most Stylish TV Actor – Male	—N/a	Nominated	
2025	Indian Telly Awards	Editor's Choice: Most Versatile Performer on Television - Male	—N/a	Won	

== See also ==
- List of Hindi film actors
- List of Hindi television actors
