= Dating Aaj Kal =

Indian Hindi-language dating reality show

- Show poster
- Genre: Game show
- Created by: Sol Production Pvt Ltd
- Written by: Juhi Goklani
- Directed by: Saahil Chhabria
- Starring: Karan Kundra
- Country of origin: India
- Original language: Hindi
- No. of seasons: 1
- No. of episodes: 30

Production
- Production locations: Mumbai, Maharashtra, India
- Running time: 18 min

Original release
- Release: 13 February 2021

Dating Aaj Kal is an Indian Hindi-language dating reality show hosted by Indian film and television actor and presenter Karan Kundra, who is known for his role as Arjun Punj in Kitani Mohabbat Hai. Aside from hosting, Karan is also seen playing love guru and mentors the girls and boys who are on the lookout for their ideal match. It is a Flipkart Video original interactive dating series which was released on the Flipkart app on 13 February 2021.

== Format ==
Season 1 has 30 daily episodes. The show takes viewers on a journey wherein every three episodes, one female participant interacts with five male candidates. Over the course of 30 episodes, each of the boys will be seen going through five competitive rounds, trying to win over the girl's heart. The first round called Voice Note allows the girl a chance to rank the five boys on a scale of ten on the basis of their 30-second introduction. In the second round, the girl gets introduced to the boys behind the voice and given 10-seconds to pick the ones who make it to the following round. The third round called Speed Dating, where each boy gets an opportunity to have a chat with the girl while ensuring she is still interested in him. This is followed by a Group Date, where host Karan reveals girl the secrets of each boy and the manner in which they tackle these revelations decide who makes it to the last round, The Final Date.

== Cast ==
- Karan Kundra as Host
- Anchor Anupam Anand as Contestant and Winner
- Haji Mohammed as Contestant
- Arjun Verma - Celebrity Makeup Artist as Contestant

== Production ==
On 21 December 2020, Karan announced the show by sharing a video on social media, in which he is seen talking about the show and audition process.

The online audition of Dating Aaj Kal started on 22 December 2020 and closed on 5 January 2021, where participants need to record a one-minute video on what they are searching for in their partners and upload it to the Flipkart app.

The show was officially announced with a teaser trailer on Flipkart Video's official YouTube channel on 4 February 2021, followed by a promo which was released on 9 February 2021. The second promo was unveiled on 13 February 2021.

== Release ==
Dating Aaj Kal is an original show of Flipkart Video and was released on the Flipkart app on 13 February 2021.
