= Tera Kya Hoga Lovely =

2024 Indian film by Balwinder Singh Janjua

- Theatrical release poster
- Directed by: Balwinder Singh Janjua
- Written by: Balwinder Singh Janjua; Rupinder Chahal; Anil Rodhan
- Story by: Anil Rodhan; Kunal Mandekar
- Starring: Randeep Hooda; Ileana D'Cruz; Karan Kundrra
- Cinematography: Andre Menezes
- Edited by: Sanyukta Kaza
- Music by: Songs: Amit Trivedi; Score: Ketan Sodha
- Production companies: Sony Pictures International Productions; Movie Tunnel Productions
- Distributed by: Sony Pictures Releasing International
- Release date: 8 March 2024
- Running time: 144 minutes
- Country: India
- Language: Hindi

Tera Kya Hoga Lovely is a 2024 Indian Hindi-language social comedy film directed by Balwinder Singh Janjua and produced by Sony Pictures Films India. The film features Randeep Hooda and Ileana D'Cruz in lead roles. The film revolves around India's obsession with fair skin. The film was theatrically released on 8 March 2024.

== Cast ==
- Randeep Hooda as Inspector Sombir Sangwan
- Ileana D'Cruz as Lovely Singh
- Karan Kundrra as Gurdeep "Guggu" Dagar
- Pavan Malhotra as Hawa Singh, Lovely's father
- Rajendra Gupta as Bhanwar Singh, Lovely's uncle
- Geetika Vidya Ohlyan as Hawaldar Chandrawel
- Rishabh Bhatia as Chandrawel's husband
- Geeta Agarwal Sharma as Renu Kumari, Sombir's mother
- Meghna Malik as Lovely's aunt
- Shruti Panwar as Shakuntala, Lovely's mother
- Sukhwinder Chahal as Dharampal, Lovely's uncle
- Ashima Singh as Lovely's grandmother
- Vishal Dahiya as Billu, Lovely's cousin
- Shivankit Singh Parihar as Lillu, Truck driver
- Ishu Kumar as Sunny
- Naveen Jagbir Sandhu as Bunty
- Divas Haria as Lovely's brother
- Pall Singh as Sandeep
- Varun Sharma as Ved
- Smyra Chhabra as Young Lovely

== Production ==
=== Development ===
The film was initially titled Unfair & Lovely, which was later changed to Tera Kya Hoga Lovely.

=== Filming ===
Principal photography commenced on 29 October 2020 in Haryana. Filming concluded on 19 November 2020.

== Reception ==
Dhaval Roy of the Times of India rates 3 out of 5 starts and wrote, "With a shorter runtime, fresher story, and crisper screenplay, Tera Kya Hoga Lovely would have been a more interesting watch. However, it manages to entertain with its lighthearted humor and strong performances."

Fayak Ansari of Amar Ujala rated the film only 1 star out of 5.

== Music ==
Tera Kya Hoga Lovely

Soundtrack album by Amit Trivedi
- Released: 4 March 2024
- Recorded: 2023
- Genre: Feature film soundtrack
- Length: 22:20
- Language: Hindi
- Label: Zee Music Company

Amit Trivedi chronology
Shaitaan (2024)	Tera Kya Hoga Lovely (2024)	Azaad (2025)

Official audio
- Tera Kya Hoga Lovely - Full Album on YouTube

The music of the film is composed by Amit Trivedi with lyrics written by Irshad Kamil.

Track listing
No.	Title	Singer(s)	Length
1.	"Loafer Akhiyaan"	Deesi Madana, Ruchika Chauhan, Nakash Aziz	2:49
2.	"Mann Lovely"	Abhay Jodhpurkar, Madhubanti Bagchi	4:00
3.	"Jugni"	Amit Trivedi	3:24
4.	"Gham Ka Rang"	Deepali Sathe, Shashaa Tirupati	4:43
5.	"Dil Khona"	Yashita, Shahid Mallya	3:26
6.	"Mann Lovely" (Version 2)	Raj Barman, Madhubanti Bagchi	3:58
Total length:			22:20
