= Mann Kasturi Re =

2022 Indian suspense drama film

- Theatrical release poster
- Directed by: Sanket Mane
- Written by: Sanket Mane
- Produced by: Venkat Attili; Mrutyunjay Kichambare; Nisheeta Keni; Karan Konde
- Starring: Abhinay Berde; Tejasswi Prakash; Rajshri Deshpande
- Cinematography: Rohan Madkaikar
- Edited by: Manish Shirke
- Music by: Shorr
- Production companies: Mumbai Movie Studios; Imens Dimension Entertainment; Arts Production
- Release date: 4 November 2022
- Country: India
- Language: Marathi

Mann Kasturi Re is a 2022 Indian Marathi-language suspense romantic drama film written and directed by Sanket Mane and produced by Mumbai Movie Studios, Imens Dimension Entertainment, and Arts Production. It stars Abhinay Berde and Tejasswi Prakash, in her Marathi cinema debut. The film focuses on two very different people—Shruti and Siddhant—who fall in love, subsequently changing the trajectory of their lives.

== Cast ==
- Tejasswi Prakash as Shruti Sarnaik
- Abhinay Berde as Siddhant Sawant
- Rajshri Deshpande as Siddhant's lawyer
- Asit Redij as Shruti's father
- Veena Jamkar as Siddhant's mother
- Vinambra Babhal as Siddhant's friend
- Aakash Mithbavkar as Mohammad
- Kiran Tambe as Shruti's friend
- Aadarsh Swaroop as a prisoner
- Tushar Ghadigaonkar as Siddhant's friend
- Ajit Bhure as Shruti's lawyer

== Release ==
The trailer for Mann Kasturi Re was released on 17 October 2022 on YouTube, and the film came out in theatres on 4 November 2022.

== Reception ==
Mann Kasturi Re received mixed reviews from critics. Harshada Bhirvandekar of Hindustan Times rated it 2.5 out of five and wrote, "The first half of the film seems a bit boring. However, it is successful at keeping the audience hooked in the second half".

Vinit Vaidya of ABP Majha gave it a rating of 2.5 and wrote, "The movie has a star cast in the lead role, and audiences will get to see a lot of suspense and twists in this movie. The background score, cinematography, and art department have done a great job. When the core of the movie includes various entanglements, the ending can expected to be a mystery, but it turns out to be disappointing".

Shruti Shrivastava of DNP India wrote, "The film has an average storyline, and you will be disappointed if you are hoping for a fresh story. It can be sluggish at times as the story becomes predictable".
