= Playground (Indian TV series) season 4 =

Indian reality show

Playground
- Season 4
- Presented by: Shreya Kalra; Yuvraj Dua; Rohit Varghese
- Judges: Elvish Yadav; Munawar Faruqui; Naman Mathur; Mithilesh Patankar; Uorfi Javed
- No. of days: 42
- No. of housemates: 22
- Winner: Gaurav Singh
- Runner-up: Vanshaj Singh Mehta
- No. of episodes: 45

Release
- Original network: Amazon MX Player
- Original release: 29 September – 9 November 2024

Playground Season 4 was the fourth season of the Indian reality web series Playground. It premiered on 29 September 2024 on Amazon MX Player.

The season was won by Gaurav Singh, also known as BT Android from the KO Krakens, with Vanshaj Singh Mehta from the AAA Werewolves finishing as the runner-up, and Armaan Syed from the Power Phoenixes being awarded the season's Most Valuable Player (MVP).

== Hosts ==
Hosts	Shreya Kalra	Casters	Valence Kundra	Game Master	Jaideep "JD" Sood
Hosts	Yogesh Dua	Casters	Valence Kundra	Game Master	Jaideep "JD" Sood
Hosts	Rohit Varghese	Casters	Mannu "Krat" Karki	Game Master	Jaideep "JD" Sood

== Contestants ==
Contestant		Status	Place
	Gaurav "BT Android" Singh	Winner	1st
	Vanshaj Singh Mehta	Runner-up	2nd
1	Armaan Syed	Eliminated	3rd
1	Armaan Syed	MVP	3rd
	Mohit	Eliminated	4th
	Vaibhav Dixit	Eliminated	5th
	Shobhika Bali	Eliminated	6th
2	Shobhika Bali	Eliminated	6th
3	Khyati Sharma	Eliminated	7th
3	Diya Bihani	Eliminated	8th
4	Ginni Pandey	Eliminated	9th
5	Unnati Patwal	Eliminated	10th
5	Aryansh Kundra	Eliminated	11th
	Himanshu Arora	Eliminated	12th
	Himanshu Arora	Eliminated	12th
	Nitin Gupta	Eliminated	13th
	Farhan Khan	Eliminated	14th
	Pankaj Rawat	Eliminated	15th
1	Gauri G Singh	Walked	16th
	Vaibhav "Charlie" Veer	Eliminated	17th
	Pragya "Winter" Verma	Eliminated	18th
	Vipul Singh	Eliminated	19th
	Riya Pandey	Eliminated	20th
	Pragya Pandey	Eliminated	21st
	Bharat Madaan	Walked	22nd

The numbers 1, 2, 3, 4 and 5 in the chart represent the teams in which the contestants were originally in before the swapping (i.e, 1 - OP Unicorns, 2 AAA Werewolves, 3 - KO Krakens, 4 - Raging Centaurs & 5 - Power Phoenixes).

Color Keys

KO Krakens
Power Phoenixes
OP Unicorns
Raging Centaurs
AAA Werewolves

== Season summary ==
=== Leaderboard ===
Team	Mentor	Team Leaderboard	Contestants	Player Leaderboard	Gaming Leaderboard	Notes	Status
KO Krakens	Elvish Yadav	11.99M	Vipul Singh	480K	120	None	Eliminated (Episode 11)
KO Krakens	Elvish Yadav	11.99M	Diya Bihani	Swapped; Gauri G. OP Unicorns (Episode 32)			
KO Krakens	Elvish Yadav	11.99M	Bharat Madaan	00	—N/a	None	Injured; Walked (Episode 7)
KO Krakens	Elvish Yadav	11.99M	Khyati Sharma	Swapped; Unnati P. Power Phoenixes (Episode 32)			
KO Krakens	Elvish Yadav	11.99M	Vaibhav "Charlie" Veer	1.92M	325	Wildcard^{1} (Episode 12)	Eliminated (Episode 23)
KO Krakens	Elvish Yadav	11.99M	Nitin Gupta	3.98M	375	Wildcard^{1} (Episode 13)	Eliminated (Episode 39)
KO Krakens	Elvish Yadav	11.99M	Unnati Patwal	2.56M	570	None	Eliminated (Episode 44)
KO Krakens	Elvish Yadav	11.99M	Gauri G Singh	2.14M^{3}	245	None	Injured; Walked (Episode 33)
KO Krakens	Elvish Yadav	11.99M	Gaurav "BT Android" Singh	4.00M	640	Wildcard (Episode 33)	Winner (Episode 45)
KO Krakens	Elvish Yadav	11.99M	Gaurav "BT Android" Singh	4.00M	640	Ticket To Finale Week (Episode 34)	Winner (Episode 45)
KO Krakens	Elvish Yadav	11.99M	Gaurav "BT Android" Singh	4.00M	640	Received Haier QD-MINI LED TV, Techno Pova 6 Neo Phone and ₹10 lakh	Winner (Episode 45)
Power Phoenixes	Munawar Faruqui	11.43M	Shobhika Bali	1.11M	—N/a	None	Eliminated (Episode 23)
Power Phoenixes	Munawar Faruqui	11.43M	Farhan Khan	3.69M	585	None	Eliminated (Episode 39)
Power Phoenixes	Munawar Faruqui	11.43M	Aryansh Kundra	Swapped; Armaan S. OP Unicorns (Episode 32)			
Power Phoenixes	Munawar Faruqui	11.43M	Riya Pandey	448K	65	None	Eliminated (Episode 11)
Power Phoenixes	Munawar Faruqui	11.43M	Unnati Patwal	Wildcard^{1} (Episode 13); Swapped; Khyati S. KO Krakens (Episode 32)			
Power Phoenixes	Munawar Faruqui	11.43M	Armaan Syed	4.54M	1760 (MVP)	Finalist (Top 3); Received ₹1 lakh	Eliminated (Episode 45)
Power Phoenixes	Munawar Faruqui	11.43M	Khyati Sharma	3.17M	—N/a	None	Eliminated (Episode 44)
OP Unicorns	Mortal	12.89M	Gauri G Singh	Swapped; Diya B. KO Krakens (Episode 32)			
OP Unicorns	Mortal	12.89M	Mohit	5.67M	1185	Finalist (Top 5)	Eliminated (Episode 45)
OP Unicorns	Mortal	12.89M	Pragya Pandey	297K	—N/a	None	Eliminated (Episode 11)
OP Unicorns	Mortal	12.89M	Armaan Syed	Swapped; Aryansh K. Power Phoenixes (Episode 32)			
OP Unicorns	Mortal	12.89M	Himanshu Arora	1.25M	230	Wildcard (Episode 18)	Eliminated (Episode 23)
OP Unicorns	Mortal	12.89M	Aryansh Kundra	3.26M	900	None	Eliminated (Episode 42)
OP Unicorns	Mortal	12.89M	Diya Bihani	3.96M	695	None	Eliminated (Episode 44)
Raging Centaurs	Mythpat	11.08M	Vaibhav Dixit	4.08M	820	Finalist (Top 5)	Eliminated (Episode 45)
Raging Centaurs	Mythpat	11.08M	Pragya "Winter" Verma	1.39M	205	None	Eliminated (Episode 23)
Raging Centaurs	Mythpat	11.08M	Pankaj Rawat	2.96M	490	None	Eliminated (Episode 39)
Raging Centaurs	Mythpat	11.08M	Ginni Pandey	Swapped; Shobhika B. AAA Werewolves (Episode 32)			
Raging Centaurs	Mythpat	11.08M	Shobhika Bali	3.70M	—N/a	Finalist (Top 6); Walked; Golden Ball worth ₹5 lakh	Eliminated (Episode 45)
AAA Werewolves^{2}	Uorfi Javed	12.00M	Vanshaj Singh Mehta	5.56M	910	Wildcard^{2} (Episode 25)	Runner-Up (Episode 45)
AAA Werewolves^{2}	Uorfi Javed	12.00M	Vanshaj Singh Mehta	5.56M	910	Finalist (Top 2)	Runner-Up (Episode 45)
AAA Werewolves^{2}	Uorfi Javed	12.00M	Shobhika Bali	Re-entered^{2} (Episode 25); Swapped; Ginni P. Raging Centaurs (Episode 32)			
AAA Werewolves^{2}	Uorfi Javed	12.00M	Himanshu Arora	2.86M	530	Re-entered^{2} (Episode 25)	Eliminated (Episode 39)
AAA Werewolves^{2}	Uorfi Javed	12.00M	Ginni Pandey	2.91M	415	None	Eliminated (Episode 44)

1. Wildcard contestants Charlie, Unnati P. and Nitin G. received 2x powerup card for a week.
2. AAA Werewolves led by mentor Uorfi entered as wildcard. They received 3x powerup card for a week.
3. BT Android replaced Gauri G. and therefore received her earned rumbles upon entering as wildcard.

=== Esports & Presentation Ceremony ===
==== Wooden Spoon Count ====
Team	Match Day	Round	Wooden Spoon	Contestant(s)
Raging Centaurs	Heats 3	Gang Beasts		Vaibhav D.
Raging Centaurs	Match Day 4	Asphalt		Vaibhav D.
Raging Centaurs	Match Day 11	Rubber Bandits		Vaibhav D.
Raging Centaurs	Match Day 14	Valorant		Vaibhav D.
Raging Centaurs	Match Day 15	Pokémon Unite		Pankaj R. Shobhika B.
Raging Centaurs	Championship Day 3	Valorant		Pankaj R.
Raging Centaurs	Match Day 19	Gang Beasts		Vaibhav D.
Raging Centaurs	Match Day 20	Overcooked		Vaibhav D. Shobhika B.
Raging Centaurs	Match Day 21	Asphalt		Vaibhav D.
Raging Centaurs	Match Day 22	Street Fighter		Vaibhav D.
KO Krakens	Heats 1	Naraka		Vipul S.
KO Krakens	Match Day 7	Pokemon Unite		Diya B.
KO Krakens	Championship Day 2	Shadow Fight		Diya B.
KO Krakens	Championship Day 2	Wreckfest		Diya B.
KO Krakens	Match Day 12	Asphalt		Diya B.
KO Krakens	Match Day 13	For Honor		Nitin G.
Power Phoenixes	Heats 2	Shadow Fight		Farhan K.
Power Phoenixes	Championship Day 1	Invrse Cricket		Farhan K.
Power Phoenixes	Match Day 8	Street Fighter		Aryansh K.
Power Phoenixes	Match Day 9	Overcooked		Aryansh K.
OP Unicorns	Match Day 5	Invrse Cricket		Mohit
OP Unicorns	Match Day 17	Shadow Fight		Diya B.
OP Unicorns	Match Day 23	Shadow Fight		Mohit
AAA Werewolves	Match Day 16	Wreckfest		Vanshaj S. Himanshu A.

==== Game Day Win Tally ====
Team	Match Day	Round	Trophy
OP Unicorns	Heats 2	Shadow Fight	
OP Unicorns	Heats 3	Gang Beasts	
OP Unicorns	Match Day 4	Asphalt	
OP Unicorns	Match Day 7	Pokémon Unite	
OP Unicorns	Match Day 8	Street Fighter	
OP Unicorns	Match Day 9	Overcooked	
OP Unicorns	Match Day 11	Rubber Bandits	
OP Unicorns	Match Day 12	Asphalt	
OP Unicorns	Match Day 13	For Honor	
OP Unicorns	Championship Day 3	Valorant	
OP Unicorns	Match Day 21	Asphalt	
Power Phoenixes	Championship Day 2	Shadow Fight	
Power Phoenixes	Championship Day 2	Wreckfest	
Power Phoenixes	Match Day 14	Valorant	
Power Phoenixes	Match Day 15	Pokemon Unite	
Power Phoenixes	Match Day 19	Gang Beasts	
Power Phoenixes	Match Day 22	Street Fighter	
KO Krakens	Match Day 5	Invrse Cricket	
KO Krakens	Match Day 16	Wreckfest	
KO Krakens	Match Day 20	Overcooked	
AAA Werewolves	Match Day 17	Shadow Fight	
AAA Werewolves	Match Day 23	Shadow Fight	
Raging Centaurs	Heats 1	Naraka	

==== Gaming Team Leaderboard ====
Team	Leaderboard
Power Phoenixes	5.57M
KO Krakens	5.43M
OP Unicorns	5.26M
AAA Werewolves	4.37M
Raging Centaurs	1.8M

==== Hero Xtreme MVP Of The Day ====
Team	Contestant	Match Day	Round	Notes
OP Unicorns	Armaan S.	Heats 1	Naraka	None
OP Unicorns	Armaan S.	Heats 2	Shadow Fight	None
OP Unicorns	Armaan S.	Heats 3	Gang Beasts	None
OP Unicorns	Armaan S.	Match Day 4	Asphalt	₹10,000
KO Krakens	Nitin G.	Match Day 5	Invrse Cricket	₹10,000
KO Krakens	Charlie	Championship Day 1	Invrse Cricket	₹10,000
OP Unicorns	Armaan S.	Match Day 7	Pokemon Unite	₹10,000
OP Unicorns	Armaan S.	Match Day 8	Street Fighter	₹10,000
OP Unicorns	Armaan S.	Match Day 9	Overcooked	₹10,000
Power Phoenixes	Aryansh K.	Championship Day 2	Shadow Fight	₹10,000
Power Phoenixes	Aryansh K.	Championship Day 2	Wreckfest	₹10,000
AAA Werewolves	Vanshaj S.	Match Day 11	Rubber Bandits	₹10,000
OP Unicorns	Armaan S.	Match Day 12	Asphalt	₹10,000
OP Unicorns	Armaan S.	Match Day 13	For Honor	₹10,000
Power Phoenixes	Armaan S.	Match Day 14	Valorant	₹10,000
Power Phoenixes	Armaan S.	Match Day 15	Pokémon Unite	₹10,000
KO Krakens	BT Android	Match Day 16	Wreckfest	₹10,000
AAA Werewolves	Vanshaj S.	Match Day 17	Shadow Fight	₹10,000
AAA Werewolves	Vanshaj S.	Championship Day 3	Valorant	₹10,000
Power Phoenixes	Armaan S.	Match Day 19	Gang Beasts	₹10,000
KO Krakens	BT Android	Match Day 20	Overcooked	₹10,000
OP Unicorns	Diya B.	Match Day 21	Asphalt	₹10,000
Power Phoenixes	Armaan S.	Match Day 22	Street Fighter	₹10,000
AAA Werewolves	Vanshaj S.	Match Day 23	Shadow Fight	₹10,000
KO Krakens	BT Android	Grand Finale	Asphalt	₹10,000
KO Krakens	BT Android	Grand Finale	Street Fighter	₹10,000

==== Hero Xtreme Challenger Of The Week ====
Week	Team	Contestant	Match Day
2	OP Unicorns	Armaan S.	Championship Day 1
3	OP Unicorns	Armaan S.	Championship Day 2
4	None		
5	AAA Werewolves	Vanshaj S.	Championship Day 3
6	AAA Werewolves	Vanshaj S.	Grand Finale

==== MAAC Skilled Player Of The Day ====
Team	Contestant	Match Day	Round
Power Phoenixes	Unnati P.	Match Day 5	Invrse Cricket
KO Krakens	Diya B.	Match Day 8	Street Fighter
KO Krakens	Nitin G.	Match Day 9	Overcooked
OP Unicorns	Armaan S.	Match Day 11	Rubber Bandits
AAA Werewolves	Vanshaj S.	Match Day 15	Pokémon Unite
Power Phoenixes	Armaan S.	Match Day 21	Asphalt

==== Techno Gamer Of The Day ====
Team	Contestant	Match Day	Round	Notes
KO Krakens	Nitin G.	Match Day 5	Invrse Cricket	Techno Camon 30 Phone
OP Unicorns	Armaan S.	Match Day 7	Pokemon Unite	Techno Camon 30 Phone
Power Phoenixes	Aryansh K.	Championship Day 2	Shadow Fight	Techno Camon 30 Phone
Power Phoenixes	Aryansh K.	Championship Day 2	Wreckfest	Techno Camon 30 Phone
Power Phoenixes	Armaan S.	Match Day 15	Pokémon Unite	Techno Camon 30 Phone
AAA Werewolves	Vanshaj S.	Match Day 17	Shadow Fight	Techno Camon 30 Phone
Power Phoenixes	Armaan S.	Match Day 19	Gang Beasts	Techno Camon 30 Phone

==== "Top 10" Player Gaming Rumble Leaderboard ====
Team	Contestant	Leaderboard
Power Phoenixes	Armaan S.	2.14M
AAA Werewolves	Vanshaj S.	2.07M
KO Krakens	BT Android	1.79M
KO Krakens	Unnati P.	1.47M
OP Unicorns	Diya B.	1.09M
OP Unicorns	Mohit	1.01M
AAA Werewolves	Ginni P.	832.5K
Power Phoenixes	Khyati S.	660K
Raging Centaurs	Vaibhav D.	340K
Raging Centaurs	Shobhika B.	212.5K

=== Challenges Summary ===
==== Legend ====
Week	Round	Team	Contestant(s)	Notes
1	Dominos	OP Unicorns	Armaan S.	400K; Immunity Shield
1	Dominos	Raging Centaurs	Cancelled	None
1	Dominos	KO Krakens	Cancelled	None
1	Dominos	Power Phoenixes	Farhan K.	100K
1	Carry Bot Activity	Raging Centaurs	Ginni P.	300K
2	Distractions	Raging Centaurs	Vaibhav D.	400K; Immunity Shield
2	Distractions	OP Unicorns	Mohit	300K
2	Distractions	Power Phoenixes	Farhan K.	200K
2	Distractions	KO Krakens	Charlie	100K (x2, Powerup card)
3	Rassi Toh Phasee	Raging Centaurs	Ginni P.	400K; Immunity Shield
3	Rassi Toh Phasee	OP Unicorns	Armaan S.	300K
3	Rassi Toh Phasee	KO Krakens	Diya B.	200K
3	Rassi Toh Phasee	Power Phoenixes	Aryansh K.	100K

==== STAR Power Friday ====
Week	Round	Contestant(s)	Notes
1	Roast Battle	Khyati S.	600K
1	Roast Battle	Gauri G.	300K
1	Roast Battle	Shobhika B.	100K
2	Talent Night	Ginni P.	500K
2	Talent Night	Gauri G. and Pragya V.	250K, 250K
2	Talent Night	Vaibhav V. and Diya B.	250K, 250K
2	Talent Night	Mohit and Pankaj R.	250K, 250K
3	Techno Reel Challenge	Diya B. and Unnati P.	10% of 2M; 100K, 100K
3	Techno Reel Challenge	Khyati S. and Nitin G.	30% of 2M; 300K, 300K
3	Techno Reel Challenge	Farhan K. and Mohit	60% of 2M; 600K, 600K
4	Entertainment Challenge	Mohit	Rap Category; 500K
4	Entertainment Challenge	Shobhika B.	Roast Category; 500K
4	Entertainment Challenge	Nitin G.	Roast Category; 500K
4	Entertainment Challenge	Gauri G., Ginni P. and Pankaj R.	500K

==== Reality Check Highlights ====
Week	Round	Team	Contestant(s)	Notes
1	Street Fighter Showdown	Raging Centaurs	Vaibhav D.	Techno Entertainment Arena access key to shoot a reel with teammates and mentor
2	None			
3	Shadow Fight	AAA Werewolves	Vanshaj S.	Armaan S.'s 300K
The Crazy Awards Ceremony
4	Category	Nominees	Awardee	Notes
4	Ring Master (Manipulative)	Unnati P. Vaibhav D.	Unnati P.	6/15 votes
4	Tu Mera Guu Kha (Useless)	Farhan K. Khyati S.	Farhan K. Khyati S.	None
4	Bail Buddhi	Aryansh K. Nitin G. Pankaj R.	Aryansh K.	7/15 votes
4	Bad Human	Gauri G. Pankaj R. Vaibhav D.	Gauri G.	None
4	Part Time Mentor	None	Mortal	None
4	Elvish Ka Deewana	None	Mythpat	None
4	Overrated	Shobhika B. Ginni P.	Shobhika B.	7/15 votes
4	Kaleshi Kanya	Gauri G. Diya B.	Gauri G.	None
4	Most Serious Mentor	None	Elvish Yadav	None
4	Recycle & Reuse	None	Uorfi Javed	None
4	Gyaan Du	None	Munawar Faruqui	None
4	Gyaan Du	Vaibhav D. Himanshu A.	Vaibhav D.	6/15 votes
5	Treasure Hunt	Raging Centaurs	Pankaj R. Shobhika B. Vaibhav D.	500K

==== Outdoor / Physical Activity Challenge ====
Week	Round	Team	Notes
1	Cart League	Power Phoenixes	1M
1	Cart League	KO Krakens	1M
2	Slippery Basketball	Power Phoenixes	60% of 1.5M, 900K
2	Slippery Basketball	OP Unicorns	30% of 1.5M, 450K
2	Slippery Basketball	Raging Centaurs	10% of 1.5M, 150K
3	Cardzilla Stability	OP Unicorns	500K
3	Cardzilla Stability	KO Krakens	500K
3	Cardzilla Stability	Raging Centaurs	500K
4	Cookie Dunk	KO Krakens	700K
4	Cookie Dunk	AAA Werewolves	600K
4	Cookie Dunk	Power Phoenixes	500K
4	Jab We Balance	KO Krakens	60% of 1.5M, 900K
4	Jab We Balance	Raging Centaurs	30% of 1.5M, 450K
4	Jab We Balance	Power Phoenixes	10% of 1.5M, 150K
4	Pul Banao Rumble Kamao	AAA Werewolves	60% of 1.5M, 900K
4	Pul Banao Rumble Kamao	OP Unicorns	30% of 1.5M, 450K
4	Pul Banao Rumble Kamao	Power Phoenixes	10% of 1.5M, 150K
4	Human Bowling	OP Unicorns	40% of 1.5M, 600K
4	Human Bowling	Raging Centaurs	30% of 1.5M, 450K
4	Human Bowling	AAA Werewolves	20% of 1.5M, 300K
4	Human Bowling	Power Pheonixes	10% of 1.5M, 150K
4	Bomb Pull Out Ludo	KO Krakens	40% of 2M, 800K
4	Bomb Pull Out Ludo	AAA Werewolves	30% of 2M, 600K
4	Bomb Pull Out Ludo	OP Unicorns	20% of 2M, 400K
4	Bomb Pull Out Ludo	Raging Centaurs	10% of 2M, 200K
5	Rope Ka Raja Rope Ki Rani	Power Phoenixes	60% of 1.5M, 900K
5	Rope Ka Raja Rope Ki Rani	KO Krakens	30% of 1.5M, 450K
5	Rope Ka Raja Rope Ki Rani	KO Krakens	BT Android; Ticket To Finale Week, 500K
5	Rope Ka Raja Rope Ki Rani	Raging Centaurs	10% of 1.5M, 150K
5	Battleship	AAA Werewolves	60% of 1.5M, 900K
5	Battleship	AAA Werewolves	Techno Pop 9 5G Phone
5	Battleship	OP Unicorns	30% of 1.5M, 450K
5	Battleship	KO Krakens	10% of 1.5M, 150K
5	Diwali Gullak Ludo	AAA Werewolves	40% of 1M, 400K
5	Diwali Gullak Ludo	Raging Centaurs	30% of 1M, 300K
5	Diwali Gullak Ludo	KO Krakens	20% of 1M, 200K
5	Diwali Gullak Ludo	OP Unicorns	10% of 1M, 100K
6	Dhamaal Chal	KO Krakens	40% of 1M, 400K
6	Dhamaal Chal	Power Phoenixes	-10% of 1M, -100K
6	Dhamaal Chal	Power Phoenixes	+30% of 1M, 300K
6	Dhamaal Chal	AAA Werewolves	-20% of 1M, -200K
6	Dhamaal Chal	AAA Werewolves	+20% of 1M, 200K
6	Dhamaal Chal	Raging Centaurs	-30% of 1M, -300K
6	Dhamaal Chal	Raging Centaurs	+10% of 1M, 100K
6	Dhamaal Chal	OP Unicorns	-40% of 1M, -400K

==== Misc. Challenge ====
Week	Round	Contestant	Notes
2	Sumo Wrestling	Pragya V.	Gauri G.'s 200K
2	Sumo Wrestling	Shobhika B.	Khyati S.'s 200K
2	Sumo Wrestling	Diya B.	Ginni P.'s 200K
2	Arcade's Dushman Jodi	Vaibhav D. & Pankaj R.	Techno Entertainment Arena access to shoot a reel; 150K, 150K
3	Military Miling	Unnati P.	Shobhika B.'s 200K
3	Military Miling	Mohit	Pankaj R.'s 200K
3	Military Miling	Vaibhav D.	Himanshu A.'s 200K
4	Rumble Dangal	Shobhika B.	Khyati S.'s 300K
4	Rumble Dangal	Himanshu A.	Armaan S.'s 300K
4	Rumble Dangal	Farhan K.	Nitin G.'s 300K
4	Rumble Dangal	Unnati P.	Ginni P.'s 300K
5	Ballon Phodo Rumbles Jodo	Vaibhav D.	20% of Himanshu A.'s Rumbles, 640K
5	Ballon Phodo Rumbles Jodo	Unnati P.	20% of Khyati S.'s Rumbles, 592K
5	Ballon Phodo Rumbles Jodo	Shobhika B.	20% of Ginni P.'s Rumbles, 658K
5	Asphalt Legends Unite	Vaibhav D.	Unnati P.'s 300K
6	Jeet Ka Chakravyuh	Vaibhav D.	60% of 1.5M, 900K
6	Jeet Ka Chakravyuh	Vaibhav D.	Finalist
6	Jeet Ka Chakravyuh	Vanshaj S.	30% of 1.5M, 450K
6	Jeet Ka Chakravyuh	Shobhika B.	10% of 1.5M, 150K
6	Baazi Jeet Ki	Armaan S.	Vaibhav D.'s 300K
6	Baazi Jeet Ki	Vanshaj S.	BT Android's 300K
6	Bolti Band Activity	Unnati P.	Mohit's 300K
6	Bolti Band Activity	Shobhika B.	Ginni P.'s 300K
6	Bolti Band Activity	Khyati S.	Diya B.'s 300K

== Kill Zone ==
Team	Contestant											
Team	Week 1	Week 2		Week 3		Week 4	Week 5	Week 6		Grand Finale		
Team	Week 1	Episode 12	Episode 14	Episode 19	Episode 21	Week 4	Week 5	Week 6		Grand Finale		
Raging Centaurs	Vaibhav D. Pragya V. Pankaj R. Ginni P.	Pankaj R.	Ginni P.	Pankaj R. ~~Ginni P.~~; Pragya V.	Vaibhav D.	Vaibhav D. Pankaj R. Ginni P.	Pankaj R.	Safe	Shobhika B. Vaibhav D.	Shobhika B. Vaibhav D.		
Power Phoenixes	Riya P.	Farhan K.	Shobhika B.	~~Farhan K.~~; Shobhika B. Unnati P.		Farhan K. Aryansh K. Unnati P.	~~Khyati S.~~; Farhan K.	Safe	Armaan S. Khyati S.	Armaan S.		
OP Unicorns	~~Mohit~~▲ Pragya P.▼	Gauri G.	Armaan S.	~~Gauri G.~~; Armaan S. Mohit	Himanshu A.	Gauri G. Mohit; Armaan S.	Mohit	Aryansh K.▼ Diya B. Mohit	Diya B. Mohit	Mohit		
KO Krakens	Vipul S. Diya B. ~~Bharat M.~~; Khyati S.	Khyati S.	Charlie	~~Khyati S.~~; Charlie; Nitin G.		Diya B. Khyati S. Nitin G.	~~Unnati P.~~; Nitin G.	Safe	BT Android; Unnati P.	BT Android		
AAA Werewolves	Not In Competition					Immuned	~~Ginni P.~~; Himanshu A.	Safe	Ginni P. Vansahj S.	Vansahj S.		
Notes	(Note: Mohit was swapped with Pragya P. due to having more rumbles.)	(Note: Eliminations were cancelled and were carried forward to the next week.)		(Note: In episode 19, Legends had to swap a contestant for Kill Zone with a non-immune teammate.) (Note: Vaibhav D. and Himanshu A. were directly nominated following a physical fight. Vaibhav D. also received a penalty of 300K rumbles.)		(Note: Team elimination were cancelled, and contestants were swapped among teams.)	(Note: In the Carry Bot Activity, Kill Zone contestants received an offer to swap themselves with a non-immune teammate.)	(Note: Aryansh K. had the fewest rumbles in OP Unicorns and was therefore eliminated mid-week.)		(Note: Finalists had to eliminate a contestant who will walk away with ₹5 lakh.) (Note: Armaan S. from the Power Phoenixes were awarded the season's Most Valuable Player (MVP).)		
Eliminated	Bharat M.	No; Elimination		Pragya V. Shobhika B. Himanshu A. Charlie		No; Elimination	Gauri G.	Aryansh K.	Diya B. Ginni P Khyati S. Unnati P.	Shobhika S.	Vaibhav D.	Armaan S.
Eliminated	Bharat M.	No; Elimination		Pragya V. Shobhika B. Himanshu A. Charlie		No; Elimination	Gauri G.	Aryansh K.	Diya B. Ginni P Khyati S. Unnati P.	Shobhika S.	Vaibhav D.	Vanshaj S.
Eliminated	Riya P. Pragya P. Vipul S.	No; Elimination		Pragya V. Shobhika B. Himanshu A. Charlie		No; Elimination	Pankaj R. Farhan K. Nitin G. Himanshu A.	Aryansh K.	Diya B. Ginni P Khyati S. Unnati P.	Shobhika S.	Mohit	BT Android

== Guest appearances ==
Ep.	Guests	Notes
9	Aashish Solanki	Judge, Star Power Friday Roast Battle
12	Chirag "Pingu" Nagru	Playground S3 winner; To introduce Vaibhav "Charlie" V.
13	Lovekesh Kataria	Special Guest; To introduce Unnati P. and Nitin G.
16	Ritvik Sahore and Gayatri Bhardwaj	Judge, Star Power Friday Talent Night; To promote their web series Highway Love 2
17	Harsh Beniwal	Special Guest; Mentor OP Unicorns
21	Nikki Tamboli	Special Guest
23	Mithilesh Patankar	Judge, Star Power Friday Techno Reel Challenge
30	Lovkesh Kataria and Vishal Pandey	Judge, Star Power Friday Entertainment Challenge
34	Piyush "Spero" Bhatla	Guest Caster, Match Day 15
38	Varun "Super Jhonny" John	Guest Caster, Championship Day 3
40	Varun "Super Jhonny" John	Guest Caster, Match Day 19
43	Naman Mathur	To interact with players; Guest Caster, Match Day 22
44	Ahmad Navaaz	To give unfiltered insights and honest feedback to contestants
Grand Finale	Harsh Gujral	Special Guest
