= Upen Patel =

British actor

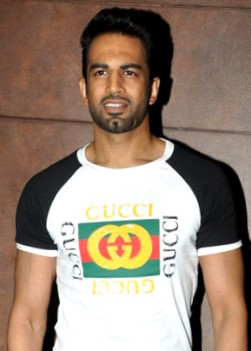
- Patel at the screening of Shubh Mangal Savdhan
- Born: 16 August 1982 (age 43); London, England
- Occupation: Actor
- Years active: 2002–2019
- Known for: I; 36 China Town; Namastey London; Bigg Boss 8; Nach Baliye 7; MTV Love School

Upen Patel (born 16 August 1982) is a British actor who worked predominantly in Hindi films. In addition to working in Hindi films, he has participated in several television reality shows including Bigg Boss 8 and Nach Baliye 7. He also hosted MTV Love School with Karishma Tanna.

== Early and personal life ==
Upen Patel was born on 16 August 1982 to a Gujarati family in London, England. He studied computer science at the University of Hertfordshire. He modelled for fashion designer JJ Valaya at the Lakmé Fashion Week in 2003.

Patel dated actress Karishma Tanna from 2014 to 2016.

== Career ==
In May 2006, Patel made his film debut with 36 China Town, directed by the duo Abbas–Mustan. His next film, Namastey London, was released in March 2007, where Patel played the character of a Pakistani Muslim living in London. In April 2007, his third film Shakalaka Boom Boom was released, which was produced and directed by Suneel Darshan. He also appeared in Money Hai Toh Honey Hai. Patel appeared in the 2008 film, One Two Three. He then appeared in Ajab Prem Ki Ghazab Kahani, released in November 2009. Patel made his Tamil film début with the movie, I, released in January 2015 and directed by S. Shankar.

Patel worked for the weekly cooking show Cook Na Kaho. In March 2005, he was replaced by Shayan Munshi.

Patel was a participant in the daily reality television show, Bigg Boss. NDTV stated that he participated in the show to give his career a boost.

Patel was one of the contestants in Nach Baliye 7 along with Karishma Tanna which is produced by Ekta Kapoor under the banner of Balaji Telefilms. They became one of the finalists.

Patel was judged as the Model of the Year for four consecutive years at the Asia Fashion Award, and was featured among the top 10 sexiest men in Asia for five years running. MTV India awarded him as the most stylish male for two years in a row.

Patel has appeared in several music videos including DJ Suketu's Kya Khoob Lagti Ho in 2005. The music video, with several special effects, was directed and choreographed by Ahmed Khan. It was the most expensive music video of its time shot for a private album.

== Filmography ==
Year	Title	Role	Language	Notes
2006	36 China Town	Rocky	Hindi	
2007	Namastey London	Imran Khan	Hindi	
2007	Shakalaka Boom	Reggie Kapoor	Hindi	
2008	One Two Three	Chandu	Hindi	
2008	Money Hai Toh Honey Hai	Manik Khiralal	Hindi	
2009	Ajab Prem Ki Ghazab Kahani	Rahul Jalan	Hindi	
2015	I	John	Tamil	
2017	Ek Haseena Thi Ek Deewana Tha	Sunny	Hindi	
2019	Boomerang	Sooraj	Tamil	
2019	Chanakya	Sohail / Body Double	Telugu	

=== Television ===
Year	Name	Role	Notes	Ref(s)
2005	Cook Na Kaho	Host		
2014–2015	Bigg Boss 8	Contestant	Entered Day 1, Evicted Day 101	
2015	Nach Baliye 7	Contestant	2nd runner-up	
2015–2016	MTV Love School	Host		
