= School College Ani Life =

2023 Indian Marathi-language film

- Directed by: Vihan Suryavanshi
- Produced by: Rohit Shetty; Pavitra Gandhi; Vivek Shah
- Starring: Karan Parab; Tejasswi Prakash; Jitendra Joshi
- Music by: Pankajj Padghan
- Production companies: Reliance Entertainment; Rohit Shetty Picturez
- Release date: 14 April 2023
- Country: India
- Language: Marathi
- Box office: est.₹1.6 crore

School College Ani Life (transl. School College and Life) is a 2023 Indian Marathi-language romantic film directed by Vihan Suryavanshi and produced by Rohit Shetty, Pavitra Gandhi, and Vivek Shah in association with Reliance Entertainment. It is marked to be Rohit Shetty's debut in Marathi cinema as producer. It stars Karan Parab, Tejasswi Prakash, and Jitendra Joshi. The film was released in theatres on 14 April 2023.

== Cast ==
- Tejasswi Prakash as Indu
- Karan Parab
- Jitendra Joshi

== Plot ==
The story follows the life of young Nirvaan, focusing on the events and experiences that lead to his eventual success. It highlights both the challenges and triumphs he faces, along with the important people who play a role in shaping his journey.

== Release ==
School College Ani Life was theatrically released on 7 April 2023.

== Soundtrack ==
School College Ani Life

Soundtrack album by Pankajj Padghan
- Released: 2023
- Genre: Feature film soundtrack
- Length: 20:10
- Language: Marathi
- Label: Zee Music Company

Official audio
- School College Ani Life - Full Album on YouTube

Track listing
No.	Title	Lyrics	Music	Singer (s)	Length
1.	"Rangbahara"	Valay Mulgund	Pankajj Padghan	Saurabh Salunke	4:10
2.	"Chandanjhula"	Valay Mulgund	Pankajj Padghan	Sayalie Pankaj, Rohit Raut, Mohan Kannan	3:47
3.	"Baware Mann"	Valay Mulgund	Pankajj Padghan	Saurabh Salunke	3:80
4.	"Sugandhi Hawa Jazz Version"	Valay Mulgund	Pankajj Padghan	Neha Adarsh Shinde	1:19
5.	"Sugandhi Hawa Rock Version"	Valay Mulgund	Pankajj Padghan	Rohit Raut	1:60
6.	"Sajana"	Valay Mulgund	Pankajj Padghan	Sayalie Pankaj	2.16
7.	"Chandanjhula (Film Version)"	Valay Mulgund	Pankajj Padghan	Sayalie Pankaj, Rohit Raut	3:78
