= Psycho Saiyaan (TV series) =

2026 Indian television series

- Official Digital Release Poster
- Genre: Romantic Thriller
- Written by: Amitabh Singh Ramkshatra; Suarabh Tewari; Akshay Jhunjhunwala; Ishan Bajpai
- Directed by: Ajay Bhuyan
- Starring: Ravi Kishan; Tejasswi Prakash; Anud Singh Dhaka; Srishti Shrivastava; Surbhi Chandna
- Composers: Shiavam Anuj; Manna Mand
- Country of origin: India
- Original language: Hindi
- No. of seasons: 1
- No. of episodes: 6

Production
- Producers: Sumeet Chaudhary; Kewal Sethi; Hitesh Bhatia; Saurabh Tewari
- Cinematography: Shanu Singh Rajput
- Editors: Jatish Narayan Ghadi; Anurag Singh
- Camera setup: Multi-camera
- Production companies: Parin Multimedia; Freedom One LLP

Original release
- Network: Amazon MX Player
- Release: 25 February 2026 – present

Psycho Saiyaan is a 2026 Indian Hindi-language romantic thriller streaming television series directed by Ajay Bhuyan and produced by Saurabh Tewari under the banner of Parin Multimedia. The series premiered on 25 February 2026 on Amazon MX Player. It stars Tejasswi Prakash, Anud Singh Dhaka and Ravi Kishan in lead roles, with supporting performances by Srishti Shrivastava, Surbhi Chandna and Vaarun Bhagat.

== Synopsis ==
Set in the ancient city of Ujjain, the story follows Kartik, who becomes deeply obsessed with the enigmatic Charu after she arrives in the city seeking mukti for her ailing grandmother. When she suddenly disappears without a trace, Kartik embarks on a determined search for her, gradually realizing that love and devotion may hide far more complicated truths than he imagined.

== Cast ==
- Ravi Kishan as Huntry Singh
- Tejasswi Prakash as Charu Lata
- Anud Singh Dhaka as Kartik Pandey
- Surbhi Chandna as Rucha Sanyal
- Srishti Shrivastava as Ritu Dixit
- Vaarun Bhagat as Bunty Chauhan
- Ashwini Kalsekar as Ratna Singh
- Navninder Behl as Charus's Dadi
- Jagat Rawat as Govind Ram Pandey
- Vijay Shrivastav as Pappu Pandey
- Bhupendar Singh as Raja Singh
- Abhilash Chaudhary as Jeetu
- Devaang Bagga as Manga
- Ashish Bhatt as Indori
- Yashpal Sharma as Kartik's Lawyer

== Episodes ==
=== Season 1 ===
Series	Episodes	Originally released
1	6	25 February 2025

No. overall	No. in season	Title	Directed by	Original release date
1	1	"Siberain Seagull"	Ajay Bhuyan	25 February 2026
2	2	"German Shephard"	Ajay Bhuyan	25 February 2026
3	3	"Persian Cat"	Ajay Bhuyan	25 February 2026
4	4	"Raging Bull"	Ajay Bhuyan	25 February 2026
5	5	"Rowdy Rodent"	Ajay Bhuyan	25 February 2026
6	6	"Wild Wolf"	Ajay Bhuyan	25 February 2026

== Release ==
The series primeired on 25 February 2026 on Amazon MX Player.

== Reception ==
Archika Khurana of Times of India gave 3 stars out of 5 and said that "Psycho Saiyaan thrives on its central idea: “I love you and you love me — baaki sab characters hain.” It remains engaging, intense and intermittently gripping, even if not consistently unpredictable. While the series isn’t without flaws, its strong performances and unconventional premise make this tale of psychotic obsession a fairly compelling thriller worth a watch." Deepa Gahlot of Rediff.com rated it 1.5/5 stars and writes that "Every lead character is nuts in Psycho Saiyaan."

Arpita Sarkar of OTT Play rated it 1/5 stars and writes that "There were high expectations from Tejasswi Prakash’s OTT debut, but she fails to impress, turning this romantic-thriller into a disappointing saga." Koimoi's Trisha Gaur gave half stars out of 5 and "Ravi Kishan and Tejasswi Prakash's Psycho Saiyaan follows the footsteps of Taapsee Pannu's Hasseen Dillruba but loses the path."

Shruti Sampat of Mid-Day stated that "Psycho Saiyaan is a missed opportunity. A taut psychological drama needs a taut script, but this film delivers neither tension nor coherence. For viewers hoping for an engaging thriller, what they will find instead is a disjointed and disappointing watch. A muddled narrative and underwhelming execution make Psycho Saiyaan a forgettable thriller despite its promising cast." Amit Bhatia of ABP News gave 3.5 stars out of 5 and said that "Overall, Psycho Saiyaan is a compelling blend of suspense, thrill, romance, and obsession. Its engaging storyline, strong performances, and unpredictable twists make it a powerful and gripping web series."
