= Temptation Island India =

Indian dating reality television series

- Genre: Reality; Dating game show
- Presented by: Karan Kundrra; Mouni Roy
- Country of origin: India
- Original language: Hindi
- No. of seasons: 1
- No. of episodes: 42

Production
- Producer: Deepak Dhar
- Production location: Alibaug
- Running time: 60 minutes
- Production company: Banijay Asia

Original release
- Network: JioCinema
- Release: 3 November – 14 December 2023

Temptation Island India: Pyaar Ki Pariksha (transl. Temptation Island India: Test of Love) is an Indian reality dating game show based on Temptation Island premiered on JioCinema. Produced by Deepak Dhar under Banijay Asia, the series is filmed in Alibaug, Maharashtra and is hosted by Karan Kundrra and Mouni Roy. In the show, several couples agree to live with a group of singles of the opposite sex, in order to test the strength of their relationships.

== Series overview ==
Series	Episodes	Originally released	
Series	Episodes	First released	Last released
1	42	3 November 2023	14 December 2023

== Contestants ==
=== Season 1 ===
#	Couple	Age	Occupation	Hometown	Dating	Status	Notes
1	Chetna Pande	33	Actress	Nainital	3 years	Engaged in 2026	Left the island alone.
1	Nishank Swami	37	Director	Mumbai	3 years	Engaged in 2026	Chetna declined; Left the island alone.
2	Nidhi Kumar	28	Dancer	Dubai	2 years	Married	Left the island together.
2	Mohak Malhotra	34	Businessman	London	2 years	Married	Left the island together.
3	Nikita Bhamidipati	22	Reality Show Alumni	Mumbai	4 months	Split	They ended their relationship mid-journey. Hence, In episode 25, during special bonefire they had to leave the island.
3	Tayne Devilliers	22	Boxer	South Africa	4 months	Split	They ended their relationship mid-journey. Hence, In episode 25, during special bonefire they had to leave the island.
4	Cheshta Bhagat	33	Actress	Delhi	11 years	Split, Later Nikhil and Cheshta broke up as Chestha found out Nikhil already has a girlfriend	Left the island with Nikhil.
4	Arjun Aneja	36	Actor	Gurgaon	11 years	Split, Later Nikhil and Cheshta broke up as Chestha found out Nikhil already has a girlfriend	Cheshta declined; Left the island alone.
*	Gargee Nandy	26	Model	Shillong	11 years	In a relationship	Left the island alone.
*	Ronak Gupta	29	Businessman	Shillong	11 years	In a relationship	Gargee declined; Left the island alone.

#	Tempter	Age	Occupation	Hometown	Status
1	Satyam Tyagi	26	Lawyer	Delhi	Eliminated (Episode 14)
2	Aryan Arora	25	Actor	Mumbai	Eliminated (Episode 39)
3	Faiz Baloch	25	Social Media Influencer	Mumbai	Eliminated (Episode 39)
4	Samadh Choudhary	30	Sales Professional	Jammu	Eliminated In Finale (Episode 41)
5	Zen Sajnani	22	Software Engineer	Mumbai	Eliminated (Episode 39)
6	Vaibhav "Jimmy" Gandhi	23	Content Creator	Gurgaon	Eliminated (Episode 39)
7	Nikhil Mehta	32	Music Producer / DJ	Chandigarh	Left the island with Cheshta.
8	Jad Hadid	37	Model	Dubai	Eliminated (Episode 39)
*	Akshay Bindra	35	Fitness Trainer	Delhi	Eliminated In Finale (Episode 42)

#	Temptress	Age	Occupation	Hometown	Status
1	Rajvi Brahmbhatt	21	Model	Surat	Eliminated (Episode 40)
2	Shraddha Tiwari	24	Flight Attendant	Bilaspur	Eliminated In Finale (Episode 42)
3	Navisha Raj Kashyap	25	Model	Kolhapur	Eliminated In Finale (Episode 41)
4	Urvi Shetty	28	Model	Mumbai	Eliminated In Finale (Episode 41)
5	Shagun Daggar	21	Beauty Pageant	Indore	Eliminated (Episode 21)
6	Mahima Seth	23	Content Creator	Delhi	Eliminated (Episode 40)
7	Neha Anand	32	Commercial Pilot	Mumbai	Eliminated (Episode 40)
8	Ruma Sharma	28	Social Media Influencer	Delhi	Eliminated (Episode 40)

== Production ==
=== Broadcast ===
Viewers had access to 24×7 live footage at The Temptation Channel & to chats of some contestants at Temptation Island India: Leaked Chats on JioCinema along with daily episodes.

=== Casting ===
In July 2021, Kangana Ranaut was in talks to host the series.

In September 2023, Akash Choudhary was approached to participate in the series, but he declined.

In October 2023, Mouni Roy and Karan Kundrra joined as host.

In few episodes, Abhishek Malhan entered the villa to interact with contestants. Elvish Yadav also entered the villa to interact with contestants.

=== Development ===
In December 2022, it was reported that Banijay Asia was planning to launch the Indian adaption.

In March 2023, Deepak Dhar stated that the development of the series was in its early stages. In July 2023, Banijay Asia confirmed production of the series.

The series was announced by JioCinema on 6 October 2023.

== Reception ==
Satish Sundaresan of OTT Play called the first episode "not at all worth the hype which had been built about the show since many days." He also wrote that the show "seems to be heavily inspired by MTV Splitsvilla."
