= Playground (Indian TV series) =

Indian Hindi-language reality web series

- Genre: Reality; Gaming
- Presented by: Mahvash (Season 1); Rohit Varghese (Season 1-5); Benafsha Soonawalla (Season 1-2); Jaideep Sood (Season 1-4); Umang Jain (Season 2); Ocean Sharma (Season 2); Tanvi Shah (Season 2); Shreya Kalra (Season 3-4); Yuvraj Dua (Season 3-4); Bhavya Singh (Season 5)
- Country of origin: India
- Original language: Hindi
- No. of seasons: 5
- No. of episodes: 192

Production
- Production location: New Delhi
- Camera setup: Multi-camera
- Running time: 34-65 minutes
- Production company: Rusk Media

Original release
- Network: Amazon miniTV; MX Player; YouTube
- Release: 23 May 2022 – present

Playground is an Indian Hindi-language reality web series, primarily available on Amazon miniTV. Premiered in May 2022, Playground series blends entertainment, live gaming, and esports.

Rusk Media claimed that the show had garnered 200 million+ views following the first season.

== Concept ==
The series follows "players" competing in teams under the mentorship of leading gaming influencers and content creators. It involves a group of contestants who participate in various online games, competing individually and in teams, with eliminations based on performance, challenges and voting.

== Season overview ==
| Series | Episodes | Originally released | |
| Series | Episodes | First released | Last released |
|---|---|---|---|
| 1 | 28 | 24 May 2022 | 20 June 2022 |
| 2 | 28 | 30 January 2023 | 26 February 2023 |
| 3 | 45 | 17 March 2024 | 27 April 2024 |
| 4 | 45 | 29 September 2024 | 9 November 2024 |
| 5 | 46 | 1 August 2026 | 13 September 2026 |

== Teams ==
| | Season 1 | Season 2 | Exhibition Cup | Champions League | Season 3 | Season 4 | Season 5 |
|---|---|---|---|---|---|---|---|
| Dare Dragons | Ajey Nagar (CarryMinati) | Ajey Nagar (CarryMinati) | Heet Nandaniya (CarryMinati) | Ajey Nagar (CarryMinati) | Ajey Nagar (CarryMinati) | | |
| AAA Werewolves | Nischay Malhan (Triggered Insaan) | Nischay Malhan (Triggered Insaan) | Nischay Malhan (Triggered Insaan) | Nischay Malhan (Triggered Insaan) | Abhishek Malhan^{1} (Fukra Insaan) | Uorfi Javed^{1} | |
| OP Unicorns | Tanmay Singh (ScoutOP) | Tanmay Singh (ScoutOP) | Tanmay Singh (ScoutOP) | Tanmay Singh (ScoutOP) | Naman Mathur (MortaL) | Naman Mathur (MortaL) | |
| Power Phoenixes | Naman Mathur (MortaL) | Harsh Beniwal | Harsh Beniwal | Harsh Beniwal | | Munawar Faruqui | Aarush Bhola |
| KO Krakens | | Ashish Chanchlani | Ashish Chanchlani | Ashish Chanchlani | Elvish Yadav | Elvish Yadav | Elvish Yadav |
| Raging Centaurs | | | Naman Mathur (MortaL) | Naman Mathur (MortaL) | Ujjwal Chaurasia (Techno Gamerz) | Mithilesh Patankar (Mythpat) | Tejasswi Prakash |

1. In seasons 3 and 4, AAA Werewolves entered mid-season.

== Accolades ==
| Award | Year | Season | Category | Result | Ref(s) |
|---|---|---|---|---|---|
| Filmfare OTT Awards | 2023 | Season 2 | Best Non – Fiction Original (Series) | Nominated | |

== See also ==
- Esports in India
