= List of Bigg Boss (Hindi TV series) controversies =

Bigg Boss is a television reality show broadcast on Colors TV in India. It follows the Big Brother format, which was first developed by Endemol in the Netherlands. Within a span of 19 years of telecast, Bigg Boss has rolled out nineteen seasons, one spin-off season and three OTT version.

== Season 2 ==
- Rahul Mahajan made headlines when he broke the rules of the show and escaped over the house by jumping over the wall.

== Season 3 ==
- Contestant Kamal Rashid Khan had caused ruckus inside the house which lead to a controversial exit by makers after he threw a bottle at Rohit Verma which hit Shamita Shetty.

== Season 4 ==
- TV actors Sara Khan and Ali Merchant were paid Rs. 50 lakh to get married on the show. The wedding was considered forbidden in Islam, because Sara Khan and Ali Merchant were already married. Ali Merchant's mother, Salma, however, said Muslim law permitted the same couple to remarry as many times as they wished to.
- Pakistani actress Veena Malik was involved in physical relationship with Ashmit Patel.
- During the first week of the show's airing, activists of Shiv Sena, a political party, started protesting against the inclusion of Pakistani housemates in the show. After being evicted from the house, Rahul Bhatt claimed that Bigg Boss is scripted. In November 2010, the Information and Broadcasting Ministry served a notice on Colors, due to complaints of indecent exposure aired on national television, asking the channel to change the timings of the show from 9:00 pm to 11:30 pm. The channel later got a stay order from Bombay High Court allowing them to continue the telecast of the show during prime time.

== Season 5 ==
- Akashdeep Saigal had a fight with Mahek Chahal in which he threatened to bring out Mahek's personal life. When Salman Khan scolded him for the fight, he accused Salman of hitting him and causing him emotional hurt during his time on the show. After the show ended, he again accused Salman saying that he destroyed his career.

== Season 6 ==
- Imam Siddiqui stated that host Salman Khan owed him money. He also removed his clothes after a midnight fight with his co-contestants.

== Season 7 ==
- Armaan Kohli was arrested from the set of the show when a complaint filed by British singer-actress Sofia Hayat for allegedly assaulting her during their stay in the show.
- Kushal Tandon and Tanisha Mukherjee got into a nasty fight during a task after Tanisha pushed Kushal and Kushal body shamed and said nasty stuff to Tanisha. Kushal further climbed the roof and escaped the house after the incident. On the weekend, host Salman Khan was caught favoring Tanisha instead of Kushal despite her unarguably violent behavior and Khan supported all of Mukherjee's wrongdoings due to her Bollywood connections.
- Kushal Tandon got physically violent with VJ Andy after Andy made nasty comments on Gauahar Khan and was ejected from the house. Gauahar, too, had exited the house with Kushal after she accused Bigg Boss for being unfair towards Kushal but later re-entered the house.

== Season 8 ==
- Karishma Tanna had a big fight with Gautam Gulati after he abused her during the Hijack task in the second week. And Gautam Gulati said one of the most trending dialogue till date i.e "Bigg Boss Mujhe Hurt Ho Raha Hai". Post Fight led to the whole house turning against Gautam.
- In November 2014, on Gautam Gulati's birthday, Diandra Soares took him into the bathroom which lead to speculations in the house. After Diandra's eviction, there was another controversial topic after reports started saying she was pregnant when she reportedly went to the hospital but she denied all of the rumours.
- Ali Quli Mirza tried to escape from the house by climbing up the rooftop after he was slapped by Sonali Raut for passing inappropriate remarks.

== Season 9 ==
- Kishwer Merchant spat into Rishabh Sinha's water and food including Keith.
- During a task, contestant Rishabh Sinha made Kishwer Merchant walk like a dog for three hours.

== Season 10 ==
- Priyanka Jagga, after disrespecting Salman Khan on a Weekend Ka War episode and saying nasty things to Lopamudra Raut and Manu Punjabi's late mother, got kicked out by host Salman Khan.
- Contestant Swami Om threw his urine on co-contestants Bani J and Rohan Mehra during a task and was ejected. He had had several exits before on the show but later came back.
- The fight between Bani J and Lopamudra Raut got ugly after the BB Call Centre Task which lead to Bani trying to strangle Lopamudra's neck.

== Season 11 ==
- Zubair Khan attempted suicide to get out of the show and was hospitalized for consuming pills after host Salman Khan blasted him for using abusive language against women of the house. He claimed that Salman Khan threatened him that he would not be able to work in the industry anymore after he leaves the house. Host Salman Khan called him 'dog' on the telecast episode. Later Salman Khan sarcastically apologized by saying, "I really need to apologize... I am really sorry to all the dogs of this world".

== Season 12 ==
- During the captaincy task which named "Breaking News", Deepak Thakur, to create news, said demeaning things about Megha Dhade and passed lewd comments on her character. Upon hearing all the things about herself, in a fit of anger, she hurled a shoe and spat on him.

== Season 13 ==
- Rashami Desai's rumoured boyfriend Arhaan Khan was revealed to have a child on national television. He had kept this a secret from Rashami and was exposed by Salman Khan.
- Rashami Desai threw tea on Sidharth Shukla during a Weekend Ka Vaar episode when Sidharth was constantly referring to Rashami as "aisi ladki". Salman had seen the fight live and he bashed both Rashami and Sidharth for their behavior.
- Vishal Aditya Singh and Madhurima Tuli had got into a fight on the show after which Madhurima was seen hitting Vishal with a frying pan. This led to Madhurima being ejected from the show for physical violence. However, unlike prior cases of physical violence in the Bigg Boss house, she was not ejected immediately and was instead ejected on the Weekend Ka Vaar episode.

== Season 14 ==
- On Day 63, the heated arguments started between Rubina Dilaik and Kavita Kaushik got ugly when Kavita told to Rubina that she knew her husband's truth. Rubina told her to speak the truth if she had guts whereas Kavita threatened to slap her. Both asked each other to shut up and Kavita walked out of the house.
- On Day 72, after heated argument for a week, Vikas Gupta pushed Arshi Khan into the swimming pool after she abused his mother. Vikas was ejected from the house, but later re-entered the house.
- On Day 103, arguments started between Rubina Dilaik and Sonali Phogat after Sonali started abusing Rubina and Nikki. Sonali also threatened Rubina and Nikki that after she came out of the house she would send her men to teach them lessons.
- On Day 123, argument started between Abhinav Shukla and Rakhi Sawant when Rakhi started verbally bullying Abhinav. Abhinav called Rakhi a nasty woman whereas Rakhi called him tharki. After Rakhi became ferocious with Abhinav, Rubina threw a bucket of soapy water on Rakhi for which she was nominated for the next week as punishment.

== OTT season 1 ==
- Zeeshan Khan was bashed by host Karan Johar following which he suffered from an anxiety attack inside the house.
- On Day 18, Zeeshan Khan was ejected from the House due to physical violence with Pratik Sehajpal. This caused controversy among the viewers and they accused Bigg Boss of partiality as both the housemates were involved in the fight but only one was ejected and the other was kept.

== Season 15 ==
- On Day 4, Pratik Sehajpal broke the bathroom lock while Vidhi Pandya was taking a bath. After the other contestants got to know about that, they all started to fight and mostly everyone supported Vidhi while Pratik refused to apologize for his behaviour and claimed that he didn't do anything wrong.
- On Day 20, Afsana Khan during the Entrance Task got into a verbal fight with Akasa Singh, where she also tore off the latter's shirt, kicked her and made fun for the way she dressed.
- On Day 40, Afsana Khan tried to injure herself with a knife after being denied the entry to the VIP Zone resulting the crew to take her out of the house.
- On Day 74, Abhijit Bichukale, after helping Devoleena Bhattacharjee throughout the task, asked her for a kiss in exchange. Devoleena responds angrily, saying she would never kiss him and warned him not to cross his limits and take advantage of her generosity. Agitated by this, Abhijit threatened to drink Lizol.

== Season 16 ==
- On Day 40, Archana Gautam physically struck Shiv Thakare, injuring him. This led to Archana being ejected from the show. She was later recalled during Ravivaar Ka Vaar because she was provoked with a subject out of the house by Shiv.
- On Day 47, when Tina Datta tripped and injured her ankle, both Shalin Bhanot and MC Stan started helping her out but eventually got into an ugly fight where the two started abusing and MC Stan took a vase and ran towards Shalin to almost hit him with it. This resulted into Stan being nominated for four consecutive weeks.
- On Day 80, during the nomination task, Shalin Bhanot and MC Stan got into a heated argument and started abusing each other. MC Stan even threatened to kidnap and assault Shalin outside the house.
- On Day 87, Archana Gautam got into a fight with Vikkas Manaktala when Vikkas was making tea for himself but Archana forbade him asked him to keep his tea aside. As Vikkas continued doing his work, Archana pulled the utensil being used for making tea and flipped it, which led to hot boiling water getting thrown at Priyanka Chahar Choudhary and Vikkas Manaktala.
- On full of dirty people.
- On Day 110, Tina Datta, during a conversation with Priyanka Chahar Choudhary, revealed that Shalin Bhanot wanted to meet her before coming to the show to form an alliance which she denied and that he had also taken Sajid Khan's name for it and met Gautam Vig before entering the Bigg Boss house. Tina continued saying that Shalin had even asked her for cheap and materialistic things which she couldn't even say on camera.

== OTT season 2 ==
- On Day 12, Akanksha Puri and Jad Hadid kissed each other as they were given a task by some of the housemates. Host Salman Khan was fuming with anger, but he then apologised to the audience and said he is sorry that they have to witness all these things even on a digital platform.
- On Day 14, Jad Hadid angrily shows his naked butt to Bebika Dhurve during a fight. Host Salman Khan got very angry on this matter and bashed Jad for his unruly behaviour. Jad then apologised to the audience for his actions.
- On Day 32, Jiya Shankar mixed handwash in a glass of water to give to Elvish Yadav during his dictatorship task. Host Salman Khan slammed Jiya for her action. Jiya then apologised to Elvish.

== Season 17 ==
- On Day 47, Sunny Arya physically struck Abhishek Kumar, pulling his collar and hurting him. This led to Sunny being ejected from the show.
- On Day 81, Abhishek Kumar slapped Samarth Jurel, hurting him. This led to Abhishek being ejected from the show after the decision taken by captain Ankita Lokhande couple of days later. He was later recalled during Weekend Ka Vaar episode as he was continuously provoked by Samarth and Isha Malviya on his past mental health condition.

== OTT season 3 ==
- On Day 16, Armaan Malik was nominated for the remainder of the season due to his act in physical violence with Vishal Pandey as he passed a comment on Armaan's second wife and co-participant Kritika Malik.

== Season 20 ==
- On Day 4, contestant Qazi Touqeer staged a mental problem to entertain the fellow housemates. Later, in the second week's 'Weekend Ka Vaar' episode, host Salman Khan staged a chest pain problem act to teach Qazi a lesson. This led to the housemates, especially Rhiti Tiwari, hurling abuses at Qazi.
- On Day 17, contestant Rhiti Tiwari used sexual slurs on Uditi Singh in the diss battle task. This led to a huge argument inside the house, and Salman Khan bashed Rhiti for her behaviour.
- On Day 26, contestant Love Gill told Qazi Touqeer to touch every women's housemates feet during a hypnotizing task. Qazi's initial hesitation and subsequent completion led to a huge uproar among the netizens calling the task to be against his religion and humilitaing.
- On Day 38, A confrontation erupted between newly-wildcard contestant Nakul Dhull and Gullu (Kushal Tanwar) after Qazi Toqueer's remarks about ScoutOP sparked and argument. Nakull allegedly pushed Gullu, leading to a physical scuffled in which Nakul tore Gullu's sweater. Mahhi Vij along with other contestants expressed safety concerns. Bigg Boss reprimanded the housemates, and the incident sparked speculation about a possible planned confrontation linked to their alleged outside rivalry and remarks involving ex-winner Elvish Yadav and a Goa Trip.
- On Day 65, Qazi Touqeer, who was wearing women's clothing for fun, accused Manish Goel of touching him inappropriately after Manish lifted and carried him towards the bathroom area. The controversy escalated during the subsequent nomination task, when Qazi brought up the incident in front of the housemates. Manish became emotional and broke down while defending his character, after which Kanika Mann and Love Gill also called out Qazi over his conduct. The incident sparked criticism on social media, particularly after footage showed Qazi telling the cameras and fellow contestant Gullu (Kushal Tanwar) that he was pinching Manish. Several viewers accused Qazi of turning a playful interaction into a serious allegation and attempting to damage Manish's reputation. Manish's team's response to the controversy also attracted attention online.
