= Bigg Boss (Hindi TV series) season 14 =

Indian reality show (2020)

Bigg Boss
- Season 14
- Presented by: Salman Khan
- No. of days: 140
- No. of housemates: 22
- Winner: Rubina Dilaik
- Runner-up: Rahul Vaidya
- No. of episodes: 141

Release
- Original network: Colors TV
- Original release: 3 October 2020 – 21 February 2021

Season chronology
- ← Previous; Season 13 Next → Season 15

Bigg Boss 14, also known as Bigg Boss: Ab Scene Paltega, was the fourteenth season of the Indian reality TV series Bigg Boss. It premiered on 3 October 2020 on Colors TV. Salman Khan hosted the season for the eleventh time. The Grand Finale took place on 21 February 2021 where Rubina Dilaik emerged as the winner and Rahul Vaidya became runner-up.

Apart from the usual hour-long episode, viewers also had access to the direct 24x7 camera footage. The viewers also had access to Before TV on Voot Select where episode was telecast 15 minutes before it was telecast on Colors TV.

== Production ==
=== Teaser ===
The season was delayed for a month due to heavy rain in Mumbai. On 8 August 2020, the makers released the first promo of the season on Colors TV. Due to the COVID-19 pandemic, the promos were shot at Salman Khan's farmhouse. After eight days, a second promo was released on Colors TV. The third promo was released on 29 August 2020. The fourth promo was released on 13 September 2020 revealing the date of 'Grand Premiere'. The 'Grand Finale' aired on 21 February 2021.

=== Eye logo ===
The border of the eye is dark yellow with a red background. Blue or purple electric lines come from the middle of the eye and join with yellow dots which are set on the inner side of the border which are made to appear like a wire. Each dot is connected with three lines that joined the big center iris of blue color with yellow bob.

=== House ===
The show this time had a "Futuristic Theme" and was located in Goregaon. The house had 2 special sections called BB Spa & BB Mall. On Day 17, Another house section was revealed called Red Zone where nominated housemates lived. On Day 37, the Red Zone was closed.

== Housemates status ==
Sr	Housemate	Day entered	Day exited	Status
1	Rubina Dilaik	Day 1	Day 140	Winner
2	Rahul V	Day 1	Day 64	Walked
2	Rahul V	Day 74	Day 140	1st Runner-up
3	Nikki	Day 1	Day 64	Evicted
3	Nikki	Day 71	Day 140	2nd runner-up
4	Aly	Day 30	Day 60	Evicted
4	Aly	Day 71	Day 140	3rd runner-up
5	Rakhi	Day 71	Day 140	Walked with 14 Lakh
6	Eijaz	Day 1	Day 106	Walked
6	Devoleena	Day 106	Day 134	Proxy of Eijaz
7	Abhinav	Day 1	Day 129	Evicted
8	Arshi	Day 64	Day 127	Evicted
9	Vikas	Day 64	Day 72	Ejected
9	Vikas	Day 78	Day 120	Evicted
10	Sonali	Day 74	Day 113	Evicted
11	Jasmin	Day 1	Day 99	Evicted
12	Rahul M	Day 64	Day 92	Evicted
13	Manu	Day 64	Day 85	Evicted
14	Kashmera	Day 64	Day 78	Evicted
15	Kavita	Day 21	Day 63	Walked
16	Pavitra	Day 1	Day 57	Evicted
17	Naina	Day 21	Day 57	Evicted
18	Jaan	Day 1	Day 50	Evicted
19	Shardul	Day 21	Day 43	Evicted
20	Nishant	Day 1	Day 29	Evicted
21	Shehzad	Day 1	Day 19	Evicted by Housemates & Seniors
22	Sara	Day 1	Day 14	Evicted by Seniors

== Housemates ==
=== Original entrants ===
The freshers in the order of appearance and entered in the house are:

- Eijaz Khan – Television and film actor. He is known for his role as Kkavya in Kkavyanjali.
- Nikki Tamboli – Film actress. She worked predominantly in Tamil and Telugu movies.
- Abhinav Shukla – Actor and model. He was part of serials like Ek Hazaaron Mein Meri Behna Hai, Diya Aur Baati Hum, Geet – Hui Sabse Parayi and Silsila Badalte Rishton Ka.
- Rubina Dilaik – Television and film actress. She is known for playing Radhika Purohit in Chotti Bahu and Soumya Singh in Shakti - Astitva Ke Ehsaas Ki.
- Jasmin Bhasin – Television and film actress. She is known for her role as Twinkle Taneja Sarna in Tashan-e-Ishq, Teni Bhanushali in Dil Se Dil Tak and participating in Fear Factor: Khatron Ke Khiladi 9.
- Nishant Singh Malkani – Actor and model. He is known for his role of Anukalp Gandhi in Preet Se Bandhi Ye Dori Ram Milaayi Jodi, Akshat Jindal in Guddan Tumse Na Ho Payega and the films Horror Story, Bezubaan Ishq.
- Shehzad Deol – Model. He was the third runner-up on the first season of MTV Ace of Space in 2018.
- Sara Gurpal – Singer and actress. She became popular after appearing in the song Jean sung by Ranjit Bawa.
- Jaan Kumar Sanu – Musician/singer. He is the son of Bollywood singer Kumar Sanu.
- Pavitra Punia – Television actress. She is known for her role as Geet in Love U Zindagi and participating in MTV Splitsvilla 3.
- Rahul Vaidya – Singer. He participated in Indian Idol and Jo Jeeta Wohi Superstar.

=== Wild card entrants ===
- Kavita Kaushik – Actress, television host and model. Kavita is known for Chandramukhi Chautala in F.I.R and participating in Jhalak Dikhhla Jaa 8.
- Naina Singh – Television actress, model and winner of MTV Splitsvilla 10. She is known for portraying Rhea in Kumkum Bhagya.
- Shardul Pandit – Television actor and radio jockey. He is known as a radio jockey in Radio Mirchi and appearing in the show Kuldeepak.
- Aly Goni – Television actor. He is known for his role Romesh "Romi" Bhalla in Yeh Hai Mohabbatein.
- Sonali Phogat – Politician and actress.She has appeared in Punjabi and Haryanvi music videos. She had acted in Zee TV's Tashan-e-Ishq.

=== Challengers ===
- Vikas Gupta – Producer. Contestant of Season 11.
- Rakhi Sawant – Actress and dancer. Contestant of Season 1.
- Kashmera Shah – Actress. Contestant of Season 1.
- Rahul Mahajan – Political leader. Contestant of Season 2 and Halla Bol.
- Arshi Khan – Model, actress and dancer. Contestant of Season 11.
- Manu Punjabi – Reality TV personality. Contestant of Season 10.

=== Proxy entrants ===
- Devoleena Bhattacharjee – Television actress and contestant of Season 13. She appeared as a replacement for Eijaz Khan, who left the house due to prior commitments.

== Twists ==
This season featured various twists, following are a few of the twists:

=== Seniors ===
The seniors in alphabetical order. The Seniors stayed in the house for 18 days:

- Gauahar Khan – Actress and model, winner of Season 7
- Hina Khan – Actress and model, runner up of Season 11
- Sidharth Shukla – Actor, model and host, winner of Season 13

=== Challengers ===
On Day 66, former Bigg Boss Contestants Rakhi, Arshi, Vikas, Manu, Rahul, and Kashmera entered the show as challengers and became contenders for the trophy.

=== Connection Week ===
In Week 19, Bigg Boss announced that the connections of the housemates will come in support of the contestants and spend a week with them in the Big Boss House. They entered on Day 129 and left on Day 134.

Housemate	Connection Name	Connection
Nikki	Jaan Kumar Sanu	Friend
Rubina	Jyotika Dilaik	Sister
Rahul V	Toshi Sabri	Friend
Rakhi	Vindu Dara Singh	Friend
Aly	Jasmin Bhasin	Girlfriend
Devoleena	Paras Chhabra	Friend
Abhinav	Rahul Mahajan	Friend

=== Housemates allotment ===
Housemate	Week 1			Week 2	Week 3		Week 4			Week 5				Weeks 6–20
Housemate	Day 1	Day 2	Day 8	Day 16	Day 18	Day 19	Day 22	Day 25	Day 27	Day 31	Day 32	Day 35	Day 36	Day 37-141
Housemate	^{[1]}	^{[2]}	^{[3]}	^{[4]}	^{[5]}	^{[6]}	^{[7]}	^{[8]}	^{[9]}	^{[10]}	^{[11]}	^{[12]}		Red Zone Closed
Rubina	Rejected		Selected		Confirmed	Green Zone			Red Zone	Green Zone	Red Zone	Green Zone		Red Zone Closed
Rahul	Selected				Confirmed	Green Zone		Red Zone	Green Zone		Red Zone			Red Zone Closed
Nikki	Selected		Confirmed			Green Zone		Red Zone	Green Zone					Red Zone Closed
Aly	Not in house										Quarantined			Red Zone Closed
Abhinav	Selected				Confirmed	Green Zone								Red Zone Closed
Eijaz	Selected					Red Zone		Green Zone						Red Zone Closed
Jasmin	Selected				Confirmed	Green Zone			Red Zone	Green Zone				Red Zone Closed
Kavita	Not in house						Green Zone		Red Zone					Red Zone Closed
Jaan	Rejected	Selected			Confirmed	Green Zone		Red Zone	Green Zone					Red Zone Closed
Pavitra	Selected					Red Zone			Green Zone					Red Zone Closed
Shardul	Not in house						Green Zone				Red Zone			Red Zone Closed
Naina	Not in house						Green Zone				Red Zone			Red Zone Closed
Nishant	Rejected	Selected			Confirmed	Green Zone			Red Zone					Red Zone Closed
Shehzad	Selected			Not Confirmed										Red Zone Closed
Sara	Rejected	Selected												Red Zone Closed

=== Notes ===
1. The Seniors were given the decision to select or reject the Fresher Housemates. They rejected four were confined to the garden area.
2. The rejected Housemates were given a chance to change their status from Rejected to Selected and will be allowed to enter the House. Rubina didn't perform well in the task and stayed Rejected.
3. *Rubina was allowed by Bigg Boss to change her status from Rejected to Selected, by sacrificing her chance to win immunity. She sacrificed and was allowed to stay in the house. *Nikki was selected as the first Confirmed Housemate by the Seniors.
4. Shehzad was voted out by the Freshers and Seniors and received the status of Not Confirmed.
5. All Fresher housemates and Seniors competed in a task. Team Sidharth lost and therefore, Eijaz and Pavitra were evicted from the house. And Shehzad as the Not Confirmed housemate was also evicted. Everyone else was Confirmed.
6. On Day 18, the Red Zone was revealed to the housemates. And Eijaz and Pavitra moved into the Red Zone.
7. On Day 22, three Wild-Card Freshers entered the Green Zone.
8. After the nominations, the four nominated housemates had to stay in the Red Zone. And as Eijaz was saved he moved to the Green Zone.
9. During the first Tabadla, the four nominees got to choose any one housemate from the Green Zone to replace them in the Red Zone. Then Captain Eijaz had to decide either to swap or stay. He swapped all four housemates.
10. After the Double Eviction process, Jasmin and Rubina moved back to Green Zone while Nishant and Kavita leave the Bigg Boss House.
11. In the Nomination Task, the four housemates moved to the Red Zone and were nominated for eviction. On Day 33, Aly entered a Quarantined Zone and stayed there for a few days.

=== Sultani Akhada ===
The season brought back the segment for the fourth time. Two housemates have to do physical tasks during the weekend ka vaar's with Salman Khan. There are two rounds. In the first round will be a debate between the two housemates and second will be a light wrestling match. Whoever succeeds these two rounds will be the winner and will get a power. It only appeared in weeks 4 and 14.

	Day 29	Day 99
Participants for Sultani Akhada	Jaan; Nishant	Arshi; Rubina
Winner	Nishant	Arshi

== Guest appearances ==
=== Through direct contact ===
Week(s)	Day(s)	Guest(s)	Notes
First Day First Show	Day 0	Radhe Maa	For motivating contestants
Week 1	Day 7	Nimrit Kaur Ahluwalia, Avinesh Rekhi	For motivating contestants
Week 1	Day 7	Badshah	For motivating contestants
Week 3	Day 21	Preeti & Pinky	Navratri Special
Week 3	Day 22	Divya Khosla Kumar	Promotion of song "Teri Aankhon Mein"
Week 3	Day 23	Nora Fatehi and Guru Randhawa	Promotion of song "Nach Meri Rani"
Week 4	Day 29	Shehnaaz Gill	For entertaining and motivating contestants
Week 4	Day 29	Sunidhi Chauhan	For entertaining and motivating contestants
Week 5	Day 36	Remo D'Souza, Punit J Pathak, Shakti Mohan, Salman Yusuff Khan, Sushant Pujari, Rahul Shetty, Abhinav Shekhar	For entertaining and promoting new album
Week 6	Day 38	Farah Khan, Charul Malik, Amit Tyagi	As a judge in the Bigg Boss Adalat
Week 6	Day 39	DJ Chetas, Anu Malik, Neeti Mohan, Shaan, Sachin Sanghvi	For BB Disco Night
Week 6	Day 42	Mona Lisa, Mahima Makwana, Surbhi Jyoti, Sudha Chandran, Surbhi Chandna, Haarsh Limbachiyaa, Garvit Pareek	For Diwali celebration
Week 7	Day 49	Ekta Kapoor, Divyenndu Sharma, Sumeet Vyas	For special task and promotion of ALTBalaji's "Bicchoo Ka Khel"
Week 7	Day 49	Darshan Raval, Heli Daruwala	For promotion of " Main kisi aur ka" Song
Week 8	Day 56	Kamya Punjabi, Devoleena Bhattacharjee, Sandiip Sikcand, Ronnit Biswas	To support their connections
Week 8	Day 56	Tony Kakkar, Neha Kakkar	For promotion of the song "Shona Shona"
Week 9	Day 64	Shruti Sharma	For promotion of Namak Issk Ka
Week 9	Day 64	Krushna Abhishek	To support his wife Kashmera Shah
Week 10	Day 71	Kavita Kaushik	To sort out personal things with Abhinav Shukla
Week 10	Day 71	Ronnit Biswas	To sort out personal things with Abhinav Shukla
Week 11	Day 79	Dhvani Bhanushali	For promotion of the song "Nayan"
Week 12	Day 85	Raveena Tandon	For Salman Khan's special birthday surprise
Week 12	Day 85	Jacqueline Fernandez	For Salman Khan's special birthday surprise
Week 12	Day 85	Shehnaaz Kaur and Siddharth Shukla	For promotion of the Moj app
Week 12	Day 85	Dharmesh	For promotion of the Moj app
Week 12	Day 85	Haarsh Limbachiyaa and Garvit Pareek	For Christmas Day special
Week 13	Day 92	Pankaj Tripathi and Satish Kaushik	For promotion of the movie Kaagaz
Week 13	Day 92	Sunny Leone	As a BB doctor
Week 13	Day 93	Amar Upadhyay, Priyal Mahajan, Aurra Bhatnagar Badoni, Pravisht Mishra, Surbhi Chandna, Sharad Malhotra, Antara Biswas	For entertaining contestant
Week 13	Day 96	Pramila Tamboli (Nikki's Mother)	To meet their family member and for talk time task
Week 13	Day 96	Shilpa Saklani (Abhinav's Friend)	To meet their family member and for talk time task
Week 13	Day 96	Geeta Vaidya (Rahul's Mother)	To meet their family member and for talk time task
Week 13	Day 96	Yashodhra Phogat (Sonali's Daughter)	To meet their family member and for talk time task
Week 13	Day 96	Imran Khan (Eijaz's Brother)	To meet their family member and for talk time task
Week 13	Day 97	Jyotika (Naina) Dilaik (Rubina's Sister)	To meet their family member and for talk time task
Week 13	Day 97	Mr. & Mrs. Bhasin (Jasmin's Parents)	To meet their family member and for talk time task
Week 13	Day 97	Farhan Khan (Arshi's Brother)	To meet their family member and for talk time task
Week 13	Day 97	Rashami Desai (Vikas's Friend)	To meet their family member and for talk time task
Week 14	Day 98	Pavitra Punia	To meet Eijaz Khan
Week 15	Day 105	Harrdy Sandhu and Sargun Mehta	For promotion of the song "Titliaan Warga"
Week 15	Day 105	Tulsi Kumar	For promotion of the song "Tanhaiyaan"
Week 16	Day 113	Kamya Panjabi	Anchor of Patrakaar Parishad
Week 16	Day 113	Raghav Juyal and Haarsh Limbachiyaa	For entertaining contestants
Week 16	Day 113	Sidharth Shukla	To host the show in Salman’s Absence.
Week 16	Day 113	Tina Datta and Rashami Desai	For celebration of 12 years of Uttaran
Week 17	Day 120	Mouni Roy	To playing games with contestant
Week 18	Day 127	Disha Patani and Randeep Hooda	To promote Radhe
Week 18	Day 127	Harsh Rajput	To Promote Kuch Toh Hai
Week 19	Day 134	Disha Parmar	To accept proposal of Rahul Vaidya
Week 19	Day 134	Gunjan Sinha and Raghav Juyal	For entertaining the contestants
Week 20	Day 136	Abhinav Shukla	For Valentines special date for Rubina Dilaik
Week 20	Day 139	Rajkummar Rao	To promote his film Roohi
Week 20	Day 139	Bharti Singh and Haarsh Limbachiyaa	For special task and were introduced as the first contestants of Bigg Boss 15.
Week 20	Grand Finale	Madhuri Dixit, Dharmesh Yelande, Tushar Kalia, Jamnabai, Sohail Khan	To promote season 3 of Dance Deewane
Week 20	Grand Finale	Dharmendra	Special appearance
Week 20	Grand Finale	Nora Fatehi	Special appearance
Week 20	Grand Finale	Riteish Deshmukh	To conduct the eviction
Week 20	Grand Finale	Avinesh Rekhi, Nimrit Kaur Ahluwalia, Kevina Tak, Aurra Bhatnagar Badoni, Pravisht Mishra	Colors family to promote their respective shows airing on Colors TV
Week 20	Grand Finale	Priyanka Chahar Choudhary, Ankit Gupta and Isha Malviya	To promote Udaariyaan
Week 20	Grand Finale	Aditya Redij and Kinjal Dhamecha	To promote Bawara Dil

=== Through video conferencing ===
Week(s)	Day(s)	Guest(s)	Notes
Week 1	Day 8	Hardik Pandya, Krunal Pandya, Ishan Kishan	For motivating contestants
Week 3	Day 22	Karan Patel and Ankita Patel	To support Shardul Pandit
Week 5	Day 36	Kamya Punjabi, Surbhi Chandna, Arti Singh, Vindu Dara Singh	Special guest (celebrity panel)
Week 13	Day 96	Ilham Goni (Aly's Sister)	To meet their family member and for talk time task
Week 13	Day 97	Jaya Sawant (Rakhi's Mother)	To meet their family member and for talk time task
Week 16	Day 113	Eijaz Khan and Pavitra Punia	To meet reporters in BB press conference
Week 20	Day 139	Aly's Parents and Niece	To fulfill Aly Goni's wish

== Weekly summary ==
Week 1	Entrances	On Day 1, Eijaz, Nikki, Abhinav, Rubina, Jasmin, Nishant, Shehzad, Sara, Jaan, Pavitra and Rahul entered the house as a fresher.; Gauahar, Hina and Sidharth also entered the house but as seniors.
Week 1	Twist	On Day 1, seniors had to decide which freshers will be selected and who were going to be rejected; Eijaz, Nikki, Abhinav, Jasmin, Shehzad, Pavitra and Rahul were selected whereas Rubina, Nishant, Sara and Jaan were rejected.; On Day 4, Abhinav was given the option to relinquish his immunity, if he agreed then his wife Rubina would be allowed to erase the rejected status and enter the house, but he declined the offer And Rubina remained a rejected member.; On Day 5, Rubina was asked to erase her rejected status, but she cannot perform the last immunity task of the week. She agreed, and she can now enter the house and can stay as other housemates.; On Day 6, Nikki and Pavitra won the immunity, seniors had to choose any one of them who would be confirmed. They choose Nikki, and she becomes the first confirmed housemate.
Week 1	Nominations	On Day 3, all contestants were nominated for the first week. However, they can gain immunity by winning the immunity tasks.
Week 1	Immunity Task	Entrance Task (Entry Pass): On Day 2, seniors will give tasks to the rejected fresher, and they have to complete them. Rejected freshers have a chance to remove the rejection stamp and enter the house. All rejected fresher should fulfill the tasks, the seniors have to think and give orders which will put rejected freshers in the turmoil. Later, Bigg Boss asked the rejected fresher to mutually decide about which 3 housemates will go inside the house and one who will remain rejected.; Immunity Task (Jewel Thief): On Day 3, there will be two queens who are looking for a king. Gauahar and Hina are the queens of this task, all fresher boys will be in line to become their kings. There are two thrones for the queens and boys will try to win their hearts when queens are happy with a boy then they will give jewels to the boys. But there is a robber who wants to steal the jewels from Hina and Gauahar. All fresher girls will be part of the robber's team. Their lead is Sidharth. Girls will have to steal the jewelry. At a time, 2 girls can steal only. Gauahar and Hina can ask the boys to guard their jewels. At the end of the task, the fresher who has the most jewelry at the end of the task will be the winner and will be safe from the nominations.; Immunity Task (Sid's Island): On Day 4, all girls are competing against each other. The girl who impress Sidharth will win this task. Gauahar and Hina will give the tips to the fresher girls, they can choose which girl they want to help. There are cafe, garage and tattoo parlor. There will be 3 rounds and one girl will be eliminated at each other round. At the end, Sidharth will choose a winner between 3 girls. In the first round, Sidharth will make a tattoo on girls but the girls objective is to impress him. In the second round, Sidharth will use his ATV while girls will be cleaning the ATV to make a music video with him and in the last round, the remaining 3 girls will be a waitress with a tray and glasses. They will have to protect their glasses and drinks. They will keep holding the trays and they won't be able to sit down. At the end of 3rd round, whoever has more drinks and glasses will win the last round and will be safe from nominations.; Immunity Task: On Day 6, all other freshers have a chance to win this immunity except Rubina. The two inmates who win this task will get immunity. The task is about a landlord who has sent a bulldozer to destroy Bigg Boss. Freshers have to stop that bulldozer. Abhinav and Nikki will sit on the scooper after the first buzzer, then freshers will try to take their place by making them stand up from the scooper. If Abhinav and Nikki get up from the scooper, they can try again to sit on the scooper. At the end of the task, two inmates who are on the scooper will win. At a time, only two inmates can try to make the persons sitting on the scooper to leave. Nobody can throw water at any costs.
Week 1	Results	Winner (Entry Pass) – Nishant, Sara & Jaan
Week 1	Results	Failed (Entry Pass) – Rubina
Week 1	Results	Winner (Jewel Thief) – Abhinav
Week 1	Results	Failed (Jewel Thief) – Rest of male contestant
Week 1	Results	Winner (Sid's Island) – Nikki
Week 1	Results	Failed (Sid's Island) – Sara, Rubina, Pavitra & Jasmin
Week 1	Results	Winner (Immunity Task) – Nikki & Pavitra
Week 1	Results	Failed (Immunity Task) – Abhinav, Eijaz, Jaan, Jasmin, Nishant, Rahul, Sara & Shehzad
Week 2	Twist	On Day 15, freshers had to mutually decide whether Nikki should remain confirmed or not. They failed to come to any conclusion and Nikki remained confirmed.; On Day 16, since Jaan, Abhinav and Shehzad were in Bottom 3 all the housemates including senior had to vote out the housemates whom they want to evict. Shehzad received the most votes and he was given invisible title.; On Day 16, each freshers had to decide their team for future journey. Eijaz, Pavitra and Nikki choose Sidharth team. Nishant, Rubina, Abhinav and Jasmin choose Hina team and Jaan and Rahul choose Gauahar team.
Week 2	Nominations	On Day 10, each housemates had to take a pot paste the photo of two housemates one by one whom they want to nominate and give reason then broke the pot. Nikki is safe from this nomination and no one can nominate her. As a result, Abhinav, Eijaz, Jaan, Nishant, Rahul, Sara and Shehzad nominated for the eviction.; On Day 12, on the basis of task Abhinav, Jaan, Jasmin, Rubina and Shehzad were nominated.
Week 2	Tasks	Nomination Task (Mere Agne mein tera kya kaam): On Day 11, there were two teams Team A consist of Abhinav, Jaan, Jasmin, Rubina and Shehzad whereas Eijaz, Nishant, Pavitra and Rahul were in Team B. There was a farmland both the teams had to make their farm more pretty and bigger than the other team. The winning team will be saved from the nominations and the losing team will be nominated. Both the teams had to impress the senior in order to get soil from Gauahar, Grass from Sidharth and flower from Hina. Team A will get white flowers and Team B will get pink flowers. The shops will open on Bigg Boss orders. Only 2 inmates at a time can protect their farm and other members can go to destroy others farms. Nikki will be the referee of the task. Nikki's decision will be final. She can intervene at any point and time. At the end of the task, Nikki will decide which farm is pretty and big. Other Task: On Day 13, at a time Bigg Boss will announce two names, they had to fight off each other and win their stuff. There are pipes in the garden from which balls will be thrown they had to collect it. Once the buzzer blares, the one with more balls in the basket will win and get their stuff from BB mall and the loser's stuff will go away forever. Sponsor Task (BB Hairstyle Icon): On Day 14, all 4 freshers will try to style their hair to win the icon. They will become a character. The fresher boys will choose the titles which include Miss Drama queen, perfect khiladi, Nautanki and Miss. Confused. Each boy will give their title to a girl and then help them to get ready. The seniors will ask them questions and will choose a winner. Nishant and Abhinav will help the girls in getting ready. Luxury Budget Task: On Day 15, the two singers Rahul and Jaan will try to entertain the housemates by singing and playing. They will do a live performance to get support from freshers and seniors. The one who has more supporters will get a hamper. The winner can share the hamper with 4 other housemates. Rahul will perform in the bedroom. Jaan will perform near the SPA area. They will try to keep their supporters in their areas. If a housemate is changing their support, they will tell the reason for the singer and then change their support. All housemates will choose their support on their own.
Week 2	Exits	On Day 10, Sara was evicted after the mutual decision by the seniors.
Week 2	Result	Winner (Mere Agne Mein Tera Kya Kaam) – Eijaz, Nishant, Pavitra & Rahul
Week 2	Result	Failed (Mere Agne Mein Tera Kya Kaam ) – Abhinav, Jaan, Jasmin, Rubina & Shehzad
Week 2	Result	Winner (Other Task) – Pavitra, Eijaz, Nishant, Abhinav & Jasmin
Week 2	Result	Failed (Other Task) – Rest of contestant
Week 2	Result	Winner (BB Hairstyle Icon) – Pavitra
Week 2	Result	Failed (BB Hairstyle Icon) – Jasmin, Nikki & Rubina
Week 2	Result	Winner (Luxury Budget Task) – Jaan
Week 2	Result	Failed ( Luxury Budget Task) – Rahul
Week 3	Entrances	Pavitra and Eijaz entered a new part of the house named Red Zone
Week 3	Twist	A new section of the house named Red Zone was revealed in which The nominated inmates will stay until the eviction process was completed.
Week 3	Nominations	No Nominations
Week 3	Task	Game Over:The freshers and seniors have a relationship now. The three teams will fight. Sid team’s will have Eijaz, Pavitra and Nikki. Hina has Abhi, Rubina, Jasmin and Nishant. Gauhar has Rahul and Jaan. The losing team will leave the house today only along with their senior. There are three buzzers for each team in the garden. Each team has to try to protect their buzzers. They will try that other team doesn’t press their buzzer and they press on other’s buzzer. They will try to press the buzzer of the team which they want to take out. At a time, only 2 freshers can come forward to protect or attack the buzzer. The seniors can’t press the buzzer. They will just freshers. The team whose buzzer is pressed more will leave the house along with Shahzad. Their game will be over. The buzzer needs to press on for 5 seconds.; Jaan Bachi Toh Lakhon Paye:The task name is ‘Jaan bachi tou lakhon paye’. The winner will become the first captain of the house. In the garden area, there is a doll house and all inmates will be fire-fighters. They will rescue the doll of other inmate. When the buzzer plays, fire-fighter will go in the doll house and rescue one doll of the other inmate. The person who comes out of the doll house in the last will get the doll that he/she eliminated from the captaincy race. Before the buzzer plays, they can’t cross the red line which is made around the doll house. Pavitra and Eijaz will be the referee of the task.
Week 3	Results	Winner (Game Over) – Team Hina (Rubina, Abhinav, Jasmin, Nishant), Team Gauahar (Rahul, Jaan)
Week 3	Results	Failed (Game Over) – Team Siddharth (Pavitra, Eijaz, Nikki)
Week 3	Results	Winner (Immunity Task) – Nishant
Week 3	Results	Failed (Immunity Task) – Rest of the contestants
Week 3	Punishments	Nishant was removed from the Captain post due to violation of rules
Week 3	House Captain	Nishant Malkhani
Week 3	Notes	On Day 23, Salman asked all the housemates to choose 1 Name among Kavita, Naina and Shardul about who will go to the Red Zone. Since Kavita got 1 vote, Salman announced that she would be the captain.
Week 3	Exits	On Day 18, Shehzad was evicted by seniors. Seniors Hina, Gauahar and Sidharth left the House along with Pavitra Punia and Eijaz Khan as they lost the survival task.
Week 4	Entrances	On Day 23, Kavita Kaushik, Naina Singh and Shardul Pandit entered as wild card contestants
Week 4	Nominations	On Day 23, Pavitra, Jaan, Nikki and Rahul V were nominated; On Day 27, After the Tabadla, Rubina, Jasmin, Kavita and Nishant were nominated by Captain Eijaz
Week 4	Task	BB Monument Tour:The inmates have a chance to get the captaincy while Kavita has a chance to retain her captaincy. The inmates will not do the task but red-zone inmates will do the task on their behalf. The task is ‘BB monument’s tour’. All housemates will go on a world tour with their bags and try to get the captaincy. The red-zone inmates will try to grab the bags from the housemates, the housemates who is able to save their bag from the red-zone inmate will become the captain. The bags which are taken by the red-zone inmates will be eliminated from the task. The housemates should try to talk to red-zone inmates to support them. The captaincy is important so all have a chance to use their mind and make a captain which they want to. The first inmate to lose will become the referee of the task.
Week 4	Results	Winner (BB Monument Tour) – Eijaz
Week 4	Results	Failed (BB Monument Tour) –Rest of the contestants
Week 4	House Captain	Kavita Kaushik
Week 4	Exits	No Eviction as The voting was still going on
Week 5	Entrances	On Day 34, Aly Goni entered as a Wild Card Contestant
Week 5	Nominations	Rahul V, Rubina, Naina, Shardul
Week 5	Task	Solar System:the garden has been changed to a Solar System. All inmates will become a planet and run around the orbits. The inmate who stays on the Solar System till the end will become a captain. But there are some asteroids which can be used by red-zone inmates. All green-zone inmates will run in a circle and will try to throw one inmate out of the Solar System before meteor noise plays. Once the meteor buzzer plays then red-zone inmates will become eligible to take out inmate out of the task. The red-zone inmates will use asteroid to throw at one inmate that they want to take out. Jasmin will take all the decision after discussing it with Aly. Eijaz will not play as his shoulder is not fine so someone from the red-zone will represent him except Rahul. Eijaz chose Shardul; Immunity Task: Jasmin chose Rahul to be out of the task. Rubina, Naina and Shardul will choose a representative. Rubina chose Abhinav, Naina chose Nikki, Shardul chose Pavitra. The task was Abhinav, Nikki and Pavitra have to hold a triangle frame. Whoever keeps holding it till the end will win and the person they were representing will get out of red zone. Jasmin will be the referee.; Luxury Budget Task:There will be two teams and have to follow some rules. There will be angels who always have to do good. Other inmates will be devils and will try to get reactions from angels. Team devil Aly, Nikki, Eijaz. Team Angels will have Abhi, Pavitra, Jaan, Rubina. Team devils will have rules like destroying patience, talk in loud language. Team angels will have rules like not cursing, not getting angry, always keeping patience, eating simple meals. Jasmin reads that both teams will follow the rules and try to make the other teams break their rules. Jasmin will be the referee of the task. She will keep a track of rules breaking. When you are trying to make the other team break the rule, Jasmin has to be there. At the end of the task, Jasmin will decide who broke more rules and who won the task. Aly will be part of the devil team and talk to his team on call. Red-zone inmates will not be part of this task.
Week 5	Results	Winner (Solar System) – Jasmin
Week 5	Results	Failed (Solar System) – Rest of contestants
Week 5	Results	Winner (Immunity Task) – Rubina
Week 5	Results	Failed (Immunity Task) – Naina, Shardul
Week 5	Results	Winner (Luxury Budget Task) – Aly, Nikki, Eijaz
Week 5	Results	Failed (Luxury Budget Task) – Abhinav, Pavitra, Jaan, Rubina
Week 5	House Captain	Eijaz Khan
Week 5	Exits	On Day 31, Nishant Malkhani was evicted by Green Zone Inmates.; On Day 31, Kavita Kaushik was evicted by Public Vote.; On Day 36, Naina Singh was evicted by Public Vote.
Week 6	Entrances	On Day 36, Kavita Kaushik re-entered the Show
Week 6	Nominations	Rubina (by Captain); Shardul (By BB Aadalat)
Week 6	Task	Disco Night:This party will go on till morning but some big singers are coming that people don’t get concert tickets for. No inmate can sit or rest. They will all be in the garden, they can’t go in the house. You can use garden washroom. If you get out of the task and want to stay in the garden then sit on the bench. The person standing in the party till the end will become the captain of the house. During the party, inmates will keep getting out of the party.
Week 6	Results	Winner (Disco Night) – Aly
Week 6	Results	Failed (Disco Night) –Rest of the contestants
Week 6	House Captain	Jasmin Bhasin
Week 6	Notes	Immunity Stone: Ekta Kapoor entered the house and brought a stone with her named Immunity Stone in which A inmate can immune himself/herself anytime during nomination process. There were many tasks in order to get the immunity stone. At the end Ekta gave the immunity stone to Rubina
Week 6	Exits	On Day 43, Shardul Pandit was evicted by Public Vote
Week 6	Jail	Aly Goni chose Rubina and Abhinav to be in Jail
Week 7	Nominations	Eijaz, Jaan, Jasmin, Kavita, Nikki, Rubina
Week 7	Task	Castle:The house has been changed to a castle. The queen of red hearts will be Rubina and the king of black hearts will be Rahul. The king wants to see black hearts but the queen wants to be surrounded by red hearts. Rahul and Rubina will be against each other. All others will be workers, these workers will work for the reign which gives them more money. There are white hearts present in the garden. Rahul and Rubina will convince them to turn them into black or red hearts. They will give salaries to workers. Rahul and Rubina will get 1 lac BB currency each to give it to the workers. On the buzzer, they will get the ink and pens to make hearts. After all the rounds, whoever has more hearts will win the task between Rahul and Rubina and become a contender. The worker who has most of the BB currency will become the contender for the captaincy.; Captaincy Task:Eijaz, Aly, Jasmin and Kavita have a chance to win the captaincy. Jasmin reads that the four will remain inside a box. This task will be for the next captain. The 4 inmates in the box will try to spend time there and be the last person inside the box while the inmates outside should try to bring them out. Eijaz can’t sit in the box as he is not well, he chose Pavitra as his representative.
Week 7	Results	The Task was rejected by Bigg Boss
Week 7	Results	Winner (Captaincy Task) – Kavita
Week 7	Results	Failed (Captaincy Task) – Aly, Jasmin, Eijaz
Week 7	House Captain	Aly Goni
Week 7	Exits	On Day 50, Jaan Kumar Sanu was evicted by Public Vote
Week 8	Twist	On Day 56, Salman Khan announced that out of the 9 contestants, only 4 will go in the next level
Week 8	Nominations	Abhinav, Aly, Jasmin, Rubina, Pavitra, Rahul V
Week 8	Captaincy Task	BB Panchayat:Some inmates will move towards to become the captain, Kavita can take part in the task but she can’t become the captain. There is a family who is fighting over a property. There are two sisters which include Jasmin, Aly, and Nikki. Rubina will have Abhi, Eijaz and Pavitra. Rubina’s family has a kitchen. Jasmin’s family has a bathroom. If they want to use those parts of the house, they will have to ask the family. They will get a chance to win the other parts of the house. Kavita will be the judge of that. There will be a court hearing/village-conference where the families will give their points and blame the other family about why they shouldn’t get that part of the house. Jasmin and Rubina will be the lawyers of the family. The family who has more of the house at the end of the task will win the task and become contenders for the captaincy.
Week 8	Punishments	Aly Goni was ordered to keep his shoes in the storeroom due to the misbehaviour with Captain and was nominated for one week; Abhinav Shukla was ordered to keep all his luggage in the storeroom due to being a hindrance to the Task
Week 8	House Captain	Kavita Kaushik
Week 8	Notes	Since the Winning team couldn't decide about who will be the captain, Bigg Boss announced that there will be no captain
Week 8	Results	Winner (BB Panchayat) – Rahul V, Jasmin, Aly, Nikki
Week 8	Results	Failed (BB Panchayat) –Rubina, Abhinav, Pavitra, Eijaz
Week 8	Exits	On Day 57, Pavitra Punia was evicted by Public Vote
Week 9 (Finale Week)	Nominations	Nikki, Rahul V, Rubina, Jasmin
Week 9 (Finale Week)	Eviction Task	There is a speaker in the garden, this speaker can answer the questions related to your life but the speaker’s battery life is 27 minutes. You people will be the soul of this speaker, you have to answer the questions of the inmates. The speaker will be turned on for 37 minutes, after that you will stop answering the questions and leave the speaker side. The pair who is not able to count closest to 37 minutes will lose the task. All other inmates will distract the couple who is trying to count to 37 minutes, you can ask them questions to distract them from counting. You will press the buzzer when you think 37 minutes are over. The pairs were Jasmin-Aly, Rahul-Eijaz, Nikki-Kavita, Abhinav-Rubina: Nikki-Kavita: 31:21 Mins; Jasmin-Aly: 57:25 Mins; Rubina-Abhinav: 41:41 Mins; Eijaz-Rahul: 35:57 Mins; Since Aly and Jasmin Lost the task, They had to decide which among them would leave the house.
Week 9 (Finale Week)	Shark Attack Task	All have a chance today to become a finalist. The task name is ‘shark attack’. You people will try to get a chair in the boat ride but the shark will attack the boat, the person who loses their chair will be out of the task. The person who stays in the boat on a chair till the end will become a finalist. When the buzzer plays, the new round will start and the inmates will have to run to get a chair on the boat. Then till the screaming sound, they have to sit on the chair. The person who didn’t get the chair, he or she can try to get the chair from others till the screaming sound plays. Once you are on the boat, you can’t get down during the task. You can’t force someone out of the chair. You have to convince them to lose. Eijaz is the referee.
Week 9 (Finale Week)	Immunity Stone Task	Bigg Boss gives a chance to steal Rubina’s immunity stone and announces a task wherein each housemate will get a chance to win the immunity stone. The housemates have to go into the theatre and reveal the deepest darkest secret about themselves
Week 9 (Finale Week)	Exits	On Day 60, Aly Goni was evicted after losing the Task.; On Day 61, Kavita Kaushik quit the show after a heated and ugly argument with Rubina Dilaik. Kavita also fell ill.; On Day 64, Nikki Tamboli was evicted by Public Vote.; On Day 65, Rahul Vaidya quit the show.
Week 9 (Finale Week)	Results	Winner (Immunity Stone Task) – Eijaz
Week 9 (Finale Week)	Results	Failed (Immunity Stone Task) – Rest of contestants
Week 9 (Finale Week)	Results	Winner (Shark Attack Task) –Abhinav
Week 9 (Finale Week)	Results	Failed (Shark Attack Task) – Rest of contestants
Week 9 (Finale Week)	Results	Winner (37 Min Task) – Rest of contestants
Week 9 (Finale Week)	Results	Failed (37 Min Task) – Aly & Jasmin
Week 10	Entrances	On Day 66, Vikas Gupta, Arshi Khan, Kashmera Shah, Manu Punjabi and Rahul Mahajan entered the house as Challengers; On Day 70, Rakhi Sawant entered the show as Challengers; On Day 70, Aly Goni and Nikki Tamboli re-entered the house
Week 10	Nominations	Bigg Boss announces a nomination task where the contestants are divided into two groups. The task is about a display window of the shop where two contestants are standing as mannequins. The teams have to spoil the glass display window of the other team and each team has to protect their display while destroying that of others. Manu is the Sanchalak in this game as he is also the captain: At the end of the task, Rubina, Jasmin, Vikas and Kashmera were Safe and Abhinav, Arshi, Rahul Mahajan and Eijaz were nominated; The winning team had to decide which member of the winning team performed badly, Vikas took Kashmera's name and Kashmera was also Nominated
Week 10	Captaincy Task	The task will last till 6 rounds. Contenders are asked to fetch captaincy medal from the other contender by using their mind.
Week 10	Results	Winner (Nomination Task) – Rubina, Jasmin, Vikas and Kashmera
Week 10	Results	Failed (Nomination Task) – Abhinav, Arshi, Eijaz and Rahul M
Week 10	Results	Winner (Captaincy Medallion) –Manu
Week 10	Results	Failed (Captaincy Medallion) – Rest of contestants
Week 10	House Captain	Manu Punjabi
Week 10	Notes	Vikas had received a joker card in which he could be safe from eviction and can be used anytime in the season
Week 10	Exits	No Eviction
Week 11	Entrances	On Day 74, Rahul Vaidya re-entered the house
Week 11	Nominations	Abhinav, Arshi, Eijaz, Kashmera, Manu
Week 11	Tasks	Duck Park:three winning inmates will become contenders for the captaincy. There will be 4 ducks in the park and the visitors will give them food. The inmates will become ducks from time to time and everyone will play against each other. The inmates who become ducks will get time to eat. The other inmates will decide who will become a feeder for the ducks, they have to decide on a feeder before the buzzer. The duck who has more food at the end of one batch will become a winner for that batch. Each batch will have 4 different ducks. The referee will decide the winner of the batch. The batch has to be smart to get food, feeders can be repeated in the task.; Captaincy Medallion:Rakhi, Aly and Jasmin will be locked in jail separately. They have to get the captaincy medal but they have to open 4 gates to get it. The other inmates will try to get the key of the locks. When the gong plays, the inmate that goes in the red box first will get the key and choose which contender should move closer to the medal. Abhi will be the referee of the game. The person who gets 4 keys from the inmates will become the winner and the captain.
Week 11	Results	Winner (Duck Park) – Rakhi, Aly, Jasmin
Week 11	Results	Failed (Duck Park) – Rest of contestants
Week 11	Results	Winner (Captaincy Medallion) –Aly
Week 11	Results	Failed (Captaincy Medallion) – Rakhi, Jasmin
Week 11	House Captain	Aly Goni(later changed to Rubina Dilaik)
Week 11	Notes	On Day 77, Salman Khan announced that The captain will be changed from Aly to Rubina but Rubina will be non immune and Aly will be immuned
Week 11	Exits	On Day 72, Vikas Gupta was ejected from the house after throwing Arshi Khan into the pool; On Day 77, Kashmera Shah was evicted by Public Vote
Week 12	Entrances	On Day 80, Vikas Gupta re-entered the house; On Day 80, Sonali Phogat entered the house as a wild card
Week 12	Nominations	Abhinav, Eijaz, Rahul Mahajan, Manu
Week 12	Task	Hot Air Balloon: You will get a chance to become captain. There is a big hot air balloon in the garden. Some of you will get to ride it, Bigg Boss will take the names. After that rest of the people will have to put personal stuff of one member in the sack and try to put it on the balloon. This will be of the person you don’t want to become the captain. After that, hot air balloon will start and the time will be up to hand the sack. The person on the balloon will throw the sack in the balloon and that person will be out of the captain race. The last sack will become the captain.
Week 12	Results	Winner (Hot Air Balloon) – Vikas
Week 12	Results	Failed (Hot Air Balloon) – Rest of the contestants
Week 12	House Captain	Rubina Dilaik
Week 12	Exits	On Day 80, Manu Punjabi quit the show due to health issues
Week 12	Jail	Rahul Vaidya, Aly Goni and Nikki Tamboli were put in jail
Week 13	Nominations	Rubina, Rahul V, Rahul M, Abhinav, Nikki, Aly, Arshi, Eijaz, Rakhi, Sonali, Jasmin were nominated by Bigg Boss
Week 13	Captaincy Task	Julie Ka Badla:The story is about a ghost who wants to take revenge for years in the house, the ghost is of Julie, she was a nice and rich girl and was owner of the big house. She was in love with a greedy landlord. After their marriage, Julie got to know the reality of her husband. He just wanted her money, she tried to fight him but he killed her and dug her in a shallow grave and made a fountain over it. Julie’s ghost came back to take the revenge on him. The landlord married again, his second wife is an irritating woman and she is greedy. She brings people in the haveli to get gold from them. Rakhi will play Julie, Rahul M will play the rich landlord, Jasmin will be Rahul’s second wife. They have to play against Rakhi and get gold coins from the guests. The other inmates will be the guests. The inmate who has most gold left will become the contender also. Rahul M-Jasmin will sacrifice guests to Rakhi to take them out of the task but the guest can give some gold to Rakhi and enter the task again. All guests will get 50 coins each. At night time, the guests will keep the fire alive. Rakhi can enter the haveli to attack the guests.; BB New Year Party:There will be a new year party in the house and the host will be Arshi, Rakhi and Rahul M. There are three parts in the garden and they will host their own party. They have to make their party happening and enjoyable. The guests will be the inmates. When the doorbell rings, the inmates can leave one party and join another party. The contender who has the most guests by the end will be the winner and become the captain.
Week 13	Punishments	The entire house except Captain Vikas were nominated as Aly and Nikki were discussing about the nominations
Week 13	House Captain	Vikas Gupta
Week 13	Results	The Task was rejected by Bigg Boss
Week 13	Results	Winner (BB New Year Party) – Rahul M
Week 13	Results	Failed (BB New Year Party) – Arshi, Rakhi
Week 13	Exits	On Day 93, Rahul Mahajan was evicted by public vote
Week 14	Nominations	Rubina, Abhinav, Aly and Jasmin
Week 14	Captaincy Task	There will be two scientists who will test pills on the inmates who will be rats. The inmates will try to become a scientist. The task starts with two scientists and they will get a rat, the rat has to guess what color of the pill scientist chose for him’/her and eat it. There will be a scientists’ lab, they will mutually decide between red and green color. Then in the garden area, the rats have to choose between red and green. The scientists will choose the rat to find the pill and avoid the poisonous color. If the trumpet plays then the rat will win the round and replace a scientist, the replaced scientist will be out of the task. If the rat eats the poisonous pill then it will be out of the task. The scientists have to fool the rats about what colors to choose. There will be few rounds so all rats might not get a chance. At the end of the task, people who are scientists will become the contender for the captaincy. Aly and Sonali will be the scientists first.
Week 14	Luxury Budget Task(Talktime)	Today there will be a task where the inmates will get a chance to meet or talk to their family members. They will get total of 100 minutes of talk time so they have to meet their families within that time. The buzzer will play and Bigg Boss will tell him whose family is coming next, then the inmates will decide what talk time should that inmate get to meet his family. The inmates can’t choose equal talk time for each inmate. There will be freeze and release instructions given also. You have to convince others to give you more time. Later Bigg Boss asked all family members of Housemates about who she will choose between Rakhi and Sonali as a captain . Majority chose Rakhi and she became the captain
Week 14	Results	Winner (Captaincy Task) –Sonali, Rakhi
Week 14	Results	Failed (Captaincy Task) – Rest of contestants
Week 14	Punishments	Rubina, Abhinav, Aly and Jasmin was nominated as they were plotting for Nominations
Week 14	Exits	On Day 99, Jasmin Bhasin was evicted by public vote
Week 15	Nominations	Rubina, Rahul V, Nikki, Sonali
Week 15	Task	Mere Saame Wale Chaje Pe: Abhi and Rakhi live in a street and are neighbors. Abhi lives with his wife Rubina and siblings Vikas, Nikki and Arshi. Rakhi lives near his house and she is a naughty girl, her brothers are Aly and Rahul, her parents are Sonali and Eijaz. Abhi laughs hearing that. Rubina reads that Abhi’s family includes Rubina, Arshi, Vikas and Nikki. Rakhi’s family includes Aly, Rahul, Sonali and Eijaz. She reads that there are a water tank and a roof in the garden. Rakhi has fallen in love with Abhi so she is running behind Abhi all the time, she tries to flirt with him all the time. Rubina is fed-up with Rakhi so she will try to keep her husband away from Rakhi. When Rakhi doesn’t see Abhi, she can stand on the water tank and look for Abhi through her binoculars. Abhi’s family is making a wall in front of the water tank so Rakhi can stop looking at Abhi’s roof. But Rakhi’s family will try to stop Abhi’s family from making the wall so that Rakhi can keep taking Abhi’s photos. They will get materials for the wall from time to time in the godown. When the whistle blows, Abhi has to go to his roof to do his workout, spend time with Rubina, eat apples on the bench. When the whistle plays, a new round will start or end. When the whistle blows, they will stop making the wall. Abhi will go on the roof, Rakhi will go on her roof and will try to take Abhi’s pictures with her camera. She will submit the pictures she clicked of Abhi to Bigg Boss. If Rakhi is able to take his pictures then she will win the task with her team and her team will become contenders for the captaincy. But if Abhi’s team stops her from taking his pictures then they will win the task. After every round, Rakhi has to show the polaroid picture to Bigg Boss and put it in the storeroom. She will submit one photo after each round. After the task ends, the team who has won the most rounds will become the contenders for the captaincy.; Kai Po Che: Eijaz, Rahul, Nikki and Abhi are the captaincy contenders. The task name is ‘Kai Po Chi’. All the inmates have their kites in the sky, the captaincy contenders have to hold their kite’s threads and protect them but you have to attack other inmates’ threads too which means you will have to leave your thread. The person whose thread is safe till the end of the task will win and become a captain. The contender whose thread has been broken can re-enter the task if some other inmate is ready to give their kite to that contender. Only 2 inmates can try to break a thread at a time.
Week 15	Punishments	As a result of Back to Back cancellation of Tasks, Bigg Boss announced that There would be neither a captain nor any Immunity Task in the house and House Ration will be take away in the next week
Week 15	House Captain	Rakhi Sawant
Week 15	Results	Both The Tasks was rejected by Bigg Boss
Week 15	Exits	On Day 102, Vikas Gupta exited the house due to medical issues; On Day 105, There was no eviction so the nominations were carry forwarded to next week
Week 16	Entrances	On Day 106, Devoleena Bhattacharjee entered the house as Eijaz's proxy; Vikas Gupta re-entered the house
Week 16	Twist	Bigg Boss took all the ration items
Week 16	Nominations	Rubina, Rahul V, Nikki, Sonali
Week 16	Lockdown Task	The housemates will be judged on three parameters which are how well they follow the rules, their effort in the show and how involved they are in the house. Today in this task, they will not enter the house at any cost. The task name is ‘lockout’. There will be two teams and the winning team will enter the BB Mall to get ration while the defeated team will just get basics in the ration. Bigg Boss has confiscated the whole house and the inmates will stay in the garden. There will be two teams. Team red will have Rubina, Abhi, Vikas, Rakhi and Devo. Team yellow will have Aly, Rahul, Sonali, Nikki and Arshi. Team red’s leader is Rubina, team yellow’s leader is Rahul. They all have to wear the costumes of their team. When they have to use something in the house but it will be counted as a unit, everything will be counted in units. When the person enters the house, the other team’s leader will go with them and count the units. Only one person can enter the house at a time. The leaders will write the units of the other team on the board. The team that has the fewest of units at the end of the task will win
Week 16	Entertainment Task	The task is ‘press for entertainment’. You will be able to win the audience’s heart. Bigg Boss will call 2 inmates from time to time, the person who presses the buzzer first will be live on Voot for an hour. The audience will watch him and decide if that person was entertaining or not. They are not allowed to sing, they will entertain in a way they have been doing so in the house. They can converse with the inmates. There will be the referee of the task. The inmates can’t use cursing. The winner will be the most entertaining inmate in front of the audience. That person will get 5 items from the BB Mall.
Week 16	Punishments	Bigg Boss took all the rations and gave them basic ration and have to earn food items
Week 16	Results	Lockdown Task was rejected by Bigg Boss
Week 16	Results	Winner (Press For Entertainment) –Rubina, Rakhi
Week 16	Results	Failed (Press For Entertainment) – Rest of contestants
Week 16	Notes	Seeing the performance of housemates in the last 3 days, Bigg Boss gave 5 food items to the other inmates
Week 16	Exits	On Day 106, Eijaz Khan had left the house due to prior commitments; On Day 113, Sonali Phogat was evicted by public vote
Week 17	Nominations	Devoleena, Nikki, Rahul and Vikas: As a result of these nominations, Bedroom, Gym, Spa and 1 part of the Bathroom was closed
Week 17	Task	College Rivalry: They will be college students. Rubina says the red college will Rubina, Abhi, Nikki and Arshi. The yellow colleague will have Aly, Rahul, Rakhi and Devo. Rubina says Vikas will be the referee of the task. All laugh. Rubina says there will be two colleges and they have a rivalry. They try to put each other down. There is a common hangout zone. Each student will get their cycles which they will run around in the garden. You will try to burst the tires of the other team. There is a cycle shop for each team where there is an air pump that the inmates can use once they have a punctured tire. They can’t steal anything from the shop. There is a cafe in the house when the buzzer plays, which means one team has to sit in the cafe. They will have to leave their cycles and can’t protect them. The first team red will go in the cafe and then team yellow will sit in the cafe in the next round. The other team can’t steal their cycles. At the end of the task, if any team has one intact cycle will win the task. The winning team will be able to use the prohibited areas of the house and they can get the items from the BB Mall.; Time Loop:The morning slot written on the board will be first, then the afternoon slot will follow. Then they will follow the evening. They will be in the loop of one slot till the tape music plays and the lights flick. Then you will tell which inmate got out of the loop, that inmate will become the time-king/queen who will choose the next failing inmate. The king or queen will get the golden stick. The inmates have to complete their activities in the time-loop and stop the others from completing theirs. The inmates chosen by the time-king/queen will not win the task but they can stop others from winning the task. The people remaining in the task at the end will become winners and get 3 items from BB Mall and have access to the prohibited areas. The first time-loop will be about completing their activities and not stop others from doing their tasks so the audience understands their activities.; Morning slot: When the lights flicker, all inmates will go to their bed. Arshi, Nikki, Rakhi, Rubina, Rahul and Devo will dance when a song plays and they will keep dancing while all others remain in their beds.; Afternoon slot: Rahul will make tea for Aly, Vikas and Abhi. Nikki will say no Rahul and ask him to make cold coffee for her. Abhi will go for sunbathing, Rakhi will go and apply oil to his body. Arshi will comment on them. Rubina will be drying the clothes but will get distracted by Abhi and fall in the pool. All laugh. Aly will jump in the pool to save Rubina.; Evening slot: Rubina will take a bath, Vikas-Rakhi will do Rakhi’s makeup. Then Rakhi will go behind Abhi. Then Aly will go for a bath and go to his bed. Rahul will steal the coffee and make it for Nikki. Nikki will clean the living area, Arshi will clean the luggage area.; They have to keep repeating these activities. We can’t sit in the time-loop.
Week 17	Punishments	1 Part of the Bathroom was also closed as Arshi went inside the spa
Week 17	Results	College Rivalry Task was rejected by Bigg Boss
Week 17	Results	Winner (Time Loop) –Rubina, Aly, Nikki
Week 17	Results	Failed (Time Loop) – Rest of contestants
Week 17	Exits	On Day 120, Vikas Gupta was evicted by facing public vote
Week 18	Nominations	Abhinav, Arshi, Aly, Devoleena, Nikki, Rakhi, Rubina
Week 18	BB Share Market Task	The house is now the stock market. Abhi is the owner of a stock company and Aly is the owner of another stock company. Their stock companies have to buy a portion of the house. The other inmates will be share-holders of the house areas and will try to increase the share points of their stocks. The locations are given as: Rubina – kitchen; Arshi – living area; Rakhi – bathroom; Nikki – gym; Rahul – bedroom; Devo – garden; To increase their points, you should convince other inmates to spend more time in your areas. You have to bargain with Abhi and Aly to sell your areas in more points. One broker can buy one area only.When the gong plays, they can change the points of the areas. Both Aly and Abhi have 1 lac points right now. When they buy an area, they will minus the points from their balance. The person who has bought more properties in the house between Aly-Abhi will win the task, the share-holder of the area which has been sold with the highest point will win the task as well. The 2 winners will get exclusive meals, they will choose 2 inmates to get items from BB Mall.
Week 18	Exits	On Day 127, Arshi Khan was evicted by facing the public vote
Week 18	Results	BB Share Market Task was rejected by Bigg Boss
Week 18	Punishments	Rubina Dilaik was nominated for the rest of the season as a result of throwing water on Rakhi; Devoleena was nominated for the rest of the season as a result of breaking items in the house & trying to hit Rubina Dilaik.
Week 19	Nominations	Rubina, Devoleena, Aly, Rahul V
Week 19	Tasks	Ticket To Finale Task:The task has a wagon in the garden with sacks and stamps. In the task, all inmates will team with their supporters. Some inmates will stay in the wagon and make sure that you stamp the sacks with your names. The other inmates will store the sacks in their barrels. You will give your sacks to your supporter from the wagon’s three windows. When the horse sound plays, it means you can’t send the sacks from the wagon. Paras will then count the sacks from the barrels and see if their stamps are there. The inmate who has the fewest sacks in the barrels will be out of the race. There are two types of stamps in the wagon, one type has inmates’ names on it and there is an ‘X’ stamp which you can use to cross someone’s name from the sack and stamp your name on it. The inmates have to decide who will stay in the wagon to stamp the sacks and who will stay near the barrels. You will have to keep storing your sacks in the barrels. The person who has the most number of sacks in their barrel will win the task.; BB ATM Task:Rahul, Aly and Rakhi have a chance to become a finalist by using some of the money from the winning amount. There are an ATM and a shredding machine in the garden. There are three envelopes with their names written on them. When the buzzer plays, an amount will be shown on the board. The inmate can write that amount as a cheque and shred that cheque. If you shred the cheque then you will save yourself but that amount will be deducted from the winning amount. If you don’t want to use the cheque then you will put the cheque in the ATM. After every round, the amount will keep increasing. They will decide themselves who will go when in the task. At the end of the task, whoever has deposited the amount in the ATM will remain nominated and the person who shreds the cheque will use the amount and reach the finale.
Week 19	Notes	Rubina had won the Ticket to Finale Task, but since she was nominated for the rest of the season as a punishment; She has to give Ticket to Finale to anyone other than Devoleena. She gave it to Nikki and Nikki became the 1st finalist; In BB ATM Task, Rakhi shredded a cheque of 14 Lakh Rupees from the winner's prize money and became the 2nd finalist
Week 19	Results	Winner (Ticket to Finale Task) – Rubina
Week 19	Results	Failed (Ticket to Finale Task) – Rest of contestants
Week 19	Results	Winner (BB ATM Task) –Rakhi
Week 19	Results	Failed (BB ATM Task) – Aly, Rahul
Week 19	Exits	On Day 131, Abhinav Shukla was evicted by supporters; On Day 134, Devoleena Bhattacharjee (Eijaz Khan) was evicted by facing the public Vote
Week 20 Finale Week	Nominations	All the finalists were nominated
Week 20 Finale Week	Task	Wishes Den:There is a den and 3 chairs, At the end of the task, the three inmates sitting on the chair in the cave will be winners. There will be orders sent for the inmates in the cave, if they complete the order then they can take the chair from another inmate. You have to think if your wish is more important or that sacrifice. The three winners will earn wishes.; Cupid's Revenge:In this task, The inmates will get waist-belts which have balloons and cupid arrow will be sent. When the buzzer plays, a person will hold the arrow as a cupid and can burst as many balloons of other inmates as they can. One inmate can be a cupid once only in the task. You will burst balloons of inmates who you think don’t deserve to be a finalist. You have to protect your balloons from the cupid, they can’t burst balloons of the cupid. When your balloon is burst, you can take another balloon and attach it to your belt. The person with the most balloons will win the task and get free access of BB Mall for the rest of the days.
Week 20 Finale Week	Results	Winner (Cupid's Revenge) – Aly
Week 20 Finale Week	Results	Failed (Cupid's Revenge) – Rest of contestants
Week 20 Finale Week	Results	Winner (Wishes Den) –Rubina, Aly, Rakhi
Week 20 Finale Week	Results	Failed (Wishes Den) – Nikki, Rahul V
Week 20 Finale Week	Happenings	On Day 135, RJs had come to interview the finalists and play games; On Day 136, Abhinav Shukla visited the house for a date with Rubina Dilaik; On Day 138, All the wishes of the contestants were fulfilled; On Day 139, Rajkummar Rao, Bharti Singh and Haarsh Limbachiyaa interacted with the housemates; On Day 140, Journey of the Finalists were shown
Finalists
4th Runner Up		Rakhi Sawant
3rd Runner Up		Aly Goni
2nd Runner Up		Nikki Tamboli
1st Runner Up		Rahul Vaidya
Winner		Rubina Dilaik

== Nominations table ==
#BB14 First Level	Week 1	Week 2			Week 3	Second Level	Week 4			Week 5			Week 6	Week 7	Week 8	Week 9				Third Level	Week 10	Week 11	Week 12	Week 13	Week 14	Week 15	Week 16		Week 17	Week 18	Week 19		Week 20	
#BB14 First Level	Week 1	Day 10	Day 12	Day 16	Week 3	Second Level	Day 22	Day 24	Day 27	Day 31	Day 32	Day 34	Week 6	Week 7	Week 8	Day 59	Day 60	Day 62	Finale Day 64	Third Level	Week 10	Week 11	Week 12	Week 13	Week 14	Week 15	Week 16		Week 17	Week 18	Day 130	Day 133	Grand Finale Day 142	
Nominees for Captaincy	No; Captain					Nominees for Captaincy	Abhinav; Jaan; Jasmin; Nikki; Nishant; Rahul V Rubina	Kavita; Naina; Shardul	Abhinav; Eijaz; Jasmin; Kavita; Naina; Nishant; Rubina; Shardul			Abhinav; Eijaz; Jaan; Jasmin; Nikki; Pavitra		Abhinav; Aly; Eijaz; Jaan; Jasmin; Kavita; Nikki; Pavitra; Rahul V Rubina; Shardul	Aly; Eijaz; Jasmin; Kavita	Jasmin; Nikki; Rahul V				Nominees for Captaincy	Abhinav; Arshi; Eijaz; Jasmin; Kashmera; Manu; Rahul M Rubina; Vikas	No; Captain	Aly; Jasmin; Rakhi	Abhinav; Aly; Arshi; Eijaz; Jasmin; Nikki; Rahul M Rahul V Rakhi; Rubina; Sonali; Vikas	Arshi; Rahul M Rakhi	Rakhi; Sonali	Abhinav; Eijaz; Nikki; Rahul V	Captaincy Cancelled						
House Captain	No; Captain					House Captain	~~Nishant~~	Kavita	Eijaz			Jasmin		Aly	Kavita	No; Captain				House Captain	Manu	No; Captain	~~Aly~~; Rubina	Vikas	~~Rahul M~~	Rakhi	No; Captain	Captaincy Cancelled						
Captain's Nominations	No; Captain					Captain's Nominations	Captain; Dismissed	Eijaz (to save)	Kavita; Nishant; Jasmin; Rubina (to evict)	Nishant (to evict)	Jasmin (to save)	Rahul V (to evict)	Rubina (to evict)	Kavita; Nikki; Jaan; Abhinav; Eijaz; Rubina (to evict)	Eijaz (to save); Aly (to evict)	No; Captain				Captain's Nominations	Not eligible	No; Captain	Eijaz (to evict)	Not eligible	Captain Evicted	Abhinav (to save)	No; Captain	Captaincy Cancelled						
Vote to:	Task	Evict	Task	Evict	Task	Vote to:	Red Zone	Evict				Task	Save/Evict			Task	37-Min	None	Finale	Vote to:	Task	Evict		Save	None	Evict	None		Evict	Save	Evict	None	WIN	
Rubina	Nominated	Nishant; Eijaz	Nominated	Jaan	Confirmed	Rubina	Kavita	Rahul V Nikki	Swapped	Nominated	Nominated against Abhinav	Safe	Aly (to save)	Not eligible	Pavitra (to evict)	Lost against Eijaz	41:41 Mins	Nominated	Moved to Third Level	Rubina	Safe	Arshi; Eijaz	House Captain	Abhinav; Nikki	Nominated	Rahul V	Nominated		Devoleena; Rahul V	Wrote; Abhinav's; Name	Devoleena	Nominated	No; Nominations	Winner (Day 142)
Rahul V	Nominated	Abhinav; Nishant	Safe	Abhinav	Confirmed	Rahul V	Naina	Rubina; Jaan	Jasmin	Nishant	Nominated against Nikki	Nominated	Nikki (to save)	Swapped Pavitra with Rubina	Eijaz (to evict)	Not eligible	35:57 Mins	Nominated	Walked (Day 64)	Rahul V	Walked (Day 64)		Abhinav; Rubina	Aly; Nikki	Safe	Nikki	Nominated		Nikki; Vikas	Scrapped; Abhinav's; Name	Nikki	Nominated	No; Nominations	1st runner-up (Day 142)
Nikki	Safe	Shehzad; Abhinav	Confirmed	Abhinav	Safe	Nikki	Naina	Nishant; Abhinav	Kavita	Nishant	Saved against Rahul V	Not eligible	Jaan (to save)	Not eligible	Aly (to save)	Lost against Eijaz	31:21 Mins	Nominated	Rejected	Nikki	Evicted (Day 64)	Kashmera; Arshi	Abhinav; Arshi	Rahul V Rubina	Safe	Sonali	Nominated		Devoleena; Rakhi	Kept; Rahul V's; Name	Abhinav	Saved by Rubina	No; Nominations	2nd runner-up (Day 142)
Aly	Entered in Second Level					Aly	Not in House					Quarantined	Abhinav (to save)	House; Captain	Rubina (to evict)	Not eligible	57:25 Mins	Evicted (Day 60)		Aly	Evicted (Day 60)	Arshi; Eijaz	~~House Captain~~	Jasmin; Rahul V	Nominated	Nikki	Safe		Vikas; Rakhi	Wrote; Rahul V's; Name	Abhinav	Nominated	No; Nominations	3rd runner-up (Day 142)
Rakhi	Entered in Third Level					Rakhi	Entered in Third Level													Rakhi	Not In House	Arshi; Manu	Manu; Rahul M	Rubina; Abhinav	Safe	House Captain	Safe		Arshi; Rahul V	Kept; Abhinav's; Name	Abhinav	Saved through BB ATM; Task	No; Nominations	Walked, 4th runner-up (Day 142)
Eijaz	Nominated	Rahul V Shehzad	Safe	Shehzad	Evicted (Day 18)	Eijaz	Shardul	Rahul V	House; Captain			Not eligible	Pavitra (to save)	Not eligible	Abhinav (to evict)	Won against Rubina	35:57 Mins	Finalist	Moved to Third Level	Eijaz	Nominated	Jasmin; Abhinav	Rahul V Rubina	Aly; Sonali	Safe	Rubina	Walked (Day 106)	Devoleena	Vikas; Nikki	Kept; Rahul V's; Name	Rahul V	Nominated	Evicted (Day 134)	
Abhinav	Nominated	Rahul V Shehzad	Nominated	Shehzad	Confirmed	Abhinav	Shardul	Nikki; Rahul V	Not eligible	Nishant	Saved against Rubina	Not eligible	Kavita (to save)	Swapped Rubina with Rahul V	Rahul V (to evict)	Lost against Eijaz	41:41 Mins	Finalist	Moved to Third Level	Abhinav	Nominated	Eijaz; Kashmera	Arshi; Rahul V	Rubina; Rahul M	Nominated	Saved by Captain	Safe		Rahul V Devoleena	Kept; Abhinav's; Name	Devoleena	Evicted by Supporters (Day 130)		
Arshi	Entered in Third Level					Arshi	Entered in Third Level													Arshi	Nominated	Rahul M Manu	Abhinav; Rahul M	Eijaz; Aly	Safe	Sonali	Safe		Vikas; Nikki	Kept; Abhinav's; Name	Evicted (Day 127)			
Vikas	Entered in Third Level					Vikas	Entered in Third Level													Vikas	Safe	Ejected (Day 72)		House; Captain	Safe	Rahul V	Walked (Day 102)		Arshi; Devoleena	Evicted (Day 120)				
Sonali	Entered in Third Level					Sonali	Entered in Third Level													Sonali	Not in House			Arshi; Rahul V	Safe	Rubina	Nominated	Evicted (Day 113)						
Jasmin	Nominated	Rahul V Abhinav	Nominated	Abhinav	Confirmed	Jasmin	Naina	Rahul V Jaan	Swapped	Nominated	Saved by Captain	House; Captain		Swapped Abhinav with Pavitra	Nikki (to save)	Lost against Eijaz	57:25 Mins	Nominated	Moved to Third Level	Jasmin	Safe	Arshi; Eijaz	Rahul M Manu	Aly; Abhinav	Nominated	Evicted (Day 99)								
Rahul M	Entered in Third Level					Rahul M	Entered in Third Level													Rahul M	Nominated	Arshi; Rubina	Jasmin; Manu	Eijaz; Abhinav	Evicted (Day 93)									
Manu	Entered in Third Level					Manu	Entered in Third Level													Manu	House; Captain	Aly; Arshi	Rakhi; Jasmin	Walked (Day 80)										
Kashmera	Entered in Third Level					Kashmera	Entered in Third Level													Kashmera	Nominated	Nikki; Abhinav	Evicted (Day 78)											
Kavita	Entered in Second Level					Kavita	Not in House	House Captain	Swapped	Nominated	Evicted (Day 31)		Not eligible	Not eligible	House Captain	Lost against Eijaz	31:21 Mins	Walked (Day 61)		Kavita	Walked in Second Level													
Pavitra	Safe	Rahul V Eijaz	Safe	Shehzad	Evicted (Day 18)	Pavitra	Naina	Rahul V	Rubina	Nishant	Safe	Not eligible	Rahul V (to save)	Swapped Rahul V with Jasmin	Jasmin (to evict)	Evicted (Day 57)				Pavitra	Evicted in Second Level													
Jaan	Nominated	Rahul V Sara	Nominated	Abhinav	Confirmed	Jaan	Shardul	Rahul V Nikki	Nishant	Nishant	Safe	Not eligible	Eijaz (to save)	Not eligible	Evicted (Day 50)					Jaan	Evicted in Second Level													
Shardul	Entered in Second Level					Shardul	Not in House	Nishant; Rubina	Not eligible	Nishant	Nominated against Naina	Nominated	Nominated by Adalat	Evicted (Day 43)						Shardul	Evicted in Second Level													
Naina	Entered in Second Level					Naina	Not in House	Nikki; Jaan	Not eligible	Kavita	Nominated against Shardul	Nominated	Evicted (Day 36)							Naina	Evicted in Second Level													
Nishant	Nominated	Shehzad; Rahul V	Safe	Abhinav	Confirmed	Nishant	Shardul	Rahul V Nikki	Swapped	Nominated	Evicted by Housemates (Day 31)									Nishant	Evicted by Housemates in the Second level													
Shehzaad	Nominated	Nishant; Abhinav	Nominated	Abhinav	Evicted by Housemates & Seniors (Day 18)	Shehzaad	Evicted by Housemates & Seniors in the First Level													Shehzaad	Evicted by Housemates & Seniors in the First Level													
Sara	Nominated	Jaan; Rahul V	Evicted by Seniors (Day 9)			Sara	Evicted by Seniors in the First Level													Sara	Evicted by Seniors in the First Level													
Seniors
Gauahar		Sara		Shehzad	Duration Complete (Day 18)																													
Hina		Sara		Shehzad	Duration Complete (Day 18)																													
Sidharth		Sara		Shehzad	Duration Complete (Day 18)																													
Notes						Notes														Notes														
Against Public Vote	Abhinav; Eijaz; Jaan; Jasmin; ~~Nikki~~; Nishant; ~~Pavitra~~; Rahul V Rubina; Sara; Shehzad	Abhinav; Eijaz; Jaan; Nishant; Rahul V Sara; Shehzad	Abhinav; Jaan; Jasmin; Rubina; Shehzad	Abhinav; Jaan; Shehzad	Team Gauahar; Team Hina; Team Sidharth	Against Public Vote	~~Jaan~~; ~~Nikki~~; ~~Pavitra~~; ~~Rahul V~~		Jasmin; Kavita; Nishant; Rubina		Naina; Rahul V ~~Rubina~~; Shardul		Rubina; Shardul	Eijaz; Jaan; Jasmin; Kavita; Nikki; Rubina	Abhinav; Aly; Jasmin; Pavitra; Rahul V Rubina	Abhinav; Aly; Jasmin; Kavita; Nikki; Rahul V Rubina	Aly; Jasmin	Jasmin; Nikki; Rahul V Rubina		Against Public Vote	Abhinav; Arshi; Eijaz; Kashmera; Rahul M	Abhinav; Arshi; Eijaz; Kashmera; Manu	Abhinav; Eijaz; ~~Manu~~; Rahul M	Abhinav; Aly; Arshi; Eijaz; Jasmin; Nikki; Rahul M Rahul V Rakhi; Rubina; Sonali	Abhinav; Aly; Jasmin; Rubina	Nikki; Rahul V Rubina; Sonali			Devoleena; Nikki; Rahul V Vikas	Abhinav; Aly; Arshi; Devoleena; Nikki; Rakhi; Rubina	Abhinav; Aly; Devoleena; Nikki; Rahul V Rakhi; Rubina	Aly; Devoleena; ~~Nikki~~; Rahul V ~~Rakhi~~; Rubina	Aly; Nikki; Rahul V Rakhi; Rubina	
Re-entered	None					Re-entered	Eijaz	None					Kavita	None						Re-entered	Nikki	Rahul V	Vikas	None			Vikas		None					
Re-entered	None					Re-entered	Pavitra	None					Kavita	None						Re-entered	Aly	Rahul V	Vikas	None			Vikas		None					
Walked	None					Walked	None										Kavita	Rahul V		Walked	None		Manu	None		Vikas	Eijaz		None					
Ejected	None					Ejected	None													Ejected	Vikas	None							None					
Evicted	No; Eviction	Sara	No; Eviction		Shehzad	Evicted	No; Eviction			Nishant	Naina		Shardul	Jaan	Pavitra	Aly		Nikki		Evicted	No; Eviction	Kashmera	No; Eviction	Rahul M	Jasmin	No; Eviction	Sonali		Vikas	Arshi	Abhinav	Devoleena	Rakhi	Aly
Evicted	No; Eviction	Sara	No; Eviction		Eijaz	Evicted	No; Eviction			Kavita	Naina		Shardul	Jaan	Pavitra	Aly		Nikki		Evicted	No; Eviction	Kashmera	No; Eviction	Rahul M	Jasmin	No; Eviction	Sonali		Vikas	Arshi	Abhinav	Devoleena	Nikki	
Evicted	No; Eviction	Sara	No; Eviction		Pavitra	Evicted	No; Eviction			Kavita	Naina		Shardul	Jaan	Pavitra	Aly		Nikki		Evicted	No; Eviction	Kashmera	No; Eviction	Rahul M	Jasmin	No; Eviction	Sonali		Vikas	Arshi	Abhinav	Devoleena	Rahul V	Rubina

Color Key

Selected Housemates by Seniors (Week 1-2)
Rejected Housemates by Seniors (Week 1-2)
Team Gauahar (Week 3)
Team Hina (Week 3)
Team Sidharth (Week 3)
Challengers
No Team (Week 3)
indicates that the Housemate was directly nominated for eviction.
indicates that the Housemate was immune prior to nominations.
indicates that the Housemate has been evicted.
indicates that the Housemate has been evicted by Seniors or Housemates.
indicates that the housemate has re entered.
indicates the contestant walked out due to emergency.
indicates the contestant has been ejected.
indicates the house captain.

=== Nomination notes ===
- Kavita Kaushik walked out of the house following an argument between her and Rubina Dilaik.
- Rahul Vaidya quit the show on Day 64 after feeling homesick.
- Vikas Gupta was ejected from the show after he had pushed co–housemate Arshi Khan into the swimming pool.
- Vikas Gupta walks out of the house due to health issues.
- Manu Punjabi walks out of the house due to health issues.
- Eijaz Khan walks out of the house due to his prior commitments.
- Devoleena Bhattacharjee entered as Eijaz's replacement. Her eviction is counted as Eijaz's eviction.
- Rakhi Sawant walks out of the house after taking 14 Lakh rupees home.
