= Palash Muchhal =

Indian composer (born 1995)

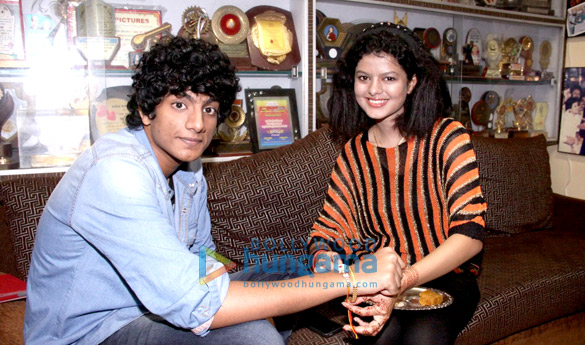
- Palash with sister Palak during Raksha Bandhan celebrations in 2013

Background information
- Born: May 22, 1995 (age 31); Indore, Madhya Pradesh, India
- Genres: Hindustani classical music, Filmi
- Occupation: Film score composer

Palash Muchhal (born 22 May 1995) is an Indian music composer. He is the brother of Indian singer Palak Muchhal and brother-in-law of Indian singer and composer Mithoon. He began composing music for Bollywood films as a teenager. He began dating the cricketer Smriti Mandhana in 2019, and they announced their engagement in November 2025, though the wedding was subsequently called off.

== Discography ==
Denotes films that have not yet been released

Year	Films/Albums	Songs	Singers	Lyrics	Notes
2014	Dishkiyaoon	Tu Hi Hai Aashiqui (Solo)	Arijit Singh	Sanamjit Singh Talwar	
2014	Dishkiyaoon	Nachle Tu	Mika Singh, Palak Muchhal	Sanamjit Singh Talwar	
2014	Dishkiyaoon	Tu Hi Hai Aashiqui (Duet)	Arijit Singh, Palak Muchhal	Sanamjit Singh Talwar	
2014	Dishkiyaoon	Tu Hi Hai Aashiqui (Remix)	Arijit Singh, Altamash Faridi	Sanamjit Singh Talwar	
2014	Bhoothnath Returns	Party To Banti Hai	Meet Bros Anjjan and Mika Singh	Kumaar	
2015	Miss Tanakpur Haazir Ho	Naach Basanti	Anmol Malik, Anjan Guha	Vinay Bihari, Shashi Joshi	
2015	Miss Tanakpur Haazir Ho	Sasure Ke Kaudy Lag Gaye	Sapna Awasthi, Shailesh Srivastav	Vinod Kapri	
2015	Teri Ek Hassi	Teri Ek Hassi	Jubin Nautiyal	Palak Muchhal	
2016	Tujhse	Tujhse	Mickey Singh	Palak Muchhal	
2016	Sajna Ve	Sajna Ve	Dilip Soni, Monali Thakur	Palak Muchhal	
2017	Tu Jo Kahe	Tu Jo Kahe	Yasser Desai	Palak Muchhal	
2017	Sweetiee Weds NRI	Musafir	Atif Aslam, Palak Muchhal	Palak Muchhal	
2017	Sweetiee Weds NRI	Wedding	Palak Muchhal, Shahid Mallya	Palak Muchhal	
2017	Sweetiee Weds NRI	Kinara	Palak Muchhal	Palak Muchhal	
2017	Sweetiee Weds NRI	Musafir (Reprise)	Arijit Singh	Palak Muchhal	
2017	Sweetiee Weds NRI	Musafir (Remix)	Atif Aslam, Arijit Singh	Palak Muchhal	
2017	T-Series Acoustic	Kinara	Palak Muchhal	Palak Muchhal	
2018	Nishaa	Nishaa	Yasser Desai	Palak Muchhal, Palash Muchhal	
2019	Puncch Beat	Ishqaan	Amit Mishra	Palak Muchhal	
2019	Jungle Cry	TBA	TBA		
	Tere Aane Sey	TBA	TBA		
	Dreams Hopes Sweetie Desai Weds Nri	TBA	TBA		
	Googly Ho Gayi	TBA	TBA		
2024	The Great Indian Leaked Video	Chitti Kheshi	Renuka Panwar		
2024	The Great Indian Leaked Video	Khuda Ke Banday	Anurag Halder, Palak Muchhal		
2024	The Great Indian Leaked Video	Sunakhi	Miss Pooja		
2024	The Great Indian Leaked Video	Anjaam Tumhara Hoga	Altamash Faridi		
2024	The Great Indian Leaked Video	No Fluke	Farmaan, SMG		
2024	The Great Indian Leaked Video	Jashn Banta hai	Palak Mucchhal		

=== As singer ===
Year	Films/Albums	Songs	Co-Singers	Lyrics	Notes
2017	Sweetiee Weds NRI	Zindagi Bana Loon	Solo	Banjara Rafi	

=== As director ===
Denotes films that have not yet been released

Year	Films/Albums	Actors	Producers	Story	Notes
2015	Teri Ek Hassi	Nandish Sandhu, Rashami Desai	Gurpreet Singh (One Digital Entertainment) & Palash Muchhal (Cut It Okay)	Palash Muchhal	
2016	Tujhse	Mickey Singh, Nataša Stanković	Gurpreet Singh	Palash Muchhal, Kartik Parande, Prince Shah	
2016	Sajna Ve	Salman Yusuff Khan, Rashami Desai	Gurpreet Singh	Palash Muchhal, Prince Shah	
2017	Khushi Waali Khushi	Palak Muchhal			Concept- Palak Muchhal
2022	Ardh	Rajpal Yadav, Rubina Dilaik	Himself		
2024	Kaam Chalu Hai	Rajpal Yadav, Gia Manek	Himself	Palash Muchhal	
