= Arshi Khan =

Indian model and actress

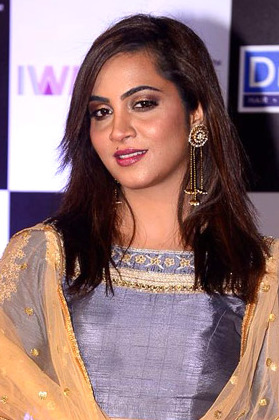
- Khan in 2018
- Born: Bhopal, Madhya Pradesh, India
- Occupations: Actress, model
- Years active: 2014–present
- Known for: Bigg Boss 11
- Political party: Indian National Congress (2019)

Arshi Khan, is an Indian model, actress, internet celebrity, reality television personality and former politician. She is known for participating in Bigg Boss 11. She joined the Indian National Congress party to contest the 2019 elections for Mumbai.

== Personal life ==
Khan was reportedly born in Afghanistan and belonged to a Pathan family of Bhopal although she has also clarified with another statement where it was her grandfather that was from Afghanistan and migrated to Bhopal. She and her family are possible said to have moved to India when Khan was four years old. Khan did her schooling and graduation at Bhopal. Later, Khan went to Mumbai to try her luck in acting and modelling. Khan was a qualified physiotherapist before she started pursuing a career in acting and modelling.

Recently, Khan opened up about her hardships moving to Mumbai after eviction from Bigg Boss 14.

== Career ==
She was chosen to portray a lead role in India's first mainline Bollywood 4D historical action film titled "The Last Emperor". She has also appeared in the Tamil film Malli Mishtu. In 2017, she was one of the participants in the reality television show Bigg Boss 11. She was earlier considered to participate in the last two seasons of the show. During her appearances on the show, she was Google India's second-most searched entertainer of 2017.

In 2018, Arshi featured in a Punjabi Music video- Nakhre. Khan has been featured in 5 music videos that include "Bandi", which has already gained 4.2 million on YouTube and Nain Nasheele which already has started to hit 2 million worldwide.

She was a participant in Bigg Boss 14, where she joined in as one of the four challenger participants.

Arshi joined The Great Khali's wrestling school CWE in 2021.

== Political career ==
In February 2019, Arshi joined Indian National Congress, but later resigned in August due to professional commitments.

== Controversies ==
In September 2015, Khan claimed to be in a relationship with Pakistani cricketer Shahid Afridi. In the same year she said that self-proclaimed spiritual leader Radhe Maa ran a prostitution ring, and that she had been approached to join it.

In 2016, the mufti of a madrassa in Pakistan issued a fatwa against Khan after she posted pictures of herself to Facebook wearing a bikini with a hijab, with another photo of herself in a burkha, after which her Facebook account was blocked.

During her stay in Bigg Boss house, an arrest warrant was issued against her by a court in Jalandhar, which according to the sources was due to allegations. Also, during Khan stay actress-model Gehana Vasisth claimed that Khan has been faking everything about her age, qualifications, and relationship with Shahid Afridi and is married to a 50-year-old man.

In 2018, Khan claimed that she was boosted out of Fear Factor: Khatron Ke Khiladi on Vikas Gupta behest and fan made theories comparing the situation Khan was in with Shilpa Shinde previous controversy with the referenced producer.

In 2021, Khan was criticised and trolled for copying Lady Gaga and wearing a rip-off of her 2020 MTV Video Music Awards dress at Bigg Boss 14 afterparty.

In March 2021, Khan was being criticised badly after posting a post about Mufti Menk and said that he's an Islamic salesman.

== Filmography ==
Year	Title	Language	Notes
2017	Malli Mishtu	Tamil	Tamil film debut
2014	The Last Emperor	Hindi	Hindi film debut

=== Television ===
Year	Title	Role	Notes
2017	Bigg Boss 11	Contestant	8th place
2018	Box Cricket League – Season 3	Contestant	Participant in Kolkata's Team
2018	Savitri Devi College & Hospital	Nayantara	
2019	Box Cricket League – Season 4	Contestant	Player for Ajmergarh Royals
2019	Vish	Kalankini	
2020–2021	Bigg Boss 14	Challenger	8th place
2023	Shravani	Julie	

=== Special appearances ===
Year	Title	Role
2018	Entertainment Ki Raat	Herself
2018	Ishq Mein Marjawan	Herself

=== Web series ===
Year	Series	Role	Notes	Ref
2020	Mary Aur Marlow	Mary		
2020	The Evil Desires	Kamini		
2021	Raat Ki Rani Begum Jaan	Begum Jaan	2021 Mail trial	

=== Music videos ===
Year	Title	Artist	Role
2017	Garamm Chulha Me Hat N Lagava	Priya, Rajesh Jha	Herself
2018	Gaddi Hai Meri Ferrari	Vicky Thakur	Herself
2019	Bandi	Vijay Varma	Herself
2019	Valentine Rose	Vicky Kajla	Herself
2019	Nain Nasheele	SB The Haryanvi	Herself
2019	Suit Patiyala	Akki Aryan	Herself
2019	Pyar Di ABC	Jaidev	Herself
2020	Chameli	Vijay Varma	Herself
2021	Krupa Rahu De	Rushikesh Shelar	Herself

== Awards and nominations ==
Year	Award	Category	Role	Result
2018	India Leadership Conclave	Indian Affairs Entertainer of the Year 2018	Herself	Won
2019	Kalakar Awards	Popular Internet Celebrity & Entertainer Of The Year 2019	Herself	Won
