= Entertainment Ki Raat =

- Genre: Reality
- Written by: Shobhit Sinha, Kousten Sahu, Raj verma, khalid azmi, Rishabh Kumar, Prajwal gupta
- Creative director: Nikul C. Desai
- Starring: See below
- Country of origin: India
- Original language: Hindi
- No. of seasons: 3
- No. of episodes: 38

Production
- Editor: Ved Satpathy
- Camera setup: Multi-camera
- Running time: 1 hour
- Production company: Optimystix Entertainment

Original release
- Network: Colors TV
- Release: 18 November 2017 – 27 May 2018

Entertainment Ki Raat is an Indian reality TV show on Colors TV. It was produced by Optimystix Entertainment India pvt. ltd and starred Ravi Dubey, Aditya Narayan, Dipika Kakkar Ibrahim, Malishka RJ, Balraj Sayal, Asha Negi, Divyansh Dwivedi, Keyan, Kavya, Raghu Ram.

== Cast ==
=== Season 1 ===
==== Main ====
- Ravi Dubey
- Asha Negi
- Raghu Ram
- Dipika Kakkar Ibrahim
  - Jigyasa Singh replaced Dipika
- Malishka RJ
- Balraj Syal
- Mubeen Saudagar
- Karan Wahi
- Aditya Narayan
- Neha Pendse
- Divyansh Dwivedi
- Keyan
- Kavya

=== Season 2 ===
==== Main ====
- Mubeen Saudagar
- Saumya Tandon
- Balraj Syal
- Divyansh Dwivedi
- Abhilash Thapliyal
- Neha Pendse
- Rubina Dilaik
- Karan Patel
- Karan Wahi
- Drashti Dhami
- Kavita Kaushik
- Shraddha Arya
- Hina Khan
- Vivian Dsena
- Shantanu Maheshwari
- Deepika Singh Goyal
- Karan Tacker
- Aly Goni

=== Season 3 ===
- Puneet J Pathak
- Harsh Limbachiyaa

== Description ==
Entertainment Ki Raat is latest reality TV show by Colors TV. Entertainment Ki Raat show has all kinds of entertaining segments including stand-up comedy, musical rapping, drop the mic, celebrity chat segment and many more, the show will prove to be an entertainment variety show.

The Tribune described the show as follows: "With its unique format that combines fiction and non-fiction, the show offers an array of components. From musical games to dance-offs to antakshari, the show has a lot to offer. The cook-offs will bring in some delicious moments, while the hidden camera pranks on celebrities are part of this show as well."

=== Rap battle ===
Drop the Mic is a part of the show hosted by Aditya Narayan, where two celebrity guests have to do a face-off by belittling each other sarcastically. They are to do so in the form of a rap. The first one to drop their mic will be declared the loser.

== Episodes ==
Season 1 aired from 18 November 2017 to 17 February 2018. Season 2 aired from 21 April 2018 to 27 May 2018.

=== Season 1 ===
No.	Guest(s)	Featured promotion	Original release date
1	Harbhajan Singh, Zareen Khan, Mouni Roy	Special guests	18 November 2017
2	Vidya Balan, Neha Dhupia, Manav Kaul	Tumhari Sulu	19 November 2017
3	Huma Qureshi, Mithali Raj, Jhulan Goswami,	Special guests	25 November 2017
4	Meera Deosthale, Aalisha Panwar, Rubina Dilaik, Arbaaz Khan, Sunny Leone, Dhinchak Pooja	Tera Intezaar	26 November 2017
5	Pulkit Samrat, Richa Chadda, Ali Fazal, Varun Sharma, Manjot Singh	Fukrey Returns	2 December 2017
6	Ravi Kishan, Pawan Singh, Guru Randhawa, Sargun Mehta	Special guests	3 December 2017
7	Jackie Shroff, Punit Pathak, Raghav Juyal	Special guests	9 December 2017
8	Pankaj Udhas, Anup Jalota, Talat Aziz	Special guests	10 December 2017
9	Daler Mehndi, Mika Singh	Special guests	16 December 2017
10	Irfan Pathan, Yusuf Pathan, Neha Kakkar, Sonu Kakkar	Special guests	17 December 2017
11	Juhi Chawla, Tabu	Special guests	23 December 2017
12	Salman Khan, Bigg Boss contestants	Special appearance	4 December 2017
13	Shakti Kapoor, Ranjeet, Anu Malik, Arshi Khan	Special appearance	30 December 2017
14	Dheeraj Dhoopar, Shraddha Arya, Karan Patel, Ankita Karan Patel, Jannat Zubair Rahmani, Ritvik Arora, Shraddha Arya	Special appearance	31 December 2017
15	Sohail Khan, Mallika Sherawat	Special guests	6 January 2018
16	Sukhwinder Singh, Ahmed Khan (choreographer), Neha Bhasin	Special guests	7 January 2018
17	Govinda, Sunita Ahuja, Tina Ahuja	Special guests	13 January 2018
18	Urvashi Rautela, Divya Khosla Kumar, Meet Bros	Special guests	20 January 2018
19	Shilpa Shinde, Vikas Gupta, Arshi Khan, Puneesh Sharma	Special guests	21 January 2018
20	Monali Thakur, Shankar Mahadevan	Rising star 2	27 January 2018
21	Shreyas Talpade, Tusshar Kapoor, Kunal Khemu	Special guests	28 January 2018
22	Taapsee Pannu, Saqib Saleem, Vijender Singh	Dil Juunglee	3 February 2018
23	Sonu Sood, Riteish Deshmukh	Guest appearance	4 February 2018
24	Amaal Mallik, Kartik Aaryan, Nushrat Bharucha Sunny Singh	Sonu Ke Titu Ki Sweety	10 February 2018
25	Sajid Khan, Swara Bhaskar	Guest appearance	11 February 2018
26	Manish Paul, Shaan, Tanisha Mukherjee, Sana Khan	N/A	17 February 2018

=== Season 2 ===
No.	Guest(s)	Featured promotion	Original release date
1	Sanjay Dutt	Special guests	21 April 2018
2	Farah Khan & Raveena Tandon	Special guests	22 April 2018
3	Shatrughan Sinha, Tony Kakkar, Neha Kakkar & Himansh Kohli	Special guests	28 April 2018
4	Raghav Juyal, Karan Singh Grover & Bipasha Basu	Special guests	29 April 2018
5	Terence Lewis & Geeta Kapoor	Special guests	5 May 2018
6	Karishma Kapoor & Ganesh Acharya	Special guests	6 May 2018
7	Dharmendra	Special guests	12 May 2018
8	Ayushmann Khurrana & Bhumi Pednekar	Special guests	13 May 2018
9	Bappi Lahiri & Dharmesh Yelande	Special guests	19 May 2018
10	Madhuri Dixit	Dance Deewane	20 May 2018
11	Karan Singh Grover, Ravi Dubey, Kunaal Roy Kapur, Manish Paul & Richa Sharma	3 Dev	26 May 2018
12	Ravi Kishan, Monali Thakur & Udit Narayan	Special guests	27 May 2018

=== Season 3 ===
Entertainment Ki Raat - Season 3
