= Ardh =

2022 Hindi film by Palash Muchhal

- Official release poster
- Directed by: Palash Muchhal
- Written by: Palash Muchhal
- Screenplay by: Palash Muchhal Mohammad Saifullah Tauheed
- Story by: Palash Muchhal
- Starring: Rajpal Yadav; Rubina Dilaik
- Cinematography: Parvez Pathan
- Edited by: Nitin Fcp
- Music by: Palash Muchhal
- Production companies: Pal Music and Films
- Distributed by: ZEE5
- Release date: 10 June 2022
- Country: India
- Language: Hindi

Ardh is an Indian Hindi-language drama film written and directed by Palash Muchhal. It stars Rajpal Yadav and Rubina Dilaik. The film premiered on ZEE5 on 10 June 2022.

== Story ==
Shiva, a struggling actor, has been trying to make it big in the film industry for many years, but has not been able to get his break. He decides to give Mumbai a try so he and his wife, Madhu, travel to Tinsel Town from their small hometown in Bihar. Life remains hard in the big city as well.

Shiva decides to disguise himself as a transgender woman and beg for money on the streets. He does this in order to support his family and to continue his dream of becoming an actor.

The film explores the ordeal of a struggling actor and the challenges faced by transgender people in India. It is a heartwarming story about love, sacrifice, and hope.

== Cast ==
- Rajpal Yadav as Shiva, also, as transgender (Parvati)
- Rubina Dilaik as Madhu
- Hiten Tejwani as Satya
- Kulbhushan Kharbanda as himself (Cameo Appearance)
- Swastik Tiwari as Aniruddh (Chintu)
- Hiten Tejwani as Satya
- Akashdeep Sabir as Kabir Sir

== Soundtrack ==
Ardh

Soundtrack album by Palash Munchal
- Released: 4 June 2022
- Recorded: 2021
- Genre: Feature film soundtrack
- Length: 28:47
- Language: Hindi
- Label: Zee Music Company

Official audio
- Ardh - Full Album on YouTube

The music of the film is composed by Palash Munchal with lyrics written by Palak Muchhal, Kunaal Vermaa, Palash Muchhal, Parry and Kuwar Virk.

No.	Title	Lyrics	Singer(s)Naina	Length
1.	"Ishq Ka Manjha"	Palak Muchhal	Palak Muchhal, Armaan Malik	4:34
2.	"Zindagi"	Kunaal Vermaa	Sonu Nigam	5:43
3.	"Zindagi" (Unplugged)	Kunaal Vermaa	Rekha Bhardwaj	6:31
4.	"Soja Chanda Re"	Palash Muchhal	Rubina Dilaik	3:00
5.	"Dum Ali"	Palash Muchhal	Divya Kumar, Amit Mishra	3:33
6.	"Ardh Theme"	Parry G	Parry G, Palash Muchhal	2:43
7.	"Peene Da Bahana"	Kuwar Virk	Shree D, Kuwar Virk	2:43
Total length:				28:47
