= Abhinav Shukla =

Indian actor (Born: 1982)

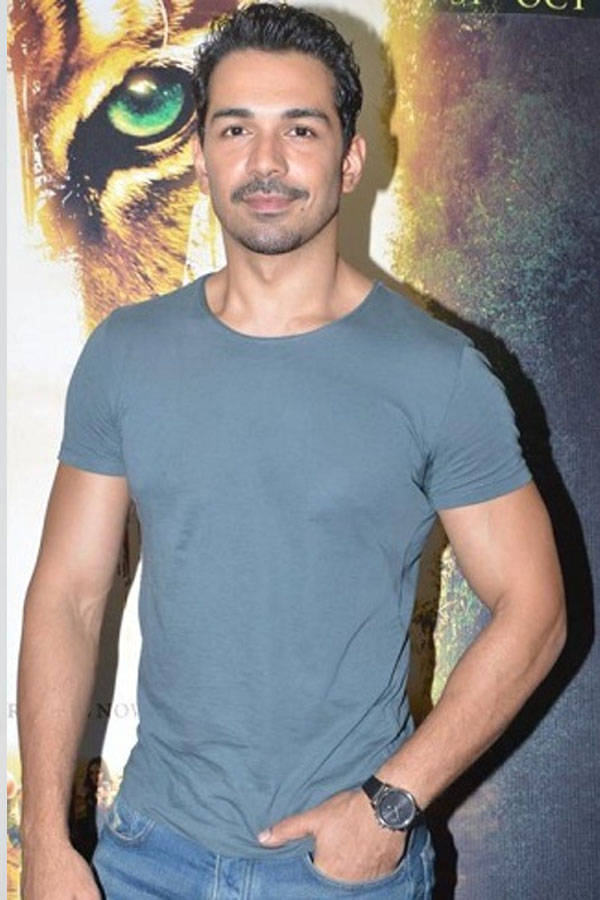
- Shukla in 2014
- Born: 27 September 1982 (age 43); Ludhiana, Punjab, India
- Occupation: Actor
- Years active: 2007–present
- Known for: Bigg Boss 14
- Spouse: Rubina Dilaik (m. 2018)
- Children: 2

Abhinav Shukla (born 27 September 1982) is an Indian actor who primarily works in Hindi television and films. He participated in Bigg Boss 14 and Fear Factor: Khatron Ke Khiladi 11 and emerged as semi finalist in the latter. Shukla emerged as the winner of the reality show Pati Patni Aur Panga.

== Early life and education ==
Shukla was born on 27 September 1982 in Ludhiana, Punjab. His father, Dr. K.K. Shukla, worked as an entomologist at Punjab Agricultural University in Ludhiana and his mother, Mrs. Radha Shukla was a teacher at Guru Nanak Public School (Sarabha Nagar, Ludhiana).

He graduated from Guru Nanak Public School in 2000, and completed his Bachelor of Technology in Electronics & Communication Engineering from Lala Lajpat Rai Institute of Engineering and Technology (Moga, Punjab) in 2004.

== Career ==
Shukla started his career in the Indian television industry with Jersey No. 10 in 2007. Later in 2008, he played Shantanu in Colors TV's Jaane Kya Baat Hui. In 2009, he played Vikram in Zee TV's Chotti Bahu. In 2010, he was cast in Star One's Geet – Hui Sabse Parayi where he plays the role of Dev. In 2011, he left the show and was replaced by Samir Sharma

In 2011 to 2012, Shukla then was a part of the show Ek Hazaaron Mein Meri Behna Hai where he played Dr. Manan Bisht. In January 2012, he participated in Survivor India as a contestant and was voted out in episode 21. In April 2012 he played Sumer in Zee TV's Hitler Didi.

In 2013, he played a cameo in Zee TV's show Badalte Rishton Ki Dastaan. In 2014, he made his Bollywood debut with the film Roar: Tigers of the Sundarbans starring opposite Nora Fatehi, which released in October. Later in December 2014, he participated in Box Cricket League in its first season. In 2015, he made an episodic appearance as Vikram in MTV Big F.

In 2016, he participated in the second season of Box Cricket League. Later he entered Star Plus's Diya Aur Baati Hum playing the role of Om. In 2017, he appeared in the Colors TV's Kasam Tere Pyaar Ki playing the role of Vishal. He later acted in the film Aksar 2 opposite Gautam Rode and Zarine Khan.

In 2018 he opted to play a negative role on Colors TV show Silsila Badalte Rishton Ka as Rajdeep. He however quit the show later in November. In 2019, he acted in Luka Chuppi which released in March. He later participated in Khatra Khatra Khatra. He directed a short film based on female-foeticide Bareilly Ki Beti: The Youngest Survivor starring his wife Rubina Dilaik.

In 2020, he along with his wife Rubina Dilaik entered Colors TV's Bigg Boss 14 as a contestant. He got evicted on Day 130. In 2025, Shukla participated in Colors TV's reality show, Pati Patni Aur Panga – Jodiyon Ka Reality Check along with his wife, Rubina Dilaik. The couple emerged as the winners of the series.

== Personal life ==
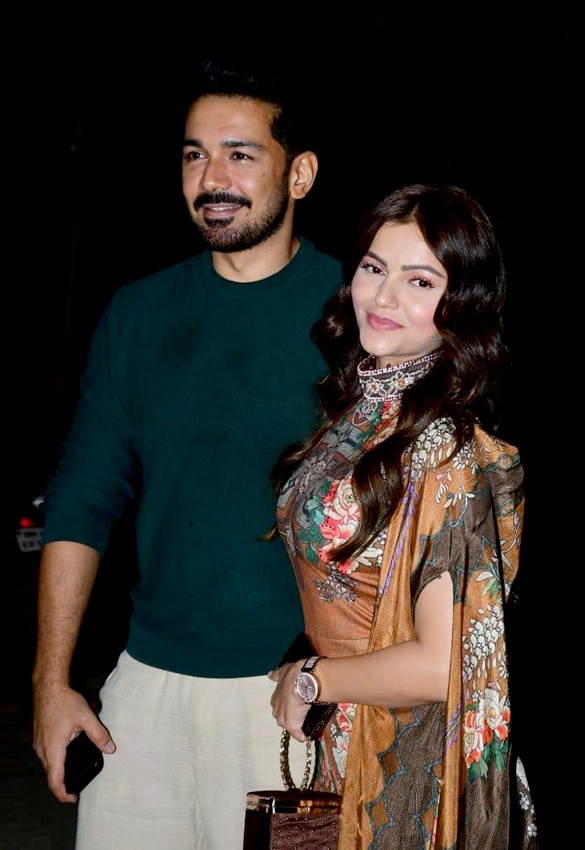
Shukla with wife Dilaik in 2022

Shukla married his longtime girlfriend, actress Rubina Dilaik on 21 June 2018 in Shimla. On Bigg Boss 14, it was revealed that his marriage with Dilaik was about to end and they gave each other six months before getting divorced. Post the show, they decided to continue their marriage. Shukla stated, "There's no divorce happening." They welcomed twin girls on 27 November 2023.

Shukla who is a self-confessed adventure lover successfully climbed the peak of Stok Kangri in pure Alpine style along with his brother on 23 July 2017 and announced that this marked his foray into mountaineering. In 2016 he along with his brother completed a 7-day trek from Chandra Taal to Bara-lacha la in alpine style. A year before he had cycled from Manali to Leh solo in six days.

He is known for his outdoor and adventure activities, whenever not shooting or working he likes to trek and camp out in the woods. On 4 January 2014 while on a trek to a fort in Matheran forests of Maharashtra he got stuck on a ledge of a rock face and had to be rescued by a team of rock climbers. He said he had mentally prepared himself for days of survival, even had stored his urine for emergency.

== In the media ==
Shukla was ranked at No. 11 in The Times of India's 20 Most Desirable Men on Television 2020.

== Filmography ==
=== Films ===
Year	Title	Role	Notes	Ref.
2014	Roar: Tigers of the Sundarbans	Pundit		
2017	Aksar 2	Ricky Khambata		
2018	Burning	Pritha's relative	Short film	
2019	Luka Chuppi	Nazeem Khan		

=== Television ===
Year	Title	Role	Notes	Ref.
2007	Jersey No. 10	Arjun Rai		
2008–2009	Jaane Kya Baat Hui	Shantanu Agnihotri		
2009–2010	Chotti Bahu	Vikram		
2010–2011	Geet – Hui Sabse Parayi	Dev Singh Khurana		
2011–2012	Ek Hazaaron Mein Meri Behna Hai	Dr. Manan Bisht		
2012	Hitler Didi	Sumer Singh Choudhary		
2012	Survivor India – The Ultimate Battle	Contestant	5th place	
2013	Badalte Rishton Ki Dastaan	Anirudh Balraj Asthana		
2016	Diya Aur Baati Hum	Om Rathi		
2018	Silsila Badalte Rishton Ka	Rajdeep Thakur		
2020–2021	Bigg Boss 14	Contestant	7th place	
2021	Khatron Ke Khiladi 11	Contestant	8th place	
2025	Pati Patni Aur Panga – Jodiyon Ka Reality Check	Contestant	Winner	

==== Special appearances ====
Year	Title	Role	Ref.
2014–2015	Box Cricket League 1	Himself	
2015	MTV Big F	NSG Commando Vikram Rathod	
2016	Box Cricket League 2	Himself	
2019	Khatra Khatra Khatra	Himself	

=== Web series ===
Year	Title	Role	Ref.
2022	Wanderlust	Himself	
2022	Cyber Vaar – Har Screen Crime Scene	Vikram	

=== Dubbing roles ===
Film title	Actor	Character	Dub language	Original language	Original year release	Dub year release	Notes
Sarileru Neekevvaru	Mahesh Babu	Major Ajay Krishna	Hindi	Telugu	2020	2022	The Hindi dub was titled: "Sarileru".
Race Gurram	Allu Arjun	Lakshman	Hindustani	Telugu	2014	2024	Sanket Mhatre dubbed this character in the Hindi dub.
Guntur Kaaram	Mahesh Babu	Bhogineni Veera Venkata Ramana alias "Rowdy" Ramana (TV dub)	Hindi	Telugu	2024	2025	A Hindi dub for TV by Goldmines Telefilms was also premiered on their own TV channel on 26 January 2025.

=== Music video appearances ===
Year	Title	Singer	Ref.
2015	"Main Rahoon Ya Na Rahoon"	Armaan Malik	
2021	"Marjaaneya"	Neha Kakkar	
2021	"Tumse Pyaar Hai"	Vishal Mishra	
2023	"Sanam Aa Gaya"	Payal Dev, Stebin Ben	

== Awards and nominations ==
Year	Award	Category	Work	Result	Ref.
2019	Indian Telly Awards	Best Actor in a Negative Role	Silsila Badalte Rishton Ka	Nominated	
2022	Indian Television Academy Awards	Popular Actor – OTT	Wanderlust	Nominated	
