= Radhe Maa =

Indian Hindu guru (born 1965)

- Born: Sukhvinder Kaur; 4 April 1965 (age 60); Gurdaspur district, Punjab, India
- Organization: Shri Radhe Guru Maa Charitable Trust
- Website: radhemaa.com

Sukhvinder Kaur (born 4 April 1965), better known as Radhe Maa, is an Indian guru and godwoman. She has been involved with families in Mukerian, Mumbai, Delhi, Haryana and abroad. She made her television debut as a guest on Bigg Boss 14.

== Early life ==
Sukhvinder Kaur was born in Dorangala village, Gurdaspur district in Punjab. Her followers state that she was drawn to spirituality as a child, and spent a lot of time at the Kali temple in her village. However, according to people of her village, she did not show any spiritual leanings as a child. Kaur studied till the 4th standard.

== As a spiritual leader ==
During her early years in Mumbai, Kaur used to frequently travel back to Hoshiarpur and Kapurthala in Punjab for satsang. Later she started giving out money to poor for gaining more followers in Mumbai, Delhi and other cities.

A lot of veteran Bollywood and TV actors are also reported to be bhakt (devotees) of Kaur.

Bollywood film director Subhash Ghai visited her to take her blessings.

In December 2017, Kaur was declared a "fraud" by Akhil Bharatiya Akhara Parishad, an organisation of Hindu Sants (saints) and Sadhus (ascetics) in India.

== Legal issues and controversies ==
In 2015, a woman named Niki Gupta filed a complaint alleging that Kaur had instigated her in-laws to harass her for dowry; in response, Kaur was granted anticipatory bail by the Bombay High Court, which directed her to cooperate with Kandivali police during the investigation.

In 2016, Kandivali police submitted a charge sheet in that dowry harassment case but omitted Kaur's name, citing lack of evidence.

In April 2017, the Bombay High Court asked the police to record the complainant's statement and reevaluate the probe.

In 2023, a sessions court rejected Kaur's plea to quash a defamation suit filed by Gupta, in which Gupta claimed that Kaur's remarks in a television interview had defamed her.
