= Silsila Badalte Rishton Ka =

Indian Hindi-language television drama series (2018)

- Genre: Drama; Romance
- Written by: Gajra Kottary
- Directed by: Ravi Bhushan
- Starring: See below
- Country of origin: India
- Original language: Hindi
- No. of seasons: 2
- No. of episodes: 295

Production
- Producer: Sunjoy Waddhwa
- Running time: Approximately 20 minutes
- Production company: Sphere Origins

Original release
- Network: Colors TV (4 June 2018 – 23 November 2018); Voot (26 November 2018 – 19 July 2019)
- Release: 4 June 2018 – 19 July 2019

Silsila Badalte Rishton Ka (transl. Sequence of Changing Relationships) is an Indian romantic drama series which premiered on 4 June 2018 on Colors TV. It was produced by Sunjoy Waddhwa for Sphere Origins. The show focused on how situations change relationships and the consequences of extramarital affairs. In 2018, the story revolved around Kunal's life with Nandini and Mauli played by Shakti Arora, Drashti Dhami and Aditi Sharma. In 2018, the show moved to digital platform Voot and in 2019, took a generation leap, focusing on Kunal's two daughters Mishti and Pari as well as Ruhaan played by Tejasswi Prakash, Aneri Vajani and Kunal Jaisingh.

The first season was about Kunal's life with Mauli and Nandini where Kunal and Nandini fall for each other while Mauli moves on in life with Ishaan played by Kinshuk Mahajan after divorcing Kunal. Second season was about both Kunal's daughters from his both wives Pari and Mishti It also focused on showing domestic violence against women by showcasing Nandini's husband, Rajdeep. The first season was first telecasted on Colors TV but later shifted to Voot. while the second season which focused on modern age youth, love and relationships was fully on digital streaming platform Voot.

== Series overview ==
Season	No. of episodes	Originally broadcast	
Season	No. of episodes	Series premiere	Series finale
1	196	4 June 2018	4 March 2019
2	99	5 March 2019	19 July 2019

== Plot ==
Mauli Srivastav and Nandini Verma are best friends, who grew up together. Nandini chooses Rajdeep, despite Mauli warning Nandini of his bad character, which leads to a fallout between the two and they part ways.

Mauli, who is now a gynaecologist, is married to Dr. Kunal Malhotra, who is a pediatrician. Married to Rajdeep, Nandini is a victim of domestic violence. An ambitious businessman and a dominating husband, Rajdeep often abuses Nandini, both physically and mentally.

Kunal sees Nandini at a medical conference and saves her from a major accident. He discovers she is the friend Mauli reminisces about. He discusses it with Mauli. She meets Nandini after seven years. Nandini informs Mauli of her pregnancy. Rajdeep beats Nandini upon hearing about her pregnancy and leaves her on a road. Kunal finds her and takes her to the hospital. Nandini miscarries.

With the support of Mauli and Kunal, she gets Rajdeep arrested on domestic abuse charges and begins to live in Mauli and Kunal's home. Kunal starts falling in love with Nandini. He reminds himself about Mauli but is unable to stop thinking about Nandini. Slowly, she begins to feel the same for Kunal and decides to leave town, due to her inability to control her romantic feelings for him.

When Kunal learns about this, he stops her and confesses his own romantic feelings. Nandini and Kunal start to love each other secretly. Mauli is heartbroken upon knowing this and wants to move out his house. Kunal's mother, Radhika stops her from leaving and forces Kunal to leave instead as he is the one, who is wrong. Kunal accepts his mistake and gets out of house. Mauli files for a divorce. After Kunal and Mauli part ways, Kunal and Nandini plan to get married. Mauli finds out that she is pregnant. Kunal discovers this, but due to a misunderstanding, he accuses her of faking the pregnancy. He marries Nandini and they move to London, well Mauli decides to go on by herself.

=== 6 years later ===
Mauli resides with her daughter, Mishti and her best friend, Ishaan Khanna. Kunal has just recently returned from London, accompanied by his and Nandini's daughter, Pari. But Kunal remains oblivious to the fact that, Mishti is actually his daughter. As fate would have it, Mishti and Pari become best friends, but they are completely oblivious to the fact that, they are actually half-sisters. When Kunal and Mauli unexpectedly encounter each other, both experience shock, filled, with unresolved emotional and awkward tension stemming from Kunal's past betrayal and the hurt that, he had inflicted on Mauli 6 years ago. Well Mauli is visiting a temple, she accidentally discovers that, Nandini has passed away, when she sees Kunal and Pari conducting Nandini's death anniversary. Heartbroken over her best friend, Nandini's demise, Mauli mourns her deeply, proving that, she still held Nandini dear, despite the anguish and betrayal from 6 years ago.

Mauli finally forgives Nandini, recognizing that, she was a good woman at heart, despite her mistakes, including having an affair, with Kunal, as it was actually a result of her emotions clouding her judgment and not stemming from any bad intentions at all. Mauli visits the same shrine that, Nandini had frequently visited, when she was still alive, the Dargah, as Mauli seeks closer. Well there, Mauli unexpectedly encounters Kunal and reveals that, she is aware of Nandini's death, which catches him off guard. Mauli inquires about the circumstances of Nandini's passing, Mauli learns that, Nandini had succumbed to advanced stage cancer 2 years ago. Kunal also shares that, even in her final days, Nandini often spoke of Mauli fondly, which devastates Mauli further, filling her, with guilt, shame and remorse for harboring anger towards Nandini so long, instead of forgiving her, when she had the chance. Another reason for her guilt stems from the fact that the last time that she saw Nandini alive, Mauli had said hurtful things in a moment of anger, which she had never actually meant at all.

Mauli realizes that, even, if some of her statements held truth, she still had no right to actually say, such harsh words at all. This guilt and remorse will remain a regret for Mauli throughout her life, as she mourns the inability to apologize to Nandini for the cruel things that, she had said to her 6 years ago. She wishes that, she could have seen her best friend one last time, before Nandini's passing. Later, Pari visits Mauli, after discovering the deep bond between her mother, Nandini and Mauli, and brings, with her an audio recording that, Nandini had made, during her final days.

Upon arriving at Mauli's house, Pari reveals her awareness of the friendship between Mauli and Nandini, much to Mauli's astonishment. Pari plays the audio recording containing Nandini's final message and her final wishes; Nandini expresses her apologies and seeks forgiveness from Mauli for the hurt that, she had caused 6 years ago. She also requests Mauli to care for Pari and to love her as, if she were her own daughter, providing her, with the motherly love. Overwhelmed, by emotions, Mauli weeps well listening to the entire recording, but also promises to honor her best friend, Nandini's final wish, embracing Pari as her own, and nurturing her, with love and care.

Kunal discovers that, Mishti is his daughter. But Mishti also learns that, Kunal is her father and becomes bitter towards him and Pari for having caused her mother's heartbreak. Ishaan proposes to Mauli. Kunal loses his memory in an accident and only remembers Mauli. She decided to stays, with him. After having visions of the past, Kunal finally regains his memory, and meets Pari and Mishti. Later, Mauli realizes her love for Ishaan and chooses him over Kunal. They both get married and soon have a son, named Ansh. Mishti finally forgives Kunal, but chooses Ishaan as her father and he adopts her.

=== 17 years later ===
Mishti, Pari and Ansh grow up, who all reside with Radhika. Mauli, Kunal, Ishaan and Yamini have all passed away. Mishti is a perfectionist, who believes in love and commitment, about to get engaged to her boyfriend, Veer. Pari is commitment phobic and easy going; her childhood friend Arnav loves her, but she does not love him at all. Mishti and Pari run an event-management company.

Pari gets fascinated, by Veer's friend, Ruhaan, who is attracted to Mishti. He develops a conflicting relation with Mishti and an easy going bond of friendship with Pari.

Mishti and Veer get engaged. Ruhaan tries to ignore his romantic feelings for her. Mishti is nervous sensing how she feels around Ruhaan and tries to push away her love.

Pari starts falling in love with Ruhaan. Arnav is heartbroken. Eventually, Mishti accepts her romantic feelings for Ruhaan. They confess their love to each other; she breaks up with Veer, who informs Pari about Mishti and Ruhaan's relationship hoping to cause problems between them. Upon knowing that Pari has eomantic feelings for Ruhaan, Mishti decides to sacrifice her love.

Mishti denies having romantic feelings for Ruhaan, by faking to get back with Veer. Pari proposes to Ruhaan, but is heartbroken, when he rejects her. Ruhaan questions Mishti's sacrifice. She is adamant. Later, after many discussions, Mishti-Veer's and Pari-Ruhaan's marriage is fixed. On the wedding day, Mishti faints and is diagnosed with lupus. Pari learns about Mishti and Ruhaan's love for each other, and donates her kidney to save Mishti.

Mishti and Ruhaan get married, and move into a new house in same apartment. Pari finally accepts Arnav's love, hinting that she might develop romantic feelings for him too. Mishti, Pari, Ruhaan, Ansh and Arnav celebrate together, with Radhika.

== Cast ==
=== Main ===
- Aditi Sharma as Dr. Mauli Srivastav Khanna: An honest gynaecologist; Jyoti's daughter; Mayank's sister; Nandini's childhood best friend; Kunal's ex-wife; Ishaan's wife; Mishti and Ansh's mother; Pari's foster mother and step-mother; Rajdeep's enemy (2018–2019; dead)
- Shakti Arora as Dr. Kunal Malhotra: An honest pediatrician; Radhika's son; Mauli's ex-husband; Nandini's husband; Mishti and Pari's father; Rajdeep's enemy (2018–2019; dead)
- Drashti Dhami as Nandini Verma Malhotra: Mauli's childhood best friend; Kunal's wife; Rajdeep's enemy and ex-wife; Pari's mother; Mishti's step-mother (2018; dead)
- Kinshuk Mahajan as Ishaan Khanna: An honest businessman; Sandhya's son; Mauli's husband; Ansh's father; Mishti's foster father and step-father (2018-2019; dead)
- Abhinav Shukla as Rajdeep Thakur: A dishonest businessman and criminal; Parvati's son; Nandini's abusive ex-husband and enemy; Kunal and Mauli's enemy (2018; incarcerated)
- Tejasswi Prakash as Mishti Khanna: An honest businesswoman; Mauli and Kunal's daughter; Ishaan and Nandini's step-daughter; Pari and Ansh's half-sister; Veer's ex-fiancée; Ruhaan's wife (2019)
  - Maisha Dixit as child Mishti (2018–2019)
- Aneri Vajani as Pari Malhotra: An honest businesswoman; Nandini and Kunal's daughter; Mauli's foster daughter; Mishti's half-sister; Ansh's foster sister; Arnav childhood best friend and love interest (2019)
  - Arravya Sharma as child Pari (2018–2019)
- Kunal Jaisingh as Ruhaan: Veer's childhood friend; Mishti's husband (2019)
- Rohan Gandotra as Veer Verma: Naina and Sushant's son; Mishti's ex-fiancé (2019)

=== Recurring ===
- Jaya Bhattacharya as Radhika Malhotra: Kunal's mother; Mishti and Pari's grandmother; Ansh's foster grandmother (2018–2019)
- Akshit Sukhija as Arnav: Sue's nephew; Taani's brother; Pari's childhood best friend and love interest (2019)
- Dolly Minhas as Sukhmani aka Sue: Arnav and Taani's aunt (2019)
- Siddharth Tamboli as Ansh Khanna: Mauli and Ishaan's son; Mishti's half-brother; Pari's foster brother (2019)
  - Evan Dixit as baby Ansh (2019)
- Mishmee Das as Taani: Sue's niece; Arnav's sister (2019)
- Neena Cheema as Yamini Malhotra: Kunal's grandmother; Mishti and Pari's great-grandmother; Ansh's foster great-grandmother (2018–2019; dead)
- Abigail Jain as Mehak: Kunal's friend; Pari's caretaker (2018)
- Prateeksha Lonkar as Sandhya Khanna: Ishaan's mother; Ansh's grandmother; Mishti's step-grandmother (2018–2019)
- Roma Bali as Jyoti Srivastav: Mauli and Mayank's mother; Mishti and Ansh's grandmother; Mishti's step-grandmother (2018)
- Raj Singh Suryavanshi as Mayank Srivastav: Jyoti's son; Mauli's brother (2018)
- Bindiya Kalra as Naina Verma: Sushant's wife; Veer's mother (2019)
- Farooq Saeed as Sushant Verma: Naina's husband; Veer's father (2019)
- Prachi Kowli as Sweety Khanna: The Malhotras' neighbour (2018–2019)
- Arjun Aneja as Manas Ahuja: Mauli and Nandini's college friend (2018)

=== Guests ===
- Harshad Chopda as Aditya Hooda from Bepannah
- Jennifer Winget as Zoya Hooda from Bepannah
- Vijayendra Kumeria as Suraj Rajvanshi from Ishq Mein Marjawan
- Meera Deosthale as Chakor Rajvanshi from Udaan
- Ritvik Arora as Ahaan Dhanrajgir from Tu Aashiqui
- Jannat Zubair Rahmani as Pankti Dhanrajgir from Tu Aashiqui
- Shivin Narang as Jai Mittal from Internet Wala Love
- Tunisha Sharma as Aadhya Verma from Internet Wala Love
- Arjun Bijlani as Deep Raj Singh from Ishq Mein Marjawan
- Aalisha Panwar as Tara Raj Singh from Ishq Mein Marjawan
- Nia Sharma as Aarohi Raj Singh from Ishq Mein Marjawan
- Vineet Raina as Virat Raichand from Ishq Mein Marjawan
- Varun Dhawan, Alia Bhatt and Aditya Roy Kapur to promote their film Kalank
- Salman Khan to promote their upcoming film Bharat
- Shahid Kapoor and Kiara Advani to promote their upcoming film Kabir Singh

== Production ==
=== Casting ===
Initially, Devoleena Bhattacharjee was selected to play Nandini but the role went to Drashti Dhami. Similarly, Sukirti Kandpal was selected to play Dr Mauli but Aditi Sharma got the role. Likewise, although Aham Sharma was selected to play Rajdeep, Abhinav Shukla was later chosen.

=== Writing and development ===
The serial was named 'Bawre Nain' but the makers changed the title to 'Silsila Badalte Rishton Ka'.

Dhami stated that the serial is not about extra marital affairs but it focus on the friendship between two friends and two couples and how circumstances takes place in their lives.

Before the launch of the series, Manisha Sharma, programming head of Colors, stated that:

With this show, we are exploring an evolved and modern love story. The twist and turns every relationship goes through often complicates situations making the person break boundaries. This complicated yet interesting space will keep everyone intrigued and engaged, with viewers contemplating the difference between what feels right and what seems wrong.

== Reception ==
=== Critical reception ===
Shweta Ksheri of India Today wrote, "Drashti Dhami nails it as the tormented wife; a good comeback for the actress." Soumyata Chauhan of DNA India wrote: "Shakti-Aditi's sizzling romance perfectly off-sets Drashti Dhami's abusive marriage." Shruti Shiksha of NDTV wrote: "The show is a good take on new-age friendship, love and marriage". The Times of India stated, "Silsila Badalte Rishton Ka has managed to grab the attention of the viewers for its unique storyline and bold content".

== Controversy ==
In the beginning, the makers and Drashti Dhami told that the series was not about extra marital affairs but how circumstances takes place in couples lives and channel programming head of Colors stated that the serial is about exploring an evolved and modern love story.

In September 2018, some audiences were not happy about the storyline and blamed the makers and main cast for showing extra marital affairs content on national television.

They started to troll on the main cast of the series on social networking sites.
