= Rubina Dilaik =

Indian actress (born 1987)

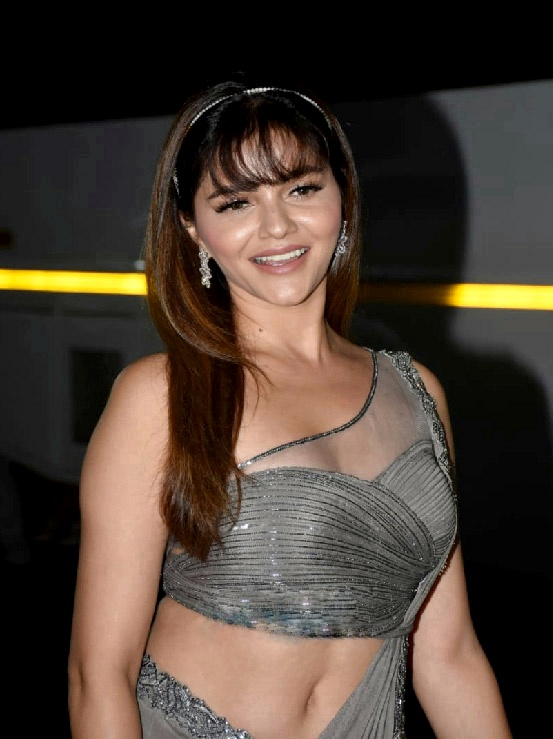
- Dilaik in 2021
- Born: 26 August 1987 (age 39); Shimla, Himachal Pradesh, India
- Education: St. Bede's College, Shimla
- Occupation: Actress
- Years active: 2008–present
- Known for: Chotti Bahu; Shakti – Astitva Ke Ehsaas Ki; Bigg Boss 14
- Spouse: Abhinav Shukla (m. 2018)
- Children: 2

Rubina Dilaik (pronounced [ɾuːˈbiːna dɪˈleːk]; born 26 August 1987) is an Indian actress who primarily works in Hindi television. One of the highest-paid television actresses in India, she is a recipient of several accolades including an ITA Award and a Gold Award. Dilaik is widely recognised for her portrayal of Radhika in Chotti Bahu and Soumya in Shakti – Astitva Ke Ehsaas Ki. She is also the winner of the reality shows Bigg Boss 14 and Pati Patni Aur Panga. She expanded to Hindi films with Palash Muchhal's Ardh (2022).

== Early life and work ==
Dilaik was born on 26 August 1987 in Shimla, Himachal Pradesh. She studied at Shimla Public School and St. Bede's College, Shimla. Her father is also a writer and has written many books in Hindi.

In her early days, she was a beauty pageant contender for which she won two local beauty pageants and was crowned Miss Shimla in 2006. She was a national-level champion in debate during her school days. She is a graduate with a degree in English literature with minors in Political science. In 2008, she won the Miss North India Pageant held at Chandigarh.

== Career ==
=== Debut and breakthrough (2008–2013) ===
She started her acting career from Chotti Bahu though she wanted to be an IAS and was preparing but was selected in auditions in Chandigarh. Dilaik gained recognition by playing Radhika Shastri in Zee TV's Chotti Bahu opposite Avinash Sachdev and reprising the role in the show's sequel. In 2012, she played Simran "Smiley" Gill in Sony TV's Saas Bina Sasural.

In 2013, she played Divya Jakhotia in Zee TV's Punar Vivah – Ek Nayi Umeed opposite Karan Grover.

=== Success and acclaim (2013–2020) ===
From 2013 to 2014, she portrayed Sita in Life OK's mythological show Devon Ke Dev...Mahadev and Jeannie in SAB TV's Jeannie Aur Juju.

From June 2016 to January 2020, Dilaik portrayed Soumya Singh, a trans woman in Colors TV's long-running popular show Shakti – Astitva Ke Ehsaas Ki opposite Vivian Dsena, for which she was awarded for Best Personality in Colors' Golden Petal Awards 2017 and Best Actress in ITA Awards 2017. She returned to the series in March 2021, which went off air in late 2021. It proved a turning point in her career.

=== Bigg Boss 14 and beyond (2020–present) ===
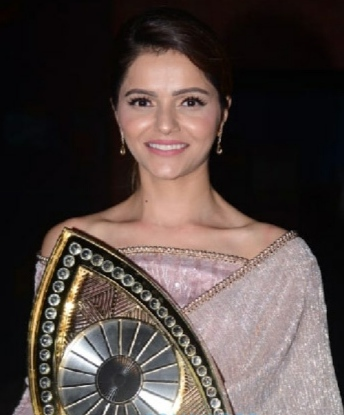
Dilaik at Bigg Boss finale

In October 2020, Dilaik entered as a contestant in the fourteenth season of Bigg Boss, the Indian version of the reality TV show Big Brother. She took part in the house along with her husband Abhinav Shukla. She stayed in the house for twenty weeks and emerged as the winner.

In 2022, Dilaik participated in Fear Factor: Khatron Ke Khiladi 12.

Dilaik made her Hindi film debut with Ardh in 2022 alongside Rajpal Yadav and Hiten Tejwani. It marks the directorial debut of music composer-singer Palash Muchhal. Rubina was chosen over 50 other girls during the look-test for the film. Ardh released digitally on ZEE5 on 10 June 2022 and received positive reviews from critics.

In 2022, she participated in Jhalak Dikhhla Jaa 10, where she ended up becoming the 1st runner-up. In 2025, Dilaik participated in Colors TV's reality show, Pati Patni Aur Panga – Jodiyon Ka Reality Check along with her husband, Abhinav Shukla. The couple emerged as the winners of the series.

== Personal life ==
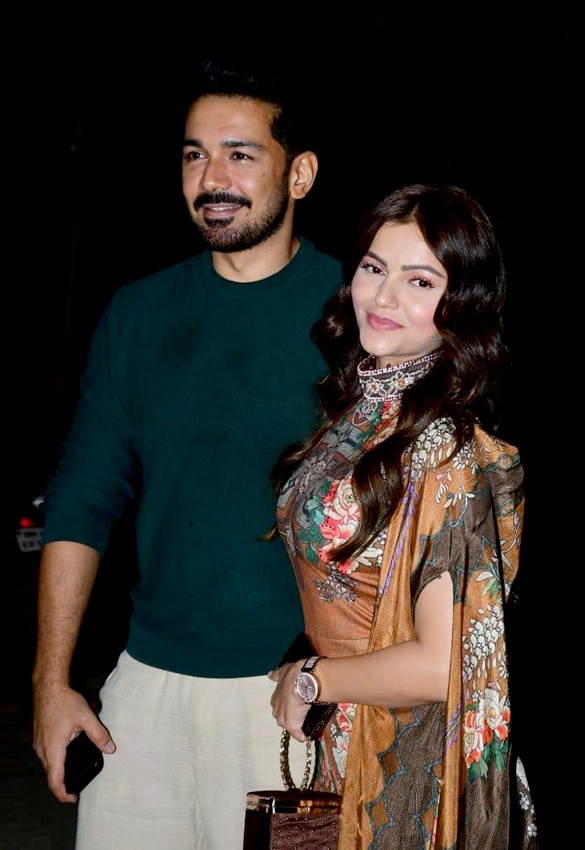
Dilaik with husband in 2022

Dilaik married her longtime boyfriend, actor Abhinav Shukla on 21 June 2018 in Shimla. Dilaik revealed it on Bigg Boss 14 that her marriage with Shukla was falling apart before they entered the show. She also revealed that they had given six months to each other before their divorce. However, after the show, they decided to continue their marriage while her husband said, "there's no divorce happening". The couple welcomed twin girls on 27 November 2023, Jeeva and Edhaa.

== Other work and public image ==
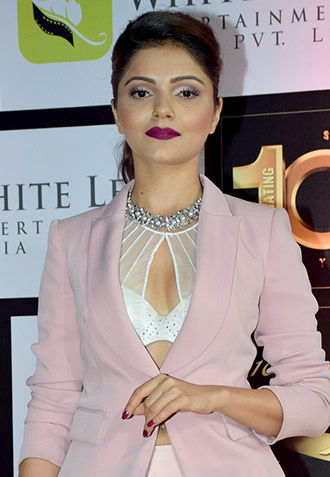
Dilaik in 2017

Dilaik's acting performances in Chotti Bahu, Punar Vivah – Ek Nayi Umeed, Jeannie Aur Juju and Shakti – Astitva Ke Ehsaas Ki, established her among the popular and highest-paid actresses of Hindi television. Eastern Eye has credited Dilaik's "fast-growing fanbase", "fantastic talent and fearless approach", as a reason of her success. She is known for portraying powerful roles on-screen. In 2017, for her performance as Saumya, The Indian Express placed her at third position in its "Top 10 television actresses" list.

Dilaik has frequently appeared in Eastern Eye's Top 50 Sexiest Asian Women List. She ranked 26th in 2013, 11th in 2016 and 10th in 2017. Dilaik ranked 18th in 2017 and 10th in 2020, in Times 20 Most Desirable Women on TV List. In 2022, Dilaik was placed 31st in Eastern Eye's "Top 50 Asian Stars" list. In 2023, she ranked 7th in Times Now "Popular Actresses" list.

Dilaik has been supporting LGBTQ community since her portrayal of a transgender in Shakti – Astitva Ke Ehsaas Ki. Her Bigg Boss 14's winning gown and other gowns she wore on the show were sold for charity to support the LGBTQIA+ community, in commemoration of Pride Month in June 2021. Dilaik is also one of the most-followed Indian television actresses in Instagram.

== Filmography ==
=== Films ===
Key
†	Denotes films that have not yet been released

Year	Title	Role	Language	Notes	Ref.
2020	Bareilly Ki Beti: The Youngest Survivor	Mother	Hindi	Short film	
2022	Ardh	Madhu	Hindi	Debuted in Bollywood	
2024	Chal Bhajj Chaliye	Prabh	Punjabi		
TBA	Hum Tum Maktoob †	TBA	Hindi	Filming	

=== Television ===
Year	Title	Role	Notes	Ref.
2008–2010	Chotti Bahu	Radhika Shastri	Main role	
2011–2012	Chotti Bahu 2	Radhika/Ruby Bhardwaj	Main role	
2012	Saas Bina Sasural	Simran Gill		
2013	Punar Vivah – Ek Nayi Umeed	Divya Malhotra	Main role	
2013–2014	Devon Ke Dev...Mahadev	Sita	Main role	
2013–2014	Jeannie Aur Juju	Jeannie	Main role	
2016–2020; 2021	Shakti – Astitva Ke Ehsaas Ki	Soumya Singh	Main role	
2020–2021	Bigg Boss 14	Contestant	Winner	
2022	Fear Factor: Khatron Ke Khiladi 12	Contestant	5th place	
2022	Jhalak Dikhhla Jaa 10	Contestant	1st runner up	
2023	Entertainment Ki Raat Housefull	Host		
2025	Laughter Chefs – Unlimited Entertainment	Contestant	Season 2	
2025	Pati Patni Aur Panga – Jodiyon Ka Reality Check	Contestant	Winner	
2026	Khatron Ke Khiladi 15	Contestant	6th Place	

==== Special appearances ====
Year	Title	Role	Ref.
2008	Banno Main Teri Dulhan	Radhika	
2008	Kasamh Se	Radhika	
2009	Saat Phere – Saloni Ka Safar	Radhika	
2010	Pavitra Rishta	Radhika	
2010	Nachle Ve with Saroj Khan	Herself	
2013	Sapne Suhane Ladakpan Ke	Herself	
2014/2015	Box Cricket League	Herself	
2016	Bigg Boss 10	Soumya	
2017	Sasural Simar Ka	Soumya	
2017	Savitri Devi College & Hospital	Soumya	
2017	Bigg Boss 11	Soumya	
2017	Entertainment Ki Raat	Soumya	
2018	Tu Aashiqui	Soumya	
2018	Ishq Mein Marjawan	Soumya	
2018	Bigg Boss 12	Soumya	
2019	Khatra Khatra Khatra	Herself	
2019	Bigg Boss 13	Herself	
2021	Dance Deewane 3	Herself	
2021	Fear Factor: Khatron Ke Khiladi 11	Herself	
2021	Bigg Boss OTT 1	Herself	
2022	Bigg Boss 15	Herself	
2022	The Khatra Khatra Show	Herself	
2022	Saavi Ki Saavari	Herself	
2024	Bigg Boss 18	Herself	
2026	Laughter Chefs – Unlimited Entertainment season 3	Herself	

=== Web series ===
Year	Title	Role	Notes	Ref.
2022	Wanderlust	Herself		
2025	Battleground	Herself	Mentor of Mumbai Strikers	
2026	The Ward	Herself	Host	

=== Music video appearances ===
Year	Title	Singer(s)	Ref.
2021	"Boss Lady Rubina"	Roach Killa	
2021	"Marjaneya"	Neha Kakkar	
2021	"Galat"	Asees Kaur	
2021	"Tumse Pyaar Hai"	Vishal Mishra	
2021	"Bheeg Jaunga"	Stebin Ben	
2021	"Shah Rukh Khan"	Inder Chahal	
2022	"Ishq"	Sarthi K	
2023	"Sanam Aa Gaya"	Payal Dev, Stebin Ben	

== Accolades ==
=== Television awards ===
Year	Award	Category	Work	Result	Ref.
2009	Indian Telly Awards	Fresh New Face Female	Chotti Bahu	Nominated	
2010	Gold Awards	Debut in a Lead Role Female	Chotti Bahu	Nominated	
2016	Indian Television Academy Awards	Best Actress Drama Jury	Shakti – Astitva Ke Ehsaas Ki	Won	
2016	Indian Television Academy Awards	Best Actress Drama Popular	Shakti – Astitva Ke Ehsaas Ki	Nominated	
2017	Asian Viewers Television Awards	Female Actor of the Year	Shakti – Astitva Ke Ehsaas Ki	Nominated	
2018	Indian Television Academy Awards	Best Actress Drama Popular	Shakti – Astitva Ke Ehsaas Ki	Nominated	
2018	Gold Awards	Best Actress in a Lead Role	Shakti – Astitva Ke Ehsaas Ki	Nominated	
2019	Gold Awards	Best Actress in a Lead Role	Shakti – Astitva Ke Ehsaas Ki	Nominated	
2019	Indian Telly Awards	Best Actress in a Lead Role	Shakti – Astitva Ke Ehsaas Ki	Nominated	
2022	Indian Television Academy Awards	Popular Actress OTT	Wanderlust	Nominated	
2023	Nickelodeon Kids' Choice Awards India	Favourite TV Actress	Khatron Ke Khiladi 12	Won	

=== Other awards ===
Year	Award	Category	Result	Ref.
2017	Gold Awards	Most Fit Actress	Won	
2023	Bollywood Hungama Style Icons	Most Stylish TV Star Female	Nominated	

== See also ==
- List of Indian television actresses
- List of Hindi television actresses
- List of Hindi film actresses
