= Sonali Phogat =

Indian politician (1979–2022)

- Portrait of Phogat
- Born: 21 September 1979; Haryana, India
- Died: 23 August 2022 (aged 42); Goa, India
- Occupations: Politician; social media personality
- Spouse(s): Sanjay Phogat (died 2016)
- Children: 1

Sonali Phogat (21 September 1979 – 23 August 2022) was an Indian politician and former social media personality. She was a leader in the Bharatiya Janata Party (BJP) from Hisar, Haryana, and was the national vice president of BJP's women's wing, BJP Mahila Morcha. She has also been credited in Hindi-language movies. In 2020, she participated in Bigg Boss 14.

== Career ==
=== Politics ===
Sonali Phogat became the national vice president of BJP Mahila Morcha, the women's wing of the Bharatiya Janata Party, in 2008. She contested Haryana Assembly elections in 2019 as BJP candidate from the Adampur constituency Haryana Assembly election against Kuldeep Bishnoi.

=== Television ===
Phogat started her professional career by anchoring in Hisar Doordarshan. In 2020, she competed in the reality show Big Boss 14 where she was evicted in 10th place.

== Personal life ==
Sonali Phogat was born in a small village in the Hisar district of Haryana named Bhuthan. She was married to Sanjay Phogat who died in 2016 and has a daughter, Yashodhara Phogat.

== Death ==
Phogat died on 23 August 2022 during a trip in the state of Goa. Her family alleged that she had been murdered.
