= Kinshuk Mahajan =

Indian actor (born 1986)

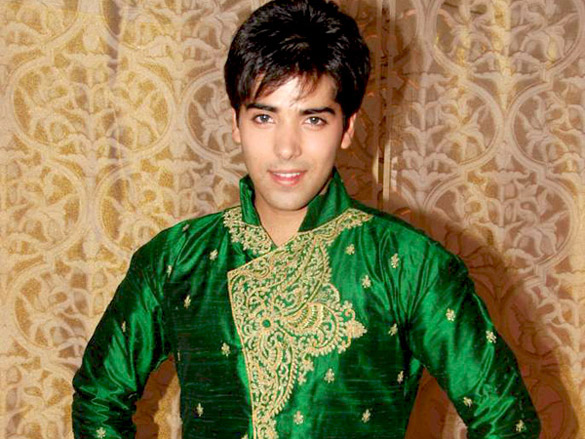
- Mahajan in 2014
- Born: Kinshuk Mahajan; 17 April 1986 (age 40); Delhi, India
- Education: Asian Academy of Film and Television, Noida
- Occupations: Actor; model
- Years active: 2007–present
- Known for: Sapna Babul Ka... Bidaai; Pandya Store
- Spouse: Divya Gupta (m. 2011)
- Children: 2

Kinshuk Mahajan (born 17 April 1986) is an Indian actor who primarily works in Hindi television. He is known for his portrayal of Ranveer Rajvansh in Sapna Babul Ka... Bidaai and Gautam Pandya in Pandya Store. He is a recipient of an Indian Telly Award and a Gold Award

Mahajan made his acting debut with the film Delhii Heights and his TV debut with Dhoom Machaao Dhoom, portraying Adiraj Sherawat, both in 2007. He then portrayed Viren Sood in Chand Chupa Badal Mein. His other notable work include portraying Rudra in Naagin 2, Ishaan Khanna in Silsila Badalte Rishton Ka and Manoj Kohli in Megha Barsenge.

== Early life and education ==
Kinshuk Mahajan was born on 17 April 1986 in New Delhi. He completed his schooling from Delhi Public School, Noida. Mahajan then completed his graduation from the Asian Academy of Film and Television, Noida.

== Personal life ==
Mahajan got engaged to his longtime girlfriend Divya Gupta in 2010. He married Gupta on 12 November 2011, in Delhi. On 7 October 2017, they had twins, named Ssahir and Saishaa.

== Career ==
=== Debut and breakthrough (2007-2013) ===
Mahajan made his acting debut in 2007 with the Hindi film, Delhii Heights. The same year, he made his TV debut with Dhoom Machaao Dhoom, portraying Adiraj Sherawat from 2007 to 2008. It was his first major appearance.

In 2007, he also portrayed Devendra opposite Chahat Khanna in Kaajjal. He then portrayed Kamal Thakral in Bhabhi.

From 2008 to 2010, he portrayed Ranveer Rajvansh in Sapna Babul Ka... Bidaai, opposite Parul Chauhan. It proved as a major turning point in his career. Mahajan won Gold Award for Debut in a Lead Role (Male) for his performance.

From 2010 to 2011, Mahanjan portrayed Viren Sood opposite Neha Sargam in Chand Chupa Badal Mein. The show was introduced by Javed Akhtar.

From 2011 to 2012, he portrayed Pintu Singh in Afsar Bitiya, opposite Mitali Nag. In 2011, he participated as a Contestant on the travel show, Jee Le Ye Pal.

=== Expansion and various roles (2014-2019) ===
In 2014, Mahajan portrayed Inspector Vinod More in Encounter. From 2014 to 2015, he portrayed Abhimanyu Maheshwari, opposite Shefali Sharma in Tum Aise Hi Rehna.

In 2015, he portrayed Tilak Rajawat in Tere Sheher Mein opposite Hiba Nawab. From 2015 to 2016, he portrayed Ashok and Uday in two episodes of Savdhaan India.

In 2016, he portrayed Karan in an episode of Pyaar Tune Kya Kiya. From 2016 to 2017, Mahajan portrayed Rudra, a shape-shifting serpent opposite Mouni Roy in Naagin 2.

Mahajan portrayed Vivek in 2017, in Jaana Na Dil Se Door. From 2017 to 2018, he portrayed Aarav Randhawa in Bhootu, opposite Sana Amin Sheikh.

From 2018 to 2019, Mahajan portrayed Veer opposite Sana Saeed and Suyyash opposite Parvati Sehgal in two episodes of Laal Ishq.

He portrayed Ishaan Khanna opposite Aditi Sharma in Silsila Badalte Rishton Ka from 2018 to 2019. In 2019, he portrayed Akshay Kapoor in Gathbandhan opposite Shruti Sharma.

=== Success and recent work (2020-present) ===
Mahajan earned wider recognition and praises with his portrayal of Gautam Pandya in Pandya Store, opposite Shiny Doshi. From January 2022 to July 2023, he portraying Gautam Pandya. Later in 2022, he reprised Gautam Pandya in the game show Ravivaar With Star Parivaar.

From August 2024 to June 2025, Mahajan is seen portraying Manoj Kohli in Megha Barsenge opposite Neha Rana.

== Filmography ==
=== Films ===
Year	Title	Role	Notes	Ref.
2007	Delhii Heights	Kinshuk		

=== Television ===
Year	Serial	Role	Notes	Ref.
2007	Bhabhi	Kamal Thakral	Supporting Role	
2007	Kaajjal	Devendra "Dev"	Lead Role	
2007–2008	Dhoom Machaao Dhoom	Adiraj "Addy" Sherawat	Supporting Role	
2008–2010	Sapna Babul Ka... Bidaai	Ranveer Rajvansh	Lead Role	
2010–2011	Chand Chupa Badal Mein	Viren Sood	Lead Role	
2011–2012	Afsar Bitiya	Pintu Singh	Lead Role	
2014	Encounter	Inspector Vinod More	Episode 13 to Episode 15	
2014–2015	Tum Aise Hi Rehna	Abhimanyu Maheshwari	Lead Role	
2015	Savdhaan India	Ashok	Episode 1138	
2015	Tere Sheher Mein	Tilak Rajawat	Negative Role	
2016	Pyaar Tune Kya Kiya	Karan	Season 7 – Episode 6	
2016	Savdhaan India	Uday	Episode 1775	
2016–2017	Naagin 2	Rudra	Supporting Role	
2017	Jaana Na Dil Se Door	Vivek	Cameo Role	
2017–2018	Bhutu	Aarav Randhawa	Lead Role	
2018	Laal Ishq – Baba Bangali	Veer	Episode 19	
2018–2019	Silsila Badalte Rishton Ka	Ishaan Khanna	positive Role	
2019	Laal Ishq – Jeeva	Suyash	Episode 109	
2019	Gathbandhan	Akshay Kapoor	Negative Role	
2021–2023	Pandya Store	Gautam "Gomby" Pandya	Lead Role	
2022	Ravivaar With Star Parivaar	Gautam "Gomby" Pandya	Episode 1/6/13/14/16	
2024–2025	Megha Barsenge	Manoj Kohli	Negative Role	
2026–present	Bareilly Ke Bacchan	Ganga Bacchan		

==== Special appearances ====
Year	Title	Role	Ref.
2009	Yeh Rishta Kya Kehlata Hai	Ranveer Rajvansh	
2014	Itti Si Khushi	Abhimanyu Maheshwari	
2014	Hum Hain Na	Himself	
2019	Shaadi Ho To Aisi	Akshay Kapoor	
2026	Mahadev & Sons	Ganga Bacchan	

== Accolades ==
Year	Award	Category	Work	Result	Ref.
2008	Indian Telly Awards	Fresh New Face - Male	Sapna Babul Ka...Bidaai	Nominated	
2008	Gold Awards	Debut in a Lead Role – Male	Sapna Babul Ka...Bidaai	Won	
2022	Indian Television Academy Awards	Popular Actor (Drama)	Pandya Store	Nominated	
2023	Indian Telly Awards	Best Actor in a Lead Role	Pandya Store	Nominated	
2023	Indian Telly Awards	Fan Favorite Actor	Pandya Store	Nominated	
2025	Indian Telly Awards	Fan Favorite – Negative Actor	Megha Barsenge	Won	

== See also ==
- List of Indian television actors
