= Maryada: Lekin Kab Tak? =

- Written by: Damini Kanwal Shetty; Raaj Shetty; Sanjay Shabd Kumar
- Directed by: Waseem Sabir; Imtiaz Punjabi; Iqbal Rizvi; Khalid Akhtar
- Creative directors: Raaj Shetty; Damini Kanwal Shetty; Manjari Mukul; Pooja Tiwari
- Starring: Raqesh Bapat; Riddhi Dogra; Kamya Panjabi
- Country of origin: India
- Original language: Hindi
- No. of seasons: 1
- No. of episodes: 396

Production
- Producers: Tony Singh; Deeya Singh
- Running time: 24 minutes
- Production company: DJ's a Creative Unit

Original release
- Network: Star Plus
- Release: 18 October 2010 – 13 April 2012

Maryada...Lekin Kab Tak? (transl. Keeping Our Limits... But Until When?) is an Indian television drama that premiered on 18 October 2010 and ended on 13 April 2012 on Star Plus. The show is produced by Tony and Deeya Singh of DJ's a Creative Unit.

The show centres on the lives of four women from the same family: Priya, Devyani (eventually Priya's mother-in-law), Uttara (Devyani's sister) and Vidya (Devyani's daughter-in-law). Initially, it focuses on the character of Uttara and the trials she faces in her abusive marriage to her alcoholic husband. The show later revolves around Brahmanand Jakhar, a corrupt police officer and Uttara's betrayal to her sister by marrying Brahmanand religiously.

== Plot ==
Uttara Bindra is married to Rishabh Raheja and has a teenage daughter Tara. Due to an accident Rishabh becomes abusive and alcoholic. In order to protect her daughter Uttara sends Tara to hostel who remains unaware of the truth. Still in danger, Uttara is consoled and saved by her elder sister Devyani. She ends up killing Rishabh after suffering severe abuse. She is freed of all charges by Devyani's corrupt and immoral husband SSP Brahmanand Jakhar, who also takes bribes. Uttara is welcomed in Jakhar house against Tara's wish but she eventually forgives her mother.

Vidya who has recently married Gaurav (Devyani's eldest son) is struggling to save her marriage. Despite Gaurav's respect and concern for her she is unable to understand why he doesn't love her. Initially misunderstanding he loves his friend Aarti, she soon learns that he is gay. Despite being devastated and even attempting suicide (where she is rescued by Priya's brother Gagan) she accepts his truth and understands Devyani's reason for hiding it (after Brahmanand tries to kill Gaurav during an argument). Gagan returns after the incident and falls in love with Vidya. Despite Gaurav's support he faces rejection as she still loves Gaurav and remains loyal to him. Respecting her decision he leaves after apologizing to her.

Brahmanand and Devyani's son Aditya falls in love with a girl priya who happened to be Brahmanand's victim in the past. Brahmanand had tried to molest Priya which caused a major change in her personality. However she regains her confidence with Adtiya's help and despite Brahmanand's best efforts they end up getting married.

Everyone is aware of Brahmanand's immoral and corrupt ways except Aditya and his sister Sweety. Post marriage Priya decides to fight against Brahma's evil actions. She realizes that Devyani is aware of everything but remains quiet fearing her children's safety. She manages to give her courage and with priya's support Devyani opposes Brahmanand. Things go haywire when Uttara and Brahma start fall in love and begin an affair.

Devyani finally learns about Uttara and Brahma's affair. Brahmanand accepts Uttara as his wife although they don't marry legally or religiously (official ceremony). Uttara disbelieves her sister when she warns her of Brahma's corrupt practices and womanizing tendencies. Brahma threatens to divorce Devyani and marry Uttara, to control her, but Devyani makes Brahma enraged as she decides to go ahead with the divorce. With the help of Priya's lawyer friend Subhankar and the minister Roshni Devi (Gaurav's partner Karan's mother) she reveals all of his crimes in court due to which the CM gives a suspension threat. This leads to a rift in Aditya and Priya's relationship who disbelieves the accusations towards Brahmanand.

Later, Uttara, who regrets her affair decides to leave him when it is revealed that Brahma's crimes will be taken to a criminal court of law. Blaming Priya for all this, Brahma kidnaps and tries to rape her but gets arrested. Shocked and devastated Aditya finally realizes Brahma's evil truth and severs ties with him. The family and Tara forgive Uttara and learn that Uttara is pregnant with Brahma's child, though Tara is still unaware of the pregnancy. Priya and Aditya mend their relationship. Brahmand meets with and accident and is believed to be dead. He returns on Holi festival seemingly broken and mentally disabled but it is soon revealed that it was his plan all along to become DIG once again. He attempts to blackmail Roshni devi for this but fails due to Priya and Devyani. He kidnaps Vidya after Aditya prevents him from molesting her but Uttara and Devyani save her. Brahmanand tries to escape by kidnapping Priya but she manages to escape with Aditya. Enraged and realizing that he has lost he attempts to take revenge by killing them but instead accidentally drives off a cliff and dies.

Aditya is a hugely successful party leader of his political party. Pregnant, Priya is a successful lawyer. Uttara is working as a designer and has delivered Shravan, her and Brahma's son who becomes heir to Brahma's fortune. Gaurav is happily living abroad with Karan and Vidya has opened an NGO finding peace with Gaurav's memories. Subhankar accepts Devyani's request to remain friends despite his feelings for her. The show ends on a happy note with all four women of the Jakhar household finding peace.

== Cast ==
=== Main ===
- Raqesh Bapat as Aditya Brahmanand Jakhar: Brahmanand and Devyani's son; Uttara's nephew; Gaurav and Sweety's brother; Tara's cousin; Shravan's half-brother; Priya's husband (2010–2012)
- Riddhi Dogra as Priya Aditya Jakhar (née Pradhan): Prabhat's daughter; Gagan's sister; Aditya's wife (2010–2012)

=== Recurring ===
- Indrani Haldar as Devyani Brahmanand Jakhar (née Bindra): Uttara's sister; Brahmanand's widow; Aditya, Gaurav and Sweety's mother; Tara and Shravan's aunt (2010–2012)
- Kamya Panjabi as Uttara Rishabh Raheja (née Bindra): Devyani's sister; Rishabh's murderer and widow; Brahmanand's sister in law, ex-lover and ex-mistress; Tara and Shravan's mother; Aditya, Gaurav and Sweety's aunt (2010–2012)
- Vishwajeet Pradhan as Brahmanand "Brahma" Jakhar: Devyani husband, Uttara's brother in law and ex-lover; Gaurav, Aditya Sweety and Shravan's father; Tara's uncle (2010–2012)
- Vindhya Tiwari as Vidya Gaurav Jakhar: Gaurav's ex-wife (2010–2012)
- Dakssh Ajit Singh as Gaurav Brahmanand Jakhar: Brahmanand and Devyani's son; Uttara's nephew; Aditya and Sweety's brother; Tara's cousin; Shravan's half-brother; Karan's boyfriend; Vidya’s ex-husband (2010–2012)
- Navika Kotia as Tara Rishabh Raheja: Rishabh and Uttara's daughter; Devyani's niece; Aditya, Gaurav Sweety's cousin; Shravan's half-sister (2010–2012)
- Susheel Parashar as Prabhat Pradhan: Priya's and Gagan's father (2010–2012)
- Karan Singh as Karan Roy: Gaurav’s boyfriend; Roshni Devi's son (2010–2012)
- Nivin Ramani as Gagan "Cheenu" Prabhat pradhan: Prabhat's son, Priya's brother; Vidya's friend
- Arun Bali as Baauji: Brahmanad's father; Aditya, Gaurav, Sweety's and Shravan's grandfather
- Shashwita Sharma as Imli: Jakhar household help; Jaggi's wife
- Fenil Umrigar as Sweety Brahmanad Jakhar: Brahmanad and Devyani's daughter; Aditya and Gaurav's sister; Shravan's half sister; Tara's cousin
- Amit Dhawan as Rishabh Raheja: Uttara's late husband; Tara's father (2010)
- Diwakar Pundir as Shubhankar: A lawyer; Priya's mentor and friend; Devyani's friend and one-sided lover
- Nishant Tanwaras Vidya's Brother
- Mona Ambegaonkaras Roshni Devi; former minister; Karan's Mother

=== Guests ===
- Abhishek Bachchan as ACP Vishnu Kamat: To promote his film Dum Maaro Dum (2011)
- Rana Daggubati as Joki Fernandez: To promote his film Dum Maaro Dum (2011)

== Reception ==
=== Critical response ===
The series is remembered as the first show on Indian television to have a gay storyline shown crucial screenspace.

Kshama Rao of The Indian Express quoted the series as 'Bold and edgy', writing, "What works for the story is each episode is reasonably fast paced and has tension writ all over it. The performances especially by the four women are good. The men put in decent performances. It shows you a different side to women who are probably in every other family carrying their own crosses!"

=== Ratings ===
The series which was aired initially at a late night slot of 11:30 pm and shifted to 11:00 pm (IST) in March 2011, had a good viewership in its slot. In its first month of telecast, the series garnered 1 TVR. In May 2011 it rose to 1.2 TVR after the introduction of homosexuality track while during July in week 29 of 2011, it spiked to 1.8 TVR and in November 2011 it was garnering 1.6 TVR.
