= Tere Bin (2016 TV series) =

Indian television series

- First look
- Genre: Drama; Romance
- Created by: Naresh Borde
- Written by: Meer Muneer
- Creative director: Atul Ketkar
- Starring: Gaurav Khanna; Shefali Sharma; Khushboo Tawde; Rohit Bhardwaj
- Country of origin: India
- Original language: Hindi
- No. of seasons: 1
- No. of episodes: 95

Production
- Producers: Naresh Baburao Borde; Amol Baburao Borde
- Production locations: Mumbai, India
- Camera setup: Multi-camera
- Running time: approx 22 minutes
- Production company: Siddhivinayak Productions

Original release
- Network: &TV
- Release: 18 July – 25 November 2016

Tere Bin (Without You) is an Indian Hindi-language television drama series, which premiered 18 July 2016 on &TV at 8pm and ended its run on 25 November 2016. The series was produced by Shree Sidhivinayak Chitra. Gaurav Khanna, Shefali Sharma and Khushboo Tawde played lead roles in the series.

== Plot ==
The show is about Dr. Akshay Sinha (Gaurav Khanna) who sacrificed his love to help his friend's fiance, Vijaya (Shefali Sharma) because she was pregnant when his friend died. Akshay and Vijaya have been married for 8 years but their marriage is a formal one where they care for each other and live as a family, but don't have the dynamic of a husband and wife.

Eight years later, his love, Dr. Nandini Bhatt (Khushboo Tawde) returns. He has a hard time explaining to her what happened and why he had to leave her, while Vijaya accepted her marriage with Akshay. She also wants a life as a normal husband and wife, unaware of the fact that Akshay and Nandini are having an affair. Meanwhile, the stress of the situation and keeping it from Vijaya causes him to behave strangely making Vijaya concerned. Akshay first wanted to end his and Vijaya's marriage by that he can be with Nandini. But whenever he tried to reveal his relationship with Nandini he stopped himself from doing that.

Vijaya finally finds the truth of Akshay and Nandini but she challenges Nandini that she will fix their marriage in one month otherwise she will go out from Akshay's life forever. Nandini tries to woo Akshay back into her life and away from Vijaya much to the dismay of her friend Dr. Irfaan Malik (Rohit Bhardwaj) who has been trying to convince her to move on and has a crush on Nandini that he already confessed to her.

Eventually, Akshay started to realise his priorities and his feelings for Vijaya and he confessed his past relationship with Nandini to Vijaya who told him that she knew the matter some days ago. Then couple confess their love and consummate their marriage. While Nandini realised the fact that now Akshay does not love her anymore and that she has to move on in her life. She decides to marry Irfaan who already loves her and cares for her.

The show ends with Akshay, Vijaya, Irfaan and Nandini starting their lives afresh...

== Cast ==
- Gaurav Khanna as Dr. Akshay Sinha
- Shefali Sharma as Vijaya Akshay Sinha
- Khushboo Tawde as Dr. Nandini Bhatt
- Rohit Bharadwaj as Dr. Irfan Malik
- Mahi Milan Kanani as Neeti Sinha
