= Toofan Singh (film) =

2017 Indian film

- Promotional poster
- Directed by: Baghal Singh
- Written by: Dilbag Singh
- Produced by: Dilbag Singh
- Starring: Ranjit Bawa; Shefali Sharma; Yashpal Sharma; Raza Murad; Avtar Gill; Jarnail Singh
- Release date: 4 August 2017
- Running time: 142 minutes
- Country: India
- Language: Punjabi

Toofan Singh is a 2017 Indian Punjabi-language biographical drama film directed by Baghal Singh and starring Ranjit Bawa as the Sikh militant Toofan Singh.

Though the Indian Central Board of Film Certification refused to certify and banned the film in 2016, it was released internationally in 2017.

== Cast ==
- Ranjit Bawa as Toofan Singh
  - Daman Singh as Gurbaz Singh (young Toofan Singh)
- Sunita Dheer as Toofan Singh's mother
- Sukhvir Singh as Toofan Singh's father
- Shefali Sharma as Sukhjeet Kaur
- Narinder Nina as Bhai Avtar Singh Brahma
- Prince Kanwaljit Singh as Chandi Ram
- Ramniq Sandhu as Haryanvi Lady Sarpanch
- Jarnail Singh as Kashmir Singh
- Deepraj Rana as CRPF officer
- Sardar Sohi as Sewa Singh Police officer
- Gurmeet Sajjan as Gurmail Singh Police officer
- Gagneet Singh Makhan as School master
- Yashpal Sharma as Arvind Ram (SSP)
- Avtar Gill as KPS Gill
- Raza Murad as Home Minister
- Mangal Dhillon as Lakha
- Satinder Kaur as Harbans Kaur Bhainji
