= Dhoom Machaao Dhoom =

- Created by: Ravina Raj Kohli
- Starring: Toral Rasputra; Sriti Jha; Maanvi Gagroo; Aanchal Bharti; Niddhi Tikoo
- Opening theme: "Dhoom Machaao Dhoom Machaao" by Shreya Ghoshal
- Country of origin: India
- Original language: Hindi
- No. of episodes: 100 (list of episodes)

Production
- Executive producer: Nachiket Pantvaidya
- Running time: Musical; Teen sitcom
- Production company: Sol

Original release
- Network: Disney Channel
- Release: 8 January 2007 – 10 January 2008

Dhoom Machaao Dhoom (transl. Rock Let's Rock) is an Indian musical sitcom that aired on Disney Channel India from 8 January 2007 to 10 January 2008, totaling 100 episodes. The story revolves around Priyanka Sethi and a band she forms with her three friends called the Pink Band. The show is one of the first Disney Channel India Original Series.

The show is notable for being the debut platform of many actors who later went to have a successful acting careers on television; Sriti Jha, Kinshuk Mahajan, Toral Rasputra, Maanvi Gagroo, Vikrant Massey and Jay Bhanushali.

== Plot ==
Priyanka Sethi returns to Delhi from New York with her mother after her parents divorce and has trouble adjusting to her new school. Priyanka, who sings, composes and plays guitar, often spends time in her school's music room, where she befriends three unlikely people: Malini, who plays keyboards secretly due to her conservative father's opposition to music; Bikki, an extrovert Punjabi girl who plays tambourine; and Kajal, a hot-headed rebellious girl who plays drums. The four of them create a band of their own, called Pink Band and try to break stereotypes regarding music, bands and societal norms, and soon become celebrities popular with other girls.

The queen bee of the school, Koel, is jealous of them and frequently attempts to sabotage the band. Despite all odds, the band sticks together, and the story shows how they achieve international fame with their will and music.

== Cast ==
- Toral Rasputra as Priyanka Sethi
- Sriti Jha as Malini "Malu" Sharma
- Maanvi Gagroo as Ambika "Bikki" Gill
- Aanchal Bharti as Kajal "KJ" Jain
- Niddhi Tikoo as Koel Tolani
- Aanchal Munjal as Sameera
- Kinshuk Mahajan as Adiraj "Addy" Sherawat
- Akshay Sethi as Nihal Singh Rathore
- Vikrant Massey as Aamir Hassan
- Jay Bhanushali as Varun Bhaskar
- Nirav Soni as Sameer "Motu" Motwani
- Danesh Irani as Cyrus "Psycho" Kachwalla
- Swati Bajpai as Madhu, elder sister of Malini
- Nazneen Madan as Shenaz Ma'am
- Sujata Sehgal as Lekha Ma'am
- Neha Saroopa as Tanya
- Pooja Saroopa as Sanya
- Vikrant Siraj as Anmol Jain
- Paritosh Sand as Brijbhushan Sharma
- Meher Acharia as Priyanka's Mom
- Bhakti Rathod as Loveleen
- Bhuvnesh Shetty as yoga teacher Kreepy (credited as Bhuvanesh Shetty)
- Neelima Parandekar as Malini's mother
- Natasha Sinha as Parvati Menon a.k.a. PM, teacher of Heritage High and also mother of Nihaal which was revealed later
- Bikramjeet Kanwarpal as Koel's father

== See also ==
- Disney Channel India Original Series
- List of programmes broadcast by Disney Channel (India)
