= Damini Kanwal Shetty =

Indian television actress, writer and producer

- Born: Mumbai, Maharastra
- Occupations: Producer writer actress
- Years active: 1993–present
- Spouse: Raaj Shetty

Damini Kanwal Shetty (also known by her screen name Seema Kanwal) is an Indian film producer, writer and actress. She acted in television serials including Parampara, and Alif Laila and played Yashoda’s role in the popular Indian TV show Shri Krishna in 1993 which was telecast on DD National. Currently she directs 'Eternal Flame Productions'.

== Career ==
Shetty started her career in theater; she joined a theater named 'Drikshravan' during her schooling.

== Filmography ==
=== As actress ===
Year	Title	Role	Language	Note
1993–96	Shri Krishna	Yashoda	Hindi	TV serial
1993–94	Parampara		Hindi	TV serial
1993–97	Alif Laila	Queen Sharzad	Hindi	TV serial
1998-99	Zee Horror Show: Anhonee	Various	Hindi	TV serial
2006	Woh Hue Na Hamare	Damyanti Damania	Hindi	TV serial
2015	Crime Patrol	Cop	Hindi	TV serial
2019	Down's Revenge	Sara's mother	English	Film
2020	Phone-a-Friend		Hindi	TV serial

== Producer ==
Year	Title	Language	Note
2013	Maharani	Kannada	TV Serial
2013	Apla Bua Asa Aahe	Marathi	TV Serial
2013–14	Bani: Ishq Da Kalma	Hindi	TV Serial
2013	Charanadasi	Kannada	TV Serial
2013	Aapla Buva Asa Aahe	Marathi	TV Serial
2015	Kinneri	Kannada	TV Serial
2016	Mann Me Vishwas Hai	Hindi	TV Serial
2017	Tulasidala	Kannada	TV Serial
2020	Rakshabandhana	Kannada	TV Serial
2020	Vilayti Bhabhi	Punjabi	TV Serial
2020	Khasma Nu Khani	Punjabi	TV Serial
2021	Choices	Hindi	Film
2021	Crime Patrol	Hindi	TV series

== Director ==
Year	Title	Role	Language	Note
2021	Choices	Director	Hindi	Film

== Writer ==
Year	Title	Language	Note
2005–06	Kaisa Yeh Pyaar Hai	Hindi	TV Serial
2007–08	Parrivaar – Kartavya Ki Pariksha	Hindi	TV Serial
2008–09	Grihasti	Hindi	TV Serial
2008–12	Chotti Bahu	Hindi	TV Serial
2010–11	Rang Badalti Odhani	Hindi	TV Serial
2010–12	Maryada: Lekin Kab Tak?	Hindi	TV Serial
2011	Haar Jeet	Hindi	TV Serial
2012–13	Kya Huaa Tera Vaada	Hindi	TV Serial
2013–14	Ek Mutthi Aasmaan	Hindi	TV Serial
2013–14	Bani: Ishq Da Kalma	Hindi	TV Serial
2014–15	Laut Aao Trisha	Hindi	TV Serial
2014–15	Shastri Sisters	Hindi	TV Serial
2016–18	Zindagi Ki Mehak	Hindi	TV Serial
2020	Vilayti Bhabhi	Punjabi	TV Serial
2021	Lakshmi Ghar Aayi	Hindi	TV Serial
2021	Choices	Hindi	Film
