= Sanjog (TV series) =

Indian television series

- Genre: Drama
- Created by: Rashmi Sharma
- Starring: Rajneesh Duggal; Shefali Sharma; Kamya Punjabi
- Country of origin: India
- Original language: Hindi
- No. of seasons: 1
- No. of episodes: 72

Production
- Producer: Rashmi Sharma
- Production location: Mumbai
- Camera setup: Multi-camera
- Running time: 22 min approx.
- Production company: Rashmi Sharma Telefilms

Original release
- Network: Zee TV
- Release: 22 August – 25 November 2022

Sanjog (transl. Coincidence) is an Indian Hindi language drama television series that premiered on 22 August 2022 on Zee TV and digitally streamed on ZEE5. Produced by Rashmi Sharma under the banner of Rashmi Sharma Telefilms, the series stars Shefali Sharma, Rajneesh Duggal and Kamya Punjabi. It replaced Kashibai Bajirao Ballal in its timeslot. It went off-air on 25 November 2022 and was replaced by Rabb Se Hai Dua in its timeslot.

== Plot ==
Amrita is married to Rajiv and belongs to the rich Kothari family. She is desperate to be a mother, while her husband is having an affair with her best friend Rakshita. Gauri is married to Gopal. They earn their living by petty theft. Gauri wishes to live a luxurious life.

Both their life collides and they end up in the same hospital for the delivery of their child. Accidentally, their daughters are swapped at the time of birth. Amrita gives birth to Chanda and Gauri gives birth to Tara.

=== 7 years later ===
Amrita's daughter Chanda grows up with Gauri while Gauri's daughter Tara grows up with Amrita. They are still confused about their daughters and their contrasting personalities. Eventually, everyone discovers that Chanda is Rajiv and Amrita's biological daughter while Tara is Gauri and Gopal's biological daughter. The show ends with Gauri and Rakshita killing Amrita and Rajiv deciding to raise Tara and Chanda as his own.

== Cast ==
=== Main ===
- Shefali Sharma as Amrita Kothari – Alok's sister, Rajeev's wife, Rakshita's best friend, Chanda's biological and Tara's foster mother (2022) (Dead)
- Rajneesh Duggal as Rajeev Kothari – Rajeshwari's son, Amrita's husband, Rakshita's boyfriend, Chanda's biological and Tara's foster father (2022)
- Kamya Panjabi as Gauri – Gopal's wife, Tara's biological and Chanda's foster mother. Amrita's killer. (2022)
- Rajat Dahiya as Gopal – Gauri's husband, Sarita's son, Tara's biological and Chanda's foster father (2022)
- Sonyaa Ayodhya as Rakshita – Rajeev's girlfriend, Amrita's best friend and killer. (2022)
- Ishaan Singh Manhas as Inspector Alok Agarwal – Amrita's brother, Chanda's uncle (2022)

=== Recurring ===
- Hetvi Sharma as Chandini "Chanda" Kothari - Amrita and Rajeev's biological daughter, Gouri and Gopal's foster daughter (2022)
- Hazel Shah as Tara Kothari – Gouri and Gopal's biological daughter, Amrita and Rajeev's foster daughter (2022)
- Dolly Minhas as Rajeshwari Kothari – Rajeev and Anjali's mother, Amrita's mother-in-law, Chanda's biological and Tara's foster grandmother (2022)
- Sunny Ghansani as Sanjay Oswal – Anjali's husband, Rajeev's brother-in-law (2022)
- Amita Yadav as Anjali Oswal – Rajeshwari's daughter, Rajeev's sister, Sanjay's wife (2022)
- Vaishali Thakkar as Sarita – Gopal's mother, Gouri's mother-in-law, Tara's biological and Chanda's foster grandmother (2022)

== Production ==
=== Development ===
The series was announced by 'Rashmi Sharma Telefilms' in July 2022 by Zee TV. The series follows the story of two distinct mothers.

=== Casting ===
In July 2022, Rajneesh Duggal was cast for lead role in the series, making his fiction show debut.

Shefali Sharma was cast as the female lead, marking her television comeback after 6 years. Kamya Panjabi was signed as the other female lead.

=== Filming ===
The series is mainly shot at the Film City, Mumbai. The shooting of the series began in July 2022.

=== Cancellation ===
The series went off-air on 25 November 2022, due to low viewership.

== See also ==
- List of programmes broadcast by Zee TV
