= Bani – Ishq Da Kalma =

Television series

- Genre: Romantic drama
- Developed by: Damini Kanwal Shetty; Kalpana Chandra Khurana
- Written by: Girish Dhamija; Dheeraj Sarna
- Directed by: Nandita Mehra; Yash Chauhan; Rajesh Patel
- Creative directors: Damini Kanwal Shetty; Raaj Shetty Manjari mukul
- Voices of: Harshdeep Kaur; Shahid Mallya; Udbhav Ojha
- Theme music composer: Udbhav Ojha; Gagan Riar; Sarabh Nayar
- Opening theme: "Bani - Ishq Da Kalma"
- Country of origin: India
- Original language: Hindi
- No. of seasons: 1
- No. of episodes: 317

Production
- Executive producers: Saveen Shetty; Mohit Rajya Guru; Nishikant Negi
- Producers: Raaj Shetty; Damini Kanwal Shetty
- Production location: Delhi
- Editor: Sujit Das
- Running time: Approx. 24 minutes
- Production companies: Colosceum Media Private Limited; Mystic: An Entertainment Company

Original release
- Network: Colors TV
- Release: 18 March 2013 – 20 June 2014

Bani – Ishq Da Kalma (transl. Bani – A Holy Script of Love) is an Indian television drama series, which premiered on 18 March 2013 on Colors TV. The series was originally titled Gurbani, which means the composition of the Sikh gurus. The title of the series was changed after the storyline was changed into a romantic drama.

== Plot ==
The story is set in rural Punjab, and is primarily centered around the desertion of brides by NRI grooms that is prevalent in various regions of Punjab.

Desho declares her intention of getting an NRI bridegroom for her daughter Bani. Soham, who lives in Bani's village, is smitten with her, but he is rejected by Desho since he is not an NRI. Amreek and Parmeet are NRI bachelors. Rajji's marriage is arranged with Amreek and Bani's with Parmeet. On the day of the double wedding, there is a great deal of confusion. First, it seems that Parmeet, who works in Canada, will not turn up for the wedding. So Desho begs Soham to marry Bani and he joyfully agrees. But Parmeet does turn up at the last moment. Then, Amreek leaves in a huff because of a misunderstanding between him and Rajji. Now, because of a communication gap, the brides' relatives get the impression that Soham has agreed to marry Rajji. Thus, Bani marries Parmeet, as planned, while Soham unknowingly marries Rajji instead of his true love.

Bani accompanies Parmeet to her in-laws' home. Parmeet leaves alone for Canada the next morning, promising to return soon. In the meantime, Sohum and his family members realize that the bride they have brought home is Rajji and not Bani. They are very upset, but Sohum's brother Angad suggest that they should give Rajji a chance. At first, Parmeet is quite regular in making phone calls to Bani. Then, it is revealed that Parmeet had only married Bani so that he could legally claim some ancestral property and sell it in order to make money. After getting what he wants, he stops calling Bani.

Eventually, Bani realizes that her husband has abandoned her, but she is determined to get her rights as a wife. She decides to search for him and bring him back. Soham offers to accompany her as an escort. But Rajji, who has been trying hard to make her marriage work, begs Bani not to take Sohum along. So, Bani refuses to let Sohum accompany her and sets out alone for Delhi, from where she plans to go to Canada. In Delhi, she falls into the trap of some criminals who want to use her in the flesh trade. But, luckily, she is rescued in time by a social worker, a lady named Anuradha, whose home becomes a refuge for Bani. Anuradha's daughter is about to marry an NRI named Meet. On the wedding day, Bani discovers that Meet is actually her husband Parmeet, who plans to marry Anuradha's daughter for money. Parmeet flees from the wedding when his truth is exposed. Anuradha said that they will arrest Parmeet but Bani disagrees. The reason was that Bani wanted to punish Parmeet. Bani went back to Parmeet but Parmeet throws Bani out of the House. Rajji gets pregnant and Sohum is taking care of Rajji, soon they are in love but can't say that to each other. When Bani's in-laws plans a picnic Parmeet plans to get Bani killed. They are having a picnic while Parmeet takes Bani to a boat, with the number 13 on it. Parmeet starts the motor and leaves Bani all alone in the boat. The boat moves and slowly sinks into the water. Bani is declared dead and the whole family is heartbroken. Rajji is depressed. However, soon after it is revealed that Bani is alive and is getting treatment in a hospital. She vows to make Parmeet pay. She meets Anuradha again who is later revealed to be Parmeet's real mother. However, Bani is unaware of this. Anuradha invites Bani to stay at her home and Bani tells her everything about Parmeet. Anuradha helps Bani in her plan unaware that Parmeet is her son. Rajji finds out Bani is indeed alive but Bani tells her everything about Parmeet was the cause of the boat incident. Rajji helps Bani and Anuradha. They help Bani disguise herself as a party girl, Maya. In a party, Parmeet spots Bani/Maya and is shocked. He thinks it's Bani and grabs her. But Bani/Maya slaps him and pretends to not know him. She calls herself Maya which confuses Parmeet but he is still not convinced. Bani, Rajji and Anuradha further their plan and are successful in making Parmeet believe that it is indeed Maya. As time passes by, Parmeet falls in love with Maya/Bani but this infuriates Bani as she only wants him to get hurt and not fall in love with her. However, Bani's plans are sometimes foiled by some of the family members who don't believe Bani, but Bani saves herself each time. Soon, Bani and Rajji expose Parmeet and he is thrown out of the house. Bani humiliates him and reveals everything about how she is Bani and transformed herself into Maya. As time passes by Bani falls in love with Parmeet as he really loves her and wins her back. He is thwarted each time but is successful with Rajji's help as she learns how sorry Parmeet really is. Parmeet and Anuradha also reunite after many problems. After a few months everyone is happy as Soham and Parmeet are business partners along with Bani and Rajji. The show ends on a happy note.

== Cast ==
- Shefali Sharma as Bani Parmeet Singh Bhullar/Maya Malhotra
- Neha Bagga as Rajji Soham Singh Bhullar
- Adhvik Mahajan as Soham Balbir Singh Bhullar
- Gaurav Chaudhary as Parmeet Singh Bhullar
- Nimai Bali as Balbir Singh Bhullar
- Paras Singh Minhas as Randeep Singh
- Raymon Singh as Remone Balbir Singh Bhullar
- Rita Bhaduri as Biji
- Jeetendra Bharadwaj as Sarabjit Gill
- Ekta Singh as Desho Sarabjit Gill
- Deeksha Sonalkar as Jassi Sarabjit Gill
- Sooraj Thapar as Nirvail Gill
- Khalida Khan as Binder Nirvail Gill
- Rahul Hans as Keerat Nirvail Gill
- Nitika Anand as Manpreet Singh Bhullar
- Raju Shrestha as Kuljeet Singh Bhullar
- Swati Tarar as Surjeet Kuljeet Singh Bhullar
- Shashwita Sharma as Gaganpreet Randeep Singh Bhullar
- Upasana Singh as Dolly Singh Mann
- Rahila Rehman as Jiya
- Pankaj Bhatia as Angad Singh Mann
- Namrata Ramsay as Simran Angad Singh Mann
- Ekroop Bedi as Kookie Singh Mann
- Rishi Dev as Guggi
- Damini Kanwal Shetty as Anuradha
- Rishi Khurana as Bhansi
- Susheel Parashar
- Ankit Modgil as Amreek Singh
- Navni Parihar as Rano Balbir Singh Bhullar
- Puneet Issar as Gurudev Singh Bhullar
- Abhishek Singh Pathania as Vicky
- Aarti Kandpal as Mami
- Massheuddin Qureshi as 2nd Hero's father
- Allu Sirish as Goutham
- Disha Pandey as Priya
- Hari
- Jonita Gandhi
