= Tum Aise Hi Rehna =

Indian drama television series

- Genre: Drama
- Screenplay by: Rahil Qazzi
- Story by: Mahesh Pandey; Dialogues; Vickky Chandra
- Directed by: Dilip Kumar; Pawan Kumar
- Starring: See below
- Composer: Lalit Sen
- Country of origin: India
- Original language: Hindi
- No. of seasons: 01
- No. of episodes: 96

Production
- Producers: Rashmi Sharma; Pawan Kumar Marut
- Production location: Jaipur
- Camera setup: Multi-camera
- Running time: Approx. 20 minutes
- Production company: Rashmi Sharma Telefilms Limited

Original release
- Network: Sony Entertainment Television
- Release: 10 November 2014 – 9 April 2015

Tum Aise Hi Rehna is an Indian television drama series that premiered on 10 November 2014 and ended on 10 April 2015. It aired Monday through Friday on Sony TV. The stars Kinshuk Mahajan and Shefali Sharma in a lead roles. The show also stars Rishika Mihani, Siddharth Vasudev, Madhura Naik, Indira Krishnan in pivotal roles.

== Story ==
Riya is training to be a doctor and is interning at a hospital in Jaipur. She has been raised in a modern set-up with an open minded loving family who have encouraged her to follow her career. Riya is in love with Abhimanyu who comes from the traditional Maheshwari family where love marriage is frowned upon and women are not allowed to work after marriage. Abhimanyu's tireless efforts enable him and Riya to be married although after a number of hiccups.

Abhimanyu's mother, Rukmini, is a controlling traditional woman who agrees to the marriage to keep her son in the family but openly refuses to accept the modern Riya as her daughter-in-law. Riya's start in her marital home is difficult but she resolves to win over her mother-in-law whilst maintaining her principles.

The story changed shortly after with the introduction of Aanchal, Abhimanyu's obsessive fan who died but has now returned as an evil spirit to be with him. The story then focuses on how Aanchal puts Abhimanyu's family in danger in trying to be with him by embodying and controlling Riya's physical form for her own motives.

== Cast ==
- Kinshuk Mahajan as Abhimanyu "Abhi" Maheshwari
- Shefali Sharma as Dr. Riya Agarwal / Dr. Riya Abhimanyu Maheshwari
- Madhura Naik as Aanchal
- Vidhi Pandya as Kiran Maheshwari
- Indira Krishnan as Rukmini Kailash Maheshwari, Abhimanyu's mother
- Sanjay Gandhi as Kailash Maheshwari, Abhimanyu's father
- Meenakshi Verma as Dadi, Abhimanyu's grandmother
- Raj Singh Suryavanshi as Jatin Maheshwari
- Ankur Ghai as Sarthak Maheshwari
- Namrata Thapa as Sheetal Sarthak Maheshwari
- Gaurav Bajpai as Abhi's Cousin
- Siddharth Vasudev as Rajeev Kapoor
- Rishika Mihani as Anushka Rajeev Kapoor
- Mohit Chauhan as Vishesh Agarwal, Riya's father
- Sonica Handa as Lata Verma / Lata Vishesh Agarwal, Riya's mother
- Madan Tyagi
