= Shefali Sharma =

Indian television actress (born 1991)

- Born: 28 December 1991 (age 34); Amritsar, Punjab
- Occupation: Actress
- Years active: 2013–2019; 2022
- Known for: Bani – Ishq Da Kalma; Tum Aise Hi Rehna; Tere Bin; Sanjog
- Spouse: Varun Sethi (m. 2014)

Shefali Sharma is an Indian actress who mainly works in Hindi television and Punjabi films. She made her acting debut in 2013 and is best known for her portrayal of Bani Bhullar in Bani – Ishq Da Kalma, Dr. Riya Agarwal Maheshwari in Tum Aise Hi Rehna and Amrita Agarwal Kothari in Sanjog.

Sharma made her film debut with the Punjabi film Toofan Singh (2017).

== Personal life ==
Sharma was born on 28 December 1991 in Amritsar, in a Punjabi family. Sharma married her boyfriend Varun Sethi in 2014.

== Career ==
Sharma made her acting debut in 2013 with Bani – Ishq Da Kalma portraying Bani Parmeet Singh Bhullar/Maya Malhotra opposite Gaurav Chaudhary.

From 2014 to 2015, she portrayed Dr. Riya Agarwal / Dr. Riya Abhimanyu Maheshwari in Tum Aise Hi Rehna opposite Kinshuk Mahajan.

She played Laalima Agarwal in Diya Aur Baati Hum from 2015 to 2016. In 2016, she portrayed Vijaya Akshay Sinha opposite Gaurav Khanna in Tere Bin.

Sharma made her Punjabi film debut with Toofan Singh in 2017. She then made her Telugu film debut in 2018 with Babala Bagotham.

In 2019, she appeared in the Telugu film Subhodayam and the Punjabi film Tu Mera Ki Lagda.

Sharma made her TV comeback after 6 years with Sanjog in 2022. She portrayed Amrita Rajeev Kothari opposite Rajneesh Duggal.

== Filmography ==
=== Films ===
| Year | Title | Role | Language | Notes | Ref. |
|---|---|---|---|---|---|
| 2017 | Toofan Singh | Sukhjeet Kaur | Punjabi | | |
| 2018 | Babala Bagotham | Unknown | Telugu | | |
| 2019 | Subhodayam | Unknown | Telugu | | |
| 2019 | Tu Mera Ki Lagda | Sarbi | Punjabi | | |

=== Television ===
| Year | Title | Role | Notes | Ref. |
|---|---|---|---|---|
| 2013–2014 | Bani – Ishq Da Kalma | Bani Parmeet Singh Bhullar / Maya Malhotra | | |
| 2014–2015 | Tum Aise Hi Rehna | Dr. Riya Agarwal Maheshwari | | |
| 2015–2016 | Diya Aur Baati Hum | Lalima Agarwal | | |
| 2016 | Tere Bin | Vijaya Akshay Sinha | | |
| 2022 | Sanjog | Amrita "Amu" Agarwal Kothari | | |

== Awards and nominations ==
| Year | Award | Category | Work | Result | Ref(s) |
|---|---|---|---|---|---|
| 2022 | Zee rishtey awards | Best Maa( mother) | Sanjog | Won | |
| 2013 | Colors Golden Petal Awards | Best Debut (Female) | Bani - Ishq Da Kalma | Won | |
