= Gogol (character) =

- First appearance: Indurer Khut khut
- Last appearance: Telephone Aaripatar Bipad
- Created by: Samresh Basu
- Portrayed by: Ahijit Ghosh

In-universe information
- Full name: Uday Kumar Chatterjee
- Nickname: Gogol
- Gender: Male
- Family: Mother, Father
- Religion: Hindu
- Nationality: Indian
- Residence: Kolkata

Gogol is a teenage fictional detective character created by Bengali writer Samaresh Basu especially for children. Few Gogol's stories were adapted into films.

== Character ==
As per the writer Samaresh Basu, Gogol's father Samiresh Chatterjee, was a fan of Russian writer Nikolai Gogol and hence, named his only child as Gogol Chatterjee. Gogol's real name is Uday Kumar Chatterjee. Basu crafted Gogol as an intelligent boy, obedient to his parents but extremely curious about anything happening around him. He often finds himself entangled in a web of mystery. His curiosity drives him to solve mysteries, some of which are life-threatening. This fictional detective character is still very popular for children. In some cases, a private investigator from Naihati, Mr. Ashok Thakur, helps and saves Gogol from the criminals.

== Stories ==
Bose writes lot of short stories and novels based on Gogol's adventures. Most of the Gogol series were published in Bengali child magazines like Anandamela, Shuktara etc.

- Idurer Khut Khut
- Aayna Niye Khelte Khelte
- Adrishya Manusher Haatchani
- Buno Hati'r Bandhuttwo
- Bhul Barite Dhuke
- Bondho Ghorer Awaj
- Chora Hati Shikari
- Durger Garhkhai Er Durghatono
- Garadheen Jaanalay Rakkhos
- Gogol Kothay?
- Gogoler Keramati
- Gogoler Royraja Uddhar
- Harano Buddhagupti
- Jonaki Bhuter Bari
- Kairong Moth Er Gogoler Kando
- Mahishmardini Uddhar
- Pashchimer Balcony Theke
- Rajdhani Expresser Hatya Rahasya
- Ratna Rahasya O Gogol
- Sonali Parer Rahashya
- Sei Garir Khonje
- Shimulgarer Khune Bhut
- Telephone Aaripatar Bipad

== Films ==
- In 2013, a Bengali movie, Goyenda Gogol, was made based on the story Sonali Parer Rahashya. This movie was directed by Arindam Dey.
- In 2014, another film, Gogoler Kirti was released. It was directed by Pompy Ghosh Mukherjee based on the story Gogoler Royraja Uddhar and Mahishmardini Uddhar. In both the movies, the character of Gogol was played by child actor Ahijit Ghosh.
