= A Winter Tale at Shimla =

2023 film directed by Yogesh Verma

- Official release poster
- Directed by: Yogesh Verma
- Written by: Yogesh Verma
- Produced by: Yogesh Verma
- Starring: Gauri Pradhan Tejwani; Indraneil Sengupta
- Cinematography: Sumit Suryawanshi
- Edited by: Alok Dhara
- Music by: Avyc Dutta
- Production company: Agastaya Cine Dreams LLP
- Distributed by: JioCinema
- Release date: 12 May 2023
- Running time: 140 minutes
- Country: India
- Language: Hindi

A Winter Tale at Shimla is a 2023 Indian Hindi-language romance drama film written, directed and produced by Yogesh Verma under the banner of Agastaya Cine Dreams LLP, it features Gauri Pradhan Tejwani and Indraneil Sengupta. The film was released theatrically on 12 May 2023.

== Cast ==
- Gauri Pradhan as Vaidehi
- Indraneil Sengupta as Chintan
- Deepraj Rana as Uday raj singh
- Rituraj Singh as Naveen
- Niharika Chouksey as Diya
- Nikhita Chopra as Young Vaidehi
- Angad Ohri as Young Chintan
- Eshita Shah as Mona
- Karmveer Choudhary as Deputy CM
- Manu Malik as K.K. Dhariwal
- Ram Awana as Surinder
- Sk Tyagi as Retired IG
- Dhruv Chugh as Rahul
- Shashank Sharma as Executive (Emcee)
- Deepak Adhar as Prahlad Singh

== Reception ==
Aswin Devan of Cinema Express rated the film 2/5 stars. Abhishek Srivastava of The Times of India rated the film 2.5/5 stars.
