= Susheel Parashar =

Indian actor

- Born: India
- Occupation: Actor
- Years active: 1995―present
- Spouse: Preeti Sharma

Susheel Parashar is a veteran Indian actor, known for his work in the Hindi television industry and in Bollywood. His films include Jaal: The Trap; Dushmani; Neal N Nikki; and Hulla. He works mostly in mainstream television serials like Bani – Ishq Da Kalma and is appearing in Balaji Telefilms's supernatural horror fiction TV show Kavach... MahaShivratri

== Television ==
- Jaane Anjaane
- Maryada: Lekin Kab Tak? as Prabhat Pradhan
- 7RCR as Ambalal Khosti, RSS Pracharak
- Bani – Ishq Da Kalma
- Devon Ke Dev...Mahadev as Sage Pitamber
- Aek Chabhi Hai Padoss Mein
- Satrangi Sasural
- Khushiyan
- Shanti
- Hum Sab Ek Hain in Episode 17 as Baba Hariyali (1998)
- Hero - Bhakti Hi Shakti Hai (2007) as Dr. Darr aka masoom sir
- Kavach... MahaShivratri (2019) as Veerendar Patwardhan
- Gud Se Meetha Ishq as Mr. Khurana (2022)
- Pishachini as Ayodhya Singh Rajput (2022)
- Itti Si Khushi as Yashwant Suri (2026)
- Tu Hi Re Dil Mein (2026–present)

== Filmography ==
- Raghuveer (1995)
- Dushmani: A Violent Love Story (1996)
- Jaal: The Trap (2003)
- Joggers' Park (2003)
- Neal N Nikki (2005) - Gyaniji
- Chain Kulii Ki Main Kulii (2007) - Bholu Dada
- Hulla (2008)
- Swaha (2010)
- Jamun (2021)
- Romeo S3 (2025)
