= List of Dhoom Machaao Dhoom episodes =

The following is an episode list for the Disney Channel India show, Dhoom Machaao Dhoom, which won many hearts and created records.

== Episode list ==
=== Production ===
The First Session of Dhoom Machaao Dhoom was shot at a stretch from May–December 2006. It premiered on 8 January 2007.

=== Season 1: January–February 2007 ===
| No. | Title | Original release date | Prod. code |
|---|---|---|---|
| 1 | "Hello Priyanka" | 8 January 2007 | 101 |
Priyanka Sethi the foreign returned girl from New York makes her acquaintance at the Singing Competition held at Cafe Braganza's. She bumps into Koel, the rich snob, and makes her drop her drink on her top. She is wearing a pink dress and is hence given the name 'Gulaabo' by Adhiraj. She impresses the cast of the show—Ambika, Kajal, Malini, Psyco, Motu, Addy, Aamir, Sanya, Tanya except Koel. Unfortunately, her first day at Heritage High School is not too good—she bangs into Koel one more time and gets warned. She bumps into her English teacher and drops water on the test papers. There is an assembly held and Priyanka gave the idea of formation of Bands to represent Heritage High. Note: This is the first episode of Dhoom Machaao Dhoom. Season 1 premieres. This was a special hour-long introductory episode. However, it could have been divided into two episodes.
| 2 | "My friends" | 9 January 2007 | 102 |
Priyanka makes friends with students of Heritage High: Malini-who helps her go to Cafe Braganzas and put up posters, Bikki-who helps her by distributing notices for the band auditions and Kajal-who saves her twice from Koel teasing her. Priyanka and Bikki start the auditions for band members but none of the participants are impressive. Koel gives a rocking performance, unlike any other students—who play and sing horribly. But to everyone's shock, Kajal plays the drums too well. Meet Priyanka's drummer.
| 3 | "Addy, Alisha & Auditions" | 10 January 2007 | 103 |
Priyanka still only has a drummer. She needs a band. In order to try to be close to Priyanka, Addy dresses as a girl and names himself Alisha. He gives an audition, a great one but is caught by Kajal who calls Priyanka, Bikki and Malini. Priyanka is heartbroken and depressed. Her friend make her happy and KJ plays the drums, Bikki plays the tambourine and Malini plays the harmonica. Priyanka is thrilled. Koel, who is spying on the girls, promises herself that she would not let this band be made.
| 4 | "Fire n Ice" | 11 January 2007 | 104 |
Priyanka's band is really happening until Shenaz Maam threatens to cancel it because they did not ask for her permission. She gives them their consent forms to get signed by the next day. Bikki and her whole family get it signed. Priyanka's mother signs hers, Kajal signs it herself and Malini cannot get it signed by her father because she is afraid of his strictness. Priyanka and her band try to decide on a name for their band, but unsuccessfully. Hence, she goes to the library and searches for a book with names of bands, but Varun snatches it from her. Overwhelmed Bikki signs in Lecture's book and is given the punishment of cleaning the library. Meanwhile, Koel forms a band called Fire and Ice, comprising Varun, herself, Sanya and Tanya.
| 5 | "Will She Sign It?" | 15 January 2007 | 105 |
Fire n Ice give a good performance. Priyanka and Malini and KJ and Bikki are walking home and Priyanka says that they should go and speak to her father. Finally they go and Malini's mother gives them Pakodas to eat. They were talking of the band when Malini's father enters and asks what about the band. Priyanka is ready to tell him all about it but Bikki and KJ chicken out and lie to her father. Priyanka and KJ and Bikki are waiting for Malini. Shehnaz ma'ams deadline of 9 am has almost arrived. She finally arrives at the gate and holds the form up.
| 6 | "Kj Problems" | 16 January 2007 | 106 |
Malini holds up the form and it is signed the four friends are thrilled. But, when they go to submit it to Shenaz Maam, she says no because they are late. But after seeing Mr. Sidhwani, she accepts the forms and their band is made, but they have nowhere to practice. They show off to Koel and say that they have got their band ready. Bikki starts the Makkhi Jayegi trick. Addy gives them the music room to practice but Kajal had to announce to the whole school that she was very sorry to Addy and that he is very good and she is very bad. Later, while they are practicing, Priyanka says they should sing a song that she has composed but Kajal and Bikki say that they want to sing Bollywood and Indipop only. Priyanka says original composition will help them win better so KJ says that she can make her chances better and that she quits. She walks off.
| 7 | "Use Loveleen" | 17 January 2007 | 107 |
In her anger, KJ walks away from the Pink Band. Bikki gets caught talking in the English period and is given a punishment of writing "I Will Not Talk in Class" 200 times. Then Priyanka, Malini and forced KJ say they deserve a punishment too, since Ambika was talking to them. They finish and Kj walks past and tells Priyanka she is not interested in the band. Koel takes off Priyanka's poster and puts a Fire n Ice poster up and Amir says no. She tries to bribe him with money and insults him, but all he says is, Tum kitni Battammeese ho Koel, tum khud Nahi jaanti. Finally, KJ orders a chicken sandwich and tells Amir that she left the band. Amir tells her it is her fault and she should not take any decision in anger and should think with her heart. She goes to the girls while they are practising and sits at the drums. There is a vote and Bollywood songs win and KJ says Priyanka can choose the song. Meanwhile. Koel uses Loveleen and says that she can be fav jr. if she spies on the Pink Band and tells her everything about them. Loveleen, says yes and is already on Mission 1. She follows the Pink Band to practice.
| 8 | "Trapped Pink Band" | 18 January 2007 | 108 |
The girls are having trouble in choosing the name for their band. Karma Kola, Awesome Foursome, The Band, Chaar Basanti is all they've got. They want something hep, that shows their attitude too. Amir gives Malini a chit with The Pink Band written on it. Malini suggests the name and everyone loves it. A Song About Pink is sung. They go for practice everyday after school. Loveleen is again dumped by Koel. Koel, using Loveleen's spying, tries to get the Pink Band caught by the Principal. The Pink Band goes for practice and Addy goes to watch them. Suddenly, the door is being knocked at, but brave Priyanka opens the door. It is Motu and Psycho. They warn them that Koel is outside. Again, someone knocks on the door. KJ Malini Bikki and Priyanka hide behind the curtains. It was Mr, Sidwani. Koel had told Varun to bring him. But, Addy Motu and Psycho open the door with Brooms in their hands saying they were given a punishment and they started playing the instruments. Mr. Sidwani confiscates the keys and locks up. The girls come out from behind the Curtain and check the door. They are trapped.
| 9 | "Never Forge Again" | 22 January 2007 | 109 |
Sadu, Koel and Varun go back to check behind the curtains. Addy fakes a heart-attack and Cyco tells the girls to go out when everyone's back is turned. When KJ goes home in the evening, she is thrilled to see her father but fights with him over an issue about her step-mother. The next day, her father comes to school and tells Singhji that he wants to talk to Sadu. Finally, KJ sees her father after Addy tells her that he is in the office and Shenaaz Mam approaches. KJ almost has a heart attack if Shenaz Mam would ask him about signing the papers. But she goes away and KJs father comes out and she apologizes to him. So, he doesn't ask Sadu about anything. After School KJ is playing tennis and Addy follows her into the Girls' locker room. He asks her to forge his father's signature but she says no because she is already in a problem for forging her father's signature. Koel overhears it and threatens KJ to give her The Pink Band's song list of the competition or she will get KJ expelled.
| 10 | "Koel at KJ's" | 23 January 2007 | 110 |
Kajal is feeling guilty for forging her father's signature and Koel's finding out of it makes her feel even worse. Meanwhile, Priyanka, Malini, Bikki and KJ go up to Bikki's attic and find some of BG's old clothes that they would mix and match to make their costumes While Sanya, Tabya and Koel are at Cafe' Braganza's, Koel says Fire n Ice will win and Sanya Tanya say that they will have to win, especially because of KJ. Amir overhears them and later asks KJ about Koel and if she is bothering her. Meanwhile, when KJ comes home from school, she finds Koel at her house talking to her father. She is surprised.
| 11 | "Deadline" | 24 January 2007 | 111 |
Koel didn't tell on KJ. But she says if KJ doesn't give the Songlist by 5 pm the next day, she will call Sadu. KJ sneaks into the staffroom and finds a consent form, but she drops her drumstick and is unaware of the fact that it will get her into trouble. She goes to her father's office and tells him to sign the consent form. Addy and Kajal go back to school and try to put the consent form back in the staff room, but Shenaz mam is reading a book and takes forever. It is 5 pm and Koel would not wait a minute. KJ is running with the song list. Koel almost dials Sadu.
| 12 | "Wer'e All in This Together" | 25 January 2007 | 112 |
KJ reaches and gives Koel the songlist. Koel goes to Varun's house and then their whole band comes and they practice. KJ is very troubled and feels guilty for giving the song list to Koel. They go for practice to Priyanka's house. In this episode it is revealed that Priyanka's father is not with her. The Interschool Music Competition starts. Fire n Ice is before the Pink Band and is introduced by Amir and Addy. The Pink Girls (except Kajal) are surprised to hear their songs being sung by Koel and Varun. KJ is about to leave when Priyanka tells her they are a band and a Band's biggest strength is working together and they are all in this together. All their songs have been sung. The four horrified girls are about to go on stage.
| 13 | "Pink Rocks!" | 29 January 2007 | 113 |
The Pink Band is booed for playing the same songs. But the brave Priyanka and her band play her original composition that was earlier rejected. But, It's Pink, Pink, Pink That's Rockin' Now really helped the Pinks because, they won. Koel is upset because she lost but thinks she is not a loser and then faints. At Braganza's, Pinks are celebrating their victory. Varun goes and dances with Priyanka. Malini doesn't' dance with Amir because she is shy. Sadu says that if the Pink Band is disqualified, Fire N Ice will represent Heritage High. Koel plans on telling Sadu and then The Pinks about KJ's forgery.
| 14 | "The Picnic (1)" | 30 January 2007 | 114 |
KJ wants to tell her friends about the forgery the next day at the Senior School picnic. But she accidentally takes her phone off the hook and oversleeps. Priyanka Malini and Bikki are wondering where she is. They are at their picnic spot. Meanwhile, KJ wakes up, realizes she's late and goes all the way on her Cycle. She has a tyre puncture, too. The students and teachers of Heritage High play dumb charades. Sadu checks with KJs father if he signed the forms and he said yes. So, Koel goes to all the Pinks and tells them about Kajal's forgery. They are shocked. Kajal finally arrives to see all her friends upset.
| 15 | "Double Standards" | 31 January 2007 | 115 |
Malini, Bikki and Priyanka are disappointed with KJ and ask her why she had not told them. She says she did it for the band and their friendship. On the bus, KJ doesn't let Malini sit on the seat next to her. Upset KJ confesses to her father while crying. KJ is not going to school and also is not talking to her friends. Priyanka and Addy sneak into KJ's house and Priyanka talks to KJ. KJ tells Priyanka that she knows that the band is as important to her as KJ and that she should go and tell Sadu that she forged her father's signature.
| 16 | "Bye Bye KJ!" | 1 February 2007 | 116 |
Priyanka goes to Sadu to tell him that KJ forged the sign. But Sadu praises her and her band and says he has already sent the form as Pink Band of Heritage High's official entry. Priyanka sends a note to KJ saying that their friendship is greater and that KJ wins. Varun and Amir stand for the election of sports captain and a basketball match is set to decide who will be the captain. Varun wins the match and becomes the sports captain. The Pink Band sing a song and KJ is not there. But, KJ comes saves the Pink Band but makes an announcement and says that she is leaving The Pink Band. She quits. Koel and Varun are happy. Varun accepts KJs leaving as a double victory.
| 17 | "KJ's Back!(1)" | 5 February 2007 | 117 |
Kj goes to the girls' locker room and starts crying because she realizes that she just made Koel win and Pink Band and her friends lose. Priyanka is also very disappointed and has flashbacks about her life in Bombay-from the very first day. KJ goes home and her father yells at her and her mother tells her father to talk to her because she needs friends and she is sad. So he does and tells her to go and apologize to her friends about what she had done. The next day Priyanka was telling Sadu about the Pinkl Band no more when KJ makes an announcement apologizing to the Pink band and that she has not left. Amir and Varun have a serious physical fight and Malini sees this and she is heartbroken.
| 18 | "KJ's Back!(2)" | 6 February 2007 | 118 |
Priyanka is stressed out and Sadu gets angry with the Pink Band. Priyanka bangs into Shenaaz Mam and she becomes angry with Priyanka and her band and wants to resign from Heritage High. KJs apology is accepted and she promises never to leave the Pink Band ever again. They are BFFs now. A teacher's council meeting is held and Shanaaz Mam (in favor of Fire n Ice) has five votes on her side and Lekha Mam (on Pink band's side) also has five votes on her side. Sadu will not vote. The final vote is left in the hands of the Yoga Master, who likes both-Lekha and Shenaaz.
| 19 | "Varun and Priyanka" | 7 February 2007 | 119 |
Pink band doesn't win the voting. Varun acts extra sweet and kind and wins Priyanka over. His plan is to get Priyanka to compose an original song for Fire n Ice so that Heritage High can win the music competition. Bikki and Koel are suspicious of Priyanka and Varun respectively. Varun takes Priyanka in his car, helps her pull a book out of a shelf that she cannot reach and when they are in the yoga class, he calls Priyanka out and tells her that one round in the competition is Original Composition. He asks her to compose a song for Fire n Ice and to think it over and tell him the next day.
| 20 | "Basketball" | 8 February 2007 | 120 |
Varun acts sweet and innocent to make friends with Priyanka so that he can steal her original compositions and she even agrees to give him her compositions. Priyanka does compose a song and has a Priyanka to Priyanka debate. But when Varun and Priyanka play a game of basketball Priyanka accidentally pushes Varun and his hand is fractured due to which Fire-n-Ice gets disqualified and in its place Pink band is selected to perform for the inter-school competition.
| 21 | "Caught Bikki" | 12 February 2007 | 121 |
Varun is badly injured and goes to the nurse. Koel, Sanya and Tanya are at Sadu's office and The Pink Band is called in and told that Varun will not be able to play the guitar so PINK is the official entry. Koel is seeking revenge on a new member now. Loveleen tells Koel that Bikki has nine black marks. They have to submit their assignments and Bikki cannot find hers. Finally, she does and when Lecture opens it, there is a filmy magazine inside. Bikki is in trouble and has to clean all the classrooms for three weeks. Later. Motu tells Bikki that he will clean the classes for her and that she can practice. When Cyco and Motu are cleaning the classes, Lecture catches them and hurries to the Music Room. She finds Bikki and tells her she is now suspended, she has ten black marks.
| 22 | "You're A Great Actor Bikki" | 13 February 2007 | 122 |
Bikki gets Lecture fooled by passing a very firmly and patriotic dialogue. Lekha Mam let her go. Koel was really upset because she had failed to get Bikki out of the Pink Band too. Only Mailini was left to try her luck. The girls got ready for the Music Competition. They were there. Priyanka's dream was now a reality. They went in front of the stage to hear the announcement. The Host announced that there was a surprise performance—FIRE N ICE. Shocked, all the Pinks stared.
| 23 | "Clothe-less Pinks" | 14 February 2007 | 123 |
Fire N Ice gives a rocking performance. Backstage, Priyanka gives Varun her best performance-Dhoom Machaao Dhoom. We meet Niel Roy from ST. Marks, Kolkata. Bikki has a major crush on him. The Pink Band goes in their dressing room, to find their clothes destroyed. The Pink Band has to perform. Motu's father has a girls' clothing store and Addy, Motu, Cyco, and Amir go to buy costumes for the girls in 37 minutes. The Pink Band is called on stage. They give a rocking performance. The finalists are PINKS, NIEL and FIRE N ICE.
| 24 | "Hurry Up Malini, We Need You!" | 15 February 2007 | 124 |
Malini finds it hard to escape her father's eagle eyes in order to reach in time for the performance. But no problem as Addy is here he comes disguised as some girl and says that he is Malini's friend who has come to call Malini and her sister Madhu for the satsang and takes Madhu and Malini with him. Pink band prepares to perform for the inter-school competition.
| 25 | "Pink Band Banned!" | 19 February 2007 | 125 |
Malini makes it just in time for her synthesizer solo and The Pink Band gives a rocking performance. It's Fire N Ice's turn and they sing the song that Priyanka has composed and they win. The Pink Band goes and complains to the panel of judges and Shenaz Mam is called in. She says that it was a FNI Original Composition. She is very upset with The Pink Band and bans them.
| 26 | "Resign, Shehnaz Mam" | 20 February 2007 | 126 |
Bikki, KJ, and Malini are too shattered to go to school. Priyanka tells her mother about FNI stealing the original competition. But Priyanka goes to school and also encourages younger students to be like the Pink Band she tells off anyone who insults the Pink Band. Shenaz mam tells Priyanka and the girls not to teach other students because they are losers and also because she has banned the Pink Band. She calls Sadu and tells him about their disobedience. She says that she will resign if they are not expelled from school.
| 27 | "Aamir and Varun Rusticated?" | 21 February 2007 | 127 |
Shenaz mam doesn't resign and tells Koel and Varun to become friends with the Pink Band. To win, as usual, Koel sucks up to the Pink Band. She offers to buy them refreshments at Barganzas and acts kind. Aamir gives Malini his poetry book that he wrote for her and she forgets it on the counter and Koel takes it. The Pink Band does not fall for Koel's sick trick. Koel gives the diary to Varun who rags Aamir the next day after school. The two Again have a physical fight which Sadu sees and tells them they are rusticated.
| 28 | "The Rustication of Varun (1)" | 22 February 2007 | 128 |
Malini's father calls Heritage High and Addy picks up the phone and says she is in the office reciting a poem. Amir and Varun are inside and it is finally decided that Amir is innocent and Varun is guilty. Sadu tells Varun that he is rusticated and Varun says that his father is greater than Sadu and that he cannot rusticate him. Later, the phone rings, perhaps it is Varun's father.
| 29 | "The Rustication of Varun (2)" | 26 February 2007 | 129 |
The phone that rang was a wrong number. Sadu officially rusticates Varun from Heritage High. Koel is called and The Pink Band is given the trophy. Koel is told to apologize to the Pinks in front of the whole school and Koel faints. Addy fakes a sickness but all his friends realise it. Amir is not rusticated and is let off on a warning. Koel tells her father to rusticate Amir from school. The End of Season 1. Jay Bhanushali leaves the cast.

=== Season 2: February–May 2007 ===
| No. | Title | Original release date | Prod. code |
|---|---|---|---|
| 30 | "Koel's Revenge" | 27 February 2007 | 130 |
Koel sends a chit with the answers of the exam with Sanya and Tanya to givt to Malini to give to Amir. Amir goes on to his Exam and the chit falls out. The lecturer sees it and takes him to Sadu's office. But the lecturer had confiscated Koel's cellphone and heard her talking about some plan and Amir is allowed to go and complete his paper. Mr. Tolani comes to school to talk to Sadu. Then he bumps into Priyanka and her friends. He invites them for dinner and Priyanka says yes. Koel is happy her plan is in action. This is the first episode of Session 1 Season 2 of Dhoom Machaao Dhoom. Although there is no gap between the airing date of episodes 29 and 30, this is Season 2.
| 31 | "Motu's Designs" | 28 February 2007 | 131 |
In yoga class, Motu goes out crying because he is upset that Koel's father is stopping his father's business. Cyco shows Priyanka Motu's Designs that he has created and Priyanka and the Gang agree to model all the clothes at Koel's party. Malini's father almost caught all the girls while they were trying out the clothes. Amir will be the MC and The Pinks, Cyco and Addy will model Motu's clothes. Koel loves the ideas and says that this is the perfect way to complete her revenge.
| 32 | "What A Show Girls!!" | 1 March 2007 | 132 |
Priyanka, Bikki, KJ, and Malini, Amir, Addy, Cyco and MOtu arrive at Koel's farmhouse. Soon, they discover that Motu;s clothes are missing. Priyanka comes up with the idea of wearing Koel's clothes. Motu uses some of Koel's clothes and makes his own designs. The Girls also made some of Koel's clothes in the What Not To Wear part of the show. Koel's father tells Amir that he can eliminate all of his difficulties if Amir gets rid of the Pink Band. And if Amir doesn't, he can make his life worse.
| 33 | "Braganza's in Big Trouble." | 12 March 2007 | 133 |
When Amir goes home to the cafe that night Mr and Mrs Braganza tell him that Rajiv Tolani wants to buy the Cafe. Addy reaches this news to the girls who are staying at KJ's. They sneak out without telling KJ's mother. Koel reaches and Priyanka has a plan to raise money for the Cafe. Brijbhushan goes to KJs house to check on Mailin, but ehy had gone back home by then. KJ's mother tells KJ's father about it and the next morning the girls are questioned by Anmol. A telegram comes to tell Braganza's to pack up by next week.
| 34 | "Beg For Forgiveness" | 13 March 2007 | 134 |
Addy tells Motu and Cyco that the Cafe is being sold. They and the Pink Band get a lecture from Coach Coachwalla to exercise and that jogging is good. Priyanka gets an idea-A SPONSORED MARATHON-to raise 9 lakhs in one week. Kajal's father is not talking to KJ until and unless she apologizes to her mother, Munmun. Amir thinks this Marathon will not work. He says the only way to save Braganza's is to apologize to Rajiv Tolani.
| 35 | "Slave for a Day" | 14 March 2007 | 135 |
Amir goes to Koel's house and apologizes to her father but he tells Amir to go and apologize to Koel. Koel says she will not buy the cafe if he will be her slave for a day. She goes to school and in front of everyone she ill treats Amir. Finally, she calls up Malini's father but Amir refuses to. So the only option left is to advertise the marathon on Kajal's father's radio show. Kajal's father is not talking to her so she has to first call her stepmother and apologize.
| 36 | "Moms, Moms and Radio Shows" | 15 March 2007 | 136 |
All of Kajal's friends are upset with her but they encourage her to apologize to her mother and when she goes home, she tries but something always comes in her way- A phone call, a doorbell, etc. Finally when her father comes home, she apologizes to her father and calls her mother. Hence, the next morning KJ, Bikki and Priyanka go on the show. Malini had sent a chit for Priyanka to read out as her father did not give her the permission to go. So Priyanka announces her name. When she turns off the radio, she sees her father looking angry.
| 37 | "Run To Save Barganza's (1)" | 19 March 2007 | 137 |
Malini escapes as her father fails to hear Priyanka say Malini is a part of the Pink band. The girls go to school and for the next five days Vishal Malhotra successfully persuades many people to Run To Save Barganza's. Priyanka and Amir are in charge of the events. Addy and KJ are together, traffic controllers, Malinia and Cyco, Bikki and Motu are in charge of First Aid and Mr and Mrs Barganza are in charge of refreshments. They are all at the spot and Coach and Mr Kuroop come to take part. Besides them no one else has taken part. It is 5 pm.
| 38 | "Run To Save Barganza's (2)" | 20 March 2007 | 138 |
Finally, all the participants arrive and everyone is on duty. Sadu and Singhji arrive and also BG, Bikki's parents. Addy is chasing girls once the marathon begins and not knowing it's KJ's mother, complements her. Bikki, Priyanka, Kajal and Malini are jogging and Malini's father is in the vehicle next to her but fails to see her. Meanwhile, Koel is jogging with her father and for the first time eats a pani puri, has a beggar touch her and then to top it all off, she runs into the Pink Band who tease her on the way.
| 39 | "Press Release" | 21 March 2007 | 139 |
.Priyanka, KJ, Bikki and Amir tell Malini to tell her father everything. She does say yes, but just to change the topic. Everyone reaches Cafe Braganza's and makes their donations. A sneeky press person with her photographer comes to the Cafe, to write an article on the Marathon, The Pink Band and the horrible Mr Tolani. Many times they try to get a story on the Pink Band and a group picture, but fail. Koel calls up Brijbhushan, Malini's father and tells him about Mailin, but he refuses to believe her. Backstage, the photographer takes a picture of the Pink Band, when they are not paying attention.
| 40 | "Malini's Secret is NO MORE!" | 22 March 2007 | 140 |
Backstage, Mailini decided that she will tell her father everything that very night. So, The Pink Band gets into Motu's Designs and ready for the fashion show. Rajiv Tolani calls Brijbhushan to Cafe Braganza's to meet him. The Pink Band, individually model some fantastic clothes. Finally, they sing the song Dhoom Machaao Dhoom Machaao, which is a hit. Brijbhushan comes to the cafe, where he sees Malini playing the piano. He is furious, Malini is nervous and guilty. The Pink Band is in jeopardy.
| 41 | "Malini's Problem and Priyanka's plan" | 26 March 2007 | 141 |
Malini's father takes her home he is furious. He locks her up in her room. Madhu di is scared of going home because she is scared her father will lock her out of the house. At the cafe, Priyanka, Malini and KJ say it's their fault because they didn't start the show earlier, Amir blames himself for insulting Rajiv Toalni, and Motu and Ccyo blame themselves for telling Brijbhushan that that was Cafe Braganza's. Priyanka thinks of a plan. She tells her mother to speak to Malini's father and tell him that Malini didn't do anything wrong and that he should not punish her. But her mother refuses to do so. Koel's mother asks her if the Pink Band will perform to her all girls night party but Koel throws a tantrum.
| 42 | "Malini banned from going to Heritage High!!" | 27 March 2007 | 142 |
At school, Bikki is obsessed with her last black mark. All of Malini's friends-Cyco, Motu, Priyanka, KJ, Bikki, and Addy write a note for Malini and put it in her newspaper. KJ, Bikki and Priyanka beg her mother speak to Brijbhushan, she refuses but finally falls for it. Addy and Amir go to Malinu's backyard Addy distracts the watchman and Amir goes and asks Malini how she is. Priyanka and her mother go and Priyanka's mother tells Brijbhushan not to stop Malini from playing music. Brijbhushan is angered. He yells at Malini and bans her from going to Heritage High.
| 43 | "Leaving Certificate" | 28 March 2007 | 143 |
Malini is shattered. Priyanka and Koel have an argument at school in which Priyanka talks back to Koel, as rudely as Koel did to her. Lekha mam thinks the student rivalry is too much and has an idea--BONDING EXERCISE. All the teachers except Shenaz Kapoor agree. Mr Kuroop takes the class. Everyone pairs up with their favourite rival-Priyanka and Koel, Bikki and Sanya, Cyco and Tanya, Motu and some other chick, Addy and KJ, etc. They had to forgive each other. Brijbhushan comes to Heritage High and meets Sadu. He asks him for Malini's leaving certificate. Somehow, Sadu praises Malini and gets Brijbhushan thinking.
| 44 | "Scholarships, Promises and Guilty Dads" | 29 March 2007 | 144 |
Flashabcks of Priyanka's mother, the principal of the new school and Sadu get Brijbhushan thinking. He regrets being so mean to Malini. Amir gets a scholarship because he topped his exams. Priyanka and the gang continue their bonding exercise, but now more in detail. Meanwhile, Sarla gives Brijbhushan a piece of her mind. Brijbhushan apologizes to his family. Malini promises her father that she will never play music again.
| 45 | "Malini's Back!" | 1 April 2007 | 145 |
Malini's father is happy and they forgive each other. He thinks of a plan to make Malini happy, so he takes her to heritage high. Anir is so glad to see Malini that he thinks he is dreaming. He starts chit chatting with her immediately and tells her that the Pink Band should come back inhto action. In class, students reveal their bonding exercises bonds and Koel tells the class that she knows something about Priyanka that no one else knows. Bikki, and KJ are shocked, bu their shock is diminished when she tells them Priyanka is allergic to lemons. Addy stops the girls from going into the canteen because he thinks Amir is with another girl. But when Malini's friend find her they are happy. But Malini tells them she promised her father that she would not be a part of the band, Koel is thrilled.
| 46 | "Sadu's 50th!" | 2 April 2007 | 146 |
Malini's friends are shocked to learn that she has decided to leave Pink band and music. They try to convince her to rejoin Pink band but all in vain. Meanwhile, Lekha ma'am tells the girls that Pink band should perform for the principal's fiftieth birthday to make the occasion special. The girls agree in spite of knowing that Malini would not perform.during the birthday celebration Lekha ma'am calls up Pink band on to the stage for the performance but the girls are missing. Aamir and Addy feel that they are hiding and have not come to school to avoid the humiliation.
| 47 | "Will Malini Change Her Mind?" | 3 April 2007 | 147 |
Malini denies to perform for principal's birthday so, Priyanka apologises to the students and teachers and tells them that the band is no more as Malini has left the band because of some personal problems. Instead of the Pink band Koel and her team perform. Lekha ma'am again comes up with an exercise where the students are asked to choose a subject of their choice on which they will do a project. Koel and Priyanka along with Bikki and Taniya choose music. Shenaz ma'am asks them to form a band which will perform the coming Sunday. Malini is called by the principal who requests her to rethink about her decision of leaving the Pink band. Even Aamir tells her that if she leaves the band he will cancel his scholarship.
| 48 | "New Guy, Forgiven Promises and New Bands" | 4 April 2007 | 148 |
A fight happens between Pink band members where Kajal taunts Malini by saying that she has caused many problems for them. Koel gets happy seeing them fight. Malini's father allows Malini to rejoin Pink band and follow her dreams. Priyanka and Koel fight over the song selection and Priyanka's mother as usual comes up with a solution telling them to sing both the songs. Priyanka, Koel, Bikki and Tanya start to perform as a band and everyone is impressed but, then a man suddenly enters, shutting his ears shouting "stop it". NOTE- In this episode Nihal and Priyanka sang the song 'yeh pal' a little bit which was mainly the song in kya mast hai life.
| 49 | "Nihal the New Guy a New Problem for Priyanka" | 8 April 2007 | 149 |
The new student, Nihal Singh Rathod, tells Priyanka that she is playing the wrong sync. She dislikes his preaching and rudeness. Everyone is charmed by his attitude and good looks except Priyanka, Addy and Motu. Even Kajal is impressed by Nihal which makes Addy jealous. Once again Priyanka bumps into Nihal and messes up his form by dropping water on it. This angers Nihal. but later he comes to Priyanka again asking to sing a few notes composed by him in order to check the tune. Again he finds fault in Priyanka by saying she is singing the wrong scale and they fight. Afterwards, he comes and says that he can give music lessons to Priyanka which raises her temper once again and she snaps at him. Meanwhile, Koel smirks thinking that Priyanka is making a big mistake as she doesn't know who Nihal is.
| 50 | "Who really is Nihaal?" | 9 April 2007 | 150 |
Priyanka blasts Nihal off and tells him she hates rude people. Koel takes advantage of the situation by telling Nihal that Priyanka has loads of attitude but Nihal is least bothered. Priyanka's friends call her up to tease about how she gets jealous when Koel is with Nihal. Bikki also says that she heard some girls in school telling that he is an actor's son but, Priyanka refuses to believe it.next day at school Priyanka again bumps into nihal but he refuses to talk to her as Priyanka had made him promise not to talk to her. Koel's father says that Nihal is part of their plan to get rid of Priyanka and the principal of Heritage High will get a phone call soon about it. Koel asks Nihal about the plan but he denies knowing anything.the principal gets a call and starts shivering fainting immediately.he gets hospitalised and lekha ma'am is given the responsibility of taking care of the school in his absence. Koel calls her father telling that his evil plans are working but, when she turns back she finds Priyanka staring at her suspiciously.
| 51 | "Nihal and Addy in Trouble?" | 11 April 2007 | 151 |
Priyanka doesn't hear Koel's conversation on her cell phone but, tells Koel to ask Nihal to stop bothering Priyanka. Koel gives Nihal Priyanka's message and Nihal says now, he will show his real talent to Priyanka. Nihal again starts bothering Priyanka by following her everywhere and asking her weird questions and tells her that she lacks knowledge in music. Priyanka gets angry and asks him to leave her alone. Priyanka tells her friends that she would not lose her temper next time even if Nihal keeps irritating her again and again. Shenaz ma'am stealthily reads a letter from the trusty to the principal and says that now she will have to respect Nihal more. Koel and Nihal are talking to each other when suddenly Nihal remembers a tune and sees Addy who was spying on Nihal. Nihal runs after Addy and gets Addy's book to write the tune.soon, he finds out that it is none other than Priyanka's music book and starts reading it. Addy gets angry seeing Nihal reading the book and snatches the book. but, Addy falls down soaking the book in a puddle of water.
| 52 | "Music Challenge Who Will Win?" | 12 April 2007 | 152 |
Addy is scared that Priyanka will get quite angry at him because he messed up her book. Nihal agrees to help Addy.meanwhile, Koel is glad that Priyanka's music book is ruined. Nihal irons the book and saves it from getting damaged.he takes it to Priyanka, who gets angry and thinks that he stole her music book.she complains about it to Lekha ma'am. but later she finds out that Nihal is innocent and apologises to him. But, Nihal sets a music challenge between him and Priyanka. Priyanka reluctantly agrees. He sets a stage and calls up Priyanka. He also has a condition that the one who sings out of tune will have to go through training under the winner who sings in the correct tune.
| 53 | "Nihal Wins the Music Challenge and Trains Priyanka." | 16 April 2007 | 153 |
Nihaal sings really tough raagas which Priyanka finds hard to sing. So, finally she accepts her defeat and agrees to take training under Nihaal. Koel takes advantage of the situation by telling Nihaal that she will also join Priyanka for training classes. Priyanka is upset and shares her sorrows with her mother. Priyanka's mother advises Priyanka not to be overconfident about her talent and to avoid being egoistic. She says that god is testing Priyanka's talent so Priyanka should work more hard now. Nihaal once again insults Priyanka during training classes. Priyanka's friends are concerned about Priyanka and feels that Priyanka and Nihaal's rivalry should end. So they come up with a plan to make Priyanka and Nihaal friends.
| 54 | "Mission Dosti" | 17 April 2007 | 154 |
Priyanka's friends decide to make Priyanka and Nihaal friends by ending their rivalry. During class hours Kajal makes a lame excuse and makes Priyanka sit with Nihal. Bikki suggests an idea to Lekha ma'am where the students can say dialogues from the play Romeo and Juliet to each other in the form of a skit to make the class a bit more interesting. Lekha ma'am likes the idea. Bikki and gang persuade Nihaal and Priyanka to say the dialogues to each other. Later, Aamir goes up to Nihaal and asks him to be friends with Priyanka to which he agrees. Priyanka is about to shake hands with Nihaal when manager singh comes and asks Nihaal to contact Tolani to help him get the trustee's fax back. Then Priyanka says she can never be friends with someone who is related to Koel and family.
| 55 | "Who is Nihaal's Mom?" | 18 April 2007 | 155 |
Manager requests Nihaal to contact Tolani regarding some office work and Nihaal after a lot of persuasion agrees. Priyanka asks Nihaal if he is connected to koel in any way and if Koel is planning a surprise party for his parents wedding anniversary. Nihaal tells her that his father is no more. Priyanka and her friends decide to find out Nihaal's mother's identity which he wants to hide. Psycho makes Nihaal sign a form where they have asked mother's name. Nihaal is not comfortable revealing his mother's name and leaves the class. He confronts Koel about the anniversary thing. Koel tells that Priyanka lied about it. Nihaal decides to teach Priyanka a lesson. Him along with Koel sings Priyanka's composition without her permission. Priyanka is furious and warns Nihaal not to mess with her again.
| 56 | "Priyanka and Nihaal to Sing Together!" | 19 April 2007 | 156 |
Priyanka is fuming with anger when Bikki comes and bothers her by asking what happened. Priyanka blasts off Bikki by telling that whatever Bikki does is quite stupid. Bikki is quite hurt and cries. When Kajal learns of this she says that Priyanka is crossing her limits and they should wait till Priyanka herself comes and apologises. Priyanka and her mother go to a music release party where they meet Nihaal. Nihaal's friend Gowri Shankar asks Nihaal to sing a song and they are in need of a female singer for the duet. Nihaal suggests Priyanka's name.together they sing a song which enthralls everyone. The next day at school, Priyanka apologises to Bikki for her rude behaviour and the four girls hug. Priyanka is soon called by Lekha Ma'am and she along with Nihaal reaches the principal's cabin.there they meet a music director who wants them to sing a song in his upcoming movie. Nihaal and Priyanka are delighted to hear about it.
| 57 | "The Auditions" | 23 April 2007 | 157 |
Nihaal immediately says yes to the offer without asking Priyanka. Priyanka is annoyed about the same and tells Nihaal that he has no right to take decisions for her. Nihaal says it is because of him she got this offer which makes her more angry. So, she goes up to the music director and tells him that she cannot sing without her band members, so he asks her to audition along with her band. Priyanka and girls start to practice for auditions but they all unknowingly avoids Bikki because she doesn't have much role in the band when compared to others. She is upset about it and asks Nihaal for music lessons.he tells her to be confident and believe in her talent.next day they all attend the audition at school. Nihaal while singing asks the girls to play the musical instruments as he needs orchestration. Just then Koel and her girls come telling that if the music director wants to see true talent then he should give Koel a chance.
| 58 | "Priyanka- the best" | 24 April 2007 | 158 |
Koel and her girls come telling that if the music director wants to see true talent then he should give Koel a chance. Music director gives her a chance to sing after pink performs. When all three have given their performance, Music Director- Rohit Anand points out the three's mistakes/ negative points on which they'll have to work on. He starts with Koel telling her that her voice is stereotype, it has arrogance in it and it is a little difficult task to overcome it. He next turns towards Nihaal and says though he is technically an expert, he must sing music from his heart and soul. Last, he selects Priyanka saying that her voice has bachpana in it, she sings 4m her soul. But he asks her to work on the technicalities in which she is poor. He calls her to his studio next day. But Priyanka believes she must give up this opportunity because he wants a solo- singer only, not her band. The otherside, Koel asks her father to talk with Mr. Rohit Anand to give her a chance instead of Priyanka. Koel is informed by her father that if Priyanka refuses the offer, then Koel might go for the professional audition. So, Koel visits Priyanka (her house) to convince Priyanka deny the offer.
| 59 | "Priyanka- proud of You, beware of the new band 'ROCKSTARS'" | 25 April 2007 | 159 |
The next day after the auditions in school, Priyanka gets a call from Rohit Anand asking whether they must send her a vehicle/ she will come on her own. But Priyanka replies she would not accept this offer without her band and that her band members had also seen this dream of being stars with her. Lekha/ Lecture ma'am is very proud. Koel thanks Priyanka for refusing offer and leaves to give the auditions. Meanwhile in class when Priyanka sympathizes Nihaal and tells him that she has refused the offer, he shouts at her saying she deliberately made mistakes when she sang so that she would get the chance. The boys (Addy, Motu, Cyrus) tell Sanya- Tanya that they are rockstars, talented more than Koel and that Koel is stopping them from being rockstars. Koel comes back to school and tells her experience to the Pink band and thanks Priyanka again for giving her a chance. Later, Koel is informed that Mr. Rohit Anand is not willing to work with her because of her attitude. Followed by this incident, Tanya- Sanya tell her that they are quitting her band and breaking their friendship with her. They make their own band- EW " The Everlasting Winners". Koel calls her father telling that she wants the twin sisters to be chucked out of the school the next day. But Nihaal stops her and asks her to tell her father that she has expelled losers from her band, there is a brand new member in her band. Nihaal and Koel form a band- ROCKSTARS.
| 60 | "Pink Band's Rustication and New Vice Principal!" | 26 April 2007 | 160 |
The Rockstars give a special performance to impress the students. They even say that they will form a song list according to the students of Heritage High's choice. Malini feels Nihaal and Koel are starting politics in school. The Rockstars set to find a drummer for their band and decide that they will select a weak person so that the person would not hog limelight. They also insult Loveleen and makes her do a silly dance. Bikki warns them to stop teasing Loveleen. Priyanka, Bikki and Motu clean the music room as their monthly duties while Addy, KJ, Malini and Phsyco repaint the canteen tables. Addy irritates Kajal and makes her mad so she begins to do her job fast to get rid of them. KJ begins to think that Addy was missing Sanya-Tanya so he was troubling her. But there was a bet between Pysco and Addy to see if Addy could make Kj do her work. Priyanka rechecks to see whether it is properly locked and keeps the key on the table as the manager has left. But, they soon find out that the musical instruments are stolen. The girls go to meet Lekha ma'am but finds a new vice principal who decides to rusticate the Pink band from the school because of Priyanka's carelessness. Note: Co-Starring: Bhakti Rathod as Loveleen.
| 61 | "Prove If You Can" | 30 April 2007 | 161 |
The Pink Band gets a chance to prove themselves. They split themselves up into 4 groups- Addy and Kj, Priyanka and Malini, Cyco and Amir and Motu and Bikki. They acted, bunked and missed the class to find a proof. To check Koel's bag, Bikki fakes seeing a rat and Motu steals a key from Koel's bag, but it is not the Music Room Key. The new vice principal is ignoring and opposing everything Lekha Mam says. Sanya and Tanya want to go back to Koel, but she shows them a cold shoulder, so they feel bad and try to help Priyanka. When Addy and Kajal go to music room to find proof they got a key on which letter N is written and they doubt on Nihaal.
| 62 | "This For That" | 1 May 2007 | 162 |
The Pink band cleared everything to get a proof. When they reached in the class Addy frankly doubt at Nihaal but he also prove that he is not the thief. Then they doubt on Koel. Addy called her in voice of Nihaal to prove something. Then their new principal told them that they are not allowed to take anyone's help. Then they doubt on Shehnaz mam but they discover there was a party in her house that day and she was there. Then they all got confused that who is the thief. Then Priyanka said that the only plan is to request Shehnaz Mam. Then they went there and request her. She said that she will agree only if they disband "Pink Band".
| 63 | "Who is the Culprit?" | 2 May 2007 | 163 |
Priyanka tells the girls that they should not fall for Shenaz ma'am's blackmailing to break up Pink Band. So, they say a big no to the offer put forward by Shenaz ma'am. Addy again comes up with an idea where they hide behind the music room's curtains to find the culprit. The pune locks the room and they are caught in the room. They spend their time eating and sleeping. Finally the clock strikes ten and the girls along with Motu decides to leave. But before they leave they see a shadow of a man wearing a cap who is about to jump through the window into the music room.
| 64 | "And We Got The Proof!" | 3 May 2007 | 164 |
Priyanka and her other friends hide in the music room. They found someone coming to steal in music room. They attacked at him and tried to catch him but they failed. Then they gathered and Aamir got the thief's cap. Then the watchmen saw them and warned them. Priyanka saw a horrible dream and woke up. Next day they planned to call police and told everyone that if the thief confesses them he will escape otherwise the police will find him out and put him in the jail. And when they were sitting in the common room the peon confessed that his son did it and the thief pleases.
| 65 | "Thanks thief!" | 7 May 2007 | 165 |
Kisna Told them that why did he need to steal. He said that all the students of Heritage High are rolemodels for him. He wanted to become a student but could not afford to. So, he stole the instruments. He promised that he will confess to whole the school. Then Parvati ma'am called the senior students to rusticate the pink band and when they called out all the names Kisna Entered and saved The Pink Band. Koel failed again. Then he goes to the office with the Parvati Menon and gets scolded. The Pink Band tried to save him. They explain to her that he wanted to be a student and that's why he sold the instruments. But she says it was the old staff's problem. Finally, Sadu arrives and says it was the old staff's problem and that he will handle it. Note: This episode aired during the Lose Control Summer Block. Dhoom Machaao Dhoom broke the Disney Channel policy of sixty-five episodes to more than one hundred episodes, like Hannah Montana, That's So Raven, and The Suite Life of Zack & Cody.

=== Season 3: May–July 2007 ===
| No. | Title | Original release date | Prod. code |
|---|---|---|---|
| 66 | "Parvati Menon-Gonna be a Troublemaker" | 8 May 2007 | 166 |
With Sadu back, things are back under control. He forgives Kisna and The Pink Band is happy that Koel's dirty tricks have failed again. Parvati Mams attitude annoyed Lekha Ma'am and pink band. Koel fools Sanya and Tanya and makes them her friends again. It was known that she was sent by Koel's father to rusticate the black band. In the meeting Lekha ma'am was fed up from Parvati Ma'am's rules and was forced to resign. Parvati Menon kept insulting Lecture and kept putting her down and insulting her.
| 67 | "PTA Meeting-DANGER!" | 9 May 2007 | 167 |
The Parent Teacher Association Meeting is fast approaching and Pink band is feeling nervous that their parents would be informed about their rustication. Addy feels nervous in the class because his parents were coming specially to attend the PTA Meeting from the village he is from. But he had told all his friends that his father works in America and his family is fancy. He tries to find a new mother and father for the PTA meeting to meet Parvati Ma'am the next day. Due to his tension, he arrives late to class, only to find Parvati Menon teaching English as Lekha Ma'am has taken a week's leave and tries to sneak in. But he is caught by PM.
| 68 | "Addy The Daddy of the Cool in Danger!!" | 10 May 2007 | 168 |
After arriving in class late and without permission Parvati Mam rusticates Addy. But he pretends that his mother was sick and he got late and Parvati ma'am excused him. Next day at the PTA Meeting his acting mother came and Parvati Ma'am is confused how his sick mother came. Then his real mother enters the school and asks about Addy. Nihaal surprises her when he tells her that he is with his mother. Maya Sethi, Priyanka's mother, has an argument with Parvati Menon and Addy tries to make his false mother leave. Nihal tells Addy that he doesn't get into trouble and that he can bunk the PTA meeting, without getting into trouble and Amir starts thinking. Addy's mother asks herself how can he be with his mother in the meeting room.
| 69 | "Bad Luck" | 14 May 2007 | 169 |
Nihal is excited to learn that Addy's mother is from India and not from America and is determined to embarrass Addy in front of his friends. But, as he is passing by, he runs into Amir who takes Addy's mother over and shows her around Heritage High, only to waste time and prevent her from entering the PTA Meeting, where Addy is seated with his acting mother. Priyanka's mother is still arguing with Parvati Menon, until Rajiv Tolani, Koel's father stands up and says something about The Pink Band being rusticated, a week ago. Priyanka, Malini, KJ, and Bikki are shocked that their parents have to hear this. After the meeting, they apologize to their parents and PM asks Addy about his mother's broken hip, but he bails himself out. On the way for an after celebration to the canteen, Addy is seen by his real mother, who calls him Champu. Addy is embarrassed in front of his friends.
| 70 | "Hey Champs" | 15 May 2007 | 170 |
Everyone learns Addy's real name- Champu and leave him to talk to his mother. His mother is upset because he lied to his friends about his name (Champu to Addy), parents and place of birth (Rohtak in Haryana) and because he has friends who lie, too. Priyanka, Malini, Kajal, Bikki, Cyco, Motu and Aamir are very upset that he lied to them. Nihal overhears Addy and his mother's conversation and decides to ridicule him. Nihal, Koel, Sanya and Tanya make fun of Addy and call him Champu, Champs and embarrass him. Priyanka tells Sanya-Tanya that they should not make fun of Addy or the next time Koel ill-treats them, they should not come to them for help. Addy begs for forgiveness, because PM caned him. All his friends feel sorry for him and KJ says "How Dare She Beat MY Addy!". PM is keeping a close watch on Addy for one month. Amir and Addy try to find out why PM has come to Heritage High.
| 71 | "Cordially Invited" | 16 May 2007 | 171 |
Addy and Amir are determined to learn all they can about Nihal's family and background. Amir tries to squeeze into Nihal's house by calling him brother, acting very nice to him and inviting him to play basketball with him, Addy, Cyco and Motu. Addy and gang decide tk meet after school somewhere, so just to go to Nihal's house, they pile on to him. But, Nihal tells them he'll decide later. In the Girls' Locker Room, Koel tells Sanya and Tanya that Nihal and Shenaz mam said that they should not be in the band the ROCKSTARZ and so they are out. This time, Priyanka and her friends do feel bad for Sanya and Tanya because Koel embarrasses them in front of the whole school by making them sing, but not to do anything because of their attitude the previous day. In the common room, Cyco tells Priyanka about the bet between him and Addy- Addy thinks Nihal's mother will be a singer (Bikki agrees) and Cyco thinks she is a police officer. Nihal wants to tell The Pink Band and Stupid Guys, as he calls them, who he is. So, he invites Amir and his friends for dinner to his house the next evening. Perfect time to show how important he is.
| 72 | "Parvati Menon, Music Society and A Nihal Singh Rathod Dinner" | 17 May 2007 | 172 |
Nihal is thrilled but when he tells Koel about his plan she says that her father says he should not go ahead with it and let his secret out. But Nihal refused to cancel the dinner and decided to invite a few of his friends- Koel, Sanya and Tanya. Priyanka is a little reluctant to go to Nihal's house because she is uncomfortable. but, all her friends blackmail and persuade her to go with them and finally, she agrees. The next day in school, The Pink Band read on the notice board that Nihal has opened a music society and is the president of the music society. In class, Priyanka tries to undo what Nihal has set up and tries to become the president of the music committee herself but Parvart Menon says that he has taken permission from her. When they reach Nihals' house, it is an unpleasant surprise to see Koel, Sanya and Tanya. While discussing his mother, Nihal introduces her to Priyanka, Bikki, Malini, Kajal, Motu, Cyco, Addy, Amir, Sanya and Tanya-his mother is Parvati Menon.
| 73 | "Secrets, Secrets... They Are OUT!" | 21 May 2007 | 173 |
Priyanka, Bikki, Kj, Malini, Amir, Addy, Motu, Cyco, Sanya and Tanya are surprised to learn that PM is Nihal's mother. With big eyes and surprised faces, PM tells all her guests to eat dinner, but now all of them feel uncompfortable. Addy and Cyco start questioning Nihal about their surnames and Nihal says that his mother didn't change her maiden name. Koel tells Sanya and Tanya about her knowing about PM being Nihal's mother and about Mission "Rustication of The Pink Band". Finally, PM tells them to eat dessert and that she will see them the next day. While leaving, Tanya and Sanya tell to save them (they told PM about the Pink Band's rustication and she called their father to school the next day and called Rajiv Tolani and asked him why he told Koel about it). Then they blurted out Koel's rustication plan for the Pink band and the Pink Band and friends hear this. Nihal had no idea about the plan and is confused.
| 74 | "Officially Nihal's Mom, Broken friendships and Important Signatures!" | 22 May 2007 | 174 |
Koel is pissed off with Sanya and Tanya and she makes sure that they would not want to go to heritage high the next day. The Pink Band and Boy Gang are chatting about their new shock. At home, Priyanka and her mother Mala Sethi had been getting blank calls since that evening and Priyanka tells her mother about PM being Nihal's mother. Her mother is shocked and tells Priyanka that if Parvati Menon tries to remove them from school, their parents will still be by their side. The next day, the whole of class 11A learns that PM is Nihal's mother when one of the students asks her and she says yes. In the office, Nihal asks his mother why and what she had planned with Rajiv Tolani and they both fight. As Priyanka has asked PM to take votes for the music society, that is confirmed. Malini stops speaking to Amir because her friends asked her to tell him to not speak to Nihal but he refused. Priyanka denies singing for the music society from Nihal and the rest of the Pink band make fun of Koel when she comes to ask for their signatures. But when Shenaz mam tells Priyanka there will be elections for the Music Society's president, she becomes excited and is forced to sign.
| 75 | "Worst Best Friends and Enemies" | 23 May 2007 | 175 |
Priyanka tells Shanaz Mam and Nihal that she would speak to the Pink Band and will then tell them whether she would run for the elections and sign up for the Music Society. On hearing about all this from Priyanka, the unnecessary rebel KJ strikes again and freaks out. She says Priyanka is always leading them, thinks everyone else is wrong, makes all decisions on her own and is running for the elections just to beat Nihal and not for music. Koel's father warns Parvati menon but she remains firm and tells him she will work the way she wants to. Addy and KJ do not talk to anyone else that day and Priyanka signs up for the music society. She and Nihal shake hands and officially become and call each other enemies. Motu and Bikki tell Priyanka that she should come to hear Amir's new poem and Cyco and Malini tell KJ and Addy to come to the common room to see a few more of Motu's designs. Priyanka and KJ are not happy to see each other, but are forced to sit together and reason out their problems with each other. But it doesn't go too well when Priyanka tells KJ to compete in the elections too. Rebellion KJ agrees.
| 76 | "I Am wrong? Are We Wrong?" | 24 May 2007 | 176 |
A little girl from class 5D goes to Nihal and tells him that she wants to join the music society and that she wants to stand for the elections. Koel, as usual, decides to mean and rude to Sam and Sam cuts Koel off by telling Nihal that this fool interrupts their conversation. But, she is not allowed to run for the elections as she is too young. She is Priyanka and the Pink Band's biggest fan and now decided to campaign for Priyanka. All of Kajal and Priyanka's friends are very upset with them and do not know whose side they should take. KJ freezes when Addy says "Statue" and he keeps talking about the elections. Then, she tells him that this silly game of statue, and this topic are over for the rest of their lives. On the forms, it is required for the signature of a Class 12 and A Class 11 student. KJ and Priyanka go to Amir for a signature but Amir refuses to sign for any of them. Now, Koel is very happy that the best day in her life has come- Breaking up of the Pink Band. Priyanka gets Cyco's signature and on the way to submit her form, meets Shenaz Mam who tells her that she heard about KJ and her fight. KJ gets Addy's,{Champu's} signature and meets Sam on the way who gets her thinking. Outside the music room, the two guilty friends meet- KJ asks Priyanka whether what they were doing was right.
| 77 | "Friends, Lies and Unfair Healthy Cpmpetition" | 31 May 2007 | 177 |
KJ and Priyanka decide to stop fighting and KJ apologizes & tells her to run for president and Beat that Nihal. Priyanka tells KJ to be her campaign manager. They go in together but Nihal says they are too late. On the form it was written that reporting time for submitionby 9.00 am. But KJ and Priyanka reach at 9.05 am. Nihal is satisfied that he can become the unopposed president of the music society. They go to Parvati Menon to complain but she acts rude and sides her son, but then Sadu arrives and allows Priyanka to run for president. Bikki and Malini are glad that the Pink Ban dis back in action. Sadu warns Nuhal about his attitude and behaviour. Sam lies and tells Nihal that Priyanka told her that PM is his mother and impresses Bikki and Malini by talking all about Priyanka and the Pink Band and telling them she is their biggest fan. Koel is planning to beat Nihal and become the ultimate rockstar. Later, KJ and Addy fight to be Priyanka's Campaign Manager- ending in favour of KJ. Then Nihal approaches and bobards Priyanka and she says he is always unfair and cannot do anything about the fairness in Heritage High from now on since Sadu's back. Nihal decides that this battle should become unfair Healthy competition.
| 78 | "Mastermind Challenges, Priyanka Vs Nihal and Excellent Plans While Champu is on Fire!" | 4 June 2007 | 178 |
Priyanka and Nihal get so irritated with each other that they both ignore their friends and walk away. When Priyanka goes home, she tells her mother all about her day. Her mother says that she is lucky to have such an exciting life. Malini calls and tells Priyanka that she is sorry that she cannot be by her side during the elections because her grandmother got very sick and she will have to go to Dehradun. The next day, Sam starts campaigning for Priyanka and when she sees Koel, she acts rude again. KJ and Addy again argue about being Campaign Manager. Addy suggests a plan of feeding ice cream to all the candidates who vote for Priyanka, which is rejected until Koel is seen bribing the students with gifts in exchange for their voting for Nihal. Then, pissed off Priyanka challenges Koel and tells her that even she will play according to unfair terms. Meanwhile Koel has already started being rude to her new band members Janet and Vishal. Addy is really good at cutting calls and cuts through Koal and Nihal's conversation and overhears their plan. He is ready to tell the world what a genius he is.
| 79 | "Friendship Bands, Strike Karo Sahi Note Sab Karo Priyanka Ko Vote and Step by Step Campaigning!" | 5 June 2007 | 179 |
Addy cuts through the Pink band's conversation and tells them all about Koel's plan. KJ comes up with a plan relating to that. The next day in school, Ponk Band distributes friendship bands in the common room, which is a hit and they got many students on their side, until Parvati menon arrived and sent everyone to their classes. Bikki got posters done for Priyanka, but when she goes to class to find them, Koel had stolen them and Rockstars were unhappy because someone leaked out their plan to the Pink Band. Koel doubts on Janet and Vishal, and they quit the Rockstars. Sam is campaigning for Priyanka and asks Priyanka whether she can be a composer for her Heritage High Theme Song, Kj's next step to make Priyanka win. Priyanka says yes, just to make Sam happy. KJ realizes that the rivalry increased and it will take a few rounds for the Pink Band vs Rockstars. The scre is 1 and 1. Sam accedantally tells Koel that she is composing the next song for Priyanka. Koel plans to steal their idea and use it to Nihal's use.
| 80 | "Get Ready for the Rocking Rockstars Priyanka!!" | 6 June 2007 | 180 |
The day for the elections has finally arrived and round one is on its way. Bikki got new posters to put up, but somenone had already put up banners saying vote for Priyanka. This person was Samira. She told Bikki that she is the junior Campaign Manager. Koel gets her plan in action. The Rockstars take up the challenge of a suggestion of a few words and compose a song, right then. Lekha Mam returns from her month-long holiday and learns about the elections. Addy says something about PM and Nihal and he have a physical fight. KJ and Bikki are really irritated with Sam. Round one of the elections is the question and answer round. As of now, according to Cyco, the chances are 50-50. Nihal is ready to thram Priyanka and give her the greatest question that she will be unable to answer.
| 81 | "Election Selection" | 10 June 2007 | 181 |
The great question was not too tough for Priyanka at all, all thanks to Kisna. Priyanka had promised him that she will teach him English, but failed to do so. But, Kisna said that Priyanka had taught him that self-help was the best and he already started learning English. The votes were cast. Then, Sadu came up on stage and announced that Priyanka had been selected president. Nihal went to Pm and got upset with her. Sam asked Priyanka whether she could be in their band and they said they would tell her the next day. An all India Band Competition is being held for which the Ponk Band have already applied. A letter from the competition comes, for entry into the first round, automatically. Unfortunately it was given in PM.s hands. She planned to give it to the Rockstarz.
| 82 | "Registration No., Odd Envelopes & Sam-Ira Problems..." | 11 June 2007 | 182 |
The Pink Band register themselves for the All India Band Competition. The lady on the phone give them a registration number, which is 16 digits and unfortunately, they do not have a pen or paper. The number was Mum889956671566787, which Bikki, KJ, Priyanka and Addy broke up to remember in bits, but because Sam comes in the middle they refuse to let her join the Pink band and she is heartbroken and they forget the Number. KJ and gang see PM with an envelope and see the same envelope with Nihal, which is for direct entry for The AIBC. Koel tells Amir all about it and he tells the girls. Later that evening, Samira's father comes to Heritage High and yells at the Pink Band (except Malini who is not there) and tells them that Sam ran away from home, because they were rude to her.
| 83 | "News, Press and Media" | 12 June 2007 | 183 |
Sam's father threatens Heritage High and The Pink Band and tells Priyanka, Bikki and KJ that he will send them to jail and close down Heritage High, if Sam is not found. But, Sadu gets angry with him and tells him that Heritage High is not responsible for Samira running away but are still very happy to help. KJ, Priyanka and Bikki go to the girls' locker room and break down. But, bold Priyanka decides not to feel afraid and persuades her friends to face this problem as they have faced many problems before. At the canteen, Amir orders six sandwiches and milkshakes, but the chef says that the bread and milk has been lost, and possibly stolen, so Amir orders salads. After being called to the Atrium, on the way the press begins questioning the three 17-year-old girls and they have nothing to say.
| 84 | "KJ's Threat" | 13 June 2007 | 184 |
Sadu comes and helps the Pink Band, He says any question to be asked should be asked by him and he would answer. All friends of the Pink Band tell them to leave and Addy makes a joke, they yell at him and he gets upset and leaves. Later KJ apologizes and Addy forgives her. Mala Sethi turns on the TV to find her daughter and her friends in big trouble and decides to go to Heritage High. is being pestered for the blame of being rude to her and driving her away. But, in Sadu's office, after being pestered about the same matter KJ is angered and tells the school officials, Inspector and Samira Gupta's father that if they think the situation will become any better if the Pink Band are not in Heritage High, they are willing to leave.
| 85 | "Someone Says Priyanka!" | 17 June 2007 | 185 |
Sadu refuses to let The Pink Band leave Heritage High. There is a big protest outside the Principal's office with parents threatening to take their children out of Heritage High if the Pink Band is not thrown out. When Amir goes to the canteen, he hears the boy saying that the sandwiches and milk and juice has been getting stolen from the canteen since the last three days. Amir comes to a point of realization and tells KJ, Priyanka and Bikki to search for am in school. Registration is a funny thing too when Addy fakes a heart ttck because the line is too long. When Sadu says that if Sam is not found in 24 hours, the Pink Band will be removed from Heritage High. Priyanka's, KJ and Bikki's parents come to meet their daughters. When the girls apologize to Sam and accept to take her into the Pink Band on camera, she shouts out Priyaka's name.
| 86 | "Fair Game" | 18 June 2007 | 186 |
The Pink Band is glad that Sam is back and that they can still be in Heritage High. Malini comes back from Dehradun and tells Priyanka that her father is fine and asks her what happened and who their new band member is. Sam corrects the girls as they practice. The girls are thrilled to be back together. The day for the Indian Rockers auditions has finally arrived. Nihal learns that his mother plans to remove the Pink Band from school again and becomes upset and tells her that he wishes she was not his mother. At the auditions, it's the Pink Band's turn and Nihal says that her enemy's good luck is with them. He decided to be fair and go for the auditions.
| 87 | "Broken Hearts" | 19 May 2007 | 187 |
The Pink Band goes in and Bikki picks up her tambourine but the judges say that tambourine is not a real instrument and that Bikki cannot take part. But the Pink Band insists on having Bikki in their performance. Outside, Bikki starts crying and it's the Rockstarz's turn. They go in and sing Heritage High School. The results are out and Drumming dudes, singing fools, The Rockstarz and the Pink Band are taken in for the finals. There was a tie between the Pink Band and the Rockstarz. At school, Nihal's mother feels guilty and tells Tolani on the phone that she resigns. More good news for the Pink Band.
| 88 | "Save the Last Dance, Priyanka" | 20 June 2007 | 188 |
Parvati Menon tells Rajiv Tolani that she is done working for him and that she will resign if she has to. He comes to school and threatens her and says Nihal cannot stay in Heritage Gigh if she is not working here. Sadu tells PM to let Nihal be in Heritage High and she agrees but Niahl doesn't know this. Cyco shocks everyone with his charming dress code and Motu had designed it. Priyanka and Nihal make an entrance together! It is Nihal's last night at Heritage High, and he asks Priyanka to forget their differences and dance with him, for a memorable night. Note: This episode (the part from the socials) was shot after a one month break. That is why the shooting had all the stars saying hi to each other and meeting each other.
| 89 | "I Never, Never Before!" | 18 June 2007 | 189 |
Priyanka says yes and dances with Nihal. KJ feels jealous because Addy dances with Koel Everyone plays a game "I Never" to celebrate PM's resignation. KJ is so mad with Addy that she is ready to leave. Cyco, Motu, Bikki and Addy are selected for the game because the music stops on them when they were holding the glass. Nihal leaves. Koel threatens her father and says that she will also leave Heritage High if Nihal leaves. Priyanka discovers that her father was the blank caller when she goes back home. Her mother tells her that she didn't tell her about her father because she thought that he might take Priyanka away from her. Note: Aarti Sinha left the cast. The songs Heritage High School and Abhi Abhi are featured.
| 90 | "Daddy's Day" | 19 June 2007 | 190 |
Priyanka's mother apologizes for hiding that her father wants to meet her. Nihal comes back because Sadu and Lecture think it would be right. Priyanka has a problem and is confused. To her surprise Nihal and Lekha Ma'am help. When she is playing on the guitar, she thinks about Nihal and when he tells her something about "feellings are feelings they are not correct nor wrong. The way you express them is right or wrong". In class. Priyanka walks in late and Lekha mam starts playing a game in class. You pick a situation and then express how you feel in one word. When Priyanka apologizes to Lekhs mam, she tells her that if the situation is between two feelings, then think from your heart. Then To Priyanka's terror and shock, her father comes to school and wants to meet her. Nihal informs Priyanka. Note: This is the third episode in which Priyanka's crush on Nihal is displayed. The first was Save the Last Dance, Priyanka and the second, I Never, Never Before!
| 91 | "Thoughts and Ideas--Good and Bad" | 20 June 2007 | 191 |
Priyanka says no and doesn't meet her father. Malini and Bikki make Kajal realise that she is very mean to Addy. His mother comes to school and gives laddoos because he has got the chicken-pox. KJ feels ver bad. Addy didn't come to class and KJ volunteered to give his mother the notes. Addy's mother tells KJ how sweet she is. KJ is really embarrassed. Nihal is trying to be friends with Priyanka. But Priyanka somehow does not seem to realize that. Motu, Amir and Cyco make her realize but Koel puts up a poster about Priyanka and her father, signed The Rockstars. Priyanka thinks Nihal is responsible for it and is waiting to take revenge. Note: Priyanka and Nihal resume their animosity in this episode.
| 92 | "Date Clash!" | 21 June 2007 | 192 |
Priyanka is waiting to take revenge on Nihal. Champu's mother keeps coming to Heritage High and likes KJ now. Bikki is having trouble studying. After the pinboard incident Priyanka yells at Nihal and sets him against her forever. Amir tries to make them understand that there is a misundersatanding and that they should not fight. The Pink Band and The Rockstars get telegrams to arrive at the venue of All India Band Competition and the date and time is 25 June 11 exactly when they have their first exam. They both --The Pink Band and The Rockstars-- might have to drop out of the competition.
| 93 | "Allergic to Lemons?(1)" | 25 June 2007 | 193 |
Champu's mother goes to the competition venue and threatens the people, she gets a form for the Pink Band. Koel to get the Pink Band out of the competition, invites everyone for an end of exams celebration. She remembers Priyanka is allergic to lemons and puts much of it in the food. Priyanka faints, drops the plate, and falls.
| 94 | "Allergic to Lemons?(2)" | 26 June 2007 | 194 |
Priyanka is in a sad state and her temperature is 104 degrees. She will not be able to play. But with her spirit high, she valiantly goes for the competition. She is up on stage. Her voice is gone.
| 95 | "Nihal mein Himmat?" | 27 June 2007 | 195 |
Priyanka has a problem and cannot sing. Malini gives the prescription of her medicine to Aamir. He buys it and sneaks Sam in. The Rockstars give a rocking performance. The Pink Band is voted to be given another chance to sing. They give their best performances. The two male judges like the Pink Performance but the female one doesn't. Koel tells Nihaal that she caused Priyanka's lemon allergy. He says that they had to play fairly and win. Koel challenges him to go and tell the judges that she caused the Loss of the Pink Band.
| 96 | "Koel's Influence!" | 28 June 2007 | 196 |
Nihal doesn't tell the judges about Koel for the reputation of the Rockstars. Bikki is told off for playing the tambourine but is convinced not to get upset by her friends. Priyanka is weak but better. The Pink Band is selected along with the Rockstars and gives a rocking 2nd performance. Koel tells Nihal about her plan that's in work to vote the Pink Band out and Nihal says no.
| 97 | "Black Out Sam (1)" | 2 July 2007 | 197 |
Koel's father gives her a car because she passes the second round. Sam is ill but wants to see the Pink band perform. Tantra is voted out. Pink Band is the second most voted Band. Hearing this, Sam faints.
| 98 | "Black Out Sam (2)" | 3 July 2007 | 198 |
Sam is rushed to hospital. It is known that she has a hole in her heart. The Pink Band along with Rockstars reach the Finals. Koel tells one of the organizers that if she wins, she will get her a permanent job with her father.
| 99 | "ROCKSTARZ" | 4 July 2007 | 199 |
Sam gives Priyanka a notebook in which she wrote her compositions for the Pink Band to sing, even though she is in hospital. She says nothing will happen to her if the win. Rockstars give an energetic performance. Koel puts her plan in action. A new student, Suraj, who is a poet, has written Dhoom Machaao Dhoom in his book, (Koel's plan) to say that he has composed it--after the Pinks sing it, to get them disqualified.
| 100 | "It's Pink Pink Pink all The Way, Finale" | 5 July 2007 | 100 |
Koel's plan to disqualify the Pink Band fails because they do not sing Dhoom Machaao Dhoom. They sing the song that Sam wrote for them, for Sam. The final lists of ranks in the Exams are out. Nihal and Cyco top and Priyanka comes 2nd. KJ Malini and Koel do very well too. But Bikki fails with 34%. The final day of the competition arrives and Koel tries a new plan-her father bribes the vote counters to make Rockstarz win, but The Pink Band wins anyway.
