= Indraneil Sengupta =

Indian actor and model (born 1974)

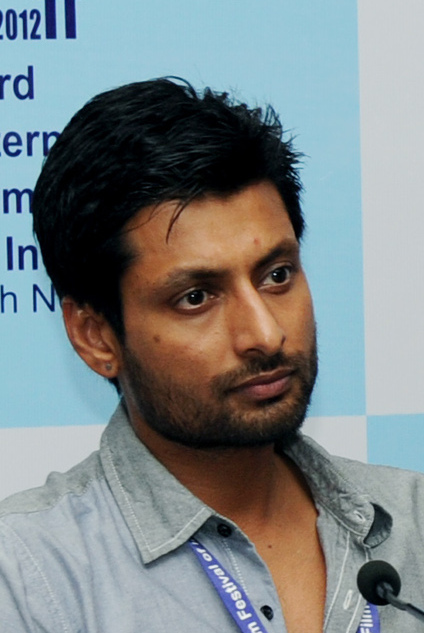
- Sengupta in 2012
- Born: 8 September 1974 (age 52)
- Education: Scottish Church College University of London
- Occupations: Model, actor
- Years active: 2004–present
- Known for: Kahaani, Autograph Arundhati, Mishawr Rawhoshyo
- Spouse: Barkha Bisht (m. 2008; div. 2022)
- Children: 1

Indraniel Sengupta (Bengali pronunciation: [indronil ʃenɡupto]), is an Indian actor and model who works in Hindi and Bengali films and television.

== Early life ==
Sengupta was born on 8 September 1974 in Assam, India, to a Bengali Hindu family. He completed his education from Scottish Church College in Kolkata, India and then attended the University of London. Later, he started his career as a Model.

== Career ==
Sengupta was a finalist of the 1999 Gladrags Manhunt Contest in which John Abraham was the winner. He modelled for designer Rohit Bal and worked for choreographers Marc Robinson and Achala Sachdev. He also appeared in commercials for the Tata Indigo Marina car, VIP Frenchie and Aquafina.

Later, he transitioned into music videos, including those for Falguni Pathak's "Pal pal tere yaad sataye" and Jagjit Singh; one for the south Indian singer Yesudas's Hindi album; and a remix of the old film song "Koi diya jale kahin (rum pum bum)", sung by Asha Bhosle from the movie Bees Saal Baad. He also appeared in a television show on Star Plus, Pyaar Ke Do Naam: Ek Raadha, Ek Shyaam.

In 2004, he starred in the film Shukriya: Till Death Do Us Apart which also starred Aftab Shivdasani, Shriya Saran and Anupam Kher. He was to act in the movie Dus but the project got shelved.

In 2008, he played the negative role of Mohan Kanta, a British Indian army man who betrays his revolting pro-independence military regiment in the horror film 1920, written and directed by Vikram Bhatt. He also starred as Tushar in the Zee TV serial Banoo Main Teri Dulhan.

He appeared with his wife in Nach Baliye 3 as a late entrant.

He starred in Bollywood movies Mumbai Salsa and Kahaani. He also appeared in few Bengali films. In 2008, he starred in Janala, also starring Swastika Mukherjee and directed by Buddhadeb Dasgupta.

At the beginning of 2009, he starred opposite Indrani Haldar in Angshumaner Chhobi, which was directed by first-time filmmaker, Atanu Ghosh. The film was the only Bengali entry in the competitive section of the Indian Panorama in Goa. In late 2009, he starred as a bisexual lover in Kaushik Ganguly's Arekti Premer Golpo. His love interest in this film is director Rituparno Ghosh, and this was Rituparno's first movie as an actor.

In 2010, he did his first commercial Bengali film, Jodi Ekdin, directed by Riingo. Indraneil received the Anandalok Fresh Face of the Year (male) award in 2009 for Anshumaner Chobi.

Indraneil starred as a young aspiring director in the Bengali movie Autograph with Prasenjit Chatterjee and Nandana Sen. The movie is a tribute to both Satyajit Ray and to Uttam Kumar as it is on the lines of the film Nayak.

In 2012, he acted in the Aniruddha Roy Chowdhury-directed Bengali movie Aparajita Tumi, in which he played a young Bangladeshi professor. He played the role of a criminal in the Hindi film Kahaani, directed by Sujoy Ghosh in the same year. In 2012 he also played a role in a Bangladeshi movie, Chorabali.

He also starred in Goyenda Gogol, which was released in 2013. He also starred in Teen Patti, a Bengali film directed by Jenny Sarkar and Dipayan Mandal.

He is selected by Sandip Ray to play the Bengali sleuth Feluda in Hatyapuri (2022), which is the second reboot of Feluda film franchise and a loose sequel of the first reboot film Badshahi Angti (2014). Also, he appeared as Feluda in the sequel Nayan Rahasya (2024).

== Personal life ==
On 1 March 2008, Sengupta married Barkha Bisht who was his co-star in Doli Saja Ke and Pyaar ke do naam...Ek Radha Ek Shyaam. They have a daughter named Meira, who was born in October 2011. They got officially divorced in 2022.

He is dating Bengali Actress Ishaa Saha as of now.

== Filmography ==
=== Films ===
| Year | Title | Role | Language | |
|---|---|---|---|---|
| 2004 | Shukriya: Till Death Do Us Apart | Yash | Hindi | |
| 2007 | Mumbai Salsa | Karan Kapoor | Hindi | |
| 2008 | 1920 | Mohan Kant | Hindi | |
| 2009 | Angshumaner Chhobi | Angshuman | Bengali | |
| 2009 | Janala | Bimal Guha | Bengali | |
| 2010 | Arekti Premer Golpo | Basu | Bengali | |
| 2010 | Jodi Ekdin | Neil Basu | Bengali | |
| 2010 | Autograph | Shuvobrata | Bengali | |
| 2011 | Bedini | Keshta | Bengali | |
| 2011 | System | Eklavya | Bengali | |
| 2011 | Uro Chithi | Aniket Dasgupta | Bengali | |
| 2012 | Aparajita Tumi | Yusuf | Bengali | |
| 2012 | Kahaani | Arnav Bagchi/Milan Damji | Hindi | |
| 2012 | Elar Char Adhyay | Atindra | Bengali | |
| 2012 | Dashami | Abhi | Bengali | |
| 2012 | Chorabali | Sumon | Bengali | |
| 2013 | Sweetheart | | Bengali | |
| 2013 | Goyenda Gogol | Ashok Thakur | Bengali | |
| 2013 | C/O Sir | Ranabir | Bengali | |
| 2013 | Satyanweshi | Himangshu | Bengali | |
| 2013 | Satyagraha | Akhilesh | Hindi | |
| 2013 | Rupkatha Noy | Sananda's husband | Bengali | |
| 2013 | Nayika Sangbad | Bijit | Bengali | |
| 2013 | Mishor Rohoshyo | Hani Alkadi | Bengali | |
| 2014 | Obhishopto Nighty | Raja/Alok | Bengali | |
| 2014 | Jilmil Jonak | Cameo | Assamese | |
| 2014 | Teen Patti | Arya | Bengali | |
| 2014 | Samrat & Co. | Vijay Singh | Hindi | |
| 2014 | Children of War | Amir | Hindi | |
| 2014 | Arundhati | Kaal Rudra | Bengali | |
| 2014 | Gogoler Kirti | Ashok Thakur | Bengali | |
| 2015 | Shajarur Kanta | Debasish | Bengali | |
| 2015 | Calendar Girls | Shashank | Hindi | |
| 2016 | Mahanayika | Priyabrata Roy | Bengali | |
| 2016 | Shororipu | Shekhar | Bengali | |
| 2016 | Samraat: The King Is Here | Raja | Bengali | |
| 2016 | & Jara Hatke | Aakash | Marathi | |
| 2016 | Tobu Aporichito | Debashis | Bengali | |
| 2016 | Kiriti O Kalo Bhromor | Kiriti Roy | Bengali | |
| 2017 | Sargoshiyan | Vikram Roy | Hindi | |
| 2017 | Aroni Tokhon | | Bengali | |
| 2017 | Boss 2 | Bidyut Shivalkar | Bengali | |
| 2017 | III Smoking Barrels | Anuraag Dutta | Multilingual | |
| 2017 | B.A.Pass 2 | Ritesh | Hindi | |
| 2017 | Lagori | Gaurav | Hindi | |
| 2017 | Biporjoy | | Bengali | |
| 2018 | Aschhe Abar Shabor | Bijoy Sen | Bengali | |
| 2018 | Nilacholey Kiriti | Kiriti Roy | Bengali | |
| 2018 | Aithe 2.0 | Avinash Ganguly | Telugu | |
| 2018 | Mulk | Aftab Mohammad | Hindi | |
| 2019 | Devaki | | Kannada | |
| 2021 | Choices | Vishal | Hindi | |
| 2021 | 200: Halla Ho | IPS Sameer Deshpande | Hindi | |
| 2021 | Torulatar Bhoot | Viki Ghosh | Bengali | |
| 2022 | Doctor G | Dr. Ashok Gupta | Hindi | |
| 2022 | Hatyapuri | Feluda | Bengali | |
| 2022 | Chalti Rahe Zindagi | Arjun | Hindi | |
| 2023 | Kaberi Antardhan | | Bengali | |
| 2023 | Chor Nikal Ke Bhaga | Sudhanshu Roy | Hindi | |
| 2023 | A Winter Tale at Shimla | Chintan | Hindi | |
| 2023 | Aazam | DCP Ajay Joshi | Hindi | |
| 2024 | Shesh Rokkha | Satabdo Chatterjee | Bengali | |
| 2024 | Hubba | CID Officer | Bengali | |
| 2024 | Nayan Rahasya | Feluda | Bengali | |
| 2025 | Puratawn | Rajeev | Bengali | |
| 2025 | Maa | Shuvankar Dasgupta | Hindi | |
| 2025 | Nandini | | Bengali | Bangladeshi film |
| 2025 | Lokkhikantopur Local | Ani | Bengali | |
| 2025 | Lawho Gouranger Naam Rey | Parthasarathi , a successful actor | Bengali | |

=== Web series ===
| Year | Title | Role | Platform | Notes |
|---|---|---|---|---|
| 2019 | Tadap | Azeem | Ullu | |
| 2020 | Kark Rogue | | ZEE5 Originals | |
| 2020 | Love and Affairs | Abhishek | Hoichoi | |
| 2020 | Abhay | Kiran Dagar | ZEE5 | Season 2 |
| 2020–2022 | The Gone Game | Prateek Jindal | Voot Select | |
| 2021 | Aranyak | Ravi | Netflix | |
| 2021 | Human | Neil | Hotstar Specials | |
| 2022 | Mithya | Vishal | ZEE5 Originals | |
| 2022 | The Fame Game | Ajay | Netflix | |
| 2022 | Bloody Brothers | Shekhar | ZEE5 Originals | |
| 2022 | The Broken News | Pankaj Awasthi | ZEE Originals | |
| 2023 | Aarya season 3 | Sooraj Raizada | Disney+Hotstar | |
| 2025 | Do You Wanna Partner | Sunjoy Roy Chowdhury | Prime Video | |

=== Television ===
| Year | Show | Role | Notes | Ref(s) |
|---|---|---|---|---|
| 2006 | Pyaar Ke Do Naam: Ek Raadha, Ek Shyaam | Kishan | | |
| 2006 | Pyaar Ke Do Naam: Ek Raadha, Ek Shyaam | Shyam Sahay | | |
| 2006 | Pyaar Ke Do Naam: Ek Raadha, Ek Shyaam | Krishna Singh Rathore | | |
| 2006–2007 | Banoo Main Teri Dulhann | Tushar | | |
| 2007 | Aahat | Abhilash | Season 3; Episode - 3 'Khel' | |
| 2007 | Nach Baliye 3 | Contestant | | |
| 2007–2009 | Doli Saja Ke | Daksh Singhania | | |
| 2008–2009 | Maayka | Angad | | |
| 2014 | Tumhari Paakhi | Rohan | | |
| 2014–2015 | Box Cricket League 1 | Contestant | Player in 'Chandigarh Cubs' | |
| 2015 | Maharakshak: Devi | Shukracharya | | |
| 2015 | Darr Sabko Lagta Hai | Avinash | Season 1; Episode 25 | |
| | Box Cricket League 2 | Contestant | Player in 'Chandigarh Cubs' | |
| 2016 | Jamai Raja | Neil Sengupta | | |
| 2017 | Ghulaam | STS officer Raghav Verma | Cameo appearance | |
| 2017–2019 | Nimki Mukhiya | Abhimanyu Rai | | |
| 2018 | Box Cricket League 3 | Contestant | Player in 'Chandigarh Cubs' | |
| 2019 | Box Cricket League 4 | Contestant | Player in 'Kolkata Babu Moshayes' | |
| 2019–2020 | Shrimad Bhagwat Mahapuran | Lord Shiva | | |
| 2019–2020 | Yeh Hai Chahatein | Rajeev Khurana | | |

== Awards ==
- 2008 - ITA Award for Idea Glamour Face of the Year Male
- 2014 - Filmfare Award for Best Supporting Actor (Bengali) for Mishawr Rawhoshyo
