= Choices (2021 film) =

2021 Indian film

- Directed by: Damini Kanwal Shetty; Raaj Shetty
- Written by: Damini Kanwal Shetty
- Produced by: Damini Kanwal Shetty; Raaj Shetty
- Starring: Indraneil Sengupta; Barkha Bisht Sengupta; Karan Veer Mehra; Deeksha Sonalkar
- Edited by: Sankalp Sehgal
- Music by: Dony Hazarika; Raagini Kavathekar
- Distributed by: MX Player
- Release date: 19 August 2021
- Running time: 96 minutes
- Country: India
- Language: Hindi

Choices is a 2021 Indian Hindi-language romantic drama film directed by Damini Kanwal Shetty and Raaj Shetty and written by Damini Kanwal Shetty. The film is produced by Damini Kanwal Shetty and Raaj Shetty under Eternal Flame Production's, the film is based on lockdown. It stars Indraneil Sengupta and Barkha Bisht Sengupta with Karan Veer Mehra and Deeksha Sonalkar making cameo appearances. The film is released on OTT platform on MX Player.

== Plot ==
The film is all about lockdown; the couple has stuck in lockdown severely with no choice. The dark humour has been portrayed the relationship between a couple suddenly challenged under lockdown due to a minuscule virus, how their normal and happy life has become unhappy on daily basis.

== Cast and Crew ==
The main casts of the movie are Indraneil Sengupta, Barkha Bisht Sengupta, Karan Veer Mehra and Deeksha Sonalkar. The producer and director are Damini Kanwal Shetty and Raaj Shetty, the music is composed by Dony Hazarika and Raagini Kavathekar and edited by Sankalp Sehgal.

== Songs ==
| Song | Singer | Lyrics | Music |
|---|---|---|---|
| "Khamoshiyan" | Ragini Kavathekar, Ayaan | Anju Kapoor | Dony Hazarika |
| "Ek Jhini" | Ragini Kavathekar | Suresh Tiwari Yash | Dony Hazarika |
| "Zindegi" | Raaj Jyoti Konwar | Anju Kapoor | Dony Hazarika |
