= Kamya Panjabi =

Indian actress (born 1979)

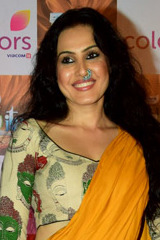
- Panjabi at the Indian Television Academy Awards 2018
- Born: 13 August 1979 (age 47); Mumbai, Maharashtra, India
- Occupations: Actress, politician
- Years active: 2000–present
- Known for: Astitva...Ek Prem Kahani; Banoo Main Teri Dulhann; Shakti - Astitva Ke Ehsaas Ki; Maryada: Lekin Kab Tak; Bigg Boss 7
- Political party: Indian National Congress (27 October 2021-present)
- Spouse(s): Bunty Negi (m. 2003; div. 2013) Shalabh Dang (m. 2020)
- Children: 2

Kamya Panjabi, also known as Kamya Shalabh Dang (born 13 August 1979) is an Indian actress and politician who is known for her work in several Hindi television productions. She is also known for her participation in the Colors TV's reality show Bigg Boss 7 in 2013. She joined the Indian National Congress party on 27 October 2021.

== Career ==
Panjabi became known for portraying negative roles in Indian television serials like Reth, Astitva...Ek Prem Kahani and Banoo Mein Teri Dulhann. Panjabi has also played positive roles in Piya Ka Ghar, Maryada: Lekin Kab Tak and Kyun Hota Hai Pyaar.

She was part of the second season of Comedy Circus comedy show on Sony TV and participated in Bigg Boss 7 in Colors TV.

In 1997, she featured in a music video called Mehndi Mehndi, and was also part of the music video Kala Shah Kala by Anamika. Panjabi featured in minor roles in Bollywood films such as Kaho Naa Pyaar Hai, Na Tum Jaano Na Hum, Yaadein, Phir Bhi Dil Hai Hindustani and Koi Mil Gaya and the Telugu film Maa Aavida Meeda Ottu Mee Aavida Chala Manchidi.

In 2019, Panjabi made her theatre debut in the play Pajama Party with fellow television actress Kavita Kaushik.

== Personal life ==
Panjabi was born on 13 August 1979.

During her time in Bigg Boss 7, Panjabi developed a close friendship with television actress Pratyusha Banerjee. Following Banerjee's suicide, Panjabi released a film based on her life and was sued by Banerjee's former boyfriend.

Panjabi married Bunty Negi in 2003. She gave birth to her daughter Aara in 2009. They divorced in 2013.

She dated television actor Karan Patel but they broke up in 2015.

Panjabi married her boyfriend, a Delhi-based doctor Shalabh Dang, on 10 February 2020. Shalabh had a son from his previous marriage, Ishaan. Kamya and Shalabh are now parents to both Aara and Ishaan.

== Politics ==
Punjabi joined the Congress party on 27 October 2021.

== Filmography ==
=== Films ===
| Year | Title | Role | Notes | Ref. |
|---|---|---|---|---|
| 2000 | Kaho Naa... Pyaar Hai | | Uncredited | |
| 2000 | Phir Bhi Dil Hai Hindustani | | | |
| 2001 | Yaadein | Pinky | | |
| 2002 | Na Tum Jaano Na Hum | | | |
| 2003 | Koi... Mil Gaya | | | |
| 2005 | Chand Bujh Gaya | Dancer | Special appearance | |
| 2025 | Me No Pause Me Play | Dolly | | |

=== Television ===
| Year | Title | Role | Notes |
|---|---|---|---|
| 2001 | Ssshhhh...Koi Hai | Nisha | |
| 2002 | Kehta Hai Dil | Karishma Singh | |
| 2002 | Kyun Hota Hai Pyarrr | Ramya | |
| 2002 | Piya Ka Ghar | Simran | |
| 2002–2003 | Kammal | Vidhisha | |
| 2003–2006 | Astitva...Ek Prem Kahani | Kiran | |
| 2004 | CID | Herself | |
| 2004–2006 | Reth | Netra | |
| 2005–2007 | Woh Rehne Waali Mehlon Ki | Kamya Parashar | |
| 2006–2009 | Banoo Main Teri Dulhann | Sindoora Pratap Singh | |
| 2007 | Amber Dhara | Deepika | |
| 2008 | Comedy Circus | Contestant | |
| 2009 | Jeet Jayenge Hum | Devyani | |
| 2009 | Naaginn - Waadon Ki Agniparikshaa | Naaginn | |
| 2010–2012 | Maryada: Lekin Kab Tak? | Uttara Jakhar | |
| 2012 | Parvarrish – Kuchh Khattee Kuchh Meethi | Mandira Bhagat | |
| 2013 | Do Dil Ek Jaan | Daya Mayi | |
| 2013 | Nautanki: The Comedy Theatre | Contestant | |
| 2013 | Bigg Boss 7 | Contestant (Evicted Day 91) | 8th place |
| 2014 | Beintehaa | Zareena Qureshi | |
| 2014 | F.I.R. | Bhanu Mitra | |
| 2014 | The Adventures of Hatim | Rehana | |
| 2014 | Bigg Boss 8 | Guest | |
| 2014–2015 | Box Cricket League 1 | Contestant | |
| 2015 | Doli Armaano Ki | Damini Sinha | |
| 2015 | Killerr Karaoke Atka Toh Latkah | Contestant | |
| 2015 | Aanat | Shweta | |
| 2015 | Bigg Boss 9 | Guest | |
| 2016 | Darr Sabko Lagta Hai | Vidya Parihar | Episode 22 |
| 2016 | Box Cricket League 2 | Contestant | |
| 2016 | Comedy Nights Bachao | Guest | |
| 2016–2021 | Shakti - Astitva Ke Ehsaas Ki | Preeto Kaur Singh | |
| 2016 | Bigg Boss 10 | Guest | |
| 2017 | Tu Aashqui | Guest | |
| 2018 | Bigg Boss 12 | Guest | |
| 2019 | Kitchen Champion | Guest | |
| 2019 | Bigg Boss 13 | Guest | |
| 2020 | Bigg Boss 14 | Guest | |
| 2021 | Bigg Boss 15 | Guest | |
| 2022 | Sanjog | Gauri | |
| 2023 | Raazz Mahal – Dakini Ka Rahasya | Mantealekha | |
| 2023 | Tere Ishq Mein Ghayal | Nandini | |
| 2023–2024 | Neerja – Ek Nayi Pehchaan | Didun | |
| 2024–2025 | Ishq Jabariya | Mohini Awasthi | |
| 2025 | Bigg Boss 18 | Guest | |
| 2026–present | Vasudha | Rudraani Singh Shekhawat | |

== Awards and nominations ==
| Year | Award | Category | Show | Role | Result | Ref. |
|---|---|---|---|---|---|---|
| 2007 | Indian Telly Awards | Best Actor in a Negative Role (Female) | Banoo Main Teri Dulhann | Sindoora Pratap Singh | Won | |
| 2008 | Apsara Awards | Best Actor in a Negative Role (Female) | Banoo Main Teri Dulhann | Sindoora Pratap Singh | Won | |
| 2012 | Indian Telly Awards | Best Actress in a Supporting Role (Jury) | Maryada: Lekin Kab Tak? | Uttara | Nominated | |
| 2017 | Zee Gold Awards | Best Actress in Negative Role (Critics) | Shakti – Astitva Ke Ehsaas Ki | Preeto Kaur Singh | Won | |
| 2022 | Zee Rishtey Awards | Best Maa Award | Sanjog | Gauri | Won | |

== See also ==
- List of Hindi television actresses
- List of Indian television actresses
