= Shukriya: Till Death Do Us Apart =

- DVD cover
- Directed by: Anupam Sinha
- Written by: Jeetu Arora; Anupam Sinha
- Produced by: Manoj Bhatnagar; Vibha Bhatnagar; Ragini Sona
- Starring: Anupam Kher; Aftab Shivdasani; Shriya Saran; Indraneil Sengupta
- Cinematography: Rajeev Shrivastav
- Music by: Vishal–Shekhar; Himesh Reshammiya; Devendra-Yogendra; Raju Rao
- Release date: 8 October 2004
- Country: India
- Language: Hindi

Shukriya: Till Death Do Us Apart (transl. Thank You: Til Death Do Us Apart) is a 2004 Indian Hindi-language romantic drama film directed by Anupam Sinha, starring Anupam Kher, Aftab Shivdasani, Shriya Saran and Indraneil Sengupta. The film is an adaptation of the 1998 American film Meet Joe Black.

== Plot ==
Thirty years ago, Karam Jindal with his widowed mom, Gayatri, and wife, Sandhya, immigrated to London, England. Shortly thereafter, Gayatri was diagnosed with cancer and died. Sandhya gives birth to two daughters, Anjali and Sanam. The Jindals accumulate wealth and are now one of the wealthiest families in London.

Anjali marries Akash, while Sanam is on the look-out for her beau. With Karam's 60th birthday coming up, Anjali is busy with preparations for a grand party. Karam hopes to get Sanam married to Yash, his employee, who is like a son to him. Adding to the celebration is the inauguration of the "Gayatri Jindal Cancer Hospital" on Karam's birthday.

With the preparations under way, Karam brings home a young man, Rohan "Ricky" Verma, to live with them for a few days. Sanam has already met him and is quite friendly with him. She confides in her mother that she would like to marry Rohan, and her mother implies that she approves of him. They are shocked when Karam vehemently opposes any alliance with Rohan and refuses to divulge the reason. Only Karam knows that Rohan is not who he claims to be – he is Death himself – and is accompanying Karam during his last four days on Earth.

== Cast ==
- Anupam Kher as Karam Jindal
- Shriya Saran as Sanam K. Jindal
- Aftab Shivdasani as Death / "Rohan Verma" / Ricky
- Indraneil Sengupta as Yash
- Rati Agnihotri as Sandhya K. Jindal
- Rana Jung Bahadur as Uday R. Jindal
- Anupam Sharma as Sameer

== Music ==
Shukriya: Till Death Do Us Apart

Soundtrack album by Himesh Reshammiya, Vishal-Shekhar, DEVENDRA-YOGENDRA, Raju Rao
- Released: 8 October 2004 (India)
- Recorded: 2004
- Venue: Mumbai
- Genre: Feature film soundtrack
- Length: 50:39
- Producer: Himesh Reshammiya

Himesh Reshammiya, Vishal-Shekhar, DEVENDRA-YOGENDRA, Raju Rao chronology
Dil Ne Jise Apna Kahaa (2004)	Shukriya: Till Death Do Us Apart (2004)	Aitraaz (2004)

The lyrics were written by Sameer.

=== Track list ===
#	Title	Music	Singer(s)
1.	"Tumhe Jitna Bhulate Hain"	Himesh Reshammiya	Sonu Nigam
2.	"Kya Haal Hai Mere Is Dil Ka"	Himesh Reshammiya	Udit Narayan, Alka Yagnik
3.	"Maine Poochha Kudrat Se"	Vishal-Shekhar	Kumar Sanu, Anuradha Paudwal
4.	"Aankhon Aankhon Mein"	Vishal-Shekhar	KK, Sunidhi Chauhan
5.	"Tumhara Tumhara"	Himesh Reshammiya	Udit Narayan, Alka Yagnik
6.	"Dil Ai Dil"	Vishal-Shekhar	Kumar Sanu
7.	"Leti Hai Yeh Zindagi"	DEVENDRA-YOGENDRA	Sonu Nigam
8.	"Ni Soniye"	DEVENDRA-YOGENDRA	Sonu Nigam, Udit Narayan, Alka Yagnik, Shreya Ghoshal
9.	"Shukriya (Theme Track)"	Raju Rao	Instrumental

== Reception ==
Kaveree Bamzai of India Today wrote, "What happens when a music video director makes a three-hour-long movie? You feel like calling cut. Shukriyais not original, which in this age of DVD clones is not a surprise." Taran Adarsh of IndiaFM gave the film two out of five, writing, "If the story of this film is its USP, it's also a deterrent. While some would love the novel theme, there might be a sizable section of moviegoers who may not absorb the unconventional storyline."
