= Goyenda Gogol =

- DVD release poster
- Directed by: Arindam Dey
- Based on: Sonali Parer Rahashya by Samaresh Basu
- Produced by: Supratik Ghosh
- Starring: See below
- Cinematography: Sirsha Ray
- Edited by: Bodhaditya Banerjee
- Music by: Shamik Sinha
- Production company: Ishani Films
- Distributed by: Ishani Films
- Release date: 24 May 2013 (Kolkata)
- Running time: 111 minutes
- Country: India
- Language: Bengali

Goyenda Gogol (or Goenda Gogol; English: Detective Gogol) is a 2013 Indian Bengali suspense film, directed by Arindam Dey and produced by Supratik Ghosh under the banner of Ishani Films. Based on the story Sonali Parer Rahashya by Samaresh Basu, the film features child actor Ahijit Ghosh and Indraneil Sengupta in the lead roles. It boasts of being the first film to feature a tattooed Bengali private detective (Indraneil Sengupta). Saheb Chatterjee and Rachana Banerjee also play parents for the first time in this film. The film was released on 24 May 2013.

== Plot ==
Gogol is a fictional child sleuth created by the famous Bengali writer Samaresh Basu. There are many stories of Gogol (Detective) included in Gogol Omnibus. A bespectacled kid, Gogol is a student of Class VI and happens to be a gadget freak. He carries the 'What Not Bag' which includes things like compass, magnifying glass, a tab and other things which prove useful when he goes to solve cases. He is also an expert in karate. Gogol likes to daydream and in his dreams, he kicks the hell out of everyone with his karate moves. Though the story, Sonali Parer Rahashya, was initially written in the 1970s, it has been modernized by the crew members to make it more contemporary and interesting to the younger generation.

In this story, Gogol sets out to Puri to spend his summer holidays with his mother and U.S. returned father and come across Mandar Villa, better known as Hanabari (haunted house), due to its deserted and haunted appearance. It attracts his attention from the very first day as he had heard about it before. Gogol learns that people disappear when they enter the house. The curious boy then seeks the reason. His curiosity drives him to it and he comes across Neil Senapati, a professor, tries his best to drive him away from it. Gogol finds there is more of it. Ultimately he is kidnapped by Neil at 'Hanabari' after an unsuccessful attempt, but he is later rescued by Ashok Thakur, a private detective who was also closely following the developments and was after Professor Neil Senapati, who turns out to be Amrit, a notorious drug smuggler, who had kidnapped Gogol as he suspected Gogol to be in possession of a rare diamond, a 'Shah diamond', one of three left in the world which had been passed on to Gogol's bag by one of Amrit's men without Gogol's knowledge.

== Cast ==
- Ahijit Ghosh as Gogol
- Indraneil Sengupta as Ashok Thakur
- Debdut Ghosh as Professor Neil Senapati alias Amrit
- Rachana Banerjee as Gogol's mother
- Saheb Chatterjee as Gogol's father
- Sumit Samaddar as Tamal Kundu
- Shamik Sinha as Kumud Patnaik, Amrit's man
- Ankita Majumder as Tamal's wife
- Mousumi Bhattacharya
- Payel
- Aryaa Dey

== Soundtrack ==
Goyenda Gogol

Soundtrack album to Goyenda Gogol by Shamik Sinha
- Released: 2013
- Genre: Feature film soundtrack
- Language: Bengali

The music of Goyenda Gogol has been composed by Shamik Sinha. There is only one title track sung by Silajit Majumder.

== Filming ==
The film was shot in several places of West Bengal and Orissa, including Kolkata, Tajpur, Puri and Udayagiri and Khandagiri Caves. Goyenda Gogol was shot for eight months and even the shooting was stalled many times. In an interview with The Telegraph, director Arindam Dey said, "Detective stories are the most difficult to shoot. Sonali Parer Rahashya is a three-page story, so I had to build on it. I incorporated a train sequence. I have also modernised Gogol, given him specs and a Tab. There are long chase sequences in the jungles. Plus, the haunted house around which Gogol's adventures take place had to be built on the Puri Beach. Puri has changed a lot since the time Samaresh Basu wrote the story. I couldn't find a single house which looked old and worn-out. We were supposed to shoot in Konark but couldn't because of the rains and then I didn't get the permission, so we had to shoot the Konark portions in Udayagiri."

== Critical reception ==
Professional ratings
Review scores
Source	Rating
Gomolo	3/5 stars
The Times of India	3/5 stars
In.com	3/5 stars
Anandabazar Patrika	2/5 stars

Goyenda Gogol received good reviews from critics. Newcomer child actor Ahijit Ghosh managed to get some positive remarks from most critics and reviewers. Gomolo rated it 3 out of 5 stars. Aditya Chakrabarty of Gomolo wrote— "The film is an excellent watch for kids this summer. Debutante child artiste Ahijit Ghosh is excellent as Gogol, who is always curious and his mind takes him here and there, yet he has a mind full of innocence though he is ahead of others of his age group in some aspects. The Times of India rated it 3 out of 5 stars and said, "While Indraneil as Ashoke lends credibility to his character – that of an undercover cop – with his personality and body language, Shaheb and Rachna do a good job as Gogol's (child artiste Ahijit) parents. The two kids, Ahijit and Payel, appear convincing for their age. The bad man, Debdoot as Professor Neel, is suitably dislikable and gives an impressive performance." Amina Khatoon of In.com rated the movie 3 out of 5 and said, "The young detective in specs. We would not be surprised if Ahijit Ghosh returns to the screen with other Gogol movies. His acting abilities would shame many 'stars' in the Bengali film industry and kudos to the director to get that out of him." She added that, "Puri has changed a lot over the decades and finding a haunted house on the Puri beach would not appear too convincing even to a kid today. The director could have changed the venue. Some of the scenes such as smugglers discussing their secret plans in the hotel lobby loud enough to be overheard by others is a not-so-good idea. Some of the special effects are too funny. Some more budget allocations towards those would have added a lot of value to the film."

== Sequel ==
A sequel named Gogoler Kirti, based on two stories (Royraja Uddhar and Mahishmardini Uddhar) of Samaresh Basu, released on 12 September 2014. Ahijit Ghosh reprised his role as Gogol. Pompi Ghosh Mukherjee Directed this film.
