= Bigg Boss (Hindi TV series) season 15 =

Indian reality show (2021)

Bigg Boss
- Season 15
- Presented by: Salman Khan
- No. of days: 120
- No. of housemates: 24
- Winner: Tejasswi Prakash
- Runner-up: Pratik Sehajpal
- No. of episodes: 121

Release
- Original network: Colors TV
- Original release: 2 October 2021 – 30 January 2022

Season chronology
- ← Previous; Season 14 Next → Season 16

Bigg Boss 15, also known as Bigg Boss: "Sankat in Jungle", was the fifteenth season of the Indian reality TV series Bigg Boss. It premiered on 2 October 2021 on Colors TV. Salman Khan hosted the season for the twelfth time. The grand finale aired on 30 January 2022 where Tejasswi Prakash emerged as the winner while Pratik Sehajpal as the runner-up. The season was regarded as one of the least successful seasons in the show's history.

== Production ==
=== Teaser ===
The first teaser was released on 22 August 2021, in which Salman Khan is a forest officer talking to a wishful talking tree named Vishwasuntree in which veteran actress Rekha gave her voice. On the grand finale of Bigg Boss OTT, another promo was released revealing the date of the premiere .

=== Eye logo ===
This theme of the season was "Sankat in Jungle". The eye this time was covered with green grass and shows a tree in the pupil of the eye with flames coming from the centre of the eye.

=== House ===
The house this time had a "Jungle Theme" and was located in Goregaon for the third time. The house was divided into 2 parts, Jungle House and Main House. On Day 21, Jungle House was closed.

=== Telecast ===
Apart from the usual hour-long episode, viewers also had access to the direct 24x7 camera footage. The viewers also had access to Before TV on Voot Select where the episode was telecast 30 minutes before it was telecasted on Colors TV. Also for the first time, Live Voting was conducted for the Eviction Process. On weekdays, the show was at 10.30 PM IST & weekend show was at 9.30 PM IST which was changed to 8 PM IST from Week 16.

=== Concept ===
All housemates will be given a survival kit with a few essentials throughout the season and will get fewer facilities this time. The housemates will enter a small jungle house which has a small kitchen, no beds and sofa and bathroom for the first 3 weeks. The housemates who will survive the jungle will enter the main luxurious house. There is a wishful tree in the garden area named Vishwasuntree who is the queen of the magical jungle in the house and will give advantages and privileges to the contestants who perform well in the jungle. On Day 36, Salman announced that there will be a new zone named VIP Zone. The members who are in VIP Zone are eligible to be in the finale.

=== Casting ===
On the grand finale of Bigg Boss OTT, finalist Pratik Sehajpal was officially revealed as the first confirmed contestant, which followed by Nishant Bhat and Shamita Shetty was announced as the other two contestants at the press conference held by Arti Singh and Devoleena Bhattacharjee.

== Housemates status ==
Sr	Housemate	Day entered	Day exited	Status
1	Tejasswi	Day 1	Day 120	Winner
2	Pratik	Day 1	Day 120	1st runner-up
3	Karan	Day 1	Day 120	2nd runner-up
4	Shamita	Day 1	Day 44	Walked
4	Shamita	Day 50	Day 120	3rd runner-up
5	Nishant	Day 1	Day 120	Walked, 4th runner-up
6	Rashami	Day 56	Day 120	5th runner-up
7	Rakhi	Day 56	Day 116	Evicted
8	Devoleena	Day 56	Day 113	Evicted
9	Abhijit	Day 57	Day 106	Evicted
10	Umar	Day 1	Day 98	Ejected
11	Rajiv	Day 21	Day 77	Evicted
11	Rajiv	Day 108	Day 114	Guest
12	Ritesh	Day 51	Day 77	Evicted
13	Neha	Day 33	Day 56	Evicted
14	Jay	Day 1	Day 56	Evicted
15	Vishal	Day 1	Day 56	Evicted
16	Simba	Day 1	Day 53	Evicted by Housemates
17	Afsana	Day 1	Day 40	Ejected
18	Raqesh	Day 33	Day 40	Walked
19	Ieshaan	Day 1	Day 35	Evicted
20	Miesha	Day 1	Day 35	Evicted
21	Akasa	Day 1	Day 28	Evicted
22	Donal	Day 1	Day 18	Evicted by Housemates
23	Vidhi	Day 1	Day 18	Evicted by Housemates
24	Sahil	Day 1	Day 14	Evicted

== Housemates ==
The participants in the order of appearance and entered in the house are:

=== Original entrants ===
- Jay Bhanushali – Actor and television presenter. He is known for playing Neev Shergill in Kayamath and participating in Nach Baliye 5.
- Vishal Kotian – Television actor. He is known for playing Birbal in Har Mushkil Ka Hal Akbar Birbal and Akbar Ka Bal Birbal.
- Tejasswi Prakash – Television actress. She is known for playing Ragini Maheshwari in Swaragini - Jodein Rishton Ke Sur, Diya Singh in Rishta Likhenge Hum Naya, Mishti in Silsila Badalte Rishton Ka and participating in Fear Factor: Khatron Ke Khiladi 10.
- Vidhi Pandya – Television actress. She is known for playing Imli Rajvanshi in Udaan and Suman Tiwari in Ek Duje Ke Vaaste 2.
- Simba Nagpal – Television actor and model. He is Known for playing Virat Singh in Shakti - Astitva Ke Ehsaas Ki and participating in MTV Roadies.
- Umar Riaz – Surgeon and model. He appeared in music videos such as "Befikar Raho" and "Sky High".
- Ieshaan Sehgal – Television actor. He is known for playing Avdhoot Pratap Singh in Rishton Ka Chakravyuh.
- Donal Bisht – Television actress and model. She is known for playing Sakshi in Kalash - Ek Vishwaas, Sharanya in Ek Deewaana Tha and Ishika in Roop - Mard Ka Naya Swaroop.
- Akasa Singh – Singer. She is well known for singing "Aithey Aa" from the 2019 film Bharat and "Naagin", a duet with Aastha Gill.
- Karan Kundrra – Television actor and model. He is known for playing Arjun Punj in Kitani Mohabbat Hai, Ritwik Noon in Dil Hi Toh Hai and Ranveer Chauhan in Yeh Rishta Kya Kehlata Hai.
- Afsana Khan – Punjabi playback singer, actress and songwriter. She is known for singing the hit track "Titliaan" and the song "Teri Akheeyan" from Qismat 2.
- Miesha Iyer – Reality television personality. She is known for participating in MTV Ace of Space 1 and MTV Splitsvilla 12.
- Sahil Shroff – Actor and model. He is known for acting in films Don 2: The King Is Back and Shaadi Ke Side Effects.

=== OTTians ===
- Pratik Sehajpal – Reality television star. He participated in reality shows like MTV Love School and Ace of Space 1. He was the 4th runner up of Bigg Boss OTT.
- Nishant Bhat – Choreographer. He was a part of dance reality shows like Super Dancer, Jhalak Dikhhla Jaa and Dance Deewane. He was the 1st runner up of Bigg Boss OTT.
- Shamita Shetty – Film actress. She is known for debut film Mohabbatein and second runner-up of Bigg Boss OTT.

=== Wildcard entrants ===
- Rajiv Adatia — Former model and entrepreneur.
- Ritesh Kumar — Businessman, software professional; Rakhi Sawant's husband.
- Abhijit Bichukale — Politician. He participated in Bigg Boss Marathi 2.

=== Challengers ===
- Raqesh Bapat — Television and film actor. Contestant of OTT Season 1.
- Neha Bhasin — Singer. Contestant of OTT Season 1.
- Devoleena Bhattacharjee — Actress and dancer. Contestant of Season 13 and Season 14.
- Rashami Desai — Television and film actress. Contestant of Bigg Boss 13.
- Rakhi Sawant — Actress and dancer. Contestant of Season 1 and Season 14.

== Twists ==
=== Housemates allotment ===
Housemate	Week 1	Week 2	Week 3						Week 4	Week 5	Week 6	Week 7	Week 8	Week 9	Week 10	Week 11	Week 12	Week 13	Week 14	Week 15	Week 16	Week 17
Housemate	Days 1–7	Days 8-12	Days 13-17	Day 18	Day 19	Day 20	Day 21	Day 22	Week 4	Week 5	Week 6	Week 7	Week 8	Week 9	Week 10	Week 11	Week 12	Week 13	Week 14	Week 15	Week 16	Week 17
Housemate	^{[1]}	N/A	^{[2]}	^{[3]}	^{[4]}		^{[5]}	N/A			^{[6]} ^{[7]}	^{[8]}	^{[9]}	^{[10]}		^{[11]}	N/A					^{[12]}
Karan	Jungle House↔				Main House↑			Jungle House Closed	Housemate↔		VIP↑	Housemate↓							VIP↑			
Pratik	Main House↔			Jungle House↓			Main House↑	Jungle House Closed	Housemate↔			VIP↑	Housemate↓								VIP↑	
Nishant	Main House↔			Jungle House↓		Main House↑		Jungle House Closed	Housemate↔		VIP↑		Housemate↓								VIP↑	
Rashami	Not in House							Jungle House Closed	Not in House					VIP↔		Housemate↓			VIP↑		Housemate↓	VIP↑
Shamita	Main House↔			Jungle House↓	Main House↑			Jungle House Closed	Housemate↔				Housemate↔						VIP↑			
Tejasswi	Jungle House↔		Main House↑	Jungle House↓	Main House↑			Jungle House Closed	Housemate↔		VIP↑	Housemate↓							VIP↑			
Rakhi								Jungle House Closed						VIP↔								
Devoleena								Jungle House Closed						VIP↔		Housemate↓			VIP↑		Housemate↓	
Abhijit								Jungle House Closed						VIP↔		Housemate↓						
Umar	Jungle House↔					Main House↑		Jungle House Closed	Housemate↔		VIP↑		Housemate↓						VIP↑			
Rajiv								Jungle House Closed	Housemate↔												Guest↔	
Ritesh								Jungle House Closed						VIP↔		Housemate↓						
Neha								Jungle House Closed			Housemate↔											
Jay	Jungle House↔		Main House↑	Jungle House↓			Main House↑	Jungle House Closed	Housemate↔													
Vishal	Jungle House↔		Main House↑	Jungle House↓	Main House↑			Jungle House Closed	Housemate↔		VIP↑		Housemate↓									
Simba	Jungle House↔						Main House↑	Jungle House Closed	Housemate↔			VIP↑	Housemate↓									
Afsana	Jungle House↔					Main House↑		Jungle House Closed	Housemate↔													
Raqesh	Not in House							Jungle House Closed	Not in House		Housemate↔											
Miesha	Jungle House↔						Main House↑	Jungle House Closed	Housemate↔													
Ieshaan	Jungle House↔						Main House↑	Jungle House Closed	Housemate↔													
Akasa	Jungle House↔		Main House↑	Jungle House↓			Main House↑	Jungle House Closed	Housemate↔													
Donal	Jungle House↔																					
Vidhi	Jungle House↔																					
Sahil	Jungle House↔																					

1. The finalist of Bigg Boss OTT get direct access to Main House.
2. By winning 'Zeher Ka Keher' Task, Team Tiger Jay, Vishal, Tejasswi and Akasa were upgraded to the Main house.
3. Due to violation of the rules, All Main House members were downgraded to the Jungle House.
4. By winning 'The Currency' Task, Karan & Tejasswi, Shamita & Vishal, Umar & Afsana and Sanchalak Nishant were upgraded to Main House.
5. The last five jungle housemates had to come to a mutual decision of leaving the show or giving up the remaining 25 lakh prize money to stay and get access to Main House, They choose the latter and BB Magical Jungle started disappearing with all housemates in the Main House.
6. House Captain Umar get to choose 3 more VIP contestants.
7. By winning the 'BB Mine' Task, Vishal is now VIP Contestant.
8. By winning the 'Scary Monster' Task, Nishant had got a special power that he could upgrade 2 Common Members to VIPs and downgrade 2 VIPs to Common Members, He upgraded Simba and Pratik and downgraded Tejasswi and Karan.
9. Due to violation of rules Bigg Boss announced that VIP Zone will be temporarily closed and all became Common Housemates.
10. The challengers entered as VIPs.
11. Rakhi wins the 'Ticket to Finale' Task and becomes the sole VIP housemate with others downgraded.
12. By surviving via public vote Rashmi won 'Ticket To Finale'.

== Guest appearances ==
Week(s)	Day(s)	Guest(s)	Notes
Premiere Night	Day 0	Asim Riaz	To support his brother Umar
Premiere Night	Day 0	Ranveer Singh	To promote The Big Picture
Week 1	Day 1	Mouni Roy	For special task
Week 1	Day 8	Rakhi Sawant	For interaction with housemates
Week 1	Day 8	Rahul Vaidya, Nia Sharma, Aastha Gill, Meet Bros, Bhoomi Trivedi, Khushboo Grewal and Dhvani Bhanushali	Navratri celebration
Week 1	Day 8	Arjun Bijlani, Karan Patel, Nikki Tamboli and Neha Bhasin	As special panelists
Week 1	Day 8	Yohani	Special appearance
Week 2	Day 15	Farah Khan	To interact with housemates
Week 2	Day 15	Bhuvan Bam	To promote Dhindora
Week 2	Day 15	Bappi Lahiri and Swastik Bansal	Celebrating Bappi Lahiri's 50 years in the industry
Week 3	Day 22	Manish Paul	For fun task
Week 3	Day 22	Hina Khan	For fun task
Week 4	Day 29	Rohit Shetty and Katrina Kaif	To promote Sooryavanshi
Week 4	Day 29	Badshah	For fun task
Week 5	Day 30	Rashami Desai, Devoleena Bhattacharjee, Gautam Gulati, Kamya Punjabi	For nominations
Week 5	Day 34	Ranveer Singh and Aayush Sharma	For help from Housemates in The Big Picture
Week 5	Day 37	Bhagyashree, Abhimanyu Dassani and Sanya Malhotra	To promote Meenakshi Sundareshwar
Week 5	Day 37	Ekta Kapoor, Surbhi Chandna and Anita Hassanandani	Announcement of Naagin 6 and for fun task
Week 6	Day 43	Rani Mukherji, Siddhant Chaturvedi, Sharvari Wagh	To promote Bunty Aur Babli 2
Week 6	Day 43	Kartik Aaryan	To promote Dhamaka
Week 7	Day 50	John Abraham and Divya Khosla Kumar	To promote Satyameva Jayate 2
Week 7	Day 50	Aayush Sharma and Mahima Makwana	To promote Antim: The Final Truth
Week 7	Day 50	Bharti Singh, Haarsh Limbachiyaa and Mubeen Saudagar	To promote the game show
Week 7	Day 50	Mahesh Manjrekar	To interact with housemates and new wild cards
Week 8	Day 55	Bharti Singh and Haarsh Limbachiyaa	For fun task and eviction process
Week 8	Day 57	Ravi Dubey and Ravi Kishan	For the celebration of the success of Matsya Kaand
Week 8	Day 57	Vivian Dsena and Eisha Singh	To promote Sirf Tum
Week 8	Day 57	Suniel Shetty, Ahan Shetty, Tara Sutaria and Sajid Nadiadwala	To promote Tadap
Week 8	Day 57	Neha Dhupia	To interact with housemates and judge
Week 9	Day 64	Raftaar and Surbhi Jyoti	To celebrate success of Ghana Kasoota song
Week 9	Day 64	Raveena Tandon	To promote Aranyak
Week 9	Day 64	Sara Ali Khan	To promote Atrangi Re
Week 10	Day 72	Farah Khan	To host the show
Week 10	Day 72	Ayushmann Khurrana and Vaani Kapoor	To promote Chandigarh Kare Aashiqui
Week 11	Day 78	Remo D'Souza	To promote Moj
Week 11	Day 78	Govinda	To promote his YouTube channel Govinda Royalles
Week 11	Day 78	Kanika Kapoor and Sunny Leone	To promote Madhuban
Week 12	Day 85	Shahid Kapoor and Mrunal Thakur	To promote Jersey
Week 12	Day 85	S.S. Rajamouli, Ram Charan, Jr. NTR and Alia Bhatt	To promote RRR
Week 12	Day 85	Guru Randhawa and Nora Fatehi	To promote Dance Meri Rani song
Week 13	Day 91	Anu Malik	To entertain housemates
Week 13	Day 91	Dharmendra	To interact with housemates
Week 13	Day 91	Sheykhar Ravjiani	To promote Sheykhar - Rang song
Week 13	Day 91	Siddharth Nigam, Jannat Zubair and Ishaan Khan	To promote Wallah Wallah song
Week 13	Day 91	Palak Tiwari	To promote Bijlee Bijlee song
Week 13	Day 91	Waluscha De Sousa	To promote Bollywood Wala Dance
Week 13	Day 91	Bharti Singh and Haarsh Limbachiyaa	For fun task
Week 13	Day 91	Shilpa Shetty	To interact with housemates
Week 14	Day 93 & 94	Munmun Dutta, Akanksha Puri, Surbhi Chandna and Vishal Singh	To perform task
Week 14	Day 99	Arbaaz Khan	To challenge housemates
Week 14	Day 99	Nia Sharma	To promote "Phoonk Le"
Week 14	Day 99	Vishal Singh, Neha Bhasin, Rahul Mahajan, Divya Agarwal, Kashmera Shah, Debina Bonnerjee & Geeta Kapoor	To Support their favourite housemates
Week 15	Week 106	Kings United	For dance performance
Week 15	Week 106	Gauahar Khan	To unveil Bigg Boss 15 Trophy
Week 15	Week 106	Janardhan Baba	To predict the future of housemates
Week 15	Week 106	Joyeeta Mitra Suvarna, Amith Tyagi & Dibang	As expert panellists
Week 16	Day 113	Mithun Chakraborty, Bharti Singh & Haarsh Limbachiyaa	To promote "Hunarbaaz: Desh Ki Shaan"
Week 16	Day 113	Iulia Vantur & Pragya Jaiswal	To promote "Main Chala"
Week 16	Day 113	Mika Singh	To promote "Majnu"
Week 17	Day 115	RJ Karan and RJ Palak	To interview housemates
Week 17	Day 118	Bharti Singh, Haarsh Limbachiyaa, Siddhartha Dey	To interact with housemates
Grand Finale	Day 120	Deepika Padukone, Siddhant Chaturvedi, Ananya Panday, Dhairya Karwa	To promote Gehraiyaan
Grand Finale	Day 120	Rubina Dilaik, Gautam Gulati, Gauahar Khan, Urvashi Dholakia, Shweta Tiwari	To offer ₹10 lakhs cash to the finalists
Grand Finale	Day 120	Shehnaaz Kaur Gill	To pay tribute to Sidharth Shukla
Grand Finale	Day 120	Reem Shaikh, Zain Imam and Akshit Sukhija	To promote Fanaa: Ishq Mein Marjawaan
Grand Finale	Day 120	Adaa Khan	To promote Naagin 6 and reveal the main actress

== Weekly summary ==
The main events in the house are summarised in the table below. A typical week begins with nominations, followed by the luxury budget task, punishment than a task for immunity or anything else and then the eviction of a housemate during the Sunday or Saturday episode called as "Weekend Ka Vaar". Evictions, tasks, and other notable events for a particular week are noted in order of sequence.

Week 1	Entrances	On Premiere Night, Jay, Vishal, Tejasswi, Vidhi, Umar, Ieshaan, Donal, Akasa, Karan, Afsana, Miesha Sahil, Simba entered the Jungle House.; On Day 1, Pratik, Shamita and Nishant entered the main house.
Week 1	Twist	On Day 1, Bigg Boss announced that the members of the main house would have special powers and they would all be protected from nominations. The contenders for the captaincy will be from the main house. The rest of the contestants have to live in a jungle house with only a kitchen and have to win tasks to reach the main house.
Week 1	Nominations	On Premiere Night, Ieshaan was nominated in a mutual decision between Donal and Ieshaan.; On Day 3, All the contestants who live in the Bigg Boss jungle were nominated.
Week 1	Tasks	Entrance Task: On Day 3, the housemates of the jungle were given the task of entering the main house, for which they had to place the puzzle piece on the map to complete the path from the main gate to the glass door to gain entry into the main house.; Captaincy Task: On Day 7, in the garden area there were 2 chickens of each captaincy contender. At the sound of the wolf, the people of the jungle will take 1 chicken of a person and feed it to the wolf. The contender who has the most chickens left at the end of the task will be the captain of the house.
Week 1	Results	Entrance Task was cancelled by Bigg Boss on Day 20
Week 1	Results	Winner (Captaincy Task) – Shamita
Week 1	Results	Failed (Captaincy Task) – Nishant, Pratik
Week 1	Punishments	On Day 3, All Jungle Housemates were nominated as a result of Pratik damaging the house property.
Week 1	Exits	On Day 8, Sahil Shroff was evicted by public vote.
Week 2	Nominations	Main House members are safe. All the jungle housemates will stand near their names boards. Bigg Boss will call 2 jungle housemates and will have to mutually decide who will be nominated.; Miesha & Ieshaan: Afsana; Karan & Tejasswi: Donal; Jay & Umar: Akasa; Vidhi & Vishal: Ieshaan; Afsana & Simba: Vishal; Akasa & Donal: Vidhi
Week 2	Tasks	Daaku Ka Kabza: Jungle inmates are living a difficult life while 3 OTT members have all amenities. One of the main amenities is the mattress. If Jungle inmates want to become housemates then they have to get puzzle pieces and make a pathway to the house. Today's task name is ‘Daaku Ka Kabza’. The housemates will be against jungle inmates in this task. If the jungle inmates win this task then they will have 30 more puzzle pieces but if housemates win this task then jungle inmates will have to give their existing puzzle pieces. In this task, Vishal will lead the gang that has overtaken the house. Tejasswi will be Vishal's wife as a thief, she will take care of Vishal. Jay and Karan will be right and left-hand men of Vishal as chiefs. They will guide Vishal. Akasa, Miesha, Afsana, and Donal will be cook for the gang. They will keep stirring the food. Simba, Ishaan, Umar and Vidhi will be guards of the game. She reads that Shamita, Pratik and Nishant will have to kill the gang members. They will kill from level up, first guards then cook then chiefs and then Vishal. Bigg Boss says only Shamita, Pratik and Nishant will know the ways to kill the jungle inmates. Shamita reads to Pratik and Nishant that if they want to kill the jungle inmate then they have some options. They can kill by: taking their photo; take their trimmer; take their luggage bag; dip their shoe in the paint; take their photo when they are angry and show it to Bigg Boss; paste ‘killed’ sticker on their back.; Zeher Ka Kehar:The tsk will be among jungle housemates. They will be divided into 3 teams; Team Tiger: Jay, Tejasswi, Vishal and Akasa; Team Deer: Ieshaan, Donal, Afsana and Simba; Team Plant: Karan, Miesha, Vidhi and Umar; In the first round, the teams will take canes from Shamita and use the machine to take out the juice. Only Shamita will decide which team will get how many canes. The team will have to protect their juice from the other team. After the round ends, Shamita will decide which team has the most juice. In the next round, the winner of the first round will take the juice to Pratik and Nishant's lab and get poison from them. They can use that poison to kill other inmates. It's a jungle so tigers can only kill deer. Deers can only kill plants. Plants can only kill tigers. If one team is killed completely then the remaining two teams can kill each other. At the end of the task, the team with the most alive members will win the task and have the chance to be upgraded to main house members and can enter the main house. Shamita will be the referee of the task.
Week 2	House Captain	Shamita Shetty
Week 2	Notes	After winning Zeher Ka Kehar task; Jay, Vishal, Tejasswi and Akasa were upgraded to Main House Members and entered the main house and got luxury items.
Week 2	Results	Winner (Daaku Ka Kabza) – All jungle housemates
Week 2	Results	Failed (Daaku Ka Kabza) – Nishant, Pratik, Tejasswi
Week 2	Results	Winner (Zeher Ka Kehar) –Team Tiger (Jay, Akasa, Simba, Vishal)
Week 2	Results	Failed (Zeher Ka Kehar) - Team Deer (Karan, Miesha, Umar, Vidhi), Team Plant(Ieshaan, Afsana, Donal )
Week 2	Exits	On Day 15, No Eviction took place
Week 3	Nominations	On Day 18, Bigg Boss asked all the 15 housemates to name 2 housemates mutually in which their contribution to the show was zero. The 2 housemates will be directly evicted.; Right after the eviction, 2nd Nominations Process started in which Captain Nishant has to nominate 8 junglemates for violating the rules. As a result, Karan, Vishal, Miesha, Ieshaan, Umar, Shamita, Afsana and Simba were nominated by captain but all 8 nominated members have a chance to get safe from nomination. Any 4 members mutually can go to the Room of Illusion and They have 2 options.; Option 1: To be nominated.; Option 2: To nominate any other contestant and save themselves; Round / Inmate / Options / Nominations; Round 1 / Shamita / Option 1 / Shamita; Round 2 / Karan / Option 1 / Karan; Round 3 / Afsana / Option 2 / Vishal; Round 4 / Cancelled; Finally, The nominated contestants were Shamita, Karan, Vishal, Ieshaan, Simba, Umar and Miesha
Week 3	Twist	On Day 20, Bigg Boss ordered all the Jungle Housemates to return the path pieces.; On Day 21, Vishwasuntree announced that The jungle will be closed and gave 2 options to all the Jungle Housemates i.e., Miesha, Ieshaan, Jay, Pratik, Akasa and Simba; Option 1:If they use the rest of the 25 lakh rupees and enter the main house.; Option 2:If they do not use the rest of the 25 lakh rupees, they will have to leave the house.; All of them chose the 1st option and the prize money became zero and all Jungle Housemates became Main House Members and The Jungle House was officially closed.
Week 3	Task	Captaincy's Race: This task will be between 3 contenders that is Jay, Pratik and Nishant but the jungle inmates will play an important role. The contenders will have to make a buggy carriage. They have to convince the jungle inmates to make a carriage for them and keep it running on the treadmill. At the end of the task, whoever has run the treadmill the most will win the task. Tejasswi will be the referee of the task and decisions will be final. The jungle inmates will use 7 parts to make a carriage, once Tejasswi approves it then the inmates will start running on the treadmill. Nishant, Pratik and Jay can't take part in the task. They have to convince the jungle inmates to work for them. Shamita, Akasa and Vishal won't help any contender in the task. The jungle inmates have a chance to choose their support.; Ticket To Mukhya Ghar:- This task will be between all jungle housemates, They are divided into 6 pairs, Ieshaan & Miesha, Karan & Tejasswi, Jay & Pratik, Shamita & Vishal, Simba & Akasa and Afsana & Umar. Captain Nishant will be the task supervisor. In the task, Bigg Boss will announce the cost of the access card at the beginning of each round. At the sound of the alarm, Bigg Boss will send materials to make BB points. All pairs will run to get the material so they can make their points. The material will be sent through a tunnel. Nishant will decide which pair will get what time to make their points. Nishant will approve their points. All pairs have to protect their BB points. After the round ends, Nishant will accept or reject the BB points. After every round, Nishant will announce the winning pair who will be able to earn the access card, enter the house and then they won't play the next round.; Round / Cost of the Ticket / Winner; Round 1 / 5 Lakh Rupees / No Winner; Round 2 / 7 Lakh Rupees / Karan & Tejasswi; Round 3 / 8 Lakh Rupees / Simba & Vishal & a & Vishal; Round 4 / 10 Lakh Rupees / Umar & Afsana
Week 3	Punishments	As a result of violating the rules, All the main house members including the Captain were downgraded to Jungle Housemates and The Main House was sealed.; As Ieshaan, Akasa, Umar and Miesha couldn't decide on sending a contestant to the Room of Illusion, Bigg Boss nominated them for that week
Week 3	House Captain	Nishant Bhat
Week 3	Notes	As a result of winning the Ticket To Mukhya Ghar; Karan, Tejasswi, Shamita, Vishal, Umar and Afsana entered the Main House by spending 25 lakhs rupees. All the 6 main house members had to mutually decide whether Nishant should come inside the Main House or not. All members allowed him and Nishant also became the Main House Member.; On Day 20, Jungle House Kitchen's gas supply was closed and was replaced by an Induction top
Week 3	Results	Winner (Captaincy's Race) – Nishant
Week 3	Results	Failed (Captaincy's Race) – Jay, Pratik
Week 3	Results	Winner (Ticket To Mukhya Ghar) – Karan, Tejasswi, Simba, Vishal, Umar and Afsana
Week 3	Results	Failed (Ticket To Mukhya Ghar) – Rest of the contestants
Week 3	Exits	On Day 18, Bigg Boss asked all the 15 housemates to evict 2 housemates mutually in which their contribution to the show was zero. As a result, Donal Bisht and Vidhi Pandya were evicted.; On Day 22, No eviction took place
Week 4	Entrances	On Day 24, Rajiv Adatia entered the house as the 1st Wild Card Contestant.
Week 4	Nominations	On Day 23, Bigg Boss asked the contestants to choose two candidates who they want to put in nominations. As a result, Vishal, Akasa and Simba were nominated
Week 4	Task	Torture Task:Team A will have Tejasswi, Pratik, Nishant, Miesha, Rajiv and Simba. Team B will have Vishal, Jay, Afsana, Akasa, Umar and Ishaan. Team B will stand in the big alphabets in the garden area and team A will try to make them come out of the alphabets. They will send 2 players at a time. Team A will try to make them lose their positions. Team B will take their places in the alphabet and if they leave the alphabet then you are out of the task. It's on them till when they want to stay in the alphabet. Karan and Urfi will be referees of the task but they can't make their own rules.
Week 4	Results	Task was cancelled by Bigg Boss as the result was drawn and there would be no captain
Week 4	Exits	On Day 29, Akasa Singh was evicted by Public Vote
Week 5	Entrances	On Day 35, Neha Bhasin and Raqesh Bapat entered as Wild Cards
Week 5	Nominations	On Day 31, Some celebrities came to save 4 contestants: Rashami Desai saved Vishal; Gautam Gulati saved Tejasswi; Devoleena Bhattacharjee saved Jay; Kamya Punjabi saved Karan; On Day 32, Karan, Tejasswi, Jay and Vishal were asked to nominate one contestant. They nominated Miesha; The remaining inmates will play a task. Simba will choose one safe inmate to play for his as he has a finger injury. Miesha is nominated so she won't be part of it. In the task, there is a coconut tree, when the buzzer plays then the inmates have to collect coconuts in their baskets, the coconuts will be thrown from the tree by the safe inmates. They have to protect their baskets. When the round ends, then the referee will announce who has the most number of coconuts. The winner of that round will nominate someone else. Simba chooses Vishal as his proxy; Round / Winner / Nominations; Round 1 / Afsana / Simba; Round 2 / Simba / Umar; Round 3 / Afsana / Nishant; Round 4 / Pratik / Ieshaan; In the end, Miesha, Simba, Umar, Nishant and Ieshaan were nominated
Week 5	Tasks	House Matters:There will be a family. The family's head is Jay and his wife is Afsana. Jay-Afsana is an irritating uncle-aunt of the house, their kids are Rajiv and Miesha. Miesha is married and Vishal is her husband who lives with Miesha's parents. Rajiv's friend is Ishaan who lives with him. Jay's brother's sons are Nishant and Karan. They are Jay's nephews. Nishant's wife will be Tejasswi and Pratik will be their adopted child. Karan's wife is Shamita and their kids are Simba-Umar. Nishant and Karan's family don't like each other. In the task, each person knows a secret about another person. When the buzzer plays, a person will go to the recording room and tell the secret of another member which they want to eliminate from the task. The 2 members who are left in the end and their secrets are safe will win the task. At the end of each round, the secrets will be exposed and the gift hampers will be given to them.; Captaincy Task:. There are Diwali gifts from their families but they have to play a task to get them. This will be a captaincy task between Umar and Miesha. There is a happiness station in the garden which has all the gifts. Bigg Boss will announce the name and then that person can take the gift using fuel. Miesha and Umar will be gas stations so the inmate will have to convince them to give them fuel so they can sit in the car and reach their gifts. It depends on Miesha and Umar to give them fuel or not. Whoever has more fuel, in the end, will become the captain.
Week 5	Results	Winner (House Matters) – Umar, Miesha
Week 5	Results	Failed (House Matters) – Rest of the contestants
Week 5	Results	Winner (Captaincy Task) – Umar
Week 5	Results	Failed (Captaincy Task) – Miesha
Week 5	Exits	On Day 37, Miesha Iyer and Ieshaan Sehgaal were evicted by Public Vote
Week 6	Twist	On Day 37, Salman announced that there will be a new zone named VIP Zone. The VIP Members will be eligible for the trophy and can discuss nominations and have special privileges. The VIP Inmates are safe from nominations. The contenders for the captaincy will be from the VIP Zone.
Week 6	Nominations	Rest of the Non VIP Inmates, Neha, Rajiv, Afsana, Jay, Pratik, Simba were nominated.
Week 6	Task	Ticket to VIP Zone: Umar and 3 other inmates will become VIP members. Simba is punished so he won't be part of the task. All inmates will be tied to Umar, till they are tied to him, they can become VIPs. When the gong plays, Umar will let go of 2 inmates and eliminate them from the task. The inmates can eliminate themselves also. 3 Inmates tied to Umar till the end will become VIPs. Umar will be tied to the inmates using ropes and carabiners; BB Mine: They can win the VIP zone membership through this task. In the task, the weather of the house will change 6 times. All inmates except VIPs will be miners in the task. In the gold mine, the inmates will try to collect gold as much as they can. VIPs will be shopkeepers who will sell clothes against the gold. When the weather changes, the miners will buy clothes and enter the campsite. The one entering the campsite last will lose that round. Simba won't play for himself as he is punished but he will play on Shamita's behalf as she is injured. The miners will purchase the clothes as per the weather requirement.; Luxury Budget Task:Non VIP Inmates can earn ration. In the task, they will hunt eggs in the garden. There are 6 eggs hidden in the garden, they have to find them in 2 minutes. 3 inmates will win the task and get luxury items. VIP members won't be part of the task. Karan will be the referee of the task.
Week 6	Results	Winner (Ticket to VIP Zone) – Karan, Tejasswi and Nishant
Week 6	Results	Failed (Ticket to VIP Zone) – Rest of the contestants
Week 6	Results	Winner (BB Mine) – Vishal
Week 6	Results	Failed (BB Mine) – Pratik, Jay, Urfi, Rajiv, Neha, Simba, Afsana
Week 6	Results	Winner (Luxury Budget Task) – Rajiv Simba, Jay
Week 6	Results	Failed (Luxury Budget Task) – Pratik, Neha, Afsana
Week 6	Punishments	Simba was not allowed to take part in the VIP Zone Race for the week as a result of pushing Umar.; Bigg Boss took away the ration due to violation of rules.
Week 6	House Captain	Umar Riaz
Week 6	Notes	Since Umar was the Captain, He was upgraded to VIP Zone
Week 6	Exits	On Day 40, Raqesh Bapat left the house due to poor health conditions. Later On Day 43, Salman announced that Raqesh will not be coming back to the show; On Day 40, Afsana Khan was ejected due to harming herself with a knife.
Week 7	Nominations	Jay, Karan, Neha, Rajiv and Tejasswi were nominated
Week 7	Twists	On Day 50, Salman announced that out of the present 11, Only 5 will go-ahead
Week 7	Tasks	Scary Monster: One VIP member can earn power. The task is a ‘scary monster’, all VIPs will play against each other in the task .that there are 5 boxes allotted to each VIP. They have to fill their boxes with items. There is a monster who will sit on the chair. Pratik, Neha, Simba and Jay will be the monster of this task. They will select two VIPs with the lowest weights and then the monster will eliminate one of them after giving a reason. Rajiv won't part of the task. there will be 4 rounds, after every round, the one with the least items in their box will be out of the tasks. The housemates will check their boxes and announce the winner. The VIP who remains in the task till the end will win it.
Week 7	Results	Winner (Scary Monster) – Nishant
Week 7	Results	Failed (Scary Monster) – Rest of the VIPs
Week 7	Notes	Nishant had got a special power that he could upgrade 2 Common Members to VIPs and downgrade 2 VIPs to Common Members, He upgraded Simba and Pratik and downgraded Tejasswi and Karan.
Week 7	Jail	On Day 45, VIPs had to decide to send one Non-VIPs to Jail, They chose Rajiv and He was sent to Jail
Week 7	Exits	On Day 44, Shamita Shetty left the house due to health issues; On Day 50, There was no eviction
Week 8	Entrances	On Day 50, Shamita Shetty re-entered the House; On Day 56, Rashami Desai, Rakhi Sawant, Shamita Shetty and Ritesh Kumar entered the House as Wild Cards and became VIP Members
Week 8	Twist	On Day 51, Bigg Boss announced That VIP Zone will be closed and All became Common Members.
Week 8	Nominations	On Day 55, Voot Select Viewers had to save one of their bottom 5 during the Live Task
Week 8	Notes	On Press Conference, The Media chose Jay, Simba, Rajiv, Neha, Vishal and Umar as Bottom 6
Week 8	Exits	On Day 53, Vishal Koitan was evicted; Simba Nagpal was evicted by Top 5 Housemates; On Day 55, Jay Bhanushali, Neha Bhasin and were evicted by Public Vote
Week 9	Entrances	On Day 58, Abhijit Bichukale entered the House as a Wild Card and 5th VIP Member
Week 9	Nominations	Karan, Nishant, Pratik, Tejasswi, Shamita, Umar and Rajiv were nominated.
Week 9	Twists	The VIPs will have the entire prize money i.e.; 50 Lakhs and Non VIPs will have to win tasks to get their prize money and store it in the BB Vault
Week 9	Tasks	BB Games: There are 2 teams, VIPs vs. housemates will play the task. Devoleena will be the captain of her team and Shamita will be the captain of her team. They will be referees and won't take part in the tasks. They will get games from time to time. The winners will earn money in each game, at the end of the task, the winning amount will be transferred to the housemates’ briefcase. The housemates will try to win as many games as they can while VIPs will try to make them lose. The games will start with the announcement. When the buzzer plays, a new game will start. At the end of each game, the captains will announce the winners. They will write their winning amount on the board also.; Game 1: The winning amount is 5 lacs. One member from each team will be in the swimming pool. There are coins in the swimming pool, they have to collect them and give them to their team member. The other team member will put their coins in the boxes that are beside the pool, they can't remove the boxes from there. They have to protect their boxes. Shamita and Devoleena will follow these rules only. Bigg Boss asks them to announce who will take part in this game. Devoleena announces that Rashami will go in the pool and Ritesh will be by the pool. Shamita announces that Tejasswi will go in the pool and Umar will be by the pool from their side.; Game 2: The winning prize is 10 lacs. There will be two inmates from each other, one will be a horse and the other will sit on his back and play polo. Karan-Tejasswi, Rakhi-Ritesh will play the game. They have to play with a ball and make sure to have more goals. Shamita and Devoleena are referees. Rakhi and Tejasswi will try to the goal while sitting on their partner's backs.; Immunity Task: Non-VIP members have a chance to get saved from the nominations. The spider is the VIPs’ friend and each leg of it has a winning prize in it. The non-VIP members have to use clay to make their knives and then break the spider's leg. There will be 3 rounds, in each round, VIPs will give clay to non-VIP members. Then non-VIP members will make their knives and protect them also. The one who makes the full knife will earn immunity and then cut a spider's leg and earn the prize money. But that non-VIP member will have to do 2 sacrifices from the VIPs before cutting the leg. If he or she can't fulfil the sacrifices then they will earn immunity but not the prize amount
Week 9	Results	Task was cancelled by Bigg Boss as the result was draw and The prize money was reduced to 45 Lakhs
Week 9	Results	Winner (Immunity Task) – Simbaand Nishant
Week 9	Results	Failed (Immunity Task) – Rest of the Non VIPs
Week 9	Punishments	BB Vault was closed due to Non VIPs breaking the rules
Week 9	Notes	Simba and Nishant won the task and earned 3 Lakhs
Week 9	Exits	No Eviction
Week 10	Twist	
Week 10	Nominations	Ritesh & Karan were nominated by housemates
Week 10	Ticket To Finale Task	
Week 10	Luxury Budget Task	
Week 10	Punishments	
Week 10	House Captain	
Week 10	Notes	
Week 10	Exits	Ritesh Kumar was evicted by public votes
Week 11	Exits	On Day 78, Rajiv Adatia was evicted by public votes.
Week 12	Exits	No Eviction
Week 13	Twist	
Week 13	Nominations	
Week 13	Captaincy Task	
Week 13	Luxury Budget Task	
Week 13	Punishments	
Week 13	House Captain	
Week 13	Notes	
Week 13	Exits	No Eviction
Week 14	Twist	
Week 14	Nominations	Housemates nominated Karan, Tejasswi, Abhijit & Simba. Umar got nominated by Bigg Boss
Week 14	Captaincy Task	
Week 14	Luxury Budget Task	
Week 14	Punishments	
Week 14	House Captain	
Week 14	Notes	
Week 14	Exits	On Day 99, Umar Riaz was ejected from the house due to physical violence with Pratik Sehajpal
Week 15	Twist	
Week 15	Nominations	Rashami & Abhijit were nominated by housemates.
Week 15	Captaincy Task	
Week 15	Luxury Budget Task	
Week 15	Punishments	
Week 15	House Captain	Shamita Shetty
Week 15	Notes	
Week 15	Exits	No eviction took place.
Week 16	Entrances	On Day 108, Rajiv Adatia entered the house as a guest.
Week 16	Twist	
Week 16	Nominations	Rajiv nominated Devoleena and Rashami.
Week 16	Captaincy Task	
Week 16	Luxury Budget Task	
Week 16	Punishments	
Week 16	House Captain	Shamita Shetty
Week 16	Notes	
Week 16	Exits	On Day 114, Abhijit Bichukale and Devoleena were evicted by Public Vote.
Week 17	Nominations	
Week 17	Task	
Week 17	Happenings	
Week 17	Exits	On Day 116, Rakhi Sawant was evicted by Public Vote.
Grand Finale Day 120
5th Runner Up		Rashami Desai
4th Runner Up		Nishant Bhat
3rd Runner Up		Shamita Shetty
2nd Runner Up		Karan Kundrra
1st Runner Up		Pratik Sehajpal
Winner		Tejasswi Prakash

== Nomination table ==
	Week 1	Week 2	Week 3		Week 4	Week 5	Week 6	Week 7	Week 8		Week 9	Week 10	Week 11	Week 12	Week 13			Week 14	Week 15		Week 16	Week 17				
	Week 1	Week 2	Day 18	Day 19	Week 4	Week 5	Week 6	Week 7	Day 53	Day 54	Week 9	Week 10	Week 11	Week 12	Day 87	Day 89	Day 90	Week 14	Day 101	Day 104	Week 16	Day 114	Day 117	Day 120		
Nominated for Captaincy	No; Captain	Nishant; Pratik; Shamita	Jay; Nishant; Pratik		No; Captain		Miesha; Umar	No; Captain												Karan; Rakhi; Shamita; Tejasswi		No; Captain				
House; Captain	No; Captain	Shamita	Nishant		No; Captain		Umar	No; Captain												Shamita		No; Captain				
Captain's Nominations	No; Captain	Not eligible	Donal; Vidhi	Ieshaan; Miesha; Umar; Simba; Afsana; Shamita; Karan; Vishal	No; Captain		Not eligible	No; Captain												Tejasswi (to evict)	Not eligible	No; Captain				
VIP Members	No; VIP Members						Karan; Nishant; Tejasswi; Vishal; Umar	Nishant; Pratik; Simba	No; VIP Members		Abhijit; Devoleena; Rakhi; Rashami; Ritesh		Rakhi					Abhijit; Karan; Rakhi; Rashami; Shamita; Tejasswi; Umar		Karan; Pratik; Rakhi; Shamita	Karan; Nishant; Pratik; Rakhi; Shamita; Tejasswi		No; VIP Members			
Vote to:	None	Evict				Save / Evict	Task		Save	Task	None	Evict	Task	Evict		Task	28-Min	Task	Evict	Task		None		WIN		
Tejasswi	No; Nominations	Donal	Donal; Vidhi	Exempt	Akasa; Simbha	Saved by Gautam	VIP; Member	Nominated	Vishal	Safe	Nominated	Not eligible	Nominated	Not eligible	Rashami	Lost	25:57 mins Shamita (to evict)	Won	Abhijit; Rashami	Lost; Nominated	Won; VIP Member	VIP; Member	No; Nominations	No; Nominations	Winner (Day 120)	
Pratik	Safe	Exempt	Donal; Vidhi	Exempt	Jay; Ieshaan	Ieshaan (to evict)	Nominated	VIP; Member	Neha	Safe	Nominated	Not eligible	Safe	Not eligible	Rashami	Won	Nominated by Karan	Lost	Rashami; Abhijit	Won; VIP Member	VIP; Member		No; Nominations	No; Nominations	1st runner-up (Day 120)	
Karan	No; Nominations	Donal	Donal; Vidhi	Karan	Vishal; Miesha	Saved by Kamya	VIP; Member	Nominated	Umar	Safe	Nominated	Not eligible	Nominated	Nishant	Abhijit	Lost	34:02 Mins; Pratik (to evict)	Won	Rashami; Abhijit	VIP; Member			No; Nominations	No; Nominations	2nd runner-up (Day 120)	
Shamita	Safe	House; Captain	Donal; Vidhi	Shamita	Ieshaan; Vishal	Not eligible	Nominated	Walked (Day 44)	Rajiv	Safe	Nominated	Not eligible	Safe	Umar	Abhijit	Won	Nominated by Tejasswi	Won	Abhijit; Rakhi	House Captain; VIP Member		VIP; Member	No; Nominations	No; Nominations	3rd runner-up (Day 120)	
Nishant	Safe	Exempt	House; Captain		Akasa; Vishal	Not eligible	VIP; Member		Jay	Safe	Safe	Not eligible	Nominated	Devoleena	Rashami	Won	Safe	Lost	Rakhi; Abhijit	Nominated	Won; VIP Member	VIP; Member	No; Nominations	No; Nominations	Walked, 4th runner-up (Day 120)	
Rashami	Not In House										VIP; Member	Umar	Safe	Umar	Abhijit	Nominated	33:58 mins	Won	Abhijit; Tejasswi	Lost	Lost	Nominated	No; Nominations	No; Nominations	5th runner-up (Day 120)	
Rakhi	Not In House										VIP; Member	Karan; Nishant	VIP; Member	Not eligible	Abhijit	VIP; Member			Shamita; Nishant	VIP; Member			No; Nominations	Evicted (Day 117)		
Abhijit	Not In House										VIP; Member	Umar	Nominated	Not eligible	Rashami	Nominated	01:09 hrs	Won	Rashami; Shamita	Nominated	Lost	Nominated	Evicted (Day 114)			
Devoleena	Not In House										VIP; Member	Umar	Safe	Not eligible	Rashami	Won	Nominated By; Rashami	Lost	Abhijit; Tejasswi	Lost	Lost	Nominated	Evicted (Day 114)			
Umar	No; Nominations	Akasa	Donal; Vidhi	Rejected	Simba; Ieshaan	Not eligible	House Captain; VIP Member	VIP; Member	BTM 5	BTM 6	Nominated	Not eligible	Nominated	Shamita	Abhijit	Lost	34-35 mins	Won; Nominated	Ejected (Day 99)							
Rajiv	Not In House				Vishal; Miesha	Not eligible	Nominated	Nominated	BTM 5	BTM 6	Safe	Not eligible	Nominated	Evicted (Day 78)							Guest (Days 108–114)		Left (Day 114)			
Ritesh	Not In House										VIP; Member	Tejasswi	Nominated	Evicted (Day 78)												
Jay	No; Nominations	Akasa	Donal; Vidhi	Exempt	Pratik; Vishal	Saved by Devoleena	Nominated	Nominated	BTM 5	BTM 6	Evicted (Day 54)															
Neha	Not In House						Nominated	Nominated	BTM 5	BTM 6	Evicted (Day 55)															
Vishal	No; Nominations	Ieshaan	Donal; Vidhi	Not eligible	Akasa; Simba	Saved by Rashami	VIP; Member		BTM 5	BTM 6	Evicted (Day 54)															
Simba	No; Nominations	Vishal	Donal; Vidhi	Rejected	Ieshaan; Akasa	Umar (to evict)	Nominated	VIP; Member	BTM 5	Evicted By Housemates (Day 53)																
Afsana	No; Nominations	Vishal	Donal; Vidhi	Vishal	Akasa; Simba	Simba; Nishant (to evict)	Not eligible	Ejected (Day 40)																		
Raqesh	Not In House						Not eligible	Walked (Day 40)																		
Ieshaan	No; Nominations	Afsana	Donal; Vidhi	Rejected	Akasa; Simba	Not eligible	Evicted (Day 36)																			
Miesha	No; Nominations	Afsana	Donal; Vidhi	Rejected	Vishal; Umar	Nominated	Evicted (Day 35)																			
Akasa	No; Nominations	Vishal	Donal; Vidhi	Exempt	Vishal; Afsana	Evicted (Day 29)																				
Donal	No; Nominations	Vidhi	Donal; Vidhi	Evicted By Housemates (Day 18)																						
Vidhi	No; Nominations	Ieshaan	Donal; Vidhi	Evicted By Housemates (Day 18)																						
Sahil S	No; Nominations	Evicted (Day 8)																								
Notes	1,2,3	3	4	5	6	7, 8	9,10,11		11,12,13	14	15	None														
Against Public Vote	Afsana; Akasa; Donal; Ieshaan; Jay; Karan; Miesha; Sahil; Simba; Tejasswi; Umar; Vidhi; Vishal	Afsana; Akasa; Donal; Ieshaan; Vidhi; Vishal	None	Ieshaan; Karan; Miesha; Shamita; Simba; Umar; Vishal	Akasa; Simba; Vishal	Ieshaan; Miesha; Nishant; Simba; Umar	Jay; Pratik; Rajiv; Shamita; Simba	Jay; Karan; ~~Pratik~~; Rajiv; ~~Simba~~; Tejasswi	Jay; Rajiv; Simba; Umar; Vishal	Jay; Rajiv; Umar; Vishal	Karan; ~~Nishant~~; Pratik; ~~Rajiv~~; Shamita; Tejasswi; Umar	Karan; Nishant; Pratik; Shamita; Tejasswi; Umar	Abhijit; Karan; Nishant; Rajiv; Ritesh; Tejasswi; Umar	Nishant; Pratik; Shamita; Umar	Abhijit; ~~Karan~~; Pratik; Shamita; ~~Tejasswi~~; Umar			Nishant; Pratik; Umar	Abhijit; Nishant; Tejasswi		Abhijit; Devoleena; Rashami		Karan; Nishant; Pratik; Shamita; Tejasswi	Karan; Nishant; Pratik; Rashami; Shamita; Tejasswi		
Re-entered	None							Shamita	None																	
Left	None																					Rajiv	None			
Guest	None																				Rajiv		None			
Walked	None						Raqesh	Shamita	None																	
Ejected	None						Afsana	None										Umar	None							
Evicted	Sahil S	No; Eviction	Donal	No; Eviction	Akasa	Miesha	No; Eviction		Simba	Jay	No; Eviction		Rajiv	No; Eviction								Abhijit	Rakhi	Rashami	Nishant	Shamita
Evicted	Sahil S	No; Eviction	Vidhi	No; Eviction	Akasa	Ieshaan	No; Eviction		Simba	Vishal	No; Eviction		Ritesh	No; Eviction								Devoleena	Rakhi	Rashami	Karan	
Evicted	Sahil S	No; Eviction	Vidhi	No; Eviction	Akasa	Ieshaan	No; Eviction		Simba	Neha	No; Eviction		Ritesh	No; Eviction								Devoleena	Rakhi	Rashami	Pratik	Tejasswi

Color Key

indicates the House Captain.
indicates VIP Member.
indicates that the Housemate was directly nominated for eviction prior and during regular nominations process.
indicates that the housemate has Re-Entered.
indicates that the Housemate was granted immunity from nominations.
indicates the Housemate was ejected
indicates the contestant has walked out of the show.
indicates the contestant has been evicted by housemates.
indicates the contestant has been evicted.

=== Notes ===
- ^1: Donal and Ieshaan were given a condition to return to the Bigg Boss Jungle, the condition was one of them should be nominated in this week, Ieshaan was nominated in a mutual decision.
- ^2: Bigg Boss nominated all housemates in the BB Jungle, for Pratik's behaviour and for damaging the Bigg Boss property.
- ^3: The main house members are safe from nominations.
- ^4: As a punishment for not following the house rules, all housemates had to mutually decide to evict two housemates immediately from the house.
- ^5: Captain Nishant had to nominate 8 housemates. Those 8 housemates took part in a Room of illusions Task to get a chance to save themselves.
- ^6: No Captain during this week's nominations.
- ^7: 4 celebrities entered the house for nominations and had the power to save one housemate each. Rashami Desai saved Vishal, Gautam Gulati saved Tejasswi, Devoleena saved Jay, Kamya saved Karan.
- ^8: Karan, Tejasswi, Jay and Vishal had the power to nominate one housemate directly for eviction. They nominated Miesha.
- ^9: Raqesh left the house due to a poor health condition
- ^10: Afsana was ejected from the house due to harming herself with a knife
- ^11: VIP Members are safe from Nominations
- ^12: Shamita left the house due to health issues
- ^13: After Nishant won the task, He got a special power to replace 2 VIPs with 2 Non VIPs, They replaced Karan and Tejasswi with Simba and Pratik.
- ^14: All 5 Safe Housemates Have to save 1 bottom housemate each from getting Evicted, Since No one saved Simba, He was evicted
- ^15: The Voting Lines were opened for the Bottom 5 for Live Task, Out of 5, Jay, Vishal and Neha received the Least Votes and were evicted
- ^16: The Top 5 finalists were offered ₹10 lakhs but to obtain the sum of money, they had to walk out of the show. Nishant agreed and thus walked out with the money.
