= H3 Productions =

H3 Productions may refer to:

- the production company of Haarsh Limbachiyaa
- h3h3Productions, the production company of Ethan and Hila Klein
