= Entertainment Ki Raat Housefull =

Indian comedy and game show

- Genre: Comedy show; Game show
- Created by: Neeraj Sharma
- Developed by: The Content Team
- Directed by: Huzefa Qaiser
- Starring: See below
- Country of origin: India
- Original language: Hindi
- No. of episodes: 38

Production
- Producer: Neeraj Sharma
- Running time: 45+ minutes
- Production company: THE CONTENT TEAM

Original release
- Network: Colors TV; Voot
- Release: 15 April – 23 May 2023

Entertainment Ki Raat Housefull (transl. Entertainment Night Housefull) is an Indian reality game show on Colors TV. It premiered on 15 April 2023 to 23 May 2023. It stars Punit Pathak, Haarsh Limbachiyaa, Rubina Dilaik and Gaurav Dubey in main roles.

== Premise ==
Nani (Sudha Chandran) on her deathbed, asks her three grandchildren- Haarsh, Punit and Rubina to torture the guests that come to her house so that she can finally achieve salvation.

== Cast ==
=== Main ===
- Haarsh Limbachiyaa
- Punit Pathak
- Rubina Dilaik
- Gaurav Dubey as various characters

=== Recurring ===
- Sudha Chandran as Nani (Episode 1)
- Archana Gautam (Episode 1-4, 7, 10-14)
- Shiv Thakare (Episode 1, 2, 8-10, 28, 30)
- Sumbul Touqeer (Episode 1, 2, 8-12, 22, 23, 28, 30)
- Arjun Bijlani (Episode 1-4)
- Tejasswi Prakash (Episode 1, 2, 37, 38)
- Karan Kundrra (Episode 1, 2, 37, 38)
- Nikki Tamboli (Episode 3, 4, 8-10)
- Pratik Sehajpal (Episode 3, 4, 7, 10)
- Rashami Desai (Episode 5, 6, 22, 23, 27, 29, 31-33)
- Nishant Bhat (Episode 5, 6, 7, 10)
- Shivin Narang (Episode 5, 6)
- Fahmaan Khan (Episode 8-10, 22, 23, 31-33)
- Reem Shaikh (Episode 11, 12)
- Arjit Taneja (Episode 11, 12)
- Vishal Aditya Singh (Episode 13)
- Puja Banerjee (Episode 13)
- Neha Kakkar (Episode 14)
- Rohanpreet Singh (Episode 14)
- Abdu Rozik (Episode 28, 30-33)
- Bharti Singh (Episode 31-35, 37, 38)
- Sreejita De
- Tanvi Dogra
- Anchal Sahu
- Ankur Verma
- Sanam Johar
- Pratik Utekar
- Vaishnavi Patil
- Shweta Sharda
- Antara Biswas
- Abhishek Verma
- Rajiv Adatia

== See also ==
- List of programmes broadcast by Colors TV
