= Arjit Taneja =

Indian television actor (born 1992)

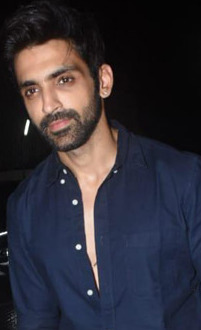
- Taneja in 2023
- Born: 10 November 1992 (age 33); Delhi, India
- Education: University of Delhi
- Occupations: Actor; Model
- Years active: 2013–present

Arjit Taneja (born 10 November 1992) is an Indian actor who primarily works in Hindi Television. He is best known for playing Purab Khanna in Kumkum Bhagya, Vivaan Kapoor in Kaleerein and Virat Singh Ahuja in Kaise Mujhe Tum Mil Gaye. He also emerged as 1st runner up in Khatron Ke Khiladi 13. In 2023 he made his film debut with a cameo role in Rocky Aur Rani Kii Prem Kahaani and Mr. & Mrs. Mahi

== Early life and education ==
Taneja was born on 10 November 1992 in Delhi to Punjabi parents. He attended Modern School, Delhi and graduated with a BA degree in computer programming from Sri Guru Tegh Bahadur Khalsa College, University of Delhi. In 2012, Taneja moved from Delhi to Mumbai to begin his acting career.

== Career ==
=== Career beginnings (2012–2014) ===
In mid-2012, Taneja moved from Delhi to Mumbai and began his acting career in television. That same year, he got a role in Channel V India's V The Serial, produced by Ekta Kapoor.

In 2013, he participated in MTV India MTV Splitsvilla 6.

In 2014, he participated in Sony TV's Box Cricket League, the latter of which was his third with Kapoor. He was later seen in Bade Achhe Lagte Hain on Sony TV.

=== Breakthrough and establishment (2014–present) ===
Taneja's career finally saw a turning point in 2014, when he signed the parallel lead role of Purab Khanna in Zee TV popular daily show Kumkum Bhagya, created by Kapoor. He won the Best Supporting Actor award at the Zee Gold Awards. He left the show in 2016.

Simultaneously along with Kumkum Bhagya, he was seen as Bilal Khan in another Ekta Kapoor production — Sony TV Pyaar Ko Ho Jaane Do in 2015.

In 2016, he presented Zing Pyaar Tune Kya Kiya.

In 2017, Arjit then moved to Indonesia for a few months where he was cast as lead in the Indonesian show Nadin on ANTV alongside his co-star from Kumkum Bhagya Mrunal Thakur and Indonesia Actress Dewi Persik.

Taneja left Indonesia and headed back to Bombay where he landed his first lead role in a TV show. In February 2018, Taneja finally got his first show as a lead where he began essaying the main character of Vivaan Kapoor in Zee TV Kaleerein. It went off air in November 2018.

In May 2018, Arjit also appeared as a guest in Zee TV talk show Juzz Baatt with Sana Saeed, Adnan Khan and Karan Jotwani.

Arjit was a Red Carpet host for Zee Rishtey Awards 2019.

In July 2019, Arjit was cast as lead male actor in Colors TV love triangle-themed Bahu Begum which premiered on 15 July 2019. In the show Taneja's character was Azaan Akhtar Mirza, the Nawab of Bhopal which co-starred Samiksha Jaiswal and Diana Khan. It ended on 21 January 2020.

Arjit also made a special appearance at the ITA Awards in 2020.

In January 2021, he bagged the cameo role of Farishta, an angel in the supernatural revenge thriller Naagin 5 and reprised the same role in February 2021 for Kuch Toh Hai: Naagin Ek Naye Rang Mein, both of which were aired on Colors TV and created by Ekta Kapoor.

Arjit then landed the lead role as Shambhu Thakur on Nath – Zewar Ya Zanjeer on Dangal TV. The show premiered on 23 August 2021. But after a few months inside the show, he decided to quit the show. Arjit when interviewed said, “he did not see his role shaping up as he wanted it to be”. Arjit's last shoot day was 7 March 2022 and his final episode aired on 10 March 2022, Episode 172.

On 22 March 2022, it was confirmed Arjit had been roped in to be a candidate as a suitor for Parineeti Chopra alongside other television actors Vishal Aditya Singh and Shivin Narang on Hunarbaaz: Desh Ki Shaan "Parineeti Ka Swayamvar" on Colors TV. Taneja was seen doing just about everything from presenting her with roses, complimenting her with his soothing words, to getting down on one knee and even cooking to impress the Hasee Toh Phasee actress. Judges Karan Johar, Mithun Chakraborty and hosts Bharti Singh and Haarsh Limbachiya were there to assist Parineeti Chopra in taking the right decision. Veteran singer Kumar Sanu also joined the panel as a special guest. When called on stage to showcase his cooking skill by making Parineeti Chopra’s favorite ‘Aloo Paratha’, Taneja was quite impressive. The actress could not resist the taste and initially she announced the winner : Best aloo paratha goes to her Punjabi munda, Arjit. Still indecisive of a suitor, Karan Johar then suggested they do a Bollywood Quiz via a Miss India format. Parineeti then chose Arjit as ‘Mr. India’ and Runner-Up Shivin Narang. After being quizzed, Taneja won with his impeccable and quick responses. Hunarbaaz: Desh Ki Shaan special episodes were aired on Saturday 26 and Sunday 27 March at 9pm and 7pm on Colors TV.

In April 2022, Taneja once more reprised his role as Farishta in Naagin 6 on Colors TV.

In September 2022, it was made public knowledge that Arjit would join StarPlus show Banni Chow Home Delivery which starred Ulka Gupta and Pravisht Mishra. His character is a ‘Rockstar’ Agastya Kapoor. Arjit was quoted as saying, "I was looking for something that could challenge me as an actor and the Banni Chow offer came at the right time. I will have a grand entry as a rockstar and it will bring along a lot of mystery and suspense”. His first episode aired on 14 September 2022. After a few months on the show, Arjit decided to move on and his last shoot day was 1 December 2022. His final episode aired on 1 December 2022.

In January 2023, Arjit and Sanaya Irani teamed up for another collab. Butterflies Season 4 EP 5 Upgrade web series was released on February 12.

In April 2023, Arjit then made a guest appearance on Colors TV Entertainment Ki Raat Housefull.

Also in April 2023, he participated in Fear Factor: Khatron Ke Khiladi 13 where he emerged up as first runner up

In July 2023, he made a cameo appearance in Karan Johar's Rocky Aur Rani Kii Prem Kahaani.

Arjit was also cast in Fuh Se Fantasy web series opposite Nyra Banerjee. Season 2 EP 1 premiered on 17 August 2023 on Jio Cinema.

In November 2023, he was cast as the lead opposite his former Kumkum Bhagya co-actor Sriti Jha in Zee TV's Kaise Mujhe Tum Mil Gaye which gained him immense popularity for his character Virat Singh Ahuja. The show ended in May 2025 completing more than 500 episodes. In June 2025, he started playing lead character Rishi Chatterjee in StarPlus's Jhanak opposite Riya Sharma. In September 2025, he quit the show.

== Filmography ==
=== Films ===
Year	Title	Role	Notes	Ref.
2023	Rocky Aur Rani Kii Prem Kahaani	Sunny	Cameo	
2024	Mr. & Mrs. Mahi	Sikandar Aggarwal		

=== Television ===
Year	Title	Role	Notes	Ref.
2012	V The Serial	Himself		
2013	Bade Achhe Lagte Hain	Unnamed	Cameo appearance	
2013	MTV Splitsvilla 6	Contestant	13th place	
2014–2016	Kumkum Bhagya	Purab Khanna		
2014–2016	Box Cricket League	Contestant		
2015	Bad Company	Himself	Guest appearance	
2015	Pyaar Ko Ho Jaane Do	Bilal Khan		
2016	Pyaar Tune Kya Kiya	Host		
2017	Nadin	Ishaan	Indonesian TV Serial	
2018	Kaleerein	Vivaan Kapoor		
2018	Juzzbaatt	Himself	Guest appearance	
2019	Api & Cinta	Sunjoy	Indonesian TV Serial	
2019–2020	Bahu Begum	Azaan Akhtar Mirza		
2021	Naagin 5	Farishta	Cameo appearance	
2021	Kuch Toh Hai: Naagin Ek Naye Rang Mein	Farishta	Cameo appearance	
2021–2022	Nath – Zewar Ya Zanjeer	Shambhu Thakur		
2022	Hunarbaaz: Desh Ki Shaan	Himself	Guest appearance	
2022	Naagin 6	Farishta		
2022	Banni Chow Home Delivery	Agastya Kapoor		
2023	Bekaboo	Vansh Raichand	Cameo appearance	
2023	Entertainment Ki Raat Housefull	Himself	Guest appearance	
2023	Fear Factor: Khatron Ke Khiladi 13	Contestant	1st runner-up	
2023–2025	Kaise Mujhe Tum Mil Gaye	Virat Singh Ahuja		
2025	Jhanak	Rishi Chatterjee		
2026–present	Dr. Aarambhi	Dhruv Chawla Tandon		

=== Music videos ===
Year	Title	Singer(s)	Ref.
2018	Main Jaandiyaan	Meet Bros, Neha Bhasin, Piyush Mehroliyaa	
2019	Naseeba	Shaan	
2019	Farishta	Arko Pravo Mukherjee, Asees Kaur	
2020	Ik Dafa To Mil	Oye Kunaal	

== Awards and nominations ==
Year	Award	Category	Work	Result	Ref.
2015	Indian Telly Awards	Actor in a Supporting Role (Drama)	Kumkum Bhagya	Nominated	
2016	Gold Awards	Best Actor in a Supporting Role	Kumkum Bhagya	Won	
2022	Indian Television Academy Awards	Best Actor (Popular)	Nath Zewar Ya Zanjeer	Nominated	
