= PM Narendra Modi (film) =

2019 Indian propaganda film

- Theatrical release poster
- Directed by: Omung Kumar
- Written by: Dialogues: Anirudh Chawla; Vivek Oberoi; Haarsh Limbachiyaa
- Screenplay by: Anirudh Chawla; Vivek Oberoi
- Story by: Sandip Singh
- Starring: Vivek Oberoi; Zarina Wahab
- Cinematography: Sunita Radia
- Edited by: Sanjay Sankla
- Music by: Songs: Shashi-Khuhi; Hitesh Modak; Score: Hitesh Modak
- Production companies: Legend Global Studio; Anand Pandit Motion Pictures
- Distributed by: Panorama Studios; Anand Pandit Motion Pictures
- Release date: 24 May 2019
- Running time: 136 minutes
- Country: India
- Language: Hindi
- Budget: ₹8 crore
- Box office: ₹2.51 crores

PM Narendra Modi is an Indian Hindi-language propaganda film released in 2019. It was directed by Omung Kumar, written by Anirudh Chawla and Vivek Oberoi, and produced under the banner of Legend Studios. The film is a hagiography of Narendra Modi, the prime minister of India since 2014. Its original release schedule on the opening day of the 2019 Indian general election caused significant backlash, leading to the film being banned by the Election Commission of India (ECI) for the duration of the general election. It was only released after the election's conclusion, receiving overwhelmingly negative reviews from critics.

== Plot ==
Narendra Modi begins life as a poor tea seller before leaving home at a young age to become a Sannyasi in the Himalayas. He later returns to Gujarat and joins the Rashtriya Swayamsevak Sangh (RSS). After opposing the State of Emergency imposed by prime minister Indira Gandhi, the RSS assigns Modi to the Bharatiya Janata Party (BJP) in 1980.

Modi struggles with grassroots work across Gujarat but works tirelessly to help people and win their support. After the BJP wins the 1998 Gujarat Legislative Assembly election, Keshubhai Patel becomes chief minister. Modi is transferred to New Delhi for organisational work, but returns to Gujarat in 2001, shortly before the 2001 Gujarat earthquake. He replaces Patel as chief minister and is selected as the BJP's candidate for the next Gujarat Legislative Assembly election.

The 2002 Gujarat violence is portrayed as an attempt to destabilise Modi's government, shortly before he wins the 2002 Gujarat Legislative Assembly election. The film portrays the United States and other countries' denial of visa entry to Modi following the violence as a conspiracy covertly aligned with the political opposition. The film concludes with Modi leading the BJP to victory in the 2014 Indian general election and being elected prime minister.

== Cast ==
- Vivek Oberoi as Narendra Modi
- Manoj Joshi as Amit Shah
- Sheila Gore as Sonia Gandhi
- Akshat R Saluja as Joshi Chief Minister Modi's PA
- Darshan Kumar as Corrupt News Reporter
- Navneet Gairola as OSD to PM
- Boman Irani as Ratan Tata
- Barkha Sengupta as Jashodaben Modi
- Aanjjan Srivastav as Atal Bihari Vajpayee
- Zarina Wahab as Hiraben Modi
- Suresh Oberoi as Swami Dayanand Giri, Narendra Modi's Guru in the Himalayas
- Kishori Shahane as Indira Gandhi
- Prashant Narayanan
- Naresh Vohra as Murli Manohar Joshi
- Bhavik Bhojak as Inspector Arjun Patel in Akshardham, Gandhinagar
- Rajendra Gupta as Damodardas Modi

== Production ==
Initially actor Paresh Rawal was to play Narendra Modi in a biopic that he was also producing. Before that film was materialised, PM Narendra Modi was announced in parallel with Vivek Oberoi selected to play the lead role.

=== Principal photography ===
Filming began on 28 January 2019 in Ahmedabad, Gujarat. Some vital scenes in the film chronicling Modi's early life and political journey was filmed in Uttarkashi district, Uttarakhand. Final schedule of filming was held at Mumbai. Vivek was injured during the shoot while doing a scene in Uttarkashi.

== Soundtrack ==
PM Narendra Modi

Soundtrack album by Hitesh Modak and Shashi-Khushi
- Released: 29 March 2019
- Recorded: 2018
- Genre: Feature film soundtrack
- Length: 21:26
- Language: Hindi
- Label: T-Series
- Producers: Meghdeep Bose; Hitesh Modak
External audio
- Audio Jukebox on YouTube

The music of the film is composed by Hitesh Modak and Shashi-Khushi while the lyrics are written by Javed Akhtar, Prasoon Joshi, Sameer, Abhendra Upadhyay, Irshad Kamil, Parry G. and Lavraj. Two songs, one Suno Gaur Se Duniya Walon from Salman Khan and Sanjay Dutt starrer a 1997 unfinished film Dus and the other Ishwar Allah from the film 1947: Earth, starring Aamir Khan, Nandita Das and lyrics by Javed Akhtar used in this film.

Initially, Javed Akhtar and Sameer were unaware about their works from old films being reused in this film. They tweeted they have not written any songs for the film after finding their names on the film' credit row. The film's producer Sandip Ssingh clarified that the credits were given because their songs from previous movies were included.

Music Composer Shashi Suman (Shashi-Khushi Duo) collaborated with music producer Meghdeep Bose on songs "Saugandh Mujhe Iss Mitti Ki", "Hindustani" & "Fakeera".

Track listing
No.	Title	Lyrics	Music	Singer(s)	Length
1.	"Saugandh Mujhe Iss Mitti Ki"	Prasoon Joshi	Shashi-Khushi	Sukhwinder Singh, Shashi Suman	3:55
2.	"Namo Namo"	Lavraj, Parry G	Hitesh Modak	Sandip Ssingh; Rap: Parry G	2:11
3.	"Hindustani" (Original lyrics by Sameer)	Sardaraa, Rap: Parry G	Shashi-Khushi	Siddharth Mahadevan, Shashi Suman, Rap: Parry G	3:30
4.	"Fakeera"	Irshad Kamil	Shashi-Khushi	Raja Hasan, Shashi Suman	3:44
5.	"Junoon"	Lavraj	Hitesh Modak	Javed Ali	3:37
6.	"Ishwar Allah" (Original lyrics by Javed Akhtar)	Lavraj	Hitesh Modak	Suvarna Tiwari	4:29
Total length:					21:26

== Release and controversy ==
The film faced significant backlash from several opposition parties, including the Indian National Congress (Also called "Congress" simply), which described it as a hagiography and argued that its release on 11 April 2019, the opening day of the 2019 Indian general election, would amount to propaganda. Kapil Sibal, an official candidate from the Congress party, said, "The purpose of the film is only political, to get extra mileage in the elections", adding "This is no artistic venture". In a petition to the Election Commission of India (ECI), the Congress demanded that the film's release be postponed until after the election. At the same time, the ruling Bharatiya Janata Party (BJP) sought to distance itself from the film, saying, "Independent artists, influenced by the lifestyle of Prime Minister Narendra Modi, created the film and the BJP is in no way, involved in the making of it".

The National Student's Union of India's Goa unit wrote to the ECI, demanding a strict ban on the screening of the film from ever happening, claiming that it had violated the election commission's code of conduct of elections. A plea filed at the Supreme Court of India to stop the release of the film was initially rejected. The court stated that the ECI was the appropriate body to address the petitioner's concerns. The ECI subsequently banned the release of the film for the duration of the general election, stating that any biopic material "subserving the purposes of a political entity" and that had "the potential to disturb the level playing field during the elections, should not be displayed anywhere." The film theatrically released worldwide on 24th May of 2019, after the elections had been completed. A new poster of movie was released a day before the initial release of the film, with the tagline being "Ab aa rahe hai dobara, PM Narendra Modi. Ab koi rok nahi sakta" (lit. 'Now, PM Narendra Modi is returning to power, now no one can stop him'), celebrating Modi's victory of the election.

== Reception ==
=== Critical response ===
The film received overwhelmingly negative reviews by critics, who criticised it for being a propaganda film and a hagiography, as well as criticising Oberoi's performance. On the review aggregator website Rotten Tomatoes, the film has an approval rating of 0% based on 10 negative reviews.

Ananya Bhattacharya of India Today took note of the film's bias towards the protagonist: "Even the most controversial parts of PM Narendra Modi's life – the Godhra riots – are planted on the Opposition as a way to keep Modi from serving his people". Nandini Ramnath of Scroll.in wrote, "Any insights the movie offers into Modi's rise are inadvertent. The monomaniacal focus on one man above all else will surely be of interest to those who study how cinema can be used for propaganda". Renuka Vyavahare of The Times of India gave the film two and a half stars out of five and criticised the script, opining, "This one is too lopsided for you to appreciate. It leaves a lot unanswered. While it firmly believes ‘Modi ek insaan nahi, soch hai’, we wish the script was as thoughtful". However, she was among the few who appreciated Oberoi's performance, stating, "He gets the mannerisms, accent and tone right and thankfully doesn't overdo it". Writing for The Indian Express, Shubhra Gupta gave the movie two stars out of five and stated, "The film is not a mere bio-pic, it is a full-fledged, unabashed, unapologetic hagiography". Kennith Rosario of The Hindu summarised the movie's narrative as "a obsequious love letter" to the protagonist which tells the audience "How sincere, hardworking, fair and honest Modi is, [and] that it makes you wonder if life is a parody of this film".

The Congress claimed that the BJP was using Bollywood as a propaganda machine and the movie aimed to serve a perilous mix of high-pitched nationalism and strongman branding of Modi.

=== Box office ===
The film collected ₹2.25-2.5 crore on its opening day and was the second best-performing film among all others released in India on that day, after Aladdin (2019). The following day, it earned ₹3 crore. Collections on Sunday showed minor growth with earnings of ₹4.25 crore. Monday earnings dropped 20 percent from the opening day for a total of ₹1.85 crore. On Tuesday, the film earned ₹1.7 crore. The film earned ₹1.5 crore and ₹1.1 crore on Wednesday and Thursday.

== See also ==
- 7 RCR
- Pradhanmantri
- Modi: Journey of a Common Man
