= Amin Gazi =

Indian actor

Personal details
- Born: 31 December 1988 (age 37) Bombay, Maharashtra State, India (present-day Mumbai, Maharashtra)
- Spouse(s): Shaheena Taj Begum (2014-2018); Aaliya Zariwala (2022-present)

Amin Gazi is an Indian Actor. He was seen in 2001 Film Lagaan and 2003 Comedy Film Hungama.

== Filmography ==
- Lagaan (2001)
- Stumped (2003)
- Hungama (2003)
- Matrubhoomi (2003)
- Tauba Tauba (2004)
- Cambala Investigation Agency (2007-2009) as Farhan Siddiqui
- Khelein Hum Jee Jaan Sey (2010)
