= Hum Tum Aur Quarantine =

Indian comedy show

- Genre: Comedy show
- Written by: Haarsh Limbachiyaa
- Starring: Bharti Singh; Haarsh Limbachiyaa
- Country of origin: India
- Original language: Hindi
- No. of seasons: 1
- No. of episodes: 15

Production
- Producer: Haarsh Limbachiyaa
- Running time: 8-15 minutes

Original release
- Network: Colors TV
- Release: 13 April – 1 May 2020

Hum Tum Aur Quarantine (transl. We, You and Quarantine) is an Indian comedy series that aired on Colors TV, starring Bharti Singh and Haarsh Limbachiyaa. Hum Tum Aur Quarantine started on 13 April 2020 on Colors TV.

== Concept ==
Bharti Singh told Mumbai Mirror online, "With everyone sitting at home during the lockdown and finding new ways of entertaining themselves, we thought it was the best time to put our talent to use. The series has short gags that will focus on fun activities during our lockdown. It is entirely shot by Haarsh and myself from home. We also want to tell everyone to stay indoors, stay safe and enjoy our new series."

== Cast ==
- Bharti Singh
- Haarsh Limbachiyaa

=== Special appearances ===
- Sidharth Shukla
- Aditya Narayan
- Karan Patel
- Karishma Tanna
- Balraj Syal
