= Tauba Tauba =

2004 film by T L V Prasad

- DVD Cover
- Directed by: T L V Prasad
- Written by: T L V Prasad
- Produced by: Evershine Films
- Starring: Payal Rohatgi; Antara Biswas; Amin Gazi
- Music by: Nitin Raikwar; Vikrant Mathur; Vishuraj-Jayant
- Production company: Evershine Films
- Release date: 1 October 2004 (India)
- Running time: 121 minutes
- Country: India
- Language: Hindi

Tauba Tauba (transl. Oh My Oh My) is a 2004 Indian Hindi-language sex comedy film written and directed by T L V Prasad, starring Payal Rohatgi, Antara Biswas, and Amin Gazi. It was directed by T L V Prasad and is a remake of the 1981 American film Private Lessons which starred Sylvia Kristel. It was followed by a sequel in 2008, Phir Tauba Tauba, which was also directed by Prasad.

Tauba Tauba tells the tale of 15-year-old Sunny (Amin Gazi), a motherless child of a business tycoon, Mohan Shanbagh (Ayub Khan). Sunny is a sex addict, partially due to his environment. His school principal Mr. Gomes (Laxmikant Berde), also a sex addict, goes around bedding all the teachers, and at home his Casanova father is involved in love games with secretary Sophia (Rashi Tyagi), who from time to time also teases Sunny with her sexuality. All these factors expose Sunny to sex at a young age, so when Sunny sees 25-year-old Payal (Payal Rohatgi), he is smitten.

== Plot ==
Sunny, a 15 a-year old boy is at school, is on winter vacation in Pune. There we are introduced to Rocky, his multimillionaire father's manager who owes Rs 1 million to Sultan Bhai of Multan. When his father who himself is no slouch when it comes to chasing skirts goes to London on some business, he leaves his son some blank cheques in case there is an emergency. Rocky needs money, not only to pay off the debt, but also to make a movie with his model girlfriend Rubina. Payal also needs money to pay for her boyfriend's medical expenses.

Rocky promises to pay her the money if she can trap his boss' son. Payal then moves into Sunny's neighbourhood to seduce him. Sunny, is treated to watch Payal in bikini, in a very revealing dress soaping her car, in bubbles luxuriating in her bathtub and in other such enlightening poses. Soon, the two get introduced and Sunny gets the opportunity to rub her back and later, get her in bed (later, Payal informs Sunny that they didn't have sex; he was just too drunk to remember anything. That way everyone's chastity is maintained). After having 'sex' with him Payal plays dead. A panicky Sunny goes to Rocky and tells him what happened. Rocky then goes to the lovely neighbour's house, wraps a dummy in a sheet and tells Sunny to bury it. He also deftly clicks some snaps of Sunny burying the 'body'.

Soon Sunny gets a courier from a blackmailer threatening to expose him if he doesn't cough up Rs 10 million. Sunny has no option but to use his father's blank cheques. But somewhere down the line, Payal gets guilt pangs and tells Sunny the truth. The rest of the movie is then about Sunny and Payal who wants to do pashchatap and recovering the money from Rocky.

== Cast ==
- Payal Rohatgi as Payal
- Antara Biswas as Rubina
- Amin Gazi as Sunny
- Laxmikant Berde as Mr. Gomes
- Ayub Khan as Mohan Shanbagh
- Rocky Sandhu as Rocky
- Kishore Bhanushali
- Vikas Kalantari as himself (cameo appearance)
- Sweta Keswani as herself (cameo appearance)
- Arun Daga as himself (cameo appearance)

== Music ==
The film score was composed by various artists such as Nitin Raikwar, Vikrant Mathur, and Vishuraj-Jayant.

== Reception ==
=== Critical response ===
The film was panned by critics upon release. Salil Kumar of Rediff gave the film a negative review, writing, "It is doubtful if anyone would like to spend Rs 100 just to see a couple of women prancing around in colourful undies." Guest reviewer for the BBC, Goher Iqbal Punn, also disliked the film and called it "avoidable fare" and "an ordinary piece of work." Kashif Ali of Fullhyderabad.com gave the film a rating of 3.0 and called it "perverse suffering."
