= Vikrant Singh Rajpoot =

Indian film actor

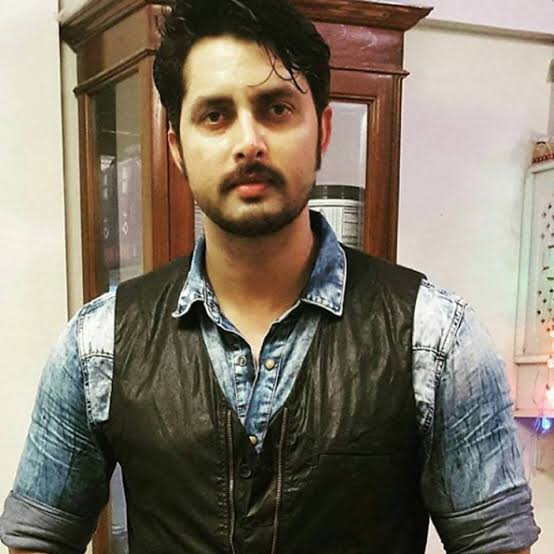
- Born: 29 September 1986 (age 40); Azamgarh, Uttar Pradesh, India
- Occupation: Actor
- Years active: 2010–present
- Spouse: Antara Biswas (m. 2017)

Vikrant Singh Rajpoot (born 29 September 1986) is an Indian actor who works in Bhojpuri language films. He started his film career with the film Mehraru Bina Ratiya Kaise Kati.

== Personal life ==
Singh married actress Antara Biswas in January 2017. Vikrant Singh Rajpoot was a contestant on Nach Baliye Season 8.

== Filmography ==
=== Films ===
Year	Title	Role	Language	Notes
2013	Mehraru Bina Ratiya Kaise Katti		Bhojpuri	
2015	Prem Leela	Prem	Bhojpuri	
2018	Pakistan Me Jai Shri Ram		Bhojpuri	
2018	Border	Vinod Pandey	Bhojpuri	

== Television ==
Year	Title	Role	Notes
2017	Bigg Boss 10	Guest	Day 93-94
2017	Nach Baliye 8	Contestant	8th Place
2019	Vidya	Avtaar Singh	
2022	Smart Jodi	Contestant	With his Wife Antara Biswas
2026	The 50	Contestant	Semi Finalist
