= Bhole Shankar =

- Directed by: Pankaj Shukla
- Written by: Pankaj Shukla
- Produced by: Gulshan Bhatia
- Starring: Mithun Chakraborty; Manoj Tiwari; Monalisa; Master Shivendu
- Cinematography: Raju Kaygee
- Edited by: Prashant-Komal
- Music by: Dhananjay Mishra
- Distributed by: Abhay Sinha
- Release date: 12 September 2008
- Running time: 130 minutes
- Country: India
- Language: Bhojpuri

Bhole Shankar is a 2008 Indian Bhojpuri language masala film directed by Pankaj Shukla and produced by Gulshan Bhatia, starring Mithun Chakraborty and Manoj Tiwari. The film broke the standing record for biggest opening for a Bhojpuri film. It is the first Bhojpuri film of Mithun Chakraborty and Monalisa.

== Synopsis ==
Bhole Shankar centres on two unemployed brothers: Shankar and Bhole. Shankar goes on to become a crime don.

== Cast ==
- Mithun Chakraborty as Shankar
- Manoj Tiwari as Bhole
- Monalisa
- Lovy Rohtagi
- Gopal Singh
- Shabnam Kapoor
- Rajesh Vivek
- Shivendu Shukla
- Nishtha
- Ujjwal

== Soundtrack ==
The film's music was composed by Dhananjay Mishra and the lyrics were written by Bipin Bahaar. Playback singer Shailender Singh came out of retirement to perform the song "Jai Ho Chhath Maiya" for the film.

1. "Re Bauraee Chanchal Kirniya" – Raja Hasan
2. "Dil Ke Haal Bataeen Kaise" – Mauli Dave
3. "Tori Marji" -Poonam Yadav, Manoj Tiwari
4. "Piya More Gaile Rama" – Indu Sonali
5. "Naak Ke Nathiya" – Manoj Tiwari
6. "Kehu Sapna Mein" – Kalpana, Udit Narayan
7. "Jai Ho Chhath Maiya" – Shailendra Singh, Malini Awasthi
8. "Jab Jab Aave Yaad" – Indu Sonali, Ujjaini, Manoj Tiwari
9. "Ae Bhai Ji" – Manoj Tiwari

== Box office ==
The film was initially banned in Bihar.
