= Hamaar Devdas =

2011 Indian Bhojpuri film

- Directed by: Kirankanta Verma
- Story by: Based on Devdas by Sarat Chandra Chattopadhyay
- Starring: Ravi Kishan; Antara Biswas
- Music by: Birju-Vansi
- Distributed by: Sigma Cinema Vision
- Release date: 8 August 2011
- Running time: 145 minutes
- Country: India
- Language: Bhojpuri

Hamaar Devdas is a 2011 Indian Bhojpuri-language romantic drama film directed by Kirankant Verma based on Sarat Chandra Chattopadhyay's 1917 classic novel Devdas. The film was released on 8 August 2011 under the banner of Sigma Cinema Vision.

== Plot ==
The film tells the tragedy of Devdas a wealthy young man who falls into self-destruction and alcoholism after loosing his childhood love interest Parvati.

== Cast ==
- Ravi Kishan as Devdas
- Antara Biswas as Parvati
- Akshara Singh as Chandramukhi
- Umesh Singh
