= Favvara Chowk =

- Genre: Comedy
- Starring: Bharti Singh; Monalisa; Ali Asgar; Abhishek Verma; Haarsh Limbachiyaa; Samriddhi Mehra; Surabhi Mehra
- Country of origin: India
- Original language: Hindi
- No. of seasons: 1
- No. of episodes: 30

Production
- Producers: Bharti Singh; Haarsh Limbachiyaa
- Camera setup: Multi-camera
- Running time: 22-24 minutes
- Production company: H3 Entertainment

Original release
- Network: Dangal TV
- Release: 5 December 2022 – 7 January 2023

Favvara Chowk (transl. Fountain Square) is an Indian television comedy series. Produced by H3 Entertainment, premiered on 5 December 2022 on Dangal TV. It stars Bharti Singh, Monalisa, Ali Asgar, Abhishek Verma, Surabhi Mehra, Samriddhi Mehra and Haarsh Limbachiyaa.

== Plot ==
The series is based in Indore, revolves around Ashok who runs a Jhama Jham Cafe with his son Manoj and Rama who runs her Madhuri Beauty Parlour with her twin daughters.

== Cast ==
- Bharti Singh as Favvara Devi
- Ali Asgar as Ashok
- Monalisa as Rama
- Abhishek Verma as Manoj Indori
- Samriddhi Mehra as Riddhi
- Surabhi Mehra as Siddhi
- Haarsh Limbachiyaa as Pappi Faraar

== Production ==
The series was announced in 2022 by Dangal TV. The promo of the series was released in November 2022. Monalisa and Ali Asgar were signed as the lead. The series is set in Indore, shooting began in November 2022 and mainly shot at the Film City, Mumbai.

== See also ==
- List of programmes broadcast by Dangal TV
- List of Hindi comedy shows
