= The Big Picture (Indian TV series) =

Indian game show

- Presented by: Ranveer Singh
- Country of origin: India
- Original language: Hindi
- No. of seasons: 1
- No. of episodes: 26

Production
- Running time: 60-75 mins approx.
- Production companies: Banijay Asia; SK TV

Original release
- Network: Colors TV
- Release: 16 October 2021 – 9 January 2022

The Big Picture is an Indian Hindi-language television game show that aired from 16 October 2021 to 9 January 2022 on Colors TV. It was hosted by Ranveer Singh.

== Overview ==
The Big Picture is a 12-stage trivia-based game show in which participants answer multiple-choice questions related to images that appear in front of them on a large screen. The quiz game gives the audience a chance to win a fortune. With the help of three lifelines, the contestant will have to answer 12 visual-based questions to win the prize money. The quiz show tests contestants’ knowledge and visual memory and gives them a chance to win Rs 5 crore. The show is hosted by Bollywood actor Ranveer Singh.

== Guest appearances ==
Guest(s)	Winnings (₹)	Notes
Janhvi Kapoor and Sara Ali Khan	10,00,000	Special appearance
Priyanka Chahar Choudhary and Nimrit Kaur Ahluwalia	2,00,000	Karva Chauth special
Rohit Shetty and Katrina Kaif	50,00,000	To promote Sooryavanshi
Saif Ali Khan and Rani Mukherjee	20,00,000	To promote Bunty Aur Babli 2
Salman Khan, Aayush Sharma, and Mahima Makwana	50,00,000	To promote Antim: The Final Truth
Mouni Roy and Ekta Kapoor	10,00,000	Special Appearance
Bharti Singh and Haarsh Limbachiyaa	10,00,000	To promote Indian Game Show
Govinda	10,00,000	To promote his YouTube Channel Govinda Royalles
Sonakshi Sinha and Shatrughan Sinha	20,00,000	Special Appearance
Karan Johar and Kajol	50,00,000	Special Appearance

== Production ==
The first promo debuted on 3 July 2021, featuring Ranveer Singh as host.
