= Antara Biswas =

Indian actress

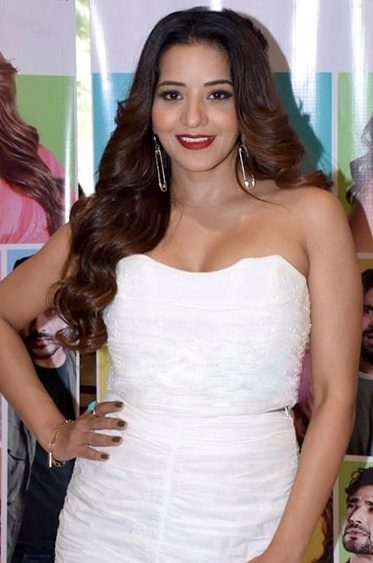
- Monalisa in 2022
- Born: Antara Biswas; 21 November 1982 (age 43); Calcutta, West Bengal, India
- Other name: Monalisa
- Occupation: Actress
- Years active: 1997–present
- Spouse: Vikrant Singh Rajpoot (m. 2017)

Antara Biswas (born 21 November 1982), known professionally as Monalisa, is an Indian actress who primarily works in Bhojpuri films and Hindi television. She participated as a contestant on Bigg Boss 10 in 2016 and is best known for portraying Mohana Rathod in the supernatural drama Nazar. Monalisa is considered as one of the highest paid Bhojpuri actress.

== Early life ==
Antara Biswas was born on 21 November 1982, to a Bengali Hindu family on 21 November. She adopted the stage name of Monalisa at the behest of her uncle. She studied at Julien Day School in Elgin Road, South Kolkata, and graduated from Ashutosh College of the University of Calcutta, earning a BA degree in Sanskrit before starting out a few years ago as a small-time TV actress and model in Odia video albums.

== Career ==
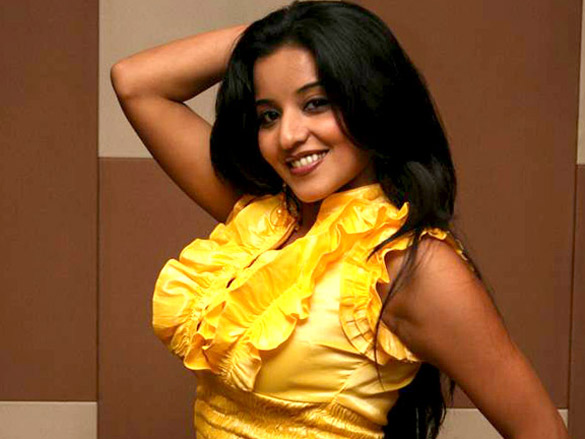
Monalisa in 2010

Monalisa acted in several low-budget films before making her debut in Bollywood with Blackmail, starring Ajay Devgn and Suniel Shetty. She then acted in South Indian films before coming to notice through her role in Tauba Tauba opposite Amin Gazi. She acted in a Kannada film titled Jackpot.

Monalisa made her Bhojpuri film debut with Bhole Shankar alongside Mithun Chakraborty and Manoj Tiwari. The film was a major commercial success and broke the standing record for biggest opening for a Bhojpuri film. She further established herself as a leading actress in Bhojpuri cinema with successful films such as Hum Bahubali, Saat Saheliyan, Devra Bada Satawela and Devra Bhail Deewana among others.

Monalisa's most notable role on television include her playing Mohana Mehta Rathod in Nazar, Iravati Verma in Namak Issk Ka and Yamini Raichand in Bekaboo. In 2022, she participated in Smart Jodi with her husband, Vikrant Singh Rajpoot and later played Rama in Favvara Chowk.

== Personal life ==
She married Bhojpuri actor Vikrant Singh Rajpoot in the Bigg Boss house on 17 January 2017.

== Media image ==
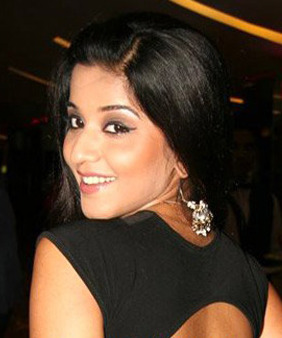
Monalisa in 2009

Monalisa is considered in the media as one of the most popular and highest paid Bhojpuri actress. She is also one of the most followed Bhojpuri actress on Instagram with over 5.8 million followers. In 2010, The Hindu stated that Monalisa (along with Rinku Ghosh) was the most sought after actress in the Bhojpuri film industry.

== Filmography ==
=== Bhojpuri films ===
Year	Title	Role	Notes	Ref.
2007/ 2008	Bidhatar Lekha(2007) Bhole Shankar	Debut	Bengali	
2007/ 2008	Khatailal Mithailal			
2007/ 2008	Kaha Jaiba Raja Najariya Ladaike			
2007/ 2008	Tu Babua Hamaar			
2007/ 2008	Shrimaan Driver Babu			
2009	Ho Gaini Deewana Tohra Pyar Me			
2009	Kahan Jaiba Raja Nazariya Ladai Ke			
2009	Hum Bahubali	Radhika		
2009	Dulha Albela	Dulhan		
2009	Ranbhoomi			
2009	Pratigya	Dancer	Special appearance in song "Lehariya Luta Ae Raja"	
2009	Hum Hai Khalnayak			
2009	Sindur Daan			
2009	Jade Mein Balma Pyara Lage			
2009	Sahar Wali Jaan Mareli			
2010	Ek Aur Kurukshetra			
2010	Tu Jaan Hau Hamaar			
2010	Dharmatma			
2010	Nathuniya Pe Goli Maare			
2010	Bhojpuriya Don	Don's lover		
2010	Rangbaz Daroga	Aanchal		
2010	Nainihal			
2010	Saat Saheliyan	Mona		
2010	Devra Bada Satawela	Mona		
2010	Mrityunjay		Special appearance	
2010	Loafer			
2010	Kanoon Hamra Mutthi Mein			
2010	Daraar			
2011	Mora Balma Chail Chabila			
2011	Apne Begaane			
2011	Aakhri Rasta	Bindu		
2011	Barood			
2011	The Great Hero Hiralal	Hiralal's lover		
2011	Gundairaj			
2011	Ladaai La Ankhiyan Ae Lounde Raja			
2011	Kartavya			
2011	Hamaar Devdas	Paro		
2012	Bhaiya Hamar Dayavan			
2012	Mehraru Bina Ratiya Kaise Kati			
2012	Dacait			
2012	Khuddar	Sunita		
2012	Naagin			
2012	Khoon Pasina	Rama		
2012	Elan E Jung			
2013	Bhaiya Hamar Dayavan			
2013	Rang De Pyar Ke Rang Mein			
2013	Jaan Lebu Ka Ho			
2013	Banaraswali			
2013	Pratibandh			
2013	Desh Pardesh			
2013	Kasam Wardi Ke			
2013	Biwi No. 1			
2013	Lagal Sanheiya Ke Dor			
2013	Saala Main To Sahib Ban Gaya			
2013	Ziddi Aashiq			
2013	Saawariyan Tose Laagi Kaisi Lagan			
2013	Mati Preet Jagawale			
2013	Zanzeer			
2013	Ishq Ka Manjan Ghise Hai Piya			
2013	Gumrah			
2013	Ijjat			
2013	Chhamia Bhelwali			
2013	Jeevan Yudhh			
2013	Saiyan Bhailan Pardesiyaa			
2013	Jodi No. 1			
2013	Ghulam			
2013	Mita Deb Raavanraaj			
2013	Budhwa Tamtamwala			
2013	Lagal Ba Pyar Ke Bukhar			
2013	Tulsi Bin Suna Anganwa	Tulsi		
2013	Ganga Putra			
2013	Chedi Ganga Kinarewala			
2013	Natawar Lal			
2013	Ek Nihattha			
2014	Devra Bhail Deewana	Mona		
2014	Khoon Bhari Hamaar Maang	Mona		
2014	Adalat			
2014	Tere Naam			
2014	Kare La Kamaal Dharti Ke Laal			
2015	Raja Babu	Dolly Singh		
2015	Prem Leela			
2015	Saiyan Toofani			
2015	Suhag			
2015	Rakhtbhoomi			
2017	Sarkar Raj			
2017	Jai Shree Ram			
2017	Pawan Raja	Mona		
2018	Jeena Marna Tere Sang	Sita		
2018	Dulhan Chahi Pakistan Se 2	Dancer	Special appearance in song "Susuk Susuk Ke Royi Thi"	
2018	Dabangg Mora Balma			
2018	Mafia			

=== Other language films ===
Year	Title	Role	Language	Notes	Ref.
1997	Jayate	Aarti	Hindi		
1998	Hamam fi Amsterdam		Odia		
1999	Jai Sriram	Rima Das	Odia		
2001	Daman: A Victim of Marital Violence	Dancer	Hindi	Special appearance in song	
2002	Wrong Number		Odia		
2003	Top Somrat		Bengali	Bangladeshi film	
2004	Adhikar		Bengali		
2004	Barood	Item girl	Bengali	Special appearance in song "Kanta Futeche"	
2004	Tauba Tauba	Rubina	Hindi		
2004	Ab Bas!		Hindi	Special appearance	
2005	Ek Hi Bhool	Tanvi	Hindi		
2005	Jalwa: Fun in Love	Manisha Tripathi / Tanya "Chinky"	Hindi		
2005	Bunty Aur Babli	Dancer	Hindi	Special appearance in song "Bunty Aur Babli"	
2005	Blackmail	Dancer	Hindi		
2005	Bobby: Love and Lust	Bobby D'Costa	Hindi		
2006	Jackpot	Laila	Kannada		
2006	Half Fry Hyderabadi		Hindi		
2007	Love Guru		Hindi		
2007	Kaafila	Niharika	Hindi		
2007	Jagadam	Dancer	Telugu	Special appearance in song "36-24-36"	
2008	Encounter Dayanayak		Kannada		
2008	Money Hai Toh Honey Hai	Manish Sarraf’s wife	Hindi		
2008	Vathiyar		Tamil	Cameo appearance	
2008	Nagaram		Telugu		
2008	Silambattam	Herself	Tamil	Cameo appearance	
2009	Boni	Dancer	Telugu	Special appearance in song	
2010	To The London Calling	Sonia / Urvashi	Hindi		
2010	Ek Chatur Naar		Hindi		
2010	Royal Utsav		Hindi		
2010	Hamilton Palace		Hindi		
2010	Khoobsurat – The Beauty		Hindi		
2010	Meri Life Mein Uski Wife	Dipal	Hindi		
2011	Khubsurat Naukrani		Hindi		
2011	Bablu		Telugu		
2011	Kadhalukku Maranamillai		Tamil		
2012	En Peyar Kumarasamy		Tamil		
2016	Saugandh Chee Maa Baap Na	Kajal	Gujarati		

=== Television ===
Year	Title	Role	Notes	Ref.
2016–2017	Bigg Boss 10	Contestant	6th place	
2017	Nach Baliye 8	Contestant	8th place	
2018–2020	Nazar	Mohana Mehta Rathod		
2019	Kitchen Champion	Contestant		
2020	Nazar 2	Madhulika Chaudhary		
2020–2021	Namak Issk Ka	Iravati Verma		
2021	Ankahee Dastaan: Nazar	Mohana Rathod	Telefilm	
2022	Smart Jodi	Contestant		
2022–2023	Favvara Chowk	Rama		
2023	Bekaboo	Yamini Raichand		
2024	Laal Banarasi	Nayantara Sinha		
2024	Mata Ki Mahima	Indrayani		
2024	Shamshaan Champa	Mohini		
2024–2025	Prem Leela	Rudrakshi		
2025	Jaadu Teri Nazar – Daayan Ka Mausam	Mohana		
2026	The 50	Contestant	Eliminated day 12	

=== Special appearances ===
Year	Title	Role	Ref.
2012	Bigg Boss 6	Herself	
2016	Comedy Nights Bachao	Herself	
2017	Comedy Dangal	Herself	
2019	Divya Drishti	Mohana Mehta Rathod	
2020	Bigg Boss 14	Herself	
2022	Good Night India	Herself	

=== Web series ===
Year	Title	Role	Notes	Ref.
2018	Dupur Thakurpo: 2	Jhuma Boudi		
2020-2022	Ratri Ke Yatri	Prostitute	2 seasons	
2022	Dhappa	Meera	Episode: "Raat Ki Baat"	
2022	Hasratein	Shararat Bai	Episode: "Shararat Bai"	
2023	Bajao	Tanvi Choudhary		
2025	Zindagi Ka U-Turn	Sonam	Microdrama	

== Award and nominations ==
Year	Award	Category	Work	Result	Ref.
2015	Bhojpuri Film Awards	Best Actor – Female	Adalat	Nominated	
2019	Indian Telly Awards	Best Actress in a Negative Role	Nazar	Nominated	

== See also ==
- List of Bhojpuri actresses
