= Hunarbaaz: Desh Ki Shaan =

Indian reality television show

- Genre: Reality; Talent show
- Presented by: Haarsh Limbachiyaa; Bharti Singh; Surbhi Chandna
- Judges: Mithun Chakraborty; Karan Johar; Parineeti Chopra
- Country of origin: India
- Original language: Hindi
- No. of seasons: 1
- No. of episodes: 26

Production
- Production location: Mumbai
- Camera setup: Multi-camera
- Production company: Frames Production

Original release
- Network: Colors TV
- Release: 22 January – 17 April 2022

Related
- Vellum Thiramai

Hunarbaaz: Desh Ki Shaan is an Indian Hindi-language reality television show. Produced by Frames Production, the first episode of Hunarbaaz: Desh Ki Shaan premiered on 22 January 2022. Mithun Chakraborty, Parineeti Chopra and Karan Johar as the judges and Bharti Singh ( later replaced by Surbhi Chandna) and Haarsh Limbachiyaa as the hosts. The First Season was won by Akash Singh.

Hunarbaaz: Desh Ki Shaan follows the format, in which contestants audition in front of three judges and a studio audience. Up until the semifinal and final rounds, the judges decide whether or not a contestant advances in the competition. During the semifinal and final rounds, viewers vote on which contestants will advance.

== Format ==
In contrast to other competition TV shows which feature a cast of celebrity judges, Hunarbaaz features a cast of celebrity experts and considers the viewers the judges. During each performance, the live studio audience is able to decide whether or not a contestant is sent through to the next round by using a voting panels.

While the live studio audience are considered the "judges", the judging panelists also may influence the vote with 10% of the voting power each.

=== Auditions ===
The auditions are the first round where the acts are individually called to perform. With the start of the performance, voters have the option of voting just yes or no. If an expert votes yes, another 10% is added to the tally of the contestant.

Once the contestant reaches 80% of yes votes, the contestant goes to the next round of the competition.

== Overview ==
Season	Episodes	Original Broadcast		Winner	Runner-up
Season	Episodes	First Aired	Last Aired	Winner	Runner-up
1	26	22 January 2022	17 April 2022	Akash Singh	Yo Highness
2	TBA	TBA	TBA	TBA	TBA

== Judges and hosts ==
Judges and hosts	Season 1
Mithun Chakraborty	Judge
Parineeti Chopra	Judge
Karan Johar	Judge
Haarsh Limbachiyaa	Host
Bharti Singh (wbsent for Ep 23–25)	Host
Surbhi Chandna (replaced Bharti for Ep 23–26)	Host

== Season 1 ==
=== Auditions (Episode 1-8) ===
Colour key

Selected in Auditions
Not Selected

Episode	Act No	Name of the Act	Age	Act	City	State	Votes	Judges' Votes			Result	Guests
Episode	Act No	Name of the Act	Age	Act	City	State	Votes	Mithun	Parineeti	Karan	Result	Guests
1	1	Saishree Mallakhamb	12-29	Mallakhamb Group	Ratlam	Madhya Pradesh	85%				Selected	N/A
1	2	Tipu Pehelwaan	35	Weightlifting	Bellary	Karnataka	100%				Selected	N/A
1	3	Ritu Singh	N/A	Dance Act	Varanasi	Uttar Pradesh	23%				Not Selected	N/A
1	5	N/A	12	Aerial Act	N/A	N/A	N/A				Selected	N/A
1	6	N/A	N/A	Weightlifting on nose	N/A	N/A	N/A				Selected	N/A
1	7	Local Company	N/A	Acrobatics Dance Group	N/A	N/A	97%				Selected	N/A
1	8	N/A	N/A	All Boys Bharatanatyam Dance	N/A	N/A	80%				Selected	N/A
1	9	Akash Singh	25	Dance with Acrobatics	Bhagalpur	Bihar	99%				Selected	N/A
1	10	Brijwasi Bros	17-23	Brothers Singing Trio	Mathura	Uttar Pradesh	100%				Selected	Shehnaaz Gill
1	11	Naushad Khan	N/A	Blowing candles with spit	N/A	N/A	54%				Selected	N/A
1	11	Naushad Khan	N/A	Singing	N/A	N/A	84%				Selected	N/A
2	1	Jeevan Kumar	N/A	Rapping Act	Jammu	Jammu and Kashmir	80%				Selected	N/A
2	2	X1X Crew	13-28	Acrobatic Dance Group	Thane	Maharashtra	95%				Selected	N/A
2	3	Bhaijaan	N/A	Hair Plucker Act	N/A	N/A	N/A				Not Selected	N/A
2	4	Naushad Ali	N/A	Dance Act	N/A	N/A	N/A				Not Selected	N/A
2	5	N/A	N/A	All Boys Towel Act	N/A	N/A	N/A				Not Selected	N/A
2	6	N/A	N/A	Painting Act	N/A	N/A	N/A				Not Selected	N/A
2	7	Rohit Thakur as Kavita	N/A	Comedy Act	N/A	N/A	90%				Selected	N/A
2	8	Manoj Jain	N/A	Illusionist & Close-up Magician	N/A	N/A	88%				Selected	N/A
2	9	Shriyanjita Kundu	12	Gymnastics Balance Act	Kolkata	West Bengal	93%				Selected	N/A
2	10	Ankush	N/A	Flexibility Act	N/A	N/A	90%				Selected	N/A
3	1	Ravi & Prashant	26 & 30	Wheel of Death Act	Mumbai	Maharashtra	97%				Selected	N/A
3	2	Anirban Roy	13	Flute Instrumentalist	Kolkata	West Bengal	100%				Selected	Mouni Roy
3	3	N/A	N/A	Gun Shooting Act	N/A	N/A	80%				Selected	N/A
3	4	N/A	N/A	All Female Yoga Act	N/A	N/A	N/A				Selected	N/A
3	5	R G Rathod	37	Comedy + Stunt Act	N/A	N/A	N/A				Selected	N/A
3	6	N/A	N/A	Fusion Singing Duo	Hyderabad	Telangana	N/A				Selected	N/A
3	7	N/A	N/A	Giant Bubbles Act	N/A	N/A	85%				Selected	N/A
3	8	Pran Saika	N/A	Singing + Dance Act	Delhi	Delhi	91%				Selected	N/A
3	9	Shruti & Pramod	18 & 22	Aerial Trapeze Duo	N/A	N/A	97%				Selected	N/A
3	10	Rajesh Kumar	30	Escapist + Illusionist Act	Ludhiana	Punjab	95%				Selected	N/A
3	11	Sudhir Yaduvanshi	27	Singing	N/A	N/A	99%				Selected	N/A
4	1	Rahul & Mukesh	18 & 20	Gymnastics Acrobatics Duo	Sirsa	Haryana	100%				Selected	N/A
4	2	Sukdeb Paul	15	Aerial Act	N/A	N/A	98%				Selected	N/A
4	3	JD Crew	12-29	Haryanvi Folk Dance + Acrobatics Group	Chandigarh	Haryana	84%				Selected	N/A
4	4	Tulas Maruthi	37	Food Eating	N/A	N/A	N/A				Not Selected	N/A
4	5	Cafe	42	Eating Things	N/A	N/A	N/A				Not Selected	N/A
4	6	Roti Man	48	Roti Making Act	N/A	N/A	N/A				Not Selected	N/A
4	7	Karan Chauhan	27	Comedy + Magic Act	Mumbai	Maharashtra	95%				Selected	N/A
4	8	Harsh Kumar	20	Dance Act	N/A	N/A	92%				Selected	N/A
5	1	Aathforon	30+	Housewives Dance Group	Kolkata	West Bengal	89%				Selected	N/A
5	2	Gurjit Singh	24	Singing	N/A	Punjab	86%				Selected	Ankit Gupta (Fateh from Udaariyaan)
5	3	Illuminati Dance Crew	18-26	Dance with LED Screens	Mumbai	Maharashtra	83%				Selected	N/A
5	4	Kuldeep	N/A	Candle Wax + Fire Act	N/A	N/A	N/A				Not Selected	N/A
5	5	N/A	N/A	Weightlifting with ear & eye	N/A	N/A	N/A				Not Selected	N/A
5	6	N/A	N/A	Fire blowing	N/A	N/A	N/A				Not Selected	N/A
5	7	Badri Prasad	33	Strength Performance Act	N/A	N/A	80%				Selected	N/A
5	8	Ravindar	N/A	Hypnotherapist Magician Act	Sonipat	Haryana	80%				Selected	N/A
5	9	Team Velocity	N/A	Semi Classical Dance Group	Mangalore	Karnataka	97%				Selected	N/A
5	10	Akhtar Hindustani	N/A	Poetry Act	Indore	Madhya Pradesh	N/A				Not Selected	Mika Singh
5	11	Rocknaama	20-30	Musical Band + Singing	N/A	N/A	89%				Selected	Mika Singh
6	1	Bamboo Jumping Party	16-33	Bamboo Dance Act	Itanagar	Arunachal Pradesh	97%				Selected	N/A
6	2	Bir Khalsa Group	5-40	Danger Act	Tarn Taran	Punjab	88%				Selected	N/A
6	3	Sanchita & Subrata	16 & 12	Aerobatic Contemporary Duo	Guma	West Bengal	89%				Selected	N/A
6	4	Adnan & Mohd Iqbal Shah	27 & 28	Kashmir Folk Instrumental Act	N/A	Kashmir	85%				Selected	N/A
6	5	Chetan Kumar Bhandari	29	Bhel Chaat	Indore	Madhya Pradesh	80%				Selected	N/A
6	6	Imran Madari	34	Rajasthani Magic Show	Jaisalmer	Rajasthan	90%				Selected	N/A
6	7	Harmony of the Pines	22-42	Police Orchestra Band	Dharamshala	Himachal Pradesh	100%				Selected	N/A
7	1	Yo Highness	15-25	All Girls Hip-Hop Dance Crew	Mumbai	Maharashtra	96%				Selected	N/A
7	2	Javed Khan	29	Close-up Magician	Mumbai	Maharashtra	85%				Selected	N/A
7	3	Shivam Rawat	12	Archery	N/A	N/A	N/A				Selected	N/A
7	4	DJ Aarohi	6	DJ	N/A	N/A	N/A				Selected	N/A
7	5	Niral	10	Flexibility + Yoga	N/A	N/A	N/A				Selected	N/A
7	6	Jinanch	13	Mental Math Calculations	N/A	N/A	91%				Selected	N/A
7	7	N/A	8 & 10	Indian Classic Duo	N/A	N/A	87%				Selected	N/A
7	8	Tripat Singh	77	Strength	N/A	N/A	90%				Selected	N/A
7	9	Dhrampal	44	Unique Teaching Act	N/A	N/A	15%				Not Selected	N/A
7	10	Sanjay Dangre & Cookie	38 & 1	Math Calculating Dog Act	Nagpur	Maharashtra	93%				Selected	N/A
7	11	Saniya Mistri	16	Original Rap	Mumbai	Maharashtra	83%				Selected	N/A
8	1	Yogeshwari Mistry & Manik Paul	25 & 28	Ariel Dance Duo	Chuprijhara	West Bengal	94%				Selected	N/A
8	2	Feel Crew	17-22	Lyrical Dance Group	Mumbai	Maharashtra	84%				Selected	N/A
8	3	Monu Deori	18	Comedy Act	N/A	N/A	N/A				Not Selected	N/A
8	4	Rocky	20	Calisthenics	Delhi	Delhi	87%				Selected	N/A
8	5	Jay Kaithwas	30	Dance Act	Nagpur	Maharashtra	N/A				Selected	N/A
8	6	Eshan Hilal	24	Belly Dance	N/A	N/A	N/A				Selected	N/A
8	7	Aadarsh	26	Mimicry Comedy Act	N/A	N/A	92%				Selected	N/A
8	8	B Unique	18-21	Tuting Animation	Jodhpur	Rajasthan	89%				Selected	N/A
8	9	Bengal Tigers	11-41	Acrobatics Crew	Ratanpur	West Bengal	85%				Selected	N/A

=== Mega Auditions (Episode 9-10) ===
After Mega Auditions, Judges decided to make Top 12 to Top 14 to advance to the next round.

Colour key

Advanced to Top 14
Eliminated

Episode	Act No	Name of the Act	Act	Judges' Votes			Result	Guests
Episode	Act No	Name of the Act	Act	Mithun	Parineeti	Karan	Result	Guests
9	1	Brijwasi Brothers	Brothers Singing Trio				Directly Advanced	N/A
9	2	Illuminati Dance Crew	Dance with Neon Lights & Projection				Advanced	N/A
9	3	X1X Crew	Acrobatic Dance Group				Eliminated	Rohit Shetty
9	4	Akash Singh	Dance with Acrobatics				Directly Advanced	Rohit Shetty
9	Non-Contestant	Ritu Singh	Dance Act				N/A	Rohit Shetty
9	5	Rahul & Mukesh	Gymnastics Acrobatics Duo				Eliminated	Rohit Shetty
9	6	B Unique	Tuting Animation				Advanced	Rohit Shetty
9	7	Yo Highness	All Girls Hip-Hop Dance Crew				Advanced	Rohit Shetty
9	8	Karan Chauhan	Comedy + Magic Act				Advanced	Rohit Shetty
10	1	Harmony of the Pines	Police Orchestra Band				Directly Advanced	Rohit Shetty
10	2	Sanchita & Subrata	Aerobatic Contemporary Duo				Directly Advanced	Rohit Shetty
10	3	Aath Foron	Housewives Dance Group				Advanced	Rohit Shetty
10	4 & 5	Badri Prasad	Strength Performance Act				Eliminated	N/A
10	4 & 5	Tipu Pehelwaan	Strength Performance Act				Directly Advanced	N/A
10	6	Manoj Jain	Illusionist & Close-up Magician				Advanced	N/A
10	7	Rocknaama	Musical Band + Singing				Advanced	N/A
10	8	Yogeshwari Mistry & Manik Paul	Ariel Dance Duo				Advanced	N/A
10	9	Anirban Roy	Flute Instrumentalist				Directly Advanced	N/A
10	N/A	Team Velocity	Semi Classical Dance Group				Eliminated	N/A
10	N/A	Local Company	Acrobatics Dance Group				Eliminated	N/A
10	N/A	Jeevan Kumar	Rapping Act				Eliminated	N/A
10	N/A	Rohit Thakur	Comedy Act				Eliminated	N/A
10	N/A	Bharwas	Instrumental Band				Eliminated	N/A
10	N/A	Sudhir Yaduvanshi	Singing				Eliminated	N/A
10	N/A	Ravindar	Hypnotherapist Magician Act				Eliminated	N/A

=== Grand Premiere with Top 14 (Episode 11-12) ===
This week's Judges' Votes was just an appreciation for the performances. And there was no elimination.

Episode	Act No	Name of the Act	Act	Judges' Votes			Result	Guests	
Episode	Act No	Name of the Act	Act	Mithun	Parineeti	Karan	Result	Guests	
11	1	Brijwasi Brothers	Brothers Singing Trio					Madhuri Dixit	N/A
11	2	Aath Foron	Housewives Dance Group					Madhuri Dixit	Farah Khan
11	3	Akash Singh	Dance with Acrobatics				Best Performance	Madhuri Dixit	Farah Khan
11	4	Anirban Roy	Flute Instrumentalist					Madhuri Dixit	Farah Khan
11	5	Yo Highness	All Girls Hip-Hop Dance Crew					Madhuri Dixit	Farah Khan
11	6	Karan Chauhan	Comedy Magic Act				Best Performance	Madhuri Dixit	Farah Khan
12	7	Illuminati Dance Crew	Dance with Neon Lights & Projection				Best Performance	Farah Khan	
12	8	Harmony of the Pines	Police Orchestra Band				Best Performance	Farah Khan	
12	9	Sanchita & Subrata	Aerobatic Contemporary Duo					Farah Khan	
12	10	Tipu Pehelwaan	Strength Performance Act					Farah Khan	
12	11	Manoj Jain	Illusionist & Close-up Magician				Best Performance	Farah Khan	
12	12	B Unique	Tuting Animation				Best Performance	Farah Khan	
12	13	Rocknaama	Musical Band				Best Performance	Farah Khan	
12	N/A	Yogeshwari Mistry & Manik Paul	Ariel Dance Duo	Didn't perform this week due to injury				Farah Khan	

=== Mother's Special (Episode 13-14) ===
Parineeti Chopra was absent for this week. At the end of all performances, the judges decided to be eliminated two acts.

Colour key

Safe
Danger Zone
Eliminated

Episode	Act No	Name of the Act	Act	Judges' Votes			Result
Episode	Act No	Name of the Act	Act	Mithun	Hema Malini	Karan	Result
13	1	Illuminati Dance Crew	Dance with Neon Lights & Projection				Safe
13	2	Sanchita & Subrata	Aerobatic Contemporary Duo				Safe
13	3	Brijwasi Brothers	Brothers Singing Trio				Danger Zone
13	4	Akash Singh	Dance with Acrobatics				Danger Zone
13	5	Rocknaama	Musical Band				Safe
13	6	Aath Foron	Housewives Dance Group				Eliminated
13	7	Karan Chauhan	Comedy Magic Act				Danger Zone
14	8	Harmony of the Pines	Police Orchestra Band				Safe
14	9	Yo Highness	All Girls Hip-Hop Dance Crew				Safe
14	10	Anirban Roy	Flute Instrumentalist				Safe
14	11	Tipu Pehelwaan	Strength Performance Act				Danger Zone
14	12	Yogeshwari Mistry & Manik Paul	Ariel Dance Duo				Eliminated
14	13	Manoj Jain	Illusionist & Close-up Magician				Danger Zone
14	N/A	B Unique	Tuting Animation	Didn't perform this week due to injury			

=== Blockbuster Weekend (Episode 15) + Holi Special (Episode 16) ===
At the end of all performances, the judges decided to be eliminated three acts.

Colour key

Safe
Danger Zone
Eliminated

Episode	Act No	Name of the Act	Act	Judges' Votes			Result	Guests
Episode	Act No	Name of the Act	Act	Mithun	Parineeti	Karan	Result	Guests
15	1	Akash Singh	Dance with Acrobatics				Safe	N/A
15	2	Yo Highness	All Girls Hip-Hop Dance Crew				Safe	Akshay Kumar & Kriti Sanon
15	3	Tipu Pehelwaan	Strength Performance Act				Eliminated	Akshay Kumar & Kriti Sanon
15	4	B Unique	Tuting Animation				Safe	Akshay Kumar & Kriti Sanon
15	5	Brijwasi Brothers	Brothers Singing Trio				Eliminated	Akshay Kumar & Kriti Sanon
15	6	Illuminati Dance Crew	Dance with Neon Lights & Projection				Eliminated	Akshay Kumar & Kriti Sanon
16	7	Sanchita & Subrata	Aerobatic Contemporary Duo				Safe	Jaya Prada
16	8	Anirban Roy	Flute Instrumentalist				Safe	Jaya Prada
16	9	Harmony of the Pines	Police Orchestra Band				Danger Zone	Jaya Prada
16	10	Manoj Jain	Illusionist & Close-up Magician				Danger Zone	Jaya Prada
16	11	Rocknaama	Musical Band				Danger Zone	Jaya Prada
16	12	Karan Chauhan	Comedy Magic Act				Safe	Jaya Prada

=== Episode 17-18 ===
From this week onwards, the public votes were opened. And based on the public votes & judges scores, one act will be eliminated next week.

Colour key

Safe

Episode	Act No	Name of the Act	Act	Judges' Votes			Result	Guests
Episode	Act No	Name of the Act	Act	Mithun	Parineeti	Karan	Result	Guests
17	1	Yo Highness	All Girls Hip-Hop Dance Crew				Safe	Nora Fatehi
17	2	Akash Singh	Dance with Acrobatics				Safe	Nora Fatehi
17	3	Anirban Roy	Flute Instrumentalist				Safe	Nora Fatehi
17	4	Harmony of the Pines	Police Orchestra Band				Safe	Nora Fatehi
17	5	Manoj Jain	Illusionist & Close-up Magician				Safe	Nora Fatehi
18	6	Rocknaama	Musical Band				Safe	Nora Fatehi
18	7	Sanchita & Subrata	Aerobatic Contemporary Duo				Safe	Nora Fatehi
18	8	Karan Chauhan	Comedy Magic Act				Safe	Nora Fatehi
18	9	B Unique	Tuting Animation				Safe	Nora Fatehi

=== Pari Ka Swayamvar (Episode 19-20) ===
Based on the public votes & judges scores, one act was eliminated.

Colour key

Safe
Danger Zone
Eliminated

Episode	Act No	Name of the Act	Act	Judges' Votes			Result	Guests
Episode	Act No	Name of the Act	Act	Mithun	Parineeti	Karan	Result	Guests
19	1 & 2	Anirban Roy	Flute Instrumentalist				Safe	Kumar Sanu
19	1 & 2	Rocknaama	Musical Band				Safe	Kumar Sanu
19	3 & 4	Akash Singh	Dance with Acrobatics				Safe	Kumar Sanu
19	3 & 4	Sanchita & Subrata	Aerobatic Contemporary Duo				Safe	Kumar Sanu
19	5	Harmony of the Pines	Police Orchestra Band				Danger Zone	Kumar Sanu
19	6	Yo Highness	All Girls Hip-Hop Dance Crew				Safe	Kumar Sanu
19	7	B Unique	Tuting Animation				Safe	Kumar Sanu
19	8	Karan Chauhan	Comedy Magic Act				Eliminated	Kumar Sanu
20	9	Manoj Jain	Illusionist & Close-up Magician				Danger Zone	Kumar Sanu

=== Celebrity Special (Episode 21) + Desh Ki Farmaish (Episode 22) ===
Based on the public votes & judges scores, one act was eliminated.

Colour key

Safe
Eliminated
Wild-Card

Episode	Act No	Name of the Act	Act	Celebrity Partner/Guests	Judges' Votes			Result
Episode	Act No	Name of the Act	Act	Celebrity Partner/Guests	Mithun	Parineeti	Karan	Result
21	1	Rocknaama	Musical Band	Neha Bhasin				Safe
21	2	Sanchita & Subrata	Aerobatic Contemporary Duo	Sanam Johar				Safe
21	3	Anirban Roy	Flute Instrumentalist	Taufiq Qureshi				Safe
21	4	Yo Highness	All Girls Hip-Hop Dance Crew	Priyank Sharma				Safe
21	5	Akash Singh	Dance with Acrobatics	Pratik Utekar				Safe
22	6	Harmony of the Pines	Police Orchestra Band	Captain Shivani Kalra				Safe
22	7	Sukdeb Paul	Aerial Act	none				Challenger (Wild-Card)
22	8	Manoj Jain	Illusionist & Close-up Magician	Somaansh Dangwal & Gunjan Sinha				Safe
22	9	X1X Crew	Acrobatic Dance Group	none				Challenger (Wild-Card)
22	10	B Unique	Tuting Animation	MJ5 Dance Group				Eliminated

=== Semi Finale (Episode 23-24) ===
Based on the public votes & judges scores, two acts was eliminated and the season got the Top 7 acts.

Colour key

Safe
Danger Zone
Eliminated

Episode	Act No	Name of the Act	Act	Judges' Votes			Result	Guests
Episode	Act No	Name of the Act	Act	Mithun	Parineeti	Karan	Result	Guests
23	1	Akash Singh	Dance with Acrobatics				Safe	Geeta Kapoor
23	2	Rocknaama	Musical Band				Safe	Geeta Kapoor
23	3	X1X Crew	Acrobatic Dance Group				Eliminated	Geeta Kapoor
23	4	Sukdeb Paul	Aerial Act				Danger Zone	Geeta Kapoor
23	5	Yo Highness	All Girls Hip-Hop Dance Crew				Safe	Geeta Kapoor
24	6	Harmony of the Pines	Police Orchestra Band				Safe	Geeta Kapoor
24	7	Sanchita & Subrata	Aerobatic Contemporary Duo				Safe	Geeta Kapoor
24	8	Anirban Roy	Flute Instrumentalist				Safe	Geeta Kapoor
24	9	Manoj Jain	Illusionist & Close-up Magician				Eliminated	Geeta Kapoor

=== Pre Finale (Episode 25) ===
No elimination this episode.

Colour key

Safe

Act No	Name of the Act	Act	Celebrity Partner	Judges' Votes			Result
Act No	Name of the Act	Act	Celebrity Partner	Mithun	Parineeti	Karan	Result
1	Akash Singh	Dance with Acrobatics	Tarun Raj Nihalani				Safe
2	Yo Highness	All Girls Hip-Hop Dance Crew	Lauren Gottlieb				Safe
3	Harmony of the Pines	Police Orchestra Band	Divya Kumar				Safe
4	Sanchita & Subrata	Aerobatic Contemporary Duo	Deepak Singh				Safe
5	Sukdeb Paul	Aerial Act	Rupesh Bane				Safe
6 & 7	Rocknaama	Musical Band	Special Orchestra				Safe
6 & 7	Anirban Roy	Flute Instrumentalist	Special Orchestra				Safe

=== Grand Finale (Episode 26) ===
Based on the public votes & judges scores, the Top 7 acts.

Colour key

Winner
Runner-up
Finalist

Act No	Name of the Act	Act	Final Result	Guests
1	Akash Singh	Dance with Acrobatics	Winner	Karan Kundrra, Nora Fatehi, Neetu Singh and Marzi Pestonji
2	Yo Highness	All Girls Hip-Hop Dance Crew	Runner-up	Karan Kundrra, Nora Fatehi, Neetu Singh and Marzi Pestonji
3	Anirban Roy	Flute Instrumentalist	Finalist	Karan Kundrra, Nora Fatehi, Neetu Singh and Marzi Pestonji
4	Harmony of the Pines	Police Orchestra Band	Finalist	Karan Kundrra, Nora Fatehi, Neetu Singh and Marzi Pestonji
5	Sanchita & Subrata	Aerobatic Contemporary Duo	Finalist	Karan Kundrra, Nora Fatehi, Neetu Singh and Marzi Pestonji
6	Rocknaama	Musical Band	Finalist	Karan Kundrra, Nora Fatehi, Neetu Singh and Marzi Pestonji
7	Sukdeb Paul	Aerial Act	Finalist	Karan Kundrra, Nora Fatehi, Neetu Singh and Marzi Pestonji

=== Guests ===
Episode	Date	Guests	Notes
5	5 Feb 2022	Mika Singh, DJ Sumit Sethi & Laxmi Rai	To promote their new song
6	6 Feb 2022	Sarvam Patel	Sand Art Performance to give tribute to late Lata Mangeshkar
9 & 10	19 Feb 2022 & 20 Feb 2022	Rohit Shetty	Special judge at Mega Audition
11	26 Feb 2022	Madhuri Dixit, Sanjay Kapoor, Manav Kaul	To promote their new series The Fame Game
11 & 12	26 Feb 2022 & 27 Feb 2022	Farah Khan	Guest Judge for Grand Premiere
13 & 14	5 Mar 2022 & 6 Mar 2022	Hema Malini	Guest Judge for Mother's Special
15	12 Mar 2022	Akshay Kumar and Kriti Sanon	To promote their film Bachchhan Paandey
16	13 Mar 2022	Jaya Prada	Guest for Holi Special
17 & 18	19 Mar 2022 & 20 Mar 2022	Nora Fatehi	Special Guest Judge
19 & 20	26 Mar 2022 & 27 Mar 2022	Kumar Sanu	Special Guest Judge
19 & 20	26 Mar 2022 & 27 Mar 2022	Gaurav Dubey, Arjit Taneja, Vishal Aditya Singh, Shivin Narang	Parineeti Ka Swayamvar
23 & 24	9 Apr 2022 & 10 Apr 2022	Geeta Kapoor	Special Guest Judge
24	10 Apr 2022	Abhishek Bachchan, Yami Gautam and Nimrat Kaur	To promote their film Dasvi
26	17 Apr 2022	Karan Kundrra, Nora Fatehi, Neetu Singh and Marzi Pestonji	To promote Dance Deewane Junior
