= Bharti Singh =

Indian comedian and actress (born 1984)

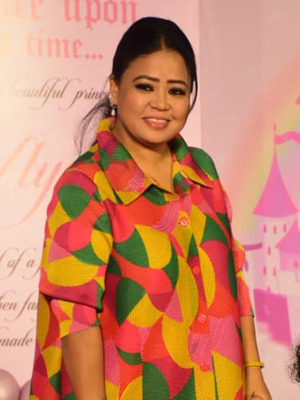
- Singh in 2023
- Born: 3 July 1984 (age 42); Amritsar, Punjab, India
- Other name: Bharti Singh Limbachiyaa
- Occupations: Actress; comedian
- Years active: 2008–present
- Spouse: Haarsh Limbachiyaa (m. 2017)
- Children: 2
- Notable work: Comedy Circus; Comedy Nights Bachao; The Kapil Sharma Show; Khatra Khatra Khatra

Comedy career
- Medium: Stand-up; television; film
- Genres: character comedy; insult comedy; satire
- Subjects: Bollywood; everyday life; Indian culture; popular culture

Bharti Singh (born 3 July 1984) is an Indian comedian, actress, host and television personality primarily works in Hindi cinema. She has participated in the reality shows Jhalak Dikhhla Jaa 5 (2012), Nach Baliye 8 (2017), and Fear Factor: Khatron Ke Khiladi 9 (2019). In 2019, she appeared on Khatra Khatra Khatra, a show conceptualised by her with husband Haarsh Limbachiyaa for Colors TV. Since 2016, Singh has appeared in Forbes India's celebrity 100 list.

== Early life ==
Bharti was born on 3 July 1984 in Amritsar, Punjab, to a Punjabi family. Both of Singh's parents are from Punjab, with her father having ancestry from Nepal. Her father died when she was two years old. Singh has two older siblings, a brother and a sister. She is a graduate of the BBK DAV College for Women, Amritsar.

== Career ==
Bharti was the second runner-up in the stand-up comedy reality series The Great Indian Laughter Challenge on STAR One, where she received critical acclaim for her child character named Lalli. She then appeared as a contestant on Comedy Circus. She co-hosted the show Comedy Nights Bachao with Krishna Abhishek.

In 2011, she acted in the TV series Pyaar Mein Twist on STAR Plus, and later appeared as a contestant on the 2012 celebrity dance reality show Jhalak Dikhhla Jaa 5. In 2012, she hosted the television show Sau Saal Cinema Ke, which premiered on Star Plus, alongside Karan Tacker, Ragini Khanna and Shruti Ulfat. She also appeared as a guest on MasterChef India.

From 2014 through 2016, she hosted seasons 5 through 7 of India's Got Talent. In 2017, she participated in Nach Baliye 8 on Star Plus alongside Haarsh Limbachiyaa, and finished in sixth place. In 2018, she appeared as a guest on the reality shows Dance Deewane and Bigg Boss 12, both on Colors TV. In the same year, she returned to host India's Got Talent 8, and appeared on the comedy show The Kapil Sharma Show on Sony TV as Titli Yadav. In 2019, she participated in Fear Factor: Khatron Ke Khiladi 9 on Colors TV along with Haarsh Limbachiyaa.

In 2020, Bharti hosted Sony TV's India's Best Dancer and Colors TV's Hum Tum Aur Quarantine along with Haarsh Limbachiyaa. She also participated in Fear Factor: Khatron Ke Khiladi – Made in India and emerged as the fourth runner-up.

In 2022, she hosted Colors TV's show Hunarbaaz: Desh Ki Shaan, along with Haarsh Limbachiyaa.

In 2024, she hosted Colors TV's show called Laughter Chef which gained great popularity among audience.

== Personal life ==
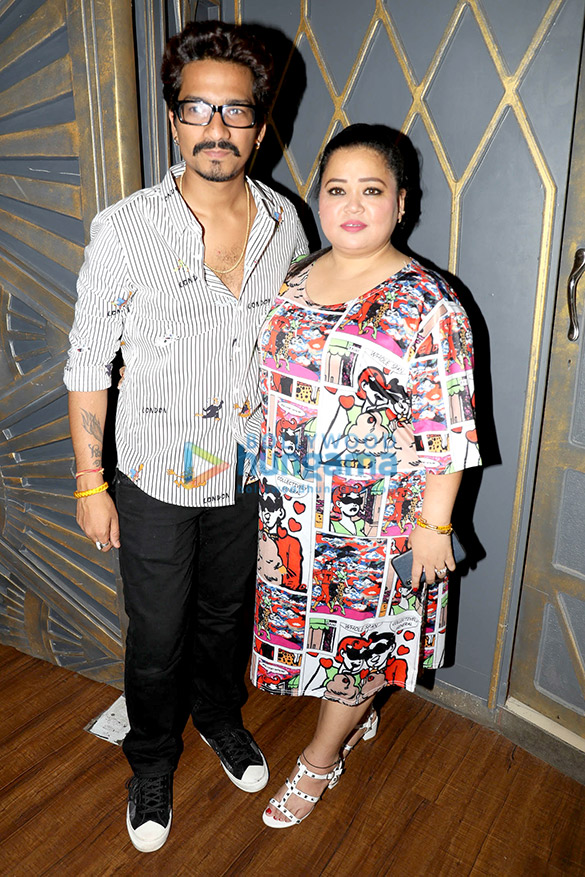
Singh with her husband Haarsh Limbachiyaa

On 3 December 2017, Singh married writer Haarsh Limbachiyaa after they dated for few years.

Singh has been nationally ranked in archery and pistol shooting.

On 21 November 2020, the Narcotics Control Bureau conducted a search at Bharti's residence and recovered 86.5 g of cannabis. She and her husband were taken in for questioning and they were later arrested by the bureau. They were granted bail on 23 November 2020, after two days of interrogation.

On 3 April 2022, the couple had their first child, a boy named Laksh Singh Limbaachiya, They had their second child, again a boy on 19 December 2025 and named him Yashveer.

== Filmography ==
=== Films ===
Year	Title	Role	Language
2011	Ek Noor		Punjabi
2012	Yamle Jatt Yamle		Punjabi
2012	Khiladi 786	Milli	Hindi
2013	Jatt & Juliet 2	Preet / Fake Pooja	Punjabi
2013	Rangan Style		Kannada
2014	Mundeyan Ton Bachke Rahin		Punjabi
2016	Sanam Re	Babyji	Hindi
2023	Rocky Aur Rani Kii Prem Kahaani	Pushpa	Hindi

=== Television ===
Year	Title	Role	Notes	Ref.
2008	The Great Indian Laughter Challenge	Contestant	2nd runner-up	
2009-2013	Comedy Circus	Contestant		
2010	Adaalat	Aarti Sinha		
2012	Jhalak Dikhhla Jaa 5	Contestant	5th place	
2012	F.I.R.	SP Kamsin Aaha		
2014	India's Got Talent	Host		
2014	Gangs of Haseepur	Contestant		
2014–2016	Comedy Classes	Dancing Teacher Bharti		
2015–2017	Comedy Nights Bachao	Host		
2015	I Can Do That	Contestant		
2016	Comedy Nights Live	Chintu Sharma		
2016	Box Cricket League 2	Contestant		
2016	India's Got Talent 7	Host		
2017	Nach Baliye 8	Contestant	7th place	
2017	Bittu Bak Bak	Bittu		
2017–2022	The Kapil Sharma Show	Various		
2017	Comedy Dangal	Judge		
2018	India's Got Talent season 8	Host		
2019	India's Best Dancer	Host		
2019	Khatron Ke Khiladi 9	Contestant	6th place	
2019	Bharti Ka Show - Ana Hi Padega	Host		
2019	Khatra Khatra Khatra	Host		
2020	Hum Tum Aur Quarantine	Host		
2020	Khatron Ke Khiladi: Made in India	Contestant	4th place	
2020–2021	Funhit Mein Jaari	Various		
2021–2024	Dance Deewane	Host	Season 3–4	
2021–2022	Indian Game Show	Host		
2022	Hunarbaaz: Desh Ki Shaan	Host		
2022	Sa Re Ga Ma Pa Li'l Champs 2022	Host		
2022–2023	Favvara Chowk	Favvara Devi		
2024–2026	Laughter Chefs – Unlimited Entertainment	Host	Season 1–3	
2026–present	Indian Game Show	Host		

==== Special appearances ====
Year	Title	Role	Ref.
2012	Bigg Boss 6	Herself	
2013	Bigg Boss 7	Herself	
2013	Nach Baliye 5	Herself	
2013	Nach Baliye 6	Herself	
2013	Baal Veer	Herself	
2013	Jhalak Dikhhla Jaa 6	Herself	
2014	Jhalak Dikhhla Jaa 7	Herself	
2014	Dil Se Naachein Indiawaale	Herself	
2015	Fear Factor: Khatron Ke Khiladi 6	Herself	
2015	Jhalak Dikhhla Jaa 8	Herself	
2016	Bigg Boss 9	Herself	
2016	Fear Factor: Khatron Ke Khiladi 7	Herself	
2016	Bigg Boss 10	Herself	
2017	Aadat Se Majboor	Herself	
2017	Lip Sing Battle	Herself	
2018	Dance Deewane	Herself	
2018	Bigg Boss 12	Herself	
2019	Super Dancer	Herself	
2019	Kitchen Champion 5	Herself	
2019	Hasdeyan De Ghar Vasde	Herself	
2020	Dance Deewane 2	Herself	
2020	Fear Factor: Khatron Ke Khiladi 10	Herself	
2021	Bigg Boss 14	Herself	
2021	Fear Factor: Khatron Ke Khiladi 11	Herself	
2021	Bigg Boss OTT	Herself	
2021	Bigg Boss 15	Herself	
2021	Sirf Tum	Herself	
2021	The Big Picture	Herself	
2022	The Khatra Khatra Show	Herself	
2022	Ravivaar With Star Parivaar	Herself	
2022	Saavi Ki Savaari - Ganesh Utsav	Herself	
2023	Entertainment Ki Raat Housefull	Herself	
2023	Bigg Boss 17	Herself	
2024	Khatron Ke Khiladi 14	Herself	
2024	Bigg Boss 18	Herself	

== Awards ==
Year	Award	Category	TV show
2012	Indian Television Academy Awards	Best Actress in a Comic Role	Comedy Circus Ke Ajoobe
2012	People's Choice Awards	Favorite Actress – Comedy	Kahani Comedy Circus Ki
2014	Indian Telly Awards	Best Actress in a Comic Role (Jury)	Comedy Circus Ke Mahabali
2019	Indian Telly Awards	Entertainer of the Year	Special Award
2019	Nickelodeon Kids' Choice Awards	Favorite Actress – TV	The Khatra Show
2019	Indian Television Academy Awards	Best Actress in a Comic Role	The Kapil Sharma Show
2021	Indian Television Academy Awards	Best Actress in a Comic Role (Popular)	The Kapil Sharma Show
2022	Indian Television Academy Awards	Best Actress in a Comic Role (Popular)	The Kapil Sharma Show
2022	Nickelodeon Kids' Choice Awards	Favorite TV Actress	
2022	Talent Track Awards	Viral Sensation of the Year	
2023	Indian Television Academy Awards	Best Actress in a Comic Role (Popular)	Favvara Chowk
2025	Indian Telly Awards	Entertainment Personality of the Year	Editorial Choice Award
