= Haarsh Limbachiyaa =

Indian screenwriter, television producer, television host (born 1986)

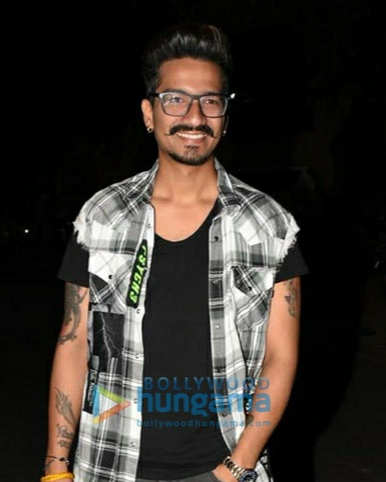
- Haarsh in 2021
- Born: Hemant Kumar Limbachiya; 30 January 1987 (age 39); Mumbai, Maharashtra, India
- Occupations: Screenwriter; television producer; television host
- Years active: 2011–present
- Known for: Khatra Khatra Khatra; Fear Factor: Khatron Ke Khiladi 9
- Spouse: Bharti Singh (m. 2017)
- Children: 2

Hemant Kumar "Haarsh" Limbachiya (born 30 January 1987) is an Indian screenwriter, producer, and television host. He has written for the shows Comedy Circus, Comedy Nights Bachao, and Comedy Nights Live. He also wrote dialogues for the film PM Narendra Modi and lyrics for the title-track of the film Malang. He has created, produced, and hosted television shows like Khatra Khatra Khatra and Hum Tum Aur Quarantine, along with his wife Bharti Singh.

== Personal life ==
Haarsh married comedian Bharti Singh on 3 December 2017. In the same year, he founded his production company, H3 Productions.

On 22 November 2020, the Narcotics Control Bureau arrested Haarsh Limbachiyaa and his wife Bharti Singh after a search was conducted in which 86.5 gms of Cannabis was found and seized. He was later arrested after 15 hours of questioning by anti-drugs agency NCB.

On 3 April 2022, the couple had their first child, a boy, Laksh Limbachiyaa nicknamed Golla.

== Filmography ==
=== Films ===
Year	Title	Role	Notes	Ref.
2019	PM Narendra Modi	N/A	Dialogue writer	
2020	Malang	N/A	Lyricist	
2023	Rocky Aur Rani Kii Prem Kahaani	Ravi	Cameo appearance	

=== Television ===
Year	Title	Role	Notes	Ref.
2009-2014	Lapataganj		Writer	
2011	Comedy Circus	N/A	Writer	
2015	Comedy Nights Bachao	N/A	Writer	
2016	Comedy Nights Live	N/A	Writer	
2017	Nach Baliye	Contestant	7th place	
2019	Khatron Ke Khiladi 9	Contestant	10th place	
2019	Khatra Khatra Khatra	Host	Producer and writer	
2020	India's Best Dancer	Host		
2020	Hum Tum Aur Quarantine	Host	Producer and writer	
2020	Khatron Ke Khiladi: Made in India	Contestant	7th place	
2020	Funhit Mein Jaari	N/A	Producer and writer	
2021	Dance Deewane	Host		
2022	Hunarbaaz: Desh Ki Shaan	Host		
2022–2023	Favvara Chowk	Pappi Faraar		20
2023	Entertainment Ki Raat Housefull	Host		
2024	Superstar Singer	Host		
2024-Present	Champions Ka Tashan- IBD v/s SD	Host		
2024-2026	India's Got Latent	Guest		
2025	India's Got Talent 11	Host		
2026 –	Indian Game Show	Host		

==== Special appearances ====
Year	Title	Role	Ref.
2019	Dance Deewane 2	Himself	
2019	Bigg Boss 13	Himself	
2020	Fear Factor: Khatron Ke Khiladi 10	Himself	
2020	Bigg Boss 14	Himself	
2021	Fear Factor: Khatron Ke Khiladi 11	Himself	
2021	Sirf Tum	Himself	
2021	The Big Picture	Himself	
2023	Bigg Boss 17	Himself	
