= Mohit Kumar (actor) =

Indian actor

- Born: 21 July 1995 (age 31); Bhiwani, Haryana, India
- Education: Institute of Technology and Sciences, Bhiwani
- Occupations: Actor, model
- Years active: 2020–present
- Notable work: Ek Duje Ke Vaaste 2 Sab Satrangi; Vanshaj

Mohit Kumar (born 21 July 1995) is an Indian television actor and model who works predominantly in Hindi television. He is best known for his portrayal of Major Shravan Malhotra in Ek Duje Ke Vaaste 2, Mankamneshwar in Sab Satrangi and notably as Neil Bharadwaj, the male lead. in Vanshaj. He has also actively worked in web series, with the most recent one titled Wrong Number Reboot, starring alongside Kanikka Kapur.

== Career ==
Mohit made his television debut in 2020 with Sony TV 's Ek Duje Ke Vaaste 2 where he portrayed the role of Major Shravan Malhotra opposite Kanikka Kapur.

In 2020, he portrayed Mankamneshwar in Sony SAB 's Sab Satrangi.

From June 2023 to August 2024, he portrayed the character of Neil Bharadwaj in Sony SAB 's Vanshaj opposite Anjali Tatrari.

== Filmography ==
=== Television ===
Year	Serial	Role	Notes	Ref.
2020–2021	Ek Duje Ke Vaaste 2	Major Shravan Malhotra	Debut show Lead role	
2022	Sab Satrangi	Mankamneshwar Maurya	Lead Role	
2023–2024	Vanshaj	Neel Bharadwaj	Lead Role	

=== Web series ===
Year	Webseries	Role	Platform	Ref.
2022	The Diwali Proposal	Vicky	YouTube	
2022	Sarkari Shaadi	Mayank	YouTube	
2023	When English Medium & Hindi Medium Are Neighbours	Kishan	YouTube	
2024	When Introvert Dates Extrovert	Prateek	YouTube	
2024	When Doctor & Dentist are Neighbours	Armaan	YouTube	
2024	North Indian & South Indian Are Colleagues	Prakash	YouTube	
2024	When Alpha Male & Feminist Girl Are Neighbours	Ranjit	YouTube	
2024	Wrong Number Reboot	Mihir	YouTube	

=== Music videos ===
Year	Title	Singer(s)	Ref.
2021	Pyar Karke	Aishwarya Pandit	
2022	Kitna Haseen Hai Yeh Sama	G. Srinivas	
