= UP65 =

2023 comedy drama series

- Genre: Drama; Comedy
- Created by: Nikhil Sachan
- Written by: Nikhil Sachan
- Directed by: Gaganjeet Singh
- Starring: Shine Pandey; Pragati Mishra; Abbas Ali Ghaznavi; Jay Thakkar; Priitamm Jaiswal; Ria Nalavade; Anmol Jyotir; Abhishek Reddy; Chunmun Kumar
- Country of origin: India
- Original language: Hindi
- No. of seasons: 1
- No. of episodes: 27

Original release
- Network: Jio TV
- Release: 8 June 2023

UP65 is a Hindi comedy-drama series that debuted on Jio TV on 8 June 2023. Directed by Gaganjeet Singh, the show is based on the novel of the same name by Nikhil Sachan. The cast includes Shine Pandey, Pragati Mishra, Abbas Ali Ghaznavi, Jay Thakkar, Priitamm Jaiswal, Ria Nalavade, Anmol Jyotir, Abhishek Reddy, and Chunmun Kumar. Set in Varanasi, the series follows engineering students and their friendships, dreams, and struggles.

== Plot summary ==
The story follows a group of engineering students from different backgrounds, focusing on Nishant (Shine Pandey), a serious student. He tries to balance his academic life with the carefree lifestyle of his hostel mates, who enjoy having fun and going out, but eventually, they pull him into their world.

== Cast and characters ==
- Shine Pandey as Nishant
- Pragati Mishra as Shubhra
- Abbas Ali Ghaznavi as Prasad
- Jay Thakkar as Mohit
- Priitamm Jaiswal as Pandey
- Ria Nalavade as Antari
- Anmol Jyotir as Akhil
- Abhishek Reddy as Pablo
- Chunmun Kumar as Librarian

== Critical reception ==
Archika Khurana reviewed UP65 for the Times of India and rated it 2 stars out of 5. She noted "While there is no doubt that the topic has potential and has been explored earlier, its execution fell short when compared to series such as ‘Kota Factory’ and others that focus on the day-to-day lives of engineering students. ‘UP65’ struggles to stand out in the genre, offering little in the way of novelty or a unique storyline."

Palak Shukla of Amar Ujala gave a harsher critique, rating the series 1.5 stars out of 5. Shukla described it as "A ridiculous web series based on hostel life, a blot on the name of BHU IIT."
