= Vidhi Pandya =

Indian television actress

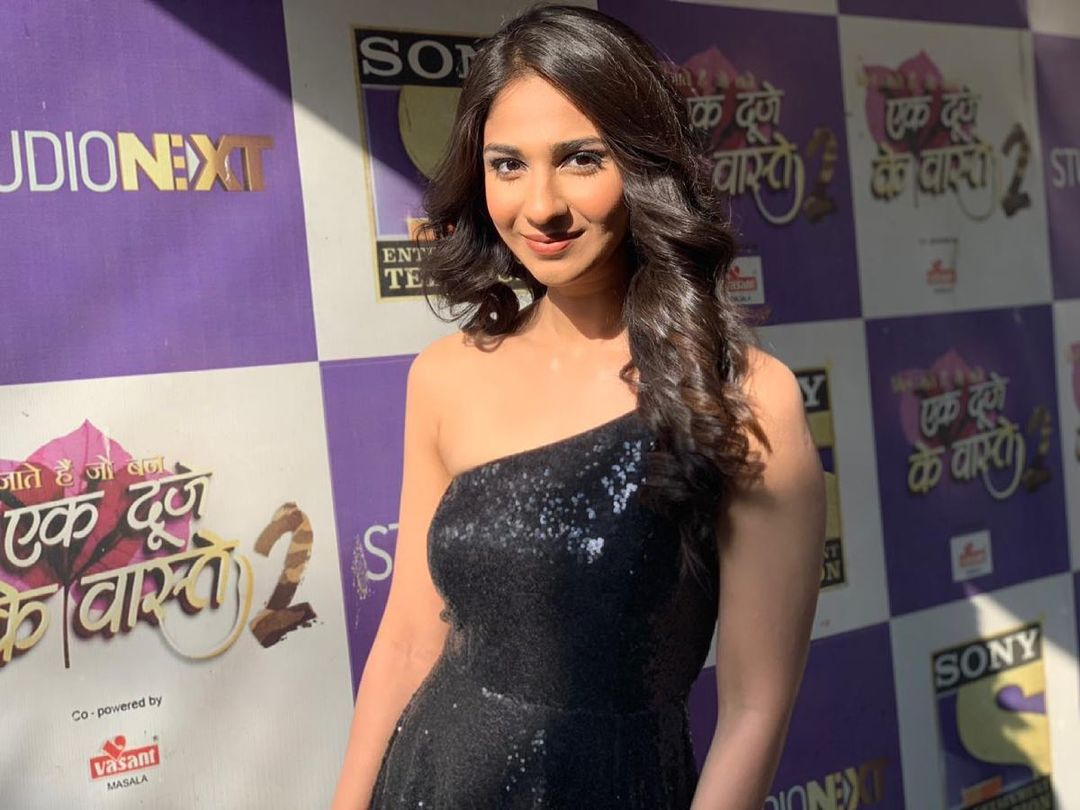
- Pandya in 2021
- Occupation: Actress
- Years active: 2014–2022
- Known for: Udaan; Ek Duje Ke Vaaste 2 Bigg Boss 15; Mose Chhal Kiye Jaaye

Vidhi Pandya is an Indian actress who works in Hindi television. She made her acting debut in 2014 with Tum Aise Hi Rehna portraying Kiran Mehra. Pandya is best known for her portrayal of Imli Singh Rajvanshi in Udaan, Suman Tiwari Malhotra in Ek Duje Ke Vaaste 2 and Saumya Verma in Mose Chhal Kiye Jaaye. In October 2021, she participated in Bigg Boss Season 15.

== Career ==
Pandya made her acting debut in 2014 with Tum Aise Hi Rehna portraying Kiran Maheshwari. She then portrayed Nidhi in Balika Vadhu from 2015 to 2016. In 2015, she played Rohini Singh / Sophia in various episodes of Crime Patrol.

From 2016 to 2019, Pandya portrayed Imli Singh Rajvanshi in Udaan opposite Paras Arora and Vikas Bhalla, which proved as a major turning point in her career.

She then appeared in an episode of Kitchen Champion in 2019. The same year, she played Rani in an episode of Laal Ishq as Rani alongside Saheem Khan and Mehnaz Shroff.

Pandya in 2021 portrayed Major Dr. Suman Tiwari Malhotra in Ek Duje Ke Vaaste 2 opposite Mohit Kumar.

In 2022, she portrayed the role of Saumya Verma in Mose Chhal Kiye Jaaye opposite Vijayendra Kumeria.

== Television ==
Year	Title	Role	Notes	Ref.
2013	Khelti Hai Zindagi Aankh Micholi	Ayesha		
2014	Tum Aise Hi Rehna	Kiran Maheshwari		
2015–2016	Balika Vadhu	Nidhi		
2015	Crime Patrol	Rohini Singh / Sophia		
2016–2019	Udaan	Imli Singh Rajvanshi		
2019	Kitchen Champion	Herself	Guest appearance	
2019	Laal Ishq	Rani	Episode: "Icchadhari Mendhak"	
2021	Ek Duje Ke Vaaste 2	Major Dr. Suman Tiwari Malhotra	Episodes 156 through 218	
2021	Bigg Boss 15	Contestant	23rd place	
2022	Mose Chhal Kiye Jaaye	Saumya Verma / Saumya Armaan Oberoi		

== Awards and nominations ==
Year	Award	Category	Work	Result	Ref.
2022	Indian Television Academy Awards	Popular Actress (Drama)	Mose Chhal Kiye Jaaye	Pending	
