= Vanshaj =

Indian drama television series

- Genre: Family drama
- Created by: Siddharth Kumar Tewary
- Written by: Shobhit Jaiswal; Sameer Mishra; Rishabh Sharma
- Starring: See below
- Country of origin: India
- Original language: Hindi
- No. of episodes: 408

Production
- Camera setup: Multi-camera
- Running time: 20–25 minutes
- Production company: Swastik Pictures

Original release
- Network: Sony SAB
- Release: 12 June 2023 – 28 September 2024

Vanshaj (transl. Descendant) is an Indian family drama series that aired from 12 June 2023 to 28 September 2024 on Sony SAB and streams digitally on Sony LIV. Produced by Siddharth Kumar Tewary under Swastik Productions, it starred Anjali Tatrari, Mahir Pandhi, Puneet Issar, Mohit Kumar and Parinita Seth in main roles.

== Synopsis ==
Yuvika, a talented young woman, clashes with her cousin Digvijay, a talented, aimless and an egoistic young man over the inheritance of the family business for determining the successor based on their competence.

== Cast ==
=== Main ===
- Anjali Tatrari as:
  - Yuvika "Yuvi" Premraj Mahajan alias Yukti Multani: A Business woman and heir of Mahajan Empire; Prem and Bhumi's daughter; Isha and Arjun's sister; Digvijay's cousin and arch rival; Kartik's ex-fiancée and late Neel's fiancée; Yash's business rival-turned-love-interest (2023–2024)
  - Chinki Kaur Arora: Yuvika's look alike; Digvijay's aid (2024)
- Mahir Pandhi as Digvijay "DJ" Mahajan: Dhanraj and Gargi's son; Miraya's brother; Yuvika's cousin; Ruhi's ex-husband; Yugvijay's father (2023–2024)
- Puneet Issar as Bhanupratap Mahajan a.k.a. Dada Babu: The Patriarch of the Mahajan family; Dhanraj and Premraj's eldest half-brother and father-figure; Yuvika, Isha, Arjun, Miraya, Shanaya and DJ's uncle; Yugvijay's grand-uncle (2023–2024)
- Mohit Kumar as Neel Bharadwaj: Vidur and Janki's son; Kabeer's collegemate and junior; Yuvika's late fiancé (2023–2024)
- Shaleen Malhotra as Yash Shalini Talwar: Shalini's son; Sia's brother; Amarjeet's nephew; Yuvika's business rival (2024)

=== Recurring ===
- Kavita Kapoor as Shobhana Mahajan: Shanti Prasad's second wife; Dhanraj and Subhadra's mother; Premraj's murderer; DJ, Shanaya and Miraya's grandmother (2023)
- Leena Balodi as Devyani Verma: Shanti Prasad's mistress; Premraj's biological mother; Yuvika, Isha and Arjun's grandmother (2023)
- Gireesh Sahdev as Dhanraj Mahajan: Shanti Prasad and Shobhana's son; Gargi's husband; Digvijay and Miraya's father (2023–2024)
- Parinita Seth as Gargi Mahajan: Dhanraj's wife; Digvijay and Miraya's mother (2023–2024)
- Akshay Anand as Premraj "Prem" Mahajan: Former CEO and the heir of Mahajan Family; Shanti Prasad and Devyani's illegitimate son; Bhumi's husband; Shalini's ex-fiancee; Yuvika, Arjun and Isha's father (2023; 2024)
- Gurdeep Kohli as Bhoomi Mahajan: Premraj's wife; Yuvika, Isha and Arjun's mother (2023–2024)
- Buneet Kapoor as Arjun Mahajan: A swimmer; Prem and Bhumi's son; Isha and Yuvika's brother (2023–2024)
- Kanchan Dubey as Isha "Ishu" Mahajan: A fashionista; Prem and Bhumi's daughter; Yuvika and Arjun's sister; Akshat's love-interest (2023–2024)
- Aliraza Namdar as Vidur Bharadwaj: The legal advisor of Mahajans; Prem's friend; Bhumi's brother-figure; Neel's father (2023–2024)
- Sheena Bajaj as Ruhi Shroff (formerly Mahajan): Digvijay's ex-wife; Yugvijay's mother (2023–2024)
- Mamata Verma as Shubhadra Mahajan: Shanti Prasad and Shobhana's daughter; Shanaya's mother (2023–2024)
- Prerna Singh Khawas as Miraya Mahajan: Dhanraj and Gargi's daughter; DJ's sister; Nikhil's widow (2023)
  - Gitanjali Mangal replaced Khawas as Miraya (2024)
- Aarzoo Bathla as Shanaya: Subhadra's daughter (2023)
- Praneet Bhat as Yogi Singh: The journalist who helps Yuvika (2023–2024)
- Harveer Singh as Diamond Singh: Mahajan's former househelp (2023–2024)
- Zaan Khan as Kartik: Yuvika's childhood friend and ex-fiancé (2023)
- Sheetal Tiwari as Simone Kalre: Digvijay's girlfriend (2023–2024)
- Shweta Dadhich as Avni D'Souza: Prem's sister-figure (2023)
- Prakash Ramchandani as Mr. Shroff: Ruhi's father and board member in Mahajans Group of Industries (2023)
- Sarwar Ahuja as Kabeer Oberoi: Bhumi's fake son; Neel's collegemate and senior (2023–2024)
- Nisha Nagpal as Koyal Verma: Shristi's daughter; Digvijay's former fiancee (2024)
- Priti Narnaware as Rose: Yuvika's right hand (2024)
- Utkarsha Naik as Srishti Verma: Koyal's mother (2024)
- Sriju Tripathi as Baby Yugvijay "UJ" Mahajan: Ruhi and Digvijay's son (2024)
- Behzad Khan as Vikram Multani: Prem's friend; Yuvika's adopted father (2024)
- Gurpreet Singh as Rafeek Beg (2024)
- Aryan Arora as Nikhil: Miraya's late husband (2024)
- Meenal Kapoor as Gulrez Aapa: Yuvika's sister-figure whom she met in prison (2024)
- Sudesh Berry as Amarjeet Talwar: Bhanu's former childhood friend turned enemy; Shalini's elder brother; Akshat's father; Yash's uncle; Sia's adoptive uncle (2024)
- Mona Vasu as Shalini Talwar: Prem's ex-fiancee; Amar's sister; Yash's mother; Sia's adoptive mother (2024)
- Jinal Jain as Sia Talwar: Shalini's adopted daughter; Yash's sister (2024)
- Sahib Singh Lamba as Akshat Talwar: Amar's son; Yash's cousin; Sia's adoptive cousin; Isha's love-interest (2024)

=== Guest ===
- Gulki Joshi as S.H.O. Haseena Malik from Maddam Sir (2023)

== Production ==
=== Filming ===
The filming of the series began in May 2023 in Rishikesh.

== Crossover ==
From October to November 2023, Gulki Joshi from Maddam Sir appeared as a guest reprising the role of Haseena Malik.
