= Sab Satrangi =

2022 Indian TV series

- Genre: Slice of life Romantic comedy
- Starring: Mohit Kumar; Kangan Nangia; Joyoshree Arora; Daya Shankar Pandey
- Country of origin: India
- Original language: Hindi
- No. of episodes: 120

Production
- Producer: Saurabh Tiwari
- Running time: 20–22 minutes
- Production company: Parin Multimedia

Original release
- Network: Sony SAB
- Release: 7 February – 25 June 2022

Sab Satrangi (transl. Everything Colorful) is a Hindi-language slice of life comedy television series produced by Saurabh Tiwari under the banner Parin Multimedia. It aired on Sony SAB from 7 February 2022 to 25 June 2022.

== Plot ==
Set in Lucknow, Uttar Pradesh, the show revolves around Mankameshwar "Manu" Maurya and his colourful family. Manu is honest, sincere, hardworking and noble person and is a believer in his grandmother's philosophy: "If you haven't done anything wrong to anyone, then nothing wrong would happen to you either."

Manu marries Shweta, as arranged by his family. The festive atmosphere turns sour as Shweta elopes soon after the wedding, leaving behind a letter in which she falsely accuses the Maurya family of asking for a dowry. (Shweta is involved in an affair with her boyfriend). A police inspector bribed by Shweta arrests Manu. After Manu's innocence is proven and he is released, his manager fires him from his job. Dejected but still hopeful, Manu decides to re-open 'Jai Mataji Tenthouse', which was owned by his grandfather and closed abruptly after his death.

== Cast ==
=== Main ===
- Mohit Kumar as Mankameshwar "Manu" Maurya:
  - Narmada and Shyamlal's son; Banphool's grandson; Kanaklata, Deepu and Shikha's brother; Gargi's husband. (2022)
    - Lala Dalpatrai Maurya: Manu's grandfather (2022)
- Kangan Baruah Nangia as Gargi Maurya:
  - Khushwa's daughter; Manu's wife (2022)

=== Recurring ===
- Joyoshree Arora as Banphool Maurya:
  - Lala's widow; Manu's grandmother; Shyamlal's mother; Kanaklata, Deepu, Manu and Shikha's grandmother (2022)
- Dayashankar Pandey as Shyamlal Maurya:
  - Lala and Banphool's son; Narmada's widower; Kanaklata, Deepu, Manu and Shikha's father (2022)
- Hima Singh as Kanaklata:
  - Narmada and Shyamlal's daughter; Lala and Banphool's granddaughter; Deepu, Manu and Shikha's sister; Diwakar's wife (2022)
    - Mohit Sharma as Diwakar: Kanaklata's husband (2022)
- Puru Chibber as Deependra "Deepu" Maurya:
  - Narmada and Shyamlal's son; Lala and Banphool's grandson; Kanaklata, Manu and Shikha's brother; Pinky's husband (2022)
- Akshita Sethi as Pinky Maurya:
  - Deepu's wife (2022)
- Samriddhi Singh as Shikha Maurya:
  - Shyamlal's daughter; Lala and Banphool's granddaughter; Kanaklata, Deepu and Manu's sister (2022)
- Satyajit Sharma as Shiv Shankar a.k.a. "Daddy" Kushwaha:
  - The local don of Lucknow, Gargi's father; Manu's father-in-law (2022)
