= Mere Dad Ki Dulhan =

Indian TV series by DJ's a Creative Unit

- Genre: Drama; Soap opera
- Directed by: Anshuman Kishore Singh; Rakesh Kumar; Varun Badola
- Creative director: Jagrut Vijay Mehta
- Starring: See below
- Composer: Raju Singh
- Country of origin: India
- Original language: Hindi
- No. of seasons: 1
- No. of episodes: 181

Production
- Producers: Tony Singh; Deeya Singh
- Camera setup: Multi-camera
- Production company: DJ's a Creative Unit

Original release
- Network: Sony Entertainment Television
- Release: 11 November 2019 – 19 November 2020

Mere Dad Ki Dulhan (transl. My Father's Bride) is an Indian soap opera which aired on Sony TV. The show was produced by DJ's a Creative Unit, stars Varun Badola, Shweta Tiwari and Anjali Tatrari in lead roles.

== Plot ==
Niya Sharma wins a chance to attend training in the office headquarters in the United States for two years but worries for her father Amber Sharma, a widower. Guneet Sikka, a forty-year-old woman has to leave her rented house in Delhi. Hence, Niya manipulates Amber to make Guneet live in his house so that she can look after him, thus, providing shelter to Guneet also. She leaves for America and meets Randeep Mehandiratta there, who lives in the same apartment. It is revealed that he is actually the son of Amber's enemy. Later, Amber goes through an accident due to which Niya comes back to India.

Niya thinks that Amber's life is incomplete and needs a companion and creates Amber's account on her dating app and he learns about it and later chats with Guneet blindly. Both Amber and Guneet become good friends on Niya's app but get into a heated argument while they meet face-to-face. Dr. Anurag Malhotra gets attracted to Guneet and Pammi settles Guneet's wedding with him. Later, after knowing that his chat-mate is none other than Guneet herself, Amber feels bad and deletes his account. So, Pammi fixes Guneet's engagement with Anurag. But Amber tries to stop her wedding and injures Pammi in the process and hence a case is filed against him.

Niya leaves her important meeting to free Amber, due to this the Management asks her to work under Shri. So, she quits her job and finds comfort in Randeep's company. Later, Guneet breaks her engagement as she started hating men due to her online partner (Amber). Niya and Kajal start working on their start-up and feel dejected when Kabir refuses to help the two. Niya and Kajal face-off with Kabir and Shree in the business rivalry. Later, Amber tries to reunite Kabir and Niya but fails. Later, Randeep leaves for United States and Niya and Randeep give each other an emotional goodbye. Elsewhere, Niya learns about Amber's feelings for Guneet. Guneet and Amber prepare dinner and invites Kabir and Shri without telling Niya so they can patch things up and Kabir and Niya get into an argument and eventually apologize to each other and reconcile.

Amber reveals his identity as Guneet's chat-mate and she feels deceived and slaps him. Niya learns about this and gets into a heated argument ousts Guneet causing both to dislike each other. Elsewhere Niya, Kabir, Kajal, and Shri reconcile and attend a seminar together under the guidance of Rishi Burman, an affluent businessman who halts at Niya's house.

Niya gets to know from Kabir that Swara loves him and he also confesses his feelings for her and Niya also learns her feelings about him but later, Kabir and Swara get into a relationship. Guneet initially hating Amber starts developing feelings for him. Kabir starts hating Niya when she mistakenly sends a wrong email to Rishi and later Niya confesses her love to Kabir and apologizes for her action. When Pammi meets with an accident, Guneet and Amber get closer while taking care of her. Elsewhere Niya, Kabir, and Swara get jumbled around their feelings towards each other. Later Guneet forgives Amber and decides to marry. However Amber wants a simple wedding but Guneet and her family want the wedding to be grand and fancy. AmNeet's wedding ceremony faces many hurdles but they get married happily despite the odds.

Newlyweds feel uncomfortable with each other and on the other hand, Niya tries to overcome Amber's possessiveness. Rishi overtakes WeNet and makes Niya the CEO of WeNet. Kabir says that Rishi might be doing this because he loves Niya. Rishi finally opens his feelings to Niya and Niya leaves without answering. Kabir and Swara announce their engagement which shatters Niya. Rishi consoles her. Guneet and Kajal arrange swayamvar for her to lift her. Niya gets upset with Guneet's actions while the latter learns about her pregnancy. Niya earlier hesitant about Guneet's pregnancy later gets happy and excited about it. Pammi discloses Guneet's pregnancy to Amber. On the other hand, AmNeet devises a plan to unite Niya and Kabir and accepts their relationship. They tricked Niya into admitting her feelings for Kabir. Kabir proposes to Niya and Niya accepts. Kajal and Shree learns of Guneet's pregnancy. Niya informs Kabhir that she has to go for two years for CEO training. Kabir supports her.

Amber plans Niya and Kabir's engagement because he does not know about New York. Niya is scared to tell Amber. Guneet tells Amber suddenly, shocking Niya. Amber gets mad. Guneet consoles Niya. Niya calls her "Gunni Maa" and they cry and hug. Niya and Guneet plans to make Amber understand. They fool him by using tough love idea. Amber understands. Niya and Kabir takes some vows. They all celebrate Diwali in the society.

Niya leaves for New York and cries. Amber, Guneet, and Kabir get emotional. Memories with all of them is reminisced. Niya leaves. Show ends on a happy note.

== Cast and characters ==
=== Main ===
- Varun Badola as Amber Sharma: Anjali's widower; Guneet's husband; Niya's father. (2019–2020)
- Shweta Tiwari as Guneet Sikka / Sharma: Pammi's daughter; Amber's wife; Niya's step-mother. (2019–2020)
- Anjali Tatrari as Niya Sharma: Amber and Anjali's daughter; Guneet's step-daughter; Kabir's love interest (2019–2020)

=== Recurring ===
- Vijay Tilani as Kabir Pant: Niya's love interest, Swara's ex-fiancé and colleague at WeNet. (2019–2020)
- Nidhi Seth as Swara Joshi: Kabir's ex-girlfriend and his colleague at WeNet.(2020).
- Shivani Sopori as Pammi Sikka: Guneet's mother (2019–2020)
- Samentha Fernandes as Kajal/Metroni (Niya's Metro Companion as called by Amber): Niya's best friend and partner in her firm, Design Sutra (2019–2020)
- Shaleen Malhotra as Rishi Burman: Amber and Niya's tenant, now love Niya (2020)
- Yash Pandit as KK Chaudhary (2019)
- Sunny Hinduja as Anurag Malhotra: Guneet's ex-fiancé (2020)
- Rohit Kumar as Rocky (2020)
- Rajendra Chawla as Dr. Pandey: Amber's doctor and best friend (2019–2020).
- Fahmaan Khan as Randeep Mehndiratta: Amber's business partner and Niya's friend (2019–2020)
- Sanchita Kulkarni as RJ Janhavi, Guneet's friend.(2020)
- Avantika Shetty as Anjali Sharma: Amber's late wife; Niya's mother (deceased) (2019–2020)
- Ajay Raju as Fruit Wala

== Production ==
=== Development ===
This show is produced by DJ's - A Creative Unit. Varun Badola, Shweta Tiwari and debutante Anjali Tatrari were cast as leads. Vijay Tilani was cast opposite Anjali Tatrari. Shivaani Sopuri, Samentha Fernandes, Rajendra Chawla were cast in pivotal roles. Soon Fahmaan Khan was cast opposite Anjali Tatrari but exited the show in late March 2020. Post COVID-19 pandemic in July 2020, Shaleen Malhotra was cast opposite Anjali Tatrari but exited in the last week of show.

The show was a finite series of 150 episodes but due to good response from the audience, it extended to 181 episodes and ended on 19 November 2020.

=== Broadcast ===
The show went on-air on 11 November 2019 from Monday to Thursday at 10 p.m. to 10:30 p.m. since KBC 11 was in production. Later post KBC 11, show was aired Monday to Friday at the same timeslot. Later when the production of KBC 12 was in telecast, Mere Dad Ki Dulhan was aired from Monday to Thursday at 10:50 p.m. to 11:20 p.m.

=== Filming ===
The filming of the series was halted on 19 March 2020 with 99th episode aired on 31 March 2020 due to COVID-19 pandemic. Later the filming again began in late June with new episodes aired from 20 July 2020. The shooting of the series was slowed down when Shweta Tiwari contracted COVID-19 and Varun Badola quarantined himself. The show wrapped up in early November with airing its last episode on 19 November 2020 and getting replaced by Story 9 Months Ki.

== Reception ==
The Quint reviewed, "Varun Badola embraces the prickliness of being a middle-aged widower and makes the audience empathise with him – even if it’s accompanied by a dose of annoyance. Thanks to Swetha Tiwari’s natural performance and the empathetic way in which her character is handled, we root for Guneet to find love again."

== Soundtrack ==
Mere Dad Ki Dulhan Original Sound Track

Soundtrack album by Raju Singh
- Released: 11 November 2019
- Genres: Romance; Family Soundtrack
- Language: Hindi
- Label: Sony Entertainment Television
- Producers: Tony Singh; Deeya Singh; Gia Singh; Jashan Singh

Mere Dad Ki Dulhan: Tracklisting
No.	Title	Artist	Length
1.	"Gaadi Don Pahiyoon Waali"	Kingshuk Chakravarty	2:41
2.	"Tumse Judi Hai Zindagi"	Kingshuk Chakravarty	2:03
3.	"Mehroom"	Joell Mukherjii; Aanandi Joshi	4:12
Total length:			8:56

== Awards ==
Year	Award	Category	Recipient	References
2020	ITA Awards	GR8! Performer of the Year (Female)	Shweta Tiwari	
2020	Screenwriters Association	Best Screenplay	Kartick Sitaraman	
2020	Screenwriters Association	Best Dialogues	Preeti Mamgain	
2021	ITA Awards	Best Actress Drama (Jury)	Shweta Tiwari	

== See also ==
- List of programs broadcast by Sony Entertainment Television
