= Jay Thakkar =

Indian Film Actor (Since 2004)

- Born: 15 November 1999 (age 26); Mumbai, Maharashtra, India
- Education: Masters in Marketing & Advertising from Mumbai University, 2023 Bachelors in Mass Media from Mumbai University, 2021
- Occupation: Film Actor
- Years active: 2004–present
- Website: https://jaythakkarofficial.com/

Jay Thakkar is an Indian film actor. He is primarily known for his acting in Bollywood movies such as Bhool Chuk Maaf alongside Rajkummar Rao and Kapkapiii alongside Shreyas Talpade and Tusshar Kapoor. He is also known for playing primary roles in series like UP65 Season 1 & 2, Ek Duje Ke Vaaste 2, Laakhon Me Ek, Laagi Tujhse Lagan and India's first silent comedy show - Gutur Gu season 1 & 2.

== Biography ==
Thakkar belongs to Mumbai, Maharashtra.

He made his acting debut as television actor with the project Devrani Jethani in 2004. He acted in Ekta Kapoor’s Man Mein Hai Vishwaas in 2005. In the year 2006, thakkar played a character named Surya in Karam Apnaa Apnaa and played as Jugnu in Amber Dhara in 2007. He also appeared in the show Boogie Woogie as celebrity guest performer.

In 2008, Thakkar made his debut in Bollywood with the film Maan Gaye Mughal-E-Aazam. In the same year he acted in Tv Serial Uttaran. In 2009, he acted in the project like Laagi Tujhse Lagan, Ladies Special and Accident on Hill Road, Ghar Ki Baat Hai and Pavitra Rishta. In 2010, he appeared in the India's 1st Silent Comedy show Guturgu on Sab Tv and Fear Files on Zee TV. Thakkar played as Negative Lead-Rakhbaan in The Adventure of Hatim in 2013. In the same year, he appeared in Hrithik Roshan starrer Main Krishna Hoon. He played a negative character named Young Dushasana in Suryaputra Karn. In 2019, he played a cameo role in the film Dream Girl. Thakkar acted in Ek Dujey Ke Vaaste 2 in 2020, Mauka E Vardaat in 2021, Ram Setu and Pranksters in 2022 and UP65 in 2023. In 2024, he appeared in Sony Liv's Adrishyam and Gullak Season 4.

== Filmography ==
| Year | Movie/TV | Character Name | Notes |
|---|---|---|---|
| 2004 | Devrani Jethani | Micky Ahuja | Debut in TV Series |
| 2005 | Man Mein Hai Vishwaas | | |
| 2006 | Karan Apnaa Apnaa | Surya | |
| 2007 | Amber Dhara | Jugnu | |
| 2007 | Boogie Woogie | Celebrity Guest Performer | |
| 2008 | Maan Gaye Mughal Aazam | Cameo | Debut in Bollywood |
| 2008 | Uttaran | Taklu | |
| 2009 | Laagi Tujhse Lagan | Sethji | |
| 2009 | Ghar Ki Baat Hai | Happy Singh | |
| 2009 | Pavitra Rishta | Chotu | |
| 2009 | Ladies Special | Tony Chadda | |
| 2009 | Accident on Hill Road | Ajju | Bollywood film |
| 2012 | Guturgu | Cheeku | |
| 2012 | Fear Files | | |
| 2013 | The Adventures of Hatim | Rakhban | |
| 2013 | Main Krishna Hoon | Tempo | Bollywood film |
| 2015 | Suryaputra Karna | Young Dushasana | |
| 2019 | Dream Girl | Director | Bollywood film |
| 2020 | Ek Dujey Ke Vaaste 2 | Bunty Miyaan | |
| 2021 | Mauka-E-Vardaat | Banphool | |
| 2022 | Ram Setu | Nishant | Bollywood film |
| 2023 | UP65 | Mohit Sharma | Season 1 & 2 |
| 2024 | Adrishyam | Muzammil | |
| 2024 | Gullak Season 4 | Suryanarayan | |
| 2025 | Bhool Chuk Maaf | Sushil | Bollywood film |
| 2025 | Kapkapiii | Nanku | Bollywood film |
