= Tere Bina Jiya Jaye Na =

Indian drama television series

- Genre: Drama
- Written by: Mrinal Jha; Zeheer Sheikh; Dialogues; Rajesh Chawla
- Screenplay by: Akshita Pandey
- Starring: Avinesh Rekhi; Anjali Tatrari; Rakshanda Khan
- Theme music composer: Raju Singh
- Opening theme: Tere Bina Jiya Jaye Na
- Country of origin: India
- Original language: Hindi
- No. of seasons: 1
- No. of episodes: 204

Production
- Producers: Anil Jha; Mohomed Morani; Mazhar Nadiadwala
- Camera setup: Multi-camera
- Running time: 22 minutes
- Production company: Dome Entertainment Private Limited

Original release
- Network: Zee TV
- Release: 9 November 2021 – 19 August 2022

Related
- Tula Pahate Re

Tere Bina Jiya Jaaye Na is a Hindi Indian television drama series which premiered on 9 November 2021 on Zee TV and digital platform ZEE5. It stars Avinesh Rekhi, Anjali Tatrari and Rakshanda Khan. It replaced Kyun Rishton Mein Katti Batti. It went off air on 19 August 2022.

== Plot ==
This is the complicated story of the royal couple of Ambikhapur, Devraj surnamed Dev and Krisha Singh Rathore. Their meeting took place in special circumstances as Devraj took advantage of Krisha's naivety to seduce and marry her. Little by little, the young woman soon realizes that her husband is not what he seems and discovers the hidden reason for their marriage: Daksh and Maya.

Dakshraj Singh Rathore known as Daksh and Maya are Dev's twin and Krisha's lookalike respectively. In the past, Daksh, disabled and traumatized by the death of his parents, found solace in Maya, a family friend to whom he became attached. Seeing Maya's importance in the good recovery of their heir, the Rathores asked for her hand for Devraj. And although he accepted out of love for his brother, he did not really live a happy married life because his new wife was very superficial and possessive. When Maya dies in an accident, Daksh, an eyewitness, can't get over it. Afraid that their reputation would be tarnished in view of his state, the Rathores, or at least only Devraj and Jaya Ma, his housekeeper, decide to lock him in a room in the mansion and make him appear dead at the same time as Maya.

The fact that Krisha looks like Maya has given Dev hope for his brother's recovery. This is among other reasons why he married her, so that she could pretend to be his late wife in Daksh's eyes and help him heal. Although the methods he uses are severe, Devraj succeeds in completely changing the personality of Krisha who bends to his will for fear of disappointing her family.

In the 50th episode, however, Krisha discovers the whole truth, thanks to the help and company of her brothers-in-law, Rathi and Arav. Daksh finally comes out of his confinement, and seeing her, mistakes her for Maya. Realizing that he has done wrong towards Krisha, Dev decides to free her, only to later discover that the young woman intends to stay out of love for him. Since then, Krisha acts and behaves like Maya whenever she is in Daksh's presence.

Meanwhile, Roma, Dev's close friend, the one without whom he could not have seduced Krisha, turns out to be obsessed with him. Wanting to keep Krisha away from him, she decides to attack Daksh and make him take the blame. But to her surprise, Daksh confronts her, revealing that in reality he wasn't even sick. The truth is that all this time he was pretending to curry favor with the whole family without lifting a finger. And rather than attacking Roma for having attempted on his life, he decides to form an alliance with her, for a single objective: to separate Krisha and Devraj and then marry them.

Despite being their own, none of Roma and Daksh's plans work. They even tried to orchestrate a marriage proposal from Daksh to Maya, based on Dev and Maya's divorce proceedings when she was still alive. Realizing his feelings for Krisha, Dev refuses to lie any longer and confesses Maya's real identity to his brother. Later, as Daksh pretends to get over it and Dev and Krisha are closer than ever, Krisha soon begins to have suspicions about her brother-in-law. While he reveals himself to her knowing that she will do nothing to expose him, he makes sure to break Devraj's trust in her, in vain. As a last resort, he then commits the unthinkable. In episode 90, Daksh orchestrates his own murder by ensuring that Krisha shoots him in front of Dev. From then on, it was not only him who lost confidence in our heroine, but all of her in-laws who, until then, had nothing but praise for her.

Rather than arrest her for Daksh's murder, Jaya Ma suggests making her stay at the palace to avoid alerting the media and tarnishing their reputation with legal proceedings. But Krisha is not at the end of her surprises, because every day she spends at the palace, her in-laws and even Dev only belittle her and constantly remind her of her responsibility for Daksh's death. Not giving up, she does everything to prove her innocence, and at the same time save her marriage on the verge of breakdown. Dev's uncles and cousins soon take advantage of their nephew's depression to usurp his power. Krisha, aware of this, decides to look after his interests by coming to work with him in his hotel complex. She even manages to prevent arms dealers from setting up their network there, and save the reputation of the royal family. When she finally proves her innocence by exposing Roma who, in the process, is expelled from the palace, all of her in-laws' trust in her is regained, and Devraj promises her to turn the page by finally agreeing to live as husband and wife.

== Cast ==
=== Main ===
- Avinesh Rekhi as
  - Devraj Singh Rathore – Prince of Ambikapur; Dakshraj's brother; Krisha's husband; Roma and Vamika's love interest (2021–2022)
  - Dakshraj Singh Rathore – Devraj's twin brother; Maya's love interest (2022) (Dead)
- Anjali Tatrari as
  - Krisha Singh Rathore – Sudha and Vishwanath's daughter; Yash's sister; Devraj's wife (2021–2022)
  - Maya – Krisha's lookalike; Dakshraj's love interest (2021-2022) (Dead)
- Rakshanda Khan as Jayalakshmi Singh – Devraj and Dakshraj's governess; Bhuvan's wife; Vamika's mother (2021–2022)
- Garima Singh Rathore as Vamika Singh – Jayalakshmi and Bhuvan's daughter; Maan's adopted daughter; Devraj's obsessed lover (2022) (Dead)

==== Recurring ====
- Rudra Kaushish as Virendra Singh Rathore F/O Dev Raj Singh Rathore
- Karuna Verma / Shweta Gautam as Sudha Chaturvedi – Vishwanath's wife; Krisha and Yash's mother
- Aashish Bharadwaj as Yash Chaturvedi – Vishwanath and Sudha's son; Krisha's brother
- Saptrishi Ghosh as Vishwanath Chaturvedi – Sudha's husband; Krisha and Yash's father
- Deepak Wadhwa as Jahangir Chaudhary – a contract killer/Akhil Mehra – a fake police inspector (2022) (Dead)
- Deepa Mishra as Aditi – Aarav's love interest
- Farah Lakhani as Naina Chaubey
- Riya Deepsi as Roma (2021-2022)
- Romil Chaudhary as Raghav Chaubey
- Utkarsha Naik as Meenakshi Gajvardhan Singh Rathore
- Leenesh Mattoo as Aarav Singh Rathore (2021-2022) (Dead)
- Simran Sharma as Rati Raghav Chaubey
- Leena Balodi as Ugra Chaubey
- Dhananjay Pandey
- Sandeep Hemnaoni as Gajvardhan Singh Rathore

- Deepak Dutt Sharma
- Vikas Vasu
- Kriti Verma
- Girish Thapar
- Pinky Bankar as Aditi's mother
- Manoj Verma as Aditi's father
- Sharad Ghore
- Mukesh Fotwani
- Praveen Pachpore
- Nayan Bhatt
- Aryan Arora
- Akshay Dandekar as Head Servant of Devraj
- Krishnakant Singh Bundela as Panditji
- Ujjwal Gauraha as Mr. Diwan
