= Ek Duje Ke Vaaste 2 =

Indian television series

- Genre: Romantic Drama
- Written by: Dilip Jha, Akash Virmani, Manu Sharma, Aditya Singh
- Directed by: Jai Basant Singh, Ranjeet Gupta
- Creative director: Uday Berry
- Starring: Mohit Kumar; Kanikka Kapur; Vidhi Pandya
- Opening theme: "Ek Duje Ke Vaaste"
- Composers: Adil Prashant; Raaj
- Country of origin: India
- Original language: Hindi
- No. of seasons: 1
- No. of episodes: 218 (list of episodes)

Production
- Producers: Dilip Jha; Archita Jha
- Editor: Rocchak Ahuja
- Running time: 21–22 minutes
- Production companies: Bindu Moving Images; Team Studio Next

Original release
- Network: Sony Entertainment Television; SonyLIV
- Release: 10 February 2020 – 31 March 2021

Related
- Ek Duje Ke Vaaste

Ek Duje Ke Vaaste 2 (transl. Made for each other 2) is an Indian Hindi-language romantic television series, based on Army background, aired on SonyLIV. The series initially starred Mohit Kumar and Kanikka Kapur, until Kapur was replaced by Vidhi Pandya. The earlier episodes were also aired on Sony Entertainment Television. It is a spiritual successor of the series Ek Duje Ke Vaaste.

== Summary ==
This show is set in Bhopal. Shravan Malhotra, a spoilt and indisciplined civilian teenager is sent to an army school to learn discipline where he meets Suman Tiwari, a fully disciplined and ambitious girl from an army family who is the daughter of Colonel Vijay Tiwari who is, in turn, Shravan's father Devraj's friend. Initially, both despise each other due to their different backgrounds.

Shravan dislikes the discrimination between army and civilian students and the conflicts this often leads to. Suman and Shravan are constantly at odds with each other as they try to prove the other's view wrong. However, despite their constant clashes, Shravan falls in love with Suman. He tries to confess his love to her but hesitates. Shravan's father has an argument with Suman's father, Vijay, and the two families grow to dislike each other. Several incidents take place, increasing this tension. Meanwhile, Suman learns about Shravan's feelings for her. She mistakes this to be just a teenage crush and decides to ask him to be her best friend instead. Shravan finally confesses his love to Suman. Hearing the confession, she decides not to remain in contact with him as she worries that not doing so will cause Shravan more pain, unaware that deep down, she has feelings for him as well. Separately, Anish challenges Shravan by placing Suman's honour at stake. In order to defend her, Shravan takes up the challenge. While the two are competing, Shravan falls from a high wall but Suman risks her own life and saves him. When questioned by Shravan about why she took such a huge risk just to save him, Suman is unable to answer and she realises how deeply she has fallen for him. The next day, she confesses her feelings for him. Later, they both go on a date where Suman is kidnapped and later saved by Shravan. A huge misunderstanding breaks out between both their families due to which Shravan ends up pathetically begging Suman's grandfather to not take the matter further. Suman watches this scenario helplessly and later breaks down as she hates seeing Shravan beg. They meet at SuVan corner regularly to talk, study together, teach each other new things and give presents to each other. Later they permanently tattoo each other's name - Shravan on his chest and Suman on her back.

After months of secret love, they are finally discovered almost kissing by their families. Enraged, both families decide to send their children away so that they do not meet each other. Shravan and Suman decide to elope so that they can buy time hoping their family will understand their true love for each other and accept their relationship. Elsewhere, Vijay gets killed while fighting insurrectionists in a counterinsurgency operation. Suman regrets that she had been cold towards her father in their last meeting. Devraj is arrested on charges of making a low-quality bulletproof vest and goods for the army and is blamed for Vijay's death. Suman believes this and breaks up with Shravan, leaving him heartbroken.

=== After 7 years ===
Hatred has made both Shravan and Suman strangers to each other for the last 7 years. Shravan is a captain in the Dhar regiment of the Indian Army. He is considered a daredevil by his platoon. Unknown to him, Suman is now a Surgeon captain in the AMC. The once perfectly disciplined, obedient, and cheerful Suman has now evolved into a strict yet rebellious and unruly army doctor who does not bow down to anyone. Both now live in broken families- Suman's mother is no more and in her absence, Suman's once loving aunt now has property-related issues with Suman. On the other hand, Shravan is struggling to manage his father's legal complications as well as his uncle who is now a depressed divorcee. Also, Shravan's cousin, Avni, now lives with her mother and avoids Rajendra. On the other hand, Suman's lawyer, Vikram, is interested in Suman and tries to impress her.

Separately, both of them prepare for the final verdict of the case which was filed against Shravan's father by Suman's family long back. For the same, they return to their home town Bhopal, where they meet unexpectedly. It so happened that Suman's cousin brother Veer was saved by Shravan from a fatal truck collision, in which Shravan gets grievously injured. Ensuing their sudden meet, they cherish intense hostility and disdain for each other due to their past. To their dismay, the Military Hospital Commandant assigns Suman to treat Shravan. Meanwhile, Kanchan, Suman's cousin sister, returns from her hostel, and Vikram befriends Shravan, who unknowingly helps Vikram impress Suman. Shravan also gets to know that Vikram and Suman are in a relationship, enraging him.

A few weeks later, the case verdict is out and Shravan wins the case. Suman is dejected because she feels that she couldn't give justice to Vijay. At Veer's birthday party, both Suman and Shravan confess their heart out and how much they missed each other during their difficult times. The confession turns into an argument as she still feels that the earlier punishment given to Devraj is not enough. The next day, Suman files the case again in the high court. Vikram notices the tiff between the two and thus Suman reveals their past relationship to Vikram but she mentioned it as a high school attraction. This irks Shravan and he vows to irritate Suman.

Shravan sells his house but is unable to find any alternative accommodation as he needs to stay for a few days more due to his recovering injury. Suman's aunt asks Shravan to stay as a paying guest in their house, to which he agreed. Sophie is then introduced. Sharavan and Sophie click instantly which makes Suman quite jealous. After an encounter with Vikram, Sophie tells Shravan that she is the ex-girlfriend of Vikram. Vikram is afraid that Suman might consider him a loser because Sophie had dumped him earlier and so, he does not turn up for the invited dinner which hurts Suman. Suman is taunted by Chachi. This makes Shravan sad and he helps Vikram realizing his mistake. Suman gets to know about this which increases her respect for Shravan. They start to have good care and bond again only to realize that they have been hurt by each other in the past and should not let their inner feelings take over. They decide to show each other that they have 'moved on' by getting closer to their respective partners.

During a wedding, Avni visits the Malhotra home once again and instantly realizes that Suman and Shravan still possess strong feelings for each other. Separately, Suman and Shravan each realize that they still love each other. On discovering that Shravan had helped him in her financial difficulties furtively, Suman discerns Shravan still cares for her and she vows to dig the truth. But before she could interrogate Shravan, she sees Shravan with Sophie and misconceives them to be dating. Dejected, she decides against confessing and to move on with some happy memories of time spent with Shravan. She even withdraws the judicial case against Shravan's father. On the other hand, based on Bunty's viewpoint, Shravan gets a hunch that Suman feels for her and attempts to divulge his love to the latter. But before he could confess, Suman accedes to Vikram's marriage proposal. It renders Shravan heartbroken and he determines to drift away from Suman as soon as possible so as to not cause any grief to either Suman or Vikram.

As Shravan has healed and is fit to join his command and resume his duty, he insists to scram away immediately. It agonizes Suman further as she craved for Shravan's company. Shravan's sudden departure devastates Suman. She meets with a minor road accident due to incautious driving and sprains her ankle. On hearing the news, Shravan succumbs to returning Bhopal in order to visit Suman.

Few day later, Suman's engagement is finalized with Vikram. However, on the day of engagement, Shravan proposes to Suman and she accepts, breaking the alliance with Vikram.

After lots of efforts, SuVan finally manages to get consent for their marriage from their respective families, and they get married. Suman becomes ADC Major Dr. Suman Malhotra and Shravan becomes Major Shravan Malhotra.

Although their marriage and love is tested several times, their true love for each other always prevails.

== Cast ==
=== Main ===
- Mohit Kumar as Major Shravan Malhotra of the Dhar Regiment: Devraj and Kavita's son; Avni's cousin; Suman's husband. He was a happy-go-lucky, affluent, indisciplined, and spoilt teenager from a civilian background. Later, he became Suman's love interest. However, after Vijay's death, both end their relationship. After the leap, he is a captain (later Major) in the Indian Army (Infantry). Shravan and Suman got married as they realise that they still love each other. (2020–2021)
- Kanikka Kapur / Vidhi Pandya as Major Dr. Suman Tiwari Malhotra ADC: Anjali and Vijay's daughter; Kanchan and Veer's cousin; Shravan's wife. She was a disciplined, ambitious teenager who views the world from the army's perspective as she is brought up in a family of army officers. Later, she became Shravan's love interest. However, after her father's death, she slaps him, humiliates Shravan and his father and ends their relationship. After the leap, she is a captain (later Major) and doctor in the Indian Army Medical Forces (AMC). (2020–2021) / (2021)

=== Recurring ===
- Akshay Anand as Devraj Malhotra: CEO of a defense industry; Rajendra's brother; Kavita's husband; Shravan's father; Vijay's former best friend. He was Vijay's best friend but after a misunderstanding with Vijay, both families started to dislike each other. He faced humiliation from Mohan Tiwari. Tiwaris consider him responsible for Vijay's death as his company made bulletproof vests for army. He later is shown to be proven innocent and wins the case. After the leap he shown to hate Tiwaris and wants revenge. Later on, he accepts Suman as his daughter-in-law happily. (2020–2021)
- Mamta Varma / Soni Srivastava as Kavita Malhotra: Devraj's wife; Shravan's mother and Devraj's wife. She is a caring lady and loves her family and especially her son Shravan and always supports Shravan. (2020) / (2020–2021)
- Takshi Negi / Twinkle Saini as Avni Malhotra: Rajendra and Ragini's daughter; Shravan's cousin. (2020) / (2021)
- Rahul Parenja / Ahtesham Azad Khan as Rajendra Malhotra: Devraj's brother; Ragini's husband; Avni's father. He always at odds with Brigadier Mohan Tiwari. (2020) / (2020–2021).
- Bhavya Mishra as Ragini Malhotra: Rajendra's wife; Avni's mother. (2020–2021)
- Jay Thakkar as Bunty: Shravan's best friend; Kanchan's fiancé. He helps Shravan with his various problems. He was a loyal friend of Shravan and was always standing by his side. After leap, helps Shravan to reunite with Suman. (2020–2021)
- Nivedita Soni as Jhumri: Malhotras' housemaid; Damru's wife. (2020–2021)
- Anurag Arora as Martyr Colonel Vijay Tiwari VrC SM: Mohan's elder son; Ramesh's brother; Anjali's husband; Suman's father; Devraj's former best friend. He was a strict army officer who had received many bravery awards for his dedication towards his work. After having a misunderstanding with Devraj, both the families started to dislike each other. He died while fighting terrorists and Devraj was blamed for the former as his company produced low-quality bulletproof jackets and goods for Army. (2020) (Dead)
- Reema Vohra / Shubha Saxena as Anjali Tiwari: Vijay's widow; Suman's mother. She was a very kind-hearted, calm, and composed lady. (2020) (Dead)
- Ahmed Khan as Late Brigadier Retd. Mohan Tiwari: Vijay and Ramesh's father; Suman, Kanchan and Veer's grandfather. He was a retired army officer and very strict by nature and looked down on civilians. He hated Malhotras and created a misunderstanding between Devraj and Vijay. (2020) (Dead)
- Khushi Mishra as Kanchan Tiwari: Ramesh and Beena's daughter; Veer's sister; Suman's cousin; Bunty's fiancée. Initially, she had a crush on Shravan, but later supports Suman and Shravan's love enthusiastically and helps Suman to realise Shravan's feelings. She is a very loving and supportive sister to Suman. After the leap, she is shown to have returned from the college hostel after her event management course and it is revealed that she was sent to a hostel because she helped Suman and Shravan to elope. She baselessly held Shravan responsible for all the mess and hated him. She wanted Suman to marry Vikram without knowing Suman's feelings. After knowing Suman's feelings, She helps Suman and Shravan to get married. (2020–2021)
- Shiv Chopra as Ramesh Tiwari: Mohan's younger son; Vijay's brother; Beena's husband; Kanchan and Veer's father. His father, Mohan Tiwari wanted him to become an army officer like Vijay but he failed to do so due to his asthma, which he sometimes regrets. He takes care of Suman after his brother's death and now he has to provide for his family and take care of expenses. (2020–2021)
- Seema Saxena as Beena Tiwari: Ramesh's wife; Kanchan's and Veer's mother. She was a loving and caring aunt to Suman but after the latter's parents' death, she gradually started having property related issues with Suman. She apologized to Shravan and his family because of Devraj winning the case. (2020–2021)
- Devansh Malviya as Veer Tiwari: Ramesh and Beena's son; Kanchan's brother; Suman's cousin. He develops close friendship with Shravan.(2020–2021)
- Ghanshyam Tiwari as Damru: A home-helper at Tiwaris'; Jhumri's husband. All Tiwari family treats him like a family member. (2020–2021)
- Fahad Ali as Vikram Jaiswal: Suman's new lawyer and friend after the leap. He also becomes friends with Shravan. He was ex-boyfriend of Sophie. He is shown to be obsessed with marriage, and had developed one-sided love for Suman. He was very clingy and ultimately got rejected by Suman too.(2020)
- Taruna Nirankari as Sophie Matthews: Vikram's ex-girlfriend; Shravan's friend and one-sided lover. She is a wedding planner. Later on, She leaves Bhopal with a broken heart after discovering Shravan's love for Suman. (2020)
- Nishant Raghuvanshi as Captain Anish Bhan: Shravan and Suman's classmate. He belongs from a military family. He is Shravan and Suman's classmate. He hates Shravan for his undisciplined attitude. The hatred takes the form of hostility after he starts loving Suman. After a leap, he is now an army officer. (2020)
- Kashish Kanwar as Devika Sinha: Shravan's former girlfriend and Suman's friend. Shravan breaks up with her for the sake of his love for Suman after which Devika joins hands with Anish and plots against Shravan. After a leap, she married an army officer. (2020)
- Vipul Singh as Saheb, Shravan's civilian friend. (2020)
- Rushil Jain as Captain Nishant Bassi: Shravan's NDA Batchmate and friend (2020–2021)
- Vinay Vidhani as Lieutenant Saurabh Manwani: Shravan's junior in NDA and friend. (2020–2021)
- Unknown as Colonel Arvind Gujral SM, Suman's senior officer, and hospital commandant. (2020–2021)
- Shekhar Singh as Major Ronak Joshi, Suman's colleague in AMC regiment. (2021)
- Aarav Kanha Sharma as Ayaan, Avni's fiancée. (2021)

== List of episodes ==
No.	Title	Original release date
1	"Suman Can't Stand Shravan"	10 February 2020
Suman is a disciplined army kid. Her life is all about rules and consequences until she meets Shravan. Shravan is a civilian, and a brat too. While they do not see each other’s faces, Suman brands Shravan a thief because of his foolhardy actions. They are new neighbours and are about to meet at the same Army event.
2	"Suman Meets Shravan"	11 February 2020
Col. Tiwari is being honoured in an Army Event. Shravan goes there with his father. Suman finally meets him. They start off on the wrong foot when Suman realises that Shravan is the same ‘thief’ she had chased earlier in the day, and when Shravan realises she has his prized cricket match ticket, all hell breaks loose.
3	"Shravan Goes To Army School"	12 February 2020
Shravan’s family attends the army lunch. There Suman is praised for being the first female cadet to lead her school in 26 January parade. However, Shravan, who was already having a bad day, sees his fortune go from bad to worse when his activities are exposed before his father. Suman then recommends to Shravan’s father, Devraj, to send him to the Army Public School. Devraj readily decides to do the same. This leaves Suman and Shravan at each other’s throats.
4	"Suman Punishes Shravan"	13 February 2020
Shravan thinks that he will be rejected from the army school, because of the long selection process. Unexpectedly, he gets inducted on his very first. Suman and Shravan are present in the assembly. Shravan misbehaves in the assembly, and Suman punishes him for it.
5	"Shravan Ignores Suman’s Warning"	14 February 2020
Shravan and Suman’s friction escalates further when Suman warns Shravan and reminds him to behave appropriately. Shravan, however, does the opposite and challenges the status quo at school. The situation goes out of hand. The battle between Army versus civilian’s kids begins.
6	"Shravan Is In Trouble"	17 February 2020
Team Army Kids hate Shravan. They trouble him at the school. This makes Shravan realize that his Army School course is not going to be easy.
7	"Shravan’s Rebellion Continues"	18 February 2020
In the auditorium, Shravan announces in front of all the students that this year civilian kids will participate in 26 January fest. However, Suman is not in favor of this unnecessary rebellion. When Shravan sees that not even a single civilian kid is showing enthusiasm, he decides to encourage and unite them.
8	"Shravan Challenges Aneesh"	19 February 2020
Shravan unites the entire civilian students and motivates them to be a part of the fest. Shravan then challenges Aneesh and promises him to change the status quo. Shravan views Suman as a de facto enemy in this fight.
9	"Shravan and Aneesh’s Fist Fight"	20 February 2020
Due to Shravan’s meddling, Aneesh loses out on the play and Shravan becomes the lead. This angers Aneesh and he gets into a fistfight with Shravan. The news reaches the Principal’s ears. He gets upset and brings in the Army-Civilian buddy system. Despite Shravan and Suman’s unwillingness, they are paired together.
10	"Suman Is Stuck In Partnership"	21 February 2020
Suman tries hard but fails in changing the budding pair. She finally gives in and tells Shravan that they will be buddies only inside the school.
11	"Suman And Shravan be Buddies?"	24 February 2020
Suman and Sharavan spend their first day as buddies. But they argue and disagree on almost everything. Finally, the day ends well for Shravan as he is mesmerized by Suman’s performance in the play rehearsal.
12	"Shravan Vs The Bullies"	25 February 2020
Shravan stands up for a weak friend against the bullies. This impresses Suman. Devika too gets impressed with Shravan’s act and starts bonding with him. Suman senses Shravan’s intentions towards Devika.
13	"Shravan Sees Suman Cry"	26 February 2020
Sharvan lies to Bunty about Suman’s talents. She overhears Shravan and feels upset. When Shravan gets to know of this, he goes to Suman and apologizes to her. He notices Suman crying for a soldier’s death.
14	"Shravan & Suman Are Unable To Rehearse"	27 February 2020
Shravan and Suman are not able to rehearse for the play, due to their lack of understanding towards each other. So they decide to meet outside their school, in a cafe to understand each other as it will help them rehearse. Shravan and Suman discover each other’s true nature in this interaction.
15	"Suman is Jealous"	28 February 2020
Suman gets irritated with Shravan when he leaves to meet Devika without informing her. Later, Shravan insists that he and Suman should meet again. They meet at Shravan’s place for play rehearsals. There, a moment of understanding develops between them. Suman gets impressed seeing Shravan’s trophies and medals. However, Suman is still doubtful of Shravan’s achievements as she is totally unaware of this side of him.
16	"Suman Traps Shravan"	2 March 2020
Shravan’s dad gives him a responsibility to handover a file in the army cantonment. Meanwhile, Suman also decides to go to the cantonment with her mother as she is going to the Army Wives Welfare Association for a meeting to help a Subedar’s Daughter-In-Law. Shravan and Suman end up meeting in the cantonment. Later, Suman traps Shravan into playing a badminton game with her father, Vijay.
17	"Shravan Accepts Suman’s Challenge"	3 March 2020
Shravan plays the ‘don’t blink your eyes’ game with Devika and lies that he cannot look at Devika anymore as he sees his dead ex-girlfriend in her eyes. Devika believes him and is shattered. Suman challenges Shravan to impress her grandfather. Shravan accepts the challenge. Shravan wakes up early to join Suman and her grandfather for a jog but he finds impressing the grandfather not that easy.
18	"Shravan Is Caught Lying"	4 March 2020
Suman's grandfather is waiting to beat Shravan in the game. But Shravan doesn't show up. When asked, Shravan comes up with a story that Suman doesn't believe in. Shravan says that his best friend has met with an accident, hence justifying his absence. Later, Devika comes over to Suman's after school and is worried as to why Shravan isn't speaking to her.
19	"Shravan Loses The Bet"	5 March 2020
Shravan applies a chess tactic from an old film while playing against Suman's grandfather. He still does not succeed in winning the chess game. Suman is ecstatic and makes Shravan agree to do the things according to her wishes, as the prize of winning the bet against Shravan.
20	"Vijay Leaves For A Mission"	6 March 2020
Suman's father, Vijay, who is in the army, has to leave for an important mission without meeting Suman. When Suman gets upset when she returns home and finds her father gone. She is unhappy because they hadn't met before her father left for the mission. Suman confides in Shravan. Shravan wants Suman to meet her father before it's too late to meet him. They set off to meet Vijay.
21	"Suman Worries About Vijay"	9 March 2020
Suman and Shravan hang out and go to eat local food. Meanwhile, Shravan keeps receiving calls from Devika but lies to Suman about the same. Suman thinks Shravan is irresponsible since he has forgotten his wallet including his license. Hence, she doesn’t sit with him on his bike and goes home in an auto. This annoys Shravan. The following morning, the Tiwari family gets to know through Television News that Vijay and his team have been injured. Suman is extremely worried and hence skips school. Shravan having felt Suman’s absence in school decides to give her a call after school.
22	"Shravan's Family Consoles The Tiwari's"	10 March 2020
Shravan calls Suman who tells him about Vijay's injury. Shravan and his family visit the Tiwari's house to console them. Suman likes Shravan's gesture. An injured Vijay returns home. The family is happy and emotional on seeing him. Shravan and Suman are now friends. Shravan lies about his relationship with Devika. Meanwhile, an emotional scene unfolds about Suman’s grandfather's dream.
23	"Shravan Lies Again"	11 March 2020
Suman ditches Bunty as he wants to see Devika. Suman and her grandfather take Vijay to the hospital where they meet Bunty. Suman discovers Shravan's lie and they decide to tease Shravan. The doctor advises Vijay to take his injury seriously and give his body rest. Suman and Bunty end up teasing Shravan who is clueless.
24	"Shravan’s Mother Knows About His Relationship"	12 March 2020
Suman and Bunty remain in contact and come up with plans to annoy Shravan. Shravan gets suspicious. However, during play rehearsals in school, Shravan ends up performing better and naturally when he is paired opposite Suman but messes up his part and cannot perform well when paired with Devika. Devika is hurt by this and ends up leaving the auditorium crying. Shravan lies to her in order to console her. Devika buys his lie. Later, Suman visits Shravan’s house and ends up revealing about Shravan and Devika’s relationship to his mother. She does not do so intentionally and feels guilty.
25	"Shravan And Suman Fight"	13 March 2020
Shravan finds out that Bunty and Suman have decided to team up. On the other hand, Ramesh ponders over the monetary help offered by Devraj for his business. Shravan and Suman end up fighting as Shravan refuses to accept Suman's advice for him. They end up complaining about each other to their respective siblings.
26	"What Does Shravan Tell Devika?"	16 March 2020
After ignoring Shravan for a while, Suman finally talks to him and they discuss everything that Shravan dislikes about Devika. Later, he confronts Devika and she promises not to trouble him. Shravan realises that it was easier to do it than he believed. Meanwhile, Shravan’s and Suman’s fathers decide to attend the PTA.
27	"Devika Offends Devraj"	17 March 2020
When the PTA takes place, Suman advises Shravan to make Devika meet his parents. Shravan agrees to do so. A chatty Devika though ends up offending Devraj. Devraj dislikes Devika’s behaviour and scolds Shravan asking him to concentrate on his studies.
28	"Sharavan Caught In A Girls' Competition"	18 March 2020
Vijay invites Shravan and Devraj for breakfast early in the morning. Shravan is seen mesmerized by Suman. Shravan is neither able to understand his feelings, nor control them. On the other hand, Aneesh asks Devika to convince Shravan to go for a party. Shravan doesn’t see Suman in class and realizes that she had been missing since she was at a debate competition for girls. He tries to go and watch it but gets caught by a teacher since the competition is for girls only. Meanwhile, Devika ends up telling everybody that Shravan tried to meet her.
29	"Devika Is Upset"	19 March 2020
Suman feels sorry for Shravan who has been punished. Devraj and Vijay have come to school for a meeting and Devraj feels embarrassed on seeing Shravan being punished. Shravan apologises to Suman for embarrassing her. Devika overhears their conversation and gets upset. Aneesh asks Devika to persuade Suman so that she can convince Shravan to attend the party. Later in the night, Shravan visits Suman and realises that she is the one for him.
30	"Shravan-Devika's Break Up"	20 March 2020
Devika is hurt as Shravan breaks up with her. But Suman is happy that Shravan spoke the truth. Shravan agrees to go to the party thinking that Suman would also be going. This makes Aneesh happy. Later, Shravan wants to celebrate his freedom with Suman and asks her to accompany him for a bike ride around Bhopal. Initially, Suman disagrees but they end up going, which makes Shravan very happy.
31	"Suman Rejects Shravan’s Offer"	23 March 2020
At school, Suman is upset with Shravan for his ill-mannered behaviour. Shravan asks Suman what time he should pick her up for the party. Suman refuses his offer and says she’d manage on her own. The party has begun and Devika and Aneesh wait for Shravan. Suman arrives with Kanchan and looks stunning. Shravan decides to apologise to Suman.
32	"Will Devika’s Plan Succeed?"	24 March 2020
Devika and Aneesh have hatched a plan. But for their plan to work, it is imperative that Shravan comes for the party. Both, Devika and Aneesh are worried about this. They decide to execute their plan as soon as Shravan enters.
33	"Aneesh Successfully Traps Shravan"	25 March 2020
Aneesh and Devika gather everyone around in the party to expose Shravan's lie about Suman's crush on him. When Suman learns this she feels broken. In the meantime, Devika grabs the opportunity and puts the cake on Shravan’s face to get her revenge. Later, Shravan tries to explain himself to Suman but Kanchan does not let him.
34	"Kanchan And Aneesh Team Up"	26 March 2020
Kanchan decides to team up with Aneesh and his friends to teach Shravan a lesson. So, Aneesh purposely punctures the tyre of Shravan's bike and looking at Shravan’s struggle, Kanchan helps him reach home. She calls Shravan at her house to meet Suman. But when Shravan reaches her house, he looks at his parents present there. He understands Kanchan’s plan to expose him in front of them.
35	"Suman Saves Shravan Again"	27 March 2020
When Suman tries to call Shravan, he keeps rejecting her calls in fear. Finally, Suman seeks Bunty’s help to talk to Shravan and explains to him that they haven't told anything to his parents. Shravan is amused to see Suman helping him again.
36	"Shravan Upsets Suman"	30 March 2020
Shravan offers something to Suman, but she accidentally hits his forehead while declining the offer. Shravan thinks that Suman would partner up with him for the Buddy Project. But Suman disagrees. On the day of the presentation, Suman fails the project and the principal of the school is disappointed. Shravan on the other hand appreciates Suman and talks about the things that he has learned after knowing her. Shravan agrees to take up any punishment for his partner’s failure in the project. The principal asks Shravan to choose his own punishment and declares the Buddy Project a success. Shravan takes up the duty of waiting tables in the canteen.
37	"Bhopali's Suggestion"	31 March 2020
Shravan's punishment does not impress Suman. Bhopali has a conversation with Shravan as to how he can be forgiven. Shravan and Bunty discuss the matter at night, by the lake. Shravan wants to know whether he should continue persuading Suman or give her space. The following morning, Suman notices Damru wearing a t-shirt with the words 'I am sorry' printed across and she understands that this has been done by Shravan. Meanwhile, Vijay and grandfather find out that Ramesh had taken money from Devraj. At school, Shravan becomes the chemistry lab assistant in order to seek Suman's forgiveness but Suman doesn't seem to care. Aneesh mixes up Shravan's chemicals. Suman sees this but doesn't stop Shravan from continuing the experiment anyway. Shravan, in spite of knowing that the chemicals are incorrect, continues his experiment waiting for Suman to stop him. Finally, the teacher stops Shravan and asks Suman to help him with the experiment. Suman later scolds Aneesh, which Shravan is happy to see. Vijay ignores Devraj when they see each other and this makes Devraj anxious. Bhopali advises Shravan to donate blood at the blood camp to impress Suman. Shravan is stunned on hearing this suggestion since he is afraid of needles.
38	"The Excitement"	20 July 2020
Shravan's punishment does not impress Suman. Bhopali has a conversation with Shravan as to how Shravan's sleeping in his bedroom while the girl of his dream jumped over the fences to surprise him. She wakes him up and tells him that her family isn't ready to accept Shravan.
39	"Tensed Situation"	21 July 2020
Shravan's father went to his friend but comes back little disturbed. He asks for tea but leaves without having it. Shravan follows him to know the reason behind his distress.
40	"Shravan Has Something To Say"	22 July 2020
Shravan's father is asked to step aside from the property, while Suman's father receives a call from his Colonel. Shravan comes back to talk to Suman but she is adamant on her side.
41	"Shravan Gets The Permission"	23 July 2020
Shravan's father stops him while he was leaving the house. He asks him about his new avatar and upon getting to know that his son is going to his nemesis's house for group study he feels proud of them.
42	"Suman's Plan"	24 July 2020
Suman's father is worried about his Devraj and the feud they had earlier. A while later he gets to know that Devraj has hurt his hand and Suman has asked their maid to deliver the ointment to Shravan as well. Apparently, Suman's grandfather punctured one of the tyres of Shravan's Bike.
43	"Shravan's Dilemma"	27 July 2020
Shravan is caught in the midway while going for group studies. He is asked to team with by his brother and help him in teaching Suman's family a lesson. On hearing about the group study, everyone tries to stop Shravan, and meanwhile, Suman's grandfather is planning something huge
44	"Shravan's Waking Up Strategy"	28 July 2020
Shravan is trying out a new outfit while talking to his friend Bunty. He's drowned in several thoughts about waking up at 5 in the morning and how he'd be able to pull it off. Bunty's suggestions are also not making any sense to him.
45	"Sharvan Is Late For The Class"	29 July 2020
Suman's father is happy with Shravan's gesture, but as he is late for the class, there is a discussion that takes place if he should be punished or not. Suman sheds her own thoughts about the matter and asks his father to decide on what is to be done.
46	"Shravan's Master Stroke?"	30 July 2020
Shravan lays out some of the proudest and patriotic facts in front of the class. Suman's father is surely impressed with Shravan's new persona. While Shravan's father is eavesdropping on their class, the proud feeling for his son can be seen on his face.
47	"The Outburst"	31 July 2020
Shravan tries to sneak out of his home to attend the extra class, but while making his exit he was caught red-handed by his mother. She is extremely angry on Shravan for not listening to anyone and for ignoring the insults which his family went through.
48	"Sharvan seeks Suman's help"	3 August 2020
Shravan seeks Suman's help in convincing her family to let Suman study at his house. Will Suman and Shravan be able to convince Suman's family.
49	"The Class Continues"	4 August 2020
Shravan announces that the class will be continued in his house and he wishes if everyone behaved properly in front of them. Meanwhile, Shravan is excited to see his plan getting executed as he thought it should.
50	"A Family Argument"	5 August 2020
Shravan's father is extremely angry at his brother's ill behaviour towards his Colonel friend's father. He lashes out on him and tells him to keep his calm. Meanwhile, Shravan's mother loses her calm and speaks up about her husband being biased towards his friend.
51	"Shravan's surprise for her mother"	6 August 2020
Shravan wants to make her mother happy thus he plans a surprise for her.
52	"Clever Daddu"	7 August 2020
Daddu received Shravan's call and has decided to host Malhotra's to his house.
53	"Letter From Suman's Daddu"	10 August 2020
Shravan receives a letter from Suman's Daddu which makes him upset and worried.
54	"Shravan Ignores Suman"	11 August 2020
Shravan is trying his best to ignore Suman, while Suman is trying her best to make conversations with him. Meanwhile, Bunty is trying to think of an idea to get these love birds hitched for life.
55	"Suman Is Impressed"	12 August 2020
Suman opens up about her views on Shravan. She talks about how much he cares for his family and how that surprise impressed her. Shravan feels elevated hearing such good words coming from Suman.
56	"Suman Is Happy"	13 August 2020
Suman was happy to see her father and Shravan's father bonding again at the party. She thinks there's finally a hope where those two can be friends again. And she shares this thought with her sister and wishes to bring back their lost friendship.
57	"Shravan In A False Situation"	14 August 2020
Shravan is in a false and awkward situation, and calls up his friend for help. Shravan asks his friend to him some of his clothes from his house and to reach Suman's place where he is but warns him that no one should see him there while coming.
58	"The Towel Conundrum"	17 August 2020
Vijay is getting ready for a jog after being at home rest for a few weeks. He along with his father walk past Devraj's house and Vijay seems a bit concerned about him. He asks his father whether he has heard from Devraj since the party.
59	"Vijay Is Concerned"	18 August 2020
Suman is asked about the towel used by Shravan while taking a bath in her bathroom. She asks her sister to throw it away in the dustbin. But her sister asks Suman to give to Shravan himself so that it does not get wasted.
60	"Suman Gets Her Hand On Shravan's Phone"	19 August 2020
Suman gets to know about Shravan's feeling but Shravan very smartly avoids the situation. Later, during studies, Suman gets his hands on Shravan's phone.
61	"Suman Gets To Know About Shravan's Feeling"	20 August 2020
Suman sees a folder of her pictures in Shravan's phone which makes her realize that Shravan has feelings for her.
62	"Shravan Is Super Excited"	21 August 2020
Sharvan is completely lost in Suman's thought and is extremely happy and excited about meeting her the next morning as they both will be going out for jogging.
63	"Shravan Is Shattered"	24 August 2020
Shravan is extremely upset and shattered as Suman has very clearly stated that she thinks of him as her best friend and wants things to remain exactly that way, but Shravan is not really being able to cope up with this fact.
64	"Sharvan's Mood Is Still Off"	25 August 2020
Shravan continues to remain upset about the fact that Suman considers him to be her best friend and nothing more than that. Shravan decides to not have his dinner when his mother comes with the food and asks him to eat it.
65	"Shravan Is Caught Off-Guard"	26 August 2020
Shravan's father is fumed upon his son's recent activities and wants to teach him a lesson. While getting out of the house the men collide and Shravan is caught off guard. His father is asking about his recent behaviour and claims to know the reason behind it.
66	"Shravan and Suman share a moment"	27 August 2020
Shravan and Suman share a moment during a dance session. Suman being a little hesitant leaves soon after.
67	"Shravan Gets Caught Red-Handed"	28 August 2020
Shravan's mother catches him red-handed while he was talking to himself about his feelings. Somehow, he manages to fool his mother by giving a silly excuse.
68	"Shravan's Mother Calls Up Suman"	31 August 2020
Shravan's mother calls up Suman to seek for her help, she tells her that Sharvan is in love and that girl is someone from their study group itself, after hearing this Suman reacts a bit surprised.
69	"Suman Lies To Save Her Sister"	1 September 2020
Suman's uncle somehow finds that burnt piece of paper in which it was written "I love you" and suspects that her daughter had to do something with it. Suman comes at the right time to save her sister from her father regarding this matter and lies about it that it belongs to Shravan but it is related to a play that they are taking part in.
70	"Shravan's Confession"	2 September 2020
Shravan confesses his love to Suman but has decided to stay away from him. Suman's decision has left Shravan shattered.
71	"Suman Gets A Fever"	3 September 2020
Shravan is on his way to Suman's house with the medicine. Meanwhile, Suman's sister is tensed about Suman's health and gets even more concerned when her father does not pick up her call. Shravan finds Damru outside Suman's house and gives him the medicine.
72	"Team Spirit"	4 September 2020
After receiving the punishment from Colonel Vijay, Shravan starts to do push-ups. But watching him go through this pain, Suman stops him and asks for an equal share in the punishment. Seeing this act Colonel Vijay feels proud and explains the importance of Team Spirit.
73	"Suman Finds A Picture"	7 September 2020
Suman somehow gets hold of Shravan's wallet and finds a picture of both of them together. She isn't really happy about the fact that Shravan is in love with her as she is not in love with him.
74	"Shravan's Mom Is Worried"	8 September 2020
Shravan's mother is walking to and fro in their hall waiting for her son to come back. As Shravan enters the house, he is surprised by seeing his mom awake at the time of the night. She explained that she saw a bad dream about Shravan and it woke her up. Shravan tries to calm his mother by assuring her that nothing's happened.
75	"Suman and Shravan Sort Differences"	9 September 2020
Suman and Shravan can be seen working through their differences here. Their little conversation validates the fact that they are in love. Suman asks him to reply her back, and also to slap her is Shravan wishes to.
76	"The Sleepless Nights"	10 September 2020
After declaring her love towards Shravan, Suman feels relieved and happy. As every new love birds feel both can't get enough of each other. Both keep glaring at their phone's screen and texting each other.
77	"Suman's Rendezvous with Shravan"	11 September 2020
Colonel Vijay notes Suman's absence from the class. But Suman is busy with Shravan. Both are busy playing a little game with one another. Meanwhile, Suman's sister is tensed about the situation at the home.
78	"Suman's Family Members Panic"	14 September 2020
Suman met with a small accident but at her house somehow, they all got to know about it and started to panic. When she returned home everyone asked her if she was fine and not hurt. On the other hand, Suman keeps on wondering that how did all of them got to know about all of this.
79	"Shravan's Uncle Is In Trouble"	15 September 2020
Shravan's uncle, Rajender has committed a nuisance again, which has made Suman's Dadu furious and he has decided to call the police and punish him. Shravan tries to convince them to not call the police and settle the issue within.
80	"When Things Doesn't Go Well"	16 September 2020
Shravan is extremely upset and misses Suman a lot. He has not eaten anything since the morning and when Bunty brings him his dinner he still doesn't eat.
81	"Sweet Conversations"	17 September 2020
Shravan and Suman have a sweet conversation on the phone. Bunty comes near Shravan and asks what he was talking over the phone.
82	"Shravan Panics"	18 September 2020
Shravan is panicking before entering Suman's house to meet her father but eventually, Shravan gathers some courage and meets him.
83	"Shravan Will Be Going To America"	21 September 2020
It's Shravan's birthday and he is stuck at home with his family members. Suman finds out that Shravan will be going to America soon, and after listening to this she gets upset.
84	"Kanchan Consoles Suman"	22 September 2020
Kanchan tries to console Suman who is crying, Suman's mother enters in the room and tells Suman to understand the situation.
85	"Shooting In A Nearby College"	23 September 2020
Suman's father receives a piece of news regarding a shooting in a nearby college and gets surprised. He watches the news for some more information regarding the matter.
86	"Thanking Bunty"	24 September 2020
Shravan gets Suman to his place. Bunty helps Suman get comfortable and gets her food. Shravan thanks Bunty for being an understanding friend to him.
87	"Son Of A Terrorist"	25 September 2020
Shravan gets kicked out of a home and is called as son of a terrorist. When Shravan is only worried about Suman. He hears that Suman's father is killed by his father.
88	"Shravan's Leave Gets Approved"	28 September 2020
When the cadets are talking about the bet set by Shravan. Shravan walks in with a file stating his leave and the cadet's transfer is approved.
89	"Nostalgic Shravan"	29 September 2020
Jhumri didi greets Shravan and talks about the plantation he did years back. Shravan gets happy looking at the greenery.
90	"Shravan Meets Suman"	30 September 2020
Shravan and Suman meet after a long and hard time. The two get nostalgic and miss the good old days about the times they first met.
91	"Sharvan's Old Stories"	1 October 2020
Bunty drinks with his friends and shares old stories of Shravan, as what he was like and used to do back then. Later Shravan joins and drinks along with them.
92	"Deal Is Done"	5 October 2020
Bunty helps Shravan to strike a deal for his property. Bunty wishes Shravan good luck for his physical test.
93	"The Door Is Repaired"	6 October 2020
Damru and Jumri have a short conversation about their secret marriage life. Shravan enters the room and asks Damru, "Why is he here?" He tells, Suman has sent him to repair the broken door.
94	"Bunty Gets Overjoyed"	7 October 2020
Mr. Goyal gives an advance check to Bunty for the possession of Shravan's house. Bunty tells Mr Goyal they complete the formalities soon. Jumri arrives with teacups, Bunty tells the good news to Jumri.
95	"Kanchan Comes Home"	8 October 2020
Kanchan gives a surprise to her family. She greets Suman and tells her how much she missed her.
96	"The Gift"	12 October 2020
Suman enters her room and finds Kanchan sleeping. Suman goes near Kanchan to take the gift and keep it aside, Kanchan wakes up and tells her to let it be with her. Kanchan says sorry to Suman for sleeping in her room.
97	"Veer's Surprise To Shravan"	13 October 2020
Veer tells Shravan to wait for his surprise. Veer goes inside his room. Suman appears in front of Shravan from nowhere. Veer comes with a toy in his hand and gives it to Shravan.
98	"Shravan Gets Jealous"	14 October 2020
Shravan comes out of his house and notices Suman and Vikram talking with each other. Shravan keeps staring at them and he remembers about Vikram's chat with him about a girl he likes.
99	"Suman's Lawyer"	15 October 2020
Shravan shares his past with Vikram. He learns that Vikram is Suman's lawyer. Shravan tries to leave but Vikram tells him to wait.
100	"Suman Is Upset"	16 October 2020
Suman's family is worried about the case hearing. Suman comes home and does not respond to anyone. She enters her room and looks at her father's photo and starts crying. She has lost the case.
101	"Suman Gets Angry"	19 October 2020
Shravan finds a procession approaching near his house. He finds his friends are dancing in it. Suman watches them and gets furious and goes inside her house.
102	"Vikram's Small Birthday Party"	20 October 2020
It's Veer and Vikram's birthday, and a small party have been organized for it, Shravan and Suman both of them are present, but it's understandable that they are not happy with each other's presence.
103	"Suman Is Shravan's Doctor"	21 October 2020
Vikram all of a sudden finds out from Bunty that Suman is Sharvan's doctor and is treating him regarding his shoulder. Eventually, Vikram asks Suman that why hasn't she ever informed him about this.
104	"Veer's Health Improves"	22 October 2020
Doctor checks Veer's body temperature. His mother asks the doctor about his health. The doctor tells her, he is better now. Veer requests his mother to call Shravan to play with him.
105	"Suman's Advice"	23 October 2020
Suman and her uncle are having a conversation. Beena enters the room with some red chilies. She moves her hand around Veer's head and leaves. Suman and her uncle discuss the issue regarding the house.
106	"Shravan's Surprise Visit"	26 October 2020
Beena and Shravan enters Veer's room. Veer gets happy after seeing Shravan. Shravan asks him about his health. Beena tells Kanchan to make tea for Shravan.
107	"Shravan In An Awkward Situation"	27 October 2020
Shravan talks to Bunty over the phone and tells him that it's a good opportunity to show Suman her mistakes. Shravan walks into his room in a rush and finds a girl in a towel drying her hair, which leaves him in an awkward situation and he goes out of the room immediately.
108	"Ground Rules For Shravan"	28 October 2020
Shravan's new friend Sophie, helps him in moving to Suman's place. Suman barge into Shravan's room and finds Sophie along with him, she claims that they need to establish some ground rules that needs to be followed at all times.
109	"Vikram Meets Sophie"	29 October 2020
Shravan bumps into Vikram and Suman at the tea stall and tells them that he is here with his new friend. Eventually, Shravan introduces Sophie to Vikram, but as soon as Vikram sees her, his expression changes.
110	"Bunty Calls Up Shravan"	30 October 2020
Bunty calls Shravan to ask how are things with Vikram and what happened to their dinner plan. Shravan informs that things aren't the best at Suman's place and recently her aunty scolded Suman badly.
111	"Sophie's Odd Demand"	2 November 2020
Sophie wants to put mehendi on Shravan, and stands outside his door, waiting and trying to convince him to come out, but Shravan is determined that he won't put mehendi whatsoever. On the other, Suman is upset on Vikram for not showing up for the dinner plan.
112	"Veer Learns How To Play Chess"	3 November 2020
Veer wants to learn how to play chess and goes to Shravan for help. Shravan decides to teach him how to play chess and starts explaining how the game works.
113	"Suman Ignores Shravan"	4 November 2020
Veer makes Suman and Shravan wait for him, Shravan and Suman do not bother to talk to each other and tries to ignore. When Veer is back and asks "Where they did not speak?" Suman replies sarcastically.
114	"Convincing Veer"	5 November 2020
Guneet comes to meet Amber as she wants to talk to him. Guneet goes speechless and is not able to give the news. She struggles to tell Guneet the truth.
115	"A Different Side Of Shravan"	6 November 2020
Vikram gets excited and amazed at the same time after seeing Shravan's telescope. Shravan tells them about how he fell in love with the stars and planets and started to read about them.
116	"When There's Nothing Much To Say"	9 November 2020
Shravan has gone to see Suman for his check-up regarding his shoulder, both of them remain silent but keeps on thinking about their past encounters.
117	"Suman Goes To The Sangeet"	10 November 2020
Suman and Vikram has finally arrived at the Sangeet ceremony, there she meets Shravan's sister, Avni, and introduces her to Vikram. Later, Suman watches Shravan and Sophie dance together. Suman's mind is heart broken when Shravan says that his mission may be the last one.
118	"Suman Misses Her Father"	11 November 2020
Suman thinks about what Shravan has told her the other day and gets upsets about it. She also misses her father badly and writes down her feelings in her personal diary.
119	"Shravan Gets A Call From His Father"	12 November 2020
Shravan gets a call from his father and wonders that, what if his father asks him about where he was staying all these days, but instead his father just asks him to check his WhatsApp.
120	"Current Situation Between Sophie And Shravan"	13 November 2020
Avni very smartly and politely asks Sophie about what is the current situation between her and Shravan. Sophie claims that there is definitely something special between them, but she is not sure about how much interest does Shravan has in her.
121	"Gifts For Everyone"	16 November 2020
Suman's uncle has got gifts for everyone on the occasion of Dhanteras. After distributing the gifts to everyone, her uncle pretends to forget Suman's gift, but eventually gives away the gift which he has got for her.
122	"Old Memories"	17 November 2020
Shravan finds Suman's personal diary in her room, as he lifted the cover of the diary he saw a phrase written, which reminded him of an old memory with Suman.
123	"Diwali Celebrations"	18 November 2020
On the occasion of Diwali, everyone is dressed up and involved in the decoration of the house. While Veer is irritating Suman, she appreciates Jiju and his looks.
124	"Shravan Can't Get Over Suman"	19 November 2020
It's the Diwali party and there is happiness all around. But Shravan is lost in his thoughts of yesteryears. He still misses the good times spent with Suman and can’t seem to get over his emotions, related to their once inseparable bond.
125	"The Wait"	20 November 2020
Suman has been waiting to talk to Shravan regarding something for a while now, but every time she gets a chance to talk to him, somehow the situation changes and she could never say what she wants to.
126	"Suman's Mixed Feelings About Shravan"	23 November 2020
Suman writes down all of her feelings in her secret diary about Shravan. She wonders why would Shravan come back into her life all of a sudden and what does he actually want from his own life.
127	"The Last 7 Years"	24 November 2020
Avni catches Damru and Jhumri red-handed, but she gives them an offer that if they tell her everything that has happened between Suman and Shravan in the last 7 years in detail, then she will not reveal their little secret to anyone.
128	"Suman Remembers The Good Times"	25 November 2020
Suman and her friend return home bringing a packet full of Snacks for everyone. She stops by Shravan's bedroom thinking about him. She keeps a packet in the kitchen realizing that her friend didn't get snacks for Shravan which reminds Suman of her past memories.
129	"The Case Paper"	26 November 2020
Suman signs a paper regarding the cases which were going on against Shravan's father, yet feels upset about something and starts thinking about how rigid she was while filing the case earlier.
130	"Suman Wants To Know For Sure"	27 November 2020
Suman wants to talk to Shravan about their feelings for each other. As Suman still loves and feels for Shravan, but she has to know for sure that if Shravan feels the same for her or not and then only she'll be sure if she would continue her relationship with Vikram at all.
131	"Suman Misinterprets"	30 November 2020
Suman from a distance watches Shravan hugging and talking to Sophie, but she interprets it in a different sense altogether.
132	"Suman Thinks About The Past"	1 December 2020
Suman seats alone in a room and remembers her past with Shravan how they were together and had such lovely times, but then she also thinks about how things have changed.
133	"Suman Takes Away The Case"	2 December 2020
Suman Meets Vikram and tells him to take away the case which was against Shravan. Vikram gets shocked hearing this and recalls the past where Suman had told him to not take the case back at any cost.
134	"Bunty's Suggestion"	3 December 2020
Shravan confesses his love in front of his best friend Bunty. Bunty suggests him not to wait anymore and confess his love to Suman.
135	"Vikram Proposes Suman"	4 December 2020
Vikaram proposes to Suman in front of everyone and asks her to marry him. Shravan gets sad listening to it and Suman is left with no option but to accept Vikram's proposal.
136	"Suman Helps Out Shravan"	7 December 2020
Shravan thanks Suman for accepting his request regarding medical certificates. To which Suman replies that it is her duty and responsibility to look after these things and not favor him.
137	"Suman Injured Her Leg"	8 December 2020
Suman has injured her leg and the doctor has asked her to rest for at least 10 days and that if she puts any pressure on her leg then she might have to go through an operation as well.
138	"Shravan Misses His Flight"	9 December 2020
Shravan has missed his flight and has returned back to Suman's house. As he enters his room he sees Vikram there, he tells him that, he can go to a hotel and spent the night but Vikram insists him not go to a hotel and informs him about Suman's leg injury.
139	"Guest List Preparations On"	10 December 2020
In the previous episode, as Shravan has missed his flight, there is the preparation going at Suman's place. Everyone is happy and prepares the guest list. Shravan enters the hall where everyone is present. Members of the family talk about how Shravan was the naughtiest kid amongst all.
140	"An Intimate Moment"	13 December 2020
Shravan and Suman share an intimate moment, as they were about to kiss, the Doctor and her aunt arrives to check on her as she has hurt her injured leg yet again.
141	"Shravan Gifts Suman A Present"	14 December 2020
Shravan brings a gift for Suman to congratulate for her engagement ceremony. Suman opens it and sees a beautiful memory frame which makes her recall a day when they celebrated a "happy Wednesday day". She smiles remembering it.
142	"Vikram Arrives At The Ceremony"	15 December 2020
Vikram along with his parents arrive at the ceremony, where Suman's uncle and aunt welcome them very graciously. Vikram later on asks his going-to-be sister-in-law about Suman, as he was not being able to see her.
143	"Suman Is Still Hesitant"	16 December 2020
Suman is all ready and has come downstairs where the ceremony is being held to meet and greet everyone. She is still in a dilemma and is hesitant about the whole thing with Vikram.
144	"Suman Takes The Call"	17 December 2020
It's Suman's engagement day. As the ceremony is about to start, she cries her heart out because she realizes that she is in love with Shravan. So she tells Vikram to break off the engagement.
145	"Shravan Becomes Emotional"	18 December 2020
Shravan panics when he sees Suman's phone call, after receiving the call he gets emotional and starts blaming himself for everything and that is when Suman asks her to calm down.
146	"Shravan Remorse About The Situation"	21 December 2020
Shravan is upset about everything that happened and at the moment when he is drinking a glass of beer, he pours out all his emotions and expresses the attachment towards Suman in front of his friend.
147	"Kancha Blames Shravan"	22 December 2020
Kancha tries to convince Suman that Shravan could have done something in order to not let his family buy the Tiwari house. Suman stays silent and does not say much, later she tells Kacha that whenever she is met with such difficult situations, she wonders how would her father deal with it.
148	"Shravan Is In Cloud Nine"	23 December 2020
Shravan is extremely happy and goes on thinking about Suman. When Bunty arrives and asks him about what happened regarding the Tiwari house, he explains it to him and then continues talking about how much he loves Suman.
149	"Suman Tricks Damru Bhaiya"	24 December 2020
Suman Calls Damru bhaiya upstairs on the terrace to clear the clothes that were hung on. Damru gets trapped and clears all, Suman schemes Damru to do so that she can see Shravan through that space. Damru is baffled by Suman's changed behavior.
150	"Shravan Hides From His Father"	25 December 2020
Shravan stops to buy some flowers for Suman, that is when he notices his father's car coming towards his direction. Shravan and Suman, both of them hide behind a tree but Shravan forgets to hide his bike. His father notices the bike while driving and stops to find him.
151	"Kanchan Is Hurt"	3 December 2020
Kancha finds out about Suman and Shravan, and also that they will be marrying each other. Kancha is extremely upset as she thinks that Suman was never going to let her know about everything that's been going on between them, and blames Suman for it.
152	"Shravan's Father Doubts Him"	29 December 2020
Shravan's father suspects something fishy is going on, so he asks him to call Bunty from his mobile. Bunty seeing Shravan's call gets excited and without listening to who is on the other side he starts talking about the insurance thing which he was supposed to take care of, but Shravan's father hears everything.
153	"Shravan's Cooking Skills"	30 December 2020
While Shravan cooks in the kitchen, his mother comes in to tease him for his cooking skill. Shravan tells his maid and everyone to not help him with anything and enjoy the food when it's ready.
154	"Shravan's Gets Upset"	31 December 2020
Shravan gets mad as his maid informs him that the food he sent to Suman had been thrown away and hence Suman couldn't eat it. This makes him worried about their relationship. So he calls Suman and yells at her.
155	"Suman - Shravan's Little Difficulties In Love"	1 January 2021
Suman is waiting for Shravan to come and meet but unfortunately, Shravan's dad drives him along and they couldn't meet. Shravan sees Suman through the object mirror and thinks of some ideas in his mind in order to meet her.
156	"Suman - The Chef For Today"	4 January 2021
Suman makes Gajar ka halwa for everyone as she wants to cook today. Damru asks for help but because it's her special recipe, she doesn't allow anyone to help her with cooking.
157	"Suman Is Upset With Shravan"	5 December 2021
Suman is upset with Shravan and calls him over a video call to talk to him. Shravan while answering the call is happy to talk to her but Suman is a bit upset since Shravan did not call her to inform his arrival at the camp. Shravan in return makes her happy by promising such incidents will never happen again.
158	"Shravan Gets Ready"	6 January 2021
Blasting sound is heard by Sharavan and his batch. Senior comes in and asks Shravan and his batch to be ready with his team to proceed towards this place, he adds that the previous search team passed the message of high risk for the same. On the other hand, Suman is waiting for Shravan's reply to the dress that she curiously wants him to check.
159	"Wedding Day Excitement"	7 January 2021
As Suman packs her bag and gets ready to go as it's her wedding. A nurse comes in and informs her about Captain Sharad. Suman refers him to Dr. Dikshit to examine him.
160	"Shravan Confirms His Father's Words"	8 January 2021
Shravan does not appear as his father claims that he will never disobey. Further his father clears not to believe all the fake information and stop making fool of themselves in front of everyone.
161	"Suman Recalls Sweet Memories"	11 January 2021
Suman recalls her memories with Shravan wherein an incident she by mistake hits Shravan on and his pack of eatables is dropped.
162	"Suman's Request To Shravan's Mom"	12 January 2021
Suman promises to Shravan's mom that once she takes the injection she will never meet Shravan and go away from his life.
163	"Shravan's Frustration"	13 January 2021
As Tiwari family is smiling over delicious dessert delicacies Shravan rings the doorbell. He looks disturbed and wants to meet Suman. He proceeds upstairs to meet her.
164	"Suman's Happy Day"	14 January 2021
Suman is happy and wants to tell Shravan about the approval of their marriage by her family. But as she finishes her practice there is another patient lined up urgently.
165	"Beginnings Of Auspicious Events"	15 January 2021
It's time to send auspicious greetings which are to be carried by Malhotra's to the Tiwari's house. Shravan's uncle and aunt are handed the responsibility to take care of the gifts and all other packages that they are supposed to carry while Kavita makes sure there are no mistakes with the list as it's her son's Shagun.
166	"Shravan and Suman's Badminton Practice"	18 January 2021
Shravan helps Suman with her training for the Inter Regiment Badminton Championship . Meanwhile, Shravan's family is preparing for their son's lavish wedding .
167	"Major Suman Tiwari"	19 January 2021
Another cause of celebration has been added to the list, with Suman being promoted to the rank of Major. Shravan throws a grand party upon hearing this news, meanwhile awaiting his own promotion as well.
168	"Shravan's Last Kept Secret"	20 January 2021
The fact that Shravan bought a house under Suman's name has finally come to light . What complications will this new problem cause between two families .
169	"Shravan Ki Mehandi Ka Rang"	21 January 2021
Shravan get angry at Suman when she ignores his affectionate advances. Meanwhile, Malhotras and Tiwaris celebrate the mehandi function in a grandiose manner.
170	"Suman's Prank Backfires"	22 January 2020
Kanchan and Suman play a prank on Shravan, but it doesn't seem to go down well with Shravan's mother. Will this small moment of fun, cause big problems for the two lovers?
171	"Beena Feels Disappointed"	25 January 2021
Suman's aunt is distributing the holy offerings between the guests and finds out that one of Shravan's relatives is drunk. She feels disappointed about the same and requests her husband to meet her aside to have a discussion over it. Kavita feels something is wrong with their actions.
172	"Shravan - Suman's Marriage Procession"	26 January 2021
Shravan is on his way to receive the Bride with his family. Suman on the other hand is excited and looks at the procession from her balcony while waving at Shravan. Suman's sister notices that the groom is not wearing the outfit that Suman's aunt had given and is wearing a different one and now she thinks this might be a step towards unwanted arguments.
173	"Minor Inconvenience At The Wedding"	27 January 2021
Shravan's Parents and Mamaji are waiting for the power cut problem to be solved. But it is taking a bit longer and Mamaji starts to criticize the arrangements. But it hardly takes any time and the electricity issue is resolved and Shravan and his friends are back to the joyful mood of the wedding.
174	"Shravan - Suman Married"	28 January 2021
Suman is finally the wife of Shravan and is now entering the Malhotra house with all the rituals as a daughter in law to Shravan's parents.
175	"Shravan Encourages Suman"	29 January 2021
Shravan motivates Suman to concentrate on the game as it is her last training session. Suman is upset with Shravan as he wouldn't be around her during her final match.
176	"Suman Gets Greetings"	1 February 2021
Suman gets back to work and is working as a medical practitioner at the camp. One of her fellow colleagues from the camp congratulates her for her wedding as well as promotion. He also asks about Shravan to which she replies that he is now Major Shravan. Meanwhile, one female fellow colleague comes with some information.
177	"Suman's Uneasiness"	2 February 2021
Suman is on a picnic as decided by Mr. Gujral earlier and everyone is enjoying it as well. But she starts feeling uneasy and decides to go home. Upon getting this news her senior questions her regarding the same and she replies with a positive answer.
178	"Suman's Concern For Shravan's Act"	3 February 2021
Suman wants Shravan to clear his reason for being upset when he reached home. Shravan in return tries to riddle up things but Suman plays sweet mischief as well.
179	"Suman's Efforts To Understand Shravan"	4 February 2021
As they come back from a party, Suman initiates the conversation about Shravan's posting as he wants an on-field posting which did not happen. But Shravan denies to talk over it.
180	"Shravan Expresses His Feelings To Bunty"	5 February 2021
Shravan and Bunty meet over a cup of tea. Bunty wants Shravan to speak about everything that is bothering him. But Shravan says that he was just upset with the posting thing and nothing else. But Bunty is further not satisfied with his answer.
181	"Suman's Plan Of Surprise Party"	8 February 2021
Kanchan asks Suman regarding wishing her mother for her birthday. Suman denies doing so and wants to plan a surprise birthday party for her aunt while keeping it as Suman is unaware of her birthday and forgot the special date.
182	"Shravan Is Disappointed Due To Suman's Absence"	9 February 2021
As planned earlier both the families are gathered for the birthday party of Beena. But the planner herself Suman is missing as she is stuck with some work at the camp. She calls Shravan and asks him to handle things and tells him the reason for not being able to arrive, but Shravan is a bit angry with her.
183	"Shravan Asks Suman's Favour"	10 February 2021
As Shravan is asked to talk to Suman about a push for the posting of Shravan's senior in front of one of the top hierarchy, Suman seems to be in shock when Shravan asks to do the same from Suman.
184	"Suman Tries To Solve Avni's Worries"	11 February 2021
Avni is relaxing on the lawn but immersed in thoughts. Suman joins her with a pleasant cup of coffee for both whiles trying to understand what is going on with her and the reason behind her refusal for marriage, to which Avni replies that she does not want to get married yet.
185	"Shravan Realises About His Selfish Behaviour"	12 February 2021
Shravan and Bunty are talking over a cup of tea at the cafe. Shravan shares his reasons for looking upset and states that he used to think that he knows Suman inside out but he seems to be wrong. He also adds that Suman had her principles prioritized on top but he seems to be false with that thought as well.
186	"Shravan May Have Some Plan For Suman"	15 February 2021
Suman wakes up in the morning and finds that Shravan is all dressed and ready to go somewhere, but he doesn't tell her anything except just asks her to get ready quickly and come downstairs.
187	"Shravan love Suman"	16 February 2021
Suman wakes up in the morning and finds that Shravan is all dressed and ready to go somewhere, but he doesn't tell her anything except just asks her to get ready quickly and come downstairs.
188	"Suman Writes Down Her Feelings"	17 February 2021
Suman is writing the journey in her diary in which she describes that how unlucky she used to feel for all the negative things happening in her life. But after taking the vow with Shravan she feels the luckiest and she loves him the most.
189	"Suman Chooses A Design For Carpet"	18 February 2021
Suman is scrolling through her phone and chooses a design for the carpet of their room which is a combination of both Suman and Shravan's taste of choice. While Shravan is busy working out he takes a look on insisting by Suman and there happens a sweet argument over the same.
190	"Suman's Support For Avani"	19 February 2021
Avani is asked for her decision regarding getting married at the dinner table. Suman supports Avani as she seems nervous regarding this and helps dodge the marriage topic and asks for some time to pursue her career. Watch the full episode while everyone supports the decision stated by Suman.
191	"Suman Tells Shravan About Avani"	22 February 2021
Suman and Shravan are spending their time in the room while Shravan talks about understanding Suman and supporting her. Suman also shows her support while upholds her responsibility to share everything with her husband. Hence she finally discloses Avani's truth to him.
192	"Suman - Shravan's Sweet Arguments"	23 February 2021
Shravan gets a boxing kit for himself and sets it up in the terrace area. Suman sees and tells him that as discussed earlier she will first get plants, and then together they'll set these things up. To which, Shravan says that he needs to work on his forearms and coordination prior. Aren't they cute?
193	"Suman And Avani's Synergy"	24 February 2021
Suman is just awake and gets a door-knock. Avani comes in and gives her some surprising news that Shravan has woken up earlier and is already off for jogging, while the plants that Suman has ordered are received and Avani and Jhumri di will take care of placing them.
194	"Shravan And Avani's Mysterious Plan"	25 February 2021
Shravan is yet not awake while Suman is all ready to go for a jog. She asks Shravan to wake up as he is also looking after his fitness recently for the competition, but he denies it as he is asleep and includes rest as a part of his fitness regime and hence Suman leaves alone. But is Shravan really asleep?
195	"Suman At Bed Rest For A Week"	26 February 2021
Suman met with an accident in her room previously and injured her leg. On getting it checkup up it turns out to be a muscular strain and the doctor advised her to take complete rest for a week. Suman feels sad as she has her competition lined up for the next day.
196	"Suman Plays Despite Injury"	1 March 2021
Suman was advised for bed rest until a week after the injury. But she denies rest and appears on the badminton court for the competition to save her regiment from any casualties. Watch as Suman struggles to even walk normally how will she play the competition?
197	"Suman's Dedication For The Competition"	2 March 2021
As Suman gets injured while playing in the competition, her mom gets worried and advises her to not take any kind of health risk. Everyone gathers and converse with her for being so enthusiastic about the match and not looking after herself. Thereafter, Suman asks for her aunt and tells everyone to not notify her about her injury.
198	"Special Greetings For Suman"	3 March 2021
Suman performed really well at the badminton competition to which she has special congratulation wishes from her senior who personally visited her house. The senior makes Suman feel proud of her father as he says some kind words for him.
199	"Suman's Injury Intensifies"	4 March 2021
The doctor checks up on Suman's health as she played the match despite the injury. Because of which the injury has taken more intense form and it might lead her to get admitted to the hospital as well. But Suman has something else running in her mind.
200	"Shravan's Match"	5 March 2021
Shravan's head is pissed with his behavior. Suman and their family decide to watch the match together, so they call Shravan's friend to show it via video call. On the other side, Suman plans to fast until Shravan wins.
201	"Avani's Date With Ayaan"	8 March 2021
Shravan and Suman discuss Avani's story to which Shravan needs some more time to approve Ayaan as Avani's partner. Meanwhile, Avani convinces Suman to get her permission for staying out for long as she has a date planned with Ayaan. But while leaving Avani is stopped by Shravan as he wants to drop her himself. What will happen next?
202	"Shravan's Anger Over Avani"	9 March 2021
Shravan and Suman sort things out between them and assure each other to be back to normal and eventually decide to meet at home. But Shravan gets to know something about Avani from his fellow officer at the camp and rushes home and asks Avani and Ayaan along with Suman to meet him at his room as he looks furious. Meanwhile, Kanchan looks insecure with Bunty.
203	"Will Shravan Disapprove Ayaan?"	10 March 2021
Shravan hears the conversation between Avani and Ayaan which makes him furious and Shravan out of anger slaps Ayaan. This makes Ayaan feel insulted and leave. Avani seems disappointed by this act because it was her decision to keep things hidden and not Ayaan's. Meanwhile, Kanchan's parents are heading out as Kanchan has helped with the cab booking.
204	"Shravan's Apology"	11 March 2021
Suman is upset with Shravan's unsupportive behavior towards Avani's love story. Shravan Apologizes to her for getting angry with her. Suman makes him understand to stand by his sister and not against her. Shravan goes to Avani to make her understand that how Aayan isn't right for her and how he couldn't take a stand when he had to. But Avani doesn't listen to him and instead gets mad at him. What will Shravan do now?
205	"It's A Yes For Avani - Ayaan"	12 March 2021
Ayaan comes to Avani's house and expresses his feelings for her in front her everyone. Seeing Ayaan taking a stand for their love makes Shravan happy. Everyone is happy about it. Avani goes to Suman and thanks her for being such supportive. Shravan then, apologies to Suman for behaving wrongly towards her. But Suman refuse to accept his apology. Will Suman forgive him?
206	"Kanchan's Special Preparations"	15 March 2021
It's Bunty's birthday party and Shravan has planned a surprise party for him. On the other hand, Kanchan is preparing for something really special for Bunty but she portrays that she is unaware of his birthday and Bunty feels bad over the same. Now Kanchan again calls Bunty and cancels the plan of meeting as well.
207	"Shravan And Bunty's Friendship"	16 March 2021
Shravan has pranked on Bunty as he enacted like he is not aware of his birthday. And Bunty is invited by Kanchan to her place for his surprise birthday gift. But everything gets a bit messed and eventually the special moment of Kanchan and Bunty has been delayed as Shravan calls Bunty to his grand party that he has organized for Bunty's birthday.
208	"It's Bunty's Birthday"	17 March 2021
On this special day, Kanchan and Bunty express their feelings for each other. As they confess, Suman and Shravan overhear them. Shravan supports Bunty while Suman falls into confusion regarding Kanchan's choice.
209	"Avani And Ayaan Together Forever"	18 March 2021
Ayaan and his parents visit Shravan's house to finally discuss and finalize the dates for further proceedings of Avani and Ayaan's Marriage. Suman and Shravan are still not able to keep things normal as Kanchan and Bunty's relation is bothering Suman. Meanwhile, Bunty and Kanchan decide over something important.
210	"Bunty - Kanchan's Love"	19 March 2021
Suman and Shravan converse with their family about Bunty and Kanchan's relationship. Avani talks about the differences between them but Suman and Shravan explain to her that love doesn't see any differences. Here, on the other side, Bunty and Kanchan express their love for each other. watch the full episode now.
211	"Rift in Suman and Shravan's Relationship"	22 March 2021
Kanchan's parents are not convinced about her and Bunty's marriage. This causes a major rift in Suman and Shravan's relationship. Meanwhile, Kanchan tries her best to convince her mother.
212	"Shravan Misses Suman"	23 March 2021
Shravan and Suman's Equations fall down as they face certain issues. Suman stayed at her place all night which creates misunderstandings in Shravan's mind so he messages Suman in anger. Later he gets to know that she was busy with her some kinds of stuff and she had informed Shravan about it. What will happen when Suman checks his messages?
213	"Shravan Trust"	24 March 2021
Shravan and Suman seem to grow apart, but they still miss each other. Suman has shifted back to her house and doesn't feel like going back to Shravan's house. Will Shravan be able to bring Suman back into his life?
214	"The Change Behavior Between The Two"	25 March 2021
Suman notices the change in herself as she writes down a letter. She misses Shravan and their most beautiful memories. Kanchan enters the room and asks Suman the truth behind her changed behavior. But she refuses to answer. On the hand other, Bunty makes Shravan understand and they both try to resolve the issues. what will happen?
215	"Shravan Guilt"	26 March 2021
Shravan and Suman think about how the differences between them are constantly growing. Shravan has taken a holiday from duty in order to help with Avani's wedding arrangements.
216	"Suman Is Back"	29 March 2021
Suman is back in the house to help with Avani's wedding preparations. However, she still feels uncomfortable, standing in the room as Shravan. Meanwhile, Bunty calls Kanchan for an emergency meeting.
217	"Kanchan Is Upset"	30 March 2021
While everyone is planning Avani's wedding functions, they tell Shravan to call Suman and book for a wedding decorator. Suman gets worried as she hears Shravan's throat ache noise. Shravan feels bliss when he sees Suman caring for him. And, their conversation turns back to normal. Thereafter, when she gets to know that Shravan has been calling for work-related, her mood gets spoil. The next morning, Kanchana gets upset about Bunty, to which Suman finds a solution for it.
218	"Suman - Shravan Are Back"	31 March 2021
The differences between them are cleared, the issues have been resolved. There begins a beautiful morning where Suman and Shravan are back together to be never apart again. On the other hand, there is a school reunion party for which they're excited. Kanchan along with her new fiancé Bunty and Shravan along with Suman leaves for the reunion of friends in the Army School remembering their school days. And with that the beautiful TV Show ends.

== Soundtrack ==
No.	Title	Length
1.	"Ek Duje Ke Vaaste Title Song 1"	1:59
2.	"Ek Duje Ke Vaaste Title Song 2"	1:35

== Production ==
=== Development and casting ===
When discussing the creation of a new version of Ek Duje Ke Vaaste, producer Dilip Jha said, "The response that we had received for Ek Duje Ke Vaaste was extremely overwhelming. The audience reception made us bring back season 2 of the show. But, it's with a different cast and a completely new twist in the story. The entire show will be shot in Bhopal, for which we have received great support from Madhya Pradesh Tourism."

=== Filming and airing ===
The production and airing of the show was halted indefinitely in late March 2020 due to the COVID-19 outbreak in India. Because of the outbreak, the filming of television series and films was halted in late March 2020 and expected to resume on 1 April 2020 but could not and the series was last broadcast on 31 March 2020 when the remaining episodes were aired. After three months, the production and filming of the series resumed in June 2020 and airing to resume from 20 July 2020.

The series started streaming exclusively on SonyLIV from 28 September 2020 to make way for Kaun Banega Crorepati 12 on Sony Entertainment Television.

== Reception ==
Telly Updates described the show as "promising", giving it 3 out of 5 stars.

Mid-day.com also praised the show and listed five reasons to watch it.
