= Alka Kaushal =

Indian actress and producer

- Born: Alka Badola; Delhi, India
- Occupations: Actress; Producer
- Years active: 1994–present
- Spouse: Ravi G. Kaushal
- Children: 1
- Relatives: Varun Badola (brother)

Alka Badola Kaushal is an Indian actress and producer, known for her work in Bollywood. She is also popular for her roles in TV shows such as Kumkum – Ek Pyara Sa Bandhan and Qubool Hai. She has played supportive roles in numerous Hindi TV serials, mainly negative characters or vamps. She played the role of Sushma Oberoi in Mose Chhal Kiye Jaaye.

== Personal life ==
Kaushal is the eldest of three children born to stage artist Vishwa Mohan S. Badola and Susheela Badola. She had attended the National School of Drama Repertory in her hometown Delhi, and later moved to Mumbai to pursue a career on Indian television. She is married to TV producer and director, Ravi G. Kaushal; the couple have started their own production house, Mangalam Arts.

In 2017, the actress and her mother were sent for two years to Sangrur district jail after the Sangrur (Punjab) court upheld the two-year jail term given to the television actress and her mother in a cheque-bounce case by a lower court. Alka and her mother had borrowed Rs.50 lakh from farmer Avtar Singh, to make a serial and gave him two cheques of Rs 25 lakh each which bounced and so he raised a case at a local court in Malerkotla in 2015, which sentenced the two to two years' imprisonment. She was released from prison in 2018.

== Acting career ==
She made her television debut with Ramesh Sippy's Gathaand and later acted in Tum Pukar Lo, Manzilein Apni Apni and Prratima. Kaushal has worked in serials like Faasle, 9 Malabar Hill, Sansar, Kartavya and Kammal. She is also seen in Zee TV's serial Qubool Hai. She was out of Qubool Hai for six months. She has acted in Swaragini - Jodein Rishton Ke Sur as Parvati Gadodia and Tarkeshwari Singh/Tharka Bua on Sarojini. In July and November 2020, She played Sita Choudhary in Yeh Rishta Kya Kehlata Hai and Tara Bai in Colors TV's Barrister Babu respectively.

Since December 2020, she is playing Devi Sabherwal in Shaurya Aur Anokhi Ki Kahani.

== Filmography ==
=== Television ===
Year	Serial	Role
2002–2003	Kammal	
2002–2007	Kumkum – Ek Pyara Sa Bandhan	Sukanya Wadhwa
2004–2005	Prratima	Asha Dharmesh Thakur
2009–2010	Jyoti	Choti Maa
2011–2012	Don't Worry Chachu	
2012–2015	Qubool Hai	Razia Gafoor Ahmed Siddiqui
2014	Hamari Sister Didi	Mrs. Kapoor
2015–2016	Swaragini – Jodein Rishton Ke Sur	Parvati Deendayal Gadodia
2016	Sarojini	Tarkeshwari Singh
2017	Santoshi Maa	Kranti Maa
2018	Woh Apna Sa	Ambika Khanna
2019	Bahu Begum	Ghazala Mirza
2019	Shaadi Ke Siyape	Fancy
2020	Yeh Rishta Kya Kehlata Hai	Sita Choudhury
2020	Nazar 2	Narmada Choudhary
2020	Barrister Babu	Tara Bai
2020–2021	Shaurya Aur Anokhi Ki Kahani	Devi Tej Sabharwal
2021	Choti Sarrdaarni	Rimple Babbar
2022	Mose Chhal Kiye Jaaye	Sushma Harshvardhan Oberoi
2023	Jyoti... Umeedon Se Sajee	Kaveri
2023–2024	Rabb Se Hai Dua	Hamida Ibrahim Siddiqui
2025–present	Anupamaa	Vasundhara Kothari

=== Films ===
Year	Film	Role	Notes
2014	Queen	as Mrs. Mehra	
2015	Dharam Sankat Mein	as Dharam Pal's wife	
2015	Bajrangi Bhaijaan	as Bhavana Pandey	
2018	Veere Di Wedding	as Mrs. Santosh Bhandari	
2018	Soorma	as Tapsee mother	
2018	Badhaai Ho	as Ayushmann Khurrana's Aunt (Gudan bhua)	
2020	Indoo Ki Jawani	as Indoo's Mother	
2022	Double XL	as Rajshri's Mother	
2024	Khel Khel Mein	as Veena Khanna	

=== As producer ===
- Meet Mila De Rabba
- Kho Gayi Manzilein… Kho Gayi
- Naya Daur
- Saturday Suspense
- Thriller @ 10
