= Mose Chhal Kiye Jaaye =

Indian romance thriller soap

- Genre: Drama
- Created by: Sumeet Hukamchand Mittal; Shashi Mittal
- Screenplay by: Isha Sharma; Rohit Malhotra
- Story by: RM Joshi; Supriya Bhasin
- Directed by: Vikram V Labhe
- Creative director: Neha Kothari
- Starring: See below
- Country of origin: India
- Original language: Hindi
- No. of episodes: 127

Production
- Producers: Sumeet Mittal; Shashi Mittal; Jitendra Singla
- Production location: Mumbai
- Editor: Sonu Kumar Gupta
- Running time: 20-25 Minutes
- Production company: Shashi Sumeet Productions

Original release
- Network: Sony Entertainment Television
- Release: 7 February – 5 August 2022

Mose Chhal Kiye Jaaye is an Indian romance thriller television serial produced by Sumeet Mittal and Shashi Mittal under Shashi Sumeet Productions and stars Vidhi Pandya and Vijayendra Kumeria. The show premiered between 7 February 2022 to 5 August 2022 on Sony TV and digitally streams on SonyLIV.

== Premise ==
It is the story of a girl named Saumya who dreams of becoming a writer and wants to work even after marriage. But her marriage is fixed with Armaan Oberoi, a famous TV producer who promises her to make a career but the reality hits different.

== Plot ==
The show revolves around the story of a young passionate aspiring writer – Saumya Verma, who hails from a small city with big dream. Dreams to one day pen down stories for the ever-evolving Television industry but later Saumya marries Armaan Oberoi, a famous TV Producer who pretends himself a supporter of Women Empowerment but in reality he was against of it. After marrying Saumya, Armaan makes her emotional and makes her do all his work and deceives her, but Saumya does not stop, once her story is selected for a TV show, knowing that Armaan gets irritated and makes her emotional again, the author of his story himself. Later on, there was a dispute between the two on this matter, on which Armaan tried to raise his hand on Saumya, after which Saumya stopped his hand and started leaving the Oberoi house, when Armaan's mother Sushma fell from the ladder, due to which Saumya couldn't leave. After few days, Saumya becomes pregnant and Armaan apologizes to her and makes her happy again. But Preesha, Saumya's maternal cousin who wanted to marry Armaan but couldn't because of Saumya, once again tries to get Armaan for which she meets Armaan everyday on the pretext of a job in Armaan's company and tries to lure him to her side. Saumya gets betrayed by Armaan and Preesha. Later she gives birth to twins, Jashn and Jahan, but Armaan takes them away and forbids Saumya from seeing them. Through various methods, she is able to give her milk for the kids. Armaan and Saumya fight a custody battle where Armaan and his father, Dr. Harshvardhan Oberoi forge Saumya's medical reports, stating she is harmful to the kids. The custody is given to Armaan and Saumya is sent to a mental health centre and cannot meet her kids until she's better.

=== 5 Years Later ===
Saumya is released from the mental ward and vows to get her children back. After meeting them, she learns they don't know her and consider Preesha as their mother. Preesha, feeling insecure, brainwashes the kids against Saumya with Armaan's help. Armaan, on the other hand, learns that he needs Saumya's novel's rights to retain his public image and get out of debt. Saumya plays with his mind and does the same things to him that he previously did to her. Preesha is angry at Armaan being close to Saumya for his work but is soon told to leave the Oberoi house after she realizes his true colours. Later, Armaan hides his sons to blackmail Saumya and take over her money but later all know his intentions & he goes to jail. Saumya asks Goldie to bail him out for the sake of their kids. During a heated argument between Saumya and Armaan, the kids learn the truth of everything and broke their relations with Armaan. Saumya leaves the Oberoi House with her sons to an unknown place & lived happily.

== Cast ==
=== Main ===
- Vidhi Pandya as Saumya Verma (formerly Oberoi) – Malini and Girish's elder daughter; Shilpi's elder sister; Preesha's cousin; Armaan's former wife; Jashn and Jahan's mother (2022)
- Vijayendra Kumeria as Armaan Oberoi – Sushma and Harsh's son; Kashish and Mahi's brother; Saumya's former husband; Preesha's former love interest; Jashn and Jahan's father (2022)

=== Recurring ===
- Mandeep Kumar Azad as Girish Verma – Malini's husband; Saumya and Shilpi's father, Jashn and Jahan's maternal grandfather (2022)
- Gunn Kansara as Malini Verma – Saumya and Shilpi's mother, Jashn and Jahan's maternal grandmother (2022)
- Aishani Yadav as Shilpi Verma – Malini's younger daughter; Saumya's sister; Preesha's cousin. (2022)
- Garima Parihar / Avantika Hundal as Preesha – Saumya and Shilpi's cousin; Armaan's former partner and mistress; Jashn and Jahan's step-mother (2022)
- Alka Kaushal as Sushma Oberoi – Harsh's wife; Armaan, Kashish and Mahi's mother; Prince, Jashn and Jahan's paternal grandmother (2022)
- Manek Bedi as Dr. Harshvardhan "Harsh" Oberoi – Sushma's husband; Armaan, Kashish and Mahi's father; Prince, Jashn and Jahan's paternal grandfather (2022)
- Manasi Sengupta as Tara Oberoi – Prince's mother (2022)
- Ritu Chauhan as Kashish Oberoi – Sushma and Harsh's elder daughter; Armaan and Mahi's sister; Amreek's wife (2022)
- Achherr Bhaardwaj as Amreek – Kashish's husband (2022)
- Sarwar Ahuja as Goldie Seghal – A lawyer; Armaan's childhood friend (2022)
- Simran Upadhyay as Mahi Oberoi – Sushma and Harsh's younger daughter; Armaan and Kashish's sister (2022)
- Pashva Bhanushali as Prince Oberoi – Tara's son (2022)
- Nirbhay Thakur as Jashn Oberoi – Saumya and Armaan's elder son; Jahan's twin elder brother (2022)
- Alish Nathani as Jahan Oberoi – Saumya and Armaan's younger son; Jashn's younger brother (2022)
- Khushbu Thakkar as Simmi – Armaan's personal assistant. (2022)
- Radhika Vidyasagar as Saumya and Shilpi's aunt (2022)
- Vishal Gandhi as Vihaan – Saumya’s former fiancé. (2022)
- Tasneem Khan as Shaila – Armaan’s former fiancée. (2022)
- Massheuddin Qureshi as Preesha's father; Saumya and Shilpi's maternal uncle; Malini's younger brother (2022)
- Niti Kaushik as Mystery Girl (2022)
- Poonam Jangra as Advocate (2022)

== See also ==
- List of programs broadcast by Sony Entertainment Television
