= Anjali Tatrari =

Indian television actress

- Born: 21 July 1996 (age 29); Pithoragarh, Uttarakhand, India
- Occupation: Indian Television Actress
- Years active: 2018–present
- Known for: Mere Dad Ki Dulhan; Tere Bina Jiya Jaye Na; Vanshaj

Anjali Tatrari is an Indian actress who primarily works in Hindi television. She is best known for her role as Niya Sharma in Sony TV's comedy drama Mere Dad Ki Dulhan, Krisha Chaturvedi Rathore in Zee TV's drama series, Tere Bina Jiya Jaye Na and Yuvika Premraj Mahajan in Sony SAB's drama series Vanshaj.

She made her acting debut in 2018 with a minor role in Rohit Shetty film, Simmba.

== Early life ==
Anjali Tatrari was born in Pithoragarh and was brought up in Mumbai. She started working as a fashion blogger and was studying for CA before she started her acting career.

== Career ==
Tatrari made her acting and film debut in 2018 with a minor role in Simmba. She then made her web debut with the 2019 series Bhram, where she appeared as Ayesha Sayyed alongside Kalki Koechlin. She appeared alongside Emiway Bantai in the music video 'Jallad' (2019).

Anjali had her breakthrough in 2019 with her television debut Mere Dad Ki Dulhan, where she portrayed Niya Sharma opposite Vijay Tilani. It also stars Varun Badola and Shweta Tiwari. The show and cast performances received positive reviews. It went off-air in 2020.

In 2021, she appeared as Sargam Awasthi in Sargam Ki Sadhe Satii alongside Kunal Saluja. It went off-air after two months. The same year, she bagged her next show as a lead. From November 2021 to August 2022, she was seen playing Krisha Chaturvedi in Tere Bina Jiya Jaaye Na opposite Avinesh Rekhi.

Since June 2023 she is portraying Yuvika Premraj Mahajan in Sony SAB's Vanshaj.

== Filmography ==
=== Television ===
Year	Serial	Role	Ref.
2019–2020	Mere Dad Ki Dulhan	Niya Sharma	
2021	Sargam Ki Sadhe Satii	Sargam Awasthi	
2021–2022	Tere Bina Jiya Jaye Na	Krisha Singh Rathore / Maya Singh Rathore	
2023–2024	Vanshaj	Yuvika "Yuvi" Mahajan / Chinki Kaur Arora/Yukti Multani	

=== Films ===
Year	Title	Role	Ref.
2018	Simmba	Unknown	
2021	Heat	Riya	

=== Web series ===
Year	Title	Role	Ref.
2019	Bhram	Ayesha Sayyed	

=== Music videos ===
Year	Title	Singer	Ref.
2018	Sathiya	Miss RK	
2019	Jallad	Emiway Bantai	

== See also ==
- List of Indian television actresses
- List of Hindi television actresses
