= Nikhil Sachan =

Indian author

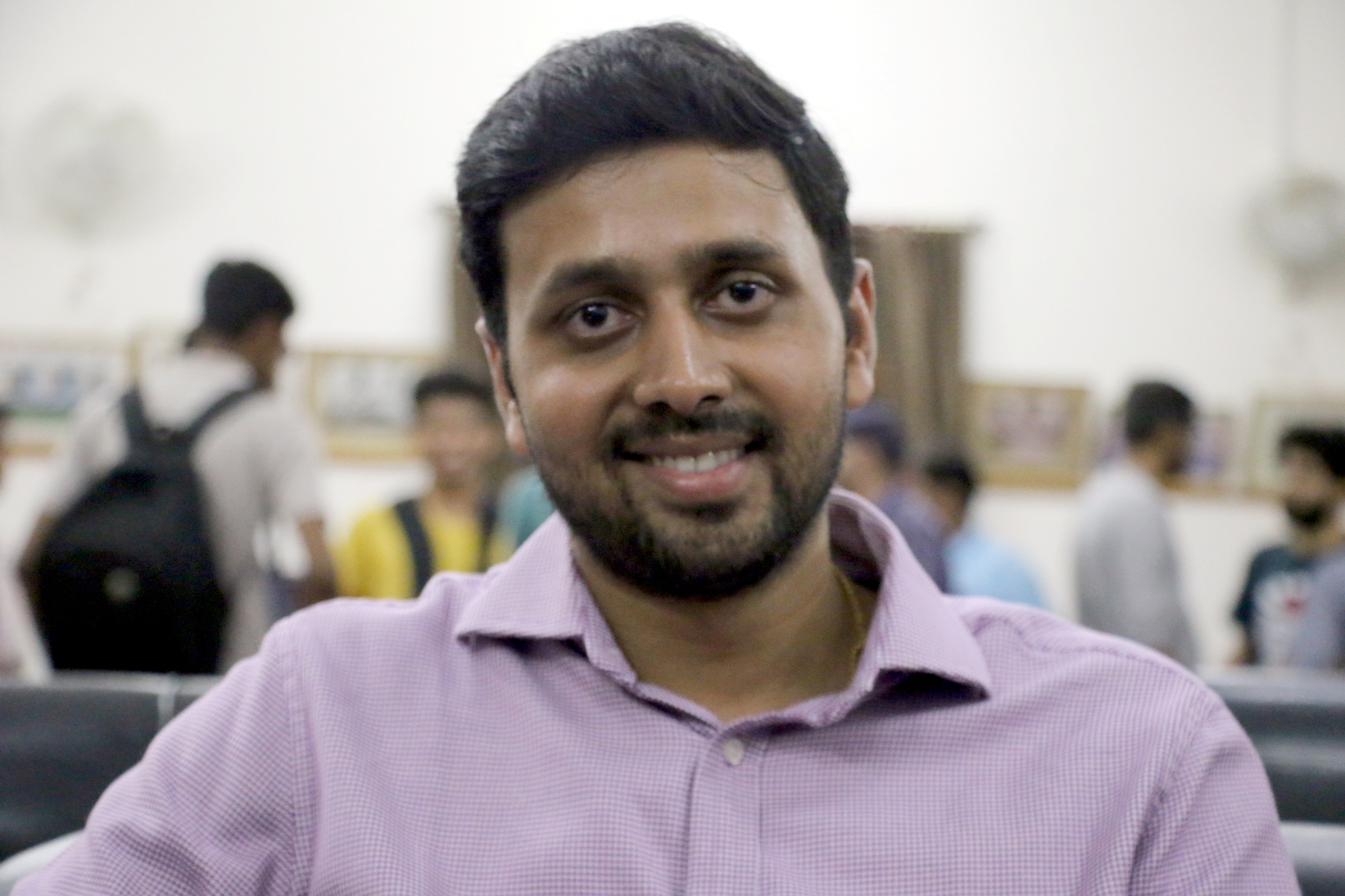
- Born: 4 August 1986 (age 40); Kanpur, Uttar Pradesh, India
- Education: Indian Institute of Technology (BHU) Varanasi
- Occupation: Writer

Nikhil Sachan (born 4 August 1986) is an Indian author and columnist. He has published two collections of short stories called Namak Swadanusar and Zindagi Aais Pais, along with a novel UP 65 (Yupi 65). He has also contributed to e-magazines The Lallantop and Firstpost.

== Personal life ==
Nikhil spent his childhood in Kanpur and studied in Pandit Deen Dayal Upadhyay School. Post his schooling he studied in the Indian Institute of Technology, Banaras Hindu University. After completing his graduation he worked for two years in Gurgaon, from 2011 to 2013 he studied Management at Indian Institute of Management, Kozhikode. As a post-graduate, he once again joined corporate life and worked in Gurgaon. In 2016 he began working with an investment management firm in Mumbai.

== Writing career ==
Nikhil's first book was a short story collection called Namak Swadanusar published in 2013. It garnered attention in many national dailies including Times of India, Open Magazine and was listed in BBC Hindi's "Top 10 Books of The Year". His second book, Zindagi Aais Paais, was another collection of short stories published in 2015, and was also met with critical acclaim. Scroll.in listed the book in "5 Books To Read in 2015" With this book, Nikhil was also featured in Outlook, and The Quint. This book was also part of Aaj Tak's "List of Best Books of 2015."

Nikhil has spoken at the Odisha Literary Festival and at the India Today Conclave on Sahitya. He has also written for Firstpost. Nikhil's third book was a full-length novel called UP 65, which was released in 2017. He is also in the process of writing scripts for Hindi films.
