= List of programmes broadcast by Colors TV =

Contents on Colors TV

The following is the list of current and former television shows broadcast by the Indian television channel Colors TV.

== Current broadcasts ==
Premiere date	Show
6 January 2025	Mannat – Har Khushi Paane Ki
17 November 2025	Tu Juliet Jatt Di
5 January 2026	Mahadev & Sons
27 January 2026	Dr. Aarambhi
8 June 2026	Bareilly Ke Bacchan
6 September 2026	Bigg Boss 20
28 September 2026	Shayad Yahi Hai Pyaar
10 October 2026	Dhammal with Pati Patni Aur Panga – Jodiyon Ka Reality Check 2
16 November 2026	Queen
28 November 2026	Dhai Chaal

== Former broadcasts ==
=== Drama ===
Year	Show	Ref.
2026	108: Base Hospital Uri	
2013–2016	24	
2010	Agnipareeksha Jeevan Ki - Gangaa	
2023	Agnisakshi…Ek Samjhauta	
2010	Aise Karo Naa Vidaa	
2024–2025	Apollena – Sapno Ki Unchi Udann	
2019–2020	Bahu Begum	
2009–2010	Bairi Piya	
2008–2016	Balika Vadhu	
2021–2022	Balika Vadhu 2	
2008–2009	Bandhan Saat Janamon Ka	
2013–2014	Bani - Ishq Da Kalma	
2020–2021	Barrister Babu	
2021	Bawara Dil	
2013–2014	Beintehaa	
2018	Bepannah	
2019–2020	Bepanah Pyaar	
2009–2011	Bhagyavidhaata	
2025–2026	Binddii – Dil Se Daring	
2023–2024	Chand Jalne Laga	
2012	Chhal — Sheh Aur Maat	
2019–2022	Choti Sarrdaarni	
2019	Court Room - Sachchai Hazir Ho	
2017–2018	Dev	
2016–2017	Devanshi	
2025	Dhaakad Beera	
2017–2018	Dil Se Dil Tak	
2026	Do Duniya Ek Dil	
2023–2025	Doree	
2024–2025	Durga – Atoot Prem Kahani	
2022–2023	Durga Aur Charu	
2016–2017	Ek Shringaar- Swabhimaan	
2022	Fanaa: Ishq Mein Marjawan	
2019	Gathbandhan	
2022	Harphoul Mohini	
2011–2012	Havan	
2018–2019	Internet Wala Love	
2015–2016	Ishq Ka Rang Safed	
2017–2019	Ishq Mein Marjawan	
2020–2021	Ishq Mein Marjawan 2	
2008–2009	Jaane Kya Baat Hui	
2008–2009	Jeevan Saathi — Humsafar Zindagi Ke	
2026	Juhi Mui	
2023	Junooniyatt	
2012	Kairi — Rishta Khatta Meetha	
2016–2018	Kasam Tere Pyaar Ki	
2016	Krishnadasi	
2024	Krishna Mohini	
2019	Kesari Nandan	
2017–2018	Laado - Veerpur Ki Mardani	
2009–2012	Laagi Tujhse Lagan	
2009–2010	Maat Pitaah Ke Charnon Mein Swarg	
2012–2014	Madhubala – Ek Ishq Ek Junoon	
2024–2026	Mangal Lakshmi	
2025	Manpasand Ki Shaadi	
2010–2011	Matti Ki Banno	
2024	Mera Balam Thanedaar	
2009	Mere Ghar Aayi Ek Nanhi Pari	
2014–2016	Meri Aashiqui Tum Se Hi	
2025	Meri Bhavya Life	
2024–2025	Megha Barsenge	
2024	Mishri	
2008–2009	Mohe Rang De	
2020–2022	Molkki	
2023	Molkki - Rishton Ki Agnipariksha	
2011	Mukti Bandhan	
2022	Muskuraane Ki Vajah Tum Ho	
2009–2012	Na Aana Is Des Laado	
2012–2013	Na Bole Tum Na Maine Kuch Kaha	
2020	Naati Pinky Ki Lambi Love Story	
2020–2021	Namak Issk Ka	
2023–2024	Neerja – Ek Nayi Pehchaan	
2021–2022	Nima Denzongpa	
2011–2013	Parichay – Nayee Zindagi Kay Sapno Ka	
2022–2025	Parineetii	
2020	Pavitra Bhagya	
2011–2012	Phulwa	
2020–2021	Pinjara Khubsurti Ka	
2022–2023	Pyar Ke Saat Vachan Dharampatnii	
2024	Qayaamat Se Qayaamat Tak	
2008–2009	Rahe Tera Aashirwaad	
2025	Ram Bhavan	
2013–2014	Rangrasiya	
2010–2011	Rishton Se Badi Pratha	
2018–2019	Roop - Mard Ka Naya Swaroop	
2022–2023	Saavi Ki Savaari	
2013–2014	Sanskaar - Dharohar Apnon Ki	
2011–2018	Sasural Simar Ka	
2021–2023	Sasural Simar Ka 2	
2017–2018	Savitri Devi College & Hospital	
2025–2026	Seher – Hone Ko Hai	
2016–2021	Shakti - Astitva Ke Ehsaas Ki	
2014–2015	Shastri Sisters	
2022–2023	Sherdil Shergill	
2019–2020	Shubharambh	
2018–2019	Silsila Badalte Rishton Ka	
2021–2022	Sirf Tum	
2022	Spy Bahu	
2023–2024	Suhaagan	
2024–2025	Suman Indori	
2015–2016	Swaragini – Jodein Rishton Ke Sur	
2022	Swaran Ghar	
2015–2017	Thapki Pyar Ki	
2021–2022	Thapki Pyar Ki 2	
2010	Thoda Hai Bas Thode Ki Zaroorat Hai	
2021–2022	Thoda Sa Baadal Thoda Sa Paani	
2017–2018	Tu Aashiqui	
2014–2019	Udaan	
2021–2024	Udaariyaan	
2008–2015	Uttaran	
2019–2020	Vidya	
2009–2010	Yeh Pyar Na Hoga Kam	

=== Historical ===
Year	Show	Ref.
2015–2016	Chakravartin Ashoka Samrat	
2017–2018	Chandrakanta	
2018–2019	Dastaan-E-Mohabbat Salim Anarkali	
2019	Jhansi Ki Rani	
2024	Pracchand Ashok	
2011–2012	Veer Shivaji	

=== Mythological series ===
Year	Show	Ref.
2008–2009	Jai Shri Krishna	
2012–2013	Jai Jag Janani Maa Durga	
2016–2018	Karmaphal Daata Shani	
2024	Lakshmi Narayan – Sukh Samarthya Santulan	
2017–2018	Mahakali — Anth Hi Aarambh Hai	
2018	Om Namah Shivay	
2019–2020	Ram Siya Ke Luv Kush	
2023–2025	Shiv Shakti – Tap Tyaag Tandav	
2009	Shri Swaminarayan Bhagwaan	
2019–2020	Shrimad Bhagwat Mahapuran	
2009	Vikram Betaal	

=== Comedy ===
Year	Show	Ref.
2018	Belan Wali Bahu	
2017	Bhaag Bakool Bhaag	
2011	Hamari Saas Leela	
2013	Mrs. Pammi Pyarelal	
2012–2013	Nautanki: The Comedy Theatre	
2012–2013	The Late Night Show - Jitna Rangeen Utna Sangeen	
2025	Zyada Mat Udd	

=== Horror, fantasy and supernatural ===
Year	Show	Ref.
2011	Anhoniyon Ka Andhera	
2023	Bekaboo	
2015	Code Red	
2018	Kaun Hai?	
2016	Kavach... Kaali Shaktiyon Se	
2019	Kavach... Maha Shivratri	
2015–2026	Naagin	
2025–2026	Noyontara	
2022–2023	Pishachini	
2024	Suhagan Chudail	
2018–2019	Tantra	
2023	Tere Ishq Mein Ghayal	
2019	Vish	
2018–2019	Vish Ya Amrit: Sitara	

=== Reality and non-scripted ===
Year	Show	Ref.
2017	Aunty Boli Lagao Boli	
2026	Bhojpuri Bawaal	
2016	Bournvita Quiz Contest	
2016	Box Cricket League Season 2	
2011–2015	Celebrity Cricket League	
2008–2016	Chhote Miyan	
2015–2017	Comedy Nights Bachao	
2016	Comedy Nights Live	
2013–2016	Comedy Nights with Kapil	
2018–2024	Dance Deewane	
2022	Dance Deewane Juniors	
2008–2009	Dancing Queen	
2008	Ek Khiladi Ek Haseena	
2017–2018	Entertainment Ki Raat	
2015	Farah Ki Dawat	
2008–2026	Fear Factor: Khatron Ke Khiladi	
2011–2017	Golden Petal Awards	
2011	Guinness World Records – Ab India Todega	
2007	Har Ghar Kuch Kehta Hai	
2020	Hum Tum Aur Quarantine	
2022	Hunarbaaz: Desh Ki Shaan	
2017	India Banega Manch	
2009–2019	India's Got Talent	
2018	Jio Dhan Dhana Dhan	
2006–2022	Jhalak Dikhhla Jaa	
2019–2022	Khatra Khatra Khatra	
2019	Kitchen Champion	
2024–2026	Laughter Chefs – Unlimited Entertainment	
2009–2012	Mallika-E-Kitchen	
2014–2016	Mission Sapne	
2020	Mujhse Shaadi Karoge	
2010	National Bingo Night	
2025	Pati Patni Aur Panga – Jodiyon Ka Reality Check	
2017	Rasoi Ki Jung Mummyon Ke Sung	
2017–2019	Rising Star	
2008	Sajid's Superstars	
2012	Sur Kshetra	
2026	The 50	
2014–2015	The Anupam Kher Show - Kucch Bhi Ho Sakta Hai	
2021–2022	The Big Picture	
2012–2013	Zindagi Ki Haqeeqat Se Aamna Saamna	

=== Animated ===
Year	Show	Ref.
2017–2019	Baahubali: The Lost Legends	
2016	Chhoti Anandi	
2013	Pakdam Pakdai	
2012–2013	Suraj: The Rising Star	

=== Pro wrestling/MMA ===
Year	Show	Ref.
2009	100% De Dana Dan	
2012	Ring Ka King - Wrestling Ka Mahayudh	
2012	Super Fight League	

== Aapka Colors ==
Aapka Colors is the American and Canadian version of Colors TV which includes English subtitles for every show. Some shows are available exclusively on this channel.

- Ancient Healing by Dr. Pankaj Naram

== See also ==
- List of programs broadcast by Colors Rishtey
