= Namak Issk Ka =

Indian television series (2020-2021)

- Genre: Romance; Social Drama Supernatural
- Created by: Gul Khan
- Written by: Divy Nidhi Sharma; Aparajita Sharma
- Screenplay by: Sudhir Kumar Singh
- Story by: Sudhir Kumar Singh
- Directed by: Atif Khan
- Creative director: Muskan Bajaj
- Starring: Shruti Sharma Aditya Ojha Aamir Khan Antara Biswas
- Theme music composer: Tapas Relia
- Opening theme: O Sajanwa
- Composer: Nishant–Raja
- Country of origin: India
- Original language: Hindi
- No. of seasons: 1
- No. of episodes: 187

Production
- Producers: Gul Khan; Deepti Kalwani
- Cinematography: Nidhin Valanday
- Editors: Shashank Harendra Singh; Rakesh Lal Das
- Camera setup: Multi-camera
- Running time: 22–25 minutes
- Production company: 4 Lions Films

Original release
- Network: Colors TV
- Release: 7 December 2020 – 20 August 2021

Namak Issk Ka (transl. Salt of love) is an Indian drama television series that premiered on Colors TV on 7 December 2020. Produced by Gul Khan and Deepti Kalwani under 4 Lions Films, it starred Shruti Sharma, Aditya Ojha and Antara Biswas in lead roles. Principal photography ended on 13 August 2021. The show telecast its last episode on 20 August 2021 and was replaced by Nima Denzongpa.

== Plot ==
The story is about an item girl named Kahani Verma, also known as Chamcham Rani, and a rich businessman, Yug Pratap Rajput, who are childhood friends who became separated in an accident. Yug and Kahani meet after 15 years. This is when Yug learns that Kahani is a dancer.

Kahani is shown to have adopted two orphans and works hard to support them. Yug hates Kahani as he considers all dancers to be home-breakers who just want to lure rich people for money. Though other members of the family do not believe Kahani to be such, Yug insults her and throws her out of the house when he learns that it was her all along who was the nurse to Ravikant, Yug's father's friend and Kahani's biological father. It is revealed that Iravati, Ravikant's second wife caused the accident 15 years ago which left Ravikant paralyzed and Meera dead, which separated Kahani from her family.

Yug's opinion towards Kahani changes when she saves Rupa, Yug's sister-in-law and Kahani's step-sister from a bullet, intended to kill her so as to blackmail Iravati. Yug's brother Raunak lusts after Kahani while pulling on a facade of a loving husband to a scared Rupa, even though he has a son named Harsh. He somehow convinces her to marry him while keeping her in dark that he is Yug's brother and Rupa's husband, he tells her that his first wife died, but Kahani learns the truth about Raunak. Raunak kidnaps Kahani's brother Lucky and forces her to marry him. Yug tries to prevent Kahani and Raunak from marrying. Rupa learns the truth and tries to commit suicide but is saved by Yug. For Raunak's happiness, Rupa plans to do the wedding of Raunak and Kahani secretly along with Yug and Gunjan's marriage. But Yug discovers that Kahani is disguised as Rupa. Soon he reveals this to everybody. After a shocking turn of events, Kahani becomes the epicentre of the family's condemnation and rejection when the series of events force Yug to marry her. However, she stands up against the family for insulting her and declares to leave the house for good. Despite her efforts, Kahani fails to escape Yug's clutches. Soon, she attacks Yug and rushes to meet Rani and Lucky. However, Kahani notices the lock Yug gave her in their childhood and realises that he is her long-lost friend. Iravati tries to console Gunjan after her wedding to Yug is jeopardised. But Gunjan lashes out at her and reveals knowing about her attempt to murder Ravikant. However, a cunning Iravati changes tact and convinces Gunjan to change her opinion. As Kahani is being treated unfairly by the whole family, she hopes to tell Yug the truth and seek his trust. However, Yug tells Kahani that he has nothing but deep-rooted hatred for her.

== Cast ==
=== Main ===
- Shruti Sharma as
  - Kahani Verma Rajput / Chamcham: Meera and Ravikant's elder daughter; Iravati's stepdaughter; Satya's twin sister; Rupa and Gunjan's half-sister; Lucky and Rani's foster sister; Yug's best friend and wife (2020–2021)
  - Satya Verma: Meera and Ravikant's younger daughter; Iravati's stepdaughter; Kahani's twin sister; Rupa and Gunjan's half-sister (2021)
- Aditya Ojha as Yug Rajput: Saroj and Nishikant's younger son; Raunak and Juhi's brother; Kahani's best friend and husband (2020–2021)
- Antara Biswas as Iravati Verma: Former bar dancer; Ravikant's second wife; Rupa and Gunjan's mother; Kahani and Satya's stepmother; Harsh's step-grandmother (2020–2021) (Dead)

=== Recurring ===
- Rajshri Rani as Rupa Verma Rajput: Ravikant and Iravati's elder daughter; Gunjan's sister; Kahani and Satya's half-sister; Raunak's widow; Harsh's stepmother; Iravati and Raunak's murderer (2020–2021)
- Aamir Khan as Raunak "Ronny" Rajput: Saroj and Nishikant's elder son; Yug and Juhi's brother; Rupa's husband; Harsh’s father (2020–2021) (Dead)
- Garima Vikrant Singh as Saroj Rajput: Nishikant's widow; Raunak, Yug and Juhi's mother; Harsh's grandmother (2020–2021)
- Ayansh Mishra as Harsh Rajput: Raunak and Pallavi's son; Rupa's stepson (2020–2021)
- Drishti Thakur as Juhi Rajput: Saroj and Nishikant's daughter; Raunak and Yug's sister (2020–2021)
- Meena Nathani as Amba Rajput: Nishikant's mother; Raunak, Yug and Juhi's grandmother; Harsh's great-grandmother (2020–2021)
- Anjali Gupta as Meera Verma: Ravikant's first wife; Kahani and Satya's mother (2020) (Dead)
- Muzaffar Khan as Ravikant Verma: Nishikant's best friend; Meera's widower; Iravati's husband; Rupa, Kahani, Gunjan and Satya's father; Harsh's step-grandfather (2020–2021)
- Sheetal Tiwari as Gunjan Verma: Ravikant and Iravati's younger daughter; Rupa's sister; Kahani and Satya's half-sister; Yug's former obsessive one-sided lover (2020–2021)
- Zoya Humayuh as Rani: Kahani and Lucky's foster sister (2020–2021)
- Unknown as Pallavi Singh Rathod: A bar dancer; Raunak's mistress; Harsh's mother (2020–2021)
- Arjun Aneja as Karan: Gunjan's groom (2021)
- Golo Morea as Dolly: House helper at Rajputs'; Patanga's wife (2020–2021)
- Nikhil Mehta as Patanga: House helper at Rajputs'; Dolly's husband (2020–2021)
- Jaswant Menaria as Shailendra Thakur: Kahani's stalker (2020) (Dead)

=== Special appearances ===
- Sidharth Shukla as himself (2021)
- Rakhi Sawant as herself (2021)
- Lalit Singh as Friend: Holi Sequence (2021)
- Rubina Dilaik as Soumya Singh from Shakti – Astitva Ke Ehsaas Ki (2021)
- Dipika Kakar as Simar Bharadwaj to promote Sasural Simar Ka 2 (2021)
- Pravisht Mishra as Aniruddh Roy Chaudhary from Barrister Babu (2021)
- Aurra Bhatnagar Badoni as Bondita Roy Chaudhary from Barrister Babu (2021)
- Ankit Gupta as Fateh Singh Virk from Udaariyaan (2021)
- Isha Malviya as Jasmine Sandhu from Udaariyaan (2021)
- Priyal Mahajan as Purvi Veerendra Pratapsingh from Molkki (2021)
- Amar Upadhyay as Veerendra Pratapsingh from Molkki (2021)
- Priyanka Chahar Choudhary as Tejo Sandhu from Udaariyaan (2021)
- Avinesh Rekhi as Sarabjeet Singh Gill from Choti Sarrdaarni (2021)
- Aekam Binjwa as Paramjeet Singh Gill from Choti Sarrdaarni (2021)
- Kevina Tak as Seher Kaur Gill from Choti Sarrdaarni (2021)
- Sahil Uppal as Omkar Shukla from Pinjra Khoobsurti Ka (2021)
- Riya Sharma as Dr. Mayura Shukla from Pinjra Khoobsurti Ka (2021)
- Aditya Redij as Shiva Lashkare from Bawara Dil (2021)
- Kinjal Dhamecha as Siddhi Lashkare from Bawara Dil (2021)
