= Attihannu Mattu Kanaja =

Attihannu mattu Kanaja (English: Fig Fruit and The Wasps) is a 2014 Kannada feature film written and directed by M S Prakash Babu, co-produced by National Film Development Corporation (NFDC) and Produced by Bhavani Prakash under the banner of Bayalu Chitra Productions, features actors Bhavani Prakash, Ranjit Bhaskaran, Manjunath Belakere, Ravi Phoenix and in the lead roles. The film was selected for the 5th Beijing International Film Festival, and nominated for ‘Tiantan Award’ 2015.

== Cast ==
- Bhavani Prakash as Gowri
- Ranjit Bhaskaran as Vittal
- Manjunath Belakere as Basanna
- Achyuth Kumar as Gowri's husband
- Ravi Phoenix as Sadashiva (Poet)
- Bhoomika as Basanna's Daughter
- Shruti as Basanna's wife

== Plot ==
Gouri, a documentary filmmaker takes a journey along with her friend. She is trying to collect material for her documentary project on instrumental music. They go to a village with the help of a schoolteacher. They travel to meet an instrumental musician, who has gone some place elsewhere to give a performance. Both are forced to stay in the village till the musician returns. Film tries to capture the human attitude when they are placed in a condition/situation/environment which is familiar and at the same time unfamiliar. As the seemingly simple yet complex situations develop, how these characters fits into a landscape and climate as much mental as physical. Some time “vision” isn’t what is visible, sound isn’t exactly what is heard.

== International Film Festivals attended ==
- 16th Mumbai Film Festival 2014
- 7th Bengaluru International Film Festival 2014
- Calgary International Film Festival, CANADA. 2015

== Awards ==
Awarded NETPAC Jury special mention, 7th Bengaluru International Film Festival 2014, Asian Competition section.

== See also ==
- Live Mint: Of time and other demons by Nandini Ramnath
- Hindustan Times: Fig Fruit and the Wasps: At Beijing Film Fest, an Indian work with a difference by Gautaman Bhaskaran
- The Hindu: Attihannu mattu kanaja in Mumbai Film Festival by Muralidhara Khajane
- Gilf Times: Fig Fruit and the Wasps is pure cinema by Gautaman Bhaskaran
- Art Scene India: Film Review: Fig Fruit and the Wasps
- Hindustan Times: Attihannu Mattu Kanaja lone entry from India at Beijing film fest by Sutirtho Patranobis
