= Junooniyatt =

Indian musical drama television series (2023)

- Genre: Musical drama Romance
- Created by: Sargun Mehta; Ravi Dubey
- Screenplay by: Rajesh Chawla
- Story by: Faizal Akhtar; Pallavi Mehta
- Starring: See below
- Theme music composer: Salim-Sulaiman; Singers; Salim Merchant; Shraddha Pandit; Vivek Hariharan; Lyrics; Shraddha Pandit; Music Producers; Raj Pandit; Muheet Bharti
- Opening theme: Junooniyatt
- Composer: Preetam Maer
- Country of origin: India
- Original language: Hindi
- No. of seasons: 1
- No. of episodes: 190

Production
- Producers: Ravi Dubey; Sargun Mehta
- Cinematography: Indranil Singha
- Camera setup: Multi-camera
- Running time: 20-45 minutes
- Production company: Dreamiyata Entertainment Pvt. Ltd.

Original release
- Network: Colors TV
- Release: 13 February – 3 November 2023

Junooniyatt (transl. Passion/Obsession) is an Indian Hindi language musical romantic drama television series. that aired on Colors TV from 13 February 2023 to 3 November 2023. Produced by Sargun Mehta and Ravi Dubey under the banner of Dreamiyata Entertainment, it starred Ankit Gupta, Gautam Singh Vig and Neha Rana.

== Plot ==
Ilahi, Jahaan, and Jordan are three aspiring musicians that want to take part in The Great Indian Voice competition to show off their talents.

Ilahi was abandoned by her mother Diljot as a child and was raised by her father. Her singing is an ode to her mother, who used to sing as a duo with her husband Amar. Her grandmother (Biji) is against her singing and will do anything to stop Ilahi from singing. However, it was known that Ilahi's mother was forced to abandon her as Biji left no stones unturned to destroy Diljot's singing passion and career with her evil tricks. Jahaan lives in Canada with his parents. However, his parents were forced out of India after being accused of a fraud in their own family business. Jahaan wants to become a huge singer to give back honour to his parents' name. Jordan, on the other hand, comes from a rich family. He is a self-obsessed, spoilt brat. He wants to become a superstar through his rapping skills. His mother, Maheeb, pulls strings to get whatever she wants and makes sure Jordan also gets what he wants.

Jahaan and Ilahi end up falling in love. Jordan has one-sided obsession with Ilahi and wants her no matter what. On Jahaan's wedding day, Maheeb falsely accuses Jahaan of ruining Jordan's life. She also brings up the past as to how Jahaan's parents were thieves and ruined their own family's name. Ilahi's father, Amar, breaks the marriage as he doesn't want his daughter to suffer by living with a liar. On the other hand, Maheeb also planned Baljeet and Dolly's accident so Jahaan has to leave for Canada.

Ilahi is heartbroken, thinking that Jahaan did betray her and left for Canada without saying anything. In reality, Jahaan had called her but Ilahi's grandmother disconnected the call. Under her father's pressure, Ilahi ends up marrying Jordan. Ilahi and Jordan become partners for the competition and end up winning the competition.

In Canada, Jahaan is heartbroken as his mother is in coma and he lost his true love. Seerat, Ilahi's estranged sister, cheers him up and tries to reignite his passion. She helps him recover and gets him to sing again, but she ends up falling in love in the process while spending time with him. Jahaan makes up his mind to seek revenge from Maheeb for what she did to him and his parents. Jahaan goes back to India with Seerat and his parents.

In India, Ilahi is kept in the dark about all the music record proposals she is receiving. Maheeb manipulates Jordan into thinking that Ilahi will leave him in the dust if she becomes famous. Jordan starts mistreating Ilahi and even leaves her to die. Jahaan ends up saving her and takes her to the hospital. Ilahi's father makes Jahaan promise that he will never come in front of Ilahi.

After Ilahi gains consciousness, she is scared of Jordan. She doesn't wanna go back with him, but Amar forces her to go back as he thinks it's a minor misunderstanding. Jordan pretends to have changed his way in front of Ilahi. On the other hand, Jahaan becomes a sensational superstar under the masked identity of Sultan. Ilahi decides to take a chance and make her dreams a reality and goes to audition for Sultan. Jordan, who is also unaware of Sultaan's identity, sends in his audition clip. Jahaan rejects him and Jordan can't accept the rejection. When he realises Ilahi is going to the audition as well, he slaps Ilahi in front of everyone. Finally, Amar sees Jordan's true face as he was there to witness the slap. He apologizes to Ilahi for not trusting her.

Ilahi ends up exposing Jordan's behavior to the Mehta family and asks Jordan for a divorce, but Jordan refuses to give Ilahi a divorce. Jordan and Maheeb use Dosanjh family's property papers to blackmail Ilahi into coming back. Amidst all this, Ilahi learns why Jahaan had left for Canada. Jahaan tells her to not worry about his problems and focus on hers as she has a battle to fight. Jahaan is also working on his plan to expose Maheeb's reality to the world. Eventually he makes Maheeb confess her cunning plan along with Inder, who was brainwashed by Maheeb. They confess that they framed Baljeet and Dolly to get them out of the family fortune. Inder apologizes to Baljeet and Dolly, as well as Bebe and Bauji as well. Maheeb reluctantly apologizes as well. Finally, the entire Mehta family reunites much to the dismay of Maheeb and Jordan.

Later on, due to Ilahi's touch, Dolly emerges from the coma but mistakenly believes that Ilahi is her daughter-in-law. Jahaan's truth about why he left to Canada is finally exposed to Amar. Jordan becomes angry and bursts out, causing Dolly to faint. The doctor warns that Dolly's condition is delicate and any stress could be fatal. Jahaan requests Ilahi to pretend to be his wife until Dolly gets well. Ilahi agrees and enters Mehta House as Jahaan's wife, hiding all the truth.

Later, Jordan discovers that Jahaan is Sultan and tells him that if Jahaan wants Dolly to get well and not let Jordan tell anything to her, Jahaan has to give Sultan's identity to Jordan. In return, Jahaan tells Jordan to stop torturing Ilahi and sign the divorce papers. Jahaan and Jordan agree to each other's deal.

Later, Jahaan confesses his love to Ilahi on the day of their fake marriage. Jordan cancels the deal he made with Jahaan, because he believed that Jahaan and Ilahi are coming closer again. On Jordan's birthday, Jordan reveals to Dolly that Ilahi is Jordan's wife, not Jahaan's. Dolly insults Ilahi, causing her to leave the Mehta House. On the same day, by Jordan's plan, Ilahi discovers Jahaan's true identity of Sultan during his performance in a fair. She becomes really proud of Jahaan for completing his dream. However, a terrorists attack occurs there, leading to the abduction of everyone present, including Ilahi and Jordan but not Jahaan. In an effort to save Ilahi and everyone, Jahaan puts his life on the line and is shot.

Jahaan loses much blood and he needed "O-negative" blood in emergency or else he won't survive. Even after much searching Ilahi and other family members weren't able to find the blood. However, Jahaan's blood group matched with Jordan, for which Ilahi requests him to give him his blood. Taking advantage of the situation, Jordan strikes a deal with Ilahi that he wants a second chance with their marriage. Ilahi agrees, but states her condition too: he won't bother anyone in his family, especially Jahaan and if he wouldn't be able to make their relation successful within a month, he'll have to sign the divorce papers. Jordan agrees and gives his blood to Jahaan and both agree to consummate their marriage much to Jahaan's disbelief. Eventually, Jahaan learns the truth about the deal, but Ilahi requests Jahaan to stay out of their personal matters. Unable to see Jahaan's situation, Dolly gives an ultimatum to Jahaan that he must move on with his life and marry Seerat. Jahaan initially denies but Dolly puts forth a condition that if he doesn't stop thinking about Ilahi then he'll have to forget his parents. Dolly gives Jahaan one week time to think about his decision. Meanwhile, Jordan's true colours are out and he vows to exact revenge on both Ilahi and Jahaan.

Later on, Jordan finally divorces Ilahi. Jahaan agrees to marry Seerat for the sake of Ilahi while Ilahi decides to leave for Chandigarh. Seerat turns antagonistic and starts attacking Ilahi so that Jahaan could finally be hers. However, one day before Jahaan and Seerat's haldi ceremony, Jahaan secretly marries Ilahi in the temple without Ilahi's permission. Next day, as Ilahi was leaving Chandigarh, Seerat takes Ilahi to a cliff, where she revealed that she was doing all the attacks on Ilahi. Ilahi is shocked while Seerat pushes Ilahi down the cliff and Ilahi falls into the river. At the same time, Jahaan reveals his and Ilahi's secret marriage to the family.

Fortunately, Ilahi was saved but she remains comatose for ten days. After waking up from her coma, she stops Jahaan and Seerat's marriage. She also exposes Seerat and Jordan's reality to the family. Seerat and Jordan are arrested by the police for attempt of murder. Jahaan and Ilahi get married.

=== Some years later ===
Ilahi has given birth to a baby boy, Ilhaan. Ilahi is called a random number and that person is revealed to be Jordan. Junooniyatt ends with the tag "To be continued...".

== Cast ==
=== Main ===
- Ankit Gupta as Jahaan Mehta: Dolly and Baljeet's son; Varun, Jordan and Tina's cousin; Seerat's ex-fiancé; Ilahi's husband; Ilhaan's father (2023)
  - Sultan: Jahaan's masked identity (2023)
- Neha Rana as Ilahi Jahaan Mehta (née Dosanjh): Diljot and Amar's elder daughter; Seerat's sister; Lucky's cousin; Jordan's ex-wife; Jahaan's wife; Ilhaan's mother (2023)
- Gautam Singh Vig as Jordan "Jordy" Mehta: Maheep and Inder's second son; Varun and Tina's brother; Jahaan's cousin; Ilahi's ex-husband and obsessive one-sided lover; Ilhan's uncle (2023)

=== Recurring ===
- Manasi Salvi / Rinku Ghosh as Maheep Mehta: Inder's wife; Varun, Jordan and Tina's mother; college trustee (2023)
- Ram Aujla / Raaj Sunger / Rishi Khurana as Inderjeet "Inder" Singh Mehta: Rajpratap and Prakash's elder son; Baljeet's brother; Maheep's husband; Varun, Jordan and Tina's father; Jahaan's uncle (2023)
- Vishal Sharma as Baljeet Singh Mehta: Rajpratap and Prakash's younger son; Inder's brother; Dolly's husband; Jahaan's father; Varun, Jordan and Tina's uncle; Ilhaan's paternal grandfather (2023)
- Gurvinder Kaur as Dolly Mehta: Baljeet's wife; Jahaan's mother; Varun, Jordan and Tina's aunt; Ilhaan's paternal grandmother (2023)
- Paras Randhawa as Varun Mehta: Inder and Maheep's eldest son; Jordan and Tina's elder brother; Jahaan's cousin; Rasika's husband (2023)
- Mansi Sharma as Rasika Mehta: Varun's wife (2023)
- Aarchi Sachdeva as Tina Mehta: Inder and Maheep's daughter; Varun and Jordan's younger sister; Jahaan's cousin (2023)
- Balwinder Kaur as Prakash "Bebe / Biji" Kaur Mehta: Rajpratap's wife; Inder and Baljeet's mother; Jordan, Tina, Varun and Jahaan's grandmother; Ilhaan's paternal great-grandmother (2023)
- Manoj Bhatia as Rajpratap "Bauji" Singh Mehta: Prakash's husband; Inder and Baljeet's father; Jordan, Tina, Varun and Jahaan's grandfather; Ilhaan's paternal great-grandfather (2023)
- Abhishek Sharma as Sunny: Jordan's friend (2023)
- Vishwas Saraf as Karan: Jordan's friend (2023)
- Palak Jain as Seerat Dosanjh: Amar and Diljot's younger daughter; Ilahi's (formerly estranged) younger sister; Jahaan's ex-fiancée and obsessive one-sided lover; Sultan's manager (2023)
- Mamta Rana as Diljot "DJ" Dosanjh: Amar's (formerly estranged) wife; Ilahi and Seerat's mother; Ilhaan's maternal grandmother (2023)
- Aman Sutdhar as Amardeep "Amar" Dosanjh: Charan's son; Diljot's (formerly estranged) husband; Ilahi and Seerat's father; Ilhaan's maternal grandfather (2023)
- Sushma Prashant as Charan "Biji" Kaur Dosanjh: Amar and Kimmi's mother; Ilahi, Seerat and Lucky's grandmother; Ilhaan's maternal great-grandmother (2023)
- Poonam Walia as Kimmi Kaur: Charan's daughter; Happy's wife; Lucky's mother (2023)
- Pali Geetan Wala as Happy: Kimmi's husband; Lucky's father (2023)
- Shriaansh Sharma as Lucky: Happy and Kimmi's son; Ilahi's cousin (2023)
- Priya Bharadwaj as Husna: Ilahi's best friend (2023)
- Kawalpreet Singh as Dharmendra: Ilahi's friend; Jahaan's former landlord and elder-brother figure (2023)
- Onika Maan as Monica: Jordan's friend (2023)
- Tanya Mahajan as Shikha Mann: Ranjeet's legal wife (2023)
- Abhianshu Vohra as Ranjeet Mann: Ilahi's former obsessive lover; Shikha's legal husband (2023)
- Aishwarya Sakhuja-Nag as Dr. Pari Ahuja: Jahaan's voice therapist (2023)

=== Guest appearances ===
- Twinkle Arora as Nehmat Kaur Virk from Udaariyaan (2023)
- Hitesh Bharadwaj as ASP Ekampreet Randhawa aka Ekam from Udaariyaan (2023)
- Isha Malviya as Jasmine Sandhu / Harleen Ahluwalia from Udaariyaan (2023)
- Sachet Tandon & Parampara Tandon as themselves; judges of The Great Indian Voice Competition 1st Round (2023)

== Production ==
=== Casting ===
Ankit Gupta as Jahaan, Neha Rana as Ilahi, Gautam Singh Vig as Jordan were signed as the leads. In early May 2023, Aishwarya Sakhuja entered the show as Dr. Pari. Her role lasted very briefly and ended mid-May 2023. During later half of June 2023, Palak Jain was cast to play Seerat's role who is Ilahi's younger sister.

=== Development ===
The series was announced by Dreamiyata Entertainment Pvt. Ltd. for Colors TV in January 2023.

=== Filming ===
In January 2023, principal photography commenced in Chandigarh, the series is set in Punjab.

== Crossover ==
- Junooniyatt had crossover episodes with Udaariyaan on 22 and 23 March 2023.

== Reception ==
India Today noted, "The true essence of Punjab, including the dialect and aesthetics, has been kept completely intact. Viewers will find the characters relatable as they are following their dreams while love is around the corner."

== See also ==
- List of programmes broadcast by Colors TV
