= M S Prakash Babu =

Indian filmmaker

M S Prakash Babu (born 3 November 1968) is an Indian film director, screenwriter and visual artist, known for his work in Kannada feature film Attihannu mattu Kanaja (Fig Fruit and The Wasps) which was officially selected for the ‘Tiantan Award’ 2015, 5th Beijing International Film Festival. He trained as a visual artist at Viswa Bharati University, Santiniketan, West-Bengal, and worked as an illustrator and graphic designer for The Times of India.

== Early life and education ==
M S Prakash Babu was born and brought up at Chitradurga and studied at Public Primary School (PPS) Chitradurga, Karnataka. After finishing his schooling, he joined the Government School of art at Davangere to study visual Art, then went to work in Kanoria Centre for Arts studios with a fellowship for a year, Ahmedabad. He completed Post-graduation in Painting from Kala Bhavan, Viswa Bharati University, Santiniketan in 1993.

== Career ==
From 1997 to 2009 he had painting shows in India and abroad. In 2001 directed his first short film "Afternoon Song". He had been awarded a Fellowship in the field of Visual Art ( Film/ Video) at Helsinki (Finland) under the UNESCO-ASCHBERG 2001-2002. Between 2001 and 2013 he written and directed five short films. His short films screened in major international film festivals like Tehran International film festival, Mumbai International film festival, Jordan International film festival, International film festival of Kerala. 35th Clermont-Ferrand Short Film Festival 2013, France.

In 2013, his first independent feature film "Attihannu mattu Kanaja" (Fig Fruit and The Wasps) was selected by NFDC for Film Bazaar's Work-In-Progress Lab in 2013. Fig Fruit and The Wasps his directorial debut, has excelled and been honoured at several prestigious international film festivals since its completion, including the 5th Beijing International Film Festival, 16th Mumbai Film Festival (MAMI), 7th Bengaluru International Film Festival, Calgary International Film Festival 2015 and 14th Dhaka International Film Festival 2016.

== Filmography ==
- Madhyaanada Haadu (Afternoon Song) 2001 (Short)
- Three Months of Solitude 2002 (Short)
- Mungaara Mugilu (Monsoon Cloud) 2005 (Short)
- Poorva Dikkina Gaali (The East Wind) 2008 (Short)
- Manna Payana (Journey of Earth) 2013 (Short)
- Attihannu mattu Kanaja (Fig Fruit and The Wasps) 2014 (Feature)
