= Hitesh Bharadwaj =

Indian television actor

- Born: 23 December 1991 (age 34); Mathura, Uttar Pradesh, India
- Occupations: Anchor; RJ; Actor; Model; Poet
- Years active: 2012–present
- Known for: Choti Sarrdaarni; Udaariyaan; Ghum Hai Kisikey Pyaar Meiin
- Spouse: Suditi Srivastava (m. 2019)

Hitesh Bharadwaj (born 23 December 1991) is an Indian television actor, model, anchor, RJ and poet who is best known for playing Manav Sharma / Vikram Diwan in Choti Sarrdaarni, Ekampreet "Ekam" Singh Randhawa in Udaariyaan and Rajat Thakkar in Ghum Hai Kisikey Pyaar Meiin.

== Life and family ==
Hitesh Bharadwaj was born on 23 December 1991 in Mathura, Uttar Pradesh to Rakesh Bharadwaj and Kusumlata Sharma Bharadwaj. He also has a younger brother, Rahul Bharadwaj. Bharadwaj completed his schooling from Army School, Mathura and graduated from St. John's College, Agra. He married his girlfriend, Suditi Srivastava in 2019.

== Career ==
Bharadwaj first started his career as a News presenter in a local news channel on a monthly income of 2000 rupees. Then, prior to his career as an actor, he also worked as a RJ at BIG FM 92.7. Bharadwaj made his acting debut in 2012, with Suvreen Guggal – Topper of The Year. He rose to fame, in 2016, by playing the lead, Ravi in Hindi television series Agar Tum Saath Ho. Bharadwaj made his film debut, in 2018, with Jaane Kyon De Yaaron.

Bharadwaj's most prominent roles were playing one of the leads, Manav Sharma / Vikram Diwan in Colors TV series Choti Sarrdaarni opposite Nimrit Kaur Ahluwalia and Sanjay Pathak in Iss Mod Se Jaate Hain. Since September 2022, he portrayed Ekampreet Singh Randhawa in Colors TV's popular drama Udaariyaan opposite Twinkle Arora.

From 2024 to 2025, he playing the lead role of Rajat Thakkar in Star Plus's popular drama Ghum Hai Kisikey Pyaar Mein opposite Bhavika Sharma.

Bharadwaj is also working as a RJ at 104.8 Ishq FM.

== Filmography ==
=== Films ===
Year	Title	Role	Notes
2018	Jaane Kyon De Yaaron	Asst. Advocate	Cameo Appearance

=== Television ===
Year	Serial	Role	Notes	Ref.
2012–2013	Suvreen Guggal – Topper of The Year	Zorro	Supporting Role	
2014	Love by Chance	Adarsh Sharma	Episodic Role	
2014–2015	Million Dollar Girl	Vicky (Banarasi Sherlock)	Supporting Role	
2016–2017	Agar Tum Saath Ho	Ravi	Lead Role	
2019; 2020–2021	Choti Sarrdaarni	Manav Sharma / Fake Vikram Diwan	Supporting Role	
2021	Shaurya Aur Anokhi Ki Kahani	A.C.P. Aahir Chattwal	Supporting Role	
2021–2022	Iss Mod Se Jaate Hain	Sanjay Pathak	Lead Role	
2022–2023	Udaariyaan	A.S.P. Ekampreet "Ekam" Singh Randhawa	Lead Role	
2024	Aankh Micholi	IPS Malhar Thakkar	Supporting Role	
2024–2025	Ghum Hai Kisikey Pyaar Meiin	Rajat Thakkar	Lead Role	
2025	Aami Dakini	Ayaan Roy Choudhury	Lead Role	

=== Special appearances ===
Year	Title	Role	Notes
2019	Khatra Khatra Khatra	Manav Sharma	
2023	Junooniyatt	A.S.P. Ekampreet "Ekam" Singh Randhawa	

=== Short films ===
Year	Title	Role	Director
2018	Confessions	Aditya	Rishab Dahiya
2020	Bridge	Rahul	Smriti Singh

== See also ==
- List of Indian actors
- List of Indian television actors
