= Neha Rana =

Indian television actress (born 1999)

- Born: 23 March 1999 (age 27); Ludhiana, Punjab, India
- Years active: 2020–present
- Notable work: Junooniyatt; Megha Barsenge; Mahadev & Sons

Neha Rana (born 23 March 1999) is an Indian actress who predominantly works in Hindi television. She is best known for her roles in Junooniyatt, Megha Barsenge and Mahadev & Sons.

== Career ==
In 2021, Neha made her television debut with the show Ishk Par Zor Nahin where she played the role of Rhea Mehta. She also played the role of Anurita in Choti Sarrdaarni in the same year. In 2022, she played a supporting role in Banni Chow Home Delivery.

In 2023, Neha portrayed the role of Ilahi Dosanjh in Junooniyatt, making it her first show in the lead role. In 2026, she played the role of Narmada Saini in Mahadev & Sons.

== Filmography ==
=== Television ===
Year	Serial	Role	Notes	Ref.
2021	Ishk Par Zor Nahi	Rhea Mehta	Debut show	
2021	Choti Sarrdaarni	Anurita		
2022	Banni Chow Home Delivery	Niyati		
2023	Junooniyatt	Ilahi Dosanjh	Lead role	
2024–2025	Megha Barsenge	Megha Khurana	Lead role	
2025	Megha Barsenge	Megha "Mannu" Talwar	Lead role	
2025	Dhaakad Beera	Karishma Chaudhary	Lead role	
2026–present	Mahadev & Sons	Narmada Saini Mahadev	Lead role	

=== Special appearances ===
Year	Serial	Role
2024	Parineetii	Megha Khurana

=== Music video ===
Year	Title	Singer	Ref.
2020	Mareez-e-Ishq	Shaarib Sabri	
2020	Left Right	Sandeep Surila	
2020	Khaas		
2020	Teriyan Akhiyan	Arun Solanki	

== See also ==
- List of Hindi television actresses
- List of Indian television actresses
