= Doresani =

Indian television drama

- Genre: Drama
- Created by: Manju Chelur
- Screenplay by: Nikitha Gowri
- Starring: Roopika; Prithviraj
- Opening theme: Ne Doresani Nanna Doresani
- Composer: Sunad Gautham
- Country of origin: India
- Original language: Kannada
- No. of episodes: 205

Production
- Executive producer: Vittal Mugulur
- Producer: Prakash (film director)
- Production location: Bengaluru
- Camera setup: Multi-camera
- Running time: 6:30 PM
- Production company: Jaimatha Combines

Original release
- Network: Colors Kannada
- Release: 20 December 2021 – 21 August 2022

Doresani is an Indian television drama in the Kannada language that premiered on Colors Kannada on 20 December 2021.

== Summary ==
The story revolves around the lives of a father, daughter, and his boss. Deepika, the apple of her father Purushotham's eye, promises to never fall in love. Unaware of the ways of the heart, she is confident of her decision until she meets Vishwanath Anand, an orphan and self-made man, who runs an auditing firm. Anand is Purushotham's boss at the office whom Purushotham hates because of his strictness in the office. Then Purushotham learns that his daughter is in love with the man he hates.

== Cast ==
=== Main ===
- Prithviraj as Vishwanathan Anand – Purushottham's boss; Deepika's love interest
- Roopika as Deepika – Purushottham's first daughter; Anand's love interest
- Jaidev Mohan as Purushottham – Deepika's father

=== Recurring ===
- Bhavani Prakash as Sathyavathi – Sinchana's mother
- Madhumathi as Soudamini – Deepika's mother; Purushottham's wife
- Shewtha Koglur as Sinchana – Rajath's wife; Sathyavathi's daughter
- Bhuvana Murali as Saptami – Deepika's first younger sister; Purushottham's second daughter
- Prathima as Goutami – Deepika's second younger sister; Purushottam's third daughter
- Darshith Gowda as Rajath – Deepika's elder brother; Purushottam's son
- Amogh Adiga as Sinchana's younger brother; Satyavathi's son
- Sushma as Siri – Anand's office assistant
- Shubha as Ningamma – Anand's house maid who is treated as a family member
- Bhagat snow as Inspector Ram – Anand's best friend
- Gagan Ram as Giridhar – The manager in Anand's office

=== Cameo appearances ===
- Shamanth Gowda as Bro Gowda – Anand's office worker's brother
- Priyanka Thimmesh as Priyanka – Bro Gowda's wife
- Nikhil Kumaraswamy

== Production ==
The show marks the comeback of actress Roopika after a break from serials. The show is being shot in and around Bengaluru. Some episodes of the show were filmed in the outskirts of Bengaluru.

== Soundtrack ==
The title song for the series Doresani has been sung by singer Rajath Hegde, Neenada Nayak and Shamir Haripu. The original music is provided by Sunad Gautham.

Doresani Soundtrack:
No.	Title	Lyrics	Singer	Length
1.	"Doresani Title Song"	V. Nagendra Prasad	Rajath Hegde, Neenada Nayak, Shamir Haripu	1:18
Total length:				1:18
