= Mahadev & Sons =

Indian family drama television series

- Genre: Family drama
- Created by: Saurabh Tewari
- Based on: Pandian Stores 2 by Priya Thambi
- Developed by: Priya Thambi
- Written by: Pranjal Saxena; Amitabh Singh; Dialogue: Ishan Bajpai
- Directed by: Prashant Singh
- Creative director: Ketaki Walawalker
- Starring: Shakti Anand; Sneha Wagh; Narayani Shastri; Aasim Khan; Garvita Sadhwani
- Country of origin: India
- Original language: Hindi
- No. of seasons: 1
- No. of episodes: 249

Production
- Producer: Saurabh Tewari
- Camera setup: Multi-camera
- Running time: 20–25 minutes
- Production company: Parin Multimedia

Original release
- Network: Colors TV
- Release: 5 January 2026 – present

Mahadev & Sons is an Indian Hindi-language soap opera drama television series airing from 5 January 2026 on Colors TV and streams digitally on JioHotstar. Produced by Saurabh Tewari under Parin Multimedia, it stars Shakti Anand, Sneha Wagh and Narayani Shastri. The show is an official adaptation of Star Vijay's Tamil series Pandian Stores 2.

== Plot ==
Mahadev, an orphan, works as a servant in the house of the Bajpai family, the owners of Bajpai Brick Kiln. Their elder daughter, Bhanu is deeply attached to her younger sister, Vidya.

10 years later, he elopes with Vidya. Later, Bhanu's wedding is fixed to a man named Madhav, who angers her by talking about Vidya and Mahadev. Later, she swears that she will not marry until she sees Mahadev's funeral. Due to this, their father, Omprakash Bajpai goes in a dilemma and dies.

25 years later, Vidya and Mahadev live in a wealthy family, and have 5 children: Ashish, Kamakshi, Ketan, Dheeraj, and Priya. Bhanu prays for Mahadev's demise wih her brother Yash, while their youngest son, Dheeraj, wants his family to celebrate their 25th anniversary, and brings a poster along with his uncle, Satya. Seeing this, Mahadev is angered and throws the poster, which lands at Bhanu's house and destroys her cake. Because of this, they both fight outside their houses, and Mahadev decides to celebrate their 25th anniversary. Bhanu tells the people coming to their anniversary to eat her birthday cake first. Mahadev is heartbroken when no one comes to his celebration.

Later, Ketan secretly steals money from Mahadev's rice mill to buy a gift for his girlfriend, Narmada, which Dheeraj is blamed for. Ashish is also heartbroken after he sees his girlfriend Madhu married to someone else, so Ashish gets drunk. Mahadev is shocked to see this, and he soon asks a priest to find brides for their 3 sons. Dheeraj later ensures Ketan that he will be married to Narmada. Ashish comes home drunk once more, which makes his dad angry, and as a result of this Ashish is beaten up. Dheeraj goes to Narmada's house, and talks to her father, Ramesh Saini. He later tells Mahadev about Ketan, who is also thrashed. Mahadev later states that no one in the house will have a love marriage. So, Ketan ends his relationship with Narmada, upsetting her. Later, Narmada comes to their house, and they later plan to elope and marry. Dheeraj assures his brother's marriage.

The next day, they both go to the temple to marry each other, which Bhanu and her foster daughter Rajji see, who call Mahadev asking for help with rice bags. Mahadev and Vidya come and are shocked to see their marriage. Bhanu provokes Mahadev, while Dheeraj tells Ketan to stay strong. After they discover Dheeraj's involvement in the marriage, Mahadev expels Dheeraj from the house. He later spends the night on a bench.

Narmada later tells Rajji to help her in finding Dheeraj. Bhanu later lies to Mahadev that Vidya is secretly betraying him, who asks her to choose between him or Dheeraj. Yash and Ramesh secretly plot against Dheeraj, and send goons to stab Dheeraj.Their plan succeeds and Dheeraj is sent to the hospital.Vidya warns Mahadev that she would never forgive him if something were to happen to Dheeraj. Mahadev eventually realises his mistakes. He asks Dheeraj for forgiveness and the family reunites. Mahadev, being certain that Yash and Bhanu had some hand in Dheeraj's planned attack, files FIR against them. Bhanu proves Yash and herself innocent while proving Ramesh responsible for the entire attack leading to his arrest. This causes friction between Narmada and the family with Vidya saying she would never become a member of their house, while Dheeraj promises he would give Narmada her rightful place in the family.

Elsewhere, Rajji is in love with Kalyan, a fraudster and criminal who is playing love game with her with the evil intention of selling her to some goons. Even after warnings from Dheeraj, she keeps believing in Kalyan. One day Dheeraj overhears Kalyan promising the goons to deliver Rajji to them by the college fest. He tries to tell Rajji the truth but she misunderstands that he is intentionally trying to create friction between the two. Helpless Dheeraj tells about Rajji's love affair to his grandmother and Bhanu warning them about Kalyan's plan to sell Rajji. In a twist of events planned by Bhanu, Rajji and Dheeraj are forcefully married by Vidya which causes a chaos in the Mahadev household. Bhanu convinces Rajji to stay in the marriage to destroy Mahadev family while Dheeraj takes the blame of the marriage and protects Vidya.

However, Rajji grows a fondness towards the family after marriage and is unable to do what Bhanu asked. Bhanu gets Mahadev arrested for stealing Rajji's jewelry causing conflicts between Rajji and Dheeraj. Rajji goes to Kalyan and gets back her jewelry, saving Mahadev from going to jail.

Mahadev starts finding proposals for Ashish. He fixes his marriage with Mogra, who is a fraud. Narmada and Rajji suspect Mogra and try to expose her but fail. Eventually, Ashish and Mogra get married. Dheeraj and Rajji become friends and their relationship develops, the family starts accepting Rajji too. Post marriage, Mogra reveals her true colours to Rajji and how she wants to break the family. Rajji takes the challenge and promises she won't let the family break.

The family goes to a picnic, where Mogra spikes Rajji's drink, causing her to reveal the whole truth about Kalyan and Vidya being behind the marriage. Mahadev is furious upon learning the truth and separates from Vidya. Everybody in the family blames Rajji and calls her enemy's daughter. With the help of Narmada, Rajji is able to bring out Mogra's truth in front of Dheeraj and Ashish but they hide it from Mahadev to protect him. Dheeraj apologizes for doubting Rajji and they become friends again.

Vidya decides to open her own business with support from Rajji and Dheeraj, going against Mahadev. Dheeraj starts to fall in love with Rajji. Narmada becomes pregnant which makes Mogra jealous as her mother brainwashes her that being elder Daughter-in-law she must conceive first and give the heir to the family then only her value will be constant in her household . After this Mogra starts to plan and plot to kill Narmada's child and she creates misunderstandings between Narmada and Rajji so that Rajji will be blamed and the family will break. With the help of Yash, Mogra feeds Narmada poisoned laddoos that were sent by Yash through Rajji. Narmada miscarries and all of the blame falls on Rajji, who is asked to leave the house. Rajji starts living in the shed outside the house and Dheeraj supports her and together they try to expose Mogra. Later Narmada, Dheeraj and Rajji together expose Mogra in front of the family leading Mahadev to throw Ashish and Mogra out of the house.

== Cast ==
=== Main ===
- Shakti Anand as Mahadev aka Dev: Vidya's husband; Kamakshi, Aashish, Ketan, Dheeraj and Priya's father (2026–present)
  - Unknown as young Mahadev (2026)
- Sneha Wagh as Vidya "Viddu" Bajpai Mahadev: Omprakash and Radharani's younger daughter; Bhanupriya, Yash and Satya's sister; Mahadev's wife; Kamakshi, Aashish, Ketan, Dheeraj and Priya's mother (2026–present)
  - Nysa as young Vidya (2026)
- Manasi Salvi / Narayani Shastri as Bhanupriya "Bhanu" Bajpai: Omprakash and Radharani's elder daughter; Yash, Vidya and Satya's sister; Vishwa and Rajji's foster mother (2026) / (2026–present)
  - Khushi Bhanushali as young Bhanupriya (2026)
- Deepak Khati as Aashish "Aashu" Mahadev: Mahadev and Vidya's eldest son; Kamakshi, Ketan, Dheeraj and Priya's brother; Mogra's second husband (2026–present)
- Saniya Khera as Mogra Rajvanshi Mahadev: Raju and Lajwanti's elder daughter; Sikander's ex-wife; Aashish's wife (2026–present)
- Mohit Joshi as Ketan "Ketu" Mahadev: Mahadev and Vidya's second son; Kamakshi, Aashish, Dheeraj and Priya's brother; Narmada's husband (2026–present)
- Neha Rana as Narmada "Nimmi" Saini Mahadev: Ramesh's daughter; Ketan's wife (2026–present)
- Aasim Khan as Dheeraj "Dheeru" Mahadev: Mahadev and Vidya's youngest son; Kamakshi, Aashish, Ketan and Priya's brother; Rajji's husband (2026–present)
- Garvita Sadhwani as Rajji Bajpai Mahadev: Bhanupriya's foster daughter; Vishwa's sister; Dheeraj's wife (2026–present)

=== Recurring ===
- Sakshi Sinha as Kamakshi Mahadev: Mahadev and Vidya's elder daughter; Aashish, Ketan, Dheeraj and Priya's sister; Pinky's mother (2026)
- Alaya Umar as Pinky Mahadev: Kamakshi's daughter (2026)
- Khushi Bhanushali as Priya Mahadev: Mahadev and Vidya's younger daughter; Kamakshi, Aashish, Ketan and Dheeraj's sister; Vishwa's love interest (2026–present)
- Abhay Bhargava as Omprakash Bajpai: Radharani's husband; Bhanupriya, Yash, Vidya and Satya's father (2026)
- Nishigandha Wad as Radharani "Radha" Bajpai: Omprakash's widow; Bhanupriya, Yash, Vidya and Satya's mother (2026)
- Ashutosh Tiwari as Yash Bajpai: Omprakash and Radharani's elder son; Bhanupriya, Vidya and Satya's brother; Kiran's husband (2026–present)
- Neelakshii Naithani as Kiran Bajpai: Yash's wife (2026)
- Sham Mashalkar as Satya Bajpai: Omprakash and Radharani's younger son; Bhanupriya, Yash and Vidya's brother (2026–present)
- Bhavya Shinde as Vishwa Bajpai: Bhanupriya's foster son; Rajji's brother; Priya's love interest (2026–present)
- Sagar Rambhia as Raju Rajvanshi: Lajwanti's husband; Mogra's father (2026–present)
- Monika Agnihotri as Lajwanti Rajvanshi: Raju's wife; Mogra's mother (2026–present)
- Yashvi Rajgor as Lajwanti and Raju's younger daughter; Mogra's sister (2026-present)
- Unknown as Ramesh Saini: Narmada's father (2026)
- Spandan Soni as Laksh (2026)
- Kareena Gulabani as Madhu: Ashish's former love interest (2026)
- Hari Singh as Dhruv (2026)
- Ajay Raju as Vendor (2026)
- Ansh Manuja as Kalyan: Rajji's ex-boyfriend and a fraudster (2026)
- Uttar Kumar as Sikander: Mogra's ex-husband (2026)
- Sushmita Sahela as Gargi (2026)
- Abhishek Garg as Monty Rajvansh: Sapna's son (2026) (Dead)
- Ritu Vashisht as DM Sapna Rajvansh: Monty's mother (2026)
- Darpan Srivastava as Inspector Wazir Singh (2026)

=== Guest appearances ===
- Sudhanshu Pandey as Baldev Singh Chauhan from Do Duniya Ek Dil (2026)
- Pravisht Mishra as Krishna Bacchan from Bareilly Ke Bacchan (2026)
- Kinshuk Mahajan as Ganga Bacchan from Bareilly Ke Bacchan (2026)
- Eisha Singh as Advocate Juhi Suri from Juhi Mui (2026)
- Ayub Khan as Advocate Uttam Suri from Juhi Mui (2026)

== Production ==
=== Release ===
In November 2025, Colors TV unveiled a teaser introducing the new show titled Mahadev & Sons.

=== Casting ===
Shakti Anand was selected to portray Mahadev. Sneha Wagh was cast as Vidya. In May 2026, Salvi who played Bhanu quit the series, due to internal conflict with the makers. In October 2026, Narayani Shastri replaced Salvi as Bhanu Bajpai.
