= Bhavani Prakash =

Indian film actress

- Occupation: Actress

Bhavani Prakash is an Indian actress in the Kannada film industry in Karnataka, India.

== Awards ==
Year	Award	Film	Credit	Category	Result	Ref
2017	Filmfare Awards South	Urvi	Actress	Best Supporting Actress	Won	

== Serials ==
Serial	Role	Director
Anavarana	Veena	S.N. Sethuram
Hoo male	Manjari	Dharani G Ramesh
Doresani	Satyavati	Rjesh

Devi

kicchu

mahamayi

nammamma sharade

katheyondu shuruvaagide

arundhati

Adithi rao

gundyan hendthi

neelaambari

== See also ==
- List of people from Karnataka
- Cinema of Karnataka
- List of Indian film actresses
- Cinema of India
