= Manish Khanna =

Indian television actor

- Born: Varanasi, Uttar Pradesh, India
- Occupation: Actor
- Years active: 1993–present

Manish Khanna is an Indian television actor who mostly plays negative roles in television serials. He is known for his roles as Ankush Raheja in Naagin, Akhilesh Raheja inNaagin 2, Balraj Mehra in Pardes Mein Hai Mera Dil, Anand Thakur in Phir Laut Aayi Naagin and Shamsher Kapoor in Udaariyaan.

== Filmography ==
=== Films ===
| Year | Film | Role |
|---|---|---|
| 1999 | Silsila Hai Pyar Ka | |
| 2003 | Zameen | Professor Santhanam |
| 2004 | Julie | Mr. Naidu |
| 2005 | My Wife's Murder | Inspector Wagle |
| 2006 | Jawani Diwani: A Youthful Joyride | Harish Jain |
| 2012 | Bigul | Dabbu |
| 2013 | Mumbai Mirror | Mr. Dutta |
| 2013 | D-Day | Sharyar Bhatti |
| 2014 | Jai Ho | Blackmailer Doctor |
| 2014 | Chal Bhaag | Mamool |
| 2017 | Raktdhar | |
| 2025 | Murderbaad | Sabbir Jalan |

=== Television ===
| Year | Serial | Role |
|---|---|---|
| 1995 | Mano Ya Na Mano | Episode 56 to Episode 60 |
| 1997–1998 | Mahabharat Katha | Rajkumar Viprachitti |
| 1997–2000 | Jai Hanuman | Rajkumar Lakshman |
| 1999 | Jai Hanuman | Rajkumar Arjun |
| 1998–2001 | Aurat | Ranjeet Makhija |
| 2001 | Aane Wala Pal | |
| 2001 | Khoj | Amar (Episode 39 to Episode 41) |
| 2001 | Khoj | Ajay Mahajan (Episode 65) |
| 2001 | Khoj | Advocate Banerjee (Episode 136 & Episode 137) |
| 2001 | Suraag – The Clue | Nimai Bhatt (Episode 102) |
| 2001–2002 | Jai Mahabharat | Rajkumar Arjun |
| 2001–2002 | Kohi Apna Sa | |
| 2002 | Kammal | Rajesh Bhatia |
| 2002 | Joshiley | Jerry (Episode 1 & Episode 2) |
| 2002–2004 | Lipstick | Dinesh Chopra |
| 2003 | 1857 Kranti | Azeemullah |
| 2003 | Ghar Sansaar | Vijay Chaudhary |
| 2003 | CID – The Case of the Mysterious Blasts: Part 2 | Somesh (Episode 268) |
| 2003 | Achanak 37 Saal Baad | Episode 179 |
| 2003 | Jeet | Samay |
| 2003–2004 | Kaahin Kissii Roz | Ratan Raheja |
| 2004 | CID – Better Safe Than Sorry: Part 1 & Part 2 | Security Guard of the National Bank (Episode 295 & Episode 296) |
| 2004 | Bhabhi | Advocate Gandhi |
| 2004 | Devi | Advocate Kriplani |
| 2004 | Raat Hone Ko Hai – House No. 44: Part 2 & Part 3 | Dr. Chakramand (Episode 2 & Episode 3) |
| 2004 | CID – The 15 Year Old Case: Part 2 | Abhay (Episode 318) |
| 2004 | Raat Hone Ko Hai – Bargad | |
| 2005 | K. Street Pali Hill | Advocate (Episode 62 & Episode 64) |
| 2005 | Kyunki Saas Bhi Kabhi Bahu Thi | Advocate Mehta |
| 2005 | CID – Double D.N.A.: Part 2 | Doctor (Episode 358) |
| 2005 | Raat Hone Ko Hai – Shareer: Part 1 to Part 4 | Grover (Episode 209 to Episode 212) |
| 2005 | CID – Abhijeet Sawant Under Arrest: Part 1 | Informer (Episode 370 & Episode 372) |
| 2005 | CID – Code Name Banjara: Part 1 | Informer (Episode 370 & Episode 372) |
| 2005 | Hotel Kingston | Sheel Kumar (Episode 37) |
| 2005 | CID – 3 RAT CAT 3: Part 1 | Max (Episode 386) |
| 2006 | CID Special Bureau – Saazish: Part 1 & Part 2 | Inspector Shashank (Episode 157 & Episode 158) |
| 2006 | CID – Return of the Jewel Thief | Billu (Episode 405) |
| 2006 | CID – Murder in the Safety Vault | Tom (Episode 414) |
| 2006 | Akela | Episode 4 & Episode 5 |
| 2006 | Kahaani Ghar Ghar Kii | Advocate (Episode 1266) |
| 2006 | Akela | Episode 26 |
| 2007 | Kulvaddhu | Advocate Arun Mathur |
| 2007 | Aahat – Return of the Ghost | Season 3 – Episode 5 |
| 2007 | CID – The Case of the Scandalous Murder | Surendra Kumar (Episode 455) |
| 2007 | CID – The Case Of Murder in the Air | Yash Kapri (Episode 465) |
| 2007 | Left Right Left | Faculty Inspector |
| 2007 | CID – The Case of the Uninvited Guest | Subodh (Episode 485) |
| 2007 | Sssshhh...Phir Koi Hai – Suhaag Raat | Jamal (Episode 50) |
| 2007 | CID – Ek Lapata Ladki | Preetam (Episode 497) |
| 2007–2008 | Doli Saja Ke | Viren |
| 2008 | Sssshhh...Phir Koi Hai – Do Gaz Zameen Ke Neeche: Part 1 & Part 2 | Shreekant Goel (Episode 72 & Episode 73) |
| 2008 | CID – Khooni Swimming Pool | Kondrak's Younger Brother (Episode 508) |
| 2008 | Sssshhh...Phir Koi Hai – Khoon Ka Badla Khoon: Part 1 & Part 2 | Pankaj Chopra (Episode 118 & Episode 119) |
| 2008–2009 | Aathvaan Vachan | |
| 2009 | CID – Khooni Khabar | Rakesh Kumar (Episode 572) |
| 2009 | CID – Khooni Naqab | Raj (Episode 582) |
| 2010 | Adaalat – CID Officer Abhijeet Adaalat Mein | Professor Pranay Dasgupta (Episode 3 & Episode 20) |
| 2011 | Adaalat – K.D. Pathak Jail Mein | Professor Pranay Dasgupta (Episode 3 & Episode 20) |
| 2012–2014 | Pyaar Ka Dard Hai Meetha Meetha Pyaara Pyaara | Govardhan Kaneria |
| 2013 | Savdhaan India | Episode 315 |
| 2013 | Pavitra Rishta | Kashinath Sharma |
| 2013 | Savdhaan India | Episode 510 |
| 2014 | Savdhaan India | Episode 562 |
| 2014 | Baal Veer | Kancha Cheena |
| 2014 | Savdhaan India | Episode 613 |
| 2014 | Ishq Kills | Mr. Chaddha (Episode 4) |
| 2014 | The Adventures of Hatim | Shaitaan Grovan |
| 2014 | Encounter | Babu Rode (Episode 13 & Episode 14) |
| 2015 | Razia Sultan | Taj al-Din Yildiz |
| 2015–2016 | Naagin | Ankush Raheja |
| 2016 | Yeh Hai Mohabbatein | Shyam Raichand |
| 2016 | Adaalat | Advocate Vidyut (Season 2 – Episode 5) |
| 2016–2017 | Pardes Mein Hai Mera Dil | Balraj Mehra |
| 2016–2017 | Naagin 2 | Akhilesh Raheja |
| 2017 | CID – Imtihaan Ki Ghadi | Vikrant (Episode 1427) |
| 2017 | Savdhaan India | Episode 2119 |
| 2017 | Yeh Moh Moh Ke Dhaagey | Laalji |
| 2017 | Peshwa Bajirao | Bahadur Shah I |
| 2017 | Aarambh: Kahaani Devsena Ki | Vishwadeep |
| 2017–2019 | Siddhi Vinayak | Shankar Kundra |
| 2018 | CID – Daya Ek Hatyara | Hiten (Episode 1485) |
| 2018 | Savdhaan India | Episode 2370 |
| 2018 | Qayamat Ki Raat | Prithvi Singh Suryavanshi |
| 2018 | CID – Cricket Dhamaka | Ranjeet (Episode 1530) |
| 2019 | Dil Toh Happy Hai Ji | Shyamnik Bhatia |
| 2019–2020 | Phir Laut Aayi Naagin | Anand Thakur |
| 2020 | Ishq Subhan Allah | Jalali |
| 2020 | Kumkum Bhagya | Dushyant Singh Chaubey |
| 2020 | Brahmarakshas 2 | Jwala |
| 2021 | Brahmarakshas 2 | Iravat |
| 2021 | Molkki | Charan Singh Chaudhary |
| 2021 | Mauka-E-Vardaat | |
| 2021 | Lovepantii | Ranjana's Father |
| 2021 | Meet: Badlegi Duniya Ki Reet | Jaypratap Singh |
| 2022 | Ghar Ek Mandir – Kripa Agrasen Maharaj Ki | Advocate V. K. Mahajan |
| 2022 | Rang Jaun Tere Rang Mein | Raghunandan |
| 2022 | Harphoul Mohini | Bhaiji |
| 2022 | Banni Chow Home Delivery | Param Kapoor |
| 2022–2023 | Udaariyaan | Shamsher Kapoor |
| 2023 | Sindoor Ki Keemat | Nirmal |
| 2023 | Maitree | Madan Tiwari |
| 2023 | Ghum Hai Kisikey Pyaar Meiin | Ramakant Pujari |
| 2023 | Dhruv Tara – Samay Sadi Se Pare | Maharaj Vikramjeet Singh |
| 2024 | Shrimad Ramayan | Jabali |
| 2024 | Pracchand Ashok | Maharaj Chaitraj |
| 2024 | Pushpa Impossible | Advocate Somnath Suryavanshi |
| 2024 | Deewani | Madan Thakur |
| 2024 | Baalveer 4 | Badrinath/Bhasma |
| 2025 | Dhaakad Beera | Brijpal |
| 2026 | Itti Si Khushi | Yash Sethi |
| 2026 | Juhi Mui | Advocate Raichand |
