= Hoo Male =

Indian Kannada television drama

- Genre: Drama
- Written by: Nikitha Gowri
- Directed by: Dharani G. Ramesh
- Creative director: Krishna
- Starring: See below
- Composer: Vishak Ramprasad
- Country of origin: India
- Original language: Kannada
- No. of episodes: 254

Production
- Producer: Prakash
- Production location: Bengaluru
- Camera setup: Multi-camera
- Running time: 9:00 PM
- Production company: Jai Matha Combines

Original release
- Network: Colors Kannada
- Release: 4 February 2020 – 21 November 2021

Hoo Male (transl. Flower Rain) is an Indian Kannada television drama that premiered on Colors Kannada on 16 November 2020. The show is official remake of Hindi TV Serial Choti Sarrdaarni. The show ended on 16 October 2021 after airing 254 episodes.

== Plot ==
Carefree and bubbly, Lahari falls in love with Mukund, who runs a local restaurant. Lahari becomes pregnant with his child. Lahari's mother, Corporator Kaveri, learns of Lahari's pregnancy and relationship with Mukund. She refuses to accept Mukund as he is financially unstable. Kaveri invites him to her house and stabs him, and tries to kill her unborn child. She wants Lahari to marry a widower, Yaduveer, who is the president of the ruling party in Bangalore. Yaduveer has a 5-year-old son, Ishan". Kaveri forces Lahari to marry Yaduveer because she wants to become an MLA. At first, Lahari refuses the marriage proposal but later agrees to save her unborn child from Kaveri's ill intentions.

On their wedding night, she reveals her pregnancy to Yaduveer and pleads him to let her go as she wants to settle far away and bring up her child. Yaduveer gets angry but later promises to have her settled in Tamil Nadu. However, Yaduveer, Lahari and Ishan visit Tamil Nadu with a new identity. But, Yaduveer is accused of killing Lahari and is arrested and taken to Karnataka. Lahari is kidnapped by goons and discovers what happened to Yaduveer. She escapes from there and rescues Yaduveer from the false accusation with the help of her eldest brother, Uday. Yaduveer accepts her child as his own. Yaduveer and Lahari tell Ishan about her pregnancy. Excited, Ishan reveals this to everyone. A grand party is organized to celebrate Lahari's pregnancy news. Soon, Yaduveer's sister, Ambika finds out that the baby is not Yaduveer's and blames Lahari. Her behaviour towards Lahari changes after that.

== Cast ==
- Chandana Ananthakrishna as Lahari – Kaveri's daughter; Mukund's ex-fiancée; Yaduveer's wife; Ishaan's step-mother
- Yeaswanth as Yaduveer – Ambika's brother; Lahari's husband; Ishaan's father
- Vikas Gowda as Mukund – Lahari's ex-fiancé
- Sujatha Akshaya as Corporator Kaveri – Lahari's mother
- Dheeru as Ishaan – Yaduveer's son; Lahari's step-son
- Arohi Naina as Ambika – Yaduveer's sister

== Adaptations ==
Language	Title	Original release	Network(s)	Last aired	Notes
Hindi	Choti Sarrdaarni छोटी सरदारनी	1 July 2019	Colors TV	10 June 2022	Original
Tamil	Uyire உயிரே	2 January 2020	Colors Tamil	27 March 2021	Remake
Kannada	Hoo Male ಹೂಮಳೆ	16 November 2020	Colors Kannada	16 October 2021	Remake
