= Megha Barsenge =

Indian drama television series

- Genre: Melodrama; Romance; Social issue
- Created by: Saurabh Tewari
- Developed by: Shivani Shah
- Screenplay by: Ira Arya; Pranjal Saxena; Dialogue: Shahank Kunwar
- Story by: Amitabh Singh
- Directed by: Sangeetha Aashish Rao; Mangesh Kanthale; Vipul Mishra
- Creative director: Raj Kumar Yadav
- Starring: Neha Rana; Neil Bhatt
- Composer: Manas Shikhar
- Country of origin: India
- Original language: Hindi
- No. of seasons: 1
- No. of episodes: 323

Production
- Producer: Saurabh Tewari
- Production location: Mumbai
- Cinematography: Kunal V Kadham
- Editors: Anurag Singh; Hervir Singh Pal
- Camera setup: Multi-camera
- Running time: 21 minutes
- Production company: Parin Multimedia

Original release
- Network: Colors TV
- Release: 6 August 2024 – 26 June 2025

Megha Barsenge is an Indian Hindi-language television drama series that aired from 6 August 2024 to 26 June 2025 on Colors TV. It is digitally available on JioHotstar. Produced by Saurabh Tewari under Parin Multimedia, it stars Neha Rana and Neil Bhatt. It is set in a Punjabi backdrop, taking place in Amritsar.

== Plot ==
Megha Khurana, an aspiring choreographer whom plans to start an dance academy lives with her family in Amritsar. Megha's parents had fixed Megha's marriage to an NRI, Manoj, but he proves to be a fraud who has cheated many women as his parents support him in his crimes. Manoj marries Megha and after marriage, Manoj's parents, Sadanand and Kavitha both mistreat and huimilates Megha as Manoj took 25 lakhs from Megha's father, Surinder, for her future and goes to Georgia. Investigating, Megha goes to Georgia and meets an IAS officer, Arjun Talwar. He befriends Megha and is in pursuit of Manoj. Arjun reveals Manoj's crimes to Megha. Manoj learns that Megha is aware of his crimes. So Manoj falsely accuses Megha and has her jailed.

Arjun bails Megha and fights Manoj. Arjun and Megha fall in love. Arjun and Megha return to India and explain the truth about Manoj to her family. But Manoj seeks Megha. Arjun's patriarchal aunt, Navjot, troubles Megha and her family, who asked her to stay away from Arjun's life and also helps Manoj. Megha and Arjun expose Manoj's crimes to Manoj's girlfriend Amy, who then slaps Manoj and abandons him. Megha and Manoj divorce, then Megha and Arjun marry. Navjot creates problems for Megha. Arjun and Megha learn that the parents of Manoj's first wife, Nupur, filed a missing complaint.

Megha and Arjun gather evidence but Manoj discovers this and kidnaps Megha and reveals how he killed Nupur after she discovered his crimes and later took her kidney and puts her body inside the freezer for 6 years. Arjun saves Megha and they expose Manoj to Nupur's family and have him arrested. Megha realises she is pregnant with Manoj's child. Manoj learns of this, escapes from jail, and kidnaps Megha. Manoj holds Megha on a cliff as Arjun and other police officers try to save her. Arjun's father, KP Talwar, shoots Manoj, who falls off the cliff and is presumed dead.

Megha discovers KP Talwar had mistreated many women when her mother, Ranjeeta, arrests a human trafficker, Mr. Bhatti, and learns KP had an extramarital affair with Megha's aunt, Goldie. Goldie reveals KP's true nature to Megha and Megha exposes KP to the family but the family does not believe her as KP oppresses and tries to harm Megha. Megha files a case against KP with evidence as the court had issued an arrest warrant against him. Arjun and the other family members discover KP's crimes. But Navjot kills KP and leads the family and Arjun to believe that Megha killed him, so Arjun and the family hates her. Megha seeks evidence regarding KP's death. But things got worsened when Manoj returns to snatch Arjun and Megha's child pretending to be mentally unstable.

Surinder blackmails Navjot due to her involvement in KP's murder, which he had witnessed. Megha learns that Navjot killed KP, and exposes her and gets her arrested. Manoj kidnaps Megha and brings her to Bandipur in Nepal. Manoj rules Bandipur as a king. Arjun tries to save Megha from Manoj. Manoj is married to Alka as Alka decided to help Megha and Arjun to escape. Megha gives birth to a daughter, Mannu, but Manoj wants a son threatens to kill his daughter. Manoj forces Megha to hang Arjun. Arjun is presumed dead but promises to save Megha and her daughter from Manoj.

Megha is forced to live with Manoj for 7 years and raises their daughter, Mannu, as she hides her gender from Manoj, who mistreats Megha. Alka, who adopts Mannu, oppresses Megha and becomes evil. Arjun returns and bonds with Mannu and reunites with Megha, but Alka learns and exposes Mannu's truth to Manoj. Mannu starts to hate Manoj and considers Arjun after learning of Manoj's truth. Manoj tries to kill Mannu but is saved by Megha's parents, Surinder and Ranjeeta. Alka kills Surinder but Megha cuts Manoj's leg. Manoj and Alka trick Arjun and kill him and they kidnap Mannu. Manoj brings his parents, Sadanand and Kavita whom takes Mannu back to India where she is brought to Sadanand's nephew and Manoj's uncle, Trilochan's house at Moga. Manoj's family mistreat Mannu in which they uses her in a robbery where they attacked and kills a man named, Ajay Khanna and assaults his wife, Sangeeta. Mannu manages to save their son but the boy blames Mannu for the death of his father and tooks her bracelet vowing to seek revenge. While Mannu blames the family for her misery so she decides to take revenge against Manoj and his family.

10 years later, Mannu, now renamed Jr. Megha, has grown into a strong rebellious woman who works as an NGO worker. Megha still hates Manoj and his family, and she still misses her family. Heer, Trilochan's sister, adopts Megha and hates their family's crimes. But however, Jr. Megha is still not recovered from that past incident tries to meet the boy whom had blamed her for his father's death. Manoj and his family bring Kabir, Arjun's look-alike, as Manoj plans to sell Megha to Canada. Kabir had the bracelet of Jr. Megha whom had stolen from her and is eagerly waiting for his revenge as Kabir is revealed to be the same boy whom he blames Jr. Megha for his father's murder in their childhood as his mother, Sangeeta is in coma due to the incident after 10 years. Unaware of their identities, Jr. Megha starts to hate Kabir.

Manoj and his family tricks Jr. Megha by kidnapping her and brings her to Canada where she was takened by human trafficker, Sultana whom they plan to sell Jr. Megha. But Kabir manages to save her where he discovers her identity. But both Kabir and Jr. Megha gets Sultana and her gangs to be arrested and the escaped from Canada. They apologise to each other and Kabir proposes his love interest to Jr. Megha which she rejects citing her past traumas. Then Jr. Megha gets learns Sr. Megha is alive and goes for a hunt to find her back. Kabir assures to accompany her and finds her the map to Bandipur.

It is revealed that Arjun had dug out a secret tunnel connecting India and Bandipur 10 years back for Jr. and Sr. Megha's escape. Jr. Megha and Kabir go by that secret tunnel way and reach Bandipur. Jr. Megha takes revenge where she destroys Manoj's business, freezing his and his family members's bank accounts and they seizes their truck by police. Kabir and Jr. Megha finds Sr. Megha where they both reunites and Sr. Megha kills Manoj thus completing their revenge. Sr. Megha, Kabir and Jr. Megha then get away from Bandipur and live their lives peacefully. The story ends with Sr. Megha's monolog of remembering her love, Arjun and the tough situations she had fought in her life, reminding everyone to not lose their grit and resilience.

== Cast ==
=== Main ===
- Neha Rana as double role
  - Megha Arjun Talwar (formerly Kohli): Surinder and Ranjeeta's daughter; Arjun's widow; Jr. Megha's mother (2024–2025)
  - Jr. Megha "Mannu" Talwar: Megha and Manoj's daughter; Arjun's step-daughter (2025)
    - Miraya Sehgal as Child Mannu (2025)
- Neil Bhatt as double role
  - IAS Arjun Talwar: KP and Shagun's son: Megha's husband; Jr. Megha's step-father (2024–2025)
  - Singer Kabir Khanna: Sangeeta and Ajay's son (2025)
    - Heet Sharma as Child Kabir (2025)

=== Recurring ===
- Rinku Dhawan as Navjot Talwar: KP and CP's elder sister (2024–2025)
- Deepraj Rana as
  - Inspector KP Talwar: Navjot and CP's elder brother (2024–2025)
  - CP Talwar: Navjot and KP's younger brother (2024)
- Madhavi Chopra as Shagun Talwar: Parul and Phagun's younger sister (2024–2025)
- Deep Joshi as Sikandar Talwar: CP's son (2024–2025)
- Falaq Naaz as Mandeep "Mandy" Talwar: Sikandar's wife (2024–2025)
- Akshay Anand as Surinder Khurana: Goldie's elder brother (2024–2025)
- Geeta Bisht as Inspector Ranjeeta Khurana: Surinder's widow (2024−2025)
- Sahil Bhasin as Kripal Khurana: Surinder and Ranjeeta's elder son (2024–2025)
- Ghazal Sood as Riya Khurana: Kripal's wife (2024–2025)
- Deepshikha Nagpal as Goldie Khurana: Surinder's younger sister (2024–2025)
- Yajuvendra Singh as Sadanand Kohli: Trilochan's elder brother; Kavita's husband (2024−2025)
- Preeti Singh as Kavita Kohli: Sadanand's wife (2024−2025)
- Kinshuk Mahajan as
  - Manoj Kohli: Sadanand and Kavita's son; Sr.Megha's ex-husband; Alka's husband; Mannu(Jr.Megha's)father (2024–2025)(Dead)
  - Mathew Pareira: Manoj's false identity (2024)
- Unknown as Nupur Kohli: Mr. Sharma and Swati's daughter (2024)
- Kajal Sharma as Alka Kohli: Ghooran's daughter (2025)
- Ravi Gossain as Trilochan Kohli aka Tilli: Sadanand's nephew; Heer's elder brother (2025)
- Redheemaa Gupta as Satpal Kohli: Trilochan's wife (2025)
- Arshi Shrivastava as Jasleen Kohli: Satpal and Trilochan's daughter (2025)
  - Nancy Makwana as Child Jasleen (2025)
- Kajal Chawla as Heer Kohli: Sadanand nephew; Trilochan's younger sister (2025)
- Unknown as Ajay Khanna: Sangeeta's husband (2025)
- Unknown as Sangeeta Khanna: Ajay's widow; Kabir's mother (2025)
- Sonam Malik as Sonam: Megha's friend (2024)
- Ankush Kukreja as Rajbeer: Sonam's ex-fiancée (2024)
- Daria Gavrushenko as Amy: Manoj's ex-girlfriend (2024)
- Unknown as Mr. Sharma: Nupur's father (2024)
- Unknown as Swati Sharma: Nupur's mother (2024)
- Harsh Keshri as Reporter (2024)
- Ankit Kumar Tiwari as Doctor (2024)
- Gayatri Madhavan as Sneha (2025)
- Unknown as Mr. Bhatti: KP's accomplice; a human trafficker (2025)
- Sneha Jain as Mukta Jaiswal: Arjun's ex-girlfriend; Megha's rival; Navjot and Sikandar's accomplice (2025)
- Unknown as Ghooran: Alka's father (2025)
- Raza Murad as Bakhtawar Seth (2025)
- Soni Singh as Sultana (2025)
- Mansi Chadwani as Sultana's henchwomen (2025)

== Production ==
=== Development ===
In June 2024, Colors TV announced a new series titled Megha Barsenge.

=== Casting ===
Neha Rana was selected to portray Megha. Neil Bhatt was selected to portray Arjun. Kinshuk Mahajan was cast as Manoj Kohli. He lost 10 kilograms to fit in the role. In September 2024, Rinku Dhawan entered as Navjot Talwar.

== Crossovers ==
- On 6 November 2024, Suman Indori had a crossover with Megha Barsenge.
- On 13 November 2024, the show had a crossover episode with Parineetii.
