= Avinesh Rekhi =

Indian television actor

- Occupation: Actor
- Years active: 2008–present
- Known for: Tu Sooraj Main Saanjh, Piyaji; Choti Sarrdaarni
- Spouse: Raisa (m. 2010)
- Children: 2

Avinesh Rekhi is an Indian television actor known for his performances in Madhubala – Ek Ishq Ek Junoon, Tu Sooraj Main Saanjh, Piyaji and Choti Sarrdaarni.

== Personal life ==
Rekhi married his girlfriend of 8 years, Raisa, on 29 December 2010. They have two children, a son and a daughter.

== Films journey ==
Rekhi began his career with a small role in the 2008 film Ru Ba Ru. Another unnoticed role in the 2009 film Dil Bole Hadippa! failed to earn him fame.

== Television career ==
Rekhi's first television show was Colors TV's suspense thriller Chhal – Sheh Aur Maat in 2012, where he played the lead character Kabir Jaiswal.

In 2013, he was seen as the antagonist Sultan Kundra in Colors TV's Madhubala – Ek Ishq Ek Junoon. From 2013 to 2014, he essayed the parallel lead Neeraj Sachdeva in the psychological thriller Main Naa Bhoolungi.

In 2015, Rekhi bagged the role of Mughal emperor Akbar in Sony Entertainment Television's historical period drama Bharat Ka Veer Putra – Maharana Pratap. He then had an episodic role on &TV's Darr Sabko Lagta Hai in 2016.

His first major breakthrough show was Star Plus's Tu Sooraj Main Saanjh, Piyaji which began airing in April 2017. In the show he starred as the main lead Uma Shankar Toshniwal opposite Rhea Sharma.

From July 2019 to July 2021, Rekhi starred as Sarabjit Singh Gill in Colors TV's Choti Sarrdaarni alongside Nimrit Kaur Ahluwala.

== Filmography ==
=== Films ===
- Ru Ba Ru
- Dil Bole Hadippa!

=== Television ===
Year	Serial	Role	Notes
2012	Chhal – Sheh Aur Maat	Kabir Jaiswal	Lead Role
2013	Madhubala – Ek Ishq Ek Junoon	Sultan Kundra	Supporting Role
2013–2014	Main Naa Bhoolungi	Neeraj Sachdev	Supporting Role
2015	Bharat Ka Veer Putra – Maharana Pratap	Akbar	Supporting Role
2016	Darr Sabko Lagta Hai – Keemat	Akash Kumar (Episode 22)	Episodic Role
2017–2018	Tu Sooraj Main Saanjh, Piyaji	Umashankar Toshniwal	Lead Role
2019–2021	Choti Sarrdaarni	Sarabjeet Singh Gill	Lead Role
2021–2022	Tere Bina Jiya Jaye Na	Devraj Singh Rathore	Lead Role
2022	Tere Bina Jiya Jaye Na	Dakshraj Singh Rathore	Negative Role
2023–2024	Ikk Kudi Punjab Di	Ranjha Singh Atwal	Lead Role
2024	Udaariyaan	Sarabjeet Singh Aulakh	Lead Role
2025	Chakravarti Samrat Prithviraj Chauhan	Mahmud of Ghazni	Negative Role
2025	Chalo Bulawa Aya Hai, Mata Ne Bulaya Hai	Sagar Singh Lodhi	Supporting Role
2025–2026	Ganesh Kartikey	Shiva	
