= Choti Sarrdaarni =

Indian television drama series (2019-2022)

- Genre: Romance; Melodrama
- Created by: Ranjeev Verma Nitu Verma
- Screenplay by: Rahul Pandey; Dialogues; Rajesh Chawla
- Story by: Ranjeev Verma; Nitu Verma; Faizal Akhter; Pallavi Mehta
- Directed by: Jaladh K. Sharma; Rajeev Srivastava
- Creative directors: Pushpa Porwal; Richa Singh Gautam
- Starring: See below
- Theme music composer: Nishant Raja
- Composer: Monu Music India
- Country of origin: India
- Original language: Hindi
- No. of seasons: 2
- No. of episodes: 810

Production
- Producers: Rajesh Ram Singh; Pradeep Kumar; Piya Bajpayee; Shaika Parween
- Editors: Paresh Shah; Ayan Hashmi
- Camera setup: Multi-camera
- Running time: 20–25 minutes
- Production companies: Cockcrow and Shaika Entertainment

Original release
- Network: Colors TV
- Release: 1 July 2019 – 10 June 2022

Related
- Uyire; Hoo Male

Choti Sarrdaarni (transl. Young Sarrdaarni) is an Indian Hindi language romantic drama television series produced by Cockcrow and Shaika Entertainment. It premiered on 1 July 2019 on Colors TV and ended on 10 June 2022 completing 810 episodes. It starred Nimrit Kaur Ahluwalia, Avinesh Rekhi and Mahir Pandhi.

== Plot ==
Carefree and bubbly, Meher Kaur Dhillon falls in love with Manav Sharma who dream's to become an IAS and gets pregnant with his child. Meher's mother, Kulwant Kaur Dhillon, who is sarpanch of the village, and also a very proud and arrogant woman refuses to accept financially unstable Manav and thus stabs him and throws him into a river. She forces Meher to marry Sarabjit Singh Gill, the widowed president of Amritsar, who also has a 5-year-old son Paramjit so that she could become the MLA and also ensure Meher gets married into a rich and secure family. To save her unborn child from Kulwant, Meher agrees to the marriage.

On the wedding night, Meher reveals her pregnancy to Sarab, who initially gets very upset. Meher however develops a very close bond with Param. Meher intends to leave the two and reside in Serbia with her unborn son, however, she and Sarab realize their love for each other. Sarab accepts her child. Sarab's sister, Harleen finds out the truth about Meher's pregnancy and pretends to accept it for Sarab. Meher gives birth to a son, Karanjit Singh Gill. Harleen and Sarab's half-sister, Aditi, come into Sarab and Meher's life, along with her fiance CBI officer Vikram Diwan (who turns out to be Manav itself). Many trials and tribulations occur, including the fight over Karan's custody, nonetheless, everything is sorted out in the end. Aditi and Manav fall in love and marry and Karan remains with Sarab and Meher. Later on, Meher is jailed for the allegation of murdering her brother Jagga and Sarab fails to save her.

=== 5 years later ===
After completing her sentence, Meher resides in Kashmir with her daughter, Seher. Sarab, Karan and Param return to India from abroad and meet them unexpectedly. Later, it is revealed that the Gills' accountant, Tarkash killed Jagga to get some past revenge from Meher and gets jailed. Sarab reconciles with Meher, and also accepts Seher. He also unites Meher with her living father, Trilochan Singh Dhillon, who Meher thought was dead all these years. However sadly later, Sarab and Meher both die in a car accident.

=== 16 years later ===
Param, Karan and Seher are grown up. Seher bestfriends Rajveer Singh Babbar, who immediately falls in love with her. However, Seher is already engaged to her lover, Kunal Malhotra, who is later killed by Rajveer's CM sister, Harshdeep. Finally, Seher and Rajveer marry and soon fall in love. Rajveer leaves Harshdeep upon knowing she killed Kunal, and moves to the Gill mansion. It is revealed that Seher's cousin, Khushi Bajwa loved Rajveer and also had a 4-year-old child named Prince whose real father is her friend Avinash Gupta. After Khushi leaves, Seher and Rajveer adopt Prince.

Kulwant reveals to Seher about her illegitimate granddaughter, Mannat Kaur who was left by her due to social fear. Grown up, she now lives in Dalhousie with her mother Harnoor, who later dies after revealing to Mannat about Dhillons. Seher decides to get Mannat back. Mannat comes across Dolly's grandson, Zorawar Singh Randhawa in Dalhousie, and then arrives in Attari to live with Gills and Dhillons, hiding her identity. Later, Kulwant finds Mannat's truth and reunites with her. Eventually, Seher and others too find that Mannat is Bittu and Harnoor's daughter.

Later, Zorawar and Mannat falls in love with each other. However, Kulwant decides to get Mannat married to Nirvair and Dolly decides to get Zorawar married to Scarlet. However, Kulwant later gives in to Mannat's demands and gets her married to Zorawar. The family comes together and clicks a family photo alongside the portrait of Sarab and Meher while Choti Sarrdaarni comes to an end.

== Cast ==
=== Main ===
- Nimrit Kaur Ahluwalia as
  - Meher Kaur Dhillon Gill: Kulwant and Trilochan's daughter; Jagjit, Baljeet and Ranbir's sister; Manav's ex-lover; Sarabjeet's wife; Karan and Seher's mother; Paramjeet's step-mother (2019-2021; dead)
  - Seher Kaur Gill Babbar: Meher and Sarabjeet's daughter; Param and Karan's half-sister; Rajveer's wife; Diljit's adoptive mother (2021-2022)
    - Kevina Tak as child Seher (2021)
- Avinesh Rekhi as Sarabjeet "Sarab" Singh Gill: An honest businessman and politician; Smriti and Sukhwinder's son; Harleen's brother; Aditi's half-brother; Simran's widower; Meher's second husband; Param and Seher's father; Karanjeet's step-father (2019-2021; dead)
- Mahir Pandhi as Rajveer "Raj" Singh Babbar: Devender's son; Harshdeep's brother; Seher's husband; Diljit's adoptive father (2021-2022)
- Amandeep Sidhu as Mannat Kaur Dhillon Randhawa: Harnoor and Baljeet's daughter; Jeevani's step-daughter; Guilzar's half-sister; Zorawar's wife (2022)
  - Zara Khan as child Mannat (2021–2022)
- Gaurav S Bajaj as Zorawar Singh Randhawa: Simrat and Inderpal's son; Kiara's brother; Mannat's husband (2022)
  - Vihaan Thakkar as child Zorawar (2022)

=== Recurring ===
==== Dhillons ====
- Unknown as Trilochan Singh Dhillon: An honest army officer; Kulwant's husband; Jagjit, Meher, Baljeet and Ranbir's father; Yuvraj, Karan, Seher, Mannat, Gullu and Cherry's grandfather; Paramjeet's step-grandfather (2021)
- Anita Raj as Kulwant Kaur Dhillon: A dishonest businesswoman; Trilochan's widow; Jagjit, Baljeet, Ranbir and Meher's mother; Yuvi, Karan, Seher, Mannat, Gulzar and Chahat's grandmother (2019–2022)
- Amal Sehrawat as Jagjit "Jagga" Singh Dhillon: A dishonest police officer; Kulwant and Trilochan's eldest son; Baljeet, Ranbir and Meher's brother; Amrita's husband; Yuvi's father (2019–2021; dead)
- Abhilasha Jakhar as Amrita Kaur Dhillon: Jagjit's widow; Yuvi's mother (2019–2021; dead)
- Ravi Chhabra as Yuvraj "Yuvi" Singh Dhillon: Amrita and Jagjit's son (2021)
  - Dhan Tejas as teenage Yuvraj (2021)
  - Advit Sood as child Yuvraj (2019–2021)
- Abhishek Jangra as Baljeet "Bittu" Singh Dhillon: Kulwant and Trilochan's second son; Jagjit, Ranbir and Meher's brother; Harnoor's former lover; Jeevani's husband; Mannat and Gullu's father (2019–2022)
- Yuvleen Kaur as Jeevani "Jeeto" Kaur Dhillon: Baljeet's wife; Gullu's mother; Mannat's step-mother (2019–2022)
- Raanav Sharma as Gulzar "Gullu" Singh Dhillon: Jeevani and Baljeet's son; Mannat's half-brother (2021–2022)
- Abhianshu Vohra as Ranbir "Ranna" Singh Dhillon: Kulwant and Trilochan's youngest son; Jagjit, Baljeet and Meher's brother; Ginni's husband; Chahat's father (2019–2022)
- Jinal Jain/Geetika Mehandru as Ginni Bajwa Kaur Dhillon: Vidita's daughter; Robbie's sister; Ranna's wife; Chahat's mother (2019–2022)
- Ravya Sadhwani as Chahat "Cherry" Kaur Dhillon: Ginni and Ranna's daughter (2021–2022)

==== Gills ====
- Unknown as Simran Kohli Kaur Gill: Neerja and Avtaar's daughter; Sarabjeet's first wife; Paramjeet's mother (2019; dead)
- Shehzada Dhami/Vineet Raina/Hitanshu Jinsi as Paramjeet "Param" Singh Gill: Sarabjeet and Simran's son; Meher's step-son; Seher and Karanjeet's half-brother; Devika's ex-fiancé (2021)/(2021–2022)/(2022)
  - Aekam Binjwe as teenage Paramjeet (2021)
  - Kevina Tak as child Paramjeet (2019–2021)
- Adhik Mehta as Karanjeet "Karan" Singh Gill: Meher and Manav's son; Sarabjeet's step-son; Seher and Paramjeet's half-brother (2021-2022)
  - Gaurika Sharma as child Karanjeet (2021)
  - Aayat Khan as baby Karanjeet (2020–2021)
- Puneet Issar as Beant Singh Gill: Sukhwinder's brother; Amrit's husband (2021)
- Rinku Dhawan as Amrit Kaur Gill: Beant's wife (2021)

==== Diwans ====
- Kaushal Kapoor as Surya Diwan: Seema's husband; Vikram's father; Manav's foster father (2020) (Dead)
- Vishavpreet Kaur as Seema Diwan: Surya's widow; Vikram's mother; Manav's foster mother (2020)
- Hitesh Bharadwaj as Manav Sharma/CBI officer Vikram Diwan: Surya and Seema's adoptive son; Meher's first husband; Aditi's husband; Karanjeet's father (2019–2021)
- Drishti Garewal as Dr. Aditi Kaur Gill Sharma/Diwan: Sukhwinder's daughter; Harleen and Sarabjeet's half-sister; Manav/Vikram’s wife (2020–2021)

==== Bajwas ====
- Neelu Kohli as Vidita Bajwa: Rubinder and Ginni's mother; Khushi and Chahat's grandmother; Diljit's great-grandmother (2020)
- Krishna Soni as Rubinder "Robbie" Bajwa: Vidita's son; Ginni's brother; Harleen's husband; Khushi's father; Diljit's grandfather (2019–2022)
- Mansi Sharma/Simran Sachdeva as Harleen Kaur Gill Bajwa: Smriti and Sukhwinder's daughter; Sarabjeet's sister; Aditi's half-sister; Rubinder's wife; Khushi's mother; Diljit's grandmother (2019; 2021–2022) / (2019–2021)
- Sheetal Ranjankar/Jazz Sodhi as Khushi Bajwa: Harleen and Robbie's daughter; Avinash's former lover; Diljit's mother (2022)
  - Hanshika Rajput as child Khushi (2019–2021)

==== Babbars ====
- Het Patel/Laksh Pravin Jain/Ravya Sadhwani as Diljit "Prince" Singh Babbar: Khushi and Avinash's son; Seher and Rajveer's adopted son (2022)
- Vibha Chibber as Harshdeep Kaur Babbar Gadgill: Devender's daughter; Rajveer's sister; Kulbir's wife (2021)
- Prakash Ramchandani as Kuljeet Singh Gadgill: Harshdeep's husband (2021)
- Raju Pandit as Balwinder Singh Babbar: Devender's brother; Rimple's husband (2021)
- Mamta Luthra/Alka Badola Kaushal as Rimple Kaur Babbar: Balwinder's wife (2021)

==== Randhawas ====
- Dolly Minhas as Daljeet "Dolly" Shergill Randhawa: Jolly and Smriti's sister; Inderpal's mother; Kiara and Zorawar's grandmother (2019–2022)
- Karan Mehat as Inderpal Singh Randhawa: Daljeet's son; Simrat's husband; Kiara and Zorawar's father (2022)
- Harleen Kaur Rekhi as Simrat Kaur Randhawa: Inderpal's wife; Kiara and Zorawar's mother (2022)
- Astha Agarwal as Kiara Kaur Randhawa: Simrat and Inderpal's daughter; Zorawar's sister (2022)

==== Others ====
- Richa Soni as DSP Tara Singh Chautala (2019)
- Ranjeev Verma as Jolly Shergill: Dolly and Smriti's brother (2019)
- Avtar Gill as Avtaar Kohli: Neerja's husband; Simran's father; Paramjeet's grandfather (2019)
- Vineeta Malik as Neerja Kohli: Avtaar's wife; Simran's mother; Paramjeet's grandmother (2019)
- Shivani Gosain as Vijeyta Malik: Income tax officer (2019)
- Neha Narang as Preeti (2019)
- Ahmad Harhash as Sameer Arora (2019)
- Shivendraa Om Saainiyol as Tarkash: Gill family accountant; Arati's husband; Ritu's father; Jagga's murderer (2019–2021)
- Bhavini Gandhi as Arati: Tarkash's wife; Ritu's mother (2020–2021)
- Krisha Pandirkar as Ritu: Tarkash and Arati's daughter; Paramjeet and Yuvraj's friend (2020–2021)
- Delnaaz Irani as Kristan Martha: Meher and Sarab's boss in Serbia (2020)
- Jai Vats as Dr. Surinder Sodhi (2020)
- Mala Salariya as Dr. Sanjana Shinde (2020)
- Unknown as Sandhu's father (2020)
- Lokesh Batta as
  - Mr. Sandhu: Ginni's ex-fiancé (2020)
  - Nirvair Singh Brar: Mannat's ex-fiancé (2022)
- Prakhar Shukla as Blackmailer (2020)
- Varun Toorkey as Kunal Malhotra: Seher's ex-fiancé (2021) (Dead)
- Apara Mehta as Manmita Chaddha: Seher, Karanjeet and Paramjeet's caretaker; Tricky's grandmother (2021)
- Prince Rochlani as Tricky Chaddha: Manmita's grandson; Paramjeet, Karanjeet and Seher's brother-figure (2021)
- Mandeep Bamra/Acherr Bharadwaj as Nikhil Deol: Anurita's brother; Rajveer's friend (2021)
- Neha Rana as Anurita Deol: Nikhil's sister; Param and Karan's love interest (2021)
- Aryan Arora as Gagandeep "Gagan" Jamwal: Seher's best friend (2021)
- Sanjay Mangnani as Bobby Verma: Harshdeep's employee; Dimple's husband (2021)
- Heena Soni as Dimple "Dimpy" Verma: Harshdeep's employee; Bobby's wife (2021)
- Piya Valecha as Dr. Gayatri Sahni: Seher and Rajveer's doctor (2021)
- Puja Sharma as Nimrat "Nimmi" Bhullar: Seher's friend (2021)
- Arpita Pandey as Sukhpreet "Sukhi" Kaur Grewal: Nimrat's friend (2021)
- Dimple Bagroy as Gillori: The lady who mistreated orphanage kids (2021)
- Ayesha Singh as Malani Gandhi: Air hostess (2021)
- Shefali Rana as Shekhar Kaul's mother (2021)
- Abhishek Rawat as Shekhar Ram Kaul: Meher and Seher's landlord in Kashmir (2021)
- Shivangi Verma as Samaira Sethi: Sarab's colleague (2021)
- Ramnitu Chaudhery as Saloni Majumdar: Sarab's college friend (2021)
- Ram Yashvardhan as Police Inspector Rajan Chautala: Sandhya's enemy who framed Meher (2021)
- Kratika Sengar as Sandhya Shastri: Meher's friend; Sameer's wife; Paramjeet, Karanjeet and Seher's guardian (2021)
- Ankit Gera as Sameer Shastri: Sandhya's husband (2021)
- Tabrez Khan as Pratap: Sandhya's brother (2021)
- Unknown as Nirvair's father (2022)
- Arjun Singh Shekhawat as Avinash Gupta: Khushi's best friend and lover; Prince's father (2022)
- Rutuja Sawant as Devika/Malaika: Param's ex-fiancée (2022)
- Alika Nair/Anjali Gupta as Harnoor Sandhu: Baljit's former lover; Mannat's mother (2022) (Dead)
- Jassi Kapoor as Inspector Gunwant "GST" Singh Tawde: Mannat's friend (2022)
- Rishikesh Ingley as Akhil Arora: Zorawar's manager (2022)
- Irina Rudakova as Scarlet: Zorawar's ex-fiancée (2022)
- Unknown as Kavita Rajput: Blood donor (2022)
- Unknown as Kavita's husband (2022)
- Sudesh Berry as Guruji (2022)
- Unknown as Pushpa Rathore: Jaswant's wife; Ajit's mother; Devika's fake mother (2022)
- Ajay Dutt as Jaswant Rathore: Pushpa's husband; Ajit's father; Devika's fake father (2022)
- Shubh Karaan as Ajit Rathore: Pushpa and Jaswant's son; Devika's fake brother (2022)

=== Guests ===
- Devoleena Bhattacharjee in a dance performance at Sarab and Meher's sangeet (2019)
- Meera Deosthale as Vidya Singh from Vidya (2019)
- Namish Taneja as Vivek Singh from Vidya (2019)
- Salman Khan to promote Dabangg 3 (2019)
- Sonakshi Sinha to promote Dabangg 3 (2019)
- Sai Manjrekar to promote Dabangg 3 (2019)
- Arjit Taneja as Azaan Mirza from Bahu Begum (2019)
- Samiksha Jaiswal as Noor Mirza from Bahu Begum (2019)
- Taapsee Pannu to promote Thappad (2020)
- Riya Shukla as Lavanya "Pinky" Kashyap from Naati Pinky Ki Lambi Love Story (2020)
- Helly Shah as Riddhima Raisinghania from Ishq Mein Marjawan 2 (2020)
- Amardeep Garg as Ganja Paaji from Radhe Krishna (2020)
- Isha Malviya as Jasmine Sandhu from Udaariyaan (2021)
- Priyanka Chahar Choudhary as Tejo Sandhu from Udaariyaan (2021)
- Ankit Gupta as Fateh Singh Virk from Udaariyaan (2021)

== Production ==
=== Development ===
Based in Amritsar, Punjab, the series is mainly filmed in Mumbai. In November 2019, the honeymoon sequence was filmed in Serbia.

On 12 September 2019, the filming was held for three hours due to the fight by the workers’ union and Allied Mazdoor Union with producers owing to due in payments.

=== Casting ===
In February 2021, the show took a 5 years leap and female child artist Kevina Tak, who played as Param, roped to play as Meher and Sarab's daughter, Seher. Child artists Aekam Binjwe, Gaurika Sharma and Dhan Tejas entered to play as Param, Karan and Yuvi after leap.

In July 2021, it was announced that the show would take a leap of 16 years and Nimrit Kaur Ahluwalia will play the role of her daughter Seher. It was officially confirmed with the release of the promo showing the 16 year leap with new characters Mahir Pandhi and Varun Toorkey, whereas the exit of Avinesh Rekhi, Anita Raj and other supporting actors. Actors Shehzada Dhami and Adhik Mehta roped to play as adult Param and Karan. However, Anita Raj and Mansi Sharma returned as Kulwant Kaur and Harleen Gill in late 2021 and then few more supporting actors came back in January/February 2022.

In December 2021, Shehzada Dhami quit the show and Vineet Raina replaces him. In February 2022, Raina too quit and was replaced by Hitanshu Jinsi.

In March 2022, it was announced that Nimrit Ahluwalia is leaving the show due to her health issues and Mahir Pandhi is leaving too. Amandeep Sidhu announced to play the role of Mannat Kaur and Dishank Arora, Salman Shaikh was approached to play Zoravar Singh, new male lead of the show, but Gaurav S Bajaj replaced them. In late March 2022, it was announced that Hitanshu Jinsi is quitting the show.

=== Filming ===
The production and airing of the show was halted indefinitely in late March 2020 due to the coronavirus outbreak. The filming resumed after three months and the show started airing again on 13 July 2020. During the break, the main actors Rekhi, Ahluwalia and Tak shot a few episodes from their homes during the nationwide lockdown which streamed under Lockdown Special Episodes on Colors TV's official digital platform Voot.

The production was halted for few days from 1 September 2020 after Krishna Soni tested positive for coronavirus.

=== Cancellation ===
In early May 2022, it was announced that Choti Sarrdaarni will telecast its last episode on 27 May 2022 but it didn't. Then on 10 June 2022, it telecasted its last episode.

== Reception ==
=== Critical response ===
The initial promo based on Gurudwara background of the series created disappointment between the Sikhs and a complaint protesting it was written to the channel by All India Sikh Students Federation as they considered some portrayal hurting their sentiments.

=== Ratings ===
In week 41 of 2020, it became the fourth most watched Hindi show in urban with 5.281 million impressions.

== Adaptations ==
Language	Title	Original release	Network(s)	Last aired	Notes
Tamil	Uyire உயிரே	2 January 2020	Colors Tamil	27 March 2021	Remake
Kannada	Hoo Male ಹೂಮಳೆ	16 November 2020	Colors Kannada	16 October 2021	Remake

== Crossover ==
In December 2019, Choti Sarrdaarni and Vidya had a crossover while Salman Khan, Sonakshi Sinha and Sai Manjrekar appeared to promote their upcoming film Dabangg 3.
