= Dhaakad Beera =

Indian family drama television series

- Genre: Family drama
- Created by: Yash A Patnaik
- Starring: Gaurav S Bajaj; Nikki Sharma; Neha Rana; Arav Chowdharry; Pankhuri Awasthy
- Country of origin: India
- Original language: Hindi
- No. of seasons: 1
- No. of episodes: 107

Production
- Producers: Yash A Patnaik; Mamta Patnaik
- Camera setup: Multi-camera
- Running time: 20–25 minutes
- Production companies: Beyond Dreams Entertainment; Inspire Films Private Limited

Original release
- Network: Colors TV
- Release: 24 July – 14 November 2025

Dhaakad Beera was an Indian Hindi-language television family drama series that premiered on Colors TV on 24 July 2025 to 14 November 2025. It was produced by Yash A Patnaik under Beyond Dreams Entertainment and Inspire Films Private Limited. It starred Gaurav S Bajaj, Nikki Sharma, Neha Rana and Arav Chowdharry.

== Plot ==
In Sundar Nagar, Haryana, young Samrat Chaudhary lives under the strict rule of his grandmother Bhanwari Devi, a feared and stubborn matriarch. His mother Sarla had secretly married Vikram, a man from outside their caste, hiding the relationship due to Bhanwari’s rigid traditions. When Sarla became pregnant with her second child, Bhanwari saw it as dishonor to the family.

Sarla dies shortly after her newborn Kishmish. Before her death, she makes Samrat promise to protect his baby sister at all costs. Bhanwari tries to remove Kishmish from the family, but Samrat steps into the role of both mother and father, caring for her in every way.

Their bond deepens as they face constant hostility. One of the most emotional moments comes when Kishmish suffers a severe ear infection. The family ignores her pain, but Samrat risks punishment to get her treated. With the quiet help of his teacher Bela, he finds medicine and nurses her to health, proving his courage and dedication. Samrat’s defiance and growing bravery begin to attract attention in the village.

=== 5 years later ===
Samrat is a teenager and continues to be Kishmish’s main protector. Kishmish, now a young child, has grown attached to him but begins showing rude and spoiled behavior. This change worries Samrat, as he never taught her such things.

Meanwhile, Bhanwari Devi shifts her tactics. Instead of openly targeting Kishmish, she uses the girl as a bridge to reduce the bitterness between herself and Samrat. A key turning point comes when Kishmish is finally allowed to attend school. Earlier Bhanwari had opposed her education, but she now agrees only because she wants Samrat to feel grateful and to grow closer to her. Kishmish enjoys the new privilege and this makes her even more drawn toward Bhanwari’s influence, worrying Samrat further.

At this stage, due to Bhanwari Devi's plan, Vikram returns. He insists to take Kishmish back, but Samrat denies it. However, after much consequences, Samrat agrees. He believes that Kishmish would have a better life with Vikram in Mumbai. He sends her with Vikram. Soon, Samrat creates hatred of himself in Kishmish's heart. Kishmish starts hating Samrat and Samrat leaves, with Kishmish being with Vikram and his wife, Khushboo, and their daughter, Aarohi.

=== 14 years later (Chapter 2) ===
Samrat has grown up in Sundar Nagar and Kishmish has grown up in Mumbai. Samrat grows up being the protector of all the girls and women in his village, while Kishmish grows up being a fashion influencer and hating Samrat. Samrat also opens his own clinic, which is only for the females in his village. He believes that if all the women in his village are protected, Kishmish would return.

Samrat goes to Mumbai because Kishmish was kidnapped. He eventually saves Kishmish, and Kishmish's hatred for Samrat is finally resolved. Samrat takes Kishmish back to Sundar Nagar, but the villagers kidnap her. Samrat saves her by promising the Sarpanch that he would marry his daughter, Karishma, who secretly had an affair. Samrat forcefully marries Karishma, who the starts hating him. Eventually, Samrat's sweet side is revealed, and Karishma's hatred for Samrat is resolved. She soon starts falling for him and doing things that would make him happy. However, she starts hating Kishmish since she believes that Kishmish is disrupting Samrat and Karishma's relationship.

Kishmish, on the other hand, is admitted to a fashion college in Bangalore. However, she decides to go one month early to stop interrupting Samrat and Karishma's relationship. Samrat eventually learns of this and stops Kishmish from going. A few days later, Kishmish meets Dushyant, who is Karishma's uncle.

Soon, Samrat and Karishma are involved in a car accident, in which Dushyant's fiancée dies. Dushyant's family blame Samrat, and in return, they insist Kishmish to marry Dushyant. Kishmish disagrees since Dushyant is double her age, but she eventually agrees to save Samrat's life and save him from imprisonment. Samrat fails to stop the marriage.

After the marriage, Dushyant starts mistreating Kishmish. He also reveals that his first wife, Bhawna, shared the same face as Kishmish. He also reveals that he murdered Bhawna by putting her in fire. Samrat soon learns the truth about Dushyant and confronts him. He also blames Karishma for this, and it is revealed that Karishma gave this idea of Kishmish marrying Dushyant. Samrat, after learning of this, confronts Dushyant and Karishma.

A few days later, it is revealed that the woman who was Dushyant's fiancée and was killed by Samrat and Karishma's car accident was murdered by Brijpal. Brijpal planned this murder and Manveer helped him. After learning the truth, Karishma ends her relationship with Brijpal and Dushyant. Meanwhile, Samrat calls the police and arrests Dushyant and Brijpal, and their mother Girija, for murder. Kishmish also gets a divorce from Dushyant. Finally, Samrat, Karishma, and Kishmish pray and Samrat gives a surprise to Kishmish by giving her the admission letter of fashion college. The show ends with Samrat, Kishmish, and Karishma hugging each other and reuniting.

== Cast ==
=== Main ===
- Gaurav S Bajaj as Samrat Chaudhary; Mr. Chaudhary and Sarla's son; Vikram's step-son; Kishmish's half-brother; Karishma's husband
  - Divyam Shukla as child Samrat
- Nikki Sharma as Kishmish Chaudhary: Vikram and Sarla's daughter; Khushboo's step-daughter; Samrat and Aarohi's half-sister; Dushyant's ex-wife
  - Rivanshi Thakur as child Kishmish
  - Divit Shah as baby Kishmish
- Neha Rana as Karishma Chaudhary: Brijpal's daughter; Samrat's wife
- Arav Chowdharry as Dushyant: Girija's son: Brijpal's younger brother; Bhawna's widower; Kishmish's ex-husband

=== Recurring ===
- Rakshanda Khan as Bhanwari Devi Chaudhary: Matriarch of Chaudhary family; Mr. Chaudhary's mother; Samrat's grandmother; Sarla's murderer
- Ajay Kumar Nain as Ratan Chaudhary: Sushila and Champa's husband; Manveer's father
- Shweta Munshi as Sushila Chaudhary: Ratan's first wife; Manveer's step-mother
- Reema Worah as Champa Chaudhary: Ratan's second wife; Manveer's mother
- Aryan Arora as Manveer Chaudhary: Ratan and Champa's son; Sushila's step-son
  - Viren Gangwaji as child Manveer
- Pankhuri Awasthy as Sarla Beniwal: Mr. Chaudhary's widow; Vikram's first wife; Samrat and Kishmish's mother
- Karan Sharma as Vikram Beniwal: Sarla's widower; Khushboo's husband; Kishmish and Aarohi's father; Samrat's step-father
- Mamta Rana as Khushboo Beniwal: Vikram's widow; Aarohi's mother; Kishmish's step-mother
- Disha Rajput as Aarohi "Aaru" Beniwal: Vikram and Khushboo's daughter; Kishmish's half-sister
- Dalljiet Kaur as Bela: Samrat's school teacher-turned-lawyer
- Sahil Bhasin as Deepu: Bholi's brother; Samrat and Juhi's friend
  - Rivaan Gajbhiye as child Deepu
- Ishana Singh as Bholi: Deepu's sister; Samrat and Juhi's friend
  - Kessar Kansara / Priyanshi Rai as child Bholi
- Resham Shrivardhan as Dr. Juhi: Samrat, Deepu and Bholi's friend
- Manish Khanna as Brijpal: A Sarpanch; Dushyant's brother, Karishma's father
- Karmveer Choudhary as Sarpanch
- Suraj Kalyankar as Shankar
- Kirti Sualy as Girija: Dushyant's mother
- Linita as Kavya

== Production ==
=== Casting ===
Pankhuri Awasthy was cast as Sarla, Samrat and Kishmish's mother. Karan Sharma was selected to portray Vikram, Samrat and Kishmish's father. Dalljiet Kaur to join the show as Bela.
