= Ankit Gupta =

Indian television actor (born 1988)

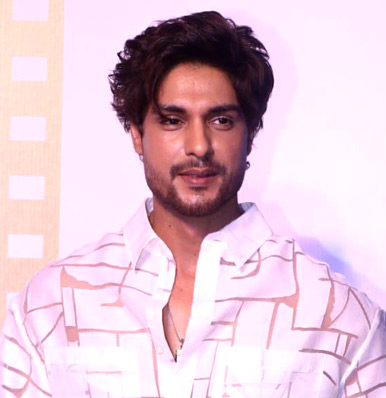
- Gupta in 2024
- Born: 6 November 1988 (age 38); Meerut, Uttar Pradesh, India
- Education: IPEC Engineering College
- Occupations: Actor; model
- Years active: 2012–present
- Notable work: Sadda Haq; Udaariyaan; Bigg Boss; Junooniyatt; Maati Se Bandhi Dor

Ankit Gupta (born 6 November 1988) is an Indian actor and model known for his work in Hindi television. He is best known for his roles in Sadda Haq, Begusarai, Udaariyaan, Junooniyatt and Maati Se Bandhi Dor. In 2022, he participated in Bigg Boss 16.

== Early life ==
Gupta was born on 6 November 1988 in Meerut, Uttar Pradesh. He completed his education at IPEC Engineering College. He initially worked at a call center and later moved to Mumbai, where he appeared in numerous commercials and music videos before venturing into acting.

== Career ==
Gupta made his acting debut in 2012 as Dr. Abhishek Kumar in Colors TV's Balika Vadhu. That same year, he portrayed Nalender Yadav in the Hindi film Tutiya Dil. In 2014, he gained recognition for his role as Parth Kashyap in Channel V India's show Sadda Haq.

Gupta was seen playing recurring roles in various television shows, including Begusarai as Garv Thakur, Kuch Rang Pyar Ke Aise Bhi as Jatin Roy, Mayavi Maling as Chegu and, Kundali Bhagya as Pawan Malhotra. He has also appeared in several web series such as Illegal - Justice, Out of Order, Bekaboo 2, and Main Hero Boll Raha Hu. He entered Ekta Kapoor's Kundali Bhagya in a cameo role of Pawan Malhotra from September to November 2020, marking his first collaboration with Zee TV.

From 2021 to 2022, Gupta portrayed the male lead, Fateh Singh Virk, in Colors TV's popular drama Udaariyaan. In 2022, he participated in the reality show Bigg Boss 16 on Colors TV and was eliminated on day 84.

From February to November 2023, Gupta portrayed Jahaan Mehta, a musician, in Colors TV's romantic musical drama Junooniyatt.

Since May 2024, he has been starring as Rannvijay in the romantic drama Maati Se Bandhi Dor opposite Rutuja Bagwe on StarPlus.

== Media image ==
In 2026, he was listed in 40 Under 40 by the Indian edition of Variety.

== Filmography ==
=== Films ===
| Year | Title | Role | Ref. |
|---|---|---|---|
| 2012 | Tutiya Dil | Nalender Yadav | |
| 2026 | Tu Hai Meri Kiran | Riyaan Malhotra | |

=== Television ===
| Year | Title | Role | Notes | Ref. |
|---|---|---|---|---|
| 2012–2013 | Balika Vadhu | Dr. Abhishek Kumar | Recurring role | |
| 2013 | Oye Jassie | Rodney Kapoor | | |
| 2014–2016 | Sadda Haq | Parth Kashyap | | |
| 2016 | Begusarai | Garv Priyom Thakur | Recurring role | |
| 2017 | Kuch Rang Pyar Ke Aise Bhi | Jatin Roy | Recurring role | |
| 2018 | Mayavi Maling | Chegu | | |
| 2019 | Laal Ishq | Keshav/Raghav/Surya | Episodes 132/138/180 | |
| 2020–2021 | Kundali Bhagya | Pawan Malhotra | Recurring role | |
| 2021–2022 | Udaariyaan | Fateh Singh Virk | | |
| 2022 | Bigg Boss 16 | Contestant | 14th place | |
| 2023 | Junooniyatt | Jahaan Mehta | | |
| 2024–2025 | Maati Se Bandhi Dor | Rannvijay Rana | | |

=== Web series ===
| Year | Title | Role | Ref. |
|---|---|---|---|
| 2020 | Illegal - Justice, Out of Order | Neeraj Shekhawat | |
| 2021 | Bekaaboo (Season 2) | | |
| 2021 | Mai Hero Boll Raha Hu | Inspector Sachin Kadam | |

=== Music videos ===
| Year | Title | Singer | Ref. |
|---|---|---|---|
| 2021 | Ladeya Na Kar | Deedar Kaur | |
| 2023 | Kuch Itne Haseen | Yasser Desai | |
| 2023 | Baarish Aayi Hai | Rito Riba | |
| 2024 | Baar Baar | Sukhwinder Singh, Renuka Panwar | |

== Awards and nominations ==
| Year | Award | Category | Work | Result | Ref. |
|---|---|---|---|---|---|
| 2023 | Indian Telly Awards | Fan Favourite Actor | Udaariyaan | Nominated | |
| 2023 | Indian Telly Awards | Fan Favourite Jodi (with Priyanka Chahar Choudhary) | Udaariyaan | Nominated | |
| 2024 | Pinkvilla Screen and Style Icons Awards | Most Stylish TV Couple (with Priyanka Chahar Choudhary) | —N/a | Won | |

== See also ==
- List of Indian actors
- List of Indian television actors
