= Juhi Mui =

Indian legal drama television series

- Genre: Legal drama
- Created by: Goldie Behl
- Inspired by: Extraordinary Attorney Woo by Moon Ji-won
- Directed by: Aniruddha Rajderkar
- Creative director: Dhruv R Jain
- Starring: Eisha Singh; Vijayendra Kumeria
- Opening theme: "Juhi mui Juhi..."
- Country of origin: India
- Original language: Hindi
- No. of seasons: 1
- No. of episodes: 85

Production
- Producer: Goldie Behl
- Camera setup: Multi-camera
- Running time: 20 minutes
- Production company: Rose Audio Visuals

Original release
- Network: Colors TV
- Release: 29 June – 9 October 2026

Juhi Mui is an Indian Hindi-language courtroom romantic drama television series that premiered on 29 June 2026 on Colors TV and streams digitally on JioHotstar. Produced by Goldie Behl under Rose Audio Visuals Ltd, the series stars Eisha Singh and Vijayendra Kumeria. The series is a loose adaptation of K-drama, Extraordinary Attorney Woo. As a planned finite series, the show completed its run on 9 October 2026 after airing 85 episodes.

== Plot ==
Juhi Suri, a young woman with an exceptional memory and a strong understanding of legal concepts. Despite her abilities, she faces challenges as people around her struggle to understand her condition and often judge her for being different.

Juhi grows up in a family of lawyers and develops an interest in the legal profession while observing her father, Rajendra Suri, who runs his own law practice. Her ability to remember legal sections and notice details helps her navigate cases and situations around her.

== Cast ==
=== Main ===
- Eisha Singh as Advocate Juhi Suri: Rajendra's daughter; Suchitra's step-daughter; Karan's half-sister; Sanyam's love interest (2026)
  - Ritvi Maru as young Juhi (2026)
- Vijayendra Kumeria as Inspector Sanyam Singh: Deshraj and Ahilya's son; Mukul's younger brother; Juhi's love interest (2026)

=== Recurring ===
- Sanjay Suri as Advocate Rajendra Suri: Uttam's brother; Suchitra's husband; Juhi and Karan's father (2026) (Dead)
- Sai Deodhar as Suchitra Rajendra Suri: Rajendra's widow; Karan's mother; Juhi's step-mother (2026)
- Krushag Ghuge as Advocate Karan Suri: Rajendra and Suchitra's son; Juhi's half-brother (2026)
  - Shravya Dhamija as young Karan (2026)
- Shivani Sopori as Suchitra's mother; Karan's grandmother; Juhi's step grandmother (2026)
- Ayub Khan as Advocate Uttam Suri: Rajendra's brother; Minu's husband; Sonya and Tanya's father (2026)
- Anjali Gupta as Minu Suri: Uttam's wife; Sonya and Tanya's mother (2026)
- Aastha Anand as Tanya Suri: Uttam and Minu's daughter (2026)
- Archika Arora as Sonya Suri: Uttam and Minu's daughter (2026)
- Sai Ballal as Deshraj Ahlawat: Ahilya's widower; Mukul and Sanyam's father (2026)
- Amit Dolawat as Mukul Ahlawat: Deshraj and Ahilya's elder son; Sanyam's elder brother; Pankhuri's husband (2026)
- Garima Jain as Pankhuri Ahlawat: Mukul's wife (2026)
- Naveen Nishad as Parmeet Pant aka Pant Kabir: A constable, Sanyam's good friend (2026)
- Kanchan Dubey as Advocate Priya: A lawyer who works under Rajendra Suri and later Uttam Suri; Karan's love interest (2026)
- Nakul Ujla as Advocate Vedang: A lawyer who works under Rajendra Suri and later Uttam Suri; Juhi's one-sided lover (2026)
- Manish Khanna as Advocate Raichand (2026)
- Bhakti Chauhan as Advocate Jigna Patel (2026)
- Ankur Jain as Dr. Ravi Lal: a doctor who made the false autopsy report of Rajendra
- Rakesh Jaiswal as Chor-ji (2026)
- Rahul Ojha as Dinesh Kumar: driver of Yatri Travels, a goon working under Mukul Ahlawat
- Ashrut Jain as Manoj Gupta: CEO of Janki Garments (2026)
- Manasvi Vyaas as Pammi: an ex- employee of Janki Garments (2026)
- Baljeet Kaur as Sweety: an ex-employee of Janki Garments (2026)
- Avni Sonthalia as Shalu: an ex-employee of Janki Garments (2026)

== Production ==
=== Release ===
The promo featuring Eisha Singh as an autistic girl, released on May 2026. The series was released on 29 June 2026 replacing Mangal Lakshmi in its timeslot. The production of the series wrapped up on 9 September. After just four months on air, the series is scheduled to go off air in October 2026.

=== Casting ===
Vijayendra Kumeria was signed for the role of Inspector Sanyam Singh.
