= Udaariyaan =

Indian drama television series (2021-2024)

- Genre: Drama; Romance
- Created by: Sargun Mehta; Ravi Dubey
- Developed by: Sargun Mehta; Ravi Dubey
- Screenplay by: Ritu Goyal; Rachel Navarre; Dialogues; Rajesh Chawla
- Story by: Mitali Bhattacharya; Romit Ojha
- Directed by: Uttam Ahlawat
- Creative director: Ankur Bhatia
- Starring: Priyanka Chahar Choudhary; Isha Malviya; Ankit Gupta; Twinkle Arora; Hitesh Bharadwaj; Aditi Bhagat; Anuraj Chahal; Alisha Parveen; Avinesh Rekhi
- Theme music composer: Shubham Rangra; Kevin; Rajiv Bhatt; Ripul Sharma; George Joseph; Singer; Shubham Rangra; Gurnam Bhullar; Label; Diamond Star Worldwide; Desi Beats; Soundtrack; Udaariyan by Shubham Rangra
- Composers: Diamond Star Worldwide; Shubham Rangra; Debojyoti Mishra; Raja Narayan Deb; Indrashish-Arunashish
- Country of origin: India
- Original language: Hindi
- No. of seasons: 4
- No. of episodes: 1121

Production
- Executive producer: Ali Hasan
- Producers: Ravi Dubey; Sargun Mehta
- Cinematography: Raju Gauli
- Editors: Dharmesh Patel; Kamal
- Camera setup: Multi-camera
- Running time: 21–23 minutes
- Production companies: Dreamiyata Entertainment Pvt. Ltd. & Devirosh Films

Original release
- Network: Colors TV
- Release: 15 March 2021 – 24 July 2024

Udaariyaan (transl. Flight of Dreams) is an Indian Hindi-language television romantic drama series. It aired from 15 March 2021 to 24 July 2024 on Colors TV and streams on JioCinema. Produced by Sargun Mehta and Ravi Dubey, this show is the seventh longest running television shows of Colors TV. It starred Priyanka Chahar Choudhary, Isha Malviya, Ankit Gupta, Twinkle Arora, Hitesh Bharadwaj, Aditi Bhagat, Anuraj Chahal, Alisha Parveen, Avinesh Rekhi, and Shreya Jain over four generations.

== Plot ==
Jasmine and Tejo Sandhu are sisters from Moga. While Jasmine dreams of settling in Canada, Tejo wants to remain in Punjab. Fateh Singh Virk is a boxer who is in love with Jasmine. They pursue a relationship but Jasmine refuses to marry Fateh when she learns that he has lost his job. Tejo and Fateh marry to save the family's reputation. Fateh does not want to move on and continues to romance Jasmine.

Tejo is heartbroken when she discovers the truth. When Fateh and Tejo start falling for each other, Jasmine plots against them. She marries Fateh's brother, Amrik, by mistake. However, due to Amrik's love and care for her, Jasmine also falls for him. Tejo's former fiancé, Angad, sets Tejo on fire and everyone presumes her to be dead.

During their trip to London, Jasmine and Amrik meet Tejo's lookalike, Tanya, who is assigned to investigate Tejo's murder. Amrik dies while saving Tanya from Angad, who is later jailed for his crimes. Jasmine is revealed to be pregnant. Tanya finds Tejo and reunites her with Fateh. Jasmine miscarries but leaves an orphan at the hospital, claiming it to be her and Amrik's child. Tejo and Fateh learn the truth but raise the girl, naming her Nehmat. Jasmine moves to Canada and marries Yash.

Jasmine returns to India with her daughter Naaz after suffering domestic violence at the hands of Yash and his mother. Nehmat learns she is adopted, but believes that she is Jasmine and Amrik's daughter. Jasmine leaves Naaz with the Sandhus. Nehmat and Naaz bond with one another. Tejo, Fateh and the Virks die in a car accident.

Nehmat and Naaz are raised by the Sandhus. Nehmat is in love with Ekam, a trainee IPS officer. Meanwhile, Naaz suffers from an inferiority complex due to all the attention Nehmat receives. Naaz pressures Nehmat to marry Advait Kapoor so she can marry his younger brother, Nikhil Kapoor. Jasmine returns and it is revealed that Jasmine and Advait's father were behind the accident that killed Tejo, Fateh and the Virks. Nehmat's marriage to Advait is nullified as Jasmine's daughter, Harleen, is revealed to be Advait's legal wife. Advait tries to kill Harleen but is jailed. Harleen falls for Ekam. Ekam and Nehmat decide to marry but she backs out after being blackmailed by Jasmine. Ekam and Harleen then marry.

Nehmat realises that she is pregnant with Ekam's child. She gives birth to a daughter, but Harleen kidnaps her. Nehmat is told that her child was born dead while Harleen and Ekam name the child Aliya.

Aliya meets Nehmat at a summer camp and they bond. Eventually, Ekam and Nehmat discover the truth and confront Harleen. Nehmat tells Ekam and Harleen's marriage is null and void, as Ekam and Nehmat got already married in Gurudwara, before Jasmine plotted to separate then to get Ekam and Harleen marry. Jasmine and Harleen decide to plot an accident for Nehmat in which Harleen is presumed to be dead. Nehmat finds evidence against Jasmine and get her jailed.

Ekam forcefully marries Nehmat and eventually both again fall in love with each other but Harleen returns and plots against the two. Nehmat and Ekam deport her back to Canada after finding out the truth. On seeing this, Aliya begins to hate Nehmat and Ekam. Harleen is revealed to be pregnant with Ekam's child through IVF.

A grown up Aliya wants to go to Canada to meet Harleen. She is in love with Armaan. Harleen is now married to Deepak Dhillon and her daughter with Ekam, Asma, returns to India. She keeps meeting Armaan and their marriage is fixed. The two marry unwillingly. Aliya grows jealous and vengeful. Asma and Armaan start to fall for each other, but the former discovers his relationship with Aliya. Aasma is hurt but agrees to divorce Armaan. Armaan ends his relationship with Aliya and reveals his feelings for Asma. Aliya marries Raja but continues to plot.

Aliya tries to murder Asma, but Asma ends up in an enemy country instead. Believing that she is dead, Armaan marries Aliya, who is pregnant with Raja's child. Armaan saves Asma and brings her back to India. Armaan and Aasma adopt Zaid while Aliya gives birth to a daughter, Khushi. Asma is revealed to be pregnant and Aliya hires goons to get rid of her, which leads to Aasma going into early labor. She gives birth to twin girls but is made to believe that one of her daughters died during birth. The goons throw the girl in the river, but she is saved by Armaan.

Asma is living with her daughter, Haniya, and Zaid. Armaan is raising Meher, unaware that she is his and Asma's daughter. Aliya wants to eliminate Meher to get Armaan. Armaan and Asma come face to face and Aliya is exposed and arrested. The police jeep has an accident and Aliya becomes paralyzed. After the accident, Aliya turns over a new leaf and apologizes to Asma for her misdeeds.

Ranvijay Singh, aka Rockstar RV, is introduced. Aliya and RV fall in love, but Aliya remains faithful to Raja. In a twist of events, RV turns out to be Sukhi's illegitimate son. Sukhi promises to have Aliya and RV marry as Raja is mentally unstable. However, Asma stops the wedding, and RV leaves the Gill house. Aliya turns negative again and tortures Aasma. She kidnaps Haniya and Meher, but Asma rescues them. It becomes known that Meher is Armaan and Asma's daughter. In a last-ditch effort, Aliya tries to kill Asma but ends up falling to her death.

Meher and Haniya have grown up to be opposites. Meher is disillusioned by love because she believes that Armaan faked his love for Aasma and left them all. Haniya has fallen for Sarab, but Sarab sees Meher as his ideal type. However, due to Meher's rude behavior, he clashes with her.

Haniya tries to talk to Meher and Aasma about her love but is unable to. Asma decides to have Meher and Sarab marry as she thinks only Sarab can handle Meher's attitude. After many misunderstandings, Meher finally accepts to marry Sarab, and Sarab also confesses his love. Meher also eventually confesses her love. Munni, who was insulted by Meher in front of everyone, tries to turn Meher against Haniya. Haniya confesses to Meher that she used to love Sarab, which divides the sisters.

Meher decides to have Haniya marry Vikram to make sure she stays away from Sarab. Vikram is revealed to be Shakti's younger brother who wants to retaliate against Meher and Haniya. Vikram and Shakti's truth is revealed on the wedding day and the two sisters reunite. However, Munni has Meher kidnapped and pretends that Meher fled from her wedding. Haniya is forced to marry Sarab for her family's honor.

Meher begins to despise Haniya and believes Haniya plotted everything to get Sarab. Meher fixates on reuniting with Sarab and threatens suicide if Sarab doesn't divorce Haniya. Haniya realises Munni is in cahoots with Shakti and decides to expose her. However, Munni outsmarts Haniya and blames everything on her. Haniya begs Meher to trust her, so Meher gives her a chance to prove her innocence. Once Munni's truth is exposed to Meher as well, the sisters join hands to expose Munni.

Munni's truth is exposed in front of everyone and Haniya is proven innocent. Munni is forgiven after she realizes the wrongs of her ways. Meher, realizing that Haniya's love for her and Sarab is pure and selfless, accepts Sarab and Haniya's marriage. Then the family reunites.

== Cast ==
=== Main ===
- Priyanka Chahar Choudhary as
  - Tejo Sandhu Virk: Rupinder and Satti's daughter; Fateh's wife; Nehmat's mother; Aliya's grandmother; Khushi's great-grandmother (2021–2022)
  - Tanya Gill: Tejo's look-alike (2022)
- Ankit Gupta as Fateh Singh Virk: Khushbeer and Gurpreet's son; Tejo's husband; Nehmat's father; Aliya's grandfather; Khushi's great-grandfather (2021–2022)
- Isha Malviya as
  - Jasmine Sandhu Ahluwalia: Satti and Rupinder's daughter; Tejo and Dilraj's sister; Fateh's ex-fiancée; Amrik's widow; Yash's ex-wife; Mr. Ahluwalia's wife; Naaz and Harleen's mother (2021–2023)
  - Harleen Ahluwalia Dhillon: Jasmine and Mr. Ahluwalia's daughter; Naaz's half-sister; Advait ex-wife; Deepak's wife; Aasma's mother (2022–2023)
    - Rashika Matharu as Older Harleen (2023)
- Twinkle Arora as Nehmat Virk Randhawa: Fateh and Tejo's daughter; Ekampreet's wife; Aliya's mother; Khushi's grandmother (2022–2023)
  - Kimmy Kaur as Older Nehmat (2023)
    - Kevina Tak as child Nehmat (2022)
- Hitesh Bharadwaj as Ekampreet "Ekam" Singh Randhawa: Jayveer and Renuka's son; Nehmat's husband; Aliya and Aasma's father; Khushi, Meher and Haniya's grandfather (2022–2023)
  - Sunny Arora as Older Ekampreet (2023)
    - Saksham Kalia as child Ekampreet (2022)
- Alisha Parveen as Aliya Randhawa Gill: Ekampreet and Nehmat's daughter; Raja's wife; Khushi's mother (2023–2024)
  - Ananya Gambhir as child Aliya (2023)
- Aditi Bhagat as
  - Asma Randhawa Gill: Ekampreet and Harleen's daughter; Armaan's wife; Haniya and Meher's mother (2023–2024)
    - Simran Khanna as Older Aasma (2024)
  - Haniya Gill Aulakh: Armaan and Asma's daughter; Sarabjeet's wife (2024)
    - Raaghvi as child Haniya (2024)
- Anuraj Chahal as Armaan Singh Gill: Sukhwinder and Rano's son; Aasma's husband; Meher and Haniya's father (2023–2024)
- Avinesh Rekhi as Sarabjeet "Sarab" Singh Aulakh: Bubbly's son; Munni's stepson; Haniya's husband (2024)
- Shreya Jain as Meher Gill: Asma and Armaan's daughter; Haniya's twin sister; Zaid's adopted sister; Sarab's ex-fianceé (2024)
  - Prisha Gupta Aneja as child Meher (2024)

=== Recurring ===
==== Sandhus ====
- Mohinder Gujral as Sukhmini Kaur Sandhu: Harman and Rupinder's mother; Tejo, Jasmine, Abhiraj, Navraj and Dilraj's grandmother (2021–2023)
- Sukhpal Singh as Harman Singh Sandhu: Sukhmini's elder son; Rupi's brother; Lovely's husband; Abhiraj and Navraj's father (2021–2023)
- Amrit Chahal as Lovely Kaur Sandhu: Harman's wife; Abhiraj and Navraj's mother (2021–2023)
- Abhiraaj Chawla / Aman Jaiswal / Tushar Dhembla / Love Sandhu as Abhiraj Singh Sandhu: Lovely and Harman's elder son; Navraj's brother; Shelly's husband (2021–2023)
- Nandini Tiwari as Shelly Kaur Sandhu: Abhiraj's wife (2022)
- Preet Rajput as Navraj Singh Sandhu: Lovely and Harman's younger son; Abhiraj's brother (2021)
- Raman Dhagga as Rupinder "Rupi" Singh Sandhu: Sukhmini's younger son; Harman's brother; Satti's husband; Tejo, Jasmine and Dilraj's father (2021–2024)
- Kamal Dadiala as Satti Kaur Sandhu: Rupinder's wife; Tejo, Jasmine and Dilraj's mother; Naaz and Harleen's grandmother; Nehmat's adoptive grandmother (2021–2023)
- Tavish Gupta as Dilraj Singh Sandhu: Satti and Rupinder's son; Tejo and Jasmine's brother (2021)

==== Virks ====
- Ranjit Riaz Sharma as Bauji: Beeji's husband; Khushbeer, Balbir and Pammi's father; Simran, Fateh, Amrik and Mahi's grandfather (2021–2022)
- Jaswant Daman as Beeji: Bauji's wife; Khushbeer, Balbir and Pammi's mother; Simran, Fateh, Amrik and Mahi's grandmother (2021–2022)
- Ram Aujla as Khushbeer Singh Virk: Beeji and Bauji's elder son; Balbir and Pammi's brother; Gurpreet's husband; Simran, Fateh, Amrik and Mahi's father (2021–2022)
- Gurvinder Gauri as Gurpreet Kaur Virk: Nimmo's sister; Khushbeer's wife; Simran, Fateh, Amrik and Mahi's mother (2021–2022)
- Abhishek Kumar as Amrik Singh Virk: Gurpreet and Khushbeer's son; Simran, Fateh and Mahi's brother; Jasmine's first husband (2021–2022)
- Rashmeet Kaur Sethi as Mahi Kaur Virk: Gurpreet and Khushbeer's youngest daughter; Simran, Fateh and Amrik's sister (2021–2022)
- Amandeep Kaur as Nimmo Kaur Virk: Gurpreet's sister; Balbir's wife; Kiran and Ashu's mother (2021–2023)
- Kiran Kaur as Pammi Kaur Virk Bajwa: Beeji and Bauji's daughter; Khushbeer and Balbir's sister; Manjit's wife (2021)
- Pardeep Soni as Manjit Singh Bajwa: Pammi's husband (2021)

==== Janjuas ====
- Virsa Riar as Buzzo Janjua: Fateh's best friend; Simran's husband; Candy's stepfather (2021–2022)
- Chetna Singh as Simran Virk Janjua: Gurpreet and Khushbeer's daughter; Fateh, Amrik and Mahi's sister; Amarpreet's ex-fiancée; Buzzo's wife; Candy's mother (2021–2022)
- Jaivik Wadhwa as Candy Janjua: Simran and Amarpreet's son; Buzzo's stepson (2021–2022)

==== Randhawas ====
- Sukhdev Barnala as SSP Jayveer Randhawa: Balveer's brother; Renuka's husband; Ekampreet and Mallika's father; Aliya and Aasma's grandfather (2022) (Dead)
- Meenu Sharma as Renuka Randhawa: Jayveer's widow; Ekampreet and Mallika's mother; Aliya and Aasma's grandmother (2022–2023)
- Neha Thakur as Mallika Randhawa: Jayveer and Renuka's daughter; Ekam's sister; Nehmat's childhood best friend; Advait's ex-fiancée (2022–2023)
  - Gurbani Kaur Nagi as child Mallika (2022)
- Siddharth Vasudev as Balveer "Balli" Singh Randhawa: Jayveer's brother; Naaz's second husband; Sartaj and Shanky's father; Tiger's grandfather (2023)
- Sonakshi Batra as Naaz Bajwa Randhawa: Jasmine and Yash's daughter; Harleen's half-sister; Nikhil's ex-wife; Balveer's second wife; Sartaj and Shanky's stepmother; Tiger's step-grandmother (2022–2023)
  - Kanishtha Kaushik as child Naaz (2022)
- Vivian Dsena as Dr. Sartaj Randhawa: Balveer's son; Naaz's stepson; Shanky's brother; Nehmat's fake fiancé (2023)
- Avi Rakheja as Shankar "Shanky" Singh Randhawa: Balveer's younger son; Naaz's stepson; Sartaj's brother; Cherry's husband; Tiger's father (2023)
- Loveleen Kaur as Cherry Randhawa: Shanky's wife; Tiger's mother (2023)
- Ruhaan Kapoor as Tiger Randhawa: Shanky and Cherry's son (2023)

==== Kapoors ====
- Manish Khanna as Shamsher Kapoor: Neeru's brother; Rama's husband; Advait and Nikhil's father (2022–2023)
- Kavita Ghai as Rama Kapoor: Shamsher's wife; Advait and Nikhil's mother (2022–2023)
- Rohit Purohit as Advait Kapoor: Shamsher and Rama's elder son; Nikhil's brother; Mallika's ex-fiancé; Harleen and Nehmat's ex-husband (2022–2023)
- Samarth Jurel as Nikhil Kapoor: Shamsher and Rama's younger son; Advait's brother; Naaz's ex-husband (2022–2023)
- Sapna Soni as Neeru Kapoor: Prince's wife; Shamsher's sister (2022–2023)
- Vishal Saini as Prince: Neeru's husband (2022–2023)

==== Gills ====
- Kulveer Kapoor as Mrs. Gill: Sukhwinder, Baby and Hobby's mother; Armaan, Raja, Ranvijay, Kannu and Mannu's grandmother; Khushi, Meher and Haniya's great-grandmother; Zaid's adoptive great-grandmother (2023–2024)
- Hari Aum Kalra as Sukhwinder "Sukhi" Gill: Mrs. Gill's elder son; Hobby and Baby's brother; Rano's husband; Manpreet's ex-lover; Armaan, Raja and Ranvijay's father; Khushi, Meher and Haniya's grandfather; Zaid's adoptive grandfather (2023–2024)
- Neelam Hundal Randhawa as Rano Gill: Sukhwinder's wife; Armaan and Raja's mother; Ranvijay's stepmother; Khushi, Meher and Haniya's grandmother; Zaid's adoptive grandmother (2023–2024)
- Shivansh as Zaid Gill: Murtazim's son; Asma and Armaan's adoptive son; Meher and Haniya's adopted brother (2024)
  - Saumil Chawla as child Zaid Siddiqui (2024)
- Inderjeet as Raja Gill: Sukhwinder and Rano's son; Armaan's brother; Ranvijay's half-brother; Aliya's husband; Khushi's father (2023–2024)
- Kiaara as Khushi Gill: Aliya and Raja's daughter (2024)
- Kunal Karan Kapoor as Ranvijay "RV" Singh: Manpreet and Sukhwinder's son; Rano's stepson; Armaan and Raja's half-brother; Aliya's love interest (2024)
- Mayur Ghai as Hobby Gill: Mrs. Gill's younger son; Sukhwinder and Baby's brother; Neetu's husband; Kannu and Mannu's father (2023–2024)
- Gunabi Maan as Neetu Gill: Hobby's wife; Kannu and Mannu's mother (2023–2024)
- Gyanadda Nalwa as Kannu Gill: Hobby and Neetu's daughter; Mannu's sister; Harjeet’s wife (2023–2024)
- Manseerat as Mannu Gill: Hobby and Neetu's younger daughter; Kannu's sister (2023–2024)
- Surbhi Kaur as Baby Gill: Sukhwinder and Hobby's sister; Deepak's ex-fiancée (2023)

==== Dhillons ====
- Vikas Neb as Deepak Dhillon: Beeji's son; Ashok's brother; Baby's ex-fiancé; Harleen's husband; Aasma's stepfather; Meher and Haniya's step-grandfather; Zaid's adoptive step-grandfather (2023)
- Kuku Diwan as Ashok Dhillon: Beeji's son; Deepak's brother; Preeto's husband; Kiku and Minty's father (2023)
- Poonam Kalra as Preeto Dhillon: Ashok's wife; Kiku and Minty's mother (2023)
- Kiranbir Kaur as Minty Dhillon: Ashok and Preeto's daughter; Kiku's sister; Aasma's step-cousin; Jaggi's love interest (2023)
- Mukul Mehta as Kiku Dhillon: Ashok and Preeto's son; Minty's brother; Silky's husband (2023)
- Preet Raman as Silky Dhillon: Kiku's wife (2023)

==== Aulakhs ====
- Pali Geetan Wala as Bubbly Singh Aulakh: Munni's husband; Sarabjeet, Leo, Lilly and Sally's father (2024)
- Rinku Dhawan as Munni Kaur Aulakh: Bubbly's wife; Sarabjeet's stepmother; Leo, Lilly and Sally's mother (2024)
- Priyanka Saraswat as Lilly Kaur Aulakh: Bubbly and Munni's daughter; Sarabjeet's half-sister; Leo and Sally's sister (2024)
- Sahnoor Kaur as Sally Kaur Aulakh: Bubbly and Munni's daughter; Sarabjeet's half-sister; Leo and Lilly's sister (2024)
- Karan Sharma as Leo Singh Aulakh: Bubbly and Munni's son; Sarab's half-brother; Sally and Lily's brother (2024)

==== Others ====
- Karan V Grover as
  - Angad Maan: Tejo's fake fiancé and obsessive lover; Arjun's brother; Riya's uncle and caretaker (2021–2022)
  - Arjun Maan: Angad's brother; Preet's husband; Riya's father (2021)
- Bhavya Sharma as Riya Maan: Preet and Arjun's daughter (2021–2022)
- Lokesh Batta as Jass Kohli: Tejo's fake husband (2021)
- Pawan Dhiman as Gurpreet and Nimmo's brother (2021)
- Loveneet Kaur as Sweety: Jasmine's best friend (2021–2022)
- Anju Kapoor as Swaroop (2021–2022)
- Mohit Nain as Gippy: Jasmine's ex-fiancé (2021)
- Santosh Malhotra as Mrs. Kohli: Jass's mother (2021)
- Amanpreet Kaur as Preeto: Jasmine's best friend; Neetu's sister (2021)
- Rishabh Mehta as Sandeep: Jasmine's first lover (2021)
- Sourav Jain as Aman: Tejo's student who shot Tejo (2021)
- Jyoti Arora as Canadian officer (2021)
- Mathlub Khan as Mr. Dhillon: Jasmine's assistant; a wedding decorator (2022)
- Unknown as Mrs. Bajwa: Manish and Yash's mother; Naaz's grandmother (2022)
- Manish Tulsiyani as Yash Bajwa: Manish's brother; Jasmine's ex-husband; Naaz's father (2022)
- Vishwas Saraf as Manish Bajwa: Yash's brother; Jasmine's one-sided lover (2022)
- Indresh Malik as Amanpreet Singh Bajwa: Simran's ex-fiancé; Candy's father (2022)
- Malika as Simmi: Haniya's best friend (2024)
- Ramandeep Singh Sur as Jaggi: Armaan and Bunty's best friend; Minty's love interest (2023)
- Ankit Sharma as Bunty: Armaan and Jaggi's best friend (2023)
- Gautam Vig as Jordan (2023)
- Kushagre Dua as Joginder Singh: Sartaj's imposter; Head of a smuggling gang; Ekam and Nehmat's enemy (2023)
- Karan Sharma as Murtazim Siddiqui: Shenaaz's son; Zaid's father (2024) (Dead)
- Seema Kapoor as Sehnaaz Begum Siddiqui: Murtazim's mother; Zaid's grandmother (2024)
- Aditi Rawat as Simmi: Meher's fake mother (2024)

== Production ==
=== Casting ===
Priyanka Chahar Choudhary, Isha Malviya and Ankit Gupta were cast to portray the leads Tejo, Jasmine and Fateh respectively. Post the six month leap, Choudhary also played Tanya. Karan Grover was roped in as the main antagonist and played the dual roles of Angad and Arjun.

In September 2022, the series took a generation leap when Twinkle Arora, Hitesh Bharadwaj and Sonakshi Batra were cast as Nehmat, Ekam and Naaz respectively. Malviya returned in the dual role of an older Jasmine and her daughter Harleen. In April 2023, Rohit Purohit quit the show. In the same month, Kushagre Dua enters the show as Joginder Singh. In late April 2023, Vivian Dsena joined the show as Dr. Sartaj Singh Randhawa. In late June 2023, Sonakshi Batra quit the show. In mid-July 2023, Dsena also quit the show. In August 2023, Arora and Bharadwaj also quit the series.

In August 2023, the series took another generation leap when Aditi Bhagat, Anuraj Chahal and Alisha Parveen Khan were cast as Aasma, Armaan and Aliya respectively. In April 2024, Kunal Karan Kapoor was cast as the parallel lead Ranvijay, opposite Aliya.

In May 2024, the series took another generation leap when Aditi Bhagat, Avinesh Rekhi and Shreya Jain were cast as Haniya, Sarabjeet and Meher respectively.

=== Filming ===
The series has been shot in Chandigarh since its inception. During the six months leap track, the series was shot in London.

=== Release ===
A special song promo was released with Sargun Mehta, Choudhary, Gupta and Isha Malviya alongside rapper Badshah.

== Crossover ==
- Udaariyaan had a crossover with Choti Sarrdaarni from 19 April 2021 to 20 April 2021, where Tejo and Sarab met.
- It hosted a Bollywood themed Diwali bash in November 2021, which was attended by the cast of Colors TV's shows along with Gurpreet Ghuggi, Gippy Grewal and Gurnam Bhullar.

== Awards and nominations ==
Year	Award	Category	Recipient	Result	Ref.
2022	Indian Television Academy Awards	Best Original Story	Sargun Mehta and Ravi Dubey	Won	
2023	Indian Telly Awards	Rising Star: Editorial Choice	Isha Malviya	Won	
2023	Indian Telly Awards	Fan Favourite Negative Lead: Female	Isha Malviya	Nominated	
2023	Indian Telly Awards	Fan Favourite Negative Lead: Male	Karan Grover	Won	
2023	Indian Telly Awards	Fan Favourite Actress	Priyanka Chahar Choudhary	Nominated	
2023	Indian Telly Awards	Fan Favourite Actor	Ankit Gupta	Nominated	
2023	Indian Telly Awards	Fan Favourite Jodi	Priyanka Chahar Choudhary and Ankit Gupta	Nominated	
2023	Indian Telly Awards	Fan Favourite Show	Udaariyaan	Nominated	
2023	Indian Telly Awards	Fan Favourite Director	Uttam Ahlawat	Won	
