= Reality Ranis of the Jungle =

- Promotional release poster
- Genre: Reality television
- Based on: Echte meisjes ...
- Presented by: Varun Sood
- Starring: See below
- Country of origin: India
- Original languages: English; Hindi
- No. of seasons: 2
- No. of episodes: 30

Production
- Running time: 45 mins
- Production company: Warner Bros. Discovery

Original release
- Network: Discovery Channel
- Release: 23 September 2024 – present

Reality Ranis of the Jungle is an Indian reality television series based on the Dutch show Echte meisjes .... Produced under Warner Bros. Discovery and hosted by Varun Sood. It premiered on Discovery Channel on 23 September 2024 and streams digitally on Discovery+.

The second season was announced on 3 September 2025 and is set to premier on 22 September 2025.

== Series overview ==
Season	Contestants	Host	Cash Prize	Episodes	Originally released			Winners	Runners-up
Season	Contestants	Host	Cash Prize	Episodes	First released	Last released	Network	Winners	Runners-up
1	12	Varun Sood	₹20,00,000	10	September 23, 2024	October 22, 2024	Discovery Channel & Discovery+	Eksha Kerung	Arushi Chawla; Krissann Barretto
2	12	Varun Sood	₹15,00,000	20	September 22, 2025	October 17, 2025	Discovery Channel & Discovery+	Irina Rudakova	Archana Gautam; Hiiya Bajwa; Sara Gurpal

== Season 1 ==
=== Contestants ===
Contestants	Age	Known for	Status	Place
Eksha Kerung	24	MTV Supermodel of the Year 2	Winner	1st
Arushi Chawla	30	MTV Roadies: Revolution	Runner-up	2nd
Krissann Barretto	33	Ace of Space 2	Runner-up	2nd
Tejaswi Madivada	33	Bigg Boss Telugu 2	Eliminated	4th
Pavitra Punia	38	Bigg Boss Hindi 14	Eliminated	5th
Jeevika Tyagi	35	Shark Tank India 3	Eliminated	6th
Sifat Sehgal	24	IRL: In Real Love	Quit	7th
Anjali Schmuck	29	MTV Supermodel of the Year 1	Eliminated	8th
Christeena Biju	26	MTV Love School	Eliminated	9th
Bebika Dhurve	31	Bigg Boss OTT Hindi 2	Quit	10th
Mrunal Shankar	28	MTV Hustle 3	Eliminated	11th
Mira Jagannath	26	Bigg Boss Marathi 3	Eliminated	12th

=== Nomination table ===
Team Glam Divas
Team Rebel Ranis
Team Lal Ranis
Team Toofani Ranis

	Week 1	Week 2	Week 3	Week 4	Week 5	Finale Week	
	Episode 1-3	Episode 3-4	Episode 5-6	Episode 7	Episode 8-9	Episode 10	
Team Captains	Pavitra		No Captain		No Captain		
Team Captains	Tejaswi		Krissann		No Captain		
Eksha	Bebika; Mira	Jeevika; Mrunal	Immune	Anjali; Pavitra	Jeevika; Pavitra	Finalist	Winner
Arushi	Bebika; Mira	Jeevika; Mrunal	Immune	Jeevika; Pavitra	Jeevika; Pavitra	Finalist	Runner-up
Krissann	Immune	Bebika; Anjali	Christeena (x2)	Arushi; Anjali	Jeevika; Arushi	Finalist	Runner-up
Tejaswi	Bebika; Mira	Jeevika; Mrunal	Sifat	Anjali; Arushi	Pavitra; Krissann	Semi- Finalist	Eliminated (Episode 10)
Pavitra	Immune	Bebika; Christeena	Immune	Arushi; Jeevika	Arushi; Jeevika	Semi- Finalist	Eliminated (Episode 10)
Jeevika	Bebika; Mira	Mrunal; Eksha	Immune	Arushi; Anjali	Pavitra; Arushi	Eliminated (Episode 9)	
Sifat	Immune	Bebika; Christeena	Tejaswi	Arushi; Pavitra	Quit, due to injury (Episode 8)		
Anjali	Immune	Bebika; Krissann	Immune	Arushi; Jeevika	Eliminated (Episode 7)		
Christeena	Immune	Bebika; Sifat	Tejaswi	Eliminated (Episode 6)			
Bebika	Arushi; Jeevika	Bebika; Christeena	Quit (Episode 5)				
Mrunal	Immune	Jeevika; Arushi	Eliminated (Episode 4)				
Mira	Jeevika; Arushi	Eliminated (Episode 3)					
Nominated for Survival Challenge	Bebika; Mira	~~Bebika~~; Christeena; ~~Jeevika~~; Mrunal	Christeena; Tejaswi	Arushi; Anjali	Jeevika; Pavitra	None	
Eliminated	Mira	Mrunal	Christeena	Anjali	Jeevika	Pavitra	Arushi
Eliminated	Mira	Mrunal	Christeena	Anjali	Jeevika	Pavitra	Krissann
Eliminated	Mira	Mrunal	Christeena	Anjali	Jeevika	Tejaswi	Eksha
Quit	None		Bebika	None	Sifat	None	

The contestant was immune prior to nominations.
The contestant was nominated for elimination.
The contestant was eliminated.
The contestant walked out due to emergency.

=== Prize Pot ===
Teams had to win the money challenges to build their prize pot.

Team	Episode 2	Episode 3	Team	Episode 5		Episode 7		Episode 8	Team	Episode 8	Episode 9-10	Final Prize
Glam Divas	₹3,00,000		Lal Ranis	₹7,00,000	₹2,00,000		₹0	₹6,00,000	Teams; Merged	₹12,00,000	₹20,00,000	₹20,00,000
Rebel Ranis	₹0	₹3,00,000	Toofani Ranis	₹7,00,000	₹7,00,000	₹10,00,000	₹6,00,000		Teams; Merged	₹12,00,000	₹20,00,000	₹20,00,000

=== Episodes ===
No. overall	No. in series	Title	Original release date
1	1	"Meet the Ranis"	23 September 2024
2	2	"Luxury or Lost"	24 September 2024
3	3	"Face-Off in the Jungle"	30 September 2024
4	4	"Laws of the Jungle"	1 October 2024
5	5	"Survival of the Fittest"	7 October 2024
6	6	"Mud Fight"	8 October 2024
7	7	"Win Some, Lose Some"	14 October 2024
8	8	"Race to Camp"	15 October 2024
9	9	"Final Push for Survival"	21 October 2024
10	10	"Survival Rani of the Jungle"	22 October 2024

== Season 2 ==
=== Contestants ===
Contestants	Age	Known for	Status	Place
Irina Rudakova	35	Bigg Boss Marathi 5	Winner	1st
Archana Gautam	31	Bigg Boss Hindi 16	Runner-up	2nd-4th
Hiiya Bajwa	27	MTV Supermodel of the Year 1	Runner-up	2nd-4th
Sara Gurpal	33	Bigg Boss Hindi 14	Runner-up	2nd-4th
Jayshree Roy	25	MTV Supermodel of the Year 2	Walked	5th
Ishu Kashyap	19	Playground 3	Eliminated	6th-7th
Nishu Kashyap	19	Playground 3	Eliminated	6th-7th
Prachi Shevgoankar	27	Climate activist	Eliminated	8th
Bhavya Singh	29	MTV Splitsvilla 12	Eliminated	9th-10th
Samyuktha Hegde	27	MTV Roadies 14	Eliminated	9th-10th
Sasa Salunke	22	MTV Dark Scroll	Eliminated	11th
Scarlett Rose	33	MTV Splitsvilla 7	Eliminated	12th

- Rakhi Sawant was a guest in Episodes 11-15 as Double Trouble Twist.
- Pavitra Punia, finalist from season 1 appeared as Advantage in the final "Race to Camp" challenge in Episodes 18-20.

=== Nomination table ===
	Week 1 (Note: In week 1, Jayshree won immunity challenge and earned immunity for two weeks.)	Week 2 (Note: In week 2, Samyuktha won immunity challenge and received a special power to cancel one contestant's vote. She chose to cancel Prachi's vote.) (Note: In week 2, Ishu and Nishu received two votes and was a tie, their team Captain Hiiya cast a deciding vote. She chose Nishu.)	Week 3 (Note: In week 3, first round of nominations contestants had to nominate one contestant from their team. Then in second round of nominations contestants had to nominate one contestant from the other team.)	Week 4			Final	
	Week 1	Week 2	Week 3	Episode 16-17 (Note: In week 4, Prachi lost the challenge and was eliminated.) (Note: In week 4, Irina won the Ticket to Finale and was safe from elimination.)	Episode 18-19 (Note: In week 4, Ishu and Nishu lost the "Race to Camp" challenge and were eliminated.)	Episode 19-20 (Note: In Episode 20, Jayshree took the temptation to take ₹3,00,000 for personal account and quit the show.)	Episode 20	
Team Captains	Irina	Sara		No Captain				
Team Captains	Samyuktha	Hiiya		No Captain				
Irina	Scarlett; Archana	Ishu	Prachi Archana	Ticket to Finale	Finalist		Winner	
Archana	Scarlett; Prachi	Nishu	Samyuktha Irina	Safe	Finalist		Runner-up	
Hiiya	Bhavya; Nishu	Sasa; Nishu	Bhavya; Bhavya Irina	Safe	Finalist		Runner-up	
Sara	Scarlett; Prachi	Ishu	Prachi Samyuktha	Safe	Finalist		Runner-up	
Jayshree	Bhavya; Ishu	Sasa	Archana Irina	Safe	Finalist	Took ₹3,00,000	Quit (Episode 20)	
Ishu	Bhavya; Scarlett	Sasa	Prachi Samyuktha	Safe	Eliminated	Eliminated (Episode 19)		
Nishu	Bhavya; Scarlett	Sasa	Prachi Samyuktha	Safe	Eliminated	Eliminated (Episode 19)		
Prachi	Nishu; Bhavya	~~Nishu~~	Ishu Jayshree	Eliminated	Eliminated (Episode 17)			
Bhavya	Scarlett; Prachi	Nishu	Samyuktha Irina	Eliminated (Episode 15)				
Samyuktha	Bhavya; Nishu	Sasa	Bhavya Ishu	Eliminated (Episode 15)				
Sasa	Scarlett; Prachi	Irina	Eliminated (Episode 10)					
Scarlett	Bhavya; Nishu	Eliminated (Episode 5)						
Nominated for Survival Challenge	Bhavya; Scarlett	Nishu; Sasa	Bhavya; Irina; Prachi; Samyuktha	None				
Eliminated	Scarlett	Sasa	Bhavya	Prachi	Ishu	None	Hiiya	Archana
Eliminated	Scarlett	Sasa	Samyuktha	Prachi	Nishu	None	Sara	Irina
Quit	None					Jayshree	None	

The contestant was immune prior to nominations.
The contestant was nominated for elimination.
The contestant was eliminated.
The contestant walked out.

=== Prize Pot ===
Teams had to win the money challenges to build their prize pot.

Team	Episode 3	Episode 7	Episode 8	Team	Episode 9	Episode 13	Episode 18	Team	Episode 18	Episode 20	Final Prize
Team Irina	₹50,000	₹3,50,000	₹3,00,000	Team Sara	₹3,50,000	₹5,00,000	₹10,00,000	Teams; Merged	₹11,50,000	₹15,00,000	₹15,00,000
Team Samyuktha	₹0	₹4,00,000	₹2,00,000	Team Hiiya	₹2,00,000	₹1,30,000	₹1,50,000	Teams; Merged	₹11,50,000	₹15,00,000	₹15,00,000

==== Notes ====
- In Episode 7, Jayshree and Prachi fell for temptation in Money Task to take ₹2,00,000 for personal account from the team's winning money. But Jayshree was the first to fall for temptation and took the money.
- In Episode 20, Jayshree took the temptation to take ₹3,00,000 for personal account and quit the show.

=== Episodes ===
No. overall	No. in series	Title	Original release date
11	1	"Sink, Swim, Survive"	22 September 2025
12	2	"Gross Gains"	23 September 2025
13	3	"Luxury or Loyalty"	24 September 2025
14	4	"Jungle Judgements"	25 September 2025
15	5	"Drown the Doubt"	26 September 2025
16	6	"The Money Trap"	29 September 2025
17	7	"Catch or Crash"	30 September 2025
18	8	"Race to Riches (or Ruin)"	1 October 2025
19	9	"Urine or You're Out"	2 October 2025
20	10	"Burn to Stay"	3 October 2025
21	11	"The Karmic Dilemma"	6 October 2025
22	12	"Lucky Breaks and Coconuts"	7 October 2025
23	13	"Coconut Clash"	8 October 2025
24	14	"The Double Nomination"	9 October 2025
25	15	"The Coffin Challenge"	10 October 2025
26	16	"A Twist of Fate"	13 October 2025
27	17	"Final Showdown"	14 October 2025
28	18	"Hunter and Gatherers"	15 October 2025
29	19	"Final Feast"	16 October 2025
30	20	"The Ultimate Reality Rani"	17 October 2025

== Production ==
On 6 September 2024, the series was announced by Warner Bros. Discovery. The first look was released on 5 September 2024.

== Reception ==
Prachi Arya gave the series a three-star rating out of five in her review for India Today.
