= Hongey Judaa Na Hum =

Indian television drama series

- Written by: Vipul Mehta; Vishal Watwani; Renu Watwani; Paushali Ganguli; Priyanka Ghatak; Sharad Tripathi
- Directed by: Irfan Shaikh
- Starring: See below
- Country of origin: India
- Original language: Hindi
- No. of seasons: 1
- No. of episodes: 107

Production
- Producers: Ravi Adhikari; Paritosh Painter
- Cinematography: Amit Singh
- Editor: Prashant Palande
- Running time: 20 minutes
- Production company: Shri Adhikari Brothers

Original release
- Network: Sony Entertainment Television
- Release: 10 September 2012 – 20 March 2013

Hongey Judaa Na Hum (transl. We won't be separated) is an Indian television drama series that premiered on Sony TV on 10 September 2012. The story depicts the tempestuous love story of a young married couple, rediscovering love after meeting with a car crash, erasing their memory. The show stars Raqesh Vashisth and Aamna Sharif in the lead roles and marks the return of Aamna Sharif to television after five years. Hongey Judaa Na Hum ended on 20 March 2013 due to low TRP's.

== Plot ==
Rohan (Raqesh Vashisth) and Muskaan (Aamna Sharif) are a young couple who have been married for five years. They love each other deeply but continuously bicker and fight. However, Muskaan's mother, Tara (Deepshikha), does not like Muskaan's marriage with Rohan as they fight a lot, while Rohan's family loves Muskaan a lot. One day, the two of them meet with a tragic car accident and lose their memory of their past with each other. Dr. Anirudh (Aamir Ali) a good friend and doctor of Muskaan, asks them to stay separate for their own well being. Thus, they start life afresh with their families, separated from each other. A year passes, and life gives Rohan and Muskaan another chance. Rohan has a good friend, Anushka (Pavitra Punia) who is his paying guest, but Rohan ultimately falls for Muskaan, unknowing his past. While Anushka falls for Rohan, circumstances lead Muskaan to marry Anirudh, as Tara wanted, because she was aware of Anirudh's love for Muskaan, but as fate would have it, Rohan gets back his memory and tries to get Muskaan back. Anushka, who is in love with Rohan, tries to do everything she can to separate Rohan and Muskaan, and tries to kill Muskaan. There is a party going on in Duggal's house and Anushka takes advantage of it by sneaking into Tara Duggal's room and takes her gun. She tries to shoot Muskaan. She is afraid of getting caught, so Anushka goes to the hospital and kills Tara. At Tara's funeral, Anirudh reveals the truth about Muskaan being Rohan's wife and they finally get married. Anirudh meets them one final time before leaving for London. Muskaan starts a new life with Rohan. There is a new entry of a lady named Rama (Kishwer Merchant) who is Rohan's paternal cousin Badri's (Manmohan Tiwari) wife. She plans to create tension in the house. The show ends with Muskaan getting kidnapped and while trying to save Muskaan, Rohan and Muskaan die. Rama and Lallan are arrested for their murder. The show ends with Muskaan and Rohan dying together and living in heaven together.

== Cast ==
Character	Portrayed by	Role
Muskaan Rohan Mishra	Aamna Sharif	Rohan's wife
Rohan Mishra	Raqesh Vashisth	Muskaan's husband
Mr. Mishra	Shahab Khan	Rajeev and Rohan's father
Rajeev Mishra	Gaurav Khanna	Rohan's elder brother, Preeti's husband, Chintu's father
Maria	Khushbu Thakkar	Cafe Manager at Muskaan's restaurant
Preeti Rajeev Mishra	Gungun Uprari	Rohan's sister-in-law, Rajeev's wife, Chintu's mother
Chintu Rajiv Mishra	Vishesh Bansal	Rohan's nephew; Preeti and Rajeev's son
Anushka	Pavitra Punia	Mishra house's paying guest and Rohan's friend, Rohan's love
Tara Avinash Duggal	Deepshikha Nagpal	Muskaan Kabir and Rishi's mother, Abhi's wife
Avinash Duggal	Ayub Khan	Muskaan and Rishi's father, Tara's husband
Rishi Duggal	Rehan Sayed	Muskaan's brother, Abhi and Tara's son
Dr. Anirudh Sharma	Aamir Ali	Rohan and Muskaan's doctor and friend, Muskaan's lover and ex-fiancé
Mrs. Sharma	Suhasini Mulay	Dr. Anirrudh's grandmother
Mr. Sharma	Amit Singh Thakur	Dr. Anirrudh's father
Mrs. Sharma	Usha Bachani	Dr. Anirrudh's mother
Nitai	Avijit Some	Servant of the Duggal family
Simran Rajpal	Nigaar Khan	Wife of Abhi's friend
Rama	Kishwer Merchant	Rohan's elder cousin-in-law, Lallan's sister, Badri's wife, antagonist
Badri Mishra	Manmohan Tiwari	Rohan's elder cousin, Rama's husband
Lallan	Eijaz Khan	Rama's elder brother Kabir Mishra || Ahmad Harhash || Muskaan's brother Abhi and Tara's son
Rajeev	Rajeev Khandelwal	24 and 29 January 2013 as Muskaan's college friend (cameo)
