= Bigg Boss (Hindi TV series) season 16 =

Indian reality show

Bigg Boss
- Season 16
- Presented by: Salman Khan
- No. of days: 134
- No. of housemates: 17
- Winner: MC Stan
- Runner-up: Shiv Thakare
- No. of episodes: 135

Release
- Original network: Colors TV
- Original release: 1 October 2022 – 12 February 2023

Season chronology
- ← Previous; Season 15 Next → Season 17

Bigg Boss 16 also known as Bigg Boss: Iss Baar Bigg Boss Khud Khelenge was the sixteenth season of the Indian Hindi-language reality TV series Bigg Boss. It premiered on Colors TV on 1 October 2022. Salman Khan hosted the show for the thirteenth time. The grand finale aired on 12 February 2023 where MC Stan emerged as the winner and Shiv Thakare as the runner-up. The season went on to become one of the most successful seasons in the show's history.

== Production ==
=== Broadcast ===
For the first time ever, a new segment- Bigg Bulletin with Shekhar Suman aired on Sunday Hosted by Shekhar Suman. Weekend Ka Vaar, namely- Shukravar and Shanivar Ka Vaar aired on Fridays and Saturdays instead of Saturdays and Sundays respectively as in previous seasons. For the first time ever, eviction took place on Saturdays instead of Sundays.

A five-hour Grand Finale aired on 12 February 2023.

=== Casting ===
Colors TV teased the viewers, by giving a glimpse of the first two contestants answering several fan questions on their Instagram stories. This segment was titled "#BB16ContestantFirstLook". They were later on revealed to be Gautam Singh Vig and Soundarya Sharma.

=== Concept ===
The concept for this season of Bigg Boss was "Upside Down", which meant everything would be opposite from the previous seasons.

=== Development ===
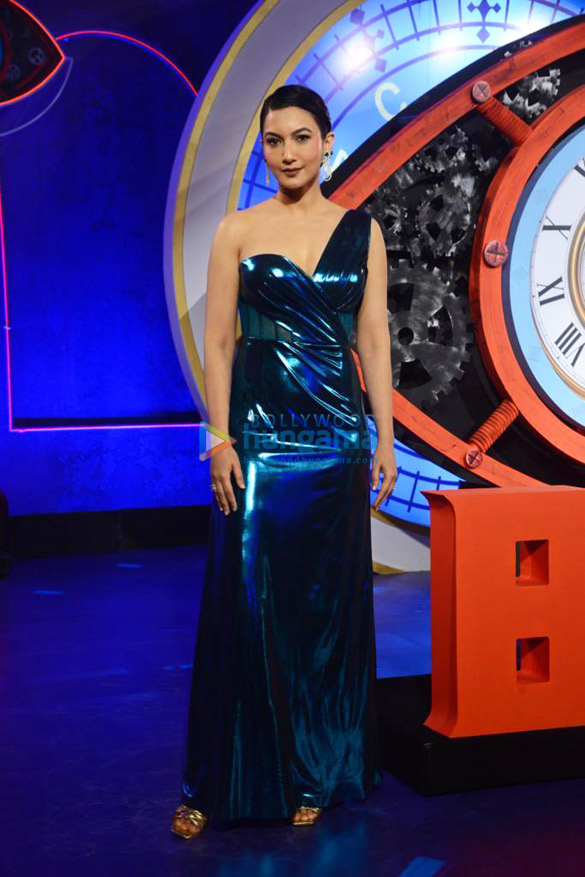
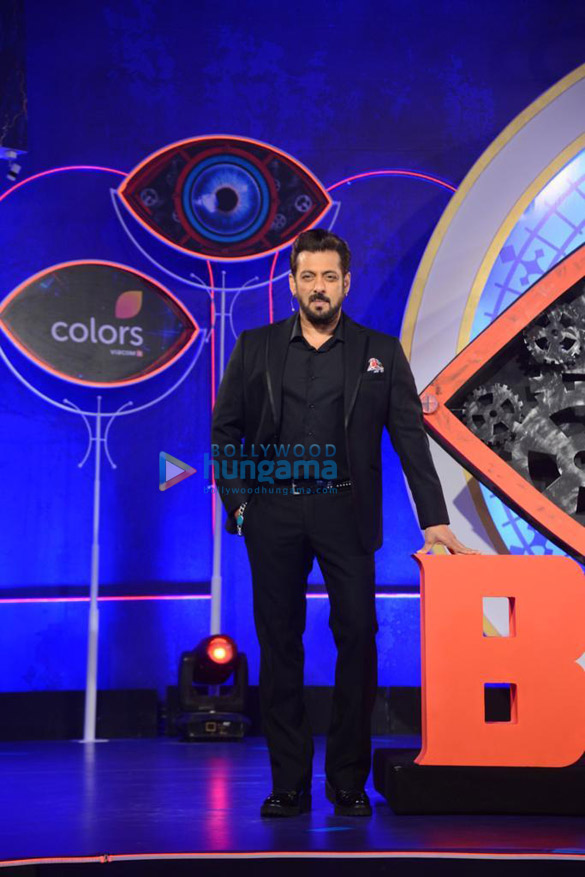
(left to right) Gauahar Khan with Salman Khan Bigg Boss 16 press conference

The press conference and launch event for this season was held on 27 September 2022, anchored by Gauahar Khan, wherein Abdu Rozik was officially introduced as first contestant.

=== Eye Logo ===
The eye logo is very similar to the logo of the thirteenth season. It features a bright red colour logo with a blue pupil.

=== House ===
The house of this season had a "Circus" theme. The House was located in Goregaon for the fourth time. This season had four bedrooms: Fire Room, Black and White Room, Cards Room and Vintage Room and a lavish private Jacuzzi for the captain for the first time in the history of Bigg Boss. The jail of the house was designed as Maut Ka Kuwa (Well of Death) located in a hanging position above the swimming pool.

=== Release ===
A promo featuring Salman Khan was released on 11 September 2022. Promos featuring Gori Nagori, Nimrit Kaur Ahluwalia and Abdu Rozik with Khan were released one day prior to the premiere. Promos featuring Priyanka Chahar Choudhary, Ankit Gupta and Tina Datta were released just before the premiere.

== Housemates status ==
Sr	Housemate	Day entered	Day exited	Status
1	MC Stan	Day 1	Day 134	Winner
2	Shiv	Day 1	Day 134	1st Runner-up
3	Priyanka	Day 1	Day 134	2nd Runner-up
4	Archana	Day 1	Day 40	Ejected
4	Archana	Day 42	Day 134	3rd Runner-up
5	Shalin	Day 1	Day 134	4th Runner-up
6	Nimrit	Day 1	Day 131	Evicted
7	Sumbul	Day 1	Day 125	Evicted
8	Tina	Day 1	Day 70	Evicted
8	Tina	Day 71	Day 118	Evicted
9	Soundarya	Day 1	Day 112	Evicted by Housemates
10	Sajid	Day 1	Day 105	Walked
11	Abdu	Day 1	Day 105	Walked
12	Sreejita	Day 1	Day 14	Evicted
12	Sreejita	Day 63	Day 105	Evicted
13	Vikkas	Day 70	Day 91	Evicted
14	Ankit	Day 1	Day 84	Evicted by Housemates
15	Gautam	Day 1	Day 49	Evicted
16	Gori	Day 1	Day 42	Evicted
17	Manya	Day 1	Day 21	Evicted

== Housemates ==
The list of housemates in the order of entering the house:

=== Original entrants ===
- Nimrit Kaur Ahluwalia – Television actress, model and lawyer. She is best known for her dual roles as Meher Kaur Dhillon Gill and Seher Kaur Gill Babbar in Choti Sarrdaarni.
- Abdu Rozik – Singer, boxer and content creator from Tajikistan. He is known to be the shortest singer in the world.
- Ankit Gupta – Actor and model. He is best known for his leading role as Fateh Singh Virk in Udaariyaan. Gupta also appeared in Kundali Bhagya, Kuch Rang Pyar Ke Aise Bhi and Begusarai
- Priyanka Chahar Choudhary – Actress. She is best known for her leading portrayal of Tejo Kaur Sandhu in the soap drama Udaariyaan.
- Altaf Tadavi "MC Stan"– Rapper and music producer. He is best known for his albums, Tadipaar and Insaan.
- Archana Gautam – Actress, model and politician. She acted in films like Great Grand Masti and Haseena Parkar. She joined Indian National Congress in November 2021.
- Gautam Vig – Actor and model. He is best known for his leading role as Surya Seth in Saath Nibhaana Saathiya 2.
- Shalin Bhanot – Actor. He is best known for his role as Keshav in Naagin 4. Bhanot is the winner of the dance reality show Nach Baliye 4.
- Soundarya Sharma – Actress, model and dentist. She is known for acting in the romantic musical film Ranchi Diaries.
- Shiv Thakare – Reality TV star. He is the winner of Bigg Boss Marathi 2. Shiv also participated in MTV Roadies Rising.
- Sumbul Touqeer – Actress and dancer. She is best known for her role Imlie Chaturvedi Rathore in Imlie and participating in India's Dancing Superstar.
- Manya Singh – Model. She is the runner-up of Femina Miss India 2020.
- Gori Nagori – Dancer. She is a Rajasthani-born dancer who is best known for her performance on different Bhojpuri and Hariyanvi songs.
- Tina Datta – Television actress. She is best known for her dual roles as Ichcha and Meethi in Uttaran. Datta was also seen as a contestant in the stunt-based reality show Fear Factor: Khatron Ke Khiladi 7.
- Sreejita De – Actress. She is best known for her role of Mukta in Uttaran. De has also played Dilruba / Sanam in Nazar and Aliya in Yehh Jadu Hai Jinn Ka!.
- Sajid Khan – Director, filmmaker, comedian and television presenter. He is the brother of Farah Khan. Khan has directed films like Heyy Babyy, Housefull and Housefull 2.

=== Wild card entrants ===
- Vikkas Manaktala – Actor. He is best known for portraying Cadet Amardeep Hudda in Left Right Left and Gangadhar Rao in Jhansi Ki Rani.
- Maheem The Dog -- Gift From Bigg boss with special occasion of christmas.

=== Guest entrants ===
- Fahmaan Khan – Actor. He entered the house to support Sumbul and to promote his show Dharampatnii from days 54 to 55.
- Sunny Nanasaheb Waghchaure – Businessman known as Golden Boy on social media. He stayed in the house from days 60 to 63.
- Sanjay Gujar – Businessman known as Golden Boy on social media. He stayed in the house from days 60 to 63.

== Twists ==
=== Bedroom allotment ===
Housemates were chosen by the Captain / Task winners to be staying in four different bedrooms: Fire Room, Black and White Room, Cards Room and Vintage Room. Every week the bedrooms of the housemates were chosen newly and the housemates had to stay in the chosen bedrooms. In Week 7, members of the Vintage Room and Cards Room were safe from nominations. In Week 8, and Week 10, only members of Vintage Room were safe from nominations. Vintage Room was permanently closed from Week 17. Fire Room was closed from Week 17 but reopened in Week 19. Black & White Room and Cards Room were also closed in Week 19.

Key:

indicates Captain's/King's or Queen's Room
indicates Black and White Room (Room of 4)
indicates Cards Room (Room of 3)
indicates Vintage Room (Room of 2)
indicates Fire Room (Room of 6)

Allotment by	Week 1	Week 2	Week 3		Week 4	Week 5	Week 6	Week 7	Week 8	Week 9	Week 10	Week 11	Week 12	Week 13	Week 14	Week 15	Week 16	Week 17	Week 18	Week 19
Allotment by	Nimrit	Priyanka	Abdu		Archana	None		Sajid	Shiv	Nimrit	Ankit	Soundarya	None							
Allotment by	Nimrit	Priyanka	Gautam		Archana	None		Sajid	Shiv	Nimrit	Ankit	Soundarya	None							
Allotment by	Nimrit	Priyanka	MC Stan		Sajid	None		Sajid	Shiv	Nimrit	Ankit	Soundarya	None							
Allotment by	Nimrit	Priyanka	Sajid		Sajid	None		Sajid	Shiv	Nimrit	Ankit	Soundarya	None							
Stan	Fire		Cards		Fire			Cards			Black & White	Fire	Captain	Fire				Black & White		Fire
Shiv	Fire		Captain	Vintage	Fire			Vintage	King	Cards	Fire			Captain	Fire	Captain	Fire	Black & White		Fire
Priyanka	Black & White		Fire		Black & White			Fire			Vintage	Black & White						Cards		Fire
Archana	Vintage			Captain	Vintage			Fire	Black & White		Fire	Cards								Fire
Shalin	Black & White	Vintage	Cards		Vintage			Black & White		Fire	Cards				Vintage			Black & White		Fire
Nimrit	Captain	Cards	Fire		Black & White			Cards	Vintage	Queen	Fire						Captain			
Sumbul	Black & White							Cards	Black & White			Captain	Vintage					Black & White		
Tina	Fire	Cards	Fire		Cards			Black & White	Vintage		Cards	Captain	Vintage		Black & White			Cards		
Soundarya	Vintage	Black & White	Fire		Cards			Fire			Cards	Captain		Fire	Cards					
Sajid	Fire		Black & White		Fire			King	Cards		Vintage	Fire								
Abdu	Cards	Fire	Black & White		Fire		Captain	Vintage	Cards		Black & White	Fire		Fire	Captain	Fire				
Sreejita	Cards										Fire	Black & White	Captain	Black & White						
Vikkas												Cards								
Ankit	Black & White							Fire			King	Black & White								
Gautam	Cards	Captain	Vintage		Cards	Captain	Cards	Fire												
Gori	Fire		Cards		Fire															
Manya	Vintage	Fire																		

=== Morning Anthem ===
For the first time, there was a Bigg Boss Anthem in the morning instead of the usual wake-up songs.

=== Bigg Bulletin ===
A new segment, Bigg Bulletin with Shekhar Suman, was introduced which Shekhar Suman hosted every Sunday. In this segment, the host interacted with the contestants on the events that have transpired in the particular week. He would also roast the contestants, play games with them and pull off fun gags.

=== MyGlamm Face of the Season ===
In Week 1, it was revealed that all the female housemates would be competitors for MyGlamm Face of the Season through which one female housemate would become the representative of the season. Moreover, the winner of the segment would win ₹25 lakhs and get a chance to shoot for an ad with Shraddha Kapoor for MyGlamm.

On Day 83, Priyanka Chahar Choudhary was declared the winner after 12 weeks through public votes.

=== Confinement punishment(s) ===
	Week 3		Week 6	Week 7
Punishment by	Shiv		Abdu	Sajid
Punishment given to	Archana	Priyanka	Nimrit	Priyanka
Punishment given to	Archana	Priyanka	Shiv	Priyanka
Punishment given to	Soundarya	Priyanka	Shalin	Ankit
Form of Punishment	Maut Ka Kuwa	The Box	Maut Ka Kuwa	Maut Ka Kuwa

=== Maahim (Dog) ===
On Day 87 (Week 13), "Maahim" a St. Bernard dog was sent in the house and it stayed in the house till the finale.

=== Family week ===
In Week 15, family members of the 12 housemates, referred to as VVIPs, entered the house to meet and support them.

Housemate	Connection name	Connection	Day entered	Day exited
Sajid	Farah Khan	Sister	Day 100	Day 100
Shiv	Ashatai Thakare	Mother	Day 100	Day 101
Priyanka	Yogesh Choudhary	Brother	Day 100	Day 101
Stan	Vahida Tadavi	Mother	Day 101	Day 102
Archana	Gulshan Gautam	Brother	Day 101	Day 102
Nimrit	Gurdeep Singh Ahluwalia	Father	Day 101	Day 102
Tina	Madhumita Datta	Mother	Day 102	Day 103
Shalin	Sunita Bhanot	Mother	Day 102	Day 103
Abdu	Just Sul	Friend	Day 102	Day 103
Soundarya	Usha Sharma	Mother	Day 103	Day 104
Sumbul	Iqbal Khan	Uncle	Day 103	Day 104
Sreejita	Michael Blohm-Pape	Fiancé	Day 103	Day 104

== Guest appearances ==
Week(s)	Day(s)	Guest(s)	Notes	Ref.
Premiere	Day 1	Touqeer Khan	To support daughter Sumbul Touqeer
Premiere	Day 1	Shehnaaz Gill	To support Sajid Khan via video message
Week 1	Day 3	Kili Paul	For taking part in the task
Week 1	Day 6	Rashmika Mandanna and Neena Gupta	To promote Goodbye
Week 2	Day 12	Yo Yo Honey Singh, Varun Dhawan, Parineeti Chopra, Shehnaaz Gill, Mika Singh & Urvashi Rautela	To feature in Abdu Rozik's Chota Bhaijaan video
Week 2	Day 13	Touqeer Khan	To interact with daughter Sumbul Touqeer
Week 2	Day 13	Harrdy Sandhu and Parineeti Chopra	To promote Code Name: Tiranga
Week 2	Day 13	Sidharth Malhotra and Rakul Preet Singh	To promote Thank God
Week 2	Day 13	Bhavin Rabari	To promote Chhello Show
Week 3	Day 21	Karan Johar	To host Weekend Ka Vaar in absence of
Week 4	Day 29	Katrina Kaif, Ishaan Khatter and Siddhant Chaturvedi	To promote Phone Bhoot
Week 5	Day 34	Janhvi Kapoor and Sunny Kaushal	To promote Mili
Week 5	Day 34	Sonakshi Sinha, Huma Qureshi, Zaheer Iqbal and Mahat Raghavendra	To promote Double XL
Week 6	Day 41	Arjun Bijlani and Sunny Leone	To promote MTV Splitsvilla X4
Week 6	Day 41	Varun Dhawan and Kriti Sanon	To promote Bhediya
Week 7	Day 49	Ayushmann Khurrana and Jaideep Ahlawat	To promote An Action Hero
Week 8	Day 56	Fahmaan Khan and Kritika Singh Yadav	To promote their show Dharampatnii
Week 8	Day 56	Kajol and Revathi	To promote Salaam Venky
Week 8	Day 56	Sumbul's father, Tina's mother and Shalin's parents	To interact with the host
Week 8	Day 56	Arbaaz Khan, Manav Vij, Sudhir Mishra, Waluscha De Sousa and Sumit Kaul	To promote Tanaav
Week 9	Day 63	Parth Samthaan and Niti Taylor	To promote Kaisi Yeh Yaariaan
Week 10	Day 69	Shehnaaz Gill and MC Square	To promote Ghani Syaani
Week 11	Day 76	Vicky Kaushal and Kiara Advani	To promote Govinda Naam Mera
Week 11	Day 77	Ranveer Singh, Rohit Shetty, Varun Sharma, Pooja Hegde and Jacqueline Fernandez	To promote Cirkus
Week 12	Day 81-82	Vijay Vikram Singh	To distract housemates from performing ration task
Week 12	Day 84	Genelia D'Souza, Riteish Deshmukh	To promote Ved
Week 12	Day 84	Manish Paul	To co-host and celebrate Salman's birthday
Week 14	Day 91	Dharmendra, Tripti shukla, Krushna Abhishek, Kashmera Shah, Karan Kundrra, Jannat Zubair Rahmani, Rajiv Adatia, Meet Bros, Karan Aujla & Nora Fatehi	For New Year celebration
Week 14	Day 92	Ikka and Seedhe Maut	To perform with MC STΔN and celebrate New Year
Week 14	Day 97	Shiv's mother, MC Stan's mother, Archana's brother, Nimrit's father, Tina's mother, Shalin's mother, Sumbul's uncle, Sreejita's fiancé	To interact with the host
Week 15	Day 100	Farah Khan (Sajid's sister)	To meet housemates for Family Week
Week 15	Day 100-101	Ashatai Thakare (Shiv's mother)	To meet housemates for Family Week
Week 15	Day 100-101	Yogesh Choudhary (Priyanka's brother)	To meet housemates for Family Week
Week 15	Day 101-102	Vahida Tadavi (MC Stan's mother)	To meet housemates for Family Week
Week 15	Day 101-102	Gulshan Gautam (Archana's brother)	To meet housemates for Family Week
Week 15	Day 101-102	Gurdeep Singh Ahluwalia (Nimrit's father)	To meet housemates for Family Week
Week 15	Day 102-103	Madhumita Datta (Tina's mother)	To meet housemates for Family Week
Week 15	Day 102-103	Sunita Bhanot (Shalin's mother)	To meet housemates for Family Week
Week 15	Day 102-103	Just Sul (Abdu's friend)	To meet housemates for Family Week
Week 15	Day 103-104	Usha Sharma (Soundarya's mother)	To meet housemates for Family Week
Week 15	Day 103-104	Iqbal Khan (Sumbul's uncle)	To meet housemates for Family Week
Week 15	Day 103-104	Michael Blohm-Pape (Sreejita's fiancé)	To meet housemates for Family Week
Week 15	Day 103-104	Simi Garewal	To host a talk show with housemates and host
Week 15	Day 104	Bharti Singh, Haarsh Limbachiyaa and their son Laksh "Gola"	To interact with the host and housemates
Week 15	Day 105	Dibang and Sandiip Sikcand	To interact with the host and housemates
Week 16	Day 112-113	Astrologer Saurish Sharma	To predict future of housemates and interact with the host
Week 16	Day 113	Sajid Khan	To interact with the host
Week 16	Day 113	Abdu Rozik	To promote his song Pyar
Week 16	Day 114	Ekta Kapoor and Dibakar Banerjee	To interact with the host and cast housemates for their upcoming film LSD 2
Week 17	Day 117	Mika Singh	To promote his song Miss You
Week 17	Day 117	Anil Kapoor	To promote The Night Manager
Week 17	Day 117	Kartik Aaryan	To promote Shehzada
Week 18	Day 125	Badshah	To promote his song Players
Week 18	Day 125	Anupam Kher and Neena Gupta	To promote Shiv Shastri Balboa
Week 18	Day 125	Iulia Vântur and Yo Yo Honey Singh	To promote their song Yai Re
Week 19	Day 130	Krushna Abhishek	To entertain the housemates
Week 19	Day 132	Rohit Shetty	To select the first contestant of Khatron Ke Khiladi 13
Grand Finale	Day 133	Bharti Singh and Krushna Abhishek	To play with the housemates
Grand Finale	Day 133	Sunny Deol and Ameesha Patel	To promote their film Gadar 2: The Katha Continues
Grand Finale	Day 133	Karan Kundrra, Gashmeer Mahajani and Reem Shaikh	To promote Tere Ishq Mein Ghayal
Grand Finale	Day 133	Ankit Gupta, Neha Rana and Gautam Singh Vig	To promote Junooniyatt

== Weekly summary ==
First Day First Show	Entrances	Nimrit, Abdu, Ankit, Priyanka, MC Stan, Archana, Gautam, Shalin, Soundarya, Shiv, Sumbul, Manya, Gori, Tina, Sreejita and Sajid entered the house.
First Day First Show	Twist	Nimrit was made the captain of the house by Bigg Boss as she was the first housemate.
Week 1	Nominations	Shiv, Archana, MC Stan, Sajid, Gori and Gautam were nominated for the first-week eviction.
Week 1	Twists	Bigg Boss broke its 15-year ritual of morning wake-up song and replaced it with Bigg Boss Anthem.; For the first time Bigg Boss will keep an eye on the captain 24/7 and if the captain is negligent, they will be fired from the post immediately.; Bigg Boss again broke its 15-year ritual of nominating people by giving reasons and asked the housemates to nominate their co-contestants directly without reason.
Week 1	Captaincy Task	Nimrit was fired from the captaincy post due to continuous violation of house rules. Nimrit was given a chance to save her captaincy. The contestant who rings the bell first in the garden will get a chance to challenge Nimrit. Shalin rings the bell and challenges Nimrit. The task was that both the contenders will stand on a platform and hold baskets on their heads. The one who drops it first will lose and the other one would become the captain. The other contestants will put things in their baskets. Sajid will be the sanchalak.
Week 1	Captaincy Task	Winner – Nimrit
Week 1	Captaincy Task	Failed – Shalin
Week 1	Tasks	Stand-up comedy: Sajid was asked to do a stand-up comedy show for housemates. If the housemates liked it, Sajid would get a special advantage to distribute the ration among the 4 bedrooms.; Reel competition: There was a reel competition between MC Stan and Abdu. Their managers, Sumbul and Shiv would convince the housemates to do a reel with them. The person who does maximum reels with the housemates wins the task and would get a special advantage to change the bed positions of the housemates.; Immunity task: Gori was told to do a special dance performance for the housemates. If all housemates like her performance and join her. She will get an advantage to immune one nominated housemate including herself. If no one likes her performance, the rest of the nominated housemates will have to mutually decide to immune one housemate other than Gori.
Week 1	Result	Stand-up comedy: Sajid won the task and distributed the ration among the 4 bedrooms.; Reel competition: MC Stan made maximum reels with housemates and won the task. MC Stan and Sumbul also got the advantage of changing the bed positions.; Immunity Task: Gori successfully completed the task and saved herself from nominations.
Week 1	Punishments	Tina, Manya and Soundarya were punished for saying sorry during nominations and were told to do all the work in the house until the next notice.; Nimrit was fired from captaincy as she was negligent.
Week 1	House Captain	Nimrit
Week 1	Notes	Nimrit was asked to select one person from Tina, Manya and Soundarya who will be freed from doing all housework. She chose Manya and replaced her with Priyanka.
Week 1	Exits	On Day 8, no eviction took place.
Week 2
Week 2	Nominations	Gori, MC Stan, Sreejita, Tina and Shalin were nominated for second-week eviction by house captain Gautam.
Week 2	Captaincy Task	Gautam and Shiv competed for the captaincy task. The task was that both the contenders will stand on a platform and hold baskets on their heads. The one who drops it first will lose and the other one would become the captain. Other contestants will put things in their baskets and Nimrit will be the sanchalak.
Week 2	Captaincy Task	Winner – Gautam
Week 2	Captaincy Task	Failed – Shiv
Week 2	Tasks	Music video: Nimrit and Priyanka would have to make a music video with Abdu as the main lead on Chota Bhaijaan which was sung by Abdu. The one who made a better video will get a special advantage in changing the bed positions of the housemates.
Week 2	Result	Priyanka's music video was chosen as the best and she won the task and got the advantage in changing the bed positions of the housemates.
Week 2	Punishments	Shalin was punished for being physical with Archana Gautam and was nominated for 2 weeks ~~and also he would not be able to become a contender for captaincy for the entire season~~. (Shalin contended for captaincy after his punishment was called-off in Week 10); Gori, MC Stan, Sreejita and Tina were chosen by captain Gautam for using derogatory language in the house and were nominated directly for eviction.
Week 2	House Captain	Gautam
Week 2	Notes	Bigg Boss asked contestants to name the most irritating person in the house. The housemates named Archana, and as a result, Bigg Boss asked Archana to stay silent and Shalin would be her voice for conveying her messages to all the housemates until his next order. They fulfilled their order and Archana got 1 kg of Ginger and Shalin got 1 week's supply of chicken.
Week 2	Exits	On Day 13, Sreejita De was evicted after facing public votes.
Week 3
Week 3	Nominations	Manya, Shalin and Sumbul were nominated for third-week eviction.
Week 3	Captaincy Task	Shiv and Priyanka competed for the captaincy task. Both contenders had to make as many lines as they can with wooden domino bricks of a specific colour. After the time ends, sanchalak Gautam will decide who won the task on the basis of the lengths of the lines of bricks and maintaining the rules.
Week 3	Captaincy Task	Winner – Shiv
Week 3	Captaincy Task	Failed – Priyanka
Week 3	Tasks	BB Train: Four favourite members including Abdu, Sajid, MC Stan and Gautam were selected from the choices of all the housemates. These four individuals got the exclusive right to include a housemate in their rooms.
Week 3	Result	[Check Bedroom Allotment]
Week 3	Punishments	Archana and Soundarya were sentenced to jail Maut Ka Kuwa for the time being.; Priyanka was punished by Captain Shiv after the former refused to perform her duties and was kept in the Box for a certain amount of time.; Shiv was fired from Captaincy on Day 20 and Archana was made the House Captain by Bigg Boss.
Week 3	House Captain	~~Shiv~~
Week 3	House Captain	Archana
Week 3	Notes	Karan Johar hosted Weekend Ka Vaar instead of Salman Khan as Salman was sick because of Dengue fever.
Week 3	Exits	On Day 21, Manya Singh was evicted after facing public votes.
Week 4
Week 4	Nominations	Abdu, Gautam, Gori, Nimrit, Shiv, Soundarya and Tina were nominated for the fourth-week eviction.
Week 4	Captaincy Task	All housemates had to fight to achieve the throne kept in Activity Area. The losing housemates will be confined in the cage by order under the throne with 2 options - remove the throne-winning person from Captaincy's race & take a particular amount of ration or keep that person as a candidate for Captaincy and sacrifice the extra ration.
Week 4	Captaincy Task	Winner – None
Week 4	Captaincy Task	Failed – All contestants
Week 4	Tasks	
Week 4	Result	Captaincy task was dissolved.
Week 4	Punishments	Nimrit and Soundarya were punished by Bigg Boss due to their overuse of English and punished to repeat the same sentence in Hindi again and again given by Bigg Boss until next command.
Week 4	House Captain	None
Week 4	Notes	
Week 4	Exits	On Day 29, no eviction took place.
Week 5
Week 5	Nominations	Archana, Soundarya and Sumbul were nominated for fifth-week eviction.
Week 5	Captaincy Task	On Day 29 Salman Khan offered Captaincy to Gautam giving the condition that Gautam had to sacrifice the housemates' ration to achieve the captaincy. Gautam accepted the offer.; On Day 33, all the 4 ex-captains, Nimrit, Gautam, Shiv and Archana, will be the pied pipers and the remaining housemates except Shalin will be the contenders, There will be 4 rounds, each round, one pied piper will take 2 contenders to the swimming pool and tell them to go to the pool and explain why they are removed from captaincy contenders' race. The last housemate remaining will become the new Captain.
Week 5	Captaincy Task	Winner – Gautam
Week 5	Captaincy Task	Failed – None
Week 5	Captaincy Task	Winner – Abdu
Week 5	Captaincy Task	Failed – None
Week 5	Tasks	
Week 5	Result	
Week 5	Punishments	On Day 32, Gautam was fired from captaincy due to his failure to handle the house and housemates.
Week 5	House Captain	~~Gautam~~
Week 5	House Captain	Abdu
Week 5	Notes	Nominated contestants were asked to choose their representatives whom they trust. Archana, Soundarya and Sumbul chose Priyanka, Gautam and Sajid respectively. These three representatives were offered to choose between either saving all the nominated contestants from eviction and losing 25 lakh rupees from prize money, or keeping the prize money and letting one of them get evicted per public votes. They chose to save them, and the housemates lost 25 lakhs from the 50-lakh prize money.
Week 5	Exits	On Day 33, Tina Datta walked out of the house as she got the news that her pet dog died. She re-entered on the same day after some time.; On Day 35, no eviction took place.
Week 6
Week 6	Nominations	Gori, Priyanka and Sumbul were nominated for sixth-week eviction.
Week 6	Captaincy Task	On Day 39, Bigg Boss gave power to contestants on whether they want Abdu to remain captain or not. There were two godowns and every time two housemates will go and collect gold bars in a bag and put the bag in either the "For Abdu" rack or the "Change Abdu" rack, whichever compartment will have more gold will win. Priyanka was the sanchalak in this task. At the end of the task, Priyanka chose the "Change Abdu" godown for the win.
Week 6	Captaincy Task	Winner – Contestants who decided to change Abdu (Soundarya, Archana and Gautam)
Week 6	Captaincy Task	Failed – Contestants who decided not to change Abdu (Tina, Nimrit and Sajid)
Week 6	Tasks	
Week 6	Result	
Week 6	Punishments	Nimrit, Shiv and Shalin were sentenced to jail Maut Ka Kuwa by Captain Abdu Rozik for the time being.
Week 6	House Captain	~~Abdu~~
Week 6	House Captain	No Captain
Week 6	Notes	
Week 6	Exits	On Day 40, Archana Gautam was ejected due to physical violence with Shiv Thakare.; On Day 42, Gori Nagori was evicted after facing public votes.
Week 7
Week 7	Entrances	On Day 43, Archana Gautam re-entered the house.
Week 7	Nominations	Gautam, Shalin, Soundarya and Tina were nominated for seventh-week eviction.
Week 7	Captaincy Task	Guide and tourist task: On hearing the buzzer, the contestants will be asked to take the form of a mannequin except for Sajid, as he is the guide for the activity. Sajid as a guide has to take two housemates on a house tour and while the tour is ongoing, he has to take the two selected inmates to every mannequin one by one. Later, Sajid will take the two chosen contestants to the activity room. In the activity room, the contestants will have to tell the names of three housemates with reasons on who and why they think should be out of captainship. The last housemate remaining will become the new captain.
Week 7	Captaincy Task	Winner – Sajid
Week 7	Captaincy Task	Failed – Other housemates
Week 7	Tasks	
Week 7	Result	
Week 7	Punishments	Sumbul was removed from King's favourite contestants and was put into the non-favourite ones for helping Captain Sajid to write by giving her lipstick.
Week 7	House; King	Sajid
Week 7	Royal Favourites	Abdu, Nimrit, Tina, MC Stan and Shiv
Week 7	Notes	From 7th week, there were King or Queen instead of Captain.
Week 7	Exits	On Day 48, Gautam Vig was evicted after facing public votes.
Week 8
Week 8	Entrances	On Day 55, Fahmaan Khan entered the house to support Sumbul and promote his upcoming show Dharampatnii.
Week 8	Nominations	MC Stan, Archana, Ankit, Sumbul and Soundarya were nominated for eighth-week eviction.
Week 8	Captaincy Task	Raja's favourite housemates (including Shiv, Nimrit, Abdu and excluding MC Stan due to his punishment) will have to do a task given by other non-favourite housemates (Priyanka, Archana, Ankit). Sajid was made the sanchalak. Nimrit was disqualified from the race as she broke the rule whereas Shiv and Abdu completed their tasks. For the tie-breaker, the rest of the other non-favorite housemates (Soundarya, Tina, Shalin) had to pick a captain between the two, resulting in the three choosing Shiv.
Week 8	Captaincy Task	Winner – Shiv
Week 8	Captaincy Task	Failed – Nimrit and Abdu
Week 8	Tasks	Nomination Task: Nimrit, Shiv and Tina had to choose between 2 contestants to nominate for eviction. Contestants had to give reasons on why they deserved to be safe from nomination. After both contestants give their statements, Nimrit, Shiv and Tina will choose one contestant to save and nominate the other by shooting at him/her. Housemates' list of each round: Round 1 (Shiv)- Priyanka and Archana; Round 2 (Tina)- Sajid and Ankit; Round 3 (Shiv)- Abdu and Soundarya; Round 4 (Nimrit)- Shalin and Sumbul; Key: indicate the housemate is safe. indicate the housemate is nominated.
Week 8	Result	Archana, Ankit, Soundarya and Sumbul were shot and nominated by Shiv, Tina and Nimrit respectively.
Week 8	Punishments	MC Stan was nominated by Bigg Boss for four consecutive weeks for physical violence with Shalin.
Week 8	House; King	Shiv
Week 8	Royal Favourites	Nimrit and Tina
Week 8	Notes	
Week 8	Exits	On Day 56, guest Fahmaan Khan exited the house.; On Day 56, no eviction took place.
Week 9
Week 9	Entrances	On Day 59, Sunny Waghchoure and Sanjay Gujar entered the house as guest entrants.
Week 9	Nominations	MC Stan, Priyanka, Sajid, Shalin, Shiv, Sumbul and Tina were nominated for ninth-week eviction.
Week 9	Captaincy Task	Royal favourites Nimrit and Tina were contenders to be Queen. Previous King Shiv had to decide who the Queen would be among the two. Shiv decided to make Nimrit the Queen. As a result, Nimrit became Queen for the week.
Week 9	Captaincy Task	Winner – Nimrit
Week 9	Captaincy Task	Failed – Tina
Week 9	Tasks	Nomination Task: The garden area was turned into a war field. Contestants were divided into two teams: Team of 7 and Team of 4. Each contestant had one military camp after his/her name. Every time there is an emergency alarm, Nimrit had to spin the wheel of fortune. The winning team would send one contestant to blast the camp of any contestant according to their will. The blasted camp's owner contestant was nominated for eviction directly. Nimrit and MC Stan were out of the task as Nimrit was Queen and MC Stan was already nominated by Bigg Boss. Round 1: Winner - Team of 7 Blaster - Shalin; Blasted - Sumbul Round 2: Winner - Team of 4 Blaster - Archana; Blasted - Shiv Round 3: Winner - Team of 4 Blaster - Priyanka; Blasted - Sajid Round 4: Winner - Team of 4 Blaster - Soundarya; Blasted - Shalin Round 5: Winner - Team of 7 Blaster - Shiv; Blasted - Priyanka Round 6: Winner - Team of 4 Blaster - Ankit; Blasted - Tina
Week 9	Result	Sumbul, Shiv, Sajid, Shalin, Priyanka and Tina's camps were blasted and they were nominated for eviction.
Week 9	Punishments	MC Stan's punishment given by Bigg Boss continued for the week and he was directly nominated for eviction.; Archana, Ankit, Priyanka, Shalin and Soundarya were punished by Bigg Boss for sleeping despite Bigg Boss's command not to sleep. As a punishment, other contestants had to splash water on them to wake them up. As Archana refused to accept the punishment and everyone failed to convince her the same, half of the ration was taken away by Bigg Boss.
Week 9	House; Queen	Nimrit
Week 9	Royal Favourites	None
Week 9	Notes	
Week 9	Exits	On Day 63, guests Sunny Nanasaheb Waghchoure and Sanjay Gujar exited the house.; On Day 63, no eviction took place.
Week 10
Week 10	Entrances	On Day 68, Sreejita De re-entered the house as the first wild card entrant.; On Day 69, Vikkas Manaktala entered the house as the second wild card entrant.
Week 10	Nominations	MC Stan, Nimrit, Tina and Sumbul were nominated for the tenth-week eviction.
Week 10	Captaincy Task	
Week 10	Captaincy Task	Winner – Ankit
Week 10	Captaincy Task	Failed – Priyanka, Shalin and Sumbul
Week 10	Tasks	
Week 10	Result	
Week 10	Punishments	MC Stan's punishment given by Bigg Boss continued for the week and he was directly nominated for eviction.
Week 10	House; King	Ankit
Week 10	Royal Favourites	Priyanka and Sajid
Week 10	Notes	Shalin was offered to choose between either saving Tina and Sumbul both from eviction and losing the remaining 25 lakh rupees of prize money, or keeping the prize money and letting one of them get evicted per public votes. Shalin chose the prize money.
Week 10	Exits	On Day 70, Tina Datta was evicted after facing public votes.
Week 11
Week 11	Entrances	On Day 71, Tina Datta re-entered the house.
Week 11	Nominations	Sajid, Shalin, Shiv and Tina were nominated for the eleventh-week eviction.
Week 11	Captaincy Task	
Week 11	Captaincy Task	Winner – Soundarya, Sumbul and Tina
Week 11	Captaincy Task	Failed – Priyanka and Shalin
Week 11	Tasks	
Week 11	Result	
Week 11	Punishments	
Week 11	House; Captains	Soundarya
Week 11	House; Captains	Sumbul
Week 11	House; Captains	Tina
Week 11	Notes	Shalin was again offered to choose between either getting Tina back in the house and losing the remaining 25 lakh rupees of prize money, or keeping the prize money and letting Tina out of the house. Shalin chose Tina to come back, losing the remaining prize money.; Week 11 onwards, there were again Captain and not King or Queen, but the twist is that not one but three Captains would run the house.
Week 11	Exits	On Day 77, no eviction took place.; On day 77, Abdu Rozik walked out of the House due to professional commitment.
Week 12
Week 12	Nominations	Ankit, Sreejita, Tina and Vikkas were nominated for the twelfth-week eviction.
Week 12	Captaincy Task	
Week 12	Captaincy Task	Winner – Soundarya, MC Stan and Sreejita
Week 12	Captaincy Task	Failed – Other Housemates
Week 12	Tasks	
Week 12	Result	
Week 12	Punishments	
Week 12	House; Captains	MC Stan
Week 12	House; Captains	Soundarya
Week 12	House; Captains	Sreejita
Week 12	Notes	Priyanka was offered by Bigg Boss to choose between saving Ankit Gupta from on-the-spot eviction or getting 25 lakh rupees of prize money back. Priyanka chose to save Ankit from eviction.; Priyanka won the MyGlamm Face of the Season contest through public votes with a prize amount of ₹25 lakhs and a chance to shoot for an ad with Shraddha Kapoor for MyGlamm.
Week 12	Exits	On Day 84, Ankit Gupta was evicted after facing housemates' votes.
Week 13
Week 13	Entrances	On Day 85, Abdu Rozik re-entered the house. On Day 87, a St. Bernard dog "Maahim" entered the house.
Week 13	Nominations	Nimrit, Priyanka, Shalin, Soundarya, Sreejita, Sumbul, Tina and Vikkas were nominated for the thirteenth-week eviction.; Sumbul was saved from nomination by Shiv Thakare.
Week 13	Captaincy Task	Housemates were asked to choose any three among the five non-nominated contestants (including Archana, Shiv, Abdu, MC Stan, and Sajid) for the captaincy contenders' race. Shiv, Abdu, and MC Stan were chosen, and then fans were invited by the show in the Bigg Boss house to choose their favourite contestant amongst the three as the new captain. Shiv Thakare won, becoming the new captain.
Week 13	Captaincy Task	Winner – Shiv
Week 13	Captaincy Task	Failed – Abdu and MC Stan
Week 13	Tasks	Nomination Task The nomination process of the week was held through ration tasks. The housemates had to take ration from the Activity Area in exchange for nominating other housemates. Housemates were to go to the Activity Area in pairs. They had to nominate 1 housemate for 5 items & 2 housemates for 10 items. The pairs: Pairs / Nominated Housemates; Nimrit and Tina / Priyanka and Sumbul; Archana and Shiv / Sreejita and Vikkas; Shalin and Priyanka / Soundarya and Nimrit; Soundarya and Sajid / Tina and Shalin; MC Stan did not take part in the process as he was the House King. Sreejita, Sumbul and Vikkas were banned from taking part in the task.
Week 13	Result	
Week 13	Punishments	
Week 13	House; Captain	Shiv
Week 13	Notes	Now again, not three but only a single Captain would run the house.
Week 13	Exits	On Day 90, Vikkas Manaktala was evicted after facing public votes.
Week 14
Week 14	Nominations	Archana, Sajid, Shalin, Soundarya, Sreejita, Sumbul and Tina were nominated for the fourteenth-week eviction.
Week 14	Captaincy Task	
Week 14	Captaincy Task	Winner – Abdu
Week 14	Captaincy Task	Failed – MC Stan, Nimrit and Priyanka
Week 14	Tasks	Nomination Task The garden area was turned into a village called BBpur having separate houses for each contestant except Shiv. All the housemates were sorted in their houses while Shiv was sorted in the glass room. Every house had a bulb in them while electric fuses of the houses were under Shiv's control which referred the housemates to be safe from nomination. Shiv was asked to cut seven electric lines to nominate them. The contestants with lit bulbs will be safe from nomination. Shiv's Nomination: Nominated Contestants / Saved Contestants; Archana / Abdu; Priyanka / Abdu; Shalin / MC Stan; Soundarya / MC Stan; Sreejita / Nimrit; Sumbul / Nimrit; Tina / Sajid; After Shiv's nomination, it was revealed that 4 contestants chosen by the spinning wheel would get the power to swap one safe contestant with one nominated contestant. Chosen Contestants' Nomination: Chosen Housemate / Saved / Nominated; Nimrit / Sumbul / Sajid; Sreejita / Priyanka / Sumbul; Shalin / Tina / Nimrit; Abdu / Nimrit / Tina
Week 14	Result	Nomination Task; At the end of the task, Abdu, MC Stan, Nimrit and Priyanka's houses had lit bulbs while others' electric lines were cut.
Week 14	Punishments	On Day 96, rations of all the housemates were asked to return, due to failure in the Ration or Nomination task by all the seven nominated contestants.
Week 14	House; Captain	Abdu
Week 14	Notes	
Week 14	Exits	On Day 98, no eviction took place.
Week 15
Week 15	Entrances	On Day 100, Farah Khan, Ashatai Thakare and Yogesh Chaudhary entered the house to meet Sajid, Shiv and Priyanka respectively.; On Day 101, Vahida Tadavi, Gulshan Gautam and Gurdeep Singh Ahluwalia entered the house to meet MC Stan, Archana and Nimrit respectively.; On Day 102, Madhumita Datta, Sunita Bhanot and Just Sul entered the house to meet Tina, Shalin and Abdu respectively.; On Day 103, Usha Sharma, Iqbal Khan and Michael Blohm-Pape entered the house to meet Soundarya, Sumbul and Sreejita respectively.
Week 15	Nominations	MC Stan, Nimrit, Sumbul and Sreejita were nominated for the fifteenth-week eviction.
Week 15	Captaincy Task	
Week 15	Captaincy Task	Winner – Shiv
Week 15	Captaincy Task	Failed – Other Housemates
Week 15	Tasks	
Week 15	Result	
Week 15	Punishments	
Week 15	House; Captain	Shiv
Week 15	Notes	
Week 15	Exits	On Day 100, Farah Khan exited the house.; On Day 101, Ashatai Thakare and Yogesh Chaudhary exited the house.; On Day 102, Vahida Tadavi, Gulshan Gautam and Gurdeep Singh Ahluwalia exited the house.; On Day 103, Madhumita Datta, Sunita Bhanot and Just Sul exited the house.; On Day 104, Usha Sharma, Iqbal Khan and Michael Blohm-Pape exited the house.; On Day 104, Sreejita De was evicted after facing public votes.; On Day 105, Abdu Rozik made the 'Voluntary Exit' from the show due to professional commitments.; On Day 106, Sajid Khan made the 'Voluntary Exit' from the show due to professional commitments.
Week 16
Week 16	Nominations	Shalin, Soundarya, Sumbul and Tina were nominated for the sixteenth-week eviction.
Week 16	Captaincy Task	
Week 16	Captaincy Task	Winner – Nimrit
Week 16	Captaincy Task	Failed – Other Housemates
Week 16	Tasks	Ration Task; The corner of the garden area was turned into a ration shop called 10 lakh ka ration . The contestants had to compete in order to get the rations. Whoever crosses the red line in front of the shop first gets a chance to shop. The rations were related to ₹10 lakh the prize money meaning that the spent money on ration will be deducted from the prize money. Captain Nimrit was declared as sanchalak and got the chance to take ration from any housemate according to her will.: Round / Winning Housemate; 1 / Shalin; 2 / Shiv; 3 / Shiv; 4 / Soundarya; 5 / Shalin; At the end of the task, ₹8.2 lakhs was spent on ration and the rest ₹1.8 were added to prize money making it ₹21.8 lakhs.
Week 16	Result	
Week 16	Punishments	
Week 16	House; Captain	Nimrit
Week 16	Notes	
Week 16	Exits	On Day 112, Soundarya Sharma was evicted after facing housemates' votes.
Week 17
Week 17	Nominations	Priyanka, Shalin, Shiv and Tina were nominated for the seventeenth-week eviction.
Week 17	Tasks	Nomination Task; The activity area was turned into a garden with a giant crow having a bowl in front of it. Another bowl was placed opposite the crow filled with red liquid (referred to as blood) in it. The housemates had to pick up given stone props, dip them in the blood and throw them in a bowl in front of the crow to nominate two housemates. Nimrit was declared safe in the task due to being the Captain & having the Ticket to Finale.: Nominating Housemate / Nominated Housemates; Shalin / Tina / Priyanka; Nimrit / Tina / Priyanka; Archana / Shiv / Shalin; Tina / Shalin / Shiv; MC Stan / Archana / Tina; Shiv / Archana / Tina; Priyanka / Shalin / Shiv; Sumbul / Tina / Priyanka; Ration Task; The garden area was turned into a super shop having mini shops where the housemates had to earn their ration through tasks. Each time 2 housemates would shop for the ration. Mini shops were categorized as Vegetarian, Non-vegetarian, and Others.: Round / Shopper Housemates / / Chosen shop; 1 / Tina / Nimrit / Vegetarian; 2 / Shalin / Priyanka / Others; 3 / Shiv / Archana / Vegetarian; 4 / MC Stan / Sumbul / Others; At the end of the task, 1 packet of chicken was given to Tina by Bigg Boss without any round due to her health issue. Though Shalin was offered to take the chicken by Tina in return she took it before, Shalin refused it and the chicken was taken by Tina. Later, Shalin was also given 1 packet of chicken by Bigg Boss.
Week 17	Result	
Week 17	Punishments	
Week 17	House; Captain	Nimrit
Week 17	Notes	On Day 116, Fire Room and Vintage Room were permanently closed henceforth.; Farah Khan hosted Weekend Ka Vaar instead of Salman Khan.
Week 17	Exits	On Day 114, Tina Datta walked out of the house for emergency medical treatment re-entering after a while.; On Day 119, Tina Datta was evicted after facing public votes.
Week 18
Week 18	Nominations	Shiv, MC Stan and Sumbul were nominated for the eighteenth-week eviction.
Week 18	House; Captain	Nimrit
Week 18	Exits	On Day 126, Sumbul Touqeer was evicted after facing public votes.
Week 19 Finale Week
Week 19 Finale Week	Nominations	Archana, MC Stan, Nimrit, Priyanka, Shalin and Shiv were nominated for the final eviction.; After Nimrit's eviction, the 5 finalists were nominated so the public would vote for their favourite housemate to win the season.
Week 19 Finale Week	Tasks	BB Finale Ka Chunav: All 6 housemates had to entertain the live audience who entered the house and the live audience would vote for them. The housemate with fewer votes would be directly evicted.
Week 19 Finale Week	Happenings	On Day 127, All the housemates had to rank themselves between 1-6, and accordingly, the Ration will be provided; On Day 128, the BB Finale Ka Chunav task was conducted and the final eviction was announced; On Day 129, Krushna Abhishek entertained the housemates; On Day 130, The media and press interview was conducted and they interviewed the 5 finalists; On Day 131, All 5 finalists' journey video was shown; On Day 132, Rohit Shetty entered the house and selected the first contestant of Fear Factor: Khatron Ke Khiladi 13
Week 19 Finale Week	Notes	After Nimrit's Eviction, All the rooms were closed and only the Fire Room was open.
Week 19 Finale Week	Exits	On Day 128, Nimrit Kaur Ahluwalia was evicted after facing live audience votes.
Finalists
4th Runner Up		Shalin Bhanot
3rd Runner Up		Archana Gautam
2nd Runner Up		Priyanka
1st Runner Up		Shiv Thakare
Winner		Mc Stan

== Nominations table ==
	Week 1		Week 2	Week 3	Week 4	Week 5	Week 6	Week 7	Week 8	Week 9	Week 10	Week 11	Week 12	Week 13	Week 14			Week 15	Week 16	Week 17	Week 18	Week 19		
	Week 1		Week 2	Week 3	Week 4	Week 5	Week 6	Week 7	Week 8	Week 9	Week 10	Week 11	Week 12	Week 13	Day 93	Day 94	Day 128	Week 15	Week 16	Week 17	Week 18	Day 134		
Nominees for Captaincy	No Nominees	Shalin	Gautam; Shiv	Priyanka; Shiv	No; Nominees		Abdu; Ankit; Gori; Stan; Priyanka; Sajid; Soundarya; Sumbul; Tina	No; Captain				Priyanka; Soundarya; Shalin; Sumbul; Tina	~~Abdu~~; Soundarya; Vikkas	Abdu; MC Stan; Shiv			Abdu; Priyanka; MC Stan	Abdu; Archana; Priyanka; Sajid; Shalin; Shiv; Soundarya; Tina	No; Nominees			No; Captain		
House Captain	~~Gautam~~	~~Shiv~~	Archana	~~Gautam~~	Abdu	Tina	Stan	No; Captain				Shiv			Abdu	Shiv						No; Captain		
House Captain	~~Gautam~~	~~Shiv~~	Archana	~~Gautam~~	Abdu	Soundarya		No; Captain				Shiv			Abdu	Shiv						No; Captain		
House Captain	~~Gautam~~	~~Shiv~~	Archana	~~Gautam~~	Abdu	Sumbul	Sreejita	No; Captain				Shiv			Abdu	Shiv						No; Captain		
House Captain's Nominations	Not eligible	Shiv Archana	Gori; Stan; Sreejita; Tina	Sumbul; Manya	Gori	Not eligible	Nimrit; Sajid; Stan; Shiv (to save)	No; Captain				Ankit; Sajid (to evict)	Tina (to evict)	Sreejita; Vikkas (to evict) Sumbul (to save)	Tina; Shalin; Priyanka; Archana; Soundarya; Sreejita; Sumbul (to evict)		Not eligible	Abdu; Shalin; Soundarya; Tina (to evict)	Shalin; Tina (to evict)	Tina; Priyanka (to evict)	Not eligible	No; Captain		
House Captain's Nominations	Not eligible	Shiv Archana	Gori; Stan; Sreejita; Tina	Sumbul; Manya	Gori	Not eligible	Nimrit; Sajid; Stan; Shiv (to save)	No; Captain				Ankit Nimrit Priyanka (to save)	Priyanka Ankit (to evict)	Sreejita; Vikkas (to evict) Sumbul (to save)	Tina; Shalin; Priyanka; Archana; Soundarya; Sreejita; Sumbul (to evict)		Not eligible	Abdu; Shalin; Soundarya; Tina (to evict)	Shalin; Tina (to evict)	Tina; Priyanka (to evict)	Not eligible	No; Captain		
House Captain's Nominations	Not eligible	Shiv Archana	Gori; Stan; Sreejita; Tina	Sumbul; Manya	Gori	Not eligible	Nimrit; Sajid; Stan; Shiv (to save)	No; Captain				Priyanka Shalin (to evict)	Vikkas (to evict)	Sreejita; Vikkas (to evict) Sumbul (to save)	Tina; Shalin; Priyanka; Archana; Soundarya; Sreejita; Sumbul (to evict)		Not eligible	Abdu; Shalin; Soundarya; Tina (to evict)	Shalin; Tina (to evict)	Tina; Priyanka (to evict)	Not eligible	No; Captain		
Nominees for Kingship	No; King/ Queen							All Housemates	Abdu; Nimrit; Shiv	Nimrit; Shiv; Tina	Sumbul; Ankit; Shalin; Priyanka	No; King/ Queen												
House King/ Queen	No; King/ Queen							Sajid	Shiv	Nimrit	Ankit	No; King/ Queen												
King's / Queen's Nominations	No; King/ Queen							Not eligible	Priyanka; Abdu (to save) Archana; Soundarya (to evict)	Not eligible	Priyanka; Sajid (to save)	No; King/ Queen												
Vote to:	Evict						Save	Evict								Save		Evict			9-Min	None	WIN	
MC Stan	Not eligible	Gautam; Priyanka	Nominated	Sumbul; Manya	Tina	Archana; Sumbul	Safe	Royal; Favourite	Nominated	Nominated	Nominated	Priyanka; Shalin; Ankit	House; Captain	Not eligible	Safe			Tina; Shalin; Soundarya; Abdu	Soundarya; Archana	Archana; Tina	10:10 Min	No; Nominations	No; Nominations	Winner (Day 134)
Shiv	Not eligible	Gautam; Sreejita	Safe	~~House~~; ~~Captain~~	Soundarya	Soundarya; Sumbul	Safe	Royal; Favourite	House; King	Priyanka	Tina; Soundarya	Priyanka; Shalin; Ankit	Ankit; Vikkas	House; Captain			Not eligible	House; Captain	Shalin; Archana	Archana; Tina	9:50 Min	No; Nominations	No; Nominations	1st runner-up (Day 134)
Priyanka	Not eligible	Sajid; Stan	Safe	Manya; Sumbul	Soundarya	Archana; Shalin	Nominated	Shalin	Not eligible	Sajid	Royal; Favourite Tina; Nimrit	Shiv; Nimrit	Sumbul; Shiv	Nimrit; Soundarya	Not eligible			Nimrit; Stan; Sumbul; Sreejita	Soundarya; Sumbul	Shalin; Shiv	12:34 Min	No; Nominations	No; Nominations	2nd runner-up (Day 134)
Archana	Not eligible	Stan; Sajid	Safe	Sajid; Sumbul	House; Captain	Ankit; Sumbul	Ejected (Day 40)	Not eligible	Nominated	Shiv	Tina; Nimrit	Sumbul; Shiv; Nimrit; Tina; Shalin; Sajid; Ankit	Ankit; Vikkas	Sreejita; Vikkas	Nominated			Nimrit; Stan; Sumbul; Sreejita	Shiv; Stan	Shalin; Shiv	14 Min	No; Nominations	No; Nominations	3rd runner-up (Day 134)
Shalin	Not eligible	Sajid; Abdu	Nominated	Manya; Sumbul	Shiv	Priyanka; Soundarya	Safe	Gautam	Not eligible	Sumbul	Archana; Sumbul	Sajid	Archana; Sreejita	Nimrit; Soundarya	Nimrit	Tina		Nimrit; Stan; Sumbul; Sreejita	Soundarya; Sumbul	Tina; Priyanka	7:27 Min	No; Nominations	No; Nominations	4th runner-up (Day 134)
Nimrit	~~House~~; ~~Captain~~	House; Captain	Safe	Manya; Sumbul	Gautam	Soundarya; Sumbul	Safe	Royal; Favourite	Sumbul	House; Queen	Not eligible	Priyanka; Shalin; Ankit	Priyanka; Ankit	Priyanka; Sumbul	Sajid	Sumbul		Tina; Shalin; Soundarya; Abdu	House; Captain			No; Nominations	Evicted (Day 128)	
Sumbul	Not eligible	Manya; Sajid	Safe	Sajid; Manya	Abdu	Archana; Shiv	Nominated	Royal; Favourite	Nominated	Not eligible	Tina; Shalin	House; Captain	Priyanka; Ankit	Banned	Nominated			Tina; Shalin; Soundarya; Abdu	Tina; Shalin	Tina; Priyanka	17:1 Min	Evicted (Day 125)		
Tina	Not eligible	Sajid; Stan	Nominated	Manya; Sumbul	Gautam	Archana; Soundarya	Safe	Soundarya	Ankit	Not eligible	Not eligible	Evicted (Day 70)	Archana; Sreejita	Priyanka; Sumbul	Nominated			Nimrit; Stan; Sumbul; Sreejita	Soundarya; Sumbul	Shalin; Shiv	Evicted (Day 118)			
Tina	Not eligible	Sajid; Stan	Nominated	Manya; Sumbul	Gautam	Walked (Day 33)	Safe	Soundarya	Ankit	Not eligible	Not eligible	House; Captain	Archana; Sreejita	Priyanka; Sumbul	Nominated			Nimrit; Stan; Sumbul; Sreejita	Soundarya; Sumbul	Walked (Day 114)	Evicted (Day 118)			
Soundarya	Not eligible	Abdu; Ankit	Safe	Sumbul; Manya	Shiv	Nimrit; Tina	Safe	Tina	Nominated	Shalin	Tina; Sumbul	House; Captain		Tina; Shalin	Nominated			Nimrit; Stan; Sumbul; Sreejita	Tina; Shalin	Evicted by Housemates (Day 112)				
Sajid	Not eligible	Shalin; Tina	Safe	Sumbul; Manya	Nimrit	Sumbul; Soundarya	Safe	House; King	Not eligible	Not eligible	Royal; Favourite	Priyanka; Tina; Shalin; Ankit	Vikkas; Sreejita	Tina; Shalin	Nominated			Nimrit; Stan; Sumbul; Sreejita	Walked (Day 106)					
Abdu	Not eligible	Shalin; Soundarya	Safe	Manya; Sumbul	Nimrit	Sumbul; Priyanka	House; Captain	Royal; Favourite	Not eligible	Not eligible	Not eligible	Did not nominate	Walked (Day 77)		Tina	Nimrit	House; Captain	Priyanka; Sajid; Shiv; Archana	Walked (Day 105)					
Sreejita	Not eligible	Tina; Gori	Nominated	Evicted (Day 13)								Tina	House; Captain	Banned	Sumbul		Priyanka	Tina; Shalin; Soundarya; Abdu	Evicted (Day 105)					
Vikkas	Not In House											Shiv; Nimrit	Archana; Sreejita	Banned	Evicted (Day 90)									
Ankit	Not eligible	Stan; Gori	Safe	Sumbul; Manya	Tina	Shalin; Archana	Safe	Not eligible	Nominated	Tina	House; King	Shiv; Nimrit	Nimrit; Shiv	Evicted by Housemates (Day 84)										
Gautam	Not eligible	Gori; Stan	~~House~~; ~~Captain~~	Sajid; Manya	Abdu	~~House~~; ~~Captain~~	Safe	Not eligible	Evicted (Day 48)															
Gori	Not eligible	Gautam; Ankit	Nominated	Sumbul; Manya	Not eligible	Shalin; Archana	Nominated	Evicted (Day 42)																
Manya	Not eligible	Gori; Stan	Safe	Sumbul; Soundarya	Evicted (Day 22)																			
Notes	1,2,3		5	5,6	7	8,9	None		10	10	10	None			11	None								12
Against Public Vote	Archana; Gautam; Sajid; Stan; Shiv		Gori; Shalin; Stan; Sreejita; Tina	Manya; Shalin; Sumbul	Abdu; Gautam; Gori; Nimrit; Soundarya; Shiv; Tina	Archana; Soundarya; Sumbul	Gori; Priyanka; Sumbul	Gauutam; Shalin; Soundarya; Tina	Archana; Ankit; Stan; Soundarya; Sumbul	Priyanka; Sajid; Shalin; Stan; Shiv; Sumbul; Tina	Nimirit; Stan; Sumbul; Tina	Sajid; Shalin; Shiv; Tina	Ankit; Sreejita; Tina; Vikkas	Nimrit; Priyanka; Shalin; Soundarya; Sreejita; ~~Sumbul~~; Tina; Vikkas	Archana; Sajid; Shalin; Soundarya; Sreejita; Sumbul; Tina			Nimrit; Stan; Sumbul; Sreejita	Shalin; Soundarya; Sumbul; Tina	Priyanka; Shalin; Shiv; Tina	Stan; Shiv; Sumbul	Archana; Nimrit; Priyanka; Shalin; Stan; Shiv	Archana; Priyanka; Shalin; Stan; Shiv	
Re-entered	None					Tina	None	Archana	None		Sreejita	Tina	Abdu	None						Tina	None			
Walked	None					Tina	None						Abdu	None					Abdu	None	Tina	None		
Walked	None					Tina	None						Abdu	None					Sajid	None	Tina	None		
Ejected	None						Archana	None																
Evicted	No; Eviction		Sreejita	Manya	No; Eviction		Gori	Gautam	No; Eviction		Tina	No; Eviction	Ankit	Vikkas	No; Eviction			Sreejita	Soundarya	Tina	Sumbul	Nimrit	Shalin	Archana
Evicted	No; Eviction		Sreejita	Manya	No; Eviction		Gori	Gautam	No; Eviction		Tina	No; Eviction	Ankit	Vikkas	No; Eviction			Sreejita	Soundarya	Tina	Sumbul	Nimrit	Priyanka	
Evicted	No; Eviction		Sreejita	Manya	No; Eviction		Gori	Gautam	No; Eviction		Tina	No; Eviction	Ankit	Vikkas	No; Eviction			Sreejita	Soundarya	Tina	Sumbul	Nimrit	MC	Shiv

Color Key

indicates the House Captain.
indicates the House King/Queen.
indicates the Royal Favourites.
indicates the Nominees for house captaincy.
indicates that the Housemate was directly nominated for eviction prior to the regular nominations process.
indicates that the housemate went to the secret room.
indicates that the housemate was granted immunity from nominations.
indicates the winner.
indicates the first runner up.
indicates the second runner up.
indicates the third runner up.
indicates the fourth runner up.
indicates that the contestant has re-entered the house.
indicates that the contestant walked out of the show.
indicates that the contestant was ejected out of the house.
indicates that the contestant was evicted.

=== Notes ===
- ^Note 1: As Nimrit was the first housemate to enter the Bigg Boss house, she was immediately assigned as the first House Captain by Bigg Boss.
- ^Note 2: Being the House Captain, Nimrit had the power to automatically nominate two contestants.
- ^Note 3: Gori won a task and saved herself from eviction.
- ^Note 4: Nimrit was fired from Captaincy but was allowed to fight for her position once again. Nimrit and Shalin competed in a task where Nimrit won back her Captaincy.
- ^Note 5: Shalin was nominated by Bigg Boss for two consecutive weeks as a punishment for physical violence.
- ^Note 6:Shiv was fired from Captaincy on Day 20 and Archana was made the new captain by Bigg Boss.
- ^Note 7: Archana was freed from Captaincy after her duration was completed.
- ^Note 8:Gautam was fired from Captaincy.
- ^Note 9: Tina briefly left the house on Day 33 due to the passing of her pet. She returned on the same day.
- ^Note 10: MC Stan was nominated by Bigg Boss for four consecutive weeks as a punishment for being physically violent against Shalin.
- ^Note 11: Priyanka was given choice by Bigg Boss to either save Ankit from on-the-spot eviction or get 25 lakh rupees of prize money back. Priyanka chose to save Ankit from eviction.
- ^Note 12: All 5 finalists were told to mutually evict one housemate and if the decision meets the audience's decision, 10 lakhs will be added to the prize money.
