= Khatron Ke Khiladi 13 =

Indian reality and stunt television series

Fear Factor: Khatron Ke Khiladi
- Season 13
- Native name: Iss Baar Har Level, Darr Next Level
- Starring: See Below
- Presented by: Rohit Shetty
- No. of contestants: 14
- Winner: Dino James
- Runner-up: Arjit Taneja
- No. of episodes: 27

Release
- Original network: Colors TV
- Original release: 15 July – 14 October 2023

Season chronology
- ← Previous; Season 12 Next → Season 14

Fear Factor: Khatron Ke Khiladi, Iss Baar Har Level, Darr Next Level is the thirteenth season of Fear Factor: Khatron Ke Khiladi, an Indian reality and stunt television series produced by Endemol Shine India. The show premiered from 15 July 2023 to 14 October 2023 on Colors TV and streams digitally on JioHotstar. The series is filmed in Cape Town, South Africa and is hosted by Rohit Shetty. The 27-episodes season was the longest since the inception of the series. Dino James emerged as the winner of the season, while Arjit Taneja became the 1st runner-up.

== Contestants ==
Contestant	Occupation	Status	Place	Ref.
Dino James	Rapper	Winner (Week 14)	1st	
Arjit Taneja	Actor	1st runner-up (Week 14)	2nd	
Aishwarya Sharma	Actress	2nd runner-up (Week 14)	3rd	
Rashmeet Kaur	Singer	3rd runner-up (Week 14)	4th	
Shiv thakare	Reality show alumni	4th Runner-Up (Week 14)	5th	
Archana Gautam	Model, actress	Eliminated (Week 13)	6th	
Nyrraa M Banerji	Actress	Eliminated (Week 13)	7th	
Soundous Moufakir	Model, dancer	Eliminated (Week 11)	8th	
Sheezan Khan	Actor	Eliminated (Week 10)	9th	
Daisy Shah	Actress	Eliminated (Week 6)	10th	
Daisy Shah	Actress	Eliminated (Week 8)	10th	
Anjum Fakih	Actress	Eliminated (Week 3)	11th	
Anjum Fakih	Actress	Eliminated (Week 7)	11th	
Anjali Anand	Actress	Eliminated (Week 4)	12th	
Rohit Roy	Actor	Quit (Week 2)	13th	
Ruhi Chaturvedi	Model, actress	Eliminated (Week 1)	14th	

Indicates original entrants
Indicates re-entered entrants

== Elimination chart ==
	Weeks																																																																						
	1				2									3						4							5			6			7				8											9			10			11			12				13									14	
	Grand Premiere				Red Funda Week^{1}									Partners Week^{4}						Relay Week^{6}							Rohit Shetty vs Khiladis^{8}			Undercover Agent Week^{10}			Target Week				Team Week											Abdu Rozik Week^{17}			Challenger Week^{18}						Ticket to Finale Week^{18}				Semi Finale Week^{21}									GRAND FINALE	
	Grand Premiere				Red Funda Week^{1}									Partners Week^{4}						Relay Week^{6}							Rohit Shetty vs Khiladis^{8}			Undercover Agent Week^{10}			Target Week				Team Week											Abdu Rozik Week^{17}			Faisal Sheikh			Divyanka Tripathi			Hina Khan				Semi Finale Week^{21}									GRAND FINALE	
	15-16 July				22-23 July									29 July		30 July				5-6 August							12-13 August			19-20 August			26-27 August				2-3 September											9-10 September			16-17 September			23-24 September			30 September		1 October		7-8 October									14 October	
Dino	LOST	SAFE					WIN							SHIV	WIN						WIN; NYRA & DAISY				SAFE		WIN			WIN			LOST	SAFE			^{15}	10	10	0	0	^{15}	20		TIE	SAFE		WIN			LOST	SAFE		WIN			FAIL		BLOCKED^{19}		30	10	30	0	0	WIN (70 Pts)		Finalist		WIN	WINNER
Arjit	WIN					WIN								SHEEZAN	LOST	SOUNDOUS^{5}	SAFE						LOST; ARCHANA		SAFE		WIN			LOST^{11}	SAFE		WIN				^{15}		0	0	10	^{15}	0		TIE	SAFE		LOST	SAFE		LOST	BTM2	SAFE	LOST	SAFE		WIN	FAIL	FAIL^{20}	FAIL	20	0	20	0	20	WIN (60 Pts)		Finalist		WIN	1st RUNNER-UP
Aishwarya	LOST	SAFE				LOST; RED FUNDA	LOST; RED FUNDA	SAFE						ANJUM	LOST	ANJUM	LOST	BTM2	SAFE						SAFE^{7}		FAIL	BTM2	SAFE	WIN			LOST	SAFE					10	0	0		20		TIE	SAVED		LOST	BTM2	SAFE	WIN			WIN			WIN	WIN^{19}	SAFE	WIN	Ticket To Finale									WIN	2nd RUNNER-UP
Rashmeet	LOST	SAFE									WIN			NYRA	WIN							LOST; SHEEZAN			SAFE		WIN			WIN^{11}			LOST	LOST	SAFE		^{15}	0	0	10	0		0	20	TIE	SAVED		LOST	SAFE		WIN			WIN			FAIL		BLOCKED^{19}		0	0	0	20	10	LOST (30)	BTM3	SAFE	Finalist	LOST	ELIMINATED
Shiv	WIN						WIN							DINO	WIN						LOST; ANJALI & RASHMEET				BTM2	SAFE	FAIL	BTM2	SAFE	LOST^{11}	SAFE^{11}		WIN					10	10	0	0		20	0	TIE	SAVED		WIN			LOST	SAFE		LOST	SAFE		FAIL		FAIL		0	0	0	30	30	WIN (60 Pts)		Finalist		LOST	ELIMINATED
Archana	LOST	SAFE							WIN					SOUNDOUS	LOST	SHEEZAN	LOST	SAFE						WIN	SAFE		WIN			LOST^{11}	BTM3	SAFE	WIN					0	0	10	0		0		TIE	BTM2	SAFE	LOST	SAFE		WIN			WIN			FAIL		FAIL^{20}	FAIL	10	20	0	10	0	LOST (40)	BTM3	ELIMINATED			
Nyra	LOST	SAFE						LOST; RED FUNDA	LOST; RED FUNDA	SAFE				RASHMEET	WIN					LOST					SAFE		WIN			LOST^{11}	BTM3^{13}	SAFE	TARGET^{14}		BTM2	SAFE			0	10	0	^{16}	20		TIE	SAVED		WIN			LOST	SAFE		LOST	BTM2	SAFE	WIN	FAIL	FAIL		0	30	10	0	0	LOST (40)	BTM3	ELIMINATED			
Soundous	WIN										WIN			ARCHANA	LOST	ARJIT^{5}	SAFE							LOST	SAFE; CODE RED		FAIL	SAFE^{9}		WIN			WIN					0	0	0	10		0		TIE	SAVED		LOST	BTM2	SAFE	WIN			LOST	BTM2	ELIMINATED															
Sheezan	LOST	LOST	SAFE						WIN					ARJIT	LOST	ARCHANA	LOST	SAFE					WIN; SOUNDOUS		SAFE		FAIL	SAFE		LOST	SAFE		LOST	LOST	SAFE			0	0	0	10		0	20	TIE	SAVED		WIN			LOST	BTM2	ELIMINATED																		
Daisy	LOST	SAFE			CODE RED; RED FUNDA	SAFE								ANJALI	WIN							WIN; ARJIT			SAFE		FAIL	SAFE^{9}		LOST	BTM3^{11}	ELIMINATED											20	0	TIE	BTM2	ELIMINATED																								
Anjum	LOST	LOST	BTM2	SAFE						WIN			LOST; RED FUNDA	AISHWARYA	LOST	AISHWARYA	LOST	BTM2	ELIMINATED								FAIL	SAFE		WIN^{12}			TARGET^{14}		BTM2	ELIMINATED																																			
Anjali	LOST	SAFE								LOST; RED FUNDA	LOST; RED FUNDA	BTM	SAFE	DAISY	WIN					LOST					BTM2	ELIMINATED																																													
Rohit	LOST	LOST	SAFE					WIN						QUIT^{3}																																																									
Ruhi	LOST	LOST	BTM2	ELIMINATED																																																																			

1. Red Fear Funda contestant will perform the stunts until he/she got rid of it. In the end whoever has the Red Fear Funda will be eliminated.
2. Anjali nominated Anjum to compete in the elimination stunt with herself.
3. Rohit had to quit the journey due to medical injury.
4. Pairs during Partner Week.
5. By winning the Code Red mini stunt, Soundous was allowed to switch her partner.
6. In Relay Week, Contestants will form a team by nominating a contestant for the next stunt. In the end, two contestants from team with most Fear Funda will perform the elimination stunt.
7. Aishwarya was in no team but was exempt from performing the elimination stunt by doing a correct prediction in Code Red.
8. If contestants win their stunts and manage to collect 10× before Rohit Shetty then there will be no elimination. If any contestant fails in their stunt then Rohit Shetty will earn a star.
9. Rohit Shetty allowed unsafe contestants to save two contestants among them by mutual decision.
10. The Undercover Agent is safe from elimination until his/her identity is discovered. He/she can give disadvantage to contestant during any stunt. Later, Shiv was revealed to be the Undercover Agent.
11. Stunt performed with an additional disadvantage.
12. Dino proxies Anjum due to health halt.
13. Undercover Agent nominated Nyra directly among unsafe contestants for the elimination stunt.
14. Anjum and Nyra were nominated as Target. They received Fear Funda and directly performed the second pre-elimination stunt.
15. Captains of respective teams: Blue Team, Red Team and Yellow Team.
  After the merger of Team Yellow & Team Red, Dino and Arjit remained the Captains of Team Blue and Team Yellow respectively.
16. Nyra was transferred from Team Yellow to Team Blue by Captain Arjit.
17. Abdu Rozik entered as a guest entrant.
18. Faisal Sheikh, Divyanka Tripathi Dahiya and Hina Khan entered as challengers. Faisal and Divyanka will set a challenge against the contestant who received Fear Funda while Hina will set a challenge against the contestant for the Ticket to Finale.
19. Aishwarya was allowed to choose two players who will not perform in the Ticket to Finale race. She chose Dino and Rashmeet.
20. Arjit and Archana performed better than their peers and were allowed to compete in the Ticket to Finale race.
21. In the semi-finale, all contestants will do the stunts together, First Best Performer will win 30 points, Second Best Performer will win 20 points, Third Best Performer will win 10 points. At the end of the week the three top contestants with the most points will go to the Finale and last three will perform the elimination stunt.

Winner
1st runner-up
2nd runner-up
Finalists
Ticket to finale
The contestant won the stunt.
The contestant lost the stunt and received Fear Funda.
The contestant got rid of Fear Funda by winning the pre-elimination stunt / Red Funda by performing better than his/her co-contestants.
The contestant was placed in the bottom and performed the elimination stunt.
The contestant was safe from elimination by winning the elimination stunt.
The contestant was eliminated.
The contestant did not perform the stunt.
The contestant was saved/exempt from performing the stunt.
The contestant failed to earn a vs Rohit Shetty / Failed in the Ticket to Finale Race.
Injury

== Code Red ==
Rohit Shetty introduced "Code Red" to the contestants revealing that it can change the dynamics of the game.

Week	Contestants Entered	Offer/Task	Result
Week 1	Shiv	Give up immunity of Week 1 to get a superpower in Week 2.	Rejected the offer
Week 1	Soundous	Give up immunity of Week 1 to get a superpower in Week 2.	Rejected the offer
Week 1	Arjit	Give up immunity of Week 1 to get a superpower in Week 2.	Rejected the offer
Week 2	Aishwarya	Name one contestant who won the tasks in Week 1 by fluke. Contestants named Daisy Shah.	Daisy got 'Red Funda'
Week 2	Anjali	Name one contestant who won the tasks in Week 1 by fluke. Contestants named Daisy Shah.	Daisy got 'Red Funda'
Week 2	Anjum	Name one contestant who won the tasks in Week 1 by fluke. Contestants named Daisy Shah.	Daisy got 'Red Funda'
Week 2	Archana	Name one contestant who won the tasks in Week 1 by fluke. Contestants named Daisy Shah.	Daisy got 'Red Funda'
Week 2	Arjit	Name one contestant who won the tasks in Week 1 by fluke. Contestants named Daisy Shah.	Daisy got 'Red Funda'
Week 2	Daisy	Name one contestant who won the tasks in Week 1 by fluke. Contestants named Daisy Shah.	Daisy got 'Red Funda'
Week 2	Dino	Name one contestant who won the tasks in Week 1 by fluke. Contestants named Daisy Shah.	Daisy got 'Red Funda'
Week 2	Nyra	Name one contestant who won the tasks in Week 1 by fluke. Contestants named Daisy Shah.	Daisy got 'Red Funda'
Week 2	Rashmeet	Name one contestant who won the tasks in Week 1 by fluke. Contestants named Daisy Shah.	Daisy got 'Red Funda'
Week 2	Rohit	Name one contestant who won the tasks in Week 1 by fluke. Contestants named Daisy Shah.	Daisy got 'Red Funda'
Week 2	Sheezan	Name one contestant who won the tasks in Week 1 by fluke. Contestants named Daisy Shah.	Daisy got 'Red Funda'
Week 2	Shiv	Name one contestant who won the tasks in Week 1 by fluke. Contestants named Daisy Shah.	Daisy got 'Red Funda'
Week 2	soundous	Name one contestant who won the tasks in Week 1 by fluke. Contestants named Daisy Shah.	Daisy got 'Red Funda'
Week 3	Soundous	Offered to change her partner for Week 3.	Accepted the offer
Week 3	Soundous	Choose a partner from the four contestants who got 'Fear Funda.'	She chose Arjit
Week 4	Soundous	Predict if Arjit or Sheezan will choose them in next stunt. If predictions would be correct then they will be saved from the Elimination Stunt. Archana and Soundous predicted that they both will be chosen while Aishwarya predicted she will not be chosen.	All three, Aishwarya, Archana and Soundous made correct predictions.
Week 4	Archana	Predict if Arjit or Sheezan will choose them in next stunt. If predictions would be correct then they will be saved from the Elimination Stunt. Archana and Soundous predicted that they both will be chosen while Aishwarya predicted she will not be chosen.	All three, Aishwarya, Archana and Soundous made correct predictions.
Week 4	Aishwarya	Predict if Arjit or Sheezan will choose them in next stunt. If predictions would be correct then they will be saved from the Elimination Stunt. Archana and Soundous predicted that they both will be chosen while Aishwarya predicted she will not be chosen.	All three, Aishwarya, Archana and Soundous made correct predictions.
Week 5	Archana	Choose any one option from the following three options- Option 1: If they won, they can save everyone from elimination. Option 2: If they lost, one from them will do elimination stunt. Option 3: If they denies to do Bonus stunt, then they all five are safe.	Chosen Option 3
Week 5	Nyra	Choose any one option from the following three options- Option 1: If they won, they can save everyone from elimination. Option 2: If they lost, one from them will do elimination stunt. Option 3: If they denies to do Bonus stunt, then they all five are safe.	Chosen Option 3
Week 5	Rashmeet	Choose any one option from the following three options- Option 1: If they won, they can save everyone from elimination. Option 2: If they lost, one from them will do elimination stunt. Option 3: If they denies to do Bonus stunt, then they all five are safe.	Chosen Option 3
Week 5	Arjit	Choose any one option from the following three options- Option 1: If they won, they can save everyone from elimination. Option 2: If they lost, one from them will do elimination stunt. Option 3: If they denies to do Bonus stunt, then they all five are safe.	Chosen Option 3
Week 5	Dino	Choose any one option from the following three options- Option 1: If they won, they can save everyone from elimination. Option 2: If they lost, one from them will do elimination stunt. Option 3: If they denies to do Bonus stunt, then they all five are safe.	Chosen Option 3
Week 6	Archana	Predict who is the undercover agent. If they predict correctly, the Undercover agent will perform the elimination stunt. If they predict wrong, any one of them will perform elimination stunt. They predicted Daisy Shah.	Prediction was incorrect
Week 6	Nyra	Predict who is the undercover agent. If they predict correctly, the Undercover agent will perform the elimination stunt. If they predict wrong, any one of them will perform elimination stunt. They predicted Daisy Shah.	Prediction was incorrect
Week 6	Shiv	Predict who is the undercover agent. If they predict correctly, the Undercover agent will perform the elimination stunt. If they predict wrong, any one of them will perform elimination stunt. They predicted Daisy Shah.	Prediction was incorrect
Week 6	Arjit	Predict who is the undercover agent. If they predict correctly, the Undercover agent will perform the elimination stunt. If they predict wrong, any one of them will perform elimination stunt. They predicted Daisy Shah.	Prediction was incorrect
Week 6	Sheezan	Predict who is the undercover agent. If they predict correctly, the Undercover agent will perform the elimination stunt. If they predict wrong, any one of them will perform elimination stunt. They predicted Daisy Shah.	Prediction was incorrect
Week 6	Daisy	Predict who is the undercover agent. If they predict correctly, the Undercover agent will perform the elimination stunt. If they predict wrong, any one of them will perform elimination stunt. They predicted Daisy Shah.	Prediction was incorrect
Week 7	Nyra	Choose any one option from the following two options- Option 1: Compete with each other. The winner will become safe. Option 2: Compete in team with Sheezan and Rashmeet. If they win, they are both safe and Sheezan and Rashmeet will go to the elimination stunt.	Chosen Option 2
Week 7	Anjum	Choose any one option from the following two options- Option 1: Compete with each other. The winner will become safe. Option 2: Compete in team with Sheezan and Rashmeet. If they win, they are both safe and Sheezan and Rashmeet will go to the elimination stunt.	Chosen Option 2
Week 8	Dino	Merge any two teams to compete against one team, scores of those two teams will also be merged.	Team Arjit & Team Rashmeet were merged. Arjit remains the captain.
Week 8	Rashmeet	Merge any two teams to compete against one team, scores of those two teams will also be merged.	Team Arjit & Team Rashmeet were merged. Arjit remains the captain.
Week 8	Arjit	Merge any two teams to compete against one team, scores of those two teams will also be merged.	Team Arjit & Team Rashmeet were merged. Arjit remains the captain.
Week 8	Arjit	Transfer any Contestant from Team Arjit to Team Dino.	Nyra was transferred from Team Arjit to Team Dino.

== Stunt matrix ==
Contestant	Grand Premiere				Red Fear Funda Week		Partner Week			Relay Week		Rohit Shetty vs Khiladis Week			Undercover Agent Week			Target Week			Team Week		Abdu Rozik Week			Challenger Weeks							Semi-Final Week	Grand Finale Week
Contestant	Grand Premiere				Red Fear Funda Week		Partner Week			Relay Week		Rohit Shetty vs Khiladis Week			Undercover Agent Week			Target Week			Team Week		Abdu Rozik Week			Faisal Sheikh			Divyanka Tripathi			Hina Khan	Semi-Final Week	Grand Finale Week
Contestant	15-16 July				22-23 July		29 July	30 July		5-6 August		12-13 August			19-20 August			26-27 August			2-3 September		9-10 September			16-17 September			23-24 September			30 September-1 October	7-8 October	14 October
Contestant	Premiere Stunt	Immunity	Pre-elimination	Elimination	Red Funda	Elimination	Immunity	Pre-elimination	Elimination	Immunity	Elimination	Immunity	Pre-elimination	Elimination	Immunity	Pre-elimination	Elimination	Immunity	Pre-elimination	Elimination	Immunity	Elimination	Immunity	Pre-elimination	Elimination	Star Player	Pre-elimination	Elimination	Star Player	Pre-elimination	Elimination	Ticket to Finale		
Aishwarya	Height	Height			Height		Animal & Shock	Height & Water	Water	CODE RED		Animal	Vehicle	Shock & Animal	Water & Animal			Height & Shock	Animal				Height & Vehicle	Water & Animal	Water	Animal			Fire			Height	Ticket To Finale	
Archana	Height	Animal			Animal		Height	Height & Water		Height		Height			Water & Animal	Height	Water	Height & Shock			Height	Dark & Animal	Dark & Animal	Water & Animal		Height			Vehicle & Height			Height		
Arjit	Height				Height		Vehicle	Height & Water		Height		Height			Height	Vehicle		Height & Shock					Water & Animal	Height		Height	Vehicle	Height & Shock	Vehicle & Height	Height		Vehicle		
Dino	Height	Height			Water		Animal			Vehicle & Height		Animal			Height			Height	Shock & Ice		Height		Height & Vehicle			Water	Water		Water			Vehicle		
Nyra	Height	Animal			Animal		Height			Water		Animal			Water	CODE RED	Water	TARGET		Animal			Dark & Animal			Animal	Water		Fire	Animal	Height & Shock	Vehicle		
Rashmeet	Height	Animal			Height		Height			Animal		Height			Height			Height	Animal		Height		Height & Vehicle	Height		Height			Vehicle & Height			Vehicle		
Shiv	Height				Water		Vehicle			Vehicle & Height	Shock	Height	Vehicle	Shock & Animal	Water & Animal	Height		Height			Height		Water & Animal			Height	Vehicle		Vehicle & Height	Height		Height		
Soundous	Height				Height		Height	Height & Water		Height		Water			Water			Height			Height		Dark & Animal	Height	Water	Water			Water	Animal	Height & Shock	ELIMINATED		
Sheezan	Height	Animal	Vehicle		Animal		Animal	Height & Water		Height		Vehicle & Height	Vehicle		Water	Height		Height & Shock	Shock & Ice		Height		Dark & Animal			Water	Water	Height & Shock	ELIMINATED					
Daisy	Height	Animal			Height		Animal & Shock			Animal		Vehicle & Height			Height	Vehicle	Water	ELIMINATED				Dark & Animal	ELIMINATED											
Anjum	Height	Height	Vehicle	Animal	Animal	Water	Animal & Shock	Height & Water	Water	ELIMINATED		Water	Vehicle		Water & Animal			TARGET		Animal	ELIMINATED													
Anjali	Height	Animal			Animal	Water	Animal & Shock			Water	Shock	ELIMINATED																						
Rohit	Height	Animal	Vehicle		Animal		QUIT																											
Ruhi	Height	Height	Vehicle	Animal	ELIMINATED																													

indicates contestant won their immunity / pre-elimination / Red 'Fear Funda' stunt / in winning team / Failed in Ticket to Finale and did not perform in the following stunt.

== Episodes ==
No.	Title	Original release date
1	"Mega Premiere: Darr Next Level"	15 July 2023
2	"Code Red and a shock for Khiladis"	16 July 2023
3	"What's The Red Fanda?"	22 July 2023
4	"Unexpected Khatra in the Wild"	23 July 2023
5	"Daisy faces terror"	29 July 2023
6	"The water puzzle!"	30 July 2023
7	"Nyra goes underwater"	5 August 2023
8	"Arjit faces the Tarzan stunt"	6 August 2023
9	"Khiladi Boss vs Bigg Boss!"	12 August 2023
10	"Rohit's hazardous challenge!"	13 August 2023
11	"An underwater stunt!"	19 August 2023
12	"The Khiladis get into an argument"	20 August 2023
13	"Rohit stuns the Khiladis"	26 August 2023
14	"Sheezan experiences claustrophobia"	27 August 2023
15	"Khiladis elect their captain"	2 September 2023
16	"Code Red is back!"	3 September 2023
17	"Abdu Rozik joins the show!"	9 September 2023
18	"Arjit-Soundous' risky stunt"	10 September 2023
19	"Stars vs Khiladis"	16 September 2023
20	"Shiv competes against Faisal"	17 September 2023
21	"A dynamic fire stunt!"	23 September 2023
22	"Nyra vs Soundous"	24 September 2023
23	"A battle on a moving truck!"	30 September 2023
24	"Aishwarya acquires a power!"	1 October 2023
25	"Hang in there, Archana!"	7 October 2023

== Production ==
=== Casting ===
In February 2023, Rohit Shetty entered the Bigg Boss 16 house and selected Shalin Bhanot as the first contestant for the upcoming season, but he declined.

In May 2023, it was reported that Abdu Rozik would join the series as Guest.

In June 2023, Divyanka Tripathi, Hina Khan and Faisal Shaikh were approached to be a part of the series as Challengers.

=== Development ===
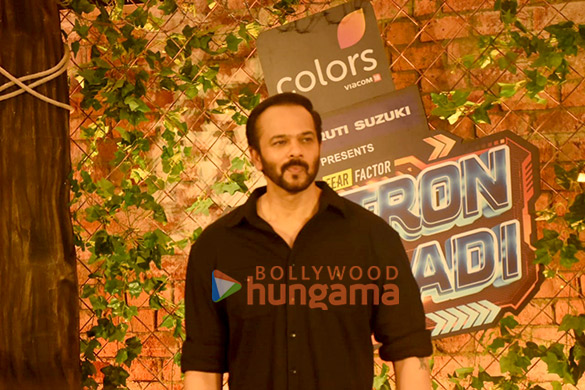
Shetty during Launch

The contestants were spotted at the Mumbai Airport before leaving for South Africa on 11 May 2023. Shetty was spotted leaving for South Africa on 16 May 2023.

The series was announced by Colors TV on 23 May 2023.

Divyanka Tripathi was spotted at Mumbai Airport before leaving for Cape Town on 20 June 2023.

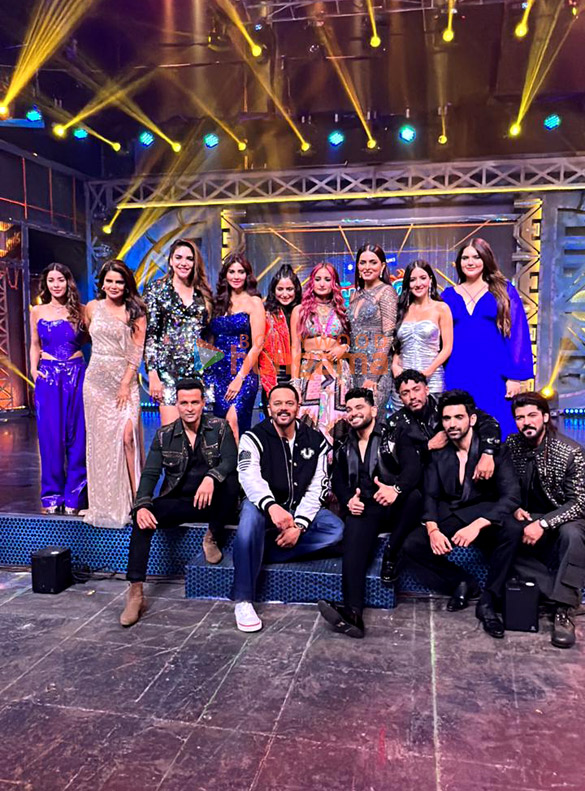
Shetty snapped with the contestants during Grand Finale

The contestants were spotted at the Mumbai Airport after returning from Cape Town, South Africa on 5 July 2023.

=== Filming ===
The principal photography of the series began on 20 May 2023 in South Africa. Rohit Shetty took to his Instagram to officially announce the same.

On 3 July 2023, Rohit Shetty announced the wrap up of "Khatron Ke Khiladi 13" in Cape Town after 50 days schedule.

The contestants reunited for the finale episode shooting held on 2 October 2023 in Film City, Mumbai.

== Reception ==
Times Now wrote, "As expected, the episode started with a bang. But, later it turned annoying and boring."

== See also ==
- List of programmes broadcast by Colors TV
