= Archana Gautam =

Indian actress, model (born 1995)

- Gautam in 2023
- Born: 1994 or 1995 (age 31–32); Meerut, Uttar Pradesh, India
- Occupations: Actress; politician; model
- Years active: 2016–present
- Known for: Bigg Boss 16
- Title: Miss Uttar Pradesh 2014; Miss Bikini India 2018; Miss Cosmo India 2018; Miss Talent World 2018
- Website: archanagautam.in

Archana Gautam (born 1994 or 1995) is an Indian actress, politician, model and beauty pageant title holder who primarily works in Indian television and movies. Gautam was crowned as Miss Uttar Pradesh 2014, and represented India at Miss Cosmos World 2018. She is best known for participation in reality shows like, Bigg Boss 16, Khatron Ke Khiladi 13, Celebrity Masterchef India, Reality Ranis of the Jungle and The 50.

== Early life ==
Gautam was born in Meerut, Uttar Pradesh. She has completed her studies in Mass Communication from her town.

== Acting career ==
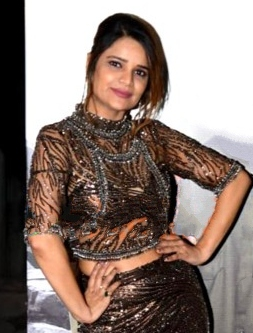
Gautam in 2023

She was awarded the title of Miss Uttar Pradesh in 2014. She has won Miss Bikini India 2018 and represented India at Miss Bikini Universe 2018. Gautam also represented India in Miss Cosmos 2018 held at Malaysia and won sub title of Most Talent 2018. and also Miss Bikini India in 2018.

From October 2022 to February 2023, she was seen as a participant in the Colors TV's reality show Bigg Boss 16, where she finished as the 3rd runner-up. Next she was seen participating in the stunt-based reality show Fear Factor: Khatron Ke Khiladi 13. She has been seen in multiple music videos and was a participant in the show Celebrity MasterChef India 2025.

== Political career ==
She joined Indian National Congress in November 2021 and got a ticket from Hastinapur (Assembly constituency) for 2022 Uttar Pradesh Legislative Assembly election. She was among the 8 candidates from this constituency. She lost the seat to BJP candidate Dinesh Khatik who won 107,587 votes, while Gautam received only 1,519 votes.

In 2023, Gautam was assaulted along with her father, when she tried to enter Indian National Congress office in New Delhi to congratulate Mallikarjun Kharge and Priyanka Gandhi in the context of women reservation bill in Lok Sabha. Gautam alleged personal assistant of Priyanka Gandhi, Sandeep Kumar of harassing her with death threats. She also alleged that women worker of Congress party office physically assaulted her and she had to escape from there to save her life. It was reported that her driver was also assaulted along with her father and her.

== Filmography ==
=== Films ===
Year	Title	Role	Language	Notes
2016	Great Grand Masti	Gaav ki Gori (Uncredited)	Hindi	Cameo
2017	Haseena Parkar	Salma	Hindi	Cameo
2017	Baaraat Company	Anita Bhardwaj	Hindi	Cameo

=== Television ===
Year	Title	Role	Notes	Ref.
2022–2023	Bigg Boss 16	Contestant	3rd Runner-Up	
2023	Entertainment Ki Raat Housefull	Herself		
2023	Fear Factor: Khatron Ke Khiladi 13	Contestant	6th Place	
2024	Laughter Chefs – Unlimited Entertainment	Herself		
2025	Celebrity MasterChef India	Contestant	6th Place	
2025	Reality Ranis of the Jungle 2	Contestant	Runner-Up	
2026	The 50	Contestant	Semi Finalist	
2026	Indian Game Show	Herself		

=== Music videos ===
Year	Title	Singer	Language	Ref.
2018	Haale Dil	Apeksha Dandekar	Hindi	
2019	Beinteha	Altaaf Sayyed	Hindi	
2020	Saans	Sandeep Surila	Haryanvi	
2020	Eyeliner	Gaggu Daad	Punjabi	
2020	Dynamite	Shubhankit Sharma	Hindi	
2020	Nasha Zyada	Lovesta, Chirag Bhatia	Hindi	
2020	Buggu Oye	Navjeet, Nitika Jain	Punjabi	
2023	AC Lagwde	Ranveer Singh Malik, Kavita Shobu	Haryanvi	
2024	Kaysi Doori	Padmalatha Ramanand	Hindi	
2024	Ankhiyon Da Noor	Altamash Faridi, Shalini Mamgain	Hindi	
2025	Tujhe Bhula Dia	Amit Mishra	Hindi	

== Pageants ==
Year	Title	Place	Location	Notes	Ref.
2014	Miss Uttar Pradesh	Winner	Lucknow		
2018	Miss Bikini India	Winner	Mangalore		
2018	Miss Bikini Universe India	Winner	Bangalore		
2018	Miss Bikini Universe	Participant	China		
2018	Miss Cosmos India 2018	Winner	Bangalore		
2018	Miss Cosmos World 2018	Participant	Malaysia	Won Most Talent 2018	
