= Love U Zindagi =

- Genre: Drama
- Starring: See below
- Opening theme: "Love U Zindagi" by Mohammed Irfan
- Country of origin: India
- Original language: Hindi
- No. of seasons: 1
- No. of episodes: 46

Production
- Camera setup: Multi-camera
- Running time: 24 minutes
- Production company: Shreya Creations

Original release
- Network: STAR Plus
- Release: 29 January – 10 July 2011

Love U Zindagi - Geet Ke Funde is an Indian television series which premiered on 29 January 2011 on STAR Plus. The series is based on the story of Rahul, a broken hearted scion of an industrialist family and Geet, a young, bold and bubbly girl. The story is set in a Punjabi backdrop, and is loosely based on the Shahid Kapoor and Kareena Kapoor starrer Jab We Met.

== About the show ==
The show is the about the romance of two individuals who are complete opposites. Rahul is a broken hearted scion of an industrialist family who is escaping from life itself. Geet is a Sikhni from Bhatinda with a zest for life, and who lives for the moment. The young couple meet each other on the Punjab Mail train and begin the memorable journey of their lives first from Bombay, to Bhatinda, then to Manali.

== Cast ==
=== Main ===
- Sidharth Shukla as Rahul Kashyap
- Pavitra Punia as Geet Dhillon

=== Recurring ===
- Aleeza Khan as Roop Dhillon
- Navina Bole as Manjeet
- Pavan Malhotra as Daljeet
- Neelu Kohli as Parmeet
- Surendra Pal as Daarji
- Karaan Singh as Kunal Sood
- Shivani Gosain as Vimmi Bua
- Sonia Kapoor as Rahul's mother
- Ajay Sharma as Harsimran
- Heli Daruwala as Neha
- Sakshi Batra as Preeto
- Abhidnya Bhave as Samyukta
- Shraddha Musale as Joanna
- Lorde as Amanpreet
- Jitendra Trehan as Geet's father
- Akhlaque Khan as Nikhil
- Priyanka Khandale as Resho
