= Pavitra Punia =

Indian television actress (born 1986)

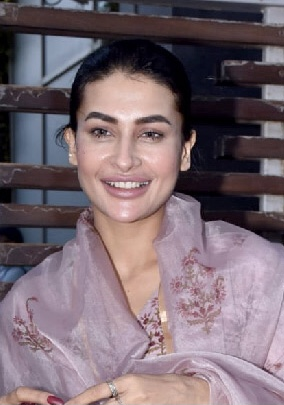
- Punia in 2021
- Born: Neha Singh; 22 April 1986 (age 40); Uttar Pradesh, India
- Occupation: Actress
- Years active: 2009–present
- Known for: Baalveer Returns

Neha Singh (born 22 April 1986), known by her stage name Pavitra Punia, is an Indian actress. She is known for playing Geet Dhillon in Love U Zindagi and an evil fairy named Timnasa in the sitcom fantasy series Baalveer Returns. She participated in the reality shows MTV Splitsvilla 3 in 2009 and Bigg Boss 14 in 2020.

== Career ==
Pavitra Punia started her career with the MTV's reality show MTV Splitsvilla 3 In 2010, she made her acting debut with the show Geet – Hui Sabse Parayi playing the role of Dalljiet. Thereafter, she got her first lead role in the Star Plus's show Love U Zindagi, opposite Sidharth Shukla. She was also a part of the Life OK's reality show Welcome – Baazi Mehmaan Nawazi Ki.

She then acted in the Mukul Mishra-directed movie Siddhartha - Love, Lust, Peace, which stars Mahesh Bhatt, Shivam Bhaargava and Shazahn Padamsee. Punia has also been a part of other shows including Ritz Jeele Yeh Pal, MTV Making The Cut 2, Hongey Judaa Na Hum, Sawaare Sabke Sapne Preeto and Darr Sabko Lagta Hai. She portrayed the role of the lead antagonist Niddhi Chhabra in the Star Plus's show Yeh Hai Mohabbatein. She also played the role of Karuna in TV's Gangaa. She also played a shape-shifting snake for a maha episode in Zee Tv's Kaleerein. Then she played Poulomi Roy in Colors TV's Naagin 3. she portrayed the role of an evil fairy named Timnasa in Sony SAB's sitcom fantasy series Baalveer Returns.

In October 2020, Punia entered the Bigg Boss Season 14 house as a contestant. She was evicted from the show on day 57.

== Personal life ==
Punia got engaged to businessman Sumit Maheshwari in October 2015; however as reported no marriage took place subsequently. In 2020, Maheshwari claimed in the media that he is married to Punia and that she cheated on him with multiple men. Maheshwari was backed by actor Paras Chhabra, whom Punia had dated briefly in 2018. According to Chhabra, she hid her marital status from him, and he broke up with her once he got to know she is married.

Punia did not directly address any of the claims made by Maheshwari and Chhabra, and said in a media interaction, "All I can say is, it's good to ride on someone's limelight." Punia was also in a relationship with actor Pratik Sehajpal (of Bigg Boss 15 fame), who later publicly accused her of being possessive.

Punia later dated Bigg Boss 14 fellow contestant Eijaz Khan and was engaged in 2022, but the two parted ways due to undisclosed reasons in 2024.

In October 2025, Punia announced her engagement to a Mumbai-based businessman, posting photographs from the ceremony. The fiancé has not been publicly named and is reported to be outside the entertainment industry.

== Filmography ==
=== Television ===
Year	Show	Role	Ref
2009	MTV Splitsvilla 3	Contestant	
2010	MTV Making The Cut 2	Contestant	
2010	Geet – Hui Sabse Parayi	Dalljiet	
2011	Jeele Yeh Pal	Contestant	
2011	Love U Zindagi	Geet Dhillon	
2011–2012	Sawaare Sabke Sapne Preeto	Simran Ahluwalia	
2012–13	Hongey Judaa Na Hum	Anushka	
2013	Welcome – Baazi Mehmaan Nawazi Ki	Contestant	
2014–2015	Box Cricket League 1	Contestant	
2015	Darr Sabko Lagta Hai	Episodic Role	
2016–2017	Yeh Hai Mohabbatein	Nidhi	
2016	Box Cricket League 2	Contestant	
2016	Kavach... Kaali Shaktiyon Se	Ritu	
2018	Box Cricket League 3	Contestant	
2018	Kaleerein	Vishkanya	
2018	Naagin 3	Poulomi Roy	
2018–2019	Daayan	Chandrika	
2019	Box Cricket League 4	Contestant	
2019–2021	Baalveer Returns	Timnasa	
2020	Aladdin – Naam Toh Suna Hoga	Guest (as Timnasa)	
2020	Kuch Smiles Ho Jayein... With Alia	Guest (as Timnasa)	
2020	Bigg Boss 14	Contestant (Evicted on day 57)	
2022–2023	Ishq Ki Dastaan - Naagmani	Mohini	
2024	Reality Ranis of the Jungle Season 1	Contestant; 4th Place	
2025	Reality Ranis of the Jungle Season 2	Guest, Episodes 18-20	
2025	Tenali Rama	Vishkanya / Laila	
