= Soundarya Sharma =

Indian actress (born 1994)

- Born: 20 September 1994 (age 32); New Delhi, India
- Occupation: Actress
- Years active: 2017–present

Soundarya Sharma (born 20 September 1994) is an Indian actress. She made her acting debut with the romantic drama Ranchi Diaries in 2017. In 2022, she participated in Bigg Boss 16. She also appeared in the 2025 film Housefull 5.

== Early life ==
Soundarya Sharma was born on 20 September 1994, in Preet Vihar, East Delhi, India. She was passionate about theatre, which led her to join the National School of Drama and the ACT 1 Theatre group.

== Career ==
Sharma played the lead role in the film Ranchi Diaries, which was produced by Anupam Kher and Rashmin Majithia. The film was released in October 2017, and she was nominated for the 'Best Female Debutant' by Zee Cine Awards and Star Screen Awards. She won the 'Best Debutante' at the Jharkhand International Film Festival. She won the Lokmat Most Stylish Diva Award at Lokmat Stylish Awards in 2018. Soundarya was also a part of a Times Music exclusive release titled Garmi Mein Chill.

She did a workshop with Lee Strasberg Theatre and Film Institute and a short-acting course from the New York Film Academy. In 2022, she was seen in MX Player's crime web series Raktanchal 2 playing Roli. She was also seen in Colors TV's reality show Bigg Boss 16. On Day 112, she was evicted, where she finished at 9th place.

== Filmography ==
=== Films ===
| Year | Title | Role | Notes | Ref. |
|---|---|---|---|---|
| 2015 | Meeruthiya Gangsters | Alka | | |
| 2017 | Ranchi Diaries | Gudiya | | |
| 2022 | Thank God | Tanya | Cameo | |
| 2025 | Housefull 5 | Lucy | | |

=== Television ===
| Year | Title | Role | Notes | Ref. |
|---|---|---|---|---|
| 2022–2023 | Bigg Boss 16 | Contestant | 9th place | |
| 2022 | Raktanchal 2 | Roli | | |
| 2022 | Country Mafia | Nannu | | |
| 2022 | Karm Yuddh | Payal Rana | | |

=== Music videos ===
| Year | Title | Singer(s) | Ref. |
|---|---|---|---|
| 2021 | "Mast Barsaat" | Sajid Khan, Danish Sabri | |
| 2022 | "Bomb Hai" | RaKa | |
| 2023 | "Bade Din Se" | Muskaan, Altamash Faridi | |
| 2023 | "Khoobsurat" | Neha Kakkar, Raghav Chaitanya | |

== Awards and nominations ==
| Year | Award | Category | Work | Result | Ref. |
|---|---|---|---|---|---|
| 2018 | Zee Cine Awards | Best Female Debut | Ranchi Diaries | Nominated | |
| 2018 | Star Screen Awards | Best Female Debut | Ranchi Diaries | Nominated | |
| 2018 | Jharkhand International Film Festival | Best Debutante | Ranchi Diaries | Won | |
| 2018 | Lokmat Stylish Awards | Most Stylish Diva | —N/a | Won | |

== See also ==
- List of Indian film actresses
