= Abdu Rozik =

Tajikistani singer (born 2003)

- Абдурозиқ Савриқул Муҳаммадрозиқӣ
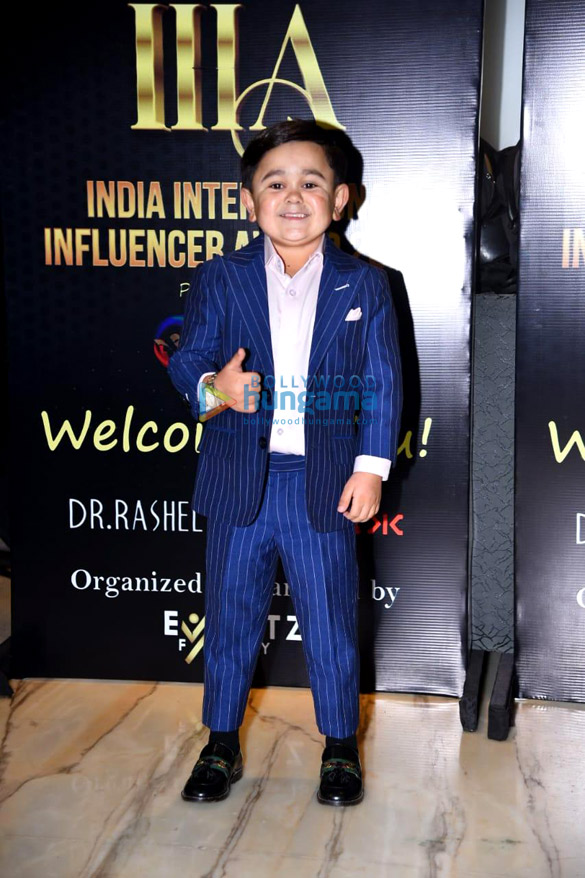
- Rozik in 2022
- Born: Abdurozik Savriqul Muhammadroziqi; 23 September 2003 (age 22); Gizhdarva, Panjakent, Tajikistan
- Occupations: Singer; boxer; influencer
- Years active: 2019–present
- Known for: Bigg Boss 16
- Height: 115 cm (3 ft 9 in)

Abdurozik Savriqul Muhammadroziqi (Tajik: Абдурозиқ Савриқул Муҳаммадрозиқӣ, [æbdurɑˈzɯq sævrɯˈqul muˌɦæmːædrɑzɯˈqiː], born 23 September 2003), known professionally as Abdu Rozik, is a Tajikistani playback singer and social media influencer based in Dubai, UAE. In 2022, he participated in Bigg Boss 16 and later in Laughter Chefs – Unlimited Entertainment 2.

== Early life ==
As a child, Rozik was diagnosed with dwarfism, a growth hormone deficiency which could be cured with appropriate medical treatment. However, his family could not afford to have him treated, leading to his stunted growth.

Due to his family's poverty, Rozik was often out of school. He sang for tips in markets and on streets of Panjakent in Tajikistan; along with his family, Rozik also had a beloved pet cat named Renzo, a British Shorthair, who brought him a lot of joy during difficult times.

== Career ==
Beginning in 2019, Rozik received mentorship and financial support from Tajikistani rapper-blogger Baron (Behruz). Baron even convinced Rozik's father to let Rozik pursue singing. After getting permission, Rozik and Baron moved to Dubai, UAE.

Rozik sang various Tajikistani songs like Ohi Dili Zor, Chaki Chaki Boron and Modar. In 2021, he uploaded a video of him singing the Hindi song Enna Sona by Arijit Singh. In 2022, he was invited to attend the 22nd IIFA Awards ceremony in Abu Dhabi, United Arab Emirates, where he sang the Hindi song "Ek Ladki Ko Dekha Toh Aisa Laga" from the 1994 film 1942: A Love Story. He dedicated the song to Salman Khan.

In 2021, he challenged Russian MMA fighter and media personality Hasbulla Magomedov, who also has dwarfism, to a fight, but the Russian Dwarf Athletic Association (RDAA) did not approve, calling it unethical.

In October 2022, he participated in Bigg Boss, before which he acted in the Hindi film Kisi Ka Bhai Kisi Ki Jaan. In 2023, he joined Fear Factor: Khatron Ke Khiladi 13 as a guest entrant.

== Filmography ==
=== Television ===
Year	Title	Role	Notes	Ref.
2022–2023	Bigg Boss 16	Contestant	Quit	
2023	Entertainment Ki Raat Housefull	Himself	Guest	
2023	Bigg Boss OTT 2	Himself	Guest	
2023	Pyar Ka Pehla Naam: Radha Mohan	Chota Bhaijaan	Guest	
2023	Fear Factor: Khatron Ke Khiladi 13	Himself	Guest	
2023	Playground	Himself	Guest	
2025	Laughter Chefs – Unlimited Entertainment	Himself	Season 2	

== Discography ==
Year	Title	Ref.
2022	Chota Bhaijaan	
2023	Pyar	

== Controversies ==
In July 2025, Rozik was detained at Dubai International Airport over alleged theft charges.
