= Karm Yuddh =

- Genre: Crime drama
- Written by: Rehan Khan; Ravi Adhikari; Sarim Momin
- Directed by: Ravi Adhikari
- Starring: Ashutosh Rana Anjana Sukhani Chandan Roy Sanyal Paoli Dam Rajesh Khattar Rituraj Singh Satish Kaushik
- Country of origin: India
- Original language: Hindi
- No. of seasons: 1
- No. of episodes: 8

Production
- Producers: Gautam Adhikari; Ravi Adhikari; Kailashnath Adhikari
- Cinematography: Sunita Radia
- Running time: 29–47 minutes
- Production company: Happi Digital

Original release
- Network: Disney+ Hotstar
- Release: 30 September 2022

Karm Yuddh is a Hindi-language television series written by Rehan Khan, directed by Ravi Adhikari, starring Satish Kaushik, Ashutosh Rana, Paoli Dam, Anjana Sukhani, Sachin Parikh, Pranay Pachauri, Ankit Bisht, Tara Alisha Berry, Madhurima Roy, Soundharya Sharma, Sabyasachi Chakraborty, Satyajit Sharma, Faizal Rashid, Satyadeep Mishra, Ashit Chatterjee, Rajesh Khattar and Nitin Merani.

== Plot ==
A family-revenge drama with an emphasis on the "Roy" family, the web series tells its story through its characters. The chairmanship of the Roy Group of Industries is up for grabs in a power battle between two individuals. How far will the contestants go when their aspirations are so high?

== Cast ==
- Ashutosh Rana as Guru Shastri
- Satish Kaushik as Bhisham Roy
- Rajesh Khattar as Vardhaan Roy
- Paoli Dam as Indrani Roy
- Soundarya Sharma as Payal Rana
- Rituraj Singh as Viral Motvani
- Chandan Roy Sanyal as Aadesh Baghchi
- Satyajit Sharma as Iqbal Singh Bajwa
- Tara Alisha Berry as Fiza Ayubi
- Madhurima Roy as Hunar Agarwal
- Anjana Sukhani as Mounisha
- Pranay Pachauri as Samar Shastri
- Ankit Bisht as Abhimanyu Roy
- Akash Dhar as Saahas Allu
- Kundan Roy as Local CBI
- Rajneesh Sharma as Local CBI
- Nitin Mirani as Raghuveer Singh
- Shruti Chauhan as Rashi Motvani
- Malkhan Singh Gaur as Factory Fire Survivor
- Aashit Chatterjee as Kannu Sudarshan
- Sachin Parikh as Debashish, Bhisham's PA
- Gavin Methalaka as George Masih
- Pranay Narayan as Gajanand Agarwal, Hunar's Father
- Reshma Merchant as Maitri Agarwal, Hunar's Mother
- Atharv Padhye as Ninad Agarwal, Hunar's Brother
- Radhika Chauhan as Radhika, Hunar's Friend
- Amy Aela as Isabelle
- Utkarsh Kohli as Tapish
- Vishnu Sharma as Indrani's Father, Ex-Police Commissioner
- Pragya Mishra as Naxalite
- Sudhakar Gaonkar as Naxalite
- Manish Kumar as Naxalite
- Madhu Awasthi as Naxalite

== Release ==
Karm Yuddh was released on 30 September 2022 on Disney+ Hotstar.

== Reception ==
Poorna Banerjee of The Times of India rated the web series 2.5 stars out of 5 and wrote "The lack of cohesiveness or believability also leaves one with plenty of loose ends that the director seems to ignores as long as his purpose is served."

Manik Sharma of Firstpost wrote "The show’s biggest problem isn’t that it has a predictable done-to-death template, but the fact that it can’t even stay true to the Succession-esque powergrab at the heart of the show."

Bhawana Bisht of SheThePeople wrote "Interestingly, the show is not just a revenge drama, it also serves as a love story connecting dots where Abhimanyu Roy pursues a girl (played by Madhurima Roy) consistently, and even molests her, making her eventually fall in love with him, but that angle doesn’t work much because of its drag and the fact that the audience is far beyond romanticising stalking on screen."

Archi Sengupta of Leisurebyte rated 2 out of 5 stars and wrote "We sit there, episode after episode, getting a minute or two of the interesting stuff while watching silly things happen for hours on end. Especially in this Abhimanyu Roy storyline – we see him being an entitled molester, creep and stalker, all the while romantic music plays in the back."

Sunidhi Prajapat of OTTplay rated 3.5 stars out of 5 and wrote "The Naxal angle, which appears to be an unnecessary approach by the makers to make it even more intense and suspenseful, This angle surely makes the show longer, which feels like a stretch after a while. However, the impressive performances of most of the actors balance out the show."
