= Hasbulla =

Russian internet personality (born 2002)

- Хасбулла
- Born: Hasbulla Magomedovich Magomedov; 7 July 2002 (age 24); Makhachkala, Dagestan, Russia
- Other names: Hasbi; Hasbik; Mini Khabib; Habibi
- Years active: 2021–present
- Known for: Dwarfism; combat sports collaborations
- Height: 102 cm (3 ft 4 in)
- Website: hasbulla.com

Hasbulla Magomedovich Magomedov (Note: Russian: Хасбулла Магомедович Магомедов, IPA: [xəzbʊˈla məɡɐˈmʲedəvʲɪtɕ məɡɐˈmʲedəf].) (born 7 July 2002), simply known as Hasbulla or Hasbik, (Note: Russian: Хасбик, IPA: [ˈxazbʲɪk].) is a Russian social media personality. Recognizable for his dwarfism – he is 102 centimeters (3 feet 4 inches) tall – caused by a growth hormone deficiency, Hasbulla first gained fame in 2021 due to a viral TikTok video, and has since made collaborations with high-profile mixed martial arts and combat sports fighters and other sports personalities. These include Khabib Nurmagomedov, Islam Makhachev, Jon Jones, Alexander Volkanovski, Dana White, Mike Tyson, Mark Wahlberg, Shaquille O'Neal and the Nelk Boys.

== Early and personal life ==
Hasbulla was born and raised in Makhachkala, in the Republic of Dagestan, Russia, and is the son of Magomed Magomedov, a plumber. He is a Muslim and of Dargin ethnicity. His informal interpreter, Surkhay Sungurov, said that Hasbulla convinced a friend to drive two hundred kilometers (120 mi) to help him escape school. Once he left, he began creating videos for the internet.

He has a form of dwarfism caused by a growth hormone deficiency and stands at 102 cm (3 ft 4 in) tall, weighing 20 kg (44.1 lb). His form of dwarfism is unknown, as he stated that doctors have never given him a definitive diagnosis. The New York Times wrote that he is passionate about "shooting guns, driving fast cars, practicing fighting moves, and playing pranks."

== Career ==
One of Hasbulla's first viral videos shows him driving a motorized scooter and lecturing a young person on a bicycle about pandemic restrictions, telling him to go home. In another video, Hasbulla was eating strawberries. During 2021 and 2022, he had a satirical publicized dispute with Tajikistani social media influencer Abdu Rozik and Uzbek Erali.

In September 2022, Hasbulla signed a five-year promotional contract with the UFC. In March 2023, he toured the United States with Nelk.
