= Sarim Momin =

Indian writer

- Born: 10 December 1978 (age 47); Mumbai, India
- Occupations: Lyrics writer and Filmmaker
- Years active: 2005–present
- Spouse: Gauri Karnik (m. 2010)

Sarim Momin (Urdu: صارم مومن; born 10 December 1978 in Mumbai, India), is a filmmaker, writer, and lyricist for many Bollywood movies. His written work includes Ram Gopal Varma's Sarkar, Sholay (Aag), Darling, EMI, Go, Shabri & D, Bhagam Bhaag, Hide and Seek, The Film, Agyaat, and Rann.

His unreleased feature film ARZI won the awards for Best Picture, Best Actor and Best Actress at the Hollywood International Moving Pictures Film Festival in Los Angeles.

His upcoming films as a Writer-Director include KHABEES which has been announced. and HAWA SINGH starring Sooraj Pancholi

His last lyrical work was released with Lucky Ali on his new album Raasta-Man.

Sarim Momin was nominated as the "Best Lyricist" for the Indian Television Academy Awards, 2012.

He turned a filmmaker (Writer & Director) with his debut feature film ARZI which won three Awards at the Hollywood International Moving Pictures Film Festival, Los Angeles including 'Best Picture', 'Best Actress', and 'Best Actor'.

== Personal life ==
Gauri Karnik has been married to Sarim Momin since 2010 and lives in mumbai.

== Filmography ==
=== Films ===
Year	Title	Credited as			
Year	Title	Lyricist	Writer	Director	Notes
2007	Ram Gopal Varma Ki Aag	Yes	No	No	
2008	EMI: Liya Hai To Chukana Padega	Yes	No	No	
2009	Agyaat	Yes	No	No	
2010	Rann	Yes	No	No	
2010	Rakta Charitra	Yes	No	No	
2010	Allah Ke Banday	Yes	No	No	
2013	Huff! It's Too Much	Yes	No	No	
2023	Aseq	No	Yes	No	
2024	Crakk	No	Yes	No	
2026	Human Cocaine	No	Yes	Yes	
2026	Gunmaaster G9	No	Yes	No	

=== TV Series ===
Year	Title	Credited as		
Year	Title	Writer	Director	notes
2022	Karm Yuddh	Yes	No	
2024	Bad Cop	Yes	No	
