= Prachi Shevgaonkar =

Indian environmentalist

- Born: 17 February 1998 (age 28); Pune, Maharashtra, India
- Occupation: Environmentalist
- Organization: Cool The Globe

Prachi Shevgaonkar is a media professional, climate activist, and founder of an application designed for climate action named 'Cool The Globe'.

== Early life ==
Prachi was born and brought up in Pune. She is a media graduate with majors in advertising from Symbiosis Centre of Mass Communication, Pune. The idea of doing something around climate change originated while she was pursuing her graduation and realized that being one of the biggest concerns around the globe today. Her field observation and volunteer work with organizations like Hasiru Dala (Bengaluru) and Abhinav Farmers Club (Pune) has helped her to forge ahead in the direction of developing an application named "Cool the Globe". Prachi has also conducted research on the subject

== Cool the Globe ==
'Cool The Globe' app is a tracker for one's greenhouse gas emissions. It tracks emissions of user's daily actions, and provides guidance on minimizing them. Users can save monthly and yearly targets for reducing their emissions.
