= Ranchi Diaries =

2017 film directed by the Sattwik Mohanty

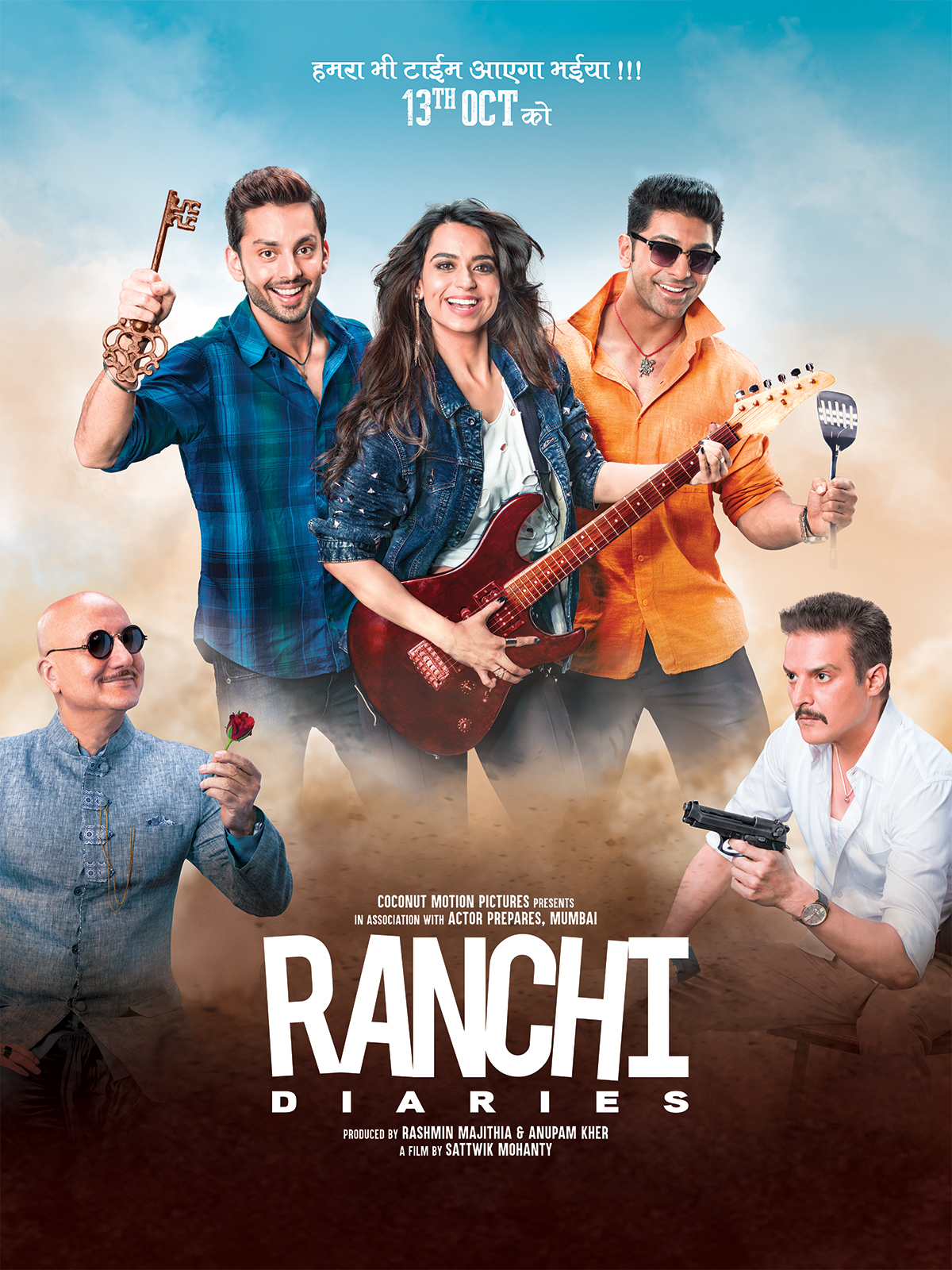
- Directed by: Sattwik Mohanty
- Written by: Sattwik Mohanty
- Produced by: Anupam Kher; (Actor Prepares); Rashmin Majithia (Coconut Motion Pictures)
- Starring: Himansh Kohli; Taaha Shah; Soundarya Sharma; Jimmy Shergill; Satish Kaushik; Anupam Kher; Pitobash Tripathy
- Cinematography: Bibhu Das, (Additional Cinematographer- Shibu Prusty)
- Edited by: Naveen Reddy
- Music by: Jeet Gannguli; Nickk; Tony Kakkar; Bobby–Imran
- Production company: Coconut Motion Pictures
- Release date: 13 October 2017
- Running time: 93 minutes
- Country: India
- Language: Hindi

Ranchi Diaries (2017) is a Hindi film directed by the Sattwik Mohanty. The film has been produced by Anupam Kher under the banner Actor Prepares and Rashmin Majithia under the banner Coconut Motion Pictures. The cast includes Himansh Kohli, Taaha Shah, Soundarya Sharma, Jimmy Shergill, Satish Kaushik, Anupam Kher and Pitobash Tripathy.

== Plot ==
The film depicts the story of Gudiya who hails from Ranchi. She has a dream of becoming a popular pop sensation. Due to unwanted attention from local politico Thakur Bhaiya, she fled with his childhood friend Manish. Eventually Gudiya and her gang attempt robbery in local bank which goes terribly wrong.

== Cast ==
- Himansh Kohli as Manish
- Taaha Shah as Pinku
- Soundarya Sharma as Gudiya
- Jimmy Shergill as Serious Cop
- Satish Kaushik as Corrupt Cop
- Anupam Kher as Thakur Bhaiya
- Pitobash Tripathy as Pradeep Kumar

== Soundtrack ==
Ranchi Diaries

Soundtrack album by Jeet Gannguli, Nickk, Tony Kakkar, Bobby–Imran
- Genre: Feature film soundtrack
- Label: T-Series

Singles from Ranchi Diaries
- 1. "Fashion Queen" Released: 3 September 2017; 2. "Thoda Aur" Released: 20 September 2017; 3. "Helicopter" Released: 27 September 2017; 4. "Godfather" Released: 5 October 2017

The soundtrack was composed by Jeet Gannguli, Nickk, Tony Kakkar, Bobby–Imran and lyrics were by Nickk, Manoj Muntashir, Tony Kakkar, Sattwik Mohanty. Singers include Raahi, Rap: Nickk, Arijit Singh, Palak Muchhal, Tony Kakkar, Neha Kakkar, Mika Singh.

No.	Title	Lyrics	Music	Artist (s)	Length
1.	"Fashion Queen"	Nickk	Nickk	Raahi, Rap: Nickk	2:30
2.	"Thoda Aur"	Manoj Muntashir	Jeet Gannguli	Arijit Singh, Palak Muchhal	2:17
3.	"Helicopter"	Tony Kakkar	Tony Kakkar	Tony Kakkar, Neha Kakkar	2:27
4.	"Godfather"	Sattwik Mohanty	Bobby–Imran	Mika Singh
