= Bigg Boss (Hindi TV series) season 17 =

Indian reality show

Bigg Boss
- Season 17
- Presented by: Salman Khan
- No. of days: 105
- No. of housemates: 21
- Winner: Munawar Faruqui
- Runner-up: Abhishek Kumar
- No. of episodes: 106

Release
- Original network: Colors TV
- Original release: 15 October 2023 – 28 January 2024

Season chronology
- ← Previous; Season 16 Next → Season 18

Bigg Boss 17 also known as Bigg Boss: Dil, Dimaag aur Dum Ka Game was the seventeenth season of the Indian Hindi-language reality television show Bigg Boss. It premiered on 15 October 2023 on Colors TV and JioCinema. Salman Khan hosted the show for the fourteenth time. The grand finale aired on 28 January 2024, where Munawar Faruqui emerged as the winner and Abhishek Kumar was the runner-up.

== Production ==
=== Broadcast ===
A new segment - Just Chill with Arbaaz & Sohail aired on Sunday hosted by Arbaaz Khan and Sohail Khan. Like BB16's segment Bigg Bulletin with Shekhar Suman, in this segment, the hosts interacted with the contestants on the events that have transpired in the particular week. They would also roast the contestants, play games with them and pull off fun gags. Weekend Ka Vaar aired on Fridays and Saturdays similar to Season 16. In Week 1 and 4, Weekend Ka Vaar was aired on Saturday and Sunday. Since Week 10, Weekend Ka Vaar aired on Saturdays and Sundays while the Just Chill segment was merged into Weekend Ka Vaar. In Week 13, Weekend Ka Vaar was aired on Sunday and Monday. For Week 7 and 13, Karan Johar hosted Weekend Ka Vaar in the absence of Salman Khan.

For first time ever in Bigg Boss' History, Grand Finale was aired on TV for 6 hours, 35 minutes and 36 seconds (ad-breaks included) where it started at 6 pm till 12:35 am midnight.

=== Morning anthem ===
Like the previous season, there was a Bigg Boss Anthem in the morning instead of the usual wake-up songs.

=== Concept ===
The concept of Bigg Boss 17 is "Dil, Dimaag, and Dum". The show's contestants are divided into three groups: "Dil" (Heart), "Dimaag" (Mind), and "Dum" (Strength). The contestants can choose to use any of the three approaches. Bigg Boss will participate in the game, forming alliances and showing favouritism.

=== Eye Logo ===
The eye logo this season marked remarkable exceptions from the previous ones. It has a new orange colour palette, with many doors and windows releasing fire, and a blazing orange core acting as the pupil.

=== House ===
The streets of Europe inspired the theme of the house of this season. This house was referred as "Bigg Boss ka Muhallah" (trans. Bigg Boss’s Neighbourhood) with the three bedrooms as three different houses aka Makaans. There was no common dining area this season, instead, dining areas were incorporated into the respective three bedrooms. The Confession Room was designed in a Greek-Gothic style. The house had 110 cameras this season, the highest among all the seasons. Like BB16, the entrance and exit from house were through tunnel instead of main door.

=== Release ===
On 15 September 2023, ColorsTV released a promo video on YouTube and social media, featuring Salman Khan highlighting the three new themes for this season. Dil (Heart; love), Dimaag (Mind; wit) and Dum (Power; fierceness). Then on 23 September 2023, ColorsTV released three videos, each giving glimpses of the three new concepts with Salman Khan announcing the premiere date.

=== Trophy ===
Trophy of BB17 was designed in a way which was replica of house and words BB were installed in middle of trophy as mirror to each other. Trophy was designed by Art Director Omung Kumar B.

== Housemates status ==
Sr	Housemate	Day entered	Day exited	Status
1	Munnawar	Day 1	Day 105	Winner
2	Abhishek	Day 1	Day 84	Ejected
2	Abhishek	Day 84	Day 105	1st runner-up
3	Mannara	Day 1	Day 105	2nd runner-up
4	Ankita	Day 1	Day 105	3rd runner-up
5	Arun	Day 1	Day 105	4th runner-up
6	Vicky	Day 1	Day 101	Evicted
7	Isha	Day 1	Day 98	Evicted
8	Ayesha	Day 64	Day 77	Walked
8	Ayesha	Day 78	Day 98	Evicted
9	Samarth	Day 13	Day 90	Evicted
10	Aoora	Day 55	Day 84	Evicted
11	Anurag	Day 1	Day 79	Evicted By Housemates
12	Neil	Day 1	Day 77	Evicted
13	Rinku	Day 1	Day 77	Evicted
14	Aishwarya	Day 1	Day 70	Evicted By Captain
15	Firoza	Day 1	Day 62	Evicted
16	Sana	Day 1	Day 55	Evicted
17	Sunny	Day 1	Day 48	Ejected
18	Jigna	Day 1	Day 41	Evicted
19	Navid	Day 1	Day 37	Evicted By Housemates
20	Manasvi	Day 13	Day 20	Evicted
21	Soniya	Day 1	Day 13	Evicted By Housemates

== Housemates ==
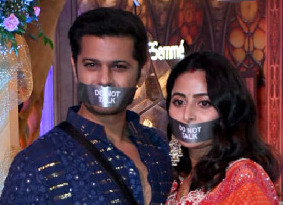
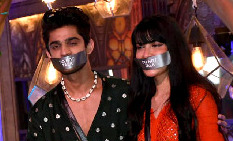
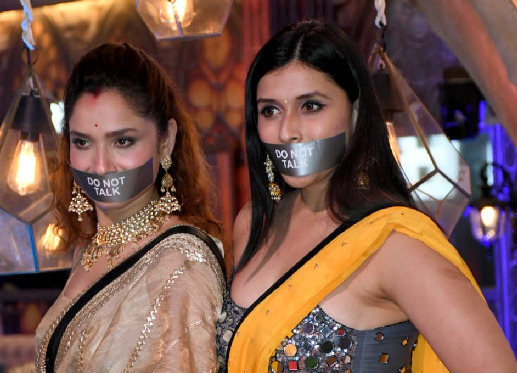
Neil with Aishwarya (left), Abhishek with Khanzaadi (middle), and Ankita with Mannara (right) celebrating Diwali in the house.

The list of contestants in the order of entering the house:

=== Original entrants ===
- Mannara Chopra – Actress. She is the paternal cousin of Priyanka Chopra and Parineeti Chopra. She is best known for the films Zid, Thikka and Rogue.
- Munawar Faruqui – Stand-up comedian, content creator and rapper. He is the winner of Lock Upp 1.
- Aishwarya Sharma – Actress. She is best known for her role in Ghum Hai Kisikey Pyaar Meiin. She also participated in Fear Factor: Khatron Ke Khiladi 13.
- Neil Bhatt – Actor. He is best known for his roles in Ghum Hai Kisikey Pyaar Meiin and Diya Aur Baati Hum.
- Navid Sole – British reality television personality. He participated in the UK reality series The Apprentice 16 in 2022.
- Anurag Dobhal – Travel vlogger & influencer, also known as The UK07 Rider.
- Sana Raees Khan – Lawyer. She is known for involving in the Sheena Bora murder case and Aryan Khan drug case.
- Jigna Vora – Former crime reporter. She was falsely accused in journalist Jyotirmoy Dey's murder under MCOCA.
- Ankita Lokhande – Actress. She is best known for her role in Pavitra Rishta and participating in Jhalak Dikhhla Jaa 4. She has also acted in Hindi films like Manikarnika: The Queen of Jhansi and Baaghi 3.
- Vicky Jain – Businessman and husband of actress Ankita Lokhande. He is the winner of reality show Smart Jodi.
- Soniya Bansal – Actress and model. She is known for playing Tara in the 2019 film Naughty Gang.
- Firoza Khan, also known as Khanzaadi – Rapper and model. She is known for participating in the singing reality show, MTV Hustle 2.
- Sunny Arya – Comedian & content creator, also known as Tehelka Prank.
- Rinku Dhawan – Actress. She is best known for her roles in Kahaani Ghar Ghar Kii and Choti Sarrdaarni.
- Arun Srikanth Mashettey – Influencer & YouTube gamer, also known as Achanak Bayanak Gaming.
- Abhishek Kumar – Actor. He is best known for his role in Udaariyaan.
- Isha Malviya – Actress, model and beauty pageant winner. She is best known for her dual role in Udaariyaan.

=== Wild card entrants ===
- Manasvi Mamgai – Actress, model and social activist. She is best known for her role as Marina Fonseca in Action Jackson.
- Samarth Jurel – Actor and reality show alumni. He is best known for his roles in Maitree and Udaariyaan. He also participated in MTV Splitsvilla 14
- Aoora Park – Singer and composer from South Korea. He is known for being a member of the South Korean boy band Double-A.
- Ayesha Khan – Actress, social media influencer and model. She is best known for her roles in Mukhachitram and Baalveer Returns.

=== Guest entrants ===
- Orhan Awatramani (also known as Orry) – Internet sensation. He was inside the house from Days 41–43.

== Twists ==
=== Bedroom "Makaan" allotment ===
The 3 bedrooms are depicted as 3 different houses resembling Dil, Dimaag and Dum. The bedrooms are:

- Dil Bedroom (Makaan No. 1): With a separate bathroom and washing area, the room's beautiful combination of white and pink creates an ideal atmosphere for couples to connect. The Therapy Room is a new feature included in this room for the season.
- Dimaag Bedroom (Makaan No. 2): Red dominates the room's design, accompanied by larger-than-life chess pieces that fit the theme. The Archive Room, where selected housemates can access house footage, is a new addition. Also, the members of this bedroom would be responsible for the conduct of duties in the house. From Week 9 to Week 13, the bedroom became the Captain's exclusive bedroom.
- Dum Bedroom (Makaan No. 3): The room is adorned with gothic artwork, featuring mostly black. It isn't quite comforting, challenging the tolerance and confidence of a housemate. The dining area is exclusive, and a black miniature castle in the room houses the "Answering Machine" telephone.

Allotment by	Week 1	Week 2	Week 3	Week 4	Week 5	Week 6	Week 7	Week 8		Week 9		Week 10		Week 11		Week 12		Week 13	Week 14		Week 15	
Allotment by	Week 1	Week 2	Week 3	Week 4	Week 5	Week 6	Week 7	Day 51	Day 53	Day 55	Day 60	Day 64	Day 67	Day 71	Day 74	Day 79	Day 81	Week 13	Day 91	Day 94	Day 99	Day 102
Allotment by	Self	Bigg Boss																	Self			
Abhishek	Dum	Dil		Chowk	Dil			Chowk	Dum													
Ankita	Dil							Chowk	Dum								Dimaag				Dil	
Arun	Dimaag	Dum			Dimaag			Chowk	Dimaag		Chowk	Dum										
Mannara	Dil	Dimaag			Dil			Chowk	Dil											Dum	Dimaag	Dil
Munawar	Dum	Dimaag			Dil			Chowk	Dil		Dimaag		Dil						Dimaag	Dum		Dimaag
Vicky	Dil				Dimaag			Chowk	Dum										Dimaag		Dil	
Isha	Dil							Chowk	Dil				Dimaag		Dil							
Ayesha												Chowk								Dil		
Samarth			Dum		Dil			Chowk	Dil													
Aoora										Dimaag	Chowk	Dum			Dimaag		Dum					
Anurag	Dimaag	Dum			Dimaag			Chowk	Dum													
Neil	Dil				Dum			Chowk	Dil													
Rinku	Dum	Dimaag			Dum			Chowk	Dil													
Aishwarya	Dil				Dum			Chowk	Dimaag		Dil											
Firoza	Dum	Dimaag			Dum			Chowk	Dum													
Sana	Dimaag	Dum			Dimaag			Chowk	Dum													
Sunny	Dum				Dimaag																	
Jigna	Dimaag				Dum																	
Navid	Dimaag				Dum																	
Manasvi			Dum																			
Soniya	Dimaag	Dum																				

== Nominations table ==
	Week 1	Week 2		Week 3	Week 4	Week 5	Week 6		Week 7	Week 8	Week 9	Week 10		Week 11	Week 12			Week 13	Week 14	Week 15		
	Week 1	Day 9	Day 13	Week 3	Week 4	Week 5	Day 37	Day 38	Week 7	Week 8	Week 9	Day 66	Day 70	Week 11	Day 79	Day 80	Day 83	Week 13	Week 14	Day 98	Day 101	Day 105 Grand Finale
Nominees for Captaincy	Jigna; Sana	No; Captain										Abhishek; Aishwarya; Ankita; Anurag; Aoora; Arun; Isha; Firoza; Mannara; Munawar; Neil; Rinku; Samarth; Vicky	Ankita; Aoora; Ayesha; Isha; Mannara; Samarth; Vicky		Abhishek; Ankita; Anurag; Aoora; Arun; Ayesha; Mannara; Neil; Rinku; Samarth; Vicky	No; Captain	Ankita; Arun; Ayesha; Mannara; Samarth; Vicky		No; Captain			
House Captain	No; Captain	No; Captain										Munawar	Isha		Aoora	No; Captain	Ankita		No; Captain			
Captain's Nominations	No; Captain	No; Captain										Arun; Aishwarya (for Ayesha); Anurag (to evict)	Aishwarya (to evict)	Abhishek; Ayesha (to evict)	Abhishek (to evict)	No; Captain	Abhishek (to eject)	Not eligible	No; Captain			
Vote to:	Evict	Save / Evict	Evict					Save / Evict	Evict								None	Evict	Task	None	WIN	
Munawar	Abhishek	Sana, Sunny, Soniya (to evict); Munawar, Rinku, Navid (to save)	Soniya	Isha; Arun; Manasvi	Navid; Mannara	Sunny; Ankita	Not eligible	Abhishek (to save)	Not eligible	Aishwarya; Anurag; Sana; Firoza	Anurag; Aishwarya	House; Captain	Not eligible	Not eligible	Anurag	Arun	Not eligible	Ayesha; Arun; Samarth	Won	No; Nominations	No; Nominations	Winner (Day 105)
Abhishek	Firoza	Abhishek; Isha (to save)	Sana	Samarth; Sana	Aishwarya; Ankita	Ankita; Samarth	Not eligible	Isha (to save)	Not eligible	Mannara; Sana; Arun; Vicky	Samarth; Vicky	Samarth; Ankita (for Neil)	Not eligible	Not eligible	Nominated	Samarth	Not eligible	Ejected (Day 83)	Won	No; Nominations	No; Nominations	1st runner-up (Day 105)
Abhishek	Firoza	Abhishek; Isha (to save)	Sana	Samarth; Sana	Aishwarya; Ankita	Ankita; Samarth	Not eligible	Isha (to save)	Not eligible	Mannara; Sana; Arun; Vicky	Samarth; Vicky	Samarth; Ankita (for Neil)	Not eligible	Not eligible	Nominated	Samarth	Not eligible	Vicky; Isha; Arun; Samarth	Won	No; Nominations	No; Nominations	1st runner-up (Day 105)
Mannara	Isha	Sana, Sunny, Soniya (to evict); Munawar, Rinku, Navid (to save)	Soniya	Isha; Samarth; Manasvi	Navid; Mannara	Ankita; Firoza	Not eligible	Arun (to save)	Arun	Abhishek; Firoza; Ankita	Anurag; Abhishek	None called	Not eligible	Not eligible	Abhishek	Not eligible	Not eligible	Munawar; Ayesha	Won	No; Nominations	No; Nominations	2nd runner-up (Day 105)
Ankita	Neil	Abhishek; Isha (to save)	Sana	Sana; Rinku	Neil; Aishwarya	Neil; Aishwarya	Not eligible	Mannara (to save)	Mannara	Anurag; Mannara	Abhishek; Mannara	Abhishek; Aishwarya (for Vicky)	Nominated	Not eligible	Anurag	Not eligible	House; Captain		Lost	No; Nominations	No; Nominations	3rd runner-up (Day 105)
Arun	Navid	Rinku, Navid, Firoza, Abhishek, Isha, Neil, Aishwarya, Munawar (to evict)	Soniya	Samarth; Sana	Anurag; Samarth	Ankita; Firoza; Abhishek	Rinku; Jigna; Navid	Jigna (to evict)	Not eligible	Sana; Abhishek	Vicky; Abhishek	None called	Not eligible	Not eligible	Anurag	Munawar	Not eligible	Vicky; Abhishek; Munawar; Ayesha	Won	No; Nominations	No; Nominations	4th runner-up (Day 105)
Vicky	Mannara	Abhishek; Isha (to save)	Soniya	Aishwarya; Sana	Aishwarya; Neil	Aishwarya; Neil; Abhishek	Rinku; Jigna; Navid	Munawar (to save)	Neil	Samarth	Abhishek; Aishwarya	Aishwarya; Abhishek (for Ankita)	Not eligible	Not eligible	Anurag	Not eligible	Not eligible	Abhishek; Ayesha; Arun; Mannara	Lost	No; Nominations	Evicted (Day 101)	
Isha	Mannara	Abhishek; Isha (to save)	Sana	Mannara; Manasvi	Neil; Ankita	Firoza; Sunny	Not eligible	Vicky (to save)	Not eligible	Firoza; Arun	Abhishek; Anurag	Abhishek; Aishwarya (for Samarth)	House; Captain		Ayesha	Not eligible	Not eligible	Abhishek; Munawar; Ayesha; Arun; Mannara	Lost	Evicted (Day 98)		
Ayesha	Not In House											Anurag; Isha (for Aoora)	Not eligible	Not eligible	Walked (Day 77)	Aoora	Not eligible	Vicky; Munawar; Arun; Samarth; Mannara	Lost	Evicted (Day 97)		
Ayesha	Not In House											Anurag; Isha (for Aoora)	Not eligible	Not eligible	Nominated	Aoora	Not eligible	Vicky; Munawar; Arun; Samarth; Mannara	Lost	Evicted (Day 97)		
Samarth	Not In House			Arun; Manasvi	Sunny; Arun	Abhishek; Mannara	Not eligible	Rinku (to save)	Not eligible	Firoza; Vicky	Abhishek; Vicky	Abhishek; Aishwarya (for Isha)	Not eligible	Rinku	Anurag	Munawar	Not eligible	Abhishek; Munawar; Ayesha	Evicted (Day 90)			
Aoora	Not In House										Rinku; Firoza	None called	Not eligible	Not eligible	House; Captain	Ayesha; Abhishek	Not eligible	Evicted (Day 84)				
Anurag	Navid	Rinku, Navid, Firoza, Abhishek, Isha, Neil, Aishwarya, Munawar (to evict)	Soniya	Sana; Manasvi	Sunny; Arun	Abhishek; Samarth; Abhishek	Rinku; Jigna; Navid	Not eligible	Rinku	Sana; Munawar	Abhishek; Rinku	Mannara; Arun (for Mannara)	Nominated	Not eligible	Nominated	Evicted by Housemates (Day 79)						
Neil	Mannara	Abhishek; Isha (to save)	Sana	Vicky; Sana	Vicky; Ankita	Vicky; Ankita	Navid	Samarth (to save)	Ankita	Anurag; Firoza; Vicky	Firoza; Vicky	Isha; Samarth (for Anurag); Samarth; Ankita (for Abhishek); Vicky; Ankita (for Arun)	Nominated	Not eligible	Evicted (Day 77)							
Rinku	Khanzaadi	Sana, Sunny, Soniya (to evict); Munawar, Rinku, Navid (to save)	Soniya	Isha; Samarth; Manasvi	Navid; Mannara	Mannara; Vicky	Nominated	Ankita (to evict)	Vicky	Anurag; Firoza	Firoza; Ankita	Ankita; Samarth (for Aishwarya)	Not eligible	Not eligible	Evicted (Day 77)							
Aishwarya	Mannara	Abhishek; Isha (to save)	Sana	Vicky; Arun	Ankita; Vicky	Ankita; Vicky	Navid	Sunny (to evict)	Not eligible	Anurag; Abhishek; Firoza; Munawar; Vicky	Vicky; Firoza	Isha; Ankita (for Rinku)	Nominated	Evicted by Captain (Day 70)								
Firoza	Abhishek	Sana, Sunny, Soniya (to evict); Munawar, Rinku, Navid (to save)	Sana	Arun; Mannara; Manasvi	Navid; Mannara	Arun; Mannara	Navid	Aishwarya (to save)	Nominated	Refused to vote	Rinku; Aishwarya	Evicted (Day 62)										
Sana	Navid	Rinku, Navid, Firoza, Abhishek, Isha, Neil, Aishwarya, Munawar (to evict)	BTM 2	Anurag; Vicky	Anurag; Sunny	Khanzaadi; Sunny; Abhishek	Rinku; Jigna; Navid	Neil (to save)	Not eligible	Abhishek; Arun; Munawar; Vicky	Evicted (Day 55)											
Sunny	Abhishek	Rinku, Navid, Firoza, Abhishek, Isha, Neil, Aishwarya, Munawar (to evict)	Soniya	Sana; Samarth	Anurag; Samarth	Abhishek; Samarth; Abhishek	Rinku; Jigna; Navid	Firoza (to save)	Not eligible	Ejected (Day 48)												
Jigna	Navid	Sana, Sunny, Soniya (to evict); Munawar, Rinku, Navid (to save)	Soniya	Sana; Firoza; Manasvi	Navid; Mannara	Arun; Sunny	Nominated	Sana (to evict)	Evicted (Day 41)													
Navid	Arun	Sana, Sunny, Soniya (to evict); Munawar, Rinku, Navid (to save)	Soniya	Arun; Sunny; Manasvi	Navid; Mannara	Arun; Sunny	Nominated	Evicted by Housemates (Day 37)														
Manasvi	Not In House		Not eligible	Samarth; Isha	Evicted (Day 20)																	
Soniya	Navid	Rinku, Navid, Firoza, Abhishek, Isha, Neil, Aishwarya, Munawar (to evict)	BTM 2	Evicted by Housemates (Day 13)																		
Notes	1, 2	3	4	5	6	7, 8, 9	10	8, 11	8, 12, 13	14, 15	14, 16, 17	14, 18	19	14, 20, 21	22, 23	24	25, 26	27	28, 29	30	31	32
Against Public Vote	Abhishek; Mannara; Navid	Aishwarya; Firoza; Neil; Sana; Soniya; Sunny	Sana; Soniya	Arun; Isha; Manasvi; Samarth; Sana	Aishwarya; Ankita; Anurag; Arun; Mannara; Navid; Neil; Samarth; Sunny	Abhishek; Ankita; Anurag; Firoza; Sunny	Jigna; Navid; Rinku	Ankita; Anurag; Jigna; Sana; Sunny	Ankita; Anurag; Arun; Firoza; Mannara; Neil; Rinku; Vicky	Abhishek; Anurag; Arun; Firoza; Munawar; Neil; Sana; Vicky	Abhishek; Firoza; Neil; Vicky	Aishwarya; Ankita; Anurag; Neil		Abhishek; Ayesha; Neil; Rinku	Abhishek; Anurag; Ayesha	Abhishek; Aoora; Arun; Ayesha; Munawar; Samarth		Abhishek; Arun; Ayesha; Mannara; Munawar; Samarth; Vicky	Ankita; Ayesha; Isha; Vicky	Abhishek; Ankita; Arun; Mannara; Munawar; Vicky	Abhishek; Ankita; Arun; Mannara; Munawar	
Re-entered	None														Ayesha	None	Abhishek	None				
Walked	None													Ayesha	None							
Ejected	None								Sunny	None				None			Abhishek	None				
Evicted	No; Eviction	Soniya		Manasvi	No; Eviction		Navid	Jigna	No; Eviction	Sana	Firoza	Aishwarya		Rinku	Anurag	Aoora		Samarth	Ayesha	Vicky	Arun	Ankita
Evicted	No; Eviction	Soniya		Manasvi	No; Eviction		Navid	Jigna	No; Eviction	Sana	Firoza	Aishwarya		Neil	Anurag	Aoora		Samarth	Isha	Vicky	Mannara	
Evicted	No; Eviction	Soniya		Manasvi	No; Eviction		Navid	Jigna	No; Eviction	Sana	Firoza	Aishwarya		Neil	Anurag	Aoora		Samarth	Isha	Vicky	Abhishek	Munawar

indicates the House Captain.
indicates that the Housemate was directly nominated for eviction prior to the regular nominations process.
indicates that the Housemate was granted immunity from nominations.
indicates that housemate was evicted from the house.
indicates that housemate was ejected from the house.
indicates that housemate walked out from the house.
indicates that housemate was evicted by other housemates votes.
indicates the winner.
indicates the first runner up.
indicates the second runner up.
indicates the third runner up.
indicates the fourth runner up.

=== Nomination notes ===
- ^1: On First Day First Show, Jigna & Sana were chosen as Captaincy Contenders. Both fought in Verbal Dangal but it resulted in Tie which resulted in no Captain for Week 1.
- ^2: On Day 2, Housemates had to nominate one housemate for eviction from their Makaan (Bedroom).
- ^3: On Day 9, the Nomination process was conducted in three phases respectively - 1. Dum Housemates had to nominate eight housemates from the house. 2. Dil housemates had to save two housemates from eight nominated by Dum housemates. 3. Dimaag housemates had to replace three nominated contestants with three safe contestants for eviction.
- ^4: On Day 13, Sana and Soniya were declared as bottom 2. Housemates excluding Sana, Soniya and Manasvi have to vote out one among them for eviction based on their impact in the house.
- ^5: On Day 16, Housemates had to nominate two housemates for eviction and at last, Dimaag housemates had a right to nominate one housemate from safe housemates by mutual decision.
- ^6: On Day 23, Housemates had to nominate two housemates for eviction from their Makaan where Dil & Dum Makaan housemates voted earlier respectively and at last, Dimaag Makaan housemates had a right to identify who are nominated housemates where they identify correctly they will be safe along with nominating two safe housemates for eviction while if they don't they have to nominate two housemates from their Makaan for eviction by mutual decision.
- ^7: On Day 26, Rinku won Race for Power and she got saved from Week 5's nominations.
- ^8: On Day 30, Anurag was nominated by Bigg Boss for the rest of the season due to property damage.
- ^9: On Day 32, Housemates had to nominate two housemates for eviction and at last, Dimaag housemates had a right to nominate one housemate from safe housemates by mutual decision.
- ^10: On Day 37, Dimaag housemates had to nominate three housemates for eviction on the basis of housemates who are living on borrowed period or grace period and at last, as all of three housemates nominated were from Dum Makaan so safe housemates from Dum Makaan had to mutually decide to evict one while none was from Dil Makaan so they had no right to vote whereas Dimaag housemates had already nominated three.
- ^11: On Day 38, Housemates had to decide whether they want to save or nominate a highlighted housemate out of all when they have right.
- ^12: On Day 44, Nomination process was conducted in chain reaction where prior nominated Anurag would decide next housemate who would be directly nominated with him after which nominated contestant would get chance to nominate other housemate and this process would continue for six times. Firoza was directly nominated by Bigg Boss due to violation of discussing nominations where she told housemates to nominate her.
- ^13: On Day 48, Sunny was ejected as he physically handled Abhishek.
- ^14: On Day 45, Anurag was replaced by Neil for being nominated for full season after decision by Dimaag housemates.
- ^15: On Day 51, Housemates had to nominate whichever housemate they want to and while one housemate would be nominated if that housemate has to face three or more housemates nominating him/her.
- ^16: On Day 54, Arun won the immunity task and was immuned from Week 9's nominations.
- ^17: On Day 58, Housemates had to nominate two other housemates for eviction excluding Neil and Arun.
- ^18: On Day 66, Housemates had to choose a representative who had to nominate two other housemates on their behalf for eviction excluding Neil and captain Munawar and at last, captain Munawar had the power to directly nominate one more housemate.
- ^19: On Day 70, captain Isha had option to choose eviction on basis of public votes or on basis of her decision which would be made on the grounds of account sheet of nominated contestants' rule breaks during season which was kept as a punishment given to housemates by Bigg Boss in earlier week. Captain Isha had right for direct eviction if she chose second option.
- ^20: On Day 72, Housemates had to nominate by getting chance to pick up a ringing phone in Makaan No. 3 where they had to compete to reach up to it. At last, captain Isha had right to nominate two housemates for eviction.
- ^21: On Day 77, Ayesha was taken out of house due to medical reasons.
- ^22: On Day 78, Ayesha re-entered the house after getting medical treatment outside.
- ^23: On Day 79, Current captain Aoora and ex captains Munawar and Isha had to nominate one housemate each for eviction. After nomination, other housemates had right for vote one housemate for direct eviction among nominated housemates on the basis of least deserving in house.
- ^24: On Day 80, Nomination process was conducted in chain reaction where one housemate would nominate any other housemate then that nominated housemate would nominate any other housemate and the process goes on till it breaks.
- ^25: On Day 83, Captain Ankita had right to decide on Abhishek's ejection as the latter physically hit Samarth on Day 81.
- ^26: On Day 84, Abhishek re-entered the house after consultation of matter with housemates.
- ^27: On Day 86, Housemate can be nominated if he/she gets three or more votes from other housemates after respected housemate name is taken by Captain Ankita.
- ^28: On Days 94 and 95, Nominations were conducted in a task between two teams where whichever team wins would be safe from nominations and other team would be nominated.
- ^29: On Day 97, a task was conducted in the house where live audience came to cheer for all the housemates on their performance and at the end of task whichever nominated housemate received least votes by live audience on the basis of their whole journey would get evicted.
- ^30: On Day 98, host Salman Khan from stage announced that all housemates are nominated for the final eviction.
- ^31: On Day 101, the five finalists were nominated for the final voting to decide the winner.
- ^32: On Day 107, after the announcement of the top two finalists, voting lines were opened once again for 10 minutes to decide the winner.

== Guest appearances ==
Week(s)	Day(s)	Guest(s)	Note(s)	Ref.
First Day First Show	Day 0	Nishil Mehta	To support his mother Jigna Vora via video call	
First Day First Show	Day 0	Deepika Arya	To prank with her husband Sunny Arya	
First Day First Show	Day 0	Anita Dhawan	To support her daughter Rinku Dhawan	
Week 1	Day 6	Tiger Shroff & Kriti Sanon	To promote their movie Ganapath and interact with the housemates	
Week 1	Day 6	Kangana Ranaut	To promote her movie Tejas and interact with the housemates	
Week 1	Day 6	Vishal Aditya Singh & Kanika Mann	To promote their show Chand Jalne Laga and interact with the housemates	
Week 1	Day 6	Gippy Grewal & Tanu Grewal	To promote their movie Maujaan Hi Maujaan	
Week 2	Day 13	Arbaaz Khan & Sohail Khan	For announcement of Just Chill with Arbaaz & Sohail	
Week 2	Day 13	Karan Kundrra & Mouni Roy	To promote Temptation Island India and interact with the housemates	
Week 2	Day 13	Krushna Abhishek	To promote Bigg Buzz and interact with the housemates	
Week 3	Day 20	Elvish Yadav & Manisha Rani	To promote their song Bolero	
Week 3	Day 20	King	To promote his song Tu Jaana Na Paaya and interact with the housemates	
Week 3	Day 20	Mahi Bhanushali, Sudha Chandran & Amar Upadhyay	To promote their show Doree	
Week 4 Diwali Dhamaal	Day 28	Katrina Kaif	To promote her movie Tiger 3 & celebrate Diwali with the housemates	
Week 4 Diwali Dhamaal	Day 28	Bharti Singh & Haarsh Limbachiyaa	To celebrate Diwali with host, guests & the housemates	
Week 4 Diwali Dhamaal	Day 28	Sunanda Sharma	To promote her song Chandigarh ka Chokra & celebrate Diwali with the housemates	
Week 4 Diwali Dhamaal	Day 28	Ali Brothers (Pervez, Bablu & Shahrukh)	To celebrate Diwali with the housemates	
Week 4 Diwali Dhamaal	Day 28	Samarth's parents and brother	To support their son & his brother respectively Samarth via a video message	
Week 4 Diwali Dhamaal	Day 28	Ashish Malviya & Mamta Malviya	To support their daughter Isha via a video message	
Week 4 Diwali Dhamaal	Day 28	Kamini Chopra Handa	To support her daughter Mannara via a video message	
Week 4 Diwali Dhamaal	Day 28	Ramashrey Pandey & Sandhya Pandey	To support their son Abhishek via a video message	
Week 4 Diwali Dhamaal	Day 28	Deepika Arya & Iknoor Arya	To support her husband & her father respectively Sunny via a video message	
Week 4 Diwali Dhamaal	Day 28	Himanshu Bhatt & Sunita Bhatt	To support their son Neil via a video message	
Week 4 Diwali Dhamaal	Day 28	Arvind Sharma & Muktika Sharma	To support their daughter Aishwarya via a video message	
Week 4 Diwali Dhamaal	Day 28	Anita Dhawan & Eshaan Karmarkar	To support her daughter & his mom respectively Rinku via a video message	
Week 4 Diwali Dhamaal	Day 28	Mikael Faruqui	To support his father Munawar via a video message	
Week 4 Diwali Dhamaal	Day 28	Shweta Lokhande	To support her daughter Ankita via a video message	
Week 4 Diwali Dhamaal	Day 28	Nishil Mehta	To support his mother Jigna via a video message	
Week 4 Diwali Dhamaal	Day 28	Navid's sister and friend	To support her brother and his friend respectively Navid via a video message	
Week 4 Diwali Dhamaal	Day 28	Vinod Kumar Jain, Ranjana Jain, Vishal Kumar Jain & Reshu Jain	To support their son, his brother and her brother-in-law respectively Vicky via a video message	
Week 4 Diwali Dhamaal	Day 28	Sana's parents	To support their daughter Sana via a video message	
Week 4 Diwali Dhamaal	Day 28	Malak Mashettey & Jury Mashettey	To support her husband & her father respectively Arun via a video message	
Week 4 Diwali Dhamaal	Day 28	Khanzaadi's mother	To support her daughter Khanzaadi via a video message	
Week 4 Diwali Dhamaal	Day 28	Anurag's mother	To support her son Anurag via a video message	
Week 5	Day 34	Supriya Pathak, Rajeev Mehta, Anang Desai, Vandana Pathak & Jamnadas Majethia	To promote their movie Khichdi 2: Mission Paanthukistan and interact with the housemates	
Week 5	Day 34	Alizeh Agnihotri, Zeyn Shaw, Sahil Mehta, Prasanna Bisht & MC Stan	To promote their movie Farrey and interact with the housemates	
Week 6	Day 36	Jasmeen Kaur Bindra	To make "Just Looking Like A Wow" reel with the housemates in Just Chill with Arbaaz and Sohail	
Week 6	Day 41	Muttiah Muralitharan & Madhur Mittal	To promote their movie 800	
Week 6	Day 41	Sunny Leone & Abhishek Singh	To promote their song Third Party and interact with the housemates	
Week 6	Day 41	Shweta Lokhande & Ranjana Jain	To interact with her daughter Ankita and her son Vicky respectively	
Week 6	Day 42	Orhan "Orry" Awatramani	Guest entrant in the house for a day and to conduct a housewarming party task	
Week 7	Day 48	Karan Johar	To host Weekend Ka Vaar in absence of Salman Khan	
Week 7	Day 48	Ekta Kapoor	To give advice via a video message to all the housemates	
Week 8	Day 55	Daler Mehndi, Nasir Sirikhan, Yasin Tatby & Jeon Chang-ha	To support Aoora via a video message	
Week 9	Day 62	Bharti Singh & Haarsh Limbachiyaa	To interact with host and entertain the housemates	
Week 10	Day 70	Raveena Tandon & Abdu Rozik	To interact with host and celebrate Christmas with the housemates	
Week 11	Day 77	Mika Singh, Arbaaz Khan, Sohail Khan, Dharmendra, Hans Raj Hans & Krushna Abhishek	To interact with host and for New Year celebration with the housemates	
Week 11	Day 77	Shagun Pandey & Shruti Choudhary	To promote their show Mera Balam Thanedaar	
Week 11	Day 77	DJ Chetas	For New Year celebration with the housemates	
Week 12	Day 84	Tabu	To interact with host and the housemates	
Week 13	Day 87–88	Shweta Lokhande (Ankita's mother)	To meet the housemates for Family Week	
Week 13	Day 87–88	Ranjana Jain (Vicky's mother)	To meet the housemates for Family Week	
Week 13	Day 87–88	Malak Mashettey (Arun's wife)	To meet the housemates for Family Week	
Week 13	Day 88	Jury Mashettey (Arun's daughter)	To meet the housemates for Family Week	
Week 13	Day 88–89	Mitali Handa (Mannara's sister)	To meet the housemates for Family Week	
Week 13	Day 88–89	Amreen Shaikh (Munawar's sister)	To meet the housemates for Family Week	
Week 13	Day 88–89	Shahabaz Khan (Ayesha's brother)	To meet the housemates for Family Week	
Week 13	Day 89–90	Ashish Malviya (Isha's father)	To meet the housemates for Family Week	
Week 13	Day 89–90	Mukesh Jurel (Samarth's father)	To meet the housemates for Family Week	
Week 13	Day 89–90	Sandhya Pandey (Abhishek's mother)	To meet the housemates for Family Week	
Week 13	Day 90	Prem Jyotish	To predict the future of the housemates	
Week 13	Day 91	Karan Johar	To host Weekend Ka Vaar in absence of Salman Khan	
Week 13	Day 91	Bharti Singh & Haarsh Limbachiyaa	To interact with host and entertain the housemates	
Week 13	Day 91	Tarun Garg (COO of Hyundai Motor India Ltd.)	To announce new Hyundai Creta as a prize for the winner	
Week 13	Day 91	Suniel Shetty	To promote Dance Deewane	
Week 14	Day 97	Vankush Arora	To assist the housemates in writing roasts for BB Roast Night	
Week 14	Day 97	Krushna Abhishek & Sudesh Lehri	To host BB Roast Night and entertain the housemates	
Week 14	Day 98	Shahid Kapoor & Kriti Sanon	To promote their movie Teri Baaton Mein Aisa Uljha Jiya and interact with the housemates	
Week 14	Day 98	Shweta Lokhande, Mitali Handa, Reshu Jain, Sandhya Pandey & Ashish Malviya	To interact with host about their family members Ankita, Mannara, Vicky, Abhishek & Isha respectively	
Week 14	Day 98	Anil Kapoor	To promote his movie Fighter and interact with the housemates	
Week 14	Day 98	Riyan Mipi, Nithin Nj & Shashi Kumar	To perform dance and promote Dance Deewane	
Week 15	Day 103	Rohit Shetty	To ask questions to the finalists	
Week 15	Day 104	Dibang	To interview each finalist and their respective supporters	
Week 15	Day 104	Amruta Khanvilkar	To support Ankita	
Week 15	Day 104	Pooja Bhatt	To support Mannara	
Week 15	Day 104	Karan Kundrra	To support Munawar	
Week 15	Day 104	Sandiip Sikcand & Deepika Arya	To support Arun	
Week 15	Day 104	Shalin Bhanot	To support Abhishek	
Week 15	Day 104	Saurish Sharma & Chirag Daruwalla	To predict the result of the finale	
Grand Finale	Day 106	Bharti Singh, Krushna Abhishek, Sudesh Lehri, Orhan "Orry" Awatramani, Haarsh Limbachiyaa & Abdu Rozik	To entertain the housemates	
Grand Finale	Day 106	Ajay Devgn & R. Madhavan	To promote their movie Shaitaan and conduct the first eviction	
Grand Finale	Day 106	Madhuri Dixit & Suniel Shetty	To promote Dance Deewane	
Grand Finale	Day 106	Arbaaz Khan & Sohail Khan	To interact with host and the contestants	
Grand Finale	Day 106	Karam Rajpal & Trupti Mishra	To promote their show Qayaamat Se Qayaamat Tak	
Grand Finale	Day 106	Tarun Garg (COO of Hyundai Motor India Ltd.)	To congratulate the top 2 via a video message	

== Reception ==
The series grand premiere episode was reviewed by Times Now.
