= Aata Hou De Dhingana =

Indian Marathi-language TV game show

- Presented by: Siddharth Jadhav
- Country of origin: India
- Original language: Marathi
- No. of seasons: 5
- No. of episodes: 172

Production
- Camera setup: Multi-camera
- Running time: 45 minutes
- Production company: Frames Production

Original release
- Network: Star Pravah
- Release: 10 September 2022 – present

Related
- Enkitta Modhaade

Aata Hou De Dhingana (transl. Let It Happen Now) is an Indian Marathi language television game show which aired on Star Pravah. It premiered from 10 September 2022 airing every weekend. The show airing 5 seasons which is hosted by Siddharth Jadhav.

== Concept ==
The show features thirteen Star Pravah's shows competing against each other in a music competition.

=== Special episode ===
- 1 January 2023
- 12 February 2023
- 31 December 2023
- 3 March 2024
- 29 December 2024
- 20 April 2025
- 28 December 2025

== Seasons ==
Season	Episodes	Originally Broadcast	
Season	Episodes	First aired	Last aired
1	44	10 September 2022	12 February 2023
2	40	21 October 2023	3 March 2024
3	46	16 November 2024	20 April 2025
4	42	9 August 2025	28 December 2025
5	ongoing	29 August 2026	present

== Teams ==
=== Season 1 ===
Episodes	Teams	Winner	Amount
1-2	Tuzech Mi Geet Gaat Aahe	Tuzech Mi Geet Gaat Aahe	₹ 1,05,000
1-2	Sukh Mhanje Nakki Kay Asta!	Tuzech Mi Geet Gaat Aahe	₹ 1,05,000
3-4	Sahkutumb Sahparivar	Thipkyanchi Rangoli	₹ 1,10,102
3-4	Thipkyanchi Rangoli	Thipkyanchi Rangoli	₹ 1,10,102
5-6	Lagnachi Bedi	Aboli	₹ 104
5-6	Aboli	Aboli	₹ 104
7-8	Bhannat Sasava	Bhannat Sasava	₹ 102
7-8	Susat Suna	Bhannat Sasava	₹ 102
9-10	Swabhiman – Shodh Astitvacha	Swabhiman – Shodh Astitvacha	₹ 50,104
9-10	Rang Majha Vegla	Swabhiman – Shodh Astitvacha	₹ 50,104
11-12	Kadkadit Kandil	Chunchunit Pantya	₹ 1,05,101
11-12	Chunchunit Pantya	Chunchunit Pantya	₹ 1,05,101
13-14	Muramba	Muramba	₹ 50,104
13-14	Phulala Sugandha Maticha	Muramba	₹ 50,104
15-16	Wingetale Dangekhor	Sahakutumb Sahaparivar	₹ 35,000
15-16	Sahkutumb Sahparivar	Sahakutumb Sahaparivar	₹ 35,000
17-18	Mulgi Zali Ho	Aai Kuthe Kay Karte!	₹ 50,000
17-18	Aai Kuthe Kay Karte!	Aai Kuthe Kay Karte!	₹ 50,000
19-20	Phulala Sugandha Maticha	Phulala Sugandha Maticha	₹ 25,000
19-20	Pinkicha Vijay Aso!	Phulala Sugandha Maticha	₹ 25,000
21-22	Lagnachi Bedi	Tuzech Mi Geet Gaat Aahe	₹ 1,00,000
21-22	Tuzech Mi Geet Gaat Aahe	Tuzech Mi Geet Gaat Aahe	₹ 1,00,000
23-24	Sukh Mhanje Nakki Kay Asta!	Sukh Mhanje Nakki Kay Asta! and Aboli	₹ 50,000
23-24	Aboli	Sukh Mhanje Nakki Kay Asta! and Aboli	₹ 50,000
25-26	Left Thipke	Left Thipke	₹ 60,000
25-26	Right Thipke	Left Thipke	₹ 60,000
27-28	Mulgi Zali Ho	Tharala Tar Mag!	₹ 1,10,000
27-28	Tharala Tar Mag!	Tharala Tar Mag!	₹ 1,10,000
29-30	Na Taal	Na Tantra	₹ 50,104
29-30	Na Tantra	Na Tantra	₹ 50,104
31-32	Navin	Shubhechha	₹ 1,00,000
31-32	Varshachya	Shubhechha	₹ 1,00,000
31-32	Hardeek	Shubhechha	₹ 1,00,000
31-32	Shubhechha	Shubhechha	₹ 1,00,000
33-34	Muramba	Tharala Tar Mag!	₹ 1,50,000
33-34	Tharala Tar Mag!	Tharala Tar Mag!	₹ 1,50,000
35-36	Sahakutumb	Sahaparivar	₹ 50,000
35-36	Sahaparivar	Sahaparivar	₹ 50,000
37-38	Golaberij	Tuzech Mi Geet Gaat Aahe	₹ 10,104
37-38	Tuzech Mi Geet Gaat Aahe	Tuzech Mi Geet Gaat Aahe	₹ 10,104
39-40	Lagnachi Bedi	Sukh Mhanje Nakki Kay Asta!	₹ 1,00,000
39-40	Sukh Mhanje Nakki Kay Asta!	Sukh Mhanje Nakki Kay Asta!	₹ 1,00,000
41-42	Shubhvivah	Jallosh Maza Vegla	₹ 60,000
41-42	Jallosh Maza Vegla	Jallosh Maza Vegla	₹ 60,000
43-44	Dhipadi Dhipang Dhichipadi Dhipang	Dhipadi Dhipang Dhichipadi Dhipang	₹ 1,00,000
43-44	Dyav Dya Dyav Dyav	Dhipadi Dhipang Dhichipadi Dhipang	₹ 1,00,000
43-44	Dhakku Makum Dhakku Makum	Dhipadi Dhipang Dhichipadi Dhipang	₹ 1,00,000
43-44	Chiki Chiki Bubum Boom	Dhipadi Dhipang Dhichipadi Dhipang	₹ 1,00,000

=== Season 2 ===
Episodes	Teams	Winner	Amount
1-2	Premachi Gosht	Tharala Tar Mag!	₹ 60,104
1-2	Tharala Tar Mag!	Tharala Tar Mag!	₹ 60,104
3-4	Man Dhaga Dhaga Jodte Nava	Man Dhaga Dhaga Jodte Nava	₹ 1,50,000
3-4	Tuzech Mi Geet Gaat Aahe	Man Dhaga Dhaga Jodte Nava	₹ 1,50,000
5-6	Kunya Rajachi Ga Tu Rani	Kunya Rajachi Ga Tu Rani	₹ 75,000
5-6	Sukh Mhanje Nakki Kay Asta!	Kunya Rajachi Ga Tu Rani	₹ 75,000
7-8	Chiknya Chaklya	Labad Ladu	₹ 35,000
7-8	Labad Ladu	Labad Ladu	₹ 35,000
9-10	Muramba	Muramba	₹ 50,000
9-10	Thipkyanchi Rangoli	Muramba	₹ 50,000
11-12	Aai Kuthe Kay Karte!	Aboli	₹ 25,000
11-12	Aboli	Aboli	₹ 25,000
13-14	Lagnachi Bedi	Lagnachi Bedi	₹ 60,000
13-14	Pinkicha Vijay Aso!	Lagnachi Bedi	₹ 60,000
15-16	Pravengers	Pravengers	₹ 26,000
15-16	Tharala Tar Mag!	Pravengers	₹ 26,000
17-18	Man Dhaga Dhaga Jodte Nava	Laxmichya Paulanni	₹ 1,00,000
17-18	Lakshmichya Paulanni	Laxmichya Paulanni	₹ 1,00,000
19-20	Muramba	Muramba	₹ 25,000
19-20	Shubhvivah	Muramba	₹ 25,000
21-22	Ikadche	Ikadche	₹ 2,00,000
21-22	Tikadche	Ikadche	₹ 2,00,000
21-22	Alikadche	Ikadche	₹ 2,00,000
21-22	Palikadche	Ikadche	₹ 2,00,000
23-24	Ha Ha Hi Hi Hu Hu	Ha Ha Hi Hi Hu Hu	₹ 55,000
23-24	Tuzech Mi Geet Gaat Aahe	Ha Ha Hi Hi Hu Hu	₹ 55,000
25-26	Pravengers Returns	Pravengers Returns	₹ 60,103
25-26	Aai Kuthe Kay Karte!	Pravengers Returns	₹ 60,103
27-28	Aamne Samne Marathit Bol	Premachi Gosht	₹ 1,00,103
27-28	Premachi Gosht	Premachi Gosht	₹ 1,00,103
29-30	Lakshmichya Paulanni	Sukh Mhanje Nakki Kay Asta!	₹ 45,000
29-30	Sukh Mhanje Nakki Kay Asta!	Sukh Mhanje Nakki Kay Asta!	₹ 45,000
31-32	Kunya Rajachi Ga Tu Rani	Aboli	₹ 1,00,000
31-32	Aboli	Aboli	₹ 1,00,000
33-34	Shubhvivah	Man Dhaga Dhaga Jodte Nava	₹ 85,000
33-34	Man Dhaga Dhaga Jodte Nava	Man Dhaga Dhaga Jodte Nava	₹ 85,000
35-36	Premachi Gosht	Sukh Mhanje Nakki Kay Asta!	₹ 1,00,205
35-36	Sukh Mhanje Nakki Kay Asta!	Sukh Mhanje Nakki Kay Asta!	₹ 1,00,205
37-38	Tuzech Mi Geet Gaat Aahe	Tuzech Mi Geet Gaat Aahe	₹ 1,00,000
37-38	Pinkicha Vijay Aso!	Tuzech Mi Geet Gaat Aahe	₹ 1,00,000
39-40	Jodi Number 1	Khatarnak Kho-Kho	₹ 50,000
39-40	Bhir Bhir Bhingarya	Khatarnak Kho-Kho	₹ 50,000
39-40	Gar Gar Bhovare	Khatarnak Kho-Kho	₹ 50,000
39-40	Khatarnak Kho-Kho	Khatarnak Kho-Kho	₹ 50,000

== Tasks ==
- Dhun Tak
- Ishara Tula Kalala Na
- Bobdi Valali
- Sade Made Shintode
- Rekhata Patapata
- Bol Bala Bol
- Fadfad Englishchi Chirfad
- Smiley Kay Gayli

== Adaptations ==
Language	Title	Original release	Network(s)	Last Aired	Notes	Ref.
Tamil	Enkitta Modhaade என்கிட்ட மொதாதே	21 April 2018	Star Vijay	29 September 2019	Original	
Hindi	Ravivaar With Star Parivaar रविवार विथ स्टार परिवार	12 June 2022	Star Plus	25 September 2022	Remake	
Marathi	Aata Hou De Dhingana आता होऊ दे धिंगाणा	10 September 2022	Star Pravah	Ongoing	Remake	
