= Enkitta Mothathe =

Enkitta Mothathe may refer to:

- Engitta Mothathay, a 1990 Indian Tamil-language romantic action drama film
- Engitta Modhathey, a 2017 Indian Tamil-language action drama film
- Enkitta Modhaade, a 2018–2019 Indian Tamil-language reality TV series
