= Ravivaar With Star Parivaar =

Indian television game show

- Presented by: Arjun Bijlani; Amaal Mallik
- Starring: Rupali Ganguly; Harshad Chopda; Gaurav Khanna; Pranali Rathod; Sudhanshu Pandey; Fahmaan Khan; Sumbul Touqeer; Neil Bhatt
- Country of origin: India
- Original language: Hindi
- No. of seasons: 1
- No. of episodes: 16

Production
- Camera setup: Multi-camera
- Running time: 120 minutes
- Production company: Fullscreen Entertainment

Original release
- Network: StarPlus
- Release: 12 June – 25 September 2022

Related
- Enkitta Modhaade; Aata Hou De Dhingana

Ravivaar With Star Parivaar (transl. "Sunday with Star Family") is an Indian Hindi-language television game show that premiered on 12 June 2022 on StarPlus. It digitally streams on Disney+ Hotstar. The series is a remake of the Tamil reality script show Enkitta Modhaade The series is hosted by Arjun Bijlani and Amaal Mallik and features various StarPlus television series casts competing in a music competition. The show features eight shows competing against each other to win the title of Best Parivaar. Team Yeh Rishta Kya Kehlata Hai emerged as the winner of the show.

== Cast ==
Team Anupamaa:

- Rupali Ganguly (Episode 1,2,4,5,7,8,9,10,11,12,14,15,16)
- Gaurav Khanna (Episode 1,2,4,5,7,8,9,10,11,12,14,15,16)
- Sudhanshu Pandey (Episode 1,2,4,5,7,8,9,15,16)
- Madalsa Sharma Chakraborty (Episode 1,2,5,7,8,9)
- Aashish Mehrotra (Episode 2,11,15,16)
- Alpana Buch (Episode 2,4,5,9,16)
- Shekhar Shukla (Episode 2,5,9,13,16)
- Tasneem Sheikh (Episode 2,5,9,12,13,16)
- Nidhi Shah (Episode 11,15,16)
- Muskan Bamne (Episode 5,16)

Team Imlie:

- Sumbul Touqeer (Episode 1,3,4,5,6,7,8,9,12,13,14,15,16)
- Fahmaan Khan (Episode 1,3,5,7,8,9,12,13,14,15,16)
- Gaurav Mukesh (Episode 1,3,4,5,7,13,16)
- Nilima Singh (Episode 1,3,4,5,7,9,12,13,16)
- Rajshri Rani (Episode 3,5,16)
- Neetu Pandey (Episode 3,16)
- Resham Prashant (Episode 3,4,5,16)
- Vaibhavi Kapoor (Episode 3,5)

Team Yeh Rishta Kya Kehlata Hai:

- Pranali Rathod (Episode 1,3,4,6,7,8,10,11,14,15,16)
- Harshad Chopda (Episode 1,3,4,7,8,14,16)
- Karishma Sawant (Episode 1,3,16)
- Sachin Tyagi (Episode 1,3,7,15,16)
- Mayank Arora (Episode 3,16)
- Sharan Anandani (Episode 3,16)
- Vinay Jain (Episode 3,4,16)
- Pragati Mehra (Episode 3,4,16)
- Ami Trivedi (Episode 7,8,11,16)
- Paras Priyadarshan(Episode 11,16)

Team Pandya Store:

- Shiny Doshi (Episode 1,6,7,13,14,16)
- Kinshuk Mahajan (Episode 1,6,13,14,16)
- Alice Kaushik (Episode 1,6,8,9,11,12,13,14,15,16)
- Kanwar Dhillon (Episode 1,6,7,8,9,10,11,12,13,14,15,16)
- Akshay Kharodia (Episode 6,16)
- Simran Budharup (Episode 6,7,10,16)
- Krutika Desai Khan (Episode 6,7,9,11,16)
- Mohit Parmar (Episode 6,16)

Team Ghum Hai Kisikey Pyaar Meiin:

- Ayesha Singh (Episode 1,2,7,8,10,11,16)
- Neil Bhatt (Episode 1,2,7,8,9,12,15,16)
- Aishwarya Sharma Bhatt (Episode 1,2,7,12,16)
- Kishori Shahane (Episode 1,2,7,12,13,16)
- Sheetal Maulik (Episode 2)
- Mridul Kumar Sinha (Episode 2)
- Tanvi Thakkar (Episode 2)
- Sachin Shroff (Episode 2)

Team Banni Chow Home Delivery:

- Ulka Gupta (Episode 1,6,7,9,10,12,13,14,15,16)
- Pravisht Mishra (Episode 1,6,7,9,12,13,14,15,16)
- Rajendra Chawla (Episode 1,6,7,9,16)
- Parvati Sehgal (Episode 1,6,7,9,16)

Team Saath Nibhaana Saathiya 2:

- Sneha Jain (Episode 1,7)
- Gautam Vig (Episode 1,7)
- Akanksha Juneja (Episode 1)
- Roma Bali (Episode 1,7)
- Hargun Grover (Episode 7)

Team Yeh Hai Chahatein: (Eliminated Week 7)

- Sargun Kaur Luthra (Episode 1,4,7)
- Abrar Qazi (Episode 1,4,7)
- Mallika Nayak (Episode 1,4,7)
- Swarna Pandey (Episode 1)
- Siddharth Shivpuri (Episode 1,7)

Team Saas (Week 4):

- Alpana Buch - Anupamaa
- Mallika Nayak -Yeh Hai Chahatein
- Nilima Singh - Imlie
- Pragati Mehra - Yeh Rishta Kya Kehlata Hai

Team Bahu (Week 4):

- Rupali Ganguly - Anupamaa
- Sargun Kaur Luthra - Yeh Hai Chahatein
- Sumbul Touqeer - Imlie
- Pranali Rathod - Yeh Rishta Kya Kehlata Hai

Team Pati (Week 8):

- Gaurav Khanna - Anupamaa
- Kanwar Dhillon - Pandya Store
- Fahmaan Khan - Imlie
- Harshad Chopda - Yeh Rishta Kya Kehlata Hai
- Neil Bhatt - Ghum Hai Kisikey Pyaar Meiin
- Sudhanshu Pandey - Anupamaa
- Vinay Jain - Yeh Rishta Kya Kehlata Hai

Team Patni (Week 8):

- Rupali Ganguly - Anupamaa
- Alice Kaushik - Pandya Store
- Sumbul Touqeer - Imlie
- Pranali Rathod - Yeh Rishta Kya Kehlata Hai
- Ayesha Singh - Ghum Hai Kisikey Pyaar Meiin
- Madalsa Sharma Chakraborty - Anupamaa
- Ami Trivedi - Yeh Rishta Kya Kehlata Hai

Team Ladki Wale (Week 9)

- Kanwar Dhillon - Pandya Store
- Alice Kaushik - Pandya Store
- Fahmaan Khan - Imlie
- Sumbul Touqeer - Imlie
- Pranali Rathod - Yeh Rishta Kya Kehlata Hai
- Krutika Desai Khan - Pandya Store
- Tasneem Sheikh - Anupamaa
- Nilima Singh - Ghum Hai Kisikey Pyaar Meiin

Team Ladke Wale (Week 9)

- Rupali Ganguly - Anupamaa
- Gaurav Khanna - Anupamaa
- Sudhanshu Pandey - Anupamaa
- Madalsa Sharma Chakraborty - Anupamaa
- Rajendra Chawla - Banni Chow Home Delivery
- Parvati Sehgal - Banni Chow Home Delivery
- Alpana Buch - Anupamaa
- Neil Bhatt - Ghum Hai Kisikey Pyaar Meiin

Team Rab Ne Bana Di Jodi [RNBDJ] (Week 14)

- Alice Kaushik - Pandya Store
- Kanwar Dhillon - Pandya Store
- Pranali Rathod - Yeh Rishta Kya Kehlata Hai
- Harshad Chopda - Yeh Rishta Kya Kehlata Hai
- Rupali Ganguly - Anupamaa
- Gaurav Khanna - Anupamaa

Team Ek Duje Ke Liye [EDKL] (Week 14)

- Sumbul Touqeer - Imlie
- Fahmaan Khan - Imlie
- Shiny Doshi - Pandya Store
- Kinshuk Mahajan - Pandya Store
- Ulka Gupta - Banni Chow Home Delivery
- Pravisht Mishra - Banni Chow Home Delivery

== Team status ==
Teams	Status	Place	Exit Week	Ref.
Yeh Rishta Kya Kehlata Hai	Winner	1st	Week 16	
Imlie	1st Runner-up	2nd	Week 16	
Anupamaa	2nd Runner-up	3rd	Week 16	
Pandya Store	3rd Runner-up	4th	Week 16	
Ghum Hai Kisikey Pyaar Meiin	4th Runner-up	5th	Week 16	
Banni Chow Home Delivery	5th Runner-up	6th	Week 16	
Saath Nibhaana Saathiya 2	Dropped	7th	Week 8	
Yeh Hai Chahatein	Eliminated	8th	Week 7	

== Winning status ==
Team	Week 1					Week 2				Week 3				Week 4								Week 5				Week 6				Week 7				Week 8								Week 9					Week 11				Week 13								Week 14								Week 15								WEEK 16; GRAND FINALE				
Team	Round 1	Round 2	Round 3	Round 4	Final round	Round 1	Round 2	Round 3	Result	Round 1	Round 2	Round 3	Result	Round 1		Round 2		Round 3		Result		Round 1	Round 2	Round 3	Result	Round 1	Round 2	Round 3	Result	Round 1	Round 2	Round 3	Result	Round 1		Round 2		Round 3		Result		Team	Round 1	Round 2	Round 3	Result	Round 1	Round 2	Round 3	Result	Round 1		Round 2		Round 3		Result		Round 1		Round 2		Round 3		Result		Round 1		Round 2		Round 3		Result		Round 1	Round 2	Round 3	Final Round	Result
Team	Round 1	Round 2	Round 3	Round 4	Final round	Round 1	Round 2	Round 3	Result	Round 1	Round 2	Round 3	Result	Saas	Bahu	Saas	Bahu	Saas	Bahu	Saas	Bahu	Round 1	Round 2	Round 3	Result	Round 1	Round 2	Round 3	Result	Round 1	Round 2	Round 3	Result	Pati	Patni	Pati	Patni	Pati	Patni	Pati	Patni	Team	Round 1	Round 2	Round 3	Result	Round 1	Round 2	Round 3	Result	Boys	Girls	Boys	Girls	Boys	Girls	Boys	Girls	RNBDJ	EDKL	RNBDJ	EDKL	RNBDJ	EDKL	RNBDJ	EDKL	Team Baazigar	Team Don	Team Baazigar	Team Don	Team Baazigar	Team Don	Team Baazigar	Team Don	Round 1	Round 2	Round 3	Final Round	Result
Yeh Rishta Kya Kehlata Hai		Won			Winner					Lost	Lost	Won	Lost	Lost	Won	Lost	Won	Lost	Won	Lost	Winner										Won			Lost	Won	Lost	Won	Lost	Won	Lost	Winner	Ladke wale	Lost	Lost	Lost	Lost	Lost	Lost	Won	Winner									Lost	Won	Won	Lost	Lost	Won	Lost	Winner	Lost	Won	Lost	Won	Lost	Won	Lost	Winner		Won		Winner	Winner
Imlie	Lost									Won	Won	Lost	Winner	Lost	Won	Lost	Won	Lost	Won	Lost	Winner	Won	Won	Lost	Lost						Won			Lost	Won	Lost	Won	Lost	Won	Lost	Winner	Ladke wale	Lost	Lost	Lost	Lost					Won	Lost	Lost	Won	Won	Lost	Winner	Lost	Lost	Won	Won	Lost	Lost	Won	Lost	Winner	Lost	Won	Lost	Won	Lost	Won	Lost	Winner	Won			Lost	1st Runner-up
Anupamaa	Won				Lost	Lost	Won	Won	Winner					Lost	Won	Lost	Won	Lost	Won	Lost	Winner	Lost	Lost	Won	Winner					Won				Lost	Won	Lost	Won	Lost	Won	Lost	Winner	Ladke wale	Lost	Lost	Lost	Lost	Won	Won	Lost	Lost	Won	Lost	Lost	Won	Won	Lost	Winner	Lost	Lost	Won	Won	Lost	Lost	Won	Lost	Winner	Lost	Won	Lost	Won	Lost	Won	Lost	Winner			Won	Lost	2nd Runner-up
Pandya Store		Lost																								Won	Won	Won	Winner	Lost		Won		Lost	Won	Lost	Won	Lost	Won	Lost	Winner	Ladki wale	Won	Won	Won	Winner	Lost	Lost	Lost	Lost	Won	Lost	Lost	Won	Won	Lost	Winner	Lost	Lost	Won	Won	Lost	Lost	Won	Lost	Winner	Lost	Won	Lost	Won	Lost	Won	Lost	Winner			Lost	3rd Runner-up	
Ghum Hai Kisikey Pyaar Meiin			Won		Lost	Won	Lost	Lost	Lost																					Won				Lost	Won	Lost	Won	Lost	Won	Lost	Winner	Ladki wale	Won	Won	Won	Winner					Won	Lost	Lost	Won	Won	Lost	Winner	Lost									Lost	Won	Lost	Won	Lost	Won	Lost	Winner		Lost	4th Runner-up		
Banni Chow Home Delivery				Lost																						Lost	Lost	Lost	Lost		Won											Bride and Groom									Won	Lost	Lost	Won	Won	Lost	Winner	Lost	Lost	Won	Won	Lost	Lost	Won	Lost	Winner	Lost	Won	Lost	Won	Lost	Won	Lost	Winner	Lost	5th Runner-up			
Saath Nibhaana Saathiya 2			Lost																											Won				Dropped (Week 8 onwards)																																													
Yeh Hai Chahatein				Won	Lost									Lost	Won	Lost	Won	Lost	Won	Lost	Winner										Lost	Lost	Eliminated (Week 7)																																														

== Guests ==
Guest(s)	Notes	Episode	Ref.
Ranbir Kapoor and Vaani Kapoor	To Promote Shamshera	5	
Bharti Singh and Haarsh Limbachiyaa	Guest Appearance in Pati vs Patni Special	8	
Akshay Kumar	To Promote Raksha Bandhan	10	
Govinda and Sunita Ahuja	Guest Appearance in Ganesh Chaturthi Special	12	
Kumar Sanu and Shaan	Guest Appearance in Semi Finale Episode	15	
Bharti Singh, Haarsh Limbachiyaa, Megha Chakraborty, Karan Vohra, Seerat Kapoor, Celesti Bairagey, Rajveer Singh	Guest in Grand Finale Episode	16	

== Adaptations ==
Language	Title	Original release	Network(s)	Last Aired	Notes
Tamil	Enkitta Modhaade என்கிட்ட மொதாடே	21 April 2018	Star Vijay	29 September 2019	Original
Hindi	Ravivaar With Star Parivaar रविवार विथ स्टार परिवार	12 June 2022	StarPlus	25 September 2022	Remake
Marathi	Aata Hou De Dhingana आता होऊ दे धिंगाणा	10 September 2022	Star Pravah	Ongoing	Remake
