= Neil Bhatt =

Dancer and Indian television actor

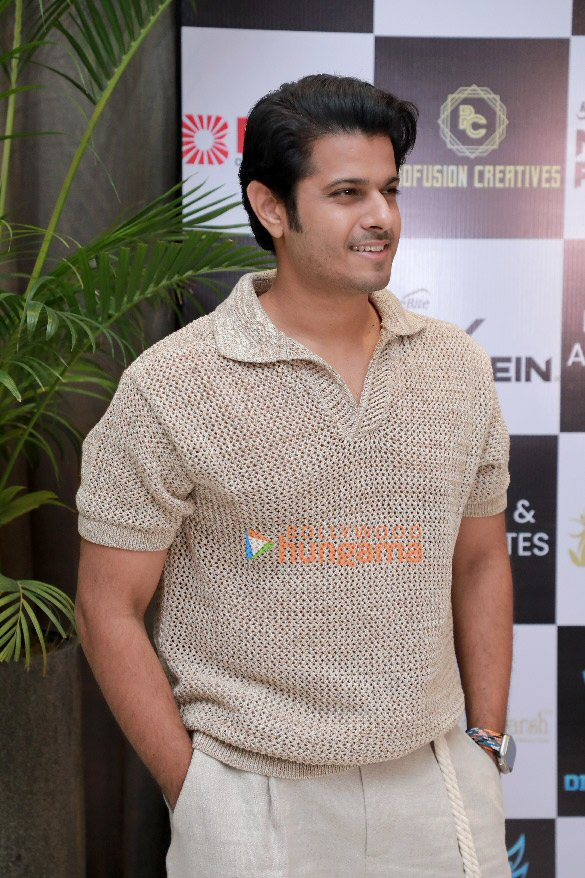
- Neil Bhatt at an event in 2023
- Born: 4 August 1987 (age 39); Vadodara, Gujarat, India
- Occupations: Actor; Dancer
- Years active: 2007–present
- Known for: Arslaan; Diya Aur Baati Hum; Ghum Hai Kisikey Pyaar Meiin; Gulaal; Megha Barsenge
- Spouse: Aishwarya Sharma (m. 2021)
- Parent(s): Sunita and Himanshu Bhatt

Neil Bhatt is an Indian actor and dancer, predominantly known for his work on television. He is a two-time recipient of Gujarat State Awards. He is best known for his role as Ranveer Singh Vaghela in Colors TV's Roop – Mard Ka Naya Swaroop, DCP Virat Chavan in Star Plus's Ghum Hai Kisikey Pyaar Meiin and IAS Arjun Talwar in Colors TV's Megha Barsenge. In 2023, he participated in Bigg Boss 17.

== Early life ==
Born on 4 August 1987 to Sunita and Himanshu Bhatt, Bhatt hails from a Gujarati Brahmin family and was brought up in Mumbai. He has a younger sister Shikha. Bhatt studied law but acting and dance have always been his passion. In an interview to Times of India, he mentioned "education is something which will always stand by him in good stead". He is trained in gymnastics and capoeira, and he reportedly learnt the latter art for a flexible body.

== Personal life ==
In 2020, Bhatt met actress Aishwarya Sharma on the sets of Ghum Hai Kisikey Pyaar Mein and the couple soon fell in love. They announced their engagement on 27 January 2021 and were married on 30 November 2021 in Ujjain.

== Career ==
Bhatt starred in Kaboom a dance reality show as a participant where he won first place. Catapulting to fame through the cult dance show Boogie Woogie, where he has been the winner. His passion led him to one show after the other. He debuted with Arslaan on Sony Television in the year 2008. He became well-known with appearances in serials such as 12/24 Karol Bagh and Gulaal where he played the character of Abhinav Tarneja and Kesar and received praise from audiences and winning his first accolade for the later of Zee Rishtey, Sabse Favorite Naya Sadasya. His performance as Lakshman, the soul of Ram in Ramayan was widely appreciated. The show was immensely popular in Indonesia and hence Bhatt, together with his Ramayan co-stars, was invited to perform in a special stage show and fan meeting tour in Jakarta organised by antv. In the serial he had performed various stunts by himself and choreographed some of the fight sequences.

He has played many challenging roles, one of them being Zakir in Diya Aur Baati Hum which was popular among the wide to an extent that he was called back three times to the show. Owing to the popularity Bhatt was often accompanied along the team for fan fests that took place in Thailand and Dubai. In 2014 he was felicitated by the Gujarati community for his contributions to the entertainment industry as an actor. The actor was awarded the Swargiya Daigauri Ochavlal Joshi Rajat Padak Award by the Mumbai Lunavada Nagar Mandal on Republic Day. He was also seen in a daily soap playing the lead role in Tum Hi Ho Bandhu Sakha Tumhi as Bhushan Pethawala. Where in one of the episode Bhatt learnt magic tricks on the sets and performed it for his character's need. Also seen in episodic series of Zindagi Wins and Pyar Tune Kya Kiya. His debut film Bhanwar is an untold story of a folk puppeteer in modern Gujarat. Where he choreographed the songs and the film won six Gujarat State Awards, two going in the bank of Bhatt for Best Actor Debut (Jury) and Best choreographer. He also won GIFA Best Actor Debut and Transmedia Best Debutant Actor (Judges Choice) for playing the titular role Bhanwar. In 2018, he portrayed the negative role of Ranveer Singh Vaghela in Colors TV's Roop - Mard Ka Naya Swaroop getting him a nomination of Gold Awards, Best Actor in Negative Role. From October 2020 he portrayed DCP Virat Chavan in Star Plus's Ghum Hai Kisikey Pyaar Meiin until the show took its generation leap in June 2023.

In February 2022, he participated in Star Plus's Smart Jodi with his wife Aishwarya Sharma Bhatt. Where in the 3rd week the couple won Jodi Of The Week.

Later in 2023, Neil participated in season 17 of the reality show Bigg Boss 17 along with his wife Aishwarya. He was evicted in 12th place on day 77.

Bhatt portrayed the role of IAS officer Arjun Talwar in Megha Barsenge, a television drama that aired on Colors TV from August 2024 to 26 June 2025. For his portrayal Bhatt received two nominations from Indian Telly Awards 2024 : Best Actor [Popular] and Fan Favorite Actor [Colors TV].

== Filmography ==
=== Television ===
Year	Title	Role	Notes
2008	Kaboom	Contestant	Winner
2008	Boogie Woogie	Contestant	Winner
2008	Arslaan	Arslaan	Lead role
2009	Jo Ishq Ki Marzi Woh Rab Ki Marzi	Sumer/Veer	Lead role
2009–2010	12/24 Karol Bagh	Abhinav Tarneja	Lead role
2011	Gulaal	Kesar	Lead role
2011	Nach Le Ve With Saroj Khan	Contestant	Winner
2012	Gumrah End Of Innocence	Aditya	
2012-2013	Ramayan: Sabke Jeevan Ka Aadhaar	Lakshman	
2013	Savdhaan India	Arjun	Episodic role
2014	Yeh Hai Aashiqui	Pratyush	Episodic role
2013–2015	Diya Aur Baati Hum	IPS Zakir Siddiqui	Supporting role
2015	Zindagi Wins	Avinash	
2015	Tum Hi Ho Bandhu Sakha Tumhi	Bhushan Pethewala	Lead role
2015	Pyaar Tune Kya Kiya 6	Shankar	
2018	Laal Ishq	Aditya/Vinod/Samar	
2018–2019	Roop – Mard Ka Naya Swaroop	Ranveer Singh Vaghela	
2020–2023	Ghum Hai Kisikey Pyaar Meiin	IPS Virat Chavan	Lead role
2022	Smart Jodi	Contestant	5th Position
2022	Ravivaar With Star Parivaar	IPS Virat "Viru/Shiva" Chavan	4th Runner Up
2023	Teri Meri Doriyaann	Narrator	1st episode
2023	Bigg Boss 17	Contestant	12th place
2024–2025	Megha Barsenge	IAS Arjun Talwar	Dual roles Lead role
2025	Megha Barsenge	Kabir Khanna	Dual roles Lead role
2026	Mr. and Mrs. Parshuram	Shiv Prasad Deshmukh alias Agent Parshuram	Lead role

=== Special appearances ===
Year	Show	Role	Ref.
2018	Bigg Boss 12	Ranveer Singh Vaghela	
2021	Dance Plus 6	IPS Virat Chavan	
2024	Dance Deewane 4	Himself	
2024	Suhaagan: Ke Rang Jashn Ke Rang	Himself	
2024	Parineetii	Arjun Talwar	
2024	Suman Indori	Arjun Talwar	

=== Films ===
Year	Title	Role	Language	Ref.
2009	Fast Forward	Dancer	Hindi	
2017	Bhanwar	Bhanwar	Gujarati	

=== Music videos ===
Year	Title	Singer	Ref.
2022	Mann Jogiya	Yasser Desai	
2024	Pyaar Kartey Hain	Payal Dev, Laqshay Kapoor	

== See also ==
- List of dancers
