= Ghum Hai Kisikey Pyaar Meiin =

Indian drama television series

- Ghum Hai Kisikey Pyaar Mein season one montage
- Genre: Family drama
- Developed by: Leena Gangopadhyay
- Written by: Rajesh Chawla
- Screenplay by: Vishal Watwani; Renu Watwani; Laxmi Jaikumar
- Story by: Leena Gangopadhyay
- Directed by: Jaideep Sen; Ashwini Saraswat; Arnav Chakravarti; Jafar Shaikh; Ranjeet Gupta; Rohit Fulari
- Starring: Ayesha Singh; Neil Bhatt; Aishwarya Sharma; Bhavika Sharma; Shakti Arora; Sumit Singh; Hitesh Bharadwaj; Vaibhavi Hankare; Param Singh; Sanam Johar
- Theme music composer: Dhruv Dhalla
- Opening theme: Ghum Hai Kisikey Pyaar Meiin
- Composer: Nishant Pandey
- Country of origin: India
- Original language: Hindi
- No. of seasons: 3
- No. of episodes: 1625

Production
- Producers: Pradeep Kumar; Rajesh Ram Singh; Pia Bajpiee; Shaika Parween
- Cinematography: Shailesh Manore
- Editors: Ashish Singh; Satish Thakur
- Camera setup: Multi-camera
- Running time: 22–25 minutes
- Production companies: Cockcrow Entertainment; Shaika Films

Original release
- Network: Star Plus
- Release: 5 October 2020 – 4 July 2025

Related
- Kusum Dola; Mohor; Yeh Hai Mohabbatein; Phagun Bou

Ghum Hai Kisikey Pyaar Meiin (transl. Lost in Someone's Love) is an Indian Hindi-language television family drama series that aired from 5 October 2020 to 4 July 2025 on Star Plus and streamed on JioHotstar. The show was produced by Cockrow and Shaika Films and was a loose adaptation of Bengali series Kusum Dola. The series starred Ayesha Singh, Neil Bhatt, Aishwarya Sharma in season one, Bhavika Sharma, Shakti Arora, Sumit Singh, Hitesh Bharadwaj and Amayra Khurana in season two , Vaibhavi Hankare, Param Singh and Sanam Johar in final season three.

== Plot ==
=== Season 1 ===
Sai Joshi lives in Gadchiroli with her father, Inspector Kamal Joshi, and wants to pursue medicine at Nagpur Medical College. Virat Chavan, an IPS officer in Nagpur, is posted at Gadchiroli. Before he leaves for his posting, he meets Patralekha "Pakhi" at a retreat, falling in love. In a twist of fate, she gets engaged to Samrat, Virat's cousin, chosen by her parents. Reuniting with Virat, Pakhi decides to break off the engagement, but Virat convinces her otherwise by promising that he will only love her and joins his posting.

In Gadchiroli, Sai's hatred for Virat strengthens when Kamal takes a bullet to save him. As promised to a dying Kamal, Virat proposes an unwilling compromise marriage to Sai, who reluctantly agrees to it. Back in Nagpur, most of the Chavan family refuses to accept their marriage as Sai is not from the upper class. Sai impresses Virat, and he starts falling for her. After a series of misunderstandings and clearances, Sai and Virat confess their love to each other. Soon, Sai is pregnant while Pakhi falls for Samrat, who had returned. Samrat dies while trying to rescue Sai from a kidnapping. Pakhi blames Sai, and she suffers from a miscarriage, becoming incapable of conceiving. Pakhi acts as a surrogate so she can get closer to Virat. She gives birth to a boy, Vinayak, and tries to kill herself. Sai investigates Pakhi's involvement in illegal surrogacy and has her arrested. Sai and Virat fight due to Pakhi's bail, and she leaves the house along with Vinayak. She meets with an accident and the Chavans consider them dead. However, Sai survives and searches for Vinayak but fails. She also discovers that she is miraculously pregnant with her and Virat's daughter, Savi.

7 years later, Sai raises Savi alone in Kankavli. Vinayak, Virat's adopted son with Pakhi, goes camping and meets them. Virat goes to Kankavli and is shocked to see Sai alive. Later, Sai and Savi reach Nagpur for Vinayak's treatment, where the entire family is shocked to see Sai alive. Virat discovers that Vinayak is his own blood, instead of adopted and Savi is also his own daughter. Sai fears that she will be the reason for breaking Pakhi's married life and decides to leave Virat forever. Sai and Satya, a colleague, marry, and Virat is left heartbroken. Pakhi realizes that Virat has never loved her and permanently leaves him. Satya is injured in an accident and his legs are paralyzed. Sai consults the doctors, and they advise her to take Satya to Germany. Sai, Satya and Savi board the plane and see the Chavan family is also on the plane but it is hijacked. Virat and Sai stop the hijackers, and the entire Chavan family and Satya exit safely. However, Sai and Virat are stuck in the plane where they confess their love in their final moments, and the bomb blast kills them.

=== Season 2 ===
14 years later, Savi grows up and wishes to become an IAS officer while Vinayak pursues an MBBS degree in Pune. The Chavans relocate to Ramtek. Meanwhile, in Pune, the managing director of Bhosale Institute of Excellence, Dr. Ishaan Bhosale, and Reeva Marathe are childhood friends who grow closer and decide to get married. Ishaan suffers from trauma as his mother, Isha, left him while he was young to take care of her ailing parents. On their engagement day, Swati blackmails Reeva into flying to London for further studies. Reeva agrees, and Ishaan feels betrayed.

Savi wins a scholarship to Bhosale Institute, but the Chavans fix Savi's marriage with Samruddh Latkar. Before the marriage, Isha tells Savi about his bad character and alcoholism. Savi tells her that the family members, except Bhavani and Vinayak and they help her escape from the wedding. With Isha's help, Savi reaches Pune and, with a lot of difficulties, she is admitted to Bhosale Institute, where Ishaan repeatedly insults her but later apologizes and becomes her mentor. Later, Ishaan confesses his love to Reeva, who returns, after seeing her repent, and proposes to her. An injured Harini requests Ishaan to marry Savi as her last wish after the Chavans die in an explosion caused by Samruddh. A day before Ishaan and Reeva's wedding, Ishaan takes Savi to a temple and marries her. Eventually, Savi learns the truth about her family's death. She leaves the Bhosale house, and Ishaan begins to realize his feelings for Savi. Meanwhile, a corrupt police officer, Bhanwar, becomes obsessed with Savi. On Ishaan and Reeva's wedding day, Ishaan reconciles with Isha, confesses his love for Savi, and Reeva sacrifices her love for Ishaan's happiness and she and Savi come on good terms. After Ishaan and Savi's marriage, Bhanwar attacks Ishaan and Shikha, Ishaan's pregnant cousin-in-law, but Savi takes the bullet meant for Shikha. Bhanwar dies in an altercation, while both Ishaan and Savi are hospitalized. In his dying moments, Ishaan asks Isha and Shantanu to take care of Savi and help her move on, and he passes away.

7 years later, Savi works as a teacher in Mumbai and stays with Isha and Shantanu. She learns that she can never conceive, and meets a young neighbor, Saisha "Sai" Thakkar, becoming friends, but her grandmother, Bhagyashree, and Isha often quarrel. Sai's father, Rajat, is a wealthy businessman and a divorcee who remains distant from Sai due to his resentment towards Ashika, his wife, who left him for a richer businessman, Arsh, and took their son, Kiaan, along with her. Ashika reopens Sai's custody case. Rajat and Savi marry to win custody. Rajat is manipulated into believing that he is being betrayed again. He divorces Savi, but she confronts him and has a car accident, leaving her in a critical state. Luckily, Savi survives, and Rajat tries to win her over again. They confess their love and consummate. Savi takes Kiaan to a gaming competition, where he is kidnapped by Arsh. Kiaan dies, and the Thakkar family and Ashika blame and oust Savi. Savi is miraculously pregnant, while Ashika manipulates Bhagyashree into marrying Rajat with her. In a confrontation, Ashika reveals that she had Kiaan kidnapped, but was not aware that it would lead to his death. Ashika is killed by Arsh while Savi stabs Arsh with a rod. In her final moments, Ashika asks Savi to take care of Sai and find happiness with Rajat. Two years later, Savi, now an IAS officer and mother to a boy, Kiaan Jr, hoists the national flag as Rajat, Sai, and their family cheer.

=== Season 3 ===
In Amravati, Tejaswini is initially inclined towards the popular and arrogant singer Ruturaj, despite her parents, Mohit and Mukta's objections. After a date with Ruturaj in Nagpur, Tejaswini develops feelings for him, but ends up in trouble. She is rescued by Ruturaj's cousin, Dr. Neelkant, alias Neil, who takes her back to Amravati safely and meets Mohit and Mukta, and they instantly like Neelkant. It is revealed that Neil was adopted, and his adoptive parents Leena and Vinod hide this from him. Tejaswini and Ruturaj's relationship is tested when Mohit dies, and Tejaswini, Mukta, and her brother Vedaan learn about Mohit's first wife Laxmi and their daughter Aditi. Tejaswini calls up Ruturaj and asks him to marry her, but he refuses to do so. Coincidentally, Neil's marriage is fixed with Juhi, Tejaswini's cousin. A few days later, Ruturaj meets Tejaswini again in Nagpur and proposes to her, but she rejects him because he was not there during her tough times. After an accident, Neil confesses to Juhi that he loves Tejaswini and that Mohit's dying wish was their marriage. Juhi steps aside, and Tejaswini, under family pressure, marries Neil, only to discover Ruturaj is his cousin. Heartbroken, Ruturaj leaves the wedding. Tejaswini, feeling her life is ruined, resents Neil and enrolls in college. Leena, shocked to see Tejaswini as Neil's wife, insults her. Juhi returns to the house and is insulted by her father, Satish, but the others accept her.

At Neil and Tejaswini's Gondhal ceremony, Mukta learns Neil and Ruturaj are cousins and warns Ruturaj to stay away. Leena doesn't accept Tejaswini due to her own past heartbreak from Mohit. Leena files a complaint against the Chavans and Juhi for replacing the bride. Tejaswini reveals the entire truth about Juhi and Neil's conversation in the hospital to the family, and they take back their complaint. Leena vows to remove Tejaswini from Neil's life, while Ruturaj vows to win her back. The entire family opposes Tejaswini becoming a singer, whereas Neil assures Tejaswini of his support. Later, when Neil is falsely accused of misconduct, Tejaswini proves his innocence and begins to fall for him. Neil goes to a medical camp and is trapped in the landslide. The entire family learns about Tejaswini and Ruturaj's relationship, and they tell her to stay away from Neil. Despite the family's warnings, Tejaswini goes to Konkan to search for Neil. She finds Neil in an injured state and has him admitted to the hospital. Tejaswini confesses her feelings to Neil, but he tells her to go away from her life and breaks all ties with her. Heartbroken, Tejaswini returns to her maternal home, only to be thrown out by Satish, leaving her alone.

One month later, Neil recovers from his injuries and goes out to bring Tejaswini back. Savi, who was an IAS officer in Mumbai, willingly becomes an IPS officer and returns to Nagpur, and is a reflection of Virat. Some members of the Thakkar family shift from Mumbai to Nagpur like Bhagyashree, Riddhi, Tara and her husband Aniket, along with Rajat, Kiaan II, and Sai, leaving the business and family friends. Bhagyashree opposes Savi becoming an IPS officer because she had to shift to Nagpur because of her. Savi handles a bus murder case and is shocked to see Rajat's corpse in the bus, and breaks down at his death. Savi also finds Tejaswini's dead body near Rajat. Neil is shattered upon seeing Tejaswini's dead body. The Thakkars, Pradhans, and Chavans are stunned by the tragedy. When the Pradhans question Tejaswini's character, Neil defends her and reveals that Ruturaj was responsible for their misunderstandings. Savi and Neil swear to prove that their spouses were innocent and were not involved in any affair.

Savi is investigating Tejaswini and Rajat's murder and is kidnapped along with her sister-in-law Riddhi. The kidnapper demands she find an antique necklace to save Riddhi. Meanwhile, Neil is also investigating the murder case and grows suspicious of various clues. Savi's priority shifts to saving Riddhi, and she refuses to help Neil with the investigation. The search for the necklace intensifies, putting Savi in a difficult situation.

They decide to search in Rajat's car and find some rubies. Savi and Neil learn the stones in chocolates aren't rubies. Savi pleads with Maruti, Riddhi's kidnapper, to spare her in exchange for the necklace. Meanwhile, Savi's senior IPS Nitin Manjrekar warns her to stay out of the murder case. Savi agrees to Maruti's money laundering demands and lies to Bhagyashree about Riddhi's safety, saying she's in the USA. Savi then prepares to leave for Switzerland, where she is handed a suspicious bag by a goon at the airport.

== Cast ==
=== Main ===
- Ayesha Singh as Dr. Sai Joshi: Alka and Kamal's daughter; Satya's wife; Virat's ex-wife; Vinayak and Savi's mother; Kiaan Jr's grandmother (2020–2023) (Note: Her husband's surname is Adhikari, her father-in-law's surname is Ghatge, and her ex-husband's surname is Chavan.)
- Neil Bhatt as IPS Virat Chavan: Ashwini and Ninad's son; Sai and Patralekha's ex-husband; Vinayak and Savi's father; Kiaan Jr's grandfather (2020–2023) (Note: Virat Chavan holds the rank of Deputy Commissioner of Police (DCP).)
- Aishwarya Sharma as Patralekha "Pakhi" Mohitepatil Salunkhe (formerly Chavan) (Note: Ex-husband's surname is Chavan.): Vaishali and Shailesh's daughter; Samrat's widow; Virat's second ex-wife (2020–2023)
- Bhavika Sharma as IPS Savi Chavan Thakkar (formerly Bhosale) (Note: Late husband's surname is Bhosale.): Sai and Virat's daughter; Vinayak's sister; Ishaan and Rajat's widow; Kiaan Jr's mother, Kiaan I and Saisha's stepmother (2023–2025; 2025)
  - Aria Sakaria as child Savi (2022–2023)
- Shakti Arora as Dr. Ishaan Bhosale: Dean and managing director of Bhosale Institute of Excellence; Isha and Shantanu's son; Savi's late husband (2023–2024)
  - Arsh Hawaldar as child Ishaan (2023)
- Sumit Singh as Reeva Marathe: Professor at Bhosale Institute of Excellence; Swati and Swanand's daughter (2023–2024)
- Hitesh Bharadwaj as Rajat Thakkar: A businessman; Bhagyashree and Rajendra's elder son; Ashika's ex-husband; Savi's second husband; Saisha, Kiaan and Kiaan Jr.'s father (2024–2025; 2025 (Note: Main in 2024-2025; cameo in 2025.))
- Amayra Khurana as Saisha "Sai" Thakkar: Aashika and Rajat's daughter; Kiaan's sister and Kiaan Jr.'s half-sister (2024–2025; 2025)
- Vaibhavi Hankare as Tejaswini "Teju" Chavan Pradhan: Mukta and Mohit (Season 3)'s daughter (2025)
- Param Singh as Dr. Neelkant Pradhan alias Neil: Leena and Vinod's adopted son (2025)
- Sanam Johar as Ruturaj "Rutu" Rane: A singer; Leena's nephew (Note: Nephew here refers to sister's son or bhanja.) (2025)

=== Recurring ===
==== Joshis ====
- Sanjay Narvekar as Inspector Kamal Joshi: Usha's foster brother (2020; 2021; 2022; 2023)
- Anjana Nathan / Sanjivani Takkar as Usha: Kamal's foster sister (2020–2022) / (2022–2023)

==== Chavans (Season 1) ====
- Kishori Shahane as Bhavani Chavan: Amba's sister (2020–2024)
- Shailesh Datar as Ret. Col. Ninad Chavan: Nagesh, Mansi, Omkar and Shivani's brother; Virat's father (2020–2024)
- Bharati Patil as Ashwini Chavan: Swapna's sister; Virat's mother (2020–2024)
- Mridul Kumar Sinha as Omkar "Omi" Chavan (Season 1): Nagesh, Mansi, Ninad and Shivani's brother; Mohit's father (2020–2023)
- Sheetal Maulik as Sonali Chavan (Season 1): Omkar (Season 1)'s wife ; Mohit's mother (2020–2023)
- Adish Vaidya / Vihan Verma as Mohit Chavan (Season 1): Sonali (Season 1) and Omkar (Season 1)'s son (2020–2021) / (2021–2023)
- Sneha Bhawsar as Karishma Chavan: Mohit's wife (2020–2023)
- Abhishek Kumaarr as Vinayak "Vinu" Chavan: A MBBS student; Sai and Virat's son (2023–2024)
  - Tanmay Rishi Shah as child Vinayak (2022–2023)
  - Arham as baby Vinayak (2022)

==== Deshpandes ====
- Mitali Nag as Devyani "Devi" Chavan Deshpande: Bhavani and Nagesh's daughter (2020–2022)
- Yash Pandit as Dr. Pulkit Deshpande: Madhuri's foster brother (2021–2023)
- Tejasvi Khatal as Madhuri Patil: Pulkit's foster sister (2021)

==== Salunkhes ====
- Dimple Shaw Chauhan / Roopa Divetia as Manasi Chavan Salunkhe: Nagesh, Ninad, Omkar and Shivani's sister; Patraleka's first husband (2020–2021) / (2021–2022)
- Yogendra Singh as Samrat "Jiva" Salunkhe: Manasi and Ashok's son (2020; 2021–2022)

==== Luthras ====
- Yamini Malhotra / Tanvi Thakkar as Shivani Chavan Luthra: Nagesh, Mansi, Ninad and Omkar's sister (2020–2021) / (2021–2023)
- Sachin Shroff as Rajeev Luthra: Anuradha's brother (2022)
- Sonia Singh as Anuradha Luthra: Rajeev's sister (2022)

==== Adhikaris ====
- Harshad Arora as Dr. Satya Adhikari: Amba and Vijayendra's son (2023)
- Sanyogeeta Bhave as Amba Adhikari Ghatge: Bhavani's sister (2023)
- Priya Ahuja as Madhura "Maddy" Adhikari: Satya's foster sister (2023)
- Zubeda Verma as Jigyasa Adhikari: Satya's foster grandmother (2023)
- Deepali Kamat as Gauri Adhikari: Satya's foster aunt (2023)
- Ravindra Mankani as C.P. Vijayendra "Viju" Ghatge: Kamal's friend; Amba's husband (2023)

==== Bhosales ====
- Manasi Salvi as Dr. Isha Bhosale: A teacher; Shantanu's wife (2023–2025)
- Indraneel Bhattacharya as Shantanu Bhosale: Yashwant and Nishikant's brother (2023–2025)
- Nimai Bali as Yashwant "Rao Saheb" Bhosale: Patriarch of Bhosles; Shantanu and Nishikant's brother (2023–2024)
- Vaishali Thakkar as Surekha "Akka Saheb" Deshmukh Bhosale: Mukul's sister (2023–2024)
- Astha Agarwal as Shikha Shinde Bhosale: Chinmay's wife (2023–2024)
- Vijhay Badlaani as Nishikant "Nishi" Bhosale: Yashwant and Shantanu's brother (2023–2024)
- Minal Bal as Asmita Bhosale: Nishikant's wife (2023–2024)
- Nandini Tiwari as Dhurva Bhosale: Nishikant and Asmita's elder daughter (2023–2024)
- Purnima Tiwari as Anvi Bhosale: Nishikant and Asmita's younger daughter (2023–2024)
- Ayush Anand as Chinmay "Chinu" Bhosale: Yashwant and Surekha's son (2024)

==== Sawants ====
- Udit Shukla as Kiran Sawant: Ramesh and Susheela's son (2023–2024)
- Raman Khatri as Ramesh Sawant: Susheela's husband (2023–2024)
- Unknown as Susheela Sawant: Ramesh's wife (2023–2024)

==== Yadavs ====
- Ankita Khare as Harini Deshpande Yadav: Devyani and Pulkit's daughter (2023–2025)
  - Yesha Harsora as teenage Harini (2022–2023)
  - Hirva Trivedi as child Harini (2021–2022)
- Anuj Khurana as Milind Yadav: Urmila's elder son (2024–2025)
- Shivansh Bhanushali as Vansh Yadav: Harini and Milind's son (2024–2025)
- Aman Maheshwari as Nikhil Yadav: Urmila's younger son (2024)

==== Thakkars ====
- Pallavi Pradhan as Bhagyashree "Shree" Thakkar: Rajendra's wife (2024–2025)
- Sagar Saini as Rajendra "Raju" Thakkar: Bhagyashree's husband (2024–2025)
- Priya Mishra as Tara Thakkar: Bhagyashree and Rajendra's elder daughter (2024–2025)
- Mousumi Debnath / Vandana Rao as Riddhi Thakkar: Bhagyashree and Rajendra's younger daughter (2024–2025) / (2025)
- Aasim Khan as Lucky Thakkar: Bhagyashree and Rajendra's younger son (2024–2025)
- Nirbhay Thakur as Kiaan І Thakkar: Aashka and Rajat's son (2024–2025)
- Unknown as Kiaan ІІ Thakkar: Savi and Rajat's son (2025)

==== Solankhis ====
- Kaveri Priyam as Aashka Solanki: Aman's sister (2024–2025)
- Varun Jain as Aman Solanki: Aashka's brother (2024–2025)
- Shikha Pandey as Mrunmayee "Mrunu" Solanki: Lata's daughter (2024–2025)

==== Chavans 2.0 ====
- Abhay Bhargava as Omkar Chavan: Patriarch of Chavans; Sonali's husband (2025)
- Minal Karpe as Sonali Chavan: Omkar's wife (2025)
- Mahesh Thakur as Mohit Chavan: Omkar and Sonali's elder son (2025)
- Sai Deodhar as Mukta Chavan: Mohit's second widow (2025)
- Hemaakshi Ujjain as Laxmi Chavan: Mohit's first widow (2025)
- Sameeksha Sud as Aditi Chavan: Laxmi and Mohit's daughter (2025)
- Hassan Syed as Vedant "Vedu" Chavan: Mohit and Mukta's son (2025)
- Vinayak Bhave as Satish Chavan: Omkar and Sonali's younger son (2025)
- Meera Sarang as Deepali Chavan: Satish's wife (2025)
- Mrunali Shirke as Juhi Chavan: Satish and Deepali's elder daughter (2025)
- Tisha Kapoor as Prajakta "Praju" Chavan: Satish and Deepali's younger daughter (2025)

==== Pradhans ====
- Ashok Lokhande as Bhushan Pradhan: Patriarch of Pradhans; Vinod, Jitendra and Alok's brother (2025)
- Neetha Shetty as Manjiri Pradhan: Bhushan's daughter (2025)
- Aditya Deshmukh as Amey Pradhan: Bhushan's son (2025)
- Priya Sharma as Nandini Pradhan: Amey's wife (2025)
- Rajeev Kumar as Vinod Pradhan: Bhushan, Jitendra and Alok's brother (2025)
- Chaitrali Gupte as Leena Pradhan: Vinod's wife (2025)
- Anchal Soni / Tanvi Nimbhorkar as Prachi Pradhan: Leena and Vinod's daughter (2025)
- Shivendraa Om Saainiyol as Jitendra Pradhan: Bhushan, Vinod and Alok's brother (2025)
- Sharhaan Singh as Alok Pradhan: Bhushan, Vinod and Jitendra's brother (2025)
- Neetu Wadhwa as Amrita Pradhan: Alok's wife (2025)
- Aiman Kalia as Yash Pradhan: Amrita and Alok's son (2025)

==== Other characters ====
- Vishavpreet Kaur as Vaishali Mohitepatil: Shailesh's wife (2020–2022)
- Atul Mahajan as Shailesh Mohitepatil: Vaishali's husband (2020–2022)
- Siddharth Bodke as Advocate Jagtap Mane: A goon-turned-advocate; Vitthal's son (2020; 2022–2023; 2024)
- Ganesh Yadav as Vitthal Damodar Mane: Jagtap's father (2020; 2022)
- Jeetendra Trehan as Ret. DIG Sanjeev K. Salaskar of Nagpur: Virat's senior officer (2020–2023; 2024)
- Jitendra Bohara as Sunny: Virat and Sada's best friend (2020–2021; 2023)
- Jia Sheth as Pari: Sai's best friend (2020)
- Bhagya Bhanushali as Balakram: Sai's best friend (2020)
- Shalini Singh as Neha: Patralekha's best friend (2020)
- Pankaj Vishnu as Inspector Pawar (2020–2023)
- Rakesh Rajwant as Officer Gopal Shinde (2020–2023)
- Deepak Soni as Inspector Sachin Kadam (2020)
- Kushagre Dua as Amey Gupte: Sarita's husband (2021)
- Aditya Bansal as Milind: Sai's college friend (2021)
- Riddhi Gupta as Sandhya: Sai's college friend (2021)
- Deepali Pansare as Barkha Rani Wagh: A celebrity Lavani dancer from Sai's village Gadchiroli (2021)
- Ami Joshi as Aishwarya: Sai's college friend (2021)
- Suraj Sonik as Aniket More: Sai's best friend (2021)
- Keshav Ashwani as Sai's college friend (2021)
- Yash Abbad as Sai's college friend (2021)
- Gajendra Chauhan as Dean of Nagpur City Medical College (2021)
- Dolly Minhas as Dr. Anjali: Sai's psychiatrist (2021; 2022)
- Sunila Karambelkar as Swapna: Ashwini's sister (2021)
- Nivaan Sen / Vineet Kumar Chaudhary as Sadanand "Sada" Pawle: A Naxalite; Virat's friend; Shruti's husband (2021) / (2022)
- Shafaq Naaz as Shruti Pawle: A Naxalite; Sada's wife (2021–2022)
- Jiten Lalwani as Dr. Machindra Thorat: Sai's senior (2022)
- Abhineet Kaushik as Bhau: a goon (2022)
- Ribbhu Mehra as D.M. Harish Vyas (2022)
- Siraj Mustafa Khan as Tony: A robber (2022)
- Syed Zafar Ali as Dr. Survase: Sai and Satya's senior doctor (2023)
- Moon Banerjee as Geetanjali Pujari: Ramakant's wife (2023)
- Manish Khanna as Ramakant Pujari: Geetanjali's husband (2023)
- Siddharth Dhawan as Bheema Pujari (2023)
- Nirjar Patel as Terrorist (2023)
- Jiya Rao as Air Hostess (2023)
- Muni Jha as Advocate Swanand Marathe: Swati's husband (2023–2024)
- Aradhana Uppal as Swati Marathe: Swanand's wife (2023–2024)
- Madhvendra Jha as Ram Narayan Shukla: Ishaan's employee; Sandhya's husband (2023–2024)
- Umesh Ghadge as Mandar Latkar: Local goon of Ramtek; Samruddh's father (2023–2024)
- Paaras Madaan as Samruddh Latkar: A drunkard and womanizer; Mandar's son (2023–2024)
- Rishi Saxena as ACP Bajirao Rane: Shantanu's former student (2023–2024)
- Tannaz Irani as Roopa Romanchak: Murder Mystery's writer (2023)
- Solanki Ghosh as Sara: Dhurva's friend (2023–2024)
- Saim Khan as Ayush Barwe: Dhurva's friend (2023–2024)
- Aman Kakani as Shashwat: Savi's friend (2023–2024)
- Prachi Singla as Prachi: Dhurva's friend (2023–2024)
- Meena Singla as Sandhya Shukla: Ram Narayan Shukla's wife (2024)
- Manek Bedi as Mukul Deshmukh: Surekha's brother (2024)
- Priyambda Singh as Apsara Deshmukh: Mukul's wife (2024)
- Karanvir Bohra as Inspector Bhanwar Patil: Savi's one sided obsessive lover; murdered Ishaan (2024)
- Ankit Arora as Arsh Gujral: Ashika's ex-lover; murdered Ashika and Kiaan (2024–2025)
- Kaveri Ghosh as Lata: Mrunmayee's mother (2024)
- Trishaan Maini as Jigar Patel: Tara's ex-husband (2024–2025)
- Unknown as Shakti "Nia" Patel: Jigar and Tara's daughter (2024–2025)
- Sheezan Khan as Anubhav "Bhavi" Deshmukh: Savi's childhood friend (2024–2025)
- Ajay Chaudhary as Shrichand Goyal: Rajat's business partner and rival; Chirag's father (2025)
- Abhishek Singh as IPS Nitin Manjrekar: Savi's senior (2025)
- Unknown as Maruti: Riddhi's kidnapper-turned-love-interest (2025)
  - Unknown as child Maruti (2025)
- Unknown as Nagaraj: Riddhi's kidnapper (2025)
- Unknown as Chirag Goyal: Shrichand's son (2025)

=== Guest appearances ===
- Adrija Roy as Imlie Rana Pratap Reddy / Imlie Rana Singh Chaudhary from Imlie as guests in Ram Navami Special (2024) / (2024)
- Sai Ketan Rao as Surya Pratap Reddy / Surya Singh Chaudhary from Imlie as guests in Ram Navami Special (2024) / (2024)
- Jaya Bhattacharya as Indira Reddy from Imlie as guests in Ram Navami Special (2024)
- Kanwar Dhillon as Sachin Deshmukh from Udne Ki Aasha (2024) (2025)
- Neha Harsora as Sailee Jadhav / Sailee Jadhav Deshmukh from Udne Ki Aasha (2024) / (2025)
- Rutuja Bagwe as Vaijyanti to promote Maati Se Bandhi Dor (2024)
- Shaan as guest in Savi and Rajat's wedding (2024)
- Ankit Gupta as Ranvijay from Maati Se Bandhi Dor (2024)

== Production ==
=== Controversy ===
In July 2022, a lawsuit against the series makers was filed at IBF by some viewers against the then-ongoing surrogacy track where viewers claimed that Pakhi was shown becoming a surrogate mother through an illegal procedure.

=== Casting ===
In May 2023, Aishwarya Sharma Bhatt, who portrayed one of the key characters Patralekha, quit the series "to explore new opportunities" after a period of 2.5 years.

In May 2023, it was confirmed that the show was taking a generation leap and thus all the cast would be making their exit from the show except Kishori Shahane, Bharati Patil and Shailesh Datar who would remain on the show in a lesser capacity. Their roles ended in the show in January 2024 due to the track revolving around Savi and Ishaan's wedding which resulted in their characters' deaths. Shakti Arora, Bhavika Sharma & Sumit Singh were finalised to play the lead roles as Ishaan, Savi & Reeva post leap. Sumit Singh's character was initially named Sharvari in pre-production phase, later it being transformed to Reeva.

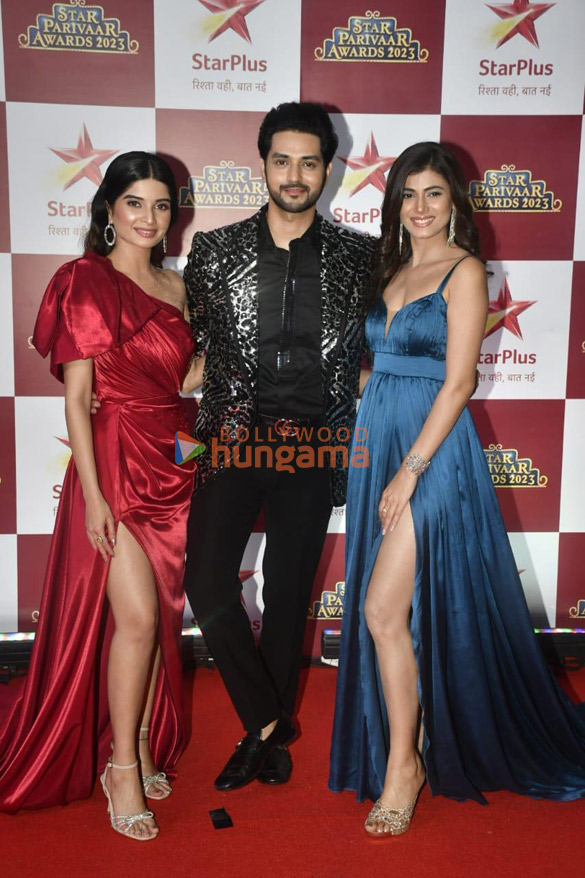
Sharma, Arora and Singh at Star Parivaar Awards 2023

Shakti Arora also revealed that he was approached initially to play the role of Virat Chavan which he declined due to budget issues. Arora on joining the show said, "I treat every show like it is my debut show; excitement and jitters go hand in hand with every new show I venture in." Bhavika Sharma, on the other hand, said, "I am very excited and grateful, but at the same time nervous because ‘Ghum Hain Kisikey Pyaar Meiin’ already holds a legacy with itself; The show has set a benchmark, and we really hope to reach that height. We have mixed emotions with a touch of nervousness and happiness." In June 2024, after another leap of 7 years, Hitesh Bharadwaj replaced Shakti Arora as the lead actor. In May 2025, Ajay Chaudhary joined the show as Shrichand Goyal.

=== Development ===
The filming of the series began in September 2020. Mainly filmed in Mumbai, some initial sequences of the series were shot at Nashik.

In March 2021, the filming was halted for a few days when Neil Bhatt and a crew member tested positive for COVID-19 virus, leading to a change in the track.

On 13 April 2021, Chief Minister of Maharashtra announced a curfew from 15 April. On 16 and 17 April, the team shifted filming to Goa for a few weeks until the government issued a confirmation to resume shooting in Mumbai.

Due to the COVID-19 pandemic, Uddhav Thackeray announced that shooting of all shows must halt within all parts of urban and rural Maharashtra. Hence, Ghum Hai Kisikey Pyaar Meiin producers moved to Goa and were permitted by the government to only shoot indoors, inside their bio-bubble. Everything proceeded as planned, but in May 2021 the producers shot a scene at Goa Fort, violating the regulations.

In May 2024 it was rumoured that show would take a 10-year leap but then it was announced that it has been cancelled. In June 2024, it was confirmed that show was indeed taking a leap and that the entire Bhosale family would exit including leads Shakti Arora and Sumit Singh.

In January 2025, it was announced that the show will see a shift in the storyline. Bhavika Sharma, Hitesh Bharadwaj and other cast marked their exit due to the shift in the storyline.

Due to declining TRPs and the third season not being well received by the audience, the production team decided in April 2025 to revamp the storyline and replace the current female lead, Vaibhavi Hankare, with the former lead, Bhavika Sharma. Hankare's character was killed off in a high-octane dramatic track as part of the revamp.

=== Filming ===
A massive fire broke out on the sets of the show located in Goregaon Film City on 10 March 2023 around 4:30 pm. It was reported that nearly 2000 people were present when the accident took place. Earlier reported to be fire from a cylinder blast later reports claimed that a short circuit happened due to a technical failure in a scheduled fire sequence. No casualties were reported however it was reported that whole set has been burnt down to ashes and the fire even reached the neighbouring sets of Ajooni and Teri Meri Doriyaann.

=== Release ===
The first promo of the series was released on 12 September 2020 featuring then-leads Ayesha Singh and Neil Bhatt. The promo was released on 1 October 2020 and featured veteran actress Rekha promoting the series. The following promo released before premiere featured Deepika Singh in her character Sandhya Rathi from Diya Aur Baati Hum to promote the series.

On 4 August 2021, Rekha made an appearance in a teaser to promote the track of Sai and Virat's outdoor trip as well as Samrat's return to the series.

On 23 June 2023, A promo featuring Rekha again was released promoting the second generation leap.

In January 2025, Rekha made another appearance to promote the shift in the storyline.

On 1 May 2025, A promo confirming the return of Bhavika Sharma to the series was released, featuring the deaths of Tejaswini and Rajat.

== Crossovers ==
On 17 April 2024, Ghum Hai Kisikey Pyaar Meiin aired one-hour Ram Navami special episode and had a crossover with Imlie wherein Imlie Reddy, Surya and Indira from Imlie attended the celebrations. This episode is placed under regular episodes tray in JioHotstar.

On 27 May 2024, Ghum Hai Kisikey Pyaar Meiin aired one-and-a-half-hour special episode and had a crossover with Udne Ki Aasha wherein Savi-Ishaan and Sayali-Sachin rush to a hill-top temple together. This episode is placed under Mahasangam tray in JioHotstar.

On 9 September 2024, Ghum Hai Kisikey Pyaar Meiin aired one-hour Ganesh Chaturthi special episode and had a crossover with Maati Se Bandhi Dor wherein Vaiju-Ranvijay from Maati Se Bandhi Dor attended the celebrations and Vaiju saved Sai's life by donating her blood. This episode is placed under regular episodes tray in JioHotstar.

On 14 March 2025, Ghum Hai Kisikey Pyaar Meiin aired one-hour Holi special episode and had a crossover with Iss Ishq Ka... Rabb Rakha with the event hosted by Gaurav Khanna. This episode is placed under Mahasangam tray in JioHotstar.

On 9 June 2025, Ghum Hai Kisikey Pyaar Meiin aired one-hour special episode Manoranjan Ka Mahasangam and had a crossover with Udne Ki Aasha and Jaadu Teri Nazar – Daayan Ka Mausam wherein Savi-Neil, Sayali-Sachin and Gauri-Vihaan rush to Lal Tekdi temple. This episode is placed under Mahasangam tray in JioHotstar.

== Television special ==
=== Ravivaar With Star Parivaar (2022) ===
The cast of Ghum Hai Kisikey Pyaar Meiin participated as a team in the musical game show Ravivaar With Star Parivaar. It competed with the teams of Star Plus's other shows. Ghum Hai Kisikey Pyaar Meiin emerged as the 4th runner-up of the show.

== Soundtrack ==
Ghum Hai Kisikey Pyaar Meiin Original SoundTrack

Soundtrack album by Dhruv Dhalla
- Released: 2021
- Genre: Romance Soundtrack
- Length: 30:00
- Language: Hindi
- Label: Star India
- Producers: Pradeep Kumar; Rajesh Ram Singh; Pia Bajpiee; Shaika Parween

The title song "Ghum Hai Kisikey Pyaar Meiin" is a remake of the song "Ghum Hai Kisi ke Pyar Mein" from the 1972 film Raampur Ka Lakshman, originally composed by R.D. Burman, written by Majrooh Sultanpuri and sung by Lata Mangeshkar and Kishore Kumar. The song was recreated for the series, with the music composed by Dhruv Dhalla.

== Awards and nominations ==
Year	Award	Category	Recipient	Role	Result	Ref.
2022	Indian Television Academy Awards	Best Actress in a Negative Role	Kishori Shahane	Bhavani Chavan	Won	
2022	Indian Television Academy Awards	Best Actor in a Negative Role	Siddharth Bodke	Jagtap Mane	Nominated	
2022	22nd Indian Television Academy Awards	Popular Actress (Drama)	Ayesha Singh	Dr. Sai Joshi Adhikari	Nominated	
2022	22nd Indian Television Academy Awards	Popular Actress (Drama)	Aishwarya Sharma Bhatt	Patralekha Mohitepatil Salunkhe	Nominated	
2022	22nd Indian Television Academy Awards	Popular Actor (Drama)	Neil Bhatt	IPS Virat Chavan	Nominated	
2022	22nd Indian Television Academy Awards	Popular Serial (Drama)	Ghum Hai Kisikey Pyaar Meiin	–	Nominated	
2023	Indian Telly Awards	Best Actress in a Negative Role - Jury	Kishori Shahane	Bhavani Chavan	Won	
2023	Indian Telly Awards	Most Promising Actress	Ayesha Singh	Dr. Sai Joshi Adhikari	Won	
