= Fattegad =

Fort in Ratnagiri district, Maharashtra, India

Fattegad Fort
- Part of Konkan Coast
- Ratnagiri district, Maharashtra

Site information
- Type: Sea Fort
- Owner: Government of India
- Controlled by: Maratha Empire (1670-1818); United Kingdom: East India Company (1818-1857); British Raj (1857-1947); India (1947-)
- Open to the public: Yes
- Condition: Ruins

Location
- Shown within Maharashtra
- Coordinates: 17°48′55.9″N 73°05′26.2″E
- Height: MSL.

Site history
- Materials: Laterite Stone

Fattegad is a fort located 15 km from Dapoli, in the Ratnagiri district of Maharashtra. It is one of three forts built to guard the Suvarnadurg fort; the other two are Goa fort and Kanakdurg.

== History ==
The fort was built by Khairiyat Khan during the Shivaji era. This fort was under the control of Tulaji Angre. Due to the rivalry between Peshwa and Tulaji, a combined efforts were made by British and the Peshwa against Tulaji. The fort was captured by Captain James and handed over to Peshwas. In 1817, British forces captured the fort from the Peshwas.

== Nearby places ==
The nearest town is Dapoli. The fort is at walkable distance from the Harne town. A wide motorable road leads to the entrance gate of the fort. It takes about half an hour to have a walk around the fort.

== Appearance ==
The fort is in a dilapidated state. The only parts of the fort left standing are the walls and the bridge joining with Kanakdurg.

== See also ==
- List of forts in Maharashtra
- List of forts in India
- Kanhoji Angre
- Marathi People
- Maratha Navy
- List of Maratha dynasties and states
- Maratha War of Independence
- Battles involving the Maratha Empire
- Military history of India
