= Aoora =

South Korean musician (born 1986)

- Born: 10 January 1986 (age 40); Seoul, South Korea
- Occupations: Rapper; singer; songwriter; music producer
- Years active: 2001–present
- Honours: Global creator of the year by Filmfare ME
- Musical career
- Also known as: Aoora
- Genres: K-pop; R&B fusion Indian
- Instrument: Vocals

Korean name
- Hangul: 박민준
- RR: Bak Minjun
- MR: Pak Minjun

Park Min-jun (Korean: 박민준; born 10 January, 1986), better known by his stage name Aoora (아우라), is a South Korean rapper, singer, songwriter and composer. He was a member of the K-pop group AA (Double A) that debuted in 2011.

Min-jun left AA in 2016 to pursue a solo career. His solo ventures spanned genres such as pop, R&B, and electronic dance music. His song "Because I'm Crazy" garnered positive attention upon its release.

In September 2023, Min-jun and fellow K-pop artist DJ Fridayy performed multiple concerts in India to celebrate the 50th anniversary of diplomatic relations between India and South Korea. He was a participant on the Indian reality show Bigg Boss Season 17.

== Career ==
Min-jun began his career as a K-pop idol in the boy band AA in 2011. He started his solo career as a music producer in 2014. In May 2016, he left AA. In 2023, he began working in India's music industry.

He was the first Korean participant in India's reality show Bigg Boss season 17. He also appeared on Jhalak Dikhhla Jaa season 11 in January 2024.

== Television ==
Year	Serial	Role	Notes	Ref.
2022	First Love Again			
2023–2024	Bigg Boss 17	Wild-card contestant	10th place (evicted on Day 84)	
2024	Jhalak Dikhla Jaa 11	Himself	Guest	

== Discography ==
=== Singles ===
Song	Year	Ref
Body Party	2014	
Vanilla Sky	2014	
Morning Noon Evening	2015	
Moonlight Bloom	2016	
Slay	2017	
Blue Ocean	2018	
Harder	2018	
Twerk	2020	
Firework	2022	
Jimmy Jimmy K-Pop Version	2023	
Auva Auva K-Pop Version	2023	
Holi Re Rasiya	2024	
Oi Nasoni	2024	
Seoul	2024	
Thi Thi Thara (Kuttanadan Dreams)	2024	

=== Filmography ===
Song	Year	Movie	Ref
"We Keep Rockin'"	2026	Made in Korea	
