= Aishwarya Sharma =

Indian television actress (born 1992)

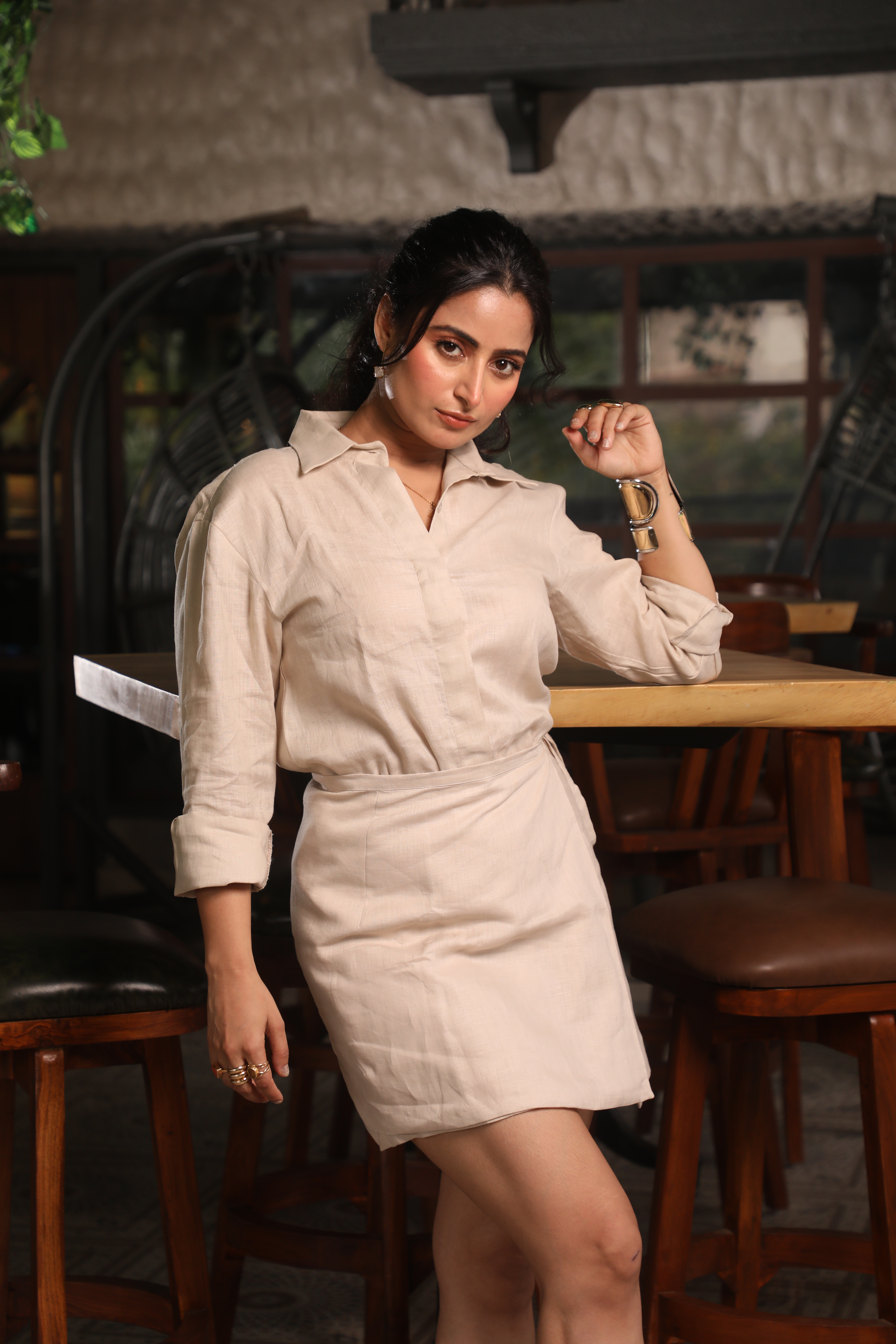
- Aishwarya Sharma in 2025
- Born: 8 December 1992 (age 33); Ujjain, Madhya Pradesh, India
- Education: Rajiv Gandhi Technical University
- Occupations: Actress; Dancer
- Years active: 2015–present
- Known for: Ghum Hai Kisikey Pyaar Meiin; Fear Factor: Khatron Ke Khiladi 13; Bigg Boss 17
- Spouse: Neil Bhatt (m. 2021)

Aishwarya Sharma (born 8 December 1992) is an Indian actress and classical dancer known for her work in Hindi television shows. She is best known for her portrayal of Patralekha "Pakhi" Mohitepatil in Star Plus's romantic drama Ghum Hai Kisikey Pyaar Meiin. In 2023, she participated in reality shows Khatron Ke Khiladi 13 and Bigg Boss 17.

== Early life ==
Sharma was born on 8 December 1992 in Mahidpur, Ujjain, Madhya Pradesh. She completed her graduation in Electronics and Communication engineering from Rajiv Gandhi Technical University, Bhopal. She then pursued her graduation in Kathak Dance from Indira Kala Sangeet Vishwavidyalaya.

== Career ==
Sharma started her acting career in 2014 with an episodic appearance in Colors TV's Code Red. The same year, she played the role of Jamvanthi in Sankat Mochan Mahabali Hanumaan. She later appeared in various television series, including Suryaputra Karn, Bal Krishna and Janbaaz Sindbad.

Sharma starred as Patralekha "Pakhi" Mohitepatil in Ghum Hai Kisikey Pyaar Meiin from 2020 to 2023 alongside Ayesha Singh and Neil Bhatt. It proved to be her breakthrough role and she and Bhatt got married while doing it. In 2023, she quit the series, and participated in Fear Factor: Khatron Ke Khiladi 13 and emerged as the 2nd runner-up. Then, she participated with her husband Neil Bhatt in Bigg Boss 17, where she was evicted at the 14th position on Day 70.

== Personal life ==
Sharma met actor Neil Bhatt while working on the television series Ghum Hai Kisikey Pyaar Meiin. The couple got engaged on 27 January 2021 and got married on 30 November 2021 in Ujjain.

== Filmography ==
=== Television ===
Year	Title	Role	Notes	Ref.
2015	Code Red	Unnamed		
2015	Sankat Mochan Mahabali Hanumaan	Jamwanthi		
2015–2016	Suryaputra Karn	Urvashi		
2015–2016	Janbaaz Sindbad	Ameen's mother		
2016–2017	Baal Krishna	Putana		
2017	Meri Durga	Amrita Chaudhary		
2019	Laal Ishq	Saundarya		
2019	Tenali Rama	Mandakini		
2019	Surajya Sanhita	Vishpala		
2020–2023	Ghum Hai Kisikey Pyaar Meiin	Patralekha "Pakhi" Mohitepatil	Negative lead	
2022	Ravivaar With Star Parivaar	Patralekha "Pakhi" Mohitepatil		
2022	Smart Jodi	Contestant		
2023	Fear Factor: Khatron Ke Khiladi 13	Contestant	3rd place	
2023	Bigg Boss 17	Contestant	14th place	

=== Guest appearances ===
Year	Title	Role	Ref.
2024	Dance Deewane 4	Herself	
2024	Suhaagan: Ke Rang Jashn Ke Rang	Herself	

=== Web series ===
Year	Title	Role	Ref.
2020	Madhuri Talkies	Punita	

=== Music videos ===
Year	Title	Singer	Ref.
2022	Mann Jogiya	Yasser Desai	
2024	Pyaar Kartey Hain	Payal Dev, Laqshay Kapoor	

== See also ==
- List of Hindi television actresses
- List of Indian television actresses
