= Shubhvivah =

2023 Indian Marathi-language TV series

- Genre: Drama
- Written by: Shirish Latkar; Mithila Subhash
- Directed by: Aniruddh Shinde
- Starring: See below
- Country of origin: India
- Original language: Marathi
- No. of episodes: 1005

Production
- Producers: Mahesh Tagde; Jitendra Gupta
- Production locations: Mumbai, Maharashtra, India
- Cinematography: Vinayak Jadhav
- Editor: Narpat Chaudhari
- Camera setup: Multi-camera
- Running time: 22 minutes
- Production company: Tell-a-Tale Media

Original release
- Network: Star Pravah
- Release: 16 January 2023 – 1 March 2026

Related
- Chelleli Kapuram

Shubhvivah (transl. Auspicious Marriage) is an Indian Marathi language drama television series. It stars Yashoman Apte and Madhura Deshpande in lead roles. It is produced under the banner of Tell-a-Tale Media. It premiered from 16 January 2023 on Star Pravah by replacing Mulgi Zali Ho. It is an official remake of Telugu TV series Chelleli Kapuram.

== Plot ==
Circumstances force Bhumi, a simple girl to marry Akash, who suffers from age regression.

== Cast ==
=== Main ===
- Yashoman Apte as Aakash Jagannath Mahajan
- Madhura Deshpande as Bhumi Aakash Mahajan / Bhumi Madhav Desai

=== Recurring ===
- Abhijeet Shwetachandra / Siddhesh Prabhakar as Abhijit Rajaram Patwardhan / Baldev Naik
- Kunjika Kalvint/ Varrsha Rani Patel as Pournima Abhijit Patwardhan / Pournima Madhav Desai
- Akshay Jadhav as Atharva Rajaram Patwardhan
- Kajal Patil as Manasi Madhav Desai / Manasi Atharva Patwardhan
- Vishakha Subhedar as Ragini Rajaram Patwardhan
- Apurva Nemlekar as Apurva Purohit
- Sheetal Shukla as Surekha "Aaji" Mahajan
- Mrunal Deshpande as Nilambari Madhav Desai
- Ruchir Gurav as Prashant Madhav Desai
- Vijay Patwardhan as Rajaram Patwardhan
- Manoj Kolhatkar as Madhav Desai
- Shreyas Raje as Paritosh Avasthi
- Pooja Purandare as Avani Avasthi
- Pratiksha Mungekar as Soniya
- Rajesh Salvi as Raghu
- Gargi Phule as Akka
- Madhuri Bharati as Geetanjali Vedpathak
- Chinmay Udgirkar as Sankarshan Adhikari
