= Goa Fort =

Fort in Maharashtra, India

- Part of Konkan Coast
- Ratnagiri district, Maharashtra

Site information
- Type: Sea Fort
- Owner: Government of India
- Controlled by: Maratha Empire (1670–1818); United Kingdom: East India Company (1818–1857); British Raj (1857–1947); India (1947-)
- Open to the public: Yes
- Condition: Ruins

Location
- Shown within Maharashtra
- Coordinates: 17°48′55.9″N 73°05′26.2″E
- Height: MSL.

Site history
- Materials: Laterite Stone

Goa Fort is a fort located 15 km from Dapoli, in Ratnagiri district, of Maharashtra. This fort is one of the three forts built to guard the Suvarnadurg fort, the other two forts are Kanakdurg and Fattedurg. The fort is a main tourist attraction in the Harne village. A favourite evening haunt for the thrill likers to chill out, Chapora Fort in North Goa is yet another popular destination for the patrons.

== History ==
Much less history is known about this fort. In 1862 it is reported that there were 19 cannons and 200 soldiers on the fort.

== How to reach ==
The nearest town is Dapoli. The fort is at walkable distance from the Harne town. A wide motorable road leads to the entrance gate of the fort. It takes about half an hour to have a walk around the fort.

== Places to see ==
There are two entrance gate in the fort. One facing the landward side and the other facing the sea. There are various sculptures on the walls of the fort. There are remains of the collector's rest house on the fort.

== See also ==
- List of forts in Maharashtra
- List of forts in India
- Kanhoji Angre
- Marathi People
- Maratha Navy
- List of Maratha dynasties and states
- Maratha War of Independence
- Battles involving the Maratha Empire
- Military history of India
