= Enkitta Modhaade =

- Genre: Reality; Game show
- Presented by: Dhivyadharshini (1-2); Dheena (2)
- Country of origin: India
- Original language: Tamil
- No. of seasons: 2
- No. of episodes: 32 (list of episodes)

Production
- Camera setup: Multi-camera
- Running time: approx. 45-50 minutes

Original release
- Network: Vijay TV
- Release: 21 April 2018 – 29 September 2019

Enkitta Modhaade is a 2018-2019 Tamil reality game show that aired on Vijay TV and digitally streams on Disney+ Hotstar. The show features Vijay TV's soap opera families in which the actors will compete in a number of entertainment based challenges. The show has currently entered the second season. The first season aired from 21 April 2018 to 14 July 2018. The first episode of the second season aired on 19 May 2019. The show is hosted by Dhivyadharshini.

== Series overview ==
Season	Episodes	Original Broadcast		Winner
Season	Episodes	First Aired	Last Aired	Winner
1	12	21 April 2018	14 July 2018	
2	20	19 May 2019	29 September 2019	

== Episode list ==
=== Season 1 ===
Episode	Serial Team	Episode Winner	Telecast date
1	Raja Rani; Ponmagal Vanthal		21 April 2018
2	Pagal Nilavu; Chinna Thambi		28 April 2018
3	Mouna Ragam; Villa To Village		5 May 2018
4	Saravanan Meenatchi (season 3); Nenjam Marappathillai	Nenjam Marappathillai	12 May 2018
5	Kalyanamam Kalyanam; Pagal Nilavu	Kalyanamam Kalyanam	19 May 2018
6	Chinna Thambi; Raja Rani	Chinna Thambi	26 May 2018
7	Avalum Naanum; Nenjam Marappathillai	Nenjam Marappathillai	2 June 2018
8	Kalyanamam Kalyanam; Ponmagal Vanthal	Kalyanamam Kalyanam	9 June 2018
9	Chinna Thambi; Kalyanamam Kalyanam	Chinna Thambi	23 June 2018
10	Nenjam Marappathillai; Pagal Nilavu	Nenjam Marappathillai	30 June 2018
11	Chinna Thambi; Nenjam Marappathillai	Semi-Final	7 July 2018
12	Chinna Thambi; Nenjam Marappathillai	Semi-Final	14 July 2018

=== Season 2 ===
Episode	Serial Team	Episode Winner	Telecast date
1	Naam Iruvar Namakku Iruvar; Eeramana Rojave	Naam Iruvar Namakku Iruvar	19 May 2019
2	Raja Rani; Aranmanai Kili	Raja Rani	26 May 2019
3	Bharathi Kannamma; Ponnukku Thanga Manasu	Bharathi Kannamma	2 June 2019
4	Chinna Thambi; Siva Manasula Sakthi	Chinna Thambi	9 June 2019
5	Mouna Raagam; Avalum Naanum		16 June 2019
6	Eeramana Rojave; Aranmanai Kili		23 June 2019
7	Kadaikutty Singam; Pandian Stores		30 June 2019
8	Naam Iruvar Namakku Iruvar; Neelakuyil		7 July 2019
9	Chinna Thambi; Ponnukku Thanga Manasu		14 July 2019
10	Ponmagal Vanthal; Raja Rani		21 July 2019
11			28 July 2019
12	Sundari Neeyum Sundaran Naanum; Pandian Stores		4 August 2019
13	Eeramana Rojave; Siva Manasula Sakthi		11 August 2019
14	Chinna Thambi; Ayutha Ezhuthu		18 August 2019
15	Aranmanai Kili; Siva Manasula Sakthi		25 August 2019
16	Celebrity Round		1 September 2019
17	Naam Iruvar Namakku Iruvar; Pandian Stores		8 September 2019
18	Eeramana Rojave; Bharathi Kannamma		15 September 2019
19	Celebrity Round		22 September 2019
20	Naam Iruvar Namakku Iruvar; Bharathi Kannamma		29 September 2019

== Adaptations ==
Language	Title	Original release	Network(s)	Last Aired	Notes
Tamil	Enkitta Modhaade என்கிட்ட மொதாடே	21 April 2018	Star Vijay	29 September 2019	Original
Hindi	Ravivaar With Star Parivaar रविवार विथ स्टार परिवार	12 June 2022	StarPlus	25 September 2022	Remake
Marathi	Aata Hou De Dhingana आता होऊ दे धिंगाणा	10 September 2022	Star Pravah	Ongoing	Remake
