= AA (band) =

2011–2015 South Korean boy band

Double-A
- Origin: Seoul, South Korea
- Genres: K-pop
- Years active: 2011–2015
- Labels: Wellmade Yedang; Blue Star Entertainment; LOEN
- Spinoffs: AOORA & HOIK
- Past members: Woosang; Hoik; Joowon; Jinhong; Kimchi; Aoora

Double-A (Korean: 더블에이; pronounced "Double-A"), stylized as "AA", was a South Korean boy band formed by Wellmade Yedang, formerly known as Well Made STAR M, in 2011. The group consists of two members: Woosang and Hoik. Since 2015, Blue Star was acquired by Wellmade Yedang, the group while managed by Blue Star.

== Career ==
Aoora was the first to join the group. Looking for a company he could work with and make music, he chose Well Made STAR M. Aoora then brought Woosang to the group, asking him to do the choreography for his music. The company then added Juwon and Hoik, who had aspirations to be singers and moved from Busan to Seoul to do so, and Kimchi, who had quit learning the piano and clarinet for his dream of becoming a singer.

The song "So Crazy" and its music video earned them critical acclaim, with their debut marked as "sexy and charismatic". Despite Aoora being the oldest, Woosang became leader. On 4 November 2011, Double A performed their debut stage live on Music Bank. The group also performed "So Crazy" on various music shows in South Korea such as Music Core, Music on Top and Inkigayo.

On 7 March 2013, AA pre-released a song from their upcoming mini album, Rollin Rollin. The song was banned and deemed unfit for broadcast by KBS and SBS. AA released their first mini album Come Back on 27 March, marking the end of their year and six-month hiatus. The six tracks that were included within the album were all composed, arranged and produced by Aoora.

On 17 June 2013, AA's label revealed, "Joowon has decided to leave the group in order to fulfill his dreams as an actor. He's always had a strong passion for acting. He gave it a lot of thought and talked it over with the members' [sic] to come to the decision. Even after he leaves, he'll be staying at the label Wellmade StarM and support the AA members." AA held an addition of two new members in place of Joowon.

On 30 May 2015, the youngest member Jinhong was revealed to be the newest member added to the boy band 24K. Later on, it was discovered that the member Kimchi left the group in the process of switching companies to Wellmade Star M's subsidiary BLUE STAR Entertainment, leaving Aoora, Hoik and Woosang as the remaining members. Woosang was said that he will join the group promotions when he comes back.

On 20 August 2015, a cover of Omi's "Cheerleader" by Aoora and Hoik was released. On 29 September 2015, the first episode of the third season of F@LLOW ME, starring Aoora and Hoik as AOORA&HOIK, was released, confirming its existence as the sub-unit of the group.

On 1 October 2015, the sub-unit AOORA&HOIK revealed the single and MV for "아침 점심 저녁 (Morning, Afternoon, Evening)".

In May 2016, it was confirmed that Aoora's contract with the agency had expired in March.

== Members ==
- Hwang Ju-won (주원)
- Jinhong (김진홍)
- Kimchi (김치)
- Aoora (아우라)
- Woosang (우상)
- Hoik (호익)

== Discography ==
=== Extended plays ===
Title	Album details	Peak chart positions	Sales
Title	Album details	KOR	Sales
Come Back	Released: 27 March 2013; Label: Sony Music; Formats: CD, digital download	12	KOR: 1,513+

=== Singles ===
Title	Year	Peak chart positions	Sales	Album
Title	Year	KOR	Sales	Album
"Because I'm Crazy" (미쳐서 그래)	2011	—	—N/a	So Crazy single album
"Rollin' Rollin'" (뒹굴뒹굴)	2013	—	—N/a	Come Back
"Midnight Taxi" (새벽택시)	2013	—	KOR: 19,491+	Ok About It single album
"Ok About It" (오케바리)	2013	83	KOR: 22,001+	Ok About It single album
"—" denotes release did not chart.
