= Barrister Babu =

Pre-independence Indian Social Drama

- Genre: Social drama
- Created by: Shashi Mittal; Sumeet Hukamchand Mittal
- Written by: Shashi Mittal; Sumeet Hukamchand Mittal; Vaishali Naik; Seema Mantri
- Directed by: Mangesh Kanthale
- Creative director: Neha Kothari
- Starring: See below
- Theme music composer: Ashish Rego
- Opening theme: Rishta Tera Mera
- Composers: Anish John; Singers; Mukund Suryavanshi; Shreya Phukan
- Country of origin: India
- Original language: Hindi
- No. of seasons: 1
- No. of episodes: 408

Production
- Producers: Shashi Mittal; Sumeet Hukamchand Mittal; Animesh Bandyopadhyay; Gita Pandey Desai Bandyopadhyay
- Cinematography: Abhishek Basu Sudesh Kotian
- Camera setup: Multi-Camera
- Running time: 20-59 minutes
- Production company: Shashi Sumeet Productions

Original release
- Network: Colors TV
- Release: 11 February 2020 – 12 November 2021

Related
- Durga Aur Charu

Barrister Babu is an Indian Hindi-language soap opera by Shashi Sumeet Productions, which broadcast on Colors TV. It aired from 11 February 2020 to 12 November 2021 and starred Pravisht Mishra, Aurra Bhatnagar Badoni and Anchal Sahu.

A sequel, Durga Aur Charu, aired from 12 December 2022 to 14 April 2023. It starred Aurra Bhatnagar Badoni, Vaishnavi prajapati, Rachi Sharma, Adrija Roy, and Kunal Jaisingh.

== Plot ==
In the pre-independence era in rural Bengal, Aniruddh Roy Choudhary, a 22-year-old barrister, returns from London to his family's native village of Tulsipur, intending to marry his childhood sweetheart, Saudamini Bhaumik. Meanwhile, Aniruddh's best friend, Saurabh, is going to marry Sampoorna, a Bengali girl. Sampoorna's parents, Sundaram and Devoleena, and her widowed aunt Sumati, decide to raise money for her dowry by marrying off Sumati's young daughter Bondita to an elderly man.

On Bondita's wedding day, Aniruddh discovers the planned child marriage and unsuccessfully tries to stop it. When the elderly groom dies midway through the wedding, his relatives declare Bondita a widow and demand she perform sati. In a desperate attempt to save her life, Aniruddh marries Bondita, and shocks his family by bringing her home as his wife.

Saudamini, with the assistance of Aniruddh's father Binoy, who wants Aniruddh to return to London and practice law there, plots to separate the newlyweds. On the other hand, Aniruddh's uncle Trilochan accepts Bondita, and becomes fond of her.

After a con man tricks Bondita into helping him, Aniruddh sends her back to her mother, where she is seen as bad luck, abused, and finally sold to a brothel in Kolkata. When Aniruddh finds out, he races to retrieve her, only to be beaten up by the guards and stabbed by the madam. Saurabh rescues him, and the two return in disguise to rescue all of the girls in the brothel.

Meanwhile, Trilochan discovers Saudamini's plot, and she pushes him over, leading to his paralysis from head injuries. When Aniruddh also discovers the plot, Saudamini is expelled from the household. Bondita cures Trilochan's paralysis and is finally accepted by the whole family.

Some time later, Aniruddh, Binoy, and Trilochan visit Sir John Greenwood, the village chief, with various requests. Aniruddh wants permission to send Bondita to school, while Binoy and Trilochan want permission to build a factory and for the village farmers to stop growing indigo. There they encounter Saudamini, now married to Sir Greenwood and calling herself "Betty". Sir Greenwood, at Saudamini's urging, insults them, finally challenging Aniruddh to a competition. If Sir Greenwood loses, he will grant all their requests and resign from his position; if Aniruddh loses, he must become Greenwood's slave for the rest of his life. Aniruddh accepts the challenge and ultimately wins the competition.

Sir Greenwood leaves Tulsipur forever, rejecting Saudamini when she wants to accompany him. In revenge, she kidnaps Bondita and locks her in a chemical plant. When Saurabh dies rescuing her, Saudamini is arrested for murder. Saurabh's father, Premlal, blames Aniruddh for Saurabh's death, and tries to kill him, but Bondita exposes the plot and Premlal is also sent to prison. Devoleena and Sundaram contrive for the widowed Sampoorna to marry Binoy.

Soon after, Aniruddh meets a revolutionary named Manorama, who wants Aniruddh to pretend to marry her as part of a plot. Aniruddh, who is concerned that Bondita has been neglecting her studies to focus on being a good wife, agrees. Manorama fakes her death shortly afterward in a revolutionary operation making realise Bondita about the dreams of becoming lawyer.

Then, in support of the Child Marriage Restraint Act, Aniruddh and Bondita nullify their marriage. When the angered villagers put a price on Bondita's head, Aniruddh sends her to a hostel in Siliguri for her safety. Sampoorna and Devoleena help a villager find and kidnap her, but Aniruddh is able to rescue her in time.

Bondita's great-aunt, Kalindi Das, arrives and takes Bondita to her village of Krishna Nagar. As a young woman, Kalindi had been engaged to Trilochan, but after she violated custom to care for him when he was sick, Trilochan refused to marry her. Kalindi, who has remained single for the rest of her life, carries a grudge against the Roy Choudharys, and attempts to take it out on Bondita and Aniruddh.

Kalindi arranges for Bondita to marry Chandrachur Banerjee, who is infatuated with her. A disguised Aniruddh rescues Bondita and sends her to London to fulfill her dream of becoming a barrister. Kalindi substitutes Bondita's cousin, Tupur, as the bride, and Chandrachur reluctantly accepts under pressure from his parents.

=== 8 years later ===
Bondita, now grown up, returns to Tulsipur as a barrister. Aniruddh refuses to see her because of her relation to Kalindi, whom the Roy Choudharys have sworn enmity against. Dismayed, Bondita travels to Krishna Nagar, where Tupur tells her that Kalindi had agreed to make peace with the Roy Choudharys until Aniruddh concealed a bomb among gifts to her.

Bondita refuses to believe this and returns to Tulsipur in disguise to find out the truth. There she encounters Binoy, now mentally disabled after the feuding people of Krishna Nagar poisoned and attacked them. When Bondita is blamed for an attack on the Roy Choudharys orchestrated by Chandrachur, Aniruddh fails to support her, and Bondita cuts him off. Aniruddh realizes he has fallen in love with Bondita and confesses his feelings to her; she forgives him, they convince their families to end the feud, and the couple remarry.

On the wedding night, Chandrachur, still obsessed with Bondita, plans to sexually assault her. When Bondita's cousin Tapur discovers his attentions, he assaults her instead. Aniruddh catches him and accidentally pushes him off a cliff; to preserve Tapur's dignity, he keeps the assault a secret, even when arrested for murdering Chandrachur.

Bondita, resolved to defend Aniruddh in court, investigates and discovers the truth of what happened. At her urging, Tapur agrees to testify in court, but is scared off by public prosecutor Subodh Chatterjee. Bondita discovers Chandrachur, still alive; at first he escapes before she can take him to court, but she tricks him into confessing to all his crimes, including poisoning Binoy and the bombing blamed on Aniruddh. Chandrachur is arrested, Bondita wins the case, Aniruddh is found innocent, and Aniruddh and Bondita finally consummate their marriage.

In Bondita's next case, she defends a pregnant widow against her in-laws. Her opponent is Aniruddh's youngest brother, Batuk, now an advocate. He was sent to Italy to avoid the feud between Tulsipur and Krishna Nagar, and blames Bondita for the separation from his family. When Bondita gives a speech encouraging widow remarriage, attendees revolt, and the widow's in-laws take the opportunity to drag her off. Bondita chases after them, but they throw her into a river; Aniruddh rescues her, but is lost himself, despite Batuk's attempts to save him.

Batuk, now angrier than ever, wants to kill Bondita; when he finds out she is pregnant, he decides to instead wait until the baby is born to seize it and throw her out of the house. With the help of an unwitting Trilochan, he disguises himself as Aniruddh, to Bondita's gradually increasing suspicion. Meanwhile, the real Aniruddh is being cared for by a stranger who found him paralyzed and unable to remember his address.

Six months later, Bondita, having won the pregnant widow's case, realises that the person living with her is actually Batuk. Before she can set out in search of the real Aniruddh, she goes into labor, and gives birth to twin girls. Batuk kidnaps the twins and takes them home to prepare to abscond to Italy with them, locking the door to keep out a desperate Bondita. Outside the door, Bondita begs him to return her babies, until Batuk drops a lighted match on her, intending to burn her alive.

Arriving in the nick of time, a recovered Aniruddh appears, saves Bondita, and breaks down the door. After Aniruddh throws out Batuk, Bondita and Aniruddh take their newborn twins before a statue of Durga, vowing that their children will also become barristers and fight to overcome social evils.

== Cast ==
=== Main ===
- Pravisht Mishra as
  - Barrister Aniruddh Roy Choudhary: Shubhra and Binoy's eldest son; Somnath and Batuk's brother; Shashwati's half-brother; Bondita's husband; Durga and Devi's father (2020–2021)
  - Advocate Batuk Roy Choudhary: Shubhra and Binoy's youngest son; Aniruddh and Somnath's brother; Shashwati's half-brother; Malika's ex-boyfriend (2021)
    - Meet Rohra / Vaidik Poriya / Daksh Rana as Child Batuk Roy Choudhary (2020–2021)
- Anchal Sahu as Barrister Bondita Aniruddh Roy Choudhary (née Das): Sumati and Arvind's daughter; Sampoorna, Tupur and Tapur's cousin; Aniruddh's wife; Durga and Devi's mother (2021)
    - Aurra Bhatnagar Badoni as Child Bondita Das (2020–2021)

=== Recurring ===
- Pranali Rathod as Saudamini "Mini/Betty" Greenwood (née Bhaumik): Shivanand's daughter; Aniruddh's ex-fiancée; John's wife (2020)
- Rishi Khurana as Trilochan Roy Choudhary: Patriarch of Roy Chowdhury family; Binoy's brother; Aniruddh, Somnath, Batuk and Shashwati's uncle; Kalindi's ex-fiancée (2020–2021)
- Chandan K Anand as Binoy Roy Choudhary: Trilochan's brother; Shubhra's widower; Sampoorna's second husband; Aniruddh, Somnath, Batuk and Shashwati's father; Durga and Devi's grandfather (2020–2021)
- Ansh Gupta as Dr. Somnath Roy Choudhary: Shubhra and Binoy's second son; Aniruddh and Batuk's brother; Shashwati's half-brother (2021)
  - Viraj Kapoor / Param Mehta as Teenage Somnath Roy Choudhary (2020–2021)
- Pallavi Mukherjee as Sampoorna Jadhav Roy Choudhary: Devoleena and Sundaram's daughter; Bondita's cousin; Saurabh's widow; Binoy's second wife; Shashwati's mother (2020–2021)
- Arina Dey as Sumati Jadhav Das: Sundaram's sister; Arvind's widow; Bondita's mother; Durga and Devi's grandmother (2020–2021)
- Kundan Kumar as Bihari Babu: Malti's husband; househelp at Roy Chowdhury household (2020–2021)
- Sadiya Siddiqui as Kalindi Das (Thaku Maa): Trilochan's ex-fiancée; Arvind and Shaumik's aunt; Bondita, Tupur and Tapur's grandaunt (2021)
- Bhavya Sachdeva as Chandrachur Banerjee: Bondita's obsessive lover; Tupur's husband; Aniruddh's rival (2021)
- Jason Shah as Sir John Greenwood: Saudamini's husband (2020)
- Rohan Roy as Sundaram Jadhav: Sumati's brother; Devoleena's husband; Sampoorna's father; Shashwati's grandfather (2020–2021)
- Barsha Chatterjee as Devoleena Jadhav: Sundaram's wife; Sampoornaa's mother; Shashwati's grandmother (2020–2021)
- Dev Aaditya as Saurabh Munshi: Biraj and Premlal's son; Surmani's step-son; Sampoorna's first husband; Aniruddh's best friend (2020)
- Diksha Tiwari as Tupur Das Banerjee: Rimjhim and Shaumik's elder daughter; Tapur's sister; Bondita's cousin; Chandrachur's wife (2021)
  - Geet Jain as Child Tupur Das Banerjee (2021)
- Ketaki Kulkarni / Saumya Shetye as Tapur Somnath Roy Choudhry: Rimjhim and Shaumik's younger daughter; Tupur's sister; Bondita's cousin (2021)
  - Nabiya Ansari as Child Tapur Das (2021)
- Krisha Pandirkar as Shashwati Roy Choudhary: Sampoorna and Binoy's daughter; Aniruddh, Somnath and Batuk's half-sister; Durga and Devi's cousin/step-aunt (2021)
- Khushboo Kamal as Rimjhim Das: Shaumik's wife; Tupur and Tapur's mother (2021)
- Luv K Kwatra as Shaumik Das: Arvind's brother; Rimjhim's husband; Tupur and Tapur's father (2021)
- Ashish Kaul as Shivanand Bhaumik: Basuri's son; Binoy's friend; Saudamini's father (2020)
- Akshita Arora as Basuri Devi Bhaumik: Shivanand's mother; Saudamini's grandmother (2020)
- Premchand Singh as Premlal Munshi: Surmani and Biraj's husband; Saurabh's father (2020)
- Madhushee Sharma as Surmani Munshi: Premlal's first wife; Saurabh's step-mother (2020)
- Hetal Yadav as Biraj Munshi: Premlal's second wife; Saurabh's mother (2020)
- Adish Vaidya as Brijwasi Babu: A fraud who pretends to be a huge devotee of Lord Krishna (2020)
- Kalyani Jha as Malti: Bihari's wife; househelp at Roy Chowdhury's house (2021)
- Naman Arora as Praveen: Chandrachur's friend (2021)
- Sayantani Ghosh as Rasiya Bai: Dancer at brothel (2020) (Dead)
- Alka Kaushal as Tara Bai: Brothel owner (2020)
- Ram Awana as Muchhad Babu: The man who sells Bondita to Tara Bai (2020)
- Prakriti Nautiyal as Ramaiya: Suraiya's twin-sister; dancer at brothel (2020)
- Pragya Nautiyal as Suraiya: Ramaiya's twin-sister; dancer at brothel (2020)
- Disha Tewani as Shubhra Roy Choudhary: Binoy's first wife; Aniruddh, Somnath and Batuk's mother; Durga and Devi's grandmother (2020)
- Chahat Tewani as Fake Shubhra Roy Choudhary: An orphan; Premlal's aide (2020)
- Rachana Mistry as Manorama: A revolutionary; Aniruddh's fake wife (2021)
- Simmi Ghoshal as Laboni Banerjee: Chandrachur's cousin (2021)
- Chetan Pandit as Public Prosecutor Subodh Chatterjee (2021)
- Sejal Banodha as Mallika: Batuk's ex-girlfriend (2021)

== Production ==
=== Broadcast ===
The production and airing of the show were halted indefinitely since 19 March 2020, due to the COVID-19 pandemic in India. The filming was expected to resume on 1 April 2020 but could not and the series was last broadcast on 31 March 2020 when the remaining episodes were aired. The episodes resumed on 6 July 2020. On 22 June 2021, Colors TV unveiled a teaser to introduce the new actress, Anchal Sahu as grown-up Bondita, and the eight-year leap after Anirudh and Bondita's separation.

The show had integrated episodes with Namak Issk Ka in 2021.

Barrister Babu was dubbed in Tamil as Bommi B.A, B.L premiered on 3 May 2021. It has also been dubbed in Bengali and aired from September 2020. The show went off-air on 12 November 2021 with Balika Vadhu 2 replacing it from 15 November 2021.

=== Soundtrack ===
The original soundtrack was composed by Shreya Phukan and Mukund Suryavansh, namely, Rishta Tera Mera (The Relation between You and Me). The themes of respective characters were composed by Ashish Rego.

Original Songs
No.	Title	Length
1.	"Handiya se Rasgulle Khaye"
2.	"Aaja Tujhko Mitti Puckare"
3.	"Lad liya tere liye sabse"
4.	"Rasmon ka shor bada hai"
5.	"Door hai par tera saya hai - 1"
6.	"Rasmon ka mela yahan hai"
7.	"Pyar choot raha hai mera"
8.	"Door har par tera saya hai - 2"
9.	"Tughe me Roshan hoga suraj"
10.	"Kyun bharosa mera toda"
11.	"Jhoot bolun jeeb sulge"
12.	"Jhoot tera uljha dhaga"
13.	"Kuch khafa hu kuch dukhi hoon"
14.	"Tark se hai fark padta"
15.	"Mene kaha tha saath rahunga"
16.	"Dhoop jeevan tujhko dhoonde"
17.	"Main ladhoonga tere khatir"
18.	"Rooh meri kaanpti hai"
19.	"dur tak hai ek udasi"
20.	"Main vo murat hoon"
21.	"Mera dil tu pyar mera hai tu"
22.	"Aaja Tujhko Mitti Puckare (slow version)"

=== Casting ===
In January 2020, Rishi Khurana joined the cast. In June 2020, it was rumoured that Devoleena Bhattacharjee is set to replace Aurra Bhatnagar as grown up Bondita, which was denied by the production house. Twins Prakriti and Pragya Nautiyal played two brothel workers, Ramaiya and Suraiya. In December 2020, child actor Chahat Tewani entered the show as a pretend reincarnation of Anirudh's mother, Shubhra. In May 2021, Sadiya Siddiqui to entered the show as Bondita's Thakuma. In May 2021, Khushboo Kamal joined the show as Rimjhim but quit the show in June 2021 post leap stating that she wasn't comfortable playing the mother of a twenty year old. Her character was shown to have died in the show. In June 2021, Kanika Mann was almost finalised to play elder Bondita but she backed out of the show. In June 2021, Bhavya Sachdeva to entered the show as Chandrachur. In June 2021, Anchal Sahu was confirmed to be playing elder Bondita post leap. In September 2021, Guneet Sharma played Angad.
