= Aami Dakini =

Indian supernatural television series

- Genre: Supernatural; Thriller; Fantasy drama
- Created by: Shrikant Mohta
- Based on: Aahat
- Developed by: B. P. Singh
- Written by: Aditi Powar
- Directed by: Anupam Hari; Saket Yadav
- Starring: Sheen Dass; Hitesh Bharadwaj; Rachi Sharma; Sudha Chandran
- Country of origin: India
- Original language: Hindi
- No. of seasons: 1
- No. of episodes: 65

Production
- Executive producer: Sumeet Dubey
- Producers: Shrikant Mohta; Mahendra Soni
- Cinematography: Yogendra Tripathi
- Editor: Shashank H Singh
- Camera setup: Multi-camera
- Running time: 20 minutes
- Production company: Shree Venkatesh Films

Original release
- Network: Sony Entertainment Television; SonyLIV
- Release: 23 June – 19 September 2025

Aami Dakini is an Indian Hindi-language television supernatural romantic horror drama series and is the second part of Aahat chronology, that aired from 23 June 2025 to 19 September 2025 on Sony Entertainment Television and streams digitally on SonyLIV. Produced by Shree Venkatesh Films, the show stars Hitesh Bharadwaj and Rachi Sharma.

== Plot ==
Aami Dakini follows Ayaan, a rationalist who returns to his ancestral Kolkata bungalow with his family. Unbeknownst to them, the house is haunted by Dakini, a vengeful spirit from an ancient tragedy who believes Ayaan is the reincarnation of her lost lover. As the haunting intensifies, a local spiritual guide named Meera works to protect the family and help the spirit find closure.

== Cast ==
=== Main ===
- Hitesh Bharadwaj as Ayaan Roy Choudhury
- Rachi Sharma as Meera Ghosh
- Sheen Dass as Madhumati the "Dakini"

=== Recurring ===
- Karanvir Bohra as Professor D.D. Kalkarni
- Sudha Chandran as Rajni: Anjali's elder sister; Guddi's mother; Sonia's aunt
- Unknown as Guddi: Rajni's daughter; Sonia's maternal cousin sister
- Tisha Kapoor as Sonia: Mahesh and Anjali's daughter; Guddi's maternal cousin sister; Jagrut's ex-fiancee
- Unknown as Anjali: Rajni's younger sister; Mahesh's wife; Sonia's mother; Guddi's aunt
- Unknown as Mahesh: Anjali's husband; Sonia's father
- Preeti Amin as Mrs. Ghosh
- Dinesh Lwange as Ravi
- Keshvee Sisodiya as Sagarika
- Daksh Sharma as Pablo
- Ranveer Singh Malik as Jagrut: Guddi's murderer; Sonia's fiance (Dead)
- Rajeshwari Datta as Piyali
- Kanchan Kumar Ghosh
- Shraddha Tripathi
- Swaroopa Ghosh
- Amit Kaushik
- Amit Singh
- Aman Agarwal
- Kesar
- Jyoti Mukherjee
- Aman Chaoudry

== Production ==
=== Casting ===
Sheen Dass confirmed to play Ghost, Dakini. Rohit Chandel was approached to play male lead, Ayaan but Hitesh Bharadwaj replace it. Rachi Sharma confirmed to play Meera Ghosh. In July 2025, Karanvir Bohra was cast as Professor D.D. Kalkarni.
