= Preeti Amin =

Indian television actress (born 1967)

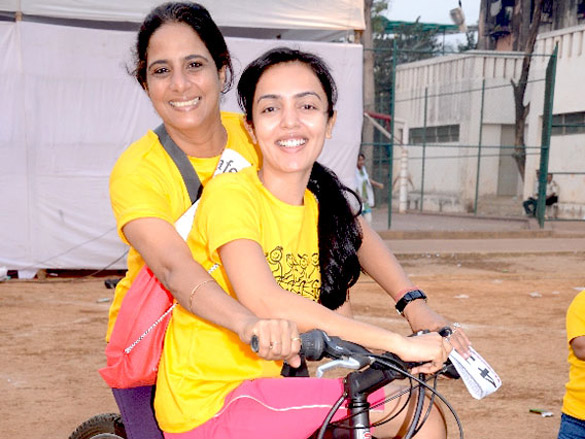
- Amin in 2011
- Born: 29 December 1967 (age 58); Hyderabad, Andhra Pradesh (now in Telangana), India
- Occupation: Actress
- Years active: 2003–present
- Known for: Chakravakam; Jhoome Jiiya Re; Dill Mill Gayye; Lapataganj; Durga Aur Charu; Katha Ankahee; Yeh Rishta Kya Kehlata Hai
- Height: 5 ft 4 in (1.63 m)
- Spouse: Lionel Pereira (m. 2014)
- Parent: Neeta Amin (mother)
- Relatives: Kaushal Amin (brother)

Preeti Amin (born 29 December 1967) is an Indian actress who mainly works in Telugu and Hindi television. She is best known for her roles of Sravanthi in Chakravakam, Jiya Sabharwal in Jhoome Jiiya Re, Dr. Jiya Abhimanyu Modi in Dill Mill Gayye, Surili in Lapataganj, Bholi in Durga Aur Charu, Neerja in Katha Ankahee and Akshara Goenka Sharma in Yeh Rishta Kya Kehlata Hai.

== Career ==
Amin started her acting career with Telugu shows, Chakravakam, Aloukika and Nanna. She then participated in India's Best Cinestars Ki Khoj in 2004.

Amin made her debut in Hindi television with Kasamh Se in 2006 where she played Lakshmi Makhija. She played the lead role of Jiya Sabharwal in Jhoome Jiiya Re from 2007 to 2008. She went onto appear in shows like Kasamh Se, Dill Mill Gayye, Bhaskar Bharti, CID and Aahat's crossover episode, Mrs. Kaushik Ki Paanch Bahuein and Dil Ki Nazar Se Khoobsurat.

Amin is widely known for playing Surili in Lapataganj from 2009 to 2012. She then participated in Comedy Circus Ke Taansen. Amin also judged Zee TV Rajasthan's show Nach Le Bindani, the Rajasthani version of Dance India Dance Super Moms.

After a hiatus of eight years, Amin made her comeback with Durga Aur Charu and then appeared in Katha Ankahee. From November 2023 to December 2023 she played Advocate Akshara Sharma in Yeh Rishta Kya Kehlata Hai.

== Personal life ==
Amin met Lionel Pereira, an American psychiatrist in 2009 and they began dating in 2011. On 26 October 2014, Amin married Pereira in a church wedding ceremony.

== Filmography ==
=== Television ===
Year	Title	Role	Notes	Ref.
2003–2006	Chakravakam	Sravanthi Indra	Telugu show	Lead Role
2004	India's Best Cinestars Ki Khoj	Contestant		
2004–2005	Nanna	Kavita Sambasivarao	Telugu shows	
2004–2006	Aloukika	Trishna	Telugu shows	
2006	Kasamh Se	Lakshmi Makhija		
2007–2008	Jhoome Jiiya Re	Jiya "Dabboo" Sabharwal	Lead Role	
2009	Bhaskar Bharti	Geeta	Special appearance	
2009	Dill Mill Gayye	Dr. Jiya Abhimanyu Modi	Negative Role	
2009–2012	Lapataganj	Surili Pandey		
2010	CID	Manasi	Crossover episode	
2010	Aahat	Manasi	Crossover episode	
2011	Comedy Circus Ke Tansen	Contestant		
2012–2013	Mrs. Kaushik Ki Paanch Bahuein	Komila Bhalla Kaushik		
2013	Dil Ki Nazar Se Khoobsurat	Anisha		
2014	Nach Le Bindani	Judge	Rajasthani show	
2022–2023	Durga Aur Charu	Bholi	Negative Role	
2022–2023	Katha Ankahee	Neerja "Dodo"		
2023	Yeh Rishta Kya Kehlata Hai	Advocate Akshara "Akshu" Goenka Sharma		
2024	Lakshmi Narayan – Sukh Samarthya Santulan	Kavyamata		
2024–2025	Kaise Mujhe Tum Mil Gaye	Vandana "Vandy" Karvekar		
2025	Aami Dakini	Mrs. Ghosh		
2025	Shiv Shakti – Tap Tyaag Tandav	Mahalasa's Mother		

=== Web series ===
Year	Title	Role	Notes	Ref.
2024	Raisinghani VS Raisinghani	Radha Raisinghani	Special appearance	

=== Music video ===
Year	Title	Singer	Album	Ref.
2006	"Teri Deewani"	Kailasa	Kailash Kher	
