= Aloukika =

- Genre: Alien, Supernatural, Mystery, Thriller
- Created by: Ilyas Ahmed
- Written by: Ilyas Ahmed
- Directed by: Ilyas Ahmed
- Starring: Preeti Amin
- Theme music composer: Vasurao Saluri
- Original language: Telugu

Production
- Producer: ETV Telugu

Aloukika is an alien, supernatural drama, mystery-thriller television serial directed by Ilyas Ahmed. The serial, which was made in Telugu language, premiered on ETV Telugu in (2004-2006). This unique serial was based on other dimensions, aliens and time travel. It was produced by Ramoji Rao, the head of the Ramoji Group and the then head of ETV. Aloukika means the other world.

== Plot ==
Called by powerful forces, a young woman named Trishna (Preeti Amin) leaves her loving family and begins a search for the unknown. She finds a settlement and its inhabitants caught in a time warp. She returns to the zone repeatedly in her journey of self discovery and existentialism.

=== Soundtrack ===
The title song was composed by Vasurao Saluri and the lyrics penned by Suman.

=== Critical reception ===
It has received accolades from the critics and awards of appreciation from cultural organizations.
