= Dev DD =

- Genre: Drama; Romance
- Written by: Nikhil Vyas; Kamayani Vyas; Sumrit Shahi
- Directed by: Ken Ghosh; Samar Iqbal; Harsh Dedhia
- Starring: Aasheema Vardhan; Akhil Kapur; Sanjay Suri; Suneel Sinha
- Composer: Ripul Sharma
- Country of origin: India
- Original language: Hindi
- No. of seasons: 2
- No. of episodes: 28 (list of episodes)

Production
- Producers: Ekta Kapoor; Shobha Kapoor
- Cinematography: Anubhav Bansal; Shreya Gupta; Lawrence Dcunha
- Camera setup: Multi-Camera
- Running time: 16-26 minutes
- Production company: Balaji Telefilms

Original release
- Network: ALTBalaji; ZEE5 (season 2)
- Release: 21 April 2017 – 20 February 2021

Dev DD is a 2017 Hindi web series, conceptualised and produced by Shobha Kapoor and Ekta Kapoor for Balaji Telefilms. It is directed by Ken Ghosh, for video on demand platform ALTBalaji. The web series released on 21 April 2017. It stars Asheema Vardaan, Sanjay Suri, Akhil Kapur, Rumana Molla, Rashmi Agdekar, and Sandeep Pandey in lead roles. This web series is a reinterpretation of the 1917 Bengali novel Devdas written by Sarat Chandra Chattopadhyay. Dev DD is about a young modern woman who is trying her best to break the concept about how Indian women are supposed to be. All the eleven episodes of this series are available on the ALTBalaji and its associated websites.

Season 2 was directed by Samar Iqbal and Harsh Dedhia. It was released on 20 February 2021 at ALTBalaji and ZEE5 digitally. It stars Sanjay Suri, Asheema Vardaan, Aman Uppal, Rashmi Agdekar, Nauheed Cyrusi, Rumana Molla, Suneel Sihna, and Deepika Amin as lead roles. Season 2 contains 17 episodes, and it is about homophobia, sexism, and feminism.

== Plot ==
Season 1

It is a modern Devdas in which sexism, homophobia, feminism and many more things that are refused in social societies to stress upon. The story revolves around Devika "Vicky" Dwivedi (Asheema Vardaan), the type of girl society usually grimaces upon. She drinks, smokes, accepts how much she loves sex and a feminist from her heart. A kind of girl gets a usual label as a slut or characterless from men and some regressive women. However, she is her father's pride, and he loves his daughter the way she is. Vicky meets Paro aka Parth (Akhil Kapur), whom she falls in love with and gets heartbroken. Vicky then falls in love with Anurag, who is more matured.

Season 2

Devika's journey of discovering herself. Anurag vanishes on her in Mumbai, and a heartbroken Devika falls into depression. She is no longer craving for alcohol or drugs, and is looking for acceptance and love, but Anurag abandons her just when she needs him. Unknown to her, Chandni too is mad at her best friend for falling in love with her father. A shattered Devika wakes up in Jaipur, but doesn't know when and how she got back to her city. Her parents are distraught. There are rumours flying in the city, some believe she became a call girl, others say she was pregnant in Mumbai and others were sure that Devika is a recovering drug addict. Devika listens to them all, is regularly slut-shamed and believes that she was in the wrong. Until one day, she speaks with her father and realizes that she comes from a long line of badass women. She wasn't born to be heartbroken and sad; she was born to breathe fire. Devika picks herself up and goes back to being the woman she always was. She has a strong voice and a strident tone against societal taboos as well as for her opinions. Thus, she fights for Chandni and supports her LGBT marriage with Radha against all odds. Her emotions find new ways with her friend, Paro too. At one point, her courageous outlook to move on and start finding new meaning in life can be seen. At another point, she fiercely picks up her shattered self and charges up to face the challenges again. After Anurag's death, she comes across as more strong-willed. Then, it becomes impossible for her to fall back. She joins hands with Aditi to solve the gender determination scam and exposes the real culprit behind Anurag's demise. As the season progresses, we see Devika rediscover herself. She will learn that her worth isn't attached to a man, that she is who she is not because of the men in her life, but because of the potential she holds.

== Cast and characters ==
Actor	Role(s)	Based on	Appearances	
Actor	Role(s)	Based on	Season 1	Season 2
Asheema Vardaan	Devika "Vicky" Dwivedi	Devdas	Main	Main
Sanjay Suri	Anurag	Chandramukhi	Main	Main
Akhil Kapur	Parth	Paro	Main	
Aman Uppal	Paritosh Gupta			Main
Rashmi Agdekar	Chandni	Chunni Lal	Recurring	Recurring
Rumana Molla	Radha		Recurring	Recurring
Sandeep Pandey	Shrikant		Recurring	Recurring
Jason Shah	Philip		Recurring	Recurring
Nauheed Cyrusi	Aditi Kapadia			Recurring
Deepika Amin	Kanta Dwivedi	Harimati Mukherjee (Devdas's mom)	Recurring	Recurring
Satyajit Sharma	Awasthi			Recurring
Sunil Sinha	Dharma Dwivedi	Narayan Mukherjee (Devdas's dad)		Recurring
Gireesh Sahdev	Mamaji		Recurring	
Pallavi Jaiswal	Meghna			Recurring
Haseen Hasan Nizami	Aruna			Recurring
Nabeel Ahmed	Samit			Recurring

== Episodes ==
Series	Episodes	Originally released		
Series	Episodes	First released	Last released	Network
1	11	21 April 2017	21 April 2017	ALTBalaji
2	17	20 February 2021	20 February 2021	ALTBalaji and ZEE5

=== Season 1 ===
No. overall	No. in season	Title	Directed by	Written by	Original release date
1	1	"Dev DD vs. Sri Kunt"	Ken Ghosh	Nikhil Vyas, Kamayani Vyas	21 April 2017
A notorious girl, a sleazy man, and a point to be proven. Can reputation kill honest intentions?
2	2	"Yeh! Shaadi Cancel"	Ken Ghosh	Nikhil Vyas, Kamayani Vyas	21 April 2017
Devika takes charge of the situation. With a cousin's wedding at stake, the question is, to do or not to do?
3	3	"Horny OK Please"	Ken Ghosh	Nikhil Vyas, Kamayani Vyas	21 April 2017
Devika gets intimate with a friend. Is this a fling or the beginning of a love story?
4	4	"Love Of Every Kind"	Ken Ghosh	Nikhil Vyas, Kamayani Vyas	21 April 2017
A friend with benefits and emotions overflowing. Love seems to be making its way amidst anger and chaos.
5	5	"Serious Delirious"	Ken Ghosh	Nikhil Vyas, Kamayani Vyas	21 April 2017
With rules laid down and increasing family pressure, is marriage a trap to cage a free bird?
6	6	"Heartbreak And Run"	Ken Ghosh	Nikhil Vyas, Kamayani Vyas	21 April 2017
High and dazed, Devika vents out her anger in public. Can her family accept this side of her personality?
7	7	"Vexed In The City"	Ken Ghosh	Nikhil Vyas, Kamayani Vyas	21 April 2017
In an attempt to run away from herself, Devika runs away from home. Is this the beginning of a new chapter?
8	8	"Rock Bottom"	Ken Ghosh	Nikhil Vyas, Kamayani Vyas	21 April 2017
Devika gives herself a second chance. A new man, a new job. Will life finally settle down for Devika?
9	9	"Closure Exposure"	Ken Ghosh	Nikhil Vyas, Kamayani Vyas	21 April 2017
Devika's past has resurfaced. It's head vs. heart for her. Will she be able to look forward in life?
10	10	"Who's Your Daddy"	Ken Ghosh	Nikhil Vyas, Kamayani Vyas	21 April 2017
Devika's family refuses to accept her lifestyle. Will Devika give up her identity to reunite with her family?
11	11	"The Girlfriend"	Ken Ghosh	Nikhil Vyas, Kamayani Vyas	21 April 2017
Devika moves on with her newfound love. Is this the 'happily ever after' moment for Anurag and Devika?

=== Season 2 ===
No. overall	No. in season	Title	Directed by	Written by	Original release date
12	1	"Detox Devika"	Samar Iqbal, Harsh Dedhia	Nikhil Vyas, Kamayani Vyas, Sumrit Shahi	20 February 2021
Devika wakes up from a dream, realises she is in Jaipur, not in Mumbai. She is depressed and crying, remembering her time with Anurag. Her family is shocked to see her in this new sad avatar. Devika is still wondering about what happened to her and Chandni’s friendship, and why Chandni is not in touch with her. Devika’s parents are deeply concerned about her and decide to make things normal for her again. Her father offers her cigarettes and alcohol, but she refuses and throws them away. Devika’s mother plans to take her out for movies, shopping and even to a neighbourhood Mundan Party. At that Mundan party, aunties taunt Devika about her return from Mumbai and her pregnancy rumours. Devika gets frustrated and leaves to be by herself in a lonely place where she meets Paritosh who is her childhood friend. Unlike Devika, Anurag is handling the break-up with a lot more maturity. He is sad to remember what he told Chandni about him and Devika. But he is not depressed. He is trying to move on by ways of partying with Aditi and friends. He starts spending time with Aditi who is his ex-girlfriend too. At the end of this episode, we come to know that Aditi is pregnant.
13	2	"Ex-ccident"	Samar Iqbal, Harsh Dedhia	Nikhil Vyas, Kamayani Vyas, Sumrit Shahi	20 February 2021
Anurag and Aditi come all the way to Jaipur for her off the record abortion. Jan Janta hospital’s peon tries to help them out in that matter. He asks them to meet someone at the Underground Club for their work at night. Meanwhile, Paritosh takes Devika out at night with her mother’s permission, as she feels that Devika might open up with Paritosh regarding the reason for her utter silence. They also land up at the Underground Club. Anurag indulges in a small fight with some local boys at the club. The UG club’s bouncer pushes Anurag away from the fight and gives him a visiting card. Also asks him to meet the right person for his work. At the end of the episode, Devika is in shock as she seems to have seen Anurag at the UG club.
14	3	"Behen, Yeh Tera Baap Hai?"	Samar Iqbal, Harsh Dedhia	Nikhil Vyas, Kamayani Vyas, Sumrit Shahi	20 February 2021
Devika seems to have seen Anurag at the UG club. Anurag and Aditi go to the Jan Janta Hospital to meet Dr Singh whose visiting card was given by the UG club’s bouncer for their work. They try to enquire about the off the record gender determination test of the child. Dr Singh gets angry and calls the security and the police for them as it is illegal and a crime. They run from the hospital to their hotel secretly where we find out their real motive of visiting Jaipur. They want to expose the on-going foeticide and gender determination scam happening in the Jan Janta Hospital which is the reason for Aditi’s sister Ritu’s death. On the other side, Chandni’s mom tells Devika’s family that her house has been usurped. She accuses Devika of influencing Chandni. Devika’s father calls Chandni and asks her to come to their home. Chandni comes but takes her mother away to the hotel. She is still very upset with Devika. Later Chandni's Mom calls Devika's Mom to tell her that, Chandni has gone to meet her Mamaji who has usurped their house. Devika agrees to go and help Chandni despite their misunderstanding when her mother insists. Devika is shocked to see Anurag at Chandni's house and realizes that he is Chandni's Dad.
15	4	"Sab Khatam aur Main Shuru"	Samar Iqbal, Harsh Dedhia	Nikhil Vyas, Kamayani Vyas, Sumrit Shahi	20 February 2021
Chandni gets angry with Devika and Anurag when she sees them at her house together and accuses them of acting. Devika tells Anurag that Chandni will understand their relationship but Anurag walks off, which makes her more depressed. She is walking on the top of the Fort thinking about Anurag, stood on the edge. Paritosh and Devika’s father reaches the top of the fort to save Devika and has an emotional conversation with her which makes her realise her true worth. She transforms into her original self. She is the same old Devika now with all her badass attitude and pranking everyone. She starts by inviting the same aunties over for a party which surprises her mother as well.
16	5	"Kuch Toh Log Karengey"	Samar Iqbal, Harsh Dedhia	Nikhil Vyas, Kamayani Vyas, Sumrit Shahi	20 February 2021
Devika throws a party for all the aunties and reveals all their dirty secrets and embarrasses them just the way they tried bullying her in the Mundan Party. When Devika’s father comes home he is shocked to see that Devika’s mother is surprisingly supportive of her actions. Devika gets a call from Radha asking her to see her outside her house. Radha stays in Devika’s house as her parents insist. The next day she takes her to meet Chandni who is still annoyed with Devika. She tries to warm up with Chandni and they all plan to get the house back with Paritosh. Meanwhile, Anurag and Aditi are trying to deduce the mystery that took place with them at the Jan Janta hospital. After getting the quick Pizza service in the hotel room, they both wonder how the police have also come to the hospital in no time and it seems like it was all premeditated. They both are now determined to know the truth and want to go back to Jan Janta Hospital again for more information.
17	6	"Pride Parade"	Samar Iqbal, Harsh Dedhia	Nikhil Vyas, Kamayani Vyas, Sumrit Shahi	20 February 2021
Devika is waiting for the call at the breakfast table as Chandni’s mom curses Devika for influencing Chandni. LGBTQIA community comes to Chandni's house and forces Mamaji to vacate the house. Finally, Chandni and mom move back into their house and they hold an LGBTQIA party there. But her mother tells her she will never accept her relationship with Radha. Anurag and Aditi go to the hospital again secretly avoiding the confrontations with the peon and the same nurse. They enter Dr Singh’s cabin. And to their shock, it is empty.
18	7	"Hook Up Yaa Screw Up"	Samar Iqbal, Harsh Dedhia	Nikhil Vyas, Kamayani Vyas, Sumrit Shahi	20 February 2021
Anurag and Aditi enter the room and get shocked to see it completely empty, devoid of any furniture, files, or records. There are two-three workers, wearing masks and gloves and doing termite extermination over there. When they are about to leave the hospital, they have been caught by Awasthi, the trustee of the hospital, and his man Friday. Aditi asks him about the gender determination and illegal abortion scam going in the hospital which he denies and asks them to show him the concrete proof. Devika, Chandni and Radha are at the cafe discussing Devika’s love life. They suggest that she should date more. This is where the foreigner comes in and introduces himself to Devika. Devika’s mother has called a Pandit with proposed grooms’ pictures. Devika’s father advises her to do something worthwhile in life. She goes for the interview where Mrs Marwah interferes and does not let her get the job. She meets the foreigner again outside the place and they go and make out. Anurag and Aditi go to Dr Singh’s house to meet him but shocked to see the locked house. Aditi comes up with Plan B and they both look at each other determined.
19	8	"Ex Aur Next"	Samar Iqbal, Harsh Dedhia	Nikhil Vyas, Kamayani Vyas, Sumrit Shahi	20 February 2021
Devika, Radha and Chandni are talking about Devika’s plight with the foreigner as he cries for being a virgin. They arrive at the decision that Paritosh is a guy worth trying but Devika is not convinced. So, Radha and Chandni plan to go to the hospital to meet Paritosh along with Devika as Radha pretends to have an itching eye. Aditi and Anurag as well come again to the hospital to find some clues. Man Friday informs Awasthi about Anurag and Aditi as they are in hospital again. But Awasthi ignores them. Devika sees Anurag when she is coming from Paritosh’s cabin. She smiles at Paritosh and hugs him naughtily looking at Anurag, deliberately trying to make him jealous. But in between Anurag gets a call from Aditi as she finds some more clues, so he must leave. Devika sees Anurag once again but this time Anurag is with Aditi so she takes it in the wrong way and leaves from there in anger.
20	9	"To Be Or 32B"	Samar Iqbal, Harsh Dedhia	Nikhil Vyas, Kamayani Vyas, Sumrit Shahi	20 February 2021
Aditi tells Anurag that she has got a lead in the case with the help of a woman who was the witness in the hospital. Anurag calls Awasthi and they decide to meet. Chandni's Mom warms up to Radha, plans to take them shopping. Devika says it is a bad idea but Chandni says to give her mother the benefit of doubt. She is trying a different kind of sarees on Radha for her to buy. Chandni looks admiringly at her mother when she buys earrings for Radha. Their shopping ends with Chandni’s mother shopping lingerie at Marwah house. Devika cracks a deal with Meghna to start a business together. Aditi and Anurag go to meet Mr Awasthi at his residence along with the witness woman for giving him the proof of the on-going scam happening in the hospital. But they are shocked to see the witness woman takes a back step and says that they both have forced and threatened her to put all the wrong allegations against the hospital. Awasthi asks them to leave the topic and the city as well. Aditi kicks the ground hard in anger.
21	10	"Nayi Date Purani Debate"	Samar Iqbal, Harsh Dedhia	Nikhil Vyas, Kamayani Vyas, Sumrit Shahi	20 February 2021
Devika gets a call from Radha asking her to come asap as Chandni’s mother tries to get her married. Devika gets Chandni and Radha home. Chandni is very upset. Aditi tells Anurag that she has hacked Awasthi’s WhatsApp when she pushed the witness lady who in turn fell on Awasthi and his phone fell on the ground. Aditi picks up the phone for him and scans his WhatsApp through an app with her phone in seconds. Now they want to catch Awasthi red-handed. Devika starts doing lingerie deliveries and doing a good job with the work with Meghna. She goes to a hotel for the delivery as told by Meghna and is surprised to find Paritosh in the room. They go for a coffee date in the same café where she bumps into Anurag again. He tries to clear things with her but Aditi rushes in urgency and asks him to leave. Aditi and Anurag find out that the abortion cases happen at Awasthi’s private clinic and they must catch him red-handed this time. So, they reach his place and catch hold of Awasthi with bloodied gloves and hear the scream of a woman from inside the room.
22	11	"Sab Khatam, Almost"	Samar Iqbal, Harsh Dedhia	Nikhil Vyas, Kamayani Vyas, Sumrit Shahi	20 February 2021
Anurag and Aditi barge in the room shocked to see an old woman got a foot operation done. The Man Friday tells them that Mr Awasthi does all the charity surgeries and operations at his private clinic. When shocked and shattered Aditi and Anurag leave the place, the Man Friday breaks Awasthi’s phone and hands him a new phone by saying that nobody could read his messages again. Meanwhile, Chandni locks herself and tries to commit suicide. Devika, along with her family, takes her to the hospital and save her life. Radha blames herself for all this but Devika consoles her. Aditi and Anurag are still clueless about what has happened in the clinic but then they meet the witness woman again who tells them that they were right, and she does not have the courage to fight. They make yet another plan to trap the culprits. They record a fake confession video from an actor in Jaipur and show them to Awasthi at his daughter’s reception party. When Awasthi realises that he cannot escape anymore then he slits his throat with a knife at the party and leaves everyone shocked.
23	12	"Bin Bulaya Boyfriend"	Samar Iqbal, Harsh Dedhia	Nikhil Vyas, Kamayani Vyas, Sumrit Shahi	20 February 2021
Aditi and Anurag are packing their bags for Mumbai and remembering the incident where Awasthi kills himself out of fear. But in between Anurag gets a call from Radha about Chandni’s health. So he decides to stay in Jaipur for Chandni. Devika forces and takes Chandni’s Mom to meet her daughter once and is shocked to see Anurag there. Anurag is taking efforts to bring Chandni back to normal. Chandni tells Anurag that she can still see his love for Devika in his eyes. Meanwhile, Devika’s family insists Anurag stay with them for Chandni. Devika takes Anurag to his room where Anurag apologizes but she says no need to say sorry as they did not promise to be together, forever and it’s good for Chandni if he stays by her side. They get moments to spend some time with each other to clear the misunderstanding, but nothing seems to happen as she sees Aditi’s call on his phone. Devika gets angry and goes to meet Paritosh, where she confesses her interest in him. And they have a close moment.
24	13	"Do You Want A Threesome?"	Samar Iqbal, Harsh Dedhia	Nikhil Vyas, Kamayani Vyas, Sumrit Shahi	20 February 2021
Devika wakes up from a nightmare where she is sandwiched between Anurag and Paritosh. She calls Paritosh home for breakfast to make Anurag feel jealous and see his reactions. After breakfast, she shows him her bedroom where she intentionally kisses Paritosh after noticing Anurag, who’s crossing her room and seeing her through the window. Anurag gets agitated and angrily leaves from there. Chandni's Mom gets Babaji to Devika’s house to change Chandni’s behaviour and says she wants to get Chandni married to a boy. Devika in her retaliation says Chandni will get married but to Radha and gets Anurag’s support in this. Devika and Radha leave to buy a ring for Chandni as she wants to propose Chandni get married. Anurag decides to help too. While Radha is proposing to her, random people click their pictures and publish them in the newspapers the next day. The police come to the house and threaten Devika. She makes a resolution to get Chandni and Radha married.
25	14	"Dulhans Ki Doli"	Samar Iqbal, Harsh Dedhia	Nikhil Vyas, Kamayani Vyas, Sumrit Shahi	20 February 2021
Next day they all start preparing for the #radhachandniwedding along with Paritosh. They all go to see the venue suggested by Paritosh and approve of it. Everyone is busy making calls to different people and are marking on a board in between, as to their jobs being done. From making the guest list, food, decorations and the wedding outfits, everyone is busy with last-minute preparations. Chandni tells Anurag that she can still see love in his eyes for Devika and she knows that because of her they both were separated so now she only wants their reunion because they are perfect for each other. Anurag agrees with Chandni’s thought but still not sure about Devika and Paritosh’s relationship. Anurag is walking away dejected in a corridor where he dashes into Devika. They have a moment of closeness together. Devika is being mellow for a moment. Paritosh notices this moment happening and later asks Devika about their relationship status. Devika, who is conflicted, covers up and says that he is her present and Anurag was her past. Chandni and Radha walking towards the aisle, nervous, excited, as Devika leads them to the mandap and they all look happy beyond measure. They both get married. After the marriage function, Devika is shocked to find on her phone that Meghna is no more. She immediately rushes to Marwah house with Paritosh and asks Mrs Marwah what has happened to Meghna. She denied Mrs Marwah’s story of viral and food poisoning and recollected the flashes of the hospital where Devika had met Meghna looking dazed and Marwah had denied the pregnancy. She warns Mrs Marwah that she will reveal the truth soon. Paritosh forcefully drags her away from there to her home. Anurag overhears them when they are talking about Jan Janta hospital. Then he tells them about Aditi and his investigations and the on-going scam in the hospital. Paritosh asks them for proof. Suddenly, Aditi comes and tells them about the mastermind behind it all. She tells them that she has got the proof.
26	15	"Ex Ki GF Ka New Friend, Mera Boyfriend"	Samar Iqbal, Harsh Dedhia	Nikhil Vyas, Kamayani Vyas, Sumrit Shahi	20 February 2021
Aditi shows them an old Nokia mobile that she has received in Mumbai from an unknown person from Jan Janta Hospital. It was Awasthi’s phone which has chats from only one regular number and has got enough proof of Awasthi’s crime. Everyone including Paritosh is shocked to see all this. Paritosh offers his help in getting the CCTV footage of Awasthi’s cabin. Anurag suggests tracking the location of the unknown number with the help of a hacker and Paritosh asks to join him in that too. The hacker asks them to leave the phone with him as he would track the exact location by the next afternoon. Aditi is staying in Devika’s house as everyone insists. Devika is mighty affected by Anurag’s concern towards Aditi. Anurag is also quite affected by Paritosh’s care towards Devika. Paritosh gets beaten by the goons in the café all bloodied and curled up. They take his laptop. Devika, Aditi and Anurag rush in and Anurag tries to follow them as they run and when he comes back, he realizes that the laptop is gone. Man Friday is watching everything from far. Anurag gets a call from the hacker as he wants to give some information.
27	16	"Sex, Boys And Heartbreak"	Samar Iqbal, Harsh Dedhia	Nikhil Vyas, Kamayani Vyas, Sumrit Shahi	20 February 2021
Anurag rushes to the hacker's shop. He is frustrated as they haven’t got any lead yet. As soon as he opens his car door, the Man Friday barges in from the passenger side and sits next to him. Aditi and Devika are stressed as there is no trace of Anurag since morning. Aditi gets a call from Anurag’s number and Inspector Rathore on the call, tells them about Anurag’s accident, leaving both shocked. After reaching the accident site with everyone, Devika is disheartened and crying to see Anurag’s dead body. She is confessing her love to him which makes her family and Paritosh confused, shocked and they realise the true connection between them. 3 MONTHS LATER. WE HEAR A VERY CAUSTIC AND SHRILL LAUGHTER FROM DEVIKA. Paritosh meets Devika in a pub and takes her to her house as she is all drunk. She is now doomed into alcohol and random flings which makes Paritosh very angry. Aditi goes to the same cafeteria where Paritosh was beaten up and meets the manager. He takes Aditi to look at their CCTV footage of 3 months back when this happened. Aditi is shocked to see Man Friday through the footage. Her search is on, finding more clues about Anurag and Man Friday. She discusses Anurag’s case with the Inspector outside the police station too. She comes and meets Devika and tells her that Anurag was murdered, and she has some information about the murderer.
28	17	"DevDD 2.0 Hoon Main"	Samar Iqbal, Harsh Dedhia	Nikhil Vyas, Kamayani Vyas, Sumrit Shahi	20 February 2021
Police goes to Man Friday’s house with a search warrant along with Aditi and Devika. Police find the shirt whose button they had found in Anurag’s car. The man Friday tries to escape but Devika comes in the way, stops him and the police quickly latch onto him. The Man Friday is taken away by the police. The self-destructive Devika now apologizes to everyone around her, to her family, Chandni and to Paritosh. She is taken aback when Paritosh is expressing his feeling and tells her that Anurag should have taken him along to the hacker. Suddenly Devika’s eyes change, this is the revelation point for her. How did Paritosh know Anurag went to the hacker when only Aditi and she knows it? Aditi is taking leave from Devika and gives her a handbag as a parting gift which was given to her by Anurag and encourages her carefree and brave spirit for future endeavours. Paritosh is shocked when Devika tells him that she is pregnant with Anurag’s child and she wants to abort it and start afresh with him. Paritosh does not know how to handle it but later agrees to help Devika. He agrees to arrange everything in the hospital at 8 pm. As she goes there, Paritosh starts the procedure. Devika gets to know that Paritosh is the Doctor who is going to do the abortion. He is shocked to find that she is not pregnant. The eccentric side of Paritosh is revealed now. Like others, he now wants to kill Devika too. Devika tells him that his crime confession is recorded by the hidden camera in the handbag. There is a brief altercation between them for the handbag. Devika throws the bag at Aditi who’s there with the police. She catches it. The police catch hold of him and he is escorted out. In the end, we see a friendly bond among Chandni, Radha, Aditi and Devika who all are happily discussing Devika next move in life.

== Reception ==
=== Critical response ===
Anvita Singh of India Today stated that Bra, booze, and expletives: Dev DD's heroine tries hard to be a rebel with a cause, but fails. They tried to hard, but failed at the end. The writers at some point made a stamp with 2-3 good instances. Overall show is watchable as an optional if you have time.
