= Durga Aur Charu =

Post-independence Indian social & period drama

- Genre: Drama
- Created by: Shashi Mittal; Sumeet Hukamchand Mittal
- Written by: Shashi Mittal; Sumeet Hukamchand Mittal; Amitabh Singh
- Directed by: Bhagyasree Ananda Jadhav
- Starring: See below
- Theme music composer: Ashish Rego
- Composers: Anish John; Singers; Mukund Suryavanshi; Shreya Phukan
- Country of origin: India
- Original language: Hindi
- No. of seasons: 2
- No. of episodes: 86

Production
- Producers: Shashi Mittal; Sumeet Hukamchand Mittal; Apoorv Jaiswal
- Cinematography: Abhishek Basu Sudesh Kotian
- Camera setup: Multi-Camera
- Running time: 20-59 minutes
- Production company: Shashi Sumeet Productions

Original release
- Network: Colors TV
- Release: 12 December 2022 – 14 April 2023

Related
- Barrister Babu

Durga Aur Charu is an Indian Hindi-language soap opera by Shashi Sumeet Productions, which broadcast on Colors TV. It aired from 12 December 2022 to 14 April 2023 and starred Rachi Sharma, Adrija Roy and Kunal Jaisingh in lead roles. It is a sequel of Barrister Babu.

== Plot ==
Aniruddh and Bondita are taking their daughters, Durga and Devi, to Darjeeling for their 5th birthday, when the family are in a terrible car crash. Aniruddh and Bondita die, and Durga is thrown from the car into a bush by the side of the road; Devi, still in the car, suffers a head injury and loses her memory. The other driver rushes to the scene of the crash, where he finds Devi with her dead parents, and takes her with him, leaving behind the unconscious Durga.

=== 5 years later ===
Durga is struggling with nightmares about the accident and with fear of Sumona and her husband Polash, who bully the girl and plan to get the whole Roy Chowdhury property in their own name. Meanwhile, Devi, now called Charu, has been adopted by circus workers called Banke and Bholi, and does fearless acrobatics, but she dreams of getting a proper education and becoming a barrister. The two girls share a special connection, which allows each of them to feel the other's pain.

Binoy angers Sumona by deciding to take Durga to a better hospital in Delhi for treatment. The girls see each other, and Charu tries to run away from her adoptive parents, only to be caught and sold to a brothel. With Durga's help, she and her adopted sister, Chumki, manage to escape, and she comes with Durga to Kolkata. There, Charu fights off Durga's bullies, and the two girls perform a Shradh puja ceremony for their parents.

Soon after, Charu figures out that Kalnemi, whom Durga is afraid of, is Polash in disguise. Polash denies it, blames someone else, and tries to manipulate Sampoorna, but Sampoorna and Binoy are impressed by Charu and decide to adopt her.

Meanwhile, Sheru, the owner of the brothel, has threatened Bholi that unless she returns Charu and Chumki to him, he will take her in their place. Bholi and Banke travel to Kolkata; Bholi insinuates herself into the family, while Banke takes out a loan from Binoy. On Durga Puja, Banke sees a portrait of Aniruddh and Bondita and realizes everything. To prevent him from coming clean to Binoy and Sampoorna, Bholi has Sheru kill him.

Bholi then introduces Chumki to the family as Devi and has her accuse Durga of hitting her, claims that Charu killed Banke, and Charu is arrested. With Durga's help, Charu escapes and disguises herself as Chaturvuj to evade Bholi and the police. She tries to blackmail Bholi, but it backfires. She is saved by Banke, who is alive but has lost his memory. Eventually, Bholi manages to get Charu arrested again, and Durga swears to Sampoorna to never meet Charu again. Durga is sent to study in Darjeeling, and Charu, who thinks the twelve years she is facing in prison are Durga's fault, is devastated.

=== 12 years later ===
Durga and Charu, now grown up, have both become barristers, despite Charu still being in prison. Charu blames Durga for her imprisonment and thinks of her as an enemy, but Durga has secretly been sending all of her pocket money for Charu's education.

Anirban Banerjee, the son of a wealthy family yearns for his mother's love who was manipulated by his step-mother meets Charu, and Durga and helps them clearing their misunderstanding, and uniting Durga and Charu. Bholi is arrested and ask Chumki to never let Roy Chowdhury family learn that Charu is actually Devi not Chumki herself.

== Cast ==
=== Main ===
- Rachi Sharma as Barrister Durga Roy Chowdhury: Aniruddh and Bondita's elder daughter; Devi's twin sister; Anirban's ex-fiancee (2023)
  - Aurra Bhatnagar Badoni as Child Durga Roy Chowdhury (2022–2023)
- Adrija Roy as Barrister Devi "Charu" Banerjee (née Roy Chowdhury): Aniruddh and Bondita's younger daughter; Durga's twin sister; Anirban's wife (2023)
  - Vaishnavi Prajapati as Child Devi "Charu" Roy Chowdhury (2022–2023)
- Mohit Kumar/Kunal Jaisingh as Anirban Banerjee: Abhiroop's elder son; Durga's ex-fiance; Devi's husband (2023)

==== Recurring ====
- Chandan K Anand as Binoy Roy Chowdhury: Trilochan's brother (2022-2023)
- Pravisht Mishra as Barrister Aniruddh Roy Chowdhury: Binoy and Shubhra's eldest son (2022)
- Anchal Sahu as Barrister Bondita Das Roy Chowdhury: Arvind and Sumati's daughter (2022)
- Jyoti Mukherjee as Sampoorna Jadhav Roy Chowdhury: Sundaram and Devoleena's daughter (2022–2023)
- Kaushiki Rathore as Shashwati "Sumona" Roy Chowdhury: Binoy and Sampoorna's daughter (2022–2023)
- Sayantan Banerjee as Polash: Sumona's husband (2022-2023)
- Sudeep Sarangi as Bankey: Bholi's husband (2022-2023)
- Preeti Amin as Bholi aka Neem ki Goli: Bankey's wife (2022–2023)
- Srushti Tare as Chumki: Fake Devi; Bankey and Bholi's daughter (2023)
  - Ayesha Vindhara as Child Chumki (2022–2023)
- Harsh Vashisht as Abhiroop Banerjee: Mrs. Banerjee's elder son (2023)
- Monica Khanna as Latika Banerjee: Abhiroop's second wife (2023)
- Dolly Minhas as Mrs. Banerjee: Abhiroop's mother (2023)
- Preeti Puri as Savitri Banerjee: Mr. Banerjee's wife (2023)
- Jignesh Joshi as Mr. Banerjee: Mrs. Banerjee's younger son (2023)

== Development ==
On 31 January 2023, Colors TV unveiled a teaser to introduce the new actors, Rachi Sharma and Adrija Roy as grown-up Durga and Charu.

It went off air on 14 April 2023.
