= Rumana Molla =

American-Belgian actress

- Born: West Virginia, United States
- Occupation: Actress
- Years active: 2014–present
- Known for: Pyaar Ka Punchnama 2 Irada; Dev DD

Rumana Molla is an American-Belgian actress who is based in Belgium and India and works predominantly in Indian cinema.

== Early life and career ==
Molla was born in West Virginia to Indian Bengali parents and grew up in Brussels, Belgium. She made her Bollywood debut in the movies Ek Villain and Pyaar Ka Punchnama 2. She also starred in Indian web series Dev DD and the sports drama based on cricket Game of the Sexes in 2021.

Molla is also a part of the governance team of the European Haemophilia Consortium.

== Filmography ==
=== Film ===
Year	Title	Role	Notes
2014	Ek Villain	Nidhi	Debut
2015	Pyaar Ka Punchnama 2	Ruchi	
2017	Irada	Riya Walia	
2017	Bhangarh: The Last Episode	Rumana	
2019	Trial of Satyam Kaushik	Sreeja Kapoor	TV movie
2020	Virgin Bhanupriya	Rukul Preet Singh	
2021	Bawri Chhori	Ana	

=== Television ===
Year	Title	Role	Notes
2016	Life Sahi Hai	Divya	
2016	It's Not That Simple	Reha	TV mini series

=== Web series ===
Year	Title	Role	Notes
2017–2021	Dev DD	Radha	ALTBalaji
2021	Game of the Sexes	Aarushi	
