= Akhil Kapur =

Indian actor (born 1985)

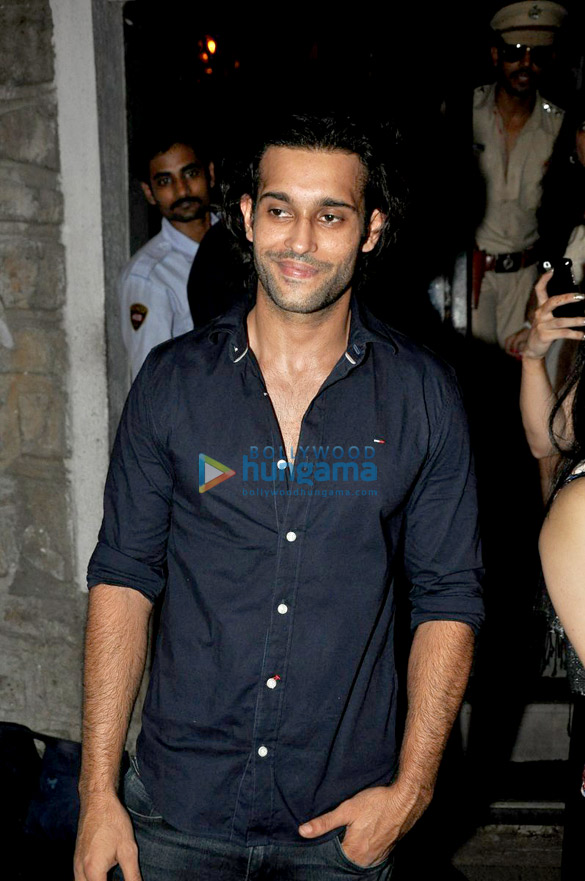
- Kapoor in 2014
- Born: 26 August 1985 (age 41); Dubai, United Arab Emirates
- Occupation: Actor

Akhil Kapur is an Indian actor.

== Biography ==
Kapur was born on 26 August 1985 in Dubai, United Arab Emirates. He is Vinod Khanna's nephew. He made his acting career debut with Desi Kattey in 2014. In 2017, he acted in ALT Balaji's web series Dev DD.

== Filmography ==
=== Film ===
Year	Film	Role	Note
2014	Desi Kattey	Pali	Debut film

=== Web series ===
Year	Title	Role	Network
2017	Dev DD	Parth	ALT Balaji

=== Other positions ===
Year	Film	Director	Writer	Producer	Notes
2026	Candy and the Pizza Ggirl	Yes	Yes	Yes	Debut as director
