= Desi Kattey =

2014 Hindi film directed by Anand Kumar

- First look poster
- Directed by: Anand Kumar
- Written by: Aaryaan Saxena; Rahul Ramchandani
- Produced by: Anand Kumar
- Starring: Sunil Shetty; Jay Bhanushali; Akhil Kapur; Zahrah S. Khan
- Cinematography: S. R. Sathish Kumar
- Edited by: Bunty Nagi
- Music by: Kailash Kher
- Production company: Anand Kumar Productions
- Release date: 26 September 2014
- Running time: 137 minutes
- Country: India
- Language: Hindi

Desi Kattey (transl. Country-made pistols) is a 2014 Indian Hindi-language action drama film directed and produced by Anand Kumar under the banner of Anand Kumar Productions. It stars Sunil Shetty in the lead role. The music for the film was composed by Kailash Kher. The film was released on 26 September 2014 to highly negative reviews.

== Cast ==
- Sunil Shetty as Lieutenant Major Suryakant Rathore
- Jay Bhanushali as Gyani
- Akhil Kapur as Pali
- Sasha Agha as Paridhi Rathore
- Tia Bajpai as Guddi
- Ashutosh Rana
- Murli Sharma
- Nishikant Dixit as Jailer Shukla
- Santosh Shukla
- Claudia Ciesla as an item number Patne Wali Hoon

== Production ==
=== Filming ===
Filming locations included Puri, Delhi, Kanpur and Mumbai.

== Soundtrack ==
The soundtrack of Desi Kattey was composed by Kailash Kher.

=== Track listing ===
| No. | Title | Singer(s) | Length |
|---|---|---|---|
| 1. | "Patnewaali" | Rekha Bhardwaj, Hard Kaur | 3.36 |
| 2. | "Tak Dhoom" | Rahet Fateh Ali Khan | 5.16 |
| 3. | "Albeliya" | Shreya Ghoshal | 4.57 |
| 4. | "Bas Tum Ho" | Akriti Kakkar | 2.11 |
| 5. | "Daagh De" | Kailash Kher | 2.19 |
| 6. | "Patnewaali" (DJ Mix) | Hard Kaur | 3.40 |
| Total length: | | | 0:21:19 |

== Reception ==
Sukanya Verma of Rediff.com rated the film 1/5 stars and wrote, "Desi Kattey is an insipid mishmash of just about every script engaging two friends going separate ways meets underdog sports hero". A critic from the Hindustan Times wrote, "Desi Kattey is one of those films, we say, you should not waste your time on. Films like these are best watched on TV, with your friends so that you can laugh on them".
