= Candy and the Pizza Ggirl =

2026 Hindi-language movie

- Directed by: Akhil Kapur
- Written by: Abhishek Bhatnagar; Akhil Kapur
- Produced by: Poonam Kapur; Akhil Kapur; Shiva Malani; Aaryaan Saxena
- Starring: Ninad Kamat; Priya Banerjee; Shivani Singh; Dara Sandhu; Nimish Shitole; Aniket Sanghavi
- Cinematography: Sandeep Mishra
- Production companies: Full Moon Studioz; India Film Factory
- Distributed by: Amazon Prime Video
- Release date: 10 April 2026
- Running time: 102 minutes
- Country: India
- Language: Hindi

Candy and the Pizza Ggirl is a 2026 Indian Hindi-language dark comedy thriller film written and directed by Akhil Kapur in his directorial debut. The film is produced by Poonam Kapur, Akhil Kapur, and Shiva Malani under the banner of Full Moon Studioz, in association with Elefante Blanco Pictures and India Film Factory. It stars Ninad Kamat, Priya Banerjee, and Shivani Singh in leading roles.

The film follows an interconnected series of surreal misadventures occurring over a single full-moon night in Mumbai. It premiered digitally on Amazon Prime Video on 10 April 2026.

== Plot ==
The narrative is a non-linear exploration of Mumbai's nightlife during a Saturday full moon. The story focuses on three central figures: Bobby (Ninad Kamat), an aging socialite who believes he is in total control despite his life unraveling; Candy (Shivani Singh), an influencer obsessed with social validation; and a mysterious woman known as the "Pizza Ggirl" (Priya Banerjee), whose unpredictable actions trigger a city-wide domino effect of chaos. The film employs a "genre-bending" approach, blending elements of satire, dark comedy, and psychological drama.

== Cast ==
- Ninad Kamat as Bobby
- Priya Banerjee as Pizza Girl
- Shivani Singh as Candy
- Dara Sandhu
- Nimish Shitole
- Aniket Sanghavi

== Production ==
The film marks the first feature project for Full Moon Studioz. Director Akkhil Kapur stated that the non-linear narrative was chosen because "chaos doesn't move in straight lines," aiming to represent the "parallel realities" of Mumbai's residents. Cinematographer Sandeep Mishra used neon-heavy lighting to capture the "Maximum City" aesthetic.

== Music ==
The film's soundscape was designed to reflect the frenetic energy of a single night, though a traditional soundtrack album details were not initially released at the time of the trailer launch.

== Release ==
The first-look posters were released on 2 April 2026, followed by the official trailer on 8 April 2026. The film began streaming on Amazon Prime Video on 10 April 2026.

== Critical reception ==
Vinamra Mathur for the First Post called it "the most absurd comedy of the year", though also saying that "Ninad Kamat & Shivani Singh shine in." First India calls it "a bold, offbeat ride that thrives in its own madness." Renu Tiwari from Prabha Sakshi declared that the movie has style but the story is nothing more than noise and confusion. Jaya Dwivedie from India TV declared it a "stylish dark comedy loses grip in chaotic storytelling". Pune Mirror said "Candy and the Pizza Ggirl shines in wild, unforgettable OTT debut." Simran Singh from DNA praised the movie, saying, "in the age of Dhurandhar, Ninad Kamat-starrer breathes new life into adult-comedy genre." India Forums calls it "a wildly ambitious debut that is as messy as it is fascinating.".
