= Jason Shah =

British actor and fitness model (born 1987)

- Born: 14 December 1987 (age 38); Ireland
- Occupations: Actor, model
- Years active: 2007–present

Jason Shah (born 14 December 1987) is a British actor and fitness model. He has participated in the 10th season of the Indian reality TV show Bigg Boss as a wildcard entrant, and played Captain Hugh Ross in Jhansi Ki Rani on Colors TV. He also played the role of Sir John Greenwood in Barrister Babu. Recently was featured in Sanjay Leela Bhansali directed Netflix series Heeramandi.

== Early life and career ==
Shah was born to a British mother and an American father. His mother remarried an Indian man of Gujarati origin. He attended New York Film Academy and graduated from the University of Memphis. He was featured in the 2007 film Partner, played the groom of Katrina Kaif in the "Dupatta Tera Nau Rang Da" music video, and starred in an ad for Van Heusen. He made his Bollywood debut in the 2016 film Fitoor, which featured Aditya Roy Kapoor and Katrina Kaif in the lead roles.

Shah participated in the Indian reality show Bigg Boss 10 as a wild card entrant. He faced criticism in the news for alleging that his Bollywood career was cut short by Katrina Kaif, telling fellow contestants that it was Kaif's fault that he went unnoticed in Fitoor, stating that his cameo was cut short as a result of Kaif wanting to re-shoot her opening scenes in the movie.

He currently resides in Mumbai, India.

== Filmography ==
=== Films ===
Year	Title	Role	Language	Notes
2007	Partner	Groom	Hindi	Uncredited role
2016	Fitoor	Cameo	Hindi	Uncredited role
2018	Thugs of Hindostan	East India Company Officer	Hindi	
2023	August 16 1947	Justin	Tamil	
2023	Conjuring Kannappan	Soldier William	Tamil	
2023	Salaar: Part 1 – Ceasefire	Consignment owner	Telugu	
2024	Mission: Chapter 1	Supervising Officer Neil Johnson	Tamil	
2024	Jigra	Matthew	Hindi	
2026	Nagabandham	Tesla	Telugu	
2026	Jana Nayagan	Himmler's friend	Tamil	

=== Television ===
Year	Title	Role	Notes
2016	Bigg Boss 10	Wild Card Contestant	13th place
2018	Chandrashekhar	John Nott-Bower	
2019	Khoob Ladi Mardaani – Jhansi Ki Rani	Hugh Rose, 1st Baron Strathnairn	
2020	Barrister Babu	Officer Sir John Greenwood	
2022	Swaraj	Vasco Da Gama	
2024	Heeramandi: The Diamond Bazaar	Alastair Cartwright	Netflix series
2026	The Revolutionaries	General Dyer	Amazon Prime Video series

=== Web series ===
Year 2024	Title	Role	Notes
2017	Dev DD	Philip	
2020	State of Siege: 26/11		
2021	Dev DD 2		
2024	Heeramandi	Cartwright	
