= Payal Gupta =

Indian television actress

- Born: 22 November 1996 (age 29); Madhya Pradesh, India
- Occupation: Television Actress
- Years active: 2017–present
- Known for: RadhaKrishn; Banni Chow Home Delivery

Payal Gupta is an Indian television actress.

== Television ==
Year	show	character name	channel
2018–2019	Vighnaharta Ganesh	Maharani Sarala	Sony Entertainment Television
2019-2020	Namah Lakshmi Narayan	Neela	Star Plus
2020	Pyaar Tune Kya Kiya	Sambhavi	Zing
2021	Teri Laadli Main	Siddhi	Star Bharat
2021	Daaman Mitti Kaa		DD Kisan
2021	RadhaKrishn	Bhadra	Star Bharat
2021	Crime Alert – Pyaar Ki Neelami	Vidhi	Dangal
2021–2022	Meri Doli Mere Angana	Vibha	Azaad
2022–2023	Banni Chow Home Delivery	Charmi Viraj Singh Rathore	Star Plus
2023	Meet: Badlegi Duniya Ki Reet	Pankhuri Chaudhary	Zee TV
2024	main dil tum dhadkan	vishakha	sheemaroo umang
2026 - Present	Bareilly Ke Bacchan	Pooja	Colors TV

== Web series ==
Year	Show	Role	Channel
2019	Thinkistan	Bertha	MX Player

== Music Videos ==
Year	Song	Role	Channel
2018	Muddato Baad	Megha	YouTube
2022	Naina Jadugar		YouTube
