= Banni Chow Home Delivery =

Indian television series by Shashi Sumeet Productions

- Genre: Psychological; Mystery; Drama; Romance
- Created by: Snehashis Chakraborty
- Written by: Raghuvir Shekhawat
- Screenplay by: Mallika Dutt; Ritu Goel; Rachel Navare
- Story by: Mallika Dutt; Shashwati D Mishra
- Directed by: Jaladh K. Sharma
- Creative directors: Imran Mir; Naveen Mirja
- Starring: Ulka Gupta; Pravisht Mishra
- Country of origin: India
- Original language: Hindi
- No. of seasons: 1
- No. of episodes: 202

Production
- Producers: Sumeet Hukamchand Mittal; Shashi Mittal; Jitendra Singla
- Cinematography: Ajay Lalta Gupta; Vipul Virendra Singh
- Editors: Jay B Ghadiali; Saurabh Raj Khanna
- Camera setup: Multi-camera
- Running time: 20–22 minutes
- Production company: Shashi Sumeet Productions

Original release
- Network: StarPlus
- Release: 30 May 2022 – 3 January 2023

Banni Chow Home Delivery is an Indian Hindi-language television drama series that premiered on 30 May 2022 on StarPlus. It streams digitally on Disney+ Hotstar. Produced by Shashi Mittal and Sumeet Mittal under Shashi Sumeet Productions it stars Ulka Gupta and Pravisht Mishra. It is a remake of Star Jalsha's Bengali series Khukumoni Home Delivery.

== Premise ==
Banni has a catering and door-to-door food delivery business. She soon crosses paths with Yuvan, a mentally disabled man whom she eventually marries as a compromise. The show follows how Banni protects Yuvan from her in-laws, who mentally and physically abused him, and she explores his musical talent and decides to make him a rockstar despite his mental illness.

Agastya, a rockstar, enters their lives initially as a storm, but later ends up falling for Banni. Yuvan's childhood friend, Tulika also returns, who loves and is loved, by Kabir, Yuvan's split personality.

With Yuvan suffering from split personality disorder, the three of them aim to cure him, holding back their emotions just for Yuvan and Banni's happiness and union.

== Cast ==
=== Main ===
- Ulka Gupta as Banni Yuvan (Kabir) Singh Rathod: A home delivery agent; Yuvan's (Kabir) wife; Agastya's love interest; Atharva's (Khannah)step-mother (2022–2023)
- Pravisht Mishra as
  - Yuvan Singh Rathod: A singer and musician with special needs; Banni‘s Husband; Hemant and Vandana's son; Manini's step-son; Palak and Myra's half-brother; Atharva's father (2022–2023)
  - Kabir Singh Rathore: Yuvan's split personality; Banni’s Husband; Manini's step-son; Palak and Myra's half-brother; Tulika's husband (dead); Atharva's (Khannah) father

=== Recurring ===
- Riya Sharma as Dr. Tulika Anand: Yuvan's childhood friend Bunty; Kabir's wife; Atharva's mother; Agastya's friend (2022)
- Arjit Taneja as Agastya Kapoor: Yuvan's mentor and judge; Param's son; Banni's one-sided lover (2022)
- Rajendra Chawla as Devraj Singh Rathod: Sulekha's brother; Hemant and Veer's father (2022–2023)
- Parvati Sehgal as Manini Rathod: An entrepreneur; Prateek's sister; Hemant's second wife; Palak and Myra's mother; Yuvan's step-mother (2022)
- Vishal Puri as Hemant Singh Rathod: Devraj's estranged elder son; Veer's estranged brother; Vandana's widower and murderer; Manini's husband; Yuvan, Palak and Myra's estranged father (2022)
- Harsh Vashisht as Veer Singh Rathod: Devraj's younger son; Hemant's estranged brother; Vrinda's husband; Viraj's father (2022–2023)
- Preeti Arora Sharma as Vrinda Rathod: Veer's wife; Viraj's mother (2022–2023)
- Ayush Anand as Viraj Singh Rathod: Veer and Vrinda's son; Charmie's husband (2022-2023)
- Nikhat Khan Hegde as Sulekha: Devraj's sister; Alpana and Anchal's mother (2022–2023)
- Anushka Merchande as Palak Rathod: Manini and Hemant's elder daughter; Myra's sister; Yuvan's half-sister (2022)
- Palak Agarwal as Myra Rathod: Manini and Hemant's younger daughter; Palak's sister; Yuvan's half-sister (2022–2023)
- Payal Gupta as Charmie Rathod: Viraj's wife (2022–2023)
- Manasi Sengupta as Anchal: Sulekha's elder daughter; Alpana's sister (2022–2023)
- Pooja Singh as Alpana: Sulekha's younger daughter; Anchal's sister (2022–2023)
- Alpesh Dixit as Suresh: Banni's uncle; Vishnu's father; a drunkard and a gambler (2022–2023)
- Neelam Gupta as Banni's maternal aunt: Suresh's wife; Vishnu's mother (2022-2023)
- Ansh Pandey as Vishnu: Suresh's son (2022–2023)
- Vaishnavi Mahant as Vandana Rathod: Hemant's first wife; Yuvan's mother (2022)
- Nirbhay Wadhwa as SP Amarjeet Singh Brar; IPS Officer Banni and Yuvan's helper (2022)
- Manish Khanna as Param Kapoor: Agastya's father (2022)
- Neha Rana as Niyati (2022)
- Unknown as Atharva Singh Rathore: Tulika and Yuvan's son; Banni's step-son

=== Guest ===
- Celesti Bairagey as Rajjo to promote Rajjo

== Production ==
=== Casting ===
Ulka Gupta was cast as Banni Chow. This show also marks her return after a six-year hiatus. Talking about her comeback on the small screen, Ulka says, "It was a completely natural process that I let myself flow with. After doing a couple of movies in Bollywood and down south, 'Banni Chow Home Delivery' was one of the right opportunities I decided to make my comeback with."

Ayush Anand was roped in for a pivotal role. Aamir Khan’s sister, Nikhat Khan also made her television debut through the same.

Arjit Taneja was roped in to play Rockstar Agastya Kapoor. Speaking on the same, he said, "I was looking for something that could challenge me as an actor and the Banni Chow offer came at the right time. I will have a grand entry as a rockstar and it will bring along a lot of mystery and suspense."

Riya Sharma was cast to play Dr. Tulika. On her entrance, she said, "I am very excited to be a part of the show as well as a bit nervous as Banni and Yuvan have great chemistry. And I am enjoying it as much as the audience does. I know people will go crazy seeing me between these two lovely love birds and wonder who is coming between them and why is she coming, but the story goes on for the audience."

=== Broadcast ===
The show suffered a change in time slot from 9pm to 6:30pm from 2 November 2022 onward. Speaking on this the producer, Sumeet Mittal, said, "Honestly, we are not disappointed. We agree that there were higher expectations in terms of ratings from a show that aired at 9pm. We are now working towards getting a good viewership in the new time slot."

=== Release ===
The first promo was unveiled in February 2022 starring Ulka Gupta as Banni.

== Television special ==
=== Ravivaar With Star Parivaar (2022) ===
The cast of Banni Chow Home Delivery participated in Ravivaar With Star Parivaar, a musical competition wherein eight StarPlus shows competed against each other to win the title of "Best Parivaar". Banni Chow Home Delivery emerged as the 5th runner-up of the show.
