= Bareilly Ke Bacchan =

2026 Indian family drama television series

- Genre: Family drama; Comedy; Romance
- Created by: Aarooshee Sood
- Based on: Ayyanar Thunai by Priya Thambi
- Developed by: Priya Thambi
- Written by: Dialogue: Rohit Malhotra
- Directed by: Shashank Bharadwaj
- Creative director: Mohit Dhawan
- Starring: Pravisht Mishra; Ramneek Kataria; Kinshuk Mahajan
- Country of origin: India
- Original language: Hindi
- No. of seasons: 1
- No. of episodes: 140

Production
- Producer: Aarooshee Sood
- Camera setup: Multi-camera
- Running time: 20 minutes
- Production company: AORAA Pictures

Original release
- Network: Colors TV
- Release: 8 June 2026 – present

Bareilly Ke Bacchan is an Indian Hindi-language family drama television series that premiered on 8 June 2026 on Colors TV and streams digitally on JioHotstar. Produced by AORAA Pictures, it stars Pravisht Mishra, Ramneek Kataria, and Kinshuk Mahajan. It is a remake of Star Vijay's Tamil series Ayyanar Thunai.

== Plot ==
The series is set in the town of Bareilly, Uttar Pradesh, and revolves around the eccentric, dysfunctional, and all-male Bacchan household. Led by the stubborn family patriarch, Ajab Singh Bacchan, the household comprises his four unfiltered sons who have lived for years entirely devoid of any female presence or influence. The brothers each represent a unique layer of the chaotic domestic ecosystem: Ganga, the soft-spoken eldest brother who acts as the makeshift mother-figure; Krishna, a charming taxi driver on a constant quest to find true love; Satluj, an explosive and hot-headed young man; and Mahi, the youngest of the pack.

The narrative kicks off when Krishna crosses paths with Sangam Yadav, an ambitious, clear-headed college topper whose dreams of pursuing her education and career constantly clash with her traditional father’s rigid plans to marry her off. Sangam is initially arranged to marry an arrogant man named Vicky, who dismisses her career ambitions. Krishna, falling in a one-sided love with Sangam, takes up a job as Vicky's driver to stay close to her and protect her interests.

Through a twist of fate and the collapse of her initial arranged alliance, Sangam ends up marrying the carefree Krishna. The core conflict of the show explores the ultimate cultural and domestic clash when Sangam - a strong-willed, goal-oriented modern woman—enters the unkempt, rowdy Bacchan house as the first daughter-in-law. The plot follows Sangam's daily struggles to navigate a household of men completely unaccustomed to living with a woman, as she attempts to bring order to their unruly lives while fighting to keep her own personal ambitions alive. Sangam developes soft corner for Bacchans and gradually adjusts in Bacchan family. She with Krishna, Satluj and Mahi starts to find a bride for Ganga amidst she comes to know that Ganga loves Aarti. Somehow Sangam arranges Ganga and Aarti's wedding but it fails as Manorma stops aarti from marrying Ganga. Aarti's parents fixes let aarti marry a lawyer, Sudhanshu, despite Aarti's wish to marry Ganga. It is revealed that Ajab Singh didn't kill his wife. it were Bhushan and Manorama who framed Ajab Singh of murder of his wife to take his property. Ajab Singh remained in jail for several years, where he became a drunker. It is revealed that Mahi is his adopted son, as his friend's wife handover him to Ajab after her husband's death and she did not able to raise him .

== Cast ==
=== Main ===
- Pravisht Mishra as Krishna Bacchan: Ajab's second son; Ganga and Satluj's brother; Mahi's adoptive brother; Sangam's husband (2026–present)
- Ramneek Kataria as Sangam Yadav Bacchan: Raghuvendra and Sushila's daughter; Nirgun's sister; Krishna's wife (2026–present)

=== Recurring ===
- Kinshuk Mahajan as Ganga Bacchan: Ajab's eldest son; Krishna and Satluj's brother; Mahi's adoptive brother; Aarti's love interest (2026–present)
- Yashpal Sharma as Ajab Bacchan: Patriarch of Bacchan family; Ganga, Krishna and Satluj's father; Mahi's adoptive father (2026–present)
- Ansh Manuja as Satluj "Sattu" Bacchan: Ajab's youngest son; Ganga and Krishna's brother; Mahi's adoptive brother (2026–present)
- Sachin Jeet Singh as Mahi Bacchan: Ajab's adoptive son; Ganga, Krishna and Satluj's adoptive brother (2026–present)
- Govind Pandey as Raghuvendra Yadav: Sushila's husband; Sangam and Nirgun's father; Mansha's grandfather (2026–present)
- Anita Kulkarni as Sushila Yadav: Raghuvendra's wife; Sangam and Nirgun's mother; Mansha's grandmother (2026–present)
- Akash Sahay as Nirgun Yadav: Raghuvendra and Sushila's son; Sangam's brother; Hema's husband; Mansha's father (2026–present)
- Radhika Chhabra as Hema Yadav: Nirgun's wife; Mansha's mother (2026–present)
- Devanshi Dabas as Mansha Yadav: Nirgun and Hema's daughter (2026–present
- Unknown as Bhushan: Manorama's husband; Aarti's father (2026–present)
- Tripti Agarwal as Manorama "Kaki": Bhushan's wife; Aarti's mother (2026–present)
- Suchi Birgi as Aarti: Manorama and Bhushan's daughter; Ganga's love-interest; Sudhanshu's wife (2026-present)
- Payal Gupta as Pooja: Satluj's love-interest (2026-present)
- Deepak Kumar Verma as Chotu: Satluj's employee (2026-present)
- Vicky Nayyar as Vicky Yaduvanshi: Sangam's ex-fiance (2026-present)
- Nidhi Mishra as Kiara (2026)
- Manas Adhiya as Advocate Sudhanshu: Aarti's husband (2026)
- Vanita Hariharan as Mahi's biological mother (2026–present)

=== Guest appearances ===
- Daksh Puri as Aarav Ahuja from Shayad Yahi Hai Pyaar (2026)
- Aditi Sharma as Preeti Arora from Shayad Yahi Hai Pyaar (2026)

== Production ==
=== Casting ===
Pravisht Mishra was confirmed to play male lead, Krishna. While, Kinshuk Mahajan joined the show as Ganga Bacchan. Yashpal Sharma also joined the show marking his return to television after 12 years.

=== Release ===
The first promo of this series was released in April 2026. The series was released on 8 June 2026.

== Awards and nominations ==
Year	Award	Category	Recipient	Result	Ref.
2026	Indian Television Academy Awards	Best Actress - Comedy - TV	Ramneek Kataria	Pending	
2026	Indian Television Academy Awards	Best Supporting Performance - Comedy - TV	Yashpal Sharma	Pending	
2026	Indian Television Academy Awards	Best Costume Designer - TV	Anirban Haldar	Pending	
2026	Indian Television Academy Awards	Best Dialogue - Comedy - TV	Rohit Malhotra	Pending	
