= Chandan K Anand =

Indian television actor

Chandan Kumar Anand
- Born: Delhi, India
- Occupation: Actor
- Years active: 2005–present

Chandan K Anand is an Indian actor who works in Hindi films. He has played the role of Dr. Ram Nandan Bhosale in the 2026 blockbuster movie Hanuman Ansh .

== Filmography ==
=== Films ===
Year	Title	Role	Notes
2005	Mr Ya Miss		
2007	Kaafila	Deep Singh	
2007	Chain Kulii Ki Main Kulii	Wasim	
2009	Aloo Chaat	Sukka	
2009	Love Aaj Kal		
2015	Parched	Rajesh	
2016	1962 My Country Land		
2019	The Body	Keith Suliman	
2020	Bamfaad	SP Nagar	
2020	Gunjan Saxena: The Kargil Girl	Chief Instructor Ashish Ahuja	
2024	Fighter	Wing Commander Harish Nautiyal "Nauty"	
2025	Deva	Mandar Soorti	
2025	Homebound	Haroon Nawaz	
2026	Hanuman Ansh	Bhonsle	

=== Television ===
Year	Serial	Role	Channel	Notes
2010	Yeh Pyar Na Hoga Kam	Omi	Colors TV	
2013–2014	The Adventures of Hatim	Zargam	Life OK	
2014–2015	Jab Jab Bahar Aayee		DD National	
2014–2015	Dharmakshetra	Yudhishthir	Epic TV	
2015	Stories by Rabindranath Tagore	Upen	Epic TV	
2015–2016	Bhaage Re Mann	Raghav Vajpayee	Zindagi	
2017	Prem Ya Paheli – Chandrakanta	Kroor Singh	Life OK	
2019	Khoob Ladi Mardaani – Jhansi Ki Rani	Ghaus Khan	Colors TV	
2020–2021	Barrister Babu	Barrister Binoy Roy Choudhary	Colors TV	
2022	Meet: Badlegi Duniya Ki Reet	Abhay Rana	Zee TV	
2022–2023	Ali Baba	Saddam	Sony SAB	
2022–2023	Durga Aur Charu	Barrister Binoy Roy Choudhary	Colors TV	
2024–2025	Shaitani Rasmein	Vikram Gehlot	Star Bharat	
2026–present	Hastinapur Ke Veer	Shakuni	Sony SAB	

=== Web series ===
Year	Title	Role	Platform	Notes
2019	Rangbaaz	Ranjan Tiwari	ZEE5	
2023	Class	Suraj Ahuja	Netflix	
2023	Campus Beats	Sekhawat	Amazon Prime Video	
