= Pravisht Mishra =

Indian television actor

- Born: Mumbai, Maharashtra, India
- Education: Graduation in Physiotherapy
- Years active: 2011–present
- Known for: Barrister Babu; Banni Chow Home Delivery; Yeh Hai Chahatein

Pravisht Mishra is an Indian television actor best known for his portrayal of Aniruddh Roy Choudhary in Barrister Babu and Yuvan Singh Rathore in Banni Chow Home Delivery.

== Personal life ==
Pravisht Mishra was born and raised in Mumbai, Maharashtra. He is a graduate in Physiotheraphy.

== Career ==
Mishra started his career as Inspector Khare's son in 2011 film Shabri. In 2013, he made his television debut with a minor role of Teenage Devadatta in Zee TV's show Buddha. In 2014, he appeared as Rajkumar Uttara in the mythological series Mahabharat. He then appeared in other mythological shows like Siya Ke Ram where he portrayed as young Bharatha and in Suryaputra Karn as young Yudhishthir.

In 2018, Mishra acted as the parallel lead Sahil Saglecha in the television show Mangalam Dangalam. From 2019 to 2020, he played the role of Dr. Pulkit Rastogi in the serial Kahaan Hum Kahaan Tum. Mishra made a breakthrough in his career by portraying the lead role of Aniruddh Roy Choudhary in Barrister Babu opposite Aurra Bhatnagar Badoni and Anchal Sahu. From 2022 to 2023, he was seen playing the lead role of Yuvan Singh Rathore in the show Banni Chow Home Delivery opposite Ulka Gupta. From 2023 to 2024, he was seen playing the lead role of Arjun Bajwa in the show Yeh Hai Chahatein opposite Shagun Sharma. Since June 2026, he is playing the lead role of Krishna Bacchan in the show Bareilly Ke Bacchan.

== Media image ==
In 2026, he was listed in 40 Under 40 by the Indian edition of Variety.

== Filmography ==
=== Films ===
Year	Title	Role	Notes	Ref.
2011	Shabri	Inspector Khare's son	Cameo	

=== Television ===
Year	Title	Role	Notes	Ref.
2013	Buddha	Teen Devadatta		
2013	Mahabharat	Young Kripacharya	Episode 1	
2014	Mahabharat	Rajkumar Uttara		
2014	CID	Hiten		
2015	Siya Ke Ram	Young Bharata		
2015	Suryaputra Karn	Young Yudhishthira		
2015	Aahat	Raghu	Season 6	
2015	Dilli Wali Thakur Gurls	Eshu's admirer	Cameo	
2016	Baalveer	Rocket Boy		
2016	Savdhaan India	Aditya		
2017	Peshwa Bajirao	Young Shivaji II		
2017	Dhhai Kilo Prem	Tushar		
2017	Aye Zindagi	Qasim	Episode 45	
2018	Kaun Hai?	Kunwar Veerpratap Singh Rathore	Episode: "The Heir of Dhawalgarh"	
2018–2019	Mangalam Dangalam	Sahil Saklecha		
2019–2020	Kahaan Hum Kahaan Tum	Dr. Pulkit Rastogi		
2020–2021	Barrister Babu	Barrister Aniruddh Roy Choudhary		
2020–2021	Barrister Babu	Advocate Batuk Roy Choudhary		
2022–2023	Banni Chow Home Delivery	Yuvan Singh Rathod / Kabir Singh Rathod		
2022	Durga Aur Charu	Barrister Aniruddh Roy Choudhary	Voiceover in Episode 1	
2023–2024	Yeh Hai Chahatein	IAS Arjun Bajwa		
2026–present	Bareilly Ke Bacchan	Krishna Bacchan		

=== Web series ===
Year	Title	Role	Notes	Ref.
2018	Apharan	Minister's son	Episode 1	
2026	Market Ka Malik	Reyansh	Lead role	

== Awards and nominations ==
Year	Award	Category	Work	Result	Ref.
2022	22nd Indian Television Academy Awards	Popular Actor - Drama	Banni Chow Home Delivery	Nominated	
2023	Indian Telly Awards	Best Actor in a Lead Role	Banni Chow Home Delivery	Won	

== See also ==
- List of Indian actors
- List of Indian television actors
