= Virgin Bhanupriya =

2020 Indian film by Ajay Lohan

- Promotional poster
- Directed by: Ajay Lohan
- Produced by: Shreyans Mahendra Dhariwal
- Starring: Urvashi Rautela
- Cinematography: Johny Lal
- Edited by: Akshay Mohan
- Music by: Sanjoy Chowdhury
- Production company: Dhariwal Films
- Distributed by: ZEE5
- Release date: 16 July 2020
- Running time: 111 minutes
- Country: India
- Language: Hindi

Virgin Bhanupriya is a 2020 Indian Hindi-language comedy drama film directed by Ajay Lohan and produced by Shreyans Mahendra Dhariwal. The film stars Urvashi Rautela in the lead role, with Gautam Gulati, Archana Puran Singh, Chaitanya Kanhai and Rumana Molla playing supporting roles. The film is a family comedy that explores relationship between youngsters and their families. The film was scheduled for theatrical release in India and received negative reviews, but has moved to release on 16 July 2020 through ZEE5 due to the COVID-19 pandemic.

== Cast ==
- Urvashi Rautela as Bhanupriya Awasthi (Bhanu)
- Gautam Gulati as Shartiya / Abhimanyu
- Archana Puran Singh as Madhu Awasthi, Bhanupriya's mother
- Rumana Molla as Rukul Singh
- Rajiv Gupta as Vijay Awasthi, Bhanupriya's father
- Brijendra Kala as Police Inspector
- Niki Aneja Walia as Moon
- Natasha Suri as Sonali
- Sumit Gulati as Rajiv
- Chaitanya Kanhai as Alex
- Pranav Verma as Jhanda
- Ashutosh Senwal as Chukiya
- Amrit Arora as Pungi
- Ayush Gupta as Computer Geek
- Delnaaz Irani as Tarot Card Reader
- Shiv Kumar as Shartiya's Father
- Dimple Chauhan as Shartiya's Mother
- Kamlesh Kumar Mishra as Pandit
- Vikas Verma as Irfan

== Release ==
Due to the COVID-19 pandemic, the film was not released theatrically and was streamed on ZEE5 worldwide on 16 July 2020.

== Soundtrack ==
Virgin Bhanupriya

Soundtrack album by Chirrantan Bhatt, Ramji Gulati, Amjad Nadeem Aamir and Saurabh-Vaibhav
- Released: 27 July 2020
- Recorded: 2019
- Genre: Feature film soundtrack
- Length: 19:10
- Language: Hindi
- Label: Zee Music Company
External audio
- Official Audio Jukebox on YouTube

The film's music was composed by Chirrantan Bhatt, Ramji Gulati, Amjad Nadeem Aamir and Saurabh-Vaibhav while lyrics written by Manoj Yadav, Kumaar, Alokik Rahi, Amjad Nadeem, Ajay Lohan and Sumit Sharma.

Track listing
No.	Title	Lyrics	Music	Singer(s)	Length
1.	"Dil Apni Haddon Se"	Manoj Yadav	Chirrantan Bhatt	Jyotica Tangri	4:09
2.	"Kangna Vilayati"	Kumaar	Ramji Gulati	Jyotica Tangri	3:00
3.	"Beat Pe Thumka"	Alokik Rahi, Amjad Nadeem	Amjad Nadeem Aamir	Jyotica Tangri	3:21
4.	"Virgin Bhanupriya - Title Track"	Ajay Lohan	Saurabh-Vaibhav	Dev Negi	2:42
5.	"Dil Apni Haddon Se" (Yasser Version)	Manoj Yadav	Chirrantan Bhatt	Yasser Desai	3:30
6.	"Kadi Hoon Karke"	Ajay Lohan, Sumit Sharma	Saurabh-Vaibhav	Sheetal Gupta	2:28
Total length:					19:10

== Critical reception ==
Pallabi Dey Purkayastha of The Times of India rated the film 2/5, calling it "another run-of-the-mill tale on sexual liberation". Devasheesh Pandey of News18 gave the film 2.5 stars out of 5, writing ″Urvashi Rautela's 'Virgin Bhanupriya' is not a disguised sex comedy and functions more as a family drama. It brings forth how the society sees sexual curiosity as something scandalous.″ Bollywood Hungama gave the film 2 stars out of 5, writing ″VIRGIN BHANUPRIYA is 1 hour 50 minutes long and starts off with the central plot without wasting any time. Some of the situations in the film are funny, on paper, but doesn't translate the same way on screen. The track of Rajiv is mediocre. Shartiya's entry is heroic and one expects the film to get better. Sadly, that doesn't really happen. The film should have been high on humour and also emotional moments and barring a joke or two, nothing really works. The climax is haphazard and even though the twist is kind of unexpected, the impact is not made.″
