= Anchal Sahu =

Indian television actress

- Born: March 18, 2005 (age 21); Mumbai, Maharashtra, India
- Occupation: Actress
- Years active: 2011–present
- Known for: Kyun Utthe Dil Chhod Aaye Barrister Babu Parineetii (TV series)

Anchal Sahu (born 18 March 2005) is an Indian television actress who is best known for her portrayal of Vashma Baig in Kyun Utthe Dil Chhod Aaye, Bondita in Barrister Babu and Parineet Kakkar in Parineetii.

== Early life ==
Anchal was born on 18 March 2005 in Mumbai. She hails from Berhampur in Odisha. She has a sister, Anjali Sahu.

== Career ==
Anchal started her acting career at the age of 6, through an advertisement. She has worked in several TV shows as a child artist.

She rose into fame playing Vashma Baig in Kyun Utthe Dil Chhod Aaye in 2021 and Bondita in Barrister Babu, replacing Aurra Bhatnagar Badoni where she was paired opposite Pravisht Mishra.In 2022, she portrayed the lead role of Parineet Kakkar Bajwa opposite Ankur Verma in Parineetii and continued playing it as elderly parent when the show took generation leap in June 2025 and she started playing second generational lead and her onscreen character's daughter Preet Bajwa opposite Paras Kalnawat.

== Filmography ==
=== Television ===
Year	Title	Role	Notes	Ref.
2009	Dill Mill Gayye		Child actor	
2011	Ek Hazaaron Mein Meri Behna Hai		Child actor	
2012	Savdhaan India		Child actor	
2014	Ek Hasina Thi	Child Sakshi	Child actor	
2015	Begusarai		Child actor	
2015	Lajwanti		Child actor	
2017	Meri Durga	Arti's friend	Child actor	
2018	Shaktipeeth Ke Bhairav	Manjari	Episodes 60 and 61	
2019	Laal Ishq	Christie	Episode 176	
2021	Kyun Utthe Dil Chhod Aaye	Vashma Baig/Noor Mahal	Adult actor	
2021	Barrister Babu	Barrister Bondita Das Roy Choudhary	Adult actor	
2022–2025	Parineetii	Parineet "Pari" Kakkar Bajwa alias Parvati Singhania Bajwa	Adult actor	
2025	Parineetii	Preet Bajwa	Adult actor	
2026	Mera Sindoor			

=== Special appearances ===
Year	Title	Role	Notes	Ref.
2022	Durga Aur Charu	Barrister Bondita Das Roy Choudhary	Episode 1: "Voiceover of Bondita"	
2022	Saavi Ki Savaari	Parineet Kakkar Bajwa	Episode: "Saavi and Nityam's Sangeet"	
2022	Dance Deewane Juniors	Herself	Grand finale	
2022; 2023	Pyar Ke Saat Vachan Dharampatnii	Parineet Kakkar Bajwa	Mahasangam crossovers	
2024	Suhaagan: Ke Rang Jashn Ke Rang	Parineet Kakkar Bajwa	Holi celebration	
2024	Mangal Lakshmi	Parineet Kakkar Bajwa	Lakshmi's wedding	
2024	Megha Barsenge	Parineet Kakkar Bajwa	Mahasangam crossovers	

=== Films ===
Year	Title	Role	Ref.
2019	Mardaani 2	Brij's daughter	

=== Web series ===
Year	Title	Role	Ref.
2020	Girlfriend Chor	Pihu	

== See also ==
- List of Hindi television actresses
- List of Indian television actresses
