= Zee Next =

Indian Hindi-language television channel

- Country: India
- Headquarters: Mumbai, India

Ownership
- Owner: Zee Entertainment Enterprises
- Sister channels: Zee TV; Zee Cinema; Zee News

History
- Launched: 11 December 2007; 18 years ago
- Closed: 4 September 2008; 17 years ago

Links
- Website: http://zeenext.com/index.html (closed)

Zee Next was a Hindi general entertainment channel established by Zee Entertainment Enterprises which is based in India. The channel was shut down in 4 September 2008 due to low ratings and lack of investors.

== Programming ==
- Ek Thi Rajkumari
- Jhoome Jiiya Re
- Pyaar Ishq Mohabbat
- Rock The Dhunn
- Rock-N-Roll Family
- Simply Sapney
- Yahaan Ke Hum Sikander
- Zinda Dil
- Kohi Apna Sa
- The Fresh Prince of Bel-Air
- Diff'rent Strokes
- Sa Re Ga Ma Pa L'il Champs
- Shabaash India
- Arrested By Rakhi
