= Rachi Sharma =

Indian actress

- Born: Indore, Madhya Pradesh, India
- Occupation: Actress
- Years active: 2022–present
- Known for: Durga Aur Charu; Kumkum Bhagya

Rachi Sharma is an Indian actress who primarily works in Hindi television. Sharma is best known for her portrayal of Durga Roy Chowdhury in Durga Aur Charu and Poorvi Kohli Malhotra in Kumkum Bhagya.

== Career ==
Sharma made her acting debut in 2022 with Woh Toh Hai Albelaa, where she played Rashmi Sharma opposite Kinshuk Vaidya. From 2022 to 2023, she played a lawyer, Durga Roy Chowdhury, opposite Kunal Jaisingh in Durga Aur Charu.

Sharama's breakthrough came with Kumkum Bhagya, where she played Poorvi Kohli Malhotra opposite Abrar Qazi, from November 2023 to February 2025. From June 2025 to September 2025, she played Meera Ghosh in Aami Dakini opposite Hitesh Bharadwaj. Since March 2026, she played Aadhya Singh Chauhan opposite Vikram Singh Chauhan in Colors TV's Do Duniya Ek Dil.

== Filmography ==
=== Television ===
Year	Title	Role	Notes	Ref.
2022	Woh Toh Hai Albelaa	Rashmi "Rashu" Sharma	Negative Role	
2022–2023	Durga Aur Charu	Barrister Durga Roy Chowdhury	Lead Role	
2023–2025	Kumkum Bhagya	Poorvi Kohli Malhotra	Female Lead (Season 3)	
2025	Aami Dakini	Meera Ghosh	Lead Role	
2026	Do Duniya Ek Dil	Aadhya Shingh Chauhan / Aadhya Shivaay Pandey	Lead Role	

== See also ==
- List of Hindi television actresses
- List of Indian television actresses
