= Danish Zehen =

Indian social media personality (1996–2018)

- Born: Danish Gafoor Mulla; 16 March 1996; Kurla, Maharashtra, India
- Died: 20 December 2018 (aged 22); Sion Panvel Highway, Maharashtra, India
- Burial place: Kasaiwada Kabristan, Kurla, India
- Occupations: Social media personality; rapper; YouTuber
- Television: Ace of Space 1

YouTube information
- Channel: Danish Zehen
- Years active: 2015–2018
- Genre: Vlog
- Subscribers: 6.2 million
- Views: 404.8 million
- Last updated: 9 September 2026

Danish Gafoor Mulla (16 March 1996 - 20 December 2018), better known as Danish Zehen, was an Indian social media influencer, rapper, and YouTube personality who is primarily known for his participation in the reality show MTV Ace of Space Season 1.

== Early life and education ==
Zehen was born on 16 March 1996 in Kurla, Maharashtra, India. He did his schooling from Kedarnath Vidya Prasarini's English High School in Kurla. He then completed his higher studies in engineering at M. H. Saboo Siddik College of Engineering in Nagpada.

== Career ==
Zehen began his career in music by sharing his rap compositions on his YouTube channel, launched in October 2012. He performed at various events as a rapper and hip-hop dancer. Zehen gained experience in the fashion industry by modelling for various prominent designers. He also worked as a lifestyle vlogger and shared his video blogs on his personal YouTube channel. Additionally, he had a separate YouTube channel focused on fitness videos.

Zehen was a contestant on the first season of Indian reality competition television series, MTV Ace of Space. The show was hosted by Vikas Gupta. He walked out of the show on Day 43 due to an emergency.

== Death ==
Zehen died on 20 December 2018. While returning from a wedding, he met with a car accident on Sion-Panvel Highway around 12:30 AM in Vashi, Mumbai where he lost control of his vehicle and rammed into an electric pole after hitting a stone lying on the highway. He was immediately taken to the MGM Hospital where he was declared dead.

Police stated that "The speed of vehicle was over 70+ kmph at the time of the mishap. Danish was not drunk at the time of the incident." and registered a case against Zehen under section 304A (causing death by negligence), 279 (rash driving) and 337 (causing hurt by act endangering life or personal safety of others) of the Indian Penal Code.

Thousands of individuals attended Zehen's funeral to pay their respects. He buried at Kasaiwada Kabristan, Kurla. Additionally, there was a notable increase in the number of followers on his social media accounts.
