= Bigg Boss OTT (Hindi season 1) =

Indian reality show (2021)

- Season 1
- Eye logo of Bigg Boss OTT 1
- Presented by: Karan Johar
- No. of days: 42
- No. of housemates: 13
- Winner: Divya Agarwal
- Runner-up: Nishant Bhat
- No. of episodes: 43

Release
- Original network: Voot
- Original release: 8 August – 18 September 2021

Season chronology
- ← Previous; Season 0 Next → Season 2

Bigg Boss OTT 1, also known as Bigg Boss: Over-the-Top Season 1, was the first season of the Indian reality digital series Bigg Boss OTT which itself is the spin-off version of Bigg Boss. It premiered on 8 August 2021 on Voot with Karan Johar as the host for the OTT version. The Grand Finale of the show took place on 18 September 2021 where Divya Agarwal emerged as the winner and Nishant Bhat emerged as the runner-up.

== Production ==
=== Teaser ===
On 24 July 2021, Voot unveiled a poster with Karan Johar as the host of this digital exclusive season. On 3 August, Voot unveiled a third promo with Karan Johar revealing the format of the season being much more bolder and crazier ever in the history.

=== Broadcast ===
Apart from the usual hour-long episode, viewers will also have access to the direct 24x7 camera footage. The show will be streamed every day. The episodes will be first telecasted through 24 hour live channel on paid subscription of Voot Select, then it will be shown for free next morning on Voot. The episodes also started to telecast on Colors TV late night but it later stopped telecasting on television.

=== House ===
The house this year is made with the theme "Stay Connected". The house consists of a Patio, Living Room, Kitchen, Bathroom, Bedroom, Garden Area, Confession Room, Dining Table, Swimming Pool and specially for the theme, they added a special room called "Stay Connected Room". The bedroom contains bunk beds this year and the house seems to be carnival-type designed one.

== Concept ==
Theme
This season was a first-time ever in the history of Bigg Boss, that launched 6 weeks before the television version on an OTT platform Voot. The season's theme was "Stay Connected" and 6 boys and 6 girls entered as pairs while 1 girl entered alone. The contestants had to work on making the bond with their connection stronger and survive in the game. On Day 29, Bigg Boss announced that all connections are now broken and all the housemates will play as individuals.

Features
The makers have also launched many new features that will give powers to the audience such as Live Nominations, Punishments and Daily Report Card.

Ticket to Bigg Boss 15
All five finalists were offered Ticket to Bigg Boss 15 but the condition was that they would be out from finale race. Pratik Sehajpal chose the offer and he officially became the first contestant of Bigg Boss 15. As per the show's concept, finalists Shamita Shetty, Nishant Bhat and Pratik Sehajpal were qualified to participate in Bigg Boss 15. Later Raqesh Bapat and Neha Bhasin entered the Bigg Boss 15 as wildcard contestants but they couldn't survive for very long. Later, Shetty, Bhat and Sehajpal made it into finale week of Bigg Boss 15 by living in for 17 weeks and ended up becoming as 3rd, 4th, 1st Runner-ups respectively.

== Housemate status ==
Sr	Housemate	Day entered	Day exited	Result
1	Divya	Day 1	Day 42	Winner
2	Nishant	Day 1	Day 42	1st runner-up
3	Shamita	Day 1	Day 42	2nd runner-up
4	Raqesh	Day 1	Day 42	3rd runner-up
5	Pratik	Day 1	Day 42	Walked, 4th runner-up
6	Neha	Day 1	Day 39	Evicted
7	Muskan	Day 1	Day 36	Evicted by Housemates
8	Akshara	Day 1	Day 29	Evicted
9	Milind	Day 1	Day 29	Evicted
10	Zeeshan	Day 1	Day 18	Ejected
11	Ridhima	Day 1	Day 15	Evicted
12	Karan	Day 1	Day 15	Evicted
13	Urfi	Day 1	Day 8	Evicted

== Housemates ==
The participants in the order of appearance and entered in stage are:

=== Original entrants ===
- Raqesh Bapat - Television and film actor. He is known for acting in films like Tum Bin, Dil Vil Pyar Vyar and Heroine. He has also worked in Popular television shows like Maryada: Lekin Kab Tak? and Qubool Hai.
- Zeeshan Khan - Television actor and content creator. He is known for acting in Kumkum Bhagya. He got famous after the video where he tried boarding his flight in a bathrobe uploaded on his YouTube Channel went viral.
- Millind Gaba - Singer. He is known for his songs Nazar Lag Jayegi, She Don't Know and Yaar Mod Do.
- Nishant Bhat - Choreographer. He has been a part of dance reality shows like Super Dancer, Jhalak Dikhhla Jaa and Dance Deewane.
- Karan Nath - Film actor. He is known for acting in the film Yeh Dil Aashiqanaa.
- Pratik Sehajpal - Reality television star and model. He has participated in reality shows like MTV Love School and Ace of Space 1.
- Shamita Shetty - Film actress. She made her film debut with Mohabbatein. She also participated in Bigg Boss 3 and Fear Factor: Khatron Ke Khiladi 9.
- Urfi Javed - Television actress and content creator. She is known for acting in Kasautii Zindagii Kay, Yeh Rishta Kya Kehlata Hai and Bepannah.
- Neha Bhasin - Singer. She is known for her song Dhunki, Jag ghoomeya and Bajre da sitta.
- Muskan Jattana - Social activist. She makes videos on women's rights and other social issues.
- Akshara Singh - Bhojpuri film and Hindi television actress. She is known for acting in Service Wali Bahu.
- Divya Agarwal - Actress, reality tv star and model. She is the winner of Ace of Space 1 and Runner-up of MTV Splitsvilla 10.
- Ridhima Pandit - Television actress. She is known for her role in Bahu Hamari Rajni Kant. She also participated in Fear Factor: Khatron Ke Khiladi 9.

=== Guest entrants ===
- Nia Sharma - Television actress. She is known for her roles as Manvi Chaudhary in Ek Hazaaron Mein Meri Behna Hai, Jamai Raja as Roshni Patel. She stayed in the house for 1 day.

== Twists ==
=== Connections ===
Before entering the House, the housemates had to pair up with one co-contestant as connection. Divya Agarwal entered the House without any connection which resulted in Divya being nominated. On Day 30, all the pairs were broken.

Housemates	Week 1		Week 2		Week 3		Week 4	Weeks 5-6
Housemates	Day 1	Day 4	Day 8	Day 15	Day 16	Day 18	Day 29	Day 30-42
Housemates	^{[1]}		None		^{[2]}	^{[3]}	None	^{[4]}
Divya	No connection	Paired with Zeeshan				No connection		#StayConnected theme ended
Nishant	Paired with Muskan							#StayConnected theme ended
Shamita	Paired with Raqesh							#StayConnected theme ended
Raqesh	Paired with Shamita							#StayConnected theme ended
Pratik	Paired with Akshara				Paired with Neha			#StayConnected theme ended
Neha	Paired with Millind				Paired with Pratik			#StayConnected theme ended
Muskan	Paired with Nishant							#StayConnected theme ended
Akshara	Paired with Pratik				Paired with Milind			
Millind	Paired with Neha				Paired with Akshara			
Zeeshan	Paired with Urfi	Paired with Divya						
Ridhima	Paired with Karan							
Karan	Paired with Ridhima							
Urfi	Paired with Zeeshan	No connection						

Notes

- Divya Agarwal was directly nominated on the Premiere Night as there was no connection left for her.
  On Day 4, there was an opportunity given to the boys where any one boy could press the buzzer within 2 hours and make Divya his connection. Zeeshan Khan pressed the buzzer and now his connection is Divya Agarwal while Urfi Javed was nominated as no connections were left for her.
- On Day 16, the housemates were given a chance to change their connections in the Game Of Hearts task. Pratik-Neha and Milind-Akshara became the new connections.
- On Day 18, Zeeshan was ejected from the house after getting in a physical fight with Pratik..
- On Day 30, Bigg Boss announced that all contestants will play as individuals.

== Weekly summary ==
Week 1	Entrances	On Grand Premiere, Urfi, Shamita, Riddhima, Karan, Pratik, Nishant, Muskaan(Moose), Divya, Zeeshan, Akshara, Millind, Raqesh, Neha entered the house
Week 1	Twist	The theme of the season is #StayConnected so there were 6 pairs and 1 single. The 6 pairs were Raqesh-Shamita, Zeeshan-Urfi, Neha-Millind, Muskan-Nishant, Akshara-Pratik and Ridhima-Karan. Divya was a single as nobody chose her; On the Premiere Night, Bigg Boss announced that the girls will have to win tasks in order to get their luggage.; On Day 4, Bigg Boss announced that boys have an opportunity to break off their existing connection and make a connection with Divya. The girl whose connection breaks will be nominated in her place.
Week 1	Nominations	On Grand Premiere, Divya was nominated as she was a single.; On Day 4, Zeeshan broke off his connection with Urfi and made connection with Divya. So Urfi was nominated and Divya was immuned; There will be a Nomination Task, one partner will sit in the room and the other partner will be performing. They will be given tasks to win. Pratik & Akshara are safe from the nomination as they are captains and they will supervise the task. In the end, four connections will be safe and one will be nominated. Urfi won't be a part of the task as she is already nominated. At the end, Shamita-Raqesh were nominated; Voot Select Members nominated Muskan-Nishant for eviction; On Day 7, An Immunity task was announced where nominated members have to entertain the 24/7 Live Audience. Muskan-Nishant was immuned and Urfi, Shamita and Raqesh were nominated for eviction.
Week 1	Tasks	BB Candy Shop:The girls have a chance to win their luggage. Their connections will play on girls behalf. All guys will pick their connection's dolls and take them to the candy shop. There are 5 gates to enter the candy shop and there will be 5 buzzers, The candy shop will open when the buzzer plays. Each boy will enter one gate. Divya will supervise the task. After every round, Divya will seal one gate. The final round winner's connection will get all their luggage; Connection No. 1: Indian Matchmaker Sima Taparia enters the house to motivate the connections and to choose the No. 1 connection.; 1 2 3 Statue: All 6 connections were divided into 2 teams, Team A (Raqesh & Shamita, Milind & Neha, Zeeshan & Divya) and Team B (Akshara & Pratik, Nishant & Muskaan, Ridhima & Karan). One team is supposed to maintain a statue-like pose for an extended amount of time, whereas the other team will try to disturb them. .The Boss Lady & Man will be chosen from winning team. Urfi is the supervisor of the task.
Week 1	Results	Winner (BB Candy Shop) – Nishant
Week 1	Results	Failed (BB Candy Shop) – Rest of the Male contestants
Week 1	Results	Winner (Connection No.1) – Akshara-Pratik
Week 1	Results	Failed (Connection No.1) – Rest of the connections
Week 1	Results	Winner (1 2 3 Statue) – Raqesh-Shamita, Neha-Milind, Divya-Zeeshan
Week 1	Results	Failed (1 2 3 Statue) – Akshara-Pratik, Nishant-Muskan, Ridhima-Karan
Week 1	Boss Man & Boss Lady	Pratik Sehajpal & Akshara Singh
Week 1	Notes	After considering the performance of the housemates, Bigg Boss Announced that all girls can take 25 items from their luggage.; The winning team of 1 2 3 Statue task got the chance to decide the next Boss Lady & Man among them. They chose Shamita-Raqesh
Week 1	Report Card	On Day 2, Bigg Boss Announced that there will be a daily report card which will show the performance of the housemates . The housemates' performance will be decided by Voot Select 24x7 Live Audience. If the performance of housemates is good they can get extra privileges or no problems for the next day. If the performance of housemates was bad, Bigg Boss can take away some privileges.: Day 2: Audience were happy with the performance of the housemates.; Day 3: Audience were happy with the performance of the housemates. As a result, the girls got all their luggage back.; Day 4: Audience were happy with the performance of the housemates.; Day 5: Audience were happy with the performance of the housemates.; Day 6: Audience were happy with the performance of the housemates.; Day 7: Audience were happy with the performance of the housemates.
Week 1	Exits	On Day 8, Urfi Javed was evicted by Public Vote
Week 2	Nominations	Nomination Task: In this Task, Boss Lady & Man Shamita & Raqesh will be the head sarpanch and immuned. Every round Bigg Boss declares one connection to be the sarpanch along with them. He also declares a title which must be given to one of the remaining connections. After discussing with all the connections, the four sarpanchs must declare the name of the connection who they think is the must suitable for that title. Then the 24x7 Live Voot Select Audience will decide if they agree with their decision or not. If the audience agrees, then the connection who got that title will be nominated and if they don't, then the connection who was the sarpanch for that round will be nominated.; Round / Sarpanch / Topic / Sarpanch Decision / Audience Decision / Nominations; Round 1 / Divya and Zeeshan / Sabse Kaamchor (lazy) / Muskan & Nishant / Disagreed / Divya and Zeeshan; Round 2 / Ridhima and Karan / Sabse Aswachh (unhygienic) / Muskan & Nishant / Disagreed / Ridhima and Karan; Round 3 / Muskan and Nishant / Sabse Kamzor (weakest) / Couldn't decide; Bigg Boss cancelled the task and nominated everyone as a punishment, including Shamita & Raqesh by making their immunity invalid.
Week 2	Task	BB Factory:All connections will work as factory workers. They have to make dominos using blocks and paint. They will paint the initials of the connection which they don't want to make the next Boss Lady & Man. After each round, the connections will keep getting eliminated on the basis of how many connections wrote their initials. In the end and the last connection will become Boss Lady & Man. Shamita & Raqesh will be the supervisors and they will decide which connection's name was written the most on the blocks.
Week 2	Punishments	Bigg Boss nominated everyone as they couldn't reach to a decision in the task; On Day 14, Bigg Boss asked the housemates to choose 2 connections who deserve punishment based on their journey so far by mutual agreement. They choose Akshara & Pratik and Shamita & Raqesh. These 2 connections must continuously rotate a mill until Bigg Boss next update.
Week 2	Results	Winner (BB Factory) – Divya-Zeeshan
Week 2	Results	Failed (BB Factory) – Neha-Millind, Muskan-Nishant, Akshara-Pratik, Ridhima-Karan
Week 2	Boss Man & Boss Lady	Raqesh Bapat & Shamita Shetty
Week 2	Report Card	Day 9: Audience were happy with the performance of the housemates.; Day 10: Audience were happy with the performance of the housemates.; Day 11: Audience were not that happy with the performance of the housemates. As a result, the next day they will have a gas supply for 4 hours only. 2 hours in the morning, 2 hours in the evening.; Day 12: Audience were not that happy with the performance of the housemates. As a result, the next day they will have a gas supply for 4 hours only. 2 hours in the morning, 2 hours in the evening.; Day 13: Audience were happy with the performance of the housemates.; Day 14: Audience were happy with the performance of the housemates.
Week 2	Exits	On Day 15, Karan Nath and Ridhima Pandit was evicted by Public Vote.
Week 3	Nominations	There will be a card slot and an empty card in the confession room. One connection will go to the room and has to write the name of another connection who they want to save. The next connection to go to the room can either agree with the name written or tear the card. At the end of the task, the connection whose name is left on the task will be saved from nomination. If the card is empty, everyone will be nominated. Divya & Zeeshan are already safe as they are the Boss Lady & Man.; 1. Divya & Zeeshan: Write Muskaan & Nishant's name; 2. Shamita & Raqesh: Tear the card; 3. Neha & Pratik: Write Muskaan & Nishant's name; 4. Akshara & Milind: Approve the card; 5. Muskaan & Nishant: Approve the card; At the end, Shamita-Raqesh, Akshara-Pratik and Neha-Millind were nominated Bigg Boss announced that Voot Select Audience have the power to save 1 connection, They saved Shamita-Raqesh and Akshara, Milind, Pratik and Neha was nominated
Week 3	Tasks	Game Of Hearts:* Game Of Hearts (Day 16): Before the task, Bigg Boss dissolved all the connections and gave boys the opportunity to change their connections. The girls present their heart to a guy they want to form a connection with. The guy in question could either accept the heart or break it and toss it in the dustbin. The task won't end utill everyone has a connection.; Shamita : Gave the heart to Raqesh; Raqesh : Accepted; Muskaan : Gave the heart to Nishant; Nishant : Accepted; Akshara : Gave the heart to Pratik; Pratik : Accepted; Neha : Didn't give the heart to anyone; Pratik : Broke the heart given by Akshara; Divya : Gave the heart to Zeeshan; Zeeshan : Accepted; Akshara : Gave the heart to Pratik; Pratik : Broke the heart given by Akshara; Neha : Gave the heart to Pratik; Pratik : Accepted; Akshara : Gave the heart to Milind; Milind : Accepted; The Connections were Shamita & Raqesh, Muskaan & Nishant, Divya & Zeeshan, Neha & Pratik, Akshara & Milind.: Red Flags:Zeeshan and Divya will give their rules and red flags to people if they think some rules are broken. They can give it on behavior as well. There is a whiteboard. Zeeshan and Divya can write new rules there. Everyone claps. Divya says they can give the red flag to someone who breaks those rules. They have to give all the flags. The contestant will keep flags in the bag behind them. If you play well you can become contenders.; 'Wild Wolf:Voot Select Viewers chose Akshara-Milind, Neha-Pratik as captaincy contenders There are two platforms in the garden. Make pyramids from the bricks there and protect them from being broken. The connection with the higher pyramid will win the task. The entire inmate will hear wolf sounds. Pratik, Neha and Akshara Milint will stop. Any two contestants will come in the garden and break one of the towers. After that, the two connections can start over again.; Luxury Budget Task:Connections have a chance to win a luxury budget. All boys have to make their connections feel special. Divya will be the captain of this task and choose the winner in which the guy has pampered his connection the best. You will get a good hamper. Your first task will start. The guys have to style their connections. In the second part, they will cook for them. The girls can suggest them but not help.. The third task is that all connections would go to the garden and they will present it to their girls. Divya will choose who was the best connection. They will be the winners.
Week 3	Results	Red Flags Task was cancelled by Bigg Boss due to Physical violence
Week 3	Results	Winner (Wild Wolf) – Neha-Pratik
Week 3	Results	Failed (Wild Wolf) – Akshara-Milind
Week 3	Results	Winner (Luxury Budget Task) – Nishant-Muskan
Week 3	Results	Failed (Luxury Budget Task) – Rest of the connections
Week 3	Boss Man & Boss Lady	Zeeshan Khan & Divya Agarwal
Week 3	Report Card	Day 16: Audience were happy with the performance of the housemates.; Day 17: Audience were happy with the performance of the housemates.; Day 18: Audience were not that happy with the performance of the housemates. As a result, the next day they will have a gas supply for 2 hours in the morning and The gym area will be closed for the next day; Day 19: Audience were happy with the performance of the housemates.; Day 20: Audience were happy with the performance of the housemates.; Day 21: Audience were not at all happy with the performance of the housemates. It was announced on Monday that None of you will use the gym and gas supply will be open for two hours only.
Week 3	Punishments	Bigg Boss asked Pratik-Neha to name 2 connections/ 1 connection+ Divya who would get the punishment. AS they couldn't decide. Everyone except Pratik-Neha got punished and were asked to push the see saw
Week 3	Exits	On Day 18, Zeeshan Khan was ejected due to physical violence; On Day 22, No eviction took place
Week 4	Nominations	Divya is nominated as she does not have any connection, Neha and Pratik are Boss Man and Boss Lady so they are safe, All contestants have received letters from their home. Bigg Boss tells them that they have to mutually decide which one of you will sacrifice and let the other one read and nominate themselves.: Nishant and Moose: Nishant tore his letter and was nominated; Milind and Akshara:Both are nominated; Shamita and Raqesh: Shamita is nominated; At the end, Nishant, Shamita, Akshara, Milind and Divya was nominated Neha and Pratik were asked to save 1 person. They saved Shamita. Voot Select Viewers were asked to save one person from Nominations, They saved Nishant.
Week 4	Tasks	Clock Task: There is a clock outside but it doesn't have wings. The inmates will be the wings of it. The connections who are part of it are Raqesh Shamita, Pratik Neha, Nishant Moose and Akshara Milind. You have to count 3 5minutes in this clock. You will move after that and the one who has the closest to 35 minutes will win and become the first contender to the next Bossman and lady.; Results: Neha and Pratik took 45 minutes and 38 seconds. Raqesh and Shamita 36 minutes. Milind and Akshara, 35 minutes 26 seconds. The connection that was closest was Nishant and Moose. Their time was 34 minutes and 35 seconds; Nia Ka Raaj: Nia Sharma entered the house as a guest, The two winners will become two more contenders. Nia is boss lady of the house. You have to win her heart. If she's happy with someone she will give them gold coin. The 2 connections who get maximum gold coins will be the next 2 contenders. Divya cant take part in the task as she is single; Captaincy Task:The three contestant couples have to play a ladder game. There are three ladders in the garden. There are no steps in them. Three connections would pick the steps from the slide and try to make their ladder. In the end the one with most number of ladders will win the task. The connections who couldn't get letters from their houses during nomination, this is another chance to get those letter. there will be 7 rounds. Bigg boss will send one letter with each round. After the buzzer, the connection who gets the step will decide if they want to tear the letter and put it on their ladder or would they give the letter to the owner and throw it in the bin. Nishant and Moose got an advantage yesterday so they already have a step. Raqesh and Shamita will be the referees of this game.
Week 4	Boss Man & Boss Lady	Pratik Sehajpal & Neha Bhasin
Week 4	Results	Winner (Clock Task) – Muskan-Nishant
Week 4	Results	Failed (Clock Task) – Rest of the Connections
Week 4	Results	Winner (Nia Ka Raaj) – Neha-Pratik, Akshara-Milind
Week 4	Results	Failed (Nia Ka Raaj) – Raqesh-Shamita
Week 4	Results	Captaincy Task was cancelled by Bigg Boss as the result was draw
Week 4	Report Card	Day 23: Audience were happy with the performance of the housemates.; Day 24: Audience were happy with the performance of the housemates.; Day 25: Audience were happy with the performance of the housemates.; Day 26: Audience were happy with the performance of the housemates.; Day 27: Audience were happy with the performance of the housemates.; Day 28: Audience were happy with the performance of the housemates.
Week 4	Exits	On Day 29, Akshara Singh and Milind Gaba were evicted by Public Vote
Week 5	Nominations	Bigg Boss asked all housemates one by one to name 2 housemates who will be nominated. At the end, Shamita, Divya, Neha, Pratik and Muskan were nominated
Week 5	Twists	Bigg Boss announced that all contestants will play solo for the last 2 weeks and all connections were broken
Week 5	Tasks	Immunity Task:ll nominated contestants have a chance to save themselves. There's an autorickshaw in the garden. The three who will stay in it will be safe. In this task, the rickshaw's horn would blare. Once it blares, they will pick one person out and send in a danger zone. That person will send any of the two remaining nominated people to the auto. It will repeat 5 times. The ones who are left in the danger zone will stay nominated. Since Pratik and Neha have the disadvantage. Shamita, Moose and Divya will start with auto, and Pratik and Neha have to sit in the danger zone.; Ticket to Finale:If you win the task today, the winner can make place in the finale. Today will be three rounds, tomorrow would be semi-finale and finale. We will choose two people. They will fight against each other in the garden area. You have to pick and walk with a water filled vessel. You have to protect it. If the water get lower than the yellow line, you will lose and be out. Rest of the inmates can try to keep filling vessels of the person they want to win from the tanks. If the two players keep walking on the track, then the one who has tank filled til yellow will be out. Advantage, the audience has given advantage to one person through a poll. That person is Divya. She qualifies directly for the semi-finale which would happen tomorrow.; Luxury Budget Task:Team A has Pratik, Nishant, and Moose. Team B is Raqesh. Shamita and Divya. Neha is the captain. Both teams have to get the bones outside in the box. The team that wins most rounds will get a luxury hamper. When buzzer blares Neha will say a word from the board. The people who have those numbers will come forward and try to get the bones. Until they cross the line the other team can try to get the bones. The winning team and captain will share the task.
Week 5	Results	Immunity Task and Ticket To Finale was cancelled by Bigg Boss due to Physical violence
Week 5	Results	Winner (Luxury Budget Task) – Shamita, Divya, Raqesh
Week 5	Results	Failed (Luxury Budget Task) – Nishant, Muskan, Pratik
Week 5	Report Card	Day 30: Audience were happy with the performance of the housemates.; Day 31: Audience were happy with the performance of the housemates.; Day 32: Audience were happy with the performance of the housemates.; Day 33: Audience were happy with the performance of the housemates.; Day 34: Audience were happy with the performance of the housemates.; Day 35: Audience were happy with the performance of the housemates.
Week 5	Exits	On Day 29, Muskan Jattana was evicted by Housemates Vote.
Week 6 Finale Week	Nominations	Divya, Pratik, Shamita, Raqesh, Neha, Nishant were nominated for the final eviction; After Neha was evicted, All the finalists were nominated and One of them would be Winner
Week 6 Finale Week	Exits	Neha Bhasin was evicted by Public Vote
Week 6 Finale Week	Happenings	On Day 37, Family members and friends of contestants came and met them; On Day 38, Media entered the house for a press conference with the contestants; On Day 39, Debates between the contestants took place and The Final eviction of the house took place; On Day 40, Memory Task took place where Finalists will take one memory with them and destroy one memory; On Day 41, Bharti Singh and Haarsh Limbachiyaa entered the house for a fun segment
Week 6 Finale Week	Report Card	Day 37: Audience were happy with the performance of the housemates.; Day 38: Audience were happy with the performance of the housemates.; Day 39: Audience were happy with the performance of the housemates.; Day 40: Audience were happy with the performance of the housemates.; Day 41: Audience were happy with the performance of the housemates.
Week 6 Finale Week	Twists	On the Grand Finale, Karan put a briefcase in front of the five finalists and those who take the briefcase will be out from the Winner's Race but will be a part of Bigg Boss 15 as a contestant. Pratik took the briefcase and became a part of Bigg Boss 15.
Day 42; Grand Finale
Walked, 4th Runner Up		Pratik Sehajpal
3rd Runner Up		Raqesh Bapat
2nd Runner Up		Shamita Shetty
1st Runner Up		Nishant Bhat
Winner		Divya Agarwal

== Nominations table ==
	Week 1		Week 2	Week 3	Week 4		Week 5		Week 6		
	Day 1	Day 4	Week 2	Week 3	Day 23	Day 24	Day 30	Day 36	Day 39	Day 42	
Nominees for Captaincy	Akshara & Pratik; Shamita & Raqesh		Divya & Zeeshan; Neha & Millind; Shamita & Raqesh	Akshara & Pratik; Divya & Zeeshan; Neha & Millind; Muskan & Nishant; Shamita & Raqesh	Akshara & Pratik; Neha & Millind		Muskan & Nishant; Neha & Pratik; Akshara & Millind		No Boss Lady & Boss Man		
Boss Lady & Boss Man	Akshara & Pratik		Shamita & Raqesh	Divya & ~~Zeeshan~~	Neha & Pratik		No Boss Lady & Boss Man		No Boss Lady & Boss Man		
Captain's Nominations	Not eligible		Not eligible	Boss Man ejected	Not eligible	Shamita (to save)	No Boss Lady & Boss Man		No Boss Lady & Boss Man		
Vote to:	Task		None	Task	Save / Evict	Save	Evict	Save	None	WIN	
Divya	Nominated	Safe	Nominated	Boss; Lady	Nominated		Neha; Pratik	Muskan	No; Nominations	No; Nominations	Winner (Day 42)
Nishant	Nominated by Live Audience	Saved by Live Audience	Nominated	Safe	Nishant (to evict); Muskan (to save)	Saved by Live Audience	Shamita; Neha	Muskan	No; Nominations	No; Nominations	1st runner-up (Day 42)
Shamita	Nominated	Not eligible	Boss; Lady	Saved by Live Audience	Shamita (to evict); Raqesh (to save)	Safe	Divya; Muskan	Neha	No; Nominations	No; Nominations	2nd runner-up (Day 42)
Raqesh	Nominated	Not eligible	Boss; Man	Saved by Live Audience	Shamita (to evict); Raqesh (to save)	Safe	Pratik; Muskan	Neha	No; Nominations	No; Nominations	3rd runner-up (Day 42)
Pratik	Boss; Man		Nominated	Nominated	Boss; Man		Divya; Raqesh	Neha	No; Nominations	No; Nominations	Walked, 4th runner-up (Day 42)
Neha	Safe	Not eligible	Nominated	Nominated	Boss; Lady		Divya; Muskan	BTM 2	No; Nominations	Evicted (Day 39)	
Muskan	Nominated by Live Audience	Saved by Live Audience	Nominated	Safe	Nishant (to evict); Muskan (to save)	Safe	Neha; Shamita	BTM 2	Evicted by Housemates (Day 36)		
Akshara	Boss; Lady		Nominated	Nominated	Akshara; Milind (to evict)	Nominated	Evicted (Day 29)				
Milind	Safe	Not eligible	Nominated	Nominated	Akshara; Milind (to evict)	Nominated	Evicted (Day 29)				
Zeeshan	Safe	Not eligible	Nominated	~~Boss~~; ~~Man~~	Ejected (Day 18)						
Ridhima	Safe	Not eligible	Nominated	Evicted (Day 15)							
Karan	Safe	Not eligible	Nominated	Evicted (Day 15)							
Urfi	Safe	Nominated	Evicted (Day 8)								
Notes	1	None	2,3	None						4,5	
Against Public Vote	~~Divya~~; ~~Muskan & Nishant~~; Shamita & Raqesh; Urfi		Akshara & Pratik; Divya & Zeeshan; Ridhima & Karan; Neha & Millind; Muskan & Nishant; Shamita & Raqesh	Akshara & Pratik; Neha & Millind; ~~Shamita & Raqesh~~	Akshara & Millind; Divya; ~~Nishant~~; ~~Shamita~~		Divya; Muskan; Neha; Pratik; Shamita	Muskan; Neha	Divya; Neha; Nishant; Pratik; Raqesh; Shamita	Divya; Nishant; Pratik; Raqesh; Shamita	
Ejected	None			Zeeshan	None						
Evicted	Urfi		Karan Ridhima	No; Eviction	Akshara Millind		Muskan		Neha	Pratik	Raqesh
Evicted	Urfi		Karan Ridhima	No; Eviction	Akshara Millind		Muskan		Neha	Shamita	
Evicted	Urfi		Karan Ridhima	No; Eviction	Akshara Millind		Muskan		Neha	Nishant	Divya

Color Keys

indicates the Boss Lady and Boss Man.
indicates that the Housemate was safe prior to nominations.
indicates that the Housemate was nominated for eviction.
indicates that the Housemate has been evicted.
indicates that the Housemate has been ejected.

Nomination notes

- ^1: Divya was directly nominated on premiere night as there were no connections left but was saved on Day 4 when Zeeshan broke his connection with Urfi and chose Divya as his connection during the Buzzer Task.
- ^2: Muskan and Nishant saved themselves from Nomination in Week 1 on a condition that they would be nominated for Week 2. They later won the Immunity Task on Day 7 and this condition no longer applied.
- ^3: Bigg Boss nominated everyone including the Boss Lady and Man as punishment when the housemates couldn't reach a decision during the Nomination Task.
- ^4: Pratik Sehajpal chose direct entry to Bigg Boss 15.
- ^5: Nishant Bhat and Shamita Shetty will participate in Bigg Boss 15.

== Guest appearances ==
Week	Day	Guest(s)	Purpose of visit
1	Premiere Night	Arjun Bijlani and Karan Wahi	For introducing Nishant Bhat
1	Premiere Night	Malaika Arora	For introducing the girl housemates
1	Day 3	Sima Taparia	To advice connections and rank their bond
1	Day 8	Sidharth Shukla and Shehnaaz Gill	For interacting with the housemates
2	Day 15	Rakhi Sawant and Hina Khan	For interacting with the housemates
3	Day 22	Sunny Leone	For a special task
4	Day 25 and 26	Nia Sharma	To spend 1 day inside the house
4	Day 26	Ankit Gupta	For a special task
4	Day 29	Nikki Tamboli and Rubina Dilaik	For interacting with the housemates
4	Day 29	Richa Chadda & Ronit Roy	To promote their web series Candy
5	Day 36	Neha Kakkar and Tony Kakkar	For interacting with the housemates
5	Day 36	Akshay Kakkar and Aashika Bhatia	To promote MX Taka Tak
5	Day 36	Rashami Desai and Devoleena Bhattacharjee	For interacting with the housemates
5	Day 36	Varun Sood (Divya's boyfriend)	To meet respective contestants
6	Day 37	Rashi Bhasin (Neha's sister)	To meet respective contestants
6	Day 37	Isha (Raqesh's niece)	To meet respective contestants
6	Day 37	Prerna Sehajpal (Pratik's sister)	To meet respective contestants
6	Day 37	Sunanda Shetty (Shamita's mother)	To meet respective contestants
6	Day 37	Punit Pathak (Nishant's friend)	To meet respective contestants
6	Day 41	Bharti Singh and Haarsh Limbachiyaa	To interact with the housemates
6	Grand Finale	Genelia D'Souza and Riteish Deshmukh	To interact with the housemates
6	Grand Finale	Rithvik Dhanjani and Karan Wahi	To interact with the housemates
