= Aisa Hota Hai =

- Directed by: Aashish Dubey
- Screenplay by: Aashish Dubey
- Story by: Aashish Dubey
- Produced by: Aashish Dubey
- Starring: Muzaffer Khan; Deba; Sahasra Pathak; Pritha Nag; Amar Yadav; Salman Zaidi; Aashish Dubey
- Cinematography: Ravindra Nath Guru
- Edited by: Pankaj Yadav & Rohit Kanth
- Release date: 27 March 2012 (Fribourg International Film Festival)
- Running time: 13 minutes
- Country: India
- Language: Hindi / English

Aisa Hota Hai (It Happens) is an Indian short film. The film stars Muzaffer Khan, Deba, Sahasra Pathak, Pritha Nag, Amar Yadav, Salman Zaidi, and Aashish Dubey in the lead, most of the cast is in this film is new. It is directed and produced by Aashish Dubey. The film is first screened at the Fribourg International Film Festival on 27 March 2012. Afterwards the film got selected in many film festivals like the New Jersey Independent South Asian Cine Fest, Indian Film Festival Stuttgart, Festival of Nations Film Festival AUSTRIA and many other film festivals around the world. The title of the film was taken from the song of Shaan and Sagarika's album Naujawan.

== Plot ==
The story is about five people who have met in mysterious circumstances. All of them are on the other side of the law. Each one of them tries to maximize as the story progresses. The situation is very volatile and keeps changing every moment. So each one of them has to think about what they need to do in order to survive the ordeal.

== Cast ==
- Muzaffer Khan as Javed Ali Khan
- Deba as Dina
- Sahasra Pathak as Riya
- Pritha Nag as Sonia
- Amar Yadav as Man in car -1
- Salman Zaidi as Man in car -2
- Aashish Dubey as Cop
