= Ace of Space 2 =

- Season 2
- Hosted by: Vikas Gupta
- No. of days: 72
- No. of contestants: 24
- Winner: Salman Zaidi
- Runner-up: Adnaan Shaikh
- No. of episodes: 72

Release
- Original network: MTV India
- Original release: 24 August – 3 November 2019

Season chronology
- ← Previous; Season 1 Next → Season 3

Ace of Space 2 is the second season of Indian reality competition television series, MTV Ace of Space. Hosted by Vikas Gupta, it aired from 24 August 2019 to 3 November 2019 on MTV India. After 72 days, Salman Zaidi was declared the winner.

== Concept ==
Eighteen contestants were divided into two teams: The Kings and The Jacks. They had to perform tasks, showcase their personalities and manage survival for 72 days amidst reducing space and increasing conflicts.

== Contestants ==
Sr.	Name	Entrant	Status	Entry	Exit
1	Salman Zaidi	Original	Winner	Day 1	Day 72
2	Adnan Shaikh	Wildcard	Runner-up	Day 35	Day 72
3	Baseer Ali	Original	2nd runner-up	Day 1	Day 72
4	Shruti Sinha	Original	3rd runner-up	Day 1	Day 72
5	Krissann Barretto	Original	4th runner-up	Day 1	Day 72
6	Prakruti Mishra	Original	5th runner-up	Day 1	Day 72
7	Rashmi Jha	Original	Evicted	Day 1	Day 68
8	Khushali Vyas	Original	Evicted	Day 1	Day 67
9	Deepak Thakur	Re-entrant	Evicted	Day 25	Day 65
9	Deepak Thakur	Original	Injured	Day 1	Day 7
10	Yash Rajput	Re-entrant	Walked	Day 36	Day 64
10	Yash Rajput	Original	Rejected by houseguests	Day 1	Day 35
11	Lucinda Nicholas	Original	Evicted	Day 1	Day 64
12	Khushi Chaudhary	Re-entrant	Evicted	Day 36	Day 57
12	Khushi Chaudhary	Wild-card	Rejected by houseguests	Day 34	Day 35
13	Manhar Seth	Original	Evicted	Day 1	Day 57
14	Luv Tyagi	Wild Card	Walked	Day 31	Day 51
15	Nikita Bhamidipati	Original	Evicted by Yash	Day 1	Day 49
16	Mandeep Gujjar	Wild Card	Evicted by Yash	Day 28	Day 42
17	Ramiz King	Wild Card	Evicted by Pearl	Day 29	Day 42
18	Pearl Almeida	Re-entrant	Evicted	Day 36	Day 40
18	Pearl Almeida	Wild-card	Ejected by houseguests	Day 22	Day 35
19	Ohm Kaliraman	Original	Evicted	Day 1	Day 35
20	Akshay Kakkar	Original	Evicted by houseguests	Day 1	Day 28
21	Renu Bhati	Original	Evicted	Day 1	Day 20
22	Roshni Misbah	Re-entrant	Walked	Day 13	Day 13
22	Roshni Misbah	Original	Evicted	Day 1	Day 13
23	Nasir Khan	Original	Walked	Day 1	Day 13
24	Rohit Singh Rajput	Original	Evicted	Day 1	Day 7

Male
Female

== Living Status ==
Contestant	Day 1–7	Day 7–13			Day 13–20		Day 20–26		Day 26–32			Day 32–37					Day 37–51				Day 51–71			Finale
Contestant	I	II	III	IV	V	VI	VII	VIII	IX	X	XI	XII	XIII	XIV	XV	XVI	XVII	XVIII	XIX	XX	XXI	XXII	XXIII	XXIV
Salman	Fantasy Room			Dungeon Room		Fantasy Room									N/A	Panic Room	Fantasy Room		Bunker Room			Panic Room		Winner
Adnaan	N/A															Games Room			Fantasy Room			Panic Room	Games Room	Runner Up
Baseer	Panic Room	Games Room	Dungeon Room	Fantasy Room		Dungeon Room													Games Room				Panic Room	Second Runner Up
Shruti	Bunker Room			Games Room				Panic Room							Games Room	Dungeon Room			Bunker Room			Fantasy Room	Panic Room	3rd Runner Up
Krissann	Fantasy Room		Bunker Room	Dungeon Room											Panic Room	Dungeon Room			Panic Room				Games Room	Evicted (Day 72)
Prakruti	Panic Room							Games Room							Bunker Room				Fantasy Room			Games Room	Panic Room	Evicted (Day 72)
Rashmi	Fantasy Room		Panic Room					Games Room							Dungeon Room	Games Room			Fantasy Room					Evicted (Day 72)
Khushali	Bunker Room			Panic Room											N/A	Fantasy Room			Bunker Room			Fantasy Room	Evicted (Day 67)	
Deepak	Games Room	Walked (Day 7)								Games Room					Panic Room	Fantasy Room			Panic Room	Fantasy Room			Evicted (Day 67)	
Yash	Dungeon Room		Fantasy Room	Bunker Room											N/A	Panic Room			Bunker Room	Games Room			Walked (Day 67)	
Lucinda	Games Room			Fantasy Room												Dungeon Room			Games Room			Evicted (Day 65)		
Khushi	N/A													Games Room	N/A	Panic Room						Evicted (Day 65)		
Manhar	Bunker Room																				Evicted (Day 51)			
Luv	N/A												Fantasy Room						Panic Room		Walked (Day 51)			
Nikita	Dungeon Room		Fantasy Room	Bunker Room											Dungeon Room	Bunker Room		Evicted (Day 40)						
Mandeep	N/A										Panic Room				Fantasy Room			Evicted (Day 40)						
Ramiz	N/A										Dungeon Room				Games Room		Evicted (Day 37)							
Pearl	N/A										Games Room				N/A	Bunker Room	Evicted (Day 37)							
Ohm	Panic Room			Games Room				Panic Room				Evicted (Day 32)												
Akshay	Bunker Room	Games Room						Panic Room	Evicted (Day 26)															
Renu	Dungeon Room						Evicted (Day 20)																	
Nasir	Dungeon Room				Walked (Day 13)																			
Roshni	Panic Room			Fantasy Room	Evicted (Day 13)																			
Rohit	Games Room	Evicted (Day 7)																						

=== Notes ===
Evicted
Walked

- ^Note 1: On Day 42, Dungeon Room was shut down and the housemates in that room were moved to other rooms.
- ^Note 2: On Day 65, Bunker Room was shut down and the housemates in that room were moved to other rooms.

== Trump & Dagger Card ==
Week 1	Week 2	Week 3	Week 4	Week 5	Week 6	Week 7	Week 8	Week 9	Week 10
Lucinda		Akshay	Baseer		Pearl	Yash	Prakruti	Khushali	Games Room
Nikita		Salman	Shruti			Luv			

=== Notes ===
Trump Card Winner
Dagger Card Receiver

- ^Note 1: On Day 6, Rashmi had the power to give the Dagger Card to any housemate as Lucinda, the Trump Card winner, chose Rashmi as the best performer. Rashmi chose to give the Dagger Card to Nikita.
- ^Note 2: On Day 7, Lucinda, being the Trump Card winner, had the power to shift two housemates to her room aka the Game Room. She chose Akshay and Baseer.
- ^Note 3: On Day 16, Lucinda and Ohm, being the winners of the wrestling task had the power to give the Dagger Card to any housemate. They gave it to Salman.
- ^Note 4: In Week 4, Krissann had the power to give the Dagger Card to either Baseer or Shruti. She chose to give it to Shruti.
- ^Note 5: On Day 26, Shivin Narang had the power to give the Trump Card to any housemate. He chose to give it to Baseer.
- ^Note 6: Pearl, being the Trump Card winner, had the power to give the Dagger Card to any housemate. She chose Luv.

== Voting History ==
	Week 1	Week 2	Week 3	Week 4		Week 5	Week 6	Week 7	Week 8	Week 9	Week 10		
	Week 1	Week 2	Week 3	Day 21	Day 26	Week 5	Week 6	Week 7	Week 8	Week 9	Day 67	Day 72	
Contestant	Nomination				Vote To Save	Nomination					Semi Finale	Finale	
Salman	Rohan	Rashmi; Khushali	Baseer; Renu	Rashmi	Manhar	Ohm; Rashmi	Deepak; Manhar; Baseer	Not Eligible	Not Eligible	Salman	Finalist	Top 4	Winner (Day 72)
Adnaan	N/A							Not Eligible	Not Eligible	Deepak	Finalist	Top 4	1st (Day 72)
Baseer	Roshni	Akshay; Manhar	Salman	Prakruti	Manhar	Ohm; Rashmi	Prakruti; Salman; Khushali	Not Eligible	Not Eligible	Yash	Finalist	Top 4	2nd (Day 72)
Shruti	Akshay	Manhar; Rashmi	Khushali; Nikita	Yash	Manhar	Ohm; Rashmi	Nikita; Rashmi; Krissann	Not Eligible	Not Eligible	Shruti	Finalist	Top 4	4th (Day 72)
Krissann	Rohan	Rashmi; Ohm	Renu	Rashmi	Manhar	Ohm; Rashmi	Lucinda; Deepak; Manhar	Not Eligible	Not Eligible	Salman	Finalist	Evicted (Day 72)	
Prakruti	Roshni	Ohm; Akshay	Rashmi	Rashmi	Manhar	Ohm; Rashmi	Lucinda; Yash; Shruti	Not Eligible	Not Eligible	Khushi	Finalist	Evicted (Day 72)	
Rashmi	Rohan	Salman; Khushali; Roshni	Prakruti; Akshay	Nikita	Manhar	Yash; Khushali	Shruti; Krissann; Salman	Not Eligible	Not Eligible	Lucinda	Finalist	Evicted (Day 72)	
Khushali	Manhar	Manhar; Rashmi; Shruti	Rashmi	Rashmi	Manhar	Ohm; Rashmi	Salman; Baseer; Nikita	Not Eligible	Not Eligible	Shruti	Evicted by Baseer and Prakruti (Day 67)		
Deepak	Lucinda	Left, Health Issue (Day 7)				Baseer; Krissann; Shruti	Salman; Yash; Shruti	Not Eligible	Not Eligible	Adnaan; Deepak	Evicted by Baseer and Prakruti (Day 67)		
Yash	Nikita	Renu; Rashmi	Nikita; Shruti	Akshay	Manhar	Ohm; Rashmi	Khushali; Deepak; Salman	Not Eligible	Not Eligible	Yash	Walked (Day 67)		
Lucinda	Deepak	Akshay; Yash	Not Eligible	Nikita	Manhar	Ohm; Nikita	Pearl; Manhar; Krissann	Not Eligible	Not Eligible	Lucinda	Evicted (Day 64)		
Khushi	N/A						Pearl; Shruti	Not Eligible	Not Eligible	Khushi	Evicted (Day 64)		
Manhar	Akshay	Khushali; Baseer	Yash	Khushali	Not Eligible	Ohm; Rashmi	Lucinda; Pearl; Khushali	Not Eligible	Not Eligible	Evicted (Day 51)			
Luv	N/A						Baseer, Yash, Deepak	Not Eligible	Not Eligible	Quit (Day 51)			
Nikita	Yash	Renu; Rashmi	Yash	Rashmi	Manhar	Ohm; Rashmi	Lucinda; Deepak; Khushali	Not Eligible	Evicted by Yash (Day 40)				
Mandeep	N/A						Not Eligible	Not Eligible	Evicted by Yash (Day 40)				
Ramiz	N/A						Not Eligible	Evicted (Day 37)					
Pearl	N/A						Salman; Yash; Krissann	Evicted (Day 37)					
Ohm	Roshni	Roshni; Krissann	Not Eligible	Prakruti	Manhar	Yash; Khushali	Evicted (Day 32)						
Akshay	Manhar	Baseer; Nasir	Prakruti	Yash	Not Eligible	Evicted by housemates (Day 26)							
Renu	Nikita	Nasir; Rashmi	Salman; Shruti	Evicted (Day 20)									
Roshni	Prakruti	Ohm; Krissann	Evicted (Day 13)	Walked (Day 13)									
Nasir	Nikita	Renu; Akshay	Walked (Day 13)										
Rohit	Lucinda	Evicted (Day 7)											
Against public votes	Akshay; Baseer; ~~Lucinda~~; Manhar; Nasir; Nikita; Ohm; Rohit; Roshni	~~Akshay~~; Baseer; ~~Khushali~~; ~~Krissann~~; ~~Manhar~~; Nasir; ~~Ohm~~; Roshni; Shruti	Akshay; ~~Baseer~~; Khushali; Nikita; Prakruti; ~~Rashmi~~; Renu; Salman; Shruti; Yash	Akshay; Lucinda; Manhar; ~~Salman~~	Akshay; Manhar	Baseer; Khushali; Krissann; Nikita; Ohm; Rashmi; Shruti; Yash	Baseer; Deepak; ~~Mandeep~~; Manhar; Pearl; Ramiz; Salman; Shruti; Yash	Khushali; Krissann; Luv; ~~Mandeep~~; Manhar; ~~Nikita~~; ~~Prakruti~~; Salman	Krissann; Luv; Manhar; Salman; Shruti	Adnaan; Deepak; Khushi; Lucinda; Salman; Shruti; ~~Yash~~	Adnaan; Baseer; Deepak; Khushali; Krissann; Prakruti; Rashmi; Salman; Shruti; ~~Yash~~		
Walked	Deepak	Nasir	N/A						Luv	N/A	Yash	N/A	
Result	Rohit	Roshni	Renu	Akshay	Akshay; 0 of 11 votes to save	Ohm	Pearl	Mandeep; Yash's choice to evict	Manhar	Khushi	Deepak; Prakruti and Baseer's choice to evict	Rashmi	Salman
Result	Rohit	Roshni	Renu	Akshay	Akshay; 0 of 11 votes to save	Ohm	Pearl	Mandeep; Yash's choice to evict	Manhar	Khushi	Deepak; Prakruti and Baseer's choice to evict	Prakruti	Salman
Result	Rohit	Roshni	Renu	Manhar	Akshay; 0 of 11 votes to save	Ohm	Ramiz	Nikita; Yash's choice to evict	Manhar	Lucinda	Khushali; Prakruti and Baseer's choice to evict	Krissann	Adnaan
Result	Rohit	Roshni	Renu	Manhar	Akshay; 0 of 11 votes to save	Ohm	Ramiz	Nikita; Yash's choice to evict	Manhar	Lucinda	Khushali; Prakruti and Baseer's choice to evict	Shruti	Baseer

=== Notes ===
Immune
Pre–Nominated
Fewest Votes
Against Public Vote
Evicted
Left

- ^Note 1: On Day 2, Baseer and Ohm got nominated by the Mastermind for breaking the door and sneaking in food at midnight.
- ^Note 2: On Day 2, Fantasy Room nominated Rohan Mehra, unaware that he is not a housemate but a special guest who is uneligible for nomination or voting.
- ^Note 3: Chetna Pande and Rohan Mehra had the power to nominate any housemate. Chetna chose to nominate Nasir while Rohan nominated Rohit.
- ^Note 4: During Hold Your Space Task, Ohm came to perform instead of an injured Akshay without the consent of Team Kings. Thus, Team Kings were declared as the winners of the task leading to Lucinda getting safe from first week's nominations.
- ^Note 5: On Day 8; Prakruti was chosen as the best performer by Salman, Ohm, Roshni and Nasir, resulting in her getting immunity against second week nominations.
- ^Note 6: In Week 2, Rashmi and Renu were saved from nominations by Mastermind despite them getting the highest nominations from the housemates.
- ^Note 7: On Day 9, Mastermind gave a few choices to certain housemates to save themselves or their friends:
  - Akshay got the chance to save himself and Baseer from nominations in exchange of sending Baseer to Team Jacks. He chose the option, thus saving himself and Baseer.
  - Khushali got the option to save herself and Manhar from nominations in exchange of nominating Shruti. She chose to nominate Shruti, thus saving herself and Manhar from nominations.
  - Salman got the choice to save Krissann from nominations in exchange of shifting Krissann to Team Jacks and nominating Baseer for two weeks. He chose to go ahead with the option, thus nominating Baseer for two weeks.
  - Rashmi got the option to save Ohm from nominations in exchange of shifting to Team Jacks and nominating someone from Panic Room. She chose to nominate Roshni, thus saving Ohm.
- ^Note 8: On Day 16, Lucinda and Ohm were the winners of the wrestling task. Thus, they had the opportunity to save any housemate from nominations. Lucinda saved Baseer while Ohm saved Rashmi.
- ^Note 9: On Day 21, Nikita had the power to save any nominated housemates and nominate other housemates instead of them. She chose to save Prakruti, Khushali, Yash and herself. In place of them she nominated Manhar, Salman and Lucinda.
- ^Note 10: On Day 22, the nominated contestants chose Baseer, Ohm, Shruti and Krissann as the best performers of the task thus giving them the power to save either Manhar or Salman from nominations. Shruti chose Manhar while Baseer, Ohm and Krissann chose Salman. Due to majority being with Salman, it led to him getting saved from fourth week nominations.
- ^Note 11: On Day 26, the housemates had the option to save either Manhar or Akshay from getting eliminated. Out of 11 total votes, Manhar received 11 votes to be saved while Akshay received 0 votes to be saved thus leading to Akshay's eviction.
- ^Note 12: On Day 35, the housemates had the option to save either Mandeep or Ramiz from nominations. Receiving 10 votes out of 16, Mandeep got saved.
- ^Note 13: In Week 6, Mastermind nominated Khushali, Krissann, Mandeep, Nikita and Yash for the seventh week due to their laid back attitude in the ranking task.
- ^Note 14: On Day 38, Mastermind nominated Deepak for the seventh week as he broke the rules of the house.
- ^Note 15: On Day 39; Khushali, Nikita, Mandeep and Krissann failed to occupy the first two spots in the Be My Hero Task, resulting in their supporters Luv, Manhar, Prakruti and Salman respectively getting nominated for seventh week.
- ^Note 16: Due to Khushali, Luv and Nikita, Manhar occupying the bottom spots; it resulted in not only all of them getting nominated but also losing their nominating rights for the rest of their journey.
- ^Note 17: As Yash, Lucinda and Deepak, Adnaan managed to win the first two spots in the Be My Hero Task, not only were Deepak and Yash saved from the seventh week nominations, all four of them also got saved from the eighth week nominations.
- ^Note 18: On Day 40, Yash, being the Trump Card winner had the power to directly evict two housemates from among Nikita, Khushali, Luv and Mandeep. He chose to evict Mandeep and Nikita.
- ^Note 19: Prakruti and Krissann, being the Trump Card winners, had the power to save either of them from seventh week nominations. As both of them couldn't come to a unanimous decision, the power went to Deepak. He chose to save Prakruti.
- ^Note 20: On Day 52, the housemates were divided into teams of two. They had to decide which one of them would compete for the Ticket to Finale Task:
  - Adnaan and Deepak could not come to a unanimous decision resulting in both of them getting nominated.
  - Prakruti and Khushi decided to choose Prakruti for the Ticket to Finale, resulting in Khushi getting nominated.
  - Rashmi and Lucinda decided to choose Rashmi for the Ticket to Finale, resulting in Lucinda getting nominated.
  - Shruti and Khushali decided to choose Khushali for the Ticket to Finale, resulting in Shruti getting nominated.
  - Salman and Krissann decided to choose Krissann for the Ticket to Finale, resulting in Salman getting nominated.
  - Baseer and Yash decided to choose Baseer for the Ticket to Finale, resulting in Yash getting nominated.
- ^Note 21: On Day 67, Prakruti and Baseer, being the Trump Card winners, had the power to directly evict two housemates from the Fantasy Room. They chose to evict Deepak and Khushali.

== Guests ==
Episode	Name		Reference
1	Prince Narula	Yuvika Chaudhary	
1	Karanvir Bohra		
1	Aditi Bhatia		
1	Jasmin Bhasin		
3–5	Chetna Pande	Rohan Mehra	
9	Surbhi Jyoti		
16–17	Jay Bhanushali		
23	Urvashi Rautela	Tony Kakkar	
30–31	Adhish Khanna		
31	Shivin Narang		
39	Armaan Malik		
49–51	Erica Fernandes		
52–53	Pearl V Puri		
62	Krystle D'Souza	Anushka Ranjan	
65–66	Karan Kundra		
68–69	Neha Dhupia		
72	Sahil Khattar		
72	Neil Nitin Mukesh	Adah Sharma	
72	Vikrant Massey	Harleen Sethi	
72	Siddharth Nigam	Abhishek Nigam	
72	Shantanu Maheshwari		
72	Tejasswi Prakash		
72	Amrita Rao		
