= Divya Agarwal =

Indian actress, model, and dancer (born 1991)

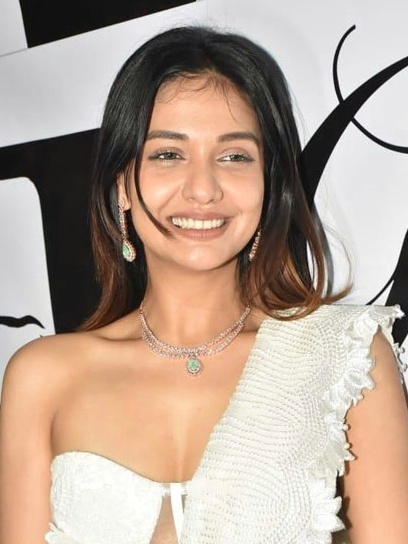
- Agarwal in 2023
- Born: 4 December 1991 (age 34)
- Occupations: Actress; model; dancer
- Years active: 2017–present
- Television: MTV Splitsvilla 10; Ace of Space 1; Bigg Boss OTT 1
- Spouse: Apurva Padgaonkar (m. 2024)

Divya Agarwal (born 4 December 1991) is an Indian actress, model and dancer known for participating in several reality shows. She is the runner-up of MTV Splitsvilla 10 and winner of Ace of Space 1, Bigg Boss OTT 1. She made her acting debut with the horror web series Ragini MMS: Returns 2.

== Background and early career ==
Agarwal got her master's degree in journalism. She trained in dance from Terence Lewis Dance Academy, and then opened her own dance academy called Elevate Dance Institute. She has choreographed several actresses like Ileana D'Cruz, Sunny Leone and Shilpa Shetty. In 2010, she and a Pakistani choreographer worked on choreography for the IPL 2010.

She had also participated in several beauty pageants. In 2015, she won the title of "Miss Navi Mumbai". In 2016, she was crowned the winner of the Indian Princess pageant She also won Miss Tourism India International.

== Career ==
Agarwal rose to fame in 2017 when she participated in MTV India's Splitsvilla 10 wherein she finished as the runner-up with Priyank Sharma.

In 2018, she would act as a mentor in MTV India's Date To Remember show. In March 2018, Agarwal and Splitsvilla 10 contestant Baseer Ali guest co-hosted an episode of On Road With Roadies. In October, she participated in MTV India's Ace of Space 1 where she emerged as the winner.

In January 2019, Agarwal starred in her first international project by participating in Travel With A Goat, broadcast on Insight TV, where she and television celebrity chef Dean Edwards travel across Bulgaria with a sheep and must decide whether to have it slaughtered or save its life. In February 2019, she made a cameo appearance in Alt Balaji's web drama Puncch Beat. In March, Agarwal and Varun Sood participated as Roadies Insiders for Roadies: Real Heroes, broadcast on Voot. Next, she hosted Voot's Voot Night Live with RJ Anmol. In December, she starred opposite Sood to play Ragini/Savitri Devi in season 2 of Alt Balaji's horror web series Ragini MMS: Returns. In 2020, Agarwal and Sood co-hosted the Ace of Space spinoff MTV Ace the Quarantine.

In 2021, Agarwal participated in Voot's Bigg Boss OTT 1 and emerged as the winner. She also portrayed a mysterious make-up artist character named Grissy in the action-drama web series Cartel. In June 2026, she entered as Sushantha in Colors TV's Naagin 7.

== Personal life ==
In 2017, She met actor and model Priyank Sharma on MTV Splitsvilla 10 where they were both runners-up. They were dating post Splitsvilla and Agarwal entered Bigg Boss 11 to part ways with Sharma.

In 2018, she met actor and former MTV Roadies contestant Varun Sood. They worked together on Roadies: Real Heroes and MTV Ace of Space. Following Ace of Space, she and Sood confirmed they are dating. On 6 March 2022, she announced on social media that they had split.

On 28 October 2020, Agarwal's father died due to complications from COVID-19.

On 4 December 2022, she got engaged to Apurva Padgaonkar, a businessman and restaurateur, when he proposed her on her birthday party.

== Media perception ==
Agarwal was listed sixth among Times of India's Top 20 Most Desirable Women On Indian Television List in 2019, and nineteenth in 2020.

== Filmography ==
=== Films ===
Year	Title	Role	Notes	Ref.
2017	The Final Exit	Herself	In the song "Dum Maro Dum Maro"	
2018	Pratibha	Herself	In the song "Khelu 20/20 Rey"	

=== Television ===
Year	Title	Role	Notes	Ref.
2017	MTV Splitsvilla 10	Contestant	1st runner-up	
2017	Bigg Boss 11	Herself	Guest	
2018	Box Cricket League 3	Contestant		
2018	MTV Roadies Xtreme	Herself	Guest	
2018	A Date to Remember	Mentor		
2018	MTV Ace of Space 1	Contestant	Winner	
2019	Travel with a Goat	Co-host	Episode "Sheep"	
2019	Roadies: Real Heroes	Roadies Insider		
2020	MTV Ace the Quarantine	Host		
2021	Bigg Boss OTT 1	Contestant	Winner	
2022	Bigg Boss 15	Herself	Guest	
2026	The 50	Contestant	Eliminated Day 23 (20th/50th place)	
2026	Naagin 7	Sushantha	Guest appearance	
2027	Naagin 8	Sushantha	Villain	

=== Web series ===
Year	Title	Role	Notes	Ref.
2019	Puncch Beat	Herself	Guest	
2019	Ragini MMS: Returns	Ragini	Season 2	
2021	Cartel	Grizzey		
2022	Abhay	Harleen	Season 3	
2022	Lock Upp	Herself	Guest	
2023	Fuh Se Fantasy	Anjali	Season 2	
2023	Tatlubaaz	Disha	Epic On	

=== Music videos ===
Year	Title	Singer(s)	Notes	Ref.
2017	"Bewafa"	Siddharth Bhatt		
2017	"Hume Tumse Pyaar Kitna"	Ramji Gulati, Tushar Jules	Title song cover	
2017	"Dil Ko Tumse Pyar Hua"	Harish Moyal, Ramji Gulati	Song cover from the film Rehnaa Hai Terre Dil Mein	
2018	"Aho Raya Mala"	Vaishali Mhade	Song from the film Friendship Band	
2018	"Bob Marley"	Suyyash Rai, Star Boy Loc		
2018	"Chance"	Bobby Newberry		
2019	"Baby Baby"	AB Rockstar		
2019	"Naam Ada Likhna"	Madhubanti Bagchi, Shreyas Puranik	Song cover from the film Yahaan	
2020	"Fitrat"	Suyyash Rai		
2021	"Kareeb"	Vishal Dadlani	Dance cover	
2021	"Ishq Nibhava"	Nitin Gupta, Rupali Jagga		
2021	"Koi Sehri Babu"	Shruti Rane		
2022	"Dur Hua"	Asim Riaz		
2022	"Bechari"	Afsana Khan		
2022	"Resham Ka Rumal"	Shruti Rane		
2023	"Rista Rista"	Stebin Ben		
2025	"Rootha Mera Ishq"	Yasser Desai, Amol Shrivastava, Abhishek Talented		
