= Dhinchak Pooja =

Indian YouTuber (born 1993)

- Born: 28 December 1993 (age 32); Uttar Pradesh, India
- Occupations: YouTuber; singer; songwriter

YouTube information
- Channel: Dhinchak Pooja
- Genre: Pop
- Subscribers: 744 thousand
- Views: 178.9 million
- Last updated: 28 January 2026

Pooja Jain (born 28 December 1993), better known as Dhinchak Pooja, is an Indian YouTuber. She was a contestant on the reality show Bigg Boss in 2017, and is often considered as the queen of cringe pop.

== Music videos ==
Dhinchak Pooja received media attention after her music videos such as Swag Wali Topi (2015), Daaru (2016), Selfie Maine Leli Aaj (2017), Dilon Ka Shooter (2017), Baapu Dede Thoda Cash (2017), and Aafreen Fathima Bewafa Hai (2017), received millions of views on YouTube, shortly after their individual releases. Her songs have been subject to wide-ranging criticism, and have often been described as part of a new trend of producing cringe-worthy videos to gain web-fame. On 11 June 2017, in response to an individual complaint, YouTube deleted all the song-videos on grounds of privacy violation.

The videos, though have been re-uploaded by other users and continue to be available. Pooja released a new video after a year in 2019 titled Naach ke Pagal (2019), which she has since deleted from her YouTube channel. In 2020 she uploaded a new song regarding the coronavirus pandemic titled Hoga Na Karona in which she talks about taking precautionary measures to stop the spreading of the disease.

== Other activities ==
She featured on BBC Asian Network, in an episode titled: "Dhinchak Pooja and Nakash Aziz" and in a programme by Tommy Sandhu. Jain was chosen as a participant in Bigg Boss 11, through a wild card she was evicted on 5 November 2017.

== Filmography ==
=== Television ===
Year	Show	Role
2017	Bigg Boss 11	Contestant
2017	Entertainment Ki Raat	Herself
2024	Laughter Chefs – Unlimited Entertainment	Herself

== Personal life ==
Pooja Jain was born on 28 December 1993. She was born and brought up in Uttar Pradesh. She has a Bachelor of Arts degree.
