= MTV Ace of Space =

- Also known as: Ace of Space
- Genre: Reality
- Created by: Vikas Gupta
- Presented by: Vikas Gupta (2018—2019)
- Country of origin: India
- Original language: Hindi
- No. of seasons: 2

Production
- Production locations: Mumbai, Maharashtra, India
- Production company: Endemol Shine India

Original release
- Network: MTV India
- Release: 20 October 2018 – 3 November 2019

MTV Ace of Space is an Indian reality competition television series that aired on MTV India. Created and hosted by Vikas Gupta, it premiered on 20 October 2018.

== Series ==
Season	Host	Launch Date	Finale Date	Days	Housemates	Winner	Runner Up	Reference
1	Vikas Gupta	20 October 2018	31 December 2018	71	20	Divya Agarwal	Pratik Sehajpal	
2	Vikas Gupta	24 August 2019	3 November 2019	72	24	Salman Zaidi	Adnaan Shaikh	

== Season 1 ==
Ace of Space 1 is the first season of Indian reality competition television series, MTV Ace of Space. Hosted by Vikas Gupta, it aired from 20 October 2018 to 31 December 2018 on MTV India. After 71 days, Divya Agarwal emerged as the winner of the season.

=== Contestants ===
Sr.	Name	Entrant	Status	Entry	Exit
1	Divya	Original	Winner	Day 1	Day 71
2	Pratik	Original	1st runner-up	Day 1	Day 71
3	Varun	Original	2nd runner-up	Day 1	Day 71
4	Shehzad	Original	3rd runner-up	Day 1	Day 71
5	Faisal	Original	4th runner-up	Day 1	Day 71
6	Miesha	Original	5th runner-up	Day 1	Day 71
7	Fizah	Original	Semi finalist	Day 1	Day 67
8	Abhiraj	Original	Semi finalist	Day 1	Day 63
9	Danish	Original	Walked	Day 1	Day 43
9	Danish	Re-Entrant	Rejected by Chetna	Day 51	Day 58
10	Chetna	Original	Evicted by Shehzad	Day 1	Day 58
11	Omprakash	Original	Evicted	Day 1	Day 22
11	Omprakash	Re–Entrant	Evicted	Day 31	Day 50
12	Riya	Original	Evicted	Day 1	Day 43
13	Sambhav	Original	Evicted	Day 1	Day 22
13	Sambhav	Re–Entrant	Walked	Day 31	Day 40
14	Sankalp	Original	Evicted	Day 1	Day 22
14	Sankalp	Re–Entrant	Walked	Day 31	Day 40
15	Akanksha	Original	Evicted	Day 1	Day 35
16	Kamz	Original	Evicted	Day 1	Day 29
17	Nadia	Wild Card	Evicted by Abhiraj Varun & Fizah	Day 10	Day 23
18	Pooja	Original	Evicted by Houseguests	Day 1	Day 15
19	Deepak	Original	Evicted	Day 1	Day 8
20	Tenzin	Original	Ejected	Day 1	Day 5

Male
Female

== Season 2 ==
Ace of Space 2 is the second season of Indian reality competition television series, MTV Ace of Space. Hosted by Vikas Gupta, it aired from 24 August 2019 to 3 November 2019 on MTV India. After 72 days, Salman Zaidi was declared as the winner.

=== Contestants ===
Sr.	Name	Entrant	Status	Entry	Exit
1	Salman Zaidi	Original	Winner	Day 1	Day 72
2	Adnan Shaikh	Wildcard	Runner-up	Day 35	Day 72
3	Baseer Ali	Original	2nd Runner-up	Day 1	Day 72
4	Shruti Sinha	Original	3rd Runner-up	Day 1	Day 72
5	Krissann Barretto	Original	4th Runner-up	Day 1	Day 72
6	Prakruti Mishra	Original	5th Runner-up	Day 1	Day 72
7	Rashmi Jha	Original	Evicted	Day 1	Day 68
8	Khushali Vyas	Original	Evicted	Day 1	Day 68
9	Deepak Thakur	Re-entrant	Evicted	Day 27	Day 64
9	Deepak Thakur	Original	Injured	Day 1	Day 7
10	Yash Rajput	Re-entrant	Walked	Day 36	Day 64
10	Yash Rajput	Original	Rejected by houseguests	Day 1	Day 35
11	Lucinda Nicholas	Original	Evicted	Day 1	Day 64
12	Khushi Chaudhary	Re-entrant	Evicted	Day 36	Day 57
12	Khushi Chaudhary	Wild-card	Rejected by houseguests	Day 34	Day 35
13	Manhar Seth	Original	Evicted	Day 1	Day 57
14	Luv Tyagi	Wild Card	Walked	Day 31	Day 51
15	Nikita Bhamidipati	Original	Evicted by Yash	Day 1	Day 49
16	Mandeep Gujjar	Wild Card	Evicted by Yash	Day 28	Day 42
17	Ramiz King	Wild Card	Evicted by Pearl	Day 29	Day 42
18	Pearl Almeida	Re-entrant	Evicted	Day 36	Day 40
18	Pearl Almeida	Wild-card	Ejected by houseguests	Day 22	Day 35
19	Ohm Kaliraman	Original	Evicted	Day 1	Day 35
20	Akshay Kakkar	Original	Evicted by houseguests	Day 1	Day 28
21	Renu Bhati	Original	Evicted	Day 1	Day 20
22	Roshni Misbah	Re-entrant	Walked	Day 13	Day 13
22	Roshni Misbah	Original	Evicted	Day 1	Day 13
23	Nasir Khan	Original	Walked	Day 1	Day 13
24	Rohit Singh Rajput	Original	Evicted	Day 1	Day 7

Male
Female

== Production ==
=== Season 1 ===
On 5 October 2018, Vikas Gupta released the first promo of Ace of Space 1.

Eighteen contestants fought it out in six rooms to win the audiences' hearts and space in the house. They had to perform difficult tasks to ensure survival. After 71 days, the contestant with the highest votes and space walked away with the title of Ace of Space.

As the mastermind of the show, it will be pretty exciting to play with the minds of contestants and bring out the basic instinct of survival to mark one's territory using your heart and brain equally.

— Vikas Gupta

=== Season 2 ===
On 3 August 2019, Vikas Gupta shared the first promo of Ace of Space 2.

Eighteen contestants were divided into two sections: Team Kings, who had access to luxuries and Team Jacks, who did not have access to even basic necessities. They had to perform tasks and manage survival for 72 days. Coupled with this, the season had an enhanced digital interaction.

Ace of Space 1 was an experimental show which did extremely well, and we succeeded in making our way into our viewers heart, as we tested the houseguests and made them choose between head and heart. With the second season it’s going to be more tough and challenging as I will be testing their beliefs and conditioning.

— Vikas Gupta

== Ace of Quarantine ==
A spin-off series Ace of Quarantine, hosted by Divya Aggarwal and Varun Sood was launched on 12 July 2020.
