= Ace of Space 1 =

- Season 1
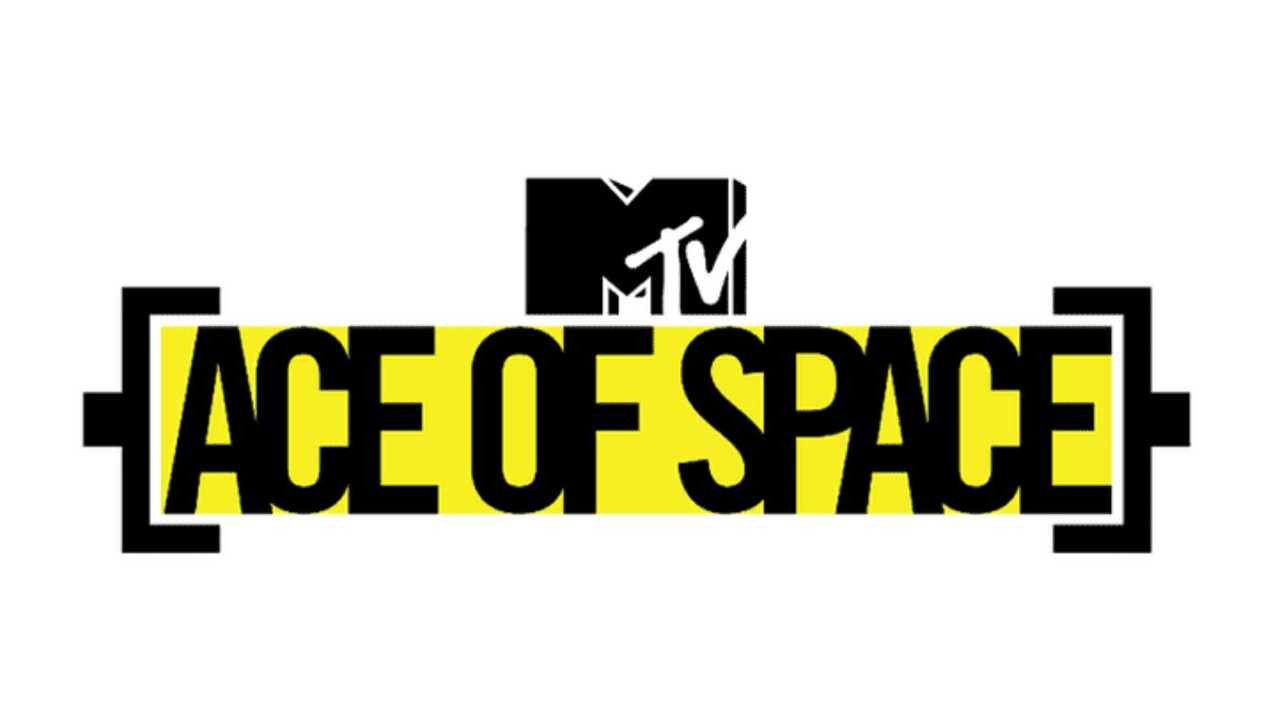
- Starring: see below
- Hosted by: Vikas Gupta
- No. of days: 71
- No. of contestants: 20
- Winner: Divya Agarwal
- Runner-up: Pratik Sehajpal
- No. of episodes: 73

Release
- Original network: MTV India
- Original release: 20 October – 31 December 2018

Season chronology
- Next → Season 2

Ace Of Space 1 is the first season of Indian reality competition television series, MTV Ace of Space. Hosted by Vikas Gupta, it aired from 20 October 2018 to 31 December 2018 on MTV India. After 71 days, Divya Agarwal emerged as the winner of the season.

== Concept ==
Eighteen contestants fought it out in six rooms to win space in the house and in the hearts of the audience by performing difficult tasks and showcasing their personalities. After 71 days, the contestant with the highest votes combined with the space attained walked away with the title of Ace of Space 1.

== Contestants ==
Sr.	Name	Entrant	Status	Entry	Exit
1	Divya Agarwal	Original	Winner	Day 1	Day 71
2	Pratik Sehajpal	Original	1st runner-up	Day 1	Day 71
3	Varun Sood	Original	2nd runner-up	Day 1	Day 71
4	Shehzad Deol	Original	3rd runner-up	Day 1	Day 71
5	Faisal Khan	Original	4th runner-up	Day 1	Day 71
6	Miesha Iyer	Original	5th runner-up	Day 1	Day 71
7	Fizah Khan	Original	Semi Finalist	Day 1	Day 67
8	Abhiraj Chadha	Original	Semi Finalist	Day 1	Day 63
9	Danish Zehen	Original	Walked	Day 1	Day 43
9	Danish Zehen	Re-Entrant	Ejected by Chetna	Day 51	Day 58
10	Chetna Pande	Original	Evicted by Shehzad	Day 1	Day 57
11	Omprakash	Original	Evicted	Day 1	Day 22
11	Omprakash	Re–Entrant	Evicted	Day 31	Day 50
12	Riya Subodh	Original	Evicted	Day 1	Day 43
13	Sambhav Sharma	Original	Evicted	Day 1	Day 22
13	Sambhav Sharma	Re–Entrant	Walked	Day 31	Day 40
14	Sankalp Sharma	Original	Evicted	Day 1	Day 22
14	Sankalp Sharma	Re–Entrant	Walked	Day 31	Day 40
15	Akanksha Singh	Original	Evicted	Day 1	Day 35
16	Kamz	Original	Evicted	Day 1	Day 29
17	Nadia Shah	Wild Card	Evicted by Abhiraj Varun & Fizah	Day 10	Day 23
18	Pooja Sen	Original	Evicted by Houseguests	Day 1	Day 15
19	Deepak Tuteja	Original	Evicted	Day 1	Day 9
20	Tenzin Mariko	Original	Ejected	Day 1	Day 8

Male
Female

== Living Status ==
Contestant	Day 1–8			Day 8–15		Day 15–22		Day 22–29		Day 29–35		Day 35–43			Day 43–58				Day 58–63	Day 63–69		Day 69–71	Finale
Contestant	I	II	III	IV	V	VI	VII	VIII	IX	X	XI	XII	XIII	XIV	XV	XVI	XVII	XVIII	XIX	XX	XXI	XXII	XXIII
Divya	Living Room						Kids Room				Wing B			Kids Room			Bed Room						Winner
Pratik	Bed Room						Kids Room				Wing B			Kids Room							Gym Room		Runner Up
Varun	Living Room						Gym Room				Wing A			Gym Room			Bed Room						Second Runner Up
Shehzad	Gym Room						Bed Room				Wing A			Bedroom			Gym Room					Bed Room	Evicted (Day 71)
Faisal	Gym Room		Living Room				Bath Room		Kids Room		Wing B			Kids Room							Gym Room		Evicted (Day 71)
Miesha	Living Room		Gym Room				Bed Room				Wing A			Bedroom			Kids Room				Gym Room	Bed Room	Evicted (Day 71)
Fizah	Kids Room		Store Room		Kids Room						Wing B			Kids Room			Gym Room	Evicted (Day 57)	Gym Room		Bed Room	Evicted (Day 69)	
Abhiraj	Kids Room						Living Room				Wing B			Living Room			Gym Room			Evicted (Day 63)			
Chetna	Bed Room						Gym Room				Wing A			Gym Room			Bed Room		Evicted (Day 58)				
Omprakash	Kids Room						Bath Room	Evicted (Day 22)			Wing B			Living Room		Re-Evicted (Day 50)							
Danish	Bed Room						Gym Room				Wing A			Gym Room	Emergency (Day 43)								
Riya	Store Room		Bath Room				Gym Room				Wing A			Gym Room	Evicted (Day 43)								
Sambhav	Paired with Sankalp										Wing B		Family Issue (Day 40)										
Sankalp	Paired with Sambhav										Wing A		Family Issue (Day 40)										
Akanksha	Gym Room						Living Room				Wing B	Evicted (Day 35)											
Sambhav & Sankalp	Bath Room						Living Room	Evicted (Day 22)	Split														
Kamz	Store Room				Bath Room				Living Room	Evicted (Day 29)													
Nadia	N/A				Bed Room				Evicted (Day 23)														
Pooja	Bathroom		Kids Room			Evicted (Day 15)																	
Deepak	Store Room		Evicted (Day 8)																				
Tenzin	Bath Room	Health Issue (Day 5)																					

=== Notes ===
Evicted
Left

- ^Note 1: On Day 10, Store Room was shut down and the housemates in that room were moved to other rooms.
- ^Note 2: On Day 23, Bathroom was shut down and the housemates in that room were moved to other rooms.
- ^Note 3: On Day 31, the House was divided into 2 Wings: Gym & Bedroom as Wing A and Living Room & Kids Room as Wing B.
- ^Note 4: On Day 54, Living Room was shut down and the housemates in that room were moved to other rooms.
- ^Note 5: On Day 67, Kids Room was shut down and the housemates in that room were moved to other rooms.

== Trump Card ==
Trump Card	Week 1	Week 2	Week 3	Week 4	Week 5	Week 6	Week 7	Week 8	Week 9	Week 10
#1	Bedroom		Varun	Divya	Faisal		Chetna		Shehzad	Gym Room
#2	Bathroom		Abhiraj	Riya	Miesha		Chetna		Fizah	Gym Room

=== Notes ===
Trump Card Winner

- ^Note 1: On Day 6, Bathroom's Trump Card was disqualified, because the roommates phone pranked Shehzad into believing there was a secret task assigned to him.
- ^Note 2: In Week 2, the task was cancelled due to violation of rules, thus none of the rooms were able to win the Trump Card.

== Voting History ==
	Week 1	Week 2		Week 3		Week 4	Week 5		Week 6	Week 7	Week 8		Week 9	Week 10		
	Week 1	Day 9	Day 15	Day 16	Day 22	Week 4	Week 5		Week 6	Week 7	Week 8		Week 9	Day 69	Day 71	
Contestant	Nomination		Vote To Evict	Nomination	Vote To Save	Nomination		Saved	Nomination			Vote To Save	Saved	Semi Finale	Finale	
Divya	Not Eligible	Bathroom & Kids Room	Sambhav & Sankalp	Faisal; Omprakash	Fizah	Divya	Shehzad; Danish	Not Eligible	Shehzad	Not Eligible	Abhiraj; Miesha	Pratik	Not Eligible	Finalist	Top 3	Winner (Day 71)
Pratik	Chetna	Living Room & Bathroom; Kids Room	Sambhav & Sankalp	Sambhav & Sankalp; Fizah	Omprakash	Divya	Varun	Not Eligible	Not Eligible	Not Eligible	Abhiraj; Miesha	Not Eligible	Divya	Finalist	Top 3	Runner Up (Day 71)
Varun	Varun; Miesha	Bathroom & Store Room	Pooja	Faisal; Omprakash	Omprakash	Riya; Nadia	Not Eligible	Not Eligible	Riya	Omprakash; Fizah; Pratick	Abhiraj; Miesha	Pratick	Divya	Finalist	Top 3	Second Runner Up (Day 71)
Shehzad	Faisal	Bathroom & Store Room	Sambhav & Sankalp	Akanksha; Sambhav & Sankalp	Omprakash	Not Eligible	Not Eligible	Not Eligible	Not Eligible	Omprakash; Fizah; Divya	Abhiraj; Miesha	Pratick	Divya; Miesha; Abhiraj	Finalist	Evicted (Day 71)	
Faisal	Shehzad	Bathroom & Kids Room	Pooja	Divya; Omprakash	Fizah	Divya	Not Eligible	Not Eligible	Not Eligible	Not Eligible	Abhiraj; Miesha	Fizah	Divya	Finalist	Evicted (Day 71)	
Miesha	Not Eligible	Bathroom & Store Room	Pooja	Shehzad; Pratick	Fizah	Not Eligible	Not Eligible	Divya	Not Eligible	Abhiraj; Faisal; Omprakash	Faisal; Shehzad	Pratick	Not Eligible	Finalist	Evicted (Day 71)	
Fizah	Omprakash	Kids Room & Gym	Sambhav & Sankalp	Abhiraj; Varun	Not Eligible	Divya	Not Eligible	Divya	Not Eligible	Not Eligible	Abhiraj; Miesha	Not Eligible	Evicted (Day 57)	Re-Evicted (Day 69)		
Abhiraj	Not Eligible	Living Room & Store Room	Pooja	Fizah; Pratick	Omprakash	Kamz; Nadia	Not Eligible	Divya	Fizah	Not Eligible	Faisal; Shehzad	Not Eligible	Not Eligible	Evicted (Day 63)		
Chetna	Pratick	Living Room & Bathroom; Kids Room	Sambhav & Sankalp	Pratik; Sambhav & Sankalp	Omprakash	Riya	Not Eligible	Not Eligible	Not Eligible	Pratick; Abhiraj; Divya	Abhiraj; Miesha	Pratick	Not Eligible	Evicted (Day 58)		
Omprakash	Fizah	Living Room & Store Room	Pooja	Fizah; Varun	Not Eligible	Evicted (Day 22)			Not Eligible	Not Eligible	Re-Evicted (Day 50)					
Danish	Not Eligible	Living Room & Bathroom; Kids Room	Sambhav & Sankalp	Pratick, Fizah	Fizah	Riya	Not Eligible	Not Eligible	Not Eligible	Left, Emergency (Day 43)				Left (Day 58)		
Riya	Deepak	Gym & Store Room	Sambhav & Sankalp	Sambhav & Sankalp; Shehzad	Fizah	Riya	Chetna; Akanksha; Faisal	Not Eligible	Not Eligible	Evicted (Day 43)						
Sambhav	Paired with Sankalp				Evicted (Day 22)				Not Eligible	Left, Family Issue (Day 40)						
Sankalp	Paired with Sambhav				Evicted (Day 22)				Pratick	Left, Family Issue (Day 40)						
Akanksha	Not Eligible	Bathroom & Store Room	Sambhav & Sankalp	Shehzad; Pratick	Omprakash	Kamz	Not Eligible	Not Eligible	Evicted (Day 35)							
Sambhav & Sankalp	Tenzin	Gym & Store Room	Not Eligible	Riya; Pratick	Evicted (Day 22)				Split							
Kamz	Not Eligible	Kids Room & Gym	Pooja	Sambhav & Sankalp; Pratick	Fizah	Kamz	Evicted (Day 29)									
Nadia	N/A		Pooja	Chetna; Danish; Pratick; Miesha	Fizah	Not Eligible	Evicted (Day 23)									
Pooja	Not Eligible	Living Room & Store Room	Not Eligible	Evicted (Day 15)												
Deepak	Riya	Evicted (Day 8)														
Tenzin	Sambhav & Sankalp	Left, Health Issue (Day 5)														
Nominated	Chetna; Deepak; Faisal; Fizah; Miesha; Omprakash; Pratick; Riya; Sambhav & Sankalp; Shehzad; ~~Tenzin~~; Varun	Abhiraj; Fizah; Kamz; Omprakash; Pooja; Riya; Sambhav & Sankalp	Pooja; Sambhav & Sankalp	Chetna; Danish; Fizah; Omprakash; Pratick; Sambhav & Sankalp; Shehzad	Fizah; Omprakash	Divya; Kamz; Miesha; ~~Nadia~~; Riya; Shehzad	Akanksha; Chetna; Danish; Faisal; Riya; Shehzad; Varun		Chetna; ~~Danish~~; Fizah; Pratick; Riya; Shehzad	Abhiraj; Divya; Fizah; Omprakash; Pratick; Varun	Abhiraj; Faisal; Fizah; Miesha; Pratick; Shehzad; Varun	Fizah; Pratick	Abhiraj; Faisal; Miesha; Pratick; Varun	Divya; Faisal; Fizah; Miesha; Pratick; Shehzad; Varun		
Walked	Tenzin	N/A							Sambhav	N/A						
Walked	Tenzin	N/A							Sankalp	N/A						
Walked	Tenzin	N/A							Danish	N/A						
Result	Deepak	Pooja	Pooja; 7 of 15 votes to evict; Pooja's choice to self evict	Sambhav & Sankalp	Omprakash; 6 of 13 votes to save	Nadia; Varun & Abhiraj's choice to evict	Akanksha		Riya; Riya's choice to self evict by saving Fizah	Omprakash	Fizah	Fizah; 1 of 6 votes to save	Chetna; Shehzad's choice to not save	Fizah	Miesha; 6th Place	Divya; Winner
Result	Deepak	Sambhav & Sankalp	Pooja; 7 of 15 votes to evict; Pooja's choice to self evict	Sambhav & Sankalp	Omprakash; 6 of 13 votes to save	Kamz	Akanksha		Riya; Riya's choice to self evict by saving Fizah	Omprakash	Pratick	Fizah; 1 of 6 votes to save	Abhiraj	Fizah	Faisal; 5th Place	Pratick; Runner Up
Result	Deepak	Sambhav & Sankalp	Pooja; 7 of 15 votes to evict; Pooja's choice to self evict	Sambhav & Sankalp	Omprakash; 6 of 13 votes to save	Kamz	Akanksha		Riya; Riya's choice to self evict by saving Fizah	Omprakash	Pratick	Fizah; 1 of 6 votes to save	Abhiraj	Fizah	Shehzad; 4th Place	Varun; Second Runner Up

=== Notes ===
Immune
Pre-Nominated
Fewest Votes
Against Public Vote
Evicted
Left

- ^Note 1: In Week 1, the first one to receive the phone call in their respective rooms got the power to nominate a housemate from their room. The nominated housemates then got the power to nominate another housemate from their room.
- ^Note 2: In Week 2, Bedroom, having won the Trump Card had the power to directly nominate a room for eviction. They chose to nominate the Kids Room.
- ^Note 3: In Week 2, Nadia got the opportunity to get immunity if she chose to nominate two housemates from her room. She nominated Danish and Chetna, hence getting immune in third week.
- ^Note 4: In Week 3, the housemates had to nominate one housemate from their room and another one from the rest of the house. Bedroom had no option but to nominate Pratick, as Danish and Chetna were already nominated and Nadia was safe.
- ^Note 5: On Day 20, Miesha was directly nominated for Week 4, due to her behaviour during a tiff between her and Nadia.
- ^Note 6: On Day 19, Akash Dadlani gave the Dagger Card to the Bedroom resulting in Miesha, Shehzad and Nadia straight away getting nominated for fourth week.
- ^Note 7: In Week 4, the Gym, Kids Room & Living Room had to mutually nominate a housemate from their room.
- ^Note 8: On Day 23, Trump Card winners Varun and Abhiraj had the power to directly evict one of the fourth week nominees. They chose to evict Nadia.
- ^Note 9: In Week 5, Divya and Riya, being the Trump Card winners had the power to nominate people by wrestling and winning bouts. Divya nominated Shehzad and Danish; Riya nominated Chetna, Akanksha and Faisal. Miesha, Fizah and Abhiraj being safe got the power to save either Divya or Riya. All three chose to save Divya.
- ^Note 10: On Day 53; Fizah, Faisal, Pratick and Varun were banned from taking part in the nominations process and were nominated for the rest of the season due to violence in the Farm Task.
- ^Note 11: In Week 9, Chetna had the power to choose who will re-enter the house out of Fizah and Danish. She chose Fizah.

== Guests ==
Episode	Name		Reference
1	Rashami Desai	Balraj Syal	
1	Aparshakti Khurana		
1	Harrdy Sandhu		
2	Karan Kundra	Anusha Dandekar	
13	Karan Patel		
16	Shibani Dandekar		
18	Sahil Khattar		
19–20	Akash Dadlani		
23	Rannvijay Singh		
30	Nia Sharma		
31–32	Parth Samthaan		
37	Karan Tacker		
43	Sara Ali Khan	Abhishek Kapoor	
44	Surbhi Jyoti		
52	Mahie Gill	Arunoday Singh	
58	Prince Narula	Yuvika Chaudhary	
63	Raftaar		
66	Yami Gautam	Vicky Kaushal	
72	Mantra	Evelyn Sharma	
72	Shruti Sinha		
72	Rohit Suchanti	Anshuman Malhotra	
73	Gurmeet Choudhary	Debina Bonnerjee	
73	Parth Samthaan		
