= Vikas Gupta =

Indian screenwriter, host (born 1988)

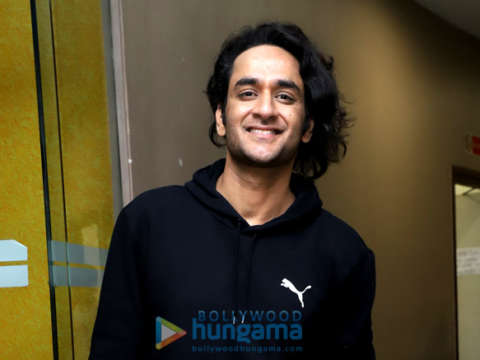
- Gupta in 2019
- Born: 7 May 1988 (age 38)
- Occupations: Producer; creative director; screenwriter
- Years active: 2006–present
- Known for: Bigg Boss 11; Bigg Boss 13; Bigg Boss 14; MTV Ace of Space
- Family: Siddharth Gupta (brother)

Vikas Gupta (born 7 May 1988) is an Indian television producer, creative director, screenwriter and host. He is known for participating in Bigg Boss 11, Bigg Boss 13 and hosting MTV Ace of Space.

== Life ==
Gupta was born on 7 May 1988. He hails from Dehradun. His brother, Siddharth Gupta, is an actor as well as a model.

In June 2020, Gupta came out as bisexual in an Instagram post. Gupta is also one of the directors of an NGO called Lost Boy Welfare Association that helps poor children.

== Career ==
Gupta started working at the age of 17 in Balaji Telefilms as an actor He was the creative head of Ekta Kapoor’s Balaji Telefilms for shows like Mahabharat, Kyunki Saas Bhi Kabhi Bahu Thi, Kis Desh Mein Hai Meraa Dil and Pyaar Tune Kya Kiya. Later, he started his own production studio Lost Boy Productions which has created popular television series like Gumrah: End of Innocence, Warrior High, Kaisi Yeh Yaariaan, V The Serial, Yeh Hai Aashiqui and MTV Webbed. Gupta has also been the youngest programming head of MTV India.

In October 2017, Gupta participated in Colors TV's Bigg Boss 11 where he emerged as the second runner up of the season. Due to his performance, he was given the title of “Mastermind” on the show. In 2017, he produced Class of 2017 on ALTBalaji.

In 2018, he hosted IIFA Buzz in Thailand for IIFA Awards 2018 on Voot. Gupta also created and hosted his own reality show titled Ace of Space on MTV India.

In 2019, he entered Bigg Boss 13 as a proxy.

In 2019, he participated in Colors TV's Fear Factor: Khatron Ke Khiladi 9 in Argentina. He was disqualified from the show Next, he created Puncch Beat for ALTBalaji. In March, he reunited with his co-contestants Bharti Singh, Aly Goni, Harsh Limbachiyaa among others to be a part of Khatra Khatra Khatra. In May 2019, Gupta created anthology series Yeh Ishq Nahi Aasaan for Dangal TV. In August 2019, he returned as the host of MTV India's Ace of Space 2.

In February 2020, he created Class of 2020 for ALTBalaji. In November, he participated in Colors TV's Bigg Boss 14, this time as a challenger. When co-contestant Arshi Khan involved Gupta's family in a fight, he pushed her and was thus expelled from the show. He re-entered the show soon after.

== Filmography ==
=== Television ===
Year	Title	Producer	Writer	Creative Director
2005–2008	Kyunki... Saas Bhi Kabhi Bahu Thi ...			Yes
2006–2008	Kahaani Hamaaray Mahaabhaarat Ki			Yes
2008–2010	Kis Desh Mein Hai Meraa Dil			Yes
2009	Kitani Mohabbat Hai			Yes
2010–2011	Kitani Mohabbat Hai 2			Yes
2012	The Serial	Yes	Yes	
2012–2016	Gumrah End of Innocence	Yes	Yes	
2013–2014	MTV Webbed	Yes	Yes	
2014–2016	Yeh Hai Aashiqui	Yes	Yes	Yes
2014–2017	Pyaar Tune Kya Kiya	Yes	Yes	
2014–2015	Kaisi Yeh Yaariaan		Yes	
2014–2015	MTV Fanaah	Yes	Yes	
2015	MTV Warrior High	Yes		
2015	Code Red	Yes		Yes
2015	Talaash	Yes		Yes
2015	2019	Yeh Ishq Nahi Aasan	Yes	Yes

=== Web series ===
- 2017: Class of 2017
- 2019: Puncch Beat
- 2020: Class of 2020

=== Television ===
Year	Title	Role	Notes	Ref.
2015	Bad Company	Host		
2017–2018	Bigg Boss 11	Contestant	2nd runner-up	
2018	IIFA Buzz	Host		
2018	Ace of Space 1	Host		
2018	Bigg Boss 12	Himself	Guest	
2019	Fear Factor: Khatron Ke Khiladi 9	Contestant	Disqualified	
2019	Khatra Khatra Khatra	Himself	Guest	
2019	Kitchen Champion 5	Himself	Guest	
2019	Ace of Space 2	Host		
2019	Bigg Boss 13	Contestant	Proxy for Devoleena Bhattacharjee	
2020	Mujhse Shaadi Karoge	Host	Grand Finale	
2020	Ladies vs Gentlemen	Panelist		
2020–2021	Bigg Boss 14	Contestant	Challenger	

== Awards and nominations ==
Year	Award	Category	Work	Result	Ref.
2012	Indian Television Academy Awards	Best Serial	Gumrah End of Innocence	Won	
2013	Indian Telly Awards	Best Story Writer	Gumrah End of Innocence	Nominated	
