= Bigg Boss (Hindi TV series) season 11 =

Indian reality show (2017)

Bigg Boss
- Season 11
- Presented by: Salman Khan
- No. of days: 106
- No. of housemates: 19
- Winner: Shilpa Shinde
- Runner-up: Hina Khan
- No. of episodes: 107

Release
- Original network: Colors TV
- Original release: 1 October 2017 – 14 January 2018

Season chronology
- ← Previous; Season 10 Next → Season 12

Bigg Boss 11, also known as Bigg Boss 11: Padosi Bajayenge Barah, is the 11th season of Indian reality TV series Bigg Boss, which aired on Colors TV. Salman Khan returned to host the show for the 8th time. It premiered on 1 October 2017. The grand finale of the show, took place on 14 January 2018 when Shilpa Shinde emerged as the winner and Hina Khan as the runner-up.The season achieved strong ratings and was considered a success at that point in the show's run.

This was the second season of Bigg Boss to appear on Voot. Like the previous season, viewers are offered extension properties such as Unseen Undekha, Cutless and a new weekend special, Bigg Buzz. For the first time, the voting could only be done via Voot.

== Housemates status ==
Sr	Housemate	Day entered	Day exited	Status
1	Shilpa	Day 1	Day 105	Winner
2	Hina	Day 1	Day 105	1st runner-up
3	Vikas	Day 1	Day 105	2nd runner-up
4	Puneesh	Day 1	Day 105	3rd runner-up
5	Aakash	Day 1	Day 102	Evicted
6	Luv	Day 1	Day 98	Evicted
7	Priyank	Day 1	Day 6	Ejected
7	Priyank	Day 26	Day 91	Evicted
8	Arshi	Day 1	Day 83	Evicted
9	Hiten	Day 1	Day 77	Evicted by Housemates
10	Bandgi	Day 1	Day 63	Evicted
11	Sapna	Day 1	Day 56	Evicted
12	Benafsha	Day 1	Day 49	Evicted
13	Mehjabi	Day 1	Day 42	Evicted
14	Sabyasachi	Day 1	Day 42	Evicted
15	Pooja	Day 21	Day 35	Evicted
16	Jyoti	Day 1	Day 28	Evicted
17	Lucinda	Day 1	Day 15	Evicted by Housemates
18	Shivani	Day 1	Day 14	Evicted
19	Zubair	Day 1	Day 7	Ejected

== Production ==
=== Eye Logo ===
The eye had two colours this time - white and yellow. The lens was separately situated at the center of the eye. The eye was sliced into two parts diagonally having cracks in both sides.

=== House ===
The house had a "padosi" theme which referred to neighbour in English. New sections called Aakhara (activity area) and Kalkothri (jail) were introduced for the first time.

== Housemates ==
The participants in the order of appearance and entered in house are:

=== Original entrants ===
- Hiten Tejwani – Television and film actor. Hiten is remembered for his roles in Kutumb, Kyunki Saas Bhi Kabhi Bahu Thi, Kasautii Zindagii Kay, Pavitra Rishta and Gangaa.
- Luv Tyagi – Model and civil engineer.
- Mehjabi Siddiqui – Housewife.
- Lucinda Nicholas – Australian model, actress and yoga instructor. She made her debut in the Bollywood film Boss featured Akshay Kumar and Yo Yo Honey Singh in the popular song "Party All Night". In 2016, she played a cameo role in Ekta Kapoor's show Pardes Mein Hai Mera Dil.
- Sabyasachi Satpathy – TV host, dancer, designer.
- Sapna Choudhary – A famous Haryanvi dancer.
- Sshivani Durga – Self-styled God woman.
- Priyank Sharma – Dancer, model and reality TV star. Priyank is known for participating in MTV Roadies and MTV Splitsvilla.
- Benafsha Soonawalla – MTV VJ, model. Benafsha participated in MTV Roadies.
- Akash Dadlani – Rapper.
- Jyoti Kumari – Student.
- Bandgi Kalra – Model and software engineer.
- Arshi Khan – Model, actress and dancer.
- Hina Khan – Television actress. Hina is known for her role as Akshara Singhania in Yeh Rishta Kya Kehlata Hai. She is the first runner-up in Fear Factor: Khatron Ke Khiladi (2017).
- Puneesh Sharma – Reality TV star. He is the winner of the reality show Sarkaar Ki Duniya.
- Vikas Gupta – Producer. Vikas is known as the head of channels MTV India and &TV. He was also the head creative producer of the show Kis Desh Mein Hai Meraa Dil.
- Shilpa Shinde – Television actress. Shilpa is known for her role as Angoori Bhabhi in Bhabiji Ghar Par Hain!
- Zubair Khan – Director.

=== Wild card entrants ===
- Dhinchak Pooja – Singer.

== Twists ==
The theme of the season was called the 'Padosi theme' where four housemates will be seen in another house and give tough tasks. On the premiere night, Lucinda Nicholas, Mehjabi Siddiqui, Sabyasachi Satpathy and Luv Tyagi were introduced as the four neighbours. They had to re-enact as real neighbors upon entering the main house to gain powers.

=== Housemates allotment ===
Housemate	Week 1	Week 2	Week 3		
Housemate	Days 1–14		Day 14	Day 15	Day 16
Housemate	^{1}	^{2},	^{3}		
Akash	Main House		Padosi theme ended	Main House	
Arshi	Main House		Padosi theme ended	Main House	
Bandgi	Main House		Padosi theme ended	Main House	
Benafsha	Main House		Padosi theme ended	Main House	
Hina	Main House		Padosi theme ended	Main House	
Hiten	Main House		Padosi theme ended	Main House	
Luv	Padosi		Padosi theme ended	Main House	
Mehjabi	Padosi		Padosi theme ended	Main House	
Puneesh	Main House		Padosi theme ended	Main House	
Sabyasachi	Padosi		Padosi theme ended	Main House	
Sapna	Main House		Padosi theme ended	Main House	
Shilpa	Main House		Padosi theme ended	Main House	
Vikas	Main House		Padosi theme ended	Main House	
Lucinda	Padosi		Padosi theme ended	Main House	
Shivani	Main House		Padosi theme ended		
Zubair	Main House		Padosi theme ended		
Priyank	Main House		Padosi theme ended		

- ^1: Lucinda, Mehjabi, Sabyasachi and Luv had powers to nominate and save a housemate.
- ^2: All four of the Padosi's entered the main house.
- ^3: Housemates had to evict one Padosi and therefore Lucinda was evicted.

=== Sultani Akhada ===
The season introduced a new segment called "Sultani Akhada" on the premiere night. In this segment, two housemates compete against each other in tasks during the "Weekend Ka Vaar" with Salman Khan. The competition consists of two rounds. The first round is a debate between the two housemates, and the second round is a light wrestling match. The housemate who scores the most points through both rounds is declared the winner. The final Sultani Akhada of the season took place in Week 14 on Day 98.

Weeks	1	2	3	4	5	6	7	8	9	10	11	12	13	14
Weeks	Day 7	Day 14	Day 20	Day 27	Day 35	Day 42	Day 49	Day 55	Day 63	Day 70	Day 77	Day 83	Day 91	Day 98
Participants for Sultani Akhada	Arshi; Sapna	Arshi; Shilpa	Arshi; Hina	Pooja; Sapna	Akash; Priyank	Vikas; Priyank	Shilpa; Hina	Akash; Puneesh	Luv; Puneesh	Arshi; Shilpa	Arshi/Vikas; Hina/Priyank	Luv; Priyank	Hina/Vikas/Akash; Shilpa/Puneesh/Luv	Akash; Puneesh
Winner	Sapna	Arshi	No; Winner	Sapna	Priyank	Vikas	Shilpa	Puneesh	Luv	Arshi	Arshi/Vikas	Priyank	Team Hina	Puneesh

== Guest appearances ==
Week	Day	Guest(s)	Purpose of visit	Ref(s)
1	Grand Premiere	Varun Dhawan, Jacqueline Fernandez & Taapsee Pannu	To promote their film Judwaa 2
1	Grand Premiere	Gauri Pradhan	To support husband Hiten Tejwani
1	Grand Premiere	Ekta Kapoor	To support friend Vikas Gupta
1	Grand Premiere	Anita Hassanandani	To support friend Vikas Gupta
1	Grand Premiere	Salma Agha	To support friend Vikas Gupta
1	Grand Premiere	Karan Patel	To support friend Vikas Gupta
1	Grand Premiere	Karan Kundrra	To support friend Vikas Gupta
1	Day 5	Sweta Singh	As panellists on Friday Ka Faisla
1	Day 5	Pritam Singh	As panellists on Friday Ka Faisla
1	Day 5	Malishka Mendonsa	As panellists on Friday Ka Faisla
1	Day 7	Rohit Shetty	To promote their film Golmaal Again
1	Day 7	Ajay Devgan	To promote their film Golmaal Again
1	Day 7	Parineeti Chopra	To promote their film Golmaal Again
1	Day 7	Tabu Hashmi	To promote their film Golmaal Again
1	Day 7	Tusshar Kapoor	To promote their film Golmaal Again
1	Day 7	Shreyas Talpade	To promote their film Golmaal Again
1	Day 7	Kunal Khemu	To promote their film Golmaal Again
2	Day 12	Manu Punjabi & Sargun Mehta	As panellists on Friday Ka Faisla
2	Day 14	Ravi Dubey & Rithvik Dhanjani	Special appearances
3	Day 21	Arjun Bijlani	Special appearances
3	Day 21	Jasmin Bhasin	Special appearances
3	Day 21	Rashami Desai	Special appearances
3	Day 21	Rubina Dilaik	Special appearances
3	Day 21	Avika Gor & Meghna Malik	To promote their show Laado 2 – Veerpur Ki Mardani
3	Day 21	Aditya Narayan & Asha Negi	To promote their show Entertainment Ki Raat
4	Day 27	Gauahar Khan	For special immunity task
4	Day 27	Rohit Shetty, Ajay Devgan, Parineeti Chopra & Tabu Hashmi	To celebrate the success of their film Golmaal Again
4	Day 28	Gaurav Gera	Special appearance
4	Day 28	Manu Punjabi & Lopamudra Raut	Special appearances as panellists
4	Day 28	Balraj Syal, Dipika Kakar & Divyansh Dwivedi	To promote their show Entertainment Ki Raat
5	Day 35	Tanishaa Mukerji, Karanvir Bohra & Sweta Singh	To give immunity task
6	Day 41	Kapil Sharma	To promote his film Firangi
6	Day 42	Vidya Balan	To promote her film Tumhari Sulu
7	Day 48	Arbaaz Khan & Sunny Leone	To promote their film Tera Intezaar
7	Day 49	Deepika Padukone	To promote her film Padmaavat
8	Day 56	Remo D'Souza, Jacqueline Fernandez, Daisy Shah, Bobby Deol, Saqib Saleem & Ramesh S. Taurani	To promote their film Race 3
9	Days 62–63	Katrina Kaif	To promote her film Tiger Zinda Hai
10	Days 67–68	Shriniwas Sharma	To support his son Puneesh Sharma
10	Days 67–68	Mohammad Arman Khan	To support his daughter Arshi Khan
10	Days 67–68	Geeta Shinde	To support her daughter Shilpa Shinde
10	Days 67–68	Divya Agarwal	To confront and breakup with boyfriend Priyank Sharma
10	Days 67–68	Sharda Gupta	To support her son Vikas Gupta
10	Days 67–68	Sunita Dadlani	To support her son Akash Dadlani
10	Days 67–68	Rocky Jaiswal	To support his girlfriend Hina Khan
10	Days 67–68	Gauri Pradhan	To support her husband Hiten Tejwani
10	Day 69	Karan Patel, Karishma Tanna & Rohan Mehra	Special appearances
10	Day 70	Pulkit Samrat, Richa Chadda, Manjot Singh & Varun Sharma	To promote their film Fukrey Returns
11	Day 77	Mouni Roy	Special appearances
12	Day 84	Mika Singh	Special appearances
13	Day 86	Sunita Dadlani (Akash's mother)	Entered Padosi house for a task
13	Day 86	Sharda Gupta (Vikas's mother)	Entered Padosi house for a task
13	Day 86	Vandana Sharma (Priyank's mother)	Entered Padosi house for a task
13	Day 86	Ashutosh Shinde (Shilpa's brother)	Entered Padosi house for a task
13	Day 86	Rocky Jaiswal (Hina's boyfriend)	Entered Padosi house for a task
13	Day 86	Bandgi Kalra (Puneesh's girlfriend)	Entered Padosi house for a task
13	Day 91	Balraj Syal	Special appearance
14	Day 97	Rani Mukerji	To promote her film Hichki
14	Day 98	Manoj Bajpayee, Sidharth Malhotra & Rakul Preet Singh	To promote their film Aiyaary
15	Day 100	Arshi Khan	To give task to housemates
15	Day 105	Akshay Kumar	To promote his film Padman
15	Day 105	Dheeraj Sarna & Krystle D'Souza	To promote their show Belan Wali Bahu

== Weekly summary ==
Week 1	Entrances	Akash, Arshi, Bandgi, Benafsha, Hina, Hiten, Jyoti, Priyank, Puneesh, Shilpa, Sapna, Sshivani, Vikas and Zubair entered the Bigg Boss house on Day 1. Lucinda, Luv, Mehjabi and Sabyasachi entered the Bigg Boss Padosi house on Day 1.
Week 1	Nominations	Bigg Boss announced the first nomination of the season (Open Nominations), where every housemate has to take two names who they want to nominate. Bigg Boss also says whom they want to nominate, they have to put stamp on their faces and nominate them. Hina, Jyoti, Shilpa and Zubair were nominated in that process. Later Bigg Boss announced that Neighbor got the special power where they can save one nominated contestant and nominate two other contestants. Then the Neighbor saved Hina and nominated Arshi and Bandgi. As a result, Arshi, Bandgi, Jyoti, Shilpa and Zubair were nominated for the following week.
Week 1	Tasks	BB Farm; The housemates were given a set of tasks, which they had to complete on/before the time given by Padosis.
Week 1	Result	Winner - Lucinda, Mehjabi, Luv and Sabyasachi
Week 1	Reward	Padosis got the Luxury Budget, all for themselves.
Week 1	Punishments	Jail; Housemate had to mutually decide any three housemates who will have to stay a night in the Jail. Housemates choose Shilpa, Arshi and Akash. But Padosis had the power to replace one housemate, they chose to save Arshi and replace her with Zubair.
Week 1	Other Tasks	Padosis were given a Secret Task to make up a fake story about them relating to a man called M.P.Siddiqui, who died.
Week 1	Exit	Priyank Sharma was ejected from the house on Day 6 due to engaging in a fight with Akash and physically pushing him, violating the rules of the house. Zubair Khan was evicted from the house by the public vote on Day 7.
Week 2	Entrances	Padosis were moved from the Padosis House to the Main House, now will continue as housemates.
Week 2	Nominations	In this Nominations, housemates had to save one housemate (Open Nominations). Housemates got a chance to campaign for votes. Every time Bigg Boss announces the housemate's name, they will have to campaign and when the buzzer sounds, housemates cast their vote to save. Hina, Sapna, Sshivani and Vikas were nominated in that process. Later Padosis got a special power to directly nominate one housemate. As a result, Hina, Jyoti, Sapna, Sshivani and Vikas were nominated in that process.
Week 2	Tasks	Raja Rani ki Kahani; Hiten was the King (Raja), Arshi and Shilpa were Queens(Ranis). The Queens have to win King's heart, where King had to find out which one of those Queens is the good Queen and the bad Queen. Later Bigg Boss will ask the King, who is the bad one and who is the good one. Then if the King correctly guesses the good Queen, he and the good Queen will become contenders for Captaincy. But if the King guesses it wrong, two Queens will become contenders for Captaincy. Other Housemates have been divided into two teams, one for each Queen. In Queen Arshi's team were Vikas, Puneesh, Lucinda, Jyoti, Hina and Sabyasachi and in Queen Shilpa's team were Akash, Luv, Mehjabi, Bandgi, Sshivani, Sapna and Benafsha. These teams will have to build walls for the Palace in their color of blocks. Arshi's were Red blocks and Shilpa's were Blue blocks. The winning team will also become contenders for Captaincy. This task will affect next week's Nominations. Later Bigg Boss called the two Queens to the Confession Room to reveal who is the bad Queen and the good Queen. Shilpa was the good Queen and Arshi was the bad Queen.
Week 2	Result	Winner - Team Arshi
Week 2	Result	King Hiten
Week 2	Captaincy	Housemates had to mutually decide two housemates who will compete for the 1st Captaincy. They chose Puneesh and Hina. Later Padosis got a special power to swap 1 contender. They swapped Hina with Vikas.
Week 2	Other Tasks	Captaincy Task; Puneesh and Vikas were hanged in the air, where other housemates had to sacrifice they personal stuff/things in the weighting machine, which is kept in front of the contenders, the housemate to reach 15 kg will become the first Captain of the Season.
Week 2	Result	Winner - Vikas
Week 2	Punishments	Jail; The Captain Vikas had to decide one housemate to go to the Jail, he chose Hina. Then Padosis had to mutually decide one housemate to go to the Jail, they chose Arshi. Then Housemate had to mutually decide one housemate to go to the Jail, they chose Sapna.
Week 2	Exit	Sshivani Durga was evicted from the house by the public vote on Day 14.
Week 3	Surprise; Elimination	Lucinda got ejected from the house by the housemates. Housemates were given a task to vote any one padosi to be ejected from the house because they lost the secret task given by Bigg Boss. By a vote of eight votes for Lucinda and six votes for Luv, Lucinda got ejected on Day 15.
Week 3	Nominations	Captain Vikas is given a special power to nominate any seven housemates. And housemates had to nominate two housemates from those seven housemates. As a result, Hina, Sapna, Puneesh, Akash and Luv got nominated. However, There were no evictions for this week.
Week 3	Tasks	Jo mud gaya, who ud gaya (If you turn, then you are out): For this task garden area was turned into a Junkyard. Housemates were divided into 2 teams: Team Puneesh: Arshi, Akash, Luv, Bandgi, Jyoti and Shilpa Team Vikas: Hina, Mehjabi, Hiten, Benafsha, Sabyasachi and Sapna: The two teams will have to put they head on the stand and stand for the longest, whereas the other team will have to try removing their head from the stand, without touching them.
Week 3	Result	Winner - Team Vikas
Week 3	Captaincy	Housemates had to mutually decide two housemates from the winning team (Team Vikas) who will compete for the next Captaincy. They chose Hina and Sapna. Hina and Sapna had to choose one other housemate each to play for them. Hina chose Hiten and Sapna chose Puneesh. These two will be sitting in the box and other housemates will to put sand in it, and Hiten and Puneesh will remove the sand from the box. The box with the least sand will become the next Captain.
Week 3	Result	Winner - Hina
Week 3	Punishments	On Day 16, Vikas was sent to Jail because he hit Puneesh during the luxury budget task and thus violating the rules of the House. He is also fired from captaincy and not allowed to become a captain for the show. On Day 17, Housemates had to mutually decide two worst performers, who deserves Jail Punishment. They chose Arshi and Jyoti.
Week 3	Entrances	On Day 21, Pooja entered as the first Wild Card. On Day 26, Priyank re-entered the house after ejection.
Week 4	Nominations	Captain Hina and Wild Card Pooja were safe from nominations. In this Nominations Bigg Boss himself Nominated 6 housemates, who are the victims of not following the House Rules. Bigg Boss nominated Bandgi, Shilpa, Arshi, Vikas, Mehjabi and Puneesh. But they also given a chance to save themselves. There were two friendship walls in the garden area. One by one Bigg Boss will announce one nominated housemate and one save housemate, these two will have to stand to either sides of the wall. Nominated housemate will be holding the save housemate's hand, if the nominated housemate leaves the save housemate's they will be save and the save housemate will be nominated, but if the nominated housemate keeps holding the save housemate's hand until the buzzer, then the nominated housemate will get nominated.: Arshi and Benafsha; Shilpa and Hiten; Bandgi and Luv; Puneesh and Sapna; Vikas and Sabyasachi; Mehjabi and Jyoti; Akash and Hina; As a result, Benafsha, Shilpa, Luv, Sapna, Vikas, Jyoti and Akash were nominated.
Week 4	Tasks	Kul ja sim sim(Open up!); Housemates were divided into two teams Team Red and Team Blue and will stay in the garden are which was transformed into a Jungle. The main house will be a den, whenever the sound "Kul ja sim sim" is heard, the door of the main house will be open for five mins, any one housemate from each team can enter. But once they enter, they will be out of the Task. At the end of the task, the team with more number of housemates will win the task. Luv was not part of the Task but had to see that not any rules of the house are being violated, if did he himself can forcefully send housemates into the house, therefore removing from the Task. Team Red: Hina, Benafsha, Mehjabi, Sabyasachi, Pooja, Shilpa and Hiten Team Blue: Akash, Puneesh, Vikas, Jyoti, Arshi, Sapna and Bandgi
Week 4	Result	Winner - Blue Team
Week 4	Punishments	Jail; Housemates had to mutually decide 1 worst performer from the Red Team, who deserves Jail Punishment. They chose Pooja. Captain Hina had to decide two housemates to go to the Jail, she chose Akash and Arshi. Luxury budget = 0 Bigg Boss took away all the luxury budget points, for: 1. Sleeping before lights out.; 2. Throwing water on the mics, even after constant telling.; 3. Talking in English.; 4. Puneesh, Bandgi and Arshi discussing nominations.
Week 4	Other Tasks	Sapna ki Adaalat (Sapna's Court); Captain Hina gets a chance to be the Captain for another week, Hina will have to answer to the questions asked by the other housemates. At the end Sapna will decide if Hina deserves Captaincy for another week. Pooja's Viral Song; To get back their Luxury badget, Pooja had to create a viral song on Bigg Boss House and the housemates.
Week 4	Result	Sapna ki Adaalat (Sapna's Court); Sapna decided that she does not deserve Captaincy for another week.
Week 4	Result	Pooja's Viral Song; Pooja successfully made a viral video.
Week 4	Exits	On Day 28, Jyoti was evicted from the house by the public vote.
Week 4	Captaincy	Housemates had to mutually decide three housemates from the winning team (Blue Team) who will compete for the next Captaincy. They chose Luv, Bandgi and Jyoti. These three will be tied to a portable rod. The housemate staying the longest will become the next Captain. As Jyoti got evicted during the task, she was replaced by Sapna.
Week 4	Result	Winner - Luv
Week 5	Nominations	Captain Luv was safe from nominations. In this Nominations Bigg Boss paired up housemates and were called to the Confession Room. In which, they had to mutually decide which one of them to be nominated. If they do not come to a decision, both of them will get nominated. And they are not allowed to say anything about what happened in the Confession Room. These were the pairs: Sabyasachi and Mehjabi (they nominated Sabyasachi); Shilpa and Akash (they nominated Shilpa); Priyank and Hiten (they nominated Hiten); Vikas and Sapna (they nominated Sapna); Hina and Puneesh (they nominated Hina); Arshi and Pooja (they nominated Pooja); Benafsha and Bandgi (they didn't come to a decision); As a result, Sabyasachi, Shilpa, Hiten, Sapna, Hina, Pooja, Benafsha and Bandgi. Later Bigg Boss himself nominated Priyank for breaking the rules. (more in this week's Punishments)
Week 5	Tasks	BB Cushion Factory; Shilpa and Vikas were the businessmen of the factories. Other housemates were the workers of these factories, it was up to them to decide for which factory they wanted to work for. Throughout the Task, Bigg Boss will give orders, where businessmen have to hire workers and deliver the order before the other factory. Businessmen have to give salary for the work they have done. At the end of the Task, the worker and the businessman with the highest points will win. Vikas was given a secret task, that if he wins the task, the punishment for not becoming Captain for the rest of the season will be removed.
Week 5	Result	Winner - Benafsha and Vikas
Week 5	Punishments	On Day 29, Bigg Boss nominated Priyank for talking about outer world and giving information to some of the housemates and during the Nominations, which was supposed to be a secret process, he appealed for votes for Hiten in the garden's camera, right after leaving the Confession Room. Jail; On Day 32, Housemates had to mutually decide two worst performers in the Luxury Budget Task, who deserves Jail Punishment. They chose Vikas and Mehjabi. Captain Luv had to decide 1 housemate to go to the Jail; he chose Arshi.
Week 5	Captaincy	Benafsha as the winner of the luxury budget task became the 1st contender. And Housemates had to mutually decide 2 housemates who were the best performers, who will compete for the next Captaincy. They chose Hiten and Puneesh. These 3 will be ride the cycle in the garden area and at times they had to drink a glass of water. The housemate staying the longest will become the next Captain.
Week 5	Result	Winner - Puneesh
Week 5	Other Tasks	Revealing of Secrets; Housemates had to tell 1 of their biggest secret, which they have not revealed to anybody and not in the Bigg Boss house. This task was judged by few Panelists. The housemate chosen by the panelists will get Immunity in the next Nominations.
Week 5	Result	Shilpa won the task and was Immune from the Nominations.
Week 5	Exits	On Day 35, Pooja was evicted from the house by the public vote.
Week 6	Nominations	Captain Puneesh is given a special power to nominate any 7 housemates. And housemates had to nominate 2 housemates from those 7 housemates. As a result, Priyank, Benafsha, Sabyasachi, Sapna and Mehjabi got nominated.
Week 6	Tasks	For this task garden area was turned into a space. Housemates were the astronauts, who were struck in the Spaceship. The housemate who gets down the spaceship will be out of the task and the prize money on their name will be deducted from the winner's prize money. On the sound of the buzzer, the 1st housemate to get down will become contender for the next Captaincy.: 1st Buzzer: Sabyasachi – 70,000; 2nd Buzzer: Bandgi – 1,75,000; 3rd Buzzer: Akash – 2,50,000; Arshi – 3,10,000; Shilpa – 8,00,000; Mehjabi – 2,75,000; Mid-way: Benafsha – 10,000; Priyank: 60,000; Hina – 7,00,000; Vikas – 1,50,000; Luv – 1,00,000; Sapna – 11,00,000; Hiten – 10,00,000
Week 6	Result	Housemates were unsuccessful and Prize Money became ₹. 0.
Week 6	Punishments	On Day 39, Benafsha was sent to Jail because she pulled Akash's hair during a heated conversation and thus violating the rules of the House. Jail; Housemates had to mutually decide 2 worst performers, who deserves Jail Punishment. They could not come to a mutual decision. Then Bigg Boss gave the 3 contenders (Sabyasachi, Bandgi and Akash) for the next Captaincy, the chance to mutually decide 2 worst performers, and send to the Jail. They chose Hina and Hiten.
Week 6	Captaincy	Sabyasachi, Bandgi and Akash were the contender for the Captaincy. Each of them had their own nest and other housemates had an egg each and the 3 housemates in the Jail (Benafsha, Hina and Hiten) had only 1 egg. Housemates had to give their eggs to the housemate of their choice.
Week 6	Captaincy	Captain Sabyasachi got a special power to let 1 housemate from the Jail.
Week 6	Result	Winner - Sabyasachi
Week 6	Other Tasks	Garnier Men All Clear Task; Housemates are paired by, with 1 male and 1 female housemate. The male housemate will have to go through an obstacle course to win the title of Garnier Man of the series. The female housemate will wash the male housemate's face with Garnier face wash.: Priyank and Benafsha; Puneesh and Bandgi; Akash and Arshi
Week 6	Result	Time taken: Priyank and Benafsha – 56 second 94 millisecond; Puneesh and Bandgi – 45 second 59 millisecond; Akash and Arshi – 40 second 78 millisecond
Week 6	Result	Winner - Akash and Arshi
Week 6	Exit	On Day 42, Mehjabi and Sabyasachi were evicted from the house by the public vote.
Week 7	Nominations	Telephone Task; Bigg Boss set a telephone on a life-guard chair(high-top chair) in garden area. Whoever picked up the telephone would be nominated. To save from nomination they had to do task by other housemate. Benafsha was already nominated due to pulling Akash's hair last week and violating house rules.: At first, Hina picked up the telephone. Bigg Boss gave her a task where Luv had to tattoo "ZERO" with mehendi on his forehead, which he successfully did. However, Bigg Boss pull back the decision due to removing the ZERO label on the forehead as forbidden not to apply any makeup or try to clean it.; As a result, Hina, Benafsha and Sapna got nominated.
Week 7	Tasks	BB Dino Park; Puneesh, Luv and Vikas were the dinosaurs and were locked in the cage placed in the garden. Other housemates played the role of the Park staff. The photos of the staff members are kept in the garden. When they hear the dinosaur sound (buzzer), the first dinosaur to come out of the cage will get to eliminate one housemate from becoming contenders of Captaincy by crushing their photo. The last photo left will become one of the contenders for Captaincy and the dinosaur who comes out first for the most times will also become contender for Captaincy.: 1st Buzzer: Luv – Shilpa; 2nd Buzzer: Luv – Arshi; 3rd Buzzer: Vikas – Hina; 4th Buzzer: Luv – Akash; 5th Buzzer: Puneesh – Benafsha; 6th Buzzer: Puneesh – Sapna; 7th Buzzer: Puneesh – Priyank; 8th Buzzer: Vikas – Hiten
Week 7	Result	Winner - Bandgi
Week 7	Captaincy	Bandgi, Puneesh and Luv competed. They were given a bowl of water. The housemate with the most water at the end of the task will become the new Captain.
Week 7	Result	Winner - Bandgi
Week 7	Punishments	On Day 44, Hina hid Luv's ZERO tattoo with make up, which was against the rules of the nomination process. Therefore, Bigg Boss pull back the decision to save Hina for this eviction. Jail; Housemates had to mutually decide two worst performers in the Luxury Budget Task, who deserves Jail Punishment. They chose Shilpa and Arshi. Captain Bandgi had to special power to save 1 housemate from going to Jail from the 2 housemates chosen by other housemates and had to decide 2 other housemates to go to Jail. She saved Arshi and chose Akash and Luv to go to Jail.
Week 7	Exits	On Day 49, Benafsha was evicted from the house by the public vote.
Week 8	Nominations	Appy Fizz feel the fizz Nominations; For this Nominations, there was Appy Fizz safe zone in the garden. The members with the membership at the end of six buzzers will be save from this week's nominations. At once only four housemates can have the membership. At first, Bigg Boss gave Hina, Vikas, Hiten and Arshi were given membership. After every buzzer the housemates with the membership will have to mutually decide which one of them should leave the Appy Fizz safe zone and then they will decide which other housemate to take their place in the safe zone. Akash used his Safety Shield to safe himself from this Nominations. Captain Bandgi had a special power to save one unsafe housemate, she chose Puneesh. As a result, Hina, Sapna, Priyank and Shilpa were nominated.
Week 8	Tasks	Bigg Boss Court; Living area was transformed into a Court. Arshi and Hiten were a couple who want divorce. Arshi family were Puneesh and Vikas – brothers, Shilpa was her mother and Vikas was Lawyer of Arshi. Hiten family were Hina – sister, Luv and Akash – brothers and Hina was Lawyer of Hiten. Sapana and Bandgi were the judges of the Court. After every session, the judges had to decide which one of them proved to be true.: 1st Session: Vikas; 2nd Session: Hina; 3rd Session: Hina
Week 8	Result	Judges Bandgi and Sapna didn't come to a conclusion and therefore lost the Luxury Budget Task.
Week 8	Captaincy	Housemates had to mutually decide 5 best performers in the Luxury Budget Task. They chose Shilpa, Arshi, Hiten, Akash and Vikas. The photos of the 5 contenders were kept in the garden area and a platform with a bottle of black spray. The task will have 4 buzzers in total, for every buzzer the first non-contender housemate to stand on the platform will get to eliminate 1 contender from becoming the Captain by spraying on that contender's photo. At the end of 4 buzzers, the housemate's photo left without black spray will become the new Captain.
Week 8	Result	Winner - Hiten
Week 8	Punishments	Jail; On Day 54, Housemates had to mutually decide 3 worst performers in the Luxury Budget Task, who deserves Jail Punishment. They chose Sapna, Akash and Bandgi.
Week 8	Exits	On Day 55, Sapna was evicted from the house by the public vote.
Week 9	Nominations	Every housemate had to nominate 2 housemates. As a result, Luv, Puneesh and Bandgi were nominated.
Week 9	Tasks	Gulliver and the Lilliputs; Housemates were divided into 2 teams Team A and Team B. At a time, Lilliputs will have to torture 1 of the Gullivers and forcing them to ring the bell and leave the task. Vikas and Priyank were not part of the Task but had to see that not any rules of the house are being violated. Team A: Hina, Akash, Luv and Arshi. Team B: Shilpa, Hiten, Puneesh, and Bandgi.: 1st Day: Team A tortured Team B.; 2nd Day: Team B tortured Team A.
Week 9	Result	Winner - Team B
Week 9	Punishments	Jail; On Day 60, Housemates had to mutually decide 3 worst performers in the Luxury Budget Task, who deserves Jail Punishment. They chose Arshi, Puneesh and Bandgi.
Week 9	Captaincy	Vikas and Priyank successfully did their job in the Luxury Budget Task. They became the 2 contenders for the Captaincy.
Week 9	Result	Winner - Vikas
Week 9	Exits	On Day 63, Bandgi was evicted from the house by the public vote.
Week 10	Nominations	Every housemate had to save 1 housemate. With 0 votes to get save, Luv and Akash were nominated. But captain Vikas got a special power to replace a nominee, he saved Luv and nominated Shilpa. As a result, Akash and Shilpa were nominated for eviction. However, voting lines are closed for this week therefore, no eliminations took place for the second time.
Week 10	Task	BB Day Care; In the beginning all housemate will be contenders for Captaincy. After each buzzer, 1 housemate will lose his/her Captaincy. Garden was transformed into Children's Park and Baby Day Care. Each housemate will have the baby doll of another housemate and have to babysit. Housemates have to take care of their babies. When buzzer heard, housemates have to rush into the Day Care with their baby and will have to park in 1 of slots there. The housemate left with no slot to park will be eliminated from the task and the baby doll of that housemate will lose their Captaincy.: 1st Buzzer: Priyank fails to place the Baby at the parking slot thus Puneesh falls out of Captaincy. Priyank becomes Moderator (Sanchalak) of the task.; 2nd Buzzer: Arshi fails to place the Baby at the parking slot thus Shilpa falls out of Captaincy.; 3rd Buzzer: Akash fails to place the Baby at the parking slot thus Hiten falls out of Captaincy.; 4th Buzzer: Hina fails to place the Baby at the parking slot thus Akash falls out of Captaincy.; 5th Buzzer: Shilpa fails to place the Baby at the parking slot thus Priyank falls out of Captaincy.; 6th Buzzer: Luv fails to place the Baby at the parking slot thus Vikas falls out of Captaincy.; 7th Buzzer: Puneesh fails to place the Baby at the parking slot thus Luv falls out of Captaincy.; 8th Buzzer: Hiten fails to place the Baby at the parking slot thus Hina falls out of Captaincy.
Week 10	Result	Winner - Arshi
Week 10	Luxury Budget Task	Statue Housemates have follow the orders passed by BIGG BOSS. List of orders given by Bigg Boss :-: Freeze – Housemate(s) have to freeze immediately.; Release – Housemate(s) are released from freeze.
Week 10	Result	Housemates successful in the Task.
Week 10	Exit	On Day 70: No eviction as the voting lines were closed.
Week 11	Nominations	For this Nominations, Bigg Boss divided the housemates into 2 teams: Team Red: Shilpa, Hiten, Luv and Priyank. Team Blue: Vikas, Akash, Puneesh and Hina. The garden was transformed into two parts for the two teams with tree between each other. This tree contained apples of housemates in each team. Housemates have to make sure that their team has more number of apples at the end of the task. At every buzzer, Captain Arshi have to cut the apple of one housemate, therefore nominating them. As a result, Team Blue had more number of apples, therefore they were safe from nomination. And Team Red: Shilpa, Hiten, Luv and Priyank were nominated for eviction.
Week 11	Tasks	BB Lab; For this task, housemates have been divided into humans and robots. Humans have to try to bring out emotions from the robots, where robots have to try not to. At every buzzer, Bigg Boss will give an emotion through the sliding door next to the swimming pool, which humans will have to bring out that emotions from the robots. Puneesh was the moderator of the task.
Week 11	Result	Winner - Team Red
Week 11	Punishments	Jail; Captain Arshi had to send 1 housemate to the Jail. She chose Akash. Housemates had to mutually decide the two worst performers in the Luxury Budget Task, who deserves Jail Punishment. They chose Priyank and Hiten.
Week 11	Captaincy	Bigg Boss ordered to captain that the winning team will select two candidates including the sanchalak for captaincy by a discussion. Later, the winning team failed to elect candidates for captaincy and so NO captain was placed this week as Bigg Boss's ordered.
Week 11	Result	No captain appointed
Week 11	Exits	On Day 77, Hiten got evicted by facing the housemates votes.
Week 12	Nominations	Bigg Boss himself nominated the entire housemates except Hina for discussing the nomination thus violating the house rule.
Week 12	Tasks	BB Poultry Farm In the beginning all housemate will be contenders for Captaincy. Garden was transformed into a Poultry Farm and a hen who lays golden eggs. After every buzzer, the hen lays a golden egg with a housemate's face on it, the egg represents the captaincy on that housemate. That housemate has to make sure that that housemate's egg is not thrown into the pool until the next buzzer, therefore becomes a contender for Captaincy, but if the egg is thrown into the pool he/she will lose their Captaincy. The housemate saving their egg can not carry the egg, the egg has to be in the nest. Housemates have to make sure that by the end of the task at least four eggs are thrown into the pool.
Week 12	Result	Winner - Hina, Priyank, Shilpa and Luv
Week 12	Punishments	Jail Housemates had to mutually decide 3 housemates to go to jail. They chose Akash, Vikas and Arshi.
Week 12	Captaincy	Hina, Priyank, Shilpa and Luv were 4 contenders for Captaincy. In the garden there was a giant photo frame, in which the 4 contenders had to stand, until only 1 housemate is standing. Other housemates have to try to get the contenders out of the photo frame.
Week 12	Result	Winner - Hina
Week 12	Exits	On Day 83, Arshi was evicted from the house by the public vote.
Week 13	Nominations	42 minutes Hina, the captain and Vikas who was directly sent to Semi-Final week were save from this Nominations. Other housemates had to in Dome, which is present in the garden and had to press the button when they think 42 minutes have passed. Where housemate in the dome had to count until 42 minutes, the other housemates had to disturb the housemate and make sure that they forget the count. If the housemates have pressed the button exactly or close to 42 minutes will become save, but if it wrong will be nominated for Eviction. As a result, the 2 housemates with the farest time from 42 mins were, Luv was 9 mins and 55 seconds late (i.e., pressed the button after 51:55 mins) and Priyank was 10 mins and 57 seconds early (i.e., pressed the button after 31:03 mins). Therefore, Priyank and Luv were nominated for eviction.
Week 13	Tasks	Ghar ayie Gharwale (Loved ones in the house); For this week Task, the loved ones of the housemate moved into the Neighbour (Padois) House. Housemates have to make the Neighbours happy and win their hearts. During this task, housemates will be given individual challenges and the winner of each challenge will be determined by the decision of the Neighbours, for winning each challenge a housemate gets a particular number of points. At the end of the Task, the housemate(s) with the most points will win the Task and get to meet their loved ones.
Week 13	Result	Winner - Vikas
Week 13	Punishments	Jail Housemates had to mutually decide one housemate to go to jail. They chose Akash.
Week 13	Exits	On Day 90, Priyank was evicted from the house by the public vote.
Week 14	Nominations	42 minutes The contestants had to rank themselves from no 1–6. The rank order is following by the names. This was also a nomination task and the ones from 3-6 were nominated while Akash and Puneesh got saved. As a result, Luv, Shilpa, Hina and Vikas were nominated for this week's nomination.
Week 14	Tasks	Mount BB; For this week task, there is a mountain created in garden, inmates will have fate of other inmates in their hands, each inmate will wear a bag of some other inmate and keep hiking on mountain, if you don't want to keep the bag of that inmate then you can empty it. There will be rounds in this task. There is a scoreboard where all inmates have three magnetic bags, after each stop/round of emptying each other's bags, all inmates will weigh their bags on scale and the one whose weight is least will lose one magnetic bag, the inmate who loses all magnetic bags will be out of the race. Hina will be responsible for weighing all the bags and update the scoreboard. The two inmates who have most magnetic bags in the end of the task will win ticket to finale.
Week 14	Result	Winner – Luv and Puneesh
Week 14	Exits	On Day 97, Luv was evicted from the house by the public vote.
Week 15
Week 15	Tasks	Arshi Chahte Hai: For this task, Arshi Khan returned. Inmates have to use delivery box, we will send inmates photos one by one, then other inmates will go to Arshi and tell what meanest thing they will do with the person whose photo has come in delivery box, Arshi will select one inmate which she thinks have the most meanest idea and she will give that inmate chance to be mean to the person in delivery box, In start on the meanest title board, Aakash's photo is there, Arshi will choose the inmate to be mean who gives most challenging options and if the inmate is able to complete his or her challenge then that inmate's photo will be put on the board replacing the previous one's photo which is Aakash right now, the one who will not complete challenge photo will not change on meanest board. At the end of task, the one whose photo is on board will win the task and get a chance to win money. Arshi says you have to be meaner than mean.
Week 15	Result	Winner – Vikas
Week 15	Happenings	Day 98 : As it is the last nomination, Bigg Boss nominated all five. As a result, Hina, Puneesh, Akash, Shilpa and Vikas were nominated for eviction.; Day 99: Arshi Khan re entered as a guest for a task.; Day 101: The Arshi task continues and Akash gets voted out.; Day 102: New Task were announced as Vikas City where he will be cruel dictator, inmates will have to follow his orders, and Vikas will try to irritate them so much that inmates try to leave the task. Inmates have to fulfil Vikas's orders as soon as they are given.; Day 103: Vikas City continues and Hina announced as the last task's winner.; Day 104: Bigg Boss shows all four finalists journey
Week 15	Exit	On Day 101, Akash was evicted from the house after facing the public vote.
Week 15	Finalists	
Week 15	3rd runner-up	Puneesh Sharma
Week 15	2nd runner-up	Vikas Gupta
Week 15	1st runner-up	Hina Khan
Week 15	Winner	Shilpa Shinde

== Nominations table ==
	Week 1	Week 2	Week 3		Week 4	Week 5	Week 6	Week 7	Week 8	Week 9	Week 10	Week 11		Week 12	Week 13	Week 14	Week 15		
	Week 1	Week 2	Week 3		Week 4	Week 5	Week 6	Week 7	Week 8	Week 9	Week 10	Day 71	Day 77	Week 12	Week 13	Week 14	Day 102	Day 105	
Nominees for Captaincy	No; Captain		~~Hina~~; Puneesh; Vikas		Hina; Sapna	Bandgi; ~~Jyoti~~; Luv; Sapna	Benafsha; Hiten; Puneesh	Akash; Bandgi; Sabyasachi	Bandgi; Luv; Puneesh	Akash; Arshi; Hiten; Shilpa; Vikas	Priyank; Vikas	Akash; Arshi; Hina; Hiten; Luv; Priyank; Puneesh; Shilpa; Vikas	No; Captain	Arshi; Luv; Shilpa; Vikas	Hina; Luv; Priyank; Shilpa	No; Captain			
House Captain	No; Captain		Vikas		Hina	Luv	Puneesh	~~Sabyasachi~~	Bandgi	Hiten	Vikas	Arshi	No; Captain	No; Captain	Hina	No; Captain			
Captain's Nominations	No; Captain		Not eligible	Sapna; Shilpa; Hina; Puneesh; Mehjabi; Luv; Akash	Akash (to evict)	Not eligible	Benafsha; Luv; Sabyasachi; Priyank; Sapna; Mehjabi; Hiten	Captain Evicted	Puneesh (to save)	Akash; Puneesh (to evict)	Luv (to save); Shilpa (to evict)	Hiten; Luv; Priyank; Shilpa (to evict)	No; Captain	No; Captain	Not eligible	No; Captain			
Jail Nominations	Akash; Arshi; Shilpa	Arshi; Hina; Sapna	Arshi; Vikas		Akash; Arshi; Pooja	Arshi; Vikas	Benafsha; Hina; Hiten	Akash; Luv; Shilpa	Akash; Bandgi; Sapna	Arshi; Bandgi; Puneesh	No Jail; Punishment	Akash; Hiten; Priyank		Akash; Arshi; Vikas	Akash; Luv	Jail Tasks Ended			
Vote to:	Evict	Save	Evict		Save / Evict	Evict		Save / Evict	None	Evict	Save	None	Save	None	Task		None	WIN	
Shilpa	Hina; Sapna	Arshi	Lucinda	Luv; Hina	Hiten (to save)	Shilpa	Sabyasachi; Priyank	Arshi (to save)	Nominated	Priyank; Luv	Puneesh	Not eligible	Priyank	No; Nominations	Not eligible	Not eligible	No; Nominations	No; Nominations	Winner (Day 105)
Hina	Vikas; Zubair	Jyoti	Lucinda	Akash; Puneesh	House; Captain	Hina	Mehjabi; Sapna	Luv (to save)	Nominated	Puneesh; Bandgi	Priyank	Not eligible	Priyank	No; Nominations	House; Captain	Not eligible	No; Nominations	No; Nominations	1st runner-up (Day 105)
Vikas	Arshi; Shilpa	Jyoti	House; Captain		Sabyasachi (to save)	Sapna	Luv; Sabyasachi	Shilpa (to save)	Not eligible	Luv; Hina	House; Captain	Not eligible	Hiten	No; Nominations	Semi; Finalist	Not eligible	No; Nominations	No; Nominations	2nd runner-up (Day 105)
Puneesh	Benafsha; Vikas	Akash	Lucinda	Mehjabi; Hina	Sapna (to evict)	Hina	House; Captain	Sapna (to evict)	Not eligible	Luv; Akash	Shilpa	Not eligible	Hiten	No; Nominations	Not eligible	Not eligible	No; Nominations	No; Nominations	3rd runner-up (Day 105)
Akash	Priyank; Shivani	Puneesh	Lucinda	Sapna; Hina	Not eligible	Shilpa	Priyank; Benafsha	Bandgi (to save)	Safety; Shield	Puneesh; Bandgi	Shilpa	Not eligible	Priyank	No; Nominations	Not eligible	Not eligible	No; Nominations	Evicted (Day 102)	
Luv	Arshi; Bandgi	Jyoti (to evict)	Lucinda	Hina; Sapna	Bandgi (to save)	House; Captain	Sapna; Benafsha	Hina (to save)	Not eligible	Puneesh; Bandgi	Hina	Not eligible	Priyank	No; Nominations	Not eligible	Not eligible	Evicted (Day 98)		
Priyank	Shilpa; Zubair	Ejected (Day 6)				Hiten	Mehjabi; Sabyasachi	Hiten (to save)	Nominated	Puneesh; Bandgi	Arshi	Not eligible	BTM 2	No; Nominations	Not eligible	Evicted (Day 90)			
Arshi	Hina; Shilpa	Shilpa	Luv	Luv; Hina	Benafsha (to evict)	Pooja	Priyank; Benafsha	Vikas (to save)	Not eligible	Puneesh; Bandgi	Hiten	House; Captain	Hiten	No; Nominations	Evicted (Day 83)				
Hiten	Puneesh; Zubair	Jyoti	Luv	Puneesh; Luv	Shilpa (to evict)	Hiten	Mehjabi; Sabyasachi	Akash (to save)	Not eligible	House; Captain	Shilpa	Not eligible	BTM 2	Evicted by Housemates (Day 77)					
Bandgi	Jyoti; Shilpa	Jyoti	Lucinda	Hina; Mehjabi	Luv (to evict)	Benafsha	Benafsha; Sapna	Puneesh (to save)	House; Captain	Luv; Akash	Evicted (Day 63)								
Sapna	Jyoti; Shilpa	Bandgi	Lucinda	Hina; Shilpa	Puneesh (to save)	Sapna	Luv; Hiten	Not eligible	Nominated	Evicted (Day 55)									
Benafsha	Jyoti; Shilpa	Jyoti	Luv	Akash; Puneesh	Arshi (to save)	Bandgi	Mehjabi; Sabyasachi	Priyank (to save)	Evicted (Day 49)										
Sabyasachi	Arshi; Bandgi	Jyoti (to evict)	Luv	Sapna; Hina	Vikas (to save)	Sabyasachi	Priyank; Sapna	Evicted (Day 42)											
Mehjabi	Arshi; Bandgi	Jyoti (to evict)	Lucinda	Sapna; Akash	Jyoti (to evict)	Sabyasachi	Benafsha; Priyank	Evicted (Day 42)											
Pooja	Not In House				Exempt	Pooja	Evicted (Day 35)												
Jyoti	Benafsha; Hina	Benafsha	Luv	Puneesh; Shilpa	Mehjabi (to save)	Evicted (Day 28)													
Lucinda	Arshi; Bandgi	Jyoti (to evict)	Luv	Evicted by Housemates (Day 15)															
Shivani	Akash; Shilpa	Hiten	Evicted (Day 14)																
Zubair	Jyoti; Priyank	Ejected (Day 6)																	
Notes	1,2	3	4	5,6	7,8,9,10	11,12,13	5,14	15	16,17,18	19	20,21	22	23	24	25	None			
Against Public Vote	Arshi; Bandgi; ~~Hina~~; Jyoti; Shilpa; Zubair	Hina; Jyoti; Sapna; Shivani; Vikas	Lucinda; Luv; Mehjabi; Sabyasachi	Akash; Hina; Luv; Puneesh; Sapna	Akash; Benafsha; Jyoti; Sapna; Shilpa; Vikas	Bandgi; Benafsha; Hina; Hiten; Pooja; Priyank; Sabyasachi; Sapna; Shilpa	Benafsha; Mehjabi; Priyank; Sabyasachi; Sapna	Benafsha; Hina; Sapna	Hina; Priyank; Sapna; Shilpa	Bandgi; Luv; Puneesh	Akash; Shilpa	Hiten; Luv; Priyank; Shilpa	Hiten; Priyank	Akash; Arshi; Luv; Priyank; Puneesh; Shilpa; Vikas	Luv; Priyank	Hina; Luv; Shilpa; Vikas	Akash; Hina; Puneesh; Shilpa; Vikas	Hina; Puneesh; Shilpa; Vikas	
Ejected	Priyank	None																	
Ejected	Zubair	None																	
Re-entered	None				Priyank	None													
Evicted	No; Eviction	Shivani	Lucinda	No; Eviction	Jyoti	Pooja	Mehjabi	Benafsha	Sapna	Bandgi	No; Eviction	Hiten		Arshi	Priyank	Luv	Akash	Puneesh	Vikas
Evicted	No; Eviction	Shivani	Lucinda	No; Eviction	Jyoti	Pooja	Sabyasachi	Benafsha	Sapna	Bandgi	No; Eviction	Hiten		Arshi	Priyank	Luv	Akash	Hina	Shilpa

Color Key

indicates that the Housemate was directly nominated for eviction.
indicates that the Housemate was immune prior to nominations.
indicates the winner.
indicates the first runner up.
indicates the second runner up.
indicates the third runner up.
indicates the contestant has been evicted.
indicates the contestant walked out due to emergency.
indicates the contestant has been ejected.
house captain.
indicates the contestant is nominated.

=== Nomination notes ===
- ^1: This housemate was the current member of Padosi (Neighbour) and could not be nominated for eviction through the standard nomination process that week. Their identity was hidden from non-members.
- ^2: The Padosis (Neighbours) were given a special power to save one nominated housemate and directly nominated 2 housemates. They saved Hina and nominated Arshi and Bandgi.
- ^3: The Padosis (Neighbours) were given a special power to directly nominate one housemate and they chose Jyoti.
- ^4: The Padosis (Neighbours) failed to complete the secret task. As a punishment, all of them was directly nominated for Instant Ejection. All housemates excluding Captain Vikas, voted to eject 1 Padosi housemate.
- ^5: The Captain got a special power to nominate seven housemates. However, Voting Lines are closed so therefore no eviction took place.
- ^6: Housemates could only choose two housemates for nomination between the seven nominated housemates by Captain Vikas. Housemates not chosen by the captain were hence rendered immune.
- ^7: In this Nominations Bigg Boss himself Nominated Arshi, Bandgi, Mehjabi, Puneesh, Shilpa and Vikas, who were the victims of not following the House Rules. Pooja was exempted from nominations as it was her first week.
- ^8: Bigg Boss asked the nominated housemates to hold the hand of saved housemates and if they leave their hand they would be saved and the saved housemates will get nominated but if they hold their hand until half an hour, they would remain nominated and the saved housemates will remain save.
- ^9: The pairs were Arshi and Benafsha, Bandgi and Luv, Mehjab and Jyoti, Puneesh and Sapna, Shilpa and Hiten, Vikas and Sabyasachi. Arshi, Bandgi, Mehjabi and Puneesh left their respective partner's hand and nominated them and themselves got saved. Shilpa and Vikas did not leave their partner's hand thus saving their partner and themselves got nominated.
- ^10: Bigg Boss asked Hina, the house captain, to hold Akash's hand. If she leaves his hand, he will get nominated but if she doesn't, both of them would be saved from nominations. Hina decided to leave Akash's hand.
- ^11: Bigg Boss made seven pairs that were Hiten and Priyank, Sapna and Vikas, Pooja and Arshi, Benafsha and Bandgi, Akash and Shilpa, Hina and Puneesh, Mehjabi and Sabyasachi and they were asked to tell the name of the housemate who will get nominated by mutual consent. The other person would be saved from nominations. If they were not able to decide in the given time, both of them will get nominated.
- ^12: Hiten, Sapna, Pooja, Shilpa, Hina and Sabyasachi decided to get nominated. Benafsha and Bandgi did not decide and both them got themselves nominated.
- ^13: Bigg Boss asked all the pairs not to tell anything about nominations to any other contestant until bigg boss announced it himself. Priyank, after coming out from the confession room, appealed to his fans to save Hiten, thus violating the rule. Bigg Boss nominated him himself.
- ^14: Shilpa was granted immunity by Tanisha Mukherjee, Karanvir Bohra and Sweta Singh by the winning the task of Secrets.
- ^15: Benafsha violated the rule by getting physical with Akash, in the previous week. Bigg Boss directly nominated her himself for this week, while Hina got pull back from being save for this week after removing the ZERO tattoo made on Luv's Forehead which was made to save her as bigg boss told her not to apply any makeup or try to clean during nomination process.
- ^16: Appy Fizz feel the fizz Nominations for this Nominations, there was Appy Fizz safe zone in the garden. The members with the membership will be save from this week's nominations. At the end of six buzzers Vikas, Hiten, Arshi and Luv had the membership. And were safe from this Nominations.
- ^17: Akash saved himself by using his Safety Shield which was given by Gauahar Khan in Week 4.
- ^18: Captain Bandgi had a special power to save one unsafe housemate, she saved Puneesh.
- ^19: That was the first ever regular nominations held in this season as contestant goes to confession room to give two names.
- ^20: Housemates saved one housemate each. Captain got a special power to save one nominated housemate and directly nominate one safe housemate.
- ^21: Both the nominated contestants were declared safe thus there was No eviction as the voting lines were closed.
- ^22: Housemates were nominated due to failing in task by having a low number of apples on their tree.
- ^23: Hiten and Priyank got the fewest votes in the public votes. As a twist, housemates had to vote to save one housemate.
- ^24: Bigg Boss himself nominated the entire housemates except Hina for discussing the nomination thus violating the house rule.
- ^25: Two housemates with the fairest time from 42 mins were, Luv was 9 mins 55 seconds late (i.e., pressed the button after 51:55 mins) and Priyank was 10 mins 57 seconds early (i.e., pressed the button after 31:03 mins). Therefore, Priyank and Luv were Nominated for Eviction.
