= Prashant Raj Sachdev =

Indian model and actor (born 1984)

- Born: 9 January 1984 (age 42); Bombay, Maharashtra, India
- Education: Bombay Scottish School, Mumbai Delhi Public School, R. K. Puram, New Delhi (Graduated batch of 1998); Sri Venkateswara College, University of Delhi (Graduated batch of 2001) Lee Strasberg Theater & Film Institute, New York (2010)
- Occupation: actor
- Years active: 2007 – present

Prashant Raj is a model and actor from Mumbai, India who debuted in Ram Gopal Varma's remake of Ramesh Sippy's Sholay, titled Ram Gopal Varma Ki Aag.

== Career ==
Sachdev is a former model and a struggling from Mumbai, India who landed the role played by Amitabh Bachchan in Ramesh Sippy's Sholay, remade by Ram Gopal Varma as Ram Gopal Varma Ki Aag. His second film, Toss, was released 28 August 2009. It was also the debut vehicle for Roadies' Rannvijay Singh and Madhuurima, and the film co-stars Aarti Chhabria and Ashmit Patel. Both of his films have been disasters. First ad campaign was for Benzer. Worked in Event Management with Percept D'Mark (PDM India), Showdiff.

In Aag, he played the role of Raj, originally played by Amitabh Bachchan as Jai. The original name of the film was Ram Gopal Varma Ke Sholay, however, due to copyright concerns, the name had to be changed.

Appeared in several Lakme India Fashion Week shows in Mumbai and Delhi. Sachdev, who is 6'3", has done ramp and print campaigns in India, Sri Lanka, and Ecuador. He was on a team with model Sahil Shroff on the AXN Network's The Amazing Race Asia reality/adventure TV show, in their first Asian season.

== Filmography ==
While gearing up to leave for Los Angeles, the role fell into his lap. Aag, as he puts it, was a stroke of luck while he was busy making plans.

Year	Film	Role	Language	Notes
2007	Ram Gopal Varma Ki Aag	Raj Ranade	Hindi	Bollywood debut
2009	Toss	Samy	Hindi	

== Awards ==
Year	Award
2004	Won Grasim Mr. India -Universe title
2005	Won "Mr. Model of the Universe" 2005 in Quito, Ecuador
