= Gautam Gulati =

Indian film and TV actor (Born: 1987)

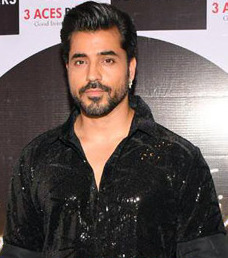
- Gulati in 2023
- Born: 27 November 1987 (age 38); Delhi, India
- Other names: Gauti; GG
- Education: Hansraj College, North Campus, DU
- Occupations: Actor; TV Personality
- Years active: 2008–Present
- Known for: Tujh Sang Preet Lagayi Sajna; Diya Aur Baati Hum; Bigg Boss 8

Gautam Gulati (born 27 November 1987) is an Indian actor and reality television personality who primarily works in Hindi films and television. He is best known for his roles as Vikram Rathi in the soap opera Diya Aur Baati Hum and Shaurya Khanna in Pyaar Kii Ye Ek Kahaani. He achieved widespread recognition after emerging as the winner of the reality television series Bigg Boss 8 in 2015.

Following his reality television breakthrough, Gulati transitioned into mainstream commercial cinema, portraying former Indian cricketer Ravi Shastri in the biographical sports drama Azhar and appearing as the antagonist Girgit in the action feature Radhe. He returned to reality television as a gang leader on MTV Roadies for its nineteenth and twentieth seasons, and in September 2026, he joined the competitive reality streaming series Rise and Fall 2 on Prime Video.

== Early life ==
Gautam Gulati was born on 27 November 1987 into a Punjabi family in Delhi, India, where he was raised by his mother, Anurag Gulati, alongside his elder brother, Mohit (Kapil) Gulati. He completed his schooling in Delhi and later graduated from the prestigious Hansraj College under the University of Delhi.

During his youth, Gulati trained extensively in martial arts and received professional contemporary dance training at the Shiamak Davar Dance Academy. He began developing his acting skills on stage within the live theater circuit at Delhi's Mandi House hub. After graduating, he worked as a commercial fashion model, notably appearing in a television advertisement alongside Amitabh Bachchan at the age of 22. To better understand filmmaking, Gulati also worked as a behind-the-scenes crew member on film sets, including Salman Khan's Veer, prior to landing his mainstream television breakthrough.

== Career ==
=== Early television and daily soaps (2008–2014) ===
Gulati made his television acting debut in 2008 with Ekta Kapoor's mythological series Kahaani Hamaaray Mahaabhaarat Ki, portraying a teenage Duryodhan. He followed this with supporting roles in daily soap operas, including Zee TV's Kasamh Se and Star Plus's Tujh Sang Preet Lagayi Sajna.

From 2010 to 2011, he played Shaurya Khanna in the supernatural romantic drama Pyaar Kii Ye Ek Kahaani. He gained widespread recognition for his comedic timing and portrayal of Vikram Rathi in the high-rated Star Plus serial Diya Aur Baati Hum, a role he played from 2011 until his departure from the show in 2014. During this early phase, Gulati also expanded into feature and independent cinema. In 2013, he played Devadutta in the international epic film Sri Siddhartha Gautama. He subsequently starred as Jogi in Rakesh Mehta's short film Darpok in 2014, which was screened at the 67th Cannes Film Festival, making him one of the first mainstream Indian television actors to walk the Cannes red carpet.

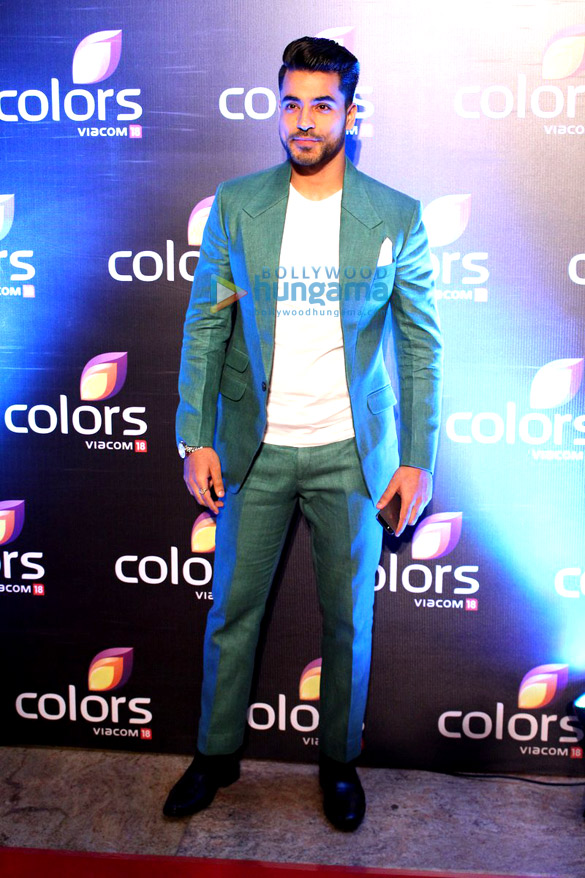
Gautam post winning Bigg Boss 8 at Colors TV Bash in 2016

=== Bigg Boss breakthrough and cinema transition (2014–2022) ===
In September 2014, Gulati entered the eighth season of India's premier reality series, Bigg Boss 8. Despite early house-wide isolation and multiple conflicts with fellow housemates, his defiant attitude and unique personality triggered an unprecedented fan phenomenon across social media platforms. Audiences rallied around him under the fictional moniker of "Gautam City", a trend that eventually materialized inside the house when the producers designed a custom task themed entirely around his fictional kingdom. His popularity was further cemented by a viral, self-composed anthem, "We love, we love Gauti", which became synonymous with his redemption arc on the show. He went on to win the season in January 2015. Following his victory, he hosted the youth anthology series MTV Big F in 2015 and the reality show Mujhse Shaadi Karoge.

Post-Bigg Boss, Gulati transitioned fully into commercial film and web media. In 2016, he made his commercial Bollywood debut in the biographical sports drama Azhar, portraying former Indian cricketer Ravi Shastri. He followed this with supporting roles in the romantic comedies Behen Hogi Teri and Virgin Bhanupriya. In 2019, he headlined the Eros Now action-thriller web series Operation Cobra, playing RAW Agent Karan Singh. In 2021, he portrayed a ruthless antagonist named Girgit alongside Salman Khan in the action thriller Radhe.

=== Return to reality television (2023–present) ===
In 2023, Gulati returned to the Roadies franchise as a "Gang Leader" for the nineteenth season, MTV Roadies: Karm Ya Kaand, appearing alongside Prince Narula and Rhea Chakraborty. He reprised his leadership role for the twentieth season, MTV Roadies: Double Cross. In September 2026, Gulati returned to competitive reality television as a contestant on the second season of Prime Video's high-stakes survival show Rise and Fall, hosted by Virender Sehwag. His participation garnered significant media attention due to intense tactical alliances and public confrontations with fellow housemates.

== Television ==
Year	Title	Role(s)	Notes	Ref.
2007	MTV Roadies 5	Contestant	Personal Interview Round	
2008	Kahaani Hamaaray Mahaabhaarat Ki	Duryodhana (teenage)		
2008–2009	Kasamh Se	Varun Sahil Bali		
2008–2010	Tujh Sang Preet Lagayi Sajna	Teji		
2010–2011	Pyaar Kii Ye Ek Kahaani	Shaurya Khanna		
2010	CID	Abhimanyu	Episode 620	
2011–2014	Diya Aur Baati Hum	Vikram Arun Rathi		
2012	Nach Baliye 5	Himself	Guest	
2013	Nach Baliye 6	Himself	Guest	
2014–2015	Bigg Boss 8	Contestant	Winner	
2014–2015	Bigg Boss Halla Bol	Contestant	Winner	
2015	Farah Ki Dawat	Contestant	Guest	
2015	Jhalak Dikhhla Jaa 8	Guest Contestant	Guest	
2015	Kaisi Yeh Yaariyan	Himself	Guest	
2015	MTV Big F	Himself	Host	
2015	Bigg Boss 9	Himself	Guest	
2016	Bigg Boss 10	Himself	Guest	
2017	The Kapil Sharma Show	Himself	Guest	
2018	Bigg Boss 12	Himself	Guest	
2019	Bigg Boss 13	Himself	Guest	
2020	Mujhse Shaadi Karoge	Himself	Host	
2021	Bigg Boss 15	Himself	Guest	
2023	MTV Roadies: Karm Ya Kaand	Himself	Gang Leader	
2024-25	MTV Roadies: Double Cross	Himself	Gang Leader	
2026	Rise and Fall 2	Himself	Contestant	

== Filmography ==
=== Films ===
Year	Title	Role(s)	Notes	Ref.
2014	Darpok	Jogi	Short film	
2014	Sri Siddhartha Gautama	Devadatta		
2016	Azhar	Ravi Shastri	Debut film	
2017	Behen Hogi Teri	Rahul		
2020	Virgin Bhanupriya	Shartiya/Abhimanyu		
2021	Radhe	Girgit		

=== Web series ===
Year	Title	Role(s)	Notes	Ref.
2018	A Wicked Plan	Shivdas Rao		
2019	Operation Cobra	Agent Karan Singh		

== Music videos ==
Year	Title	Singer(s)	Album	Label	Ref.
2015	Teddy Bear	Kanika Kapoor, Ikka Singh	The Big Indian Wedding	Zee Music Company	
2020	Besharam Bewaffa	B Praak	Non-album single	T-Series	
2022	Meri Tarah	Payal Dev, Jubin Nautiyal	Non-album single	T-Series	
2022	Choti Choti Galtiyan	Papon	Non-album single	DRJ Records	
2022	Jaana Hai Toh Jaa	Mohammed Irfan	Non-album single	SK Music Works	
2022	Khata	Rahat Fateh Ali Khan	Non-album single	Tashan Bolly Studio	
2022	Ishq Hi Hai	Saman (Saman Deep Singh)	Non-album single	Tips Punjabi/Tips Originals	
2023	Badtameez	Mallika Sethi, Harshit Tomar	Non-album single	Platinum Music	
2023	Upper Back	Arjun Singh	Non-album single	Be Happy Music	
2023	Malika-E-Hussan	Yaseer Desai	Non-album single	Canvas Cave Studios	
2024	Anjaam Tumhara Hoga	Altamash Faridi	Non-album single	United White Flag Music House	
2026	Kehndi Mujhko	Abraham Khanna	Non-album single	Nickhiel Jain	
2026	Haniya	Ali Quli Mirza, Rahat Fateh Ali Khan	Non-album single	Loudtone Music	

== Awards and nominations ==
Year	Award	Category	Work	Result
2014	Indian Telly Awards	Best Actor in a Supporting Role (Comedy)	Diya Aur Baati Hum	Nominated
2015	Television Style Awards	Most Stylish Actor in Reality Show	Bigg Boss 8	Won
2015	Gold Awards	Most Fit Male Actor	Bigg Boss 8	Nominated
2015	Indian Television Academy Awards	Most Stylish Male in Reality Series	Bigg Boss 8	Won
