= Ashish Parmar =

Indian photographer (1979–2020)

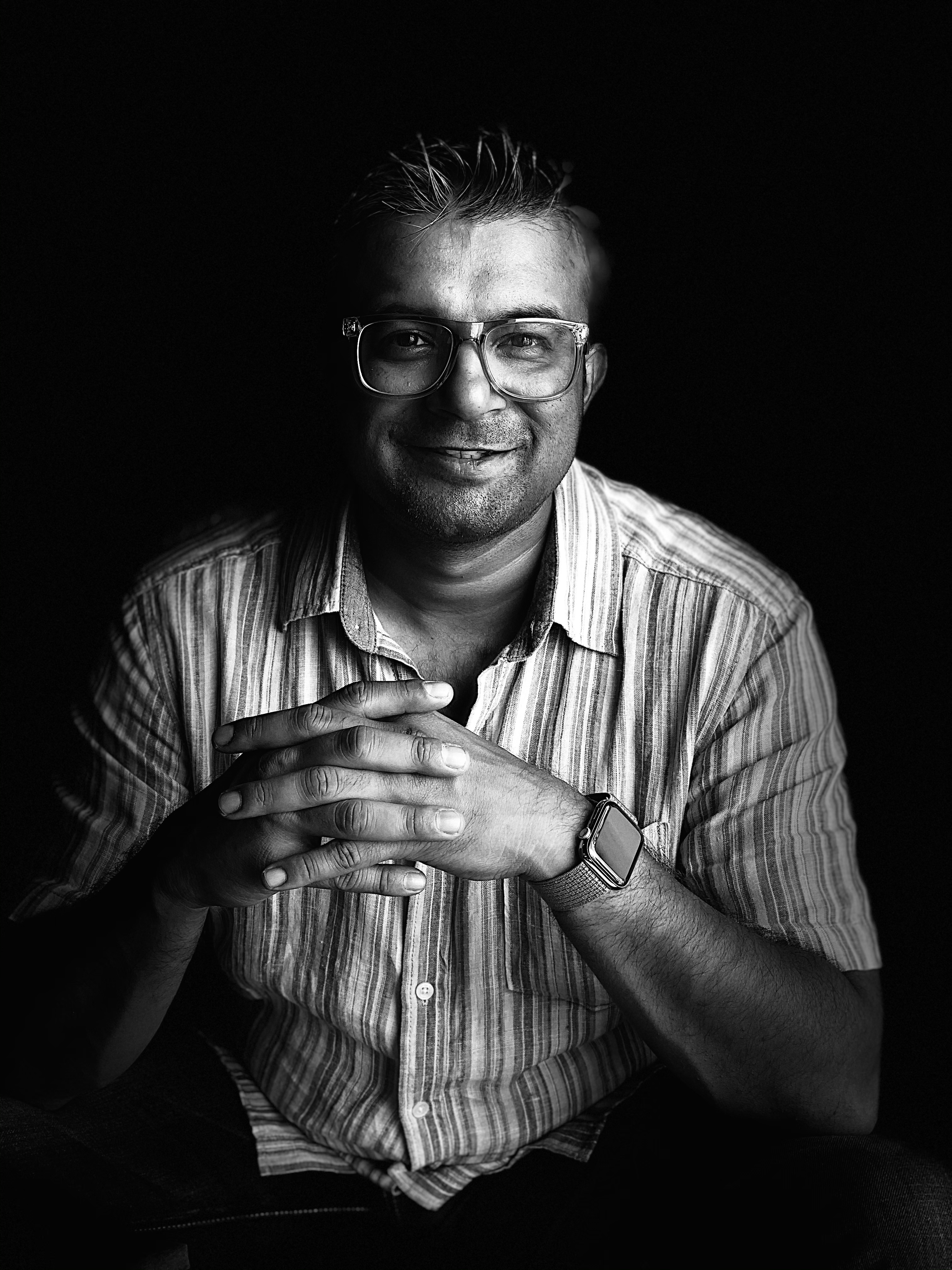
- Parmar in 2019
- Born: 8 October 1979
- Died: 23 January 2020 (aged 40)
- Known for: First Indian featured on Apple Inc.'s Shot on iPhone campaign, Official Photographer for the Royal Challengers Bangalore and Neha Dhupia's wedding
- Spouse: Raina Nanaiah

Ashish Parmar (8 October 1979 – 23 January 2020) was an Indian photographer who is best known for his iPhone photograph that was plastered on billboards across the world. He shot subjects of varied nature – weddings, high end events, music festivals and wildlife. He was the Official Photographer for the Royal Challengers Bangalore in 2010. He was also one among the top 12 Electronic Dance Music photographers in India. In 2016, an image he took of his wife and posted on Instagram was chosen as a part of Apple’s "Shot on iPhone 6S" ad campaign. He was also the only Indian photographer to be invited to the Future Music Festival Asia held in Kuala Lumpur in 2014.

== Biography ==
Ashish Parmar was born and brought up in Bangalore. He had no formal education beyond senior secondary (10th grade) but had been interested in photography from the age of 16. He became a full-time photographer in 1996.

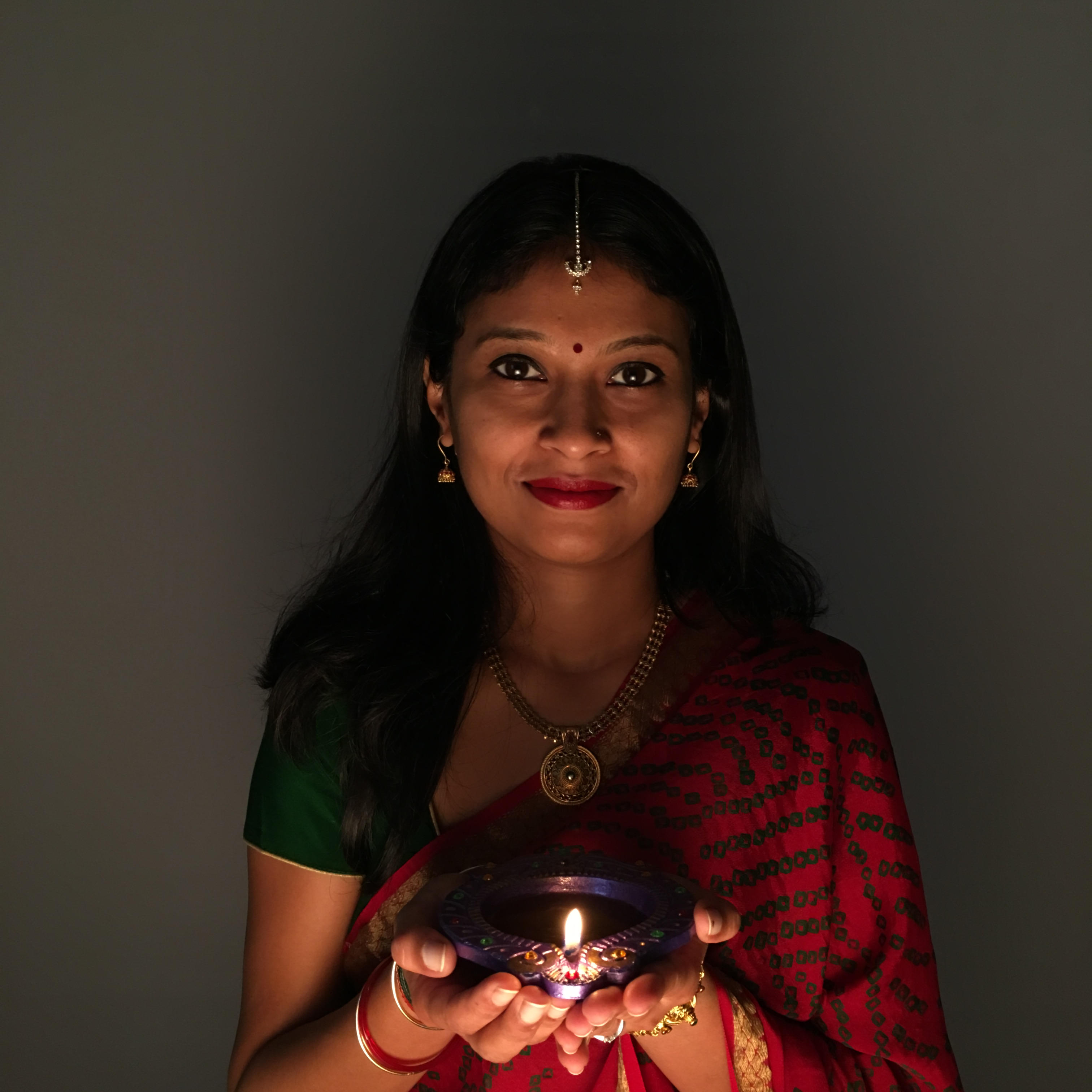
Picture of his wife, Raina that was uploaded on Instagram

== iPhone 6S campaign ==
Ashish has been featured in multiple online newspapers about being selected for the iPhone 6S campaign. Pictures that were shot on an iPhone 6S were featured in the iPhone 6S Photo Gallery. His candid shot of his wife holding a diya in her hand in a red saree with a purple-colored diya cupped in her hands, looking straight into the camera with a natural smile was plastered on hoardings at various locations in India (Bengaluru, Mumbai, Chennai and Kolkata) and abroad, including the US (Los Angeles, Manhattan and New York), UK (London) and France. His picture was one of 53 images from 41 individuals chosen across the world. Ashish was the only Indian resident to get selected. Ashish and his wife, Raina were also featured on news channels like ETV News Kannada and News9 after their photo went viral.

== Latest achievements ==
In April 2019, a photograph shot by Ashish in Maasai Mara, Kenya of a cheetah staring right into the camera was featured on Instagram. The photograph was of a curious sub adult cheetah that was inquisitive enough to check what the trigger noises of the camera was all about.

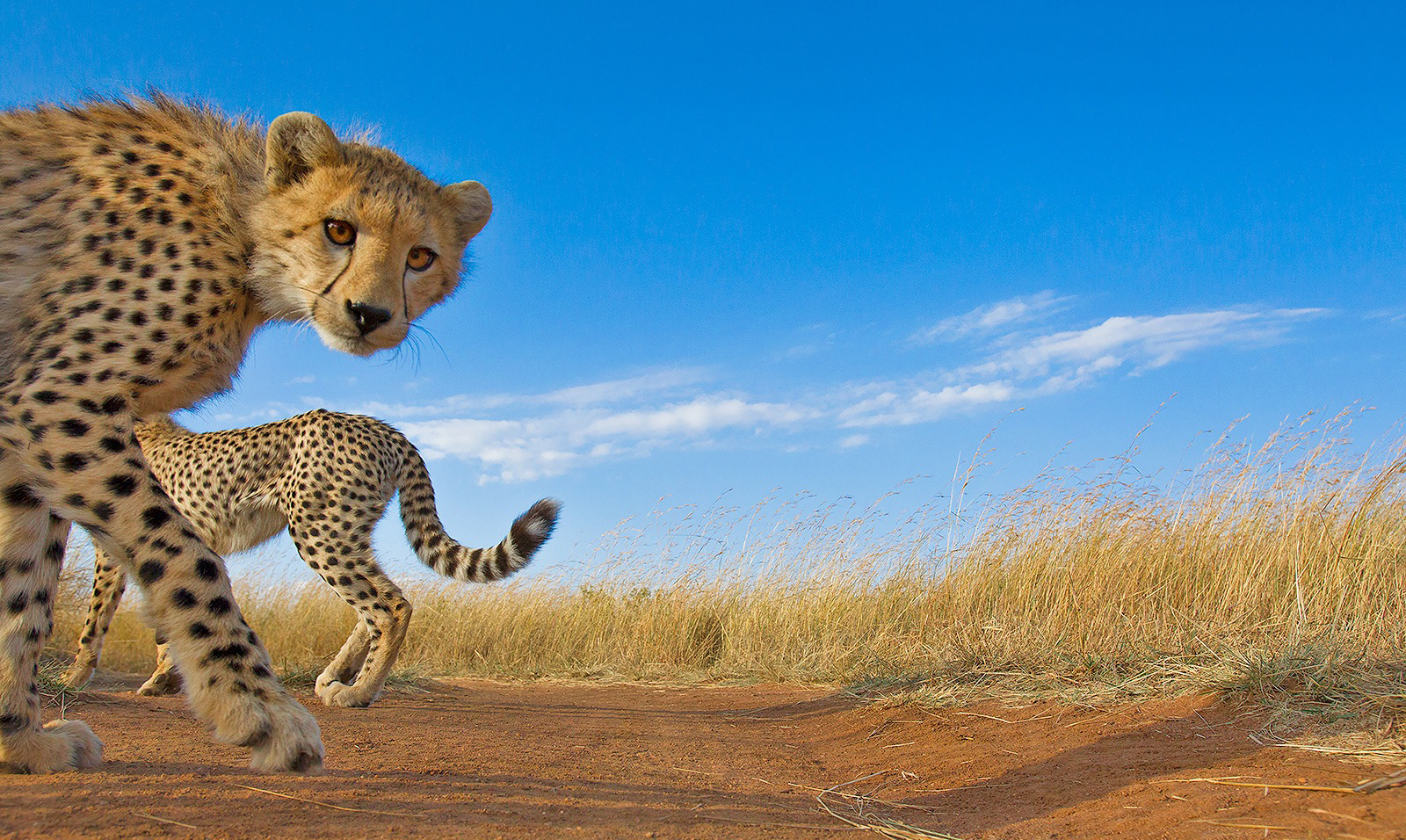

In May 2018, he was commissioned to shoot the hush-hush wedding of famous Bollywood actor, Neha Dhupia. Ashish had met Dhupia at the MTV Roadies shoot in 2018 and they hit it off and became friends.

In March 2018, Ashish shot the MTV Roadies, a very popular youth-based reality show hosted by Rannvijay Singh. In the show, a group of contestants traveled to different destinations and participated in various tasks that challenged their physical and mental strength.[1] Ashish Parmar also shot MTV Roadies in 2019 for the show was called Roadies: Real Heroes. In 2019, it was shot in parts of Kerala, Coorg and Chikmagalur.

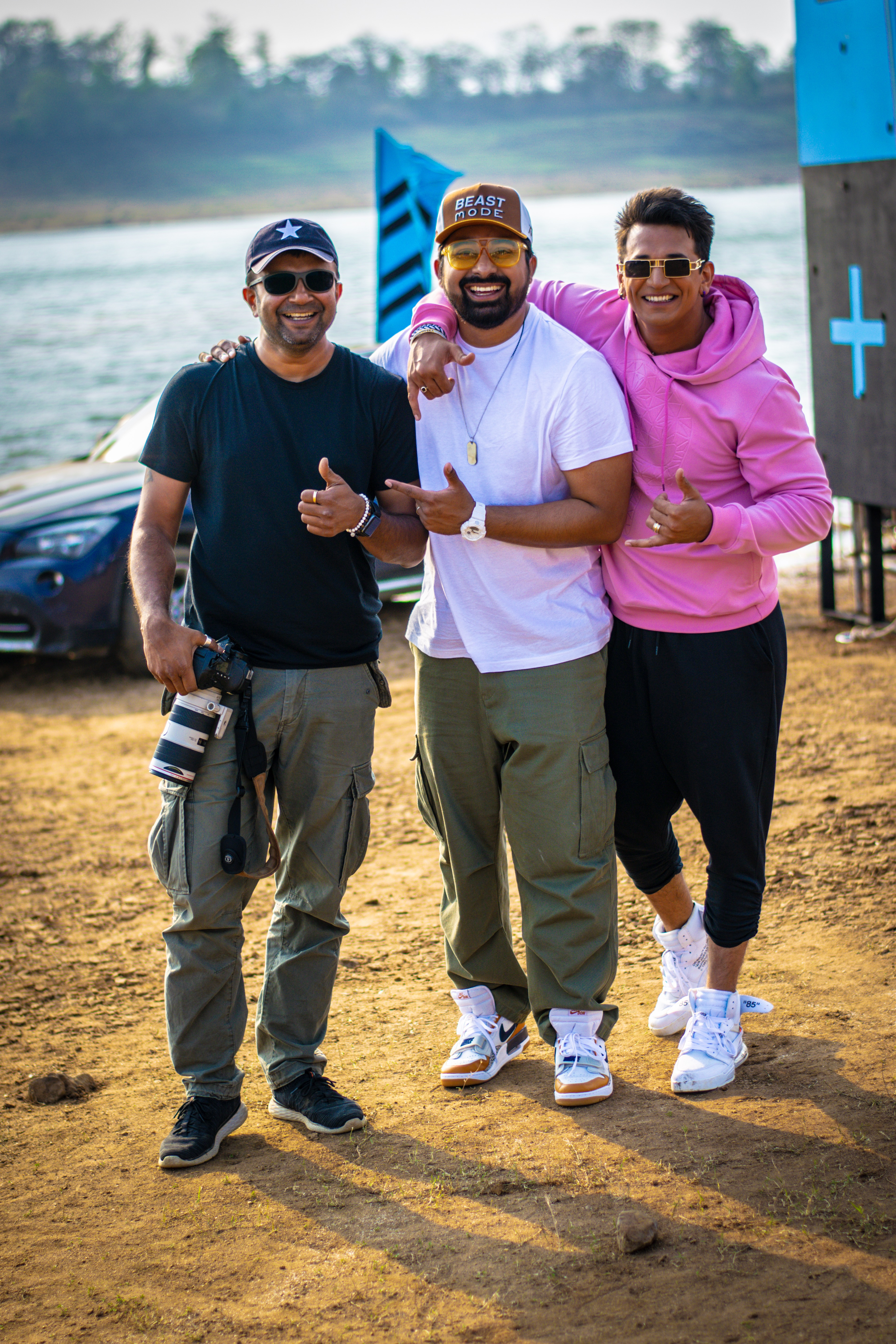

In November 2018, Tim Cook, CEO of Apple Inc. wished the world for Diwali by tweeting 2 photographs shot by Ashish Parmar.

Being one of the first photographers to shoot images of a very rare 'spotted' zebra, Ashish Parmar was featured in newspapers and social media.

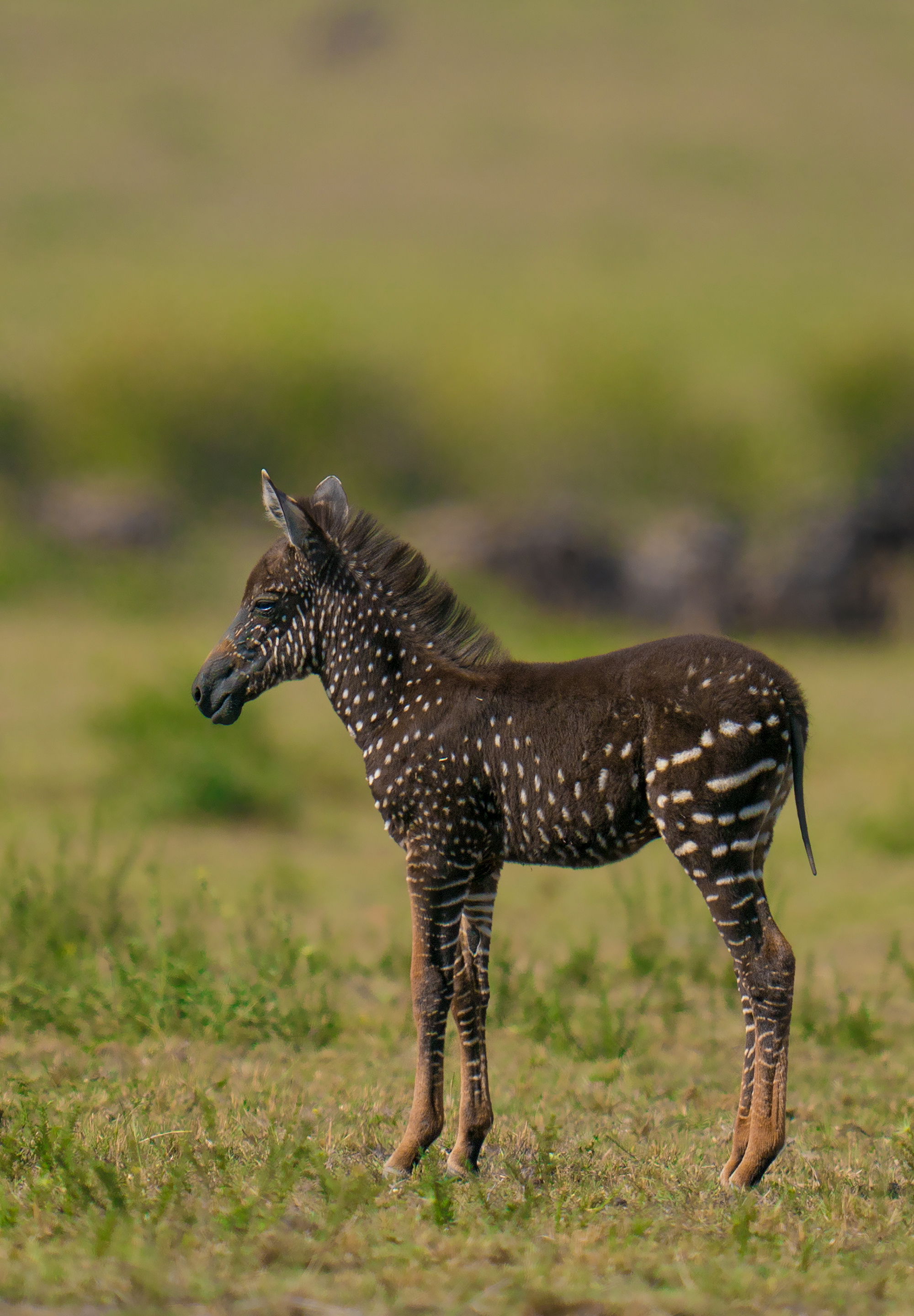
Tira Spotted Zebra

== In other media ==
Ashish’s image that was shot at VH1 Supersonic, was featured in Forbes India in December 2015. His images have been used by Lonely Planet and Nat Geo Traveller. An image of his taken on his iPhone X in March 2018 was tweeted by Tim Cook, CEO of Apple Inc.

== Death ==
After he suffered a heart attack, he was admitted to a hospital for two weeks but succumbed ultimately on 23 January 2020.
