= Bani J =

Indian actress, model, and VJ

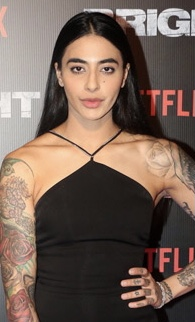
- Gurbani Judge in 2017
- Born: Gurbani Judge; 29 November 1987 (age 38); Chandigarh, India
- Other name: VJ Bani
- Occupations: VJ; model; television host
- Years active: 2006–present
- Known for: MTV Roadies 4 Fear Factor: Khatron Ke Khiladi 4 Bigg Boss 10; Four More Shots Please!

Gurbani Judge (born 29 November 1987), known as Bani J or VJ Bani, is an Indian fitness model, actress and former MTV India presenter who primarily works in hindi television and streaming platforms. She is known for participating in MTV Roadies 4, Fear Factor: Khatron Ke Khiladi 4 and Bigg Boss 10. She has also starred in the web series Four More Shots Please!. Currently she is one of the Gang leader in MTV Roadies Rebirth.

== Early and personal life ==
Judge was born 29 November 1987 in Chandigarh. Her family consists of her mother Tanya and her elder sister Saneya. She promotes the sports nutrition company Myprotein and the fitness app Mobiefit Body. She studied at Woodstock School, Mussoorie, graduating in 2005.

== Career ==
Judge started her career by competing in the reality show MTV Roadies 4 where she was the 1st runner-up. She continued her collaboration with MTV Roadies 5. She was also a contestant on Fear Factor: Khatron Ke Khiladi 4. Apart from her work on MTV, Bani also acted in films like Thikka and Aap Kaa Surroor - The Real Luv Story.

In 2016, she appeared in Navv Inder's music video "Att Tera Yaar" and in Honey Singh's "Raat Jashan Di". In October 2016, she was a contestant on Bigg Boss 10, where she finished as the 1st runner-up.

She also appeared in the web series Four More Shots Please! as Umang Singh.

== Filmography ==
=== Films ===
Year	Title	Role	Language	Notes	Ref
2007	Aap Kaa Surroor	Bani	Hindi	Debut film	
2011	Soundtrack	Herself	Hindi	Cameo Appearance	
2016	Zorawar	Zoya	Punjabi	Punjabi Debut	
2016	Thikka	Kamala	Telugu	Telugu Debut	
2018	Ishqeria	Asha	Hindi		
2022	Valimai	Sara	Tamil	Tamil Debut	
2024	Double iSmart	Bentley	Telugu		
2026	Jailer 2	Roddy's henchwoman	Tamil		

=== Television ===
Year	Title	Role	Notes	Ref.
2006–2007	MTV Roadies 4	Contestant	1st runner-up	
2008–2009	MTV Roadies 6	Host		
2009–2010	MTV Roadies 7	Host		
2011	Fear Factor: Khatron Ke Khiladi 4	Contestant	9th place	
2012	MTV Roadies 9	Host		
2012–2013	MTV Vogue Style in 60	Herself		
2013	MTV Roadies 10	Host		
2014	MTV Roadies 11	Host		
2014–2015	Box Cricket League 1	Contestant		
2015	MTV Roadies 12	Host		
2015	MTV Campus Diaries	Herself		
2015	MTV Unplugged	Herself		
2015	I Can Do That	Contestant		
2016	NBA Slam	Herself	Guest	
2016	Box Cricket League 2	Contestant		
2016	Comedy Nights Live	Herself	Guest	
2016–2017	Bigg Boss 10	Contestant	1st runner-up	
2019	Nach Baliye 9	Herself	Guest	
2020	Ladies vs Gentlemen	Panelist		
2026	Roadies Rebirth 21	Gang Leader		

=== Web series ===
Year	Title	Role	Language	Platform	Notes	Ref.
2019–2025	Four More Shots Please!	Umang Singh	Hindi	Amazon Prime Video	Web debut; 4 seasons	
