= Baseer Ali =

Indian model, television personality and actor

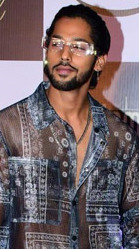
- Ali in 2023
- Born: 5 September 1995 (age 31); Hyderabad, Telangana, India
- Occupations: Actor; model; television personality
- Years active: 2017–present
- Known for: MTV Roadies; Splitsvilla 10; Ace Of Space 2 Kundali Bhagya; Bigg Boss 19

Baseer Ali (born 5 September 1995) is an Indian actor, model, host and television personality. He is most popularly known for winning Splitsvilla 10 as well as participating in Roadies Rising and Ace Of Space 2 where he emerged as the runner-up. He made his acting debut with Kundali Bhagya. In 2025, he participated in Bigg Boss 19.

== Early life ==
Ali was born on 5 September 1995 in Hyderabad. Before participating in Roadies Rising, he was a content creator.

== Career ==
Ali started his television career in 2017 by participating in MTV India's Roadies Rising where he emerged as the runner-up. He participated in Splitsvilla 10 and emerged as the winner with Naina Singh.

In 2018, he hosted On Road With Roadies for Roadies Xtreme and Splitsvilla 11 with Divya Agarwal on Voot. In 2019, he hosted On Road With Roadies on for Roadies: Real Heroes with Shruti Sinha. He participated in MTV India's Ace of Space 2 soon after. He finished as the second runner-up.

In 2023, Ali made his acting debut with Zee TV's Kundali Bhagya as Shaurya Luthra. He was cast opposite Sana Sayyad, who was later replaced by Adrija Roy. Though he announced his exit from the show in June 2024, he officially wrapped his role on the series in December 2024.

In August 2025, Ali participated in Bigg Boss 19 after rejecting the offer for two years. He became the captain during the second week by dominating the captaincy task.

== Media image ==
Ali topped the Hyderabad's Most Desirable Man list by The Times of India in 2017. He was also ranked 17th by the portal in the India's Most Desirable Men list that year.

== Filmography ==
=== Television ===
Year	Show	Role	Notes	Ref.
2017	Roadies 14	Contestant	Runner-Up	
2017	Splitsvilla 10	Contestant	Winner	
2018	Roadies Xtreme	Digital host		
2018	Splitsvilla X1	Digital host		
2019	Roadies: Real Heroes	Digital host		
2019	Ace of Space 2	Contestant	2nd Runner-Up	
2022	Roadies 18	Contestant	7th Place	
2023–2024	Kundali Bhagya	Shaurya Luthra		
2024	Kumkum Bhagya	Shaurya Luthra	Guest Appearance	
2025	Bigg Boss 19	Contestant	13th Place	

=== Music video appearances ===
Year	Title	Singer(s)	Ref.
2025	Jisse Tu Kare Pyaar	Yasser Desai	
2026	Sanam Beraham	Sultana Nooran	
