= MTV Force India The Fast and The Gorgeous =

- Also known as: The Fast and The Gorgeous
- Genre: Reality show
- Presented by: Rannvijay Singh
- Country of origin: India
- Original language: Hindi
- No. of seasons: 1

Production
- Production location: India

Original release
- Network: MTV India

MTV Force India The Fast and The Gorgeous is a reality show on MTV India produced in association with Indian Formula 1 team Force India. The show’s concept was to find four new face of Force India F1 for the 2009 season.

The show was hosted by the VJ Rannvijay Singh.

MTV India did not commission a second series. In 2011, Force India partnered with NDTV Good Times for a second season, presented by Ambika Anand.
