= MTV Stuntmania =

Pulsar MTV Stuntmania is an Indian stunt biking reality show. It first aired in September 2009. The last show was hosted by VJ Rannvijay Singh.

== Hosts ==
- Season 1 – Allan Amin and Deepti Gujral
- Season 2 – Allan Amin and Anushka Manchanda
- Season 3 – VJ Rannvijay
