= MTV Campus Diaries =

Indian digital platform

- Created by: MTV India
- No. of seasons: 4

Production
- Production location: Mumbai, India

Original release
- Network: MTV India

MTV Campus Diaries is a college connect digital platform.

MTV Campus Diaries has been associated with brands like B'Llue Amazon.com and Dell

== Hosts/ VJs ==
- VJ Jose Covaco
- Gurbani Judge
- Gaelyn Mendonca
- Parth Samthaan
- Krissann Barretto
- Varun Sood
- Nikhil Chinapa
- Benafsha Soonawalla
