= Toss (2009 film) =

- Theatrical poster
- Directed by: Ramesh Khatkar
- Written by: Ramesh Khatkar
- Produced by: Mukesh Ramani
- Starring: Ashmit Patel; Madhurima Tuli; Prashant Raj; Rannvijay Singh; Aarti Chhabria
- Cinematography: Anil Akki
- Edited by: Aditya
- Music by: Suhas; Siddharth; Sandesh Shandilya
- Distributed by: INOX
- Release date: 28 August 2009
- Running time: 132 minutes
- Country: India
- Language: Hindi
- Box office: ₹19 lakh

Toss is a 2009 Indian Hindi-language film directed by Ramesh Khatkar. Toss is Rannvijay Singh's debut film.

== Cast ==
- Ashmit Patel as Josh
- Prashant Raj as Samay
- Rannvijay Singh as Ryan
- Aarti Chhabria as Sasha
- Nyra Banerjee as Sherry
- Shruti Gera as Fiona
- Zakir Hussain as Inspector Denzel d'Cunha
- Sushant Singh as Two
- Mahesh Manjrekar as Dada
- Rajpal Yadav as Duffy
- Hardik Sangani as Sadaa

== Soundtrack ==
The soundtrack of Toss consists of 4 songs and two remixes.

1. "Ruppaia"
2. "Meri Khamoshi"
3. "Aish Aish"
4. "Abe Saale"
5. "Chalte Chalo"
6. "Abe Saale" (Remix)
7. "Aish Aish" (Remix)

== Reception ==
Sukanya Verma of Rediff.com in a negative review called the film "a laughable attempt" and felt that the film "is a text-book demonstration of appalling, over-the-top and awful performances. Not one actor in a cast of mostly lesser known faces project anything remotely to an expression." Taran Adarsh of Bollywood Hungama rated the film 1 out of 5 stars, stating, "Debutante director Ramesh Khatkar seems to have concentrated more on making a technically attractive project, instead of telling an absorbing story. Music [Sandesh Shandilya and Siddharth-Suhas] isn't invigorating either. Background score [Ranjit Barot] is far more effective. The visuals [DoP: Anil Akki], of course, are good and that's what you carry home" Shubhra Gupta of The Indian Express gave the film 2 out of 5 stars, stating, "Toss starts off as a dark Bollywood-via-Hollywood thriller, throwing up a few interesting twists off and on. The characters are satisfactorily weird, but the acting, overall, is patchy. It also gets much too stretched, and we can see the twist in the climax long before it comes."
