= Karmma Calling =

2024 Indian primetime drama thriller television series

- Genre: Soap opera Drama; Psychological thriller Mystery; Serial drama
- Created by: Mike Kelley
- Based on: Revenge by Mike Kelley The Count of Monte Cristo by Alexandre Dumas
- Directed by: Ruchi Narain
- Starring: Raveena Tandon; Namrata Sheth; Varun Sood; Vikramjeet Virk
- Country of origin: India
- Original language: Hindi
- No. of seasons: 1
- No. of episodes: 7

Production
- Executive producer: Mike Kelley
- Producer: Ashutosh Shah
- Cinematography: Bhushankumar Jain
- Camera setup: Single-camera
- Running time: 45 minutes
- Production companies: R.A.T Films; ABC Signature

Original release
- Network: Disney+ Hotstar
- Release: 26 January 2024

Related
- Revenge

Karmma Calling (transl. Fate Calling) is an Indian Hindi-language primetime drama thriller television series on Disney+ Hotstar, directed by Ruchi Narain. Produced by Ashutosh Shah under the banner of R.A.T Films and ABC Signature, it stars Raveena Tandon, Namrata Sheth, Varun Sood And Vikramjeet Virk. It is the Indian remake of the ABC TV series Revenge, created by Mike Kelley. The plot is inspired by Alexandre Dumas' 1844 novel The Count of Monte Cristo, and the series premiered on January 26, 2024.

== Premise ==
A young woman, Karma Talwar, poses as a new resident and returns to an affluent beachside town, Alibaug, in order to seek revenge on the families that wronged her father 20 years earlier. In the midst of her plan, she uncovers secrets, lies, and affairs and finds herself in multiple dangerous situations that could tear the beachside town apart.

== Cast ==
- Raveena Tandon as Indrani Kothari
- Namrata Sheth as Karma Talwar/Ambika Mehra
- Varun Sood as Ahaan Kothari
- Vikramjeet Virk as Sameer
- Rachit Singh as Vedang
- Viraf Patel as Zane Khan
- Gaurav Sharma as Kaushal Kothari
- Waluscha De Sousa as Dolly Bhatia
- Devangshi Sen as Mira Kothari
- Piyush Khati as Dash
- Amy Aela as Yana
- Ahmed Masi Wali as Krish
- Rohit Roy as Satyajit Mehra

== Production ==
It is based on Mike Kelley's Revenge. The series was announced on Disney+ Hotstar. Raveena Tandon, Namrata Sheth and Varun Sood were signed as the lead. The teaser of the series was released on December 14, 2023.
