= MTV Roadies: Karm Ya Kaand =

Roadies Karm Ya Kaand
- Season 19
- Presented by: Sonu Sood
- Judges: Gautam Gulati; Prince Narula; Rhea Chakraborty
- No. of contestants: 33
- Winner: Vashu Jain (Gang Reha)
- Runner-up: Siwet Tomar (Gang Prince)
- No. of episodes: 40

Release
- Original network: MTV India
- Original release: 3 June – 15 October 2023

Series chronology
- ← Previous; Season 18 Next → Season 20

MTV Roadies: Karm Ya Kaand (transl. Roadies: Fate Or Scandal) is the nineteenth season of the Indian reality show MTV Roadies produced by Banijay Asia. Hosted by Sonu Sood for the second time, the season premiered on MTV India on 3 June 2023 and digitally streams on JioCinema. It also marks the return of gang leader Prince Narula along with new gang leaders Rhea Chakraborty and Gautam Gulati. The auditions were taken by Sonu Sood, Prince Narula, Rhea Chakraborty & Gautam Gulati.

== Auditions ==
MTV Roadies Karm Ya Kaand auditions were held at Chandigarh on 13 April 2023, Delhi on 15 April 2023, Indore on 20 April 2023, and Pune on 22 April 2023.

The contestants had to get minimum 2 votes from the gang leaders to put themselves in an auction.

- Sonu Sood had special powers,
  - Kaand the contestant gets the choice to choose their Gang Leader as soon as the bid reaches 2000 Roadiums.
  - Sonu Astra the gang leaders have to reverse bid to not have the contestant in their gang, the gang leader who has bid the highest will choose which gang the contestant goes to.
  - Reverse the chance for any gang leader to bid even if they gave red buzzer.

Episode Date	Venue	Contestant	City	Gang Leaders Final Bidding Amount			Sonu's Power	Result	Gang Selected
Episode Date	Venue	Contestant	City	Gautam Gulati	Rhea Chakraborty	Prince Narula	Sonu's Power	Result	Gang Selected
Jun 3	Delhi	Anmol Bakaya	Jammu			0	None	Not selected	
Jun 3	Delhi	Lekha Jambaulikar	Goa	0	1900	2000		Advanced	Prince
Jun 3	Delhi	Prakram Dandona	New Delhi	3400	2600	3300		Advanced	Gautam
Jun 3	Delhi	Bhoomika Vasishth	New Delhi	0	1100	1000	None	Advanced	Rhea
Jun 4	Delhi	Leeza Basumatary	Assam				None	Not selected	
Jun 4	Delhi	Priyanka Choudhary	Jaipur	0	400	500	None	Advanced	Prince
Jun 4	Delhi	Piyu Sharma	Delhi	2500	700	2100		Advanced	Gautam
Jun 4	Delhi	Priyanka Gupta	New Delhi	200	0	100		Advanced	Prince
Jun 4	Delhi	Siwet Tomar	Dehradun	1900	3800	4000		Advanced	Prince
Jun 10	Delhi	Shayan Siddiqui	Lucknow	1100	1500	1300	None	Advanced	Rhea
Jun 10	Delhi	Joginder	Gurgaon	1500	1400	1300		Advanced	Prince
Jun 10	Delhi	Rahul Madan	Roorkee				None	Not selected	
Jun 10	Delhi	Neerja Punia	Gurgaon	200	300	0	None	Advanced	Rhea
Jun 11	Delhi	Abhijeet Singh	Uttar Pradesh				None	Not selected	
Jun 11	Delhi	Shubham Chaudhary	Uttar Pradesh		400	300	None	Advanced	Rhea
Jun 11	Delhi	Pery Sheetal	Delhi	800		900		Advanced	Prince
Jun 11	Delhi	Kanishk Anand	New Delhi				None	Not selected	
Jun 17	Pune	Sachin Sharma	Faridabad	2000	1100	2100		Advanced	Prince
Jun 17	Pune	Yogesh Sharma	Uttar Pradesh	1400	1600	1700	None	Advanced	Prince
Jun 17	Pune	Nejm	Chennai	300	100	0	None	Advanced	Gautam
Jun 17	Pune	Vashu Jain	Bilaspur	4000	4100	2100		Advanced	Prince
Jun 18	Pune	Digvijay Gavhane	Pune				None	Not selected	
Jun 18	Pune	Prem Shilu	Surat	0	200	100		Advanced	Prince
Jun 18	Pune	Abhirup Kadam	Mumbai	1100	1200	1000	None	Advanced	Rhea
Jun 18	Pune	Ashika Surve	Mumbai	2700	2800	2000		Advanced	Prince
Jun 18	Pune	Nayera Ahuja	Bhopal	0	100	0	None	Advanced	Rhea
Jun 24	Indore	Tiger Chopan	Jammu and Kashmir				None	Not selected	
Jun 24	Indore	Vishu Bajaj	New Delhi				None	Not selected	
Jun 24	Indore	Tanu Rawat	Rishikesh	1000	1100	0	None	Advanced	Rhea
Jun 24	Indore	Rajveer Dey	Siliguri	1600		1500	None	Advanced	Gautam
Jun 24	Indore	Bharat Sharma	Himachal Pradesh				None	Not selected	
Jun 25	Indore	Heman Parchani	Gadarwara	3500	3800	1900		Advanced	Rhea
Jun 25	Indore	Hassan Siddiquee	Nashik	1000	900	600	None	Advanced	Gautam
Jun 25	Indore	Addy Jain	New Delhi	2100	3000	2000		Advanced	Prince
Jun 25	Indore	Twinkle Chourasia	Jabalpur	2100	2200	1900		Advanced	Gautam
Jun 25	Indore	Shuly Nadar	Tamil Nadu	3600	4000	1900		Advanced	Rhea
Jul 1	Chandigarh	Samiksha Sharma	Jammu				None	Not selected	
Jul 1	Chandigarh	Rubiya Khan	Kashmir				None	Not selected	
Jul 1	Chandigarh	Manpreet Kaur	Punjab	0	0	0		Advanced	Rhea
Jul 1	Chandigarh	Bhawish Madaan	Amritsar	1700	0		None	Advanced	Gautam
Jul 1	Chandigarh	Rishabh Jaiswal	Varanasi	4800	5000	~~2100~~		Advanced	Rhea
Jul 2	Chandigarh	Rupa Singh	Rewa	1500	1700	1600		Advanced	Gautam
Jul 2	Chandigarh	Himanshu Sharma	Mandsaur				None	Not selected	
Jul 2	Chandigarh	Swati	Sonipat	200	300	0	None	Advanced	Rhea
Jul 2	Chandigarh	Himanshu Arora	Chandigarh	2000	200	300		Advanced	Gautam
Jul 8	Chandigarh	Digvijay Singh Rathee	Haryana	2700	0	0		Advanced	Gautam
Jul 8	Chandigarh	Syed Farhan Ahmed	Chhattisgarh				None	Not selected	
Jul 8	Chandigarh	Himansh Seth	Amritsar				None	Not selected	
Jul 8	Chandigarh	Sourav Singh Rajput	Jamshedpur				None	Not selected	
Jul 9	Chandigarh	Gary Lu	Dehradun	2400		2500		Advanced	Prince
Jul 9	Chandigarh	Navpreet Singh	Delhi				None	Not selected	
Jul 9	Chandigarh	Ashish Jangid	Jaipur				None	Not selected	
Jul 9	Chandigarh	Vyomesh Koul	Kashmir				None	Not selected	
Jul 9	Chandigarh	Pallavi Yadav	Delhi	300	200	0	None	Advanced	Gautam

=== Bonus episode auditions ===
Short bonus episodes were exclusively streaming each week on JioCinema.

Only the selected contestants in the bonus episodes are listed below.

Venue	Contestant	Gang leaders final bidding amount			Sonu's power	Result	Gang selected
Venue	Contestant	Gautam	Rhea	Prince	Sonu's power	Result	Gang selected
Delhi	Akriti Negi	500	0	700	None	Advanced	Prince
Pune	Mallika Motiramani	700		600	None	Advanced	Gautam
Indore	Foram Botadra	200	100	0	None	Advanced	Gautam
Indore	Shruti Parija	1000	800	0	None	Advanced	Gautam

=== Battleground ===
MTV Roadies Battleground, the top five Finalists were chosen by public vote on JioCinema. They competed in two rounds to join the Roadies journey as wild-cards.

Contestant	City	Vote-out	Result	Gang selected
Akriti Negi	Lucknow	Kabir	Nominated	Rhea
Anmol Dhawan	Punjab	Kabir	Nominated	Voted-Out
Kabir Bhalla	New Delhi	Anmol	Voted-Out	
Leeza Basumatary	Assam	Kabir	Advanced	Gautam
Naveen Kumar	Haryana	Akriti	Advanced	Prince

== Gangs ==
=== Roadies selected for the journey ===
Gang Leader		Gautam Gulati	Rhea Chakraborty	Prince Narula
Roadies	1	Prakram Dandona	Bhoomika Vasishth	Lekha Jambaulikar
Roadies	2	Piyu Sharma	Shayan Siddiqui	Priyanka Choudhary
Roadies	3	Nejm	Neerja Punia	Priyanka Gupta
Roadies	4	Mallika Motiramani	Shubham Chaudhary	Siwet Tomar
Roadies	5	Rajveer Dey	Abhirup Kadam	Joginder
Roadies	6	Hassan Siddiquee	Nayera Ahuja	Pery Sheetal
Roadies	7	Twinkle Chourasia	Tanu Rawat	Akriti Negi^{2}
Roadies	8	Foram Botadra	Heman Parchani	~~Sachin Sharma~~^{1}
Roadies	9	Shruti Parija	Shuly Nadar	Yogesh Sharma
Roadies	10	Bhawish Madaan	Manpreet Kaur	Vashu Jain
Roadies	11	Rupa Singh	Rishabh Jaiswal	Prem Shilu
Roadies	12	Himanshu Arora	Swati	Ashika Surve
Roadies	13	Digvijay Singh Rathee	Sachin Sharma	Addy Jain
Roadies	14	Pallavi Yadav		Gary Lu
Battleground	*	Leeza Basumatary	Akriti Negi	Naveen Kumar

indicates Roadies not selected by their gang leaders to go on the journey.

1. Gang leader Rhea chose Sachin Sharma from Gang Prince during Top 10 Selection.
2. Akriti Negi returned during the journey as Battleground Finalist and joined Gang Rhea by surviving a vote-out.

=== Gangs after dissolve ===
Gang leader		Gautam Gulati	Rhea Chakraborty	Prince Narula
Roadies	1	Prakram Dandona	Rishabh Jaiswal	Ashika Surve
Roadies	2	Sachin Sharma	Rajveer Dey	Siwet Tomar
Roadies	3	Joginder	Tanu Rawat	Priyanka Gupta
Roadies	4	Bhoomika Vasishth	Abhirup Kadam	Himanshu Arora
Roadies	5	~~Piyu Sharma~~^{3} Akriti Negi	Shayan Siddiqui	~~Akriti Negi~~; Piyu Sharma
Roadies	6		Pallavi Yadav	Prem Shilu
Roadies	7		Vashu Jain	

1. The favorites had power to choose Kaand and receive immunity for next two vote-outs. Prakram from Gang Gautam picked the Kaand Card and as consequences, gang leader with most Roadiums can swap one Roadie from Gang Gautam. Gang Leader Prince had highest Roadiums and he swapped Piyu with Akriti for his gang.

== Production ==
=== Casting ===
In March 2023, Shiv Thakare, MC Stan and Pratik Sehajpal were approached to be a part of the series as gang leader. In the following month, Sonu Sood returned as host.

In April 2023, Prince Narula was cast as the gang leader and was joined by Gautam Gulati and Rhea Chakraborty.

Ex-Roadie Shiv Thakare came as a guest for an episode during the Auditions. Ashneer Grover came as a guest during the Auditions to help a gang leader with 2000 Roadiums. He teamed up with Prince Narula.

=== Development ===
In March 2023, MTV India announced the series with the tagline 'Karm Ya Kaand'. The journey will begin from Kurukshetra to Kaza.

=== Filming ===
The principal photography of the series commenced in April 2023. The auditions were held in Chandigarh, Delhi, Indore and Pune.

=== Release ===
On 19 March 2023, a promo revealing the season's theme was released on MTV India.

== Soundtrack ==
MTV Roadies Karm Ya Kaand Anthem

Soundtrack album by Super Manikk Wicked Sunny
- Released: 2023
- Genre: Soundtrack
- Length: 1:56
- Language: Hindi
- Label: MTV India

MTV Roadies Karm Ya Kaand Anthem is composed by Super Manikk and Wicked Sunny.

Tracklisting
No.	Title	Singer(s)	Length
1.	"MTV Roadies Karm Ya Kaand Anthem" (Male)	Super Manikk and Wicked Sunny	1:56
Total length:			1:56

== See also ==
- List of programmes broadcast by MTV (India)
