= Varun Sood (actor) =

Indian actor

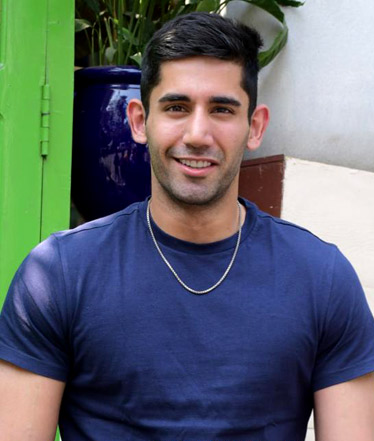
- Sood in 2024
- Born: Calcutta, West Bengal, India
- Occupation: Actor
- Years active: 2015–present
- Known for: MTV Roadies; MTV Splitsvilla; Ace of Space; Karmma Calling; Call Me Bae

Varun Sood is an Indian actor, model and former VJ. He is known for participating in reality shows like MTV Roadies, MTV Splitsvilla, Ace of Space and Khatron Ke Khiladi. He made his acting debut with Ragini MMS: Returns, and is also recognized for his roles in Karmma Calling and Call Me Bae.

== Early life ==
Sood was born in Calcutta (now Kolkata), West Bengal. He grew up in Delhi. His grandfather and father served in the Indian Army, and Varun had initially planned to follow in their footsteps. He completed his primary school education at Army Public School. During his school and college days, he played basketball and shot put, even competing at the national level.

== Personal life ==
In 2017, Sood was dating Benafsha Soonawalla but they broke up soon after Soonawalla's participation in Bigg Boss 11.

In 2018, he started dating Divya Agarwal. They worked together on MTV Roadies, MTV Ace of Space and Ragini MMS: Returns. After four years of relationship, they split in March 2022.

== Career ==
Varun started his career as a fitness trainer, and then went on to become an MTV VJ.

Sood then started participating in reality shows. He has taken part in multiple reality shows so far, including MTV Roadies season 12, MTV Splitsvilla season 9, Ace of Space 1, MTV Roadies: Real Heroes, MTV Roadies season 17 and Fear Factor: Khatron Ke Khiladi 11.

In 2019, he made his acting debut with ALTBalaji's Ragini MMS: Returns as Rahul opposite Divya Agarwal. In 2022, he made a special appearance in Karan Johar's Jugjugg Jeeyo as Gaurav opposite Prajakta Koli. In 2023, he was seen as Jacob in season 2 of Potluck on SonyLIV.

In January 2024, he starred as Ahaan Kothari in Disney+ Hotstar's Karmma Calling alongside Raveena Tandon and Namrata Sheth. Later that year, he appeared in Amazon Prime Video's Naam Namak Nishan opposite Helly Shah, and in Call Me Bae alongside Ananya Panday. He also hosted Reality Ranis Of The Jungle on Discovery Channel.

== Filmography ==
=== Films ===
Year	Title	Role	Notes	Ref.
2022	Jugjugg Jeeyo	Gaurav Kapoor		
2026	Hai Jawani Toh Ishq Hona Hai	Vishal	Cameo	

=== Television ===
Year	Title	Role	Notes	Ref.
2015	MTV Roadies season 12	Contestant	7th place	
2016	MTV Splitsvilla season 9	Contestant	1st runner-up	
2016	MTV Campus Diaries season 4	Host		
2016	NBA Slam	Himself		
2017	MTV Big F season 2	Daljeet	Episode 2	
2018	UCypher	Host		
2018	Box Cricket League season 3	Himself		
2018	Ace of Space 1	Contestant	2nd runner-up	
2019	MTV Roadies: Real Heroes	Roadies Insider		
2020	Ace the Quarantine	Host		
2020–2021	MTV Roadies season 17	Leader	2nd runner-up	
2021	Fear Factor: Khatron Ke Khiladi 11	Contestant	4th place	
2021	Bigg Boss OTT season 1	Himself	Guest	
2024 – 2025	Reality Ranis Of The Jungle	Host		

=== Web series ===
Year	Title	Role	Notes	Ref.
2019	Ragini MMS: Returns	Rahul	Season 2	
2023	Potluck	Jacob	Season 2	
2024	Karmma Calling	Ahaan Kothari		
2024	Naam Namak Nishan	Yuvraj Singh Chauhan		
2024	Call Me Bae	Prince Bhasin		

=== Music videos ===
Year	Title	Singer	Ref.
2019	Naam Ada Likhna	Madhubanti Bagchi, Shreyas Puranik	
2022	Pyaar Ho Gaya	Paras Chopra	

== Awards and nominations ==
Year	Award	Category	Work	Result	Ref.
2024	Filmfare OTT Awards	Best Supporting Actor in a Series (Male): Drama	Karmma Calling	Nominated	
