= NBA Slam =

- Also known as: NBA Slam: This is Why We Play
- Genre: Sport
- Presented by: Rannvijay Singha
- Country of origin: India
- Original languages: Hindi; English

Production
- Producer: Sony SIX Sony ESPN

Original release
- Release: 24 September 2016

NBA Slam is an Indian television show about NBA basketball on the Sony SIX channel. It showcases the abilities and on-court rivalry of two rival NBA star players through the eyes of two Indian celebrity fans. The first episode featured Bollywood actor and VJ Rannvijay Singha and VJ Varun Sood.

== Episodes ==
Episode No.	Episode Name	Celebrity Guest
1	NBA Slam Is Here!	Varun Sood
2	Seth Curry In The House	Seth Curry
3	The D-Wade, DeRozan Debate	Varun Sood
4	Kicking Into High Gear With Robin Lopez	Robin Lopez
5	The Horford-Aldridge Conundrum	Varun Sood
6	NBA Bloopers Edition	Cyrus Broacha
