= Aag (2007 film) =

2007 Indian film by Ram Gopal Varma

Ram Gopal Varma Ki Aag
- Poster
- Directed by: Ram Gopal Varma
- Written by: Sajid-Farhad
- Screenplay by: Rahil Qazi
- Dialogues by: Sajid-Farhad
- Based on: Sholay by Salim–Javed
- Produced by: Ram Gopal Varma
- Starring: Mohanlal; Amitabh Bachchan; Ajay Devgn; Prashant Raj Sachdev; Sushmita Sen
- Cinematography: Amit Roy
- Edited by: Amit Parmar; Nipun Ashok Gupta
- Music by: Songs: Ganesh Hegde; Prasanna Shekhar; Amar Mohile; Score: Amar Mohile
- Production company: RGV Film Factory
- Distributed by: Adlabs
- Release date: 31 August 2007
- Running time: 171 minutes
- Country: India
- Language: Hindi

Ram Gopal Varma Ki Aag (transl. Ram Gopal Varma's Fire), or simply Aag (transl. Fire), is a 2007 Indian Hindi-language action film produced and directed by Ram Gopal Varma. The film features Mohanlal, Amitabh Bachchan, Ajay Devgn, Prashant Raj Sachdev, Sushmita Sen, J. D. Chakravarthy, and Suchitra Krishnamoorthi in principal roles.

The film is an adaptation of 1975 Hindi film Sholay. Upon release, it was panned by critics, and has subsequently been considered to be one of the worst films ever made.

== Plot ==
Nashik-based Heerendra Dhaan and Raj Ranade are bodyguards of a politician, but after their employer is implicated in a scam, they end up assaulting a police officer and flee to Mumbai. Once there, they meet with Rambhabhai who, in turn, gets them employed with a gangster named Shambhu. After a short while the duo is apprehended by Police Inspector Narsimha, questioned, and after they agree to cooperate to bring down Shambhu, they will be let go. The two succeed in assisting the police arrest Shambhu, but they themselves are arrested, tried in Court, and sentenced to a year in jail.

After their discharge, they are again approached by Inspector Narsimha, who, this time, wants to recruit them to capture and kill dreaded bandit Babban Singh. Babban Singh had slaughtered his wife, Kavita and son, Subbu, as well as cut his fingers off. He had done this as revenge for killing his brother, whom he really loved, and for having him sent to jail. Heerendra and Raj agree to carry out this task for 8 Lakh Rupees. They re-locate to Kaliganj, where Heerendra falls in love with an auto-rickshaw driver, Ghungroo, while Raj gives his heart to Subbu's widow, Durga. They then set out to capture Babban and meet with some success during Diwali, but Babban manages to escape. Babban then starts to ambush and kill the Kaliganj residents to compel them to surrender the duo to him.

Raj and Heerendra give in and meet Babban's henchmen in an abandoned building. They fight the goons, but Raj is killed in the process. Babban's right-hand man, Tambe, is badly injured, and later on, killed by Babban for failing. Babban has a final encounter with Heerendra and Inspector Narsimha, where Heerendra was about to kill him, but Inspector Narsimha tells him to spare and let the law decide his fate. However, Babban tries to escape, and he's shot dead (it is unclear as to who shot him since Heerendra was told not to kill him and Inspector Narsimha does not have fingers). The film ends with Heerendra getting arrested and Inspector Narsimha apologizing to everyone about it.

== Cast ==
- Mohanlal as Inspector Narasimha
- Amitabh Bachchan as Babban Singh "Babban"
- Ajay Devgn as Heerendra 'Heero' Chavan
- Prashant Raj Sachdev as Raj Ranade
- Sushmita Sen as Durga Devi
- Sushant Singh as Tambe
- Priyanka Kothari as Ghungroo
- Rajpal Yadav as Rambhabhai
- Malkeet Singh as Ghasti Sharma
- Suchitra Krishnamoorthi as Kavita
- J. D. Chakravarthy as Subbu
- Ravi Kale as Pradhan
- D. Santosh as Coolie
- Jeeva as Dhaania
- Abhishek Bachchan as Gypsy Singer (special appearance)
- Urmila Matondkar as Gypsy Dancer (special appearance)
- Sachin Pilgaonkar as Ambar (Babban's brother) (special appearance)

== Soundtrack ==
The film's music was composed by Ganesh Hegde, Amar Mohile, and Prasanna Shekhar.

Aag

Soundtrack album by Ganesh Hegde, Amar Mohile, Prasanna Shekhar
- Released: 2007
- Genre: Feature film soundtrack
- Language: Hindi
- Label: T-Series

No.	Title	Lyrics	Music	Singer(s)	Length
1.	"Mehbooba Mehbooba"	Shabbir Ahmed	Ganesh Hegde	Amitabh Bachchan, Sukhwinder Singh, Sunidhi Chauhan
2.	"Ruk Ja"	Sajid-Farhad	Amar Mohile	Sunidhi Chauhan, Vinod Rathod
3.	"Holi"	Sarim Momin	Prasanna Shekhar	Farhad Bhiwandiwala, Ravindra Upadhyay, Shreya Ghoshal, Shweta Pandit, Sudesh Bhosle
4.	"Cha Raha"			Shweta Pandit, Vinod Rathod
5.	"Hai Aag Yeh"	Sarim Momin	Amar Mohile	Sunidhi Chauhan
6.	"Jee Le"	Sajid-Farhad	Prasanna Shekhar	Farhad Bhiwandiwala, Vinod Rathod
7.	"Dum"	Sarim Momin	Amar Mohile	Vinod Rathod
8.	"Hai Aag Yeh" (Instrumental)		Amar Mohile

== Copyright infringement suit ==
The Delhi High Court fined Ram Gopal Varma ₹1 million (US$10,000) for the "deliberate act" of copyright infringement for the usage of characters such as "Gabbar Singh" of original Sholay.

== Reception ==
The film was panned by critics and audiences. Rajeev Masand rated it zero out of five. The Times of India stated that Aag "destroyed Bollywood's greatest film" and acknowledged that some "consider it the world's worst film." Hindustan Times awarded it the "Lifetime's Worst Ever Movie Award." It came in first in a FHM India list of the 57 worst movies ever made. Total Film included it in their list of the 66 worst films of all time. Amitabh Bachchan later admitted that the film was "a mistake."

== See also ==
- List of 21st-century films considered the worst
