= Khatron Ke Khiladi 4 =

Fear Factor: Khatron Ke Khiladi
- Season 4
- Title screen
- Presented by: Akshay Kumar
- No. of contestants: 13
- Winner: Aarti Chhabria
- Runner-up: Mauli Dave
- No. of episodes: 16

Release
- Original network: Colors TV
- Original release: 3 June – 23 July 2011

Season chronology
- ← Previous; Season 3 Next → Season 5

Fear Factor: Khatron Ke Khiladi Torchaar 4 is the fourth season of India's stunt/action reality game show. Khatron Ke Khiladi (TV series), based on the American Fear Factor. Hosted by Akshay Kumar, the series premiered on Colors TV. Aarti Chhabria was declared the winner of the show.

== Contestants ==
Contestant	Occupation	Partner	Status	Place	Ref
Aarti Chabria	Actress, model	Dhaval Thakur	Eliminated	1	
Aarti Chabria	Actress, model	Dhaval Thakur	Eliminated	1	
Aarti Chabria	Actress, model	Dhaval Thakur	Winner	1	
Mauli Dave	Singer, dancer, host, actress	Dhiraj Amonkar	1st runner-up	2	
Diandra Soares	Model fashion designer, actress	Arhan Choudhry	2nd runner-up	3	
Dina Singh	Actress	Pramod Dahiya	Eliminated	4	
Mia Uyeda	Actress, Model, VJ, Columnist	Sangram Singh	Eliminated	5	
Alesia Raut	Actress, Model	Shashwat Seth	Eliminated	8	
Aashka Goradia	Actress, Model	Sunit Bhatia	Eliminated	7	
Poonam Pandey	Actress, Model	Praveen Jain	Eliminated	11	
Poonam Pandey	Actress, Model	Praveen Jain	Eliminated	11	
Anjum Chopra	Cricketer	Sandeep Sachdev	Eliminated	6	
Bani J	Model, VJ, Television host	Amit Mehra	Eliminated	9	
Kashmera Shah	Actress	Sumit Suri	Eliminated	10	
Smita Bansal	Actress	Saurabbh Roy	Eliminated	12	
Sambhavna Seth	Actress, Dancer	Khalid Chowdhary	Eliminated	13	

Indicates original entrants
Indicates re-entered entrants
