= Rannvijay Singha =

Indian actor, television personality and VJ (b. 1983)

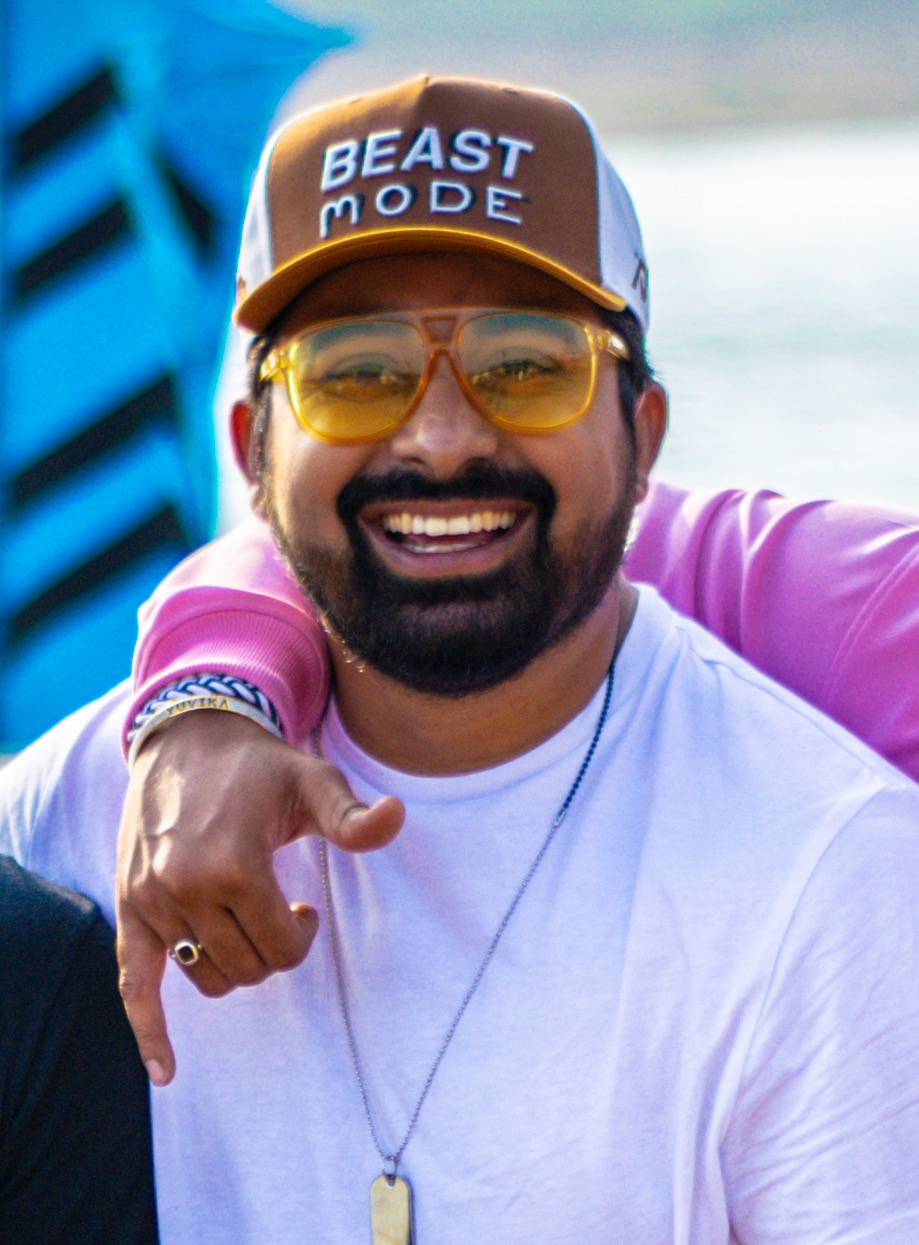
- Rannvijay in 2019
- Born: Jalandhar, Punjab, India
- Occupations: Actor; television personality; host; VJ
- Known for: MTV Roadies; MTV Splitsvilla
- Spouse: Priyanka Vohra (m. 2014)
- Children: 2

Rannvijay Singha is an Indian film actor, television personality, host, and VJ. He is known for his role in MTV Roadies. He was a part of the show from 2004 to 2020, earlier as a gang leader and then as a host. He was also a part of the auditions judging panel from season 8 to season 18 and a gang leader.

He made his Bollywood debut in Toss: A Flip of Destiny (2009). Rannvijay has also acted in London Dreams (2009) and Action Replayy (2010). Singha made his Punjabi movie debut in 2011, starring in Jimmy Shergill's Dharti.

== Early life ==
Singha's father, Iqbal Singh Singha is a retired Lt. General of the Indian Army and his mother Baljeet Kaur is a housewife. Despite his father's retirement, he is currently posted in Syria as the UN Force Commander; his mother is a poet in her own right. Owing to his father's transferable jobs across India, he went to nine different schools. Finally, he graduated from Army Public School, Dhaula Kuan, New Delhi. He also attended Hansraj College (the University of Delhi and graduated with a B. Com hons). He wanted to win the Hero Honda Karizma R. Singh used to work for a construction worker in New Jersey, United States. His younger brother Harman Singha is also an actor, VJ and television personality. Singha is the only exception in his family not to serve in the Indian military as his family has been serving in the Indian military for six generations.

== Personal life ==
Rannvijay married Priyanka Vohra on 10 April 2014. The couple has a daughter named Kainaat who was born on 17 January 2017. In March 2021, Singha and his wife Priyanka announced that they were expecting their second child, a son named Jahaanvir.

Rannvijay is a comics and bikes fan and is known for collecting Wolverine and Batman merchandises, he owns Suzuki GSX-R600, Kawasaki Ninja, Hero Honda Karizma R and Royal Enfield. He is a Warriors fan. He is also a football enthusiast, and became co-owner of then I-League club Minerva Punjab in October 2017.

== Career ==
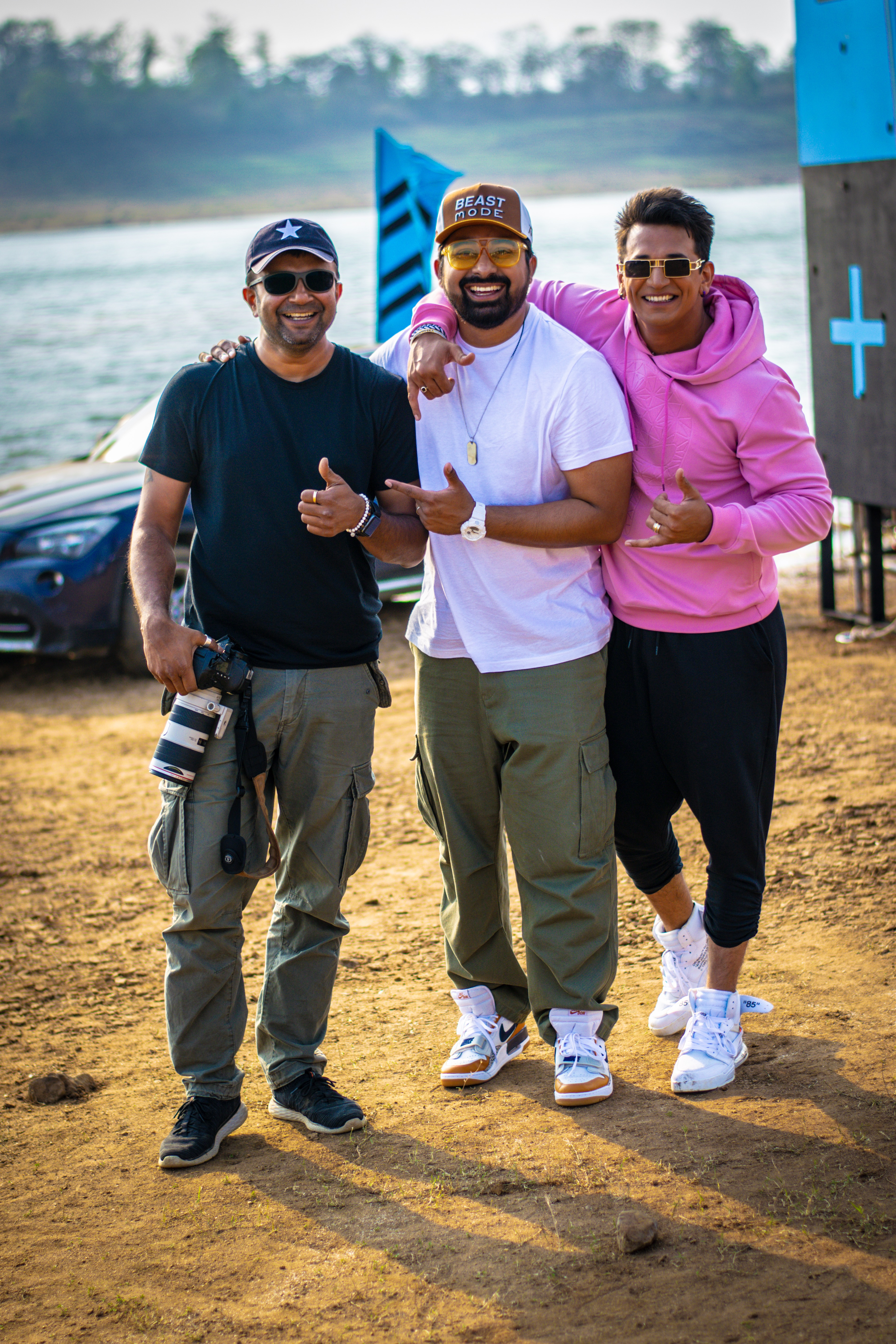
Singha with Ashish Parmar and Prince Narula at the shoot of MTV Roadies.

=== MTV India ===
Singha appeared in the first season of MTV Roadies and further hosted all the seasons from 2.0 to Roadies Revolution. He has also hosted other MTV shows, such as MTV Stuntmania, MTV Force India The Fast and The Gorgeous, MTV Splitsvilla, MTV Scooty Pep Diva and MTV Troll Police. He took an exit from the MTV Roadies.

=== Film career ===
Rannvijay made his Bollywood debut in Toss: A Flip of Destiny in 2009. He then acted in London Dreams along with Ajay Devgn and Salman Khan. He further appeared in Action Replayy in 2011. He made his Punjabi cinema debut in 2011, starring in Jimmy Shergill's Dharti. He also acted in the horror film "3 AM".

== Filmography ==
=== Films ===
Year	Title	Role	Notes
2009	Toss: A Flip of Destiny	Ryan	Film debut
2009	London Dreams	Wasim Hayaat Khan	
2010	Action Replayy	Kundanlal Kapoor	
2011	Mumbai Cutting	Himself	
2011	Dharti	Rannvijay	Punjabi language film
2011	Mod	Andy/Abhay	
2012	Taur Mittran Di	Ranbir	Punjabi language film
2013	Saadi Love Story	Vikram	Punjabi language film; Cameo
2013	Ishq Garaari		Punjabi language film
2014	3 A.M. A Paranormal Experience	Sunny	
2015	Sharafat Gayi Tel Lene	Sam	

=== Television ===
Year	Title	Role	Notes
2003	MTV Roadies 1	Contestant	
2004–2021; 2025	MTV Roadies	Gang Leader/Host	
2008; 2015–2021	MTV Splitsvilla	Host	
2009	MTV Force India The Fast and The Gorgeous	Host	
2013	MTV Rann VJ Run	Himself	
2011	MTV Stuntmania	Host	
2014	Pukaar	Major Rajveer Shergill	
2014	Savdhaan India	Presenter	
2014–2016	Box Cricket League	Contestant	
2017	Himalaya Roadies	Himself	Guest
2018	MTV Troll Police	Host/presenter	
2020	Forbidden Love	ACP Aditya	Episode: "Diagnosis Of Love"
2020–present	Mismatched	Professor Siddharth Sinha	
2021–2022	Shark Tank India	Host	
2023	IRL - In Real Life	Host	
2025	Chhoriyan Chali Gaon	Host	
2025	Do You Wanna Partner	Kabir	
2026	Kohrra S2	Sam	
