= Prince Narula =

Indian model, actor, and singer (born 1990)

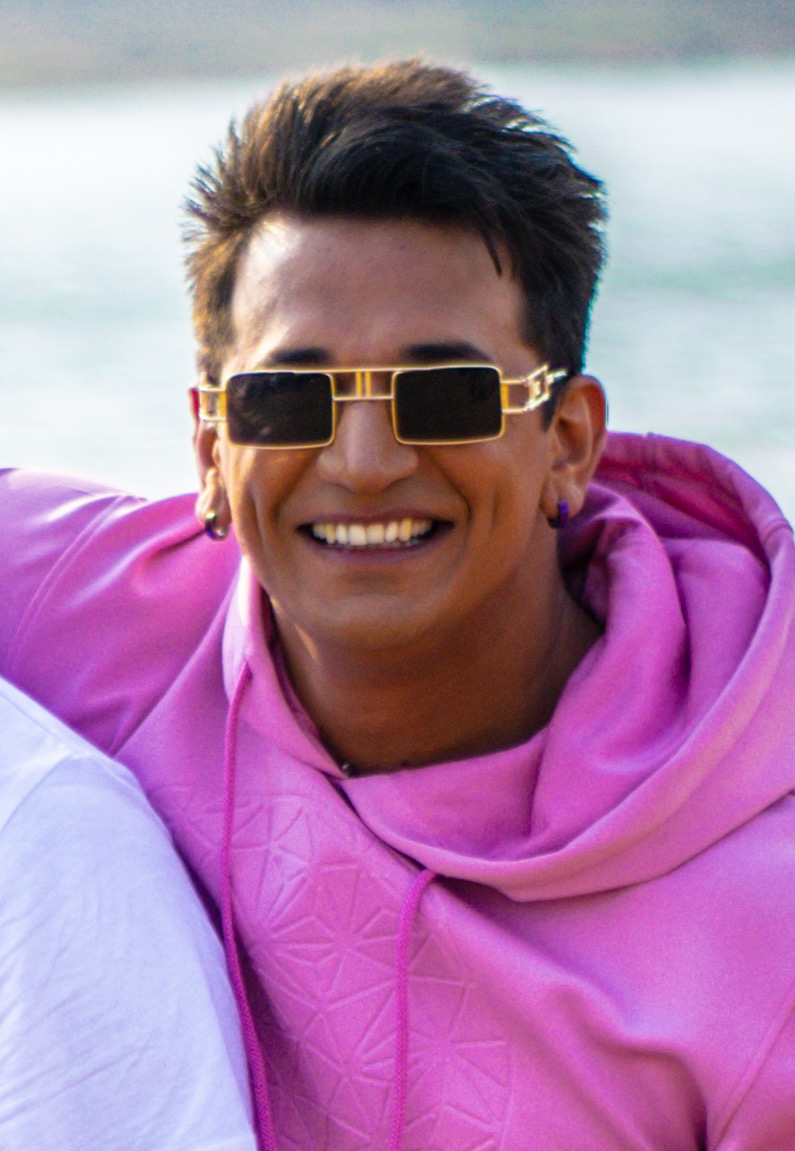
- Narula in 2019
- Born: Braveen Narula; 24 November 1990 (age 35); Chandigarh, India
- Occupations: Model; actor; television personality; singer
- Years active: 2014–present
- Spouse: Yuvika Chaudhary (m. 2018)
- Children: 1

Prince Narula (born Braveen Narula; 24 November 1990) is an Indian model, actor and a singer. Predominantly known for his performance in reality shows, he has also acted in fiction serials. Narula has won the reality TV shows MTV Roadies 12 (2015), MTV Splitsvilla 8 (2015), Bigg Boss 9 (2015–2016) and Nach Baliye 9 (2019). He also appeared as the wrestler Lakhan "Lucky" Singh Ahlawat in Badho Bahu (2016–2018) and as Shahnawaz "Shaan" Ali in Naagin 3 (2018).

== Personal life ==
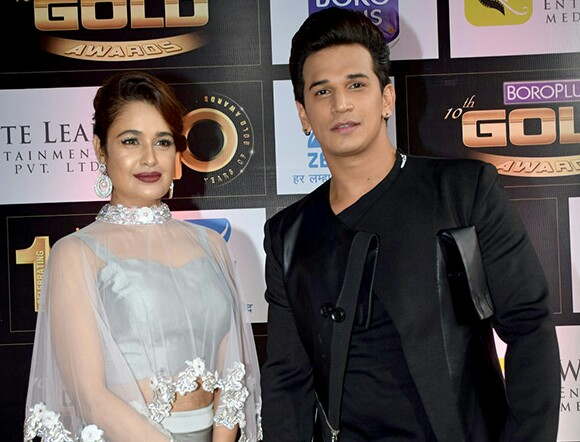
Narula with wife Yuvika Chaudhary

Prince Narula was born as Braveen Narula on 24 November 1990. He hails from Chandigarh, India. He met Yuvika Chaudhary when he participated in Bigg Boss 9. They got married on 12 October 2018 in Mumbai. The couple welcomed their first child, a girl, on 19 October 2024 via IVF.

== Career ==
Narula started off in 2014 by participating in PTC Punjabi's Mr. Punjab where he finished as the second runner up. In 2015, he participated in MTV India's Roadies X2 where he emerged as the winner. Next, he participated in Splitsvilla 8 where he was declared the winner. In October 2015, Narula participated in Colors TV's Bigg Boss 9 and emerged as the winner again, thus marking a hat-trick of back-to-back wins.

From 2016 to 2018, he portrayed Lakhan Singh Ahlawat in &TV's Badho Bahu. Since 2016, Narula has also been a Gang Leader in MTV Roadies.

In 2018, he played Aryan in Laal Ishq opposite Yuvika Chaudhary. Next, he portrayed Shahnawaz in Colors TV's Naagin 3.

In 2019, Narula made his digital debut with ZEE5's Bombers as Bali. Next, he participated in Star Plus's Nach Baliye 9 with Yuvika Chaudhary, finishing as the winner thus winning four consecutive reality shows.

== Filmography ==
=== Television ===
Year	Title	Role	Notes	Ref(s)
2015	MTV Roadies 12	Contestant	Winner	
2015	MTV Splitsvilla 8	Contestant	Winner	
2015–2016	Bigg Boss 9	Contestant	Winner	
2016	Box Cricket League 2	Contestant		
2016	MTV Roadies 13	Gang Leader	1st Runner Up	
2016–2017	Pyaar Tune Kya Kiya 9	Host		
2016–2018	Badho Bahu	Lakhan "Lucky" Singh Ahlawat		
2017	MTV Roadies 14	Gang Leader	1st Runner Up	
2018	MTV Roadies 15	Gang Leader	1st Runner Up	
2018	Laal Ishq	Aryan		
2018	Naagin 3	Shahnawaz "Shaan" Ali		
2019	Nach Baliye 9	Contestant	Winner	
2019	MTV Roadies 16	Gang Leader	1st Runner Up	
2020	MTV Roadies 17	Gang Leader		
2023	MTV Roadies 19	Gang Leader	1st Runner Up	
2024-25	MTV Roadies 20	Gang Leader	1st Runner Up	
2026	The 50	Contestant		

=== Special appearances ===
Year	Show	Role	Ref.
2016	Comedy Nights Bachao	Himself	
2016	Gangaa	Himself	
2016	Yeh Kahan Aa Gaye Hum	Himself	
2016	Waaris	Himself	
2016	Santoshi Maa	Himself	
2017	MTV Splitsvilla 10	Himself	
2018	Ace of Space 1	Himself	
2019	Kitchen Champion 5	Himself	
2019	MTV Love School 4	Himself	
2019	MTV Splitsvilla 12	Himself	
2019	Ace of Space 2	Himself	
2019	Khatra Khatra Khatra	Himself	
2022	Lock Upp 1	Himself	

=== Web series ===
Year	Title	Role	Ref.
2019	Bombers	Bali	

=== Music videos ===
==== Singles ====
Year	Title	Co-singer	Ref.
2017	Hello Hello	Yuvika Chaudhary	
2017	Zero Figure Tera	N/A	
2018	Burnout	N/A	
2019	Jai Veeru	Suyyash Rai	
2020	Shikayat	Ved Sharma	
2020	Fall	N/A	
2021	Roadies Anthem	N/A	
2021	Pyar Hoya Ae	Zehan	
2021	Melody	Jaymeet	
2022	Sakhiyo	Zehan	
2022	Tera Mera Naam	Zehan	
2022	Kafla	Ashu Sidhu	
2022	Zindagi	Afsana Khan	
2022	Todh	Munawar Faruqui	
2022	Khulle Kharche	Raftaar, Parmish Verma	
2023	Outta Reach	GD 47	
2023	Haule Haule	Renuka Panwar, Raja	
2023	Tiki Tiki Raat	Yuvika Chaudhary	

==== Guest appearances ====
Year	Title	Singer(s)	Ref.
2018	Kalesh	Millind Gaba, Mika Singh	
2019	Goldy Golden	Star Boy LOC	

== Awards and nominations ==
Year	Award	Category	Work	Result	Ref.
2020	Gold Glam and Style Awards	Stylish Couple (With Yuvika Chaudhary)	—N/a	Won	
