= MTV Roadies =

Indian reality show

- Genre: Reality
- Created by: Salar Johar
- Presented by: Cyrus Sahukar (2003); Rannvijay Singha (2004–2012, 2018–2020, 2025–present); Bani J (2009–2010, 2013–2015); Gaelyn Mendonca (2016–2017); Sonu Sood (2022–2023)
- Judges: see below
- Country of origin: India
- Original language: Hindi
- No. of seasons: 21

Production
- Executive producers: Nikhil J Alva; Niret Alva; Raghu Ram; Rajiv Ram
- Production companies: Miditech Studios (2003–2005); Colosceum Media (2010–2021, 2025–present); Pippip Media (2022); Banijay Asia (2023)

Original release
- Network: MTV India
- Release: 15 August 2003 – present

MTV Roadies is an Indian reality television series. It premiered on 15 August 2003 on MTV India and is also digitally available on JioHotstar.

Following the auditions, a group of contestants travel to different destinations and participate in various tasks that challenge their physical, social and mental strength.

== Overview ==
The Roadies format was created by Nikhil J. Alva, founder of Miditech Studios, which produced the first two seasons of the show. Initially, Alva conceptualized Roadies as a platform to unite Indian youth through social work and acts of kindness while traveling across India.

As the show's popularity grew, MTV took over the production from Miditech after the second season. Former Miditech employees Raghu Ram and Rajiv Lakshman were brought in to present the show. Under their guidance, Roadies shifted from its original social-oriented concept to a more intense and confrontational format. They continued with the show until the eleventh season, after which they exited. In an interview, Raghu and Rajiv stated that they had done enough to popularize the show and wanted to give the new generation a chance to take it forward.

Roadies is one of India's longest-running reality shows.

== Format ==
The first two seasons had a daily budget cap for contestants, encouraging them to experience India's diversity while completing various tasks. However, after MTV took over in the third season, the show adopted a more competitive and aggressive format.

From the fourth season, a new segment was introduced to select wild card contestants, Battleground (2006–2009, 2014–present) and Graveyard (2010–2011, 2013–2014).

In the fifth season, advantage tasks were introduced, allowing winners to gain benefits during vote-outs (e.g., multiple votes or sole voting power). It was also the first season where Roadies traveled international during journeys.

The tenth season featured a mentor-based competition, where a team of ex-contestants led by Raghu Ram competed against a team of new contestants mentored by Rannvijay Singha.

In the twelfth season, the format was revamped with the introduction of gang leaders.

The eighteenth season introduced a "buddy pairs" format, where ex-roadies and new contestants competed. It also marked the return of bikes, which had been a key feature in earlier seasons.

The twenty first season featured OGs v/s NewGs gang leader format.

Each season follows a theme and includes various twists, vote-outs, and eliminations. The contestant who survives all challenges and vote-outs is ultimately crowned the Ultimate Roadie in the finale.

== Series synopses ==
Season	Year	Title	Host(s)	Gang Leaders	Originally Released		Episodes		Contestants	Destination(s)	Prize	Winner	Runner-up
Season	Year	Title	Host(s)	Gang Leaders	First Released	Last Released	Episodes		Contestants	Destination(s)	Prize	Winner	Runner-up
1	2003	Roadies - Challenges Har Kadam Par	Cyrus Sahukar	None	15 August 2003	8 November 2003	27		7	India (Chennai – Chail)	—N/a	—N/a	—N/a
2	2004–05	Roadies - Returns	Rannvijay Singha	None	21 August 2004	12 March 2005	30		7	India (Kolkata – Wagah Border)	₹5,00,000	Ayushmann Khurrana	Candy Brar
3	2005-2006	Roadies - Triple The Danger	Rannvijay Singha	None	11 November 2005	3 February 2006	17		13	India (Jaisalmer – Leh)	₹4,87,000	Parul Shahi	Rahul Sharma
4	2006–07	Roadies - Road To Fear	Rannvijay Singha	None	11 November 2006	3 March 2007	17		13	India	₹3,75,500	Anthony Yeh	Gurbani Judge
5	2007–08	Roadies 5.0	Rannvijay Singha	None	28 October 2007	13 January 2008	20		13	India; Thailand; Malaysia	₹2,30,000	Ashutosh Kaushik	Nihal Nikam
6	2008–09	Roadies - Hell Down Under	Rannvijay Singha	None	29 November 2008	26 April 2009	21		20	India; Australia	₹3,62,000	Nauman Sait	Lonkiri "Kiri" Timung
7	2009–10	Roadies - 7 Deadly Sins & 1 Wild Safari	Rannvijay Singha Bani J	None	8 November 2009	25 June 2010	22		15	India; Kenya; Egypt	₹90,000	Anwar Syed	Zaid Bin Nazir
8	2011	Roadies - Shortcut to Hell	Rannvijay Singha	None	19 January 2011	18 June 2011	28		13	India; Brazil	₹4,00,000	Aanchal Khurana	Mohit Saggar
9	2012	Roadies - Everything or Nothing	Rannvijay Singha	None	7 January 2012	30 June 2012	27		13	India; United States	₹6,17,000	Vikas Khoker	Himani Sharma
10	2013	Roadies X - Battle for Glory	Bani J	Raghu Ram Rannvijay Singha	19 January 2013	11 May 2013	17		16	India	₹4,50,000	Palak Johal (Gang Raghu)	Ramandeep Kaur Dhillon (Gang Rannvijay)
11	2014	Roadies X1 - Ride for Respect	Bani J	None	25 January 2014	18 May 2014	18		15	India	₹3,20,000	Nikhil Sachdeva	Utkarsh Khanna
12	2015	Roadies X2 - Your Road, Your Gang	Bani J	Esha Deol Karan Kundra Rannvijay Singha Vijender Singh	26 January 2015	27 June 2015	22		22	India; Nepal	₹5,00,000	Prince Narula (Gang Rannvijay)	Gurmeet Singh Rehal (Gang Vijender)
13	2016	Roadies X4 - Your Gang, Your Glory	Gaelyn Mendonca	Karan Kundra Neha Dhupia Rannvijay Singha Sushil Kumar; Prince Narula (Note: Prince Narula replaced Sushil Kumar for journey due to Kumar leaving the show for his wrestling training.)	20 February 2016	19 June 2016	24		22	India; Bhutan	—N/a	Balraj Singh Khehra (Gang Karan)	Navdeesh Singh Arora (Gang Prince)
14	2017	Roadies - Rising	Gaelyn Mendonca	Harbhajan Singh (Note: Singh was introduced as 'Googly Master') Karan Kundra (Note: Nikhil Chinapa replaced Karan Kundra for journey after Kundra left the show due to work commitments.); Nikhil Chinapa Neha Dhupia Prince Narula Rannvijay Singha	25 February 2017	22 July 2017	26		22	India	—N/a	Shweta Mehta (Gang Neha)	Baseer Ali (Gang Prince)
15	2018	Roadies - Xtreme	Rannvijay Singha	Neha Dhupia Nikhil Chinapa Prince Narula Raftaar	18 February 2018	4 August 2018	28		24	India	—N/a	Kashish Thakur (Gang Neha)	Preeti Kuntal (Gang Prince)
16	2019	Roadies - Real Heroes	Rannvijay Singha	Neha Dhupia Nikhil Chinapa Prince Narula Raftaar Sandeep Singh	10 February 2019	18 August 2019	28		27	India	—N/a	Arun Sharma (Gang Raftaar)	Ankita Pathak (Gang Prince)
17	2020–21	Roadies - Revolution	Rannvijay Singha	Neha Dhupia Nikhil Chinapa Prince Narula Raftaar; Varun Sood (Note: Varun Sood substitute Raftaar as gang leader during journey after he leaves for few days due to work commitments. Later he replaced him due to Raftaar being medically unfit.)	15 February 2020	21 March 2020	6	36	25	India	₹3,00,000	Hamid Barkzi (Gang Nikhil)	Michael Ajay (Gang Nikhil)
17	2020–21	Roadies - Revolution	Rannvijay Singha	Neha Dhupia Nikhil Chinapa Prince Narula Raftaar; Varun Sood	27 June 2020	16 January 2021	30	36	25	India	₹3,00,000	Hamid Barkzi (Gang Nikhil)	Michael Ajay (Gang Nikhil)
18	2022	Roadies - Journey in South Africa	Sonu Sood	None	8 April 2022	10 July 2022	34		20	South Africa	₹10,00,000	Ashish Bhatia Nandini G	Jashwanth Bopanna Yukti Arora
19	2023	Roadies - Karm Ya Kaand	Sonu Sood	Gautam Gulati Prince Narula Rhea Chakraborty	3 June 2023	15 October 2023	40		33	India	₹6,00,000	Vashu Jain (Gang Rhea)	Siwet Tomar (Gang Prince)
20	2025	Roadies - Double Cross	Rannvijay Singha	Elvish Yadav Neha Dhupia Prince Narula Rhea Chakraborty Gautam Gulati (Note: Gulati entered as wildcard gang leader mid-journey.)	11 January 2025	1 June 2025	42		37	India	₹10,00,000	Kushal "Gullu" Tanwar (Gang Elvish)	Hartaaj Veer Singh Gill (Gang Prince)
21	2026–27	Roadies - Rebirth	Rannvijay Singha	Abhishek Malhan Bani J Baseer Ali Neha Dhupia Nikhil Chinapa Prince Narula Raghu Ram (Note: Ram was introduced as the 'OG Judge'.)	16 October 2026	TBA	TBA		TBA	TBA	TBA	TBA	TBA

== Season 1 ==
Roadies - Challenges Har Kadam Par
- Season 1
- Presented by: Cyrus Sahukar
- No. of contestants: 7
- Location: India
- No. of episodes: 27

Release
- Original network: MTV India
- Original release: 15 August – 8 November 2003

Series chronology
- Next → Season 2

Roadies - Challenges Har Kadam Par is the first season MTV Roadies. It premiered on 15 August 2003 and concluded on 8 November 2003.

Contestants	Age	Hometown	Status
Natasha Gulati	21	Delhi	Completed the journey; received a Hero Honda Karizma Bike
Ranjit Bajaj	24	Chandigarh	Completed the journey; received a Hero Honda Karizma Bike
Rannvijay Singha	20	Delhi	Completed the journey; received a Hero Honda Karizma Bike
Tony Kordelia	20	Pune	Completed the journey; received a Hero Honda Karizma Bike
Mini Goel	19	Chandigarh	5th Place
Iqnoor Bains	21	Rajpura	6th Place
Divya Shukla	18	Bangalore	7th Place

== Season 2 ==
Roadies - Returns
- Season 2
- Presented by: Rannvijay Singha
- No. of contestants: 7
- Winner: Ayushmann Khurrana
- Runner-up: Candy Brar
- Location: India
- No. of episodes: 30

Release
- Original network: MTV India
- Original release: 21 August 2004 – 12 March 2005

Series chronology
- ← Previous; Season 1 Next → Season 3

Roadies - Returns is the second season MTV Roadies. It premiered on 21 August 2004 and concluded on 12 March 2005.

Contestants	Status
Ayushmann Khurrana	Winner
Candy Brar	Runner-up
Varun Agarwal	3rd place
Shalin Bhanot	4th place
Neha Bhatia	5th place
Aarti Seth	6th place
Vinod Rawat	7th place

== Season 3 ==
Roadies - Triple The Danger
- Season 3
- Presented by: Rannvijay Singha
- No. of contestants: 13
- Winner: Parul Shahi
- Runner-up: Rahul Sharma
- Location: India
- No. of episodes: 17

Release
- Original network: MTV India
- Original release: 11 November 2005 – 3 February 2006

Series chronology
- ← Previous; Season 2 Next → Season 4

Roadies - Triple The Danger is the third season MTV Roadies. It premiered on 11 November 2005 and concluded on 3 February 2006.

Contestants	Status
Parul Shahi	Winner
Rahul Sharma	Runner-up
Shubhi Mehta	3rd place
Anuj Sachdeva	4th place
Priyanka Bhau	5th place
Stuti Nagpal	6th place
Abhijeet Ghosh	7th place
Krishnesh Nayak	8th place
Sonia Clark	9th place
Amitinder S. Deepak	10th place
Meher Ahmed	11th place
Laveen Bhardwaj	12th place
Shubendru Sood	13th place

== Season 4 ==
Roadies - Road To Fear
- Season 4
- Presented by: Rannvijay Singha
- Judges: Nikhil Chinapa; Raghu Ram
- No. of contestants: 13
- Winner: Anthony Yeh
- Runner-up: Gurbani Judge
- Location: India
- No. of episodes: 17

Release
- Original network: MTV India
- Original release: 11 November 2006 – 3 March 2007

Series chronology
- ← Previous; Season 3 Next → Season 5

Roadies - Road To Fear is the fourth season MTV Roadies. It premiered on 11 November 2006 and concluded on 3 March 2007.

Roadies auditions were held in Delhi, Chandigarh, Kolkata, Mumbai and for the first time, Lucknow.
Gulshan Grover made special appearances to introduce twists during the journey.

Contestants	Status
Anthony Yeh	Winner
Gurbani Judge	Runner-up
Raj Roy	3rd place
Roopali Anand	4th place
Poonam Thacker	5th place
Sahil Anand	6th place
Rishabh Dhir	7th place
Sonam Gupta	8th place
Swati Ahuja	9th place
Vishal Karwal	10th place
Shaleen Malhotra	11th place
Ankit Mohan	12th place
Amandeep "Oorja" Narang	13th place

== Season 5 ==
Roadies 5.0
- Season 5
- Presented by: Rannvijay Singha
- Judges: Nikhil Chinapa; Raghu Ram
- No. of contestants: 13
- Winner: Ashutosh Kaushik
- Runner-up: Nihal Nikam
- Location: India; Thailand; Malaysia
- No. of episodes: 20

Release
- Original network: MTV India
- Original release: 28 October 2007 – 13 January 2008

Series chronology
- ← Previous; Season 4 Next → Season 6

Roadies 5.0 is the fifth season MTV Roadies. It premiered on 28 October 2007 and concluded on 13 January 2008.

Contestants	Status
Ashutosh Kaushik	Winner
Nihal Nikam	Runner-up
Sonel Singh	3rd place
Ankita "Simron" Sehgal	4th place
Prabhjot Virk	5th place
Vibhor Gupta	6th place
Varun Saini	7th place
Shambhavi Sharma	8th place
Ayaz Ahmed	9th place
Anmol Singh	10th place
Ankita Bajaj	11th place
Snehashish Das	12th place
Vikrant Rathore	13th place

== Season 6 ==
Roadies - Hell Down Under
- Season 6
- Presented by: Rannvijay Singh
- Judges: Raghu Ram; Rajiv Laxman
- No. of contestants: 20
- Winner: Nauman Sait
- Runner-up: Lonkiri "Kiri" Timung
- Location: India; Australia
- No. of episodes: 21

Release
- Original network: MTV India
- Original release: 29 November 2008 – 26 April 2009

Series chronology
- ← Previous; Season 5 Next → Season 7

Roadies - Hell Down Under is the fifth season MTV Roadies. It premiered on 29 November 2008 and concluded on 26 April 2009.

Roop Bhinder and Palak Johal returned as All-Stars in Roadies X: Battle for Glory.

Contestants	Audition City	Affiliation	Place	Notes
Nauman Sait	Bengaluru	Om Blues	Winner	Won total prize money of ₹3,62,000 and a Hero Honda Karizma Bike. Voted out in the 4th episode. Re-entered in the 7th episode after defeating Pradeep in the Zorb task. In the finale, defeated Longkiri to win the season.
Longkiri "Kiri" Timung	Kolkata	Om Blues	Runner-up	Won a Hero Honda Karizma Bike. Evicted in the 7th episode after losing the Ladder task against Sufi. Re-entered in the 13th episode through a vote-in by fellow contestants and defeated Sufi and Natasha in the Plank task. Lost to Nauman in finale.
Gurmeet "Palak" Kaur Johal	Bengaluru	Om Blues	3rd	Voted out in the 3rd episode. Re-entered in the 7th episode after defeating Bobby in the Mechanical Bull task. In semi-final, eliminated by Longkiri.
Natasha Sinha	Chandigarh	Brats	4th	Voted out in the 11th episode. Returned in the 13th episode and failed in the Plank task.
Puneet "Sufi" Malhotra	Mumbai	–	5th	Voted out in the 10th episode. Returned in the 13th episode and failed in the Plank task. Voted out in the 1st episode. Re-entered in the 7th episode after defeating Longkiri in the Ladder task.
Paulami De	Kolkata	Om Blues	6th	Voted out in the 12th episode.
Samrat Kaushal	Ahmedabad	Om Blues	7th	Won a Hero Honda Karizma Bike. Voted out in the 9th episode.
Tamanna "Tammy" Sharma	Chandigarh	Om Blues	8th	Voted out in the 8th episode.
Sandeep "Sandy" Singh	New Delhi	Brats	9th	Voted out in the 7th episode.
Bobby Chopra	New Delhi	Brats	10th	Eliminated in the 7th episode after losing the Mechanical Bull task against Palak.
Pradeep Singh	New Delhi	Brats	11th	Eliminated in the 7th episode after losing the Zorb task against Nauman.
Suzanna "Suzi" Mukherjee	Mumbai	Brats	12th	Voted out in the 6th episode.
Roop Bhinder	New Delhi	Brats	13th	Voted out in the 5th episode.
Devarshi "Dev" Patel	Ahmedabad	Om Blues	14th	Voluntarily eliminated himself in the 5th episode.
Varisha Hawelia	Kolkata	Om Blues	15th	Voted out in the 2nd episode.
Vicky Arora	Ahmedabad	None	16th	Eliminated in the 1st episode after losing the obstacle race challenge.
Sonia Chauhan	Chandigarh	None	17th	Eliminated in the 1st episode after losing the obstacle race challenge.
Neha Kapoor	New Delhi	None	18th	Eliminated in the 1st episode after losing the obstacle race challenge.
Bhanu Pratap Singh Rana	Ahmedabad	None	19th	Eliminated in the 1st episode after losing the obstacle race challenge.
Ankur Khanduja	Chandigarh	None	20th	Eliminated in the 1st episode after losing the obstacle race challenge.

== Season 7 ==
MTV Roadies
- Presented by: Rannvijay Singh; Bani J
- Judges: Nikhil Chinapa; Cyrus Sahukar
- No. of contestants: 15
- Winner: Anwar Syed
- Runner-up: Zaid Bin Nazir
- No. of episodes: 22

Release
- Original network: MTV India
- Original release: 8 November 2009 – 25 June 2010

MTV Roadies 7 (advertised as ROADIES) is the seventh season of MTV Roadies, a popular weekly reality television show on MTV India. The season first aired on 8 November 2009 and is airing its annual "auditions" portion in which the contestants of the show are selected. Part of the season took place in Africa

=== List of Roadies ===
1. Ameya R. Kadam: Ameya is 20-year-old student of Commercial Arts.
2. Amritpal Singh: Amritpal is a 24-year-old guy from Mumbai. He is the adventure loving Roadie in MTV Roadies 7.
3. Anwar Syed: The winner of Roadies 7, Anwar is a 24-year-old guy. He is the sports loving Roadie in Roadies 7.
4. Bharti Nagpal: Bharti Nagpal is a 23-year-old girl from Delhi. She is the travel loving Roadie in MTV Roadies 7.
5. Charlie Chauhan: Charlie is a 20-year-old female from Shimla. She is fun loving Roadies in Roadies 7.
6. Eric Roy: Eric is a 20-year-old guy from Kolkata. He is the smart Roadies in MTV Roadies 7.
7. Gaurav Gill: Gaurav is a 21-year-old guy from Mumbai. He is music loving Roadies in Roadies 7.
8. Mannat Mundi: Mannat is an 18-year-old girl from Chandigarh. She was challenging rider in MTV Roadies 7.
9. Meghna Mirgnani: Meghna is a 24-year-old girl from Mumbai. She is nature loving Roadies in Roadies 7.
10. Mohit Malik: Mohit is a 19-year-old intelligent guy. He is also a good Roadies in MTV Roadies 7.
11. Nisha Rana: Nisha Rana is a 25-year-old girl from Chandigarh. She is also challenging Roadies in Roadies 7.
12. Priyanka Roy: Priyanka is a 22-year-old female from Kolkata. She is painting loving Roadies in MTV Roadies 7.
13. Ravneet Kaur: Ravneet is an 18-year-old simple girl. She is basketball loving Roadies in Roadies 7.
14. Vikas Ambwani: Vikas is a 24-year-old guy from Kota. He is the hardworking Roadies in MTV Roadies 7.
15. Vikram Jeet Singh: Vikram is a 23-year-old guy from Delhi. He is fun loving rider in Roadies 7.
16. Yatin Madhok: Yatin is a 19-year-old guy from Delhi. He is friendly rider in MTV Roadies 7.
17. Zaid Bin Nazir: Zaid is a 24-year-old guy from Bangalore. He is also fun loving guy who is the Roadies in Roadies 7.
18. Priyanka Telang: Priyanka is a 24-year-old girl.
19. Rahul Suri: Rahul is a 25-year-old guy from Delhi.
20. Ranjna Rawat: Ranjna Rawat is a 21-year-old girl from Chandigarh.
21. Rishabh Gulati: Rishabh is a 20-year-old guy from Delhi.
22. Sahibjit Singh: Sahibjit is a 21-year-old guy from Delhi.
23. Shweta Bisen: Shweta is a 24-year-old girl from Nagpur.

== Season 8 ==
MTV Roadies
- Presented by: Rannvijay Singh
- Judges: Raghu Ram; Rajiv Laxman
- No. of contestants: 13
- Winner: Aanchal Khurana
- Runner-up: Mohit Saggar
- No. of episodes: 28

Release
- Original network: MTV India
- Original release: 19 January – 18 June 2011

MTV Roadies Shortcut To Hell is the eighth season of MTV Roadies, a reality television show aired on MTV India. The season 8 of roadies was also known as "Shortcut To Hell" as the second half of the season took place in Brazil. The audition episodes were aired from 22 January 2011 and the journey episodes began airing on 5 March 2011. Its auditions were held in various cities of India, like Ahmedabad, Kolkata, Bengaluru, Chandigarh, Delhi and Pune. The audition is done by Raghu Ram, Rajiv Laxman and Rannvijay Singh. The title was won by Aanchal Khurana from Delhi.

Avtar Nischal, Suchit Vikram Singh, and Mohit Saggar returned as All-Stars for Roadies X - Battle for Glory. Nischal withdrew in mid-season, Singh finished in 10th place and Saggar eventually placed as 2nd Runner-up.

=== Contestants ===
There were thirteen contestants overall.

Contestant	Finish	Total Votes
Aanchal Khurana; Delhi, Uttar Pradesh	~~4th Voted out~~ Winner	6
Mohit Saggar; Chandigarh, Punjab	11th Voted out Runner-up	9
Suchit Vikram Singh; Delhi, Uttar Pradesh	Eliminated in Finals	5
Pooja Banerjee; Hyderabad, Andhra Pradesh	10th Voted out	5
Anamika Datta; Chandigarh, Punjab	Eliminated in Quarterfinals	1
Rahul Sheoron; Chandigarh, Punjab	~~1st Voted out~~ 9th Voted out	11
Suraj Chinnadore; Delhi, Haryana	8th Voted out	9
Vibhor Sharma; Delhi, Uttar Pradesh	7th Voted out	8
Chandni; Ahmedabad, Gujarat	6th Voted out	8
Prachi Agarwal; Kolkata, West Bengal	5th Voted out	2
Renee Dhyani; Delhi, Uttar Pradesh	4th Voted out	4
Dev Singh; Chandigarh, Punjab	3rd Voted out	7
Avtar Nischal; Delhi, Uttar Pradesh	2nd Voted out	8

== Season 9 ==
MTV Roadies
- Presented by: Rannvijay Singh
- Judges: Raghu Ram; Rajiv Laxman
- No. of contestants: 13
- Winner: Vikas Khoker
- Runner-up: Himani Sharma
- No. of episodes: 27

Release
- Original network: MTV India
- Original release: 7 January – 30 June 2012

MTV Roadies 9 : Everything or Nothing is the ninth season of MTV Roadies, a reality television show aired on MTV India. The auditions started on 16 September from Pune following with Audition in Kolkata, Delhi, Chandhigarh and Hyderabad. Part of the season will take place in United States of America. The show started airing on MTV India from 7 January 2012 and every new episode aired on Saturdays at 7 p.m. IST.

The series was won by Vikas Khoker from Chandigarh. He won the title on 30 June 2012 and walked away with a total cash prize of ₹ 617,000.

Anirudh Sharma and Diyali Chauhan returned as All-Stars for Roadies X – Battle for Glory. Chauhan finished in 15th place and Sharma placed as 3rd Runner-up.

=== Contestants ===
There were thirteen contestants overall.

Contestant	Finish	Total Votes
Vikas Khoker; Chandigarh, Punjab	~~8th Voted out~~ Winner	5
Himani Sharma; Chandigarh, Punjab	Runner-up	1
Vinay Abhishek; Hyderabad, Andhra Pradesh	Eliminated in Finals	1
Kanak Raju; Delhi, Uttar Pradesh	~~2nd Voted out~~ Eliminated in Finals	9
Taranjeet Kaur; Hyderabad, Andhra Pradesh	~~5th Voted out~~ Eliminated in Finals	7
Arsh Shearif; Hyderabad, Andhra Pradesh	~~1st Voted out~~ 12th Voted out	14
Manali Banerjee; Kolkata, West Bengal	11th Voted out	9
Pratima Dagar; Delhi, Haryana	10th Voted out	9
Diyali Chauhan; Delhi, Uttar Pradesh	9th Voted out	8
Abhishek Shetty; Pune, Maharashtra	7th Voted out	16
Khushbu Patel; Hyderabad, Andhra Pradesh	6th Voted out	5
Dimpy Yadav; Chandigarh, Punjab	4th Voted out	8
Anirudh Sharma; Hyderabad, Andhra Pradesh	3rd Voted out	1

The Total Votes is the number of votes a roadie has received during Vote-outs where the roadie is eligible to be eliminated from the game.

== Season 10 ==
MTV Roadies
- Presented by: Bani J
- Judges: Raghu Ram; Rajiv Laxman; Rannvijay Singh
- No. of contestants: 16
- Winner: Palak Johal
- Runner-up: Ramandeep Kaur
- No. of episodes: 17

Release
- Original network: MTV India
- Original release: 19 January – 11 May 2013

MTV Roadies X : Battle for Glory is the tenth season of MTV Roadies, a reality television show aired on MTV India. The auditions started on 31 October 2012 and were held in Pune, Delhi, Chandigarh and Hyderabad. The show started airing on MTV India from 19 January 2013 with new episodes airing every Saturday at 7:00 pm IST.

The series was won by veteran roadie Palak Johal, originally from Season 6, of Team Raghu. She won the title on 11 May 2013. Her grand price included a total cash price of ₹ 450,000, a Hero Impulse bike and an HP laptop.

=== Contestants ===
There were sixteen contestants overall.

Contestant	Original Team	Switched Team	Finish	Total Votes
Palak Johal; Bangalore, Karnataka	Raghu	Raghu	Winner	1
Ramandeep Kaur Dhillon; New Delhi, Delhi	Rannvijay	Rannvijay	Runner-up	5
Mohit Saggar; Chandigarh, Punjab	Raghu	Raghu	Eliminated in Finale	7
Anirudh Sharma; Hyderabad, Andhra Pradesh	Raghu	Rannvijay	Eliminated in Finale	4
Gaurav Singh; Hyderabad, Andhra Pradesh	Rannvijay	Rannvijay	Eliminated in Semifinal	8
Sonal Sharma; New Delhi, Delhi	Rannvijay	Rannvijay	Eliminated in Semifinal	5
Harmeet Singh; New Delhi, Delhi	Rannvijay	Raghu	Eliminated in Episode 10	6
Swati Goswami; New Delhi, Delhi	Rannvijay	Raghu	Eliminated in Episode 9	7
Suchit Vikram Singh; New Delhi, Delhi	Raghu	Raghu	Eliminated in Episode 8	4
Roopali Anand; New Delhi, Delhi	Raghu	Rannvijay	Eliminated in Episode 8	4
Roop Bhinder; New Delhi, Delhi	Raghu		Eliminated in Episode 6	9
Geetika Budhiraja; Chandigarh, Punjab	Rannvijay		Eliminated in Episode 6	11
Avtar Nischal; New Delhi, Delhi	Raghu		Forfeited in Episode 5	6
Vikas Kumar; Delhi, Uttar Pradesh	Rannvijay		Eliminated in Episode 3	3
Diyali Chauhan; Delhi, Uttar Pradesh	Raghu		Eliminated in Episode 2	5
Jahid Kalim; Pune, Maharashtra	Rannvijay		Eliminated in Episode 2	7

The Total Votes is the number of votes a roadie has received during Vote-outs where the roadie is eligible to be eliminated from the game.

== Season 11 ==
MTV Roadies
- Presented by: Bani J
- Judges: Rannvijay Singh; Raghu Ram
- No. of contestants: 15
- Winner: Nikhil Sachdeva
- Runner-up: Utkarsh Khanna
- No. of episodes: 18

Release
- Original network: MTV India
- Original release: 25 January – 18 May 2014

MTV Roadies X1 : Ride for Respect is the eleventh season of Indian reality show MTV Roadies. The show was hosted by Rannvijay Singh, who was also one of the judges, along with Raghu Ram, during personal interview rounds. It started airing on MTV India from 25 January 2014.

The series was won by Nikhil Sachdeva (also popularly known as Nick). He won the title on 18 May 2014. His grand price included a Hero Impulse bike and a total cash price of ₹ 320,000.

=== Contestants ===
There are fourteen contestants selected from 4 cities.

Contestant	Finish
Nikhil Sachdeva; Delhi	Winner
Utkarsh Khanna; Chandigarh, Punjab	Runner-up
Meher Gill; Chandigarh, Punjab	~~Eliminated in Episode 4~~; Eliminated in Finale
Garima Bhateja; Delhi	Eliminated in Finale
Ajay Sehrawat; Delhi	Eliminated in Episode 10
Taru PK; Delhi	Eliminated in Episode 10
Montek Verma; Delhi	Eliminate in Episode 10
Rashika Singh; Delhi	Eliminate in Episode 10
Charu Bakshi; Delhi	Eliminated in Episode 8
Siddharth Krishna; Mumbai, Maharashtra	~~Eliminated in Episode 6~~ Eliminated in Episode 8
Pallavi Sharma; Mumbai, Maharashtra	Eliminated in Episode 6
Rajkumar Singh; Pune, Maharashtra	Eliminated in Episode 4
Nikhat Khan; Mumbai, Maharashtra	Eliminated in Episode 2
Rishie; Mumbai, Maharashtra	Eliminated in Episode 2
Anjali Rangi; Chandigarh, Punjab	Eliminated in Episode 2

== Season 12 ==
MTV Roadies
- Presented by: Gurbani Judge
- Judges: Rannvijay Singh; Esha Deol; Karan Kundrra; Vijender Singh
- No. of contestants: 22
- Winner: Prince Narula(Gang Rannvijay)
- Runner-up: Gurmeet Rehal (Gang Vijender)
- No. of episodes: 22

Release
- Original network: MTV India
- Original release: 26 January – 27 June 2015

Series chronology
- Next → Season 14

MTV Roadies X2 is the 12th season of Indian reality show MTV Roadies.

=== Contestants ===
There are twenty two contestants selected from 4 cities.

Contestant	Finish
1st Prince Narula; Pune	Winner
2nd Gurmeet Rehal; Delhi	Runner-up
3rd Rizwan; Pune	Eliminated in Episode 21
4th Rajatdeep; Delhi	Eliminated in Episode 21
Amneet; Delhi	Eliminated in Episode 21
Kajal; Chandigarh	Eliminated in Episode 21
Varun Sood; Delhi	Eliminated in Episode 20
Martina; Pune	Eliminated in Episode 20
Archis; Pune	Eliminated in Episode 19
Ishpi; Delhi	Eliminated in Episode 18
Nitu; Kolkata	Eliminated in Episode 17
Ajay hooda Chandigarh	Eliminated in Episode 16
Monica; Chandigarh	Eliminated in Episode 16
Hussain; Delhi	Eliminated in Episode 15
Aviral; Delhi	Eliminated in Episode 14
Ishita; Chandigarh	Eliminated in Episode 13
Jay; Pune	Eliminated in Episode 12
Madhuri; Delhi	Eliminated in Episode 11
Mamta; Delhi	Eliminated in Episode 11
Bhuvan; Chandigarh	Eliminated in Episode 11
Nabila; Kolkata	Eliminated in Episode 9
Shruti; Delhi	Eliminated in Episode 8

== Season 13 ==
MTV Roadies
- Season 13
- Presented by: Gaelyn Mendonca
- Judges: Rannvijay Singha; Karan Kundrra; Neha Dhupia; Sushil Kumar; Prince Narula (replacing Sushil Kumar on journey)
- No. of contestants: 22
- Winner: Balraj Singh Khehra (Gang Karan)
- Runner-up: Navdeesh Arora (Gang Prince)
- No. of episodes: 24

Release
- Original network: MTV India
- Original release: 20 February – 19 June 2016

Series chronology
- ← Previous; Season 12

MTV Roadies X4: Your Gang, Your Glory is the thirteenth season of Indian reality show MTV Roadies. The show is hosted by Gaelyn Mendonca. It started airing on MTV India from 20 February 2016. The audition episodes were aired from 20 February 2016 and the journey episodes began airing on 6 April 2016. Its auditions were held in various cities of India, like Chandigarh, Delhi, Pune and Lucknow. The auditions were taken by the four aspiring gang leaders – Rannvijay Singha, Karan Kundrra, Neha Dhupia and Sushil Kumar. After a prestigious finale, Balraj was crowned as the winner.

=== Contestants ===
There were originally 20 contestants at the beginning of the journey. Battleground winner contestant Benafsha Soonawalla entered in episode 6, and Shivangi Walia replaced Kavya Khurana in episode 9, bringing the total contestant number to 22.

Contestant	Gang	Finish	Total votes
Anamika Barman	Prince	Eliminated in semi-finals	0
Anseela	Neha		4
Benafsha Soonawalla	Karan		0
Divya Verma	Neha	Eliminated in semi-finals	5
Gaurav Alugh	Karan	Eliminated in the Grand Finale	10
Hifsa Sharma	Rannvijay		9
Satish Kumar	Neha	Eliminated in the Semi-Finale	0
Navdeesh Arora	Prince	Eliminated in Grand Finale	0
Rubal Dhankar	Rannvijay		0
Saad Choudhary	Karan		4
Tej Singh Gill	Rannvijay		0
Shivangi Walia	Karan		3
Yogesh Jadhav	Prince	Voted-out in 6th vote-out	10
Tarasha Diva	Rannvijay	Voted-out in 5th vote-out(wild card entry;replacing Hifsa;voted out)	6
Ocean Singh	Neha	Voted-out in 5th vote-out	22
Kavya Khurana	Karan	Forfeited due to ligament injury	4
Sunny Valia	Prince	Voted-out in 4th vote-out	8
Karishma Arora	Rannvijay	Voted-out in 3rd vote-out	7
Balraj Singh Khehra	Karan	Won	8
Bharti Bhati	Prince	Voted-out in 2nd vote-out	9
Mahamedhaa Nagar	Karan	Eliminated	0
Rohan Pillai	Neha	Voted-out in 1st vote-out	8

== Season 14 ==
MTV Roadies
- Season 14
- Presented by: Gaelyn Mendonca
- Judges: Rannvijay Singha; Karan Kundrra; Neha Dhupia; Prince Narula; Harbhajan Singh; Nikhil Chinapa (replacing Karan Kundrra on the journey)
- No. of contestants: 22
- Winner: Shweta Mehta (Gang Neha)
- Runner-up: Baseer Ali (Gang Prince)
- No. of episodes: 26

Release
- Original network: MTV India
- Original release: 25 February – 22 July 2017

MTV Roadies Rising is the fourteenth season of Indian reality show MTV Roadies. The show is hosted by Gaelyn Mendonca. It started airing on MTV India from 25 February 2017. The auditions were taken by the four aspiring gang leaders - Rannvijay Singha, Karan Kundrra, Neha Dhupia and Prince Narula. Cricketer Harbhajan Singh is to play a crucial part. Later Nikhil Chinapa replaced Karan Kundrra as gang leader on the journey. Journey started on 8 April 2017 and Roadies Battleground was on 7 April 2017.

Vote-out order	Gang	Roadie
Winner	Neha	Shweta Mehta
Runner-up	Prince	Baseer Ali
3	Prince	Meenal Shah; Semi-finalist
4	Nikhil	Priyank Sharma; Semi-finalist
5	Neha	Mandeep Gujjar; Semi-finalist
6	Rannvijay	Shiv Thakare; Semi-finalist
7	Rannvijay	Samar Sarkar
8	Rannvijay	Samyuktha Hegde
9	Neha	Shane Luke
10	Rannvijay	Veerpal Dhaliwal
11	Nikhil	Khushnuma Pathan
12	Nikhil	Rahul Gautam
13	Rannvijay	Aggy Carvalho
14	Prince	Varun Verma
15	Neha	Rakhi Lohchab (Walked)
16	Prince	Jagriti Jha
17	Neha and Ranvijay	Mandeep and Veerpal
18	Prince	Jibran Dar (Ejected)
19	Nikhil	Prabhjot Kaur
20	Prince	Divya Oswal
21	Prince	Milan Verma
22	Neha	Gurpreet Kaur

== Season 15 ==
MTV Roadies
- Season 15
- Presented by: Rannvijay Singha
- Judges: Prince Narula; Neha Dhupia; Nikhil Chinapa; Raftaar
- No. of contestants: 24
- Winner: Kashish Thakur(Gang Neha)
- Runner-up: Preeti Kuntal (Gang Prince)
- No. of episodes: 28

Release
- Original network: MTV India
- Original release: 18 February – 4 August 2018

MTV Roadies Xtreme is the fifteenth season of Indian reality show MTV Roadies. The show is hosted by Rannvijay Singha. It started airing on MTV India from 18 February 2018. The auditions were taken by Rannvijay Singha and the four aspiring gang leaders - Raftaar, Nikhil Chinapa, Neha Dhupia and Prince Narula and from this season, Rannvijay serves as a mentor and host.

Order	Gang	Roadie	Total votes
Winner	Neha	Kashish	Winner
1st Runner up	Prince	Preeti	Finalists
2nd Runner up	Prince	Nishkarsh	Finalists
13	Neha	Surbhi	Semi Finalist
13	Prince	Sharan	Semi Finalist
13	Raftaar	Abhishek	Semi Finalist
12	Nikhil	Shruti	Semi Finalist
12	Raftaar	Sonu	Semi Finalist
11	Nikhil	Rohan	4
11	Raftaar	Shubhada	3
10	Neha	Nikav	6
10	Raftaar	Geetika	6
9	Nikhil	Mahekdeep	9
8	Neha	Kriti	4
8	Nikhil	Iram	6
7	Prince	Minni	8
6	Neha	Sandy	3
6	Raftaar	Pavneet	2
6	Prince	Khursheed	3
5	Raftaar	Farah	9
4	No Gang	Priya	11
3	No Gang	Samiksha	7
2	No Gang	Bibek	Quit
1	No Gang	Vidit	11

== Season 16 ==
MTV Roadies
- Season 16
- Presented by: Rannvijay Singha
- Judges: Neha Dhupia; Prince Narula; Nikhil Chinapa; Raftaar; Sandeep Singh
- No. of contestants: 27
- Winner: Arun Sharma (Gang Raftaar)
- Runner-up: Ankita Pathak (Gang Prince)
- No. of episodes: 28

Release
- Original network: MTV India
- Original release: 10 February – 18 August 2019

MTV Roadies: Real Heroes was the sixteenth season of the Indian reality show MTV Roadies, which premiered on MTV India from 10 February 2019. The audition were taken by Rannvijay Singha & the four returning gang leaders - Prince Narula, Nikhil Chinapa, Neha Dhupia and Raftaar along with new gang leader Sandeep Singh. Rannvijay continued to serve as a mentor and host, while Divya Agarwal and Varun Sood played the role of Roadies Insiders. Baseer Ali hosted the Voot segments with Shruti Sinha.

Roadie	Status	Total Votes
Arun Sharma		Winner
Ankita Pathak		1st Runner-up
Bidhan Shrestha		2nd Runner-up
Lakshya		Semi finalist
Bhargsethu		Semi finalist
Tara Prasad		Semi finalist
Yukti Arora		Semi finalist
Gaurav		Released
Ashish Bhatia		Eliminated
Milind Chandwani		Knocked out^{3}
Sohil Singh		Knocked out^{3}
Sahiba Kaur		6
Simran Kaur Purewal		2
Aarushi Dutta		3
Rachal Gupta		4
Rashmeet Kaur Sethi		~~10~~ 1^{1}
Aadil		7
Nikita		2
Priya		2
Chetna		3
Tarun		4
Pooja		9
Xerxes		11
Krishna Kaul		10
Preeti		15
Niharika		7
Rupesh		6

Notes

- ^1 - The total votes were countered which resulted in a tie(1–1–1), but due to Rashmeet having received 10 votes as the majority, she was voted out.
- ^2 - Both Aarushi and Rachel were voted out in the fight to vote task with only the Roadie who escaped the cage would vote.
- ^3 - Gang Neha was Knocked out by gang Sandeep.
- ^4 - Gaurav was released as heinjured his arm in a challenge prior.

indicates battleground entry.
indicates roadie re-entered as wildcard. Color Keys

Gang Sandeep
Gang Neha
Gang Prince
Gang Raftaar
Gang Nikhil

== Season 17 ==
MTV Roadies
- Season 17
- Presented by: Rannvijay Singha
- Judges: Prince Narula; Neha Dhupia; Nikhil Chinapa; Raftaar; Varun Sood (Replacing Raftaar)
- No. of contestants: 23
- Winner: Hamid Barkzi
- Runner-up: Michael Ajay
- No. of episodes: 36

Release
- Original network: MTV India
- Original release: 15 February 2020 – 16 January 2021

MTV Roadies: Revolution is the seventeenth season of MTV Roadies, which premiered on MTV India from 15 February 2020. Prince Narula, Nikhil Chinapa, Neha Dhupia and Raftaar (Varun Sood replaced him mid season) returned as Leaders while Rannvijay Singh continues as the host.

In this season, there is no gang leader nor any gang. The contestants are going to fight solo during their journey right from the beginning. In the previous seasons from Roadies X2 contestants are grouped into gangs under a gang leader to perform their tasks and they fight solo towards the end of the show.

For the very first time, the show is being streamed on Voot 24hr before TV steaming platform a day before the TV which is made exclusively available only to Voot Select subscribers.

== Season 18 ==
MTV Roadies
- Season 18
- Presented by: Sonu Sood (Host); Abhimanyu Raghav; Vishakha Fulsugne (Roadies Insiders)
- No. of contestants: 20
- Winners: Ashish Bhatia; Nandini G
- Runners-up: Yukti Arora; Jashwanth Bopanna
- No. of episodes: 34

Release
- Original network: MTV India
- Original release: 8 April – 10 July 2022

MTV Roadies: Journey in South Africa is the eighteenth season of India MTV Roadies produced by Pippip Media Private Limited. It premiered on MTV on 8 April 2022.

A spin-off series, Roadies - All Access Star hosted by Gaelyn Mendonca and judged by Arjun Kanungo streamed exclusively on Voot.

On 10 July 2022, Ashish Bhatia and Nandini G emerged as winners of the season, and for first time there were two winners. Jashwanth Bopanna and Yukti Arora were the first runners-up and Kevin Almasifar and Moose Jattana were 2nd runners-up.

Roadie	Roadies History			Roadies: Journey In South Africa
Roadie	Season	Gang	Result	Roadies: Journey In South Africa
Ashish Bhatia	Roadies: Real Heroes	Sandeep Singh	9th Place (Lost; Eliminated)	Winner
Nandini G				Winner
Yukti Arora	Roadies: Real Heroes	Prince Narula	Semi-Finalist	1st Runner Up
Jashwanth Bopanna				1st Runner Up
Kevin Almasifar	Roadies: Revolution	None	Eliminated	2nd Runner-Up
Moose Jattana				~~8th Place(Voted out)~~ Re-entered; 2nd Runner-Up
Gaurav Alugh	Roadies X4	Karan Kundrra	Finalist	~~8th Place~~; ~~(Voted out)~~ Re-entered; Semi-Finalist
Simi Talsania				Semi-Finalist
Sohil Singh Jhuti	Roadies: Real Heroes	Neha Dhupia	10th Place (Lost; Knocked out)	5th place (Eliminated)
Sidharth Manoj				5th place (Eliminated)
Aarushi Dutta	Roadies: Real Heroes	Raftaar	14th Place (Lost; Voted out)	~~9th Place~~; ~~(Voted out)~~ Re-entered; 6th place (Voted out)
Arshvir Singh Wahi				~~7th Place~~; ~~(Voted out)~~ Re-entered;6th place (Voted out)
Baseer Ali	Roadies: Rising	Prince Narula	Runner-Up	7th place (Voted Out)
Soundous Moufakir				7th place (Voted Out)
Arushi Chawla	Roadies: Revolution	Nikhil Chinapa	14th Place (Voted out; Eliminated)	~~7th Place~~; ~~(Voted out)~~ Re-entered; 8th place (Voted out)
Sakshi Sharma				8th place (Voted out)
Kavya Khurana	Roadies X4	Karan Kundrra	17th Place (Quit; Health Issues)	9th Place (Voted out)
Tanish Ghorpade				~~9th Place~~; ~~(Voted out)~~ Re-entered; 9th Place (Voted out)
Sapna Malik	Roadies: Revolution	None	21st Place (Voted out)	~~10th Place~~; ~~(Voted out; Eliminated)~~ Re-entered; 10th Place (Voted out; Eliminated)
Angad Bawa				~~10th Place~~; ~~(Voted out; Eliminated)~~ Re-entered; 10th Place (Voted out; Eliminated)

== Season 19 ==
Roadies Karm Ya Kaand
- Season 19
- Presented by: Sonu Sood
- Judges: Gautam Gulati; Prince Narula; Rhea Chakraborty
- No. of contestants: 33
- Winners: Vashu Jain (Gang Rhea)
- Runners-up: Siwet Tomar (Gang Prince)
- No. of episodes: 40

Release
- Original network: MTV India
- Original release: 3 June – 15 October 2023

Series chronology
- ← Previous; Season 18 Next → Season 20

MTV Roadies: Karm Ya Kaand (transl. Roadies: Fate Or Scandal) is the nineteenth season of the Indian reality show MTV Roadies produced by Banijay Asia. Hosted by Sonu Sood for the second time, the season premiered on MTV India on 3 June 2023 and digitally streams on JioCinema. It also marks the return of gang leader Prince Narula along with new gang leaders Rhea Chakraborty and Gautam Gulati. The auditions were taken by Sonu Sood, Prince Narula, Rhea Chakraborty and Gautam Gulati.

== Season 20 ==
Roadies Double Cross
- Season 20
- Presented by: Rannvijay Singha
- Judges: Prince Narula; Neha Dhupia; Rhea Chakraborty; Elvish Yadav; Gautam Gulati
- No. of contestants: 37
- Winners: Kushal Tanwar (Gullu) (Gang Elvish)
- Runners-up: Hartaaj Singh Gill (Gang Prince)
- No. of episodes: 42

Release
- Original network: MTV India
- Original release: 11 January – 1 June 2025

Series chronology
- ← Previous; Season 19

MTV Roadies: Double Cross is the twentieth season of MTV Roadies. It premiered on MTV India on 11 January 2025 and is digitally available on JioHotstar.

The season was won by Kushal Tanwar (Gullu) from Gang Elvish, with Hartaaj Singh Gill from Gang Prince finishing second.

Roadies	Status
Kushal Tanwar (Gullu)	Eliminated; Episode 26
Kushal Tanwar (Gullu)	(Note: Kushal double-crossed his gang leader, Gautam, and joined Elvish’s gang to gain an advantage in the finale after winning a ticket to finale task.); Episode 40
Kushal Tanwar (Gullu)	Winner; Episode 42
Hartaaj Singh Gill	Released; Episode 34
Hartaaj Singh Gill	Runner-Up; Episode 42
Priya Judoka	Eliminated; Episode 32
Priya Judoka	Eliminated; Episode 41
Priya Judoka	Finalist; Episode 42
Rishabh Sachdev	Eliminated; Episode 21
Rishabh Sachdev	Finalist; Episode 42
RD Dedha	Finalist; Episode 42
Rohit Singh	Finalist; Episode 42
Manmeet Singh	Eliminated; Episode 41
Mannu Chaudhary	Eliminated; Episode 41
Gunjan Sharma	Eliminated; Episode 41
Rengsajir T. Kilingpi	~~Eliminated~~; ~~Episode 29~~
Rengsajir T. Kilingpi	Eliminated; Episode 41
Yogesh Rawat	Eliminated; Episode 41
Jeanbi "Jimy" Gangmei	Eliminated; Episode 32
Jeanbi "Jimy" Gangmei	Eliminated; Episode 40
Yogesh Sharma	Eliminated; Episode 40
Harsh Arora	Eliminated; Episode 32
Harsh Arora	Eliminated; Episode 38
Nishi Tanwar	Eliminated; Episode 29
Nishi Tanwar	Eliminated; Episode 35
Alifia Zojwala	Eliminated; Episode 34
Devanshi Sharma	Eliminated; Episode 14
Devanshi Sharma	Eliminated; Episode 34
Farhaan Khan	Eliminated; Episode 34
Kajal Jangra	Eliminated; Episode 34
Rashmitha Shetty	Eliminated; Episode 34
Sarruchi Mittal	Eliminated; Episode 34
Simran Behl	Eliminated; Episode 34
Valence Kundra	Eliminated; Episode 34
Zorawar Singh	Eliminated; Episode 32
Ruchita Jamdar	Eliminated; Episode 15
Ruchita Jamdar	Eliminated; Episode 32
Shubhangi Jaiswal	Eliminated; Episode 32
Yaashvi Shah	Eliminated; Episode 32
Nisha Mishra	Eliminated; Episode 32
Bishal "Charlie" Paul	Eliminated; Episode 29
Anirudh Sharma	Eliminated; Episode 26
Akash Thapa	Eliminated; Episode 23
Ashu Jain	Eliminated; Episode 23
Syed Azhar Hassan	Eliminated; Episode 23
Heena Jain	Eliminated; Episode 18
Anoushka Chauhan	Eliminated; Episode 18
Vinod Bhatt	Eliminated; Episode 15
Joel Mathew	Eliminated; Episode 14

indicates battleground entry.
indicates roadie re-entered as wildcard.
indicates roadie re-entered via auction.

Color Keys

Gang Elvish
Gang Neha
Gang Prince
Gang Rhea
Gang Gautam

== Season 21 ==
Roadies - Rebirth
- Season 21
- Presented by: Rannvijay Singha
- Judges: Prince Narula; Neha Dhupia; Nikhil Chinapa; Abhishek Malhan; Baseer Ali; Bani J Raghu Ram (OG Judge)

Release
- Original network: MTV India; Netflix India

Series chronology
- ← Previous; Season 20

MTV Roadies: Rebirth is the twenty-first season of MTV Roadies. It premiered on MTV India from 16 October 2026 and is digitally available on JioHotstar and Netflix.

This season total 32 roadies are selected, 16 for OG's and 16 for NewG's, among them 8 boys and 8 girls for each team.

Roadies		Status
G A N G O G'; S	Manya	
G A N G O G'; S	Britney R Ranglong	
G A N G O G'; S	Gurjant Singh	
G A N G O G'; S	Vishu Bajaj	
G A N G O G'; S	Kunal Lohni	
G A N G O G'; S	Karishma Talwar	
G A N G O G'; S	Shravani Sarjerao	
G A N G O G'; S	Ridhima Singh	
G A N G O G'; S	Jayshree Goswami	
G A N G O G'; S	Ganesh Chand Thakuri	
G A N G O G'; S	Justin D'Cruz	
G A N G O G'; S	Sanya Chaudhary	
G A N G O G'; S	Kritika Grover	
G A N G O G'; S	Preet Tanwar	
G A N G O G'; S	Xerxes Irani	
G A N G O G'; S	Dhanush Rajan	
G A N G N E W G'; S	Kajal Singh Rajput	
G A N G N E W G'; S	Eksha Hangma Subba	
G A N G N E W G'; S	Tushar Malik	
G A N G N E W G'; S	Vyomesh Koul	
G A N G N E W G'; S	Jacob Khaduju	
G A N G N E W G'; S	Arti Chaudhary	
G A N G N E W G'; S	Salbani Sangma	
G A N G N E W G'; S	Harmilan Kaur Bains	
G A N G N E W G'; S	Dolozing Pertin	
G A N G N E W G'; S	Sidharth	
G A N G N E W G'; S	Chitrankshi Giri	
G A N G N E W G'; S	Shubhi Joshi	
G A N G N E W G'; S	Sneha Tomar	
G A N G N E W G'; S	Lokesh Sharma	
G A N G N E W G'; S	Prithvir Singh	
G A N G N E W G'; S	Akom Kuken Ligu	

Color Keys

Gang Nikhil
Gang Neha
Gang Prince
Gang Abhishek
Gang Bani
Gang Baseer
