= Bigg Boss (Hindi TV series) season 10 =

Season of television series (2016)

Bigg Boss
- Season 10
- Presented by: Salman Khan
- No. of days: 105
- No. of housemates: 18
- Winner: Manveer Gurjar
- Runner-up: Bani Judge
- No. of episodes: 106

Release
- Original network: Colors TV
- Original release: 16 October 2016 – 29 January 2017

Season chronology
- ← Previous; Season 9 Next → Season 11

Bigg Boss 10, also known as Bigg Boss: India Isse Apna Hi Ghar Samjho, is the tenth season of the Indian reality TV series Bigg Boss. It began airing on 16 October 2016 on Colors TV. It was the first time when the doors of house were opened for commoners called Indiawale. This season ended on 29 January 2017 with Manveer Gurjar as the winner. Bani Judge became the first runner up.

This was the first season of Bigg Boss to be aired on an OTT platform - Voot. New element called ‘Unseen-Undekha’ was introduced by way of unseen footage uploaded on Voot.

== Housemates status ==
Sr	Housemate	Day entered	Day exited	Status
1	Manveer	Day 1	Day 105	Winner
2	Bani	Day 1	Day 105	1st runner-up
3	Lopamudra	Day 1	Day 105	2nd runner-up
4	Manu	Day 1	Day 44	Walked
4	Manu	Day 57	Day 105	3rd runner-up
5	Rohan	Day 1	Day 102	Evicted
6	Antara	Day 1	Day 98	Evicted
7	Nitibha	Day 1	Day 91	Evicted
8	Swami Om	Day 1	Day 48	Walked
8	Swami Om	Day 50	Day 81	Ejected
9	Gaurav	Day 1	Day 77	Evicted
10	Priyanka	Day 1	Day 7	Evicted
10	Priyanka	Day 36	Day 56	Evicted
10	Priyanka	Day 58	Day 69	Ejected
11	Rahul	Day 1	Day 63	Evicted
12	Sahil	Day 42	Day 56	Evicted
13	Jason	Day 42	Day 56	Walked
14	Elena	Day 42	Day 48	Evicted
15	Lokesh	Day 1	Day 35	Evicted
16	Karan	Day 1	Day 34	Evicted
17	Navin	Day 1	Day 21	Evicted
18	Akanksha	Day 1	Day 14	Evicted

== Housemates ==
The participants in the order of appearance and entered in house are:

=== Original entrants ===
- Swami Om – Social, religious and political leader.
- Lopamudra Raut – Model and beauty queen. She is an engineer by profession. She represented India at Miss United Continents 2016 pageant and was crowned 2nd runner up. She also won the "Best National Costume" award for India three years in a row.
- Manveer Gurjar – Farmer.
- Nitibha Kaul – Google marketing worker.
- Lokesh Sharma – Student.
- Akanksha Sharma – She is a Haryanvi writer and stage actress. She is the ex-wife of Yuvraj Singh's brother, Zorawar Singh.
- Rohan Mehra – Television actor and model. He is known for acting in Bade Achhe Lagte Hain as Varun and Yeh Rishta Kya Kehlata Hai as Naksh.
- Bani Judge – Reality TV star, actress, model and VJ. She participated in the reality show MTV Roadies in 2006. She later acted in films Aap Kaa Surroor and Zorawar.
- Karan Mehra – Television actor. He is known for his role of Naitik in the popular show Yeh Rishta Kya Kehlata Hai which aired on Star Plus. He participated in the dance reality show Nach Baliye in 2012.
- Manu Punjabi – Reality TV actor. He participated in Life OK's The Bachelorette India: Mere Khayaalon Ki Mallika in 2013.
- Gaurav Chopra – Actor. He is known for his roles in television shows like Uttaran and Doli Armaano Ki. He participated in Nach Baliye and Pati Patni Aur Woh.
- Priyanka Jagga – Marketing recruiter.
- Rahul Dev – Film actor. He is known for his roles in Bollywood. He has acted in many films like Kyon Ki, Ek Paheli Leela and Dishoom. He participated reality shows Power Couple and Fear Factor: Khatron Ke Khiladi.
- Navin Prakash – Teacher.
- Antara Biswas (also known as Monalisa) – Bhojpuri actress. She is a Bengali actress who has acted in more than 100 Bhojpuri films. She has appeared in films like Blackmail and Bunty Aur Babli.

=== Wild card entrants ===
- Jason Shah – Fitness model. He is known for participating in MTV Crunch. He also has acted in the films Partner and Fitoor.
- Elena Kazan – German-Russian film actress. She had acted in films such as Agent Vinod, John Day and Prague.
- Sahil Anand – Actor. He is known for participating in MTV Roadies in 2006. He later acted in the films Student of the Year and Love Day - Pyaar Ka Din. He also acted in television shows like Mera Naam Karegi Roshan and Rang Badalti Odhani.

=== Guest entrants ===
- Vikrant Singh Rajput – Film actor & model.

== Guests appearances ==
Week(s)	Guest(s)	Notes
Premiere	Deepika Padukone	To promote her film XXX: Return of Xander Cage.
1	Kamya Punjabi	To appreciate and motivate the contestants as an ex-contestant of Bigg Boss 7.
2	Karan Wahi and Bharti Singh	To promote their show Comedy Nights Bachao Taaza.
3	Farhan Akhtar and Shraddha Kapoor	To promote their film Rock On 2.
4	Ankit Tiwari, Neha Sharma, Aditya Seal and Aashim Gulati.	To promote their film Tum Bin 2.
4	Himesh Reshammiya	To promote his album Aap Se Mausiiquii.
4	Tanishaa Mukerji and VJ Andy	To appreciate and motivate the contestants as ex-contestants of Bigg Boss 7.
5	Mouni Roy and Anubhav Sinha	To promote their film Tum Bin 2
5	Alia Bhatt	To promote her film Dear Zindagi.
6	Sunny Leone	To do a special nomination task and celebrate her 5 years of Bigg Boss.
6	Gautam Gulati and Mandana Karimi	To appreciate and motivate the contestants as ex-contestants of Bigg Boss 8 and Bigg Boss 9 respectively.
6	Vidya Balan	To Promote her film Kahaani 2
7	Ranveer Singh and Vaani Kapoor	To Promote their film Befikre
8	Karishma Tanna and Dibang	To discuss their point of views on the game
8	Hina Khan	To support Rohan Mehra
9	Rubina Dilaik (Soumya), Mouni Roy (Shivanya/Shivangi), Adaa Khan (Shesha), Karanvir Bohra (Rocky), Vijayendra Kumeria (Suraj) and Meera Deosthale (Chakor)	Came as guest from Colors family from shows Naagin, Shakti - Astitva Ke Ehsaas Ki, Udaan.
9	Prachi Shah (Sharada), Ankitta Sharma (Naina) & Sangeita Chauhan (Meghna)	To promote their new show Ek Shringaar-Swabhiman
10	Alexander Meuis and Jermaine Meuis	To meet their mother Priyanka in the Family App Task.
10	Raghav Chopra	To meet his brother Gaurav in the Family App Task.
10	Vikrant Singh Rajpoot	To meet his girlfriend Mona in The Family App Task.
10	Siddharth Mehra	To meet his brother Rohan in the Family App Task.
10	Kumar Baisoya	To meet his son Manveer in the Family App Task.
10	Mrs.Kaul	To meet her daughter Nitibha in the Family App Task.
10	Gauhar Khan	To meet her best friend Bani in The Family App Task.
10	Bhagyashree Raut	To meet her sister Lopamudra in The Family App Task.
11	Diandra Soares and Aamir Ali	To discuss their point of views on the game
11	Salman Yusuff Khan, Shantanu Maheshwari, Karishma Tanna, Teriya Magar and Preetjot Singh	To celebrate New Year as the contestants from Jhalak Dikhhla Jaa 9
11	Ravi Kishan, Vindu Dara Singh and Lokesh Kumari Sharma	To celebrate New Year, appreciate and motivate the contestants as ex-contestants of Bigg Boss 1, Bigg Boss 2 and Bigg Boss 10 respectively
11	Bharti Singh, Krushna Abhishek, Sudesh Lehri, Anita Hassanandani, Mubeen Saudagar and Balraj Sayal	To celebrate New Year as the comedians from Comedy Nights Bachao Taaza
12	Aditya Roy Kapur and Shraddha Kapoor	To promote their film Ok Jaanu
13	Govinda	To promote his film Aa Gaya Hero
14	Sharman Joshi, Sana Khan and Gurmeet Choudhary	To promote film Wajah Tum Ho.
14	Vikrant Singh Rajpoot	To marry Monalisa.
14	Dinesh Lal Yadav, Ravi Kishan, Amrapali, Vikrant's sister and Monalisa's mother	Guests in Monalisa and Vikrant's Wedding
14	Jacqueline Fernandez, Ganesh Hegde, Karan Johar, Farah Khan and Maniesh Paul	As the judges and host and to declare the winner of the Jhalak Dikhhla Jaa 9
14	Salman Yusuff Khan, Shantanu Maheshwari and Teriya Magar with their respective choreo partner	As the Finalist of Jhalak Dikhhla Jaa 9
14	Shah Rukh Khan and Sunny Leone	To promote their Film Raees
15	Mandana Karimi, Nitibha Kaul, Navin Prakash, Rishabh Sinha and Lokesh Kumari	As guest in task BB Mela.
15	Farah Khan	Handler of the task Celebrities vs Indiawale.
15	Puneet Issar and Malishka Mendonsa	As the panelists and supporters of Celebrities Bani and Lopamudra in task Celebrities vs Indiawale.
15	Ravi Dubey and Shweta Singh	As the panelists and supporters of Indiawale Manveer and Manu in task Celebrities vs Indiawale.
Finale	Yami Gautam and Hrithik Roshan	To promote their Film Kaabil

== Weekly summary ==
The main events in the house are summarised in the table below. A typical week begins with nominations, followed by the luxury budget task, punishment than a task for immunity or anything else and then the eviction of a housemate during the Sunday or Saturday episode called as "Weekend Ka Vaar". Evictions, tasks, and other notable events for a particular week are noted in order of sequence.

Week 1	Entrances and Nominations	On Day 1, Swami Om, Lopamudra, Manveer, Nitibha, Rohan, Bani, Lokesh, Karan, Akanksha, Manu, Gaurav, Priyanka, Rahul, Navin and Antara entered the house. Indiawale were made Maliks (owners) and Celebrities were their Sevaks (servants). Bigg Boss announced the rules and each housemate were called in the confession room for nomination. Indiawale had to nominate 2 Celebrities and the Celebrities were asked to nominate 2 Indiawale. Gaurav and Monalisa from the Celebrities and Priyanka and Manu from Indiawale were nominated for the elimination.
Week 1	Tasks	Raaz: On Day 2, Bigg Boss gave Celebrities a task to become the Malik of the house. They had to guess maximum secret out of 8 to become Malik. On Day 2, Celebrities guessed only Akanksha's secret.; On Day 3, Celebrities guessed only Swami Om's secret out of 4 guesses.; On Day 4, Bigg Boss gave Celebrities last 4 riddles to solve the secrets. But Celebrities couldn't guess any of these secrets and remained Indiawale's sevak.
Week 1	Result	Won – Indiawale
Week 1	Reward	Common people remained owner of the house and Celebrities remained the same.
Week 1	Punishments	On Day 4, Bigg Boss asked the Housemates to choose worst performer from each team. Celebrities chose Antara and Indiawale chose Swami Om.
Week 1	Other Tasks	The Riding Horse: On Day 5, Indiawale broke the rule by cooking. For breaking the rule, Bigg Boss gave another chance to Celebrities to rule the house. They had to choose two housemates to ride the horse for whole day and the chosen housemate have to drink a jug of water when the toy horse neigh.; Celebrities: Bani and Gaurav Indiawale: Priyanka and Navin
Week 1	Result	Won – Indiawale
Week 1	Exit	On Day 7, Priyanka Jagga became the first housemate to evict from the house after facing the public vote.
Week 2
Week 2	Nominations	On Day 8, The housemates were sitting in the Garden Area and Bigg Boss announced that the contestants have to splash a plate of foam on the faces of the ones who they want to nominate for eliminations. At the end Monalisa, Gaurav and Rohan from Celebrities and Akanksha, Nitibha, Manoj and Manveer from Indiawale were nominated for the evictions.
Week 2	Tasks	Bigg Boss Laundry: Day 9 was the first day of this task. Indiawale were playing against the Celebrities. There was a running platform where Bigg Boss sent clothes for both team. Celebrities and Indiawale have to snatch the clothes from each other. They have to wash them, dry them and iron them to fulfill Bigg Boss's order. There was a quality inspector from each team. Rohan from Celebrities and Nitibha from Indiawale was selected quality inspector by Bigg Boss. If the quality inspector rejects the clothes than team will have to wash them again. There were fights between Rohan and Navin and Rahul and Manu. At the end of first day it was cancelled and the day wasted.; On Day 10 there were fights between Rohan and Indiawale team. Bigg Boss changed the rule and announced that whoever sent maximum approved clothes won the task. Navin fell water on Celebrities clothes. As a result, Celebrities can't send maximum approved clothes and loses the task.
Week 2	Result	Won – Indiawale
Week 2	Reward	Indiawale became Malik again and Celebrities remained their sevak.
Week 2	Punishments	On Day 11, when Bigg Boss asked the housemates for the weakest contestant from their respective team to send jail, Celebrities again choose Monalisa. On the other hand, Indiawale choose Swami Om again. On Day 12, Bigg Boss released both of them from jail.
Week 2	Other Tasks	The Immunity Challenge: On Day 11, Indiwale were enjoying the Jacuzzi and the Swimming pool while Bigg Boss announced a task for immunity in the coming nominations. Indiwale had to choose 2 contestants for this task. They choose Navin and Lokesh. They had to convince the housemates to give them their cards and they have to make the card stand until the Buzzer rang. At the end of the task, Lopamudra announced that Navin has more card stand compare to Lokesh.
Week 2	Result	Immuned – Navin
Week 2	Exits	On Day 14, Akanksha Sharma was evicted from the house after facing the public vote.
Week 3	Nominations	On Day 15, Bigg Boss announced that nominations are being held. This time the contestants had to nominate two contestants from their own team. Bani, Lopamudra and Monalisa from the Celebrities and Manveer, Manu, Nitibha and Swami Om from Indiawale are nominated.
Week 3	Tasks	Raja Aur Rank: On Day 16, Bigg Boss announced the luxury budget task for the week. In it Indiawale became a royal family, where Swami Om was the King, Manveer as King's son, Nitibha as Manveer's wife, Lokesh as princess, King's daughter and Navin as Lokesh's husband and Manu played the role of a cunning brother-in-law of the King. Whereas, Celebrities became the royal staff of the royal family, where Rohan as royal entertainer, Karan and Lopamudra as royal cooks, Gaurav as royal advisor, Bani as King's royal bodyguard and Rahul and Antara as royal servants. Celebrities were given a secret task in which they had to create some situations given by Bigg Boss. They were also given a digital camera and they had to hide the camera and this secret task from the opponents.; On Day 17, 2nd day of the task. Swami Om was given a royal bath of milk also in the Jacuzzi and the Swimming Pool. While Celebrities were busy with the secret task the Indiawale were taking their role too seriously and didn't noticed about the secret task. By doing maximum of the secret tasks Celebrities gain the authority of the house.
Week 3	Result	Won – Celebrities
Week 3	Reward	Celebrities became the Malik and Indiawale became their Sevak.
Week 3	Punishments	On Day 17, Bigg Boss asked the housemates for the weakest contestant from their respective team to send jail. Celebrities and Indiawale chose Karan and Nitibha respectively as their weakest members in the task.
Week 3	Other Tasks	The Immunity Challenge: Bigg Boss called Lopamudra to the confession room and told her about the immunity challenge. Celebrities chose Lopamudra, Bani and Monalisa for this task. Navin was handler of the task. In the task, there was a long skateboard where they have to stand. Monalisa was the first to quit the task. After some time when Bigg Boss asked Navin declared Lopamudra as the winner.
Week 3	Result	Immuned – Lopamudra
Week 3	Exit	On Day 21, Swami Om was evicted from the house after facing the public vote. Shortly after his eviction he was sent to the secret room and was kept there for three days before returning to the house.
Week 4	Entrance	On Day 24, Swami Om re-entered the Bigg Boss house after staying in the secret room for three days.
Week 4	Nominations	Telephone Task: Bigg Boss set a telephone on a chair in garden area. Whoever picked up the telephone would be nominated. To save from nomination they had to do task by other housemate. At first, Bani picked up the telephone. Bigg Boss gave her a task where Gaurav had to bleach his eyebrows, which he successfully did. Then Bani nominated Rohan for nomination. Bigg Boss gave him a task where Karan had to shred Nisha Rawal's picture, which he successfully did. Then Rohan nominated Antara. She got a task where Manoj had to cut his doll into pieces, he also successfully did the task. Then Antara nominated Nitibha. Bigg Boss gave Nitibha two choices: She can use her immunity by using the Immunity Medallion or she can play the task, Nitibha chose first choice. Then Nitibha nominated Gaurav. He got a task where Bani had to put down her jacket (that Gauahar Khan gave) into a paint bucket, she also completed the task. Then Gaurav nominated Manu. He got a task where Manveer had to shave his beard, this task was also successfully done. Next up, Manu nominated Manveer. Bigg Boss gave him a task where Rohan had to wear a gown and a makeup like a woman, Rohan refused to do it. Manveer nominated Rahul. He got a task where Navin had to announce that he will never participate in the immunity task, which he also refused to do. Then Rahul nominated Karan. Bigg Boss gave him a task where Lokesh had to nominate herself for the following week, she did the task successfully. Then Karan nominated Navin. He got a task where Nitibha had to give her makeup box to Bigg Boss for the entire season, which she refused to do.
Week 4	Captaincy; Task	Siyasat: On Day 25, Bigg Boss announced that first three housemates who will come to the confession room and register their name will be the contenders of the house captain. Bani, Swami Om and Manu was the first three housemates who came to the confession room. Thus make them the contenders for the respective post. Then Bigg Boss announced a task where three contenders will have three political team. At the end of the task, which team has maximum supporters will win the task. At the end of the task, Bani had 6, Manu had 4 and Swami Om had no one on their support.
Week 4	Result	Won – Bani
Week 4	Reward	Bani became the first captain of the house.
Week 4	Punishments	On Day 26, When Bigg Boss asked to Bani that which two housemates she wants to send in jail, Bani told that she wants Manoj and Swami Om as prisoners.
Week 4	Other Tasks	The Immunity Medallion: On Day 21, Bigg Boss gave all housemates a chance to save themselves from the nominations. In the activity area, Bigg Boss created a stage for the auction in order to gain the Immunity Medallion and announced the rule that if more than one housemates bids for with the same amount then their bid will be cancelled. Then second highest bidder will be the winner. Bigg Boss also announced that this bidding money will be cut off from the winning prize money. After the bidding, Navin, Rahul and Rohan were the highest bidder with the same amount of ₹24,99,998. For this, the second highest bidder Nitibha won the Immunity Medallion by bidding ₹24,99,994. Now she can use this Immunity Medallion for two weeks wherever she wants in this season.
Week 4	Result	Immuned – Nitibha
Week 4	Exit	On Day 28, Navin was the third housemate to evict from the house after facing the public vote.
Week 5
Week 5	Nominations	On Day 29, Bigg Boss asked the housemates to give names of 4 contestants by mutual consent whom they thought were boring for the public. Housemates chose Karan, Lokesh, Antara and Rahul.
Week 5	Task	Lock Down: On Day 30, Bigg Boss introduced the luxury budget task where the housemates need to survive without their basic utilities. Bigg Boss kept their clothes and other essentials in containers placed in the living area. Whenever the gong bell rings, two members of each team got a chance to bring maximum of 4 essentials at a time from the containers. But for whatever essential they picked up, one point was added to their scoreboard. At the end of the task, whoever got maximum points will lose the task. Bigg Boss divided the housemates in two teams. Teams are: Team Rohan: Bani, Karan, Lokesh, Lopamudra, Rahul and Rohan. Team Antara: Gaurav, Manoj, Manveer, Antara, Nitibha and Swami Om.: Bigg Boss gave some mini task where teams had a chance to reduce their points by winning it. Firstly Bigg Boss introduced a task where the challengers from each team need to finish an entire bowl of Rasgulla where 25 rasgullas were there, winner will be able to reduce 12 points from their scoreboard. This task was played by: Team Rohan: Rahul Team Monalisa: Manoj This task was cancelled by Bigg Boss as both captain was not agree to announce the same winner.: Later Bigg Boss gave another task where the challengers from each team need to finish an entire jug of bitter melon juice. winner will be able to take out six essentials from the container. This task was played by: Team Rohan: Lopamudra Team Monalisa : Gaurav This task was won by Team Rohan as Lopamudra finished the bitter melon juice first.: On Day 31, Bigg Boss announced that the task time is over. As Team Monalisa was leading with much points, so Team Rohan won the task.
Week 5	Result	Won – Team Rohan
Week 5	Captaincy; Task	Bigg Boss introduced the first competition, monitored by Nitibha. Where Karan and Lopamudra both had to balance a flower pot on opposite side of a see-saw using one leg and ensuring that see-saw is resting in a straight line. They one who keep balance until end will be winner. At the end of the task, Lopamudra won the task as Karan loose balance and pot falls from see-saw.; Bigg Boss introduced the second competition, where Rahul and Rohan participated. In this task, both challengers had to get wrapped in a sheet of plastic paper, covering them from their shoulder until their knees. Once wrapped, They had to participate in race where they need to cross the finish line by jumping or crawling. The first person to cross the finish line and be standing on their feet will be the winner. At the end of the task, Rohan finally stands up on finish line before Rahul and won task.; Bigg Boss told the housemates that they had to choose a captain from Lopamudra and Rohan. As Nitibha and Swami Om were the worst performers so they couldn't cast their vote as individual, they both had to vote a person. After voting, Rohan got 5 votes and Lopamudra got 4 votes. Thus make Rohan the second captain of the house.
Week 5	Result	Won – Rohan
Week 5	Punishments	On Day 31, When Bigg Boss asked to housemates which two housemates were worst in the task, they told that Nitibha and Swami Om was the worst by mutual consent. They couldn't take the dinner given by Bigg Boss. On Day 32, they couldn't cast their vote as individual for the captaincy task. However, Bigg Boss allowed a mutual vote from them but their vote would only count as of one person.
Week 5	Exit	Double Eviction On Day 34, Karan was evicted from the house by the public vote.; On Day 35, Lokesh was evicted from the house by the public vote.
Week 6	Entrances	On Day 42, there were 4 new wildcard entries in the house. Former housemate Priyanka Jagga re-entered the house with Sahil Anand, Jason Shah and Elena Kazan.
Week 6	Nominations	Viral Video Fever: On Day 36, Bigg Boss introduced a task where housemates had to create a 3 minutes entertaining, sensational video matching the set up provided by Bigg Boss. These videos was judged by Sunny Leone. She was giving thumbs up for liking video and thumbs down for not liking video. At the end of the task, which team got more likes will be declared as the winner and they will be save from the nomination. On the other hand, the opposite team will be nominate for the week. In the task, the housemates were divided into two teams. Teams were the following: Team Lopamudra: Lopamudra, Manu, Antara, Rohan and Swami Om. Team Bani: Bani, Gaurav, Manveer, Nitibha and Rahul.: At the end, Team Lopamudra won the task by 3–2. So all the members of Team Lopamudra were immuned for the following week's nomination and all the members of Team Bani were nominated.
Week 6	Result	Won – Team Lopamudra
Week 6	Captaincy; Task	BB Gold Mine: Bigg Boss introduced a gold mining task that was in the garden area. The task involved digging out gold and Bigg Boss announced that if Rohan inherits most of the gold he will be allowed to extend his captaincy for the following week.; Shortly after announcing the task Bigg Boss called Lopamudra to the Confession Room where she was assigned a secret task. The task was that if Lopamudra and Manu successfully could get 50% of the gold that Rohan had, then Rohan would be removed from his captaincy and they would become the candidates for the position.; At the end of the task, Bigg Boss announced that Lopamudra and Manoj had failed in their secret task. Hence, making Rohan's captainship extended for one more week.
Week 6	Result	Won – Rohan
Week 6	Reward	Rohan got the opportunity to remain captain for one more week.
Week 6	Punishments	Bigg Boss gave a task to the captain Rohan to choose the four worst performers in the task. Rohan choose Lopamudra, Antara, Nitibha and Swami Om. Then Bigg Boss gave them a punishment task named Rohan Ki Kathputliyan. In this task Rohan had to choose which punishment he wanted to give to his selected worst performers. Rohan decided to give the 1st punishment to Swami Om, where he had to eat 2 plates of butter. Rohan also gave the 2nd punishment to Swami Om, where Swami Om had to remain on stretcher until Bigg Boss's next order. Rohan gave the 3rd punishment for Nitibha to go in the jail.
Week 6	Exit	There was no eviction this week as voting lines were closed for the following week.
Week 7	Nominations	The Dome: Bigg Boss announced a new nomination task called the Dome. The challengers or the four new wildcard contestants were instructed to pick one other contestant who is not a wild card. The task involved for the challenger and the other housemate to stay in the dome as long as possible, the first person to leave the dome would be nominated from each pair. Bigg Boss also stated that you can annoy the other person that is in your dome. The pairs were the following; Gaurav and Jason; Bani and Priyanka; Nithiba and Elena; Rahul and Sahil; The first contestant to leave his/her dome was Rahul Dev who had to leave because he had to use the restroom, hence making him nominated and making Sahil safe. The second contestant to leave his/her dome was Elena Kazan hence making Nitibha safe. The third contestant who exited his/her dome was Jason Shah who also had to use the restroom making him nominated and saving Gaurav Chopra. That left Priyanka and Bani who stayed until 3:30 AM, had ended the task by Bani saving Priyanka by exiting the dome first. They decided to keep it secret until Bigg Boss announced the nominated houseguests.; The nominated houseguests are: Rahul, Elena, Jason and Bani
Week 7	Result	
Week 7	Captaincy; Task	Captaincy Gayi Pani Mein: After Rohan's ejection from his captaincy Bigg Boss announced that all the remaining houseguests except for the nominated would be a part of this task, Priyanka was the moderator of the taskBigg Boss said she would automatically become a candidate for Captain if she successfully completes her responsibilities. Each houseguest had a test tube that was dedicated to a person, when Bigg Boss played a gong which would happen seven times. Someone would need to empty their test tube in the bowl. After this task was concluded Bigg Boss said the last two remaining would become the nominees for captainship. Priyanka failed to become a nominee. The final two were Manveer and Gaurav.; After Bigg Boss created a canvas and to win Captainship Manveer (yellow) and Gaurav (blue) would have to paint the canvas with their respective paints for two hours after Bigg Boss announced the time was up, Lopamudra Raut was the moderator of this competition. After painting Manveer slipped and fell, and injured himself by cutting his head. Bigg Boss paused the test and sent a medic to the confession room where Manveer was healed. After coming out Bigg Boss told Lopamudra that the task had concluded because the medic said that Manveer could not continue. Since Blue and Yellow make Green Lopamudra saw blue more than green and she said that Gaurav had won the task.
Week 7	Result	Won – Gaurav
Week 7	Reward	
Week 7	Other Tasks	
Week 7	Result	
Week 7	Punishments	On Day 44 Bigg Boss announced that Rohan would be ejected from his captaincy due to not fulfilling the responsibilities. He was also punished with the fact that he could never become a captain for the rest of the season.
Week 7	Exit	On Day 49, Elena was the 6th Housemate to be evicted after facing public vote.
Week 8	Nominations	Housemates had to decide on who they want to nominate out of the wild cards Priyanka, Jason, Sahil. Everyone took Priyanka's name.
Week 8	Tasks	BB Taxi Stand: Manveer and Bani have are taxi drivers while Priyanka is the traffic police women. Bani and Manveer both have to take the inmates for a ride and then they can give money to them. Priyanka will be the strict traffic police women and cane the housemates if they break any rules. The inmate with the most money will have a chance to participate in the captaincy round.
Week 8	Result	Won – Priyanka
Week 8	Captaincy; Task	Appy Fizz Feel the Fizz: Gaurav and Priyanka have to select 4 supporters each to keep them raised up in the air as high while they are tied to a harness. The one who hold for the most longest becomes the captain for next week.
Week 8	Result	Won – Priyanka
Week 8	Reward	
Week 8	Other Tasks	
Week 8	Result	
Week 8	Punishments	Gaurav was given a chance to punish two housemates whose hard work was less in the BB Taxi Stand task. He chose Swami Om and Lopamudra.
Week 8	Exit	On Day 56, Sahil was evicted from the house after facing the public vote.; On Day 56, Priyanka was said to be evicted from the house but was sent to the secret room.
Week 9	Nominations	Bigg Boss asks each contestant to wear a belt with a balloon attached to it. During the task, five buzzers will ring and after every buzzer, one contestant is required to nominate another contestant by bursting his/her balloon supported by a justified reason. Om Swami is made the sanchalak(referee) of the task. As a result, Bani, Lopamudra, Manveer, Nitibha and Rahul.
Week 9	Tasks	BB Democracy: Bigg Boss introduces a luxury budget task – BB Democracy which will have an effect on the subsequent captaincy task. Based on situations given by Bigg Boss, the contestants will need to take decisions by selecting options from a voting panel. With just a minute to vote, the contestants will not be allowed to discuss their choices. Adding a twist to the task, the final decision will rest in Priyanka and Manu's which inmates don't know, inmate would think that they took that decision.
Week 9	Result	Won – Bani, Lopamudra and Manveer
Week 9	Captaincy; Task	The captaincy task is introduced wherein the three contenders Bani, Lopamudra, and Manveer are required to hold a ring for a considerable amount of time. A ring would be given to all the three contestants, which they have to hold for the longest time. Anyone who will let go of the ring will get eliminated from the task. The one who survives until the end will become the captain of the house. Other inmates can show support to their favorite contestant, Antara will be referee of task.
Week 9	Result	Won – Lopamudra
Week 9	Reward	
Week 9	Other Tasks	Bigg Boss gives Priyanka, Om Swami, Bani, Gaurav, and Nitibha a chance to turn their punishment into a reward. Five chosen housemates are asked to stand in the garden area in front of 5 cylinders and grab a gift that pops out of it following a blast. If they become successful in grabbing the gift, they get an exemption from the punishment and also the gift that they are entitled to. by grabbing gift boxes that will pop out of a cylinder following a blast. All five contestants are asked to stand in front of 5 different cylinders and wait for their turn.
Week 9	Result	Won – Lopamudra
Week 9	Punishments	Bigg Boss asks Lopamudra to choose any five contestants who she wants to punish supported by a valid reason. She nominates Swami Om, Priyanka, Gaurav, Bani and Nitibha.; Bigg Boss asks Lopamudra to nominate two contestants she wants to put in jail and one has to follow her around the house with a placard saying "I am sorry Lopa". She chose Priyanka and Swami Om to go to jail and Bani to follow her with placard,
Week 9	Exit	On Day 63, Rahul was evicted from the house after facing the public vote.
Week 10	Nominations	Bigg Boss asks the housemates to gather in the living area for the week's nominations process. Swami is safe as he got immunity. Lopa, being the captain of the house is safe from nominations, gets a special power to nominate one contestant directly and she chooses Bani. Every housemate had to nominate 2 housemates. As a result, Bani, Gaurav and Antara get nominated for this week's eviction.
Week 10	Tasks	BB Hostel: Bigg Boss announces the luxury budget task for the week- BB hostel. For the task, the house is divided into two halves- the living area, bedroom and kitchen area is the girl's hostel where all the ladies of the house have to reside. On the other hand, the garden area is a gurukul style boys hostel where all the men have to be stationed. Priyanka and Swami Om are given the responsibility to be the khadus (strict) wardens of the girls and boys hostel respectively. The contestants have to play in pairs as boyfriends and girlfriends and exchange love letter by tricking their respective wardens. Pairs are Gaurav-Bani, Rohan-Lopamudra, Nitibha-Manveer, Manu-Antara. The winning jodi will become the contender for captaincy. If pairs are not able to exchange at least 20letters then Swami and Priyanka will win task and will become contender for captaincy, and if pairs are able to exchange more than 20 letters then the pair which have exchanged most letters will become contender for captaincy. Restroom area will be common part of house.
Week 10	Result	Housemates were unsuccessful due to the behaviour of Swami and Priyanka
Week 10	Captaincy; Task	—N/a
Week 10	Result	—N/a
Week 10	Reward	—N/a
Week 10	Other Tasks	UC browser: Bigg Boss introduces UC browser task wherein 3 trending contestants Antara, Manveer and Rohan get to see three controversial clips about them in the UC Browser booth.; Bani and Gaurav's date: Bigg Boss had set up a date for Bani and Gaurav.; Family App Task: Bigg Boss announces the ‘Family App task’ wherein they can reunite with their near and dear ones. As per the task, a battery will be placed in the living area and charged up to 100%. Bigg Boss will call the contestants individually in the activity area and give them four options to choose from and meet their family members. Options entail meeting in person for 2 minutes, meeting in person for 10 minutes, phone call, written message. Every time a contestant chooses an option, the battery will decrease by a certain percentage. Manu and Om Swami are made to be the batteries and they have to make sure that the app's battery never drains out, the battery can decrease if rules are broken, and if the battery gets low then the task will end. Manu and Swami Om will be given chances to charge the battery as well.
Week 10	Result	—N/a
Week 10	Punishments	—N/a
Week 10	Exit	There was no eviction this week as voting lines were closed for the following week.; On Day 69, Priyanka was ejected from the house on Day 70 after her bad behaviour towards Salman Khan.
Week 11	Nominations	As there was no eviction last week. Bani, Gaurav and Monalisa are nominated this week as well.
Week 11	Tasks	Toofan: Bigg Boss introduces the new luxury budget task ‘Toofan’(storm) which will also impact captaincy. The house is turned into a snow clad region with a huge igloo placed in the garden area. The housemates are required to dress up as Kashmiris in Phiran and build or repair the igloo with the help of the equipment provided. Time and again, a snow storm will hit the house when the contestants are required to take shelter in the igloo and the last contestant to enter will be disqualified from the task and captaincy. They have to repaint igloo too, there will be total 7storms, nobody can enter igloo before storm. The contestants who are last to remaining in igloo will be contender for next captaincy.
Week 11	Result	Won – Manveer and Rohan
Week 11	Captaincy; Task	Bigg Boss announces the captaincy task wherein Manveer and Rohan compete to become the next captain of the house. A mud bed is placed in the garden area and Rohan and Manveer are allotted two different set of flowers – Rohan (purple) and Manveer (Pink). After the buzzer rings, Manveer and Rohan have to plant the flowers on the mud bed and cover it completely with their respective share of flowers. They are given two hours to complete the task and Bani is made the sanchalika(referee) of the task. Other inmates can try to make their friend win but only Manveer and Rohan can sow or pluck flowers. The one plants more flowers will become captain.
Week 11	Result	Won – Manveer
Week 11	Reward	—N/a
Week 11	Other Tasks	Bani and Gaurav's show: Bigg Boss asked Nitibha to read this task to the housemates. Bigg Boss gives the housemates a golden opportunity to win back their luxury budget by being a part of a new task- Bani and Gaurav's show. According to the task, a volley of hard-hitting questions by audience will be thrown at Bani and Gaurav while they are in the confession room of which they have to give honest and satisfactory answers. While Gaurav and Bani are told that the questions will be coming from the live audience, if they are not honest then luxury budget will be affected.
Week 11	Result	Failed – Bani and Gaurav
Week 11	Punishments	Rohan was punished by getting nominated all season after he slapped Swami Om.; Manveer, to choose two contestants whom he wants to lock inside the jail as punishment. He chooses Swami Om and Gaurav.
Week 11	Exit	On Day 77, Gaurav was evicted from the house after facing the public vote.
Week 12	Nominations	Captain Manveer was safe from nominations. In this Nominations Bigg Boss paired up housemates and were called to the Confession Room. In which, they had to mutually decide which one of them to be nominated. If they don't come to a decision, both of them will get nominated. And they are not allowed to talk anything what happened in the Confession Room. These were the pairs: Bani and Swami Om (they didn't come to a decision hence both were nominated); Antara and Manu (they nominated Monalisa); Lopamudra and Nitibha (they didn't come to a decision hence both were nominated); As a result, Rohan, Monalisa, Bani, Swami Om, Lopamudra and Nitibha were nominated for this week's eviction.
Week 12	Tasks	Maalgaadi: Bigg Boss announces the next luxury budget task, Maalgaadi (goods train). Bigg Boss says Rohan and Antara will act as the jailers in the Maalgaadi task while the rest of the housemates will be the prisoners. Rohan and Antara are required to continuously rotate the levers placed near the engine while the prisoners have to survive for a considerable amount of time inside the jail. After every siren, Rohan and Antara will get a chance to free one prisoner and deliver him or her to Bigg Boss. If they become successful in doing so, the amount attributed or bid to that particular contestant will be added to the overall winning amount. If the prisoners free themselves by their own will, they will become the contenders for this week's captaincy task but amount bid on him or her could not be added to the prize money. The frequency of the siren will directly be proportional to the speed of the train.; Rohan and Antara are in confession room. Bigg boss says they can increase prize money to 50 lacs again by doing task. He asks them to attribute or bid a certain amount of money against the names of the rest of the housemates. Accrediting the least amount to Om Swami and Nitibha, the two bid the lowest on them. Lopamudra and Manveer are attributed the highest amount followed by Manu and Bani. Bidding amounts per inmates are: Rs 11,00,000 on Lopa; 9,99,00 on Manveer; 7,00,200 on Manu; 6,00,350 on Bani; 1,00,000 on Niti; 444 on Swami
Week 12	Result	Won – Bani and Swami
Week 12	Captaincy; Task	Bigg Boss introduces the captaincy task wherein Bani and Om Swami compete against each other and Manveer is made the Sanchalak (referee). For the task, two pyramids of miniature blocks with Bani and Om Swami's pictures are placed in the garden area on two tables. While the contestants are given an option to destroy the pyramid of the contender they do not wish to support by throwing squishy balls at them to displace it by staying outside the border line of pyramids. Bani and Om Swami have to protect their pyramids. They also have the liberty to build it all over again, contenders of captaincy and attack each other's pyramids using balls after coming out of border line. The contender with a maximum number of blocks standing in a shape of a pyramid by the end of the task will be declared as the winner. Taking into consideration that both Bani and Om Swami are feeling unwell, Bigg Boss also gives them the option to pick up a representative who will perform the task on their behalf.
Week 12	Result	Task was cancelled after Swami Om threw his urine on Bani and Rohan. Bani did not become captain.
Week 12	Reward	—N/a
Week 12	Other Tasks	Oppo 2017 Calendar: Bigg Boss introduces the launch of Oppo 2017 calendar task wherein the contestants have to use OPPO selfie expert camera phone to click pictures at designated locations inside the house. In the given time the contestants are asked to capture interesting selfies and share it with Bigg Boss. Om Swami is made the director of the task while Manveer plays the role of assistant director.
Week 12	Result	—N/a
Week 12	Punishments	Swami Om was thrown in jail after he threw his urine on Bani and Rohan. He was later thrown out of the house by Bigg Boss.
Week 12	Exit	On Day 81, Swami Om was ejected from the house on Day 81 after his disgusting acts towards other contestants.; There was no eviction this week as voting lines were closed for the following week.
Week 13	Nominations	As last week was no eviction, Rohan, Antara, Bani, Lopamudra and Nitibha have been nominated again for this week's eviction.
Week 13	Tasks	BB Solar System: Bigg Boss introduces the much-awaited ticket to finale week qualifier task. For the same, the entire garden area is converted into a night sky and a solar system set up is installed there with four orbits in it. The contestants have to hold a bowl containing purple liquid in their hands and rotate around the ticket (sun) starting with the first orbit. nmates have two objective, one is to protect their liquid and spill others liquid. Every time a contestants’ water spills or goes down beyond the yellow mark, or in case a contestant trips and falls due to some reason, he or she will be disqualified from the game. The competition will then move to the next level and the contestants will have to start walking in the second orbit by filling bowls again. Last two contestants to successfully complete the task will get a chance to grab ticket to finale week. Rohan is made the sanchalak (referee) of the task while Lopamudra gets an extra edge over others and is asked to join in the second round as she was on 1st position in ranking task.; Bigg Boss introduces the first leg of the ticket to finale week task where Bani, Manu, Manveer, Antara and Nitibha have to go around the orbit with their bowls. Failed: Antara; Bigg Boss introduces the second leg of the ticket finale week task where Bani, Manveer, Manu, Lopamudra and Nitibha are continuing to go around the orbit. Failed: Lopamudra; Bigg Boss introduces the third leg of the ticket finale week task where Bani, Manu, Manveer and Nitibha are continuing to go around the orbit. Failed: Nitibha; Bigg Boss introduces the next leg of the ticket to finale week task and Bani, Manu and Manveer step on the last most difficult orbit with water bowls in their hand, they can take place on orbit and move at speed as they want but have to protect their bowls. Failed: Bani; Bigg boss announces final task for finale week ticket, there will be task between Manu and Manveer to win ticket to finale week. They will go to shopping mall and have to convince people to vote for them to make them win ticket to finale week. Failed: Manu, Winner: Manveer; Manveer has got 472 votes; Manu has got 338 votes.
Week 13	Result	Won – Manveer
Week 13	Captaincy; Task	—N/a
Week 13	Result	—N/a
Week 13	Reward	Manveer and Manu gets to meet the public in a shopping mall so that they can get votes form them.
Week 13	Other Tasks	BB Rank Task: Bigg Boss introduces the ranking task as a build-up to the ticket to finale week task. The contestants are made to rank themselves in the order of 1 to 6 after mutual decision and claim their position by standing on a ranking podium. Bigg Boss also informs them that the task will have direct implications on the ticket to finale task and the one with the highest rank will get an edge over other contestants. Rohan is made the sanchalak (referee) of the task since he is nominated for the entire season. Positions are: Antara-6th, Manveer-5th, Manu-4th, Nitibha-3rd, Bani-2nd, Lopamudra-1st.
Week 13	Other Tasks	—N/a
Week 13	Other Tasks	:BB Call Centre: Bigg Boss introduces the luxury budget task BB Call Centre wherein the housemates are divided into two teams- call centre executives and customers. While Manveer, Manu and Lopamudra are given the responsibility of the call centre executives who have to patiently listen to their customers’ complain, Bani, Rohan and Nitibha are asked to be the cranky callers. While the executives have to maintain their composure and try to give a suitable solution to the customer's problems, customers have to make sure that they irritate the executives and instigate them to disconnect the call. Antara will be referee and there will punishments whoever loose task.
Week 13	Other Tasks	Housemates were unsuccessful and task was cancelled after Bani and Lopamudra fight
Week 13	Punishments	—N/a
Week 13	Exit	On Day 91, Nitibha was evicted from the house after facing the public vote.
Week 14	Nominations	Bigg Boss introduces the nominations task for the week with yet another twist. Dressed up as a postman, every contestant is assigned a parcel of one of their fellow contestant which they have to either deliver or destroy in a foyer. If they fail to destroy and instead deliver it successfully to other inmate, they will be nominated for the week while the contestant owning the parcel will be safe from nomination and vice versa. They have to burn parcel in furnace of other inmate to save themselves from nominations. The parcel would entail gifts or letters sent by their family or loved ones. Since Manveer has already qualified into the finale week and since Rohan is nominated for the entire season, they are made the sanchalaks(referee) of the task.; Antara have Manu's parcel; Manu will have Bani's parcel; Bani will have Lopamudra's parcel; Lopamudra will have Antara's parcel; They have to open parcel before burning it and once parcel is opened, they have to burn it. As a result, Rohan and Antara are nominated for this week's eviction.
Week 14	Tasks	Shopping Task: Bigg Boss gives the housemates an opportunity to do luxury budget shopping. In the garden area, the luxury budget items are placed on a table with a plastic string attached to it. The housemates are asked to form a chain and pass on the luxury budget items of their choice by holding it with their mouth. While the housemates were entitled to get 10 mins for the process but they only get 6 mins because of Manveer and Lopamudra's slipups, Lopa reading letter from furnace and Manveer breaking smoking room's rules, Manu can use this luxury budget too, Bigg Boss also lifts the ban imposed on Manu to not use the luxury budget items.
Week 14	Result	Housemates were successful
Week 14	Captaincy; Task	—N/a
Week 14	Result	
Week 14	Reward	—N/a
Week 14	Other Tasks	Antara and Vikrant's Shaadi: Bigg Boss makes an official announcement about Antara and Vikrant getting married in the house and that the contestants will have to take all the responsibilities of the wedding as her fellow inmates, they will get married tomorrow, their families will come in house on wedding day. Amongst the contestants, Lopamudra, Rohan and Manu are asked to be on the bride-side while Bani and Manveer are made to be on the groom-side. Inmates are so excited for wedding. The contestants are asked to start the preparations and begin the wedding rituals with Haldi ceremony. Bigg Boss provides them with all the things required for the ceremony and asks the housemates to perform the rituals, both groom and bride side have to keep trying to make their haldi ceremony more entertaining. Bigg boss announces that the rituals will soon commence with Antara's mehendi ceremony and some guests will come in house, female inmates will get to put mehndi on her hands. Clothes are in store room. Manveer says Rohan and Lopaudra get ready fast, Bani will take care of her food. Garden is decorated for the grand wedding reception that is to be held in the garden area. Manu and Manveer are given the responsibility to host the evening and make it an entertaining one. When the housemates enter the garden area, they find a brightly lit stage placed right in the center where they have to give their performances.
Week 14	Other Tasks	—N/a
Week 14	Other Tasks	:Saving Nominations: Bigg Boss introduces another challenging task that will give the contestants an extra edge to save themselves from the upcoming nominations which are last nominations, the team losing will have disadvantage in last nominations. The housemates are divided into two teams- Team Manu consisting of Manveer, Lopamudra, Manu while Team Rohan consisting of Antara, Bani, Rohan. Bigg Boss announces that it is time for role reversals — Bani J, Rohan Mehra and Antara Biswas are to hold on to the red mark while being pulled back by a harness. Manu, Manveer and Lopamudra, meanwhile, will try and disturb them. Team Manu held mark for 4:30hours due to Manveer's hard work. Team Manu have to make sure that they make all three members of team Rohan to leave marks before 4:30 hours to win task.
Week 14	Other Tasks	Won – Lopamudra, Manu and Manveer
Week 14	Punishments	—N/a
Week 14	Exit	On Day 97, Antara was evicted from the house after facing the public vote.
Week 15
Week 15	Tasks	BB Dhaba: Bigg Boss introduces the BB Dhaba task wherein the housemates are divided into two teams- Lopamudra- Rohan and Manu-Bani and have to cook some delicious food in the given time frame. Manveer is chosen to be the sanchalak(referee/judge) and owner of the dhaba who will get food orders from Bigg Boss and ensure that both the teams prepare it in the given time limit.; A dhaba-like set up is put up in the garden area consisting of a stove place which both the teams have to share to cook food. The housemates are asked to dress up like dhaba chefs with aprons and gamchas and pick up all the required ingredients from the store room every time they get an order, Lopa and Bani have only 3 minutes to pick up ingredients from the store room. After the task completion gong rings, both the teams have to get Manveer to taste their dishes and while he decides whether to accept or reject the dish. However, the final decision lies with Bigg Boss as Manveer will send most delicious dish to store room.
Week 15	Happenings	Day 98 : Bani, Manu and Manveer are asked to go to the activity area and are asked to sit in front of a LED screen flashing ‘Grand Finale’ on it and are asked to evaluate their performance on the show. Basis all their weakness and strength, they have to draw a conclusion as to which contestant will get eliminated from the grand finale run and in what particular order. After they decide the order, contestants have to leave the finale room in that particular sequence as and when the signature tune of the show rings.; Day 99: Bigg Boss asked the housemates to cook some delicious foods. The house is divided in two teams.; Day 101: Bigg Boss introduces mela task wherein the garden area is turned into a fair and the housemates are allotted different stalls. There will be five stalls and each inmate will get a stall. At regular intervals, guests will enter the house and the contestants will have to entertain them at their respective stalls, guests will give them points on basis of their entertaining. Rohan will be horse in task, he will walk like horse on guest's requests. Manu is selected to hit the Joker stall wherein the guests can make the housemates as targets and hit them with a sponge dipped in soap water. Manveer is chosen for questions and dare stalls wherein he will ask questions to the guests and can take a dare in return. Lopamudra has to take care of the massage counter while Rohan is made to be a horse wearing a costume and a mask. Bani has become "baba" where she has to talk about inmates on request of guests. Bigg Boss also announces the next results for eviction. Bani and Rohan come and Bigg Boss says Rohan is vote out.; Day 102: The Mela task is continued and Evicted contestant Naveen Prakash and Season 9 finalist Rishabh Sinha enters to show their opinions to the contestants.; Day 103: Bigg Boss shows the 4 finalists Bani, Lopamudra, Manu and Manveer's journey to them.; Day 104: There is a debate with Celebrities vs Commoners where Farah Khan, Ravi Dubey, Malishka RJ and Bigg Boss 8's Puneet Issar came to ask them questions.
Week 15	Exit	On Day 102, Rohan was evicted from the house after facing the public vote.
Week 15	Finalists	
Week 15	Winner	Manveer Gurjar
Week 15	1st Runner-Up	Bani Judge
Week 15	2nd Runner-up	Lopamudra Raut
Week 15	Walked,3rd Runner-up	Manu Punjabi

== Nominations table ==
	Week 1	Week 2	Week 3	Week 4	Week 5	Week 6	Week 7	Week 8	Week 9	Week 10	Week 11	Week 12	Week 13	Week 14	Week 15		
	Week 1	Week 2	Week 3	Week 4	Week 5	Week 6	Week 7	Week 8	Week 9	Week 10	Week 11	Week 12	Week 13	Week 14	Day 101	Day 105	
Nominees for Captaincy	No; Captain				Bani; Manu; Swami Om	Karan; Lopamudra; Rahul; Rohan	Lopamudra; Manu; Rohan	Gaurav; Manveer	Gaurav; Priyanka	Bani; Lopamudra; Manveer	No; Captain	Manveer; Rohan	Bani; Swami Om	No; Captain			
House Captain	No; Captain				Bani	Rohan		Gaurav	~~Priyanka~~	Lopamudra		Manveer			No; Captain		
Captain's Nominations	No; Captain				Not eligible			Priyanka; Lopamudra; Manveer	Captain; Evicted	Bani	Not eligible	Not eligible	No nominations	Not eligible	No; Captain		
Jail Nominations	Antara; Swami Om	Antara; Swami Om	Karan; Nitibha	Manu; Swami Om	No Jail; Punishment	Bani; Nitibha	No Jail; Punishment		Priyanka; Swami Om	No Jail; Punishment	Gaurav; Swami Om	Swami Om	Jail Tasks Ended				
Vote to:	Evict			Save / Evict	Evict	Task	None	Evict		Evict	None	Evict	None	Save / Evict	None	WIN	
Manveer	Lopamudra; Antara	Gaurav; Rohan	Nitibha; Swami Om	Manu (to save); Rahul (to evict)	Karan; Lokesh; Rahul; Rohan	Nominated	Safe	Sahil; Bani	Rahul	Gaurav; Antara	Not eligible	House; Captain			No; Nominations	No; Nominations	Winner (Day 105)
Bani	Manu; Priyanka	Manu; Manveer	Lopamudra; Antara	Rohan (to evict); Gaurav (to save)	House; Captain	Nominated	Nominated against Priyanka	Priyanka; Rahul; Lopamudra	Lopamudra; Nitibha	Manu; Antara	Nominated	Swami Om	No; Nominations	Lopumudra's Parcel Destroyed	No; Nominations	No; Nominations	1st runner-up (Day 105)
Lopamudra	Manu; Priyanka	Manveer; Nitibha	Bani; Karan	Safe	Gaurav; Karan; Manu; Manveer	Safe	Safe	Priyanka; Bani; Nitibha	Bani	House; Captain		Nitibha	No; Nominations	Antara's Parcel Destroyed	No; Nominations	No; Nominations	2nd runner-up (Day 105)
Manu	Bani; Gaurav	Gaurav; Rohan	Nitibha; Swami Om	Antara (to save); Manveer (to evict)	Karan; Lokesh; Rahul; Rohan	Safe	Safe	Walked (Day 48)	Secret Room (Days 57-59)	Gaurav; Priyanka	Not eligible	Antara	Safe	Bani's Parcel Destroyed	No; Nominations	No; Nominations	Walked, 3rd runner-up (Day 105)
Rohan	Manu; Priyanka	Manu; Manveer	Bani; Antara	Antara (to evict)	Gaurav; Manu; Manveer; Antara	House; Captain		Priyanka; Sahil; Bani	Not eligible	Antara; Priyanka	Not eligible	Nominated	No; Nominations	Nominated	No; Nominations	Evicted (Day 102)	
Antara	Manu; Priyanka	Akanksha; Nitibha	Bani; Lopamudra	Nitibha (to evict)	Karan; Lokesh; Rahul; Rohan	Safe	Safe	Priyanka; Sahil; Rohan	Not eligible	Gaurav; Priyanka	Nominated	Antara	No; Nominations	Manu's Parcel Delivered	Evicted (Day 97)		
Nitibha	Antara; Rahul	Lopamudra; Antara	Manu; Manveer	Gaurav (to evict)	Karan; Manveer; Antara; Rahul	Nominated	Safe against Elena	Priyanka; Sahil; Bani	Not eligible	Gaurav; Antara	Not eligible	Lopamudra	No; Nominations	Evicted (Day 90)			
Swami Om	Bani; Gaurav	Bani; Gaurav	Manu; Manveer	Secret Room (Days 22-24)	Karan; Lokesh; Antara; Rahul	Safe	Safe	Walked (Day 48)	Safe	Manu; Manveer	Not eligible	Bani	Ejected (Day 81)				
Gaurav	Manu; Priyanka	Manu; Manveer	Bani; Rahul	Bani (to save); Manu (to evict)	Karan; Lokesh; Antara; Rahul	Nominated	Safe against Jason	House; Captain	Not eligible	Antara; Nitibha	Nominated	Evicted (Day 77)					
Priyanka	Bani; Gaurav	Evicted (Day 7)					Safe against Bani	Jason; Sahil	Secret Room (Days 57-59)	Antara; Nitibha	Ejected (Day 69)						
Rahul	Manu; Priyanka	Akanksha; Swami Om	Karan; Antara	Karan (to evict)	Karan; Lokesh; Manu; Antara	Nominated	Nominated against Sahil	Priyanka; Bani; Sahil	Manveer	Evicted (Day 63)							
Sahil	Not In House						Safe against Rahul	Manveer; Nitibha	Evicted (Day 55)								
Jason	Not In House						Nominated against Gaurav	Rohan; Antara	Walked (Day 55)								
Elena	Not In House						Nominated against Nitibha	Evicted (Day 49)									
Lokesh	Lopamudra; Antara	Gaurav; Antara	Manu; Swami Om	Lokesh (to evict); Karan (to save)	Gaurav; Karan; Manveer; Rahul	Evicted (Day 35)											
Karan	Manu; Priyanka	Manu; Manveer	Lopamudra; Antara	Rohan (to save)	Lokesh; Manu; Antara; Rahul	Evicted (Day 34)											
Navin	Gaurav; Rahul	Gaurav; Rohan	Manu; Swami Om	Rahul (to evict)	Evicted (Day 28)												
Akanksha	Antara; Rahul	Antara; Rahul	Evicted (Day 14)														
Notes	1	2	3,4	5,6,7	8,9,10	None							11,	11,12	11,13	14,15	16,17
Against public vote	Antara; Gaurav; Manu; Priyanka	Akanksha; Antara; Gaurav; Manu; Manveer; Nitibha; Rohan	Antara; Bani; Lopamudra; Manu; Manveer; Nitibha; Swami Om	Lokesh; Manveer; Navin; Rahul	Antara; Karan; Lokesh; Rahul	Bani; Gaurav; Manveer; Nitibha; Rahul	Bani; Elena; Jason; Rahul	Bani; Lopamudra; Manveer; Nitibha; Priyanka; Rohan; Sahil	Bani; Lopamudra; Manveer; Nitibha; Rahul	Antara; Bani; Gaurav	Antara; Bani; Gaurav	Antara; Bani; Lopamudra; Nitibha; Rohan; Swami Om	Antara; Bani; Lopamudra; Nitibha; Rohan	Antara; Rohan	Bani; Rohan	Bani; Lopamudra; Manveer; Manu	
Re-entered	none						Priyanka	Swami Om	Priyanka	none							
Re-entered	none						Priyanka	Swami Om	Manu	none							
Secret Room	none			Swami Om^{1}	none				Priyanka	none							
Secret Room	none			Swami Om^{1}	none				Manu	none							
Walked	none						Swami Om	Jason	none								
Walked	none						Manu	Jason	none								
Ejected	none									Priyanka	none	Swami Om	none				
Evicted	Priyanka	Akanksha	No; Eviction	Navin	Karan	No; Eviction	Elena	Sahil	Rahul	Eviction; Cancelled	Gaurav	Eviction postponed	Nitibha	Antara	Rohan	Manu	Lopamudra
Evicted	Priyanka	Akanksha	No; Eviction	Navin	Lokesh	No; Eviction	Elena	Priyanka	Rahul	Eviction; Cancelled	Gaurav	Eviction postponed	Nitibha	Antara	Rohan	Bani	Manveer

Color Key

indicates that the Housemate was directly nominated for eviction.
indicates that the Housemate was immune prior to nominations.
indicates the winner.
indicates the first runner up.
indicates the second runner up.
indicates the third runner up.
indicates the contestant has been evicted.
indicates the contestant walked out due to emergency.
indicates the contestant has been ejected.
house captain.
indicates the contestant is nominated.

1. Swami Om was evicted by the regular eviction process however in accordance with the secret room twist he was moved to a temporary abode and later returned in the week that followed.
2. Priyanka was evicted in the double eviction on Day 57. However, she was moved to the secret room and later returned to the house.
3. Priyanka was asked to leave the house by host of the show Salman Khan after a heated exchange with him during which he threatened to quit presenting the show from there on and for future seasons if Priyanka did not exit the house. Priyanka Left the house under the circumstances. It is unknown whether her decision was influenced by the producers but is strongly alleged. The nominations were carry forwarded because she was ejected.
4. Swami Om was ejected from the house after he threw his urine which he had stored in a container on Bani and Rohan during the captaincy task.
5. Manveer was made house captain for three weeks following a task he won for eternal immunity.
6. Following an offer presented to all housemates by Bigg Boss, Manu chose to take the ₹10 lakh and left the house.

=== Nomination notes ===
- ^1 All the Celebrities had to nominate 2 Indiawale by mutual consent.
- ^2 On Day 8, Housemates nominated face to face, with each Housemate nominated two Housemates from their opposite team.
- ^3 Navin was immune for Week 3 from nomination by winning The Immunity Challenge.
- ^4 After Swami Om's eviction, he was sent to secret room.
- ^5 All the housemates nominated a housemate for nomination and also to sit on the Telephone Task chair.
- ^6 Lopamudra was immune for Week 4 from nomination by winning The Immunity Challenge.
- ^7 Nitibha was also immune for Week 4 by using The Immunity Medallion.
- ^8 All the housemates nominated 4 housemates by mutual consent.
- ^9 Swami Om was immune for Week 5 from nomination as he returned as a Wild Card Entry that week.
- ^10 Nitibha was also immune for Week 5 by using The Immunity Medallion.
- ^11 Rohan was eternally nominated as punishment for physically assaulting Swami Om.
- ^12 Manveer qualified for the final week after winning the "Ticket to Finale" task.
- ^13 Each housemate was assigned a parcel of one of their fellow contestant which they have to either deliver or destroy in a foyer. If they fail to destroy and instead deliver it successfully, they will get nominated for the week while the contestant owning the parcel will be safe from nomination. Mona got Manu's, Manu got Bani's, Bani got Lopamudra's and Lopamudra got Mona's parcel. Only Mona delivered her parcel. Hence, nominating herself.
- ^14 Rohan was spared from his eternal nomination for the last nomination process.
- ^15 Housemates were divided into two teams. For winning the task Team Manu consisting of Lopamudra, Manu and Manveer was declared safe from the last nominations, making it to the finals. On the other hand, Team Rohan consisting of Bani, Monalisa and Rohan was nominated. As Monalisa and Rohan were already nominated, whoever survived the eviction was to be tagged with Bani for the last eviction before the finale.
- ^16 During the final week the public initially voted for who they wanted to save between Bani and Rohan. Audience voted for the four remaining housemates to win Bigg Boss, the three housemates with the fewest votes were evicted on Day 105 (the finale) with the Winner revealed on the same night.
