= Karan Mehra =

Indian actor, model and fashion designer

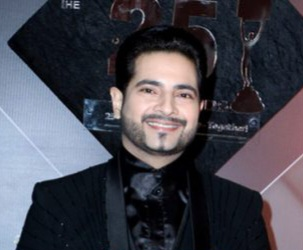
- Mehra in 2025
- Born: 10 September 1982 (age 44); Jalandhar, Punjab, India
- Occupations: Actor; model; fashion designer
- Years active: 2008–present
- Known for: Yeh Rishta Kya Kehlata Hai (2009–2016); Bigg Boss 10 (2016); Khatmal E Ishq (2017); Mawaan Thandiyan Chawan (2021)
- Spouse: Nisha Rawal (m. 2012; sep. 2021)
- Children: 1

Karan Mehra (born 10 September 1982) is an Indian television actor, model and fashion designer. He is known for his performance as Naitik Singhania, the main lead in Yeh Rishta Kya Kehlata Hai (2009–2016) which is one of the longest-running Indian television serials. He is also known for the role of Sumit Mishra in Khatmal E Ishq (2017). Mehra is one of the highest-paid actors in the Indian television industry and was a contestant in the reality television show Bigg Boss 10 (2016).

== Early life ==
Mehra was born on 10 September 1982 in Jalandhar, Punjab in a Punjabi family. His family moved to Delhi when he was very young. Mehra studied at Apeejay School in Noida and after completing the 12th grade worked as a summer trainee at Dominos Pizza. He then studied fashion designing from the National Institute of Fashion Technology (NIFT), Delhi and was the topper of his batch.

== Career ==
Mehra came to Mumbai and started working for directors Rajkumar Hirani and Ram Gopal Verma as an assistant in four movies. He then appeared in the movie Love Story 2050. After that, he started doing modelling and TV commercials. In 2009, while training in acting classes, he got the role of Naitik Singhania in Yeh Rishta Kya Kehlata Hai. He got a big break from the show, continued it for nearly seven-and-a-half years until June 2016 and quit then owing to health issues. Along with this, he participated in the dance reality shows Nach Baliye 5 and Nach Baliye Shriman v/s Shrimati with his wife Nisha Rawal in 2012–13.

In October 2016, Mehra entered the Bigg Boss house as a contestant with his co-star Rohan Mehra. He was evicted in the fifth week as the first celebrity to be evicted.

He then did a short stint in Khatmal E Ishq (2017) as Sumit Mishra. Mehra's 2018 film Basthi Hai Sasthi is about stepping up game and leaning how to cope with reality. He announced it in an interview, and advertised it on the TV show Saath Nibhana Saathiya in 2016. It was supposed to release in 2017, however release dates were pushed back to 2018.

In October 2020, Mehra started shooting for the 2021 Zee Punjabi soap Mawaan Thandiyan Chawan in Chandigarh. In November 2020, he featured in the Jubin Nautiyal and Rochak Kohli song "Bewafa Tera Masoom Chehra".

== Personal life ==
Mehra was married to actress Nisha Rawal. He saw her on the sets of Hastey Hastey where he was styling. After dating for six years, they married on 24 November 2012. Rawal found out that she was pregnant while he was in the Bigg Boss house. The couple had a son in 2017.

=== Domestic dispute ===
A complaint of domestic violence was filed against Mehra by Rawal on 31 May 2021 in Mumbai's Goregaon police station after the latter arrived with a bleeding forehead. Mehra was subsequently arrested and released on bail. Later, Rawal claimed that Mehra had admitted to an extramarital affair with a Delhi girl while he was away on a shooting in Chandigarh. Divorce has been filed following the event in August 2021, and the couple is separated as of October 2022.

== Filmography ==
=== Films ===
Key
†	Denotes films that have not yet been released

Year	Title	Role	Notes	Ref.
2008	Love Story 2050	Karan's Friend	Bollywood debut	
2013	Bloody Ishq	Doctor		
2018	Basthi Hai Sasthi	Pinder Buppa "Bups"		
2021	Mahina	Adi	Short film; Released on MX Player	

=== Television ===
Year	Name	Role	Channel	Notes	Ref
2009–2016	Yeh Rishta Kya Kehlata Hai	Naitik Singhania	Star Plus	Lead role	
2012	Nach Baliye 5	Contestant	Star Plus	5th place	
2013	Nach Baliye Shriman v/s Shrimati	Contestant	Star Plus	5th place	
2016	Saath Nibhaana Saathiya	Guest	Star Plus	To promote his film	
2016	Bigg Boss 10	Contestant	Colors TV	Evicted, Day 34	
2017	Khatmal E Ishq	Sumit Mishra	Sony SAB	Lead role	
2019	Kitchen Champion	Contestant	Colors TV	Winner	
2019	Ek Bhram...Sarvagun Sampanna	Dr. Ashok Sharma	Star Plus	Cameo	
2020	Shubharambh	Bharat Hasija	Colors TV	Cameo	
2021	Mawaan Thandiyan Chawan	Karan Khurrana	Zee Punjabi	Lead role	
2021	Zee Punjabi Antakshari	Contestant	Zee Punjabi		
2024	Mehndi Wala Ghar	Dr. Manoj "Manu" Agarwal	Sony TV		

=== Music videos ===
Year	Title	Singer(s)	Label	Ref.
2020	"Ek Umeed"	Various artists	Zee Music Company	
2020	"Bewaffa Tera Masoom Chehra"	Jubin Nautiyal	T-Series	
2021	"Ghungroo Toot Gaye"	Javed Ali	Sunshine Music	
2022	"Mulakaatein"	Utkarsh Saxena	Zee Music Company	
2022	"Kachiyaan Kachiyaan"	Jubin Nautiyal	T-Series	
2022	"Rooh-E-Daari"	Altamash Faridi	Rangrezaa Films	
2023	"Tum Toh Aise Na They"	Javed Ali	Rangrezaa Films	
2023	"Hai Aisa Kyun"	Amit Mishra	Gem Tunes	
2023	"Pyar Dobara"	Altamash Faridi	Rangrezaa Films	
2023	"Jawai Tera"	Sony Maan	Gem Tunes Punjabi	

== Awards ==
- ITA Award for Best Actor in a Drama - Popular as Naitik Singhania - Yeh Rishta Kya Kehlata Hai (2009)
- ITA Award for Best Actor in a Drama - Popular as Naitik Singhania - Yeh Rishta Kya Kehlata Hai (2015)
- Gold Award for Best Jodi as Naitik Singhania with Hina Khan - Yeh Rishta Kya Kehlata Hai (2016)
- STAR Parivaar Award for Favourite Pati (lit. 'Favourite Husband', 2015, 2011)

== See also ==
- List of Indian television actors
