= Ruined Heart =

- Film poster
- Pusong Wazak
- Directed by: Khavn
- Written by: Khavn
- Produced by: Stephan Holl; Achinette Villamor
- Starring: Tadanobu Asano; Nathalia Acevedo; Elena Kazan; Paul Andre Puertollano; Vim Nadera
- Cinematography: Christopher Doyle
- Edited by: Carlo Francisco Manatad
- Production companies: Rapid Eye Movies; Kamias Overground
- Distributed by: Stray Dogs
- Release dates: October 2014 (Tokyo International Film Festival); March 26, 2015 (Germany); August 28, 2015 (Philippines)
- Running time: 73 min
- Country: Philippines
- Language: Tagalog

Ruined Heart (Tagalog: Pusong Wazak) is a 2014 Filipino crime drama film directed by Khavn.

== Cast ==
- Tadanobu Asano
- Nathalia Acevedo
- Elena Kazan
- Paul Andre Puertollano
- Vim Nadera
- Khavn

== Reception ==
Ruined Heart premiered in competition at the 27th Tokyo International Film Festival.

Ruined Heart also has a soundtrack via Spotify.
