= Elena Kazan =

German-Russian actress

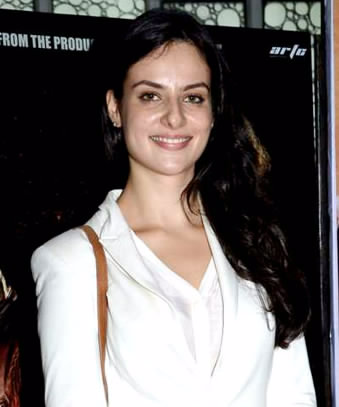
- Born: Moscow, Russia
- Occupation: Actress
- Years active: 2010–2019

Elena Kazan is a German-Russian actress who appears in German as well as Indian films such as Agent Vinod, John Day, Prague etc. The German-Philippine, English film 'Ruined Heart' in which Kazan plays the leading female role was released in March 2015. She has featured as a houseguest in the Bigg Boss house.

== Personal life ==
Kazan was born as Elena Kazan in Moscow, Russia. Her mother is a nurse and her father was a primary school teacher. She spent her childhood in Ukraine before moving to Berlin with her family. At the age of 16, she moved to the US for higher studies. Kazan later went to India to work with a volunteer organization in Kolkata and while there taught the German language at Max Mueller Bhavan. She traveled widely in India for the first three years.

== Career ==
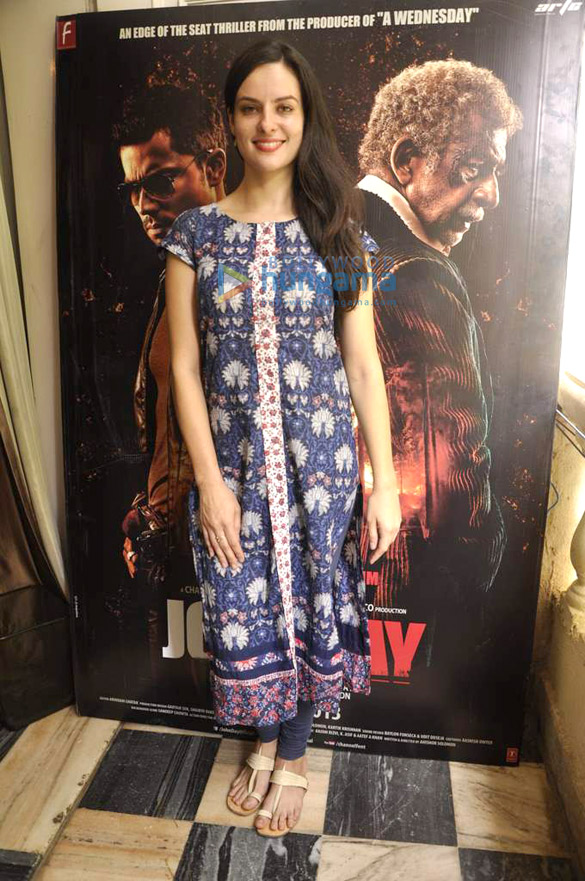
Kazan at the promotions of film 'John Day'

Kazan worked in Kolkata with the Indo-German Chamber of Commerce as an interpreter. She also worked as a Unit Hand in an Australian short film shot in Kolkata, during which time she got the opportunity to work in a Bengali film. Kazan started her acting career with the 2010 Bengali film 'Clerk' opposite Prosenjit Chatterjee. The next year in 2011, Kazan acted in the drama film Gandhi to Hitler. In 2012, Kazan had a cameo role in the film Agent Vinod. But her first big role came in the 2013 film John Day in which she plays the role of Tabassum Habibi, a chronic alcoholic with a dark and complex past. In the same year 2013, Kazan played the role of a Czech gypsy girl in Prague, who comes to India in search of her identity. Her next film was AASMA in which she plays the role of a Kashmiri girl. Her career went international in 2014, when she co-starred in the German-Philippine, English film 'Ruined Heart'.

== Bigg Boss 10 ==
Kazan entered the Colors popular show Bigg Boss 10 as a wild card entrant. She entered along with Jason Shah, Sahil Anand and Priyanka Jagga. She got evicted a week after staying inside the house.

== Filmography ==
Year	Title	Role	Language
2010	Clerk		Bengali
2011	Gandhi to Hitler		Hindi
2011	Rangmilanti	Lisa	Bengali
2011	Egaro		Bengali
2012	Agent Vinod	Tatiana Renko	Hindi
2013	John Day	Tabassum Habibi	Hindi
2013	Prague	Czech gypsi girl	Hindi
2013	Aasma	Kashmiri girl	Hindi
2014	Taan	NGO worker's wife	Bengali
2015	Ruined Heart	Lover	Tagalog
2015	Uvaa	English teacher	Hindi
2017	The Final Exit	Mysterious Woman	Hindi
2017	Devi	Svetlana	Bengali
2018	Mard Ko Dard Nahi Hota	Nandini/Bridget Von Hammersmark	Hindi
2019	Battalion 609	Rukhsana	Hindi
2019	Krishanu! Krishanu!	Klara	Bengali

== Television ==
Year	Show	Role	Note
2016	Bigg Boss 10	Contestant	Entered as Wild Card
