= Karan Mehra (disambiguation) =

Karan Mehra may refer to:

- Karan Mehra (born 10 September 1982), Indian television actor, model and fashion designer
- Karan Veer Mehra (born 28 December 1982), Indian television actor
