= Hip Hip Hurray (TV series) =

Indian youth show

- Genre: Teen drama
- Created by: Nupur Asthana
- Directed by: Nupur Asthana
- Starring: see below
- Opening theme: "Hip Hip Hurray" by Hema Sardesai and KK
- Country of origin: India
- Original language: Hindi
- No. of seasons: 1
- No. of episodes: 80

Production
- Producers: Ronnie Screwvala; Zarina Mehta; Deven Khote
- Running time: 24 minutes
- Production company: UTV Television

Original release
- Network: Zee TV
- Release: 21 October 1998 – 25 May 2001

Hip Hip Hurray is an Indian teen drama series that aired from 21 October 1998 to 25 May 2001 on Zee TV. Produced under the banner of UTV Television, it was created and directed by Nupur Asthana.

== Plot ==
The show focuses on the lives of 12th-grade students at the DeNobili High School and their adventures, their fears and hopes, and their relationships and interactions. The show additionally discusses various issues pertinent to teenagers such as dating, drugs, careers, health, exams and causes, with a balance of drama and humour.

== Cast ==
- Nilanjana Sharma as Mona
- Pamela Mukherjee as Bela
- Rushad Rana as Raghav
- Bhumika Chawla/Preeti Narayan/Nauheed Cyrusi as Meera
- Sharukh Barucha as Cyrus
- Purab Kohli as Mazhar
- Zafar Karachiwalla as Rafey
- Candida Fernandes as Alisha
- Mehul Nisar as Mehul
- Samantha Tremayne as Samantha
- Shweta Salve/Kuljeet Randhawa as Prishita
- Peeya Rai Chowdhary as Kiran
- Yogesh Pagare as Manjeet
- Vishal Malhotra as John
- Kishwer Merchant as Nonie
- Beena Banerjee as Ms. Rodriguez
- Suchitra Pillai as Alaknanda ma'am
- Kenneth Desai as Yadav Sir
- Vinay Pathak as Vincent George (Vinnie Sir)
- Sanjay Mishra as Chandragupta Sir
- Vicky Ahuja as Bhoolu Dada
- Mohan Kapoor as Criminal
- Girish Jain as Avinash
- Jitandra Trehan as Ghanshyam (Retd. Army Officer)
- Dharampal Thakur as Inspector
- Smita Hai as Doctor
- Ankush Mohla as Vishal
- Sulbha Arya as Mrs. Sharma (Hindi teacher)
- Manish Goel as a student
- Utkarsh Mazumdar as Hussain Sir (Chemistry teacher)
- Sheeba Chaddha as Karuna Madam (Biology Teacher)
- Mita Vashisht as L. Bannerjee
- Atul Kumar Mittal Teacher
- Achint Kaur as Maya
- Shabbir Ahluwalia Purab: Prishita's brother
- Ragesh Asthana as Mr. Chowdhary, Kiran's father
- Ruchi Rakhanpal as Mrs. Chowdhary, Kiran's mother
- Shishir Sharma Mr. Joshi, Mona's father
- Anita Kanwal as Mrs. Barucha, Cyrus's mother
- Seema Pahwa as Mrs. Merchant, Mazhar's Mother
- Pavan Malhotra as Mr. Bhatia
- Milind Soman as Himself

== Reception and legacy ==
India Today wrote, "A bunch of 12th grade students dealing with the campus life, their emotions for each other, and their parents. Hip Hip Hurray will always be a favourite. The show had a great young cast, and a very relatable script. It first aired in 1998 on Zee TV, and starred actors like Vinay Pathak, Suchitra Pillai, and Purab Kohli."

In 2017, a remake titled Class of 2017 streamed on ALTBalaji, and it was produced by Ekta Kapoor. The remake got a sequel series Class of 2020, which streamed on the same platform in 2020.
