= Khatmal E Ishq =

- Genre: Sitcom
- Created by: Ashwni Dhir
- Written by: Ashwni Dhir
- Directed by: Anil Dubey Ankush Marode
- Creative director: Dolphy Fernandes
- Country of origin: India
- Original language: Hindi
- No. of seasons: 3
- No. of episodes: 79

Production
- Producers: Ashwni Dhir; Jalaj Dhir
- Editor: Sujit Das
- Camera setup: Multi-camera
- Running time: 22 minutes
- Production company: Garima Productions

Original release
- Network: SAB TV
- Release: 13 December 2016 – 31 March 2017

Khatmal E Ishq is an Indian comedy show produced by Aswini Dheer under the banner of Garima Productions. Khatmal E Ishq...Kaat Lega, the first series of the show premiered on 13 December 2016 on Sony SAB. It starred Vishal Malhotra and Umang Jain. This first series ended on 20 January 2017. Khatmal E Ishq - Biwi Ke Nakhre... Offo is the second series of the show which began airing from 23 January 2017. Third season named Khatmal E Ishq - Do Phool Ek Maali began airing on 8 March 2017.

== Plot ==
Khatmal-E-Ishq is a romantic comedy narrating short stories of ageless love –The love which is beyond imagination & which can change your life forever. When this ishq ka khatmal bites, your life takes an unprecedented romantic turn. This light hearted comedy will introduce multiple lovable characters in multiple heart-warming situations.

== Cast ==
=== Season 1: Khatmal E Ishq... Kaat Lega ===
- Vishal Malhotra as Kapil Dev Dinkar
- Umang Jain as Lovina D'Mello
- Devender Chaudhary as Chacha Chaudhry
- Akhilendra Mishra as Dolphy D'Mello
- Melissa Pais as Nancy D'Mello
- Dhruv Singh as Nancy's husband
- Sulabha Arya as Loveena's grandmother
- Sharat Saxena as Hanuman Singh Dinkar
- Sanjay Mishra as Qawwal appearing in the title song

=== Season 2: Khatmal E Ishq... Biwi Ke Naakhre..Offo !! ===
- Himanshu Soni as Shivam Kumar
- Nikita Sharma as Gauri Shivam Kumar
- Shekhar Shukla as Suresh Gupta, 1st Uncle
- Atul Parchure as Mahesh Gupta, 2nd Uncle
- Prasad Barve as Ramesh Gupta, 3rd Uncle
- Subhashis Chakraborty as Bhole, Servant

=== Season 3: Khatmal E Ishq... Do Phool Ek Maali ===
- Karan Mehra as Sumit Mishra
- Aditi Tailang as Sugandha Mishra (née Sharma)
- Sandeep Sharma as Mohit
- Sheena Bajaj as Mehek (Dance Teacher)
- Mithilesh Chaturvedi as Boss
- Astha Agarwal as Biba
