= Class of 2017 =

2017 Hindi web series by Vikas Gupta

- Genre: Teen drama
- Created by: Vikas Gupta
- Based on: Hip Hip Hurray
- Screenplay by: Pratim Rai; Suyash Vadhavkar; Vidan Farhadi; Dialogues; Gibran Noorani
- Story by: Vikas Gupta; Dipti Kalwani; Suyash Vadhavkar; Pratim Rai
- Directed by: Suyash Vadhavkar
- Creative directors: Pratim Rai; Nimisha Pandey
- Theme music composer: Bharatt-Saurabh
- Composer: Shantanu Dutta
- Country of origin: India
- Original languages: Hindi, English
- No. of seasons: 1
- No. of episodes: 20

Production
- Executive producer: Ankur Dwiwedi
- Production locations: Mumbai, India
- Cinematography: Hanoz.V.K (Bawa)
- Editor: Prashant Panda
- Camera setup: Multi-camera
- Running time: 14-22 minutes
- Production company: Lost Boy Productions Pvt Ltd.

Original release
- Network: ALT Balaji
- Release: 12 July 2017

Class of 2017 is a 2017 Hindi web series created and produced by Vikas Gupta for Ekta Kapoor's video on demand platform ALTBalaji.' The web series revolves around the lives of a few teenagers who get intertwined with drugs, sex, peer pressure and anxiety. The series is loosely based on Hip Hip Hurray. It is mainly available for streaming on the ALT Balaji App and its associated websites since its release date. Its sequel series Class of 2020 started streaming on ALTBalaji from 4 February 2020.

== Plot ==
The series revolves around the lives of a few teenagers who get intertwined with drugs, sex, peer pressure and anxiety. It explores how they crumble and later overcome their teenage problems while learning about life.

== Cast ==
- Anshuman Malhotra as Siddharth
- Krissann Barretto as Sarah
- Rohan Shah as Nikhil
- Adhish Khanna as Shaurya
- Kajol Tyagi as Swati
- Sarah Khatri as Riya
- Pooja Jadhav as Minnie
- Rohit Suchanti as Jai
- Deena Hasan as Amanda
- Jahangir Kakaria as Behzaad (Principal)
- Roopa Ganguly as Frida (Teacher)
- Sikandar Khan as Tiwari (Teacher)
- Rosemary Fernandes as The Bride, Payal Ma'am
- Gaurav Sharma as Amaan
- Ashish Chanchlani as Ishaan

== Episodes ==
- Episode 1: Kavita Ki Kahaani
- Episode 2: Behzaad Ka Aatank
- Episode 3: Baba Ki Booty
- Episode 4: The Younger The Better
- Episode 5: But That's Your Boob!!!
- Episode 6: Magic Pills
- Episode 7: Love Game Begins
- Episode 8: Lap Dance!
- Episode 9: Rose Day
- Episode 10: Humans Need Sex!
- Episode 11: Stop Being Slutty
- Episode 12: Rajma Chawal
- Episode 13: Mystery Man
- Episode 14: Bro's Before Hoe's
- Episode 15: Under My Pants
- Episode 16: Am I An Alien?
- Episode 17: Love is Chu@*#!#pa
- Episode 18: Superman
- Episode 19: Safety Net
- Episode 20: Season Finale: Bon Voyage

== Sequel ==
The sequel series Class of 2020 started released on ALTBalaji from 4 February 2020.
