= Uvaa =

- Directed by: Jasbir Bhatti
- Screenplay by: Dharmendra V. Singh; Shailendra Tiwari; Bhupendra Singh
- Story by: Jasbir Bhatti
- Produced by: Anil D. Jethani; Chandresh D. Jethani
- Starring: Sanjay Mishra; Jimmy Sheirgill; Om Puri; Archana Puran Singh; Sangram Singh
- Cinematography: Digvvijay Singh
- Edited by: Prashant Singh Rathore
- Music by: Original Songs; Rashid Khan; Palash Muchhal
- Production company: Dhanraj Films
- Release date: June 26, 2015
- Running time: 120 minutes
- Country: India
- Language: Hindi

Uvaa (transl. Youth) is a 2015 Indian comedy and social drama film, written and directed by Jasbir Bhatti and produced by Dhanraj Films, about five friends in a boarding school and their daily life suddenly turning into a rebellious fight for justice and making an example for the outside world. The film stars Om Puri, Sanjay Mishra, Vikrant Rai, Jimmy Sheirgill, Sangram Singh, Rohan Mehra, and Archana Puran Singh, and includes several new faces as the lead actors of the film.

== Plot ==
Anil (Rohan Mehra), Vikram (Lavin Gothi), Salmaan (Mohit Baghel) and Deenbandhu (Bhupendra "Megh" Singh) are rebellious brats of suburban Delhi NCR. With the world at their feet and nothing to worry about, they stomp everything in their path without caring about consequences. When the five are placed in the totally new world of convent school, they face new challenge. Their goal is to survive and thrive only to find romance, but one night they encounter a horrifying event which puts them in the hands of law. Their lives change forever as they have to fight for justice and moral integrity to make an example for the world.

== Cast ==
- Om Puri as Hukum Pratap Chaudhary
- Jimmy Sheirgill as S.P Tejaveer Singh
- Manish Chaudhary as Lawyer Pramod Mittal
- Archana Puran Singh as Lawyer Jayshri Bhatiya
- Sangram Singh as Coach Sangram Singh
- Raju Mavani as Divan
- Ravi Verma as a Sub-inspector
- Rohan Mehra as Anil Sharma
- Mohit Baghel as Salman Khan
- Poonam Pandey as Pooja
- Sheena Bajaj as Rashmi
- Neha Khan as Mala
- Rajit Kapoor as Principal
- Elena Kazan as English Teacher Kanaklata
- Sanjay Mishra as Hindi Teacher Vyakulji
- Jyoti Kalash as Jailor
- Vinti Idnani as Nisha
- Yukti Kapoor as Roshni
- Jeetu Shivhare as Drama Teacher Sala Sir
- Shefali Singh as Yoga Teacher
- Gautam Gilhotra as Music Teacher
- Parikshit Sahni as Judge
- Amisha Ghai as Jyoti
- Vicky Aahuja as Shrikant Tyagi
- Padam Singh as Girish Sharma
- Lavin Gothi as Vikram Tyagi
- Vicky Roy as Ram Pratap Singh
- Bhupendra "Megh" Singh as Deenbandhu

== Soundtrack ==
Uvaa

Soundtrack album by Manoj, Rashid Khan, Praveen & Palash Muchhal
- Released: 2 June 2015
- Genre: Feature film soundtrack
- Length: 25:34
- Language: Hindi
- Label: Zee Music Company
External audio
- Audio Jukebox on YouTube

The music for Uvaa has been composed by Rashid Khan, Palash Muchal & Praveen-Manoj. The lyrics have been given by Bhupendra Singh Megh and Shiv Singh.

No.	Title	Lyrics	Music	Singer(s)	Length
1.	"Jiyo Lalla"	Bhupendra Singh	Praveen Bhardwaj & Manoj	Jasraj Joshi	05:31
2.	"Ishq Fobiya"	Bhupendra Singh	Rashid Khan	Mohammed Irfan, Bhanu Pratap Singh	05:55
3.	"Vande Mataram"			Siddharth Mahadevan, Sujata Mazumdar, Poonam Pandey 1
4.	"Natani"	Bhupendra Singh, Shiv	Palash Muchhal	Sujata Mazumdar, Amit Mishra, Poonam Pandey 1 & Shiv Singh	03:40
5.	"Ishq Fobiya Kyun"	Bhupendra Singh	Rashid Khan	Mohammed Irfan & Palak Muchhal	05:55
Total length:					25:34

== Critical response ==
Renuka Vyavahare of The Times of India said that, "Uvaa (read youngsters) is one of those many films which touches upon a relevant topic but fails to capitalise on its potential." The critic gave the film a rating of 2 out of 5 and concluded her review saying that, "shoddy execution mars this potentially significant social drama." Shaheen Parkar of Mid-Day gave the film a rating of 1.5 out of 5 and said that, "there’s nothing in the storyboard that enthralls you even for a few minutes." Martin D'Souza of Glamsham gave the film a rating of 2 out of 5 saying that, "If only director Jasbir Bhatti had dwelt on the subject rather than concentrating on silly school scenes and even sillier teachers, we would have had a hard-hitting film on our hands." Bollywood Life gave the film a rating of 1 out of 5 saying that, "Overall, the film is a poor attempt at driving home a relevant social message. A perfect case of good intention, bad execution."
