= Nathalia Acevedo =

Mexican actress

- Born: Nathalia Acevedo; November 22, 1984 (age 41); Mexico City, Mexico
- Occupation: Actress
- Years active: 2012–present
- Height: 5 ft 9.75 in (177 cm)

Nathalia Acevedo (born November 22, 1984) is a Mexican actress best known for her acting debut in Carlos Reygadas's Post Tenebras Lux which premiered in competition at the 2012 Cannes Film Festival and won for Reygadas the Best Director Award. Her most notable roles since include starring alongside Tadanobu Asano in Filipino cult director Khavn De La Cruz’s Ruined Heart in 2014 (shot by Christopher Doyle and premiering at the Tokyo Film Festival 2014) and starring in Illum Jacobi's The Trouble with Nature.

== Filmography ==
- Post Tenebras Lux (2012)
- Ruined Heart (2014)
- Princesita (2018)
- The Trouble with Nature (2020)
