= The Final Exit =

- Directed by: Dhwanil Mehta
- Written by: Dhwanil Mehta
- Produced by: Mrunal Jhaveri; Vishal Rana
- Starring: Kunaal Roy Kapur; Archana Shastry; Elena Kazan; Reyhna Malhotra; Scarlett Wilson; Ananya Sengupta
- Cinematography: Ajay Pandey
- Edited by: Hardik Singh
- Music by: Songs; Aman Pant; Yashraj-Ajay; Background Score; Shantanu Sudame
- Production company: Mars Entertainment
- Distributed by: Carnival Motion Pictures
- Release date: 22 September 2017
- Running time: 119 minutes
- Country: India
- Language: Hindi

The Final Exit is a 2017 Indian Hindi supernatural horror film. It is directed by Dhwanil Mehta and produced by Vishal Rana & Mrunal Jhaveri. It stars Kunaal Roy Kapur, Archana Shastry, Elena Kazan, Reyhna Malhotra and Scarlett Wilson.

The film was released on 22 September 2017.

== Cast ==
- Kunaal Roy Kapur as Vidyut
- Archana Shastry
- Elena Kazan
- Reyhna Malhotra
- Scarlett Wilson
- Ananya Sengupta as Mysterious Woman
- Divya Agarwal
- Mukesh Hariawala as Khurana

== Plot ==
It is the story of a guy who begins to hallucinate and is seeing things which are not for real. Things get worst when he tries to shoot those things through his camera.

== Soundtrack ==
The Final Exit

Soundtrack album by Amjad Nadeem, Yashraj - Ajay, Aman Pant & Ankit Semal
- Released: 29 September 2017
- Genre: Feature film soundtrack
- Length: 15:17
- Language: Hindi
- Label: Zee Music Company
External audio
- Audio Jukebox on YouTube

Tracklist
No.	Title	Lyrics	Music	Singer(s)	Length
1.	"Dum Maro Dum Maro"	Amjad Nadeem (Rap Lyrics: Raftaar)	Amjad Nadeem	Neha Kakkar, Raftaar & Yasser Desai	03:33
2.	"Ye Lamha"	Yuvraj-Akanksha	Yashraj-Ajay	Shaan	04:19
3.	"Tandav"	Traditional	Aman Pant	Nirmalya Roy, Deepti Sharma & Aman Pant	03:18
4.	"Darr Jo Jayega"	Abhishek Singh	Ankit Semal & Yashraj-Ajay	Yasser Desai & Shivangi Bhayana	04:01
Total length:					15:17

== Critical reception ==
Reza Noorani of The Times of India gave the film a rating of 3 out of 5 saying that, "While the philosophical turn the film takes is interesting, it’s a tad too metaphysical. A different kind of horror, go for this one if you’re interested in a good dose of philosophy with your horror." Vishal Verma of Glamsham praised the concept, cinematography, background music by Shantanu Sudame and the acting performances of actors Kunaal Roy Kapur and debutant Ananya Sengupta and said that, "THE FINAL EXIT is a mind twister for the common audience and it requires an extra understanding of the other aspect of evil." The critic gave the film a rating of 3 out of 5.
