= Ultraviolins =

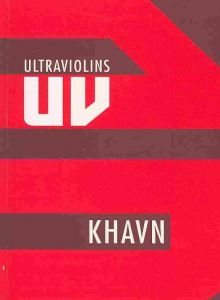
- The cover of Khavn's Ultraviolins
- Author: Khavn
- Language: English, Tagalog
- Genre: Short story
- Publisher: University of the Philippines Press, University of Hawaii Press
- Publication date: August 18, 2008
- Media type: Print (hardback & paperback)
- Pages: 214
- ISBN: 978-971542574-2
- OCLC: 262737716
- LC Class: MLCM 2008/00864 (P)
- Preceded by: Lines on the Sole (2008)
- Followed by: Philippine New Wave: This Is Not A Film Movement (2010)
- Ultraviolins on Open Library at the Internet Archive

Ultraviolins is a collection of 14 short stories by Khavn, first published by the University of the Philippines Press in 2008 and subsequently by the University of Hawaii Press in 2009. It is his first book of fiction.

On the book's cover, National Artist for Literature Bienvenido Lumbera cautions the reader to "Accept that the author in front of you is consciously being insane so you don't have to go looking for anything as boring as sanity."

== Description ==
Ultraviolins is a compendium of stories. "Story", in this sense, is a word used loosely to describe a form that looks like one. However, the forms shapeshift wildly without relaxing into anything resembling a conventional storyform: synopsized movie scripts leeched of film language so it's easier to read, flash fiction, or even creative non-fiction that resembles a confessional essay. The shape of the narrative is highly stylized, prompting the label "postmodern story".

== The stories ==
1. "adulturero / the adulterous man "

Translated by Pearlsha Abubakar

2. "amerika"

Translated by Carljoe Javier

3. "ang bahista / the bassist"

Translated by Daryll Jane Delgado

4. "k. ang bagong katipunan | k. the new brotherhood"

Translated by Juaniyo Arcellana

5. "dedbol / deadball"

Translated by Daryl A. Valenzuela

6. "ang ipis sa loob ng basurahan / the cockroach inside the trashcan"

Translated by Dean Francis Alfar

7. "isang gabi / one night"

Translated by Francezca Kwe

8. "ang nangyari sa adarna pagkatapos ng kanta / after the adarna's song"

Translated by Cyan Abad-Jugo

9. "nokturno / nocturne"

Translated by Sarge Lacuesta

10. "ang pamilyang kumakain ng lupa / the family that eats soil"

Translated by Mayo Uno Martin

11. "ang rapist sa loob ng puso ko / the rapist inside my heart"

Translated by Zosimo Quibilan Jr.

12. "sm: mga lamang-isip ng isang maswerteng serial killer at ng mga malas niyang biktima / sm: the hidden thoughts of a lucky serial killer and his luckless victims"

Translated by Karl R. De Mesa

13. "tanaga sa ateneo / tanaga in the ateneo"

Translated by Noel del Prado

14. "ang tao bilang makakalimutin / man as forgetful"

Translated by Erwin Romulo

== Style ==
Ultraviolins is considered the first Filipino post-modern book of short stories. Postmodern storytelling has been appropriated before, but not as a collection of short stories and some not even published yet. Works of note include Roland Tolentino's Microfiction, Mykel Andrada's Rizal In Dapitan, Allan Derain's Iskrapbuk, Eros Atalia's Suicide Manual, Norman Wilwayco's How I Fixed My Hair After A Rather Long Journey, Edgar Samar's Eight Spirits Of The Fall, and Mes de Guzman's Rancho Dyango.

Khavn is generally better known as an experimental digital filmmaker, and this aesthetic: the manufactured reality, the editing techniques, the self-referentiality, the pungent prose, the grimy imagery — even down to how Khavn cuts his lines — is found in Ultraviolins.

"Amerika" is an angry and self-conscious contemplation of the meaning of Amerika, initially reminiscent of Allen Ginsberg's long-form piece of basically the same name, although Ginsberg's anger is met with sarcasm in Khavn's story. "Dedbol" is a series of disjointed dagli about random people — a serial killer, some kidnappers, a four-piece band, and girls on a shower party — converging for a split second in the Divine Intersection before splitting up again to conclude their narratives, borrowing Guillermo Arriaga’s narrative conceit from the seminal McOndo movie Amores perros, only lacking the social and political implications of the original. "Ang Ipis Sa Loob ng Basurahan" is a post-Kafka humanized depiction of a cockroach stuck inside a trash can deciding to build a home for itself in the interim before its expected escape and sudden death by way of slipper-squashing.

== Reviews and analysis ==
F. Sionil Jose, National Artist for Literature, calls the book "refreshingly original, irreverent, even kinky - a spicy read on any humdrum day."

The Varsitarian, however, commends Ultraviolins as "a raw but genuine attempt to break through the normal conventions of short stories and poems and acts as a fluent introduction to comical postmodernism."

== Film adaptation ==
One of the stories in Ultraviolins, "The Family That Eats Soil", was first published in 2005 as part of the Philippine Speculative Fiction Sampler. Cory Doctorow of Boing Boing calls the anthology of stories "pretty fascinating and often good", singling out "The Family That Eats Soil" as an example.

The Family That Eats Soil tells the story of a family who eat soil three times a day. It premiered at the 34th International Film Festival Rotterdam in 2005. The Village Voice criticized it as a "brown comedy" and a "fast-forward favorite at the festival's video library". However, critic Alexis Tioseco praised the film as a highly political "dystopian view of the modern Filipino family. The repetitive chorus of the film that breaks up the separate stories of the individual family members is the image of a family meal, eating soil."
