= Khavn De La Cruz =

Filipino filmmaker (born 1973)

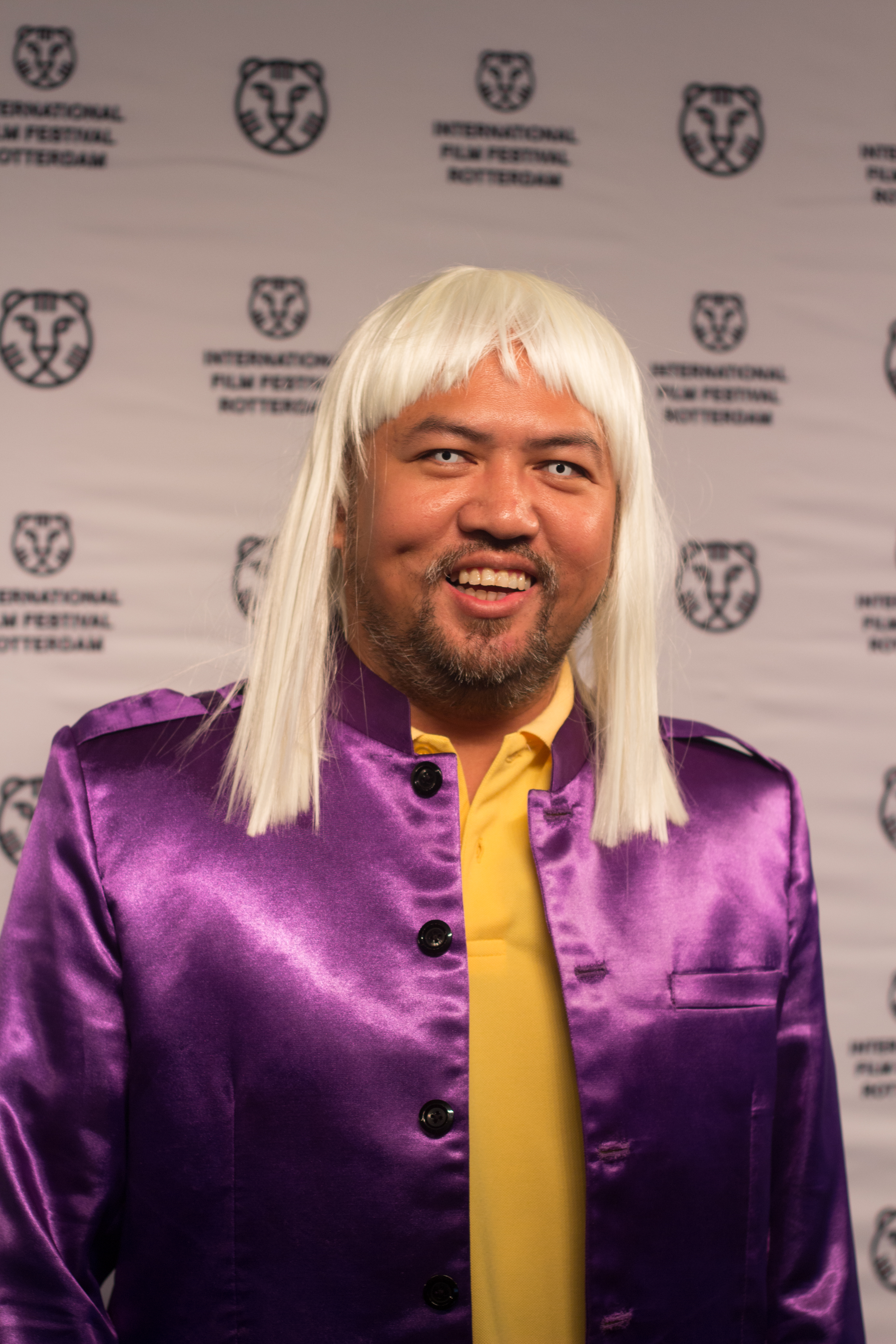
- Khavn at the 2015 International Film Festival Rotterdam
- Born: December 23, 1973 (age 52); Quezon City, Philippines
- Education: Ateneo de Manila University
- Occupations: Filmmaker, singer, songwriter, pianist, poet
- Website: http://khavn.tv/

Khavn De La Cruz (also known as KHAVN) is a Filipino singer, songwriter, pianist, filmmaker,, novelist, and poet. He is the founder and festival director of the MOV International Film, Music and Literature Festival. Considered the father of Philippine digital filmmaking, Khavn has made 47 features and 112 short films since 1994. His 46th feature, Ruined Heart, was lensed by Christopher Doyle and features Tadanobu Asano and Nathalia Acevedo. It premiered in official competition at the 27th Tokyo International Film Festival.

== Works ==
- Ultraviolins, a collection of 14 short stories (2008)
- Antimarcos, an anti-novel in Filipino (published 2024), winner of the 2022 Carlos Palanca Memorial Awards for Literature Grand Prize for the Nobela
