= Nisha Rawal =

Indian actress (born 1980)

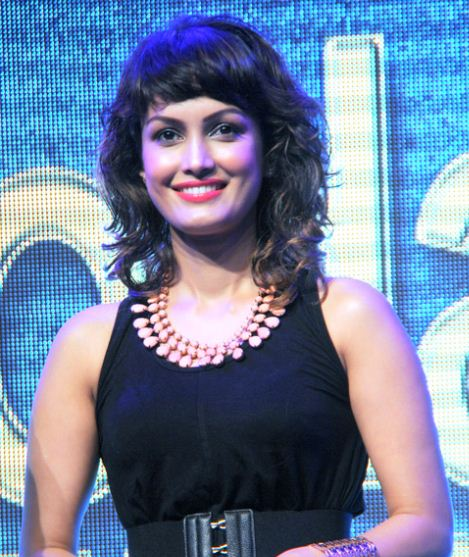
- Rawal in 2017
- Born: 18 November 1980 (age 46)
- Occupation: Actress
- Years active: 2000-present
- Spouse: Karan Mehra (m. 2012; div. 2021)
- Children: 1

Nisha Rawal (born 18 November 1980) is an Indian actress, known for her role in television show Main Lakshmi Tere Aangan Ki (2011-2012).

== Career ==
Before getting into acting, Rawal appeared in advertisements for Sunsilk, Coca-Cola and Fem Bleech. She also appeared in music videos. She made her debut in Bollywood with Raffo Chakkar and Hastey Hastey. She made her television debut with Aane Wala Pal on Doordarshan. She also worked in theatre where she featured in two different plays – Poore Chand Ki Raat and Ichha. She also participated in the dance reality show Nach Baliye 5 with Karan Mehra. She released her cover of "Ae Dil Hain Mushkil" as a surprise for her husband on occasion of their 5th wedding anniversary.

== Personal life ==
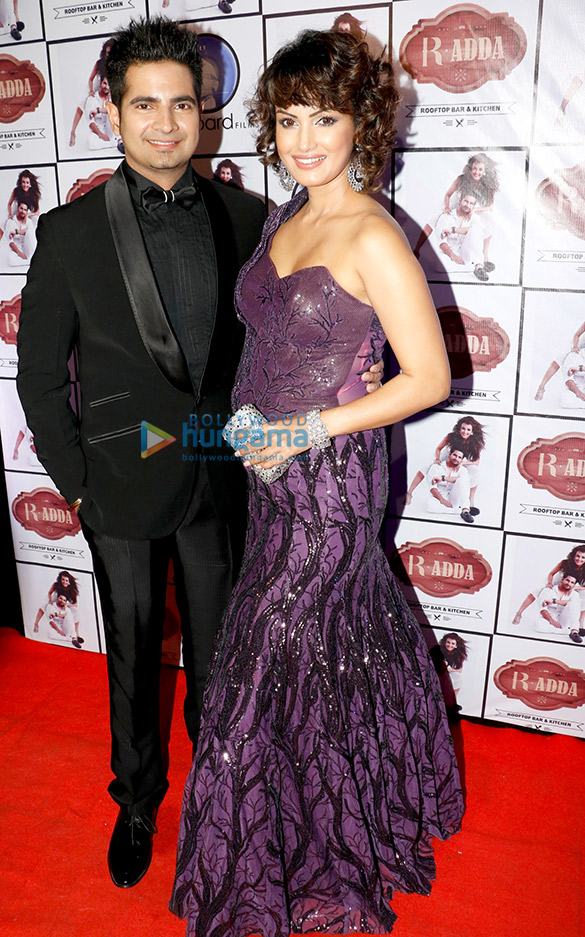
Nisha with her ex-husband Karan Mehra

Rawal was born on 18 November 1980. On 24 November 2012 she married TV actor Karan Mehra. In 2017, Nisha gave birth to a boy.

=== Domestic dispute ===
A complaint of domestic violence was filed against Mehra by Rawal on 31 May 2021 in Mumbai's Goregaon police station after the latter arrived with a bleeding forehead. Mehra was subsequently arrested and released on bail. Later, Rawal claimed that Mehra had admitted to an extramarital affair with a Delhi girl while he was away on a shooting in Chandigarh. Divorce has been filed following the event, and the couple is separated as of March 2022.

== Filmography ==
=== Television ===
Year	Serial	Role	Notes
2001	Aane Wala Pal	Unnamed	
2002	Kesar	Binita	
2011–2012	Main Lakshmi Tere Aangan Ki	Soumya Diwan	
2012-2013	Nach Baliye 5	Contestant	5th place
2013	Nach Baliye Shriman v/s Shrimati	Contestant	
2020–2021	Shaadi Mubarak	Chanda Rathore	
2021–2022; 2023	Meet: Badlegi Duniya Ki Reet	Masoom Ahlawat	
2022	Lock Upp	Contestant	13th place

=== Films ===
Year	Film	Role	Notes
2008	Rafoo Chakkar	Milli	
2008	Hastey Hastey	Maya Fernandez	
2009	Tom, Dick, and Harry: Rock Again...	Soniaa	Unreleased
2010	Jack N Jhol	Simran	
