= John Day (film) =

- Theatrical release poster
- Directed by: Ahishor Solomon
- Written by: Ahishor Solomon; Kartik Krishnan (dialogue)
- Produced by: Anjum Rizvi; Aatif Khan; K. Asif
- Starring: Naseeruddin Shah; Randeep Hooda; Vipin Sharma; Shernaz Patel; Sharat Saxena; Elena Kazan
- Cinematography: Prakash Kutty
- Edited by: Arindam Ghatak
- Music by: Sandeep Chowta; Strings; Kshitij Tarey
- Release date: 13 September 2013; (India)
- Running time: 138 minutes
- Country: India
- Language: Hindi

John Day is a 2013 Indian Hindi-language action thriller film written and directed by Ahishor Solomon. The film stars Naseeruddin Shah, Randeep Hooda, Elena Kazan, Vipin Sharma, and Shernaz Patel. It is an unofficial remake of the Spanish thriller Box 507.

== Plot ==
John Day is a bank manager at Royal Citizen Co-operative Bank and lives with his wife Maria Day. The couple has recently lost their only daughter Pearl in a forest fire while she was on a trip with her boyfriend Kanishk. Maria is always depressed and never opens up with anyone. One day, when John is away for office work, a courier-boy enters the house and takes Maria as a captive. He then calls up John, informing him about his wife is a hostage, and tells him that a man will visit him at his bank and John has to do his work. It is shown that actually, it was a planned bank heist where the visitor gagged John, opened up the cash locker, and fled. Meanwhile, the kidnapper hammered Maria, causing her serious brain damage, and she got admitted to the hospital in a state of coma.

The news spread on all TV channels. An impatient and short tempered Police Officer, Gautam, is shocked and calls his girlfriend Tabassum to collect a very important document stored in a locker of the bank. Inside the bank, the bank authorities, in the presence of the police, are giving away claims to bank customers, when Tabassum approaches and claims her documents which are revealed to be some property papers called "CASABLANCA ESTATES". This surprises John Day, and he follows the duo in his car and observes them depositing the file in a government property office. John bribes the office personnel and procures the original Casablanca files, and investigates.

During his investigation, he learns that police Officer Gautam also seeks the files and wants to sell them to a Mafia-based organization in Dubai. Gautam is under pressure from the Mafia to hand over the original documents of "Casablanca Estates". John vows to take revenge on the people who have injured his wife and actually eliminates all the informants, including the kidnapper, the bank robbers and others involved. He then takes Tabassum as a captive and calls Gautam, and another powerful Mafia Khan Saab at Gautam's place, and there, the truth is revealed.

Casablanca estate is nothing but 8000 acres of forest land being acquired illegally on papers by Mafia Lord Khan Saab and Dubai based Al Hunain, along with the help of Police Officer Gautam, who works for Khan. They had acquired the land, registered it with the insurance company, and then set fire to the jungle in order to get heavy compensation. It was revealed that on that fateful day, when the fire erupted, John Day's daughter Pearl was there for a jungle trip and perished in the same while her boyfriend escaped unhurt.

Meanwhile, Gautam has a plan to sell the papers for 50 Crores to the Dubai-based AG group and settle with his girlfriend abroad. When Khan is about to shoot Gautam for his treachery, Tabassum opens fire to save him. An ensuing shootout occurs in the room and results in Tabassum being killed, Khan and his associates, badly wounded and finally, Gautam being shot multiple times by John. John then shoots Khan Saab too. Later he is shown weeping at the graves of his daughter and wife. The film ends with a Biblical quote by Mark "For what will it profit a man if he gains the whole world, and loses his own soul? (Mark 8:36).

== Cast ==
- Naseeruddin Shah as John Day
- Randeep Hooda as Gautam
- Elena Kazan as Tabassum Habibi
- Shernaz Patel as Maria Day
- Sharat Saxena as Sikander Hayat Khan
- Vipin Sharma as Inspector Mangesh Shinde
- Makarand Deshpande as Krishnan
- Kenneth Desai as Prakash Nair
- Pramod Pathak as Vikrant Ghosh
- Dinesh Lamba as Liyaqat
- Deepak Shirke as Wagle
- Anant Mahadevan as John Day's friend
- Denzil Smith as Priest

== Soundtrack ==
No.	Title	Lyrics	Music	Singer(s)	Length
1.	"Charon Taraf"	Anwar Maqsood	Strings	Strings	4:58
2.	"Kis Lamhe Mein" (Female Version)	Sayeed Quadri	Kshitij Karey	Aditi Singh Sharma	4:26
3.	"Kis Lamhe Mein" (Male Version)	Sayeed Quadri	Kshitij Karey	Kshitij Karey	4:26
