= Rohan Mehra (born 1990) =

Indian model and actor (born 1990)

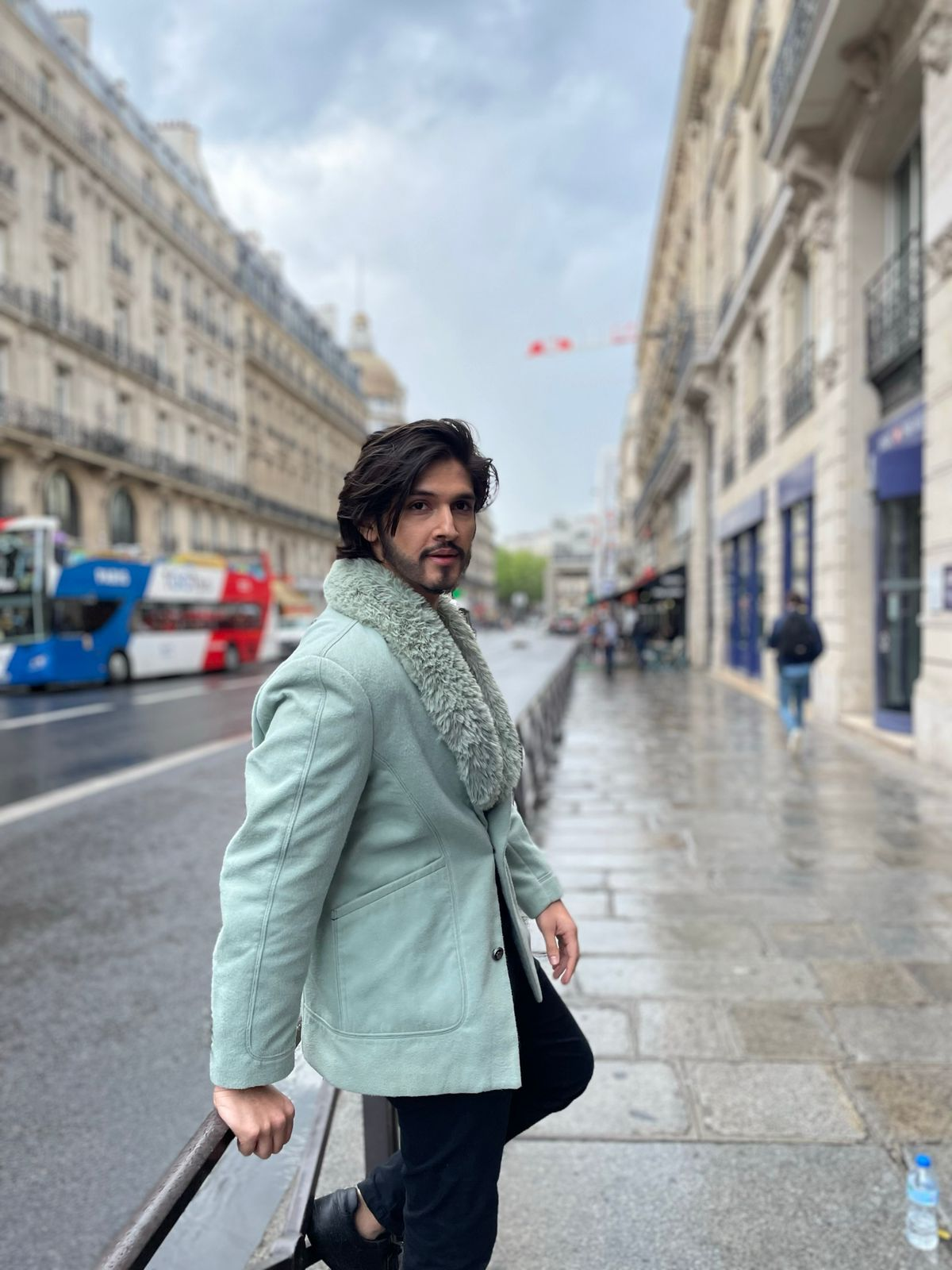
- Born: 8 April 1990 (age 36); Amritsar, Punjab, India
- Education: Hansraj College; Delhi University
- Occupations: Actor; model
- Years active: 2009–present
- Known for: Yeh Rishta Kya Kehlata Hai; Bigg Boss 10; Sasural Simar Ka
- Height: 5 ft 11 in (1.80 m)
- Parents: Ravindra Mehra (father); Rashmi Mehra (mother)
- Relatives: Siddharth Mehra (brother); Ritika Mehra (sister)

Rohan Mehra is an Indian actor who works in films, web series, music videos, advertisements, and television. He is best known for portraying Naksh Singhania in Yeh Rishta Kya Kehlata Hai and Sameer Kapoor in Sasural Simar Ka. He was also a finalist on the reality television show Bigg Boss 10. Mehra has appeared in films such as Sixteen, Uvaa, and Khalli Balli. In addition to his acting career in film and television, he has featured in more than 70 music videos alongside actors including Jannat Zubair, Adah Sharma, Avneet Kaur, and Mahima Makwana. He has also worked in web series such as Class of 2020, Crashh, and Pyramid, gaining recognition in the digital entertainment space. Mehra is also known for his work in advertising, having appeared in over 300 television commercials and print campaigns. He completed filming for Chaos, a feature film co-starring Sanjay Dutt and Gulshan Grover, which is expected to be released in 2026.He just just wrapped shooting for another film Tera Sai, featuring Sanjay Mishra as Sai Baba in which he is playing one of the leads. Coming to theatres on 5th February 2027

== Career ==
=== Initial career days (2009–15) ===
Mehra began his acting career in an episode of Channel V India's crime drama Gumrah: End of Innocence in 2012.

In 2013, he appeared as Varun Ashwin Khanna in Sony Entertainment Television's TV show Bade Achhe Lagte Hain. Mehra also made his Bollywood debut as Kartik in the film Sixteen.

In 2014, he appeared in two episodes in Yeh Hai Aashiqui and Webbed 2. His second Bollywood film Uvaa was released in 2015.

=== Breakthrough and Bigg Boss (2015–17) ===
In 2015, Mehra portrayed Naksh Singhania in Star Plus's longest-running soap opera Yeh Rishta Kya Kehlata Hai, which won him the Gold Award for Best Debut Actor (Male). He left the show in September 2016 to participate in Bigg Boss.

In October 2016, he entered as a celebrity contestant in the 10th season. He was eliminated on Day 102 in January 2017 and placed 5th.

=== Sasural Simar Ka and beyond (2017–present) ===
From June 2017 to March 2018, Mehra starred in Colors TV's long running daily soap Sasural Simar Ka as Sameer Kapoor opposite Krissann Barretto and Vaishali Takkar. His character was initially negative, before it slowly turned positive.

In 2018, portrayed Rohan in &TV's Laal Ishq. The same year, he playing on the Lucknow Nawabs team in the third season of Box Cricket League and won the trophy.

A year later, Mehra was a contestant in Kitchen Champion with Kanchi Singh. In 2020, he starred in the teen drama web series Class of 2020 on ALTBalaji.

In February 2021, his second web series Crashh began streaming online on ALTBalaji and ZEE5, co-starring Zain Imam and Anushka Sen.

== Filmography ==
Television

Year	Title	Role	Notes	Ref.
2012	Gumrah: End of Innocence	Aarav		
2013	Bade Achhe Lagte Hain	Varun Khanna		
2014	Yeh Hai Aashiqui	Amar		
2014	Webbed 2	Ravi		
2015–16	Yeh Rishta Kya Kehlata Hai	Naksh Singhania	Son of Akshara Naitik Singhania	
2016–17	Bigg Boss 10	Contestant	5th place	
2017–18	Sasural Simar Ka	Sameer Kapoor		
2018	Laal Ishq	Rohan	Episodic	
2019	Kitchen Champion	Himself	Guest	
2019	Ace Of Space 2	Himself	Guest	

=== Web series ===
Year	Title	Role	Ref.
2020	Class of 2020	Ibrahim Noorani	
2021	Crashh	Rahim Ansari	
2024	Pyramid	Mohit	

=== Music videos ===
Year	Title	Singer(s)	Ref.
2018	Tu Meri Zindagi	Keshav Kumar	
2019	On My Way	Aakanksha Sharma, Harry	
2019	Dhadkane Meri	Asees Kaur, Yasser Desai	
2019	Tarse Ye Naina	Anand Bajai	
2019	Ishq Farzi	Jannat Zubair Rahmani	
2019	Darwaze Bandh	Harry, Enbee	
2019	Itni Si Kahani	Asees Kaur, Shivang Mathur, Abhijeet Srivastava	
2020	Qafile Noor Ke	Yasser Desai	
2020	Teri Baatein Mulaqatein	Raj Barman, Ahana Chakraborty	
2020	Badi Aasani Se	Danish Alfaaz	
2020	Gustakhiyan	Ritrisha Samrah, Raghav Chaitanya	
2020	Inna Pyaar	Aishwarya Pandit	
2020	Teri Baat Aur Hai	Stebin Ben	
2020	Main Hoon Tera	Piyush Shankar	
2020	Mera Baalam	Nitin Gupta	
2021	Kinne Saalan Baad	Goldie Sohel	
2021	Zara Thehro	Altamash Faridi	
2021	Leja Leja Re Mahi	Stebin Ben	
2021	Sorry Sorry	Raashi Sood	
2021	Aadat	Ishaan Khan	
2022	Roka Roka	Zublee Baruah	
2022	Khushamadeed	Javed Ali, Priya Bhui	
2022	Aakad	Simar Sethi	
2022	Dil Puchta Hai	Palak Muchhal	
2022	Sorry	Raman Romana	
2022	Aadi Aadi	Dhvani Bhanushali, Mellow D	
2025	Dil Na Lageya Ve	Kishore Mondal	

== Awards and nominations ==
Year	Award	Category	Work	Result	Ref.
2016	Gold Awards	Best Debut Actor (Male)	Yeh Rishta Kya Kehlata Hai	Won	
2016	Star Parivaar Awards	Best Naya Sadasya (Male)	Yeh Rishta Kya Kehlata Hai	Won	
2021	Iconic Gold Awards	Iconic Youth Icon of the Year	Himself	Won	
