= Indo-German Chamber of Commerce =

Indo-German Chamber of Commerce Logo (Updated in 2021)

The Indo-German Chamber of Commerce (IGCC) is the largest German bi-national Chamber abroad and the largest Chamber of Commerce in India. It acts as primary contact for Indian and German companies who are willing to establish a business in the other country. It works in close cooperation with the Chambers of Industry and Commerce in Germany (IHKs) and the Association of German Chambers of Industry and Commerce (DIHK).

== History ==
The Indo-German Chamber of Commerce was established and incorporated in the year 1956.

== Membership ==
The Indo-German Chamber of Commerce cooperates with the German Chambers of Industry and Commerce (IHK) as well as with the Association of German Chambers of Industry and Commerce (DIHK). Members can be organizations and individuals of any nationality. The Indo-German Chamber of Commerce has over 4500 members. They enjoy benefits like attending events, networking, interacting with peers and industry leaders, staying updated on economic and policy changes relevant to your business, and many more.

== Direction ==
The current Director-General of the Indo-German Chamber of Commerce is Mr. Jan Noether.

== Services ==
DEinternational is the service arm of the Indo-German Chamber of Commerce. The various services provided by IGCC are as follows:

1. Market entry support.
2. Webinars
3. Marketing
4. Business Delegation
5. Translation
6. Legal services
7. Vocational Training Consultation
8. Development cooperation
9. Sustain Markets

== Representations ==
The Indo-German Chamber of Commerce has representations in India and Germany. In India, IGCC is present at 6 locations. Headquartered in Mumbai, IGCC’s branch offices are located in Delhi, Chennai, Pune, Kolkata, Bangalore. The German subsidiary is located in Düsseldorf.

== Training ==
The German-Dual system is one of the cornerstones of the ‘Made in Germany’ brand, now widely adopted by many European and Asian economies for quality and excellence. To enable this service to member companies in India and provide them with a common management training platform, Indo-German Training Centre (IGTC) and the German Dual Vocational Education and Training system (VET, DualPro, ProRecognition) have been setup.

== Events ==
IGCC uses its business and corporate experiences to help member companies organize their Business meetings, Seminars, theme related Workshops, Office Opening, Product Launches, Conferences, Business Dinner Receptions, etc.

Such events can be organized by IGCC offices at Mumbai, Delhi, Pune, Bangalore, Chennai and Kolkata.

== Trade Fairs ==
Trade fairs are a platform to promote your products and services globally and launch them into new markets. IGCC aims to identify and participate in leading trade exhibitions in Germany and India.

== Business Opportunities ==
IGCC’s online market is a platform for Indian and German member companies to post their requirements for business partners and to view enquiries from other IGCC members, and connect on potential opportunities.

== Jobs and Careers ==
One can explore IGCC's online job market for job opportunities, internships and legal clerkships in Indian and German companies, as well as at the Indo-German Chamber of Commerce.

== Internships ==
The Indo-German Chamber of Commerce or the Deutsch-Indische Handelskammer offers German students enrolled in a University, a four-to-six-month internship in their offices in Mumbai, Delhi, Bangalore or Pune.

Interns are involved in different aspects of Indo-German business and gain work experience in an intercultural and global set-up in India.

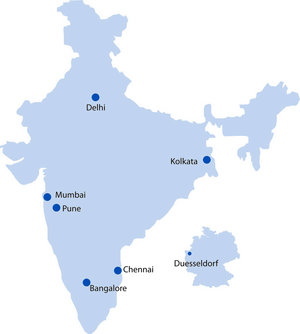
IGCC-Locations
