= Hastey Hastey =

Hastey-Hastey
- Directed by: Ramanjit "Tony" Juneja
- Written by: Rohit Batra
- Produced by: Go Cam Films; Inox
- Starring: Jimmy Sheirgill; Rajpal Yadav; Nisha Rawal; Monishka
- Music by: Anu Malik
- Release date: 30 May 2008
- Running time: 127 minutes
- Country: India
- Language: Hindi

Hastey Hastey is a 2008 Hindi romantic comedy film starring, Rajpal Yadav, newcomers Nisha Rawal and Monishka. It is directed by Ramanjit "Tony" Juneja and produced by Go Cam Films in association with Inox.

== Cast ==
- Jimmy Sheirgill as Neel Vikas Anand
- Rajpal Yadav as Sunny Malhotra, Raj and Jai.
- Nisha Rawal as Maya Fernandez
- Monishka as Tanvi
- Jawed Sheikh as Maya's dad
- Manoj Joshi as Officer
- Shakti Kapoor as Tony

== Music ==
1. "Bheegi Bheegi Teri Julfein" - Kunal Ganjawala
2. "Almadad Chere Khuda" - Zubeen Garg
3. "Hastey Hastey" (happy) - Sunidhi Chauhan, Shiv Ram Kumar
4. "Hastey Hastey" (sad) - Shiv Ram Kumar, Sunidhi Chauhan
5. "Hum Hai Tum Ho" - Sunidhi Chauhan
6. "New Age Mantra" - Sunidhi Chauhan, Kunal Ganjawala
7. "New Age Mantra" (2) - Sunidhi Chauhan
8. "New Age Mantra" (Male) - Kunal Ganjawala
9. "Rock The World" - Sunidhi Chauhan, Shaan
10. "Rock The World" (Female) - Sunidhi Chauhan
11. "Rock The World" (Male) - Shaan

== Reception ==
Taran Adarsh of Bollywood Hungama gave the film 1 out of 5, writing, "The reason why a majority of films go unnoticed is courtesy the weak storyline first. The other factors come later. HASTEY HASTEY - FOLLOW YOUR HEART also suffers for this reason. The story idea, credited to one Rohit Batra, is so tacky, so banal, so obsolete, so lifeless that you break into a big yawn 10 minutes into the film. Seriously, you actually pinch yourself. Are you watching a film produced in 2008? Clearly, the writer is the villain here. " Shubhra Gupta of The Indian Express wrote "In Hastey Hastey, he [Sheirgill] is a student at Columbia, NY, looking way too old. He romances a girl who doesn't seem to have anything in her wardrobe other than handkerchief-sized tops and bottoms. He has a best pal, played by Rajpal Yadav, who wears, horrors, clothes deemed right for an American preppie: capris, tees and baseball caps. Actually, he has a triple role (he's on screen much longer than poor Jimmy) and goes about saying "dude" (pronounced d-yooo-d) and kissing "gori" girls on the mouth. He does it not once, not twice, but thrice. Emraan had better watch out. It can't get much worse than this." Rajiv Kaplish of Tribune India wrote, "What else can one do when there are not one or two but three Rajpal Yadavs in the film? All engaged in a race to make the story as ludicrous as possible. Not that Yadav in a triple role is the one-man demolition squad. Jimmy Shergill who is supposed to be the hero plays no less a damaging role."
