= Class of 2020 =

2020 Hindi web series by Vikas Gupta

- Genre: Teen drama
- Created by: Vikas Gupta
- Directed by: Aarambhh M Singh
- Creative director: Gurneet Chaddha
- Starring: See below
- Country of origin: India
- Original language: Hindi
- No. of seasons: 1
- No. of episodes: 32

Production
- Camera setup: Multi-camera
- Production company: Lost Boy Productions Pvt Ltd.

Original release
- Network: ALTBalaji
- Release: 4 February 2020

Class of 2020 is a 2020 Hindi web series created and produced by Vikas Gupta for Ekta Kapoor's video on demand platform ALTBalaji. It stars Mazhar Khan and Joyita Chatterjee in lead roles. The web series revolves around the lives of a group of teenagers who get involved with drugs, sex, peer pressure and anxiety. On 25 January 2020, the trailer of the series was released. The series started streaming on ALTBalaji on 4 February 2020. It is a sequel to Class of 2017.

== Cast ==
- Rohan Mehra as Ibrahim Noorani
- Joyita Chatterjee as Ranchi Das Gupta
- Sushant Tanwar as Hardik Thakkar
- Chetna Pande as Priyanka Ahluwalia
- Ishaa Chawla as Aalia
- Nibedita Pal as Zoey D'Souza
- Abhishek Ranjan as Lucky Singh
- Mazhar Khan as Ronit Banerjee
- Prakruti Mishra as Ketki
- Pallabi Mukherjee as Palak Dasgupta
- Jatin Suri as Neelrana Banerjee
- Alam Khan as Tanmay Banik (Toto)
- Nausheen Ali Sardar as Hina
- Rushad Rana as Ronit & Neel's dad
- Sagar Saikia as Hina's friend

== Episodes ==
- Episode 1: De Nobili High Returns
- Episode 2: No One Will Believe You
- Episode 3: Welcome To Class Of 2020
- Episode 4: Not Everything Is As It Seems
- Episode 5: Happy Birthday Toto
- Episode 6: Forty-Five Minutes
- Episode 7: Of Mothers and Daughters
- Episode 8: How Was Your Date?
- Episode 9: Parents Of 2020
- Episode 10: I Will Be Your Driver
- Episode 11: Beginning Of The End
- Episode 12: Repercussions of Ignorance
- Episode 13: Sports Day 2018 vs 2020
- Episode 14: Relations 2018 vs 2020
- Episode 15: Night that changed everything
- Episode 16: Men don't cry
- Episode 17: Ibrahim ki Duniya
- Episode 18: Dosti ya Pyaar
- Episode 19: Pyjama Party
- Episode 20: Truth Brings Dare
- Episode 21: Beginning of another end
- Episode 22: I need to talk to you
- Episode 23: Helplessness
- Episode 24: Not All Men Are Jerks
- Episode 25: Love, Sex AUR Dhoka
- Episode 26: The party. The plan and The panic
- Episode 27: The perfect end, is it
- Episode 28: The morning after
- Episode 29: I am your mother
- Episode 30: Last day at de nobli high
- Episode 31: Season Finale Part 1
- Episode 32: Season Finale Part 2
