= MTV Splitsvilla =

Indian reality show

- Also known as: Splitsvilla
- Genre: Reality
- Created by: Purvish Bhatt; Shweta Jangra
- Directed by: Ashish Avsare
- Presented by: Rannvijay Singha; Nikhil Chinapa; Deepti Gujral; Sherlyn Chopra; Sunny Leone; Arjun Bijlani; Tanuj Virwani; Karan Kundrra; Uorfi Javed; Nia Sharma
- Original language: Hindi
- No. of seasons: 16

Production
- Executive producer: Lalit Prem Sharma
- Producer: Colosseum Media

Original release
- Network: MTV India
- Release: 20 June 2008 – present

MTV Splitsvilla is an Indian dating reality show that airs on MTV India and is digitally available on JioHotstar. The sixteenth season was presented by Sunny Leone, Karan Kundrra, Uorfi Javed and Nia Sharma.

== Summary ==
The show revolves around young men and women trying to secure a place in Splitsvilla, a villa where they are detached from the real world. Participants compete in tasks to remain in the competition and mingle with their fellow contestants to find love.

== Series overview ==
=== Splitsvilla ===
Season	Host(s)	Location	Theme(s)	Date		No. of Episodes	No. of Contestants	Winners
Season	Host(s)	Location	Theme(s)	Launch	Finale	No. of Episodes	No. of Contestants	Winners
1	Rannvijay Singha	Goa	—N/a	20 June 2008	13 October 2008	14	22	Vishal Karwal Shraddha Haribhai
2	Nikhil Chinapa	Goa	—N/a	7 March 2009	14 June 2009	15	20	Sidharth Bhardwaj Sakshi Pradhan
3	Nikhil Chinapa Deepti Gujral	Pattaya	—N/a	19 December 2009	13 March 2010	13	20	Parag Chadda Riya Bamniyal
4	Nikhil Chinapa	Dubai	The Gamble of Love	3 December 2010	25 March 2011	18	17	Dushyant Yadav Priya Shinde
5	Nikhil Chinapa	Jim Corbett National Park	Love Gone Wild	7 April 2012	24 June 2012	15	18	Paras Chhabra Akanksha Popli
6	Nikhil Chinapa Sherlyn Chopra	Trivandrum	Hot as Hell	25 May 2013	23 August 2013	15	19	Paramvir Singh Mandy Debbarma
7	Nikhil Chinapa Sunny Leone	Jaipur	—N/a	21 June 2014	25 October 2014	20	30	Mayank Gandhi Scarlett Rose
8	Rannvijay Singha Sunny Leone	Goa	What Women Love	4 July 2015	28 November 2015	22	32	Prince Narula Anuki Tchokhonelidze
9	Rannvijay Singha Sunny Leone	Puducherry	Where Women Rule	11 June 2016	8 October 2016	21	26	Gurmeet Rehal Kavya Khurrana
10	Rannvijay Singha Sunny Leone	Jim Corbett National Park	Catch Your Match	23 July 2017	10 December 2017	21	21	Baseer Ali Naina Singh
11	Rannvijay Singha Sunny Leone	Jim Corbett National Park	Happily (N)Ever After	5 August 2018	3 February 2019	27	22	Gaurav Alugh Shruti Sinha
12	Rannvijay Singha Sunny Leone	Jaipur	Your Best Shot at Love	16 August 2019	17 January 2020	23	26	Shrey Mittal Priyamvada Kant
13	Rannvijay Singha Sunny Leone	Trivandrum	One for Love, One for Chance	6 March 2021	2 October 2021	31	24	Jay Dudhane Aditi Rajput
14	Arjun Bijlani Sunny Leone Uorfi Javed	Goa	Pyaar Samundar Paar	12 November 2022	11 February 2023	27	28	Hamid Barkzi Soundous Moufakir
15	Tanuj Virwani Sunny Leone Uorfi Javed	Udaipur	ExSqueeze Me Please	30 March 2024	11 August 2024	41	33	Jashwanth Bopanna Akriti Negi
16	Karan Kundrra Sunny Leone Uorfi Javed Nia Sharma	Mahabalipuram	Pyaar Ya Paisa	9 January 2026	16 May 2026	56	33	Kushal "Gullu" Tanwar Kaira Anu

=== Wild Villa ===
The season thirteen introduced Wild Villa, a secret villa in Splitsvilla, which gave a wild card chance to enter in Splitsvilla.

Season	Host	Location	Date		No. of Episodes	No. of Contestants
Season	Host	Location	Launch	Finale	No. of Episodes	No. of Contestants
1	Nikhil Chinapa	Trivandrum	13 March 2021	28 August 2021	25	14

== Season 1 ==
MTV Splitsvilla
- Season 1
- Presented by: Rannvijay Singha
- No. of contestants: 23
- Winners: Vishal Karwal; Shraddha Haribhai
- Runners-up: Varun Saini; Heena Pardasani
- No. of episodes: 17

Release
- Original network: MTV India
- Original release: 20 June – 13 October 2008

Series chronology
- Next → Season 2

Splitsvilla 1 premiered in 2008. It was presented by Rannvijay Singh. Vishal Karwal and Shraddha Haribhai emerged as the winners.

Contestant	Dumped by/ Lost to	Status
Vishal Karwal	–	Winner
Shraddha Haribhai	–	Winner
Varun Saini	Lost to Vishal	1st runner-up
Heena Pardasani	Dumped by boys	1st runner-up
Prianca Sharma	Dumped by boys	Eliminated
Ritu Kochhar	Dumped by Vishal and Varun's friends	Eliminated
Bianca Mendonca	Dumped by boys	Eliminated
Bosky Bhatia	Dumped by girls	Eliminated
Hannah Sim	Dumped by boys	Eliminated
Yamini Batra	Dumped by boys	Eliminated
Minakshi Khanduri	Dumped by girls	Eliminated
Shruti Rawat	Dumped by Vishal	Eliminated
Anubha Agarwal	Dumped by Varun	Eliminated
Angela Krislinzki	Dumped for betrayal	Eliminated
Hoorzan Irani	Dumped by boys	Eliminated
Aarti Thaokar	Dumped by boys	Eliminated
Vani Sharma	Dumped by boys	Eliminated
Simran Dhawan	Dumped by boys	Eliminated
Richa Singh	Dumped by boys	Eliminated
Akanksha Kanjilal	Dumped by boys	Eliminated
Kanika Narbar	Dumped by boys	Eliminated
Sneh Richa	Dumped by boys	Eliminated
Sahil Anand	Dumped by girls	Eliminated

== Season 2 ==
MTV Splitsvilla
- Season 2
- Presented by: Nikhil Chinapa
- No. of contestants: 20
- Winners: Sidharth Bhardwaj; Sakshi Pradhan
- Runners-up: Mohit Malhotra; Joanna Magee
- No. of episodes: 15

Release
- Original network: MTV India
- Original release: 7 March – 14 June 2009

Series chronology
- ← Previous; Season 1 Next → Season 3

Splitsvilla 2 premiered in 2009. This season was hosted by VJ Nikhil Chinapa.

Contestant	Dumped by/Lost to	Status
Sidharth Bhardwaj	1st place	Winner
Sakshi Pradhan	1st place	Winner
Mohit Malhotra	2nd place; Lost to Siddharth and Sakshi in finale	1st runner-up
Joanna Magee	2nd place; Lost to Siddharth and Sakshi in finale	1st runner-up
Paramvir Singh	3rd place; Dumped by Siddharth	Eliminated
Stuti Nag	3rd place; Dumped by Siddharth	Eliminated
Bhav Aman Singh	4th place; eliminated; re-entered as wild card as a replacement for Meherzaan; dumped by Joana	Eliminated
Ritika Nainta	4th place; Dumped by Siddharth	Eliminated
Varun Jhamb	5th place; eliminated; re-entered as wild card; dumped by Joana	Eliminated
Sakshi Bhayana	5th place; Dumped by Mohit; re-entered as wild card; dumped by Siddharth	Eliminated
Rahul Dwivedi	6th place; Dumped by Joana	Eliminated
Nalini Negi	7th place; Dumped by Siddharth	Eliminated
Aman Sharma	8th place; Dumped by Joana	Eliminated
Shikha Taneja	9th place; Dumped by Siddharth	Eliminated
Meherzan Mazda	10th place; Quit because of illness	Emergency Exit
Ashutosh Kataria	11th place; Dumped by Joana	Eliminated
Cheshta Bhagat	12th place; Dumped by Mohit	Eliminated
Suyyash Rai	13th place; Dumped by Joena	Eliminated
Meenakshi Negi	14th place; Dumped by Mohit	Eliminated
Swaagata G Shah	15th place; Dumped by Mohit	Eliminated

== Season 3 ==
MTV Splitsvilla
- Season 3
- Presented by: Nikhil Chinapa; Deepti Gujral
- No. of contestants: 20
- Winners: Parag Chadda; Riya Bamniyal
- Runners-up: Vikas Mahendroo; Kriti Sharma
- No. of episodes: 13

Release
- Original network: MTV India
- Original release: 19 December 2009 – 13 March 2010

Series chronology
- ← Previous; Season 2 Next → Season 4

Splitsvilla 3 premiered in 2009 and ended in 2010. The season was hosted by VJ Nikhil Chinapa and Deepti Gujral.

Contestant	Notes	Status
Parag Chadda	Dumped by Pooja, returned in the finale	Winner
Riya Bamniyal	Dumped by Niharika, returned, Queen for episodes 9, 11	Winner
Vikas Mahendroo	King for episodes 9, 11	1st runner-up
Kriti Sharma	Dumped by Mahip; Re-entered in finale	1st runner-up
Sufzal Saleem	3rd place; Dumped by Niharika; returned in the finale but lost	Eliminated
Pavitra Punia	3rd place; Queen for episodes 5, 6, 10	Eliminated
Monika Maryjane Lalwani	Dumped by Vikas	Eliminated
Mahip Marwaha	Dumped, King for episodes 4, 5, 6, 10	Eliminated
Niharika Kareer	Dumped by Vikas, Queen for episodes 4, 7, 8	Eliminated
Arjun Kumar Mahendroo	Dumped by Niharika, King for episodes 1, 2, 3	Eliminated
Pooja Amin	Voluntarily dumped, Queen for episodes 1, 2, 3	Quit
Raj Kumar	Dumped by Pavitra	Eliminated
Ramanjot Singh	Dumped by Pavitra	Eliminated
Nirmal Sandhoo	Dumped by Mahip	Eliminated
Shivkiran Bajwa	Dumped by Arjun	Eliminated
Ashish Agarwal	Voluntarily dumped; King for episodes 7, 8	Quit
Ruchi Arora	Dumped by Arjun	Eliminated
Pulkit Khanna	Dumped by Pooja	Eliminated
Hemant Kaur	Voluntarily dumped	Quit
Priyanka Sharma	dumped by Arjun	Eliminated

indicates a male contestant
indicates a female contestant
indicates the winner's
indicates the runner-up's
indicates the contestant has been eliminated.
indicates the couple contestants
indicates the single contestants

== Season 4 ==
MTV Splitsvilla
- Season 4
- Presented by: Nikhil Chinapa
- No. of contestants: 17
- Winners: Dushyant Yadav; Priya Shinde
- Runners-up: Sai Gundewar; Tina Thapa
- No. of episodes: 18

Release
- Original network: MTV India
- Original release: 3 December 2010 – 25 March 2011

Series chronology
- ← Previous; Season 3 Next → Season 5

Splitsvilla 4 premiered on 3 December 2010. This season was hosted by VJ Nikhil Chinapa.

Contestant	Notes	Status
Dushyant Yadav	Ultimate King	Winner
Priya Shinde	1st, 2nd, 4th, 10th episode's Queen. Awarded as Master Mind of Splitsvilla 4. Ultimate Queen	Winner
Sai Gundewar	Lost in finale	1st runner-up
Tina Thapa	6th episode's Queen, Lost in finale	1st runner-up
Manish Khanna	3rd place	Eliminated
Pooja Bisht	3rd place; 8th, 9th, 12th episode's Queen	Eliminated
Ashish Chaudhary	4th place; Dumped by Manish	Eliminated
Archana Choudhary	4th place; Dumped by Manish	Eliminated
Yashita Sahu	5th place; 6th episode's Queen; Dumped by Manish; returned as wild card; dumped by Sai	Eliminated
Aakriti Bhamri	6th place; 3rd, 5th, 7th, 10th episode's Queen; dumped by Ashish	Eliminated
Sohfi Khan	7th place; 5th, 7th episode's Queen; dumped by Manish; returned as wild card; Dumped by Dushyant	Eliminated
Sanjana Bhatia	8th place; 3rd, 5th, 6th episode's Queen; Dumped by Dushyant	Eliminated
Payal Thapa	9th place; 2nd, 4th episode's Queen; Dumped by Dushyant	Eliminated
Dimple Chawla	10th place; 1st, 2nd, 4th episode's Queen; Dumped by Ashish	Eliminated
Vartika Kaul	11th place; 3rd, 5th episode's Queen; Dumped by Sai	Eliminated
Ruchita Rao	12th place; 3rd dumped by Ashish, returned; Dumped by Ashish	Eliminated
Srishttii Gupta	13th place; 3rd episode's Queen. 4th dumped by Manish	Eliminated

indicates a male contestant
indicates a female contestant
indicates the winner's
indicates the runner-up's
indicates the contestant has been eliminated.
indicates the contestant was in Dushyant's Qabilah.
indicates the contestant was in Sai's Qabilah.
indicates the contestant was in Manish's Qabilah.
indicates the contestant was in Ashish's Qabilah.

Finale: A roulette game based on luck was played between the three finalist pairs: Manish and Pooja, Sai and Tina, and Dushyant and Priya. The first round was won by Sai and Tina who went directly to the finals. The second round was between Manish Pooja and Dushyant Priya to determine who would join Sai Tina for the final round. The round was won by Dushyant Priya who joined Sai Tina in the final round. Dushyant Priya won the final round and were declared the winners of Splitsvilla 4.

== Season 5 ==
MTV Splitsvilla
- Season 5
- Presented by: Nikhil Chinapa
- No. of contestants: 18
- Winners: Paras Chhabra; Akanksha Popli
- Runners-up: Vroon Sharma; Jasmine Avasia
- No. of episodes: 15

Release
- Original network: MTV India
- Original release: 7 April – 24 June 2012

Series chronology
- ← Previous; Season 4 Next → Season 6

Splitsvilla 5 is the fifth season of Indian reality show MTV Splitsvilla. Shot in Jim Corbett National Park, the season premiered on 7 April 2012 and was hosted by Nikhil Chinapa. The finale aired on 24 June 2012 where Paras Chhabra and Akanksha Popli became winners.

Contestant	Notes	Status
Paras Chhabra	1st Place; Dumped by Shivangini; Re-entered as wild card; Defeated Vroon and Jasmine in the finale. Ultimate King	Winner
Akanksha Popli	1st Place; Dumped by Vroon; Re-entered as wild card; Defeated Vroon and Jasmine in finale. Ultimate Queen	Winner
Vroon Sharma	2nd Place; Lost to Paras and Akanksha in the finale	1st runner-up
Jasmine Avasia	2nd Place; Lost to Paras and Akanksha in the finale	1st runner-up
Nitin Chauhaan	3rd Place; Lost to Paras and Akanksha in semi-finale	2nd Runner-Up
Rupa Khurana	3rd Place; Lost to Paras and Akanksha in semi-finale	2nd Runner-Up
Rishabh Sinha	4th Place; Dumped by Rupa over Nitin and Paras.	Eliminated
Vidushi Khanna	5th Place; Dumped by Vroon over Akanksha and Jasmine	Eliminated
Rishipal Gulati	6th Place; Dumped by Shivangini; Re-entered as a wild card; Dumped by Rupa	Eliminated
Shivangini Rajyalaxmi Rana	7th Place; Dumped by boys of villa.	Eliminated
Aly Goni	8th Place; Dumped by Rupa	Eliminated
Tasneem Sheikh	9th Place; Dumped by Vroon	Eliminated
Avishka Kashyap	10th Place; Dumped by Vroon; Re-entered and replaced with Vidhushi to be dumped	Eliminated
Nikhil Nagpal	11th Place; Dumped by Rupa	Eliminated
Saif Mir	12th Place; Dumped by Shivangini	Eliminated
Swati Bakshi	13th Place; Dumped by Vroon	Eliminated
Mandakranta Debbarma	14th Place; Dumped by Shivangini	Eliminated
Sikander Dhawan	15th Place; Dumped by Shivangini	Eliminated

== Season 6 ==
MTV Splitsvilla
- Season 6
- Presented by: Nikhil Chinapa; Sherlyn Chopra
- No. of contestants: 19
- Winners: Paramvir Singh; Mandy Debbarma
- Runners-up: Prabjot Sahota; Shatakshi Joshi
- No. of episodes: 15

Release
- Original network: MTV India
- Original release: 25 May – 23 August 2013

Splitsvilla 6 premiered on 25 May 2013 and was hosted by Sherlyn Chopra and Nikhil Chinapa. Its tagline was "Hot as Hell". There were nine boys and nine girls. The season had a review segment, Sexy Sana, hosted by Sana Saeed.

Contestant	Notes	Status
Paramvir Singh	1st Place; Season 2 contestant; Ultimate King	Winner
Mandy Debbarma	1st Place; Season 5 contestant; Ultimate Queen	Winner
Prabhjot Sahota	2nd Place	1st runner-up
Shatakshi Joshi	2nd Place	1st runner-up
Gaurav Chopra	3rd Place; Lost before finale task	Eliminated
Subuhi Joshi	3rd Place; Lost before finale task	Eliminated
Ashwini	4th Place; Dumped by Dumped Splitsvillians	Eliminated
Priyanka Chauhan	4th Place; Dumped by Dumped Splitsvillians	Eliminated
Ruby Dahiya	5th Place; Re-entered and Dumped by Param	Eliminated
Aman Dev Pahwa	6th Place; Re-entered and Dumped by Subuhi	Eliminated
Pari Sahni	7th Place; Re-entered and Dumped by Param	Eliminated
Nitin Sharma	8th Place; Dumped by Mandy	Eliminated
Parichay Sharma	9th Place; Re-entered and Dumped by Mandy	Eliminated
Peenaz Ahmed	10th Place; Dumped by Nitin, Re-entered & Dumped by Param	Eliminated
Arjit Taneja	11th Place; Dumped by Mandy	Eliminated
Purvee	12th Place; Dumped by Param	Eliminated
Nawab Faizi	13th Place; Dumped by Ruby	Eliminated
Priyanka Chandel	14th Place; Dumped by Nitin	Eliminated

== Season 7 ==
MTV Splitsvilla
- Season 7
- Presented by: Nikhil Chinapa; Sunny Leone
- No. of contestants: 30
- Winners: Mayank Gandhi; Scarlett Rose
- Runners-up: Abhishek Malik; Khushi Bhat
- No. of episodes: 20

Release
- Original network: MTV India
- Original release: 21 June – 25 October 2014

Series chronology
- ← Previous; Season 6 Next → Season 8

Splitsvilla 7 is the seventh season of Indian reality show MTV Splitsvilla. Shot in Jaipur, the season was hosted by Sunny Leone and Nikhil Chinapa. It started in June, 2014 and ended on 25 October 2014 where Mayank Gandhi and Scarlett Rose won the season.

There were seven boys and twenty girls. This season was set in Samode Palace, Jaipur, India. In this season, the audience got to see old Splitsvilla contestants like Ashwini Koul and Rishabh Sinha. Ashwini chose to quit the game after his lady love Sanjana decided to leave the show due to an injury sustained during a task. Rishabh was dumped by Khushi. There were two kings and two queens in this season: Shravan Reddy and Abhishek Malik and Queens: Khushi Bhatia and Dana Vana. The season of Splitsvilla was the most popular season due to presence of Sunny Leone, a popular film star. There were two female, Dana Vana and Ranji and one male, Yasir Khan, wildcard entries through MTV Battleground. Scarlett Rose and Mayank Gandhi won the show.

Contestant	Notes	Status
Mayank Gandhi	1st Place; Ultimate King	Winner
Scarlett Rose	1st Place; Ultimate Queen	Winner
Abhishek Malik	2nd Place	1st runner-up
Khushi Bhat	2nd Place	1st runner-up
Shravan Reddy	3rd Place; Lost finale task	Eliminated
Dana Vana	3rd Place; Lost finale task; 1st Wild Card Entrant	Eliminated
Yasir Khan	4th Place; out before finale task by Splitsvillans; 3rd Wild Card Entrant	Eliminated
Apurva Singh	4th Place; out before finale task by Splitsvillans	Eliminated
Priyanka Purohit	5th Place; Dumped by Mayank Gandhi	Eliminated
Ranji Chopra	6th Place; 2nd Wild Card Entrant; Dumped by Mayank Gandhi	Eliminated
Mayank Pawar	7th Place; Dumped by Dana Vana	Eliminated
Rashi Sharma	8th place; Dumped by Abhishek Malik	Eliminated
Ayaz Ahmed	9th Place; Dumped by Khushi Bhat	Eliminated
Rishabh Sinha	10th place; Season 5 contestant; Dumped by Khushi Bhat	Eliminated
Jacqueline Ledli	11th Place; Dumped by Shravan Reddy	Eliminated
Palak Purswani	12th Place; Dumped by Shravan Reddy	Eliminated
Savita Dokwal	13th Place; Dumped By Shravan Reddy	Eliminated
Unnati Pathak	14th Place; Dumped by Shravan Reddy	Eliminated
Pooja Mishra	15th Place; Dumped by Shravan Reddy	Eliminated
Heena Koranga	16th Place; Dumped by Shravan Reddy	Eliminated
Ashwini Koul	17th place; left for Sanjana; Season 6 contestant	Quit
Sanjana Ganesan	18th Place; Left due to injury	Quit
Simran Mahendrawal	19th Place; Dumped by Shravan Reddy	Eliminated
Sonali Katyal	20th Place; Dumped by Shravan Reddy	Eliminated
Damanjit Grewal	21st Place; Lost against Priyanka Purohit	Eliminated
Rosemary Fernandes	22nd Place; Lost against Palak Purswani	Eliminated
Snoove Das	23rd Place; Lost against Unnati Pathak	Eliminated
Etansha Gupta	24th Place; Lost against Sanjana Ganesan	Eliminated
Kriti Lohia	25th Place; Lost against Heena Koranga	Eliminated
Mukta Chopra	26th Place; Lost against Jaqueline Ledli	Eliminated

== Season 8 ==
MTV Splitsvilla
- Season 8
- Presented by: Rannvijay Singha; Sunny Leone
- No. of contestants: 32
- Winners: Prince Narula; Anuki Tchokhonelidze
- Runners-up: Utkarsh Gupta; Sana Sayyad
- No. of episodes: 22

Release
- Original network: MTV India
- Original release: 3 July – 14 November 2015

Series chronology
- ← Previous; Season 7 Next → Season 9

Splitsvilla 8 is the eighth season of Indian reality show MTV Splitsvilla. Shot in Goa, the season was hosted by Rannvijay Singha and Sunny Leone. with Karan Kundrra appearing on the show to host a couple of segments. This season saw fourteen girls and eight boys from the auditions, and eight celebrity boys. Subuhi Joshi from Splitsvilla 6 re-entered the show as a queen. The season's theme was "What Women Love".

The season was talked about due to two contestants Karishma and Gaurav being confident and indicating that they had bisexual tones. Gaurav had to quit due to illness. The primary rule of the show was that those who were already in a relationship outside the villa were not permitted to participate. Since two contestants Ish and Viren broke this rule, they were eliminated.

Contestant	Notes	Status
Prince Narula	1st Place; Banished by Subuhi Joshi : Re-entered; Ultimate King,	Winner
Anuki Tchokhonelidze	1st Place; Ultimate Queen	Winner
Utkarsh Gupta	2nd Place; Lost against Prince and Anuki	1st runner-up
Sana Sayyad	2nd Place; Dumped by Paras : Re-entered; Dumped by Prince: Re-entered; Lost against Prince and Anuki	1st runner-up
Zaan Khan	3rd Place; Lost against Prince and Anuki	2nd runner-up
Karishma Talwar	3rd Place; Lost against Prince and Anuki	2nd runner-up
Ishaan Chibber	4th Place; Banished by Karishma Talwar; Re-entered; Lost against Zaan & Karishma	Eliminated
Subuhi Joshi	4th Place; Season 6 contestant; Lost against Zaan & Karishma	Eliminated
Sophiya Singh	5th Place; Wild Card Entrant, Dumped by Yash Pandit	Eliminated
Yash Pandit	5th Place; Banished by Subuhi Joshi; Re-entered; Quit	Quit
Amaad Mintoo	6th Place; Banished by Subuhi Joshi; Lost against Ishan Chhibber	Eliminated
Paras Chhabra	7th Place; Banished by Prince; Lost against Ishan Chhibber	Eliminated
Priyanka Bora	8th Place; Dumped by Karishma Talwar	Eliminated
Mia Lakra	9th Place; Dumped by Paras Chhabra	Eliminated
Reshu Singh	10th Place; Dumped by Subuhi Joshi	Eliminated
Vanessa D'Souza	11th Place; Dumped by Subuhi Joshi	Eliminated
Gaurav Arora	12th Place; Withdraw due to illness	Quit
Viren Singh Rathore	13th Place; Left: Violation of Rules	Disqualified
Ish Thakkar	14th Place; Left: Violation of Rules	Disqualified
Vaidehi Srivastava	15th Place; Dumped by Paras Chhabra	Eliminated
Prathamesh Maulingkar	16th Place; Dumped by Subuhi Joshi	Eliminated
Ravi shukla	17th Place; Dumped by Subuhi Joshi	Eliminated
Abhishek Yennam	18th Place; Dumped by Subuhi Joshi	Eliminated
Nishant V Anand	19th Place; Dumped by Subuhi Joshi	Eliminated
Abhijeet Dutta	20th Place; Dumped by Subuhi Joshi	Eliminated
Shivam Babbar	21st Place; Dumped by Subuhi Joshi	Eliminated
Ashmita Singh	22nd Place; Dumped by Utkarsh Gupta	Eliminated
Sharika Raina	23rd Place; Dumped by Utkarsh Gupta	Eliminated
Veronika Rajput	24th Place; Dumped by Utkarsh Gupta	Eliminated
Harshita Kashyap	25th Place; Dumped by Prince Narula	Eliminated
Enakshi Sharma	26th Place; Dumped by Zaan Khan	Eliminated
Alisha Sharma	27th Place; Dumped by Prathamesh Maulingkar	Eliminated

== Season 9 ==
MTV Splitsvilla
- Season 9
- Presented by: Rannvijay Singha; Sunny Leone
- No. of contestants: 26
- Winners: Gurmeet Singh Rehal; Kavya Khurana
- Runners-up: Varun Sood; Martina Thariyan; Pratik Kalsi; Rajnandini Borpuzori
- No. of episodes: 21

Release
- Original network: MTV India
- Original release: 11 June – 8 October 2016

Series chronology
- ← Previous; Season 8 Next → Season 10

Splitsvilla 9, is the ninth season of Indian reality show MTV Splitsvilla. Shot in Puducherry, the season was hosted by Rannvijay Singh and Sunny Leone. The show premiered on 11 June 2016. This season had fifteen celebrity boys and six girls with the theme "Where Women Rule". The boys were not given the power to dump any girl. Three princesses and two warriors joined as wild card entries. Martina was the first queen followed by Rajnandini and then Kavya. The season finale aired on 8 October 2016 and was won by Gurmeet Singh Rehal and Kavya Khurana.

Contestant	Notes	Status
Gurmeet Singh Rehal	1st Place; Dumped by Rajnandini : Re-entered; only & ultimate King	Winner
Kavya Khurana	1st Place; 3rd & ultimate Queen	Winner
Varun Sood	2nd Place; Dumped by Rajnandini: Re-entered; Dumped by Rajnandini:Re-entered; Lost against Gurmeet and Kavya	runner-up
Martina Thariyan	2nd Place; 1st Queen of Villa; Lost against Gurmeet and Kavya	runner-up
Pratik "Archie" Kalsi	3rd Place; Dumped by Kavya; Re-entered; Lost against Gurmeet and Kavya	runner up
Rajnandini Borpuzari	3rd Place; 2nd Queen of the villa; Lost against Gurmeet and Kavya	runner up
Nikhil Sachdeva	4th Place; Eliminated Before Finale Task due to having no partner	Eliminated
Mia Lakra	5th Place; Entered as 2nd wild card Princess; Lost against Martina Thariyan	Eliminated
Shreeradhe Khanduja	6th Place; Entered as first wild card Princess:	Eliminated
Karan Khanna	7th Place; Dumped by Kavya Khurana	Eliminated
Abhishek Singh Pathania	8th Place; Dumped by Kavya Khurana & Rajnandini Borpuzori	Eliminated
Isha Anand Sharma	9th Place; Dumped by Kavya Khurana & Rajnandani Borpuzori	Eliminated
Ayan Khan	10th Place; Entered as 1st Wild Card Warrior; Dumped by Rajnandini Borpuzori	Eliminated
Priya Haridas	11th Place; Entered as a 3rd Wild Card Princess; Dumped by Kavya Khurana	Eliminated
Karan Chhabra	12th Place; Dumped by Martina Thairan; Re-entered; Dumped ny Kavya Khurana	Eliminated
Zain Abideen	13th Place; Entered as 2nd Wild Card Warrior; Sacrifice for Priya Haridas	Quit
Aditya Singh Rajput	14th Place; Dumped by Martina Thairan	Eliminated
Mayuri Das	14th Place; Dumped by Martina Thairan	Eliminated
Akhil Kataria	15th Place; Dumped by Martina Thairan	Eliminated
Anuranjan Awasthi	16th Place; Dumped by Martina Thairan	Eliminated
Niharika Ghai	17th Place; Dumped By Martina Thairan and Lost against Rajnandini Borpuzori	Eliminated
Harshit Tomar	18th Place; Dumped by Martina Thairan	Eliminated
Milind Manek	19th Place; Dumped by Martina Thairan	Eliminated
Shubhashish Banerjee	20th Place; Dumped by Martina Thairan	Eliminated
Ishaan Singh Manhas	21st Place; Dumped by Princesses	Eliminated
Sushant Mohindru	22nd Place; Dumped by Princesses	Eliminated

== Season 10 ==
MTV Splitsvilla
- Season 10
- Presented by: Rannvijay Singha; Sunny Leone
- No. of contestants: 21
- Winners: Baseer Ali; Naina Singh
- Runners-up: Priyank Sharma; Divya Agarwal
- No. of episodes: 21

Release
- Original network: MTV India
- Original release: 23 July – 10 December 2017

Series chronology
- ← Previous; Season 9 Next → Season 11

Splitsvilla 10 is the tenth season of the Indian reality TV series MTV Splitsvilla. It premiered on 23 July 2017 on MTV India. Hosted by Sunny Leone and Rannvijay Singh.The show consisted of ten boys and ten girls +1 wild card who came to find true love. The theme of the season was "Experiment of Love", i.e. experimenting and testing whether love can be found through science or not. There was a new concept of ideal matches. The show was shot in Jim Corbett National Park. It was the second season to stream on Voot. The season ended on 10 December 2017 with Naina Singh and Baseer Ali being declared as the winners.

Contestant	Notes	Status
Baseer Ali	1st Place	Winner
Naina Singh	1st Place	Winner
Priyank Sharma	2nd Place; Lost against Baseer and Naina	1st runner-up
Divya Agarwal	2nd Place; Dumped by Aquib and Hritu, Re-entered, Lost against Baseer and Naina	1st runner-up
Mohit Hiranandani	3rd Place; Lost against Priyank and Divya	Eliminated
Steffi Cyril	3rd Place; Lost against Priyank and Divya	Eliminated
Haneet Narang	4th Place;Lost against Baseer and Naina	Eliminated
Alisha Farrer	4th Place; Lost against Baseer and Naina	Eliminated
Siddharth Sharma	5th Place; Dumped by Ex-contestants	Eliminated
Akshata Sonawane	5th Place; Dumped by Ex-contestants	Eliminated
Akash Chaudhary	6th Place; Dumped by Mohit and Steffi; lost against Priyank and Divya	Eliminated
Hritu Zee	6th Place; lost against Priyank and Divya	Eliminated
Aquib Mir	7th Place; Entered as wild card entrant; Dumped by Hritu Zee	Eliminated
Nibedita Pal	8th Place; Dumped by Priyank Sharma	Eliminated
Ripudaman Singh	9th Place; Dumped by Aquib and Hritu	Eliminated
Maddy Sharma	10th Place; Dumped by Haneet and Alisha	Eliminated
Anmol Chaudhary	11th Place; Dumped by Priyank and Nibedita	Eliminated
Nachiket Karekar	11th Place; Dumped by Priyank and Nibedita	Eliminated
Eisha Chaudhary	12th Place; Dumped by Haneet and Alisha	Eliminated
Khushi Mukherjee	13th Place; Dumped by Siddharth and Akshata	Eliminated
Archit Bhatia	14th Place; Dumped by Siddharth and Akshata	Eliminated

== Season 11 ==
MTV Splitsvilla
- Season 11
- Presented by: Rannvijay Singha; Sunny Leone; (Hosts); Baseer Ali; Divya Agarwal; (Villa Insiders)
- No. of contestants: 22
- Winners: Gaurav Alugh; Shruti Sinha
- Runners-up: Shagun Pandey; Samyuktha Hegde
- No. of episodes: 27

Release
- Original network: MTV India
- Original release: 5 August 2018 – 3 February 2019

Series chronology
- ← Previous; Season 10 Next → Season 12

MTV Splitsvilla 11, styled as Splitsvilla XI, was the eleventh season of the Indian reality TV series MTV Splitsvilla. It premiered on 5 August 2018 on MTV India. Hosted by Sunny Leone and Rannvijay Singha, the show consisted of ten boys and nine girls who came to play the game of love. Shot in Jim Corbett National Park following the previous season, the theme of the season was "Happily (N)Ever After" or "Happily Ever After....Or Never After?". The season was won by Gaurav Alugh and Shruti Sinha whereas Shagun Pandey and Samyuktha Hegde emerged as first runner-up.

Contestant	Notes	Status
Gaurav Alugh	1st Place; Entered as wild card; Defeated Shagun and Samyuktha in the finale	Winners
Shruti Sinha	1st Place; Defeated Shagun and Samyuktha in the finale	Winners
Shagun Pandey	2nd Place; Lost Against Gaurav and Shruti	1st Runner Up
Samyuktha Hegde	2nd Place; Entered as wild card; Lost Against Gaurav and Shruti	1st Runner Up
Kabeer Bhartiya	3rd Place;lost against Gaurav and Shruti & Shagun and Samyuktha	Semi Finalist
Anushka Mitra	3rd Place; Lost against Gaurav and Shruti & Shagun and Samyuktha	Semi Finalist
Anshuman Malhotra	4th Place; Lost against Gaurav and Shruti & Shagun and Samyuktha	Semi Finalist
Roshni Wadhwani	4th Place;Dumped by Gaurav Shruti; Re-entered; Lost against Gaurav and Shruti & Shagun and Samyuktha	Semi Finalist
Maera Mishra	5th Place; Dumped by ex-splitsvillains	Eliminated
Fahad Ali	5th Place; Dumped by ex-splitsvillains	Eliminated
Mehak Ghai	6th Place; Entered as wild card entrant; Dumped by ex-splitsvillains	Eliminated
Aarushi Dutta	7th Place; Dumped by Fahad Ali	Eliminated
Arushi Handa	8th Place; Dumped by Fahad and Mehak	Eliminated
Simba Nagpal	9th Place; Dumped by Anshuman and Roshni	Eliminated
Rohan Hingorani	9th Place; Dumped by Anshuman and Roshni	Eliminated
Monal Jagtani	10th Place; Dumped by Rohan, Shruti and Samyuktha	Eliminated
Gaurav Sharma	11th Place; Dumped by Anshuman and Roshni	Eliminated
Karan Manocha	12th Place; Dumped by Shagun and Arushi Handa	Eliminated
Sheetal Tiwari	13th Place; Lost against Fahad Ali	Eliminated
Anshula Dhawan	14th Place; Dumped by Kabeer and Anushka Mitra	Eliminated
Puneet Kumar	15th Place; Dumped by Aarushi Dutta	Eliminated
Chetan Titre	16th Place; Dumped by Boys of Villa	Eliminated

== Season 12 ==
MTV Splitsvilla
- Season 12
- Presented by: Rannvijay Singha; Sunny Leone
- No. of contestants: 26
- Winners: Priyamvada Kant; Shrey Mittal
- Runners-up: Ashish Bhatia; Miesha Iyer
- No. of episodes: 23

Release
- Original network: MTV India
- Original release: 16 August 2019 – 17 January 2020

Series chronology
- ← Previous; Season 11 Next → Season 13

MTV Splitsvilla 12, styled as MTV Splitsvilla X2, was the twelfth season of the Indian reality TV series MTV Splitsvilla. Shot in Jaipur, the season premiered on 16 August 2019 and was hosted by Sunny Leone and Rannvijay Singh. The tagline of the season was "Your Best Shot at Love". Priyamvada Kant and Shrey Mittal won the show while Ashish Bhatia and Miesha Iyer became the runner-ups.

Contestant	Notes	Status
Shrey Mittal	1st Place; Defeated Ashish and Miesha in the finale	Winner
Priyamvada Kant	1st Place; Defeated Ashish and Miesha in the finale	Winner
Ashish Bhatia	2nd Place; Lost against Shrey and Priyamvada	1st Runner-up
Miesha Iyer	2nd Place; Lost against Shrey and Priyamvada	1st Runner-up
Alfez Khaishagi	3rd Place; Lost against Ashish and Miesha	Eliminated
Aradhana Sharma	3rd Place; Lost against Ashish and Miesha	Eliminated
Uday Sachdeva	4th Place; Lost against Shrey And Priyamvada	Eliminated
Bhavya Singh	4th Place; Lost against Shrey And Priyamvada	Eliminated
Piyush Sharma	5th Place; Lost against Alfez and Aradhana	Eliminated
Arshiya Arshi	5th Place; Dumped by Ashish & Miesha, re entered as wild card Lost against Alfez and Aradhana	Eliminated
Sambhav Baid	6th Place; Lost Against Piyush And Arshiya	Eliminated
Soundarya Thakur	6th Place; Lost Against Piyush And Arshiya	Eliminated
Loka Bista	7th Place; Dumped by Ashish & Miesha	Eliminated
Hridya Prajapati	7th Place; Dumped by Ashish & Miesha	Eliminated
Bhavin Bhanushali	8th Place; Entered as wild card entrant; Dumped by Ashish & Miesha	Eliminated
Aahna Sharma	9th Place; Dumped by Uday and Bhavya	Eliminated
Alice Gari	10th Place; Dumped by Ashish & Miesha	Eliminated
Ankush Rampal	11th Place; Disqualified due to misbehaviour with female contestants	Ejected
Jinal Sharma	12th Place; Dumped by Ashish & Miesha	Eliminated
Shivam Bihari	13th Place; Dumped by Ashish & Miesha	Eliminated
Anshit Khandelwal	14th Place; Dumped by Alfez and Aradhana	Eliminated
Rahul Gujral	15th Place; Dumped by Aradhana Sharma	Eliminated
Pranav Bhardwaj	16th Place; Dumped by Hridya Prajapati	Eliminated
Pratyaksh Rajbhatt	17th Place; Dumped by Jinal Sharma	Eliminated
Pulkit Kapoor	18th Place; Dumped by Miesha Iyer	Eliminated
Aman Dheer	19th Place; Dumped by Alice Gari	Eliminated

== Season 13 ==
MTV Splitsvilla
- Season 13
- Presented by: Rannvijay Singha; Sunny Leone (Splitsvilla); Nikhil Chinapa (Wild Villa)
- No. of contestants: 27 (including Wild Villa)
- Winners: Jay Dudhane; Aditi Rajput
- Runners-up: Shivam Sharma; Pallak Yadav

Release
- Original network: MTV India
- Original release: 6 March – 2 October 2021

Series chronology
- ← Previous; Season 12 Next → season 14

MTV Splitsvilla 13, styled as MTV Splitsvilla X3, is the thirteenth season of the Indian reality TV series MTV Splitsvilla. Shot in Kerala, the season was hosted by Sunny Leone and Rannvijay Singha, and premiered on 6 March 2021. Initially the season consisted of 9 boys and 12 girls who came to play the game of love, 3 contestants along with 3 dumped contestants entered from Wild Villa. The theme of the season was based on Cupid's Gold and Silver arrow, with taglines "One for Love, One for Chance" and "Let Cupid work his magic". The finale aired on 2 October 2021 where Jay Dudhane and Aditi Rajput emerged as the winners.

Contestant	Notes	Status
Jay Dudhane	1st place; defeated Shivam and Pallak in the finale	Winner
Aditi Rajput	1st place; defeated Shivam and Pallak in the finale	Winner
Shivam Sharma	2nd place; lost in finale against Jay and Aditi	1st Runner-Up
Pallak Yadav	2nd place; lost in finale against Jay and Aditi	1st Runner-Up
Dhruv Malik	3rd place; lost in semi-finale	2nd Runner-Up
Sapna Malic	3rd place; entered as a wild card, lost in semi-finale	2nd Runner-Up
Nikhil Malik	4th Place; lost in semi-finale	3rd Runner-Up
Bhoomika Vasishth	4th Place; lost in semi-finale	3rd Runner-Up
Avantika Sharma	5th place; dumped by Kat and Kevin (Ideal Match); entered Wild Villa	Eliminated
Avantika Sharma	Re-entered as a wild card; eliminated in quarter-finale	Eliminated
Piyush Manwani	5th Place; entered as a wild card; eliminated in quarter-finale	Eliminated
Samruddhi Jadhav	6th Place; dumped by Kat and Kevin (Ideal Match); entered wild villa	Eliminated
Samruddhi Jadhav	Re-entered as a wild card, dumped due to Oracle Consequences	Eliminated
Trevon Dias	6th Place; dumped due to Oracle Consequences	Eliminated
Kat Kristian	7th Place; walked along with Kevin	Quit
Kevin Almasifar	7th Place; disqualified for physical violence with Shivam	Ejected
Nikita Bhamidipati	8th Place; dumped by Dhruv and Sapna (Ideal Match)	Eliminated
Samarthya Gupta	8th Place; dumped by Jay and Aditi (Ideal Match), entered Wild Villa	Eliminated
Samarthya Gupta	Re-entered as a wild card, dumped by Dhruv and Sapna (Ideal Match)	Eliminated
Arushi Chib	9th Place; dumped by Kevin and Kat (Ideal Match)	Eliminated
Gary Lu	10th Place; dumped by Kat and Kevin (Ideal match)	Eliminated
Vyomesh Koul	11th Place; withdrew due to illness	Quit
Riya Kishanchandani	12th Place; dumped by Kevin and Kat (Ideal Match)/lost survival challenge, entered Wild Villa	Eliminated
Janvi Sikaria	11th Place; dumped by Kevin and Kat (Ideal Match), entered Wild Villa	Eliminated
Janvi Sikaria	Lost in Finale/wild card chance to Splitsvilla	Eliminated
Devashish Chandiramani	12th Place; dumped by Kevin and Kat (Ideal Match), entered Wild Villa	Eliminated
Devashish Chandiramani	Lost in 2nd elimination challenge/wild card chance to Splitsvilla	Eliminated
Shweta Nair	13th Place; dumped by Nikhil Malik, entered Wild Villa	Eliminated
Azma Fallah	14th Place; dumped by nikhil and pallak	Eliminated

indicates a male contestant
indicates a female contestant
indicates the winner's
indicates the runner-up's
indicates the contestant have left due to emergency/medical reasons.
indicates the contestant has been removed from the show.
indicates the contestant has been eliminated.
indicates the original Splitsvilla contestants.
indicates the celebrity contestants.
Indicates the contestants was a Facebook audition entry.
indicates the original wild villa contestants.

== Season 14 ==
MTV Splitsvilla
- Season 14
- Presented by: Arjun Bijlani; Sunny Leone (Hosts); Abhimanyu Raghav; Anushka Mitra (Villa Insiders)
- No. of contestants: 28
- Winners: Soundous Moufakir; Hamid Barkzi
- Runners-up: Justin D'Cruz; Sakshi Shrivas

Release
- Original network: MTV India
- Original release: 12 November 2022 – 11 February 2023

Series chronology
- ← Previous; Season 13 Next → Season 15

Splitsvilla 14, styled as Splitsvilla X4, is the fourteenth season of the Indian reality series MTV Splitsvilla. Shot in Goa, the season was hosted by Sunny Leone and Arjun Bijlani along with Anushka Mitra and Abhimanyu Raghav as Villa Insiders. It premiered on 12 November 2022 on MTV India. The Grand Finale premiered on 11 February 2023 where Hamid Barkzi and Soundous Moufakir emerged as the winners.

Contestant	Notes	Status
Hamid Barkzi	Defeated Justin & Sakshi S and Kashish & Akashlina in the finale	Winner
Soundous Moufakir	Defeated Justin & Sakshi S and Kashish & Akashlina in the finale	Winner
Justin D'Cruz	Lost in finale against Hamid & Soundous	1st Runner-up
Sakshi Shrivas	Lost in finale against Hamid & Soundous	1st Runner-up
Kashish Thakur	Lost in finale against Hamid & Soundous and Justin & Sakshi S	2nd runner-Up
Akashlina Chandra	Lost in finale against Hamid & Soundous and Justin & Sakshi S	2nd runner-Up
Amir Hossein	Lost in Semi Finale against Justin & Sakshi S	Eliminated
Pema Leilani	Lost in Semi Finale against Justin & Sakshi S	Eliminated
Prakshi Goyal	Lost in Semi Finale against Kashish & Akashlina	Eliminated
Tara Prasad	Lost in Semi Finale against Kashish & Akashlina	Eliminated
Honey Kamboj	Dumped By Hamid & Soundous	Eliminated
Moose Jattana	Dumped by Hamid & Soundous	Eliminated
Mehak Sembhy	Dumped by Hamid & Soundous	Eliminated
Sohail D	Dumped by Kashish T & Akashlina	Eliminated
Shrea Prasad	Dumped by Honey & Moose	Eliminated
Aagaz Akhtar	Dumped by Justin & Sakshi S	Eliminated
Hiba Trabelssi	Dumped by Justin & Sakshi S	Eliminated
Kashish Ratnani	Dumped by Amir & Pema	Eliminated
Samarth Jurel	Dumped by Amir & Pema	Eliminated
Aradhana Verma	Dumped by Kashish T & Akashlina	Eliminated
Sakshi Dwivedi	Dumped by Kashish T & Akashlina	Eliminated
Shivam Sharma	Dumped by Kashish T & Akashlina	Eliminated
Joshua Chhabra	Dumped by Prakshi	Eliminated
Uorfi Javed	Revealed as Mischief Maker	Guest
Saumya Bhandari	Dumped by Amir, Pema & Shrea	Eliminated
Rishabh Jaiswal	Dumped by Honey & Akashlina	Eliminated
Oviya Darnal	Dumped by Kashish T & Uorfi and Hamid & Soundous	Eliminated
Dhruvin Busa	Dumped by Justin & Sakshi S	Eliminated

indicates original contestants.
indicates wild-card contestants.

== Season 15 ==
MTV Splitsvilla
- Season 15
- Presented by: Tanuj Virwani; Sunny Leone
- No. of contestants: 26
- Winners: Jashwanth Bopanna; Akriti Negi
- Runners-up: Harsh Arora; Rushali Yadav
- No. of episodes: 41

Release
- Original network: MTV India
- Original release: 30 March – 11 August 2024

Series chronology
- ← Previous; Season 14 Next → Season 16

Splitsvilla 15, styled as Splitsvilla X5, was the fifteenth season of the Indian reality series MTV Splitsvilla. Shot in Udaipur, the season was hosted by Sunny Leone and Tanuj Virwani. It premiered on 30 March 2024, on MTV India and is digitally available on JioCinema. The grand finale premiered on 11 August 2024, where Jashwanth Bopanna and Akriti Negi emerged as the winners while Harsh Arora and Rushali Yadav finished as the runner-ups. The tagline for the season was "ExSqueeze Me Please".

Janta Jury Live event premiered on JioCinema before finals. It was a fan bonus episode featuring most talked-about contestants where they face the heat from India's top fan pages and media houses in a courtroom-style showdown. The episode also witnessed a full-house fan fest with contestants sharing their experiences, insights, and juicy gossip, leading to epic face-offs.

Contestant	Notes	Status
Akriti Negi	Defeated Harsh and Rushali in the finale	Winners
Jashwanth Bopanna	Defeated Harsh and Rushali in the finale	Winners
Harsh Arora	Lost in finale against Jashwanth and Akriti	Runners-up
Rushali Yadav	Lost in finale against Jashwanth and Akriti	Runners-up
Digvijay Singh Rathee	Eliminated due to Kashish choosing money	Finalist
Kashish Kapoor	Walked; with ₹10 lakh cash prize	Finalist; Walked
Siwet Tomar	Dumped by Akriti	Eliminated
Siwet Tomar	Re-entered; Lost in semi-finale against Digvijay and Kashish	Eliminated
Anicka Sharma	Lost in semi-finale against Digvijay and Kashish	Eliminated
Arbaz Patel	Lost in semi-finale against Harsh and Rushali	Eliminated
Nayera Ahuja	Siwet's ex; Lost in semi-finale against Harsh and Rushali	Eliminated
Lakshay Gaur	Anicka's ex; Dumped (by unsafe contestants)	Eliminated
Shubhi Joshi	Harsh's ex; Dumped (by unsafe contestants)	Eliminated
Aniket Lama	Dumped (by safe contestants)	Eliminated
Deekila Sherpa	Aniket's ex; Dumped (by safe contestants)	Eliminated
Addy Jain	Dumped by Mischief Box twist	Eliminated
Dev Karan Sharma	Dumped by Mischief Box twist	Eliminated
Shobhika Bali	Dumped by Harsh and Shubhi	Eliminated
Sachin Sharma	Akriti's ex; Dumped by Harsh and Shubhi	Eliminated
Unnati Tomar	Adit's ex; Dumped by Harsh and Shubhi	Eliminated
Swastika Bhattacharjee	Sachin's ex; Left due to personal reasons	Walked
Ishita Rawat	Dumped by Ayushman; Entered ex-Isle	Eliminated
Ishita Rawat	Re-entered; Dumped by Akriti	Eliminated
Ameha Gurung	Dumped by Harsh and Shubhi (Ideal Match)	Eliminated
Ruru Thakur	Yuvraj's ex; Dumped by Harsh and Shubhi (Ideal Match)	Eliminated
Adit Minocha	Left due to medical issue	Walked
Khanak Waghnani	Dumped (by unsafe contestants)	Eliminated
Yuvraj Bassi	Dumped (by unsafe contestants)	Eliminated
Dewangini Vyas	Dumped by Digvijay and Unnati (Ideal Match)	Eliminated
Divyansh Pokharna	Dewangini's ex; Dumped by Digvijay and Unnati (Ideal Match)	Eliminated
Ayushmaan Maggu	Dumped by Harsh and Rushali (Ideal Match)	Eliminated
Rigden Nadik Bhutia	Ameha's ex; Dumped by Harsh and Rushali (Ideal Match)	Eliminated
Nidhi Goyal	Dumped (by unsafe contestants)	Eliminated
Rahul Raja	Nidhi's ex; Dumped by Jashwanth and Akriti (Ideal Match)	Eliminated
Niharika "Arica" Porwal	Dumped by Jashwanth and Akriti (Ideal Match)	Eliminated

indicates female contestants.
indicates male contestants.
indicates Splitsvilla contestants.
indicates Ex-Isle contestants.
indicates wildcard contestants.

== Season 16 ==
MTV Splitsvilla
- Season 16

Release
- Original network: MTV India
- Original release: 9 January – 16 May 2026

Series chronology
- ← Previous; Season 15

Splitsvilla 16 – Pyaar Ya Paisa, stylized as Splitsvilla X6, is the sixteenth season of the Indian reality television series MTV Splitsvilla. Shot in Mahabalipuram, the season was hosted by Sunny Leone and Karan Kundrra along with “Mischief Makers” Uorfi Javed and Nia Sharma. It aired from on 9 January 2026 to 16 May 2026 on MTV India and was digitally available on JioHotstar with Kushal "Gullu" Tanwar and Kaira Anu emerging as the winners.

Contestant	Notes	Status
Kaira	1st position from audience votes	Winners
Kushal Tanwar (Gullu)	1st position from audience votes	Winners
Ruru Thakur	Season 15 contestant; Yogesh's ex and Wild Card Entry	Runners-up
Ruru Thakur	2nd position from audience votes	Runners-up
Yogesh Rawat	2nd position from audience votes	Runners-up
Niharika Tiwari	3rd position from audience votes	2nd runner-Up
Sorab Bedi	3rd position from audience votes	2nd runner-Up
Soundharya Shetty	(Power couple); 4th position from audience votes	3rd runner-up
Tayne De Villiers	(Power couple); 4th position from audience votes	3rd runner-up
Suzzane	Lost in semi-finale against Niharika and Sorab	Eliminated
Vishu Bajaj	Lost in semi-finale against Niharika and Sorab	Eliminated
Deeptanshu Saini	Lost in semi-finale against Yogesh and Ruru	Eliminated
Sadhaaf Shankar	Lost in semi-finale against Yogesh and Ruru	Eliminated
Diksha Pawar	Dumped by Himanshu via Mischief Box twist	Eliminated
Diksha Pawar	Re-entered; Eliminated prior to semi-finale (Lack of splitcoins to participate)	Eliminated
Himanshu Arora	Eliminated prior to semi-finale (Lack of splitcoins to participate)	Eliminated
Akanksha Choudhary	Dumped by Tayne and Soundharya (Power Match)	Eliminated
Asmita Adhikari	Dumped by Tayne and Soundharya (Power Match)	Eliminated
Mohit Magotra	Dumped by Tayne and Soundharya (Power Match)	Eliminated
Anushka Ghosh	Dumped by Deeptanshu	Eliminated
Anushka Ghosh	Re-entered; Dumped by Vishu and Suzzane (Ideal Match)	Eliminated
Gauresh Gujral	Dumped by Mohit and Anuska (By Mischief Box)	Eliminated
Ron Kariappa	Dumped by Kaira and Gullu and Sadhaaf (Ideal Matches)	Eliminated
Zalak Gohil	Dumped by rule (No power card)	Eliminated
Preet Singh	Dumped by Soundharya and Deeptanshu (Ideal Match)	Eliminated
Anisha Shinde	Dumped by Sorab and Niharika (Ideal Match)	Eliminated
Harshit Gururani	Dumped by Sorab and Niharika (Ideal Match)	Eliminated
Ayush Sharma	Dumped by Gullu and Suzzane (Power Match)	Eliminated
Chakshdeep Singh	Dumped by Himanshu and Soundharya (Power Match)	Eliminated
Anjali Schmuck	Dumped by Gauresh and Akanksha (Ideal Match)	Eliminated
Simran Khan	Dumped by Mischief Box twist	Eliminated
Simran Khan	Dumped by Yogesh	Eliminated
Keona Walke	Withdrew	Quit
Khushi Rawal	Dumped by Kaira	Eliminated
Ayush Jamwal	Dumped by Mischief Box twist	Eliminated
Aarav Chugh	Dumped by Vishu	Eliminated
Anuj Sharma	Dumped by Mischief Box twist	Eliminated

indicates female contestants.
indicates male contestants.
indicates pyaar villa contestants.
indicates paisa villa contestants.
indicates wildcard contestants.
