= Gundewar =

Gundewar is an Indian surname. Notable people with the surname include:

- Sai Gundewar (born Saiprasad Gundewar; 1978–2020), Indian actor, model, voiceover artist, and entrepreneur
- Vilasrao Gundewar, Indian politician
