= Naina Singh =

Indian model and actress (born 1994)

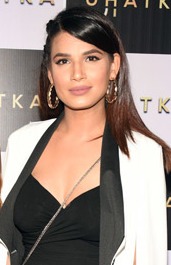
- Singh in 2019
- Born: 4 March 1994 (age 32); Moradabad, Uttar Pradesh, India
- Occupations: Model; actress
- Years active: 2017–present
- Known for: Splitsvilla 10; Kumkum Bhagya

Naina Singh (born 4 March 1994) is an Indian model and television actress known for winning Splitsvilla 10 and playing Rhea Mehra in Kumkum Bhagya. In 2020, she participated in the reality show Bigg Boss 14.

== Early life ==
Singh is a state level table tennis champion. Since her school days, she has played all kinds of sports including cricket, football, basketball and volleyball. She was an assistant casting director before participating in Splitsvilla 10.

== Career ==
In 2013, Singh was crowned Femina's Most Stylish Diva. In 2017, she participated in MTV India's dating reality show Splitsvilla 10 where she finished as the winner with Baseer Ali. Next, she starred in her first music video titled Sundowner, sung by Avi J and Jyotica Tangri.

In 2018, she participated in Star Plus's talent reality show India's Next Superstars and emerged as a finalist.

In 2019, she portrayed Rhea Mehra in Zee TV's drama series Kumkum Bhagya. In February 2020, Singh quit the show stating she could not relate to the character at all, the kind of emotions she was portraying were not justified and she could not play the part of such a negative character anymore.

In October 2020, she participated as a wild card in Colors TV's reality competition show Bigg Boss 14. In 2021, she starred in the music video Wajah, sung by Ashwani Sharma. Next, she starred in the music video Melody, sung by Prince Narula.

== Filmography ==
=== Films ===
Year	Title	Role	Ref.
2023	Mussoriie Boyz	Mandira	

=== Television ===
Year	Title	Role	Notes	Ref.
2017	MTV Splitsvilla 10	Contestant	Winner	
2018	India's Next Superstars	Contestant	Runner-up	
2019–2020	Kumkum Bhagya	Rhea Mehra		
2020	Bigg Boss 14	Contestant	19th place	

=== Music videos ===
Year	Title	Singer(s)	Ref.
2017	Sundowner	Avi J, Jyotica Tangri	
2021	Wajah	Ashwani Sharma	
2021	Melody	Prince Narula, Jaymeet	
2023	KHAYALUN MA	Meedhya	
2025	Dil Tod Diya Na	Javed Ali	
