= India's Next Superstars =

- Genre: Reality
- Presented by: Rithvik Dhanjani; Karan Wahi
- Starring: Karan Wahi; Naina Singh
- Judges: INS: Rohit Shetty; Karan Johar; Pathshala: Mukesh Chhabra; Mahesh Bhatt
- Country of origin: India
- No. of seasons: 1
- No. of episodes: INS: 25 INS Pathshala: 60

Production
- Running time: 90 minute
- Production company: Endemol Shine India

Original release
- Network: STAR Plus
- Release: 13 January – 8 April 2018

India's Next Superstars is an Indian talent search reality television show which aired on Star Plus and streamed on Hotstar. It was judged by Karan Johar and Rohit Shetty. Aman Gandotra and Natasha Bharadwaj were declared as winners, while Shruti Sharma was the first runner up and awarded the special title of ‘Third Superstar’. Naina Singh, Ashish Mehrotra, and Harshvardhan Deo were the other runner ups. But till now none of the winners got any project which they were promised.

== Concept ==
Ten males and ten females live together and are judged on the basis of their performances in acting and dancing assignments, with contestants eliminated every other episode. Two males and two females join in the middle of the competition as wild-card contestants. The two winners receive a three-film deal with Dharma Productions.

== Contestants ==
Male
| Name | Place | Notes |
|---|---|---|
| Aman Gandotra | Winner | _ |
| Aashish Mehrotra | Runner-Up | _ |
| Harshvardhan Deo | Runner-Up | _ |
| Ansh Bagri | Semifinalist | Eliminated 1 April |
| Shariq Nanda | 5th | Eliminated 18 March |
| Tapan Singh | 6th | Wild Card; Eliminated 11 March |
| Karan Taluja | 7th | Eliminated 4 March |
| Ahmed Masi Wali | 8th | Eliminated 25 February |
| Harshvardhan Ahlawat | 9th | Eliminated 18 February |
| Jash Bahl | 10th | Eliminated 4 February |
| Shivank Choudhary | 11th | Eliminated 28 January |
| Karanraj Sharma | 12th | Eliminated 21 January |

Female
| Name | Place | Notes |
|---|---|---|
| Natasha Bharadwaj | Winner | _ |
| Shruti Sharma | Second Winner | _ |
| Naina Singh | Runner-Up | _ |
| Lekha Prajapati | Semifinalist | Eliminated 1 April |
| Elisha Mayor | 5th | Wild Card; Eliminated 18 March |
| Simran Choudhary | 6th | Wild Card; Eliminated 1 March |
| Angela Krislinzki | 7th | Eliminated 4 March |
| Kanikka Kapur | 8th | Eliminated 25 February |
| Pranati Rai Prakash | 9th | Eliminated 18 February |
| Heli Vyas | 10th | Eliminated 4 February |
| Sahiba Bhasin | 11th | Eliminated 28 January |
| Laveena Keswani | 12th | Eliminated 21 January |

== Guests ==
- Episodes 1–2 – Priyanka Chopra
- Episodes 3–4 – Sidharth Malhotra
- Episodes 5–6 – Kangana Ranaut
- Episodes 9–10 – Kartik Aaryan, Nushrat Bharucha and Sunny Singh
- Episodes 13–14 – Sonakshi Sinha and Dhvani Bhanushali
- Episode 18 – Urvashi Rautela
- Episode 19 – Shreyas Talpade
- Episode 22 – Tiger Shroff
- Finale – Badshah

== Scoring Chart ==
| Status | Contestant | Episodes | | | | | | | | | | | | Total score (175) |
| Status | Contestant | 3–4 | 5–6 | 7–8 | 9–10 | 11–12 | 13–14 | 15–16 | 17–18 | 19–20 | 21–22 | 23–24 | 25–26 (Finals) | Total score (175) |
|---|---|---|---|---|---|---|---|---|---|---|---|---|---|---|
| Winners | Aman | 8 | 12 | 14 | 14 | 7+3=10 | 9+3=12 | 10+3=13 | 10+4=14 | 10+5=15 | 10+5=15 | 10+4=14 | Winner | 141 |
| Winners | Natasha | 9 | 18 | 14 | 15 | 10+5=15 | 10+5=15 | 10+5=15 | 10+5=15 | 8+5=15 | 10+5=15 | 10+5=15 | Winner | 166 |
| Winners | Shruti | 9 | 18 | 19 | 18 | 10+5=15 | 10+4=14 | 10+4=14 | 10+4=14 | 10+5=15 | 10+5=15 | 10+5=15 | Second Winner | 166 |
| Finalists | Aashish | 8 | 16 | 18 | 20 | 8+4=12 | 10+4=14 | 8+4=12 | 10+4=14 | 10+5=15 | 8+5=13 | 10+4=14 | Runner up | 156 |
| Finalists | Naina | 7 | 15 | 15 | 18 | 10+4=14 | 7+3=10 | 8+4=12 | 10+4=14 | 8+5=13 | 10+5=15 | 10+4=14 | Runner up | 147 |
| Finalists | Harshvardhan D. | N/A | | | | | | Debut | 8+4=12 | 10+4=14 | 10+4=14 | 10+4=14 | Runner up | 54 |
| Semi-Finalists | Lekha | 7 | 16 | 16 | 16 | 8+4=12 | 8+4=12 | 8+4=12 | 9+4=13 | 10+4=14 | 10+5=15 | 10+4=14 | Eliminated | 147 |
| Semi-Finalists | Ansh | 10 | 19 | 18 | 17 | 10+4=14 | 7+4=11 | 8+4=12 | 8+4=12 | 10+5=15 | 10+5=15 | 8+4=12 | Eliminated | 155 |
| 5 | Shariq | 9 | 16 | 14 | 14 | 10+3=13 | 8+4=12 | 8+3=11 | 10+4=14 | 8+5=13 | Eliminated | | | 116 |
| 5 | Elisha | N/A | | | | | | Debut | 8+4=12 | 8+5=13 | Eliminated | | | 25 |
| 6 | Tapan | N/A | | | | | | Debut | 6+3=9 | Eliminated | | | | 9 |
| 6 | Simran | N/A | | | | | | Debut | 8+4=12 | Eliminated | | | | 12 |
| 7 | Karan | 7 | 17 | 16 | 16 | 6+3=9 | 8+4=12 | 6+3=9 | Eliminated | | | | | 86 |
| 7 | Angela | 9 | 18 | 20 | 16 | 8+5=13 | 6+3=9 | 6+3=9 | Eliminated | | | | | 97 |
| 8 | Ahmed | 8 | 14 | 16 | 18 | 6+3=9 | 6+4=10 | Eliminated | | | | | | 75 |
| 8 | Kanikka | 10 | 19 | 16 | 19 | 6+3=9 | 6+3=9 | Eliminated | | | | | | 97 |
| 9 | Harshvardhan A. | 7 | 14 | 12 | 13 | 6+3=9 | Eliminated | | | | | | | 55 |
| 9 | Pranati | 7 | 13 | 17 | 14 | 6+3=9 | Eliminated | | | | | | | 60 |
| 10 | Jash | 10 | 14 | 12 | Eliminated | | | | | | | | | 36 |
| 10 | Heli | 6 | 12 | 12 | Eliminated | | | | | | | | | 30 |
| 11 | Shivank | 6 | 12 | Eliminated | | | | | | | | | | 18 |
| 11 | Sahiba | 7 | 12 | Eliminated | | | | | | | | | | 19 |
| 12 | Karanraj | 6 | Eliminated | | | | | | | | | | | 6 |
| 12 | Laveena | 6 | Eliminated | | | | | | | | | | | 6 |

Male
Female
Immune
Eliminated
Danger Zone
Non Elimination Bottom
Runner Up
Winner

- In episode 3–4, the contestants were judged on 10 points.
- In episode 11 onwards, the contestants were judged on 10 points on their acting and 5 points on their dance performance.
- In episode 15–16 there were 4 wild-card entries introduced: Harshvardhan Deo, Tapan Singh, Elisha Mayor, and Simran Choudhary. They made an acting performance but no dance performance, and were not scored by the judges.
- In episode 21–22, there was no elimination. Ashish Mehrotra and Naina Singh were to be eliminated but the judges declared it a non-elimination week.
