= Nikhil Chinapa =

Indian DJ

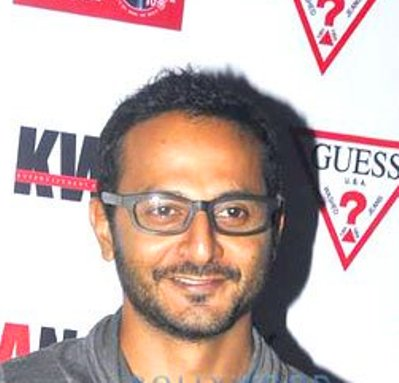
- Born: Kalengada Bhemaiah Chinapa; 6 June 1973 (age 53); Bangalore, Mysore State, India
- Education: B.M.S. Institute of Technology and Management, B.M.S. College of Engineering, Bangalore
- Occupations: VJ; DJ; Host
- Years active: 1999–present
- Spouse: DJ Pearl (m. 2006)
- Children: 1

Nikhil Chinapa (born 6 June 1973) is an Indian DJ, host and festival curator, often credited with popularizing EDM among the youth in India. He has been associated with MTV India since the late 1990s and has appeared in multiple television shows including Roadies and Splitsvilla. He has been instrumental in popularizing DJing as a profession and leading the music scene at the Sunburn Festival in its early years.

== Early life ==
Chinapa was born in Bangalore. His father was a paratrooper in the Indian Army, and as a result he did his early education from different schools in India, including Begumpet's Hyderabad Public School, Hyderabad and Faust High School, Secundarabad, after which he studied in St. George High School Agra. He earned a degree in architecture from BMS College of Engineering in Bangalore with a thesis on the design of hospitals. His interest in music grew during his college life when he used to do gigs as a DJ in parties to earn his pocket money.

== Personal life ==
Chinapa married his long-time girlfriend DJ Pearl Miglani in 2006 after a six-year-long relationship. In February 2018, they welcomed their daughter.

Chinapa is also a keen scuba diver, and loves exploring oceans around the world.

== Career ==
Chinapa's career as a television personality started when he won the MTV VJ Hunt in 1999. Thereon he hosted MTV Select, a show which introduced popular music and bands from the various parts of the world. In 2000 he debuted as an actor with the film Snip!. Later, he hosted shows like India's Got Talent 2 with Ayushmann Khurana and several seasons of MTV Splitsvilla. He also judged shows like Rock On, MTV Mashups, Fame X and seasons 4, 5 and 7 of MTV Roadies. Since the thirteenth season of Roadies, Chinapa has been playing the role of a gang leader in the show.

Chinapa co-founded Submerge in 2003 along with his wife Pearl and Hermit Sethi; it went on to be one of the largest EDM companies in India. In 2007, he co-founded Sunburn, but parted ways with the franchise in 2013 due to internal issues and co-founded Vh1 Supersonic with his wife Pearl. It continues to be one of India's biggest dance music festivals.

== Filmography ==
=== Films ===
Year	Film	Role
2000	Snip!	
2003	Pyaar Kiya Nahin Jaatha	Ravi S. Pillai
2006	Kudiyon Ka Hai Zamana	
2009	42 kms	
2011	Shaitan	Sandeep Srivastava

=== Television ===
Year	Show	Role
1999	MTV VJ Hunt	Contestant
1999-2000	Hello Friends	Vikram and Akram
2000	MTV Select	Host
2009	MTV Rock On	Host
2009–2014	MTV Splitsvilla	Host
2010	India's Got Talent	Host
2017–2021	MTV Roadies	Gang Leader/Leader
2021	MTV Splitsvilla	Guest Presenter
2026	Alliance	Contestant Eliminated Week 4

== Discography ==
- Stop! ("Nachle - Remix") (2004)
- Salaam Namaste (Salaam Namaste (Dhol Mix)) (2005) along with DJ Naved Khan
- Dus (Z version, "Deedar De") (2005)
- Zinda (Writer: "Maula", "Maula - Remix", "Zinda Hoon Main", "Zinda Hoon Main - Remix") (2006)
- Shootout at Lokhandwala ("Unke Nashe Mein - Remix", "Aakhri Alvida - Remix") (2007)
- Om Shanti Om (Writer: "Dastaan-E-Om Shanti Om" (The Dark Side)) (2007)

== Accolades ==
Year	Award	Category	Work	Result	Ref.
2003	Indian Television Academy Awards	Best Anchor - Music/Film Based Show	MTV Fresh	Won	

== See also ==
- Sunburn Festival
- List of MTV VJs
