= Submerge (nightclub) =

Indian nightclub

For the 1998 Japanese album Submerge, see Coaltar of the Deepers

Submerge is an Indian dance and clubbing scene founded in 2002 by MTV India VJ Nikhil Chinapa, with DJ Pearl, Chinappa's wife, as a co-founder.

Submerge has operated in the music and clubbing scene in India as an alternative to the mainstream, featuring genres such as techno, trance, house, progressive, psychedelic, tribal, electro, tech house, unreleased, and indie music. It has hosted various DJs and planned to expand its approach across India with Indian and international artists.

== See also ==
- List of electronic dance music venues
