= Angela Krislinzki =

Indo-Polish actress and model

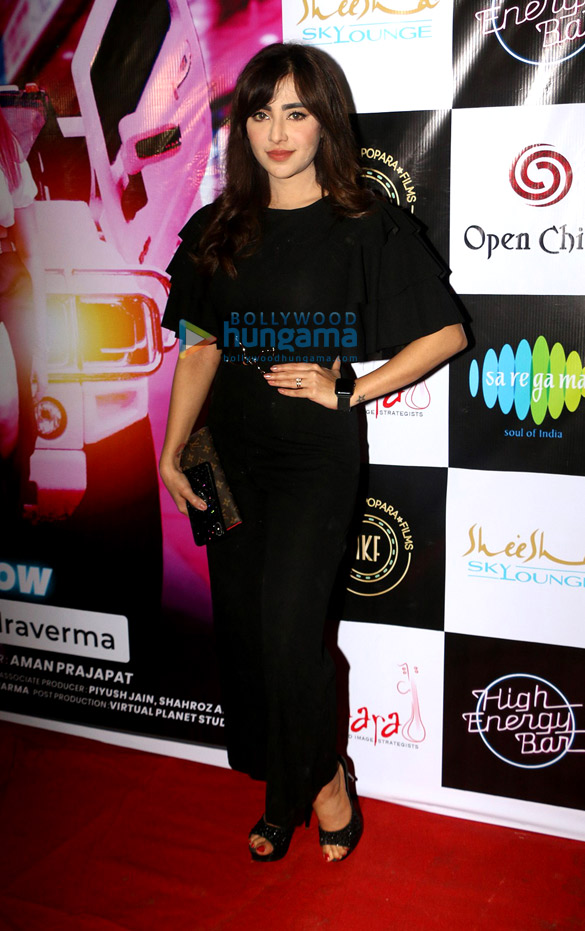
- Angela Krislinzki at the "Milo Na Tum" song launch.
- Born: India
- Education: Masters in Psychology, Kishinchand Chellaram College, Mumbai
- Occupations: Actress, Model
- Years active: 2017-present
- Mother: Neeta Krislinzki

Angela Krislinzki is an Indo-Polish actress and model who primarily acts in Telugu and Hindi films. Her Telugu debut movie was Rogue directed by Puri Jagannadh. She is also known as Annie Krislinzki. The few reality shows that she was seen in are Beauty and the Geek, Splitsvilla, Lux the chosen one and she was last seen on a reality show on star plus's India's Next Superstars, judged by Karan Johar and Rohit Shetty. Her Bollywood debut was 1921, directed by Vikram Bhatt. Apart from acting, she is trained in different dance forms, and has done various special dance numbers in South Indian movies like Jyothi Lakshmi and Size Zero.

Krislinzki married musician Madhav Mahajan on 20 October 2023 in Jalandhar. She is a fan of Sidhu Moose Wala and appeared in one of his music videos.

== Filmography ==
Year	Film	Role	Language	Notes
2015	Jyothi Lakshmi	Special appearance	Telugu	Item number in Song Raja Raja
2015	Size Zero	Special appearance	Telugu / Tamil	Item number in song Size Zero
2017	Rogue	Anjali	Telugu / Kannada	Lead actress
2017	Ramratan	Amy	Hindi	
2018	1921	Meher Wadia	Hindi	Negative Role
2020	Malang		Hindi	
2024	Tauba Tera Jalwa	Rinku	Hindi	

== Music videos ==
Year	Song	Singer	Lyricist/Composer	Label	Notes
2018	Punjabi Girl	Raftaar, Apache Indian	Raftaar	Apache Indian	
2018	Naina	Ankit Tiwari	Monish Raza & Sahas	Ankit Tiwari	
2019	Nakhro	Teji Grewal	Vicky Dhaliwal	Crown Records	
2019	Beer Can	Aarish Singh	Rishi Malhi	Zee Music Company	
2019	I M Better Now	Sidhu Moose Wala	Sidhu Moose Wala	T-Series	
2019	Chann Vi Gawah	Madhav Mahajan	Hina Mahajan Handa	One Music	
2019	Laut Aaja	Madhav Mahajan	Samay	One Music	
2019	Angreji Gaalan	Armaan Bedil	Joban Cheema	Speed Records	
2019	Ishq Ka Raja	Addy Nagar	AddyNagar & Hamsar Hayat	Lokdhun	
2020	Bholenath (A Love Story)	Kaka	Kaka	Pellet Drum Productions	
