= Sai Gundewar =

Indian actor (1978–2020)

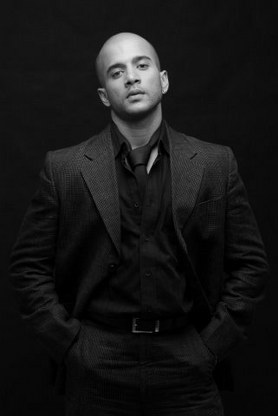
- Died: 10 May 2020 (aged 42); Los Angeles, California, United States
- Occupations: Actor, Model
- Known for: Splitsvilla 4

Saiprasad Gundewar (22 February 1978 – 10 May 2020) was an Indian actor and model. He was best known for his appearances in reality shows like Survivor and Splitsvilla, as well as acting in films such as PK (film) (2014), Bazaar (2018) and Rock On!!. He died in Los Angeles after a year-long battle with brain cancer.

== Personal life ==
Sai married fashion designer Sapna Amin in 2015. He struggled with brain cancer before succumbing to it on 10 May in Los Angeles.

== Career ==
Sai played some significant cameos in films such as Yuvvraaj, P.K, Rockon!!, Pappu Can't Dance Saala, Me aur Main and David and also appeared in many Television commercials. He played the role of ticket seller in P.K
